= Empire Theatre =

Empire Theatre or Empire Theater may refer to:

== Australia ==
- Empire Theatre, Adelaide, former theatre and cinema in Grote Street, Adelaide, 1909–1948
- Empire Theatre, Sydney, former musical theatre and cinema in New South Wales
- Empire Theatre, Toowoomba, heritage-listed theatre in Queensland
- New Empire Cinema (Bowral), formerly known as the Empire Theatre

== Canada ==
- Empire Theatres, former multiplex movie theatre chain

== United Kingdom ==
- Empire Cinemas multiplex cinema chain with 14 locations and 131 screens
- Empire Palace Theatre, later simply the Empire Theatre and now the Edinburgh Festival Theatre, Edinburgh
- Empire Theatre of Varieties, now the Empire, Leicester Square, City of Westminster, London
- Glasgow Empire Theatre, Glasgow
- Hackney Empire, in Hackney
- Liverpool Empire Theatre, Liverpool
- Empire Theatre, Longton, former theatre and cinema in Staffordshire
- New Empire Theatre, Southend-on-Sea
- Sunderland Empire Theatre, Sunderland
- Empire Cinema, Blackpool
- The Empire Theatre, Burnley

== United States ==
- Empire Theater, now known as the Mainstreet Theater, Kansas City, Missouri
- Empire Theatre (40th Street), located at 1430 Broadway, near 40th Street, a former & now demolished Broadway theatre
- Empire Theatre (42nd Street), former & now demolished Broadway theatre, was converted to the lobby of a movie theater
- Empire Theatre (Philadelphia, Broad St. and Locust St.)
- Empire Theatre (Philadelphia, Broad St. and Fairmont Ave.)
- Empire Theatre (Rochester, New York)

== See also ==
- New Empire Cinema (disambiguation)
- Moss Empires, the company that owned many Empire Theatres in the United Kingdom
