= New Empire Cinema =

New Empire Cinema may refer to:

- New Empire Cinema (Bowral), New South Wales, Australia
- New Empire Cinema (Kolkata), India
- New Empire Cinema (Mumbai), India

== See also ==
- New Empire Theatre
- Empire Cinemas, UK cinema chain
- New Empire (disambiguation)
- Empire Theatre (disambiguation)
