= New Empire =

New Empire can refer to:

- New Kingdom of Egypt, when Ancient Egypt was at the height of its power
- Xin dynasty (literally: New Empire), Chinese imperial dynasty from 9 to 23 AD
- New Empire (band), an Australian band
- New Empire Cinema (disambiguation), several cinemas
- New Empire Theatre
- A New Empire, a 2016 EP by Ailee
- Final Fantasy XV: A New Empire, a mobile game
- Godzilla x Kong: The New Empire, a 2024 monster film

== See also ==
- New (disambiguation)
- Empire (disambiguation)
- New Kingdom (disambiguation)
