= Albert Marchinsky =

Polish stage magician

Albert Marchinsky in his Rameses costume at the height of his fame in 1914. From an autograph album in the collection of The Magic Circle.

Albert Marchinsky (born Alie Marczynski or Elias Marchinski; 1875 – 31 July 1930) was a Polish stage magician.

== Biography ==
Marchinsky was born into a Jewish family in 1875 in Osięciny, Warsaw region, Russian Poland, the son of Philip or Faivish, a clothier, and Eva. The family moved to Mile End New Town in Whitechapel in the early 1880s, stopping in Germany, where his brother was born. He became a British citizen at 18 years of age.

== Career ==
Marchinsky's stage name was "The Great Rameses", his bill matter described him as "The Eastern Mystic" and his costume and sets were intended to look Egyptian. He has been described as a follower of the magician William Ellsworth Robinson, whose stage persona was Chung Ling Soo.

He is said to have got his first inspiration in magic while watching a magician perform at the Royal Aquarium theatre in London in about 1890 and to have started out at that time as a performer in the small halls of London. By 1910 Marchinsky was recognised as a leading stage illusionist.

His act was on a large scale. An article written after his death described it as follows: "When the curtain rose, the audience saw an Egyptian temple with flaming censers and turbaned assistants. Rameses presented an illusion called 'The Fire Goddess' which was the peak of his performance. It was a cremation illusion with additions that greatly enhanced the trick. A girl was apparently cremated in a standing position. Rameses took the ashes with him into a cabinet and almost instantaneously reappeared at the back of the auditorium. His place in the cabinet was taken by the 'cremated' girl completely restored." A programme listed three tricks: (1) A flower growth was made while flower pots were covered with pyramids. The fresh flowers thus grown were distributed to members of the audience. (2) 'Beauty', the cremation illusion. (3) 'The Goose' involved hypnotising a live bird with the assistance of two ladies and two gentlemen from the audience.

Verall Wass, in a reminiscence in The Magic Circular in 1954, described Marchinsky's five main tricks: (1) Production of his assistants from miniature pyramids. (2) An automaton – in reality an assistant suitably dressed and with electric lights decorating his or her clothes, suggesting that the motive power was electricity. (3) Production of a duck from a "dove" pan. (4) The cremation illusion. (5) Asrah, Queen of the Air. A girl floated upwards from a small stool, performing various evolutions in the air, including skipping, then descending to the stool where she was covered with a cloth and floated upright into the air, finally disappearing.

He was a popular performer and toured widely. He performed in Dublin in the spring of 1909 with his "Egyptian Temple Mysteries" and at the London Coliseum in 1910. There he was seen by the American theatrical agents Martin and Beck, who signed him for a tour of the Orpheum theatre circuit that year. He opened at the Orpheum Theatre in Denver, Colorado, on 31 July 1910. His performances in the US were all in the West and Midwest, Chicago, St. Louis and Indianapolis being the easternmost cities he visited. He terminated the tour in February 1911, apparently on the grounds of his father's death.

Back in England, he performed at the London Palladium, The Hippodrome, the Stockport Empire, the Salford Regent and the Shepherd's Bush Theatre. In 1912 he went to South Africa for twenty weeks and returned before the end of the year to appear again at the London Coliseum. In June 1913, he commenced another tour of the United States, then made a continental tour, returning to London in early 1914, where he had many London bookings. He appeared before the King and Queen in 1917.

In 1917 Marchinsky invested the money he had made on his tours in the Empire Theatre, Southend-on-Sea, where he presented, among other productions, Eugene Brieux's controversial play, Damaged Goods (Les Avariés). He was not successful in his theatre venture and by the end of that year was back in the music halls again.

In 1920 he made a headline tour of all the Stoll theatres in London and in 1923 he was asked to join one of Maskelyne's productions.

In the 1920s he worked at The Kursaal, Southend-on-Sea, Essex, alongside another successful magician, Maurice Fogel, who began as Marchinsky's assistant, helping him out at a time when he was said to be "worse for wear". Towards the end of his life he performed acts of small magic, nothing like the large acts of his heyday.

== Death ==
Marchinsky died following an operation in Southend's Victoria Hospital in July 1930, at the age of 54.
