= New Kingdom (disambiguation) =

New Kingdom may refer to:

- New Kingdom of Egypt, c. 1550–1069 BC
- New Kingdom of the Hittites, c. 1400–1180 BC
- New Kingdom of Babylonia or Neo-Babylonian Empire, 626–539 BC
- New Kingdom of Granada, Spanish colonial territory in South America, 1538–1821
- New Kingdom of León, Spanish colonial territory in North America, 1582–1821
- New Kingdom (band), American rap rock duo
- New Kingdom (album), 1992 album by Roy Campbell
- Johnny's New Kingdom, 2008 BBC TV series

== See also ==
- Kingdom (disambiguation)
- New Empire (disambiguation)
