= Divine Lorraine Hotel =

- Lorraine Apartments
- U.S. National Register of Historic Places
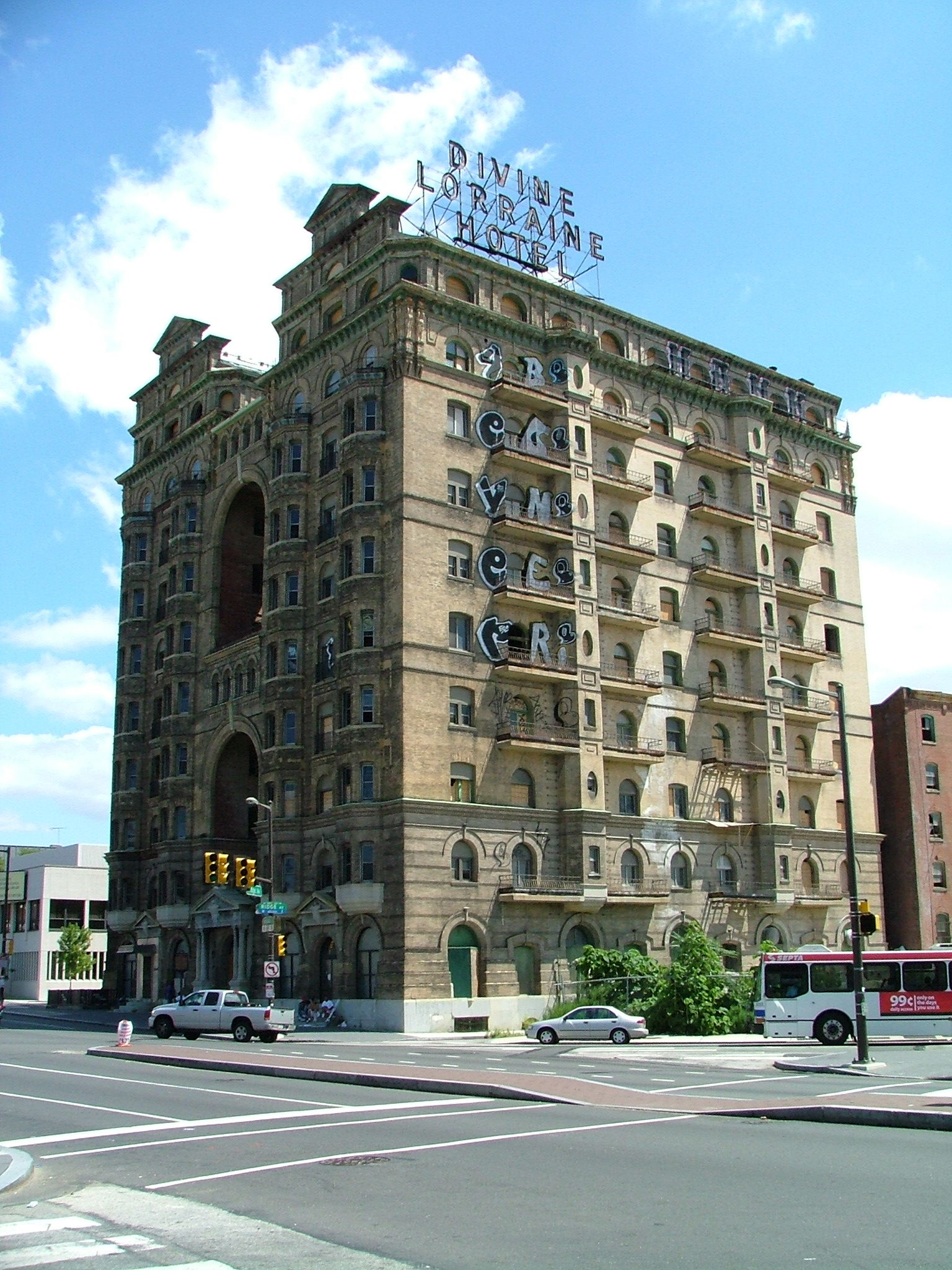
- The Divine Lorraine from Broad Street, prior to its 2008 renovations
- Location: 699 North Broad Street, Philadelphia, PA 19123
- Coordinates: 39°58′0″N 75°9′36″W
- Built: 1892
- Architect: Willis G. Hale; George F. Payne and Company
- Architectural style: Late Victorian
- NRHP reference No.: 02001427
- Added to NRHP: November 27, 2002

The Divine Lorraine Hotel, also known as the Lorraine Apartments, stands at the corner of Broad Street and Fairmount Avenue in North Philadelphia, Pennsylvania. Designed by architect Willis G. Hale and built between 1892 and 1894, the building originally functioned as apartments, housing some of Philadelphia's wealthy residents. Lorraine Apartments was one of the most luxurious and best preserved late 19th-century apartment houses in Philadelphia. In 1900 the building became the Lorraine Hotel when the Italian-owned Metropolitan Hotel Company purchased the apartments. Later it became the first hotel in Philadelphia to be racially integrated under Father Divine.

The hotel was sold in 2000 and eventually abandoned. It deteriorated, with graffiti all over the walls, broken windows, and crumbling stone until late 2015 when a new owner began a massive renovation project. It was converted back to apartments from 2017 to 2022, to a hotel from 2022 to 2024, and again apartments since 2025.

== Early history ==
Both the location of the building and the architecture itself reflect the changes that were occurring rapidly in the city of Philadelphia and in the country at the time. North Philadelphia of the 1880s attracted many of the city's nouveau-riche, those individuals who became wealthy as a result of the Industrial Revolution. The Lorraine was a place of luxurious living, providing apartments with new amenities such as electricity. In addition, the building boasted its own staff, eliminating the need for residents to have private servants. There was also a central kitchen from which meals were delivered to residents.

Reporting on the Philadelphia Phillies' return to Philadelphia in April 1935 from spring training in Florida, The Philadelphia Inquirer wrote, "the Phillies ... steamed into North Philadelphia station and jumped cabs for the Lorraine Hotel, which will be the headquarters of the club until the season opens."

The Lorraine Apartments were also an architectural feat. Prior to this period, the majority of Philadelphia's buildings were low rise, generally being no more than three or four stories tall. Not only were construction materials and techniques not capable of supporting taller buildings, but the inconvenience of the many flights of stairs to get to higher floors in the absence of an elevator was significant.

The Lorraine, at ten stories tall, was one of the first high-rise apartment buildings in the city. The building's architect, Willis G. Hale, also designed an earlier high-rise apartment building at 22nd and Chestnut Streets, which stood from 1889 until its demolition in 1945. Hale designed many other buildings around the city, but quickly fell out of favor at the turn of the century when most patrons rejected his highly stylized Victorian designs for the sleeker style of modern skyscrapers, and most of his landmarks had been torn down after the Great Depression.

== Father Divine and the International Peace Mission Movement ==
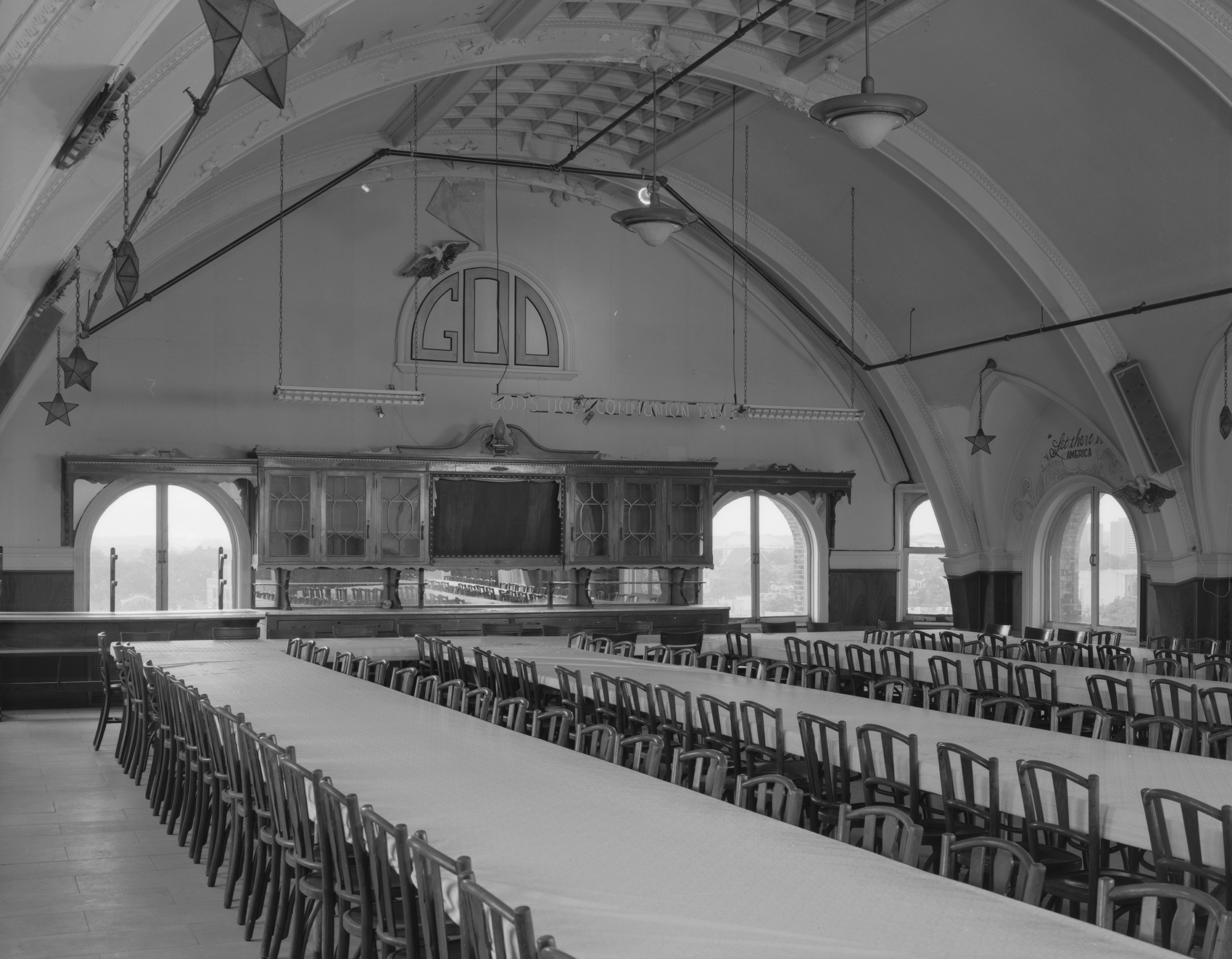
The top floor under Father Divine

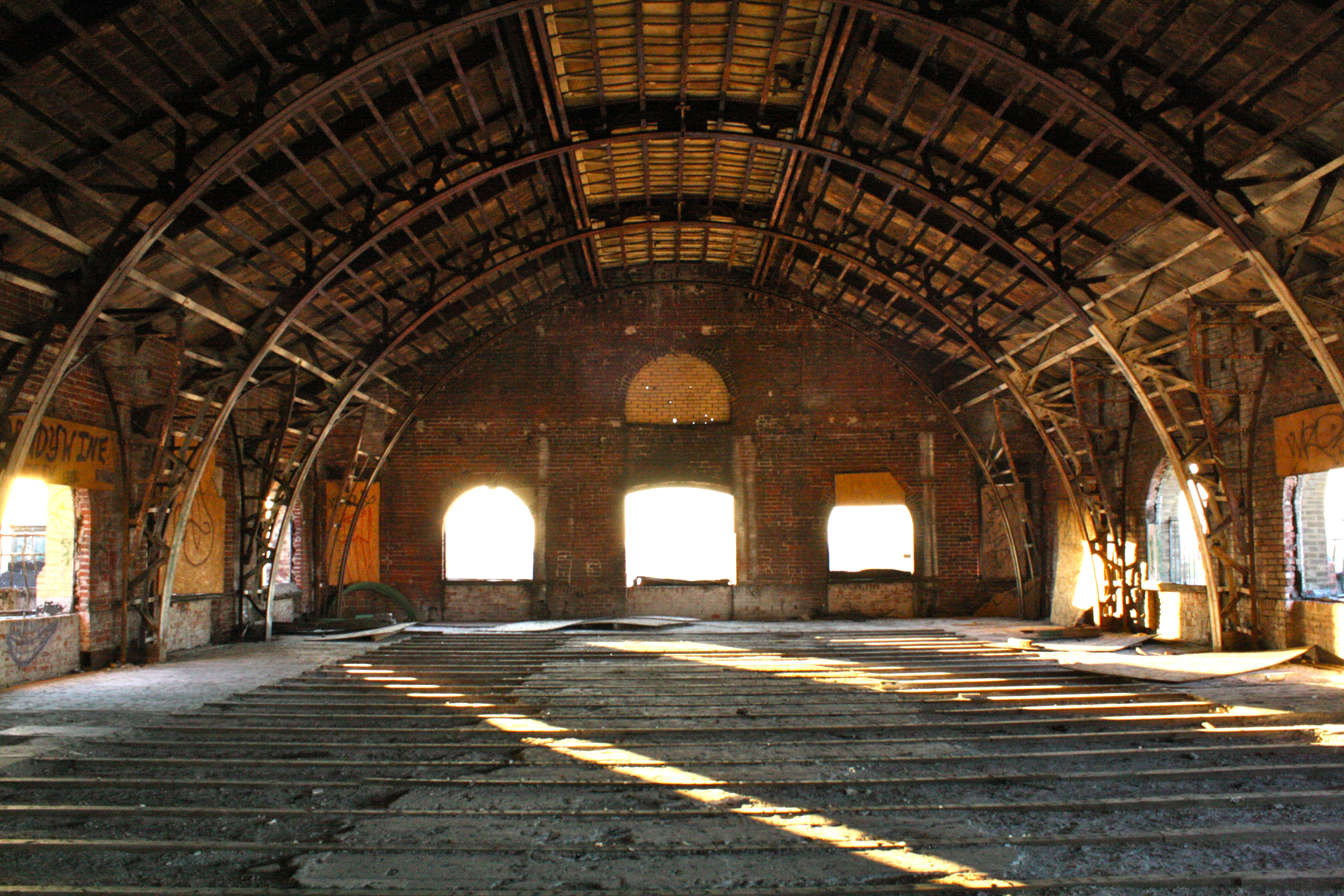
The top floor in 2010

In 1948, the building was sold to Father Divine (Reverend Major Jealous Divine) for $485,000. Father Divine was the leader of the International Peace Mission movement. After purchasing the building, Father Divine renamed it the Divine Lorraine Hotel. His hotel was the first of its class in Philadelphia, or indeed in the United States, to be fully racially integrated. The Divine Lorraine was open to all races and religions, men and women who were willing to follow the rules of the movement. Among others, the rules included no smoking, no drinking, no profanity, and no undue mixing of the sexes, with men and women residing on different floors of the building. Additionally, guests and residents were expected to uphold a certain level of modesty, meaning that women were expected to wear long skirts – pants were not allowed. Believing that all people were equal in the sight of God, Father Divine was involved in many social welfare activities as well. For example, after purchasing the hotel, several parts of it were transformed for public use. The 10th-floor auditorium was converted to a place of worship. The movement also opened the kitchen on the first floor as a public dining room where persons from the community were able to purchase and eat low-cost meals for 25 cents.

The Divine Lorraine received a historical marker from the Pennsylvania Historical and Museum Commission in 1994 and was listed on the National Register of Historic Places in 2002 as a site significant in terms of both architectural and civil rights history.

== Abandonment ==
External media
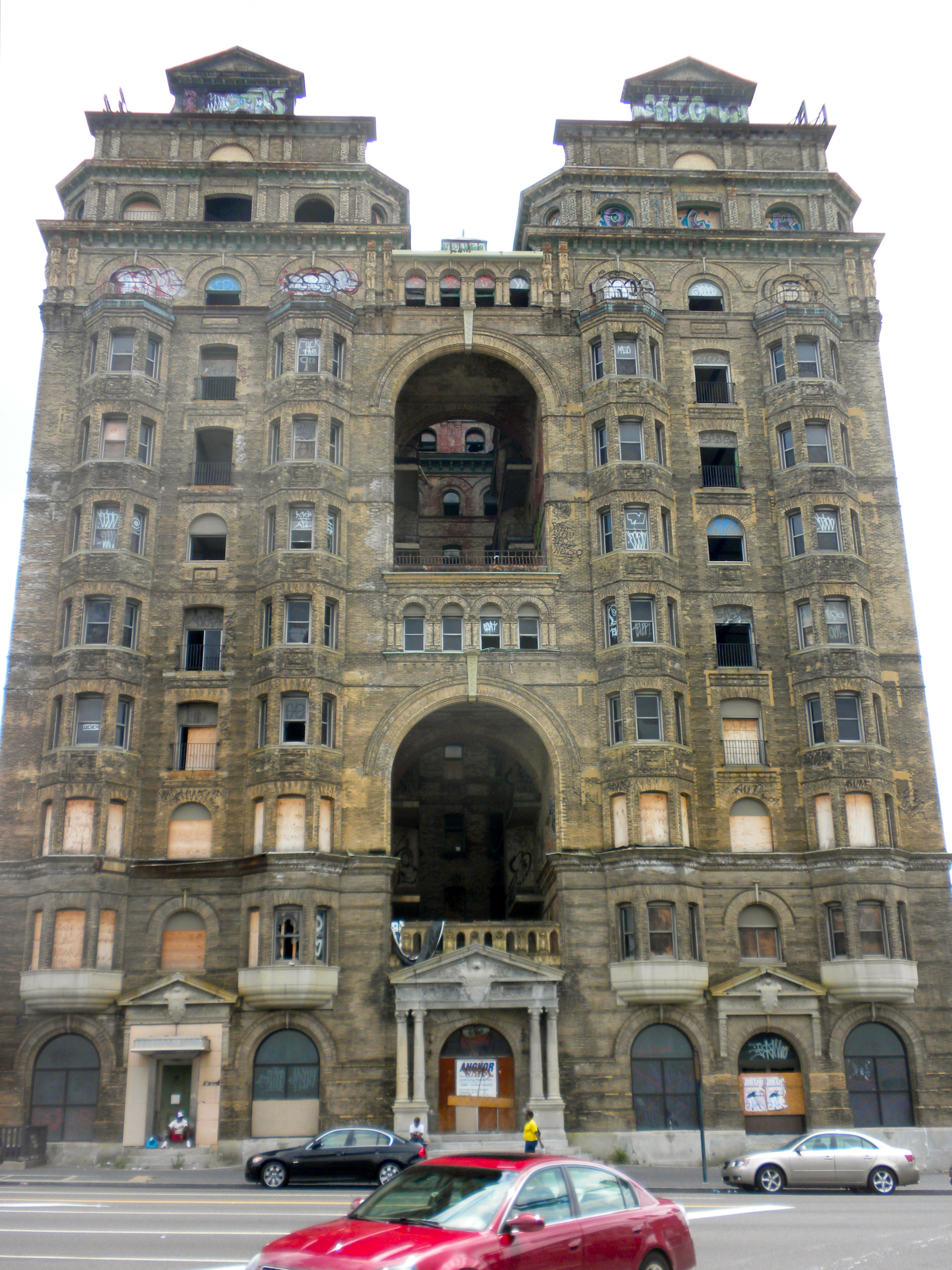

Audio
- The Divine Lorraine and development on North Broad, Radio Times With Marty Moss-Coane, 49:03, November 2012

Video
- Historic Divine Lorraine Hotel in Philadelphia, PA, Wanda Kaluza, 2:26, August 2011.
- Divine Lorraine, Antiquity Echos, 4:20, October 2011.

The building was closed in 1999 and sold in 2000 by the International Peace Mission. In May 2006 it was resold to Lorraine Hotel LP. to be converted into apartments. Development never came to fruition but furnishings were sold while floors, paneling, and other architectural items were removed by salvage companies. The building was reduced to a hollow shell, covered with graffiti, with windows boarded up or open to the weather.

The Universal Peace Mission Movement still exists in the form of a network of independent churches, businesses, and religious orders. Its followers operated another hotel, the Divine Tracy in West Philadelphia, which they sold in 2006 and is now the Axis Apartments.

== Redevelopment ==
In October 2012 the property was transferred to developer Eric Blumenfeld at the city's monthly Sheriff's sale, with Blumenfeld being the sole bidder. In February 2015 the developer announced renovation plans to convert the building into rental units with restaurants on the ground level pending closing on financing. In May 2015 construction lighting was installed in the empty hotel after an investment fund agreed to lend $31.5M USD in construction funding. In August the Philadelphia Historical Commission approved the plans to restore the building to its 1933 appearance. In June 2016 a new rooftop "Divine Lorraine" sign had been installed and some interior apartments were nearing completion.

The building struggled with high vacancy and by 2020 the developer was in default on construction loans. In 2022 apartment leases were not being renewed and the building was converted into an extended-stay hotel known as the Mint House at The Divine Lorraine. In January 2025 the hotel portion, Mint House, was closed although all of the commercial venues and event spaces remained open. Ownership of the building passed to the lenders who announced plans to return it again to a residential apartment building.
