= Empire Theatre (Philadelphia, Broad St. and Locust St.) =

Theatre in Philadelphia, Pennsylvania

Coordinates: 39.9480°N 75.1642°W

The Empire Theatre was a theatre located in Philadelphia, Pennsylvania, at the corner of Broad Street and Locust Street. It had a capacity of 1,590 people. The theatre was designed by architect Willis G. Hale, and was built by contractor John M. Sharp. It utilized Queen Anne style architecture with a pagoda style roof and its Broad Street facade included two large Norman turrets with Spanish tile cones capped by spires. The theatre opened in 1891 and remained in operation until it was demolished to make room for the Hotel Walton. The theatre was demolished in 1895 at which time its entrance was purchased by Joseph Fralinger who incorporated that architecture into renovations made to the Academy of Music in Atlantic City.

== Sources ==
- Glazer, Irvin R. (1994). "Empire Theatre". Philadelphia Theaters: A Pictorial Architectural History. Athenaeum of Philadelphia.
- Glazer, Irvin R. (1986). "Empire Theatre". Philadelphia Theatres, A-Z: A Comprehensive, Descriptive, Record of 813 Theatres Constructed Since 1724. Bloomsbury Academic. ISBN 9780313240546.
