= The Powelton =

Apartment building in Powelton Village, Philadelphia

- U.S. National Register of Historic Places
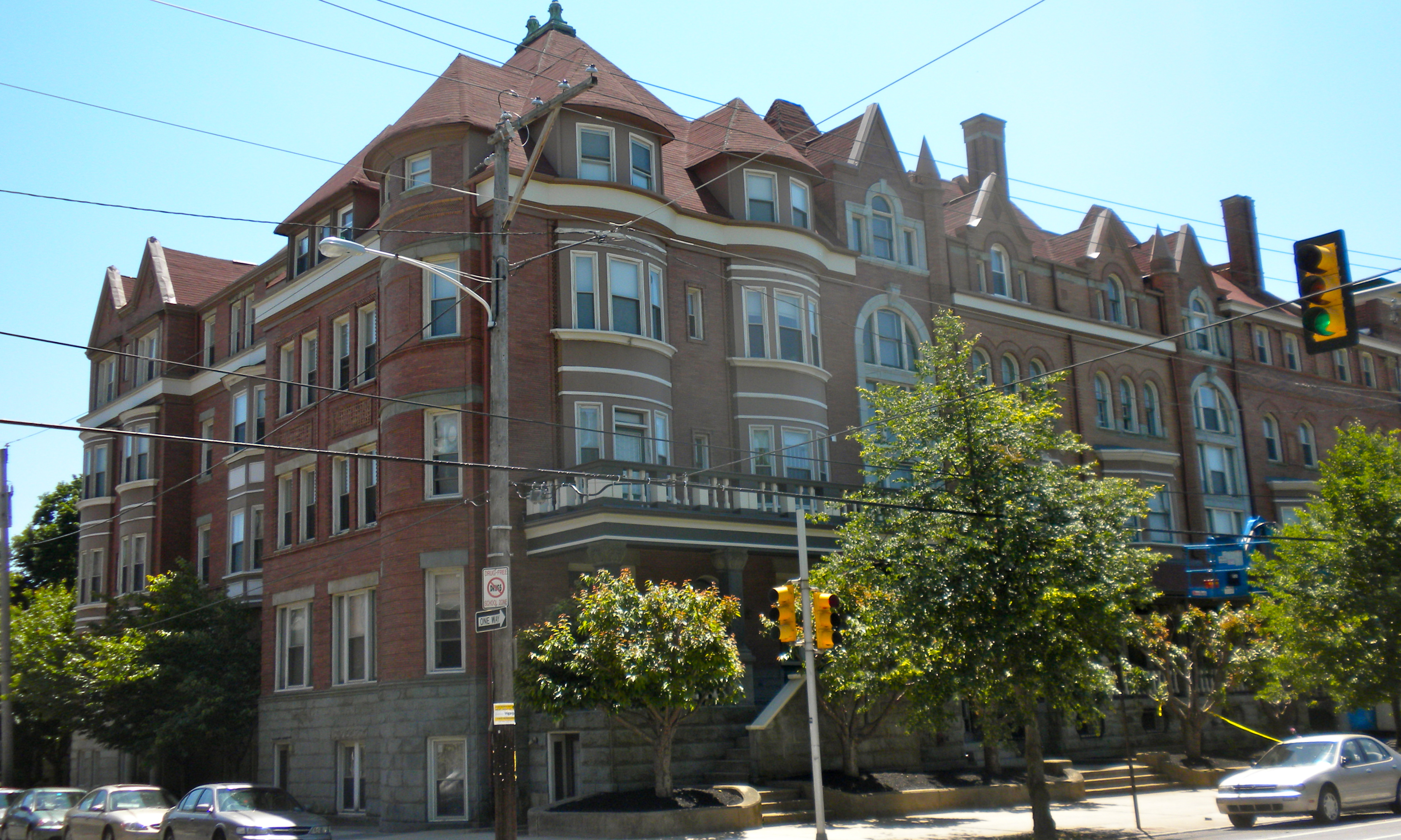
- The Powelton, May 2010

- Location within Philadelphia Location within Pennsylvania Location within the United States
- Location: 3500-3520 Powelton Ave., 214-218 35th St., and 215-221 36th St., Philadelphia, Pennsylvania
- Coordinates: 39°57′35″N 75°11′25″W
- Area: less than one acre
- Built: 1902, 1910
- Architect: Hale, Willis G.; Milligan & Webber
- NRHP reference No.: 78002452
- Added to NRHP: December 13, 1978

The Powelton, also known as the Powelton Apartments, is a historic apartment complex located in the Powelton Village neighborhood of Philadelphia, Pennsylvania. It was built in two phases; in 1902 and 1910. The first section was designed by architect Willis G. Hale (1848-1907) as a set of ten houses massed as six units. It was converted to apartments by Milligan & Webber between 1908 and 1910.

It was added to the National Register of Historic Places on December 13, 1978.
