= Willis G. Hale =

American architect

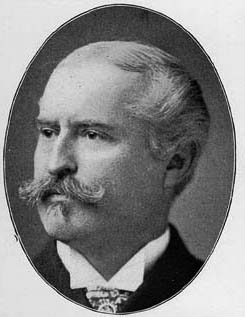
Hale in 1901

Willis Gaylord Hale (January 1848, Seneca Falls, New York – August 29, 1907, Philadelphia, Pennsylvania) was a late-19th century architect who worked primarily in Philadelphia, Pennsylvania. His flamboyant, highly-ornate style was popular in the 1880s and 1890s, but quickly fell out of fashion at the dawn of the 20th century.

== Life and career ==
According to the Biographical Album of Prominent Pennsylvanians (1890), Willis Hale became an architect through training in a series of offices: "His preliminary education was obtained at the academy at Seneca Falls, Cayuga Lake Academy at Aurora, and at the Auburn High School, where he finished his schooling. While still a pupil he ran away to join the army, but was too young to be enrolled, and was compelled to forgo his patriotic resolve. After quitting school he was given the choice of a three years' course at Ann Arbor University to study engineering, or an opportunity to study architecture. His tastes inclining more to the latter profession he decided to adopt it, and began study in Buffalo, going later to Rochester, and finally to Philadelphia, where he entered the office of Samuel Sloan, and later had Mr. John McArthur Jr. as his preceptor. In 1873 he established himself in business at Wilkes Barre, Pa.; but the troubles in the coal regions caused such a depression in all kinds of business that he returned, on November 2, 1876, to Philadelphia, where he opened an office and met with almost immediate success."

Hale married a niece of chemical manufacturer William Weightman, the largest landowner in the city. Hale designed dozens of blocks of middle-class housing for Weightman, especially in North and West Philadelphia. His lively facades often contrasted sculpture, tile, inventive brick- and stone-work, in an exuberant high-Victorian style: "Hale's genius was to take ... essentially identical rowhouses, with their mass-produced industrial parts and lathe-turned woodwork, and to make them distinctive." He designed a country house for Weightman in West Germantown: "Ravenhill" (now part of Thomas Jefferson University).

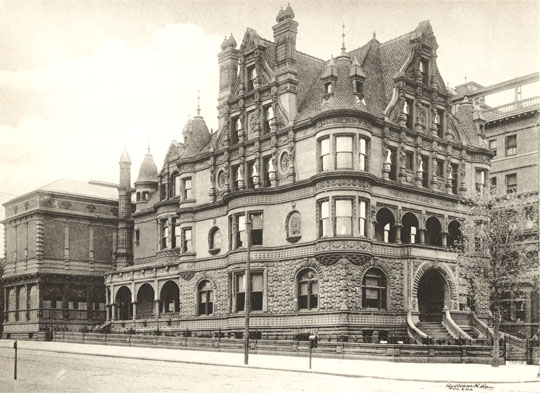
Peter A. B. Widener Mansion, Broad St. & Girard Ave., Philadelphia, PA (1887, demolished). Widener's art gallery at far left, also by Hale, was added in 1892.

He also designed urban developments for street-car magnates Peter A. B. Widener and William L. Elkins, and a massive city house for Widener at the corner of Broad Street and Girard Avenue.

Widener's city house was one of the most notable in Philadelphia. An ornate Flemish-style eclectic design in highly-wrought brownstone and brick, it had a 53-foot (16.2 m) facade on Broad Street and a 144-foot (43.9 m) facade on Girard Avenue. The over-the-top interiors were decorated by George Herzog, and included buxom nudes as newel posts, walls embellished with alabaster and bronze, and murals of the Widener children in Renaissance dress. Almost an anachronism when completed in 1887, the family lived there only a dozen years before building a sedate neo-Georgian palace in the suburbs: Lynnewood Hall. The city house served as a branch of the Free Library of Philadelphia, 1900–1946; the offices of an architectural firm, and in 1970 became the Conwell School of Theology's Institute for Black Ministries. It suffered a catastrophic fire in 1980, and was demolished.

In 1892, Hale designed the Lorraine Apartment House at Broad and Fairmount Streets in Philadelphia, completed in 1894. Purchased by radio evangelist Father Divine in 1948, the building is now known as the Divine Lorraine Hotel.

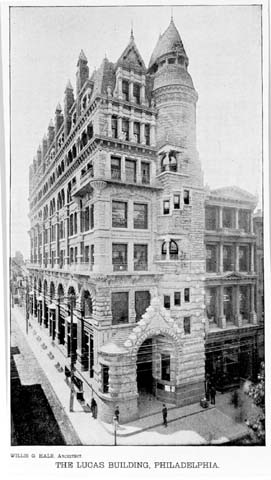
Hale (Lucas) Building in 1889. "Perhaps the most bizarre-looking skyscraper of the nineteenth century."

Hale designed numerous ornate office buildings in Center City Philadelphia, but few survive unaltered. He built his own office building at the southwest corner of Chestnut and Juniper Streets (1887, expanded 1892, altered), an unsuccessful investment that almost bankrupted him. The critic for the magazine Architectural Record declared it an "architectural aberration":

Consider the Hale Building, how it grows. The problem was to erect a seven-story office building with a narrow front on the principal street, and with rooms devoted to similar purposes and of similar dimensions throughout. The danger was that this uniformity would produce monotony. There is nothing of which your Philadelphia architect is so afraid as of monotony. In fact it is the only architectural defect of which he seems to go in fear. Variety he must have at all cost, and by securing variety he makes sure that he has avoided monotony, whereas in truth his heterogeneousness is more tiresome than any repetition could be. ...[E]very precaution has been taken, and with success, to insure that the building shall lack unity, shall lack harmony, shall lack repose and shall be a restless jumble.

Hale's architectural office was destroyed in a March 23, 1896 fire. He was a near-pauper in his later years, supported by the ever-loyal Weightman. He is buried just outside Philadelphia, in Fernwood Cemetery in Lansdowne, Pennsylvania.

A portfolio of photographs of Hale's work is at the American Philosophical Society.

=== Frank Furness ===
Hale is sometimes compared to his Philadelphia contemporary Frank Furness, whom he admired. But Hale's buildings tended to be derivative and decorative rather than innovative, half-a-decade behind the times rather than ahead of them, more concerned with surface ornament than ideas:

Hale's later fate was exemplary for the followers of Furness. For them, style was an affair of spectacular massing, audacious surfaces, and whimsical detail. ... Their walls were always more clever than their plans; when they were forced to change brick and brownstone arches for marble cornices, as the tastes of the nineties demanded, the new work showed seams. Overdone and uncertain at the same time, Hale's last works were executed for one or two loyal clients from the eighties.

Noted Lancaster, Pennsylvania architect C. Emlen Urban (1863–1939) worked under Hale in the early 1880s.

== Selected works ==
=== Residences ===
- Morris Fleisher house, 2223 Green Street, Philadelphia, Pennsylvania (circa 1880).
- "Havod" (A. Loudon Snowden house), 429 West Montgomery Avenue, Haverford, Pennsylvania (1881).
- 2100-block North Uber Street rowhouses, Philadelphia, Pennsylvania (1885–86).
- 1500-block North 17th Street (west side), Philadelphia, Pennsylvania (1886). Development of 29 rowhouses for Peter A. B. Widener and William L. Elkins.
- Peter A. B. Widener mansion, northwest corner Broad Street & Girard Avenue, Philadelphia, Pennsylvania (1887, burned 1980, demolished).
- "Ravenhill" (William Weightman house), 3480-90 School House Lane, Philadelphia, Pennsylvania (1887). Now part of Thomas Jefferson University.
- 4500-block Chester Avenue twins (south side), Philadelphia, Pennsylvania (1889).
- 4500-block Regent Street twins (north side) and rowhouses (south side), Philadelphia, Pennsylvania (1890).
- J. & Benjamin Ketcham house, 1708 Green Street, Philadelphia, Pennsylvania (1891–92). Benjamin Ketcham's Sons was the contractor for the Hale Building (1887)

=== Commercial and institutional buildings ===
- Philadelphia Home for Incurables, 48th Street and Woodland Avenue, Philadelphia, Pennsylvania (1880, demolished).
- St. Stephen Roman Catholic Church, 3805 North Broad Street, Philadelphia, Pennsylvania (1884).
- Philadelphia Record Building, 917-19 Chestnut Street, Philadelphia, Pennsylvania (1886, demolished).
- Hale Building (a.k.a. Lucas Building or Keystone National Bank), 1326-28 Chestnut Street, Philadelphia, Pennsylvania (1887, expanded 1892, altered). Now Penfield Building.
- Three Banks (Quaker City National Bank; Commonwealth Title & Trust Company; Union Trust Co.), 713-21 Chestnut Street, Philadelphia, Pennsylvania (1888–89, altered). Only the facade of Quaker City National Bank (721 Chestnut Street) survives.
- Weightman Building, 1524-26 Chestnut Street, Philadelphia, Pennsylvania (1889, burned 1896). Hale's architectural office was destroyed in the fire.
- Myers Building, 521-25 Main Street, Bethlehem, Pennsylvania (1890).
- Athletic Club of the Schuylkill Navy, 1624-28 Arch Street, Philadelphia, Pennsylvania (1891, demolished).
- Heywood Chair Factory, 1010-14 Race Street, Philadelphia, Pennsylvania (1892).
- Divine Lorraine Hotel, Broad and Fairmount Streets, Philadelphia, Pennsylvania (1894–96, interior gutted 2000s).
- Empire Theatre (Philadelphia), Broad and Locust Streets, Philadelphia
- Garrick Theatre, 1330 Chestnut Street, Philadelphia, Pennsylvania (1900–01, demolished). Built for Weightman, this 1,561-seat theater stood beside the Hale Building.
- Powelton Apartments, 3500-20 Powelton Avenue, Philadelphia, Pennsylvania (begun 1902). The initial design is attributed to Hale, but the project was left unfinished; completed by Milligan & Weber in 1908.

== Gallery ==
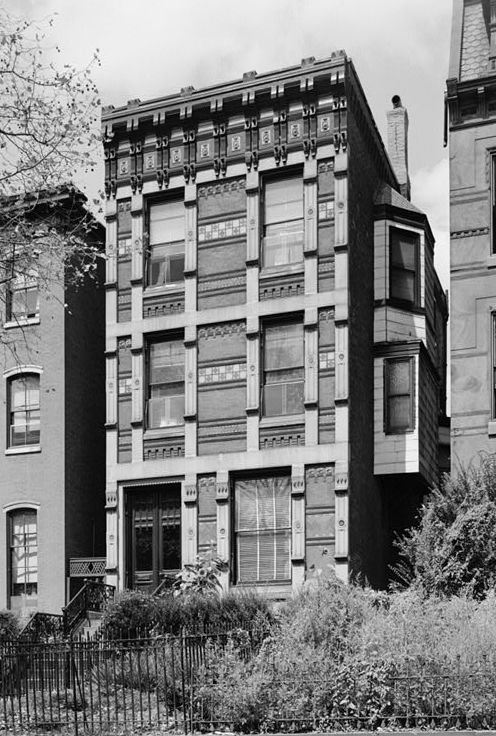
Morris Fleisher House, 2223 Green St., Philadelphia (circa 1880)

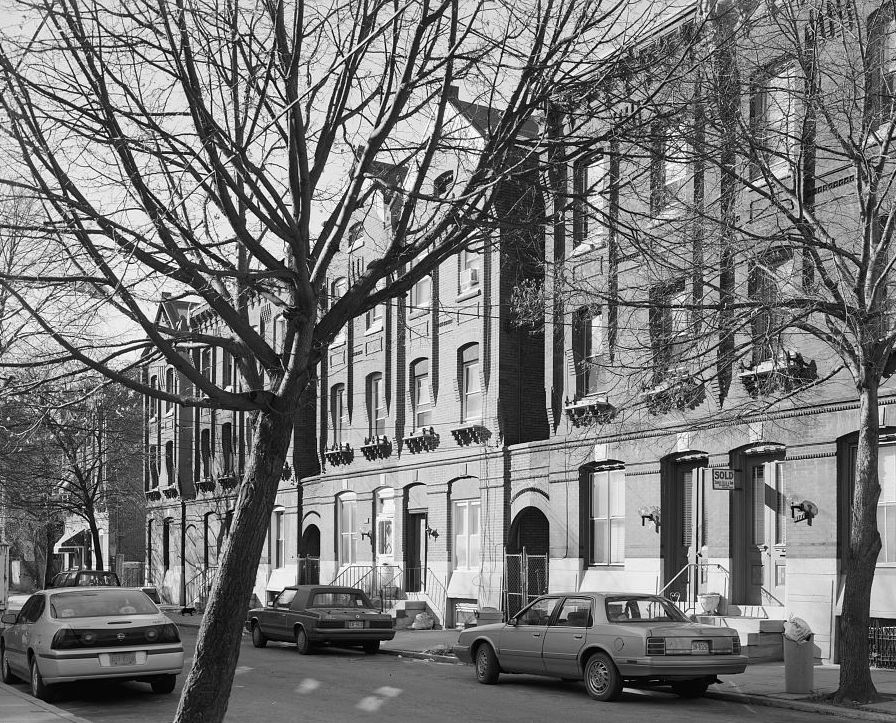
2100-block N. Uber St., Philadelphia (1885–86)

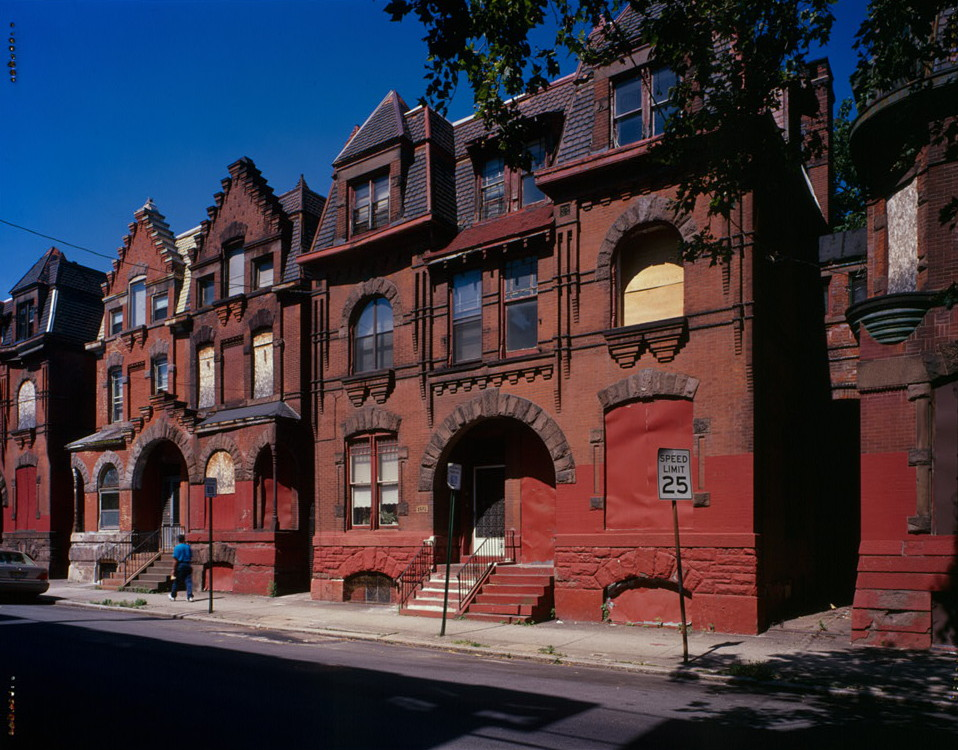
1500-block N. 17th St. (west side), Philadelphia, PA (1886). 29 rowhouses for Peter A. B. Widener and William L. Elkins

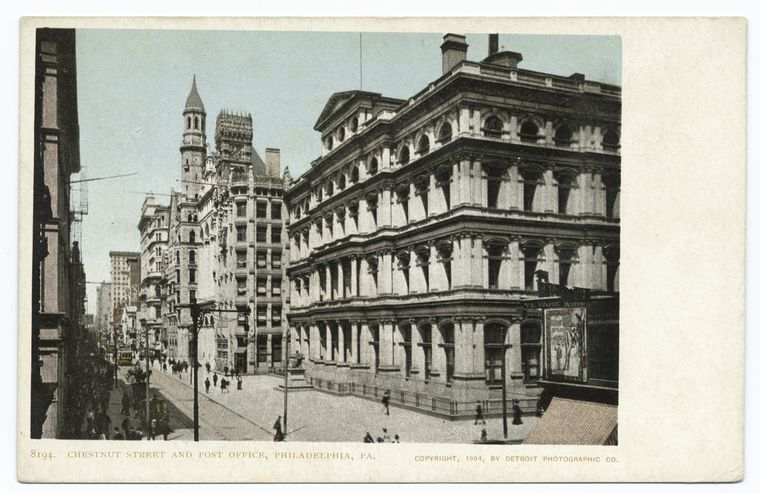
Philadelphia Record Building (center), 917-19 Chestnut St., Philadelphia (1886, demolished).

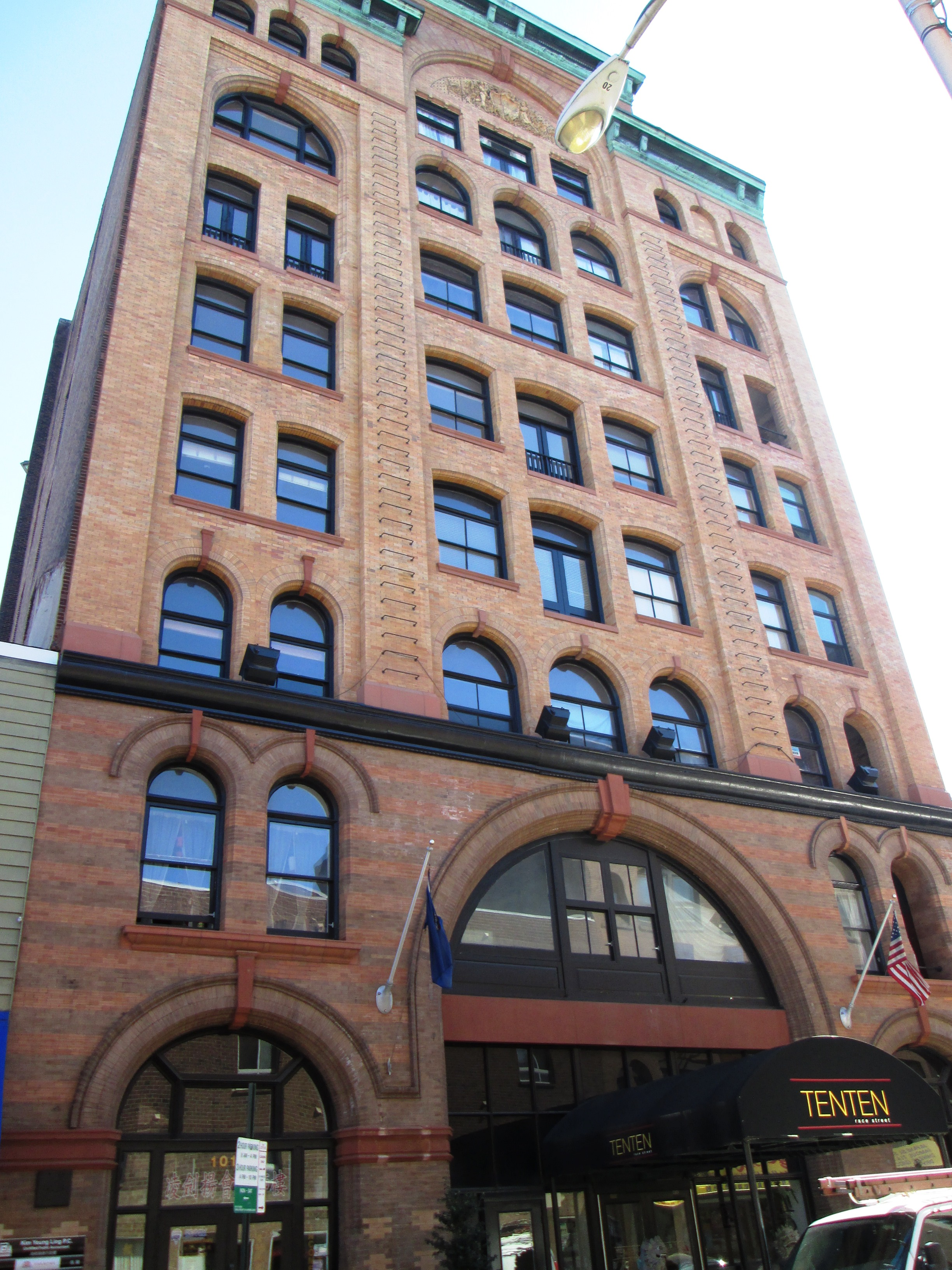
Heywood Chair Factory, 1010-14 Race Street, Philadelphia (1892)

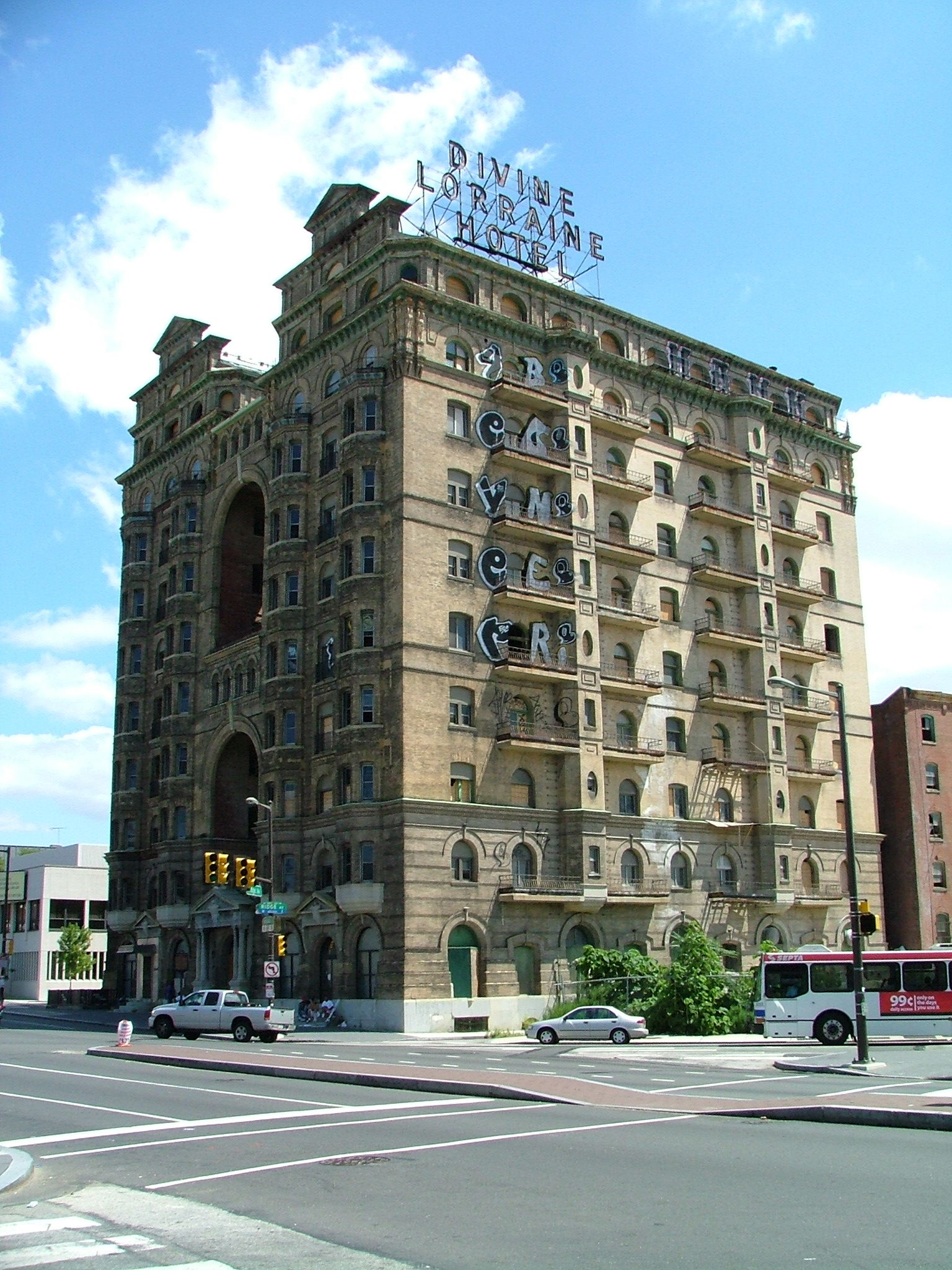
Divine Lorraine Hotel, Broad & Fairmount Sts., Philadelphia (1894–96, interior gutted 2000s).

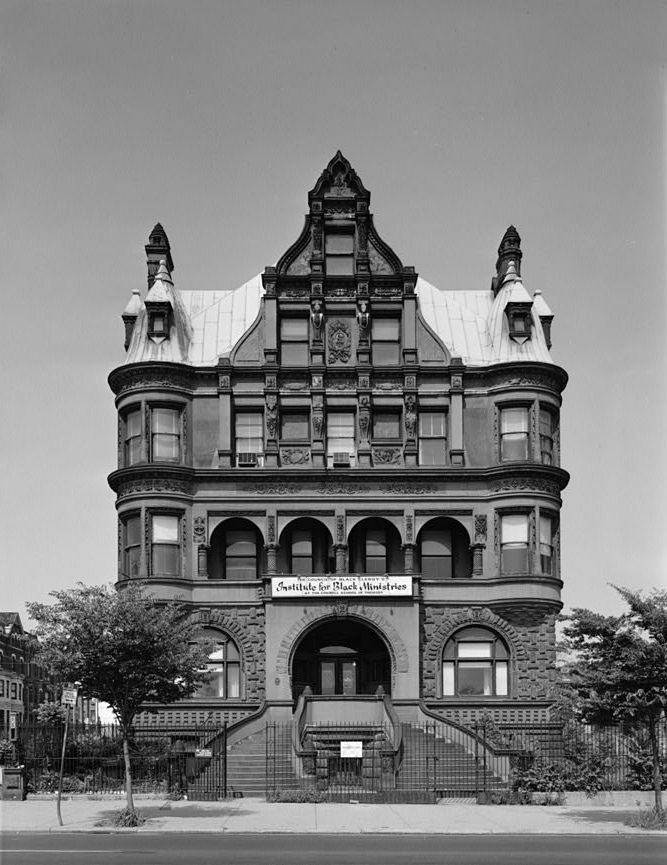
Peter A. B. Widener Mansion in 1973. It burned in 1980, and was demolished

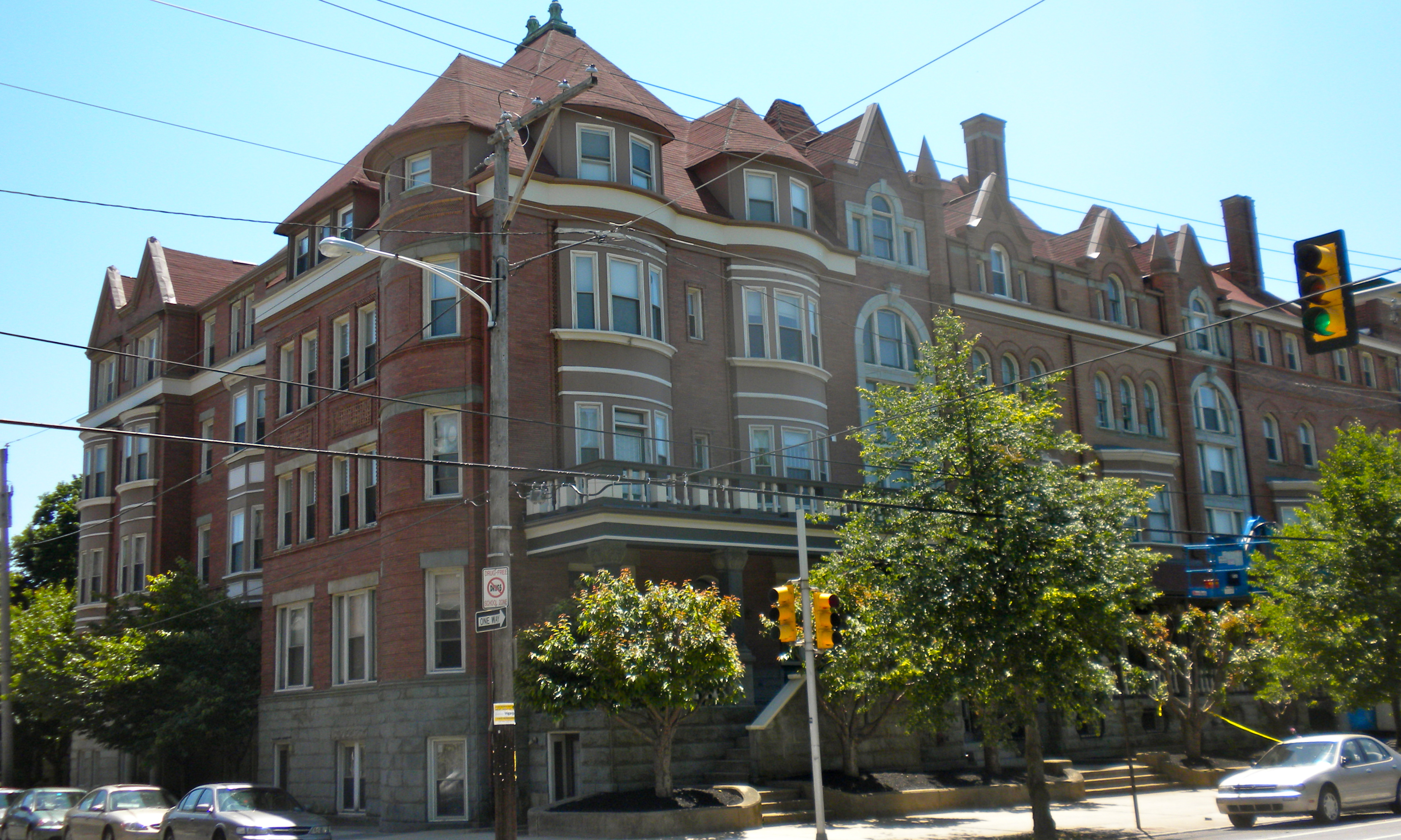
The Powelton, 3500–20 Powelton Avenue, 214–18 North 35th Street, and 215–21 North 36th Street, Philadelphia (1902–08)

George Myers Building in Bethlehem, PA, completed 1892.

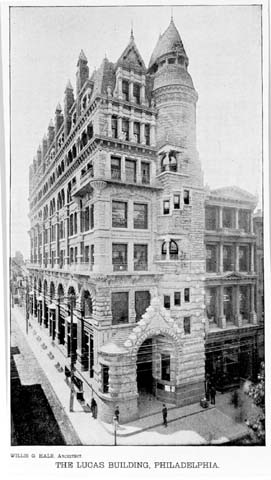
The Lucas Building (now called 'The Hale Building') completed 1889. The architect's office was in this building.

Quaker City National Bank Building, completed 1889.

National Shrine of St. Rita, completed 1884.
