= Heywood Chair Factory =

- U.S. National Register of Historic Places
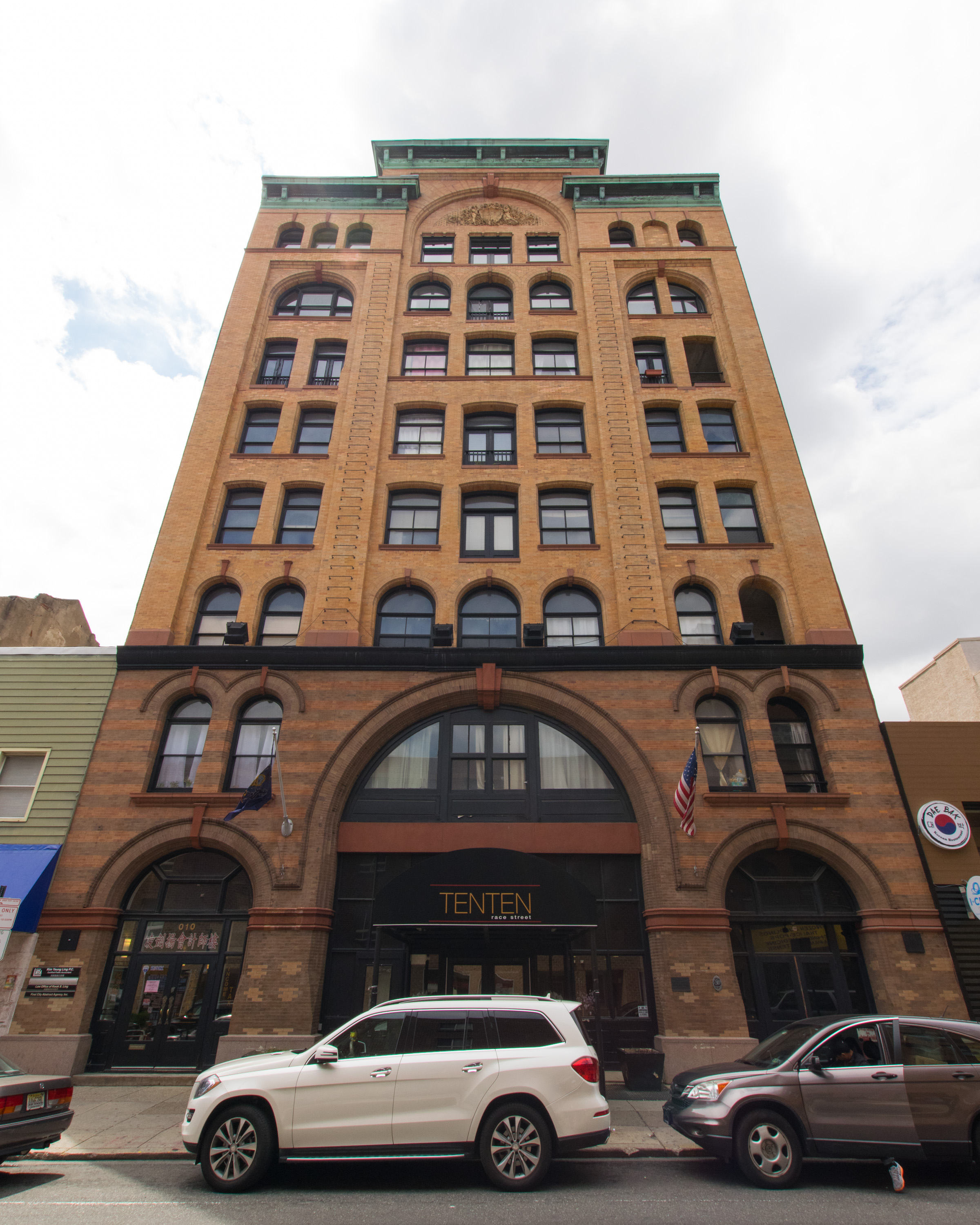
- (2017)

- Location within Philadelphia Location within Pennsylvania Location within the United States
- Location: 1012 Race Street; Philadelphia, Pennsylvania
- Coordinates: 39°57′19″N 75°9′26″W
- Built: 1892
- Architect: Willis G. Hale
- Architectural style: Italian Renaissance
- NRHP reference No.: 84003541
- Added to NRHP: August 23, 1984

The Heywood Chair Factory was a manufacturing facility for bentwood chairs built at 1012 Race St. between N. 10th and N. 11th Streets in 1892 in what is now the Chinatown neighborhood of Philadelphia. It has been converted into condominiums, and was listed on the National Register of Historic Places in 1984.

== See also ==
- National Register of Historic Places listings in Center City, Philadelphia
