= Dove pan =

Magic trick

The dove pan is a classic magic effect in which a magician produces a dove from an empty pan. The illusion continues to be performed by professional and amateur magicians.

== Effect ==
In presentation, the magician demonstrates that the pan is empty and then puts cooking ingredients into the pan – often adding milk or cracking an egg into it or putting a small quantity of a volatile liquid into it and igniting it. To extinguish the fire or "cook" the ingredients, the magician covers the pan with a lid. When the magician removes the lid, a dove flies from the pan which is then shown to be otherwise empty.

== Method ==
The gimmick of the dove pan lies in the design of the lid. The deep-shouldered rim of the lid conceals a pan liner that fits snugly into the main pan. When the lid is placed on the pan the liner is deposited inside it, resembling the main pan when it was displayed empty. The liner, when fitted into the lid, may be loaded with birds (or anything else the magician wishes to produce) before the trick begins. The magician must avoid showing the underside of the lid to the audience while performing the trick.

The effect consists of a shallow pan made of brass or aluminium and a matching lid which has a very deep rim or shoulder all around that fits inside the pan when closed. The pan is usually no more than ten inches in diameter and roughly 2–3 inches deep. Dove pans are a common item at magicians' supply stores.
