= Broad Street (Philadelphia) =

Thoroughfare in Pennsylvania

Coordinates: 39.950827°N 75.163968°W

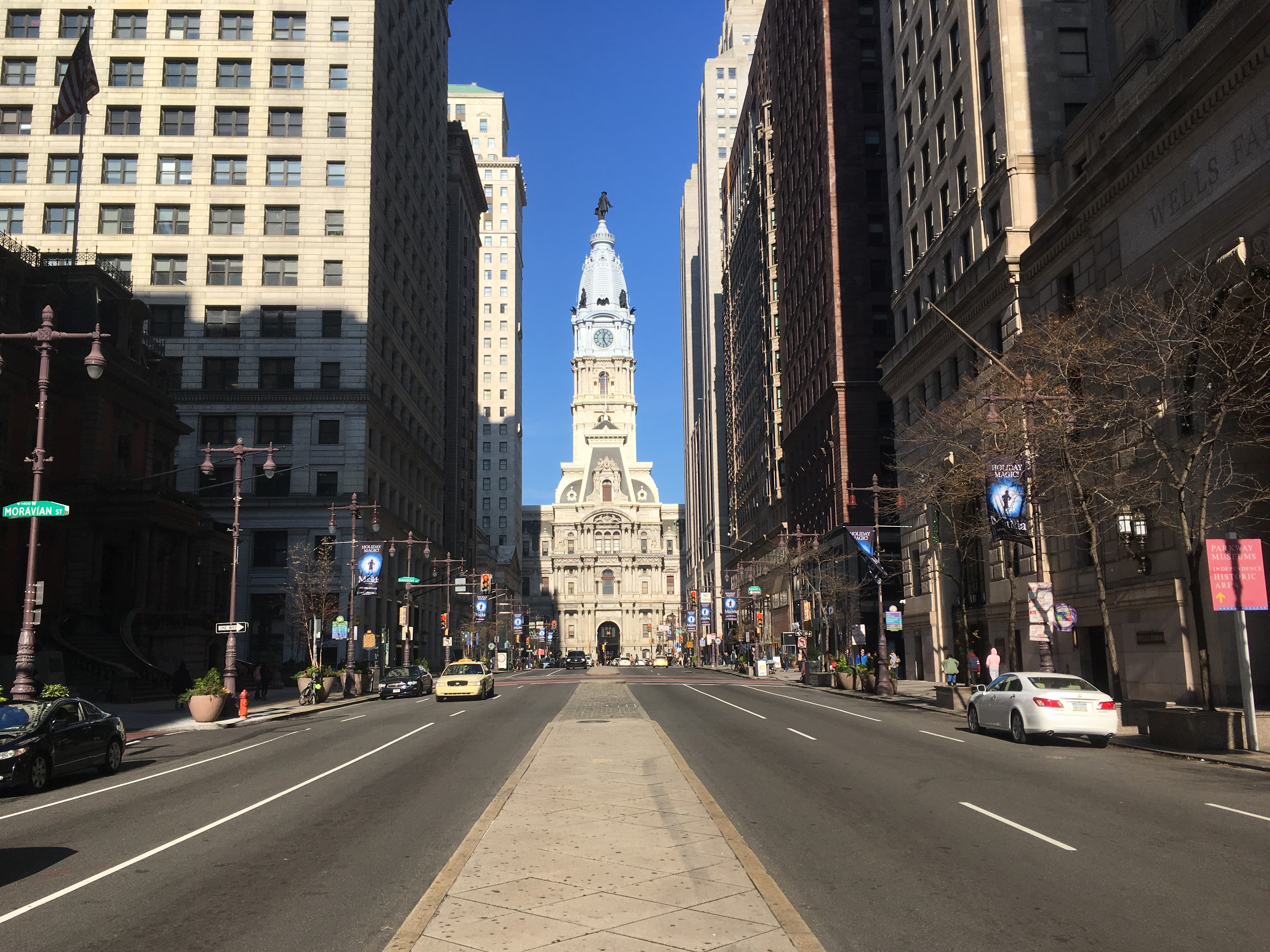
- Broad Street north of Walnut Street in Center City in 2018
- Interactive map of Broad Street
- Maintained by: PennDOT and City of Philadelphia
- Length: 12.4 mi (20.0 km)
- Component highways: PA 611 between I-95 and Old York Road
- Location: Philadelphia, Pennsylvania, U.S.
- South end: Admiral Peary Way in Navy Yard
- Major junctions: I-95 at the Sports Complex; I-76 in Packer Park; PA 3 (John F. Kennedy Boulevard) at Philadelphia City Hall; I-676 / US 30 (Vine Street) in Callowhill; US 1 (Roosevelt Boulevard) / US 13 in Hunting Park
- North end: PA 309 (Cheltenham Avenue) in West Oak Lane

Construction
- Commissioned: 1682

Broad Street is a major arterial street in Philadelphia, Pennsylvania. The street runs for approximately 13 miles (21 km), beginning at the intersection of Cheltenham Avenue on the border of Cheltenham Township and the West/East Oak Lane neighborhoods of North Philadelphia to the Philadelphia Navy Yard in South Philadelphia. It is Pennsylvania Route 611 along its entire length with the exception of its northernmost part between Old York Road and Pennsylvania Route 309 (Cheltenham Avenue) and the southernmost part south of Interstate 95.

Broad Street runs along a north–south axis between 13th Street and 15th Street, containing what would otherwise be known as 14th Street in the Philadelphia grid plan. It is interrupted by Philadelphia City Hall, which stands where Broad and Market Street would intersect in the center of the city. The streets of Penn Square, Juniper Street, John F. Kennedy Boulevard, and 15th Street form a circle around City Hall at this point.

It is one of the earliest planned streets in the United States, and is listed on the National Register of Historic Places as a continuous north–south street, planned by surveyor Thomas Holme and developed for Philadelphia in 1681.

Broad Street is served by many public transit routes, including SEPTA's Broad Street Line subway and several SEPTA city bus routes.

As of 2023, the entire length of Broad Street is part of Philadelphia's High Injury Network, the small fraction of city streets on which the majority of traffic deaths and serious injuries occur.

== History ==
=== 17th century ===
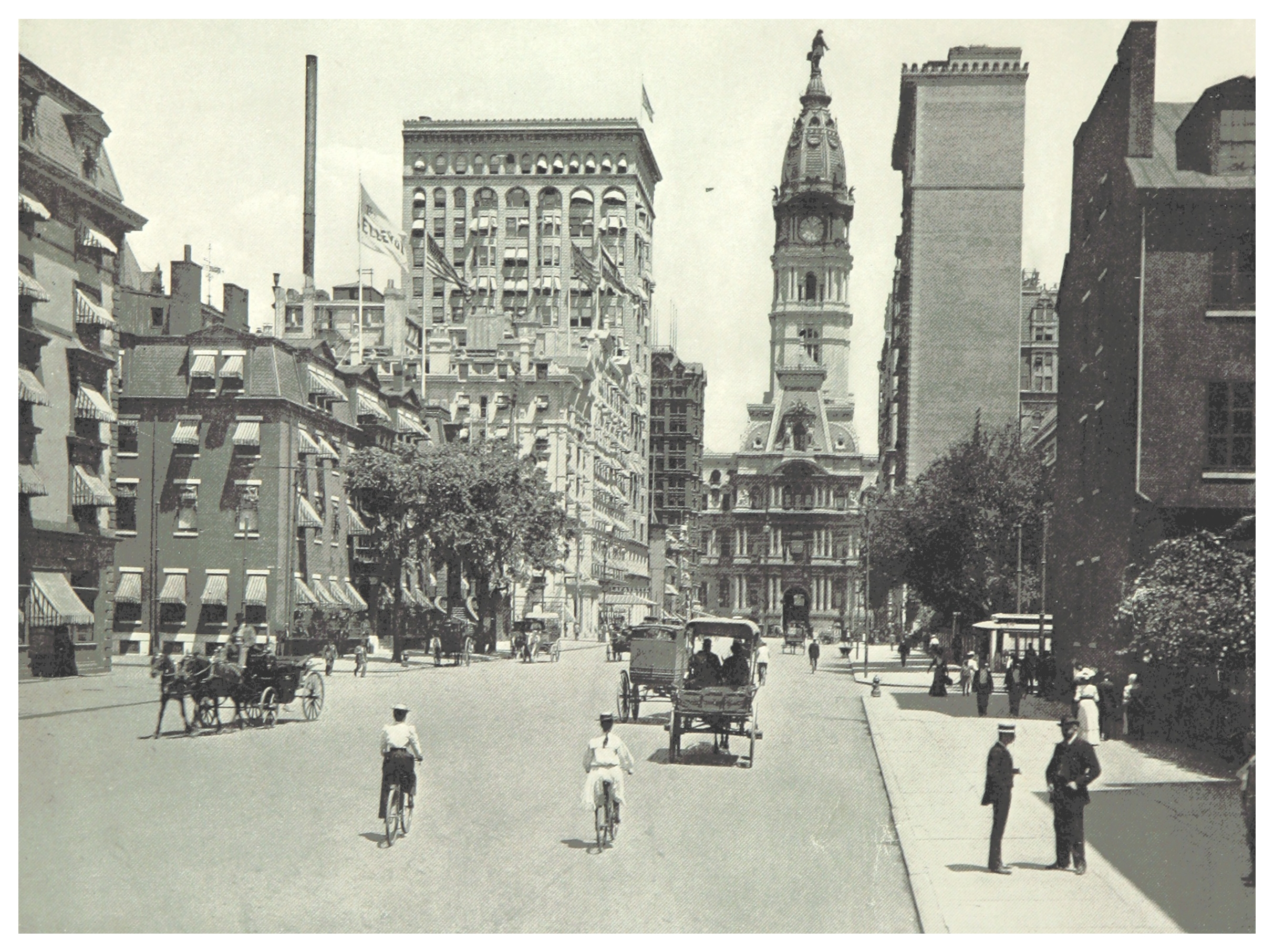
South Broad Street, looking towards Philadelphia City Hall, c. 1895

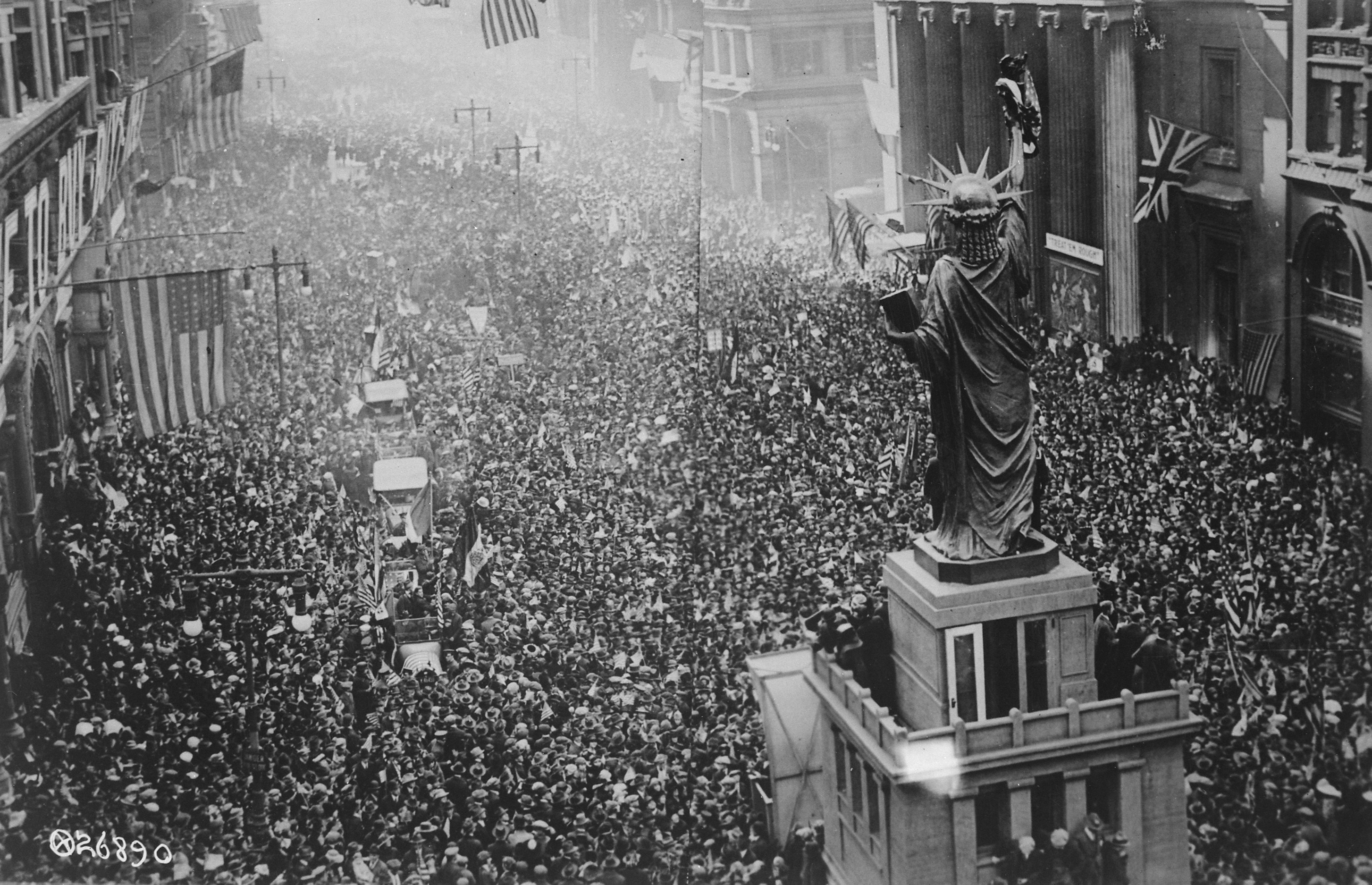
Armistice Day on Broad Street in 1918

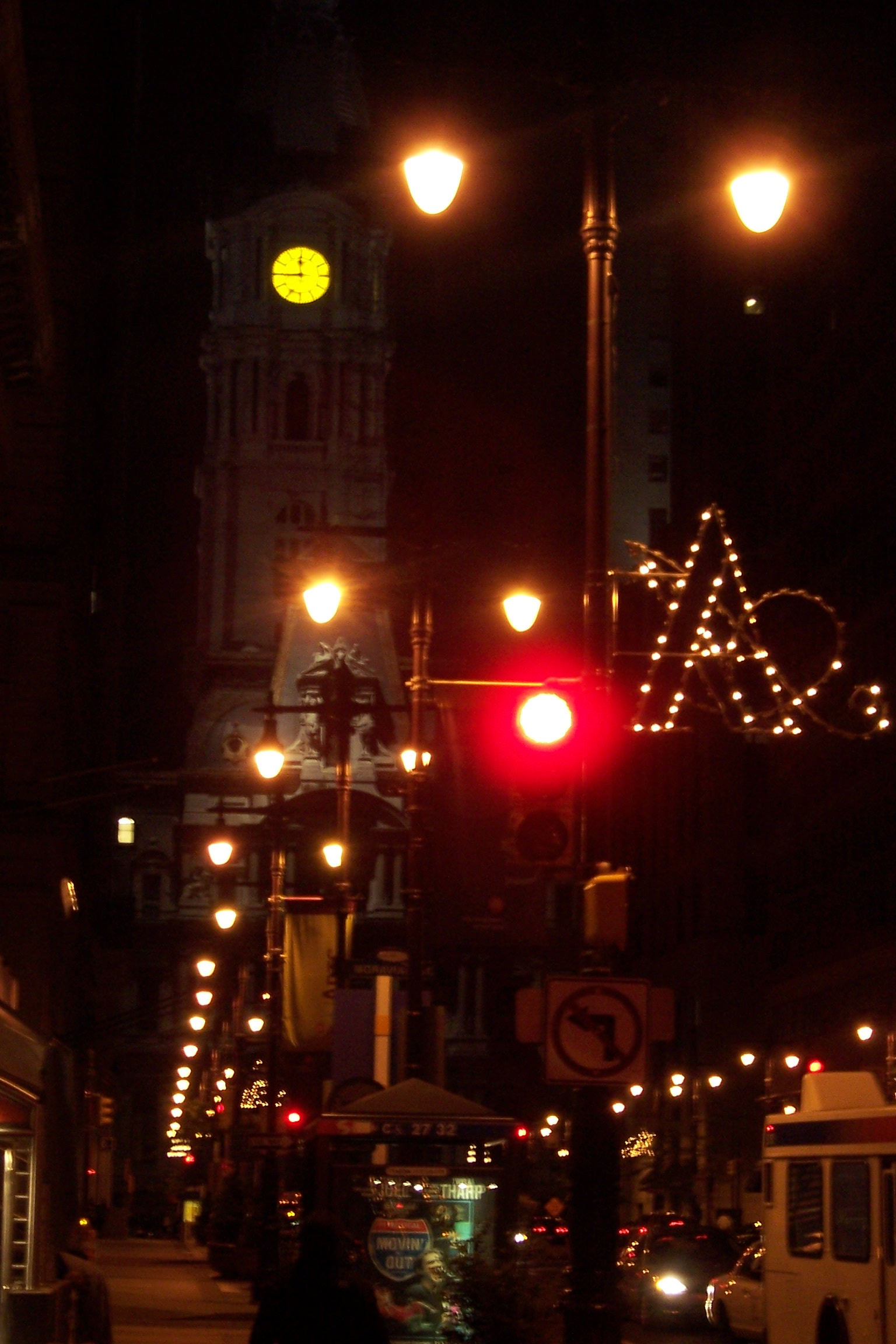
Broad Street at night along the Avenue of the Arts in 2005

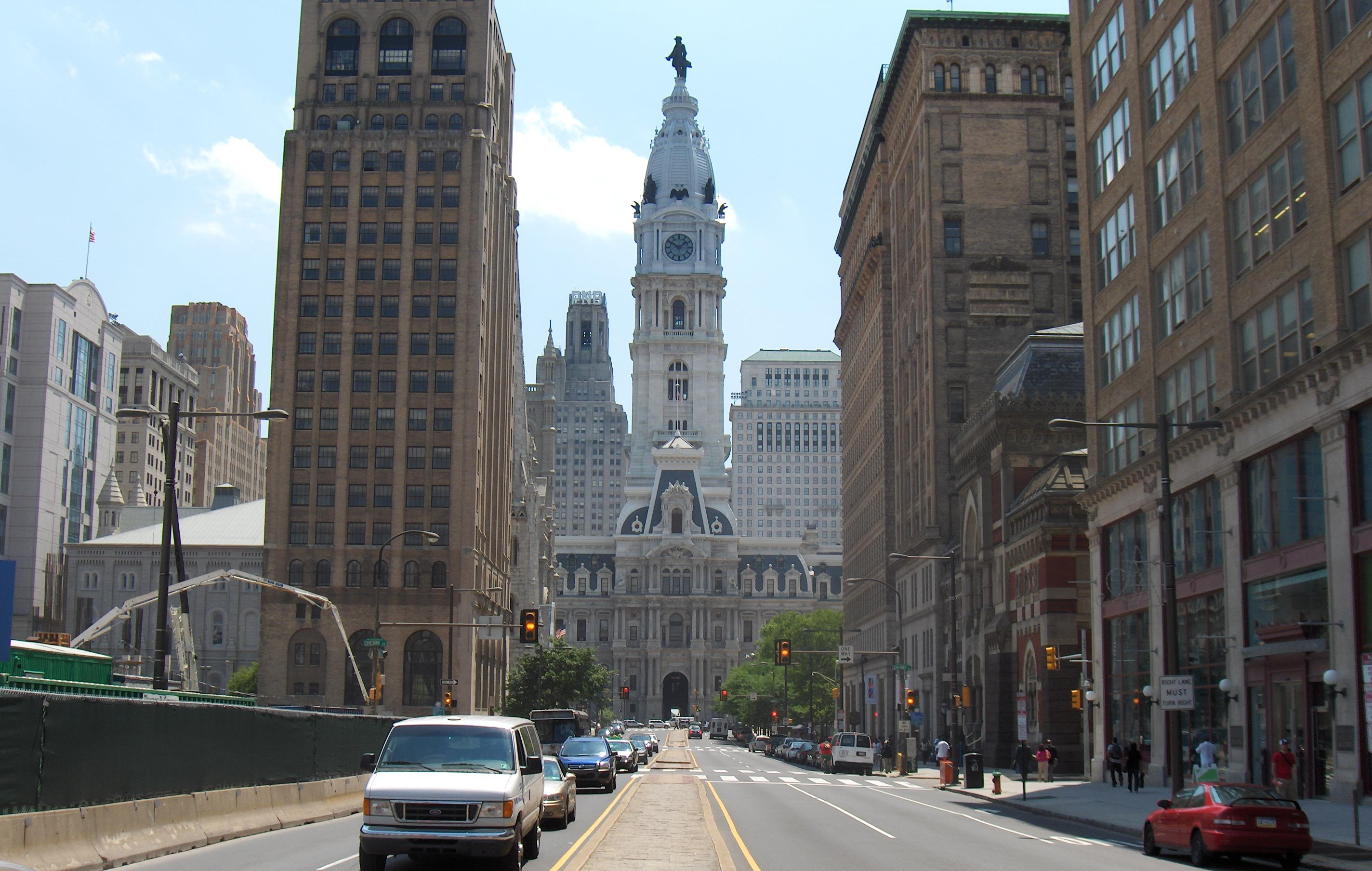
North Broad Street, looking towards City Hall in 2009

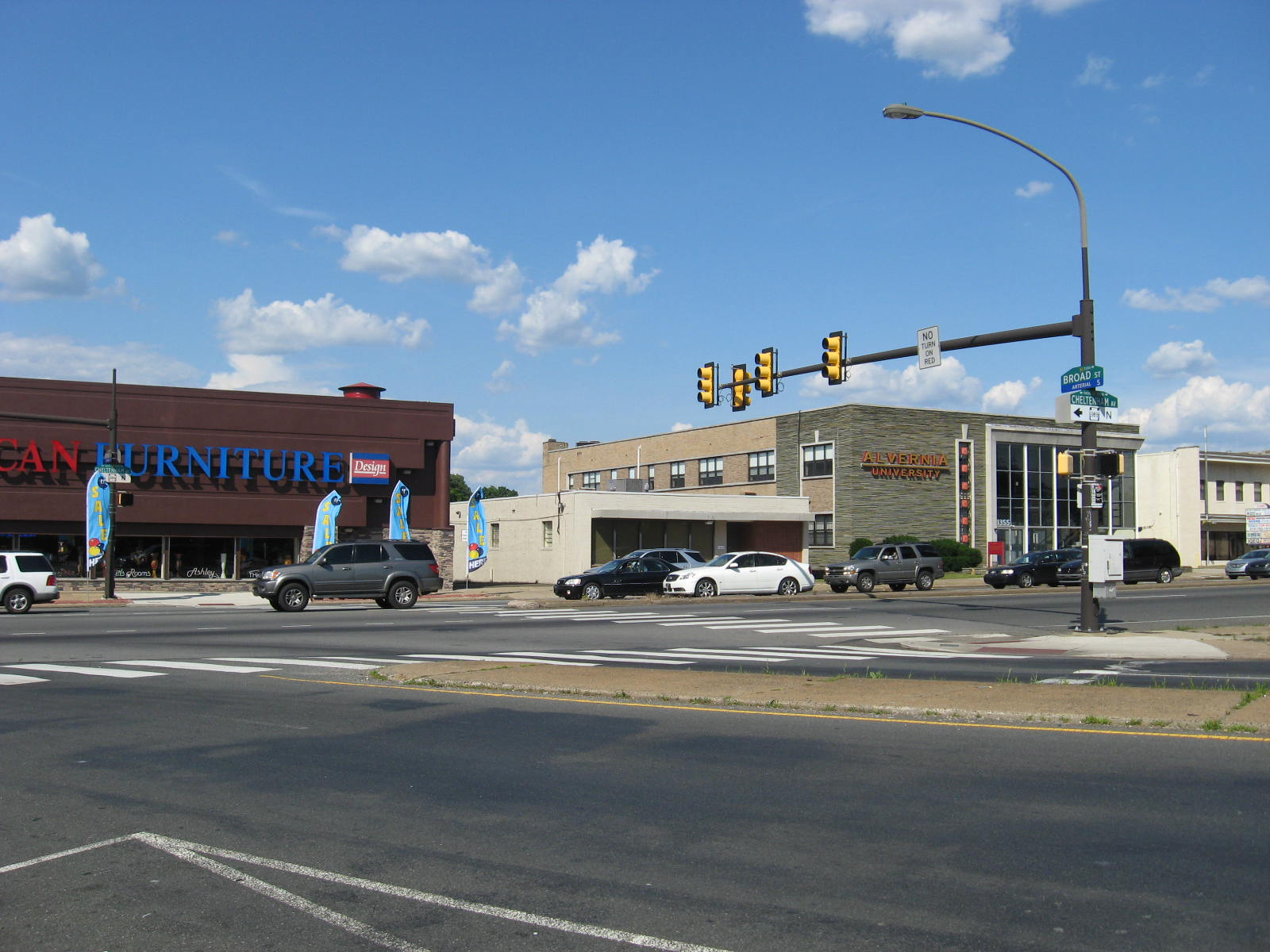
Broad Street's northern terminus on the border of Philadelphia and Cheltenham Township

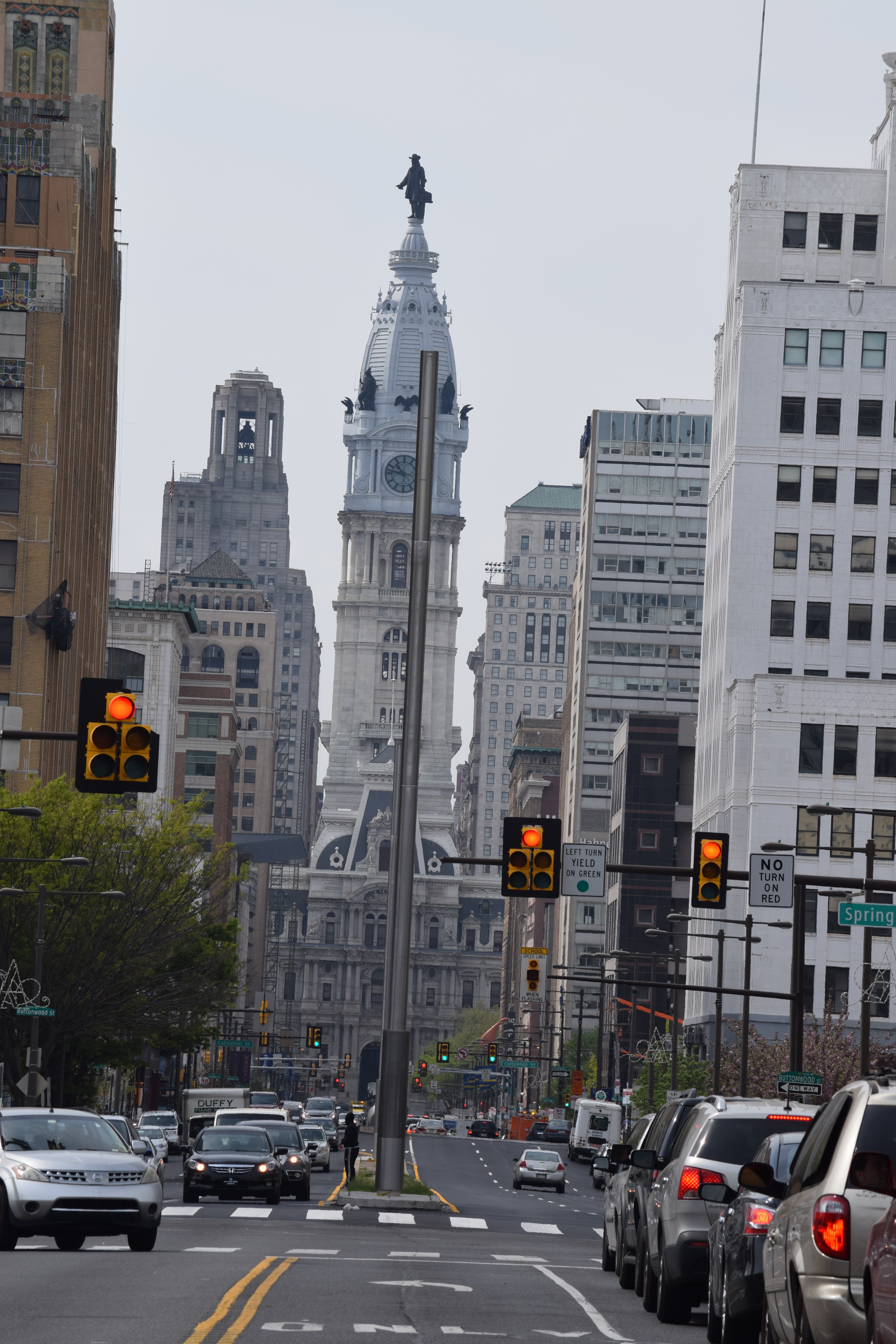
Philadelphia City Hall seen from North Broad Street in 2012

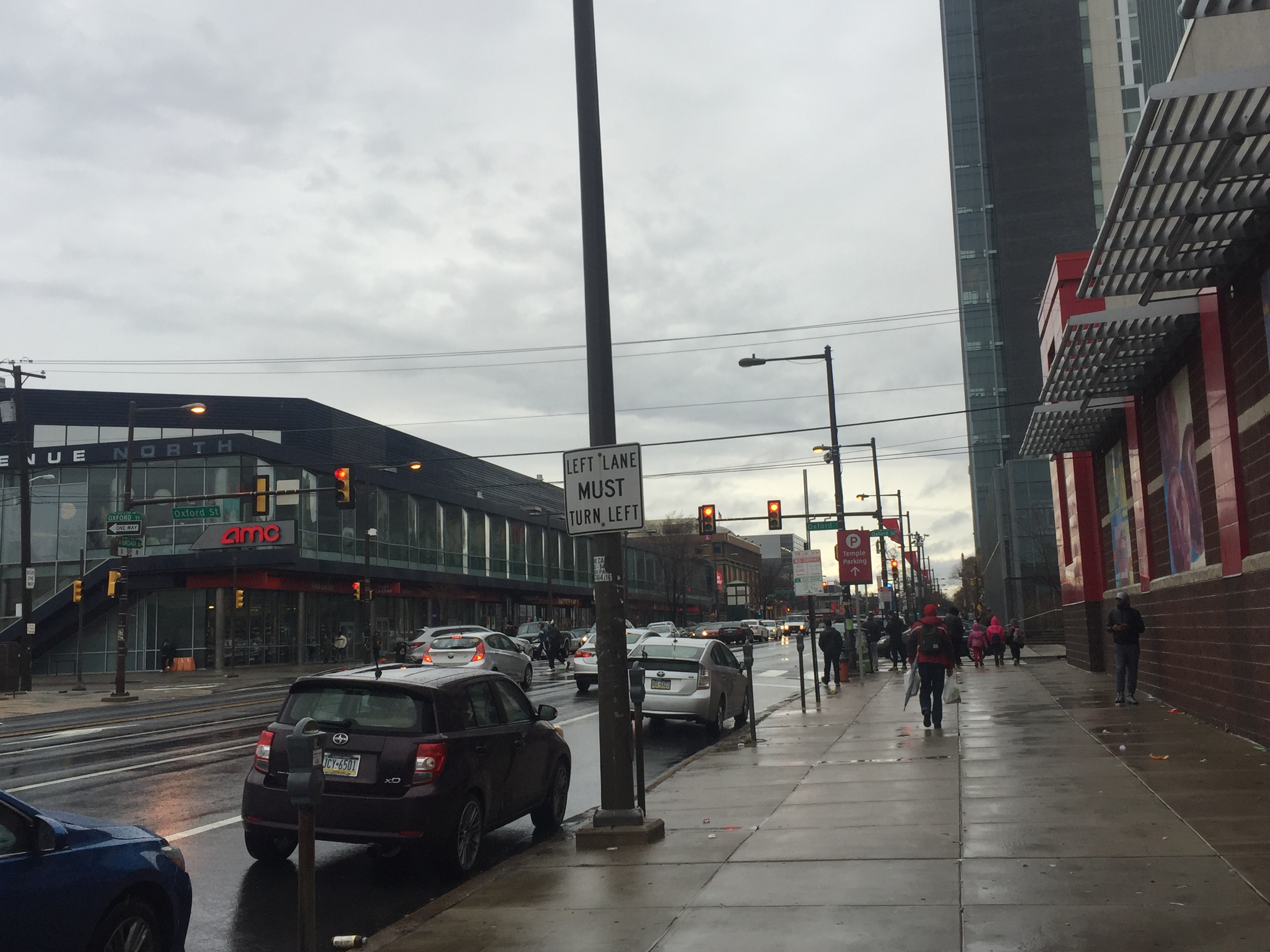
Broad Street in the Cecil B. Moore area near Temple University in 2018

Broad Street has gone through various changes since its beginnings in colonial-era America. Thomas Holme introduced the first geographical plan of the city to William Penn in 1687. Proposing a center square, Holme designed the street to be roughly 100 feet (30 m) across and 13 miles (21 km) long. Penn intended that the center square would eventually be home to Philadelphia City Hall.

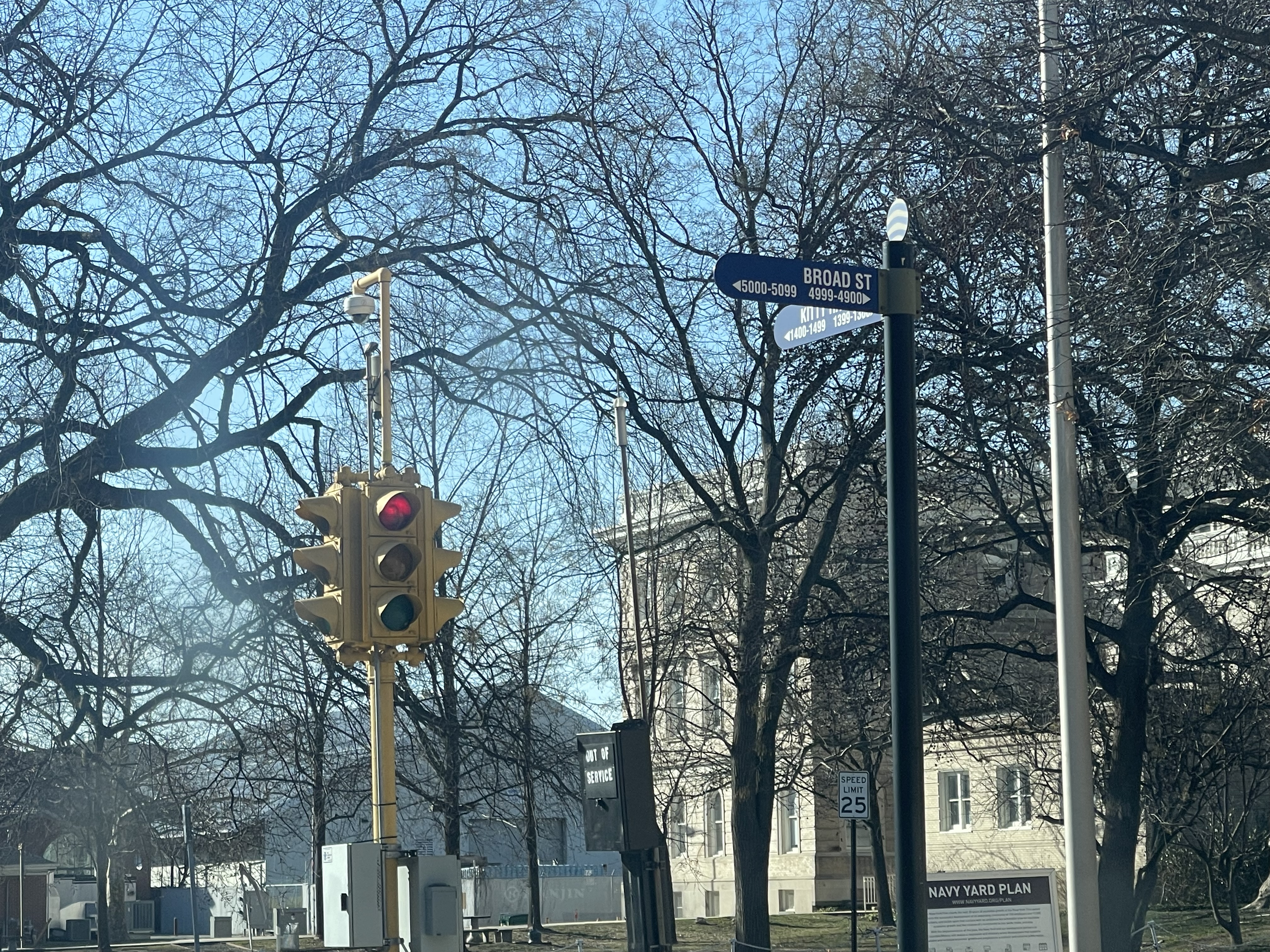
Broad Street and Kitty Hawk Avenue 2024

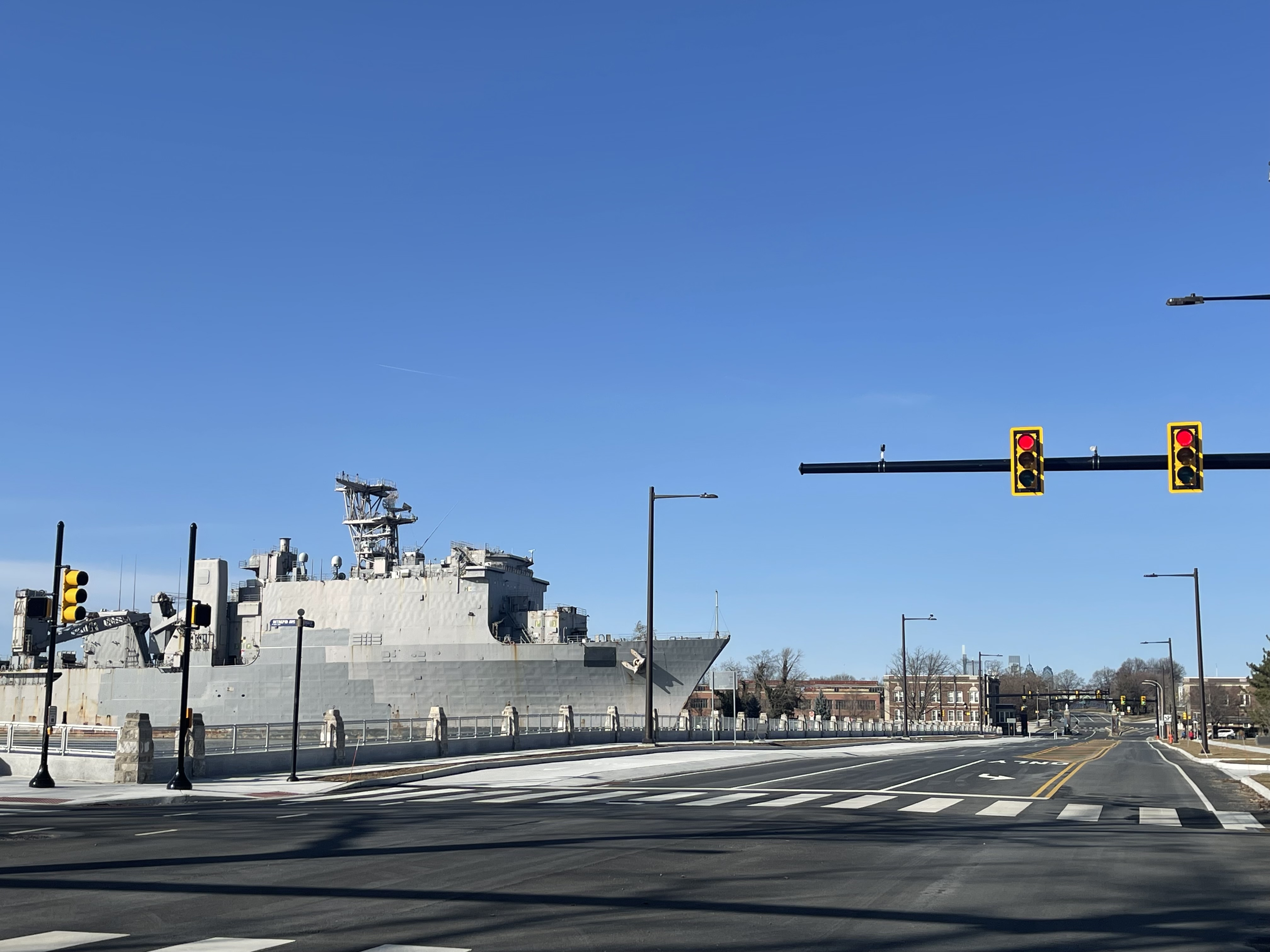
Broad Street inside the Navy Yard

=== 18th century ===
During the American Revolutionary War, Broad Street was often settled by Continental Army troops moving in and out of the city. As the city's population grew, Broad Street was extended both north to Vine and south to Dickinson, eventually reaching the Delaware River waterfront, where today's Philadelphia Naval Shipyard stands. It remains Philadelphia's longest straightaway and one of the longest urban boulevards in the United States.

=== 19th century ===
During the early 19th century, Broad Street was home to many wealthy residents, especially around the Rittenhouse Square area. Homes were designed in Victorian and Gothic styles. South Broad became center for the fine arts with the establishment of the Academy of Music in 1857.

The Pennsylvania Academy of the Fine Arts and Adelphi Theater were also built during the same time period. Banks and offices grew in number around center city as well as high rise structures. The corner of Spring Garden housed Baldwin Locomotive Works founded by Matthias Baldwin in 1825. Baldwin's company was one of the biggest steam locomotive producers before the transition to diesel powered trains. Broad Street's biggest addition came with the construction of City Hall intersecting Broad and Market.

With the progression of the Industrial Revolution, Philadelphia became a center for trade and commerce. Transportation growth gained prominence with the construction of the Broad Street Station in 1881. The Park Theatre at the intersection of Broad and Fairmont Ave. opened on September 16, 1889.

Social life dominated the street during the second half of the 19th century. Elaborate hotels such as the Divine Lorraine and the Majestic were centers for nightlife. Standing over 10 stories tall the Lorraine was one of the tallest residential structures in Philadelphia. Private clubs such as the Columbia and Mercantile were popular during the Gilded Age.

=== 20th century ===
At the turn of the 20th century, Broad Street transformed from a bustling boulevard to a cultural magnet for music and the arts. On January 1, 1901, the very first Mummers Day parade was held, becoming a staple of Philadelphia culture. As jazz and gospel music grew in popularity in Philadelphia with the Great Migration of the early 1900s, numerous jazz and blues clubs opened in the city, including the Uptown Theater, which was built on North Broad Street in 1927.

By the 1950s, Broad Street residential areas had been replaced with skyscrapers as well as the newly developed Penn Center.

Since the 1970s, the street has undergone various city renovations. Using $100 million in public funds, Broad received new lighting and streetscaping, theater restorations and new restaurants and cafes. Lamp post fixtures have been improved as well as sidewalk pavements and subway entrances.

=== 21st century ===
In 2015, Philadelphia Mayor Michael Nutter introduced a $8.7 million project to brighten North Broad with 41 stainless steel light masts.

In early 2025, the Philadelphia Parking Authority installed 15 speed cameras along Broad Street from Pattison Ave to Old York Road. These cameras capture any vehicle going 11+ mph above the 25 mph limit and automatically issue a ticket to the offending vehicle. A ten-block section of South Broad Street began undergoing renovations in 2026 as part of the $150 million Avenue of the Arts reconstruction project.

=== Southern Boulevard Parkway ===
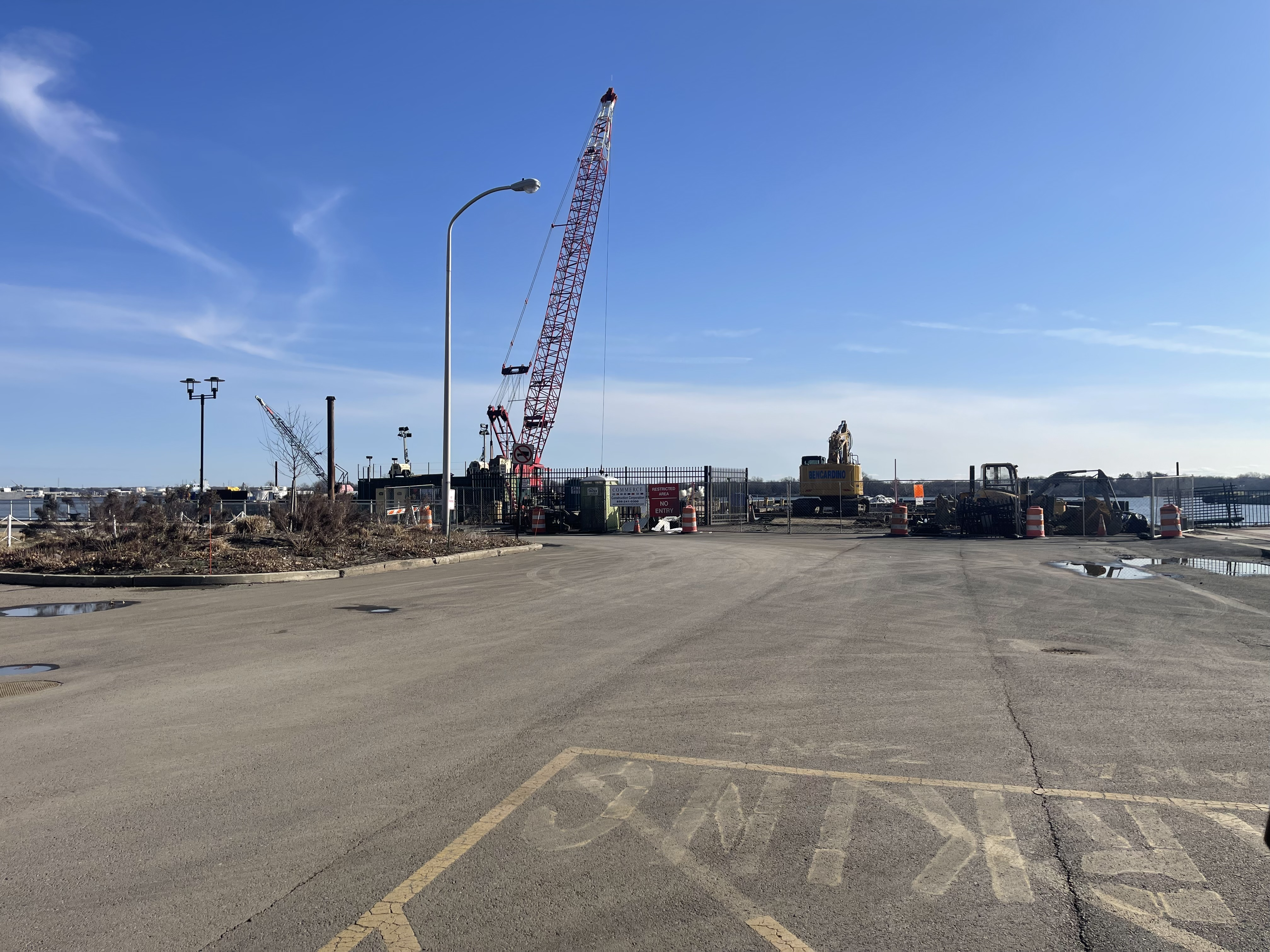
Southern terminus of Broad Street at Admiral Peary Way in Navy Yard

Southern Boulevard Parkway is a landscaped segment of South Broad Street in Philadelphia, connecting Marconi Plaza and FDR Park from Oregon Avenue at Broad Street southward five intersections to the gateway entrance of the Philadelphia Navy Yard. The parkway consists of the central median landscaped area including the bordering east and west tree lined sidewalks and various sized green spaces which separates opposing lanes of traffic, and roadway intersections. Broad Street is a historic city street and this landscaped segment is bordered by an urban residential townhome community and the entrance to the major venues of the South Philadelphia Sports Complex and Stateside Live!, and the Philadelphia Navy Yard.

In 1904, a plan for park and parkway improvements in South Philadelphia was designed by Samuel Parsons Jr., but work stopped by 1910. In 1912, the city's director of public works, Morris Cooke, engaged Olmsted Brothers, an architecture firm, to produce designs for League Island Park, Oregon Plaza and the stretch of south Broad Street from Oregon Avenue south to Pattison Avenue and southward to League Island. The unifying medial green space including the tree lined sidewalks on the east and west connected the two parks developed from river swamp lands that were filled and regraded.

In 1926, a second Parkway was constructed on Moyamensing Avenue from Oregon Avenue to the intersection of Packer Avenue, and Packer Avenue was extended from 20th Street to Broad Street (Southern Boulevard) for access to the Sesquicentennial Exposition. The two parks were later renamed Marconi Plaza and FDR Park, and the median landscaping was named Southern Boulevard.

Olmsted's design was centered on the availability of open space to all residents. Olmsted wanted to create a place that took advantage of the best characteristics that the city and the country had to offer. The intended result was to create a Suburban Village by blending the countryside with the urban environments and developing an organization of open space, views and providing the advantages of increased health benefits of purity of air and facilities for quiet out-of-door recreation. This original concept design facilitated surrounding development in the next century of a thriving urban residential community, countryside recreation and the focal location point for regional metropolitan spectator sporting events.

The Boulevard was the main entrance and central roadway in the 1926 Sesquicentennial Exposition, a world's fair hosted in Philadelphia, to celebrate the 150th anniversary of the signing of the United States Declaration of Independence, and the 50th anniversary of the 1876 Centennial Exposition. Open green areas, parking, and large exposition buildings flanked the Boulevard lined with linden trees and flowering crab apple trees, individual obelisks as the 13 columns for each of the original Thirteen Colonies known as the "Founders Pylons", various standards, banners, and an 80 foot high 27 ton replica of the Liberty Bell at the gateway of Oregon Plaza. The Boulevard was illuminated at night with visual displays of the Liberty Bell surrounded with 26,000 light bulbs, the Founder Pylons each with a searchlight projecting skyward, and the shooting projection of lights from the Tower Of Light. This provided an effect for that time period.

The structures were demolished or removed following the close of the exposition, but the area continued to draw development in the 1960s with a new stadium, bowling alley, drive in movie theater, movie theater, and the Aquarama Aquarium Theater of the Sea.

The development pattern continued with the construction of two venues for Philadelphia's four primary professional athletic teams, the 76ers, Eagles, Flyers, Phillies. Veterans Stadium, an outdoor stadium that opened in 1971 and closed in 2003, was the home field of the Eagles and Phillies. The Spectrum, an indoor arena that opened in 1967 and closed in 2009, was the home stadium of the 76ers and Flyers.

Although the thoroughfare carried the name of Broad Street the green space was officially designated in the 1950s Philadelphia Home Rule City Charter as part of the Fairmount Park urban park system as parkland, to be known as Southern Parkway. No traces of this name exist in this area today and it is merely referred to as part of Broad Street.

== Cultural landmarks ==
=== Arts ===
Broad Street is home to several Philadelphia cultural landmarks. Broad Street between Spruce and Market Streets is known as the Avenue of the Arts, and includes the Academy of Music, and the Kimmel Center. Two blocks north of City Hall is the Pennsylvania Academy of the Fine Arts, and further north is the New Freedom Theatre.

=== Athletics ===
The South Philadelphia Sports Complex, near Broad's south end along Southern Boulevard Parkway, is the site of Citizens Bank Park, Lincoln Financial Field, and Xfinity Mobile Arena. Demolished sports facilities located in this area were John F. Kennedy Stadium, the Spectrum, and Veterans Stadium. As a result, the Philadelphia Flyers are nicknamed the "Broad Street Bullies".

South of the sports complex and interchanges with the Schuylkill Expressway (Interstate 76) and Interstate 95, Broad Street has its southern terminus in the former Philadelphia Naval Shipyard.

Joe Frazier's Gym, the personal training gym and home where former heavyweight boxing champion Joe Frazier lived and trained in preparation for his fight against Mohammed Ali and George Foreman, is located at the corner of Broad St. and W. Glenwood Ave champion boxer; it has since been turned into a furniture store.

=== Media and academia ===
The former offices for The Philadelphia Inquirer and Philadelphia Daily News newspapers are on Broad Street just north of City Hall and the former PA State Building is at the intersection with Spring Garden Street. The Public School District Administration relocated between these two landmarks.

Also located on North Broad at its intersection with Fairmount Avenue is the historic Divine Lorraine Hotel. Farther north, Broad passes through the campus of Temple University and its performing arts center, which opened in 1891. Once a Baptist temple, it has now become a prime part of the Avenue of the Arts.

=== 40th parallel ===
Where Broad Street intersects with Clearfield Street in North Philadelphia is the exact location of the 40th Parallel.

== Traditions and customs ==
=== Broad Street Run ===
One of the busiest streets in the country, Broad Street is shut down for the annual 10-mile (16 km) Broad Street Run. Passing by some of Philadelphia's most famous landmarks, the course averages over 35,000 participants a year.

=== Mummers Parade ===
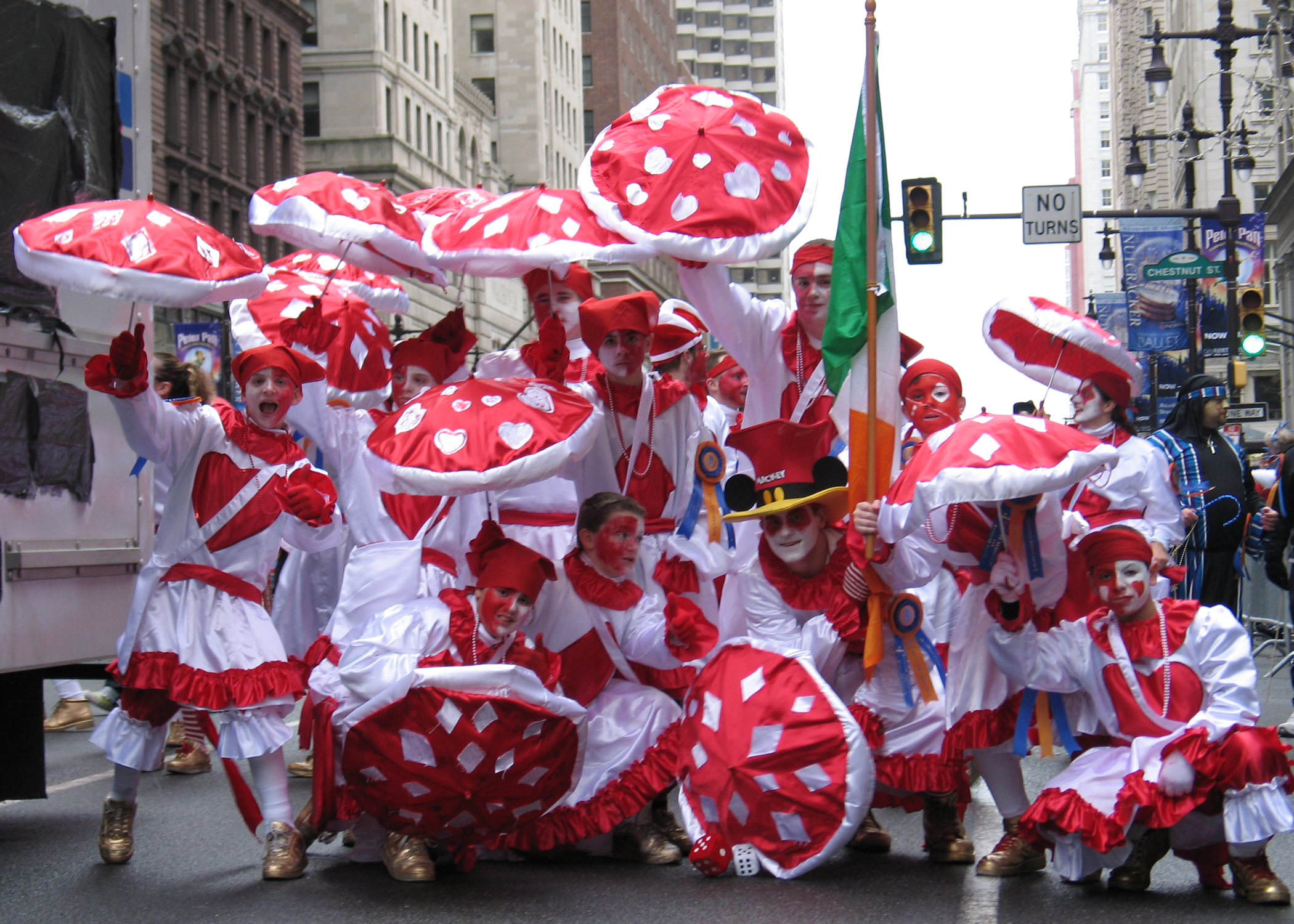
Mummers in the Mummers Parade at Broad and Chestnut Streets in 2008

Broad Street from Oregon Avenue at Marconi Plaza to City Hall, in South Philadelphia and Center City, is the location of the Mummers Parade, which has been held annually every New Year's Day since 1901.

=== Philadelphia sports parades ===
Broad Street often serves as the main parade route for Philadelphia sports championship parades, most recently for the Eagles Super Bowl LIX victory. During the Phillies 2008 World Series victory parade, an estimated two million people lined Broad Street.

The largest gathering for a championship parade was for the Philadelphia Flyers in 1974.

=== South Philadelphia parking schemes ===
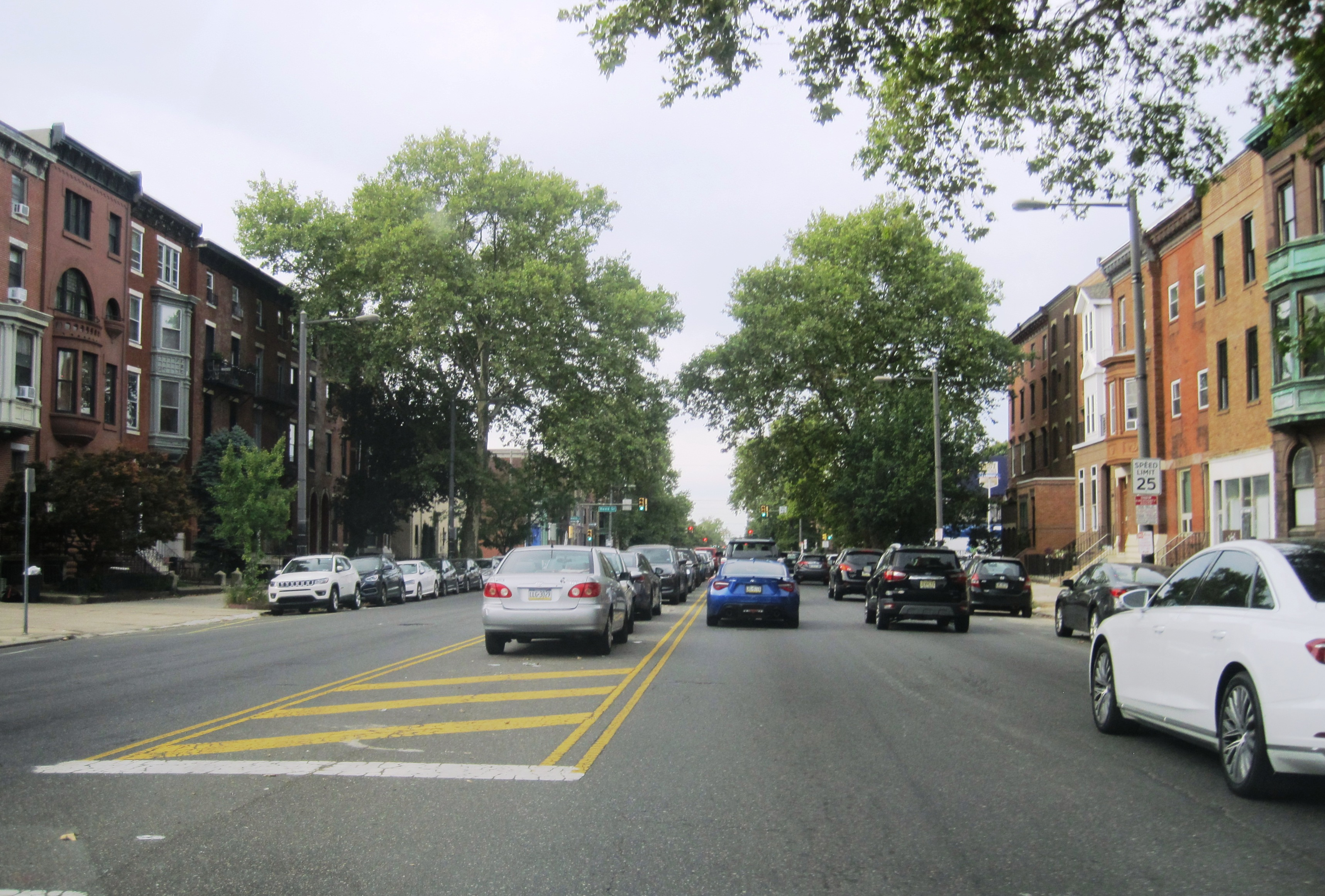
The unusual center parking scheme on South Broad Street at Broad and Wharton Streets in South Philadelphia in 2022

Since the 1980s, residents and visitors have often parked illegally in the striped median strip of Broad Street, which is paved in the same way as the road surface and is not raised, particularly in South Philadelphia, with the city and parking authority rarely enforcing the law against doing so except during major events such as the Broad Street Run.

== Public transportation ==
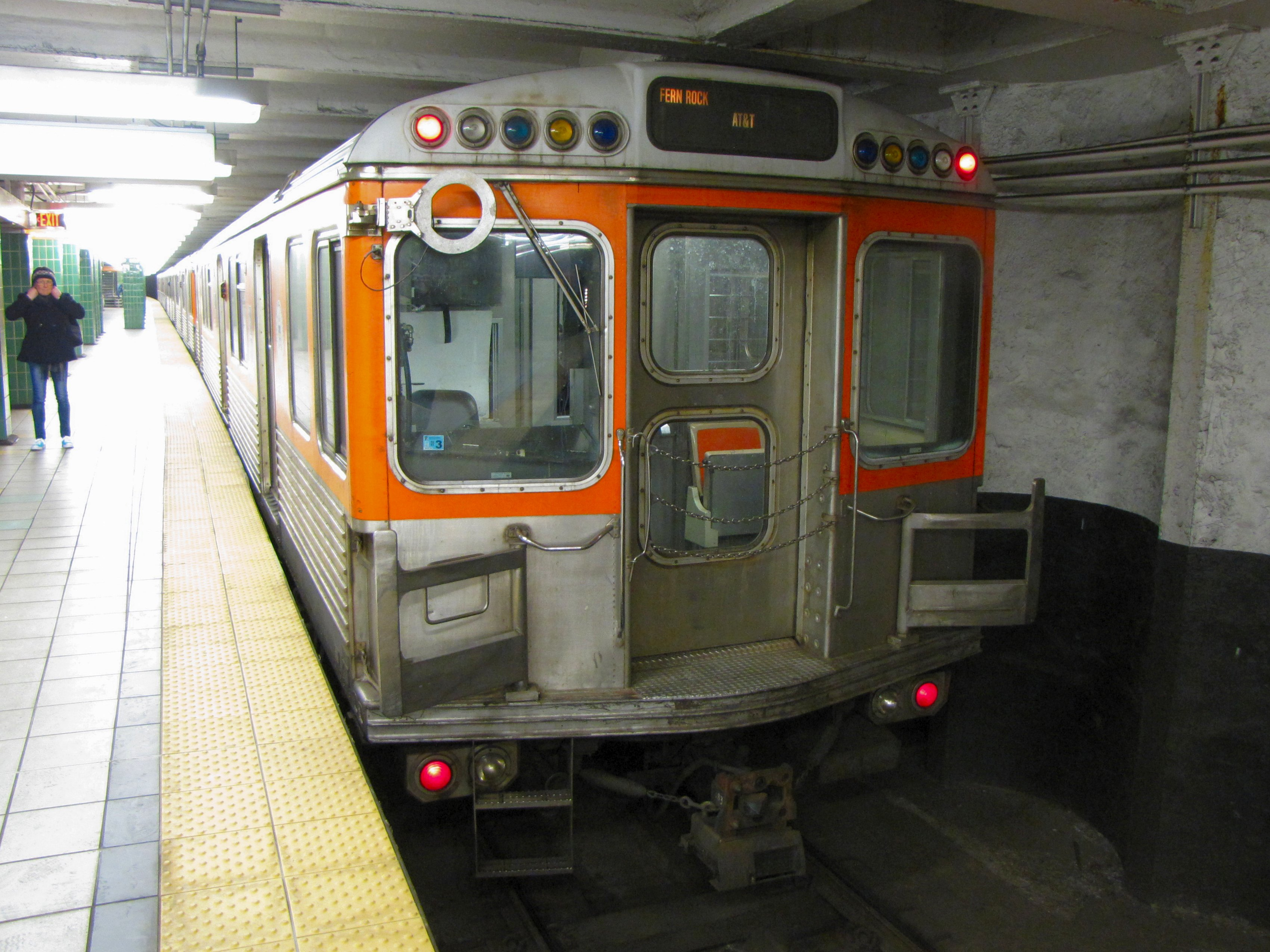
SEPTA Metro's B subway route (formerly the Broad Street Line) in 2010

Public transportation along Broad Street includes SEPTA Metro's B subway route, which served an average of about 137,000 riders per weekday in 2010, running beneath Broad Street for most of its length. The subway starts at the Fern Rock Transportation Center in the Fern Rock neighborhood in North Philadelphia and begins to follow Broad Street at the Olney Transportation Center, extending south through Center City to NRG Station at Pattison Avenue in South Philadelphia.

Several SEPTA City Bus routes run along Broad Street, with Routes 4 and 16 following Broad Street for most of their routes. The Route 4 bus follows Broad Street from Pattison Avenue in South Philadelphia north to Rising Sun Avenue in North Philadelphia, where it diverges to the east to head to the Fern Rock Transportation Center. The Route 16 bus follows Broad Street from Philadelphia City Hall north to its terminus at Cheltenham Avenue, where the bus route continues west along Cheltenham Avenue to the Cheltenham-Ogontz Bus Loop.

== Other names ==
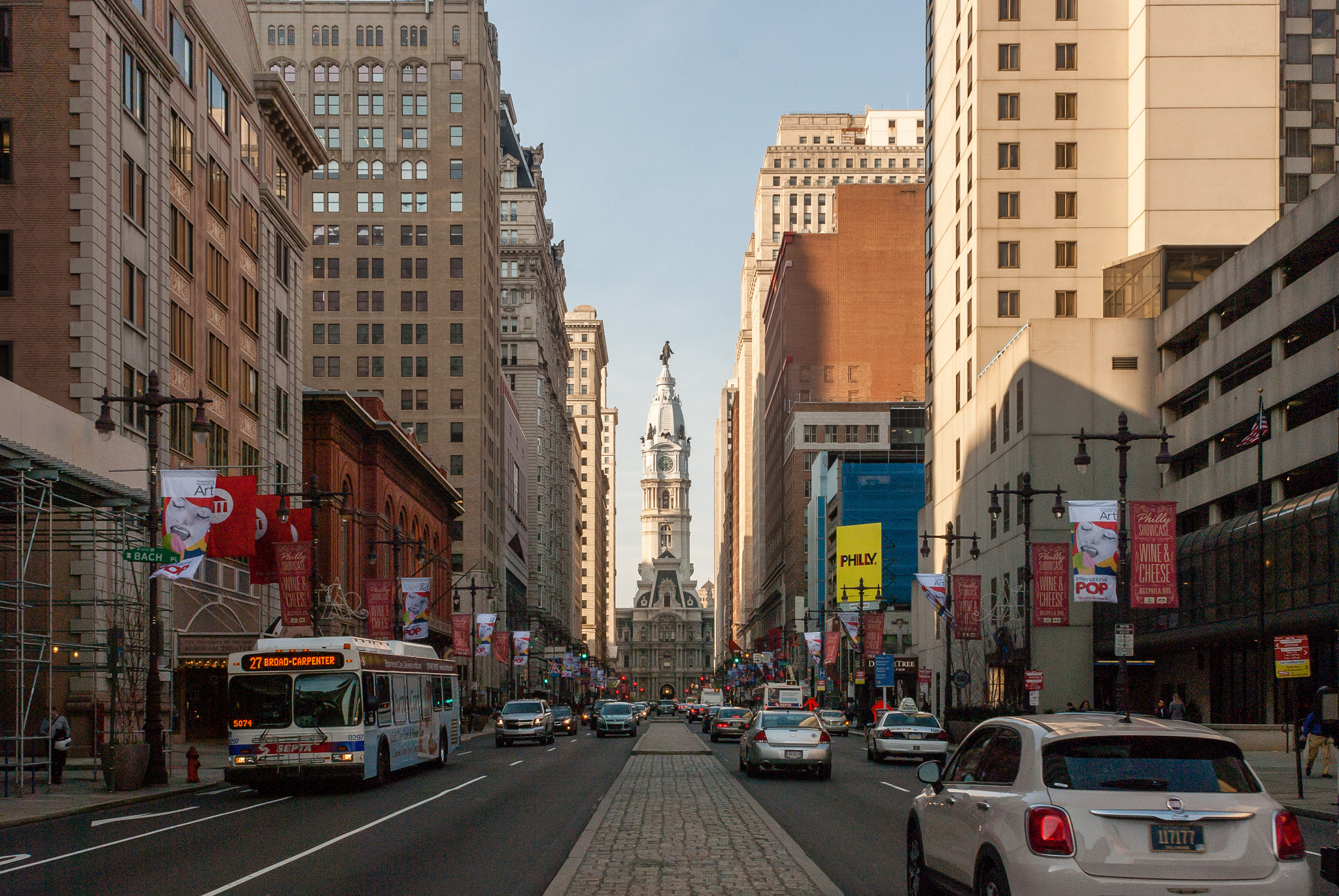
The Avenue of the Arts section of South Broad Street leading to City Hall (in background)

- Avenue of the Arts (from Glenwood Avenue to Washington Avenue). This section of Broad Street includes many prominent theater and concert halls, including the Academy of Music, Kimmel Center for the Performing Arts, Merriam Theater, Wilma Theater, University of the Arts Gershman Hall, and Suzanne Roberts Theater. The street has "AA" lights all along the way, which is the abbreviation for Avenue of the Arts.
- Avenue of the States: from Washington Avenue to Oregon Avenue. Along this section of Broad Street fly the flags of all 50 states in the US.
- Southern Boulevard Parkway: from Oregon Avenue south to Pattison Avenue to the Gatehouse of the Philadelphia Navy Yard connecting Marconi Plaza and FDR Park, an Olmsted Brothers landscape design 1904-1916 and fully utilized as the center roadway for the 1926 Sesquicentennial Exposition world's fair celebrating the birthday of the United States.
- C. A. Tindley Boulevard: from South Street to Washington Avenue. This was dedicated to the late Charles A. Tindley, the father of gospel music. Tindley Temple United Methodist Church was his home, at the corner of Broad and Fitzwater Streets.
- Georgie Woods Boulevard: from Diamond Street to York Street.
- Used to be part of PA 291, from Moyamensing Avenue north to City Hall.

== Major intersections ==
The entire street is in Philadelphia in Philadelphia County.

Location	mi	km	Destinations	Notes
Navy Yard	0.0	0.0	Admiral Peary Way	Southern terminus of Broad Street
Sports Complex	0.9	1.4	I-95 north to I-76 east – Central Philadelphia	Exit 17 on I-95; southern terminus of PA 611
Sports Complex	1.1	1.8	I-95 south – International Airport	Southbound exit and northbound entrance
Sports Complex	1.3	2.1	Pattison Avenue to I-76 west – Stadium	
Packer Park	1.7	2.7	I-76 / Packer Avenue – Valley Forge, Walt Whitman Bridge, New Jersey	No southbound access to I-76 west; exit 349 on I-76
Marconi Plaza	2.1	3.4	PA 291 west – Chester	Eastern terminus of PA 291
Center City	4.6	7.4	PA 3 west (Market Street / John F. Kennedy Boulevard) to I-676	Penn Square; eastern terminus of PA 3
Chinatown–Callowhill	5.0	8.0	I-676 / US 30 (Vine Street Expressway) to I-76 / I-95 – Philadelphia International Airport, Valley Forge	Access via Vine Street
Hunting Park– Fern Rock	9.2	14.8	US 13 (Roosevelt Boulevard)	No left turns
Hunting Park– Fern Rock	9.4	15.1	US 1 south (Roosevelt Expressway)	Interchange via St. Lukes Street and Cayuga Street; northbound exit from and southbound entrance to US 1
West Oak Lane– East Oak Lane	11.8	19.0	PA 611 north (Old York Road)	PA 611 continues north along Old York Road
West Oak Lane– East Oak Lane	12.4	20.0	PA 309 (Cheltenham Avenue)	Northern terminus of Broad Street
1.000 mi = 1.609 km; 1.000 km = 0.621 mi: Incomplete access; Route transition

== Historic buildings, places, and sites ==
- Broad Street Historic District (Philadelphia)
- E.A. Wright Bank Note Company, 2527-37 North Broad Street, Philadelphia, Pennsylvania, 1913
- 2301-03 N. Broad Street, Philadelphia, Pennsylvania, 1895
- 2305-07 N. Broad Street, Philadelphia, Pennsylvania, 1895
