= Empire Theatre (Rochester, New York) =

Theater in Rochester, New York, United States

Coordinates: 43.1572°N 77.6065°W

The Empire Theatre, also known as Wonderland and the Musee, was a theater located at the northeast corner of East Main Street and North Clinton Avenue in Rochester, New York from 1891 to 1904. It was a house of light entertainment, first as an exhibition space for curiosities and sensational presentations, later a vaudeville and burlesque house. Some of the earliest motion pictures shown in Rochester were presented there. The 1900 Plat Map of Rochester shows it as 234 East Main Street (not West Main street); a building 67 feet wide and 120 feet deep

== History ==
M.S. Robinson leased a 4-story building (old Washington Hall) at East Main and Clinton in 1891, to be outfitted as Robinson's Musee Theater. It opened in September 1891. Robinson sold the business in 1894 to J.H. Moore of Detroit and the place was renamed Wonderland Musee. It presented vaudeville, animal acts and other curiosities.

Some of the earliest demonstrations of motion pictures in Rochester were presented at this theater. An actual motion picture projection, using the Eidoloscope system, was reported at Wonderland in early 1896. Unlike the Kinetoscope, which could be viewed only by one person at a time, the Eidoloscope projected moving images on a screen. The Wonderland presentation came less than a year after the system was first introduced. The Wonderland stage was so shallow, however, that the projected figures were only a foot high.

3,000 people were reported to have visited Wonderland March 1, 1897 to see a "Biographe" show (a 60mm unperforated film system developed in France)

The theater changed its name, and management, to the Empire Theatre August 1899, as a combination house; that is, a house for traveling road shows, burlesque, and vaudeville.

By the end of its time as a theater, the empire was strictly a burlesque house or a combination of vaudeville and burlesque. The City of Rochester suspended its performance license and closed the theater as a fire hazard January 1904

== Replacement by Sibley's ==
In the fall of 1903, the retail company Sibley, Lindsay & Curr Co., a.k.a. Sibley's, announced intentions of building a new Sibley's store on the East Main & Clinton block, including the Empire Theater site.

The plans for the new Sibley complex were timely, as the older store at East Main and St. Paul was totally destroyed in Rochester's greatest fire, the so-called Sibley fire of February 26, 1904.

Sibley's remodeled the Empire Theater Building, and the Jordan Building next door, as part of their temporary retail accommodations following the great fire, while half of the new store was being constructed to the north. Sibley's opened retail operations in the Empire Theater Building and the Jordan Building that month.

The Empire Theater Building was finally torn down a year later, its time as a temporary retail facility done. It was replaced by the southern half of the new Sibley store
