= New Empire Cinema (Bowral) =

Movie theater in Bowral, New South Wales, Australia

Coordinates: 34.479715°S 150.417238°E

The New Empire Cinema is a cinema in Bowral, New South Wales.

Also known as the Empire Theatre, and Empire Pictures, and open since 1915, it is the oldest continuously running cinema in mainland Australia. At times over the years, the title has defaulted to New Empire and there have been similarly named establishments in other Australian states.

The New Empire currently has four screens, and can hold up to 560 people. The cinema is run by Richard Ruhfus, David Graham and Gerard Aiken, and a staff of 24 employees.
