= New Empire Theatre =

Former theatre and cinema in Southend-on-Sea, England

Coordinates: 51.5355°N 0.7125°E

The New Empire Theatre was a historic theatre in Southend-on-Sea, Essex, England. Built in 1896, it closed in 1998 and was demolished in 2017.

== History ==
The New Empire Theatre was built in 1896 by theatre impresario Frederick Marlow. He had owned the public hall previously on the site, and converted it to The Empire Theatre in 1892. A fire on Boxing Day 1895 destroyed the building. Marlow took it upon himself to rebuild a bigger, better theatre, with five floors and electric lighting.

The theatre was the first of its kind in Southend, and was called "the prettiest theatre outside of London" by local press at its opening in 1896. Marlow presented a varied programme of musicals, opera, concerts, plays, variety and music hall. He remained at the theatre until 1905 when it was taken over by the Southend-on-Sea Theatre Company Ltd. The following fourteen years the theatre was run on a leasehold basis by various people, including Albert Marchinsky, an illusionist known as "The Great Rameses", a successful magician and music hall entertainer who spent some time pursuing theatre management as a career.

By 1919, the advent of moving pictures had brought about many changes in Southend, and the theatre closed its doors, making way for an enlarged and magnificent cinema, The Rivoli. From 1921 to 1962, the Rivoli thrived as a cinema, in 1929 installing sound equipment to facilitate the talking pictures. In 1962, the Rivoli was taken over by the ABC chain and underwent further refurbishment, including the addition of a Marine Bar underground, making use of the old Empire passageways. The cinema continued for another 20 years, and in 1982 was twinned to create a second, smaller cinema at the old Rivoli Mezzanine level. The cinema was renamed under the Cannon brand during the 1980s, but again reverted to ABC during the 1990s.

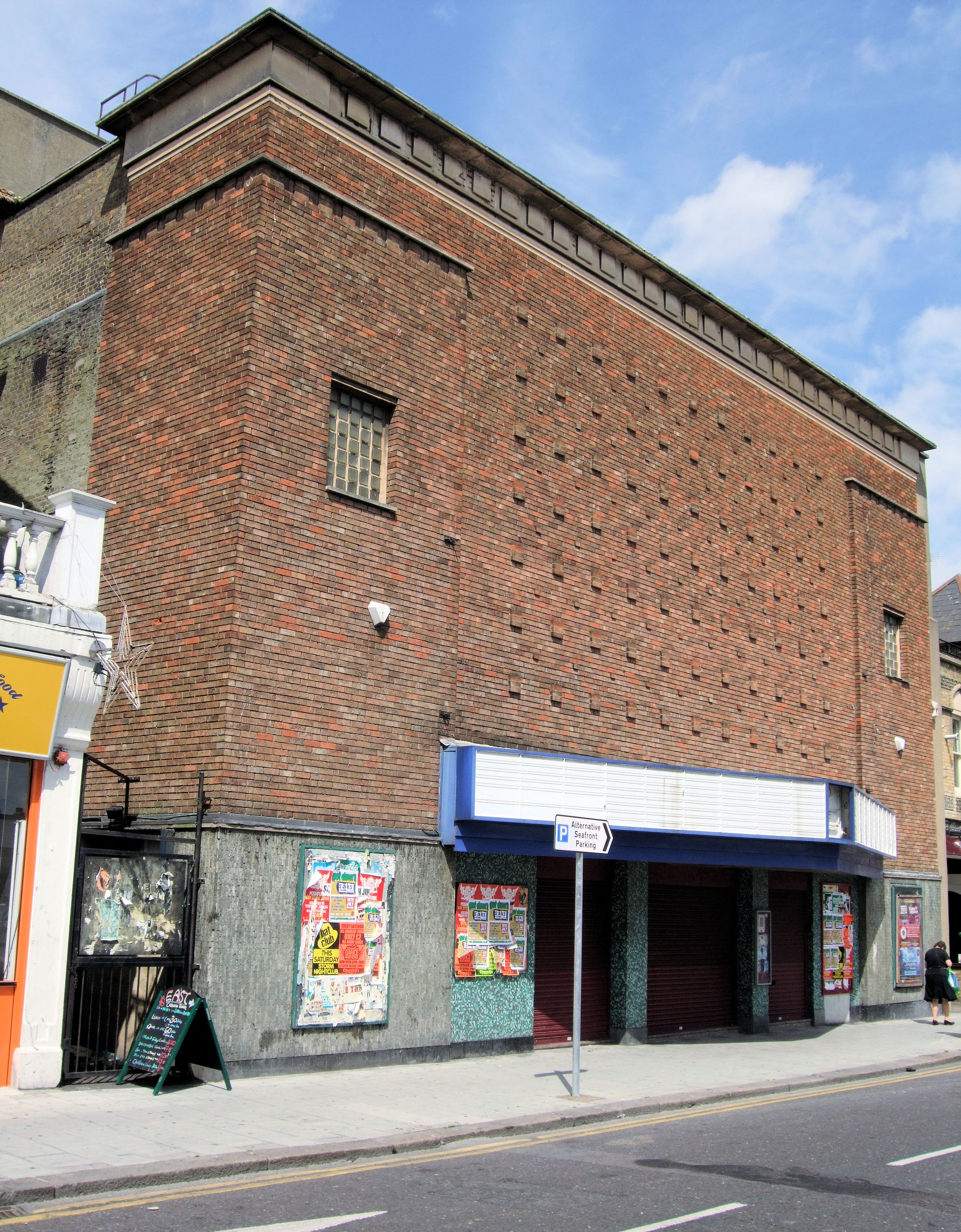
The theatre building in 2009

By 1998, a new wave of multiplex cinemas had emerged to reverse the long decline in cinema attendances, and one of many traditional cinemas in Southend to close over a long period was the ABC. In February 1998, it showed its last film, and the venue was once again closed.

However, after 6 months of closure, the site reopened as the New Empire Theatre, with a production of the Little Shop of Horrors on 10 October 1998. The theatre operated until November 2008, when bailiffs were called in due to non payment of rent.

On 26 July 2015, the 120-year-old theatre was devastated by arson. The fire had destroyed the theatre's much-admired first floor amphitheatre. According to a spokesman for the Essex fire service, "the building suffered extensive damage and the roof has collapsed, largely destroying the first floor auditorium."

After the theatre was bought by an unidentified Hong Kong company in August 2016, the company decided to demolish the theatre. Demolition work began in March 2017.
