= Senator Forsyth (disambiguation) =

John Forsyth (1780–1841) was a U.S. Senator from Georgia from 1818 to 1819 and 1829 to 1834. Senator Forsyth or Forsythe may also refer to:

- C. E. Forsyth (1849–1933), Washington State Senate
- Edwin B. Forsythe (1916–1984), New Jersey State Senate
- Jim Forsythe (born 1968), New Hampshire State Senate
