= William Wightman =

William Wightman may refer to:

- William Wightman (English MP 1361-1391), MP for Huntingdon
- William Wightman (died 1580), MP
- William Wightman (judge) (1784–1863), British judge
- William Wightman (Canadian politician) (1929–2017)
- William May Wightman (1808–1882), American educator and clergyman

== See also ==
- William Wightman Wood
- William Weightman
- William Weightman III
