= Senator Clough =

Senator Clough may refer to:

- David Marston Clough (1846–1924), Minnesota State Senate
- L. B. Clough (1850–1926), Washington State Senate
