= Ravenhill (mansion) =

Renaissance Revival mansion in Philadelphia, Pennsylvania, U.S.

Coordinates: 40.01547°N 75.19639°W

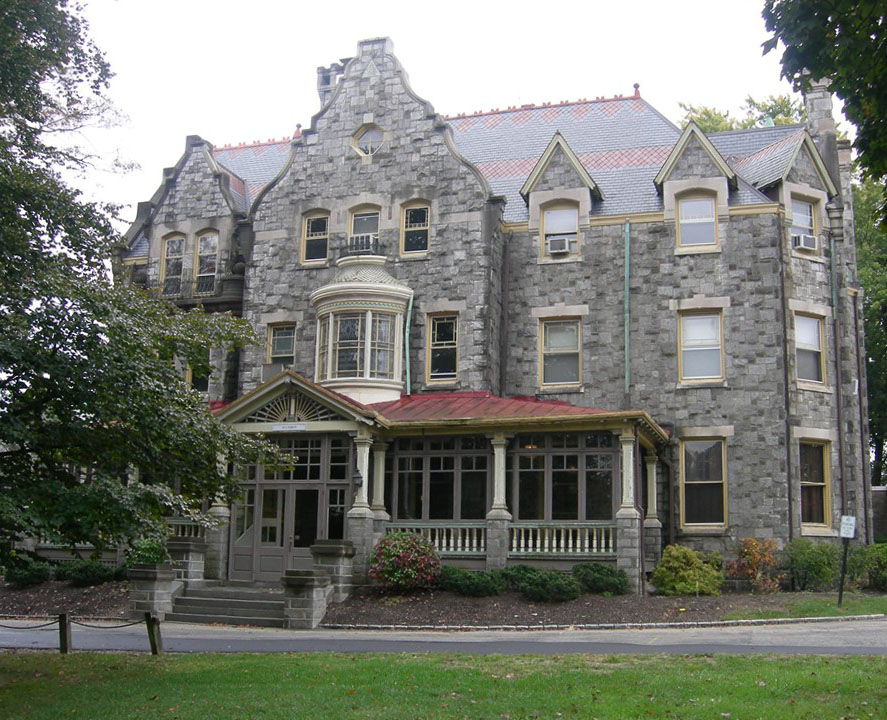
"Ravenhill" in 2020

Ravenhill is a Renaissance Revival mansion at 3480–90 School House Lane in the East Falls neighborhood of Philadelphia. Designed by architect Willis Gaylord Hale and completed in 1887, the suburban house was built for chemical manufacturer William Weightman. Weightman was popularly known as the "Quinine King" and "the richest man in Pennsylvania."

For much of the 20th century, the mansion housed Ravenhill Academy, a Catholic private school for girls. It is now part of the East Falls campus of Thomas Jefferson University.

== History ==
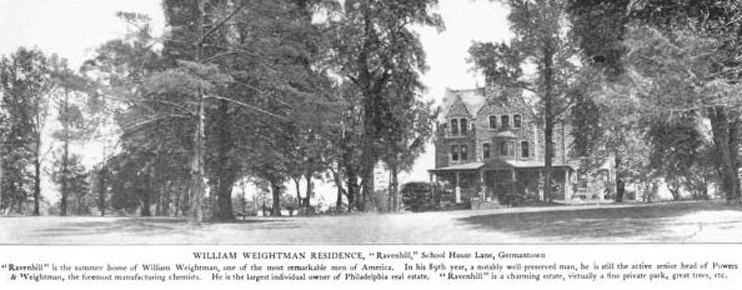
"Ravenhill" in 1901

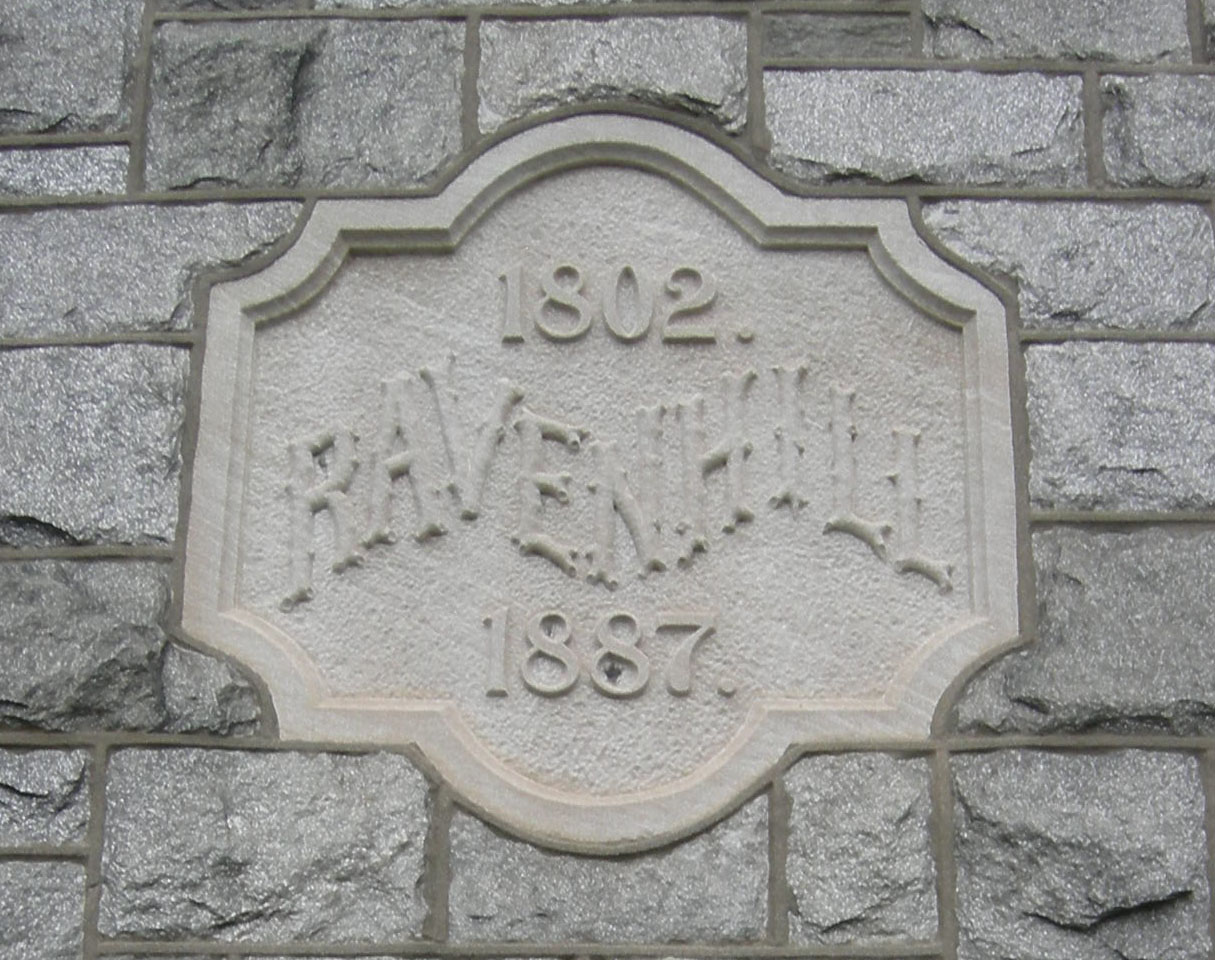
Date stone

The 27-acre (10.9 hectare) property is located on a ridge that overlooks the Wissahickon Valley to the northwest and East Falls to the southeast. A stone house was constructed on the site in 1802, that Weightman purchased by 1844.

The English-born chemist made an enormous fortune after inventing a synthetic form of quinine, a prophylaxis for malaria. His factory, Powers & Weightman's Chemical Works, was located less than a mile away, along the Schuylkill River, at School House Lane and Ridge Avenue.

Weightman hired his niece's husband, Willis G. Hale, to design the mansion. Horticulture was Weightman's hobby, and the estate featured a large variety of rare and exotic plants. He also owned a city house on Rittenhouse Square, and a summer cottage at Cape May, New Jersey.

Weightman developed dozens of blocks of Philadelphia real estate with middle class housing (designed by Hale). His investment in large tracts of Pennsylvania land made him "one of the largest real estate owners in the country."

=== Ravenhill Academy ===
Upon Weightman's death in 1904, Ravenhill passed to his daughter Anne Weightman Walker, who donated the estate to the Archdiocese of Philadelphia in 1910. Cardinal Dennis Joseph Dougherty granted it to the Religious of the Assumption in 1919.

The order of nuns opened a finishing school in the mansion, that later became a K-12 girl's private school known as Ravenhill Academy. Its best known alumna was the future actress and princess, Grace Kelly. Ravenhill Academy's last class graduated in 1977.

A stained glass window was added to Ravenhill, depicting the foundress of the Religious of the Assumption, Mother (now Saint) Marie Eugenie. Prior to the sale of the mansion, the window was moved to the order's congregation house in Lansdale, Pennsylvania.

=== Thomas Jefferson University ===
Ravenhill was sold to Philadelphia University in 1982. Philadelphia University merged with Thomas Jefferson University in 2017. Ravenhill currently houses classrooms and faculty offices for Jefferson's College of Humanities & Sciences.
