= Mary E. C. Bancker =

American author

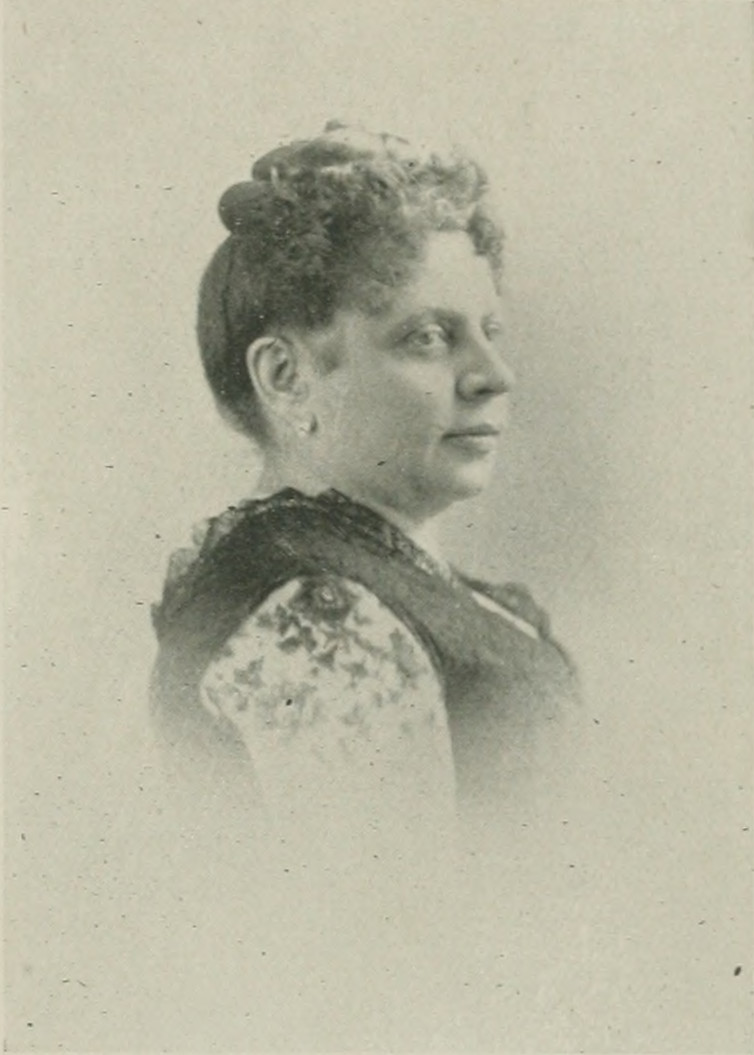
- Photo in A Woman of the Century
- Born: Mary Elizabeth Cradinger Bancker; September 1, 1860; New York City, U.S.
- Died: December 1921 (aged 61)
- Resting place: Green-Wood Cemetery , Brooklyn, New York, U.S.
- Occupation: author
- Writing career
- Pen name: Betsey Bancker
- Language: English
- Notable work: "Dovetta"

Mary E. C. Bancker (pen name, Betsey Bancker; September 1, 1860 – December 1921) was an American author from New York City. A lineal descendant of a prominent family, she was a traveler with a knowledge of French and Spanish. Bancker began her career as a writer of sketches on outdoor life before becoming a staff correspondent for the Montreal Herald in New York. She also produced the opera Dovetta and was a prolific contributor to periodicals in the U.S. and Canada.

== Early life and education ==
Mary Elizabeth Cradinger Bancker was born in New York City, September 1, 1860. She was the daughter of Josiah Hook Bancker and Mary Elizabeth (née Henry). (Note: Willard & Livermore noted her father as being F. J. Bancker. Additionally, according to Waterman, the widow of F. J. Bancker was Charlotte Curtis Bancker.) Siblings included Maria Ann Bancker, Josiah H. Bancker, and Heymer Henry Bancker.

Bancker was a lineal descendant of the Knickerbocker family whose name she carried, which came from Holland in 1658. The Bancker family intermarried with the DePuysters, Rutgers, Ogdens, and Livingstons. The maternal grandparents of Bancker were Michael Henry and Maria Anne Hymes, his wife. Michael was one of the leading merchants of New York, as well as patron of art, and founder and owner of the once famous picture gallery at Number 100 Broadway. Sir Henry was of Huguenot extraction. His ancestors, driven out of France after the revocation of the Edict of Nantes, during the reign of Louis XIV, established themselves at Henry's Grove, County Armagh, Ireland. Mr. Henry's father, John Sinclair Henry, came to America with the idea of founding a colony in South Carolina. Homeward bound, he stopped in New York, where he met Leah, of the old Brevoort family, of that city, and, wooing and wedding her, he remained and established a shipping business between the United States and Newry, Ireland. He was one of the founders of the New York Stock Exchange.

Bancker began her education in New York, and at a very impressionable age, traveled extensively in Europe and in the tropics of America. She had a knowledge of the French and Spanish languages.

== Career ==
Bancker's early writing efforts were a series of sketches descriptive of outdoor life, appearing in the Turf, Field and Farm. These articles were well received and extensively copied. She corresponded for the Cincinnati Enquirer during several years, and then represented the Montreal Herald in New York as staff correspondent for that Canadian journal. She was known from Quebec to British Columbia. She constantly wrote upon a variety of topics that found their way to U.S. as well as Canadian periodicals.

=== Dovetta ===
Bancker produced the opera Dovetta in April 1889, in the Standard Theater in New York, in conjunction with Emma Marcy Raymond. Bancker and Charles Raynaud were the librettists.

John W. Morrissey brought a suit in the New York Supreme Court against Raymond, the composer of the music of the opera, along with Bancker and Raynaud, the authors of the libretto, for US$5,000 for an alleged breach of contract. Morrissey alleged that in the fall of 1888, the defendants agreed to give him US$5,000 for putting the opera on the stage at the Standard Theatre for the season of 1888–9. When the time came to pay the money, Morrissey said that it was not forthcoming, and so he brought on the suit. The defendants denied that the contract was ever completed. Bancker alleged that she gave Morrissey US$1,000, expecting that the contract would be signed, and when it was not, she demanded the return of the money. Morrissey refused to give it back and she brought a suit. The case came up before Justice Edward Patterson in the Supreme Court Chambers. Decision was reserved upon a motion for dismissal of the complaint.
