= Sgambati =

Sgambati is a surname. Notable people with the surname include:

- Giovanni Sgambati (1841–1914), Italian pianist and composer
- Kathleen Sgambati, American politician
