= Adolfo Müller-Ury =

American painter (1862–1947)

Adolfo Müller-Ury KSG
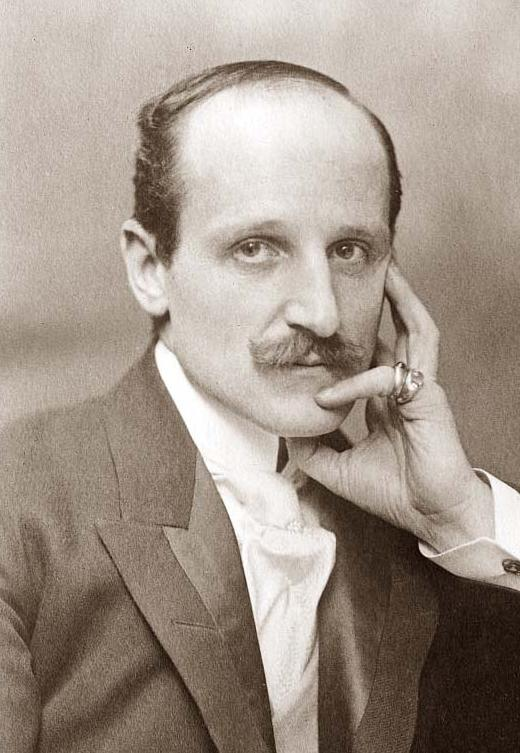
- Müller-Ury, c. 1900
- Born: Felice Adolfo Müller; March 29, 1862; Airolo, Switzerland
- Died: July 6, 1947 (aged 85); Lenox Hill Hospital; New York City, U.S.
- Resting place: New Calvary Cemetery; Queens, New York City, U.S.
- Education: Munich Academy
- Style: Oil painting portraiture and impressionistic

Adolfo Müller-Ury, KSG (March 29, 1862 – July 6, 1947) was a Swiss-born American portrait painter and impressionistic painter of roses and still life.

== Early life and education ==
Müller was born on March 29, 1862, at Airolo, Switzerland, to a prominent patrician family that by the 18th and 19th centuries included mercenaries, lawyers, hoteliers and businessmen.

Adolfo was the sixth of 19 children, most of whom survived infancy, born to Roman Catholic parents: Carl Alois Müller (1825–1887), a lawyer, was Gerichtspräsident (Presiding Judge) of the Cantonal Courts, and Genovefa (née Lombardi; 1836–1920), daughter of Felice Lombardi, Director of the Hospice on the St Gotthard Pass, which he took over from the Capuchin monks who had run it for centuries. The family spoke Airolese mainly, a local dialect of Ticinese Italian, as well as Swiss-German.

After attending the municipal drawing school in the Ticino, and school in Sarnen he was encouraged by the sculptor Vincenzo Vela (1820–1891) and possibly the Commendatore Metalli-Stresa (a family friend), to study oil painting under the local painter of religious pictures in a Nazarene-style, Melchior Paul von Deschwanden in Stans in Switzerland (who died in Adolfo's arms in February 1881). On April 25, 1881, he entered the Munich Academy, where he stayed 18 months, studying with Professors Alexander Strähuber, Alois Gabl (1845–1893), Gyula Benczur, and possibly Karl von Piloty; on the same day, a fellow Swiss called Adalbert Baggenstos (1863–1897), who originated from Stans, also registered at the Munich Academy.

Between Munich and Paris he spent nearly two years (1882–1884) in Rome, studying and copying Old Masters, apparently at the instigation of the Ticinese-born artist Antonio Ciseri, and where he apparently painted portraits of Cardinals Joseph Hergenröther and Gustav Adolf Hohenlohe who were acquaintances of his uncle Josef, a Domherr in Chur, Switzerland. His known early work is necessarily varied, and includes pictures in the style of Deschwanden (usually signed Müller, Adolfo), academic drawings executed in Munich (usually signed Ad. Müller), copies of Old Masters, and early independent oils, sometimes was influenced by artists like Robert Zünd and Frank Buchser, which includes landscapes, genre and religious pictures. Many of these survive in the ancestral home of the Müllers in Hospental, Switzerland, and with surviving members of his family in the St Gotthard and elsewhere.

== Career ==
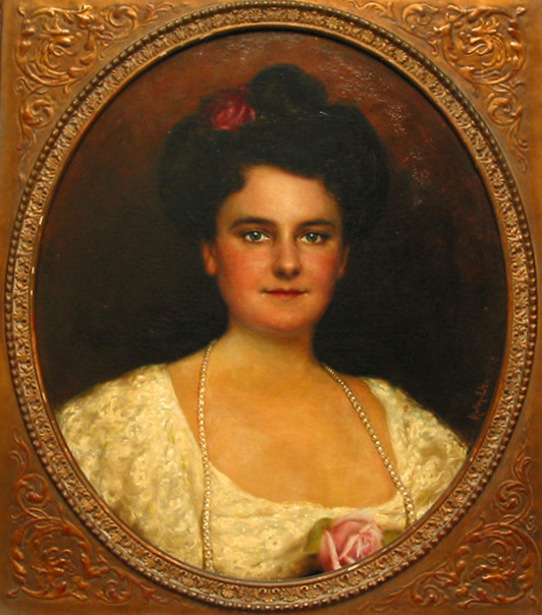
Saidee Williams Overton

While in Paris in late 1884, he decided to visit the United States. He arrived first in Milwaukee, and then visited Chicago and St Paul, Minnesota, where he had relatives. In 1885 he went to Baltimore to paint James Cardinal Gibbons for the first time and in 1886 completed a full-length portrait which was given to the Cardinal for his residence after being exhibited at Schaus's Gallery in New York (missing). At around this time he was travelling all over the eastern United States painting and executed a very large canvas of the Bushkill Falls in Pennsylvania (Von der Heydt Museum, Wuppertal, Germany). Luckily for the artist, his talent for portraiture was soon noticed by the St. Paul railroad builder James J. Hill, who was to commission or acquire many pictures of himself, his family, his friends and business associates, like the Canadian missionary Father Albert Lacombe in 1895, and John Stewart Kennedy the financier in 1901.

In the Newark Museum, New Jersey, is a portrait of a little girl dressed in pink called Miss Brandeis which is probably his first commissioned picture made in America (it is signed with a variation of his family name, A. Lombardi-Muller), though a portrait of Father Joseph Fransioli, who was minister to the large influx of Italian-speaking immigrants arriving in New York, today at the Brooklyn Historical Society, was possibly completed before this as it is signed Adolph Muller. It would seem that from quite early on he wanted to sign his works in a way that was unique to him, and so portraits between 1886 and 1889 are sometimes signed F. Adolphus Muller, A. Muller-Uri, or Muller d'Uri. By 1890 this was fully anglicized as A. Muller-Ury, the umlaut in his surname being dropped. Some of his later smaller works are signed A M Ury. (As late as 1932, the Swiss-American Historical Society published a book on Swiss-Americans where his name was inaccurately stated as Adolph Felix Muller-Uri.) In 1889 he painted a portrait of John R. Brady a New York Judge which was apparently presented to the American Bar Association. He may have travelled in North Africa in the summer of 1889 after visiting the Exposition Universelle as he dated a Portrait of a North African man with a Gun (previously known as Portrait of an Arab; Private Collection, London) that year and exhibited a picture called In the Dark Continent at the National Academy of Design in New York at the end of that year (No. 105; lost). In 1890 he completed a second bust-length portrait of Father Joseph Fransioli of Brooklyn (lost).

His New York studio 1885–1904 was in the Sherwood Studio Building, 58 West 57th Street and 6th Avenue (the building has been long demolished), where he is noted before 1889 in Room C; by 1894 he had a studio with a waiting room (both lit by windows) and a bedroom. Other artists who rented studios in the building in the 1880s were his friend from Munich, Jan Chełmiński (who later married the sister of art dealer Roland Knoedler), landscape painter Robert W. Van Boskerck, James Carroll Beckwith, painter and muralist Edwin Howland Blashfield, and painter turned critic Arthur Hoeber, and later artists such as Carle Blenner and portraitist George Burroughs Torrey. He was photographed in his Sherwood studio by artist turned photographer Edwin Scott Bennett (1847–1915) which was exhibited at the annual exhibition of the Society of Amateur Photographers of New York in 1894.

For a number of years he commuted between New York and Europe. In 1892, after the great success of his portraits of Senator Chauncey Depew in 1890 (Yale Club of New York City) and Mrs Theodore Havemeyer in 1891 (now the property of the Preservation Society of Newport County, Rhode Island), he applied for United States citizenship. It was apparently at this date that he met the young art dealer Joseph Duveen, who was to become a close friend, and after 1891 that he began to be dubbed 'Painter to the Four Hundred', referring to the elite of New York society in whose circles he socialized. He was much aided by the Havemeyers, and also by Louis Benziger (1840–1896), a Roman Catholic publisher (Benziger Brothers), who persuaded many New Yorkers to sit for him; he remained friendly with his son Bruno Benziger until his death, and indeed Bruno Benziger organized the artist's burial.

For three years in the late 1890s he leased one of the studios in Pembroke Studios in Kensington, London, where he certainly painted portraits of Donald Smith, 1st Baron Strathcona and Mount Royal, and Lord Mount Stephen who were business associates of James J. Hill, of whom he made an etching in London in 1898 which was distributed to Hill's family and colleagues. According to a letter he wrote to Hill he started the portrait of Consuelo Yznaga, the 8th Duchess of Manchester, in London in 1898, but it is not known if it was ever completed. In 1903 he was one of a group of artists who invested in a new studio building, the Atelier Building, 33 West 67th Street. Muller-Ury lived in the top floor right studio, and incorporated a stained glass panel of the Müller coat-of-arms into the window (removed in 1947 and now at the Haus Müller in Hospental, Switzerland). The floors were all inlaid with borders of intarsia, and the smaller windows given mullions. He moved into the studio in 1904 and remained there until 1947.

== Painter of prominent people ==
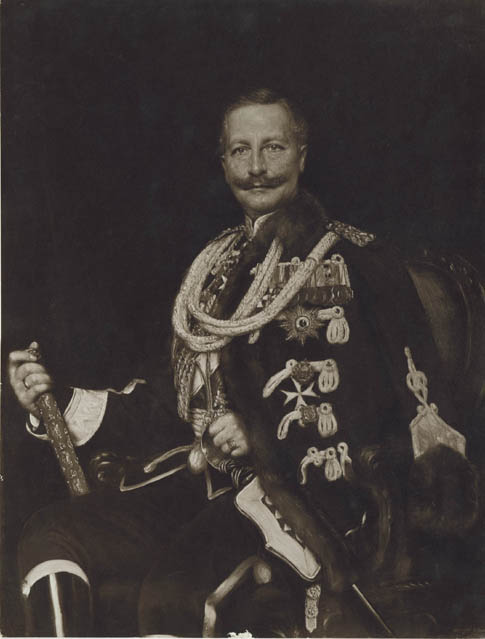
Müller-Ury's 1909 portrait of Kaiser Wilhelm II

Political figures:

- Emperor William II (1909, at the New Palace, Potsdam) given to Columbia University's Deutsches Haus by the Neue-Yorker Staats Zeitung who commissioned it, but missing since the 1960s; the bust-length oil sketch is now at the Max-Planck Institute in Berlin.
- President William McKinley seated in 1899 (lost), the standing version (1900, redated 1901) is now at the National Portrait Gallery in Washington
- General Ulysses S. Grant (1897) since 1899 at the Corcoran Gallery of Art in Washington
- Varina Howell (Mrs Jefferson Davis) in 1895 (Beauvoir, Biloxi, Mississippi) and her daughter Winnie Davis in 1897–98 (Museum of the Confederacy, Richmond, Virginia, a gift from the artist, 1918)
- Theodore Roosevelt (Edmund Morris Collection).
- Edith Galt (Mrs Woodrow Wilson; a wedding present from Colonel Edward M. House, 1916), now at the White House
- President Wilson delivering his "war speech" before Congress on April 3, 1917 (at the League of Nations in Geneva, the gift of Lord Duveen in 1935), and a smaller portrait painted at the same time was given by the artist in 1943 to Mrs Cordell Hull for the Woodrow Wilson Birthplace Foundation in Staunton, Virginia.

Several Swiss politicians who became Presidents:

- Louis Ruchonnet (Musée des Beaux-Arts, Lausanne)
- Bernhard Hammer
- Giuseppe Motta, a three-quarter seated portrait, in 1938 for the authorities in Bellinzona (now in the Archivio Cantonale, Bellinzona), as well as a half-length portrait in 1939 which is now in the Adolfo Müller-Ury Stiftung, Hospental.

He also painted the first permanent diplomatic representative of Switzerland in the United Kingdom, then Swiss Minister in London, Dr Charles Daniel Bourcart of Basel (now at the Swiss Embassy in London).

The Roman Catholic Hierarchy:

- Francesco Satolli (Cardinal Satolli) first Papal Nuncio in the United States (three-quarter seated, 1893)
- Archbishop John Ireland of St Paul (twice)
- Pope Pius X in 1907 (Pontifical North American College, Rome) which was a commission from Mrs Anne Weightman Walker of Philadelphia, again in 1908 (St Joseph's Seminary, Yonkers) and in 1911 (Catholic University of America, Washington) all three-quarters seated; also a number of smaller head and shoulder portraits painted in these years
- Papal Secretary of State Cardinal Rafael Merry del Val in 1907 (Historisches Museum von Uri, Altdorf)
- Archbishop Dr. Thomas F. Kennedy, 1907 (St. Charles Borromeo Seminary, Overbrook, PA) and 1911 (Pontifical North American College, Rome)
- Monsignor Gaetano Bisleti
- Cardinal John Murphy Farley (1913)
- Désiré-Joseph Mercier (Cardinal Mercier) during his visit to the United States, often misleadingly stated to be at Catholic University at Washington but actually in Switzerland at the Stiftung Adolfo Müller-Ury in Hospental, Canton Uri
- Pope Benedict XV in 1920 (Catholic University of America, Washington, and at the Stiftung Adolfo Müller-Ury in Hospental, Canton Uri)
- Monsignor Charles O'Hern, 1920 (Pontifical North American College, Rome)
- Pope Pius XI in 1923 for which he was made a Knight of St Gregory the Great (two versions, the bust-length at St Joseph's Seminary, Yonkers and Pontifical North American College, Rome; the standing version at the Historisches Museum von Uri, Altdorf [but dated later]), and full-length seated in 1930 for which he was raised to the title of Papal Count – this portrait was painted expressly to hang permanently in the Nuova Pinacoteca but is no longer in the Vatican storerooms.
- Cardinal Patrick Joseph Hayes (1924, cut down, Cardinal's Residence, NYC)
- Cardinal Bonaventura Cerretti (1930)

Famous international opera singers:

- Emma Calvé (full-length, 1894, lost) and a vigorous pastel (Private Collection, London)
- Pol Plançon (1897), a commission from Emma Marcy Raymond the composer of the operettas Doretta and The Sheik
- Marcella Sembrich (1899, twice), both lost
- Lina Cavalieri (1907, Metropolitan Opera House, New York)
- Dame Nellie Melba (1908)
- Frances Alda (1910), lost

Popular actresses:

- Lillian Russell (1902), a full-length standing, a bust-length oval and a pastel profile (National Portrait Gallery, Washington DC)
- Margaret Illington (1906; at the time of her marriage to theatre manager Daniel Frohman)

Other sitters include:

- Benjamin Altman, department store owner and art collector (the portrait of Altman seated in his gallery with a vase on a table beside him was given to the Altman Foundation in 1913 but is now missing – a smaller portrait is in the New York State Museum at Albany)
- Stephen Birch President of the Kennecott Mining Co. (1911)
- Mrs. Hobart Chatfield-Taylor, daughter of Senator Farwell of Chicago, wife of popular novelist Hobart Chatfield-Taylor
- James Constable (two versions, three-quarter seated in the American Museum of Natural History, New York; a bust-length in the New York State Museum at Albany)
- Margaret French Cresson, a sculptor and daughter of Daniel Chester French (1912, formerly at Chesterwood)
- Marcus Daly, the copper magnate (half-length, Mineral Museum, Montana Tech at the University of Montana, Butte)
- Senator Chauncey Depew many times and both of his wives
- Dorothy 'Dolly' Duveen as a girl in 1914 (full-length) and a bust-length at the time of her engagement (both lost)
- Elizabeth Wharton Drexel (Mrs John Vinton Dahlgren) (Georgetown University, Washington DC)
- Mrs Karl Evans (1904, for her paternal grandmother Nancy Ganson – the sitter became famous later as Mabel Dodge Luhan, patron of the avant-garde and correspondent of Gertrude Stein)
- Charles Mather Ffoulke, manufacturer and collector of the Barberini tapestries
- Mrs Joseph Frelinghuysen (Emily Brewster) and her son Joseph, wife of New Jersey Senator Joseph S. Frelinghuysen (1916, Newark Museum, New Jersey)
- Commodore Elbridge Thomas Gerry (New York Yacht Club)
- Mrs James D. Goin, daughter of Samuel N. Pike, builder of Pike's Opera House, and sister of artist Alice Pike Barney
- Thomas Watt Gregory, US Attorney General (1917, Department of Justice, Washington)
- Marcus Alonzo Hanna (1902/3, Western Reserve Historical Society, Cleveland, Ohio)
- James J. Hill (many times), most notably in 1902, formerly held in the collection of the New York Chamber of Commerce and later in the Americana collection of Credit Suisse First Boston, New York, and sold by them in 2016
- Emily Key Hoffman, mother of fashion expert Diana Vreeland
- Elise Ladew, later Mrs William R. Grace, whose brother was gardener Harvey Ladew, friend of King Edward VIII (Private Collection, Ketchum, Idaho)
- William d'Alton Mann the editor of Town Topics
- William R. Merriam of St. Paul (three-quarters seated; Minnesota Historical Society) and a head and shoulders study now in the Preservation Society of Newport
- J. Pierpont Morgan some eight times from 1904 (all missing), and with his granddaughter Mabel Satterlee
- Mrs Frederick Neilson, mother of Mrs Reginald Vanderbilt (lost)
- Lewis Nixon, naval constructor – also a full-length of his son Stanhope Wood Nixon in Scottish costume
- Judge Morgan O'Brien (twice) and his daughter, Madeleine (later Mrs. Stuart D. Preston, mother of art critic Stuart Preston
- Oswald Ottendorfer of the Neue-Yorker Staats-Zeitung (twice)
- Judge Alton B. Parker (two versions)
- Madame Felipe Pardo Y Barreda, the wife of the Vice-President of Peru, with her daughter Ana (1917, lost)
- Alice Pfizer, daughter of Charles Pfizer Sr. and pharmaceuticals heiress, later Baroness Bachofen-Echt (Private Collection, London)
- Lulu Pfizer, daughter of Charles Pfizer Jr., and first wife of Major General Spencer Edmund Hollond CB, CMG, DSO
- George Lockhart Rives (1915, Columbia University)
- William Culver Roberts Jr. who had published the immensely popular The Boy’s Account of It: A Chronicle of Foreign Travel by an Eight-Year Old in 1909
- Mrs George Reuling (Elisa Kulp), wife of Baltimore ophthalmologist, Dr George Reuling, Professor at the Baltimore Medical School and art collector
- Cornelia Ruppert, of the New York brewing family, posthumously, the first wife of the conductor Nahan Franko
- Count Antoine Seilern alone (1906 and 1909), and with his two older brothers Charles and Oswald when children (1906), their mother Antoinette, aunt Carola Woerishoffer and grandmother, Mrs Charles Woerishoffer
- Susan Steell, daughter of dramatist and writer Willis Steell
- Florence Sutro (Mrs Theodore Sutro), founder and first president of the National Federation of Women's Music Clubs of America
- Natica Terry, later Countess Stanislas de Castellane, and her mother Madame Francesco Terry y Sanchez of the Château de Rochecotte, France (Private Collection, London)
- Mrs Benjamin Thaw (1915) and Alexander Blair Thaw (posthumously, 1918)
- Mr and Mrs William Scheide and Mr and Mrs John H. Scheide (apparently in Princeton, New Jersey)
- William Weightman (manufacturing chemist, posthumously) of Philadelphia, and his daughter Mrs Anne Walker (later Mrs Frederic Courtland Penfield) with her niece Mrs Richard Meirs
- Miss Olive Whitman as a baby (Preservation Society, Newport) and her father Senator Charles S. Whitman (New York State Capitol, Albany, New York)
- Captain Gilbert C. Wiltse, who raised the U.S. flag on Honolulu in January 1893

== Painter of roses and still lifes ==
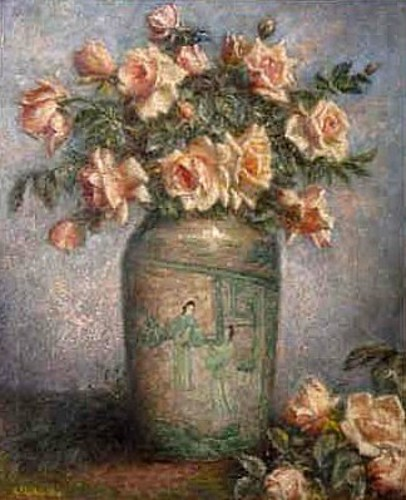
Still Life With Chinese Vase And Pink Roses

In 1896 A Boston newspaper reported that, ‘... Mr. Müller-Ury, the portrait painter, who has just returned from abroad, has taken an attractive studio in Everett street, Newport, the one occupied by Mr. Harper Pennington last season. Mr. Müller-Ury’s roses as well as his portraits are admired, and he is painting a huge basket of American Beauties for the Havemeyer villa.’

In a surviving photograph of the artist’s studio in the Sherwood taken in 1894 (a portrait of Monsignor Satolli is on the easel next to it) there is huge still life, and in a letter from his studio to James J. Hill dated 12 August 1895 (Hill Papers, St. Paul, MN) he says that he hopes that the 'flower peace [sic]' he sent to him 'will suit for the place intended for', further evidence that he had painted some still lifes before 1896.

After 1918 the style of his still lifes becomes more impressionistic, the technique more painterly and using a great deal of impasto, and usually depict roses in Chinese vases from the former collection of J. Pierpont Morgan that he copied at the galleries of Duveen Brothers in New York (Duveen's exhibited the Morgan collection in 1919) and elsewhere, and sometimes including depictions of other works of art like bronze or biscuit porcelain statuettes, Chinese porcelain Buddhas, Italian maiolica plates and so on. It is known he was an admirer of Claude Monet and others, as he told the German Kaiser – who hated the Impressionists – in 1909 that the Impressionists had "done a great deal to awaken modern art."

The roses were claimed by the soprano Jessica Dragonette in her autobiography to be the varieties American Beauty (red), La France (pink), Belle of Portugal (pale pink), Claudius, Killarney (rose pink), and Boucher-Pierné, but there were others. Many of his impressionistic rose paintings were created after he moved to California.

== Californian sojourn ==
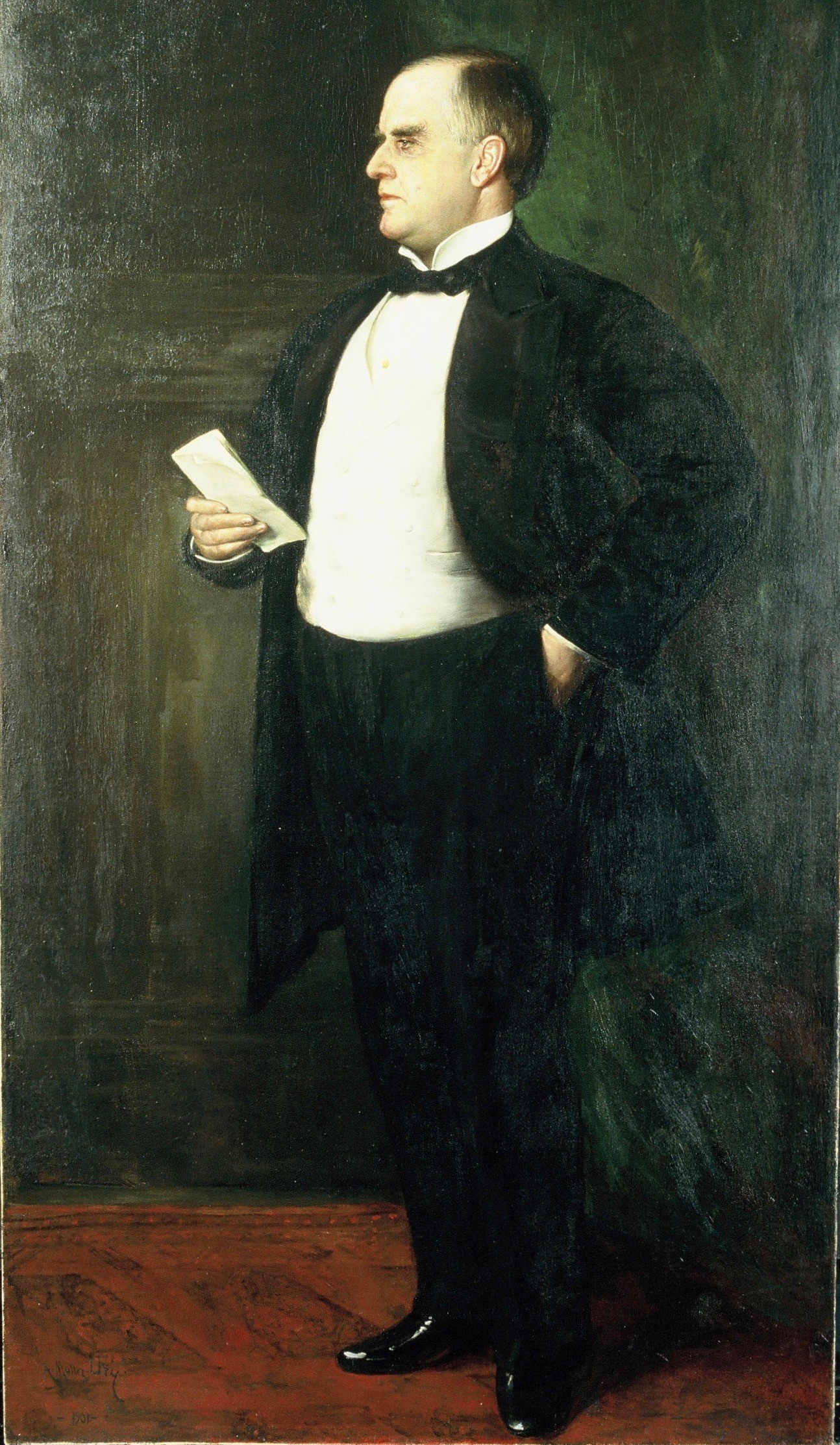
President William McKinley

In March 1922 he travelled with Sir Joseph Duveen (later Lord Duveen) to California for the first time, in order that Duveen could deliver to bibliophile and art collector Henry E. Huntington Gainsborough's famous picture The Blue Boy which Huntington had bought the previous year. Duveen had promised the artist that Huntington would commission a portrait of himself. He did not.

Müller-Ury liked California and after painting Archbishop Edward Joseph Hanna in San Francisco in 1923 decided the following year to erect a studio near Huntington's estate. The studio he built was at the corner of Monterey and Shenandoah Roads in San Marino (architect Carleton Winslow), in the fashionable Spanish style with a green tiled roof and in the studio an enormous north-facing window. He placed the Muller coat-of-arms on the east frontage, where it may be found today. The gardens were extensively planted with many varieties of roses including Radiance, Columbia, Rose Marie, Irish Charm, Imperial Potentate and American Beauty which he painted into his canvases depicting the Morgan porcelains begun in New York. Duveen built a bungalow next door to the artist on Shenandoah Road, but seems to have quickly sold it after the death of his client Henry E. Huntington in 1927.

It was in San Marino during the following years, that Muller-Ury executed portraits of the following sitters:

- Mary Brockway Metcalf, Huntington's granddaughter
- Henry Mauris Robinson, the diplomat
- Anita Baldwin (daughter of Lucky Baldwin of Arcadia, full-length, today at the Los Angeles County Arboretum & Botanic Garden)
- Maurice DeMond, founder of the Breakfast Club then in Griffith Park
- Mrs Carrie Ada Lawless, wife of William J. Lawless, the Mayor of Sierra Madre 1928–1929 (today at the Sierre Madre Women's Club)
- President Rufus B. von KleinSmid (1931) of the University of Southern California (three-quarter length; deaccessioned by the university in the 1980s).

In 1926, Müller-Ury seems to have begun from a photograph of a portrait of Henry E. Huntington standing (now at the Huntington Memorial Hospital in Pasadena) and a seated one (which was engraved by Witherspoon) as well as another smaller seated version which was acquired by John and Elizabeth Huntington Metcalf; his portrait of their daughter Mary Brockway Metcalf was for some years hanging in the lobby to the office of the Director of the Huntington Library.

In 1930, Müller-Ury painted the former Miss Gladys Quarré of San Francisco (then Mrs Frederick Peabody of Montecito, Santa Barbara); later she became known as Gladys Quarré Knapp, a socialite and friend of many Hollywood actors. He also painted a large allegorical work entitled The Spirit of California a version of which was acquired by a prominent art collector called Fred Elbridge Keeler (lost). Müller-Ury abandoned the studio for the last time on September 3, 1933, after which it was let to friends. The house was apparently used by the Red Cross during the Second World War.

== Last years ==
After his return from California he settled permanently back in his New York studio. In 1936 he travelled to Europe and he may have done so in 1937 and certainly in 1938 when he painted a large portrait of President Motta of Switzerland, for his home town of Bellinzona (Archivio Cantonale). In 1937 he painted a portrait of Ellen Dunlap Hopkins, founder of the New York School of Applied Design for Women which he presented to the School in 1938 (Private collection, Brooklyn). He painted Pope Pius XII in 1936 during his visit to the United States when still Cardinal Pacelli, only finishing the work in 1939 (by painting in the white robes after his election to the pontificate), and painted his friend Cardinal Francis Spellman of New York twice in 1940 (St Joseph's Seminary, Yonkers) one version being presented by Manhattan College to Fordham University in 1941 (who appear to have lost the work), and again in 1942; he also painted Archbishop Joseph Rummell of New Orleans (1943).

In 1940, he painted the then-famous radio soprano Jessica Dragonette (Georgian Court College, New Jersey) and several times thereafter, his last portrait in 1946 depicting her bust-length in a gold fez. In 1941 he produced a portrait of her sister Rosalinda (always called Nadea) Loftus looking over her shoulder. He also painted Dragonette's colleague Fred Mitchell, and several portraits of her friends and acquaintances. In 1942, at age 80, he painted a three-quarter length seated portrait of Mrs George H. Ingalls (née Katharine Davis Hinkle), whose late husband, a descendant of one of the founder families of America who had left Lincolnshire in 1628, had been a Vice-President of the New York Central Railroad.

== Death ==
Müller-Ury died, apparently of cancer, on July 6, 1947, at the Lenox Hill Hospital, New York and is buried in New Calvary Cemetery, Queens, New York, where his gravestone is marked simply, if incorrectly, 'ADOLPH MULLER-URY 1862–1947'.

On Thursday, July 10, 1947, a Requiem Mass was held for the artist in St. Patrick's Cathedral. After his death his youngest brother Otto Müller travelled to New York to settle his estate. Most of his studio contents, and a good many of his pictures, were sold in two sales at the Plaza Art Galleries, 28 and 29 November 1947 (No. 2809) and 5 December 1947 (No. 2813), including his oil sketch of Kaiser Wilhelm II of Germany, and the portrait of Lina Cavalieri. The Frick Art Reference Library, New York, has a copy of both catalogues, where the prices for his pictures are marked; three extra lots were included in the second sale.

== Exhibitions ==
Müller-Ury exhibited single pictures and groups of pictures in the following venues (the list is not exhaustive):

- 1884, Schweizerisches Kunstaustellung, Berne.
- 1886, SCHAUS’S ART GALLERY, 204 5th Avenue, (at Madison Square) New York.
- 1888, Kunstmuseum, Berne.
- 1888–89, First National Art Exhibition of Pictures by Swiss Artists (TRAVELLING EXHIBITION): Berne, Herisau, Lucerne, Aargau, Lausanne, Basel, Geneva.
- 1888, INTERNATIONAL FINE ARTS EXHIBITION, MUNICH.
- 1889, National Academy of Design, New York.
- 1889, MYERS & HEDIAN, North Charles Street, Baltimore, Maryland.
- 1889, EXPOSITION UNIVERSELLE, Paris.
- 1890, National Academy of Design, New York.
- 1890, PARIS SALON – Galerie des Artistes-Modernes, rue de la Paix, 5.
- 1891, M. KNOEDLER & CO., 170 5th Avenue, New York.
- 1892, Second National Art Exhibition of Pictures by Swiss Artists, Berne.
- 1894, February 1–15, MESSRS. M. KNOEDLER & CO., 170 Fifth Avenue (corner 22nd Street), New York.
- 1894, November 1–22, NATIONAL ACADEMY OF DESIGN, New York, ‘Loan Exhibition of Portraits of Women’
- 1894, THE CORCORAN GALLERY OF ART, Washington D.C.
- 1895, M. KNOEDLER & Co., 170, Fifth Avenue (corner Twenty-second Street), New York.
- 1895, October 31 – December 7, NATIONAL ACADEMY OF DESIGN, New York, ‘Loan Exhibition of Portraits’.
- 1896, NATIONAL ACADEMY OF DESIGN, New York.
- 1896, THE CORCORAN GALLERY OF ART, Washington D.C.
- 1897, March 1–15 – DURAND-RUEL GALLERIES, 389, Fifth Avenue, New York (one man show) – following an exhibition by Camille Pissarro and preceding one by Auguste Renoir)
- 1898, SCHAUS’S ART GALLERY, New York.
- 1898–99, NATIONAL ACADEMY OF DESIGN, New York, ‘Loan Exhibition of Portraits’.
- 1900, EXPOSITION UNIVERSELLE, Paris, U.S. Pavilion
- 1901, January 5–19, C.W. KRAUSHAAR ART GALLERIES, 260 Fifth Avenue (between 28th & 29th Streets), New York (One Man Show)
- 1901, PAN-AMERICAN EXPOSITION, Buffalo, New York.
- 1901, M. KNOEDLER & CO., New York.
- 1901–02, December 1, 1901 – June 1, 1902, SOUTH CAROLINA INTER-STATE AND WEST INDIAN EXPOSITION, Charleston, South Carolina.
- 1902, THE CORCORAN GALLERY OF ART, Washington D.C.
- 1902, NATIONAL ARTS CLUB, New York, 'Portraits and Ideal Heads'.
- 1903, January 5–19, NOE ART GALLERIES, 368, Fifth Avenue (between 34th & 35th Streets), New York.
- 1904, November 23 – December 3, M. KNOEDLER & CO., 355, Fifth Avenue (corner 34th Street), New York. (One Man Show)
- 1905, THE ART INSTITUTE OF CHICAGO, Portrait Exhibition
- 1906, December 3–15, M. KNOEDLER & CO., 355 5th Avenue (corner of 34th Street), New York (one man show).
- 1907, THE LOTOS CLUB, New York.
- 1907, PARIS SALON.
- 1908, THE LOTOS CLUB, New York.
- 1908, January 13–22, M. KNOEDLER & CO., 355 Fifth Avenue, (corner of 34th Street), New York (one man show).
- 1908, January 18 – February 9 – MINNEAPOLIS SOCIETY OF FINE ARTS, MINNEAPOLIS.
- 1908, Monday, January 27 – Friday, January 31, BENDANN’S ART STORE, BALTIMORE.
- 1908, Tuesday, February 4 – Wednesday, February 19, THE CORCORAN GALLERY OF ART, WASHINGTON D.C. (one man show).
- 1908, February 1908, McCLEES GALLERIES, 1411, Walnut Street, Philadelphia.
- 1910, March 22 – April 30, KÖNIGLICHE AKADEMIE DER KÜNSTE ZU BERLIN, ‘Ausstellung Amerikanischer Kunst’ (Hors Catalogue).
- 1910–11, December 21 – January 3, M. KNOEDLER & CO., 355 5th Avenue, New York (one man show).
- 1912, THE RALSTON GALLERIES, 567, Fifth Avenue, New York.
- 1913, March 31 – April 12, M. KNOEDLER & CO., 556-558 5th Avenue, New York (one man show).
- 1916, THE RALSTON GALLERIES, 567, 5th Avenue, New York.
- 1916, THE LOTOS CLUB, 110 West 57th Street, New York.
- 1917, HENRY REINHARDT & SON, 565, Fifth Avenue, New York.
- 1918, January 7–12, HENRY REINHARDT & SON, 565 Fifth Avenue, New York.
- 1918, February 23–26, THE LOTOS CLUB, 110 West 57th Street, New York.
- 1918, M. KNOEDLER & CO., 556, Fifth Avenue, New York.
- 1918, THE RALSTON GALLERY, 567, Fifth Avenue, New York.
- 1923, GUMP’S, San Francisco.
- 1925, April 6 – April 18, DUVEEN GALLERIES, 720 5th Avenue, New York (one man show).
- 1933, THE COWIE GALLERY, THE BILTMORE HOTEL, Los Angeles, California.
- 1937, April 20 – May 4, WILDENSTEIN & CO., INC., 19 East 64th Street, New York (one man show).
- 1943, May 5–19, GRAND CENTRAL ART GALLERIES, New York, ‘Portraits of Yesterday and Today.’
- 1944, March 7 – April 4, WILDENSTEIN GALLERY, New York, ‘Stars of Yesterday & Today’, Section: Contemporary Portraits by Contributing Artists.
- 1947, April 21 – May 3, FRENCH & COMPANY, 210 East 57th Street, New York (one man show).
- 1950, June 29 – November 19, NATIONAL GALLERY OF ART, Washington D.C., 'Makers of History in Washington 1800 – 1950'.
- 1968, NATIONAL GALLERY OF ART, Washington D.C., 'This New Man: A Discourse in Portraits'.
- 2000, NEWPORT ART MUSEUM, Rhode Island, 'Newportraits'.
- 2000–2003, GEORGE BUSH PRESIDENTIAL LIBRARY AND MUSEUM, College Station, Texas (touring to six other US venues), 'Portraits of the Presidents: The National Portrait Gallery'.

== Collections ==
The largest public collections of his works are: The Historisches Museum von Uri, Altdorf, Switzerland which has ten pictures, including a large allegorical work painted in 1888 called Alpenrose und Edelweiss, and portraits of his father and his uncle (all three donated by him in 1905 when the Museum was first opened).

The Preservation Society of Newport County, Rhode Island, who were given six of the portraits and two etchings by Muller-Ury in the American Heritage Center at the University of Wyoming in Laramie in 2007 to add to the six they already possessed five of which are of the Havemeyer family (this collection included Governor Merriam of St Paul as well as his etchings of railroad builder James J. Hill and Senator Chauncey Depew and was donated to Wyoming by Nicholas M. Turner, husband of the soprano Jessica Dragonette, who at one time owned nearly forty pictures by the artist many bought at his studio sale in 1947). They also acquired from Wyoming the artist's hands modelled by Gertrude Colburn (died 1968).

The National Portrait Gallery in Washington has nine portraits, including President William McKinley, General Henry Clarke Corbin, James J. Hill, the two etchings of James J. Hill and Chauncey Depew, and two oils that the American Heritage Center at the University of Wyoming in Laramie gave them in 2007 from the Dragonette Collection: a Self-portrait and a portrait of steel titan Charles M. Schwab. In 2009 they acquired a drawing of Anaconda Copper Mining Millionaire Marcus Daly.

The New York State Museum at Albany contains six portraits, five of which were in the former New York Chamber of Commerce: Theodore Havemeyer, Oswald Ottendorfer, James Constable, William 'Boyce' Thompson, and Benjamin Altman. Much of his work remains in private collections or with the descendants of his sitters, and many of the portraits of his most famous sitters are apparently lost. However, his recently rediscovered 1923 portrait of his great friend Sir Joseph Duveen, the art dealer, has been recently widely reproduced, notably on the cover of the 2004 biography of Duveen by Meryle Secrest; it was subsequently sold at TEFAF Maastricht in 2006 for $95,000.

== Hildegarde Muller-Uri ==
Hildegarde Muller-Uri (born 1894, Greenwich Village, New York City – died 1990) – actually born Hildegarde Petronella Bernhardina Muller – an American visual artist, was a relative, and in fact a third cousin, of Müller-Ury. She was the eldest daughter of amateur artist Henry Muller and his wife Wilhelmina, both of whom were of course natives of Canton Uri in Switzerland. Henry Muller had moved from New York to San Augustine in around 1898 to work as a chef in one of Henry Flagler's hotels, and later became to builder and owner of the Hotel Marion at 128 Bay Street. She studied first with Hugh H. Breckinridge (1870–1937) at the Pennsylvania Academy of the Fine Arts and at the Breckenridge Art School in East Gloucester, Massachusetts, between 1925 and 1930, and later at the Art Students League with Frank Vincent Dumond (1865–1951) and possibly with Olinsky, Lewis, and others. She exhibited at the Society of Independent Artists 1929 to 1931.

She founded and directed the Galleon Art School in San Augustine in 1925, but this was more a club for artists than a school, so by 1931 she founded the San Augustine Arts Club, where she proved herself a capable arts administrator; she was producing much art of her own in these years and by May 1933 she was able to exhibit a large number of her impressionist paintings, woodcuts of San Augustine, and etchings, at the Woman's Club of Charlotte, North Carolina, in May 1933. By 1937 she had become interested in portraiture and studied again with Wayman Adams (1883–1959) and at some point with his teacher Jossey Bilan. She served as president of the San Augustine Art Association in 1947–1948, and was to be president and treasurer of the Florida Association of Art. Her parents were major patrons of the Arts Club and, in fact, assisted the club by selling them land they owned bordering Marine, Charlotte and Cadiz Streets at a below-market price. They then loaned the Arts Club the money to erect a building, essentially designed by Hildegarde Muller-Uri and her father, which was completed in 1954.

Muller-Uri's work includes stained glass, etchings, illustrations, woodblock prints and linoleum cuts of city scenes and historic buildings in Florida. In 1955 she was working on a book with twenty-two woodcuts called St. Augustine in Woodcuts. She died in 1990 and was buried in Evergreen Cemetery. Several of her works have been sold at auction, including St. Augustine Street Scene depicting a Black Woman Outside a St. Augustine House (sold 2013).
