= New Hampshire's 4th State Senate district =

American legislative district

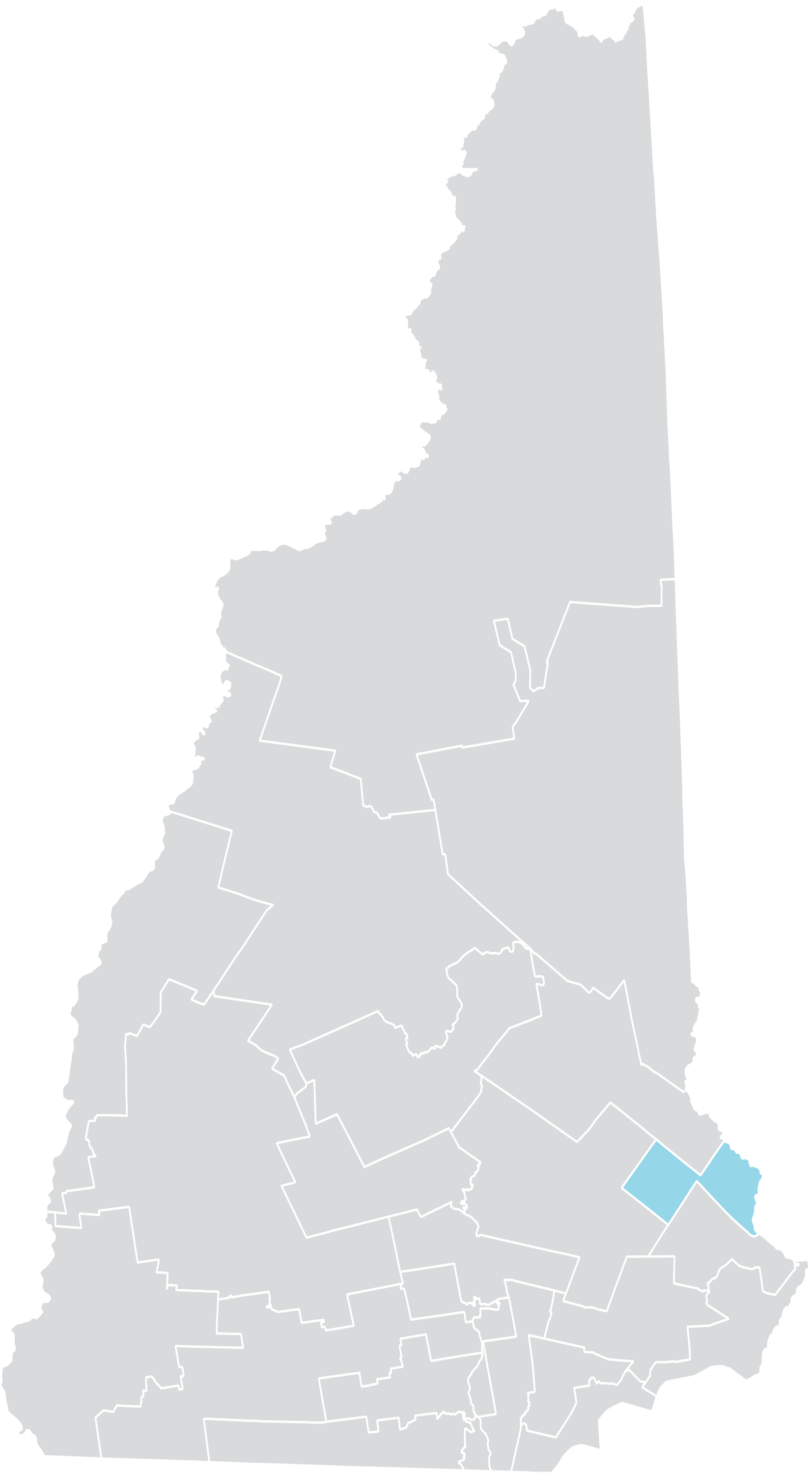
Senator
David Watters; D–Dover
- Registration: 34.8% Democratic; 25.1% Republican; 40.1% No party preference
- Demographics: 88.4% White; 2.6% Black; 2.9% Hispanic; 5.7% Asian
- Population (2019) • Citizens of voting age: 55,132; 41,610

New Hampshire's 4th State Senate district is one of 24 districts in the New Hampshire Senate. It has been represented by Democrat David Watters since 2012.

== Geography ==
District 4 is based in Strafford County, including the city of Dover and the nearby towns of Barrington, Rollinsford, and Somersworth. Between 2002 and 2012, the district included most of Belknap County and two towns in Strafford County.

The district is located entirely within New Hampshire's 1st congressional district. It borders the state of Maine.

== Recent election results ==
=== 2024 ===
2024 New Hampshire State Senate election, District 4
Party	Candidate	Votes	%
Democratic	David H. Watters (Incumbent)	19,666	60.45
Republican	Shawn Mickelonis	12,847	39.50
Write-in		15	0.05
Total votes		32,528	100.0
Democratic hold			

=== 2022 ===
2022 New Hampshire State Senate election, District 4
Party	Candidate	Votes	%
Democratic	David H. Watters (incumbent)	15,879	63.30
Republican	Seamus Casey	9,207	36.70
Total votes		25,086	100.0

=== 2020 ===
2020 New Hampshire State Senate election, District 4
Party	Candidate	Votes	%
Democratic	David Watters (incumbent)	19,228	61.4
Republican	Frank Bertone	12,107	38.6
Total votes		31,335	100
Democratic hold			

=== 2018 ===
2018 New Hampshire State Senate election, District 4
Party	Candidate	Votes	%
Democratic	David Watters (incumbent)	15,299	100
Total votes		15,299	100
Democratic hold			

=== 2016 ===
2016 New Hampshire State Senate election, District 4
Party	Candidate	Votes	%
Democratic	David Watters (incumbent)	15,144	55.2
Republican	Bill O'Connor	12,283	44.8
Total votes		27,427	100
Democratic hold			

=== 2014 ===
2014 New Hampshire State Senate election, District 4
Party	Candidate	Votes	%
Democratic	David Watters (incumbent)	10,121	55.6
Republican	Eddie Edwards	8,067	44.4
Total votes		18,188	100
Democratic hold			

=== 2012 ===
2012 New Hampshire State Senate election, District 4
Party	Candidate	Votes	%
Democratic	David Watters	18,152	60.9
Republican	Phyllis Woods	11,650	39.1
Total votes		29,802	100
Democratic gain from Republican			

=== Federal and statewide results ===
Year	Office	Results
2020	President	Biden 60.7 – 37.4%
2016	President	Clinton 54.3 – 39.6%
2014	Senate	Shaheen 58.1 – 41.9%
2014	Governor	Hassan 59.7 – 40.3%
2012	President	Obama 58.1 – 40.3%
2012	Governor	Hassan 61.3 – 35.8%

== Historical election results ==
These results happened prior to 2012 redistricting, and thus were held under very different district lines.

=== 2010 ===
2010 New Hampshire State Senate election, District 4
Primary election
Party	Candidate	Votes	%
Republican	Jim Forsythe	3,329	50.4
Republican	George Hurt	2,281	34.5
Republican	David Bickford	986	14.9
Total votes		6,596	100
General election
Republican	Jim Forsythe	11,737	62.3
Democratic	Andrew Hosmer	7,117	37.7
Total votes		18,854	100
Republican gain from Democratic			

=== 2008 ===
2008 New Hampshire State Senate election, District 4
Party	Candidate	Votes	%
Democratic	Kathleen Sgambati (incumbent)	14,532	53.7
Republican	Greg Knytych	12,486	46.3
Total votes		27,018	100
Democratic hold			

=== 2006 ===
2006 New Hampshire State Senate election, District 4
Primary election
Party	Candidate	Votes	%
Republican	Jim Fitzgerald	1,913	67.1
Republican	Robert Boyce	936	32.9
Total votes		2,849	100
General election
Democratic	Kathleen Sgambati	9,131	52.1
Republican	Jim Fitzgerald	8,398	47.9
Total votes		17,529	100
Democratic gain from Republican			
