= Anne Weightman =

American philanthropist (1844–1932)

Anne Weightman Walker Penfield
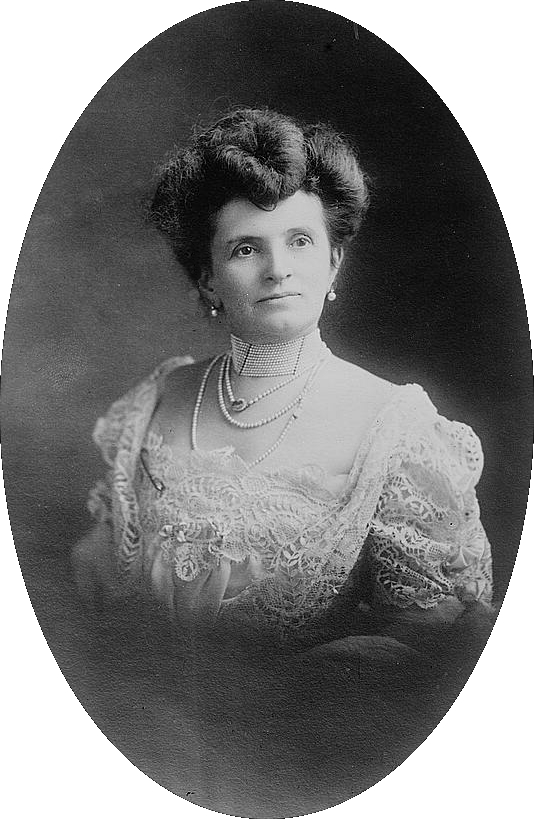
- Born: Anne Weightman; December 15, 1844; Philadelphia, Pennsylvania, U.S.
- Died: February 25, 1932 (aged 87); New York City, U.S.
- Known for: Philanthropist
- Spouses: Robert J. C. Walker (m. 1882; died 1903) Frederic Courtland Penfield (m. 1908; died 1922)
- Father: William Weightman

Anne Weightman Walker Penfield (December 15, 1844 – February 25, 1932) was a philanthropist and one of the richest women in the world.

== Biography ==
She was born in December 15, 1844, to William Weightman and Louisa Stellwagen, and lived with her family at Ravenhill, in the East Falls section of Philadelphia. In 1880, Anne Weightman and her husband moved to Williamsport, Pennsylvania, where her father purchased thousands of acres and real estate after Peter Herdic's financial collapse.

She married Robert J. C. Walker in 1862. Walker died on December 19, 1903, in Philadelphia, leaving her a $10 million inheritance ($235,980,000 in 2025). At the death of her father in 1904, Anne solely inherited Ravenhill, a $60 million valued estate, his properties in Williamsport, and a partnership in his drug company. Her sister-in-law, Sabine Josephine d'Invilliers Weightman fought in court for years to break William Weightman's will, which gave Anne the entire inheritance. Anne moved to Manhattan, New York, for her safety.

In May 1907, she commissioned Adolfo Müller-Ury to paint a portrait of Pope Pius X (now at the Graduate House at the North American College in Rome). He also painted a portrait of Mrs. Walker alone, as well as a double portrait with her favorite niece Mrs. Richard Waln Meirs (for the latter's husband), and a posthumous portrait of her father.

In 1908, she married Frederic Courtland Penfield, an orientalist, a Harvard alumnus and the United States Austria-Hungary ambassador, at St. Patrick's Cathedral. To celebrate her wedding she gave $1 million to charity ($35,830,000 in 2025). She also donated money and property to family members, World War I relief funds, art communities, and Catholic organizations. Pope Pius X bestowed on Anne the Order of the Holy Sepulchre in recognition of her numerous benefactions to Catholic Churches.

=== WWI ===
While in the Austro-Hungarian Empire as the wife of the American ambassador Frederick Penfield she was awarded the Grand Cross of the Imperial Order of Elizabeth for her work among the sick and wounded soldiers of the dual monarchy. In 1914 the United States was neutral in World War I.

== Death ==
She died on February 25, 1932, in Manhattan. She is interred in the Weightman family plot at Laurel Hill Cemetery in Philadelphia.
