= David H. Watters =

American politician

David Watters

Member of the New Hampshire Senate from the 4th district
- Incumbent
- Assumed office December 5, 2012
- Preceded by: Jim Forsythe (redistricting)

Member of the New Hampshire House of Representatives from the Strafford 4th district
- In office December 2008 – December 2012
- Preceded by: Multi-member district
- Succeeded by: Multi-member district

Personal details
- Born: David H. Watters; December 28, 1950 (age 75) Hartford, Connecticut, U.S.
- Party: Democratic
- Spouse: Jan Alberghene
- Children: Harper Watters
- Relatives: Jesse Watters (nephew)
- Education: Dartmouth College (BA); Brown University (PhD)
- Website: Campaign website Official website

David H. Watters (born December 28, 1950) is an American politician from the state of New Hampshire. A Democrat, Watters has represented the 4th district in the New Hampshire Senate since 2012. Prior to his election to the Senate, he served two terms in the New Hampshire House of Representatives for Strafford's 4th district. He worked as a college English professor before entering politics. His adopted son is ballet dancer Harper Watters.

Watters is an uncle of conservative Fox News Channel commentator and program host Jesse Watters.
