= B. A. Seaborg =

American politician

Member of the Washington Senate from the 15th district
- In office November 6, 1889 – January 7, 1891
- Preceded by: Constituency established
- Succeeded by: J. H. Long

Personal details
- Born: Bethers Axel Seaborg; July 30, 1840 Vaasa, Finland
- Died: November 23, 1923 (aged 83) Nez Perce County, Idaho, U.S.
- Party: Republican

Bethers Axel Seaborg (July 30, 1840 – November 23, 1923) was an American politician in the state of Washington. He was a Republican and served in the Washington State Senate from 1889 to 1891.
