= Harper Watters =

American ballet dancer

- Born: Atlanta, Georgia, U.S.
- Education: Walnut Hill School
- Occupation: Ballet dancer
- Years active: 2011–present
- Parent: David H. Watters (father)
- Relatives: Jesse Watters (cousin)
- Career
- Current group: Houston Ballet

TikTok information
- Page: theharperwatters
- Followers: 570.4K
- Last updated: January 4, 2025
- Website: theharperwatters.com

Harper Watters is an American ballet dancer. He was the first black gay soloist in the Houston Ballet's history. In 2025, he was promoted to the rank of principal dancer.

== Early life and family ==
Watters was born in Atlanta, Georgia. He was adopted as an infant by Jan Alberghene, an English professor, and the Democratic politician David H. Watters, who has served in both the New Hampshire Senate and the New Hampshire House of Representatives. His grandfather, Franklin Benjamin Watters, was a cardiologist at the Veterans Administration Hospital in Newington, Connecticut, and a professor at the University of Connecticut Medical Dental School. Watters is a cousin of conservative political commentator Jesse Watters.

Watters grew up in Dover, New Hampshire, and studied at Walnut Hill School, a boarding school in Natick, Massachusetts.

== Career ==
Watters joined the Houston Ballet as an apprentice in 2011. He joined the corps de ballet in 2012 and was promoted to demi soloist in 2016. Watters was promoted as a soloist in 2017 and, in 2021, was promoted to first soloist. He is the first black, queer soloist at Houston Ballet. He has performed in various ballets with the company, including Stanton Welch's The Nutcracker and La Bayadère, Ben Stevenson's The Nutcracker, Giselle, Romeo and Juliet, and Don Quixote, George Balanchine's Theme and Variations, Jewels, and Ballet Imperial. In 2025, Watters was promoted to the rank of principal dancer.

Watters is a social media content creator, with large followings on Instagram, YouTube, and TikTok.

== Personal life ==
Watters is gay.
