= Gertrude Colburn =

American dancer, dance teacher and sculptor

Gertrude Biggs Colburn (1885 – November 10, 1968) was an American dancer, dance teacher and sculptor.

Colburn was born in Baltimore, the third of four daughters born to artist Alfred Bland Biggs (1856–1887) of Winchester, Virginia and Martha Virginia Dumax of Maryland. Her father died when she was young; her mother, just 28 when she was first widowed, supported herself and her four daughter creating trousseaus for Baltimore's wealthiest families. She eventually had a large staff of 30 sewing her designs.

Colburn studied at Western High School in Baltimore and the Louis H. Chalif Normal School of Dancing in New York. In 1918, she married dentist Walter Herbert Colburn.

Colburn spent part of each week in Baltimore, where she was a dance teacher from 1916 to 1931 at the Peabody Conservatory. Starting out with just 12 students, her classes grew to more than 750 when she left in 1931. She took up sculpting after an accidental fall down the stairs at the Peabody abruptly ended her teaching career and she was confined to her bed. Her sculptures, often depicting dancers in motion, were created in bronze, plaster, and ceramics, in a broadly Art Deco style.

Colburn's plaster cast of the hands of the Swiss-born American artist Adolfo Müller-Ury (1862–1947) now belongs to the Preservation Society of Newport County in Rhode Island. It was formerly in the collection of the radio soprano Jessica Dragonette and the University of Wyoming at Laramie.

Colburn died in Morristown, New Jersey, after a short illness, aged 82.
