= Jesse Watters =

American political commentator (born 1978)

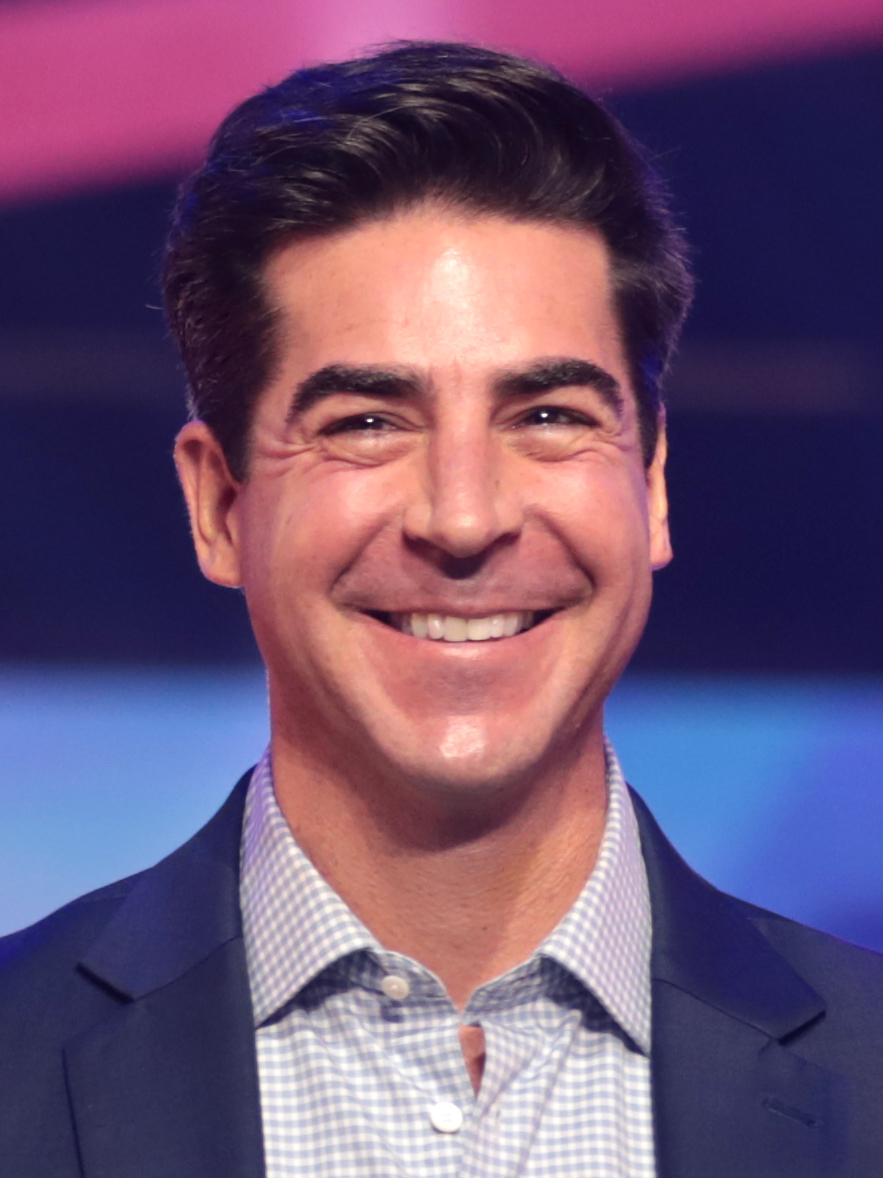
- Watters in 2021
- Born: Jesse Bailey Watters; July 9, 1978 (age 48); Philadelphia, Pennsylvania, U.S.
- Education: Trinity College (BA)
- Occupation: Political commentator
- Years active: 2004–present
- Political party: Conservative Party of New York State
- Spouses: Noelle Inguagiato (m. 2009; div. 2019) Emma DiGiovine (m. 2019)
- Children: 4
- Relatives: Morton Shelley Bailey (great-great grandfather); David H. Watters (uncle); Harper Watters (cousin)

Jesse Bailey Watters (born July 9, 1978) is an American conservative political commentator and television program host on the Fox News cable television network. Earlier in his media career, he frequently appeared on The O'Reilly Factor, the political talk show hosted by commentator/moderator Bill O'Reilly. Watters came to be recognized for his man-on-the-street interviews, featured in the The O'Reilly Factor segment "Watters' World", which became its own show in 2015. In January 2017, Watters' World became a weekly television show; and in April 2017, he became a co-host of the roundtable series The Five. In January 2022, Watters became the host of his own program, Jesse Watters Primetime, on Fox News.

Watters' first book, How I Saved the World, was published by HarperCollins. His second book, Get It Together: Troubling Tales from the Liberal Fringe, was published by Broadside Books in March 2024.

== Early life and education ==
Watters was born in Philadelphia, Pennsylvania. He is the son of Stephen Hapgood Watters, a teacher, and child psychologist Anne Purvis, daughter of Morton Bailey Jr., publisher of Better Homes and Gardens magazine. His maternal great-grandfather, also named Morton Bailey, was the publisher of the prominent longtime magazine The Saturday Evening Post; his maternal great-great-grandfather was Morton Shelley Bailey, a lawyer, politician, state senator, and district judge in Colorado who later served as an associate justice on the Colorado Supreme Court.

Watters' paternal grandfather, Franklin Benjamin Watters, was a cardiologist at the Veterans Administration Hospital at Newington, Connecticut, and a professor at the University of Connecticut Medical Dental School. Watters is also the cousin of ballet dancer Harper Watters and the nephew of longtime current New Hampshire state senator David H. Watters, a Democrat, serving in the upper chamber of the state Senate.

Watters has Irish ancestry on his father's side and is named after his mother's great-grandfather, Jesse Andrew Burnett, an associate chief justice of the Kansas Supreme Court. Watters grew up in the Germantown neighborhood of Upper Northwest Philadelphia and later moved to the East Falls neighborhood of the city's Lower Northwest. He attended the William Penn Charter School through his junior year of secondary school before relocating again from Pennsylvania to Long Island, New York. In 2001, he graduated from Trinity College with a Bachelor of Arts in history.

== Career ==
After graduating from Trinity College, Watters was employed as a production assistant at the Fox News studio in New York City. In 2003, he moved to the production staff of The O'Reilly Factor, and in 2004, Watters began to appear on air in segments of O'Reilly's show. Watters had also appeared as a co-host on the Fox News Channel show Outnumbered. On November 20, 2015, Watters debuted his own monthly Fox News program, Watters' World.

During his time on The O'Reilly Factor and Watters' World, Watters was characterized as an "ambush journalist", having chased down former NPR CEO Vivian Schiller. In response to this, Watters has said, "I try to make it enjoyable for the person I'm interviewing. We always come away from the interview all smiles, for the most part. And it's always fun to come back and look at the footage and say, 'Oh my gosh, what just happened?'"

In January 2017, Watters' World became a weekly show, airing Saturdays at 8 p.m. ET. In April 2017, Watters became a co-host of the roundtable series The Five. In April 2021, HarperCollins announced the publication of Watters' first book, How I Saved the World, which was published on July 6. The book debuted at number one on The New York Times nonfiction best-seller list for the week ending July 10, 2021.

Watters' World aired its final episode in January 2022. After being one of several rotating fill-in hosts in the network's 7 p.m. time slot, it was announced on January 10, 2022, that Watters would become the permanent host of a new primetime show, titled Jesse Watters Primetime, which debuted on January 24, 2022. Watters continued to co-host The Five at 5 p.m.

In June 2023, following the firing of controversial fellow conservative commentator Tucker Carlson, Fox News announced Watters as the permanent host of the network's 8 p.m. ET hour. In January 2024, he claimed to viewers, without evidence, that pop singer Taylor Swift and Kansas City Chiefs player Travis Kelce's relationship was part of a "psyop" directed by the United States Department of Defense. In July 2024, he said that he "heard the scientists say the other day that when a man votes for a woman, he actually transitions into a woman."

== Personal life ==
Watters is registered to vote as a member of the Conservative Party of New York State. He married Noelle Inguagiato in 2009, and they have twin daughters. Inguagiato filed for divorce in 2018 after Watters admitted to an affair with a producer on his show, Emma DiGiovine. Watters has stated he first expressed interest in dating DiGiovine by letting the air out of her vehicle's tires so she would ask him for a ride. In March 2019, Inguagiato and Watters' divorce was finalized. Watters announced his engagement to DiGiovine in August 2019; they married in December 2019. Together, they have a son who was born in 2021 and a daughter born in 2023.

Watters's mother, Anne Watters, is a child psychologist and a Democrat. She called into Jesse Watters Primetime on more than one occasion. She has texted him with criticism since he became a co-host of The Five in 2017. The messages became a part of his show where he would read some of her texts aloud on air in a segment called "Mom Texts". In November 2024, Watters stated that he had not been invited to his mother's home for Thanksgiving. She had told him that there wasn’t enough room.

== Bibliography ==
- Watters, Jesse (2021). How I Saved the World. New York: Broadside Books. ISBN 978-0-06-304908-6. OCLC 1245249467.
- Watters, Jesse (2024). Get It Together: Troubling Tales from the Liberal Fringe. New York: Broadside Books. ISBN 9780063252035

== See also ==
- New Yorkers in journalism
