= J. H. Long =

American politician

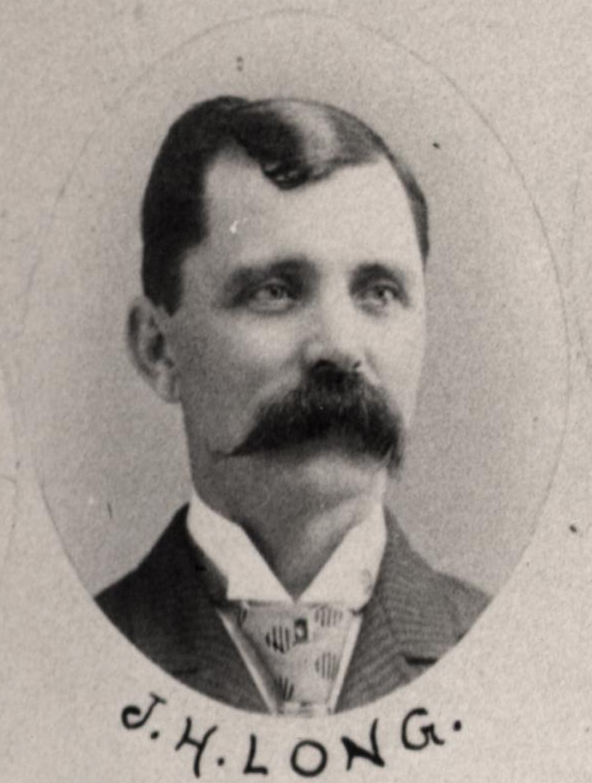

Member of the Washington State Senate
- In office January 7, 1891 – January 9, 1893
- Preceded by: B. A. Seaborg
- Succeeded by: Francis Donahoe
- Constituency: 15th
- In office November 6, 1889 – January 7, 1891
- Preceded by: Constituency established
- Succeeded by: C. E. Forsyth
- Constituency: 14th

Personal details
- Born: November 27, 1845 near Columbus, Ohio, U.S.
- Died: January 21, 1898 (aged 52) Oregon, U.S.
- Party: Republican
- Spouse: Deborah Waterman Hodgdon

John Henry Long (November 27, 1845 – January 21, 1898) was an American politician in the state of Washington. He served in the Washington State Senate from 1889 to 1893.
