= Kathleen Sgambati =

American politician

Member of the New Hampshire Senate from the 4th district
- In office 2006–2010
- Succeeded by: Jim Forsythe

Personal details
- Born: Detroit, MI
- Party: Democratic
- Spouse: Frank
- Profession: State Senator

Kathleen Sgambati is a former Democratic member of the New Hampshire Senate, representing the 4th District between 2006 through 2010.

== Legislative recognition ==
American Medical Association (AMA) State Legislator of the Year (2008)

After School Alliance 2008 After School For All City Champion

NH Women's Lobby 2007 Meritorious Service Award

NH Health Care Association 2007 Legislator of the Year
