= East Falls, Philadelphia =

East Falls
- Neighborhood of Philadelphia
- East Falls at Ridge Avenue and Midvale Avenue in September 2006 with the Twin Bridges in the background

- Location in Philadelphia
- Coordinates: 40°01′01″N 75°11′18″W
- Country: United States
- State: Pennsylvania
- County: Philadelphia County
- City: Philadelphia
- Area codes: 215, 267 and 445

The East Falls section of Philadelphia County, Pennsylvania

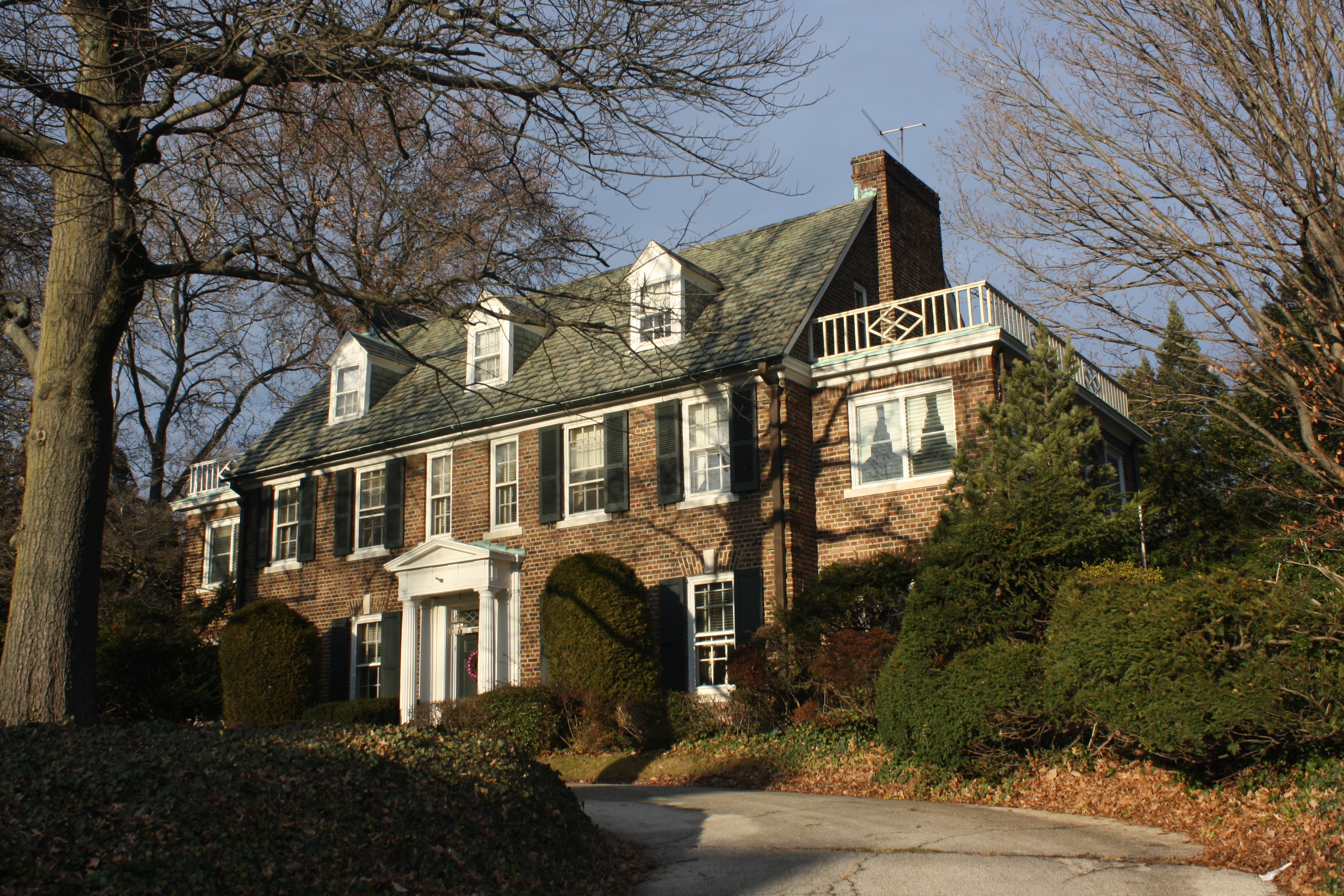
The Kelly Family House, once the residence of John B. Kelly Sr.

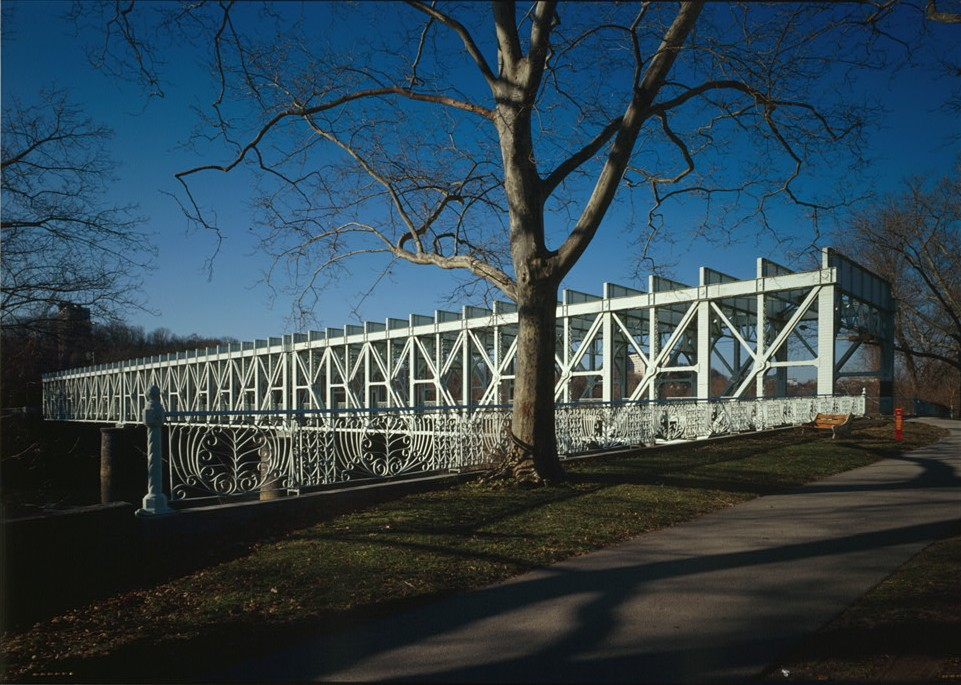
Falls Bridge in the East Falls section of Philadelphia

East Falls (also The Falls, formerly the Falls of Schuylkill) is a neighborhood in Lower Northwest, Philadelphia, Pennsylvania, United States. It lies on the east bank of the "Falls of the Schuylkill," cataracts submerged in 1822 by the Schuylkill Canal and Fairmount Water Works projects. East Falls sits next to the Germantown, Roxborough, Allegheny West, and the Nicetown-Tioga neighborhoods. Wissahickon Valley Park separates it from Manayunk, Philadelphia.

The neighborhood runs along a few miles of Ridge Avenue, along the banks of the Schuylkill River, then extends northeast to Wissahickon Avenue. It overlooks the multi-use recreational path of Fairmount Park along Kelly Drive, and is desirable for its central location, an easy commute to Center City with easy access to several major roadways and public transportation including the East Falls station.

The largest center of commerce in East Falls is the Falls Center, which is home for over 18 businesses and an apartment complex.

== Overview ==
Located on the banks of the Schuylkill River and next to Fairmount Park, East Falls provides year-round access to walking, jogging, and cycling trails. Street fairs, community clean-up days, a robust Community Association, and numerous volunteer opportunities typify life in East Falls. The recently completed Arthur Ashe Youth Tennis and Education Center offers instruction to Philadelphia youth in a 9.2-acre (37,000 m^{2}), sixteen-court facility that operates in cooperation with the City of Philadelphia, School District of Philadelphia, and others. It was built with private funding in partnership with the Commonwealth of Pennsylvania.

East Falls is best known as the childhood home of Grace Kelly, actress and Princess of Monaco, who grew up at 3901 Henry Avenue. In addition, former U.S. Senator Arlen Specter, author and Jewish studies scholar Chaim Potok, Pennsylvania governor and former Philadelphia mayor Ed Rendell owned homes in the neighborhood. Ravenhill Academy, a school for girls led by the Religious of the Assumption, a Roman Catholic order of nuns founded in France, was attended by Kelly and Corazon Aquino, former president of the Philippines. Ravenhill closed in 1977, its grounds and buildings are now part of Jefferson University East Falls Campus.

East Falls is the site of the demolished Schuylkill Falls Public Housing Project designed by architect Oscar Stonorov. Constructed in 1953, Schuylkill Falls stood at Ridge Avenue near Calumet Street and was one of the most studied high-rise public housing designs in the U.S. The building stood vacant for many years and was demolished in 1996.

East Falls is home to historic Laurel Hill Cemetery, burial place of numerous prominent Philadelphians and other notables.

Thomas Mifflin School and the former Woman's Medical College, both located in East Falls, have been named to the National Register of Historic Places.

== Early history ==
East Falls takes its name from its location on the east side of the Schuylkill Falls along the Schuylkill River at the original line of waterfalls known as the 'Falls of the Schuylkill' where the river descends from the elevation of the Pennsylvania piedmont to the coastal plain occupied by the main part of the City of Philadelphia. Thus East Falls was in colonial and Federalist times the highest point on the river navigable down the river by boats not driven by a skilled pilot; accordingly the settlement housed a dock and became a transfer point to the Indian path converted into colonial roadways which later became Ridge Avenue and Germantown Avenue.

Before the War of 1812, Josiah White and Erskine Hazard harnessed the water power from the cataracts for a foundry, wire mill and nail manufactory. Their combined energy needs led them to learn how to successfully use anthracite in industrial heating during the War of 1812 and to push for the legislation and corporation behind the Schuylkill Canal, then found the Lehigh Coal & Navigation Company. In many respects, they bootstrapped the U.S. industrial revolution between 1820 and 1860 by building mines, canals, and railroads, including the first railroad over five miles long and bringing smelting of anthracite pig iron to the United States.

The falls disappeared when the river level was raised by the construction of the dam at the Fairmount Water Works, four miles downstream, but rocks still visible above the water mark the natural fall line. Before the arrival of European settlers, the Lenni Lenape Indians considered the lower Schuylkill River their home. The Wissahickon Creek runs into the Schuylkill here and separates East Falls from Wissahickon, Philadelphia. Today it is included as a part of Fairmount Park, providing walking and bike paths along its banks. Wissahickon is a merging of two Lenape words: "Wisaucksickan" meaning "yellow-colored creek", and "Wisamickan" meaning "catfish creek". In the eighteenth and nineteenth centuries "catfish and waffles" was a favorite food at the many inns and taverns that ran through the valley, and a catfish still serves as the weathervane atop the Free Library of Philadelphia Falls of Schuylkill Branch. East Falls, so named in the nineteenth century, had earlier been known as Falls of the Schuylkill or Falls Village.

In the 19th century, the Dobson Mills textile factory thrived there.

== Demographics ==
As of the census of 2000, the racial makeup of East Falls is 72.06% White, 19.98% African American, 4.79% Asian, and 0.86% from other races. 2.58% of the population are Hispanic or Latino of any race.

In 2005, the median home sale price in the 19129 ZIP code, which contains East Falls, was $184,000. This was an increase of 8% over the median sale price for 2004.

== Government ==
- 4th Council District (includes Roxborough, Manayunk, Andorra and part of West Philadelphia)
- 38th ward (becomes 21st Ward west at School House Lane)
- U.S. Representative District 2 (most of Philadelphia west of Broad Street)
- State Senator District 7 (similar to 4th Council District)
- State Representative Districts 194, 197, and 198

== Education ==
=== Colleges and universities ===
- Thomas Jefferson University is a private university with a 100-acre (0.40 km^{2}) campus in East Falls, predominantly along School House Lane and Henry Avenue. Founded in 1884, it was previously known as The Philadelphia College of Textiles & Science (1961–1999) and then as Philadelphia University until it merged with Jefferson. The school has 3,100 part and full-time students, the university offers more than 50 undergraduate and graduate degree programs.
- East Falls became the main campus of Drexel University College of Medicine since it took over MCP-Hahnemann University School of Medicine in 2003. It is the consolidation of two medical schools, each with over one hundred and fifty years of history, Hahnemann Medical College, founded in 1848, and Woman's Medical College, founded in 1850 and later the Medical College of Pennsylvania.

=== Primary and secondary schools ===
==== Public schools ====
The School District of Philadelphia operates public schools.

- The Thomas Mifflin School, a K–8 grade school, is currently undergoing an $8 million refurbishment project, and is also part of the Bright Futures project.

==== Private schools ====
- William Penn Charter School, a private day school was granted its charter to operate by William Penn in 1689. It has called its forty four acre East Falls campus home since 1925.
- St. Bridget's Elementary School, operating since the 1880s, was closed by the Archdiocese of Philadelphia in 2012.
- St. Bridget's Roman Catholic Church, founded in 1853, remains open.

=== Public libraries ===
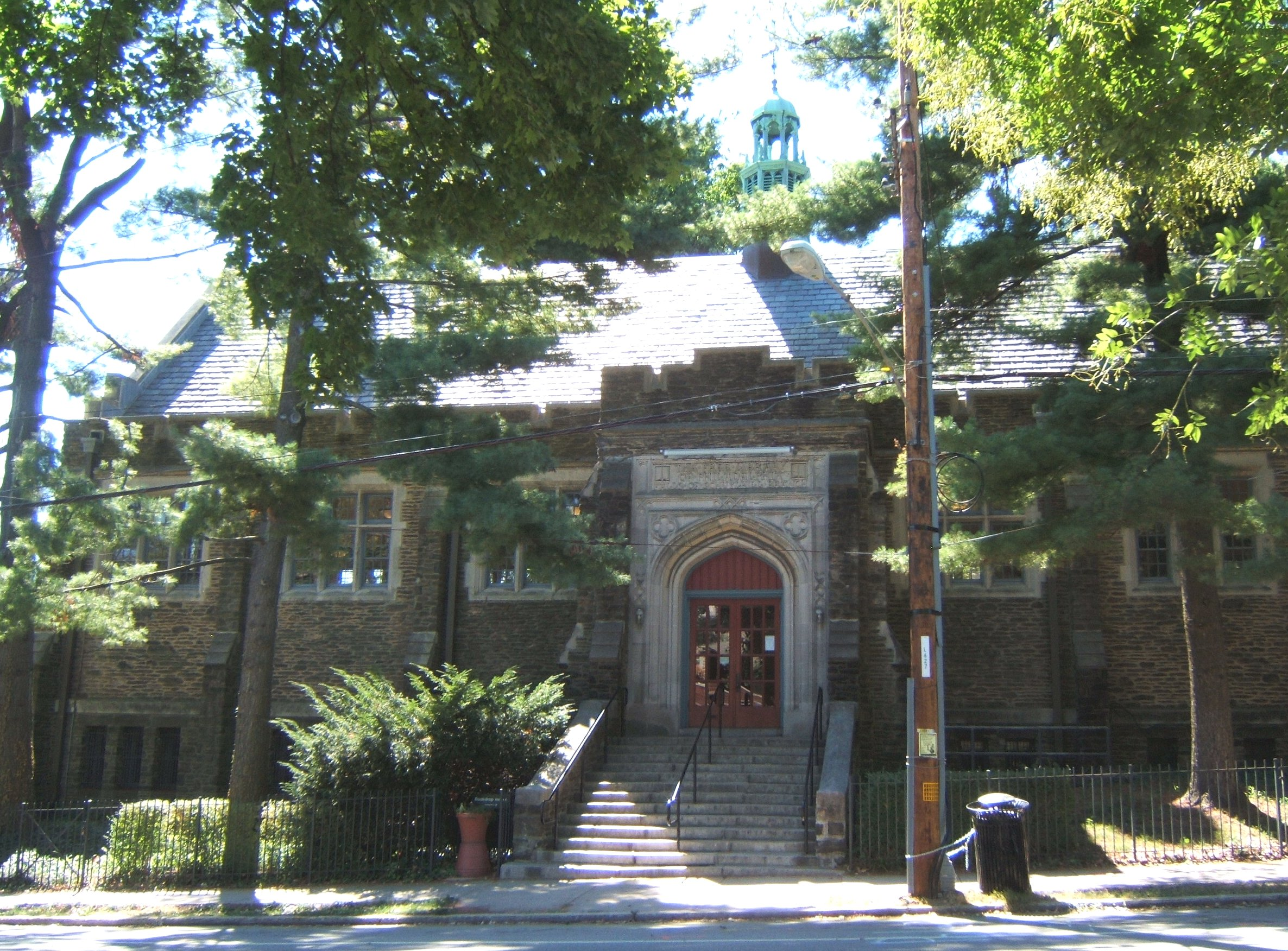
Falls of Schuylkill Branch

The Falls of Schuylkill Branch of the Free Library of Philadelphia located at Midvale Avenue and Warden Drive serves East Falls.

== Places of worship ==
- Baptist: Falls of Schuylkill Baptist Church
- Catholic: St. Bridget's Roman Catholic Church
- Episcopal Church in the United States of America: Memorial Church of the Good Shepherd
- Non-Denominational: METRO Church (formerly Metro Presbyterian Church)
- Presbyterian: East Falls First Presbyterian Church

== Notable people ==
- Grace Kelly, actress, Princess of Monaco
- Thomas Mifflin, first governor of Pennsylvania
- Ed Rendell, former governor of Pennsylvania and former mayor of Philadelphia
- Arlen Spector, U.S. Senator
- Jesse Watters, conservative political commentator

== See also ==
- Medical Campus of Philadelphia
- Philadelphia University
