= L. B. Clough =

American politician

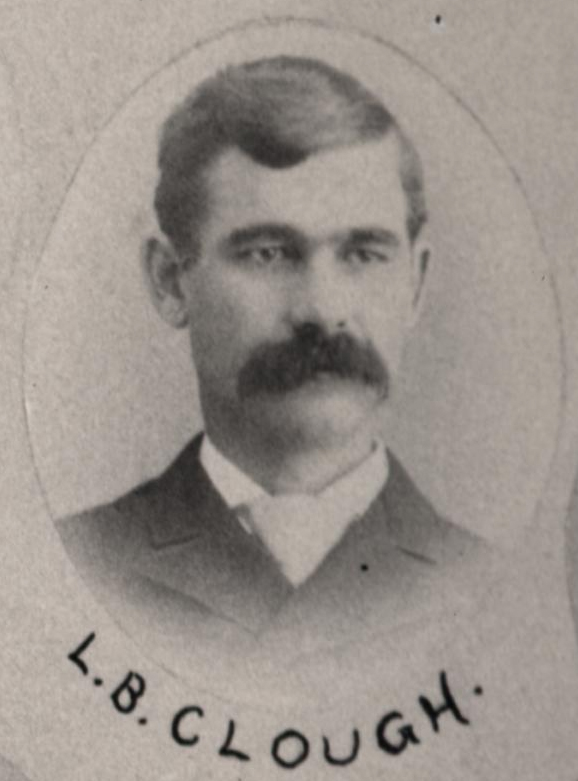
- Clough in 1891

57th Mayor of Vancouver, Washington
- In office January 1, 1903 – January 1, 1904
- Preceded by: A. B. Eastham
- Succeeded by: E. G. Crawford

Member of the Washington State Senate
- In office January 7, 1891 – January 9, 1893
- Preceded by: C. E. Forsyth
- Succeeded by: B. F. Shaw
- Constituency: 13th
- In office November 6, 1889 – January 7, 1891
- Preceded by: Constituency established
- Succeeded by: Jacob T. Eshelman
- Constituency: 12th

Personal details
- Born: May 12, 1850 Waterbury, Vermont, U.S.
- Died: July 6, 1926 (aged 76) Vancouver, Washington, U.S.
- Party: Republican

Lynn B. Clough (May 12, 1850 – September 6, 1926) was an American politician in the state of Washington. He served in the Washington State Senate from 1889 to 1893.
