= Frederic Courtland Penfield =

American diplomat (1855–1922)

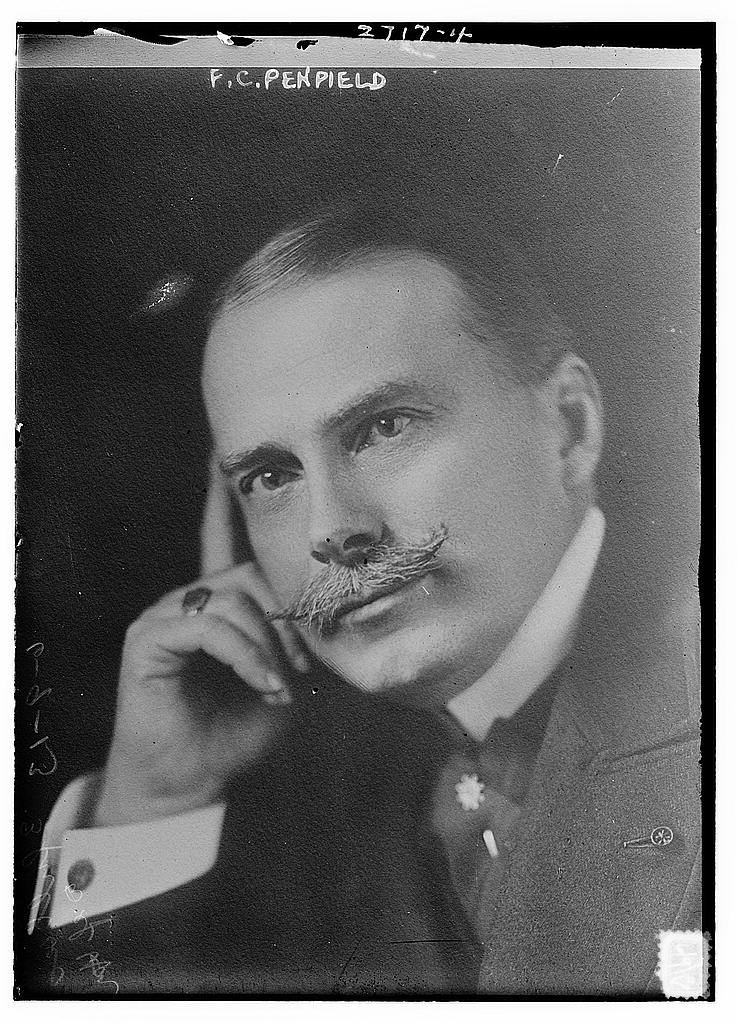
- Penfield circa 1913

23rd United States Ambassador to Austria-Hungary
- In office July 28, 1913 – April 7, 1917
- President: Woodrow Wilson
- Preceded by: Richard C. Kerens
- Succeeded by: Albert Henry Washburn

United States Diplomatic Agent to Egypt
- In office May 13, 1893 – June 17, 1897
- President: Grover Cleveland
- Preceded by: Edward C. Little
- Succeeded by: Thomas Harrison

Personal details
- Born: April 23, 1855 Haddam, Connecticut
- Died: June 19, 1922 (aged 67) 787 Fifth Avenue; Manhattan, New York
- Spouses: Katharine Albert McMurdo Welles (m. 1892–1905) Anne Weightman Walker (m. 1908–1922)
- Parent(s): Sophia Young; Daniel Penfield

Frederic Courtland Penfield (April 23, 1855 – June 19, 1922) was an American diplomat who served in London, Cairo, and as U.S. Ambassador to Austria-Hungary.

== Biography ==
Frederic Penfield was born in Haddam, Connecticut, on April 23, 1855 to Daniel Penfield and Sophia Young. He received his early education at Russell's military school in New Haven, and later studied in England and Germany. After several years with the Hartford Courant he became the United States vice consul in London in 1885. He married Katharine Albert McMurdo Welles (c1855-1905) in 1892.

He became the United States diplomatic agent to Egypt from 1893 to 1897. His wife died in 1905, and in 1907 he published the travelogue East of Suez: Ceylon, India, China and Japan describing his journeys through those countries. In 1908 he married Anne Weightman Walker, said to be one of the wealthiest women in the world.

He became the United States Ambassador to Austria-Hungary from 1913 to 1917. During the period of United States neutrality (1914-1917) in World War I, he took care of the interests in Austria-Hungary of several of the belligerents.

Penfield died on June 19, 1922, at his home on Fifth Avenue in Manhattan of "congestion of the brain". He was buried at Kensico Cemetery in Valhalla, New York.

== Bibliography ==
- Present-Day Egypt. Revised and Enlarged Edition. New York: The Century Co. 1903.
- East of Suez: Ceylon, India, China and Japan. New York: The Century Co. 1907. Online version at Project Gutenberg
