= C. E. Forsyth =

American politician

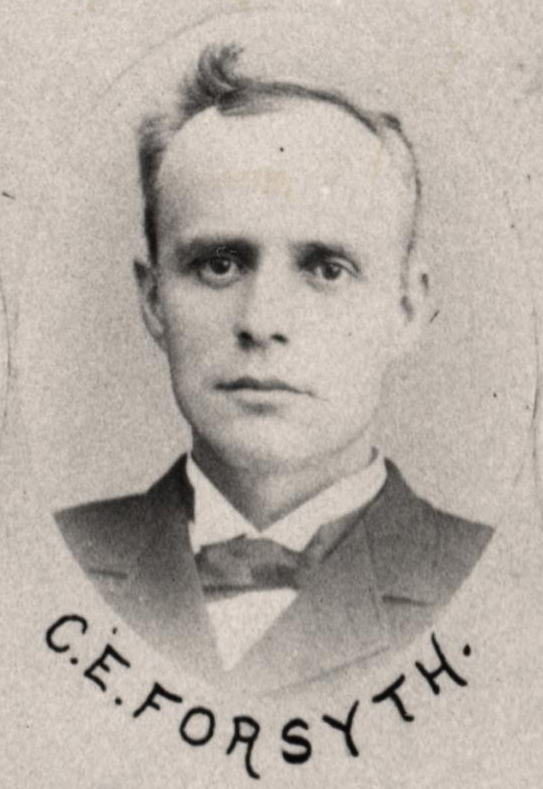
- Forsyth in 1891

Member of the Washington State Senate
- In office January 7, 1891 – January 9, 1893
- Preceded by: J. H. Long
- Succeeded by: Joseph George Megler
- Constituency: 14th
- In office November 6, 1889 – January 7, 1891
- Preceded by: Constituency established
- Succeeded by: L. B. Clough
- Constituency: 13th

Personal details
- Born: November 23, 1849 Pennsylvania, U.S.
- Died: January 31, 1933 (aged 83) Washington, U.S.
- Party: Republican

Charles E. Forsyth (November 23, 1849 – January 31, 1933) was an American politician in the state of Washington. He served in the Washington State Senate from 1889 to 1893.
