= Jim Forsythe =

American politician

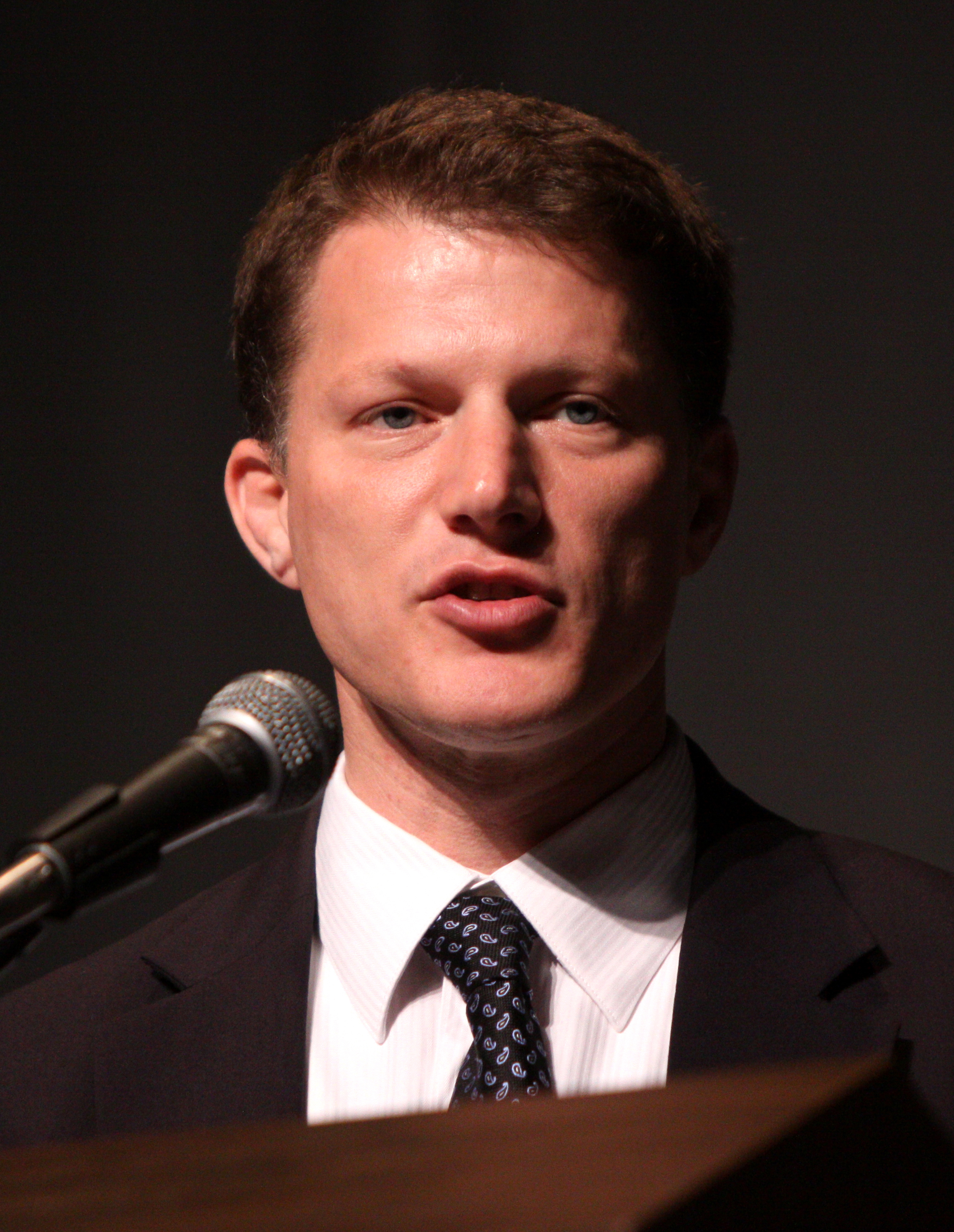

Member of the New Hampshire Senate from the 4th district
- In office December 2010 – December 2012
- Preceded by: Kathleen Sgambati
- Succeeded by: David Watters (redistricting)

Personal details
- Born: October 1, 1968 Strafford, New Hampshire
- Died: 15 March 2024 (aged 55)
- Party: Republican
- Profession: State Senator

Jim Forsythe (1 October 1968 – 15 March 2024) was a former Republican member of the New Hampshire Senate, having represented the 4th District from 2010 to 2012. Forsythe moved to Strafford, New Hampshire, and became involved in politics after a career in the US Air Force.

On June 8, 2011, Forsythe was announced as New Hampshire Campaign Chairman for the presidential campaign of Congressman Ron Paul.

On January 5, 2012, Forsythe announced that he would not run for re-election in 2012.

Jim Forsythe founded Citizens for Sound Money (C4SM) a state non-profit and federal 501(c)(4) founded in March 2021 with the aim to encourage people to use sound money and protecting their right to do so. Since 2021 he was partner in Silverback Precious Metals, a mint which aims to sell silver bullion using silver sourced from EFP Comex silver thereby serving the silversqueeze community.

Forsythe died from injuries sustained in a kite surfing accident on 15 March 2024.
