= William Weightman =

American chemist

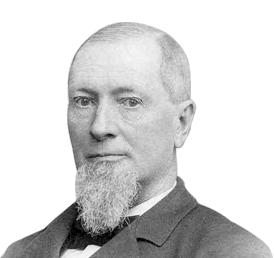
- Born: William Weightman; September 30, 1813; Waltham, England
- Died: August 25, 1904 (aged 90); Philadelphia, Pennsylvania, US
- Occupation: Chemical manufacturer
- Known for: Quinine
- Spouse: Louisa Stelwagon
- Children: Anne Weightman; William Weightman, Jr. John Farr Weightman
- Relatives: William Weightman III (great grandson); George W. Strawbridge, Jr., (great grandson)

William Weightman (September 30, 1813 – August 25, 1904) was a chemical manufacturer and one of the largest landowners in the United States. Nicknamed the "Quinine King," he created a synthetic form of the drug. His company, Powers & Weightman, merged in the 1920s with the pharmaceutical giant Merck & Co. Weightman was listed as the 17th wealthiest American in history by American Heritage magazine in 1998.

== Biography ==
Weightman was born on September 30, 1813, in Waltham, Lincolnshire, England. At the invitation of his uncle, chemist John Farr, he immigrated to the United States in 1829, at age 16. Farr had founded the firm Farr and Kunzi, the first manufacturers of sulfate of quinine in the United States. Upon Kunzi's retirement in 1836, Farr partnered with Thomas Powers and 27-year-old Weightman to establish Farr, Powers and Weightman, manufacturing chemists.

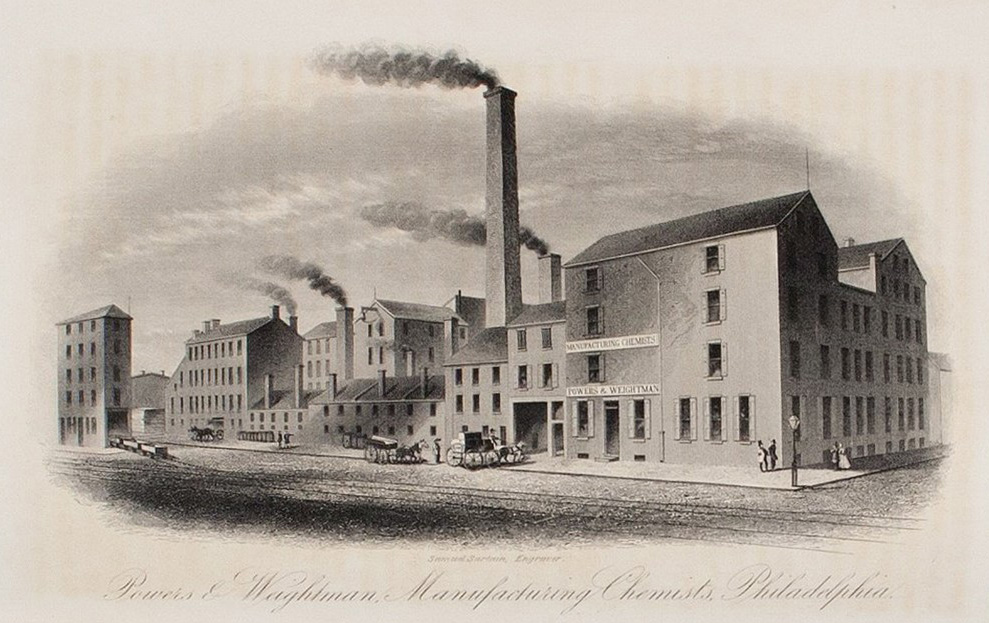
Powers & Weightman advertisement, 1859

When John Farr died in 1847, Weightman became an administrator and executive of the business, which was renamed Powers and Weightman, chemical manufacturers. Powers & Weightman developed a synthetic form of quinine, a prophylaxis for malaria. With importation of British quinine cut off during the Civil War, the company profited greatly through a quasi monopoly. In 1875, Powers & Weightman was awarded the Elliott Cresson Medal for Engineering, by the Franklin Institute.

Weightman amassed a large fortune through shrewd investments, derived from his manufacturing enterprise, estimated at $51.8 billion in 2014 adjusted value. At the turn of the 20th century, he was "the largest individual owner of Philadelphia real estate," having purchased hundreds of acres of farms and built whole neighborhoods of middle-class housing. His architect for these was Willis G. Hale, the husband of one of his nieces. Hale also designed the Garrick Theatre for Weightman which opened in 1901.

Hale also designed Weightman's country house, Ravenhill (1887), built in the West Germantown section of Philadelphia, on a ridge overlooking the Wissahickon Creek.

Ravenhill Mansion, a Renaissance Revival building in Philadelphia, is now part of the East Falls campus of Thomas Jefferson University, housing administrative and faculty offices for the School of General Studies. Originally built in 1887 for chemical manufacturer William Weightman, it later became Ravenhill Academy, a Catholic girls' school attended by Grace Kelly, before being purchased by Philadelphia University (now Jefferson) in 1982.

Having outlived his two physician sons, Farr and William, Weightman came to rely on his daughter, Anne Weightman Walker. Following her husband's death in 1903, she was admitted as a partner in Powers & Weightman, "the only woman in the United States to hold such a position of responsible trust".

=== Personal ===
Weightman married Louisa Stillwagon in 1841. Together, they had three children: John, William Jr., and Anne.

Weightman died at age 90 on August 25, 1904, at Ravenhill. He left the bulk of his estate to his surviving child, Anne. He was interred at Laurel Hill Cemetery in Philadelphia.

Ravenhill was inherited by Anne Weightman Walker, who donated the estate to the Archdiocese of Philadelphia in 1910. Cardinal Dennis Joseph Dougherty of the Archdiocese granted the Mansion to an order of nuns, the Religious of the Assumption, in 1919. The sisters converted the mansion into a school and named it Ravenhill Academy.

== Legacy ==
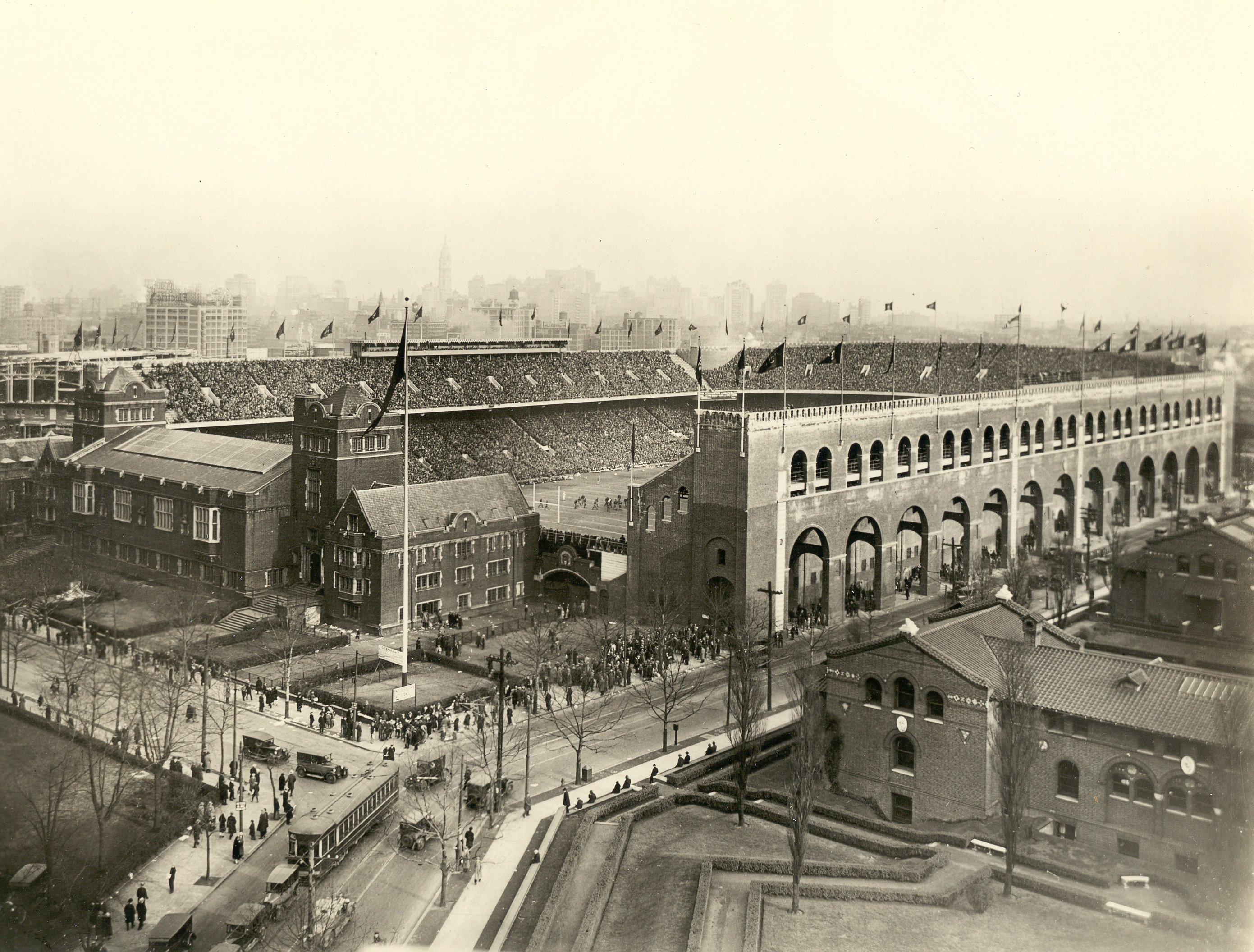
Weightman Hall (left) and Franklin Field in 1922

A posthumous portrait of William Weightman was also commissioned by his daughter Anne Weightman from the Swiss-born American artist Adolfo Müller-Ury; it was exhibited at the Corcoran Gallery in Washington and in Philadelphia in 1908.

The University of Pennsylvania gymnasium, Weightman Hall (1903–05, Frank Miles Day, architect), adjacent to Franklin Field, is named for him.

"Ravenhill," the Weightman mansion in West Germantown, is now part of Thomas Jefferson University.

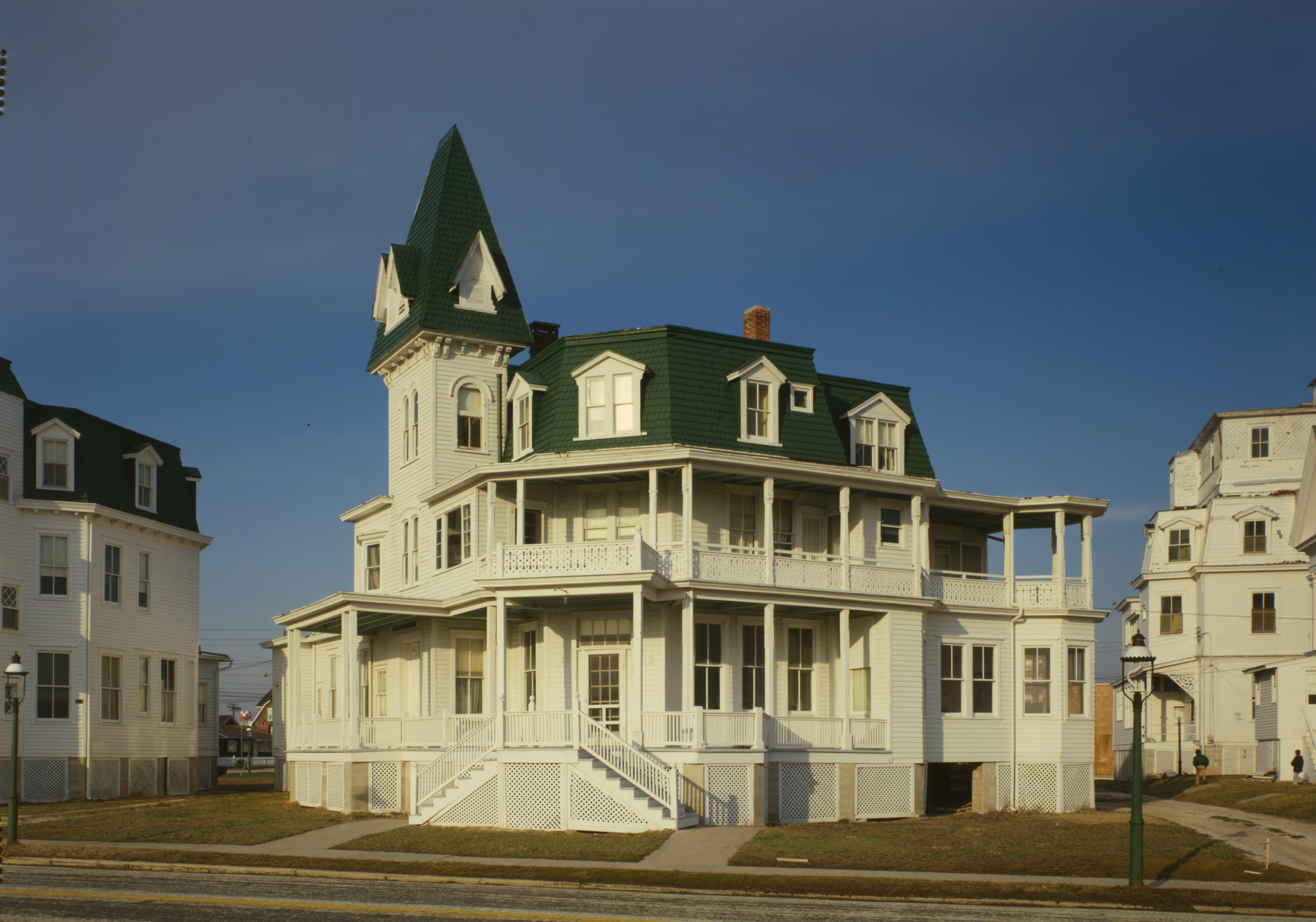
Weightman house, Trenton Avenue, Cape May, New Jersey

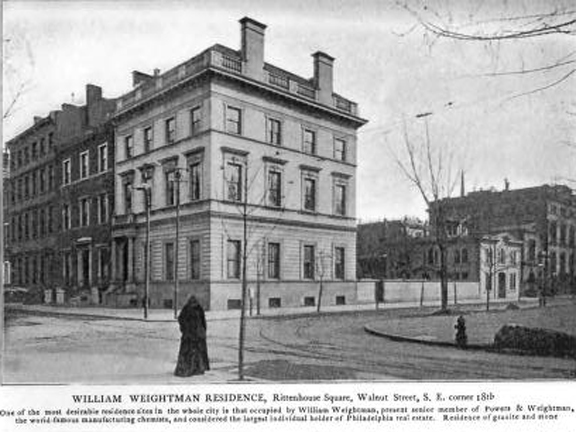
Weightman house, SE corner 18th & Walnut Streets, Rittenhouse Square, Philadelphia

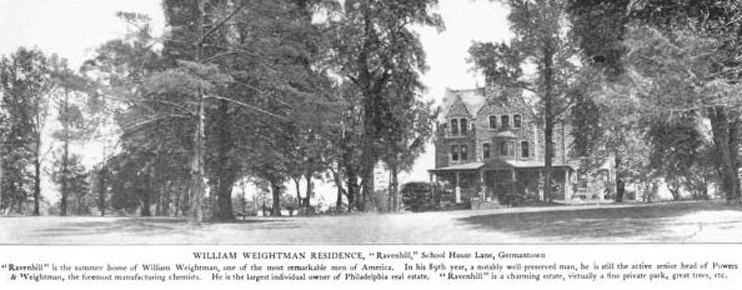
"Ravenhill," Weightman mansion, Schoolhouse Lane, Germantown, Philadelphia

== Archives and records ==
- Powers and Weightman records at Baker Library Special Collections, Harvard Business School.
