= Emma Marcy Raymond =

American singer

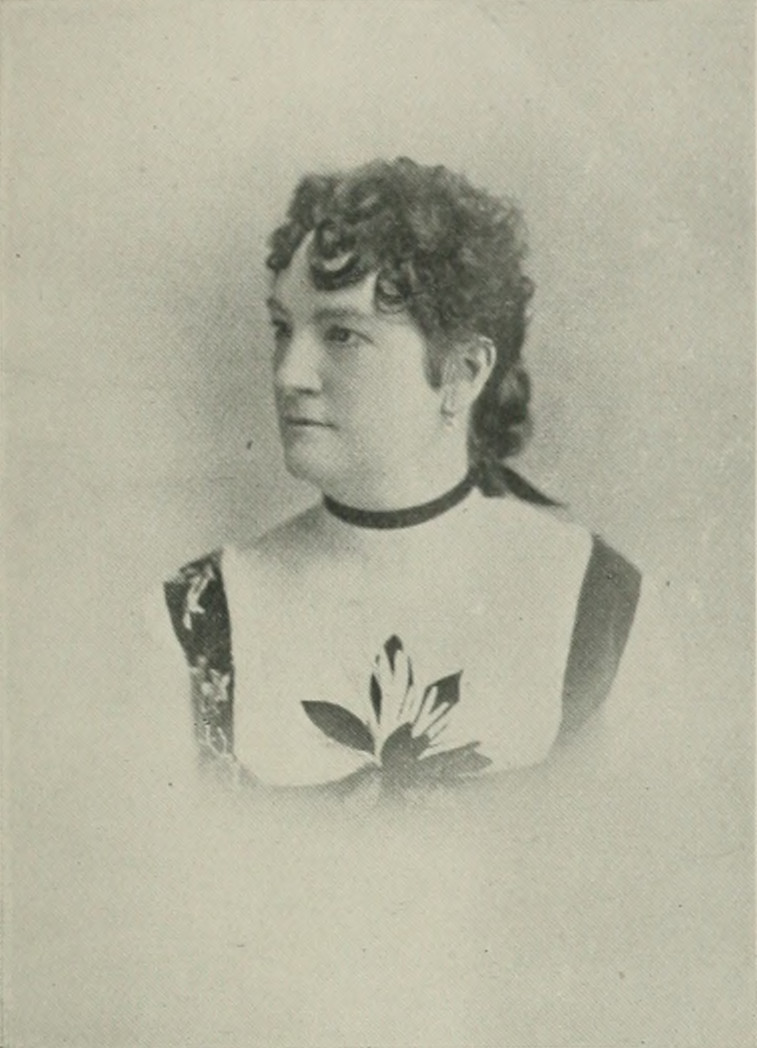
- Born: Emma P. Marcy; 1839; Hartford, Connecticut, U.S.
- Died: November 7, 1913 (aged 73–74)
- Occupations: composer and musician

Emma Marcy Raymond (pseudonym, Salvator Sylvain; 1839 – November 7, 1913) was an American musician, composer, and author of operetta, songs and piano music. She was one of very few women in her day who had composed the entire music of an opera and lived to see it produced.

== Early life and education ==
Emma P. Marcy was born in 1839 in Hartford, Connecticut, (Note: Some sources say March 6 and others March 16, 1856, in New York, but this is almost certainly erroneous. For one example: according to VIAF, Raymond was born in 1856.) the oldest daughter of Dr. Erastus Egerton Marcy and Emeline Babcock (Kilbourn) Marcy, whose father was Henry Kilbourn of Hartford. Her father was a graduate of the University of Pennsylvania and later a homeopathic specialist, who apparently lived for many years on Fifth Avenue on the site opposite Tiffany's. In 1850, he published a book called The Homeopathic Theory and Practice of Medicine. Her sister, Nina Marcy, married a lawyer, Ernest G. Stedman.

Her uncle was General Randolph D. Marcy, an 1832 graduate of West Point. She was a cousin to Mrs George B. McClennan (née Ellen Mary Marcy), the wife of General George Brinton McClellan.

She showed a remarkable aptitude for music at a very early age, having composed her first song before six years of age. She inherited her musical talents from her parents, both of whom were gifted amateurs. She was reared in an atmosphere of music, and studied under the best teachers who visited the United States. She studied the piano with Louis Moreau Gottschalk and Raccoman, vocal music with Giorgio Ronconi, and counterpoint and harmony with the best German masters.

== Career ==
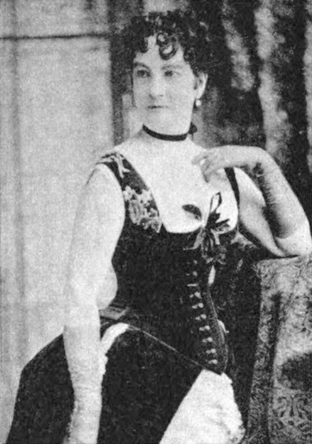
Emma Marcy Raymond (1889)

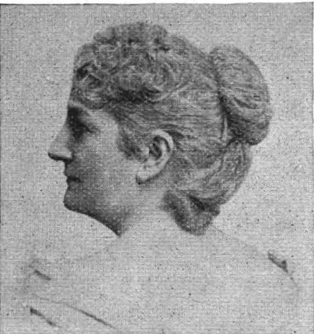
Emma Marcy Raymond (1895)

Her musical sympathies were almost entirely with the Italian and French schools. Being a firm believer in the gift of free and spontaneous melody, she believed that, where human emotions were to be portrayed in music, the proper means to use in such portrayal was the human voice, and she left to the instruments the task of accompanying. She became known for her musical talent being credited as being one of the first American women to compose an operetta: in 1889 she composed the successful Doretta. She produced another in Chicago called The Sheik. Her songs and piano pieces were published in France and Germany as well as in the U.S. Amongst her songs were "O Salutaris", "Bird of Love", and "First Love". She was the author of Spanish Bolero in E Flat; Ave Maria, Had I My Wish, and others of lesser importance, but equally well-written, such as the Manhattan Beach Polka, Straight Tip Waltz, and Toboggan Galop. Still others included, "Welcome Home", "The Shadows Lie", "Had I My Wish", "Old Stone Bridge", and "Bright Eastern Morn".

Raymond was the author of several pieces sung by Adelina Patti, and her productions covered the entire field of music. Her musical compositions were frequently heard at the Eden Musée and Patrick Gilmore's concerts. She was a prolific writer and was equally adept in the composition of a waltz, a ballad, an operetta or a sacred song. In 1887, four of Raymond's new works, "Untold", "Cragside", "Beyond the Gates", and "The Toboggan Galop", were published by Oliver Ditson & Co., Boston. "Pat in fairyland; comic opera in 3 acts", libretto by E. E. Marcy, music by Emma Marcy Raymond was published in the following year by Erastus Edgerton Marcy of New York. Raymond's opera Dovetta was produced in New York in 1889. In June of that year, the Times Herald of Port Huron, Michigan reported that Raymond had lost nearly US$15,000 through the failure of this opera. Subsequently, Raymond wanted Harry Paulton to write the libretto for a comic opera, the music of which she would furnish. In that way, she hoped to regain the money which she lost on Dovetta. In 1891, she published "The Sheik; a comic opera in 3 acts", libretto by Harry and Edward Paulton, music by Salvator Sylvain (Raymond's pseudonym).

Raymond was a patron of the Metropolitan Opera House and numbered many singers and prima donnas amongst her friends.

== Personal life ==
She married, on October 26, 1860, Captain Edward A. Raymond; the union was childless.

During the winter of 1896–1897, she commissioned the artist Adolfo Müller-Ury to paint a portrait of the bass-baritone Pol Plançon for her, which was subsequently exhibited in March 1897 at the Durand-Ruel Galleries in New York. It is now untraced.

She later lived in an apartment in the Ansonia, 2109 Broadway between West 73rd and 74th streets in New York. During the summer of 1913, Raymond was recorded on the Social Register as staying at the Oriental Hotel Manhattan Beach.

She died on November 7, 1913, and was buried in Green-Wood Cemetery, Brooklyn, New York. She left an estate valued at not less than US$500,000, directed that the property at No. 396 Fifth Avenue be sold and the proceeds turned over eventually to Hahnemann Hospital, in memory of her father. Her family apparently later challenging the probate on her estate in the courts. In June 1914, the probate of the will was denied by a Surrogate, on the ground that the instrument had been drawn improperly. The denial resulted in the loss of more than $250,000 to Hahnemann Hospital.

== Selected works ==
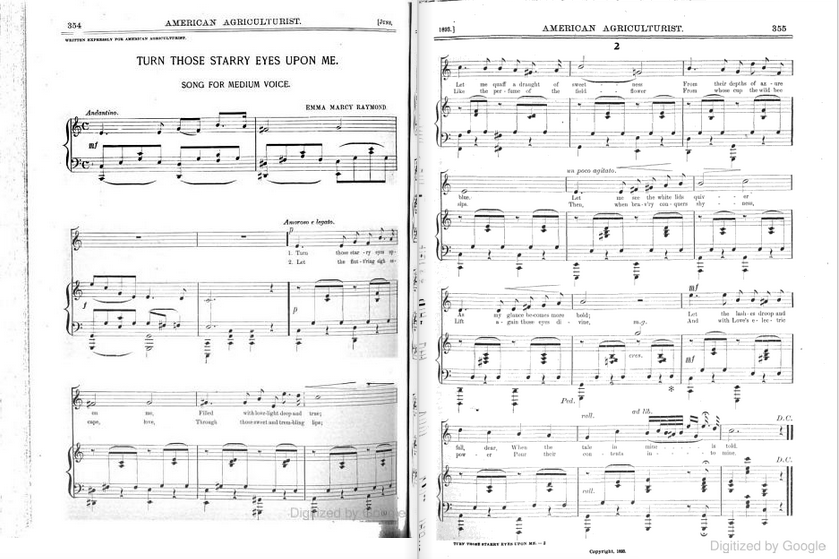
"Turn Those Starry Eyes Upon Me. Song for Medium Voice", by Emma Marcy Raymond (1893)

Compositions

- "A vision : song", 1886
- "Untold", 1887
- "Cragside", 1887
- "Beyond the Gates", 1887
- "Toboggan galop : for the pianoforte", 1887
- "Had I My Wish", 1890
- "Turn Those Starry Eyes Upon Me. Song for Medium Voice", 1893
- "First Love", 1894
- "By the shallow brook", 1900
- "The secret", 1900
- "Ave Maria"
- "Bird of Love"
- "Bright Eastern Morn"
- "Had I My Wish"
- "Manhattan Beach Polka"
- "O Salutaris"
- "Old Stone Bridge"
- "The Shadows Lie"
- "Spanish Bolero" in E Flat
- "Welcome Home"

Waltzes

- "Straight Tip Waltz"

Comic operas

- "Pat in fairyland; comic opera in 3 acts" (libretto by E. E. Marcy, music by Emma Marcy Raymond), 1888
- Dovetta, 1889
- The Sheik; a comic opera in 3 acts (libretto by Harry and Edward Paulton, music by Salvator Sylvain), 1891
