= William Weightman III =

American bigamist (1895–1965)

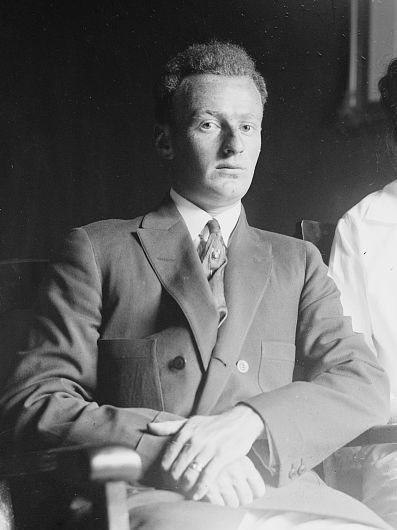
- Weightman, circa 1913
- Born: William Walker Weightman; February 4, 1895 Philadelphia, Pennsylvania, U.S.
- Died: June 13, 1965 (aged 70) Norristown, Pennsylvania, U.S.

Champ Car career
- 4 races run over 2 years
- Best finish: 21st (1916)
- First race: 1916 Vanderbilt Cup (Santa Monica)
- Last race: 1917 George Washington; Sweepstakes (Ascot Speedway)
Wins	Podiums	Poles
0	1	0

William Walker Weightman (February 4, 1895 – June 13, 1965), who styled himself as William Weightman III, was an American bigamist who was the great-grandson of tycoon William Weightman, one of the richest men in American history. Weightman's arrest, conviction, and subsequent suicide attempt were the subject of considerable attention.

When William Weightman died in 1904 leaving a $30 million estate, his heirs launched a legal battle over who would inherit it. Weightman III eventually received $750,000 (equivalent to $26,875,000 in 2025). He was occasionally a racing driver.

In 1925, he was convicted of bigamy and sentenced to two years in prison.

On July 10, 1926, he was sent back to Auburn Prison by a grand jury in Vineland, New Jersey.

When his second wife left him, Weightman attempted to commit suicide with a pistol on November 10, 1926.
