= Third Avenue (disambiguation) =

Third Avenue is a thoroughfare in Manhattan and the Bronx, in New York City.

Third Avenue, 3rd Avenue or 3 Av may also refer to:

- Third Avenue (Brooklyn), a thoroughfare in Brooklyn, New York City
- 3rd Avenue (Filipino band)
- 3rd Avenue (American band)
- Third Avenue (album), by Fredo, 2019
- Third Avenue (film), a 2021 Nigerian comedy
- 3 Av, the third day of Av, the fifth month of the Hebrew calendar

== See also ==
- or
- or
- 3rd Street (disambiguation)
- Third Avenue Bridge (disambiguation)
- Third Avenue Historic District (disambiguation)
- Third Avenue station (disambiguation)
- Third Avenue Railway, a former street railway company in Manhattan and the Bronx
- IRT Third Avenue Line, a former elevated railway line in Manhattan and the Bronx
- BMT Third Avenue Line, a former elevated railway line in Brooklyn
- Third and Lexington Avenues Line, a bus line
