= 3rd Street =

3rd Street or Third Street may refer to:

- 3rd Street (Los Angeles)
- 3rd Street (Manhattan)
- Third Street (Hong Kong)
- Third Street (San Francisco)
  - T Third Street, Muni Metro line in San Francisco
- N3RD Street (Philadelphia)

== See also ==
- 3rd Street station (disambiguation), train stations of the name
- Third Avenue (disambiguation)
