= Girard Avenue =

Street in Philadelphia, Pennsylvania

Coordinates: 39.968821°N 75.134447°W

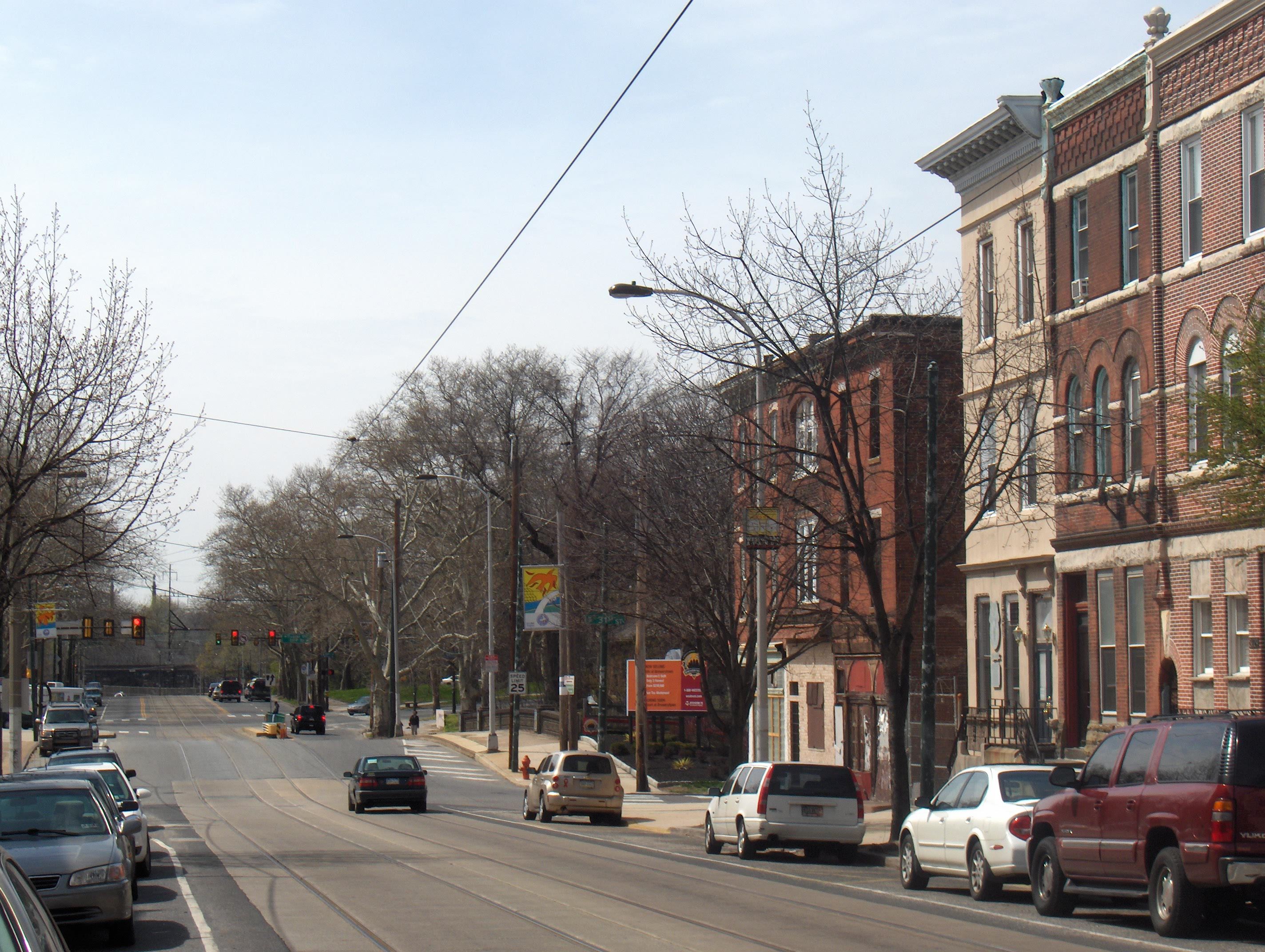
- Girard Avenue seen from 30th Street and looking west to Fairmount Park
- Interactive map of Girard Avenue
- Maintained by: PennDOT and City of Philadelphia
- Length: 7.8 mi (12.6 km)
- Component highways: US 30 between Cathedral Park and West Fairmount Park; US 13 between West Fairmount Park and Fairmount Park; SR 2008 between West Fairmount Park and Richmond Street
- Location: Philadelphia
- West end: 67th Street in West Philadelphia
- Major junctions: US 30 in Cathedral Park; US 13 / I-76 / US 30 in West Fairmount Park; US 13 in Fairmount Park; PA 611 in Yorktown; Frankford Avenue in Fishtown; I-95 in Fishtown
- East end: Richmond Street in Fishtown

Girard Avenue is a major commercial and residential street in Philadelphia. For most of its length it runs east–west, but at Frankford Avenue it makes a 135-degree turn north. Parts of the road are signed as U.S. Route 13 and U.S. Route 30.

== Route description ==
Girard Avenue begins in West Philadelphia at 67th Street, runs east through the Carroll Park neighborhood and the Centennial District, crosses the Schuylkill River via the Girard Avenue Bridge, and continues through East Fairmount Park and across North Philadelphia to Frankford Avenue in the Fishtown neighborhood. At Frankford Avenue it makes a 135-degree turn to the north and becomes East Girard Avenue, running parallel to the Delaware River until it ends at Richmond Street.

- East–west section: 6.8 miles (10.94 km).
- Northeast–southwest section: 1 mile (1.61 km).

As of 2023, most of Girard Avenue (from Fishtown to Lancaster Avenue) is part of Philadelphia's High Injury Network, the small fraction of city streets on which the majority of traffic deaths and serious injuries occur.

== History ==
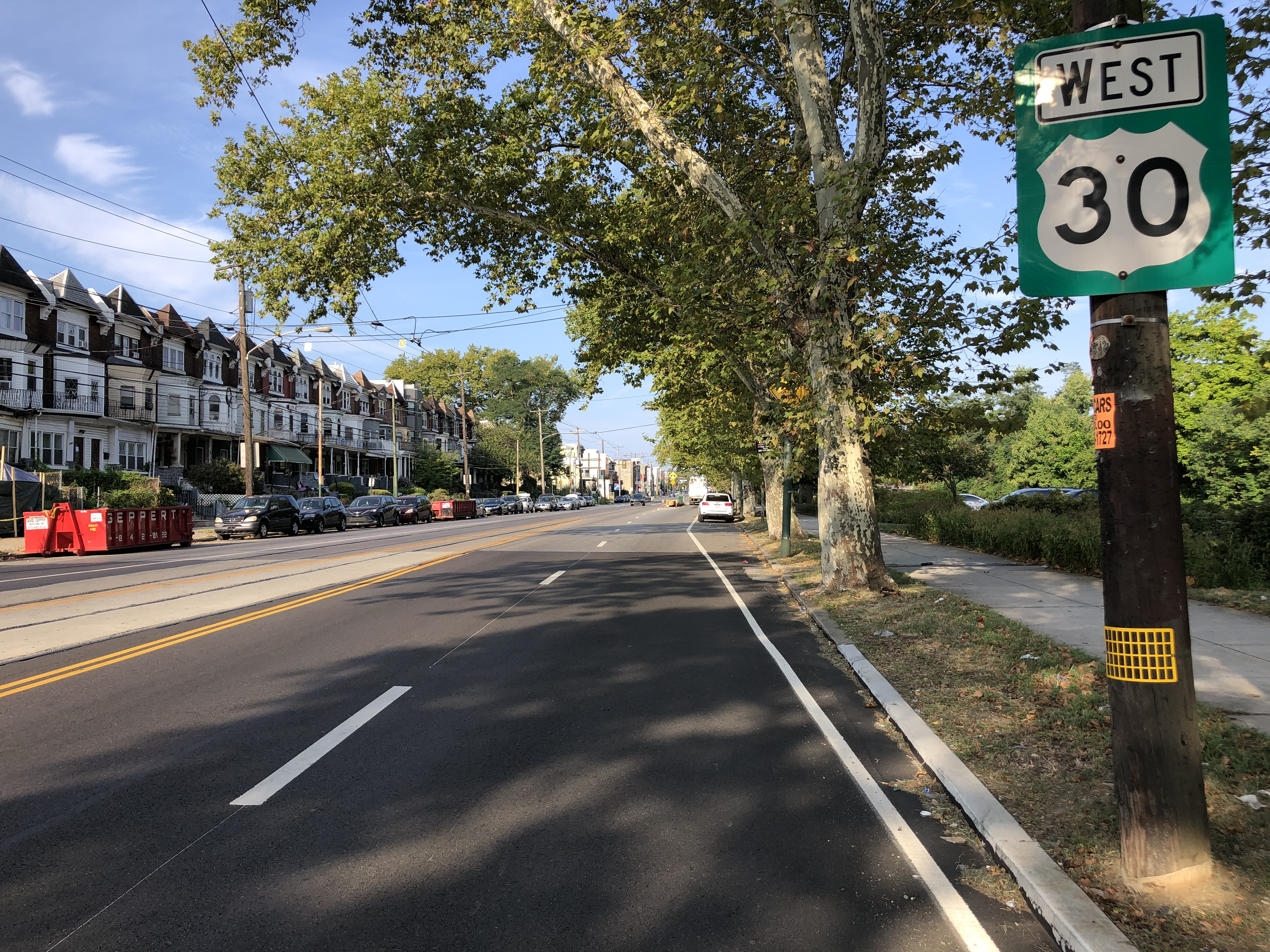
Girard Avenue (US 30) westbound past 38th Street in West Philadelphia

Girard Avenue was named for banker Stephen Girard (1750–1831) who, at his death, was the richest man in the United States – who directed that his fortune be used to found a trade school for orphaned boys.

The first Girard Avenue was a three-block street in North Philadelphia, between the 1800-block of Ridge Avenue and Corinthian Avenue, approaching the under-construction Girard College (confirmed by 1845). By 1852, the avenue had been extended west to 33rd Street; and in 1855, the timber-arched Girard Avenue Bridge carried it over the Schuylkill River and into West Philadelphia.

In 1858, the name Girard Avenue was adopted for the existing Franklin Street, which ran east–west between 6th Street and Frankford Avenue, including the existing Prince Street, that ran northeast-southwest between Frankford Avenue and Norris Street. The 12-block gap between 6th and 18th Streets was filled in before the Civil War. The West Philadelphia section of the avenue was extended to 64th Street in 1868; and to 67th Street in 1936.

In 1844, the area surrounding 2nd Street and Franklin Street (later Girard Avenue) was the site of several days of anti-Catholic nativist riots. Beginning May 3, the anti-immigrant American Republican Party held rallies in the Irish Catholic neighborhood of Kensington, provoking violence from its residents. Nativists responded by vandalizing houses and businesses owned by Catholics. Residents defended themselves with guns. Following several deaths, the Pennsylvania militia took control, but nativists returned in even larger numbers. The rioting reached its peak on May 8, when St. Michael's Church and its rectory, a Catholic school, and dozens of houses and businesses were burned.

As the state militia struggled to regain control in Kensington, another nativist mob burned St. Augustine's Church in the Old City neighborhood of Philadelphia. In all, more than 14 people were killed, an estimated 50 were injured, and more than 200 were forced to flee their homes. The Kensington riots may have been more anti-Irish than anti-Catholic — the nativists did not attack the German Catholic church under construction at 5th Street and present-day Girard Avenue.

In July 2024, it was announced that Philadelphia City Council would rename the corner of 58th Street and Girard Avenue in Philadelphia (near Woodson's childhood home) "Sgt. Waverly B. Woodson Way".

== Landmarks ==
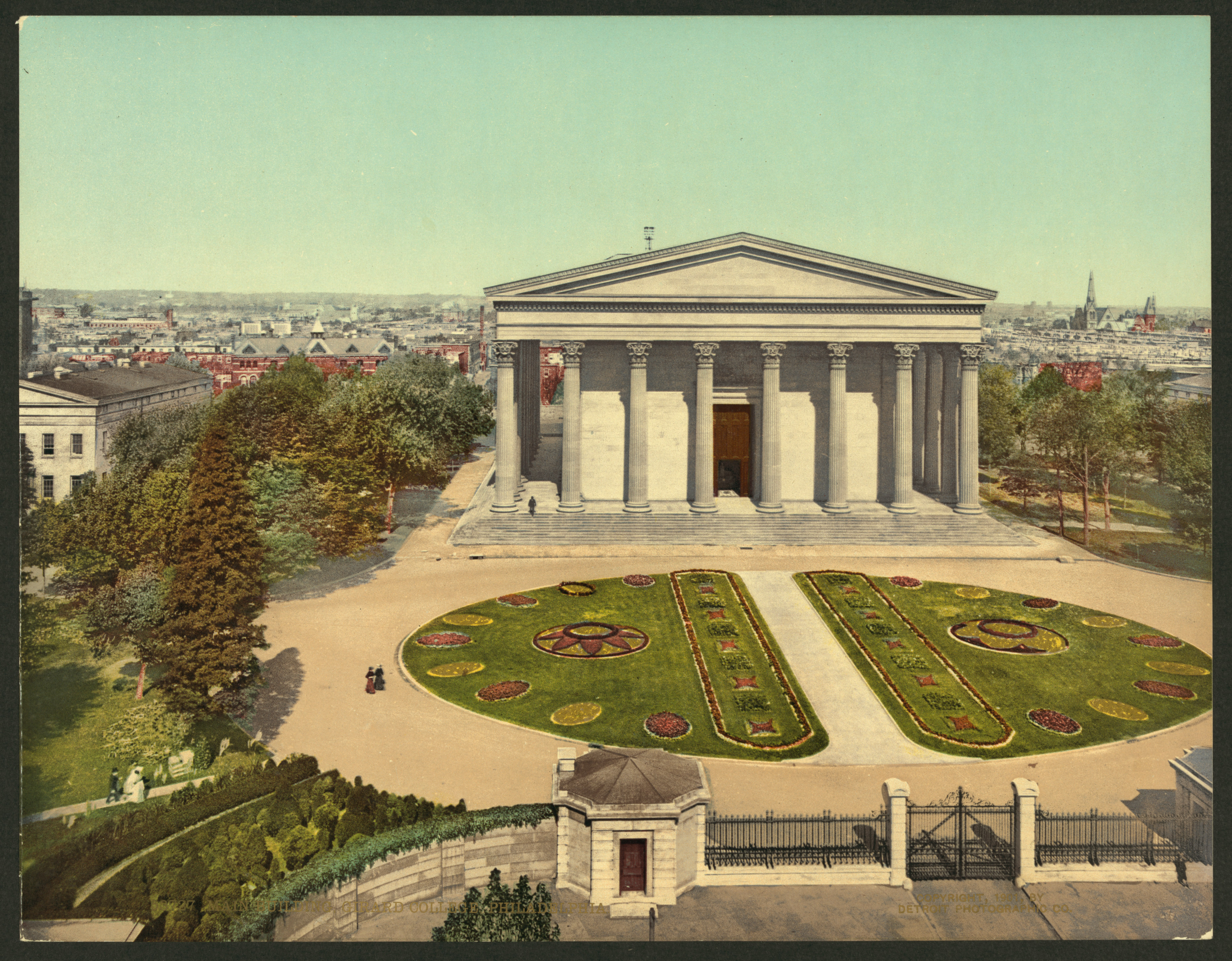
Founder's Hall at Girard College, built in 1847 and designed by Thomas Ustick Walter, illustrated on a 1901 postcard

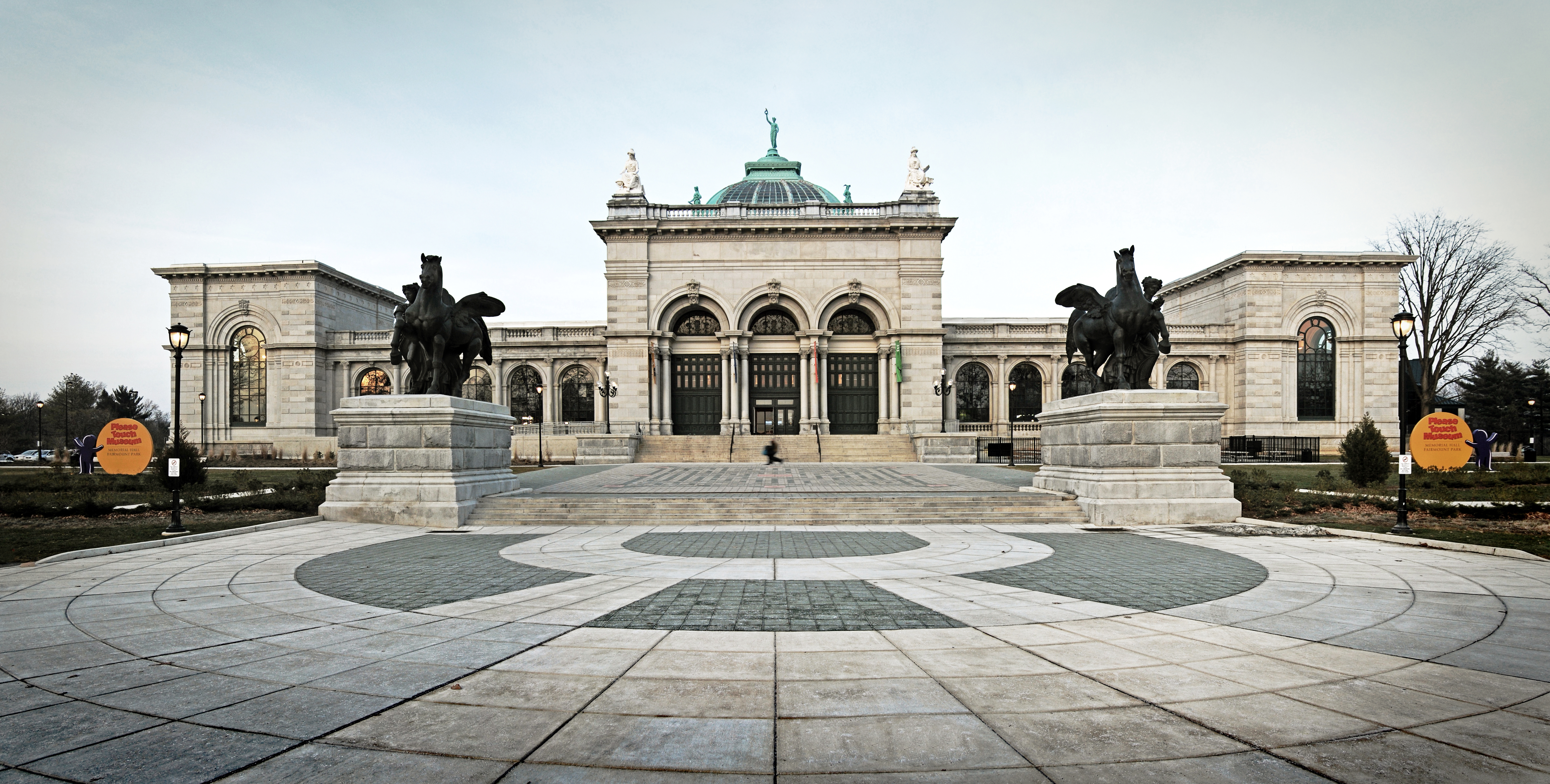
Memorial Hall, built in 1876, near 42nd Street and Girard Avenue, designed by Herman J. Schwarzmann

=== North Philadelphia ===
The major landmark of Girard Avenue in North Philadelphia is Girard College, a boarding school for underprivileged children. The avenue merges with South College Avenue between 19th and 25th Streets to bypass the school's 43 acre (17 ha) campus. Girard Avenue Historic District – located between the school and Broad Street – features architecturally significant residential and religious buildings. Girard Avenue West Historic District – located between the school and 29th Street – features architecturally significant commercial and residential buildings. Brewerytown Historic District – located between 30th Street and East Fairmount Park – features architecturally significant residential and industrial buildings. The Berean Institute, a vocational school for mostly African American adult learners located on Girard Avenue, opened in 1899 and closed in 2012.

Girard Avenue east of Broad Street was a major shopping and entertainment district for lower North Philadelphia. Most of the late-19th and early-20th century theaters have been demolished, and surviving ones have been converted to other uses.

St. Peter the Apostle Church, at 5th Street, houses the National Shrine of Saint John Neumann (1811–1860), the fourth Bishop of Philadelphia and the first American man to be canonized as a Roman Catholic saint. The Church of the Gesu, at 18th Street, built as a neighborhood Catholic Church, now serves as the chapel for Saint Joseph's Preparatory School. The Green Hill Presbyterian Church, between 16th and 17th Streets, a Gothic Revival church that pre-dated development of the area, was demolished in 2009 following decades of neglect.

Medical facilities include Girard Medical Center, at 8th Street and the Philadelphia Nursing Home, at 21st Street, is built on the former site of the Mary J. Drexel Home.

Hatfield House, at 33rd Street, is a colonial villa built in 1760, with Greek Revival additions from 1838. In 1930, it was relocated from Nicetown to East Fairmount Park. Girard Avenue Bridge (1972) is the third bridge over the Schuylkill River at that location. It incorporates some of the decorative ironwork from the second bridge (1874).

=== West Philadelphia ===
Landmarks of Girard Avenue in West Philadelphia include the Philadelphia Zoo, at 34th Street; the Letitia Street House, relocated from Old City to West Fairmount Park in 1883 (under the mistaken belief that it had been the residence of Pennsylvania's founder William Penn), near 35th Street; Smith Memorial Arch, an American Civil War monument and the gateway to West Fairmount Park, near 41st Street.

Memorial Hall, the art gallery from the 1876 Centennial Exposition, now home to the Please Touch Museum, near 42nd Street; and Old Cathedral Cemetery, at 48th Street to just east of North 52nd Street. The avenue bounds the southern end of Carroll Park between 58th and 59th Streets, for which the neighborhood Carroll Park is named. At North 65th Street is the Haddington Library, designed by Albert Kelsey, which opened in 1915.

The Stephen Smith Home for the Aged, at 44th Street, a nursing home built by Quakers in 1871 to provide care for infirmed African Americans, including American Civil War veterans, was demolished in 2009.

=== Fishtown ===
The Kensington National Bank (1877, Frank Furness, architect), at Frankford Avenue, is still in use as a bank. The Green Tree Tavern (1845, Joseph Singerly, architect), at Marlborough Street, is on the National Register of Historic Places. The First Presbyterian Church of Kensington (1857, Samuel Sloan, architect), at Columbia Avenue, survives, although its tall steeple has been removed.

== Transportation ==
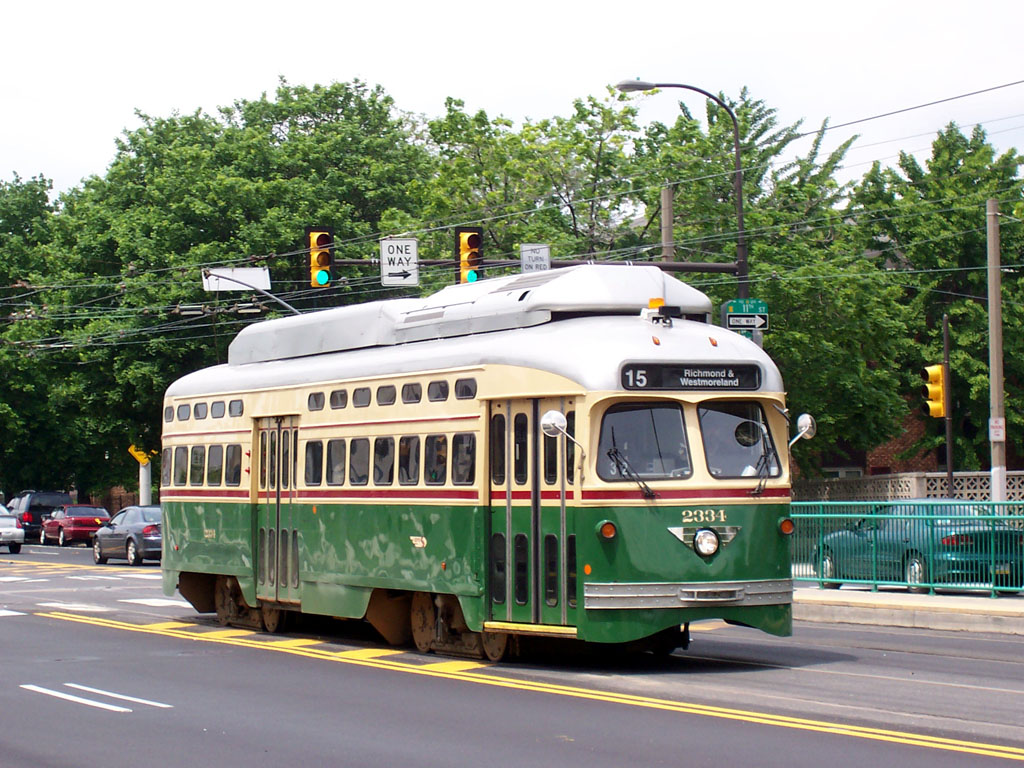
Girard Avenue Trolley at 11th Street

The Girard Avenue Trolley (SEPTA Route 15) follows a circuit from West Philadelphia to Kensington. A trolley begins the route at the Haddington Loop at 63rd Street, runs on the eastbound tracks along Girard Avenue, crosses the Girard Avenue Bridge, continues across North Philadelphia to Frankford Avenue, makes a 45-degree turn onto East Girard Avenue, follows that for a mile (East Girard Avenue ends), and completes the route along Richmond Street. At Westmoreland Street, the trolley makes a 180-degree turn around the Richmond-Westmoreland Streets Loop, and begins a return on the westbound tracks.

In 1901, the Girard Avenue trolley had approximately eight million passengers.

Girard Subway Station, part of the Broad Street Line, is located beneath the intersection of Broad Street and Girard Avenue.

Girard El Station, part of an elevated section of the Market–Frankford Line, is located above the intersection of Front Street and Girard Avenue.

U.S. Route 13 runs northward along 34th Street by the Philadelphia Zoo, where it merges with Girard Avenue and crosses the Schuylkill River via the Girard Avenue Bridge, and then splits to continue northward along 33rd Street.

The proposed Girard Avenue Expressway, a below-grade superhighway that would have connected Interstate 95 (Delaware Expressway) with Interstate 76 (Schuylkill Expressway) and continued through West Philadelphia to the city line, was abandoned in 1977 following public opposition.

== Gallery ==
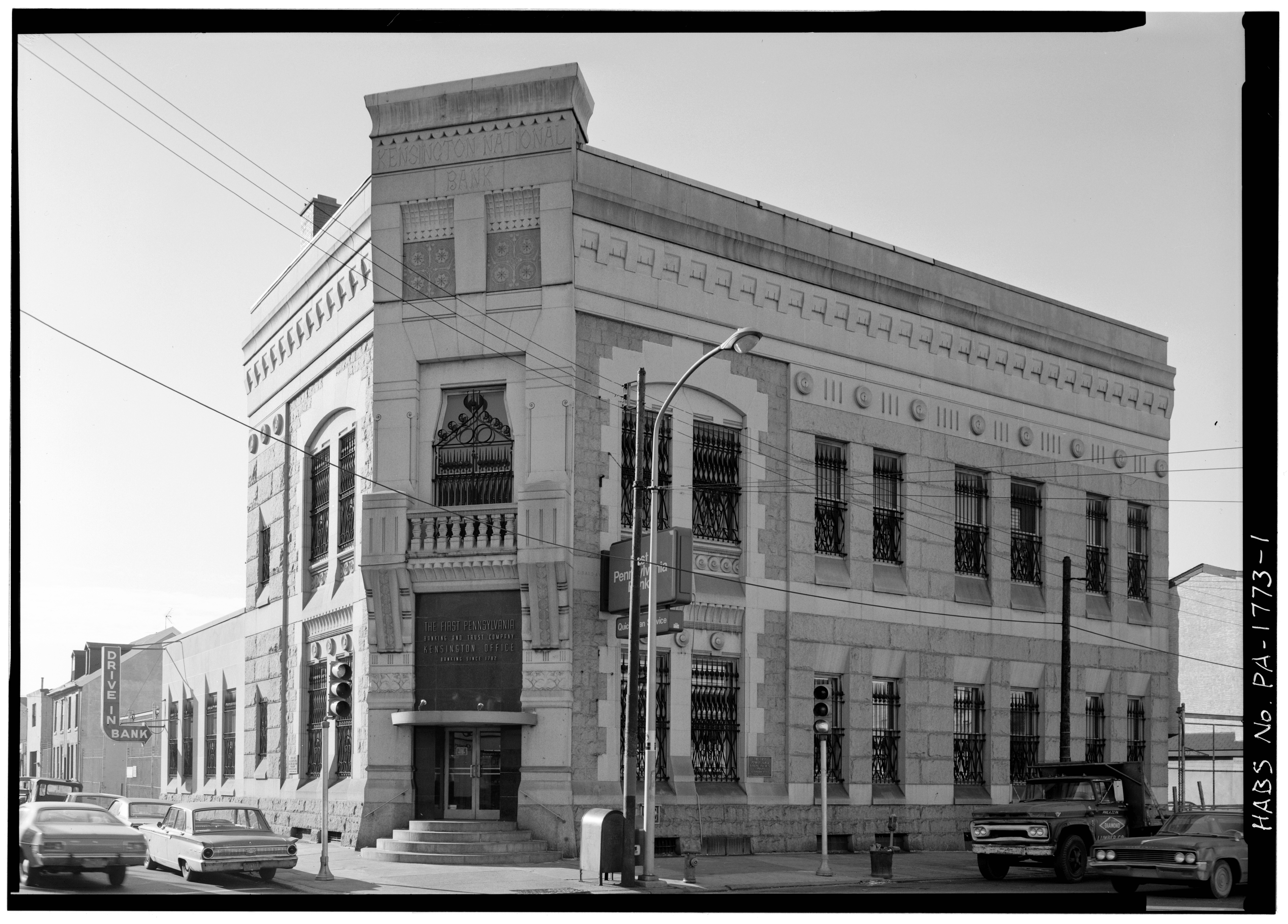
Kensington National Bank, built in 1877 and designed by Frank Furness, at the southwest corner of Frankford and Girard Avenues

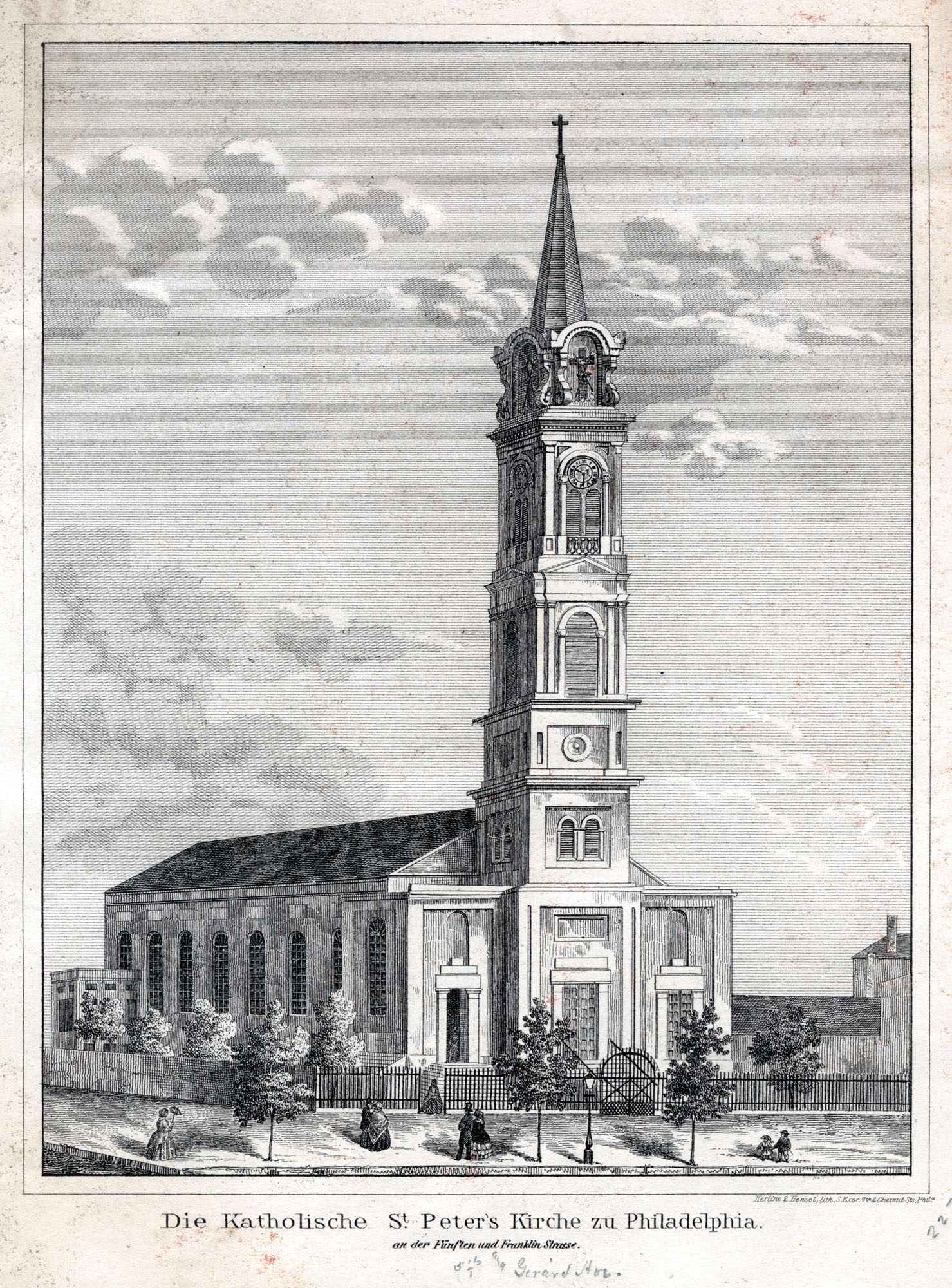
St. Peter the Apostle Church, built in 1847 and designed by Napoleon Le Brun, and located at the southeast corner of 5th Street and Girard Avenue

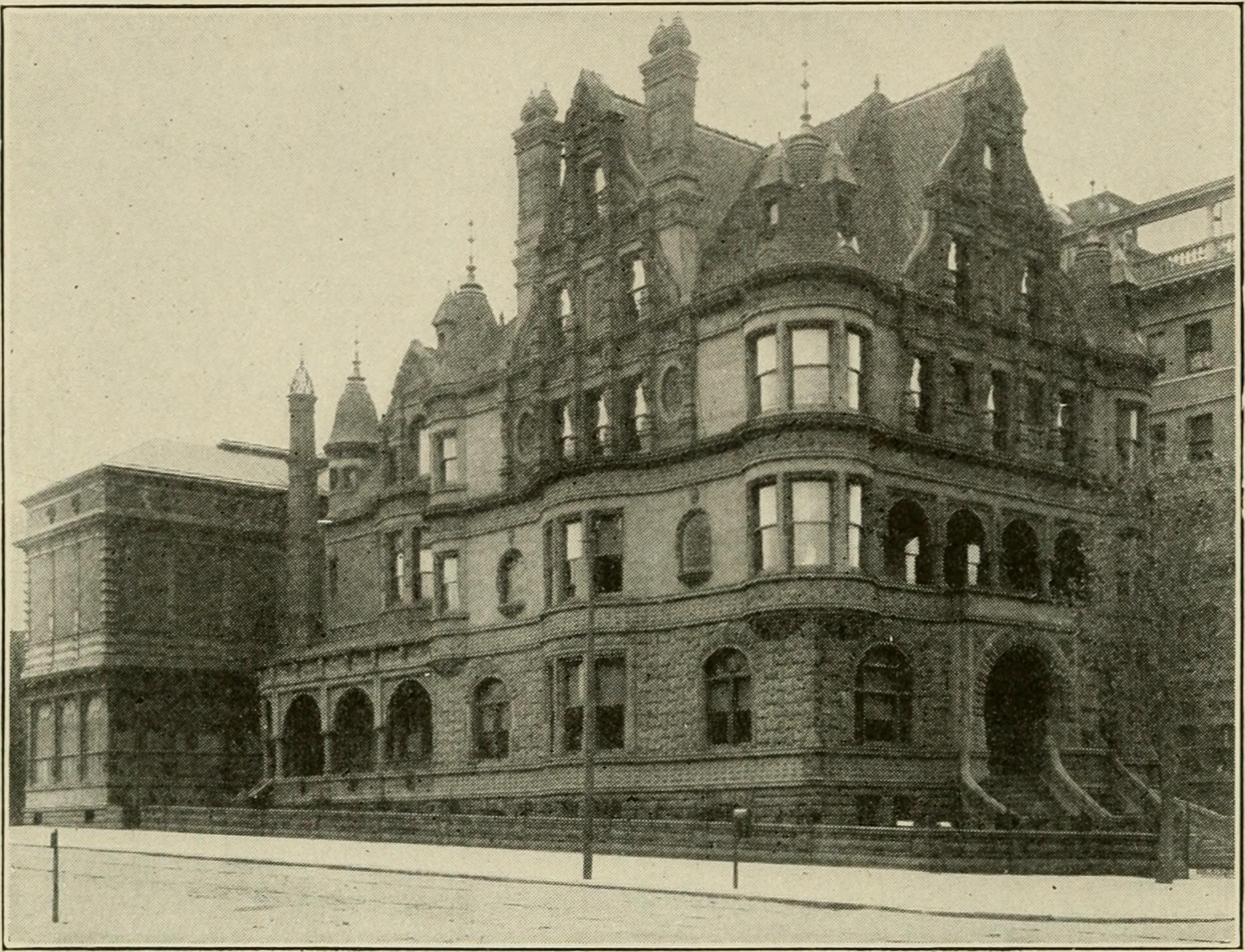
P.A.B. Widener Mansion (1887, demolished 1980), NW corner Broad Street & Girard Avenue, Willis G. Hale, architect.

Green Hill Presbyterian Church (1848, demolished 2009), 1617 Girard Avenue, John Notman, architect. Elevation: HABS

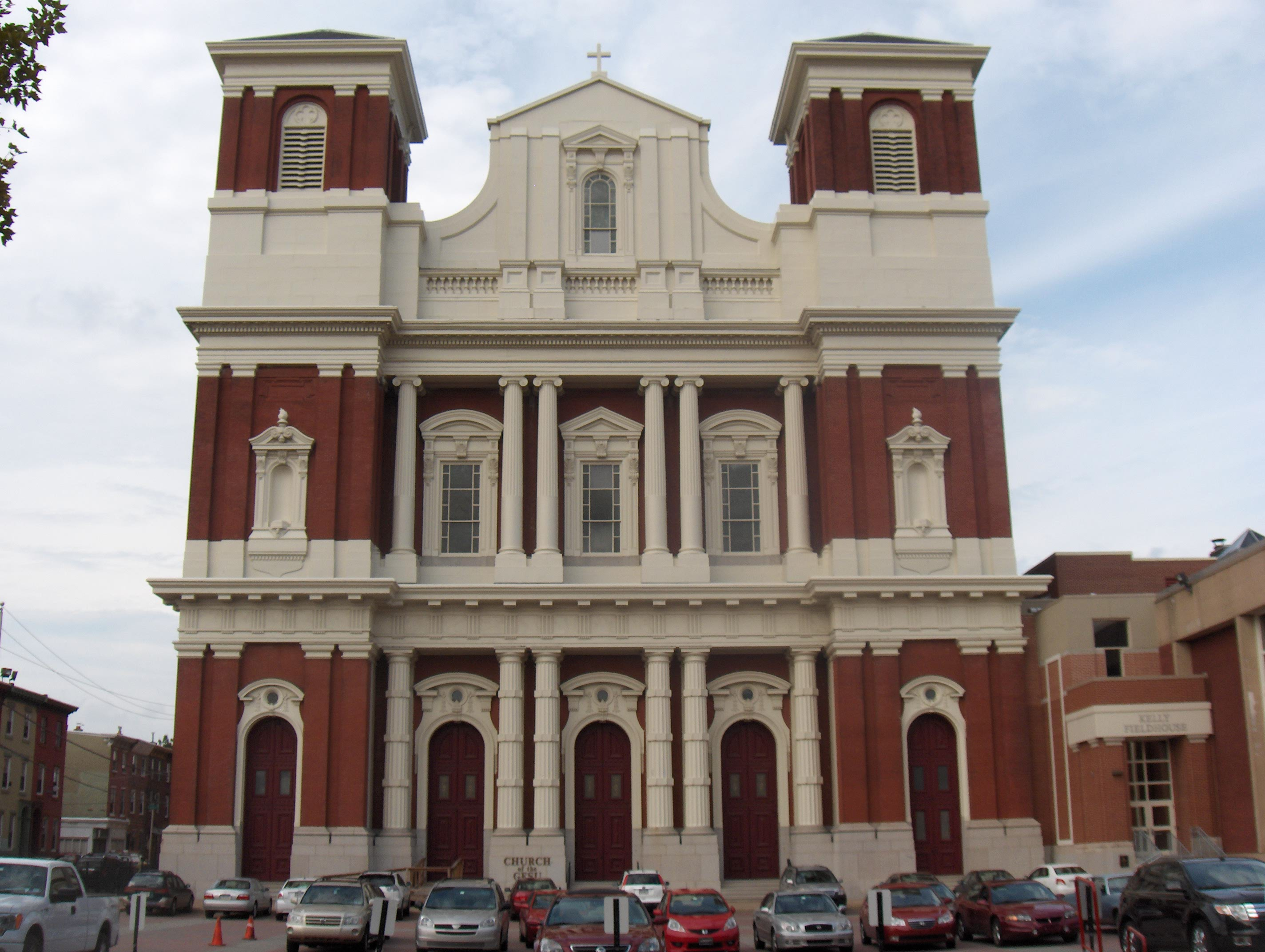
Church of the Gesu (1888), NE corner 18th Street & Girard Avenue, Edwin Forrest Durang, architect. On the campus of Saint Joseph's Preparatory School.

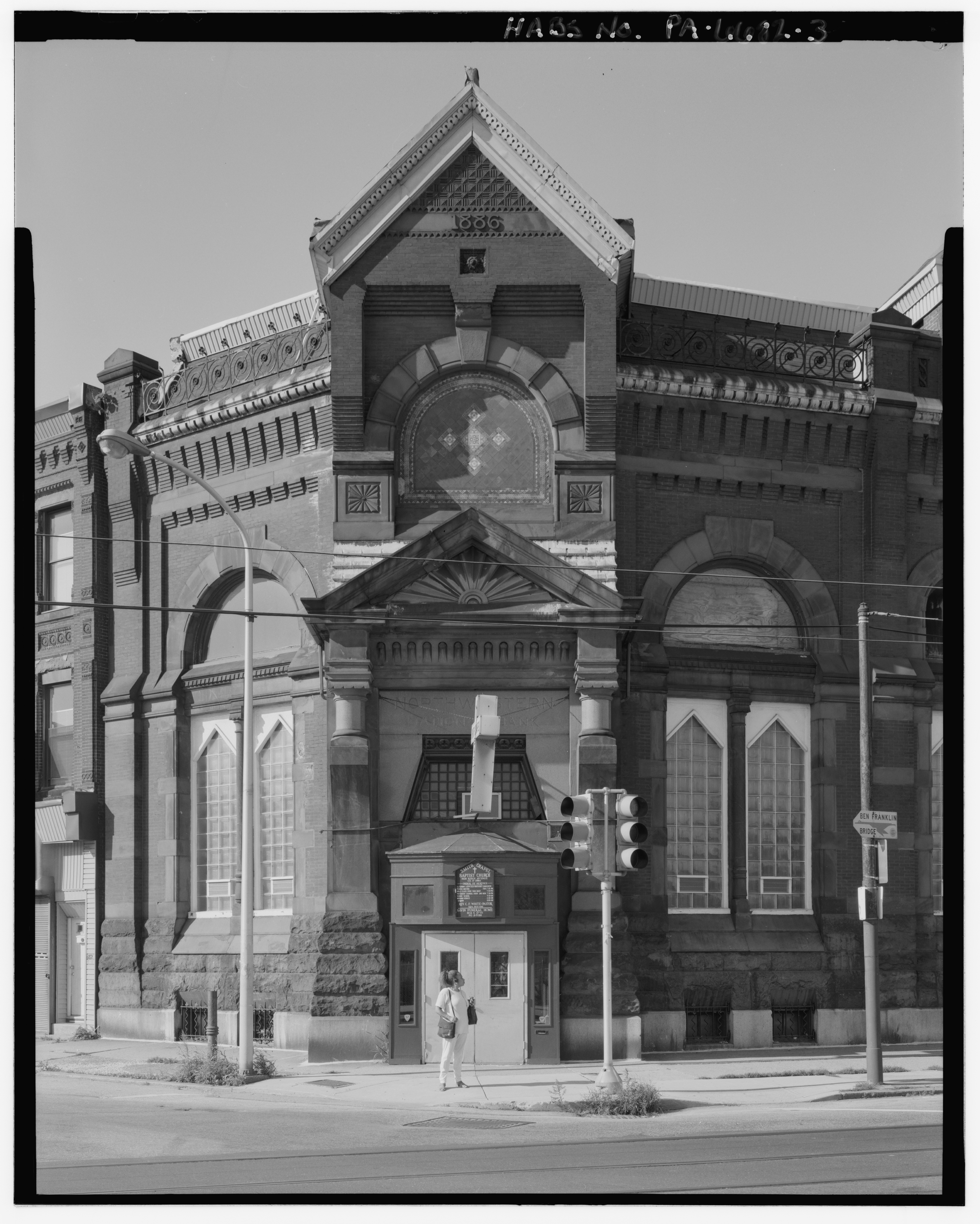
Northwestern National Bank (1886), SW corner Ridge & Girard Avenues, Otto C. Wolf, architect. Part of Girard Avenue Historic District. Photo: HABS

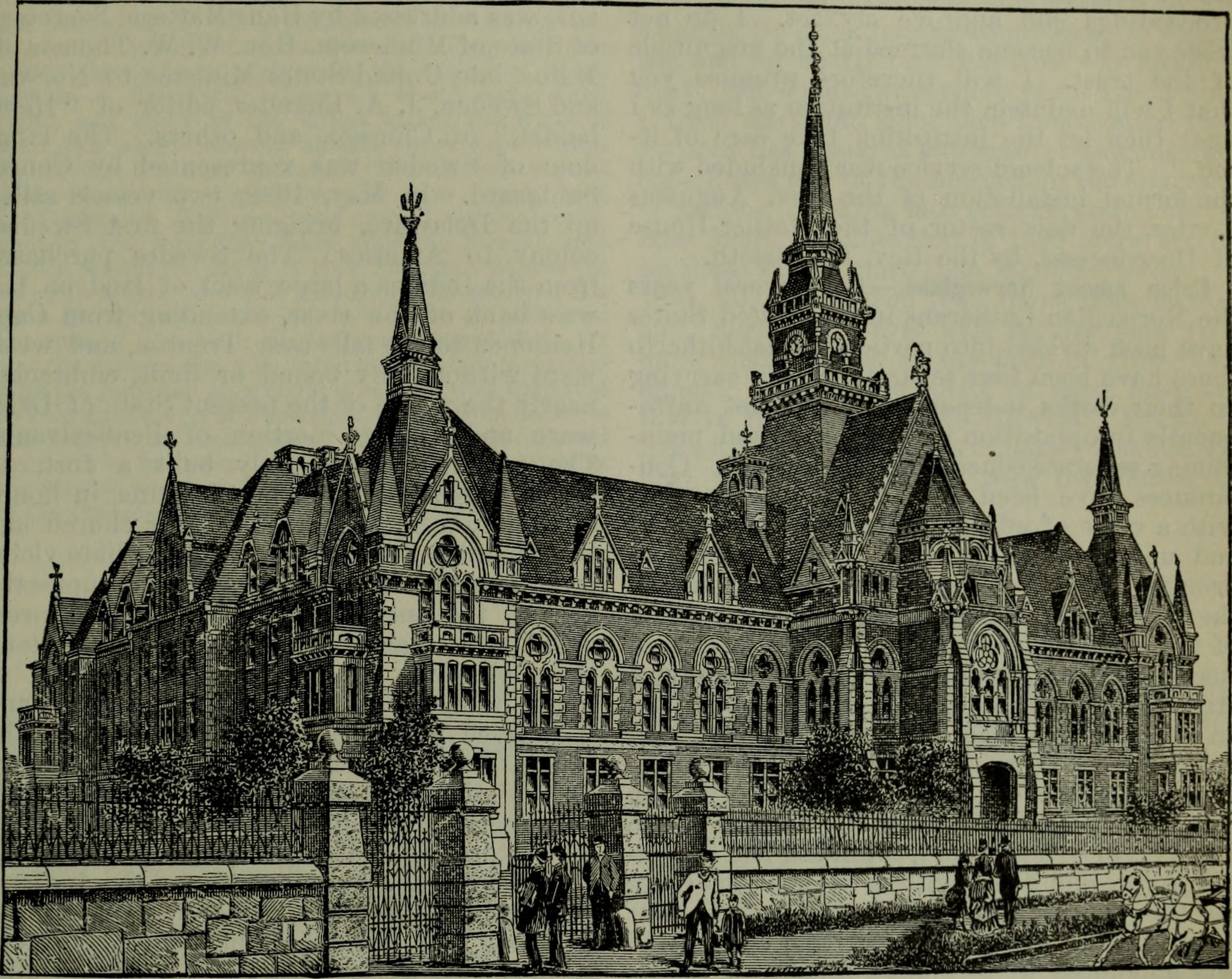
Mary J. Drexel Home (1887, demolished), Girard & Corinthian Avenues. Now site of the Philadelphia Nursing Home.

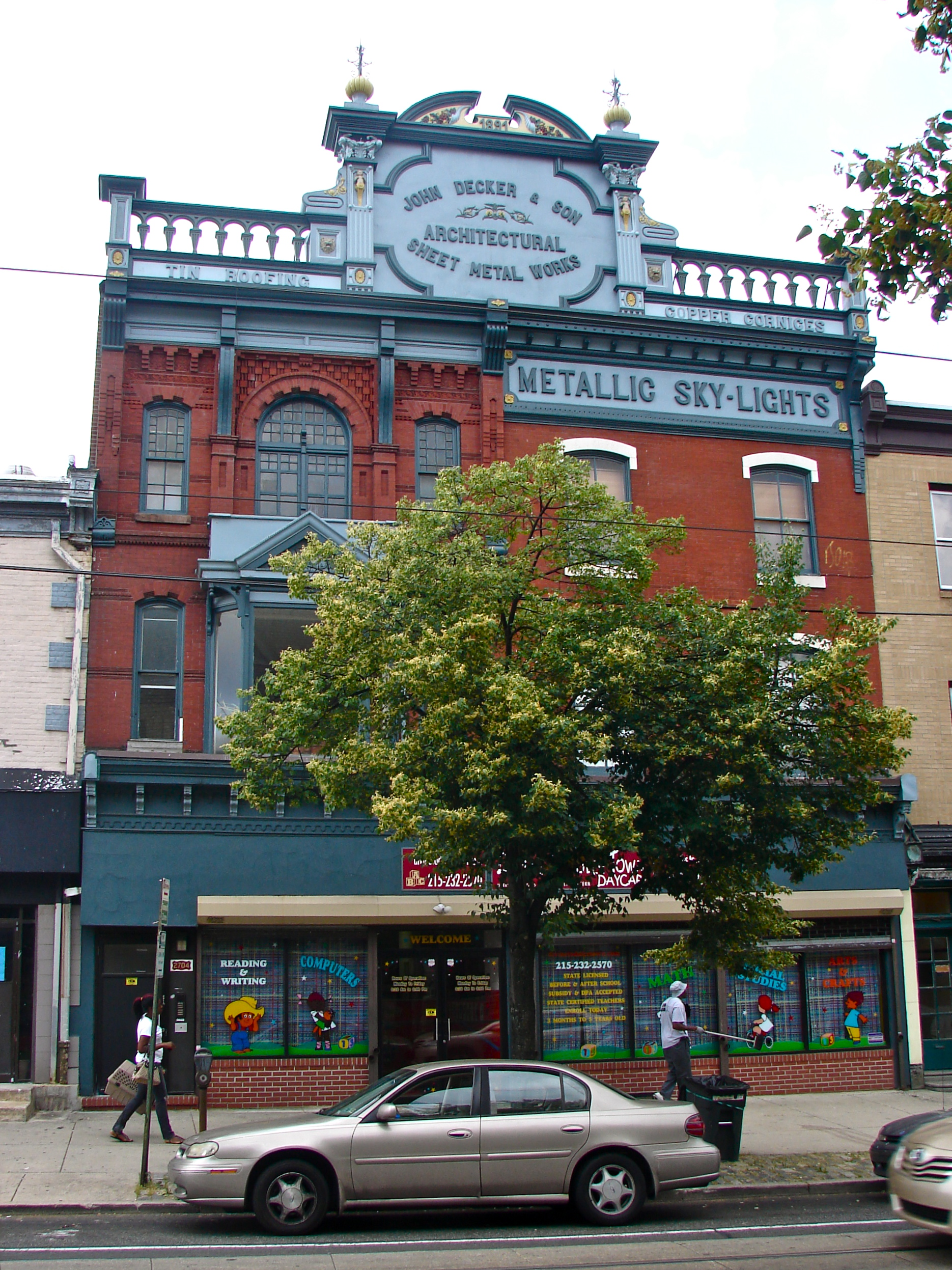
John Decker & Son Building (1891), 2702-04 Girard Avenue. Part of Girard Avenue West Historic District.

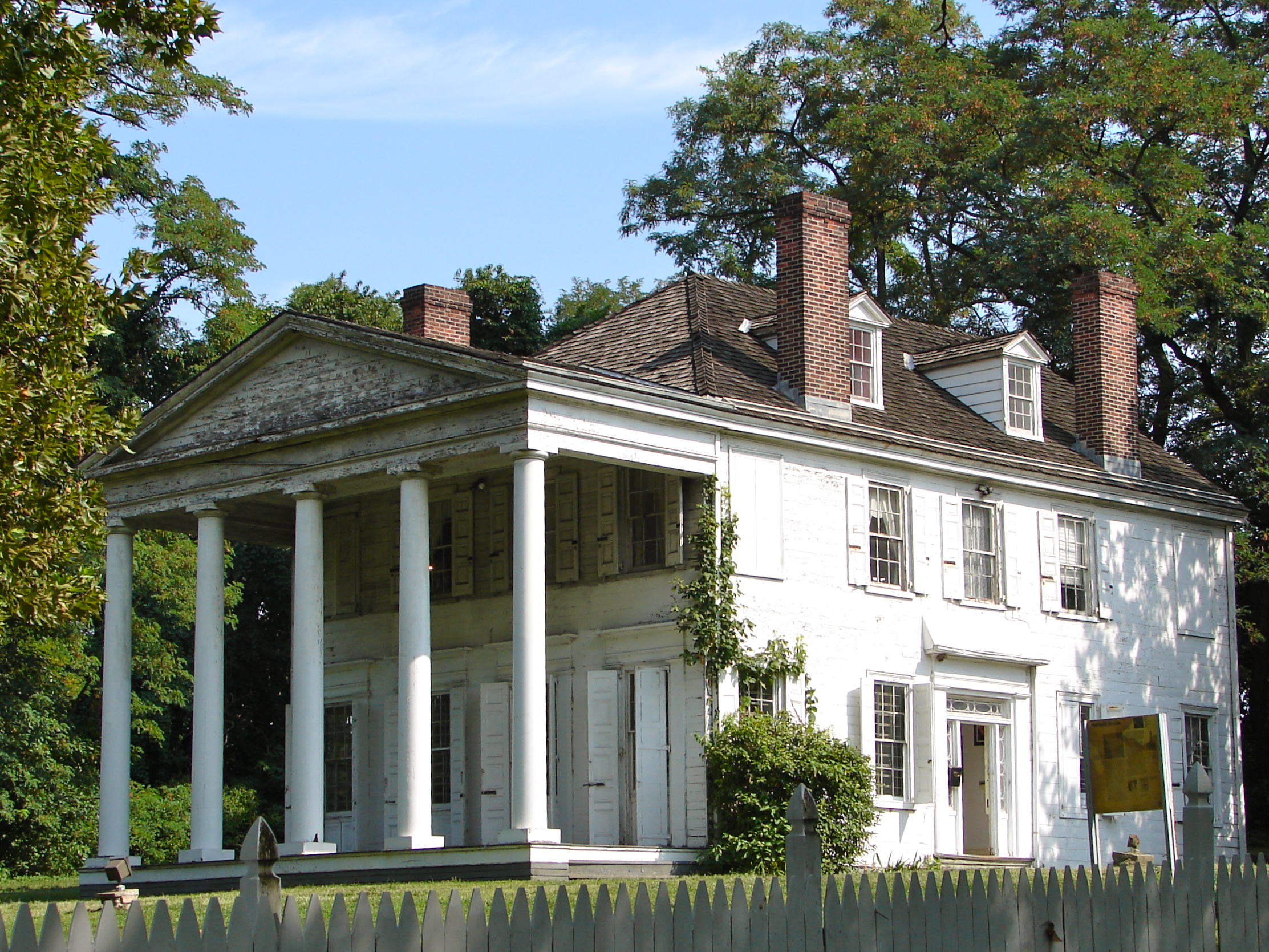
"Hatfield House" (1760, 1838), 33rd Street & Girard Avenue, East Fairmount Park.

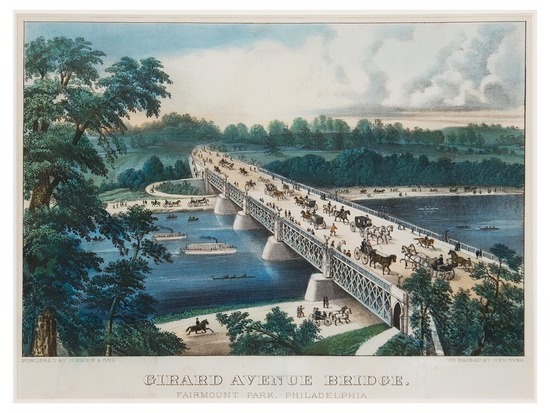
Second Girard Avenue Bridge, in an 1874 lithograph.

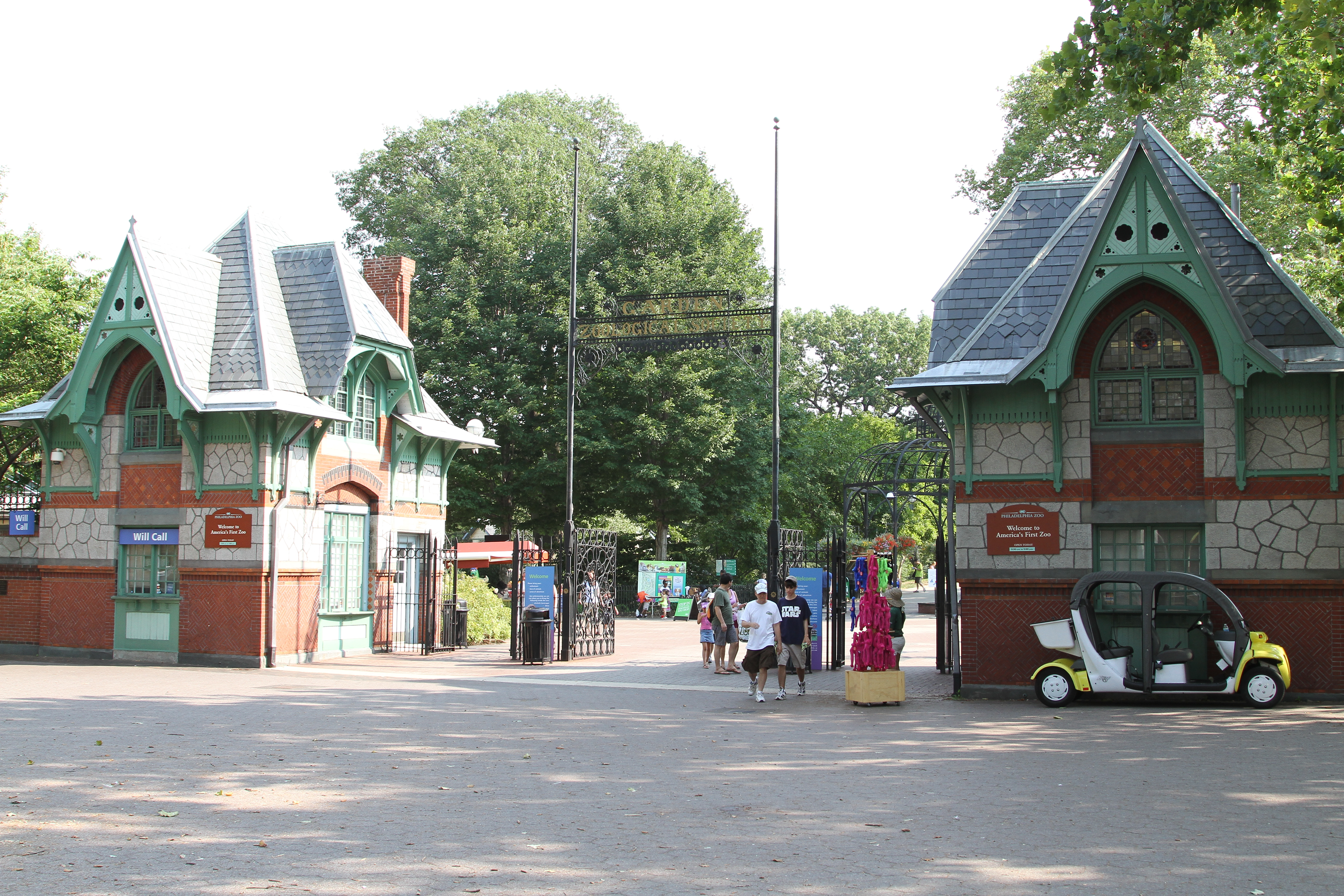
Philadelphia Zoo Gatehouses (1876), 34th Street & Girard Avenue, Frank Furness, architect.

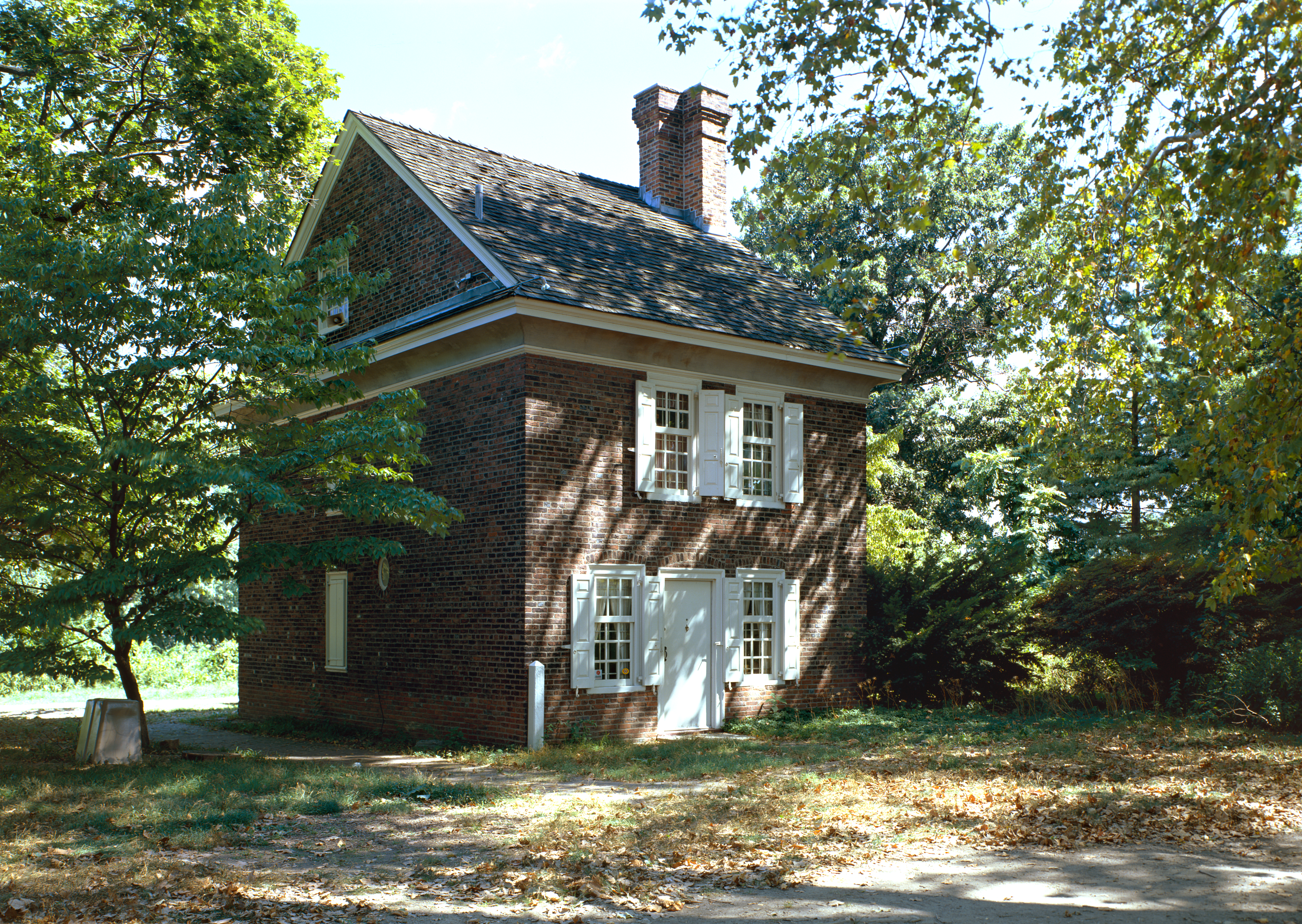
Letitia Street House (1715, relocated 1883), Letitia Walk & Girard Avenue, West Fairmount Park.

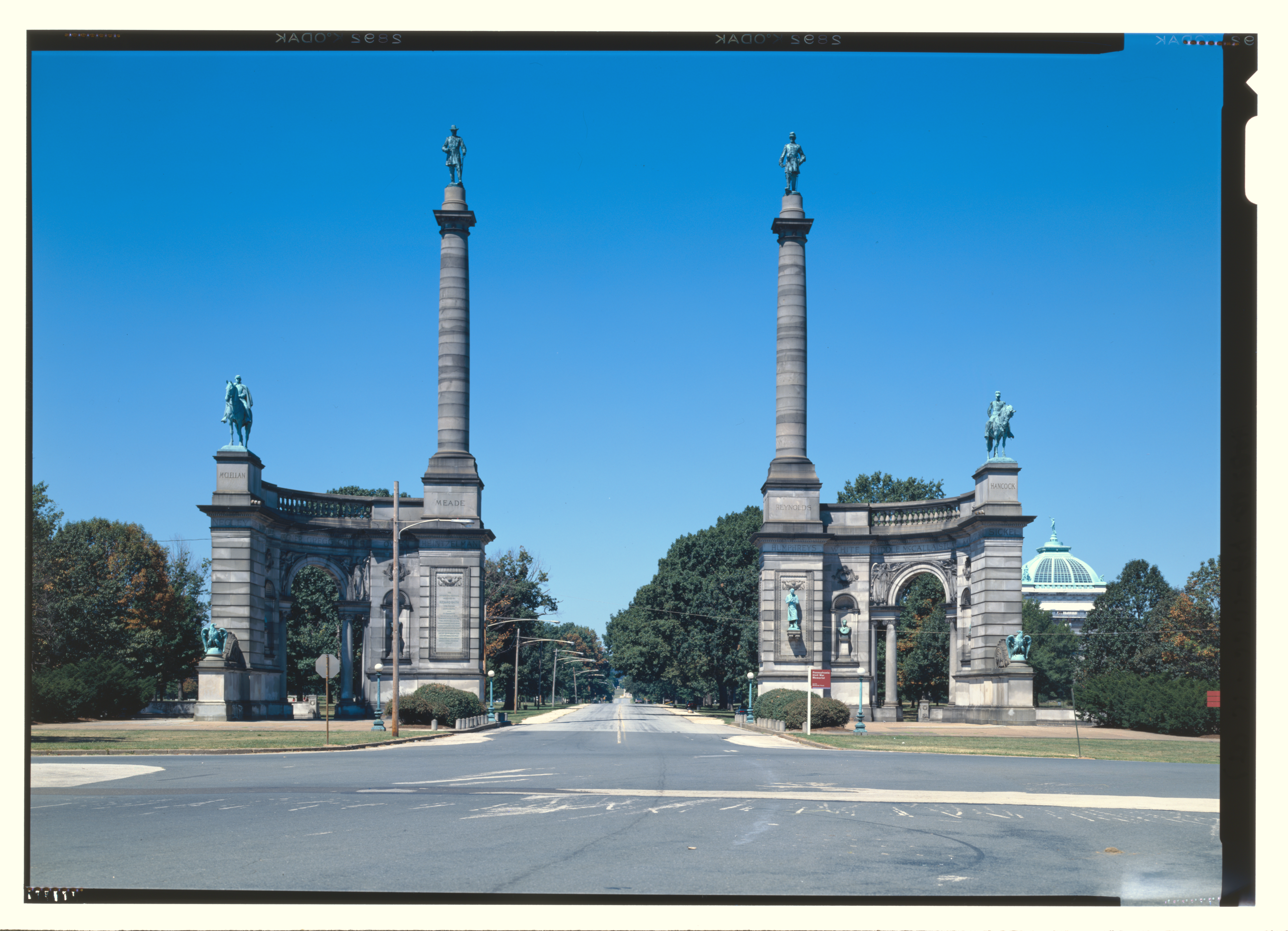
Smith Memorial Arch (1912), near 41st Street & Girard Avenue, West Fairmount Park, James H. Windrim, architect.

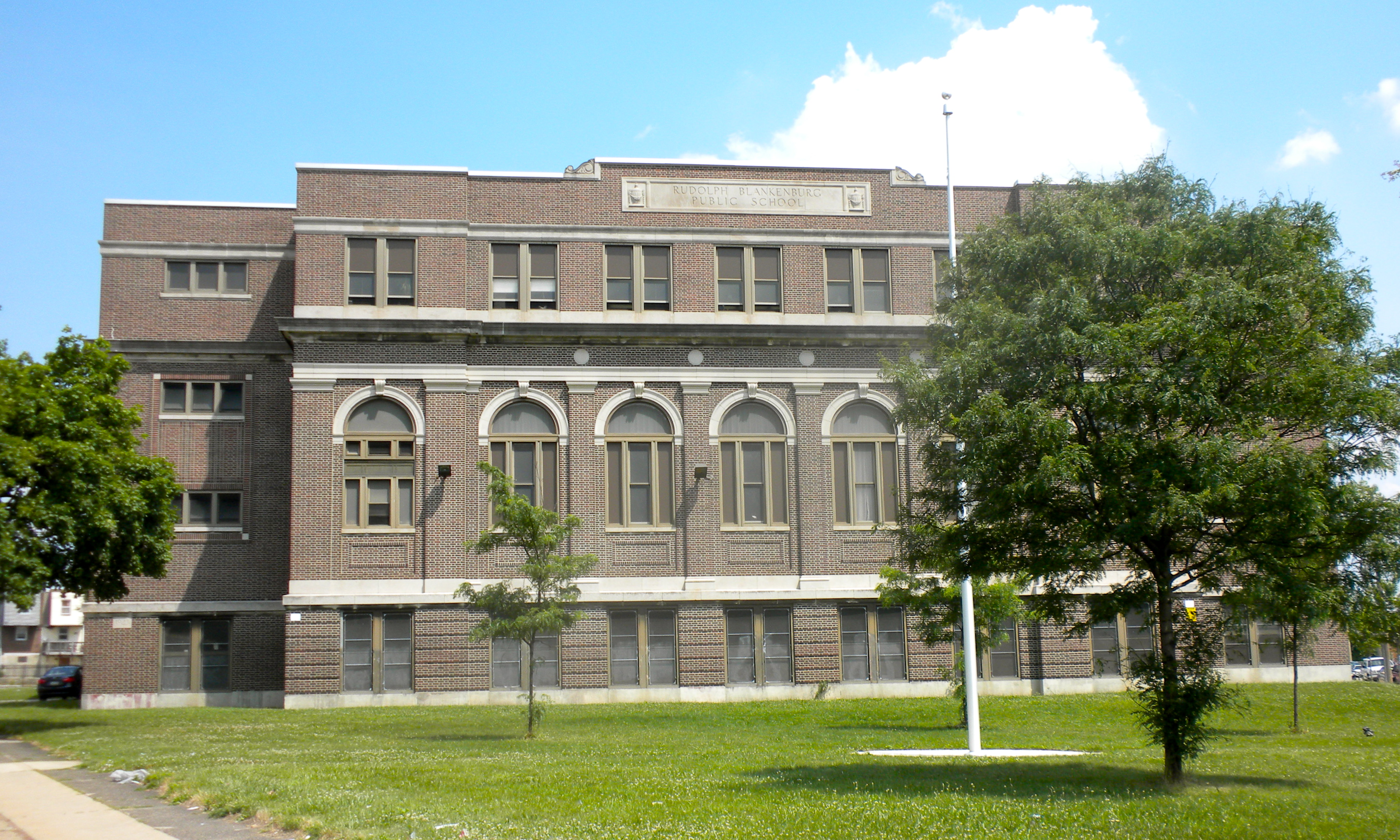
Rudolph Blankenburg School (1925), 46th Street & Girard Avenue, Irwin T. Catharine, architect.

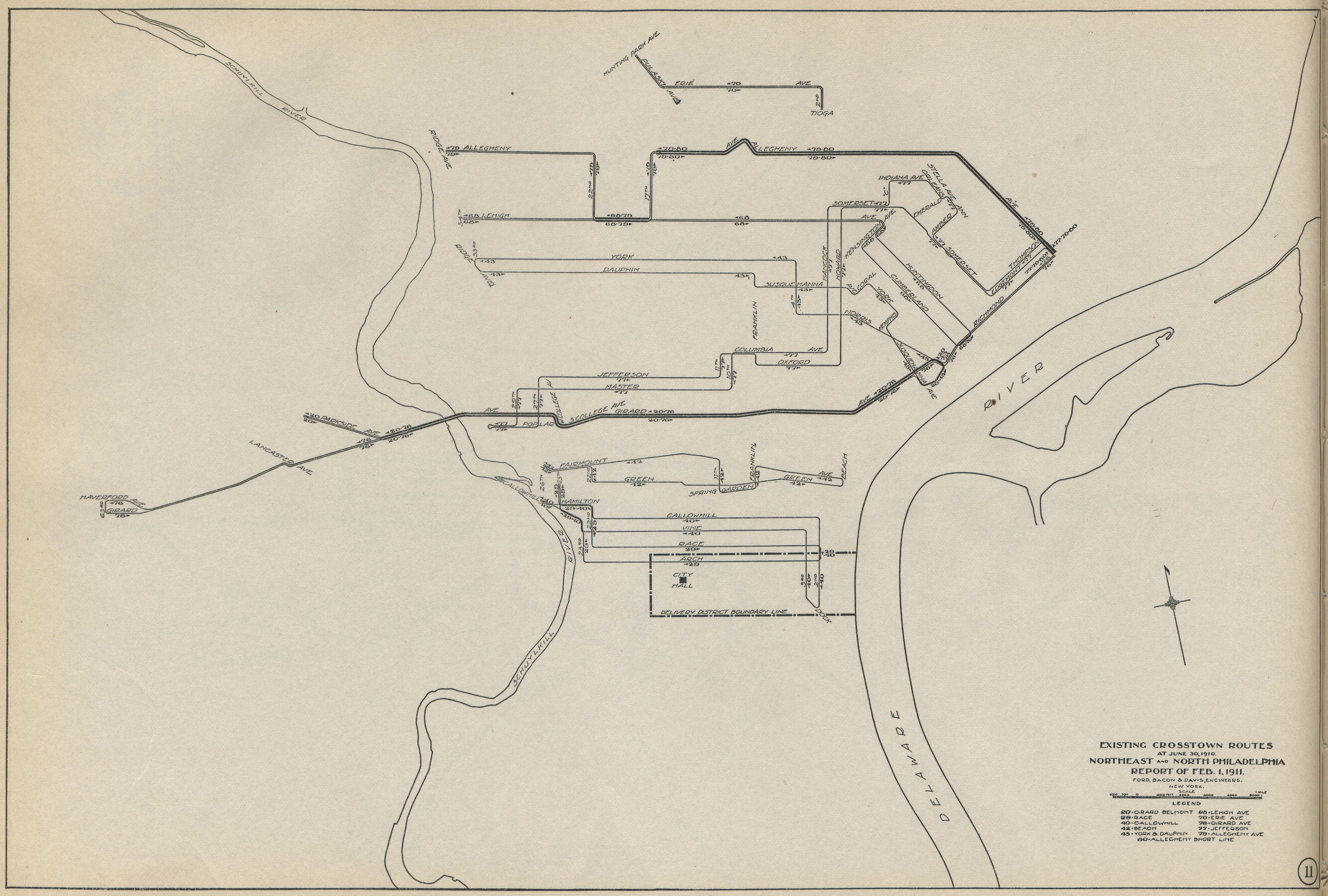
Girard Avenue Trolley route (1911).

== See also ==
- List of richest Americans in history
- National Register of Historic Places listings in Northeast Philadelphia
- National Register of Historic Places listings in North Philadelphia
- National Register of Historic Places listings in West Philadelphia
