= Penn Treaty School =

- Penn Treaty School (as Penn Treaty Junior High School)
- U.S. National Register of Historic Places
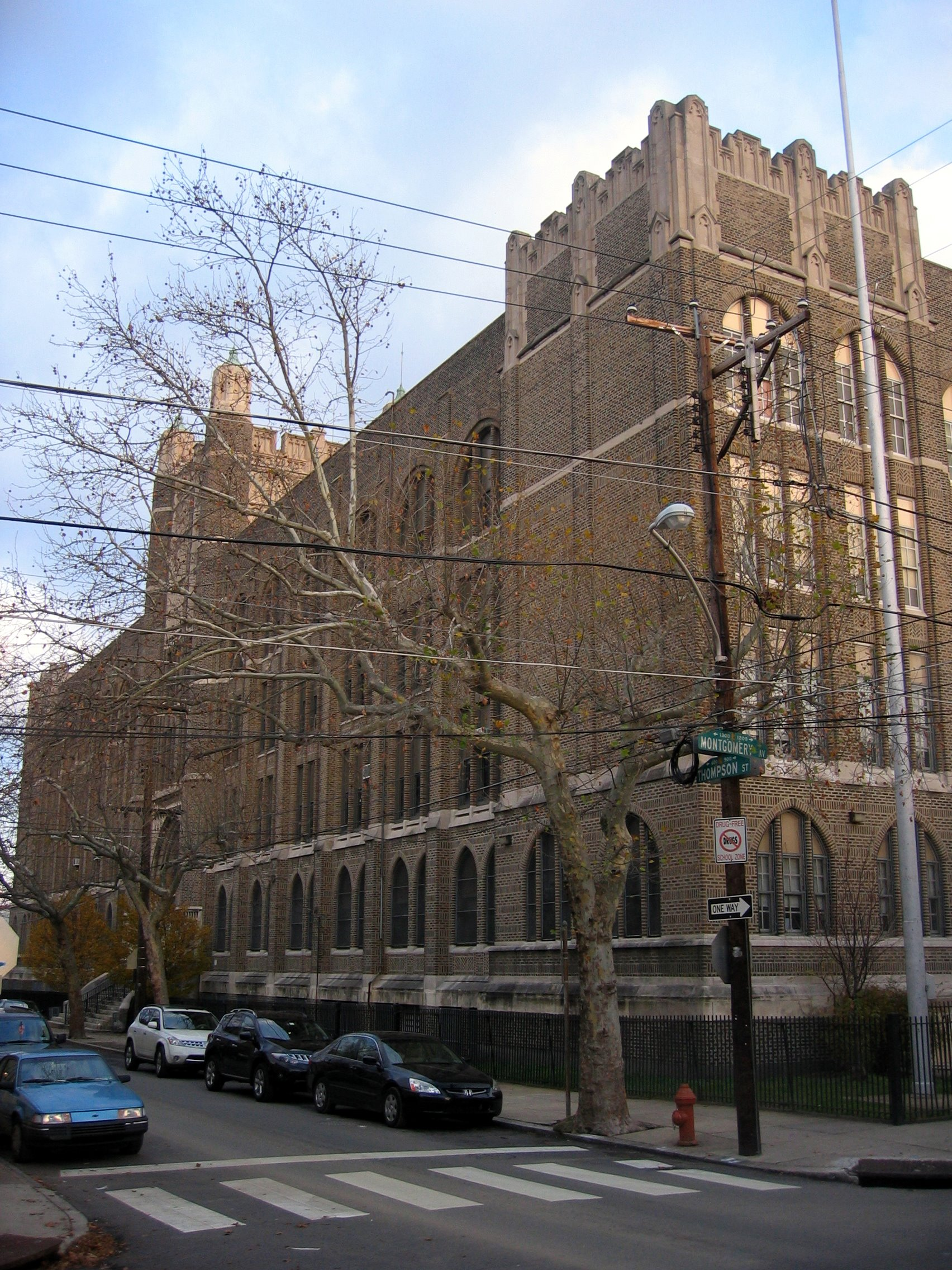
- Penn Treaty School, November 2009

- Location within Philadelphia Location within Pennsylvania Location within the United States
- Location: 600 E. Thompson St., Philadelphia, Pennsylvania, U.S.
- Coordinates: 39°58′21″N 75°7′40″W
- Area: 1.3 acres (0.53 ha)
- Built: 1927-1928
- Architect: Catharine, Irwin T.
- Architectural style: Late Gothic Revival
- Website: penntreaty.philasd.org
- MPS: Philadelphia Public Schools TR
- NRHP reference No.: 88002311
- Added to NRHP: November 18, 1988

The Penn Treaty School is an American public school that is located in the Fishtown area of Philadelphia, Pennsylvania, United States. A part of the School District of Philadelphia, it serves students in grades six through twelve and was formerly known as the Penn Treaty Junior High School and Penn Treaty Middle School.

It was added to the National Register of Historic Places in 1988.

== History and architectural features ==
This school is based in a historic building that was designed by Irwin T. Catharine and built between 1927 and 1928. It is a five-story, 17-bay, brick building that was created in the Late Gothic Revival style. It features a projecting end pavilions with arched openings, carved limestone decorative elements, a large stone Gothic entryway, and a large battlement tower. It was named to commemorate Penn's Treaty with the Indians.

It previously fed into Kensington High School.

As of 2015 it had about 700 students. During the 2017–2018 school year, the school's student population was 40% Hispanic, 30% African American, 20% Caucasian, and 10% Other.
