= Fishtown, Philadelphia =

Fishtown
- Neighborhood of Philadelphia
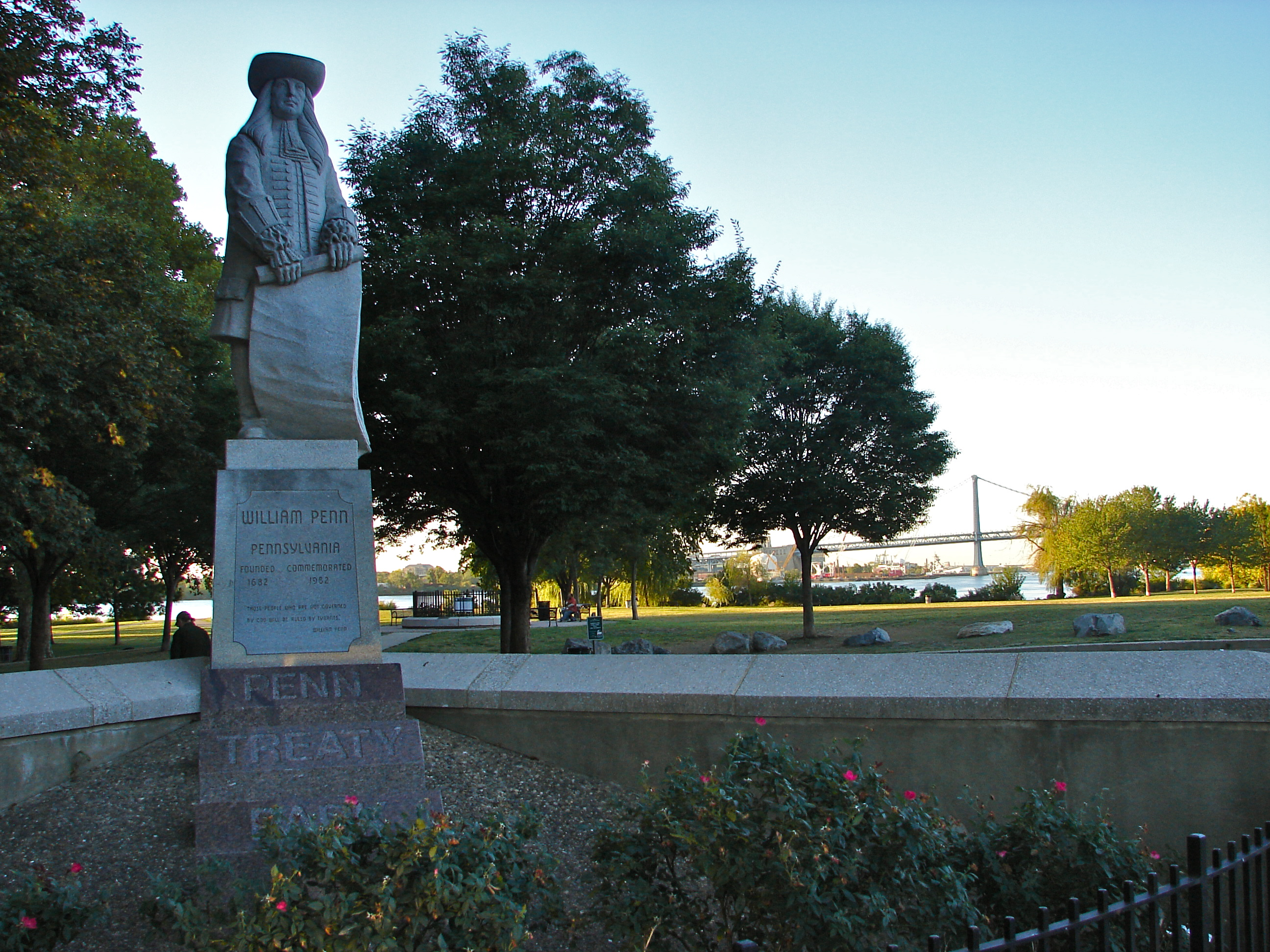
- Penn Treaty Park in Fishtown

- Location within Philadelphia
- Country: United States
- State: Pennsylvania
- County: Philadelphia County
- City: Philadelphia
- Area codes: 215, 267 and 445

Fishtown is a neighborhood in the River Wards section of Philadelphia, Pennsylvania, United States. Located northeast of Center City Philadelphia, its borders are somewhat disputed today due to many factors, but are roughly defined by the triangle created by the Delaware River, Front Street, and York Street. Some newer residents expand the area to Lehigh Avenue to the northeast, while some older ones shrink the area to Norris Street. It is served by the Market–Frankford Line rapid transit subway/elevated line of the SEPTA system, and the historic Route 15 Girard Avenue trolley line. Fishtown has long been a largely working class Irish Catholic and Irish American neighborhood, though in recent years it has seen a large influx of young urban professionals and gentrification.

The name Fishtown derives from one of the original occupations of its residents. Early settlers were fishermen and over time, they controlled the fishing rights to both sides of the Delaware River, from Cape May to the falls at Trenton. The apocryphal local legend traces the name of Fishtown to Charles Dickens, who purportedly visited the neighborhood in March 1842, but records show this to be false, as it was named Fishtown prior to his visit, at least as early as 1808, as evidenced in a newspaper article in The Tickler, an early 19th century Philadelphia newspaper.

== History ==
The area was originally inhabited by members of the Turtle Clan of the Lenape Indian tribe (whom the Europeans named the Delaware Indian Tribe). The first European settlers were a group of six Swedish farming families, later replaced by British landed gentry, then British shipbuilders and German fishermen. Fishtown was originally a small section of the town of Old Kensington, close to the Delaware River and just a few blocks long, roughly from Palmer Street north to Gunnar's Run, from the Delaware River to Moyer Street. The original town of Kensington was only 191.5 acres of land and originally called the Fairman Estate. Today's Penn Treaty Park sits where the Fairman Mansion once stood (actually Fairman Mansion sat in the middle of Beach Street, curb to curb, right north of Columbia Avenue).

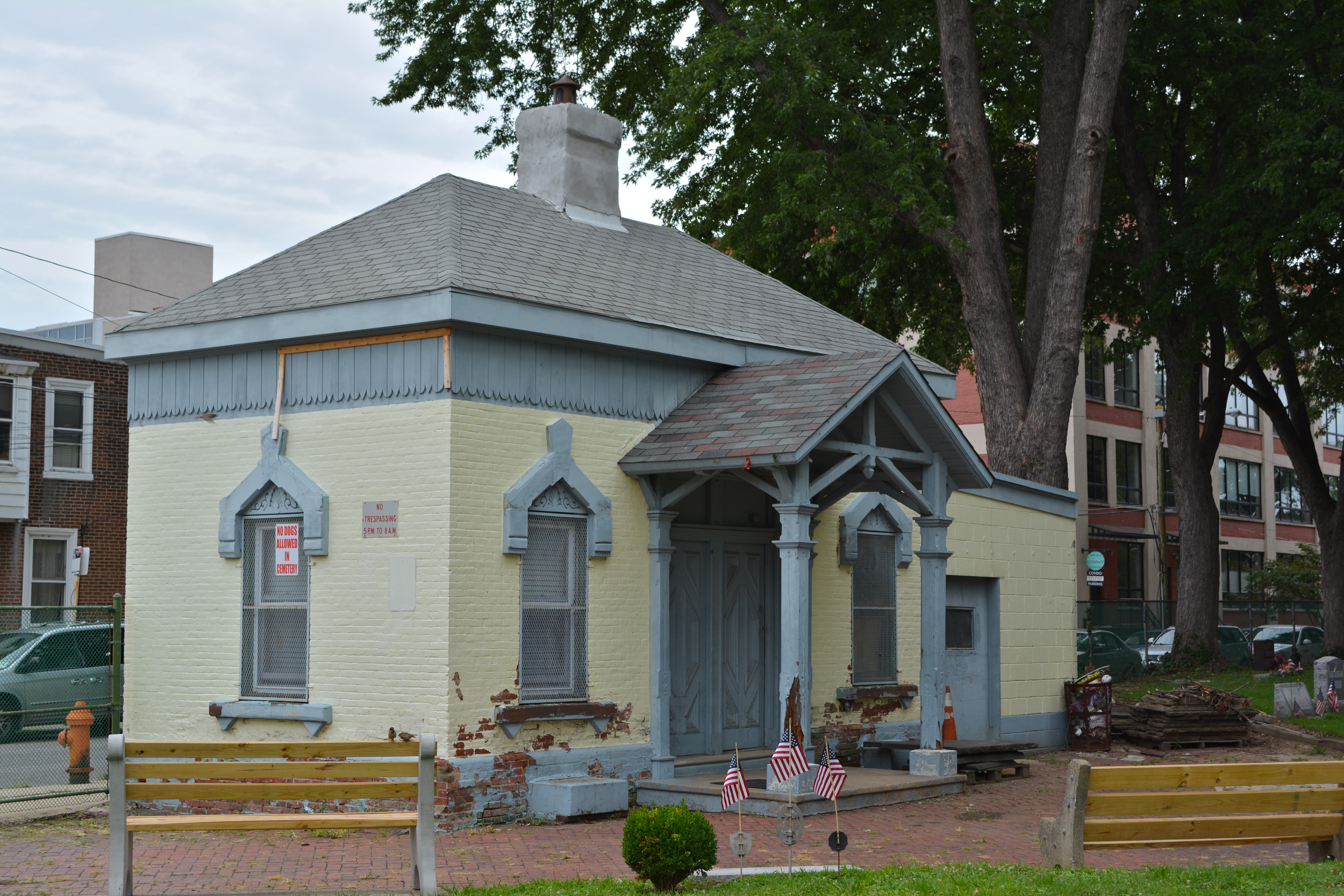
Palmer Cemetery gatehouse

Kensington was founded by Captain Anthony Palmer, an Englishman by way of Barbados. Using proceeds from the sale of the Hope Farm estate (present day Port Richmond), which included three slaves named Abraham, Hannibal, and Phillis, Palmer purchased the Fairman Estate in 1729 and laid out his town and sold parcels to the local fishermen and shipbuilders. Anthony Palmer eventually became active in the provincial council and became acting Governor of Pennsylvania in 1747–1748. Palmer died in 1749 and was buried in Christ Church Cemetery in Philadelphia. (The Kensington Burial Grounds in Fishtown, also known as Palmer Cemetery, was founded around 1732 and is still an active burial ground, situated on land deeded to the community by the Palmer Family after Anthony Palmer's death. It is believed that the cemetery was in use from about the time Palmer started to lay out the town of Kensington, but the actual date of the first burial is unknown.)

Within a few generations there was another influx of German immigrants, then still later in the late 19th century Polish and Irish Catholic immigrants. The community had two Roman Catholic Churches, St. Laurentius, built by Polish immigrants, and the Holy Name of Jesus, built predominantly by Irish immigrants. Holy Name continues to serve as the parish church. St. Laurentius was sold to private developers and was to be turned into apartments, but became embroiled in legal disputes for years. Meanwhile, the structure deteriorated, leading to its eventual demolition beginning in 2022.

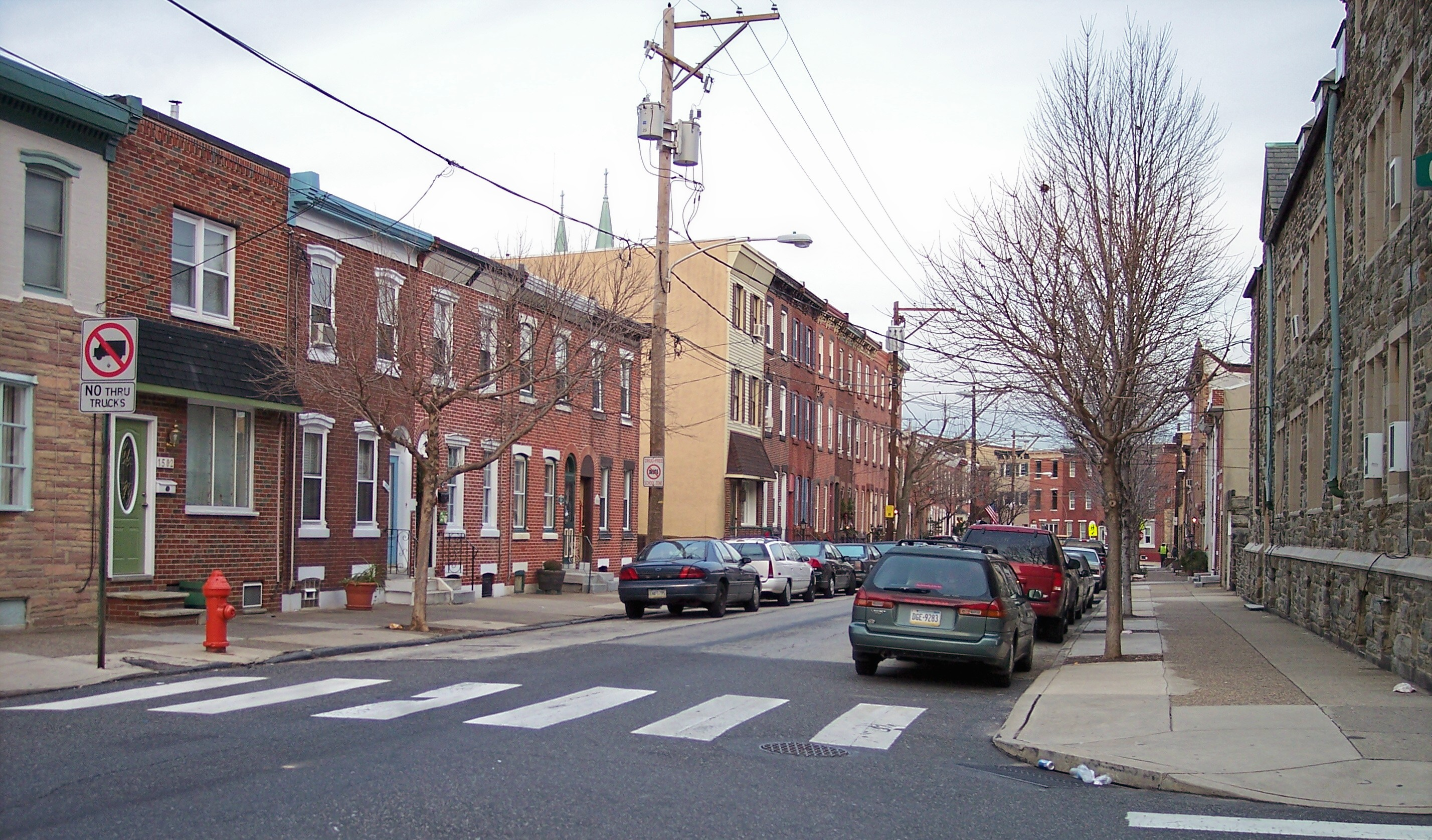
1500 block of E. Berks Street, a typical residential street in Fishtown, in 2007.

The neighborhood had been working class for centuries; while poverty grew after jobs left during the deindustrialization era, which afflicted many "rust belt" cities, Fishtown's workers continued to maintain a stable working-class community. Fishtown was highly segregated in the mid-20th century: between 1950 and 1970, only 0.1-0.2% of the population was not white. Most long-time residents trace their ancestry to Irish, German, and Polish Catholic immigrants. In an analysis of 2013 data, Fishtown was the third most segregated white neighborhood in Philadelphia (after Girard Estates and Bridesburg), with 96% white residents. By 2024, the percentage of white residents had decreased further to 86%.

Since 2005 Fishtown has experienced moderate gentrification characterized by significant rises in housing prices and the opening of upscale art, entertainment, and dining establishments. An influx of artists and professionals has joined the ranks of police officers, fire fighters, nurses, carpenters, electricians, stonemasons, plumbers, sheet-metal workers, and teamsters. As of 2023, the neighborhood was one of the highest-income areas in Philadelphia, with a median household income of over $110,000.

The neighborhood was chosen by the state of Pennsylvania to be the site of the Rivers Casino Philadelphia gaming complex on Delaware Avenue near Frankford Avenue. This choice deeply divided the neighborhood, causing conflict between those who believe it will bring jobs and economic development and those who believe it will lead to increased crime, addiction, and other social problems which negatively impact quality of life. A Community Benefits Agreement was reached between SugarHouse Casino (now Rivers Casino) and the membership of Fishtown Action and the New Kensington CDC, which will provide money for community projects that would not otherwise be available to the residents.

== Landmarks ==
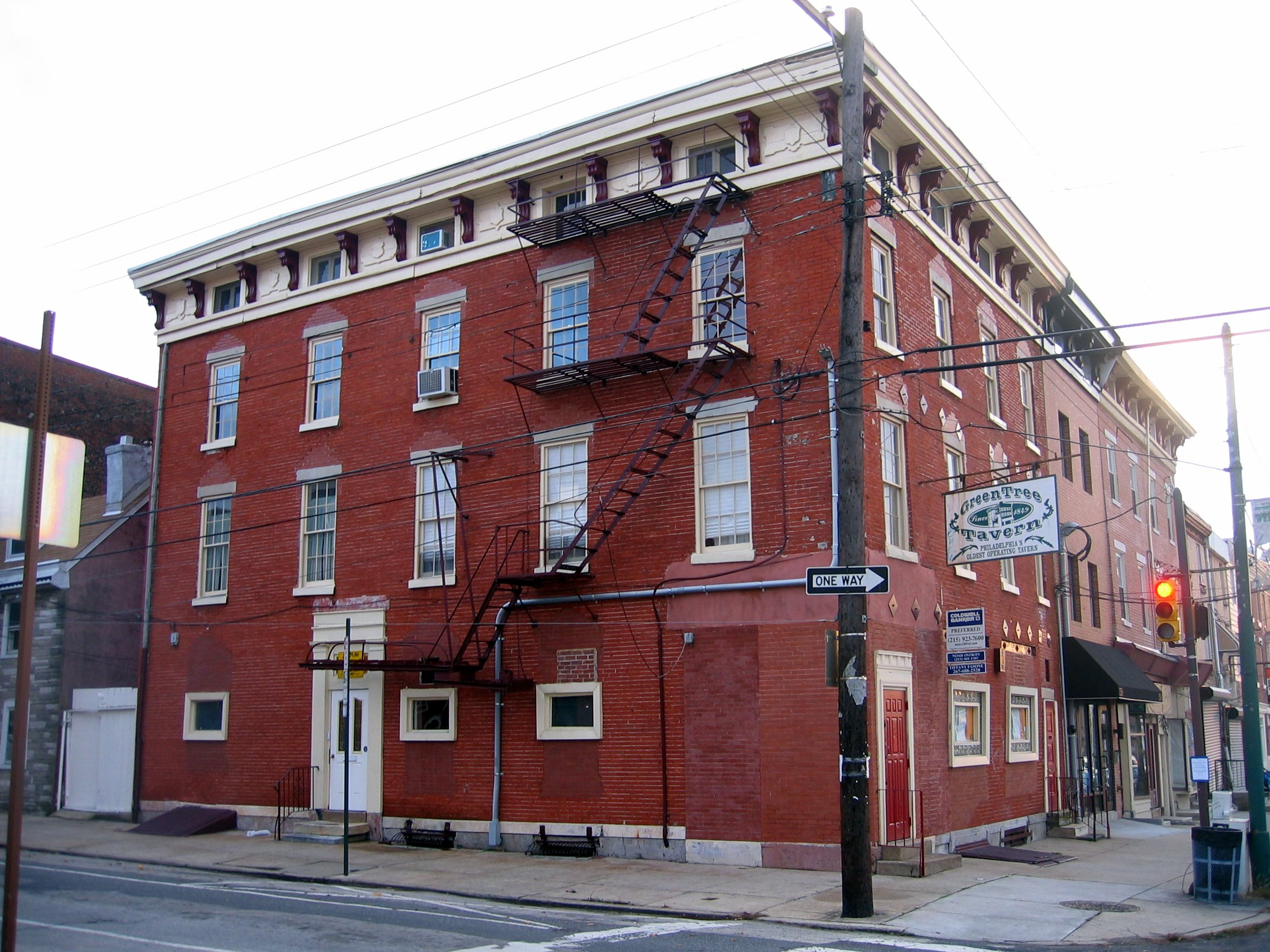
Green Tree Tavern

The George Chandler School, Green Tree Tavern, and Penn Treaty Junior High School are listed on the National Register of Historic Places.

Listed in the Philadelphia Register of Historic Places, the following buildings are protected by the City of Philadelphia and the Philadelphia Historical Commission:

- Bradlee & Co.'s Empire Chain Works, 1615-31 N. Delaware Avenue (1905–10)
- The Edward Corner Warehouse, 1100-02 N. Delaware Avenue (1921).
- The Frederick J. Rapp House, 1003 Frankford Avenue (c. 1786).
- The Fifth Dutch Reformed Church, 2345-49 East Susquehanna Avenue (c. 1863).
- The Jacob Souder Frame Dwelling, 1132 Marlborough Street (c. 1810).
- The Joseph Paxson Frame Store & Dwelling, 1250 E. Palmer Street (ca.1827).
- The Morse Elevator Company, 1101-03 Frankford Avenue.
- The Morse Elevator Company, 1105-09 Frankford Avenue.
- The Morse Elevator Company, 1111-17 Frankford Avenue.
- The Otis Elevator Company's Boiler & Engine House, 1045-49 Sarah Street (1904).
- The Penn Asylum for Indigent Widows & Single Women (aka The Penn Home), 1401 Susquehanna Avenue (c. 1769).
- 10th District Patrol House & Stable, 1416-22 Frankford Avenue (1891–92)

== Education ==
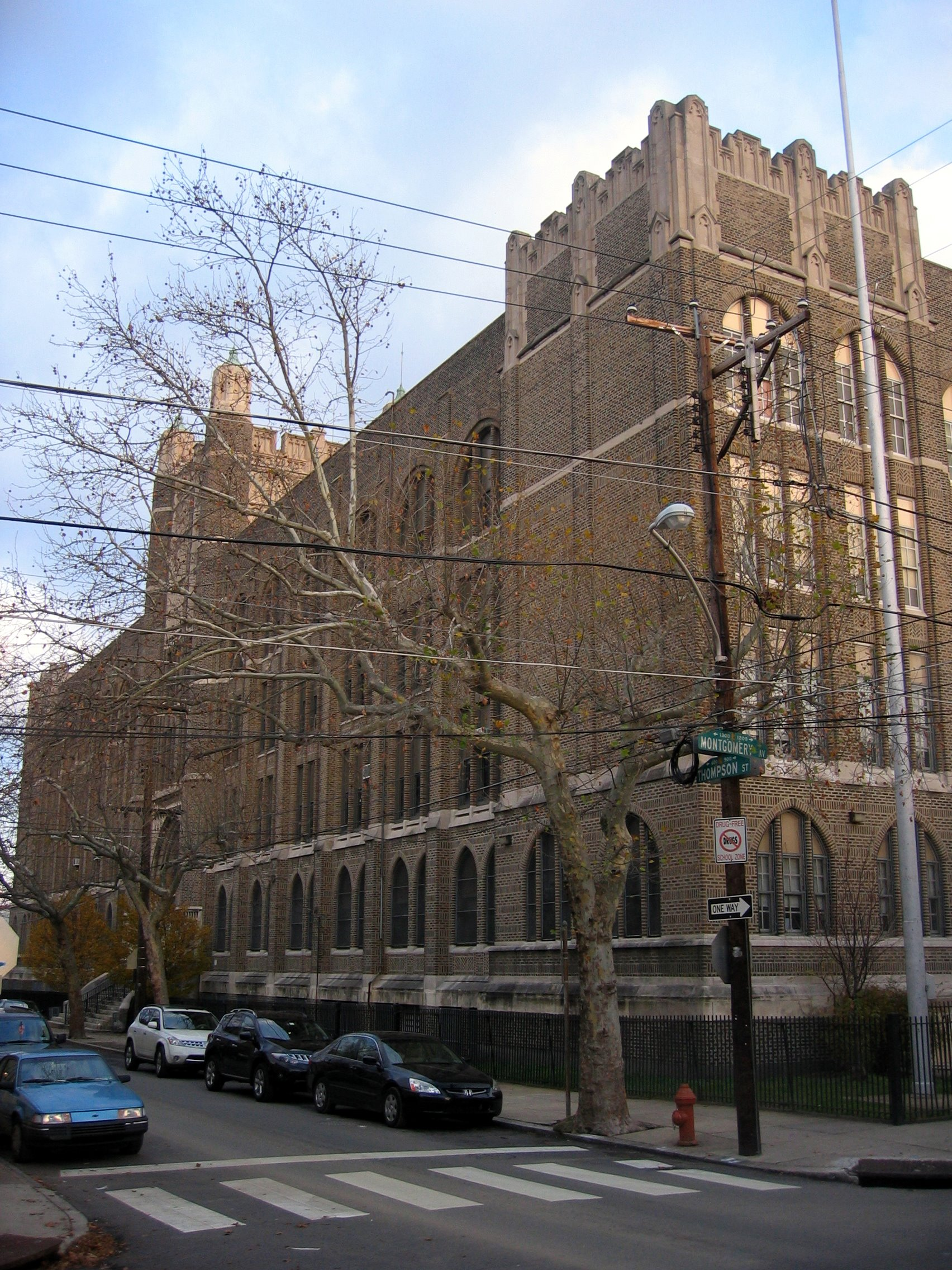
Penn Treaty School

The School District of Philadelphia operates public schools. Alexander Adaire School is the elementary school of the community. Penn Treaty School (formerly Penn Treaty Middle School), grades 6–12, is in Fishtown. Residents were previously zoned to Kensington High School.

St. Laurentius School is located in Fishtown.

== In popular culture ==
In the book Coming Apart: The State of White America, 1960–2010 (2012), Charles Murray names an imagined entity of white working class decay for Fishtown, inspired by Fishtown, Philadelphia.

The comic book Fishtown (2007–2008), by Kevin Colden, portrays a murder that occurred in Fishtown, based on the 2003 murder of Jason Sweeney.

The neighborhood was partially filmed in and is a focal point in several episodes of the 2020 AMC television series Dispatches from Elsewhere, created by and starring Jason Segel.

Season 5 of Netflix's reboot series Queer Eye was shot in Philadelphia. Fishtown was the primary recording location for episode 1 "Preaching Out Loud".

== See also ==
- List of Philadelphia neighborhoods
