= Murder of Jason Sweeney =

2003 murder in Pennsylvania, United States

Jason Sweeney
- Jason Sweeney c. 2003
- Born: Jason Keel Sweeney; July 29, 1986; Fishtown, Philadelphia, Pennsylvania, U.S.
- Died: May 30, 2003 (age 16); Fishtown, Philadelphia, Pennsylvania, U.S.
- Cause of death: Murder
- Occupation(s): High school student, Construction worker
- Parent(s): Paul and Dawn Sweeney

Jason Keel Sweeney (July 29, 1986 – May 30, 2003) was a construction worker from Fishtown, Philadelphia, Pennsylvania, who at the age of 16 was murdered by four teenagers for his paycheck on May 30, 2003. The perpetrators included a girl he was dating and his best friend since childhood. Due to the manner in which Sweeney was murdered, the ages of the teens involved, and the seeming indifference of the perpetrators, the crime received national media coverage.

== Murder ==
Jason Sweeney left school and was working for his father, a contractor, on a building project in Philadelphia. He recently met a girl he liked, 15-year-old Justina Morley, with whom he had a date on the evening of Friday, May 30, 2003. Unbeknownst to Sweeney, Morley engaged in sexual relations with two other 16-year-olds, Nicholas Coia and Edward Batzig Jr. Batzig was Sweeney's best friend since the fourth grade. Nicholas Coia and his 17-year-old brother, Domenic Coia, (Note: Coia’s given name has reported as both Domenic and Dominic. The Pennsylvania Department of Corrections as well as a civil lawsuit filed in a federal court identify him as Dominic, with the latter also identifying his father as Dominic Sr. Coia himself in his autobiography writes his name as Domenic) were also friends with Sweeney, but the brothers later ended the friendship.

With the promise of sex, Morley lured Sweeney to "The Trails," a wooded area of Fishtown near the Delaware River, where Batzig and the Coia brothers were lying in wait. Batzig struck the first blow, hitting Sweeney in the head four or five times. Batzig and the Coia brothers then pummeled Sweeney, primarily on his head and face, with a hatchet, a hammer and a rock until he was dead. Batzig later told a detective how he hit Sweeney with the hatchet four or five times. Batzig said, "Jason started begging for his life, but we just kept hitting him." Batzig also said that Sweeney looked at him during the beating and said, “Please stop, I'm bleeding," after which Batzig hit Sweeney again with the axe. They finished by dropping a boulder on the right side of his head. Sweeney's head was crushed and the only bone left undamaged was his left cheekbone. He was identified by a cut on his hand that he sustained at his construction job.

Following Sweeney's murder, the four assailants stole the $500 cash he earned from work. Before leaving the crime scene, the Coias, Batzig and Morley shared a group hug and split the money, which they used to buy jewelry and illegal drugs—heroin, marijuana, and Xanax—and then "partied beyond redemption," according to Domenic.

Domenic Coia confessed in a court hearing that they were all involved in the murder of Sweeney. The police said the murder was planned days before. Part of the preparation of the murder was listening to the Beatles song "Helter Skelter" over forty times, prompting later news coverage to draw a parallel to the Manson family murders. Joshua Staab, 18, a friend of Domenic Coia, said that the group bragged about their plan to kill Sweeney by using Justina Morley as "bait." Staab also said that Batzig knew that Sweeney would have his paycheck earnings on him on the day of the murder. The prosecutor asked Staab about the teens' demeanor after the killing. Staab said, "They seemed pretty fine. In a way, happy."

Although all four teens involved in the murder were drug addicts, they were not high before they murdered Sweeney. In response to a detective's question about whether they were high during the killing, Domenic Coia answered, "No, I was as sober as I am now. It is sick, isn't it?" A detective involved in the case and a forensic psychologist later opined that the killers' motivation went beyond robbery and stemmed from envy and resentment of Sweeney's relative success in life.

In his memoir, Domenic Coia gave a different account of the murder. Domenic claimed he panicked when Batzig actually hit Sweeney and only participated when he feared him and his brother getting caught. He also denies stating he was sober during the attack and states he later prevented them from killing Justina Morley as they feared she would testify. He also denies involvement in any plans for the murder before the day it happened.

== Justina Morley ==
Justina Morley claimed that she started smoking marijuana at the age of 10, and shortly thereafter started taking prescription pills and snorting cocaine. April Frederick, Morley's mother, said her daughter started cutting her wrists at the age of 10. Morley was hospitalized for threatening suicide and self-mutilation in 2002. She was once admitted to Friends Hospital for cutting her wrists, knees and thighs, taking pills and displaying a suicide poem, which she penned on her door. Morley told her mother that she would commit suicide if her mother did not take her out of the hospital; her mother then took her out against the hospital's advice. Morley was expelled from public school in the eighth grade, which she then repeated at the private Holy Name of Jesus Catholic school in Fishtown.

A psychiatrist hired by the defense team, William Russell, said the reason Morley began sexual activity at an early age "was an attempt at validation of self-worth". Morley testified that she had sex with both Nicholas Coia and Batzig in exchange for heroin just a few days before they murdered Sweeney. Morley was released on December 20, 2020.

== Trial ==
Justina Morley's attorneys explained to the judge that the girl suffered through depression, suicide attempts, and substance abuse in order to get her a juvenile court trial. Psychiatrist William Russell explained to the court how Morley attempted suicide twice by overdosing on pills only the year before the killing. Morley's attorney argued she was the least culpable and if tried as a juvenile, she could get treatment and live a productive life. The Assistant District Attorney argued that Morley was an important part of the plot in Sweeney's murder and she had treatment before, to no avail. If tried in a juvenile court, Morley could have been free of court supervision by the age of 21. The judge agreed with the prosecution and ordered her to be tried as an adult for murder. At that point, Morley plead guilty to third-degree murder in exchange for her testimony against other defendants, and was sentenced to 17 1/2 to 35 years in prison. She was released in December 2020, and is currently on parole.

Domenic Coia, Nicholas Coia, and Edward Batzig Jr. were charged with first-degree murder, conspiracy, robbery and possessing an instrument of crime. All were tried together as adults. In 2004, prosecutors decided not to seek the death penalty against Batzig and Nicholas Coia, but planned to seek it against Domenic Coia. However, during the trial, the U.S. Supreme Court ruled in Roper v. Simmons that defendants under the age of 18 could not be executed. As a result, Domenic Coia, who was 14 days away from his 18th birthday at the time of the crime, could not receive the death penalty. Therefore, the Coia brothers and Batzig all faced mandatory life sentences without parole if convicted of first-degree murder.

Jailhouse letters of the defendants were read during the trial to understand their behavior and to determine who, if anyone, was the most culpable. Defense counsel for the Coias and Batzig argued that Morley was the instigator and led the boys to commit the murder of Sweeney. In one of her writings to Domenic Coia, she wrote: "So you say I'm manipulative, and yes, I believe I am in ways. I'm persuasively manipulative, and I think I'm pretty good at it, too. I enjoy dragging people along." She went on to say: "...tell me you don't enjoy these gullible humans. It's funny how easy it is to persuade them into lies." She also wrote to Domenic Coia, "I'm a cold-blooded [expletive] death-worshiping bitch who survives by feeding off the weak and lonely. I lure them, and then I crush them." Expressing no remorse at all in one letter, she stated: "I am guilty. But I still don't feel guilty for anything... I still enjoy my flashbacks. They give me comfort. I love them." However, Morley testified that she did feel remorse for the slaying of Sweeney and that she only wrote such things so that she would be accepted by the Coias and Batzig. The prosecution, while acknowledging that Morley's letters showed her to be "a cold-blooded killer", nevertheless used her letters to demonstrate the depravity of the group.

The defense attorneys for the Coias and Batzig also contended that their clients, being drug addicts, lacked the intent to kill needed to support a first-degree murder conviction, and at most committed the lesser crime of third-degree murder. However, this strategy was undermined by the confessions of the three defendants. Assistant District Attorney Jude Conroy read part of Domenic Coia's confession in court: "We just kept hitting and hitting him. ... We took Sweeney's wallet and split up the money, and we partied beyond redemption." Domenic Coia had also told a detective: "It was like we were all happy [with] what we did."

== Verdict and sentencing ==
The Coia brothers and Batzig were convicted on charges of first-degree murder, conspiracy, robbery and possession of an instrument of crime. In May 2005, all were sentenced to mandatory life in prison without parole for murder, plus 22 1/2 to 45 years for conspiracy, robbery and possessing an instrument of crime.

None of the teens showed any remorse or apologized for the murder. Paul Sweeney, the victim's father, addressed Domenic Coia, saying, "Look at me, Domenic. I know you think you have evil eyes but mine are going to be staring back at you every night for the rest of your life." Domenic Coia responded to the judge upon asking if he would like to be heard, "I never thought I had evil eyes. But other than that, I'm cool," something that would later be misquoted to make him look worse, according to Coia in his memoir, Biological Juvenile. The judge, in denying defense counsel's motion for a sentence that could allow for parole, said: "There is a level of inhumanity that exists in these facts. This was a totally depraved act."

== Resentencing ==
In 2012, the Supreme Court in Miller v. Alabama struck down mandatory life without parole sentences for juveniles under 18, holding that the court must consider the individual circumstances of each juvenile defendant in determining sentence — which might still be life without parole if, in the court's judgment, the circumstances warrant it. The Supreme Court left open the question of whether Miller applied retroactively to trigger resentencing of all juveniles who were already sentenced, leaving this to the decision of individual state courts and legislatures. In Pennsylvania, where the Coias and Batzig were sentenced, the state supreme court ruled in 2013 not to apply Miller retroactively, thus upholding the mandatory life sentences of juveniles whose sentences were already final at the time of the Supreme Court ruling. However, the state supreme court also ruled (in a different case) that juveniles sentenced to mandatory life without parole whose sentences were not yet final at the time of Miller were entitled to a resentencing hearing considering their individual circumstances, at which they could receive a sentence of life without parole, or life with the possibility of parole after a minimum term. Batzig and Nicholas Coia, who both had appeals pending at the time of Miller, were granted such resentencing hearings.

At Nicholas Coia's resentencing hearing on February 19, 2015, Common Pleas Judge Sandy L. V. Byrd sentenced him to life in prison without the possibility of parole, upholding the original 2005 sentence. Byrd noted, "This is an uncommon case, there are no factors which remove the defendant from the punishment of life in prison without parole," Byrd said. "Not only did he plan the assault, but he participated in the assault which was so violent that Jason Sweeney had to be identified with dental records."

== Memorial foundation ==
Paul and Dawn Sweeney, Jason Sweeney's parents, set up the Jason Keel Sweeney Foundation, in memory of their son, to fund a full scholarship for the Valley Forge Military Academy and College, the school of their son's dreams. Jason Sweeney had wanted to attend the military school to become a Navy SEAL. He was accepted into the school, but could not afford the tuition.

== In popular culture ==
A 2003 episode of CSI: Crime Scene Investigation titled "Coming of Rage" (Season 4, Episode 10) is based on the crime.

The crime inspired comic artist Kevin Colden's 2008 graphic novel Fishtown, which was nominated for an Eisner Award.

A 2012 episode of the Lifetime Movie Network series Killer Kids titled "Foul Ball and Framed" detailed the murder, including actual footage from the crime scene, in the second segment of the episode ("Framed").

In 2013, Domenic Coia wrote a memoir of his life and the murder, titled Biological Juvenile. It was subsequently posted in PDF form on the website prisonsfoundation.org. In the memoir, he expresses remorse for his actions, explains why he did not apologize during the final trial, criticizes the law system in the US, gives full context of what he did say at the trial and to detectives, and apologizes to both his family and the Sweeney family.

An episode of Murder Among Friends, titled '"Friend Fatale," on Investigation Discovery profiled the murder of Jason Sweeney on May 17, 2016, less than two weeks before the 13th anniversary of Sweeney's death.

The murder was covered in Season 1, Episode 3 of Deadliest Kids, titled "The Murder of Jason Sweeney" and aired in 2021.
