= Third Avenue station =

Third Avenue station may refer to the following subway stations in New York, United States:

- Third Avenue station (BMT Canarsie Line)
- Third Avenue–138th Street station
- Third Avenue–149th Street station

== See also ==
- Third Avenue (disambiguation)
