= 3rd Street station =

3rd Street station or Third Street station may refer to:

- Third Street station (Miami), a Miami Metromover station
- Third Street/Convention Center station, a LYNX rapid transit station in Charlotte
- Mill Avenue/3rd Street station, a METRO Light Rail station in Tempe, Arizona
- 3rd Street/Jefferson and 3rd Street/Washington stations in Phoenix
- 3 Street Southwest station, a C-Train station in Calgary
- 3rd Street station (DC Streetcar), a streetcar stop in Washington, D.C.
- Third Street station (BMT Fifth Avenue Line), a demolished station on the BMT Fifth Avenue Line
- the Western Pacific Depot, a disused station in Oakland, California

== See also ==
- 3rd Street (disambiguation)
- Third Street Light Rail Project
