= N3RD Street =

N3RD Street North 3rd Street
- Neighborhood of Philadelphia
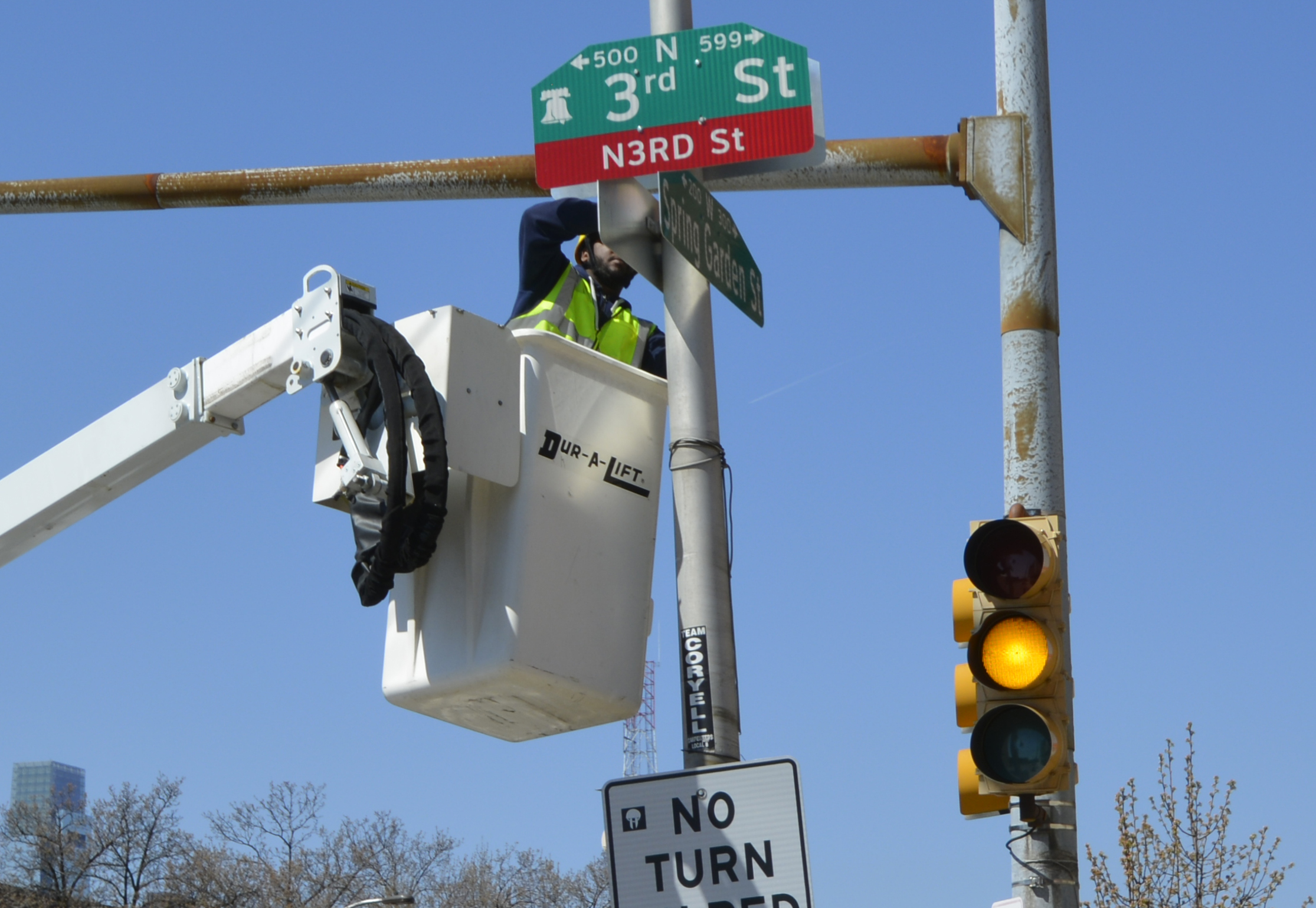
- City worker installing a “N3RD St” sign at the intersection with Spring Garden Street

- Location within Philadelphia
- Country: United States
- State: Pennsylvania
- County: Philadelphia
- City: Philadelphia
- Area codes: 215, 267 and 445

N3RD Street (also N3rd Street, N3RD St, Nerd Street) is a nickname for a segment of North 3rd Street in Philadelphia, Pennsylvania, United States, between Market Street and Girard Avenue (spanning across the neighborhoods of Old City and Northern Liberties), and its surrounding community that is home to a concentration of "nerdy" companies and spaces; "N3RD" is a double entendre as both leet for "nerd" and reflecting the "N. 3rd St." of postal addresses.

An official resolution recognizing N3RD Street was written by Indy Hall founder Alex Hillman and adopted by Philadelphia's city council on March 20, 2014. Starting April 10, 2014, the city installed special street signs along the corridor denoting its nickname, similar to the neighborhood-specific signs on the Avenue of the Arts, Avenue of Technology, Mummers Row, Fabric Row, French Quarter, Chinatown, and the Gayborhood.

The official city naming ceremony took place on April 11, 2014, at Liberty Lands Park.
