= Indy Hall =

Philadelphia coworking space

Coordinates: 39°57′44″N 75°8′27″W

Indy Hall is a coworking community with an international online membership and a communal space based in the Northern Liberties neighborhood of Philadelphia. It was originally founded in late 2006, in the Old City neighborhood of Philadelphia, by Alex Hillman and Geoff DiMasi, making it one of the oldest independent coworking spaces in the United States and the oldest coworking space in the city of Philadelphia. Early member Lauren Galanter suggested the name "Independents Hall."

== History ==
- September 2006 – Alex Hillman first shares coworking concept at a Barcamp-style event for creatives and entrepreneurs. Fellow attendee Lauren Galanter suggests the name "Independents Hall", both a wordplay on the historical Independence Hall in Old City, and to refer to a place for freelance workers to gather.
- March 2007 – Inaugural meetup to organize around establishing the first dedicated coworking space in Philadelphia.
- August 2007 – With 22 founding members, a lease is signed for an 1800 square foot loft in Old City Philadelphia.
- September 1, 2007 – Official grand opening.
- May 2009 – A new 4500 square foot coworking space is established on N3rd Street.
- May 2012 – Coworking space is expanded to 8000+ square feet to include the ground floor and multi-medium art gallery program.
- August 2013 – Indy Hall collaborates with local businesses to establish the N3rd Street Farmers Market.
- August 2016 – After 18 months of searching for a new home, coworking space is relocated to the 3rd floor of an Old City building owned by Colonial Penn.
- December 2017 – The first coworking-based Girl Scout Troop is established by Lansie Sylvia, Arielle Brousse and Joanna Leigh Simon.
- March 2020 – Covid 19 Pandemic forces the community entirely online.
- July 2021 – Officially closed space in Colonial Penn building.
- January 2022 – Reopened in the Northern Liberties neighborhood for members only in-person coworking.
