= George Chandler School =

- U.S. National Register of Historic Places
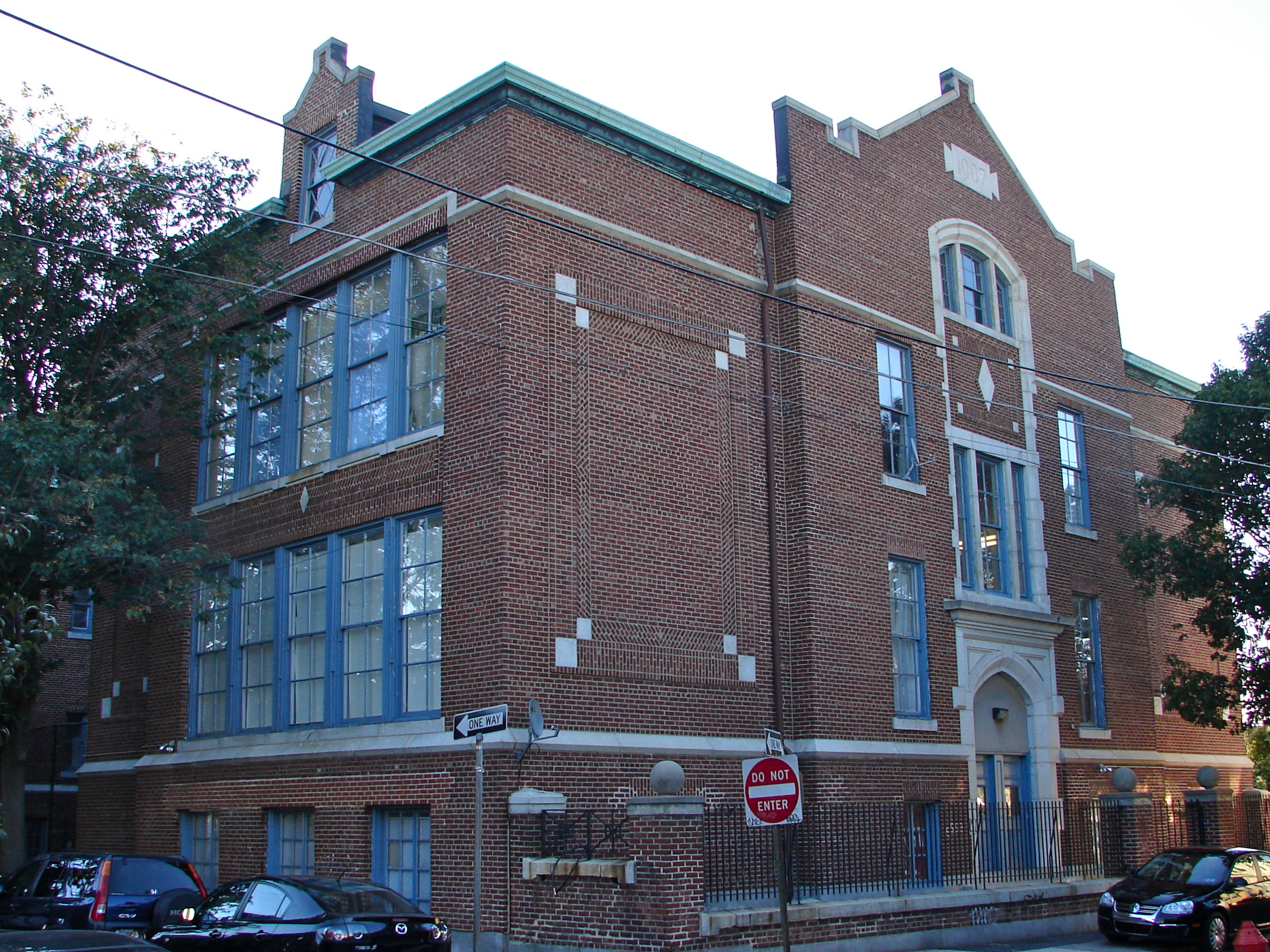
- George Chandler School, September 2010

- Location within Philadelphia Location within Pennsylvania Location within the United States
- Location: 1050 E. Montgomery St., Philadelphia, Pennsylvania
- Coordinates: 39°58′12″N 75°07′37″W
- Area: less than one acre
- Built: 1907-1908
- Built by: Reilly, Thomas
- Architect: Richards, Henry deCourcy
- Architectural style: Colonial Revival, Late Gothic Revival
- MPS: Philadelphia Public Schools TR
- NRHP reference No.: 88002255
- Added to NRHP: November 18, 1988

The George Chandler School is an historic school building which is located in the Fishtown neighborhood of Philadelphia, Pennsylvania.

It was added to the National Register of Historic Places in 1988.

== History and architectural features ==
Designed by Henry deCourcy Richards, the George Chandler School was built between 1907 and 1908. It is a two-and-one-half-story, U-shaped, brick building with a raised basement, which was designed in the Colonial Revival/Late Gothic Revival-style. It features stone trim and three large arched openings.
