= Green Tree Tavern =

- U.S. National Register of Historic Places
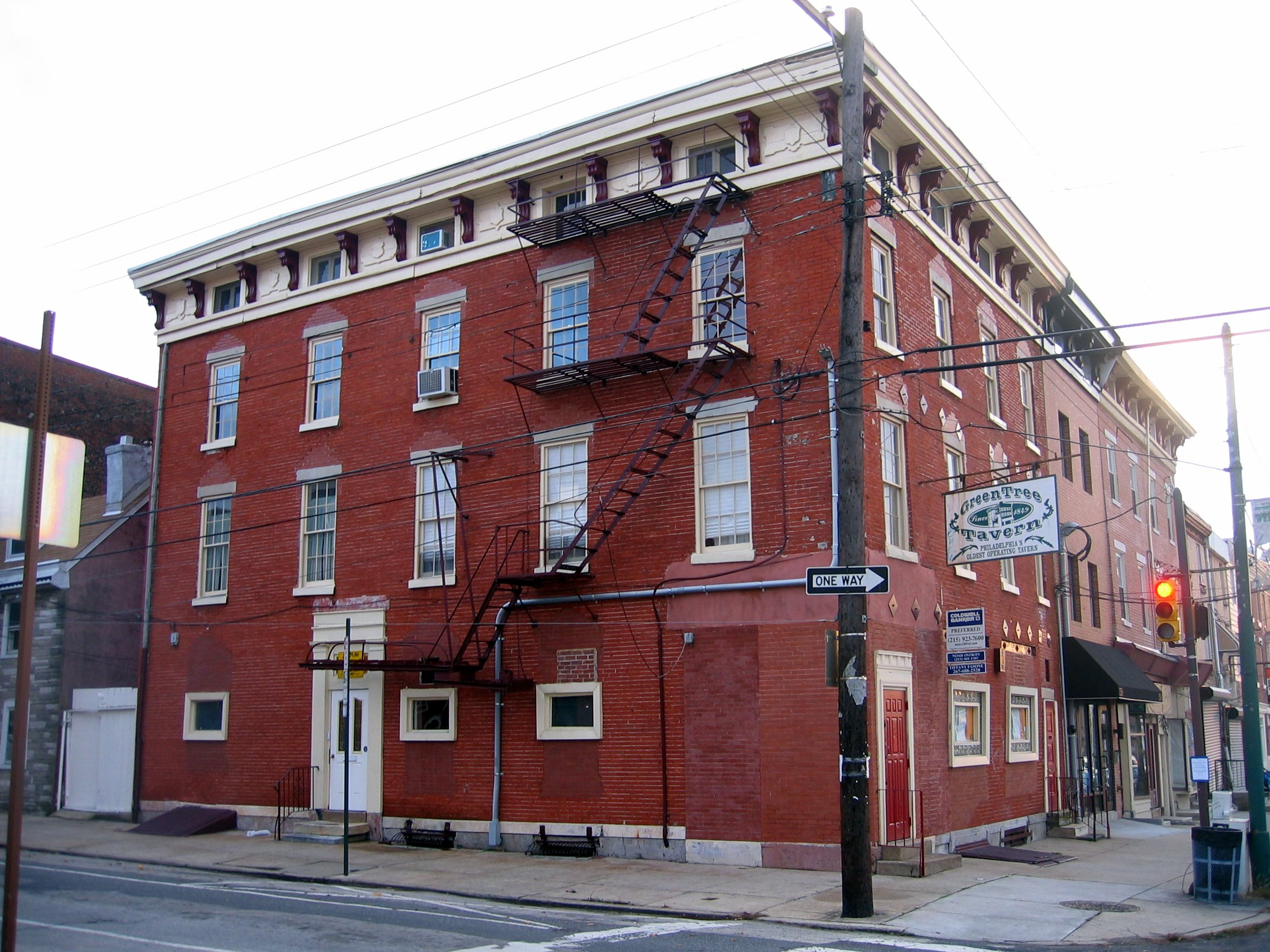

- Location within Philadelphia Location within Pennsylvania Location within the United States
- Location: 260–262 E. Girard Ave., Philadelphia, Pennsylvania
- Coordinates: 39°58′10″N 75°7′56″W
- Area: 0.1 acres (0.040 ha)
- Built: 1845
- Architect: Joseph Singerly
- NRHP reference No.: 80003612
- Added to NRHP: June 27, 1980

The Green Tree Tavern, also known as the Marlborough Inn, is a historic building in the Fishtown neighborhood of Philadelphia, Pennsylvania.

The building was added to the National Register of Historic Places in 1980.

The tavern had claimed to be the oldest operating tavern in Philadelphia, established in 1849, but is now closed. As of 2012, the property was occupied by a kick-boxing and martial arts studio.
