= Cathedral Park, Philadelphia =

Cathedral Park
- Neighborhood of Philadelphia
- Location within Philadelphia
- Country: United States
- State: Pennsylvania
- County: Philadelphia
- City: Philadelphia
- Area codes: 215, 267 and 445

Cathedral Park is a small neighborhood in the West Philadelphia section of Philadelphia, Pennsylvania, United States. Its boundaries are North 52nd Street to the west, West Girard Avenue and the Cathedral Cemetery to the south, and the SEPTA regional rail tracks to the north and east. Lancaster Avenue (US 30) passes through the eastern portion of the neighborhood, parallel to the SEPTA tracks. SEPTA’s 10 trolley serves the neighborhood via Lancaster Avenue. A prominent landmark in the neighborhood is the former St. Gregory Roman Catholic Church, located at North 52nd Street and Warren Street. Today, the Greater Bible Way Temple utilizes the building. Across the street from the former St. Gregory church, at the intersection of Media Street and North 52nd Street, is the former George Institute Branch Library of the Free Library of Philadelphia. On January 9, 2011, a fire destroyed the former St. Gregory Parochial School building. At the time of the fire, the building served as the home for the Global Leadership Academy Charter School.
