= Third Avenue Historic District =

Third Avenue Historic District may refer to:

- Third Avenue and North High Historic District, Columbus, Ohio, listed on the NRHP in Columbus, Ohio
- Third Avenue Historic District (Leavenworth, Kansas), listed on the NRHP in Leavenworth County, Kansas
- Third Avenue Historic District (Kenosha, Wisconsin)
- Third Avenue Historic District (Sturgeon Bay, Wisconsin)
