= Third Avenue Bridge =

The following bridges are named the Third Avenue Bridge:

- Third Avenue Bridge (New York City)
- Third Avenue Bridge (Minneapolis)
- Third Avenue Bridge (Fort Lauderdale)
