= Kensington High School (Philadelphia) =

- Kensington High School for Girls
- U.S. National Register of Historic Places
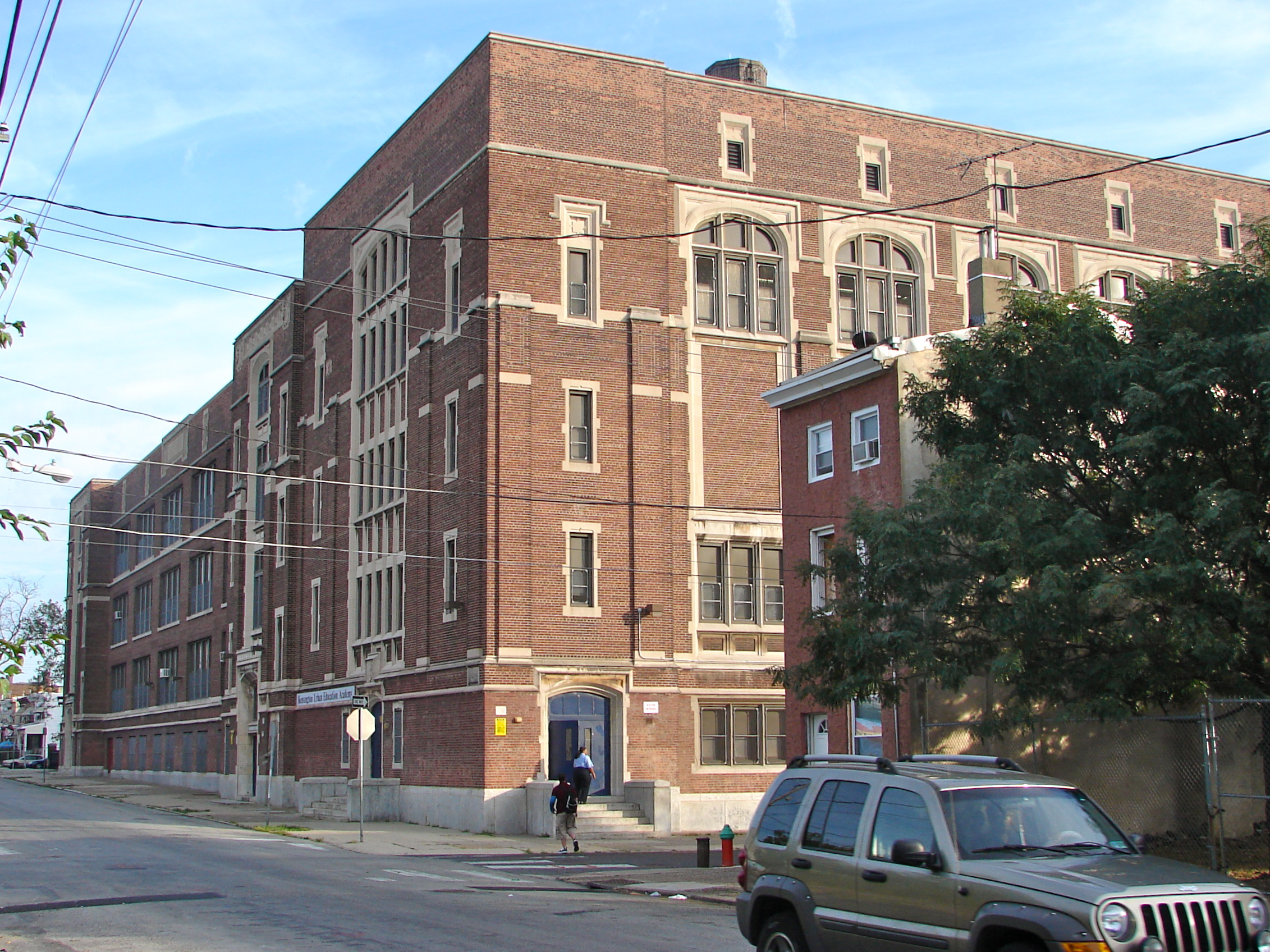
- Kensington High School for Girls, September 2010

- Location within Philadelphia Location within Pennsylvania Location within the United States
- Location: 2501 Coral St., Philadelphia, Pennsylvania, United States
- Coordinates: 39.9843°N 75.1264°W
- Area: 3 acres (1.2 ha)
- Built: 1916–1917
- Built by: Thomas Reilly
- Architect: Henry deCourcy Richards
- Architectural style: Tudor Revival
- Website: https://kensingtonhs.philasd.org/
- MPS: Philadelphia Public Schools TR
- NRHP reference No.: 88002288
- Added to NRHP: November 18, 1988

Kensington High School is a historic high school located in the Kensington neighborhood of Philadelphia, Pennsylvania, United States. It is part of the School District of Philadelphia.

The building was added to the National Register of Historic Places in 1988 as the Kensington High School for Girls.

== History and architectural features ==
This building was designed by Henry deCourcy Richards and built between 1916 and 1917. It is a 3 1/2-story, nine-bay by seven-bay, brick building that sits on a raised basement and was in the Tudor Revival style. It features limestone sills and lintels and a brick parapet.
