= George Herzog =

German-born American interior designer (1851-1920)

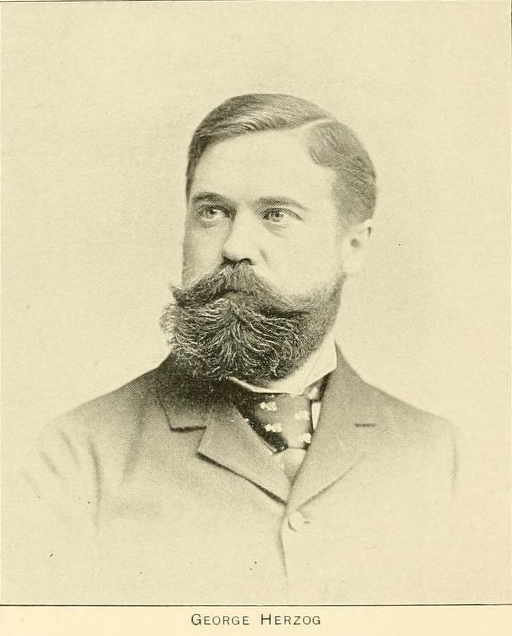
- Image from Philadelphia & Popular Philadelphians 1891
- Born: October 19, 1851
- Died: September 16, 1920 (aged 68)
- Resting place: West Laurel Hill Cemetery, Bala Cynwyd, Pennsylvania, U.S.
- Education: Royal Academy of Arts
- Occupations: interior designer, decorative painter
- Spouse(s): Harriet R. Herzog; Dorette M. Schmidt
- Children: 6

George Herzog (October 19, 1851 – September 16, 1920) was a German-born, American interior designer and decorative painter. He partnered with Otto and Konstantin Kaiser in a Philadelphia based decorating firm. He ran the business with Otto Kaiser after the death of Konstantin under the name Kaiser & Herzog and had offices in Philadelphia and New York City. He won two medals at the Centennial Exposition for his work and designed many private houses and public spaces.

== Early life and education ==
Herzog was born October 19, 1851, in Munich, Germany. In 1865, he trained under Joseph Schwarzmann. During Herzog's time in Schwarzmann's studio, Schwarzmann supervised the decoration of the palaces of Ludwig I of Bavaria. He graduated from the Royal Academy of Arts. His family immigrated to the United States in the 1870s.

== Career ==
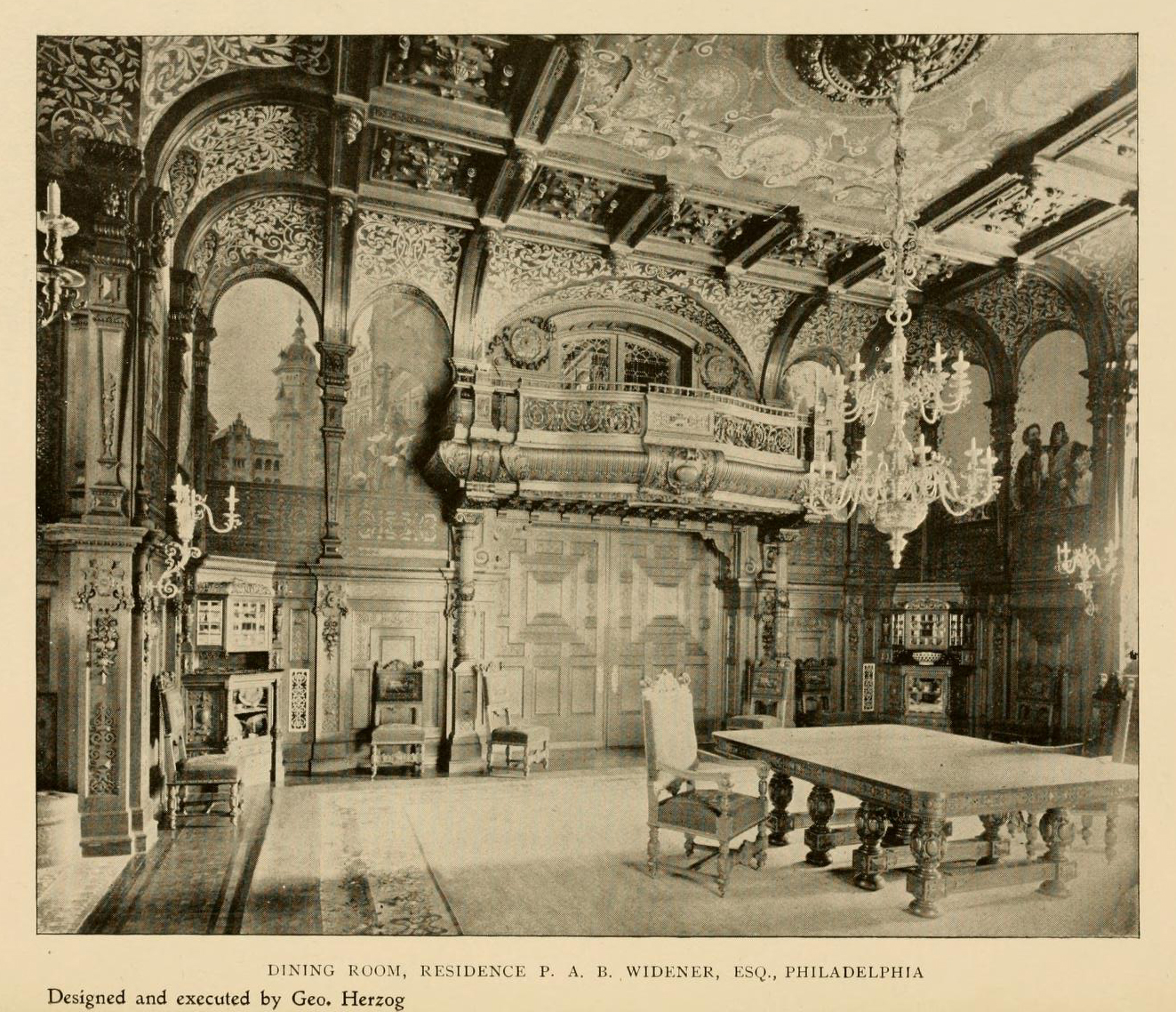
Dining room of the Peter A. B. Widener house, Philadelphia (1887).

He became a partner in the Philadelphia decorating firm of Otto & Konstantine Kaiser in 1873. The business was run by Herzog and Otto Kaiser after the death of Konstantine Kaiser in 1879 under the name Kaiser & Herzog. He became a United States citizen in 1882.

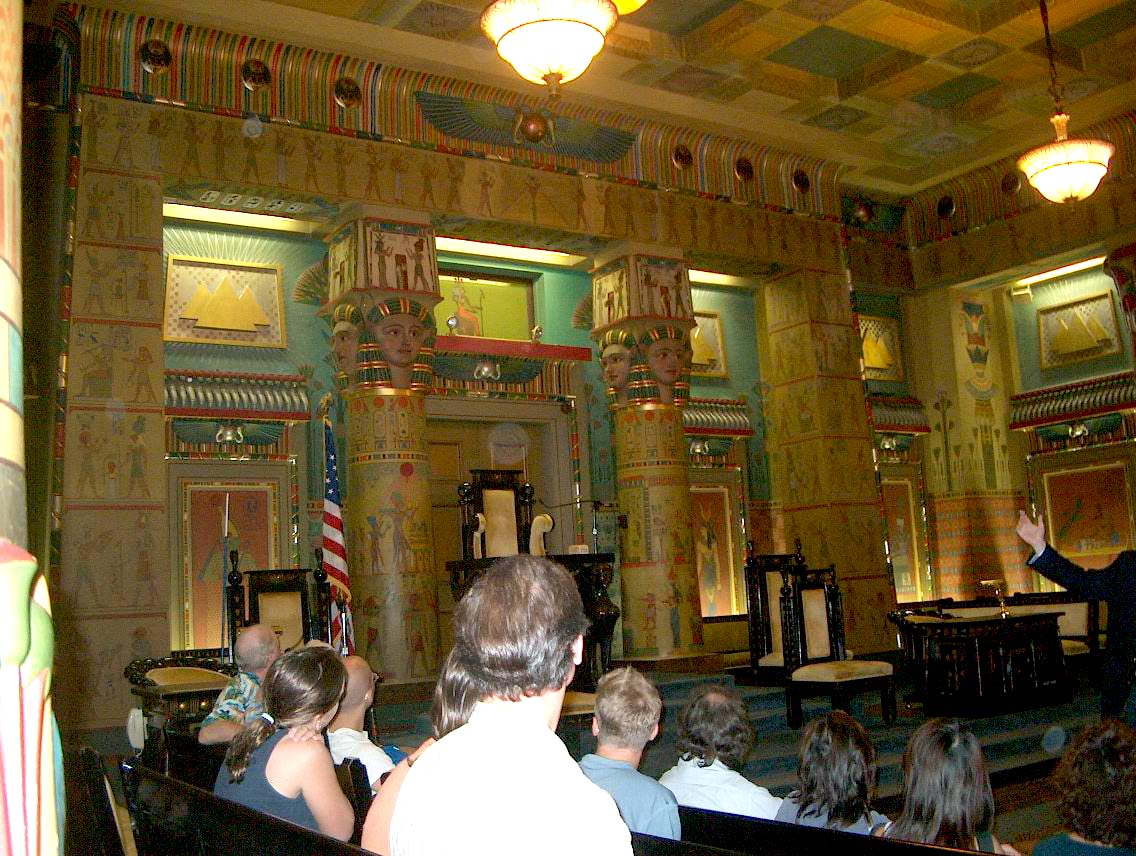
Egyptian Hall in the Masonic Temple in Philadelphia

He decorated the private houses of many well known individuals including William Lukens Elkins, Edwin H. Fitler, Charles Pratt, Jacob Schiff, and Peter Arrell Browne Widener. He also decorated many public buildings including the Academy of Music, the Liederkranz Society, St. James Church, and the Walnut Street Presbyterian Church. He designed the Egyptian, Ionic, and Norman Halls in the Masonic Temple in Philadelphia as well as the supreme court rooms and mayor's office in Philadelphia City Hall.

His work received two medals at the 1876 Centennial Exposition for the categories of furniture/upholestery/wooden-weave baskets and for plastic/graphic arts.

He opened an office in New York City and partnered with McKim, Mead & White and Herman J. Schwarzmann, the son of his mentor from school.

He specialized in ceiling and wall decoration, and sometimes oil portraiture. The goddesses playing musical instruments in the music room ceiling mural of Albert H. Disston's house may be portraits of the client's relatives. The wall murals in the dining room of industrialist Peter A. B. Widener's house featured portraits of the client's children in Renaissance garb looking down from a balcony.

Louis Comfort Tiffany formed Associated American Artists in 1879, assembling a team of artisans to create a comprehensive (if short-lived) design company. Perhaps in imitation, a team of Philadelphia artisans – Herzog (decorative painting and textiles), Charles F. Vollmer (furniture and cabinetry), Alfred Godwin (stained glass), J. E. McClees (art and imported goods), Sharpless & Watt (decorative tiles and metalwork) – joined in 1893 to form Associated Art Workers. They opened a designer showcase house at 1518 Chestnut Street, Philadelphia, but the company appears to have disbanded by 1895.

He died September 16, 1920, and was interred at West Laurel Hill Cemetery in Bala Cynwyd, Pennsylvania.

== Personal life ==
He married Harriet R. Herzog. They had one child together but were divorced in 1893. In 1896, he married Dorette M. Schmidt, and together they had five children.

== Legacy ==
The Masonic Library and Museum of Pennsylvania holds many of Herzog's original design plans and renderings for the Masonic Temple in Philadelphia. Collections of his architectural renderings are held at the Athenaeum of Philadelphia and the Carnegie Museum of Art in Pittsburgh, Pennsylvania.

== Selected projects ==
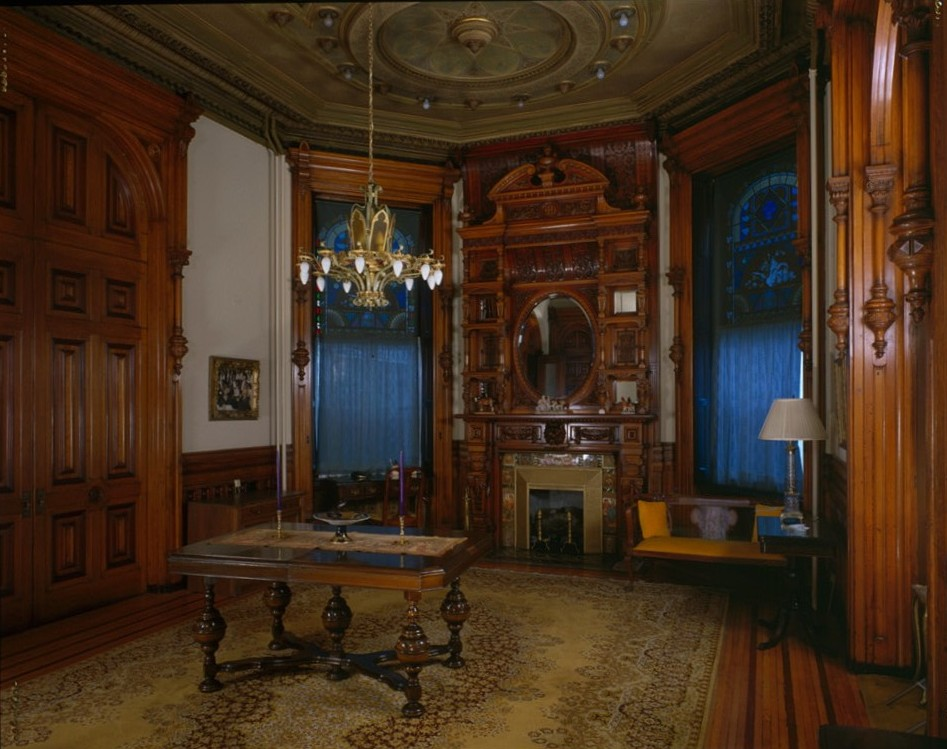
Diningroom of the Albert H. Disston house, Philadelphia (1881-82). Photo: HABS.

- Bank of North America, 305-07 Chestnut Street, Philadelphia, James H. & John T. Windrim, architects (1893–95, demolished 1972)
- Albert H. Disston house, 1530 North 16th Street, Philadelphia, Edwin Forrest Durang, architect (1881–82)
- Saint James Roman Catholic Church, 38th & Chestnut Streets, Philadelphia, Edwin Forrest Durang, architect (1881–87)
- Harmonie Club, 4 East 60th Street, New York City, McKim, Mead & White, architects (1906)
- Reuben O. Moon house, 1516 North 16th Street, Philadelphia (1884)
- Young Maennerchor Society Hall, 6th & Vine Streets, Philadelphia, Paul Bonner, architect (1889, demolished)
- Philadelphia City Hall, John McArthur Jr., architect. Mayor's Reception Room ceiling, Supreme Court Room, Judges' Consultation Room, Law Library, other work (1889–91)
- Philadelphia Masonic Temple, Broad Street, Philadelphia, James H. Windrim, architect. Egyptian Hall, Ionic Hall, Norman Hall, Corinthian Hall, Library and Museum, other work (1889–1903)
- Kemble Residence & Carriage House, 2201-05 Green Street, Philadelphia, James H. Windrim, architect (1890)
- William Lukens Elkins Mansion, 1218 North Broad Street, Philadelphia, William Powell, architect (1890, demolished)
- Keneseth Israel Temple, 1717 North Broad Street, Philadelphia, Oscar Frotscher & Louis Caron Hickman, architects (1891–92, demolished)
- Liederkranz Society, 111-19 East 58th Street, New York City, Hermann Schwarzmann, architect (1886, demolished 1964)
- "Beaumont" (William L. Austin mansion), 601 Ithan Avenue, Bryn Mawr, Pennsylvania, Baily & Truscott, architects (1901)
- Shelby County Courthouse, Adams Avenue, Memphis, Tennessee, James Gamble Rogers, architect (1905–10)
- Union League of Philadelphia, 140 South Broad Street, John Fraser, architect. Library ceiling, restaurant ceiling, banquet room, other work (1881–89)
- Peter A. B. Widener house, Broad Street & Girard Avenue, Philadelphia, Willis G. Hale, architect (1887, demolished 1980)
