= Jett Harrison =

American football player

St. Joseph's Hawks
- Position: Wide receiver
- Class: Junior

Personal information
- Listed height: 6 ft 1 in (1.85 m)
- Listed weight: 180 lb (82 kg)

Career information
- High school: St. Joseph's (Philadelphia, Pennsylvania)

Jett Harrison is an American football wide receiver for the St. Joseph's Hawks. He is currently committed to play college football for the Ohio State Buckeyes.

== Early life ==
Harrison attends St. Joseph's Preparatory School in Philadelphia, Pennsylvania. As a freshman, he recorded 51 receptions for 811 yards and 10 touchdowns. During his sophomore season, Harrison notched 50 receptions for 849 yards and 20 touchdowns.

He was rated as a five-star recruit and the top recruit in the class of 2028 by Rivals.com. He has received offers from schools such as Boston College, Duke, Nebraska, Ohio State, Oregon, Penn State, Syracuse, Tennessee, and Virginia Tech. Harrison committed to play college football for the Ohio State Buckeyes.

== Personal life ==
Harrison is the son of NFL Hall of Fame receiver Marvin Harrison and the younger brother of Houston Texans receiver Marvin Harrison Jr.
