= Hampden Firehouse =

- U.S. National Register of Historic Places
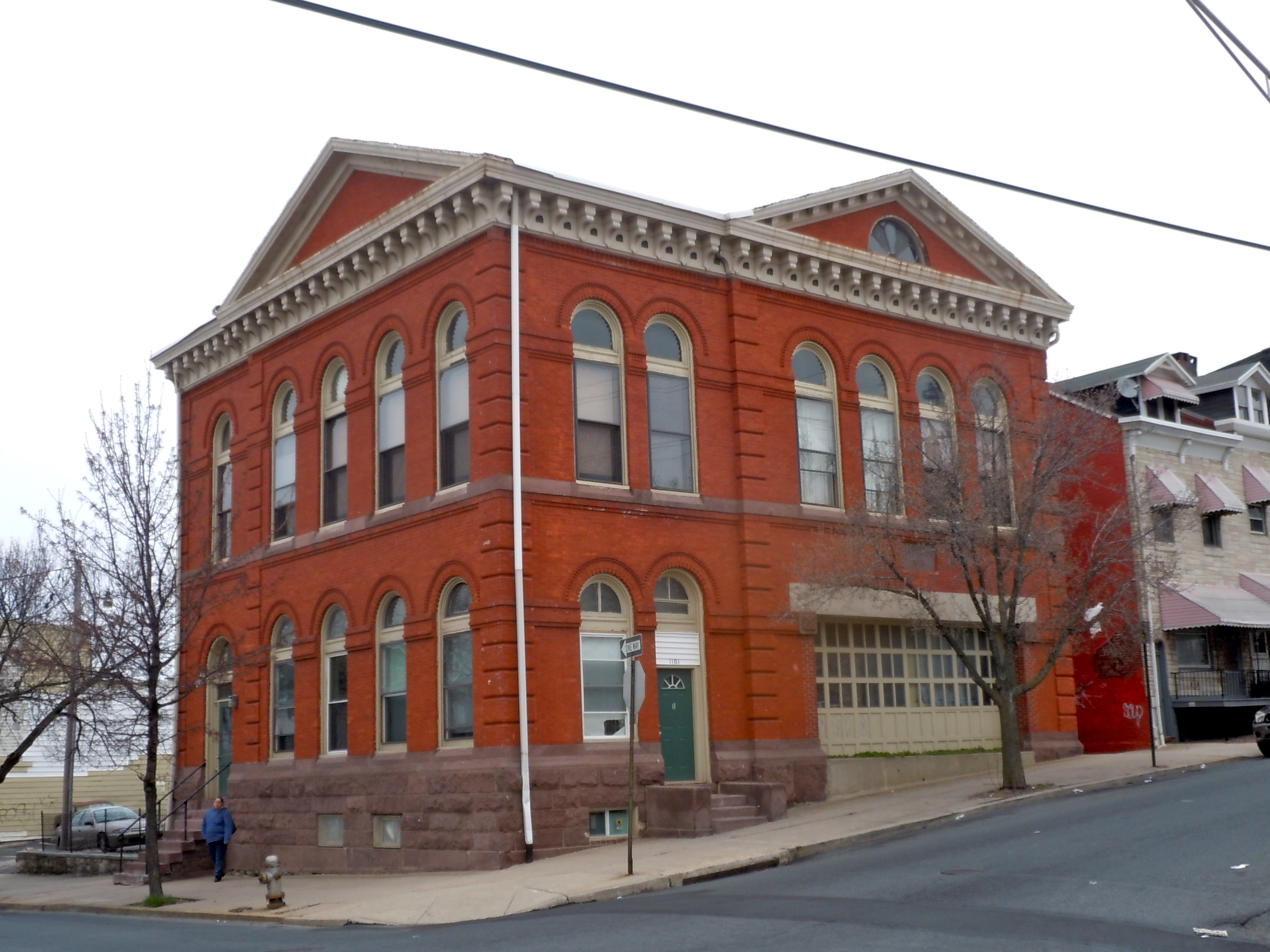
- Hampden Firehouse, March 2011

- Location within Pennsylvania Location within the United States
- Location: 1101 Greenwich Street, Reading, Pennsylvania
- Coordinates: 40°20′39″N 75°54′57″W
- Area: less than one acre
- Architect: Edwin F. Durang; Levi H. Focht, contractor
- Architectural style: Late Victorian, Renaissance, Greek Revival Influence
- NRHP reference No.: 82003761
- Added to NRHP: April 13, 1982

The Hampden Firehouse is an historic fire station which is located in Reading, Berks County, Pennsylvania.

It was listed on the National Register of Historic Places in 1982.

== History and architectural features ==
Built in 1887, this historic structure is a two-story, brick building which sits on a granite foundation. It was designed in the Renaissance Revival style by noted Philadelphia architect Edwin Forrest Durang (1829 – 1911), and features a double pedimented roof influenced by the Greek Revival style and round arched windows.

It was listed on the National Register of Historic Places in 1982.
