= St. Laurentius Parish (Philadelphia) =

- Saint Laurentius Interior
- St. Laurentius Parish
- 39°58′36.2″N 75°07′45.6″W
- Location: 1608 E. Berks Street; Philadelphia, Pennsylvania
- Country: United States
- Denomination: Roman Catholic

History
- Status: Parish church (building closed 2014)
- Founded: 1882
- Founder: Polish immigrants
- Dedication: Saint Laurentius

Architecture
- Functional status: TBD
- Closed: March 29, 2014

Administration
- Province: Philadelphia
- Archdiocese: Philadelphia

Clergy
- Archbishop: Cardinal Justin Francis Rigali
- Priest: Father Joe

Saint Laurentius Interior

Saint Laurentius Parish (Polish: Parafia św. Wawrzyńca) was a Roman Catholic parish established in 1882 that largely served people of Polish background in the Fishtown neighborhood of Philadelphia, Pennsylvania, United States.

It was the oldest Polish Roman Catholic Church within the city and Archdiocese of Philadelphia.

The church building was closed at the end of March 2014 due to structural issues, and all religious functions were relocated to Holy Name of Jesus Church, 2 blocks away. St. Laurentius Catholic School, while merging with Holy Name of Jesus Parish School, remains open. Plans for demolition of the church were solidified when the City of Philadelphia granted a permit for the demolition on September 30, 2021. Demolition begun by starting to take down the western steeple in August 2022.

== History ==
The building had Gothic spires and stained glass windows. Its origins date back to a time when pious, but poor, immigrants sought a house of worship.

In the late 19th century, Catholic Polish people in the area desired a parish. Early religious services were held in the basement of St. Boniface Church on Diamond and Hancock Streets, and later, at Norris and Sepviva Streets. Neighborhood children received catechism lessons at a nearby blacksmith shop.

With fewer than fifty devoted family followers and only US$31.50 in the treasury, the Polish people petitioned Archbishop of Philadelphia James F. Wood for a church. In 1882 a house of worship was established. St. Laurentius Church was named (in Latin) after St. Lawrence, a deacon who was martyred under the reign of Roman Emperor Valerian.

Church services began in a modest basement facility at Berks and Memphis Streets. Children began attending school there in 1890, under the instruction of the Felician Sisters, a Polish order of nuns.

The first Polish-speaking priest at St. Laurentius Church, Father Adalbert Malusecki, led efforts to build the church's upper chapel. Architect Edwin Forrest Durang constructed a Gothic-style décor for the sanctuary, which is 114 feet long, 60 feet wide, with three naves. Master craftsmen from Mannheim, Germany were called upon to build an ornate wooden altar, pulpit, statues and elaborate cut-glass windows. Later, in 1912, under the stewardship of Father Gabriel Kraus, the sanctuary was embellished with oil paintings portraying the life of Christ and his Saints.

After the upper church was built, two small homes adjoining the church were purchased and demolished, and a rectory was built. In 1897, under Father Gabriel Kraus, two more properties were purchased for extra classroom space and the construction of a Sisters’ Convent.

In 1899 the school was officially dedicated in a celebration attended by members of Polish lodges from around the Delaware Valley, Bishop Edmond F. Prendergast blessed the building, which was adorned with American and Polish flags.

During Father Karus's 25 years of service improvements were made to the church. In 1919, an elaborate pipe organ was installed. In 1923, when school attendance was steadily increasing, a new school building was erected. The three-story schoolhouse has enough space for 14 classrooms, and more than 350 students. During this time, the school was officially listed on the register of Philadelphia parochial schools. Archbishop Dennis Cardinal Dougherty blessed the new building.

As St. Laurentius School's attendance increased in the mid-1920s, Father Julian G. Zagorski, then assistant at the church, founded the Catholic Young Men's Club. With a focus on athletics the club promoted good sportsmanship and fostered Catholic fellowship among neighborhood boys.

The Great Depression caused financial difficulty, but after fund-raising the church's financial debt was alleviated.

Enrollment at St. Laurentius School continued to increase. By 1938 nearly 800 children were enrolled.

Improvements were made in the 1950s and 1960s, including new heating in the school and rectory. A new convent was erected for the Felician Sisters.

Under Father Garstka's leadership a Boy Scouts of America troop was founded in 1956, and the Catholic Ladies Guild was formed for fund-raising. A newspapers called The Parish Calendar was set up in 1957.

Karol Cardinal Wojtyla, Archbishop of Kraków, Poland, became Pope John Paul II in 1978, succeeding John Paul I. He visited Philadelphia on October 4, 1979.

The Church's 100th year Jubilee was celebrated 1982.

In the mid-1990s the Archdiocese of Philadelphia began to lose parishioners as fewer Catholics attended Mass on a regular basis. Father Frank Gwiazda, appointed in 1986, was faced with raising declining enrollment at St. Laurentius School.

After Holy Name School, St. Anne's School and several other Catholic schools closed in the late 1990s and early 2000s, Saint Laurentius Parish and Fr. Frank Gwiazda welcomed all children to St. Laurentius School. It has worked with The University of Pennsylvania..

In 2013, the Archdiocese of Philadelphia, prompted by financial troubles both centrally and at many parishes, as well as a declining number of clergy to staff parishes, announced the closing of numerous parishes effective July 1. St. Laurentius was among those parishes; it was suppressed as an independent parish effective July 2013. It became a worship site of Holy Name of Jesus Church, also in Fishtown, about 0.2 mile away. At the time, plans were to keep the building at St. Laurentius open as a worship site of the expanded Holy Name Parish; this status would allow the use of the church building for periodic Sunday Masses and special celebrations such as weddings and funerals

On March 29, 2014, the St. Laurentius church building was closed indefinitely due to severe structural problems that left it "in immediate danger of collapse". Independent building inspectors, who had observed deterioration in the brownstone masonry in the fall of 2013, found in a follow-up visit at the end of March that this deterioration had greatly accelerated during the winter, and recommended immediate closure of the structure. All services were moved to Holy Name of Jesus Parish nearby on Gaul Street while the Archdiocese of Philadelphia determined the fate of the building.

On March 22, 2015, the Archdiocese revealed that they would go forward with demolishing St. Laurentius due to an excess of $3.5 million in repairs and accelerated structural deterioration due to previous weather conditions. The cost of the demolition was estimated to be $1 million and will be borne by Holy Name Parish which took ownership of St. Laurentius when it became a worship site of Holy Name before its closure. The money will be raised by selling unutilized buildings on the parish campus, according to CatholicPhilly, which also said that the decision would not affect the St. Laurentius School, which will continue to operate.

On July 10, 2015, the Philadelphia Historical Commission voted overwhelmingly to grant the 19th-century building historic status in an attempt to protect the church from demolition - at least temporarily.

Zoning for an 8-story residential building with 49 units was approved in January 2022. The facade must be retained or rebuilt after demolition.
