= St. Joseph's Preparatory School =

Jesuit high school in Philadelphia, US

Location
- 1733 West Girard Avenue; Philadelphia, Pennsylvania 19130; United States; 39°58′21″N 75°9′53″W

Information
- Type: Private, All-boys college-preparatory educational institution
- Motto: (Latin): Ad Maiorem Dei Gloriam (For the greater glory of God)
- Religious affiliation: Catholic Church (Jesuit)
- Patron saint: Saint Joseph
- Established: 1851; 175 years ago
- Oversight: Society of Jesus
- President: John F. Marinacci
- Principal: John McCaul
- Grades: 9–12
- Gender: Boys
- Enrollment: 937 (2024-2025)
- Campus size: 6.5 acres (2.6 ha)
- Campus type: Urban
- Colors: Crimson and Gray
- Slogan: Educating Men of Competence, Conscience & Compassion since 1851
- Song: Swing on Along With the Crimson
- Athletics conference: Philadelphia Catholic League; PIAA USRowing
- Nickname: Hawks
- Rival: La Salle College High School
- Accreditation: Middle States Association of Colleges and Schools
- Publication: Chronicle (literary magazine)
- Newspaper: The Hawkeye
- Yearbook: The Chronicle
- Tuition: $28,300 (2025-2026)
- Website: www.sjprep.org
- Girard Avenue Historic District
- U.S. National Register of Historic Places
- Location within Philadelphia Location within Pennsylvania Location within the United States
- Built: Mid-late 19th century
- Architects: Edwin Forrest Durang, et al.
- Architectural style: Baroque Revival
- NRHP reference No.: 85003427
- Added to NRHP: October 31, 1985
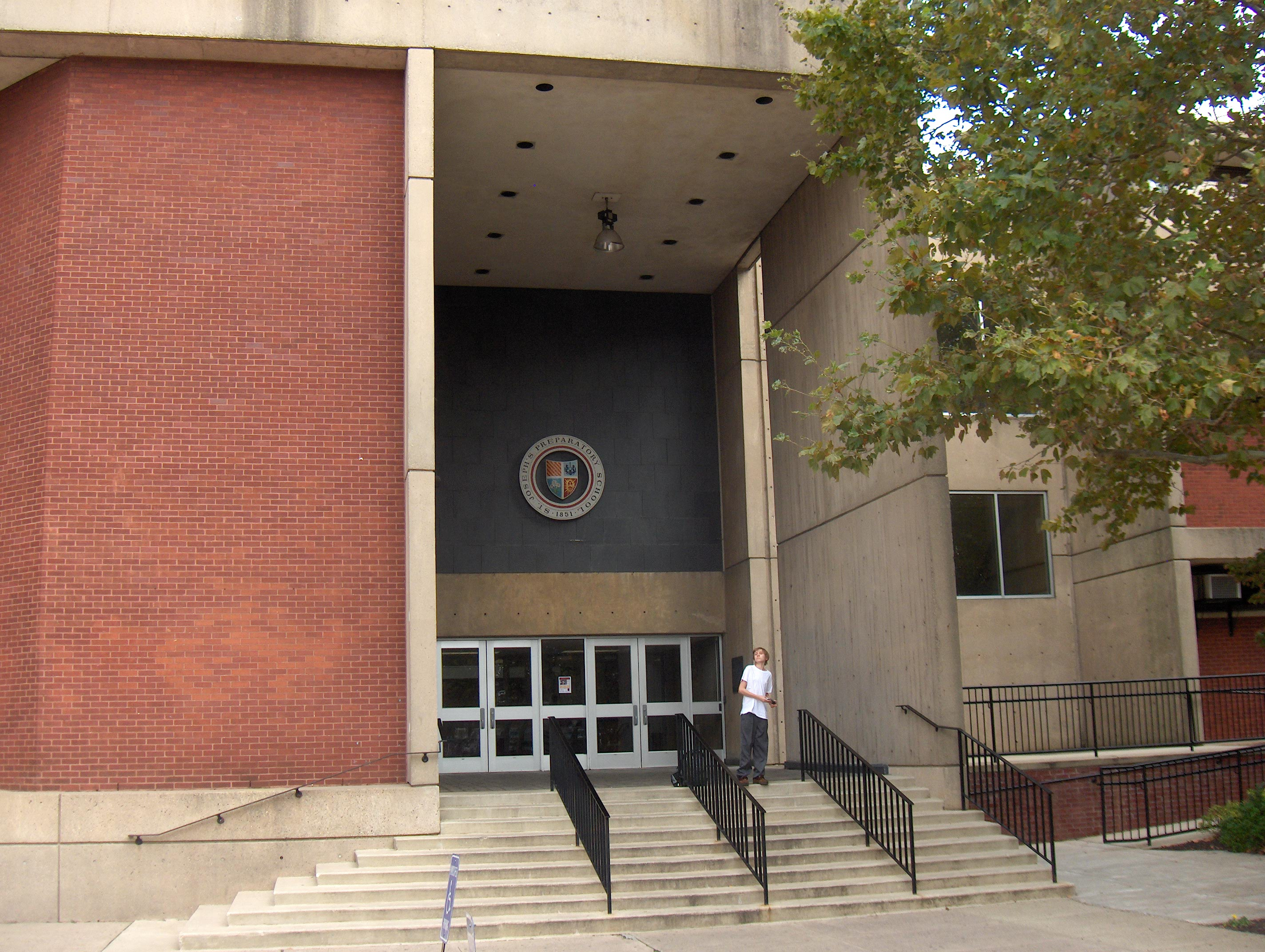
- Main Entrance

St. Joseph's Preparatory School, commonly known as St. Joe's Prep or simply "The Prep", is an urban, private, Catholic, college preparatory school run by the Society of Jesus in Philadelphia, Pennsylvania, United States. The school was founded in 1851 from the Old St. Joseph's Church in the city's Society Hill neighborhood. The school moved to its current campus on Girard Avenue in the 1870s with the construction of the Church of the Gesu.

== Curriculum ==
The credits must satisfy the minimums in religious studies (4), English (4), mathematics / computer science (4), history (3), science (3), classics & modern language (5), fine arts (1), electives (2). A minimum of two of the language credits must be in classics.

== Extracurricular activities ==
=== Athletics ===
St. Joseph's Prep's athletic teams compete as one of the 16 schools in the Philadelphia Catholic League. The Prep joined the Pennsylvania Interscholastic Athletic Association in the 2007–2008 school year. The Prep offers the following athletic programs:

Fall: cross country, football (varsity, junior varsity, and freshmen), crew (varsity and junior varsity), rugby, soccer (varsity, junior varsity, and freshmen), squash (varsity and junior varsity), Ultimate Frisbee (club), and golf.

Winter: basketball (varsity, junior varsity, and freshmen), bowling (varsity and junior varsity), indoor track and field, swimming, wrestling (varsity and junior varsity), and ice hockey (varsity, junior varsity, and freshmen).

Spring: baseball (varsity, junior varsity, and freshmen), crew (varsity, junior varsity, and freshmen), volleyball, lacrosse, outdoor track and field, tennis, mountain biking, Ultimate Frisbee (club), and rugby (varsity, junior varsity, freshmen/sophomore).

The boys senior eight crew team has won the Stotesbury Cup in national competition 16 times; in 1955, 1987, 1992, 1995, 1997, 1999–2001, 2005, 2008, 2010, 2019, 2021, 2023, 2024, and 2025. Additionally, the Prep is the only team to ever sweep all the boys' eights events at the Stotesbury Cup Regatta, having done it in 1997, 2008, 2023, 2024 and 2025. In 2021, the team set a record of winning 6 gold medals at the Stotesbury Cup [Senior 8+, Senior 4+, Second 8+, Lightweight 8+, Junior 4+, & Freshman 8+].

In 2000, the Prep Varsity 8 won the Princess Elizabeth Challenge Cup at the Henley Royal Regatta. In 2021, St. Joseph's Prep won the USRowing Youth National Championship in the Men's 8+ for the first time. This was the first time a scholastic team won the national championship in over a decade. Subsequently, the Prep varsity 8 earned a silver medal at Youth Nationals in 2024. Additionally, in 2025, St. Joseph's Prep won the Under-17 8+ at the USRowing Youth National Championship.

The Prep football team won back-to-back state championships, winning the Class 4A state championship in 2014 with a 49–41 win against Pine-Richland High School in the finals. Despite losing to La Salle College High School early in the 2015 playoffs, the St. Joseph's Prep football team won the first-ever Class 6A PIAA state championship, defeating Pittsburgh Central Catholic by a score of 42–7 at HersheyPark Stadium in Hershey, Pennsylvania. The team won the program's fourth state title in 2018 with a 40–20 win against Harrisburg High School in the Class 6A tournament final.

== Notable alumni ==
=== Academia and education ===
- Robert L. Barchi, president of Rutgers University and president of Thomas Jefferson University
- Mark C. Reed, president of Loyola University Chicago; president of Saint Joseph's University
- Joseph A. Sellinger, president of Loyola University Maryland
- Michael J. Wade, evolutionary biologist

=== Authors and writers ===
- Richard Corliss, film critic and editor for TIME magazine.
- Christopher McDougall, author of Born to Run

=== Business ===
- John McShain, building contractor; known as "The Man Who Built Washington"
- Frank Quattrone, investment banker; founder/CEO of Qatalyst Group

=== Catholic Church ===
- William J. Byron, president of The Catholic University of America and the University of Scranton; president of the Prep, 2006–2008
- John Foley, president of the Pontifical Council for Social Communications and Grand Master of the Equestrian Order of the Holy Sepulchre of Jerusalem
- Joseph Anthony Galante, bishop of the Roman Catholic Diocese of Camden, New Jersey
- Joseph A. Sellinger, president of Loyola College in Maryland
- Francis B. Schulte, retired Archbishop of New Orleans
- Francis X. Talbot, president of Loyola College in Maryland

=== Entertainment ===
- Jimmy Bruno, jazz guitarist
- Matt Duke, musician
- Henry Gibson, actor
- Henry Jones, Tony Award-winning actor
- Rob McElhenney, creator and co-star of It's Always Sunny in Philadelphia; co-owner of Welsh association football club Wrexham A.F.C.
- Michael Rady, actor
- Dan White, magician

=== Engineering ===
- John R. Casani, engineer

=== Government and politics ===
- John F. Byrne Sr., Philadelphia City Councilman and Pennsylvania state senator
- Johnny Dougherty, labor leader
- Joseph T. English, chief psychiatrist of the United States Peace Corps, administrator of the Health Services and Mental Health Administration in the United States Department of Health, Education, and Welfare, and the founding president of the New York City Health and Hospitals Corporation (HHC)
- Andrew von Eschenbach, United States Commissioner of Food and Drugs; director at BioTime
- Vince Fumo, Pennsylvania state senator
- William J. Green III, U.S. Congressman and mayor of Philadelphia
- William K. Greenlee, Philadelphia City Councilman
- Jim Kenney, Philadelphia City Councilman and Mayor of Philadelphia
- Gerald A. McHugh Jr., judge in the United States District Court for the Eastern District of Pennsylvania
- Michael Nutter, Philadelphia City Councilman and Mayor of Philadelphia
- Brian J. O'Neill, Minority Leader of the Philadelphia City Council
- Matthew J. Ryan, speaker of the Pennsylvania House of Representatives

=== Military ===
- Joseph F. Kilkenny, naval officer

=== Sports ===
- Peter Cipollone, 2004 Olympic gold-medalist and world record-holder in rowing
- Kyle Criscuolo, professional ice hockey player
- Frank Costa, college football player
- Joe DeCamara, sports radio host
- Colin Farrell, world champion rower and head coach for University of Pennsylvania lightweight men's crew
- Rich Gannon, football player, 2002 National Football League MVP
- Matt Guokas, basketball player, Philadelphia 76ers, head coach, Orlando Magic
- Marvin Harrison Jr., NFL player for the Arizona Cardinals; former Ohio State All-American, 2023 recipient of the Biletnikoff Award
- Fritz Henrich, baseball player for the Philadelphia Phillies
- Victor Hobson, NFL player for the Arizona Cardinals
- Jim Knowles, head coach of Cornell University football team, defensive coordinator, University of Tennessee football team
- Phil Martelli, head coach of Saint Joseph's University basketball team, assistant coach of University of Michigan basketball team
- Kyle McCord, NFL player for the Green Bay Packers
- Jim McKay, sports journalist
- John Reid, NFL cornerback for the Atlanta Falcons
- Jon Runyan Jr., NFL offensive lineman for the Green Bay Packers
- Kevin Stefanski, NFL head coach for the Atlanta Falcons
- D'Andre Swift, NFL running back for the Chicago Bears
- Jeremiah Trotter Jr., NFL linebacker for the Philadelphia Eagles
- Josiah Trotter, NFL linebacker for the Tampa Bay Buccaneers
- Isaiah West, college football running back for the Ohio State Buckeyes
- Olamide Zaccheaus, NFL wide receiver for the Chicago Bears

== See also ==
- List of Jesuit sites
