= Disston Mansion =

Building in Philadelphia, United States

Coordinates: 39.977385°N 75.161788°W

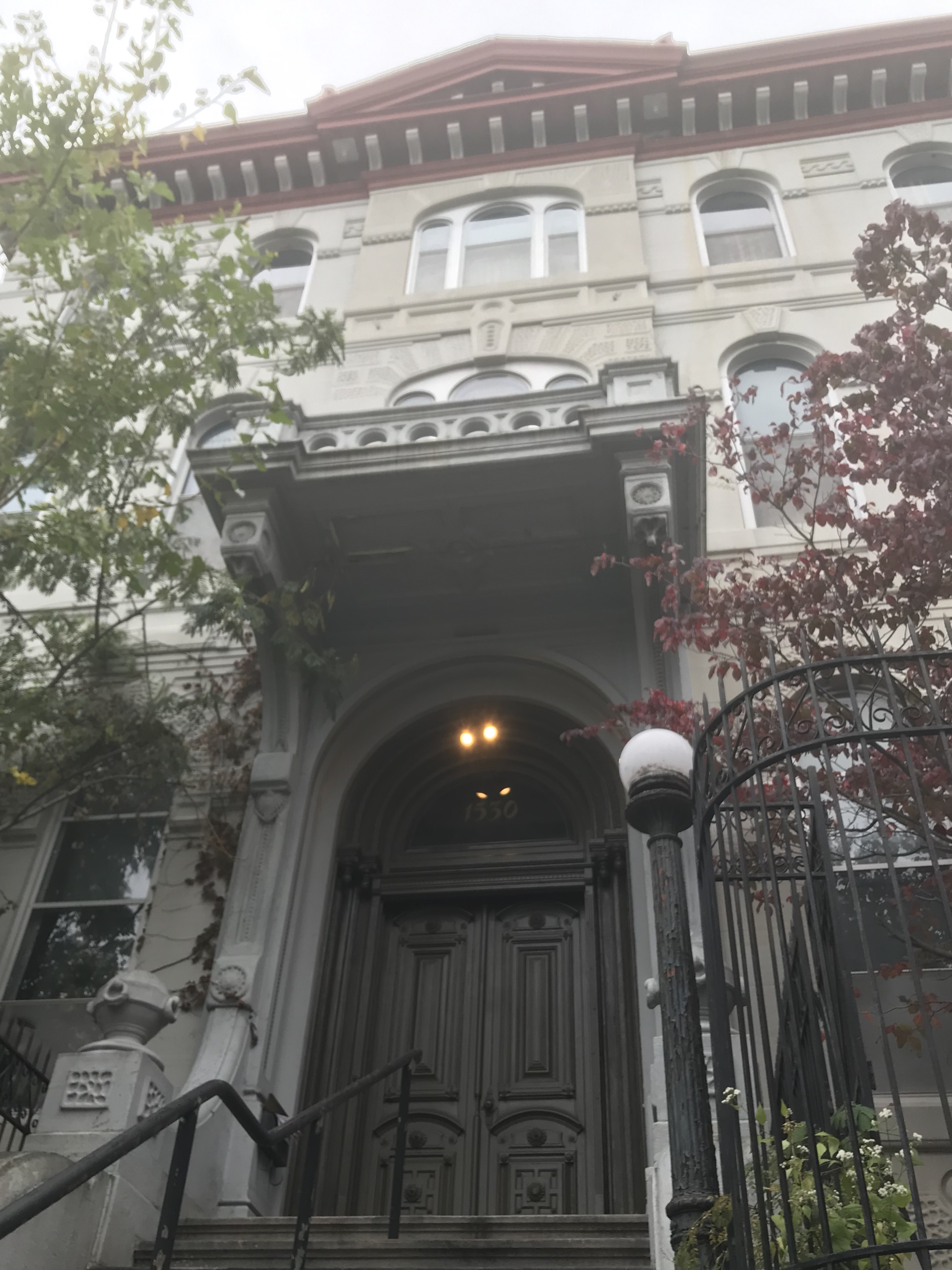

General information
- Address: 1530 N. 16th St.
- Town or city: Philadelphia
- Country: United States

Design and construction
- Architect(s): Edwin Forrest Durang

The Disston Mansion is an American house that is located in North Philadelphia, Pennsylvania.

== History and architectural features ==
Disston Mansion was designed by architect Edwin Forrest Durang, who was best known for his architectural designs of church buildings. It was the residence of Albert H. Disston, who died on October 21, 1883, at the age of 34. Disston was the son of Henry Disston, the founder of the Disston saw company, for which the younger Disston worked. In its notice of Disston's death, the Pittsburgh Commercial Gazette called the house "palatial" and said it was constructed "at a cost of at least $150,000".

In 2018, two stained glass windows were stolen from the house.
