= Masonic Temple (Philadelphia, Pennsylvania) =

Building in Pennsylvania, US

- U.S. National Register of Historic Places
- U.S. National Historic Landmark
- Pennsylvania state historical marker
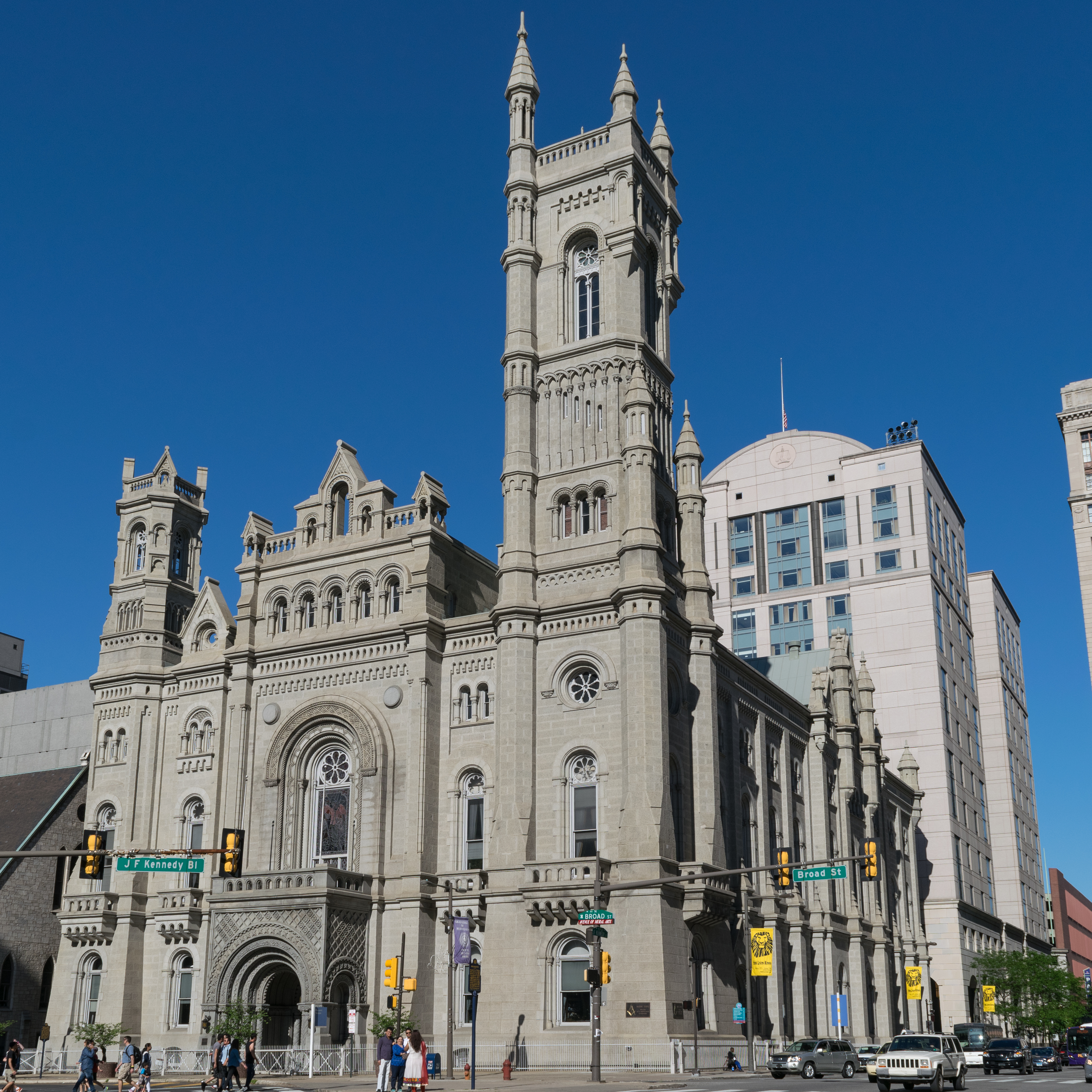
- The Masonic Temple in 2015

- Location within Philadelphia Location within Pennsylvania Location within the United States
- Location: 1 N. Broad Street; Philadelphia, Pennsylvania
- Coordinates: 39°57′13″N 75°9′47″W
- Built: 1868-73
- Architect: James H. Windrim (exterior); George Herzog (interior)
- Architectural style: Norman
- NRHP reference No.: 71000727

Significant dates
- Added to NRHP: May 27, 1971
- Designated NHL: February 4, 1985
- Designated PHMC: December 5, 2007

The Masonic Temple is a historic Masonic building in Philadelphia. Located at 1 North Broad Street, directly across from Philadelphia City Hall, it serves as the headquarters of the Grand Lodge of Pennsylvania, Free and Accepted Masons. The Temple features the Masonic Library and Museum of Pennsylvania, and receives thousands of visitors every year to view the ornate structure, which includes seven lodge rooms, where today a number of Philadelphia lodges and the Grand Lodge conduct their meetings.

== Prior Masonic Temples in Philadelphia ==
Freemasonry existed in Philadelphia since the early 1700s. The original Masonic temple in the city was built in 1811 on Chestnut Street between 7th and 8th Street in Center City Philadelphia, but burned down in 1819. It was rebuilt in 1820. A second Masonic temple was built on Chestnut Street in the 1850s, dedicated in 1855 and sold in 1873, once the new temple was completed.

== Construction ==
The Temple was designed in the medieval Norman style by James H. Windrim, who was 27 years old at the time he won the design competition. The massive granite cornerstone, weighing ten tons, was leveled on St. John the Baptist's Day, June 24, 1868. The ceremonial gavel used on that day by Grand Master Richard Vaux was the same gavel used by President George Washington in leveling the cornerstone of the nation's Capitol building in 1793.

The construction was completed five years later, in 1873, and dedicated on September 29th of that year. The interior, designed by George Herzog, was begun in 1887 and took another fifteen years to finish.

The bold and elaborate elevations on Broad and Filbert Streets, especially the beautiful portico of Quincy granite, make it one of the great architectural wonders of Philadelphia. The exterior stone of the building on Broad and Filbert Streets is Cape Ann Syenite from Syne in Upper Egypt.

On May 27, 1971, the Temple was listed on the National Register of Historic Places. It was designated a National Historic Landmark in 1985. It was cited in its landmark designation as one of the nation's most elaborate examples of Masonic architecture. In the 21st century, it hosts an event venue known as One North Broad.

== Gallery ==
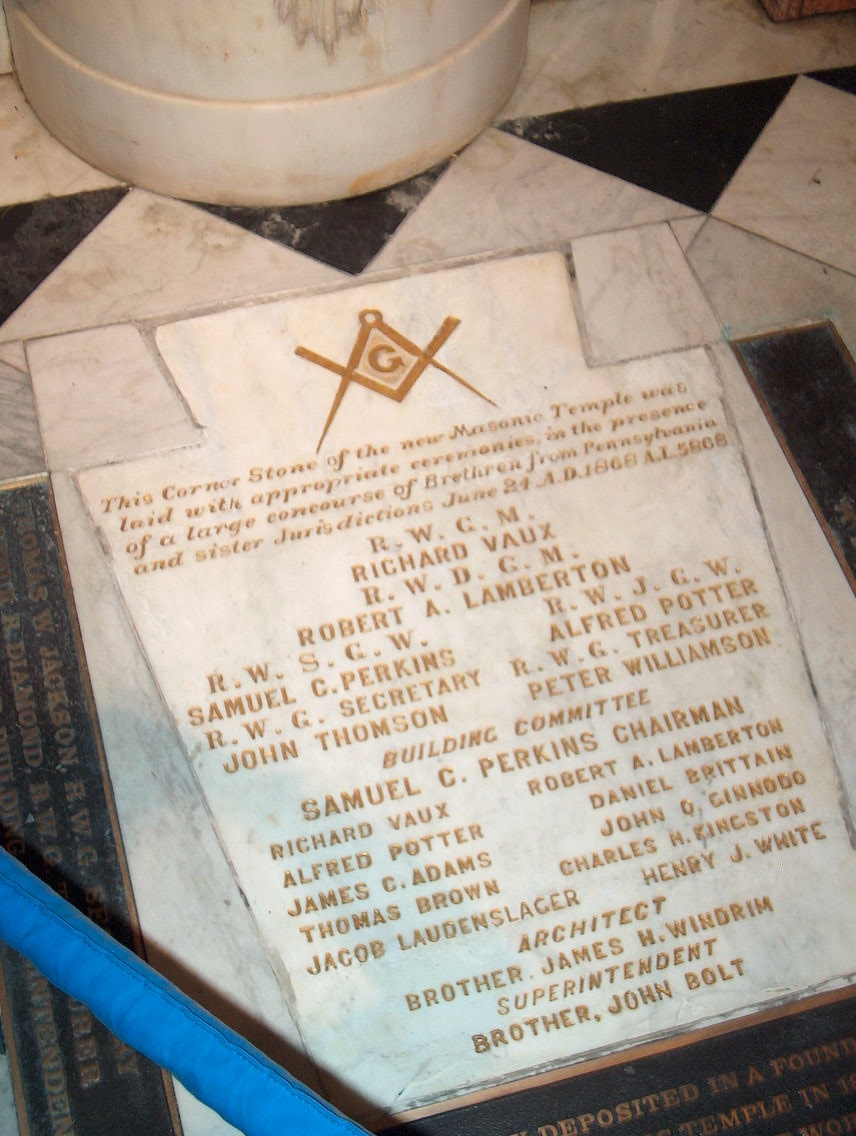
The cornerstone

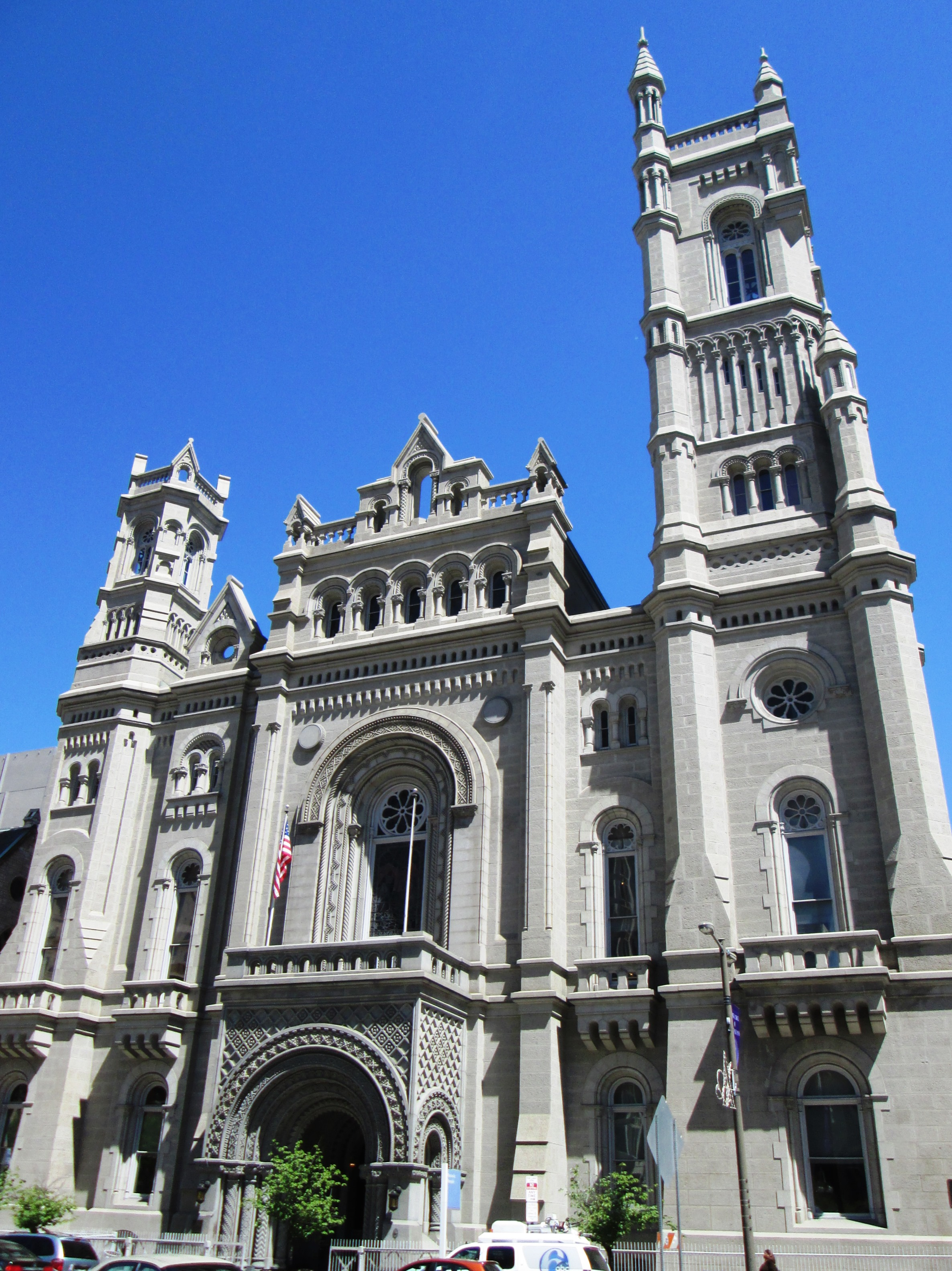
Front facade

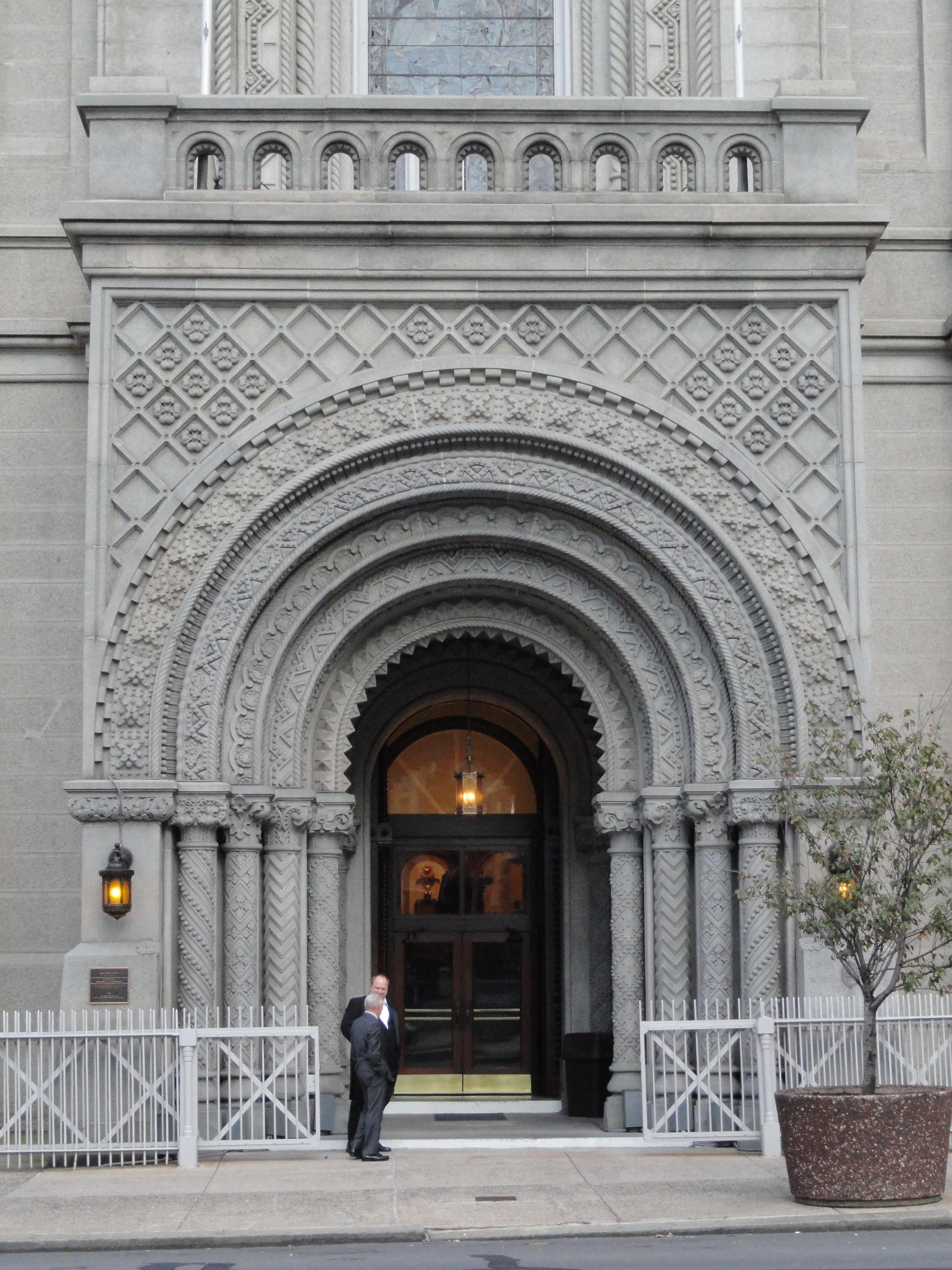
Entrance

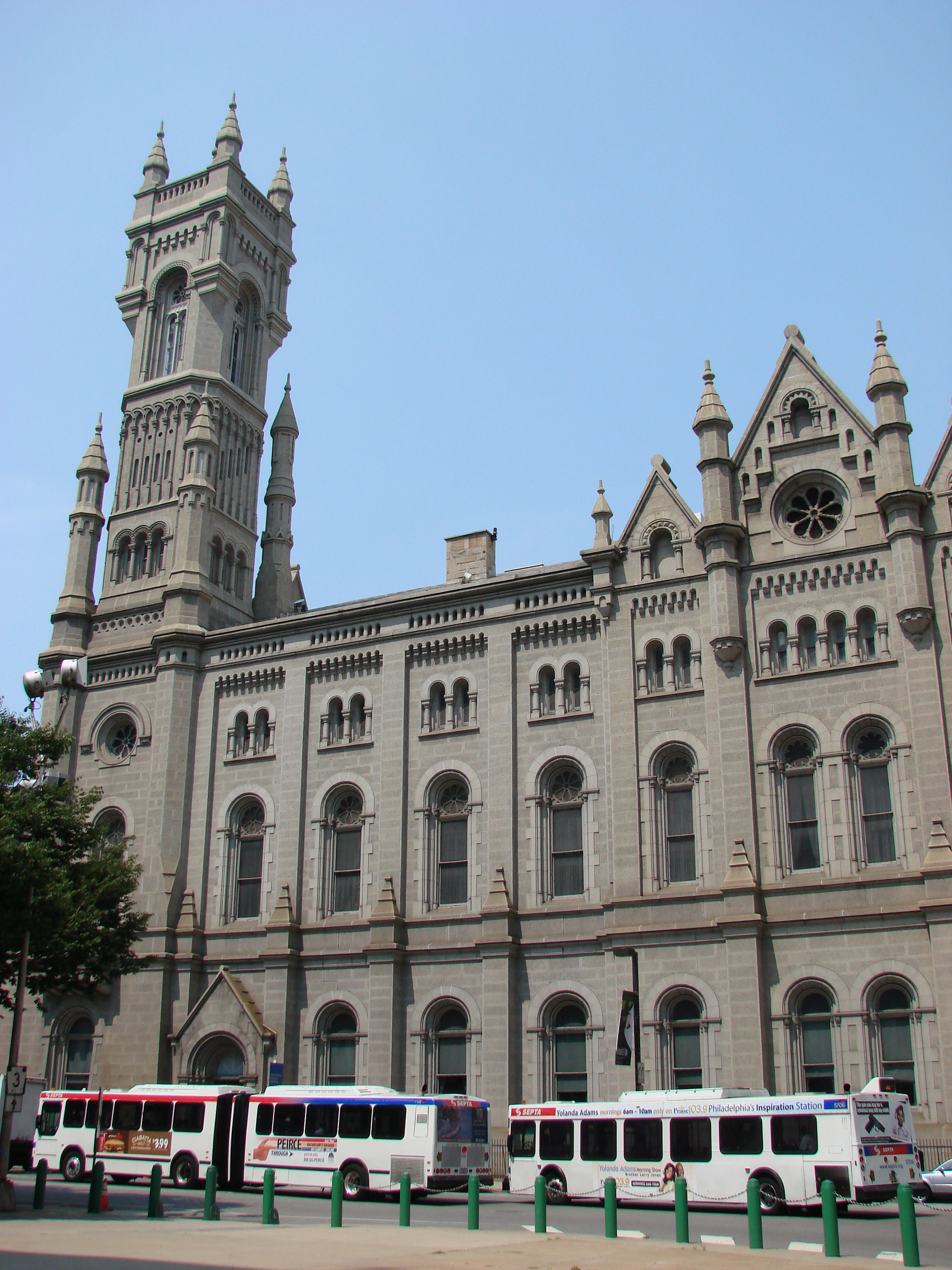
South façade

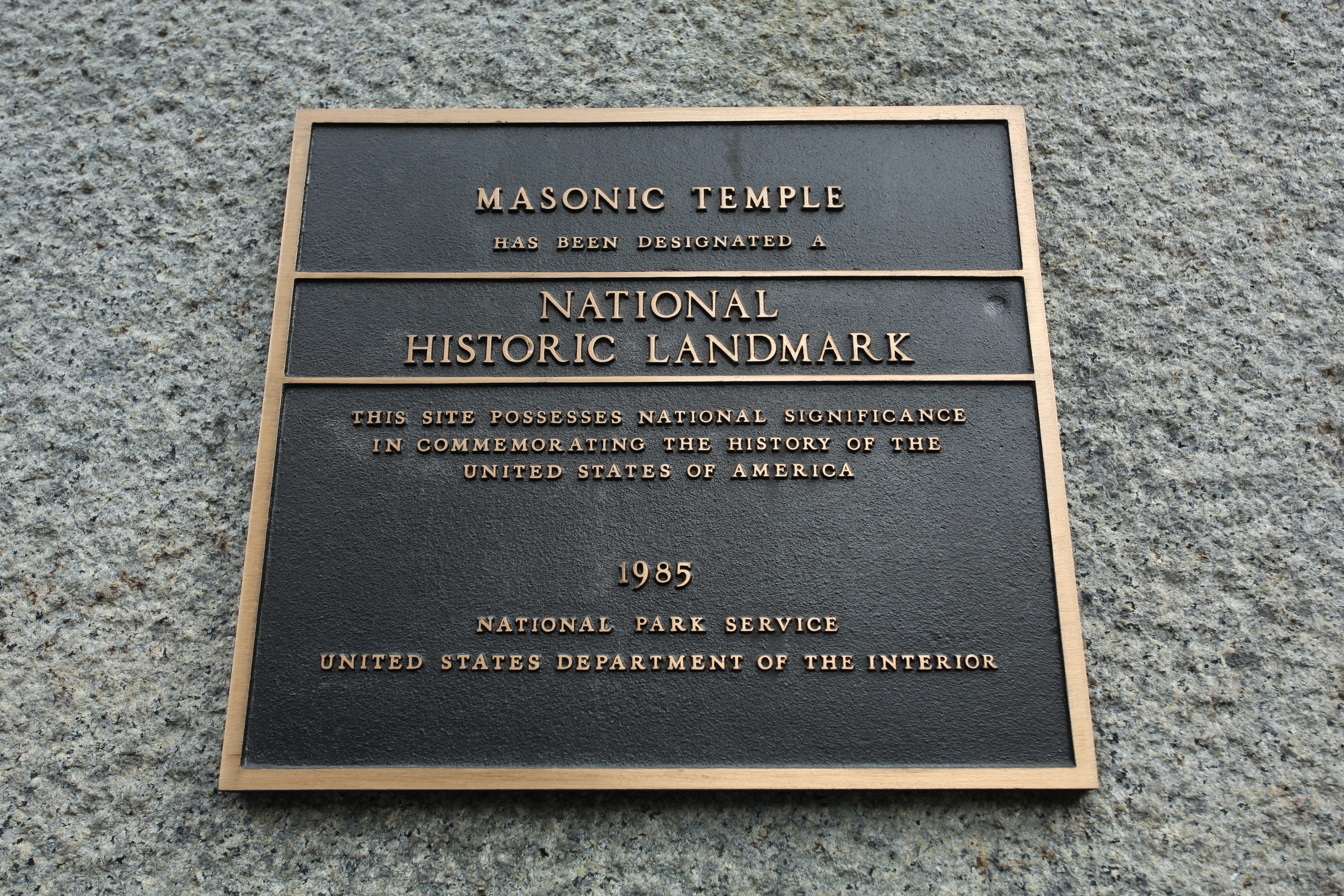
National Historic Landmark Plaque

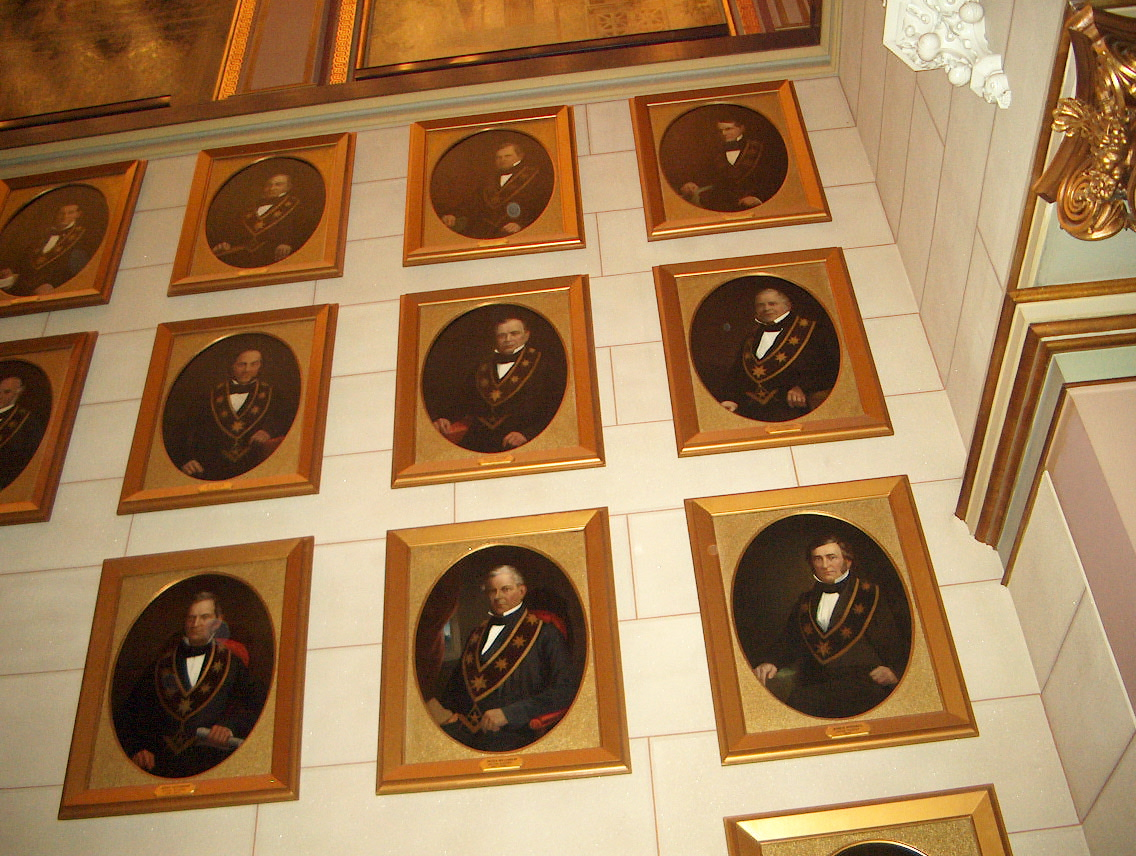

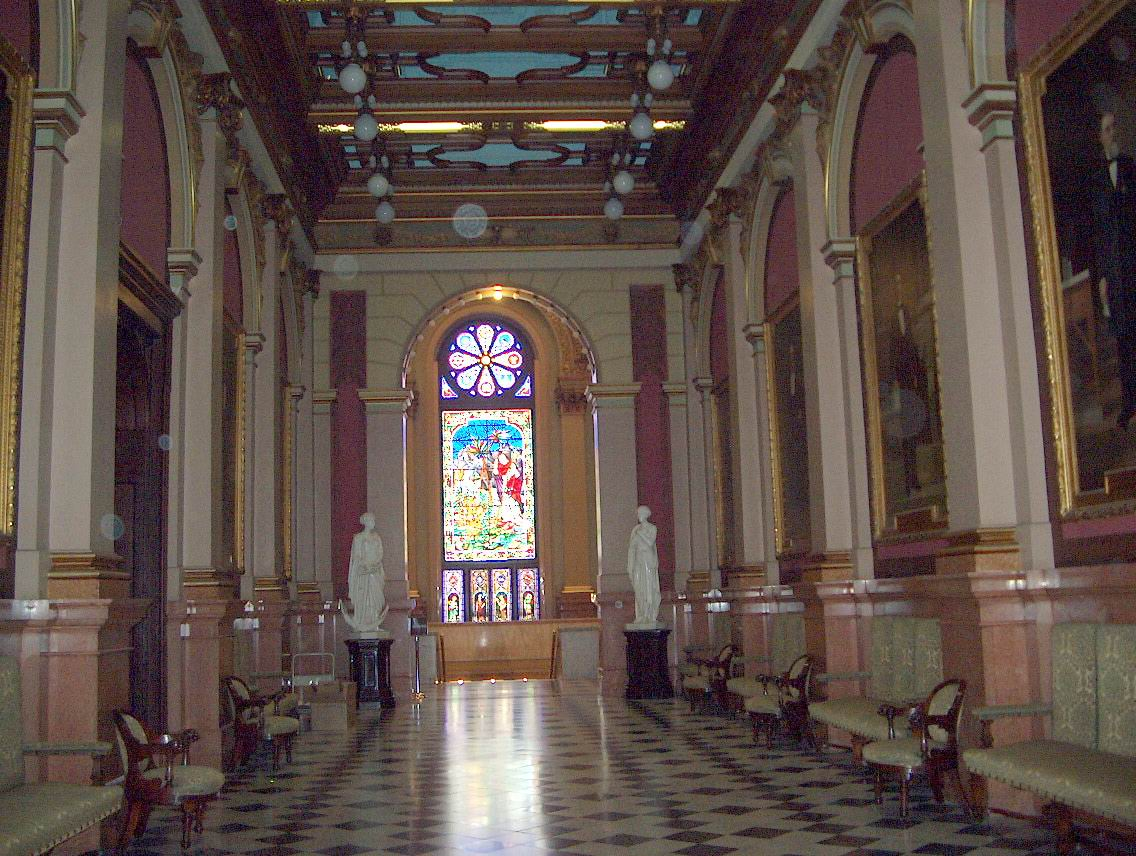

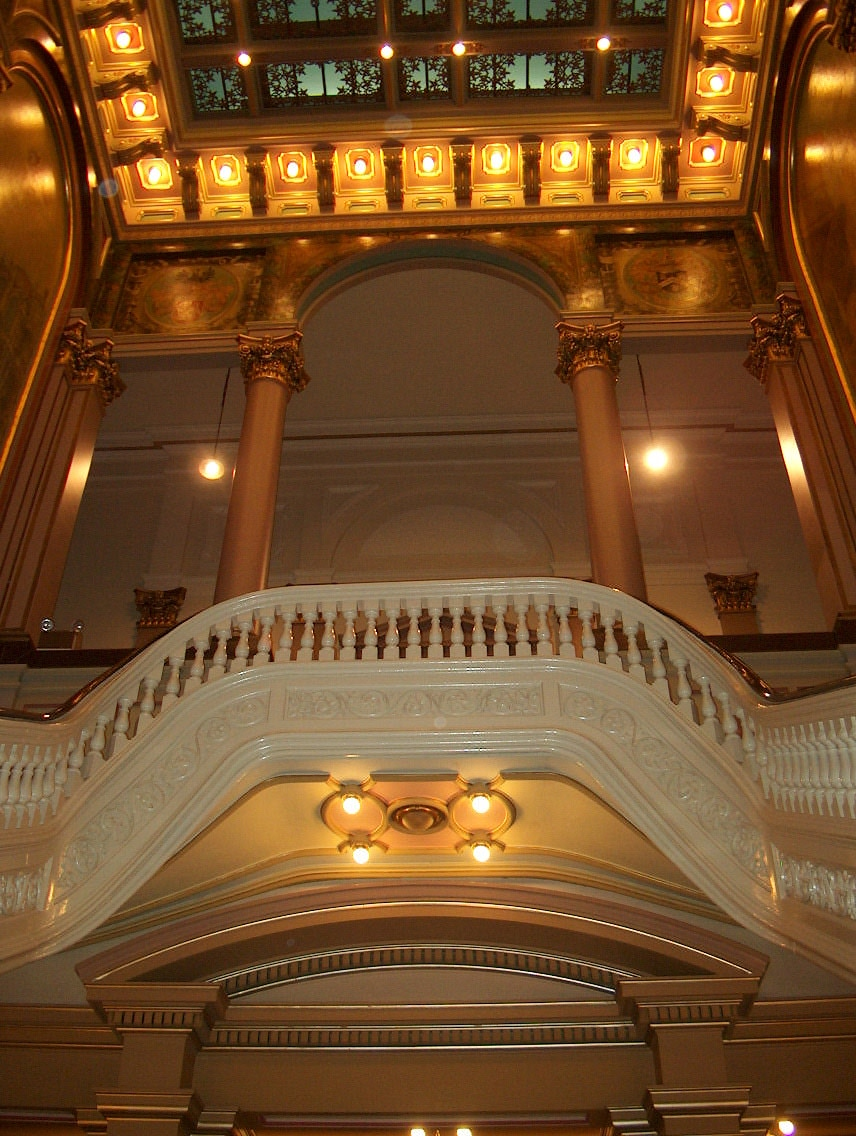

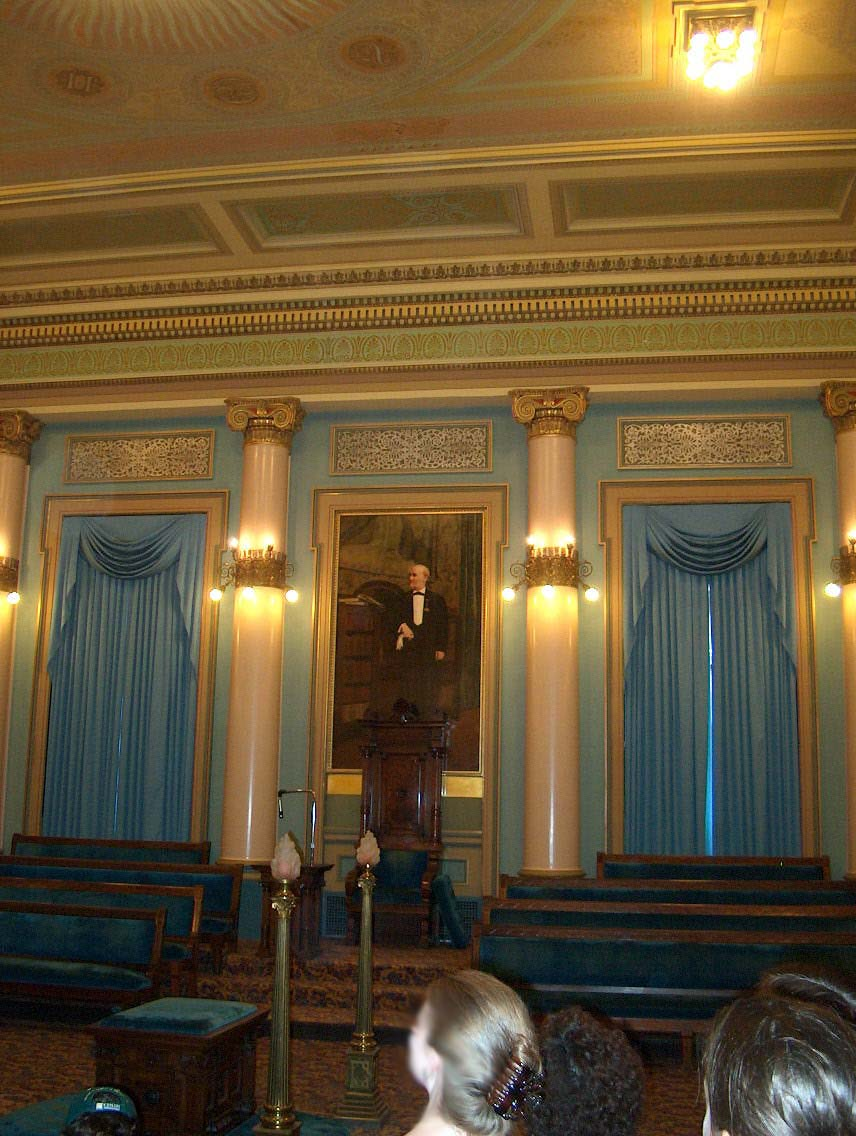

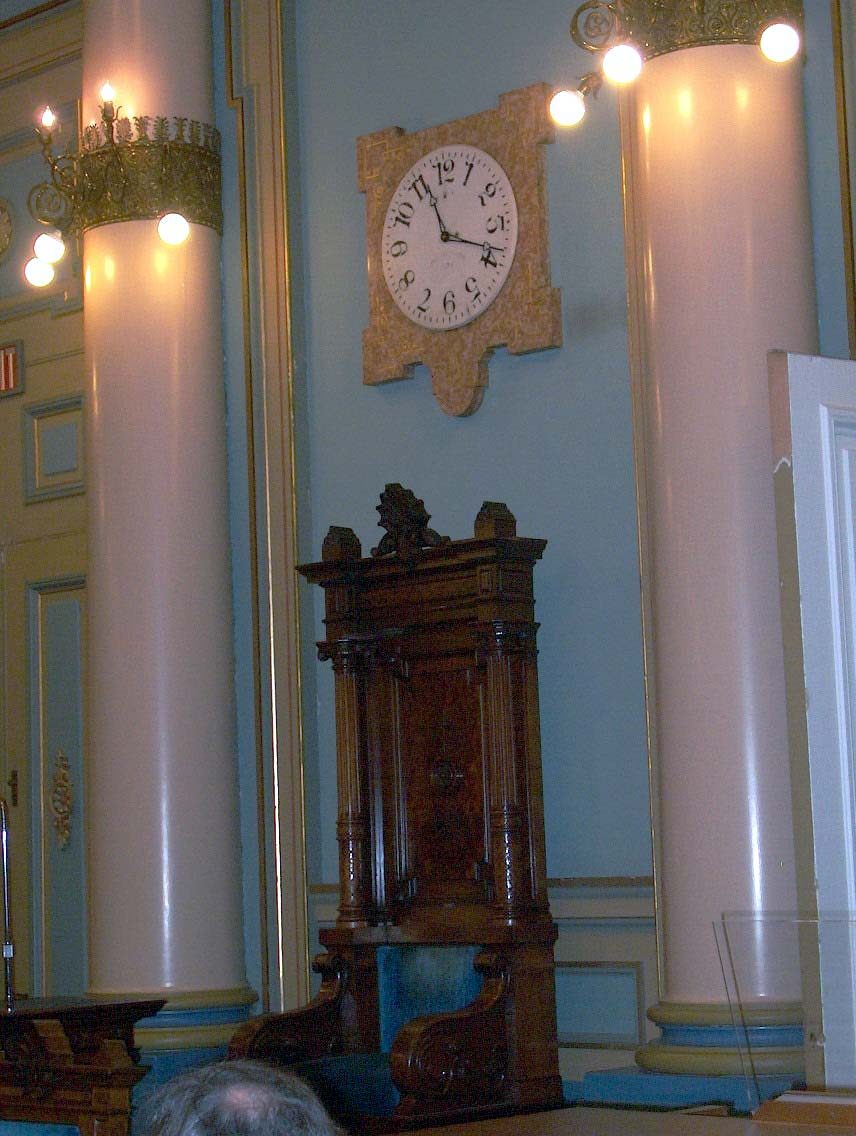

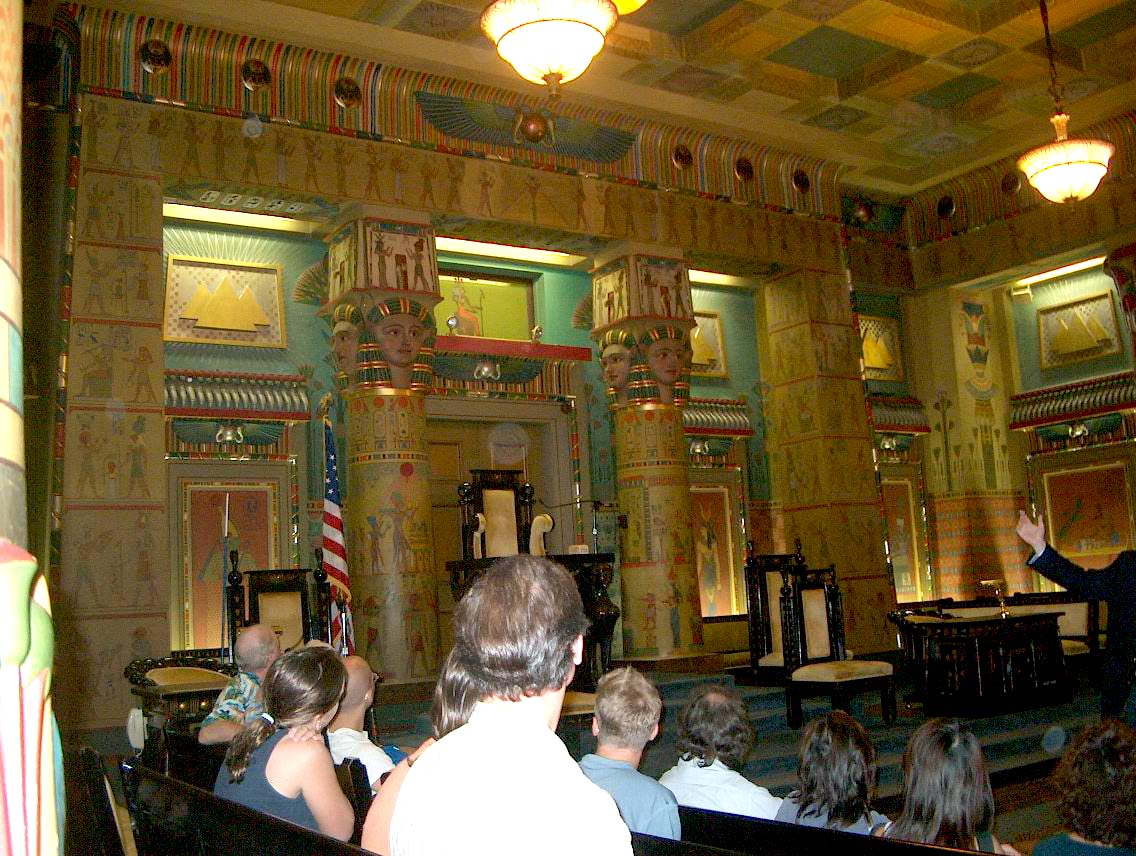

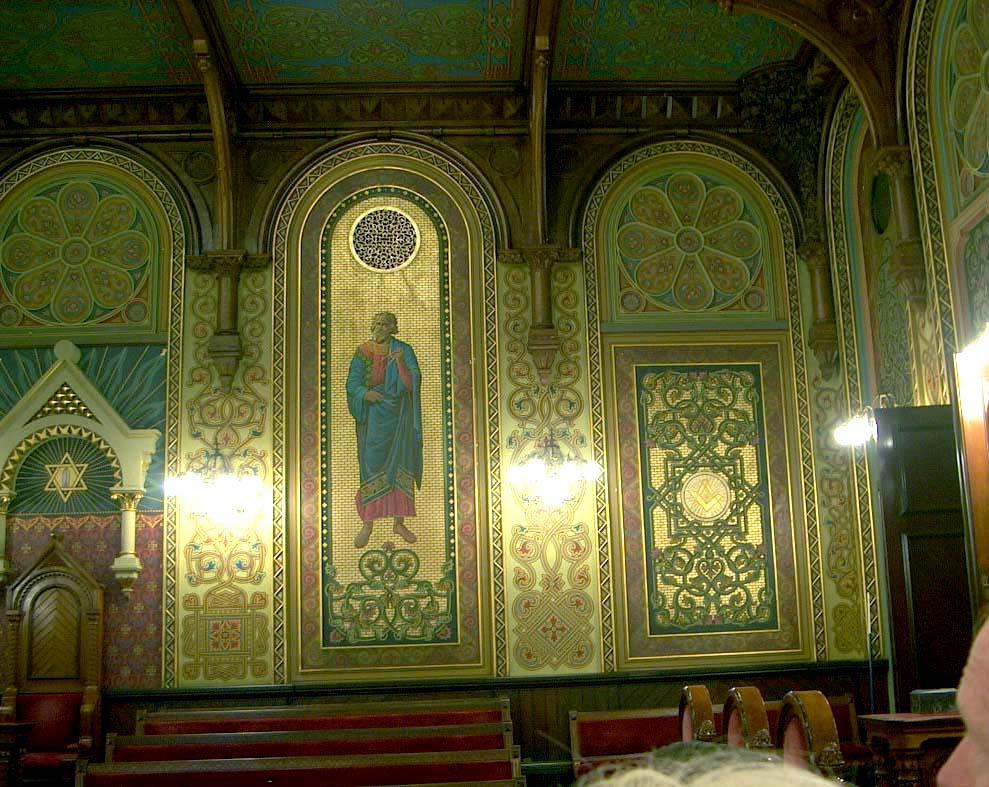

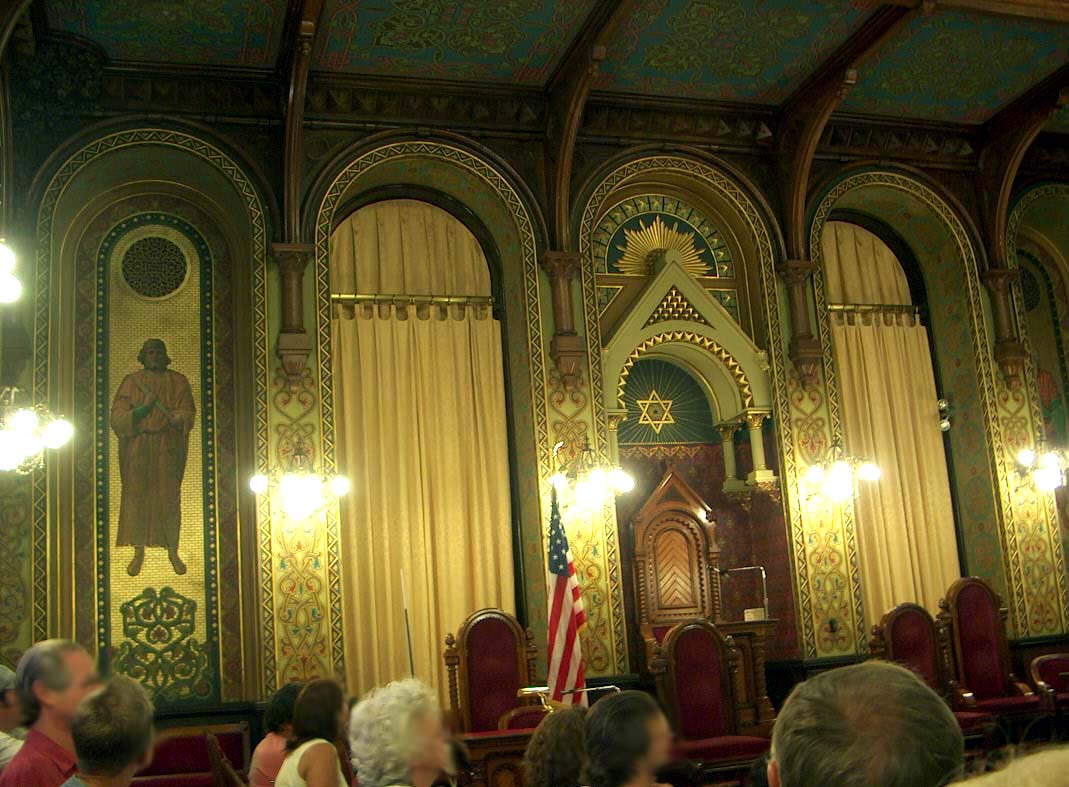

== See also ==
- Joseph A. Bailly (sculptor)
- List of National Historic Landmarks in Philadelphia
- National Register of Historic Places listings in Center City, Philadelphia
- William Rush (sculptor)
