= Church of the Gesú (Philadelphia) =

Catholic church in Philadelphia

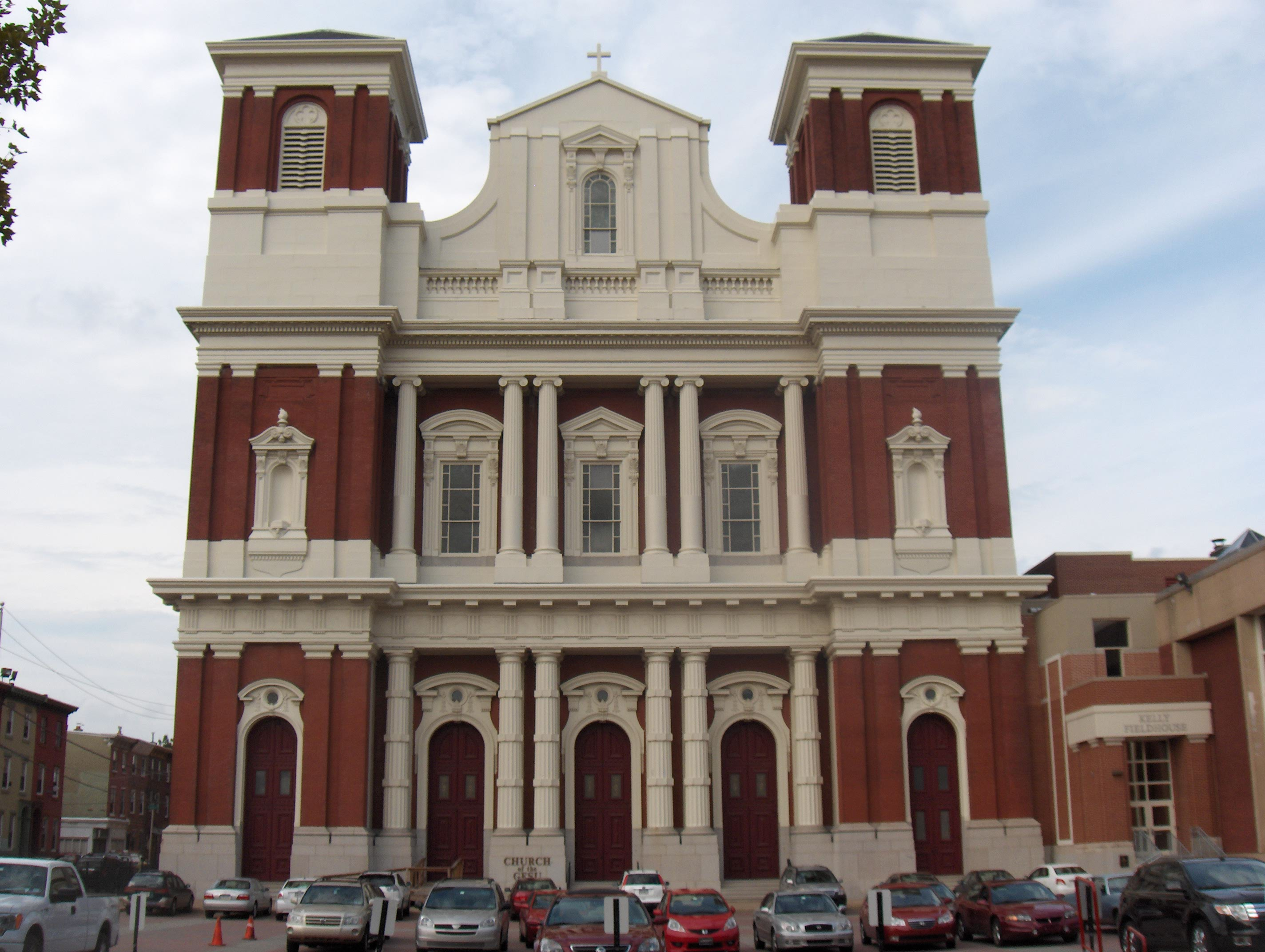
- Facade of the Church of the Gesú in 2009
- Church of the Gesú
- 39°58′25″N 75°09′55″W
- Location: Philadelphia, Pennsylvania
- Country: United States
- Denomination: Catholic
- Religious institute: Society of Jesus

History
- Status: Chapel, former parish church
- Founded: 1868
- Founder: Burchard Villiger
- Consecrated: December 12, 1888

Architecture
- Architect: Edwin Forrest Durang
- Style: Baroque revival
- Years built: 1879–1888
- Closed: 1993

Administration
- Archdiocese: Archdiocese of Philadelphia
- Church of the Gesú
- U.S. Historic district – Contributing property
- Part of: Girard Avenue Historic District (ID85003427)
- Designated CP: October 31, 1985

The Church of the Gesú is a Roman Catholic chapel and former parish church located in Philadelphia, Pennsylvania. Founded in 1868 by Burchard Villiger, the church was the center of several Jesuit educational institutions, including St. Joseph's Preparatory School, St. Joseph's University, and the Gesú School. The Baroque revival church was named after and loosely modeled after the Church of the Gesú in Rome. The parish closed in 1993, and the building became the chapel of St. Joseph's Prep. The church is part of the Girard Avenue Historic District.

== History ==
On December 6, 1868, the Jesuit priest Burchard Villiger founded New St. Joseph's Church, being the second Jesuit Catholic church in Philadelphia after Old St. Joseph's Church in Old City. This was soon renamed the Church of the Holy Family, intending it to be the center of a complex of Jesuit institutions, including St. Joseph's Preparatory School, St. Joseph's University, and the Gesú School. A chapel, refectory, and parochial school were built following the relocation of the preparatory school and university from Old St. Joseph's Church in 1868.

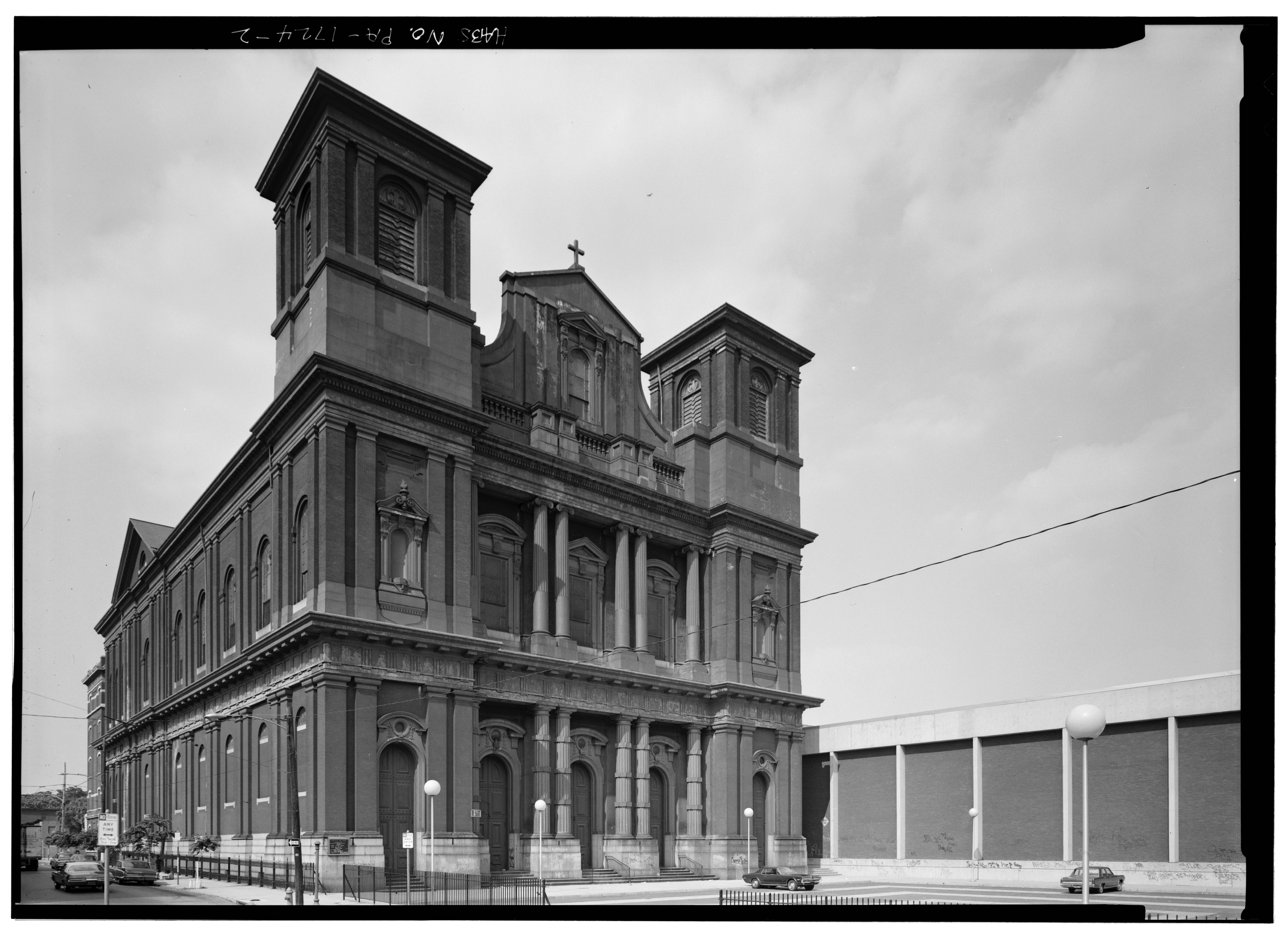
Three-quarter view of the church

The Church of the Holy Family was renamed the Church of the Gesú in 1878, after the Church of the Gesù in Rome, which is the universal mother church of the Society of Jesus. The cornerstone of a new, grander church was laid on March 10, 1879, and the cruciform edifice was completed in 1888. A dedication ceremony was held on December 12, 1888. The Baroque revival church was designed by local architect Edwin F. Durang, and was modeled on its Roman counterpart. The interior, including the murals, was decorated by the Italian artist Nicola D'Ascenzo. The dimensions of the new church were: 100 feet (30 m) high, a central nave 252 feet (77 m) long and 75 feet (23 m) wide, and a main altar that is 72 feet (22 m) high. The two towers of the facade, on either side of the Doric, Ionic, and Tuscan columns are each 216 feet (66 m) tall.

The church was also outfitted by Villiger with a number of paintings, which included eighteen portraits by the Mexican painter Miguel Cabrera of the Jesuit Superiors General from Saint Ignatius through Lorenzo Ricci, as well as several saints. However, by 1903, these paintings were no longer in the church. By 1891, the church held over 370 relics for veneration by the faithful. Many of them were around 120 years old at the time they were obtained from Rome. The church served as a parish of the Archdiocese of Philadelphia from its opening until its closure in 1993 and merger with Saint Malachy's Church. The building was repurposed by St. Joseph's Prep as its school chapel.

In 1985, the building was named as a contributing property of the Girard Avenue Historic District.
