= Francis Ferdinand Durang Sr. =

American architect

Francis Ferdinand Durang Sr. (August 11, 1884 – July 4, 1966) was a noted American architect.

Durang was born in Philadelphia, Pennsylvania, the son of one of the city's most prolific architects of Catholic projects, Edwin Forrest Durang. He was educated at Notre Dame Academy in Philadelphia, Collegiate Military Academy and at Drexel Institute.

He took supplementary courses at the Pennsylvania Museum and School of Industrial Art. In 1909 he became a partner in his father's firm, the name of which became Edwin F. Durang & Son.

After his father's death in 1911, he continued the work of the firm under his own name. In the 1940s he relocated to Summit, New Jersey, where he published the Architects' Exchange, a quarterly periodical for the profession. He retired from active practice in 1956, but continued as a consulting architect. Durang achieved emeritus status in the AIA in 1957.

== Works ==
- "Old Main", the original building of Mercyhurst College, Erie, Pennsylvania (1926). Also, addition of O'Neil Tower, Christ the King Chapel, and Queen's Chapel (1932–1933).
- Barbelin Hall, St. Joseph's University (1927).
- College Misericordia, College Misericordia (1921–1924).
- Mercy Hall, College Misericordia (1924).
