= Edwin Forrest Durang =

American architect

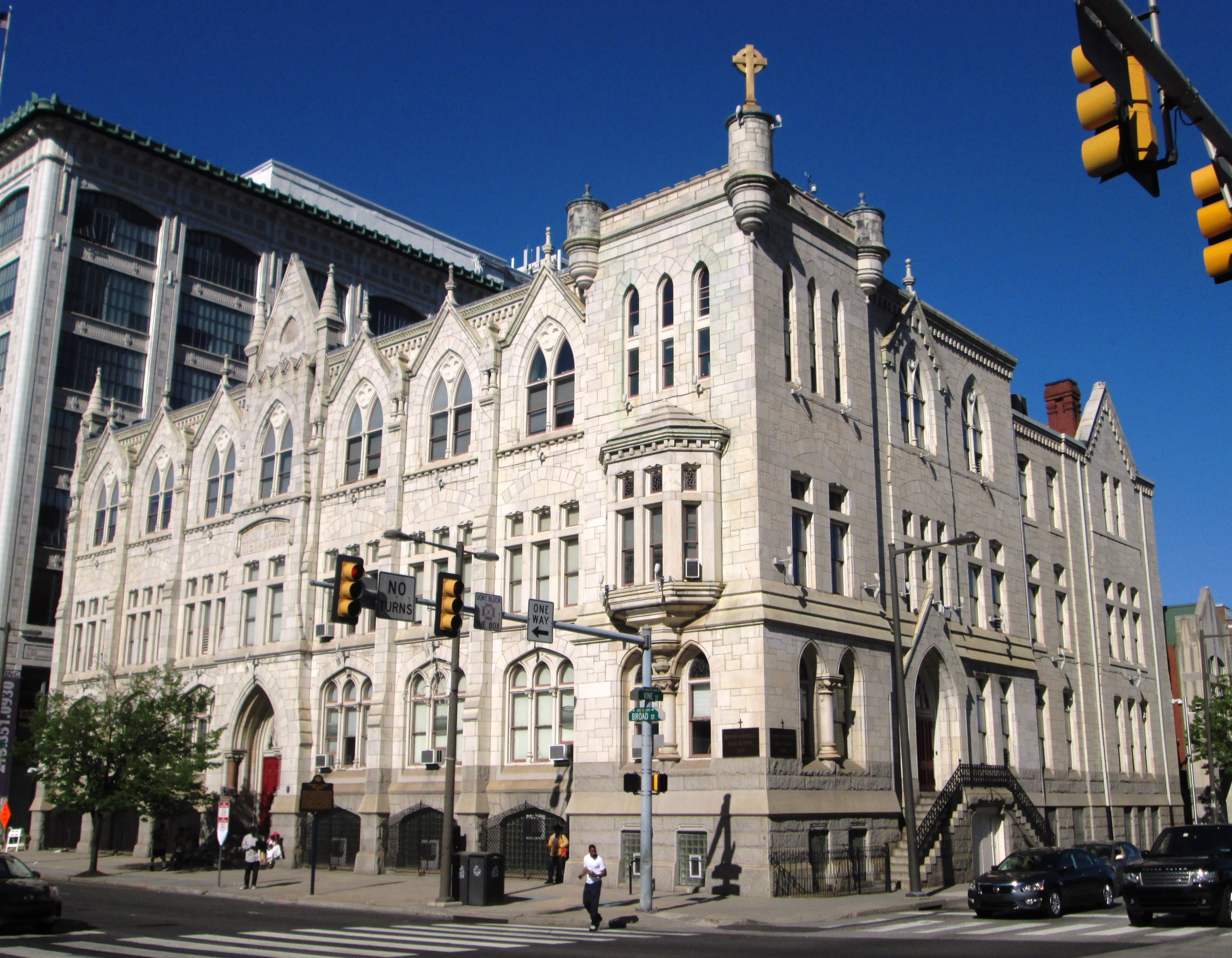
Roman Catholic High School (1890), Broad & Vine Streets, Philadelphia, Pennsylvania.

Edwin Forrest Durang (April 17, 1829 – June 7, 1911) was an American architect. He kept offices in Philadelphia and specialized in ecclesiastical and theatrical design.

== Life and career ==
Durang was born in New York City, into a distinguished theatrical family. His grandfather, John Durang (1768–1822), has been credited with being the first native-born American actor, and his parents, Charles Durang (1791–1870) and Mary White Durang (b. London, England, 1802), were also well known for their contributions to the stage. His father and uncle, Richard Ferdinand Durang, were the first to perform "The Star-Spangled Banner", and his father also worked as the director and prompter at both the Chestnut Street Theater and the American Theater in Philadelphia. After his retirement in 1853, Charles Durang taught dancing and wrote several books on dance and a history of the Philadelphia stage. In addition to her stage work, Edwin Durang's mother wrote six children's books. Durang was named for his father's friend, noted actor Edwin Forrest.

Little is known of Durang's youth or education, but by 1855 he had set up as an architect in Philadelphia. By 1857 he had begun working with John E. Carver, a residential and ecclesiastical architect. On Carver's death in 1859, Durang succeeded him, emulating his practice by also specializing in ecclesiastical design, mostly for the Roman Catholic Church. He designed many churches, rectories, convents, and schools throughout Pennsylvania, New Jersey, and elsewhere during a practice of more than fifty years.

In November 1909, Durang was joined by his son Francis Ferdinand Durang (1884–1966), who, in turn, succeeded him after his sudden death in Philadelphia in June 1911.

== Works ==
In addition to the buildings listed below, which were almost entirely his own projects, he made interior alterations to the Cathedral-Basilica of Sts. Peter and Paul in Philadelphia. He contributed to the interior of the Academy of Music, 1854. He was also responsible for substantial additions and alterations to the Pro-cathedral of St. Vincent de Paul in Scranton, Pennsylvania prior to the building's reconsecration as the Cathedral of St. Peter in 1883.

=== Philadelphia ===
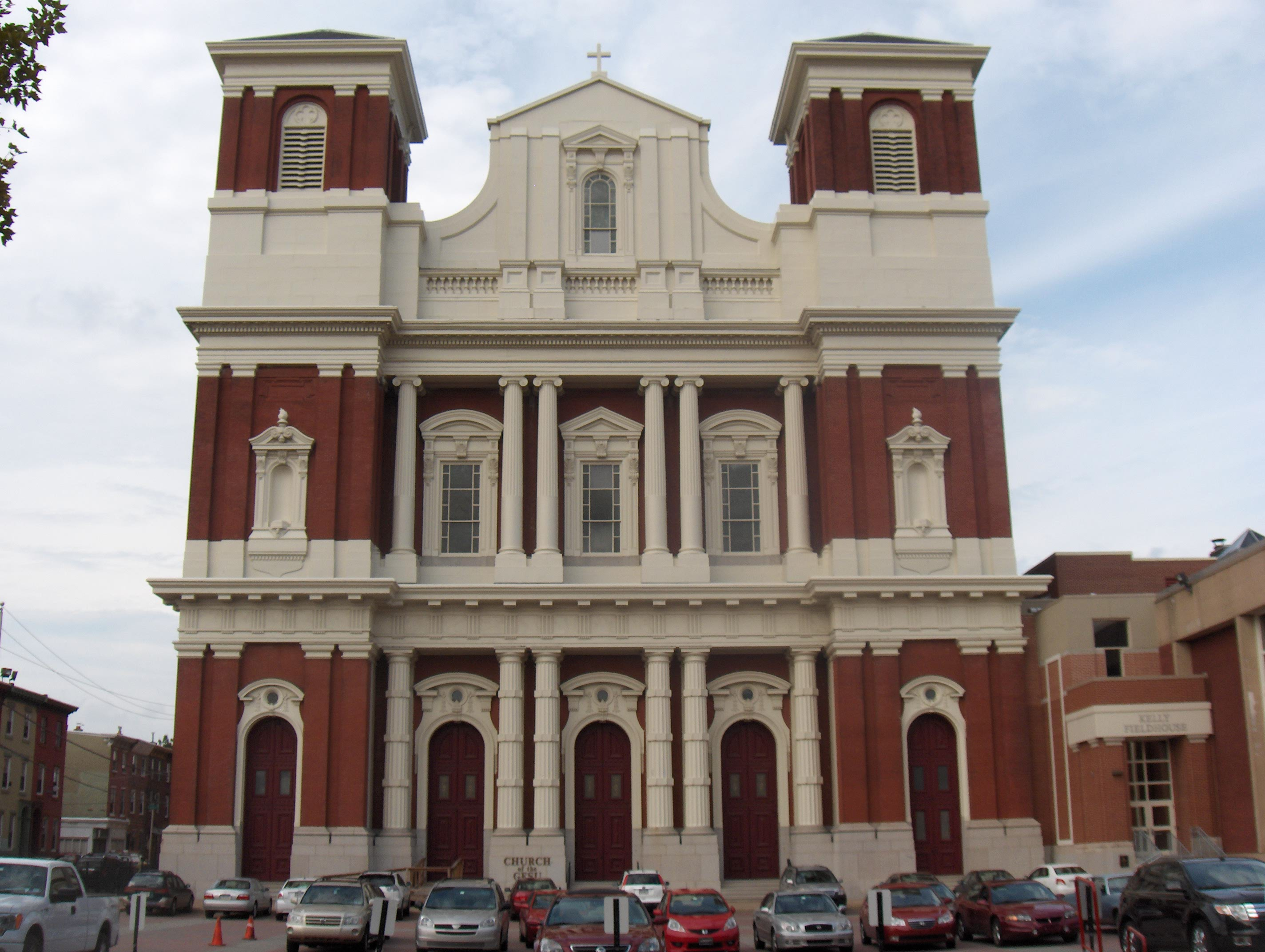
Church of the Gesu (1879-88), 18th Street & Girard Avenue, Philadelphia

- All Saints Roman Catholic Church, Bridesburg.
- St. Agatha – St. James Church (formerly St. James Church), 38th and Chestnut Streets, University City.
- St. Agatha's Roman Catholic Church, 38th and Spring Garden Streets, Powelton Village.
- St. Joseph Hall (1903) and Main Chapel (1884–1891), Chestnut Hill College.
- St. Joachim Church, Frankford.
- Disston House (1881), 1530 N. 16th Street, North Philadelphia.
- St. Laurentius Church, Fishtown
- St. Charles Borromeo Church, 900 S. 20th Street; also convent and school.
- Arch Street Opera House (NRHP added 1978 — Building — #78002442), now known as the Trocadero Theatre, 1003–1005 Arch St. (later modified by George W. Plowman and others).
- Church of the Gesú and school. It is a contributing building to the Girard Avenue Historic District.
- Monument to the Signers of the Declaration of Independence (1860).
- Church of the Nativity of the Blessed Virgin Mary, Port Richmond (1882).
- Roman Catholic High School for Boys (1890), Broad and Vine Streets

=== Philadelphia suburbs ===
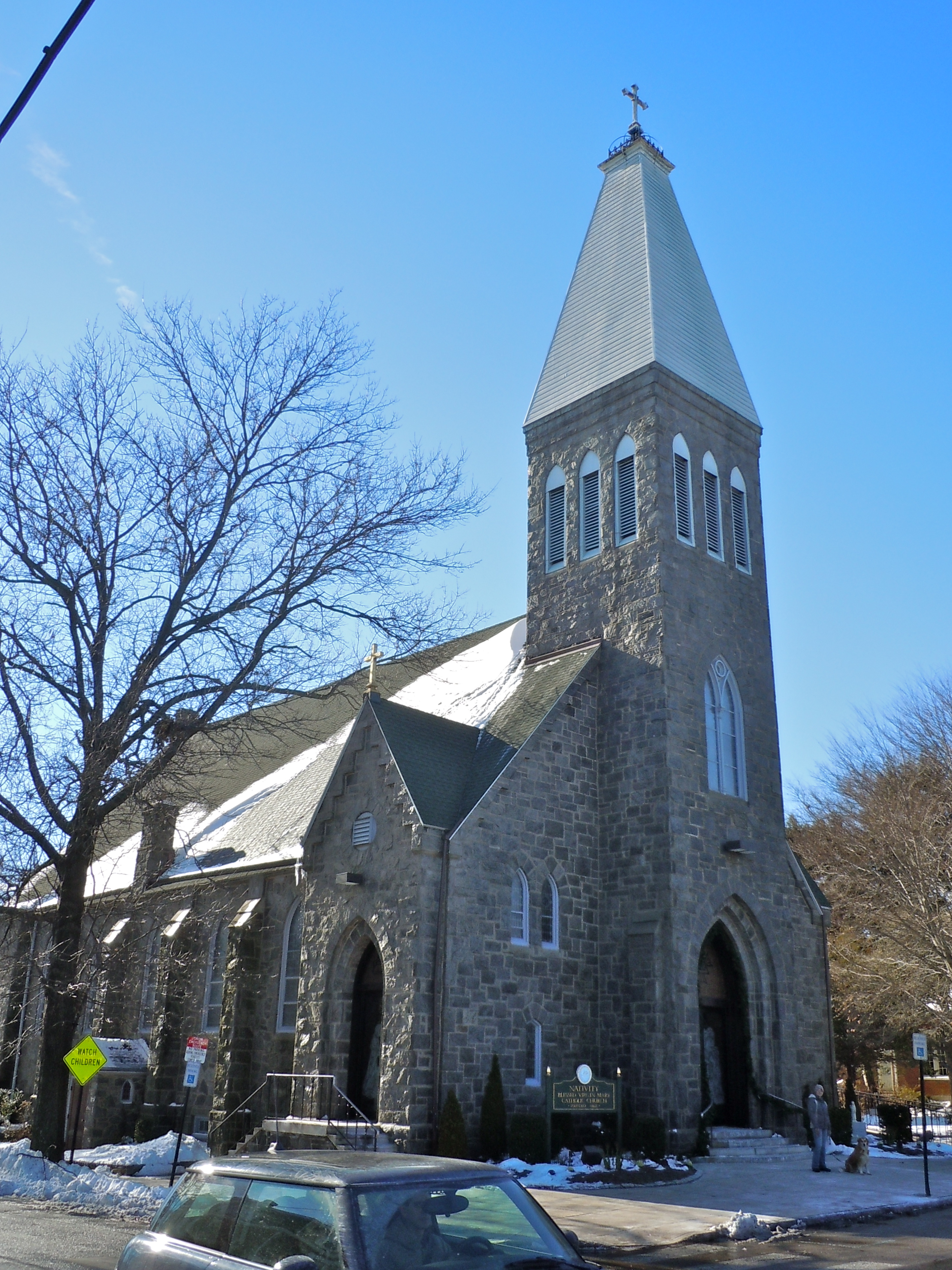
Nativity of the Blessed Virgin Mary Church (1882), Media, Pennsylvania

- Nativity of the Blessed Virgin Mary Church, completed 1882, in Media, Pennsylvania
- Our Mother of Good Counsel R.C. Church (1896), Bryn Mawr. Also rectory, school and convent.
- Sisters of Mercy Convent, Merion.
- Saint Thomas of Villanova Church and Augustinian Monastery, Villanova.
- Waldron Mercy Academy, 511 E. Montgomery Ave., Lower Merion Township.

=== Elsewhere in Pennsylvania ===
- Fulton Opera House, Lancaster. (NRHP, NHL)
- Hampden Firehouse, Reading, Pennsylvania (1887). (NRHP)
- Holy Infancy Church, South Bethlehem.
- St. Mary's Catholic Church, Lancaster (1868).
- St. Mary's Roman Catholic Church, 134 South Washington Street, Wilkes-Barre.
- York Opera House, York.
- St. Thomas Aquinas Church, Archbald, Pennsylvania (dedicated 15 August 1875).

=== Elsewhere ===
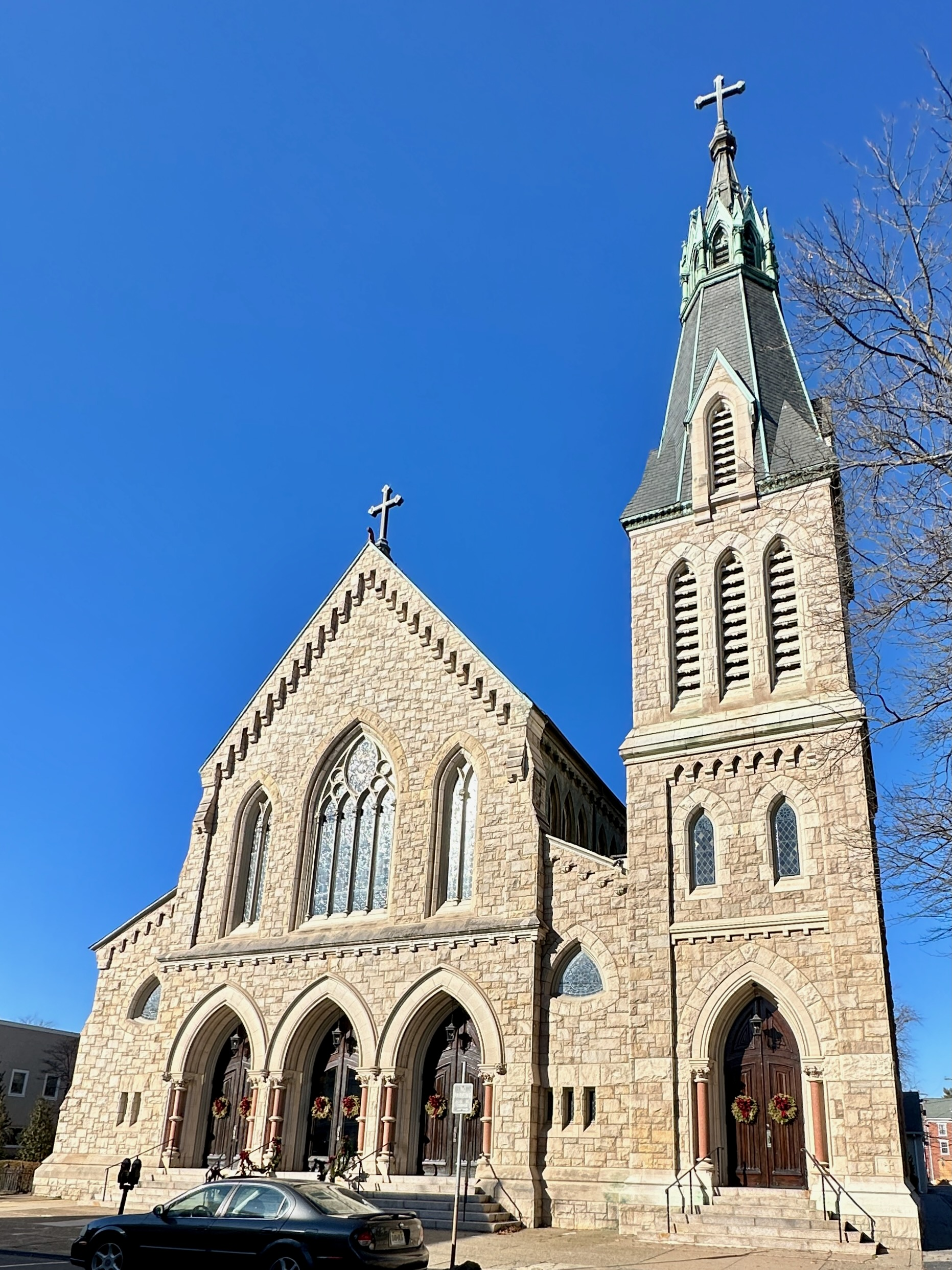
St. John the Evangelist Roman Catholic Church, Lambertville, New Jersey

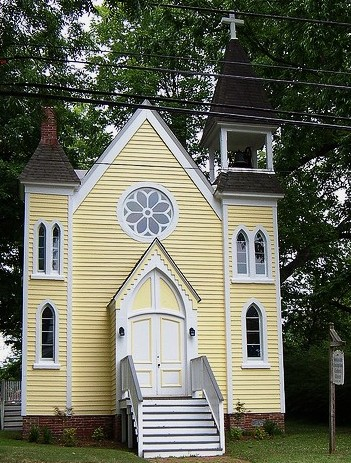
Church of the Immaculate Conception, Halifax, North Carolina.

- St. Nicholas of Tolentine Church, Atlantic City, New Jersey
- Centenary Methodist Episcopal church, Lambertville, New Jersey.
- St. John the Evangelist Roman Catholic Church, Lambertville, New Jersey.
- Church of the Immaculate Conception (NRHP), 145 S. King St., Halifax, North Carolina.
- Summit Country Day School, Cincinnati, Ohio
- Trinity College (now Trinity Washington University), Washington, D.C.; also art gallery and Trinity Hall.
