= Girard Avenue Historic District =

Historic district in Pennsylvania, United States

- U.S. National Register of Historic Places
- U.S. Historic district
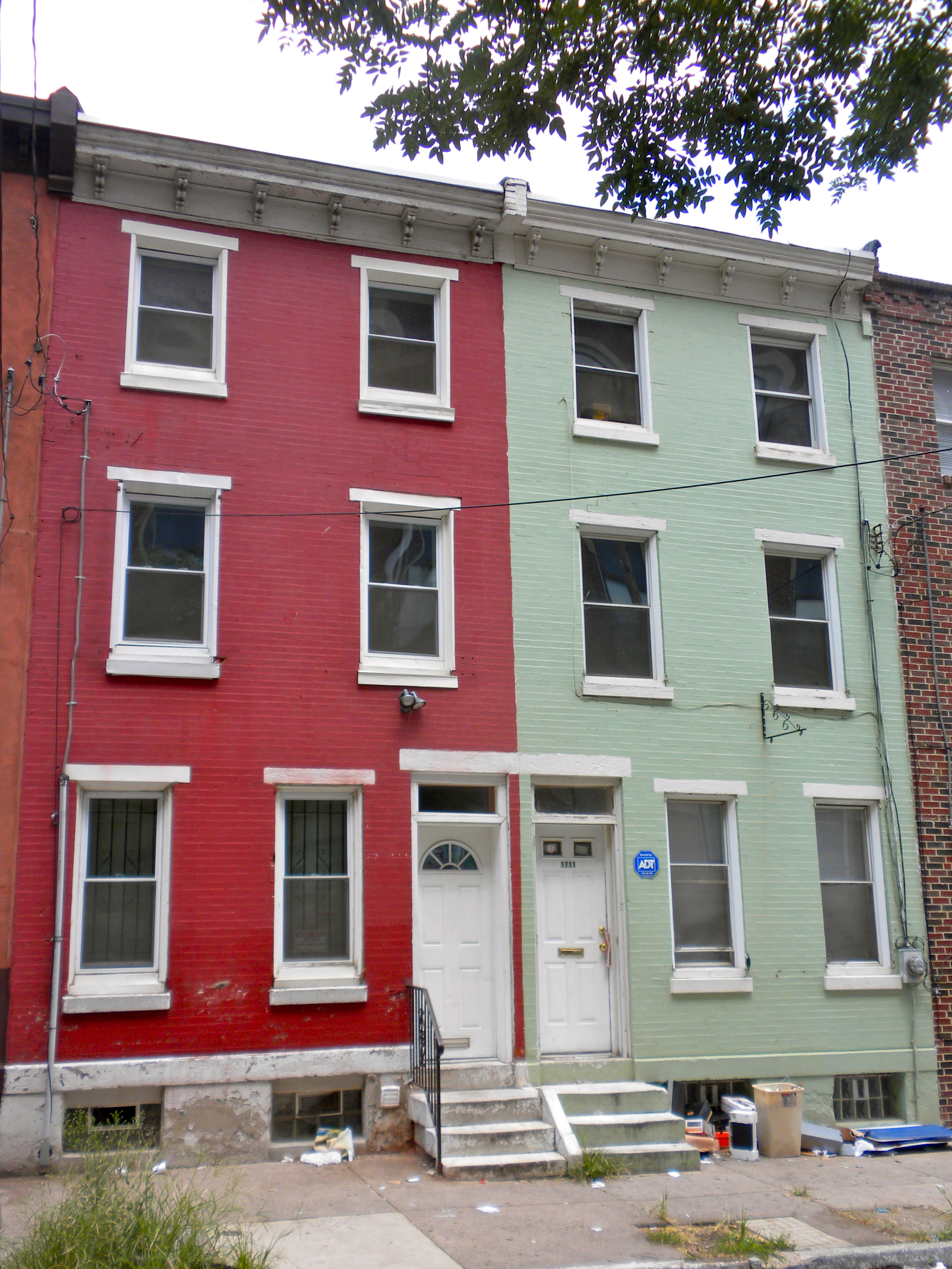
- Houses in the Girard Avenue Historic District, August 2010

- Location within Philadelphia Location within Pennsylvania Location within the United States
- Location: 1415-2028 Girard Ave. and 1700 blk. of Thompson St., Philadelphia, Pennsylvania
- Coordinates: 39°58′21″N 75°09′36″W
- Area: 15 acres (6.1 ha)
- Architect: E.F. Durang, et al.
- Architectural style: Greek Revival, Late Victorian, Beaux Arts
- NRHP reference No.: 85003427
- Added to NRHP: October 31, 1985

The Girard Avenue Historic District is a national historic district which is located in the Cabot neighborhood of Philadelphia, Pennsylvania, United States.

It was added to the National Register of Historic Places in 1985.

== History and architectural features ==
This district encompasses one hundred and thirty-seven contributing buildings, which were largely built during the mid- to late-19th century and consisted of residential, commercial, and industrial properties.

The residential buildings include blocks of nineteenth century speculative rowhouses. Residential buildings include notable examples of the Greek Revival, Late Victorian, and Beaux Arts styles.

Notable non-residential buildings include the Church of the Gesú (1879), designed by Edwin Forrest Durang, and Northwestern National Bank (1886).
