= St. Agatha–St. James Church =

Church in Philadelphia, Pennsylvania, United States

St. Agatha–St. James Catholic Church
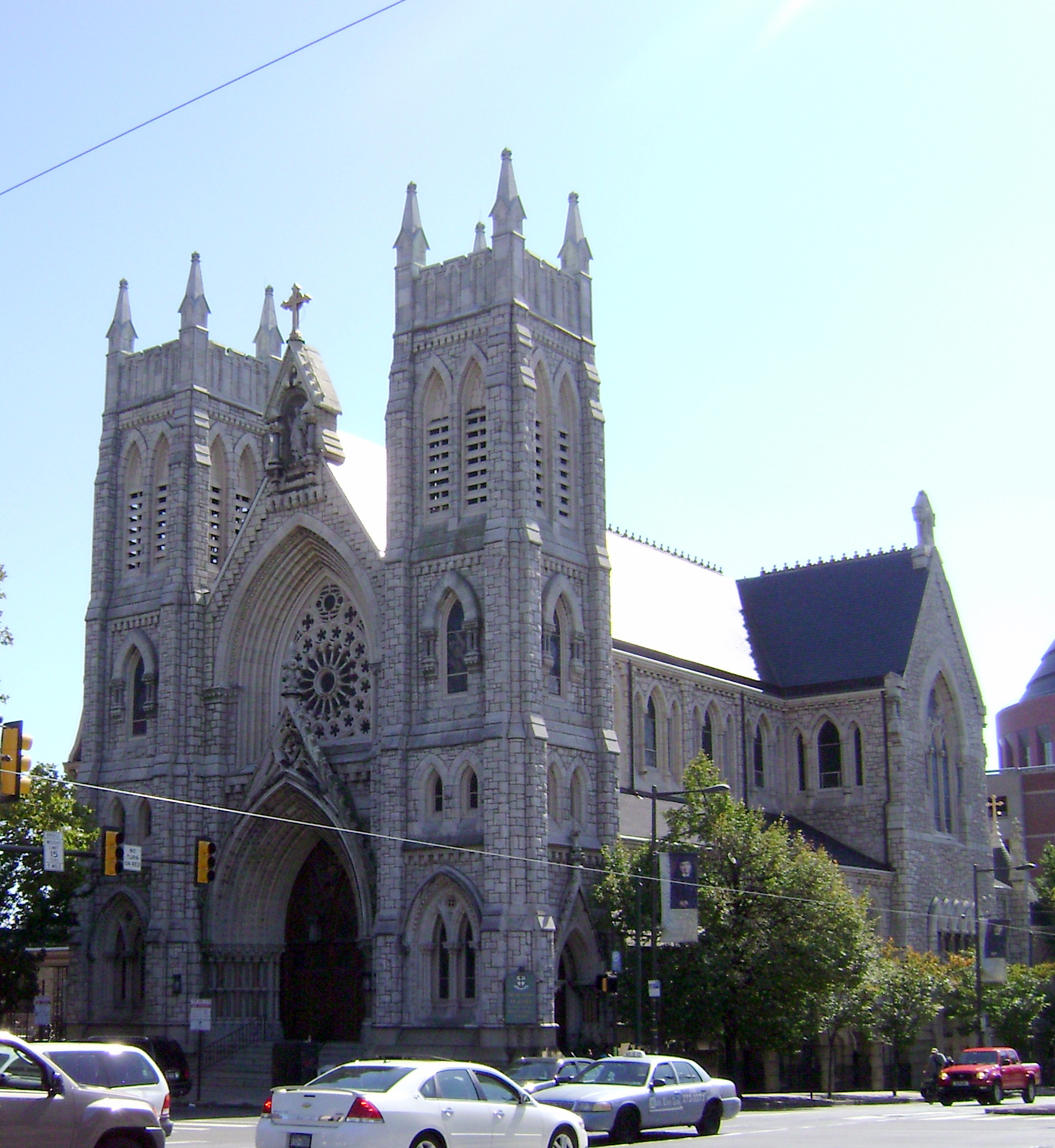

Religion
- Affiliation: Roman Catholic Church
- Leadership: Father Remigio Morales (pastor), Father Carlos Keen, Deacon Michael Gokie
- Year consecrated: 1887
- Status: Active

Location
- Location: 38th and Chestnut Streets, Philadelphia, Pennsylvania, United States
- Interactive map of St. Agatha–St. James Catholic Church
- Coordinates: 39.954836°N 75.198142°W

Architecture
- Architect: Edwin Forrest Durang
- Groundbreaking: 1881
- Completed: 1887

Specifications
- Capacity: 650
- Height (max): 75'

St. Agatha–St. James Church (formerly St. James Church) is a Roman Catholic church in Philadelphia, Pennsylvania, established in 1850. As the first Roman Catholic parish in Philadelphia west of the Schuylkil River, St. Agatha–St. James Church is the mother church of West Philadelphia. Originally, a small church dedicated to St James the Greater was constructed in an open field at 38th and Chestnut Streets (then known as Mary and James Streets), but with the rapid influx of Catholics into the area, particularly from Ireland, the decision was made to build a larger church on the same land. Construction of the current building, designed by Philadelphia architect Edwin Forrest Durang, began on October 16, 1881 and was completed on the same day in 1887. The hand-carved wooden confessionals from the original 1850 church were placed in the new building and remain to this day.

The name of the parish was changed to St Agatha-St James in 1976, following a merger with the nearby St. Agatha's Church (at 38th and Spring Garden Streets in Powelton Village). The old St Agatha's Church had suffered multiple fires, which coupled with the decline in the parish population, precipitated the decision to merge the two parishes.

The current church has undergone various renovations over its history. The original structure featured strikingly asymmetrical towers, with the left tower having a circular profile and conical pinnacle. In 1930, the circular tower was reprofiled to match the square tower on the right side of the church, producing the symmetrical profile that is seen today. At the same time, electrical lighting was added to the interior of the church for the first time. A further renovation occurred in 2003, with the interior repainted in a simpler and less colorful design. The traditional altar rail was removed, and a large ambo was installed. In 2018-2019, the lower level of the church was renovated into a cafeteria and events space, the old school building was renovated to serve as a student ministry and office space, and link was built connecting the church to the old school building.

A three-story parochial school was built behind the church during the 1920s. The school remained in operation for several decades before closing in the 1970s due to declining enrollment. For a time, the old school building was leased as office space to the University of Pennsylvania. In 2019, the old school building was further renovated and became the home of the Newman Centers for both the University of Pennsylvania and Drexel University, following the sale of the former Newman Center building next door. The Newman Center at the University of Pennsylvania, founded in 1893 as the first such community inspired by St John Henry Newman, had operated independently of the parish since inception, despite being located next door since 1970. In 2010, the Newman Center was merged with the parish following the sale of the building at 33 S 33rd St with had housed Drexel Newman Center (established 1921), placing all three entities under the same leadership for the first time.

In 2014, then-Archbishop Charles Chaput invited the Sodalitium Christianae Vitae (SCV), a society of apostolic life based in Peru commonly referred to as the Sodalits, to operate the combined parish and Newman community. St Agatha-St James became the second house for the Sodalits in the United States, the first being located in Denver. In 2025 Pope Francis disbanded the Sodalits The brothers associated with the Sodalits continue to operate the parish and Newman community, with the current administrative pastor Father Remigio Morales. Former lead pastor, Father Carlos Keen, currently serves as parochial vicar and support to Father Morales.

== Education ==
The designated parish grade schools of the church are St. Francis de Sales School and St. Ignatius School. Previously Our Mother of Sorrows was designated as one of the grade schools serving the parish. Our Mother of Sorrows and St. Ignatius of Loyola have since merged into a single school operated by Independence Mission Schools, operated independently of the archdiocese.
