= Josef von Fodor =

Hungarian professor

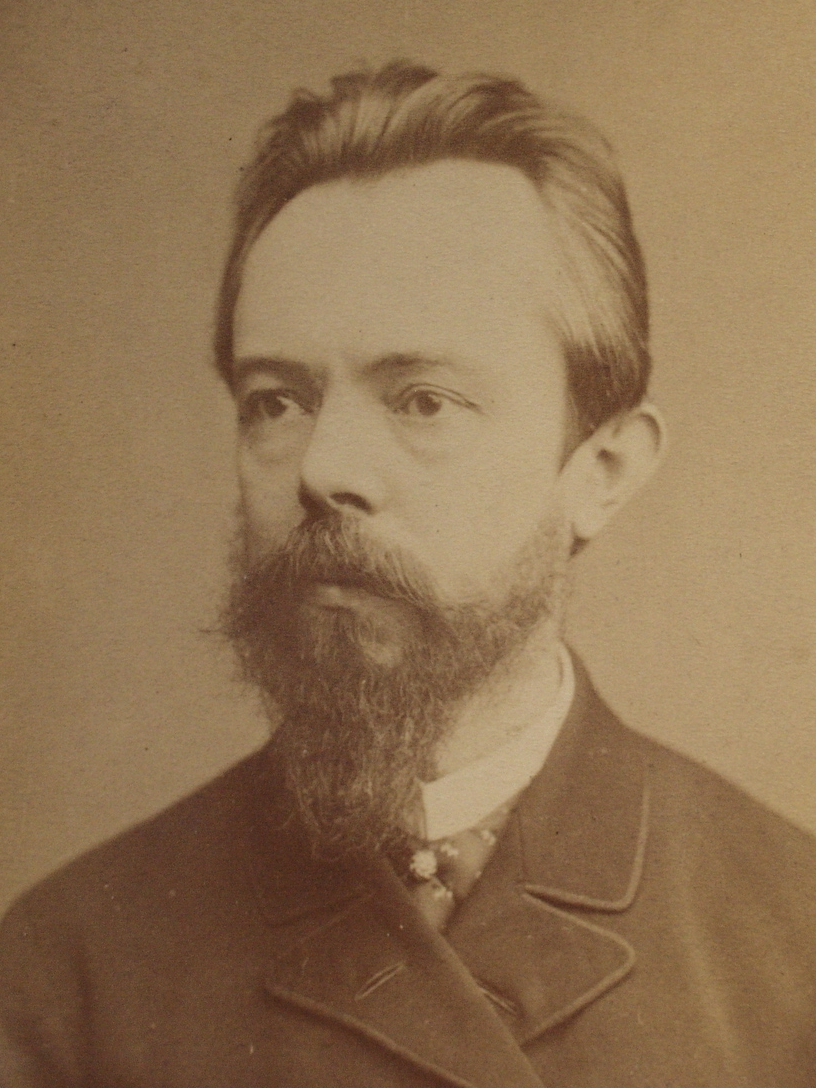
- Born: 16 July 1843; Lakócsa, Kingdom of Hungary
- Died: 19 March 1901 (aged 57)
- Education: Cistercian Grammar School; Eötvös Loránd University; University of Vienna; Ludwig-Maximilians-Universität München; University of Würzburg; University of Budapest
- Known for: Hygiene; Public health
- Scientific career
- Fields: Hygiene
- Doctoral advisors: János Rupp
- Other academic advisors: Max Josef von Pettenkofer; Justus von Liebig; Friedrich Daniel von Recklinghausen; Albert Hilger

Josef von Fodor de Galánta (Hungarian: galántai Fodor József; 16 July 1843 – 19 March 1901) was a Hungarian professor of hygiene at the University of Budapest and pioneer of public health.

== Early life and education ==
Birth

Josef von Fodor was born on 16 July 1843 in Lakócsa, Somogy County of Hungary.

=== Family ===
Josef's father was Galántai Fodor Antal [Hu] and his mother was Mary Picha. He had a daughter, Margit Fodor who married Zsigmond Gerlóczy.

=== Education ===
He studied medicine at the University of Budapest, the University of Vienna, and the Ludwig-Maximilians-Universität München and was awarded Doctor of Medicine (MD) from Budapest on 19 October 1865. He completed a degree as a master of ophthalmology and obstetrics, and on 17 July 1866 he completed a degree in surgery.

Around 1870, von Fodor took a Wanderjahr with the support of a state grant to visit the largest cities of Europe (Austria, Germany, Netherlands, Belgium, England) to study their hygiene practices.

=== Death ===
Von Fodor died on 19 Mar 1901 from sequelae of influenza supervening on arterial sclerosis He is buried at Rijeka Road Graveyard.

== Career ==
Von Fodor made significant contributions in teaching hygiene, investigating the connection between public health and conditions of water and air, and also studied many other projects including disinfectants and the effects of carbon monoxide, which he introduced the first quantitative analytical method for determining carboxyhemoglobin saturation. Von Fodor was among the first to demonstrate the spread of typhoid through water. In 1886, he reported the in vivo bactericidal activity of the blood, concluding that the organism was protected against the spread of bacteria by an unknown vital power of blood, and in 1887 he demonstrated in vitro that whole blood is able to reduce anthrax bacilli.

It has also been suggested that von Fodor was the first to suggest establishing a National Institute for Public Health and a Regional Institute of Public Health and Epidemiology.

=== Appointments ===
- 1866 - Assistant to the Chair of State Medicine at Budapest
- c. 1866 - Inspector of Deaths in Budapest
- 1869 - Prosector/dissecting doctor of the Hospital of St. Roch. (Saint Rokus)
- 1869 - qualified as Privat-docent
- 1870 - Studied at the Ludwig-Maximilians-Universität München under Max Josef von Pettenkofer and Justus von Liebig
- c. 1870 - Worked at Friedrich Daniel von Recklinghausen and Albert Hilger’s institute at the University of Würzburg
- 1872 - appointed Ordinary Professor of State Medicine at University of Klausenburg (or University of Kolozsvár)
- 1874 - appointed Chair of Hygiene at the University of Buda-Pesth
- c. 1890 - elected Dean of the Faculty of Medicine
- 1894 - elected Rector of the university

=== Achievements ===
As the Chair of Hygiene, von Fodor influenced sanitation reform throughout Hungary.

In 1885, von Fodor played a key role in founding the Institution of School of Medical Officers, and established the Hungarian National Health Association with Lajos Markusovszky.

He served as editor of the Bulletin of the Society of Public Health "Health" from 1887, and edited a section of the Hungarian Medical Journal called Public Health and Forensic Medicine. Von Fodor was regarded as a pioneer of modern public health.

=== Awards and honors ===
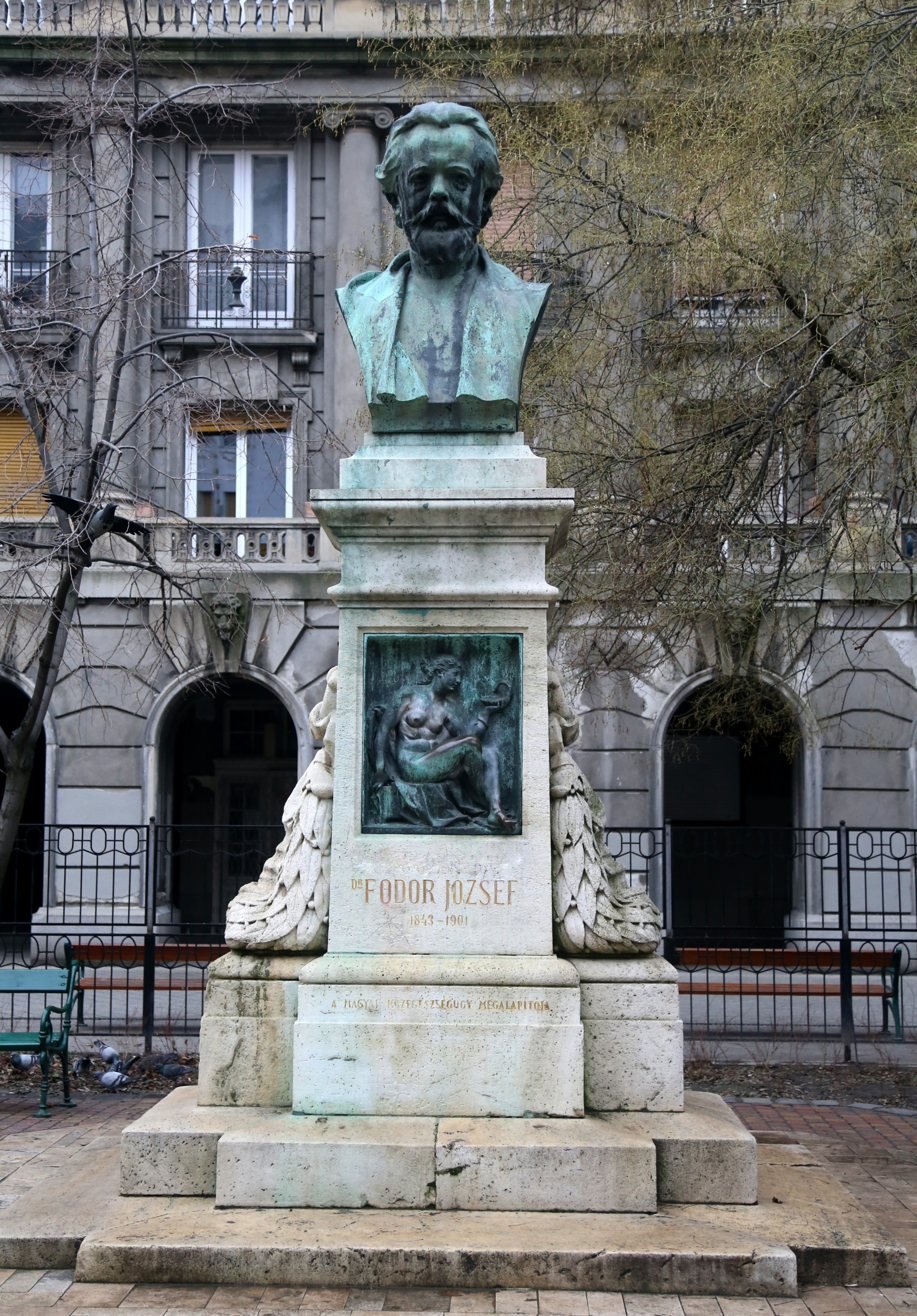
Statue of Josef von Fodor

- 1874 - Great Prize of the Hungarian Academy of Sciences
- 1883 - Hygienic Exhibition (Berlin), awarded Empress-Queen Augusta gold medal for preventative medicine
- 1891 - International Congress of Hygiene (London), awarded honorary degree of LL.D. from University of Cambridge
- Honorary member of the German Public Health Association (Verein fur Offentliche Gesundheitspflege)
- Member of public health associations of Paris, Brussels, Florence and London
- prizes from the Hungarian Academy of Sciences and Royal Medical Association of Budapest
- appointed to the Presidents of the Superior Health Council of Hungary
- Honorary member of the Association of Medical Officers of Great Britain
- nominated for the Nobel Prize in Physiology or Medicine by Andreas Hoegyes and by Anton von Genersich
- 1909 - on 29 August 1909 the National Public Health Association erected a bronze bust (the work of György Vastagh Jr.) in the capital, in the VIII. district Gutenberg Square, with the inscription “First Apostle of Our Public Health” engraved on the sculpture foundation. In Kaposvár, a full-length bronze statue, in its native village, Lakócsa, Somogy county, also a bust and a memorial plaque mark the memory of the famous native of the village.

=== Publications ===
- 1869 - About outside toilet systems with regard to domestic conditions, especially of Pest, 1869
- 1873 - Sanitary Administration in England / Public health in England with regard to the situation of medicine, health regulations, forensic medicine and the conditions in Hungary.
- 1875 - on soil and soil gases
- 1877 - Healthy houses and dwellings
- 1878 - Das gesunde Haus und die gesunde Wohnung. Braunschweig,
- 1878 - Official report on the universal exhibition held in Paris in 1878 III
- 1879 - The Public Health. Bp
- 1880 - Das Kohlenoxyd vom hygienischen Standpunkt. Pest. med. chir. Presse, Budapest, 1880, xvi, 42
- 1881 - Hygienische Untersuchungen über Luft, Boden und Wasser : insbesondere auf ihre Beziehungen zu den epidemischen Krankheiten. Erste Abtheilung: Die Luft [Hygienic Researches on Air, Soil, and Water volume 1: Air] (in German). Braunschweig: Freidrich Vieweg und Sohn. 1882.
- 1882 - Hygienische Untersuchungen über Luft, Boden und Wasser : insbesondere auf ihre Beziehungen zu den epidemischen Krankheiten. Zweite Abtheilung: Boden und Wasser [Hygienic Researches on Air, Soil, and Water volume 2: Earth and Water] (in German). Braunschweig: Freidrich Vieweg und Sohn. 1882.
- 1885 - the conditions of longevity
- 1886 - Bacterien im blute lebender thiere. [Bacteria in the blood of living animals] Archiv für Hygiene, 4:129-148
- 1887 - Fodor, Josef (1887). "Die Fähigkeit des Blutes Bacterien zu vernichten" [The ability of the blood to destroy bacteria]. Deutsche Medizinische Wochenschrift (in German). 13 (34): 745–747. doi:10.1055/s-0029-1197913. S2CID 260126483.
- 1887 - textbook for hygiene schools (2nd ed. 1892)
- 1890 - the bactericidal action of the blood and immunization
- 1891 - immunization by alkalinization
