= Büchner =

Büchner (or Buechner) is a German language surname related to the word Buche (German: beech) and may refer to:

- Eberhard Büchner (born 1939), German tenor
- Ernst Büchner (1850–1925), German chemist after whom the Büchner flask and Büchner funnel are named
- Franz Büchner (1898–1920), German First World War flying ace
- Georg Büchner (1813–1837), German writer and playwright
- Joachim Büchner (1905–1978), German athlete
- Ludwig Büchner (1824–1899), German philosopher
- Wolfgang Büchner (canoeist), German slalom canoeist
- Wolfgang Büchner (journalist) (born 1966), German journalist

In the anglicized spelling "Buechner", it may refer to:

- Frederick Buechner (1926–2022), American author and minister
- Jack Buechner (1940–2020), American lawyer and politician
- John C. Buechner (1934–2018), American educator and politician
- Karl Buechner (born 1971), American metalcore vocalist
- Margaret Buechner (1922–1998), a German-born, American composer
- Sara Davis Buechner (born David Buechner, 1959), American concert pianist

== See also ==
- Buchner
- Georg Büchner Prize, one of the most important literary prizes for German language literature
