= Buchner =

Buchner is a German surname. Notable people with this surname include the following:

- Andreas Buchner (1776–1854), German historian
- Annemarie Buchner (1924–2014), German Olympian
- August Buchner (1591–1661), German influential Baroque poet
- Eduard Buchner (1860–1917), German chemist and zymologist
- Edward Franklin Buchner (1868–1929), American psychologist
- Ernst Buchner (curator) (1892–1962), German museum administrator
- Hans Buchner (1483–1538, German organist and composer
- Hans Ernst August Buchner (1850–1902), German bacteriologist
- Hermann Buchner (pilot) (1919–2005), Austrian-born Luftwaffe military aviator
- Johann Andreas Buchner (1783–1852), German pharmacologist
- Ludwig Andreas Buchner (1813–1897), German pharmacologist
- Paul Buchner (1531–1607), German architect, geometer, carpenter, and screw maker
- Tyler Buchner (born 2002), American football player

== See also ==
- Büchner
