= Albert Hilger =

German chemist and pharmacologist (1839–1905)

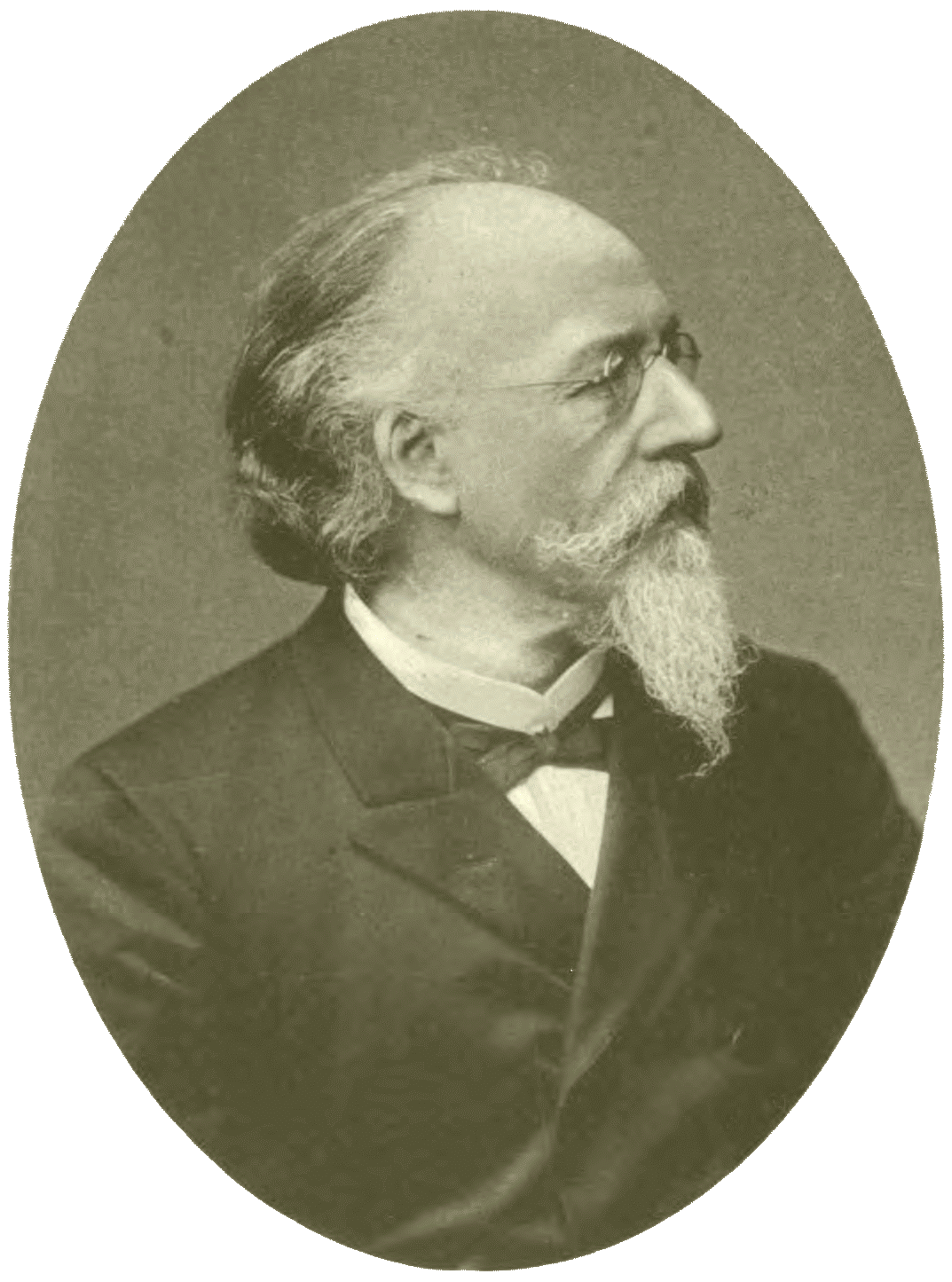
Albert Hilger

Albert Hilger (2 May 1839 in Homburg – 18 May 1905 in Possenhofen) was a German pharmacologist and chemist, known for his work in the field of food chemistry.

He worked as a pharmacy assistant in the cities of Mannheim, Karlsruhe and Saarbrücken, and studied mathematics and sciences at the Polytechnic in Karlsruhe. In 1860, he continued his education at the University of Würzburg, receiving his PhD two years later at Heidelberg University. Later on, he spent several years as an assistant to chemist Johann Joseph Scherer at the University of Würzburg.

In 1868, he established a private agricultural-chemistry laboratory, and during the following year, obtained his habilitation at the University of Würzburg. In 1872, he became an associate professor of pharmacy and applied chemistry at the University of Erlangen, where in 1875 he attained a full professorship. In 1892, he succeeded Ludwig Andreas Buchner as a professor at the Ludwig-Maximilians-Universität München.

== Selected works ==
- Ueber die Verbindungen des Jod mit den Pflanzenalcaloiden; ein Beitrag zum Nachweis der Alcaloide, 1869 – On the compounds of iodine with plant alkaloids; a contribution to the detection of alkaloids.
- Vereinbarungen betreffs der Untersuchung und Beurteilung von Nahrungs- und Genussmitteln sowie Gebrauchsgegenständen, 1885 – Agreements involving the inspection and assessment of food products and consumer goods.
- Vierteljahresschift über die fortschritte auf dem gebiete der chemie der nahrungs- und genussmittel, 1887 – Quarterly on progress in the areas of food and beverage chemistry.
- Studien über die bestimmung des coffeïns in den samen der kaffeepflanze und in den theeblättern, 1897 – Studies on the determination of caffeine in the seeds of the coffee plant, etc.
