= Liberty Bell =

Symbol of American independence and liberty

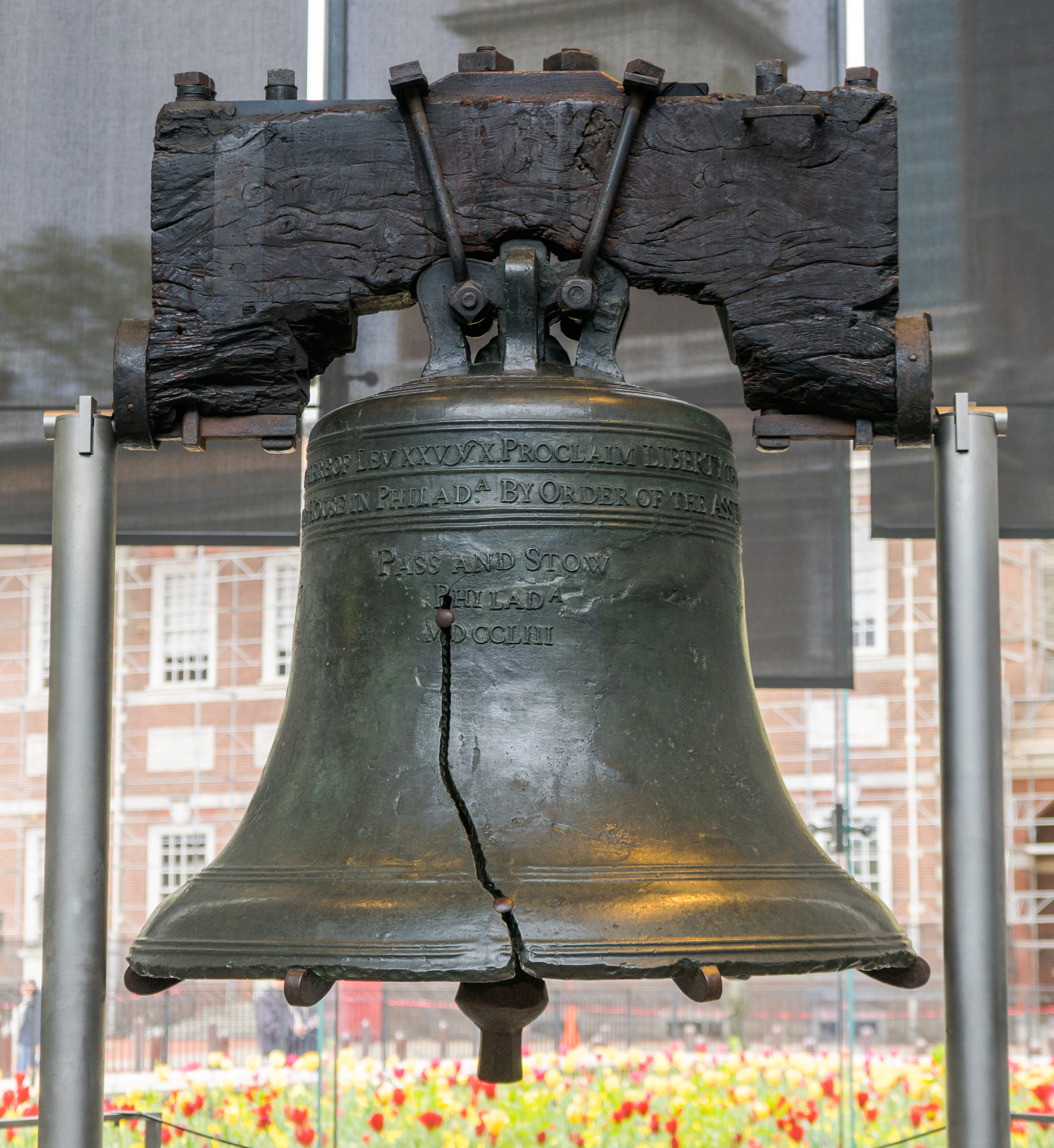
- The Liberty Bell outside Independence Hall in Philadelphia in April 2017
- Interactive map pinpointing the bell's location
- Location: Liberty Bell Center, Independence National Historical Park, Philadelphia, Pennsylvania, U.S.
- Coordinates: 39°56′58″N 75°9′1″W
- Designer: Whitechapel Bell Foundry
- Type: Tower bell
- Material: 70% copper, 20% tin, 10% other metals
- Width: 3.82 ft (1.16 m) (circumference is 12 ft (3.7 m) around the lip, 7.5 ft (2.3 m) around the crown)
- Height: About 4 ft (1.2 m)
- Completion date: 1752; 274 years ago
- Website: Liberty Bell Center
- Weight: 2,080 pounds (940 kg)

The Liberty Bell, previously called the State House Bell or Old State House Bell, is an iconic symbol of American independence, located in Philadelphia. It was first called the Liberty Bell by members of the American abolitionist movement, who used it as a symbol. Originally placed in the steeple of the Pennsylvania State House (now known as Independence Hall), the Liberty Bell today is located across the street from Independence Hall in the Liberty Bell Center in Independence National Historical Park.

The bell was commissioned in 1752 by the Pennsylvania Provincial Assembly from the London-based firm Lester and Pack, later renamed the Whitechapel Bell Foundry, and was cast with the lettering "Proclaim LIBERTY Throughout all the Land unto all the Inhabitants Thereof". The bell first cracked when rung after its arrival in Philadelphia, and was twice recast by local workmen John Pass and John Stow, whose surnames appear on the bell. In its early years, the bell was used to summon lawmakers to legislative sessions and to alert citizens to public meetings and proclamations. It is likely that the Liberty Bell was among the bells in Philadelphia to ring on July 8, 1776, when the Declaration of Independence was first read to the public, although no contemporary account of the ringing is known to exist, and the association of the bell with the American Revolution did not begin until 1847, a decade after it was adopted by the abolitionists, who dubbed it the Liberty Bell.

In the 1830s, it was adopted as a symbol by abolitionist societies, who dubbed it the "Liberty Bell". It acquired its distinctive large crack sometime in the first half of the 19th century—a widespread story claims it cracked while ringing after the death of Chief Justice John Marshall in 1835. In the late 19th and early 20th century, it was several times sent on journeys to large expositions, and was further damaged by souvenir hunters.

After World War II, Philadelphia allowed the National Park Service to take custody of the bell, while retaining ownership. The bell was used as a symbol of freedom during the Cold War and was a popular site for protests in the 1960s. It was moved from its longtime home in Independence Hall to a nearby glass pavilion on Independence National Historical Park in 1976, and then to the larger Liberty Bell Center adjacent to the pavilion in 2003. The bell has been featured on coins and stamps, and its name and image have been widely used by corporations.

== History ==
=== Founding (1751–1753) ===
Philadelphia's city bell was used to alert the public to proclamations or civic danger since the city's 1682 founding. The original bell, hung from a tree behind the Pennsylvania State House, now known as Independence Hall, was brought to the city by its founder, William Penn. In 1751, with a bell tower being built in the Pennsylvania State House, civic authorities sought a bell of better quality that could be heard at a greater distance in the rapidly expanding city. Isaac Norris, speaker of the Pennsylvania Provincial Assembly, gave orders to the colony's London agent, Robert Charles, to obtain a "good Bell of about two thousands pound weight".

We hope and rely on thy care and assistance in this affair and that thou wilt procure and forward it by the first good opp^{o} as our workmen inform us it will be much less trouble to hang the Bell before their Scaffolds are struck from the Building where we intend to place it which will not be done 'till the end of next Summer or beginning of the Fall. Let the bell be cast by the best workmen & examined carefully before it is Shipped with the following words well shaped around it.

By Order of the Assembly of the Povince [sic] of Pensylvania [sic] for the State house in the City of Philada 1752

Underneath

Proclaim Liberty thro' all the Land to all the Inhabitants thereof.-Levit. XXV. 10.

The reference to Leviticus in Norris's directive reflects the contemporaneous practice of assigning unique qualities to bells that reflected their particular composition and casting.

==== Inscription ====
The inscription on the bell reads:

Proclaim LIBERTY Throughout all the Land unto all the Inhabitants Thereof Lev. XXV. v X.
By Order of the ASSEMBLY of the Province of PENSYLVANIA for the State House in Philad^{A}
Pass and Stow
Philad^{a}
MDCCLIII

At the time, "Pensylvania" was an accepted alternative spelling for Pennsylvania. In 1787, the spelling was used by Alexander Hamilton, a Founding Father and the first U.S. Treasury Secretary, on the signature page of the Constitution of the United States.

Robert Charles ordered the bell from Thomas Lester of the London bell-founding firm of Lester and Pack, later known as the Whitechapel Bell Foundry, for £150 13s 8d, (equivalent to £28,331 in 2025) including freight to Philadelphia and insurance on its transport. It arrived in Philadelphia in August 1752.

Norris wrote to Charles that the bell was in good order, but they had not yet sounded it, since they were building a clock for the State House's tower. The bell was mounted on a stand to test the sound, and at the first strike of the clapper, the bell's rim cracked. The episode was used to good account in later stories of the bell; in 1893, President Benjamin Harrison, speaking as the bell passed through Indianapolis, said, "This old bell was made in England, but it had to be recast in America before it was attuned to proclaim the right of self-government and the equal rights of men." Philadelphia authorities tried to return it by ship, but the master of the vessel that had brought it was unable to take it on board.

Two local founders, John Pass and John Stow, offered to recast the bell. Though they were inexperienced in bell casting, Pass headed the Mount Holly Iron Foundry in neighboring Mount Holly, New Jersey, and came from Malta, which had a tradition of bell casting. Stow was only four years out of his apprenticeship as a brass founder. At Stow's foundry on 2nd Street in Philadelphia, the bell was broken into small pieces, melted down, and cast into a new bell. The two founders decided that the metal was too brittle, and augmented the bell metal by about ten percent, using copper. By March 1753, the bell was ready, and Norris reported that the lettering, which included the founders' names and the year, was even clearer on the new bell than on the old.

City officials in Philadelphia scheduled a public celebration with free food and drink for the testing of the recast bell. When the bell was struck, it did not break, but the sound produced was described by one hearer as similar to that of two coal scuttles being banged together. Mocked by the crowd, Pass and Stow hastily took the bell away to again recast it. In June 1753, the recasting was completed, and the sound was deemed satisfactory, though Norris indicated that he did not personally like it. The bell was hung in the steeple of the State House the same month.

The reason for the difficulties with the bell is not certain. The Whitechapel Foundry took the position that the bell was either damaged in transit or was broken by an inexperienced bell ringer, who incautiously sent the clapper flying against the rim, rather than the body of the bell.

In 1975, the Winterthur Museum in Delaware conducted an analysis of the metal in the bell, concluding that "a series of errors made in the construction, reconstruction, and second reconstruction of the Bell resulted in a brittle bell that barely missed being broken up for scrap". The Museum found a considerably higher level of tin in the Liberty Bell than in other Whitechapel bells of that era, and suggested that Whitechapel made an error in the alloy, perhaps by using scraps with a high level of tin to begin the melt instead of the usual pure copper.

The analysis concluded that, on the second recasting, instead of adding pure tin to the bell metal, Pass and Stow added cheap pewter with a high lead content, and incompletely mixed the new metal into the mold. The result was "an extremely brittle alloy which not only caused the Bell to fail in service but made it easy for early souvenir collectors to knock off substantial trophies from the rim".

=== American Revolution ===
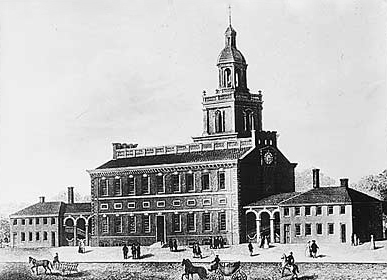
An illustration of the Pennsylvania State House, later renamed Independence Hall, as it appeared in the 1770s

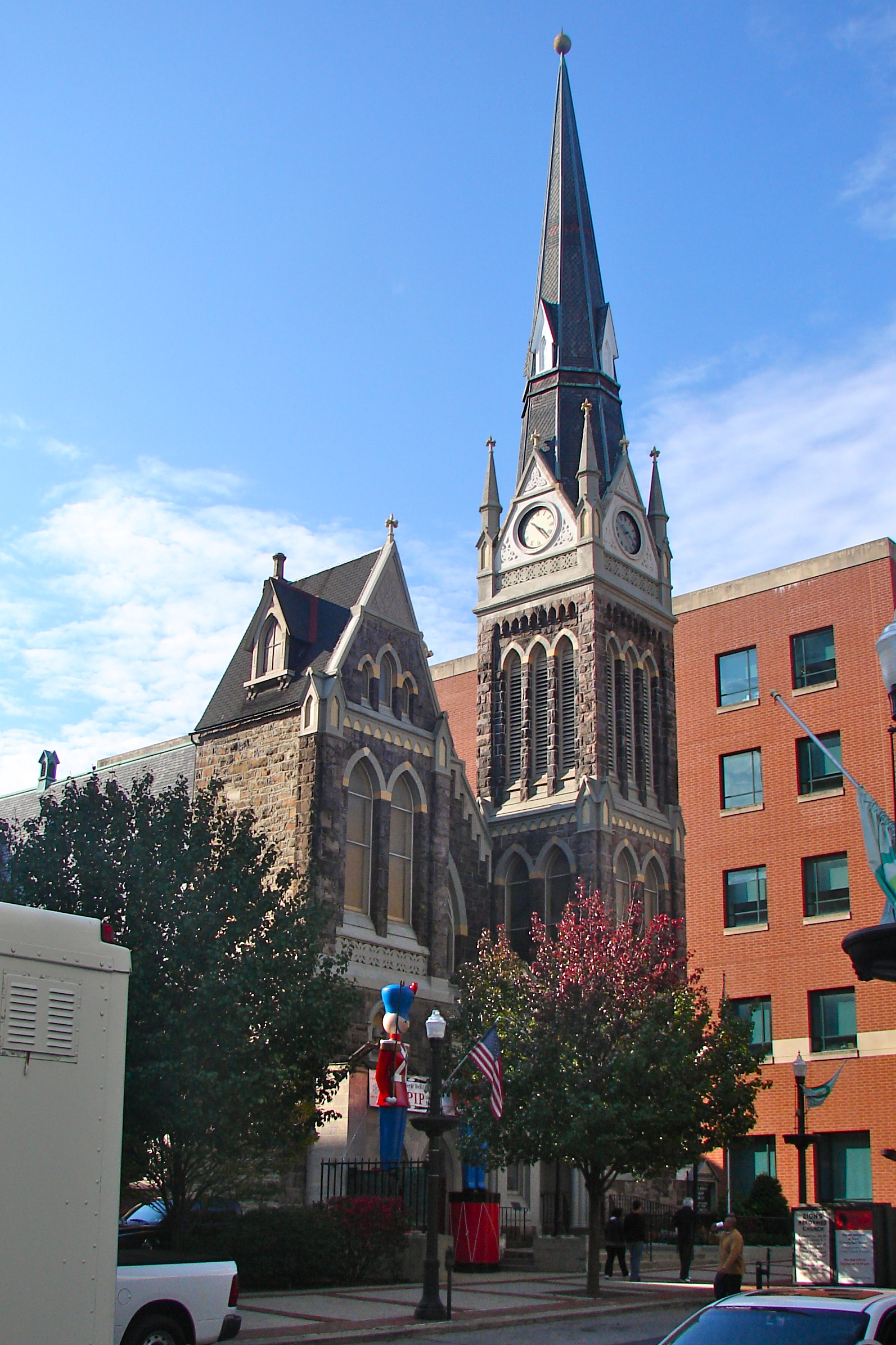
Zion United Church of Christ in Allentown, Pennsylvania, where the Liberty Bell was hidden under floor boards during the British occupation of Philadelphia during the Revolutionary War

Dissatisfied with the bell, Norris instructed Charles to order a second one, and see if Lester and Pack would take back the first bell and credit the value of the metal towards the bill. In 1754, the Assembly decided to keep both bells; the new one was attached to the tower clock while the old bell was, by vote of the Assembly, devoted "to such Uses as this House may hereafter appoint." The Pass and Stow bell was used to summon the Assembly.

On October 16, 1755, in one of the earliest documented mentions of the bell's use, Benjamin Franklin wrote Catherine Ray a letter, which stated: "Adieu. The Bell rings, and I must go among the Grave ones, and talk Politiks. [sic]"

The bell was rung in 1760 to mark the accession of George III to the throne.

In the early 1760s, the Assembly allowed a local church to use the State House for services and the bell to summon worshipers, while the church's building was being constructed. The bell was also used to summon people to public meetings, and in 1772, a group of citizens complained to the Assembly that the bell was being rung too frequently.

Despite the legend that the Liberty Bell rang following the unanimous adoption of the Declaration of Independence by the Second Continental Congress on July 4, 1776, there is no evidence to support that, and it is unlikely since the first public readings of the Declaration of Independence were not until four days later, on July 8, 1776. There is historical documentation that when the Declaration was read publicly in Philadelphia, bells around the city were rung in commemoration. While the Liberty Bell is not specifically referenced, most historical authorities agree that it was likely among the bells that rang that day. However, there is some chance that the poor condition of the State House bell tower prevented the bell from ringing. According to John C. Paige, who wrote a historical study of the Liberty Bell for the National Park Service, "We do not know whether or not the steeple was still strong enough to permit the State House bell to ring on this day. If it could possibly be rung, we can assume it was. Whether or not it did, it has come to symbolize all of the bells throughout the United States which proclaimed Independence." If the Liberty Bell was rung, it was most likely rung by Andrew McNair, the doorkeeper to the Assembly and the Continental Congress, who was responsible for the bell's ringing. Bells were also rung to celebrate the first anniversary of Independence on July 4, 1777.

==== Hidden in Allentown ====
As the American Revolutionary War intensified, delegates to the Second Continental Congress, colonial era city officials, and Philadelphia citizens were acutely aware that the British Army would likely recast the bell into munitions if they were able to find and secure it. On September 11, 1777, these concerns escalated after George Washington and the Continental Army were defeated in the Battle of Brandywine, leaving the revolutionary capital of Philadelphia defenseless. The city urgently prepared for an inevitable British attack, and it subsequently fell under British occupation. Prior to the city's fall to the British, the bell and other major bells in Philadelphia were hastily taken down from their towers, and sent by heavily guarded wagon train to Bethlehem and then to Zion German Reformed Church at 622 Hamilton Street in Allentown, Pennsylvania, then known as Northampton Towne. In Allentown, the bell was hidden under the church's floor boards just as the British entered and began their occupation of Philadelphia.

The bell remained hidden in Allentown for nine months. In June 1778, following the British retreat from Philadelphia on June 18, 1778, it was returned. Upon the bell's return to Philadelphia, the steeple of the State House was in poor condition, and was subsequently torn down and restored. The bell was placed in storage until 1785, when it was again mounted for ringing.

Following the victory of Washington and the Continental Army in the Revolutionary War, the bell was placed on an upper floor of State House, later named Independence Hall, where it was rung on Independence Day, on Washington's Birthday, and on election day to remind voters to hand in their ballots. It also rang to call students at the University of Pennsylvania to their classes at nearby Philosophical Hall. Between 1785 and 1799, when the Pennsylvania state capital was briefly moved to Lancaster, it was rung to summon state legislators into session. When Pennsylvania officials, having no further use for State House, proposed tearing it down and selling the land for building lots, the City of Philadelphia purchased the land, the State House, and the Liberty Bell, for $70,000, equal to $1,327,941 today.

=== 19th century ===
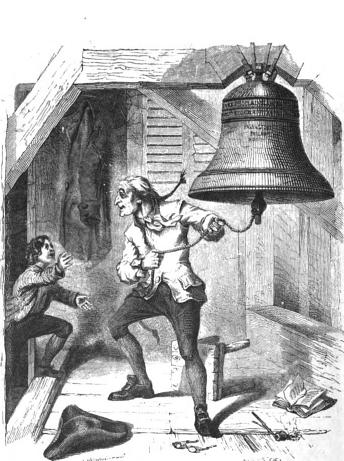
The Bellman Informed of the Passage of the Declaration of Independence, an 1854 illustration of the story of the Liberty Bell being rung on July 4, 1776

In 1828, the City of Philadelphia sold the second Lester and Pack bell to St. Augustine's Roman Catholic Church, which was burned down in 1844 by an anti-Catholic mob in the Philadelphia Nativist Riots. The remains of the bell were recast and then housed at Villanova University in nearby Villanova, Pennsylvania.

It is not definitively known when or how the Liberty Bell first came to be cracked, but it is known that the damage occurred sometime between 1817 and 1846 and likely toward the end of this period. In 1837, the bell was depicted in an anti-slavery publication, and no crack is identifiable in that image. Nine years later, in February 1846, the Public Ledger reported that the bell was rung the day following Washington's Birthday, on February 23, 1846. Since February 22 was a Sunday, the celebration occurred the next day. The newspaper reported that the bell had long been cracked, but had been "put in order" by having the sides of the crack filed. The paper reported that, around noon on February 23, 1846, it was discovered that the bell's ringing was causing the crack to be extended, and that "the old Independence Bell...now hangs in the great city steeple irreparably cracked and forever dumb."

The most common story about the cracking of the bell, which originated in 1876, is that it happened when the bell was rung upon the 1835 death of the Supreme Court Chief Justice John Marshall when the volunteer curator of Independence Hall, Colonel Frank Etting, announced that he had ascertained the truth of the bell's cracking. While there is little evidence to support Etting's view, it was widely accepted and taught. Other claims regarding the crack's origin include stories that it was damaged during welcoming ceremonies for Lafayette on his return to the United States in 1824, that it cracked announcing the passing of the British Roman Catholic Relief Act 1829, and that some boys had been invited to ring the bell and inadvertently damaged it. David Kimball, in a book authored for the National Park Service, suggests that it most likely cracked sometime between 1841 and 1845, during its ringing on either Independence Day or on Washington's Birthday.

Abolitionists in the antebellum period gave the bell its best-known name, as well as new meaning as an icon of protest against slavery. The Pass and Stow bell was first termed "The Liberty Bell" in Anti-Slavery Record, a journal published by the New York Anti-Slavery Society, which argued that "Hitherto, the bell has not obeyed the inscription and its peals have been a mockery, while one sixth of ‘all inhabitants’ are in abject slavery”. Two years later, in 1837, the society published another journal titled Liberty, with an image of the bell on its cover under the heading, "Proclaim Liberty". In 1839, William Lloyd Garrison's anti-slavery publication The Liberator reprinted a Boston abolitionist pamphlet containing a poem entitled "The Liberty Bell", which noted that, at that time, despite its inscription, the bell did not proclaim liberty to all the inhabitants of the land. That same year, Boston abolitionists led by Maria Weston Chapman began publishing an annual antislavery gift book called The Liberty Bell, which they sold at antislavery fairs to raise funds for the movement. Garrison, along with many other abolitionists including Frederick Douglass, also frequently invoked Leviticus 25:10, the biblical passage inscribed on the bell, to connect their movement with the idea of Jubilee.

A great part of the modern image of the bell as a relic of the proclamation of American independence was forged by writer George Lippard. On January 2, 1847, he published a short story, "Fourth of July, 1776", in the Saturday Courier. The short story depicted an aged bellman on July 4, 1776, sitting morosely by the bell, fearing that Congress would not have the courage to declare independence. At the most dramatic moment, a young boy appears with instructions for the old man: to ring the bell. It was subsequently published in Lippard's collected stories. The story was widely reprinted and closely linked the Liberty Bell to the Declaration of Independence in the public mind. The elements of the story were reprinted in early historian Benson J. Lossing's The Pictorial Field Guide to the Revolution (published in 1850) as historical fact, and the tale was widely repeated for generations after in school primers.

In 1848, with the rise of interest in the bell, the city decided to move it to the Assembly Room, also known as the Declaration Chamber, on the first floor, where the Declaration and United States Constitution had been debated and signed. The city constructed an ornate pedestal for the bell. The Liberty Bell was displayed on that pedestal for the next quarter-century, surmounted by an eagle (originally sculpted, later stuffed). In 1853, President Franklin Pierce visited Philadelphia and the bell, and spoke of the bell as symbolizing the American Revolution and American liberty. At the time, Independence Hall was also used as a courthouse, and African-American newspapers pointed out the incongruity of housing a symbol of liberty in the same building in which federal judges were holding hearings under the Fugitive Slave Act.

In February 1861, then President-elect Abraham Lincoln came to the Assembly Room and delivered an address en route to his inauguration in Washington, D.C. In 1865, Lincoln's body was returned to the Assembly Room after his assassination for a public viewing of his body, en route to his entombment in Springfield, Illinois. Due to time constraints, only a small fraction of those wishing to pass by the coffin were able to; the lines to see the coffin were never less than 3 miles (4.8 km) long. Nevertheless, between 120,000 and 140,000 people were able to pass by the open casket and then the bell, carefully placed at Lincoln's head so mourners could read the inscription, "Proclaim Liberty throughout all the land unto all the inhabitants thereof."

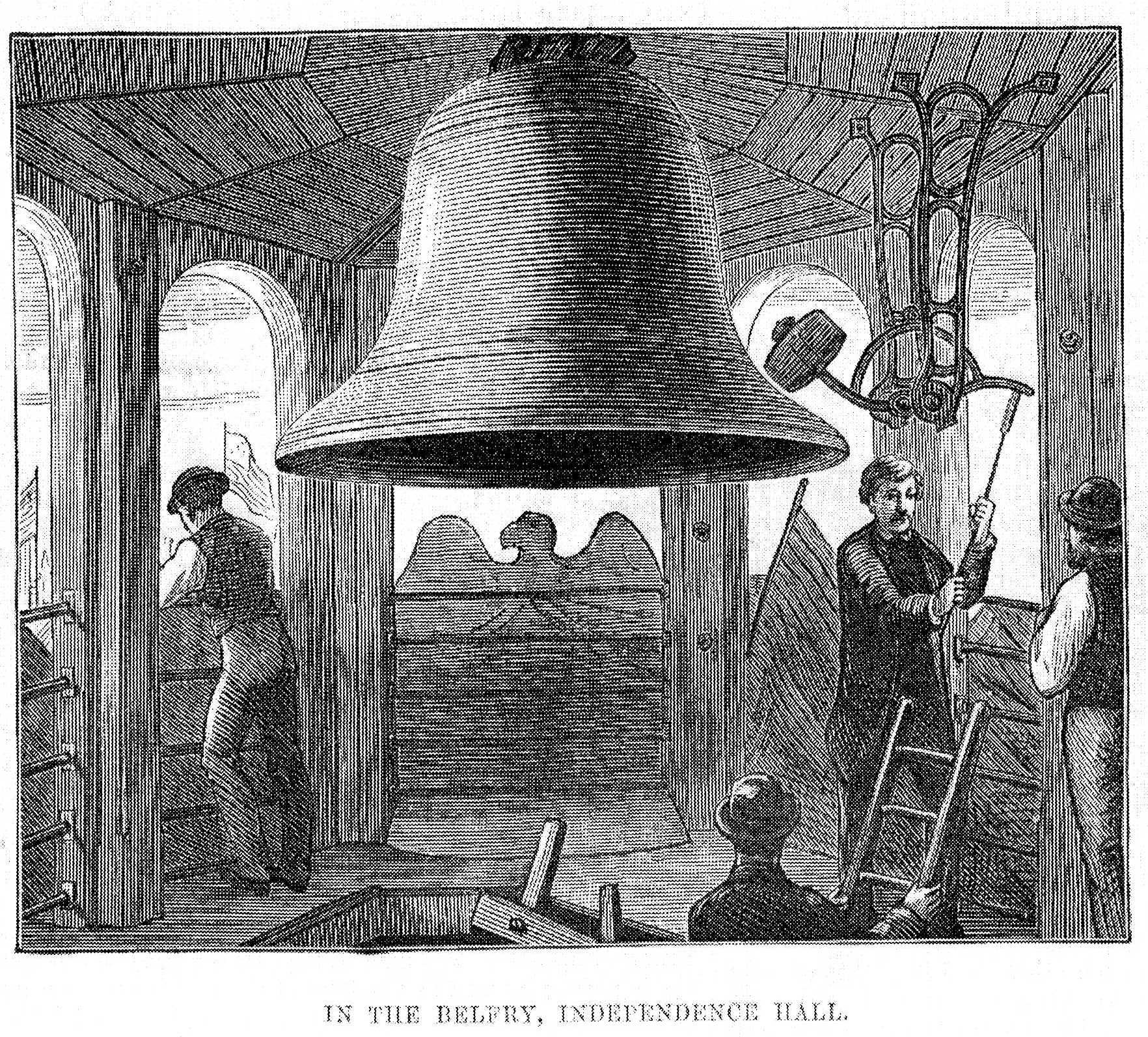
Centennial Bell in the Independence Hall Belfry, Philadelphia - Engraving from 1876

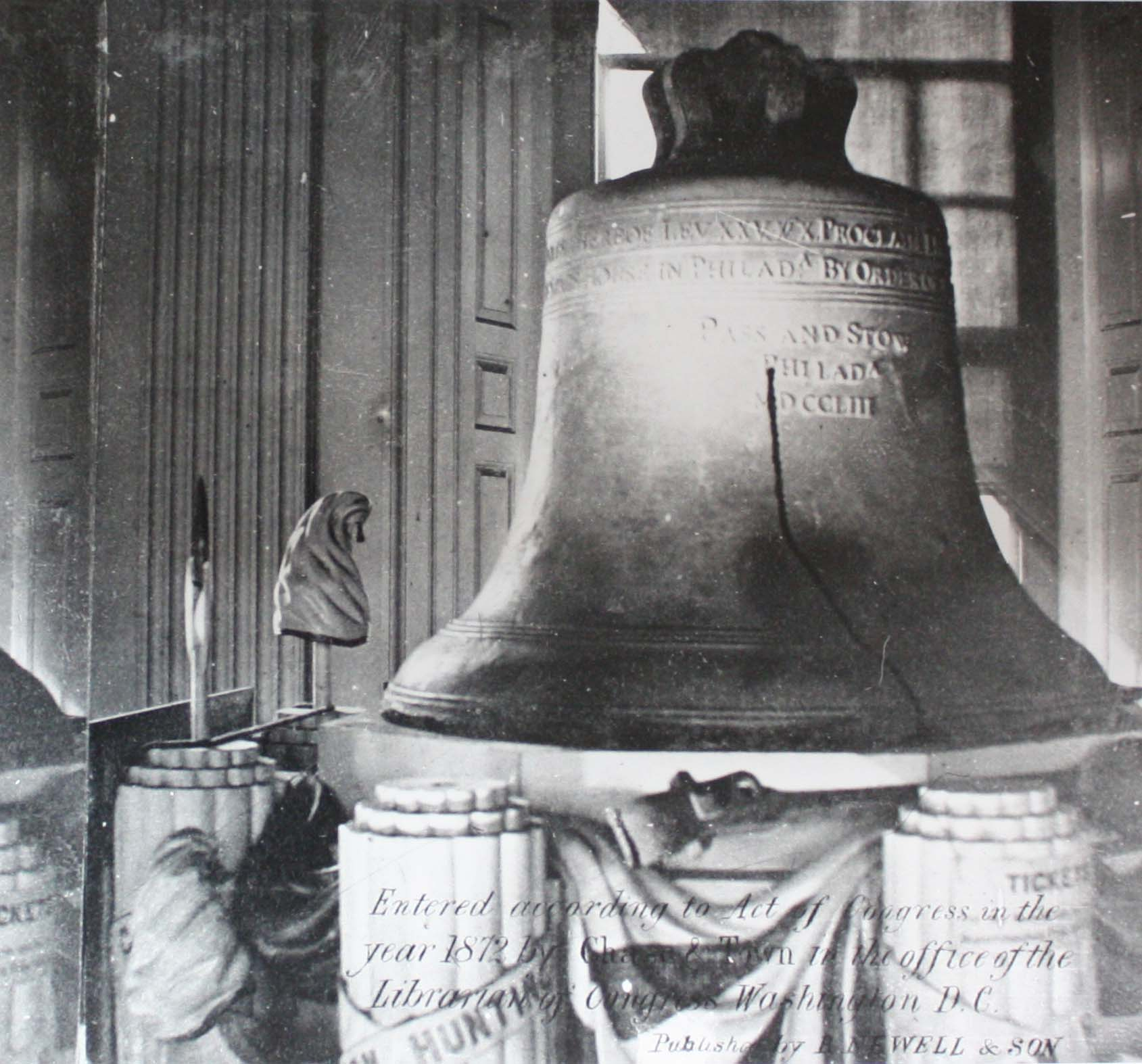
The Liberty Bell on its ornate stand in Independence Hall in 1872

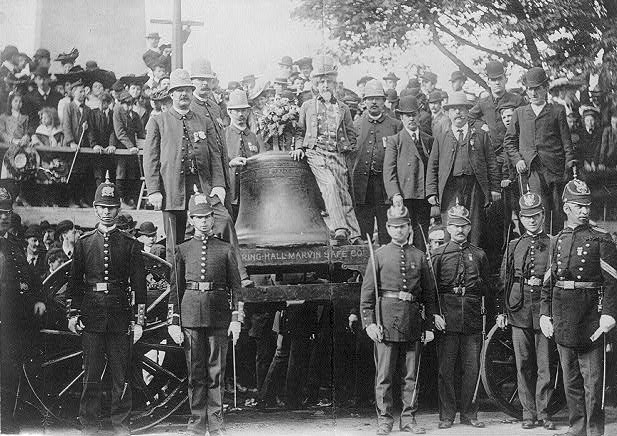
The Liberty Bell at Bunker Hill in Boston in 1903

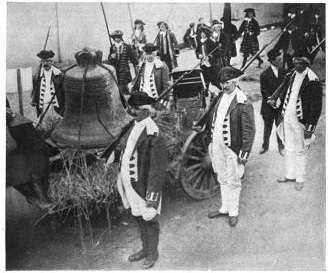
The Liberty Bell is paraded through the streets of Philadelphia in 1908, in a recreation of its September 1777 journey to Allentown just prior to the fall of Philadelphia to the British.

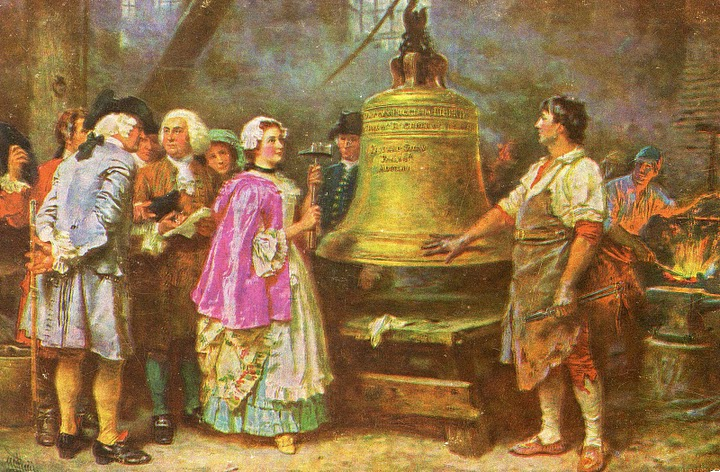
The Bell's First Note, a 1913 painting of the Liberty Bell by Jean Leon Gerome Ferris

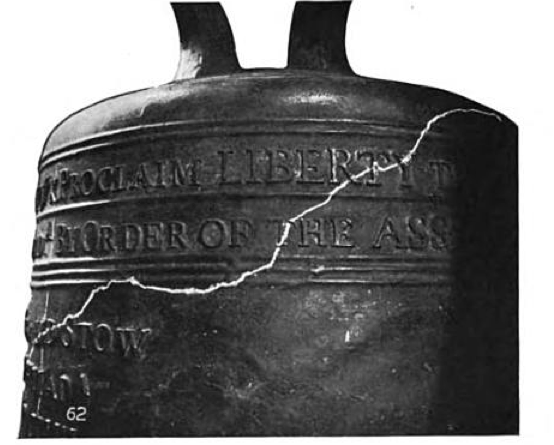
A 1915 photo of the Liberty Bell's hairline crack, which developed at some point in the 19th century, possibly in July 1835 as the bell rung following the death of U.S. Supreme Court Chief Justice John Marshall

In 1876, Philadelphia city officials discussed what role the bell should play in the nation's Centennial festivities. Some wanted to repair it so it could sound at the Centennial Exposition being held in Philadelphia, but the idea was not adopted. The bell's custodians concluded that it was unlikely that the metal could be made into a bell that would have a pleasant sound, and that the crack had become part of the bell's character. Instead, a replica weighing 13,000 pounds (5,900 kg), representing 1,000 pounds for each of the Thirteen Colonies, was cast. The metal used for what was dubbed "the Centennial Bell" included four melted-down cannons: one used by each side in the American Revolutionary War, and one used by each side in the American Civil War. The bell was rung at the Exposition grounds on July 4, 1876, and was later recast to improve the sound. The bell is currently attached to the clock in the steeple of Independence Hall. While the Liberty Bell was not displayed at the Centennial Exposition, a great many exposition visitors came to visit it. Its image was ubiquitous throughout the exposition grounds. Myriad souvenirs were sold bearing its image or shape, and state pavilions contained replicas of the bell made of substances ranging from stone to tobacco. In 1877, the bell was hung from the ceiling of the Assembly Room by a chain with thirteen links.

Between 1885 and 1915, the Liberty Bell was transported to seven expositions and celebrations. Each time, the bell traveled by railroad, and an extra number of rail stops were made along the way so that local people could view it. By 1885, the Liberty Bell was widely recognized as a symbol of freedom, and as a treasured relic of independence and freedom, and was growing increasingly famous as versions of George Lippard's legend were reprinted in history and school books. In early 1885, the city agreed to let it travel to New Orleans for the World Cotton Centennial exposition. Large crowds mobbed the bell at each stop. In Biloxi, Mississippi, the former President of the Confederate States of America, Jefferson Davis, visited the bell and delivered a speech paying homage to it and urging national unity. In 1893, it was sent to the World Columbian Exposition in Chicago, where it was the centerpiece of the state's exhibit in the Pennsylvania Building. On July 4, 1893, in Chicago, the bell was serenaded with the first performance of The Liberty Bell March, conducted by its composer John Philip Sousa.

Philadelphians began to cool to the idea of sending it to other cities when it returned from Chicago bearing a new crack, and each new proposed journey met with increasing opposition. It was also found that the bell's private watchman had been cutting off small pieces for souvenirs. Philadelphia placed the bell in a glass-fronted oak case.

In 1898, it was taken out of the glass case and hung from its yoke again in the tower hall of Independence Hall, a room that would remain its home until the end of 1975. A guard was posted by the bell to prevent souvenir hunters who might otherwise chip at it.

By 1909, the bell was sent on six trips. The bell's cracking worsened, and souvenir hunters had chipped off pieces of it, depriving it of over one percent of its weight. Its weight was reported as 2,080 lb (940 kg) in 1904.

=== 20th century ===
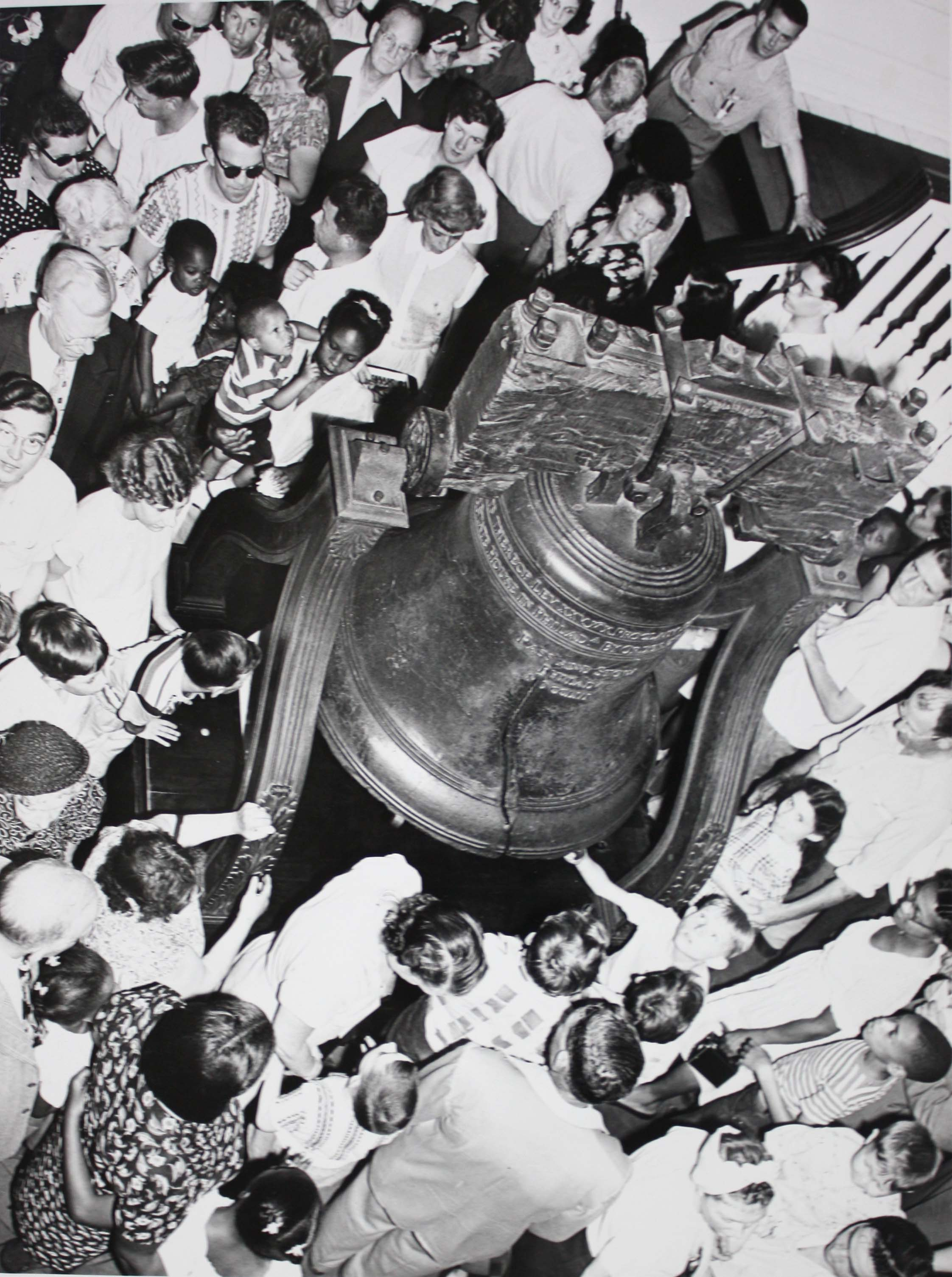
A crowd of tourists gathers around the Liberty Bell at Independence Hall in July 1951.

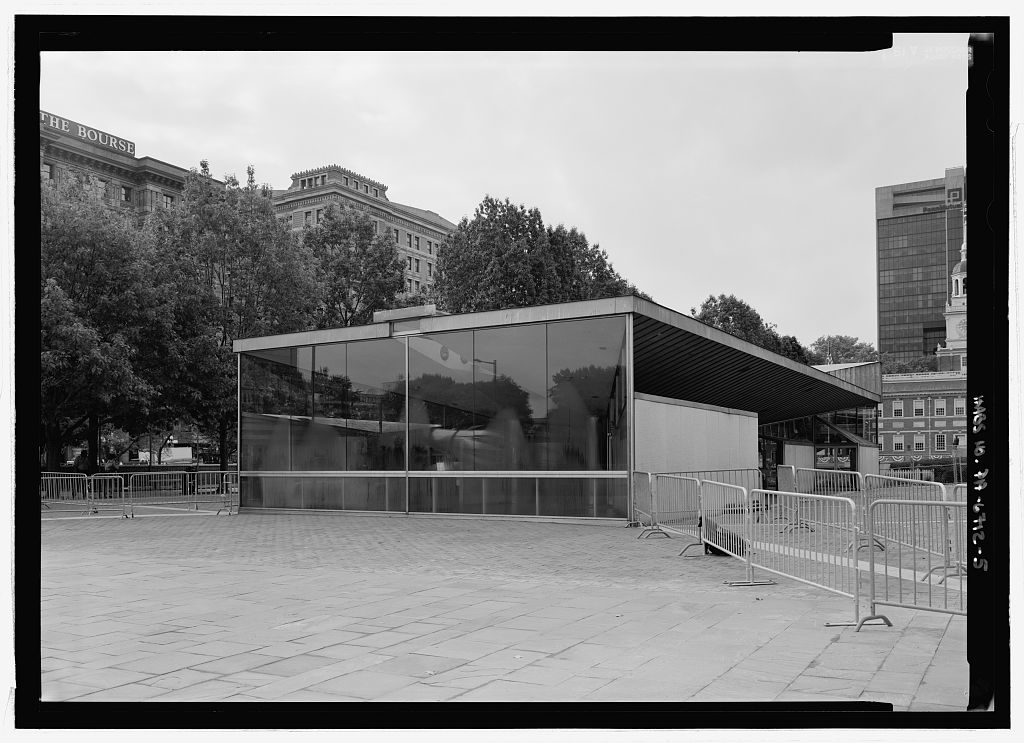
The Liberty Bell Pavilion in Philadelphia, the Liberty Bell's home from 1976 to 2003

In 1912, the organizers of the Panama–Pacific International Exposition requested the bell for the 1915 fair in San Francisco, but Philadelphia was reluctant to let it travel again. The city finally agreed to let it be transported to San Francisco since it had never been west of St. Louis, and it was a chance to allow millions of Americans to see it who might never again have the opportunity. In 1914, fearing that the cracks might lengthen during the long train ride to San Francisco, Philadelphia installed a metal support structure inside the bell, called the "spider".

In February 1915, the bell was tapped gently with wooden mallets to produce sounds that were transmitted to the fair as the signal to open it, a transmission that also inaugurated transcontinental telephone service. Some five million Americans saw the bell on its train journey west. It is estimated that nearly two million kissed it at the fair, with an uncounted number viewing it. The bell was taken on a different route on its way home during which another five million people viewed it.

In 1924, one of Independence Hall's exterior doors was replaced by glass, allowing some view of the bell even when the building was closed. When Congress enacted the nation's first peacetime draft in 1940, the first Philadelphians required to serve took their oaths of enlistment before the Liberty Bell. Once World War II began, the bell was again a symbol to sell war bonds.

Since the bell returned to Philadelphia, it has been moved out of doors only five times: three times for patriotic observances during and after World War I, and twice as the bell occupied new homes in 1976 and 2003. Chicago and San Francisco had obtained their visits after presenting petitions signed by hundreds of thousands of children. In 1933, Chicago tried again, with a petition signed by 3.4 million schoolchildren, for the 1933 Century of Progress Exhibition, and New York presented a petition to secure a visit from the bell for the 1939 New York World's Fair. Both efforts failed.

During World War II, it was feared that the bell might be in danger from saboteurs or enemy bombing, and city officials considered moving the bell to Fort Knox, to be stored with the nation's gold reserves. The idea provoked a storm of protest from around the nation, and was abandoned. Officials then considered building an underground steel vault above which it would be displayed, and into which it could be lowered if necessary. The project was dropped after studies concluded that the digging might undermine the foundations of Independence Hall. On December 17, 1944, the Whitechapel Bell Foundry offered to recast the bell at no cost as a gesture of Anglo-American friendship. The bell was again tapped on D-Day, V-E Day, and V-J Day.

After World War II, and following considerable controversy, the City of Philadelphia agreed to transfer custody of the bell and Independence Hall, while retaining ownership, to the federal government. The city would also transfer various colonial-era buildings it owned. Congress agreed to the transfer in 1948, and three years later Independence National Historical Park was founded, incorporating those properties and administered by the National Park Service (NPS or Park Service). The Park Service would be responsible for maintaining and displaying the bell. The NPS would also administer the three blocks just north of Independence Hall that had been condemned by the state, razed, and developed into a park called Independence Mall.

In the postwar period, the bell became a symbol of freedom used in the Cold War. The bell was chosen for the symbol of a savings bond campaign in 1950. The purpose of this campaign, as then Vice President Alben W. Barkley said, was to make the country "so strong that no one can impose ruthless, godless ideologies on us". In 1955, former residents of nations behind the Iron Curtain were allowed to tap the bell as a symbol of hope and encouragement to their compatriots. Foreign dignitaries, including Israeli Prime Minister David Ben-Gurion and West Berlin Mayor Ernst Reuter, have visited the Liberty Bell, and they commented that the bell symbolized the link between the United States and their nations. During the 1960s, the bell was the site of several protests, both for the civil rights movement and by various protesters supporting or opposing the Vietnam War.

Almost from the start of its stewardship, the Park Service sought to move the bell from Independence Hall to a structure where it would be easier to care for the bell and accommodate visitors. The first such proposal was withdrawn in 1958, after considerable public protest. The Park Service tried again as part of the planning for the 1976 United States Bicentennial. The Independence National Historical Park Advisory Committee proposed in 1969 that the bell be moved out of Independence Hall, as the building could not accommodate the millions expected to visit Philadelphia for the Bicentennial. In 1972, the Park Service announced plans to build a large glass tower for the bell at the new visitors center at S. Third and Chestnut streets, two blocks east of Independence Hall, at a cost of $5 million, but citizens again protested the move. Instead, in 1973, the Park Service proposed to build a smaller glass pavilion for the bell at the north end of Independence Mall, between Arch and Race streets. Philadelphia Mayor Frank Rizzo agreed with the pavilion idea, but proposed that the pavilion be built across Chestnut Street from Independence Hall, which the state feared would destroy the view of the historic building from the mall area. Rizzo's view prevailed, and the bell was moved to a glass-and-steel Liberty Bell Pavilion, about 200 yards (180 m) from its old home at Independence Hall, as the Bicentennial year began.

During the Bicentennial, members of the Procrastinators' Club of America jokingly picketed the Whitechapel Bell Foundry with signs "We got a lemon" and "What about the warranty?" The foundry told the protesters that it would be glad to replace the bell, so long as it was returned in the original packaging.

In 1958, the foundry, then trading under the name Mears and Stainbank Foundry, offered to recast the bell, but was told by the Park Service that neither it nor the public wanted the crack removed. The foundry was called upon, in 1976, to cast a six-times oversize (weighing 12,000 pounds) replica of the Liberty Bell known as the Bicentennial Bell that was presented to the United States by the British monarch, Queen Elizabeth II, and was housed in the tower once intended for the Liberty Bell, at the former visitor center on South Third Street.

==== Liberty Bell Center ====
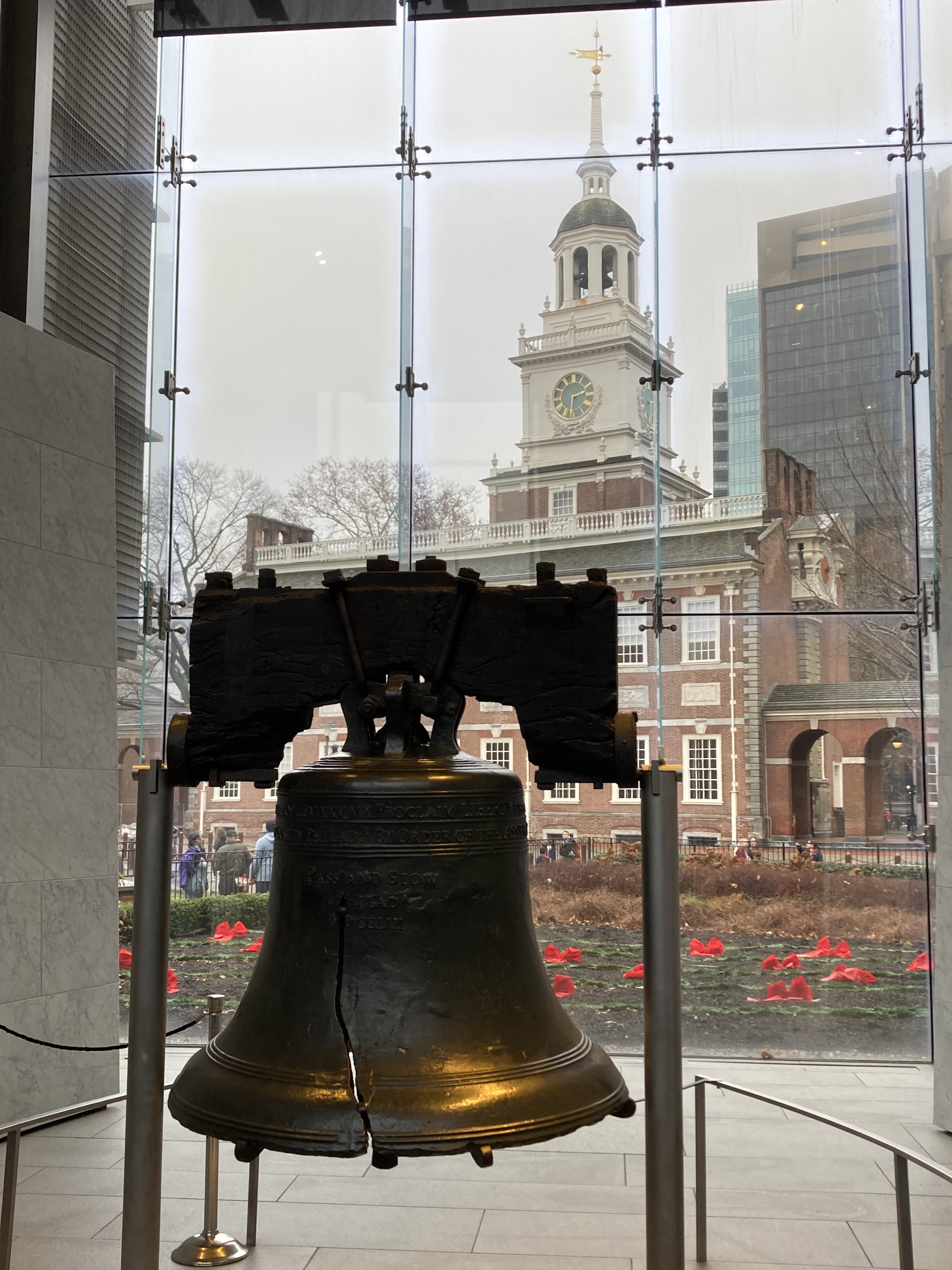
The interior of the Liberty Bell chamber at the Liberty Bell Center with Independence Hall and the Centennial Bell visible in its steeple in the background

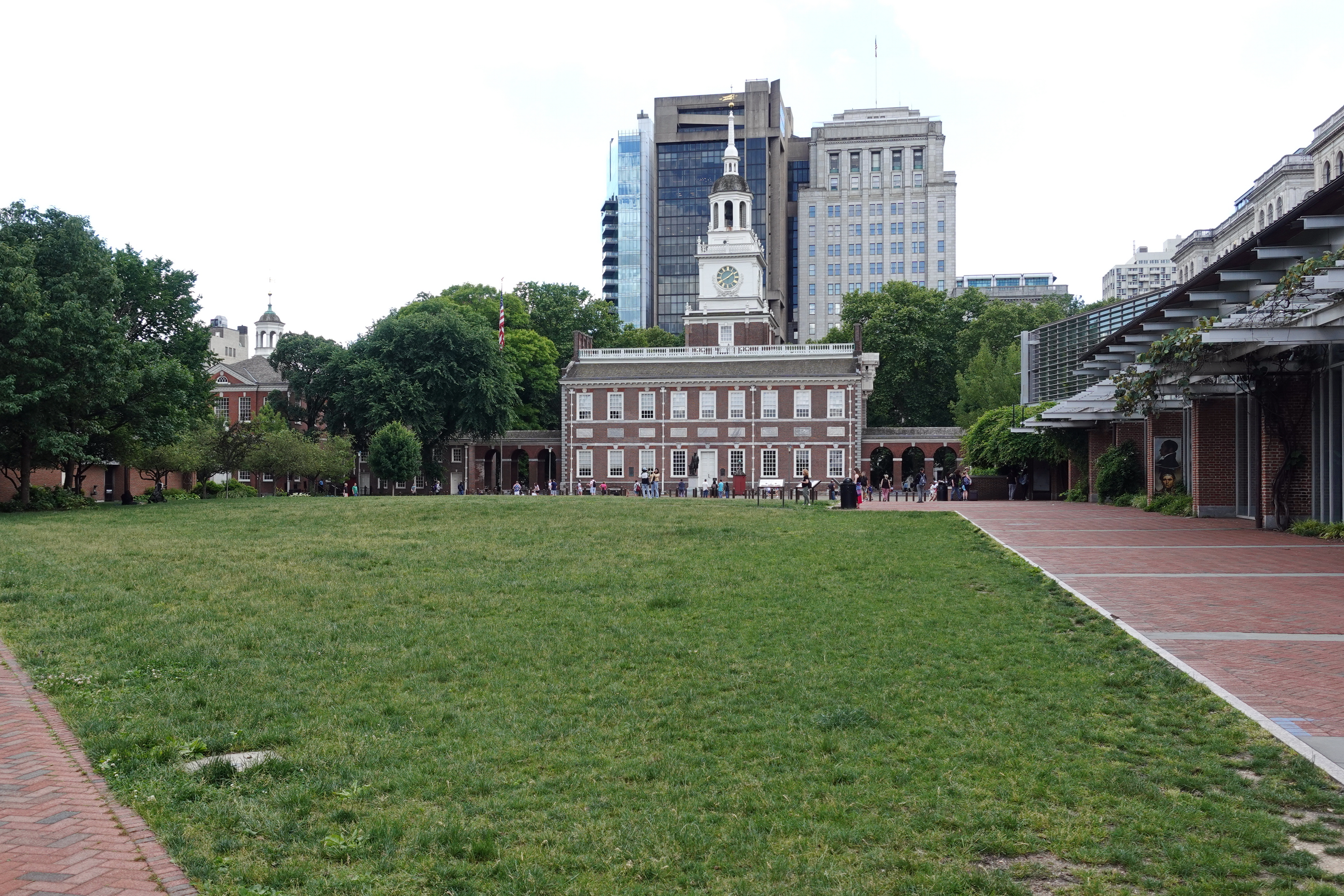
Independence Hall with the Liberty Bell Center (on right)

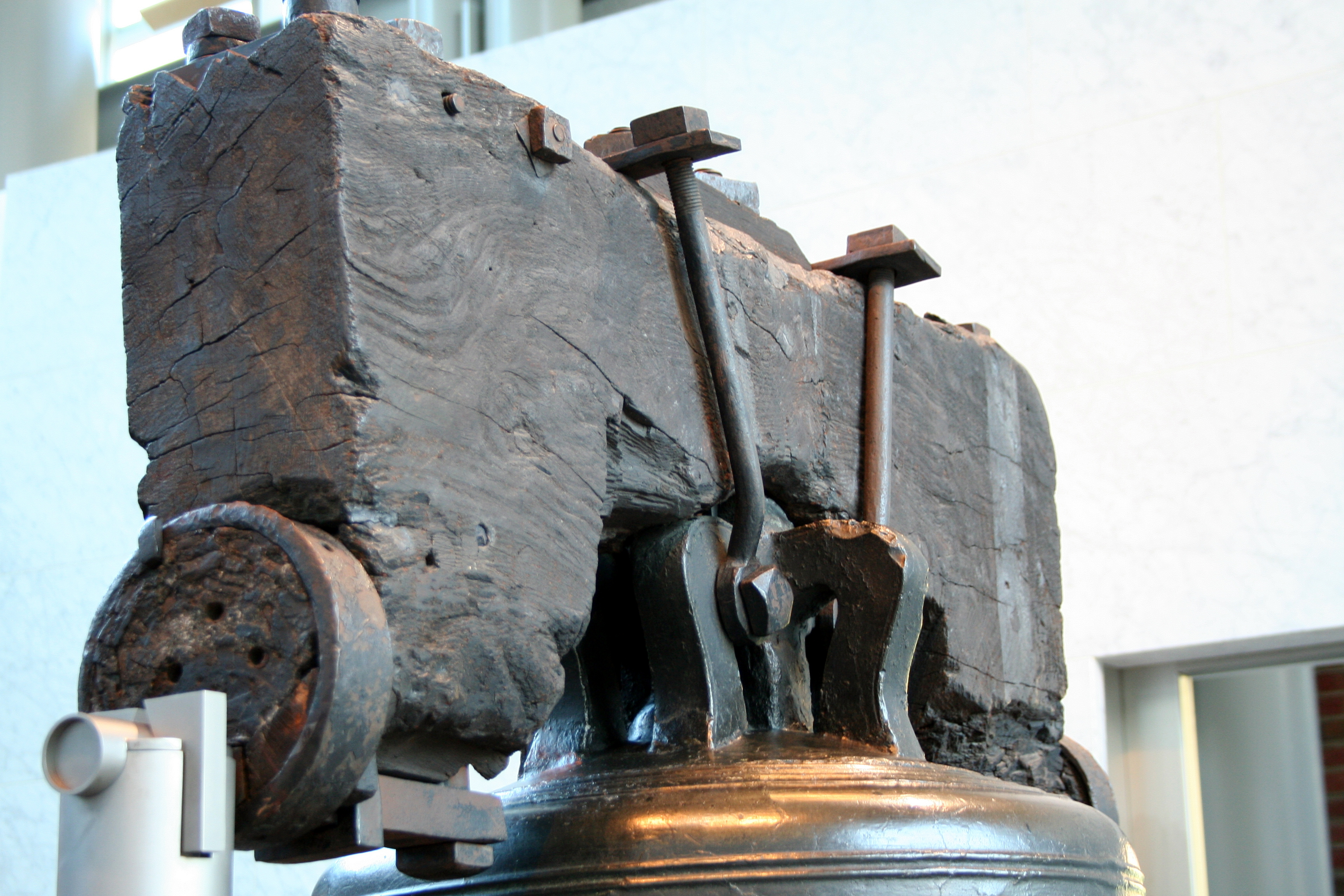
A view of the Liberty Bell's mount in October 2009

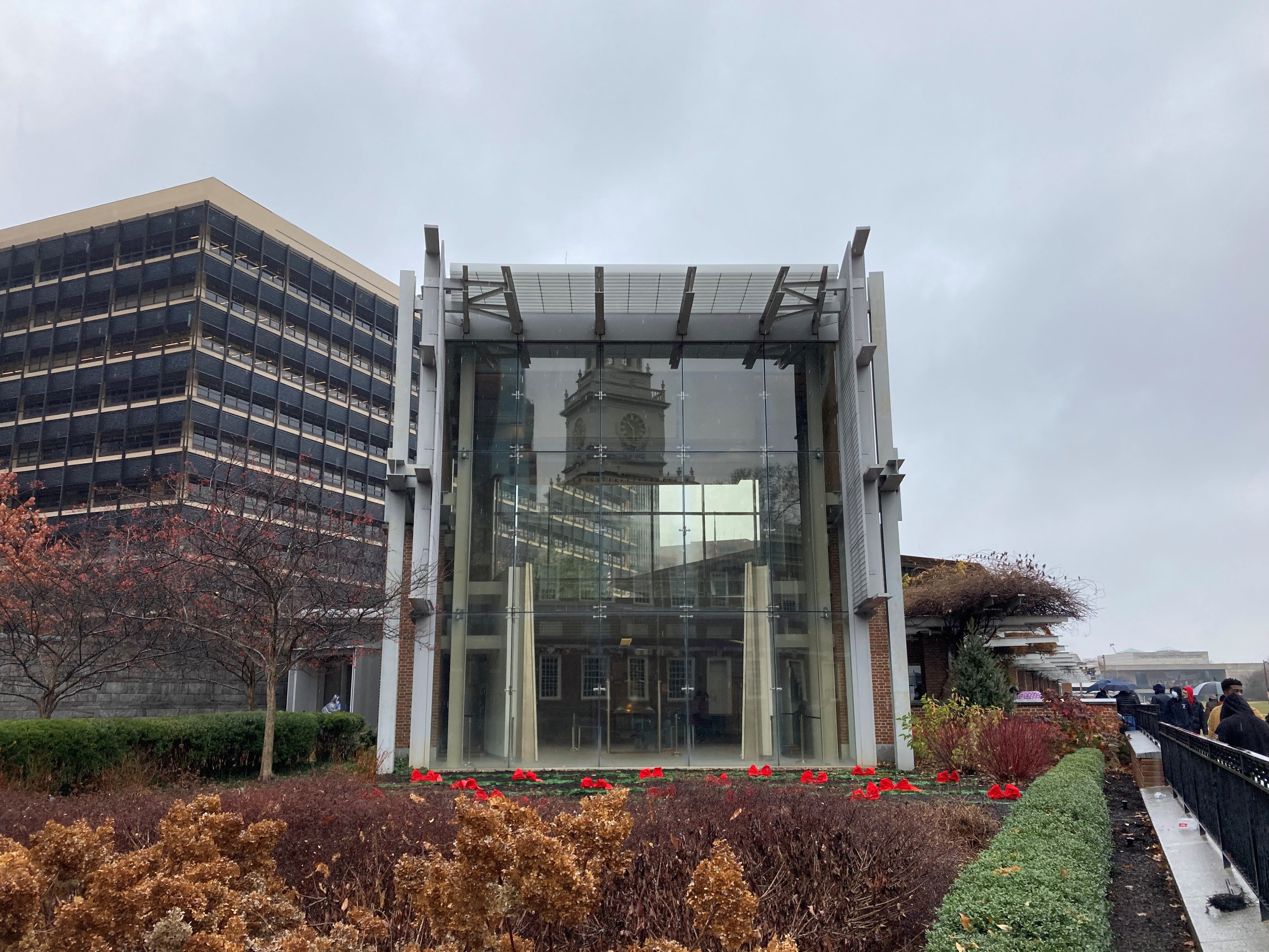
The south end of Liberty Bell Center with both the Liberty Bell and a reflection of Independence Hall in January 2022

In 1995, the Park Service began preliminary work on a redesign of Independence Mall. Architects Venturi, Scott Brown & Associates developed a master plan with two design alternatives. The first proposed a block-long visitors center on the south side of Market Street, which would also house the Liberty Bell. This would have interrupted the mall's three-block vista of Independence Hall, and made the bell visible only from the south, on Chestnut Street. The second alternative placed a similar visitors center on the north side of Market Street, also interrupting the mall's vista, with the bell in a small pavilion on the south side. City planner Edmund Bacon, who oversaw the mall's design in the 1950s, saw preservation of the vista of Independence Hall as essential. He created his own plan that included a domed bell pavilion built north of Market Street. Public reaction to the possibility of moving the Liberty Bell so far from Independence Hall was strongly negative. NPS announced that the bell would remain on the block between Chestnut and Market streets. Other plans were proposed; each had strengths and weaknesses, but the goal of all was to encourage visitors to see more of the historical park than just the Liberty Bell.

The Olin Partnership was hired to create a new master plan for Independence Mall; its team included architect Bernard Cywinski, who ultimately won a limited design competition to design what was called the Liberty Bell Center (LBC). Cywinski's design was unveiled in early 1999. Significantly larger than the existing pavilion, allowing for exhibit space and an interpretive center, the proposed LBC building also would cover about 15% of the footprint of the long-demolished President's House, the residence used by George Washington and John Adams before the White House was completed in 1800. Archaeologists excavating the LBC's intended site uncovered remnants of the 1790–1800 executive mansion that were reburied. The project became highly controversial when it was revealed that George Washington's slaves had been housed only feet from the planned Liberty Bell Center's main entrance. The Park Service refused to redesign the LBC building, or delay its construction. NPS initially resisted interpreting the slaves and the slave quarters, but after years of protest by Black activists, agreed.

=== 21st century ===
The new facility that opened hours after the bell was installed on October 9, 2003, is adjacent to an outline of Washington's slave quarters marked in the pavement, with interpretive panels explaining the significance of what was found. The GPS address is 526 Market Street.

Inside the Liberty Bell Center, visitors pass through a number of exhibits about the bell before reaching the Liberty Bell itself. Due to security concerns following an attack on the bell by a visitor with a hammer in 2001, the bell is hung out of easy reach of visitors, who are no longer allowed to touch it, and all visitors undergo a security screening.

The Liberty Bell now weighs 2,080 pounds (940 kg). Its metal is 70% copper and 25% tin, with the remainder consisting of lead, zinc, arsenic, gold, and silver. It hangs from what is believed to be its original yoke, made from American elm. Although the crack in the bell appears to end at the abbreviation "Philad^{a}" in the last line of the inscription, that is merely the widened crack, filed out during the 19th century to allow the bell to ring. A hairline crack, extending through to the inside of the bell, continues towards the right and gradually moves to the top of the bell, through the word "and" in "Pass and Stow", then through the word "the" before the word "Assembly", and finally through the letters "rty" in the word "Liberty". The crack ends near the attachment with the yoke.

Professor Constance M. Greiff, in her book tracing the history of Independence National Historical Park, wrote of the Liberty Bell:

[T]he Liberty Bell is the most venerated object in the park, a national icon. It is not as beautiful as some other things that were in Independence Hall in those momentous days two hundred years ago, and it is irreparably damaged. Perhaps that is part of its almost mystical appeal. Like our democracy it is fragile and imperfect, but it has weathered threats, and it has endured.

== Legacy and commemorations ==
In addition to the replicas that are seen at Independence National Historical Park, early replicas of the Liberty Bell include the so-called Justice Bell or Women's Liberty Bell, commissioned in 1915 by suffragists to advocate for women's suffrage. This bell had the same legend as the Liberty Bell, with two added words, "establish justice", words taken from the Preamble to the Constitution of the United States. It also had the clapper chained to the bell so it could not sound, symbolizing the inability of women, lacking the vote, to influence political events. The Justice Bell toured extensively to publicize the cause. After the passage of the Nineteenth Amendment (granting women the vote), the Justice Bell was brought to the front of Independence Hall on August 26, 1920, to finally sound. It remained on a platform before Independence Hall for several months before city officials required that it be taken away, and today is at the Washington Memorial Chapel at Valley Forge.

As part of the Liberty Bell Savings Bonds drive in 1950, 55 replicas of the Liberty Bell, including one each for the 48 states, one for the national capital of Washington, D.C., and one each for U.S. territories, were ordered by the U.S. Department of the Treasury and were cast in France by the Fonderie Paccard. The bells were to be displayed and rung on patriotic occasions. Today, many of the bells are sited near state capitol buildings. Although Wisconsin's bell is now at its state capitol, initially it was sited on the grounds of the state's Girls Detention Center. Texas's bell is located inside the Academic Building on the campus of Texas A&M University in College Station. The Texas bell was presented to the university in appreciation of the service of the school's graduates.

In 1950, too, an enlarged and slightly modified replica of the Liberty Bell, baptized Freedom Bell, was cast in England, brought to the United States, and toured the country as part of a "Crusade of Freedom". It was then shipped to Germany and installed in the tower of West Berlin's city hall. When Robert F. Kennedy visited the city in 1962, followed by his brother John F. Kennedy in June 1963, both drew a parallel between the Liberty Bell and the new Freedom Bell.

The Liberty Bell appeared on a commemorative coin in 1926 to mark the sesquicentennial of American independence. Its first use on a circulating coin was on the reverse side of the Franklin half dollar, struck between 1948 and 1963. It also appeared on the Bicentennial design of the Eisenhower dollar, superimposed against the moon.

On the 150th anniversary of the Declaration of Independence in 1926, the U.S. Post Office issued a commemorative stamp depicting the Liberty Bell for the Sesquicentennial Exposition in Philadelphia in 1926, though this stamp actually depicts the replica bell erected at the entrance to the exposition grounds. The Liberty Bell was chosen for the stamp design theme because the symbol was most representative of the nation's independence. Since then the Liberty Bell has appeared on several other U.S. postage stamps, including the first forever stamp, issued since 2007. For the United States Semiquincentennial in 2026, the U.S. Mint issued 2,026 Liberty Bell-shaped $125 gold coins, the only non-round coins in recent American history.

An image of the Liberty Bell appears on the current $100 note. The image changes color, depending on the angle at which it is held.

The name "Liberty Bell" or "Liberty Belle" is commonly used for commercial purposes, and has denoted brands and business names ranging from a life insurance company to a Montana escort service. Walt Disney World has a replica of the Liberty Bell that is in Liberty Square in the Magic Kingdom. The replica was cast from the mold of the actual Liberty Bell in 1989. A large outline of the bell hangs over the right-field bleachers at Citizens Bank Park, home of the Philadelphia Phillies baseball team; it is illuminated and swings back and forth, and a bell sound is played whenever one of their players hits a home run or if the Phillies win that game. This bell outline replaced one at the Phillies' former home, Veterans Stadium.

On April 1, 1996, Taco Bell announced via ads and press releases that it had purchased the Liberty Bell and changed its name to the Taco Liberty Bell. The bell, the ads related, would henceforth spend half the year at Taco Bell corporate headquarters in Irvine, California. Outraged calls flooded Independence National Historical Park, and Park Service officials hastily called a press conference to deny that the bell had been sold. After several hours, Taco Bell admitted that it was an April Fools' Day joke. Despite the protests, company sales of tacos, enchiladas, and burritos rose by more than half a million dollars that week.

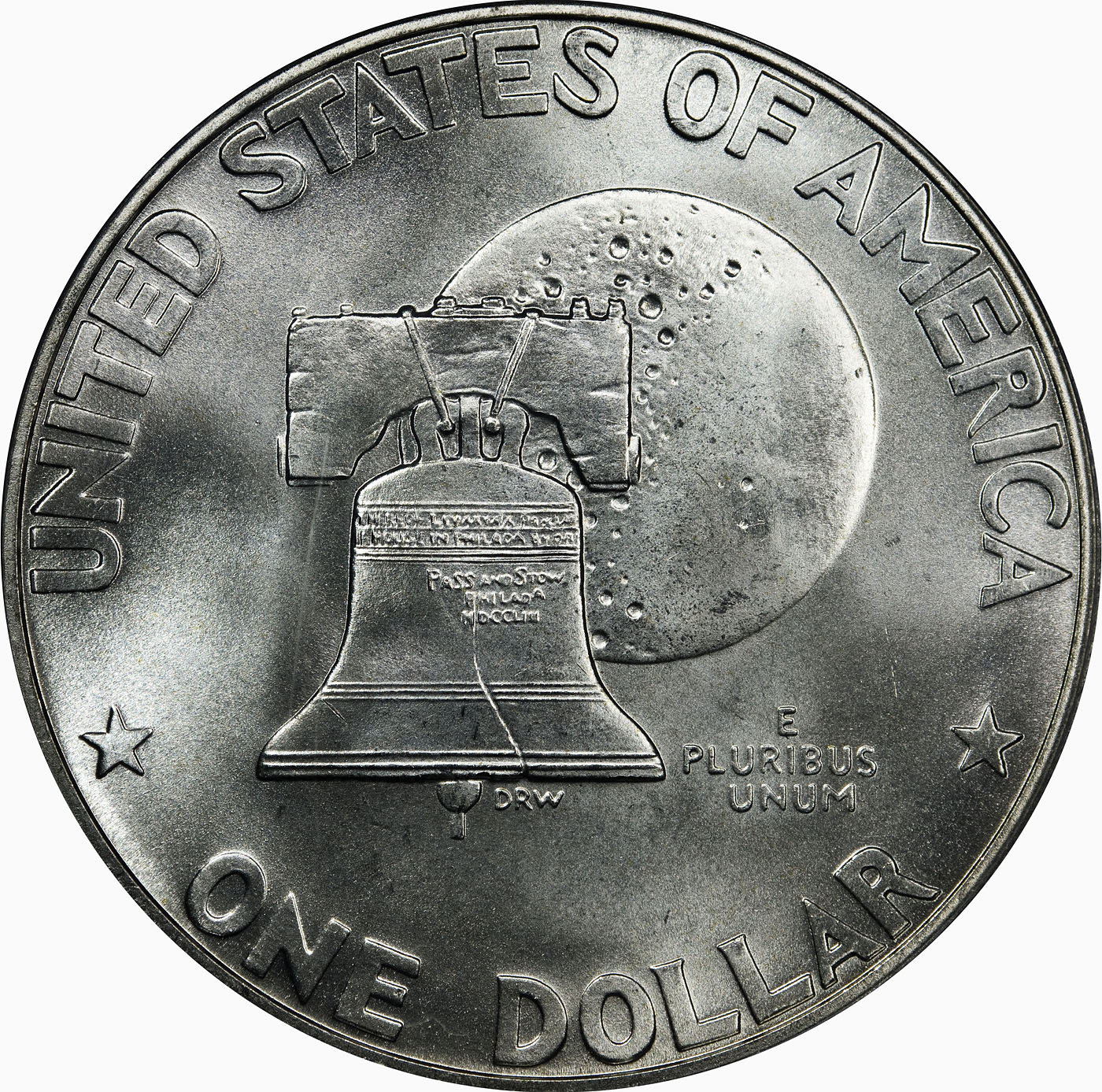
Bicentennial dollar, 1976 issue, reverse

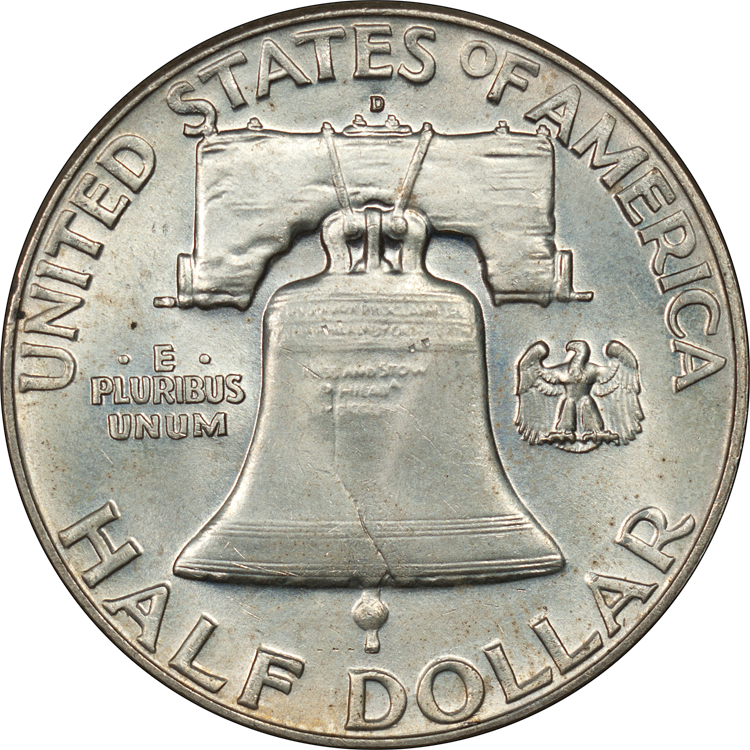
Franklin half dollar, reverse

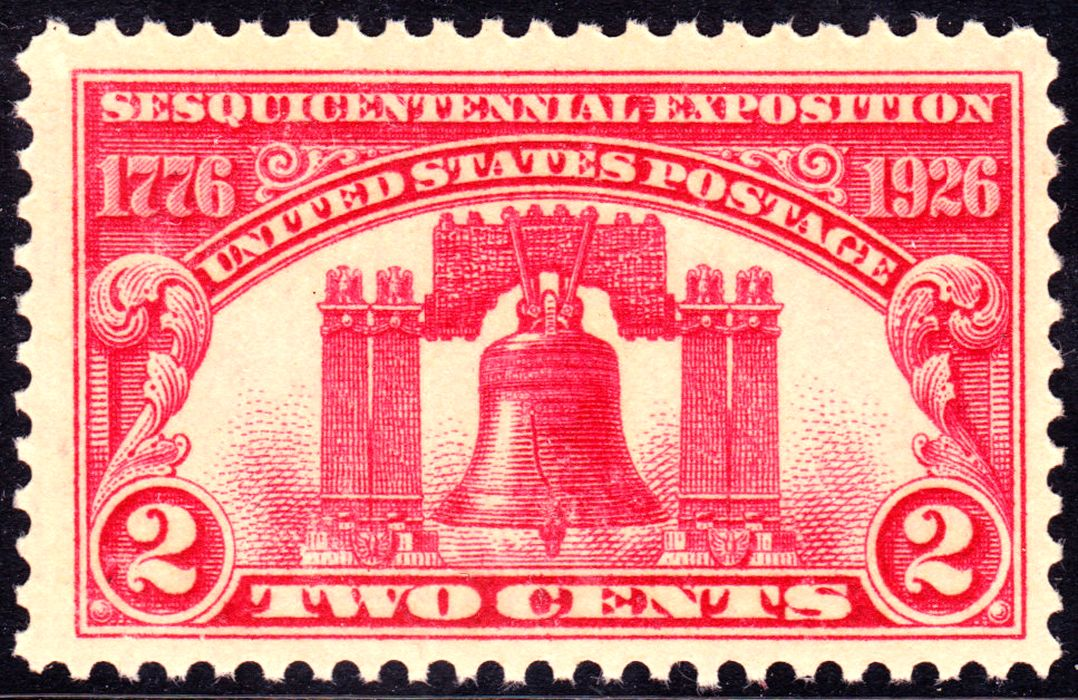
Liberty Bell stamp, issue of 1926 See other versions issued in 1960, 1961, 1975

== See also ==
- Liberty Bell Memorial Museum, located in Melbourne, Florida
- Liberty Bell Ruby, a massive ruby sculpted into the shape of the Liberty Bell
- Liberty Belle was a frequently-used name for United States Army Air Forces (USAAF) aircraft during World War II, including over two dozen known Boeing B-17 Flying Fortresses and Consolidated B-24 Liberators, with the bell often being depicted in the planes' nose art.
- The Mercury spacecraft that astronaut Gus Grissom flew on July 21, 1961, was dubbed Liberty Bell 7. Mercury capsules were somewhat bell-shaped, and this one received a painted crack to mimic the original bell. Liberty Bell 7 became the only Mercury capsule to suffer an integrity failure.
- Margaret Buechner composed a work for chorus and orchestra, Liberty Bell, that incorporates a 1959 recording of the actual bell made by Columbia Records.
- Freedom Bell in Berlin, Germany – given as a gift from Americans to the city of Berlin in 1950 as a symbol of the fight for freedom and against communism in Europe
- The Bell at Saint Paul's Church National Historic Site in Mount Vernon, New York – cast at the same foundry as the Liberty Bell, but smaller and easier to handle, it was periodically shown around the country in the 19th century as a surrogate for the Philadelphia bell; during both World War I and World War II, it was again taken around the country and rung at War Bond rallies as a symbol of unity and liberty.
- The Freedom Bell, American Legion, a two times replica resides in front of Washington Union Station in Washington, D.C., and toured the United States aboard the 1975–76 Bicentennial American Freedom Train.
- The Rhodesian Independence Bell, a replica of the Liberty Bell funded by American donors to commemorate Rhodesian independence
- The Tsar Bell, an early 18th-century Russian bell famous for its massive size and its damaged state
