= Bühne =

Bühne is the name for the following German places:

- Bühne (Osterwieck), a part of the town Osterwieck, Saxony-Anhalt, Germany
- Bühne (Borgentreich), a part of the town Borgentreich, North Rhine-Westphalia, Germany

== See also ==
- Buehner, a surname
