= Liberty Bell Pavilion =

Coordinates: 39.9502°N 75.1497°W

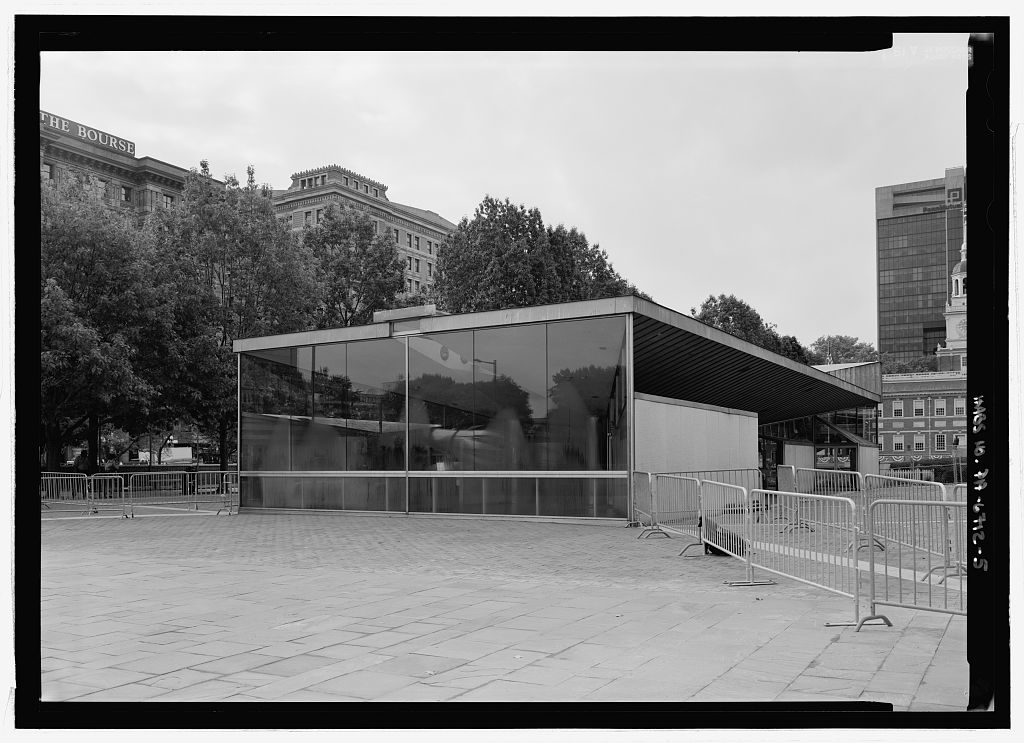
- Market Street facade.
- Interactive map of the Liberty Bell Pavilion area

General information
- Status: Demolished
- Architectural style: Modernist
- Location: 526 Market Street
- Groundbreaking: Early 1975
- Completed: 1975
- Opened: January 1, 1976
- Demolished: March 2006

Height
- Height: 36 feet (11 m)

Technical details
- Material: Steel-and-glass

Design and construction
- Architect: Romaldo Giurgola
- Architecture firm: Giurgola Associates

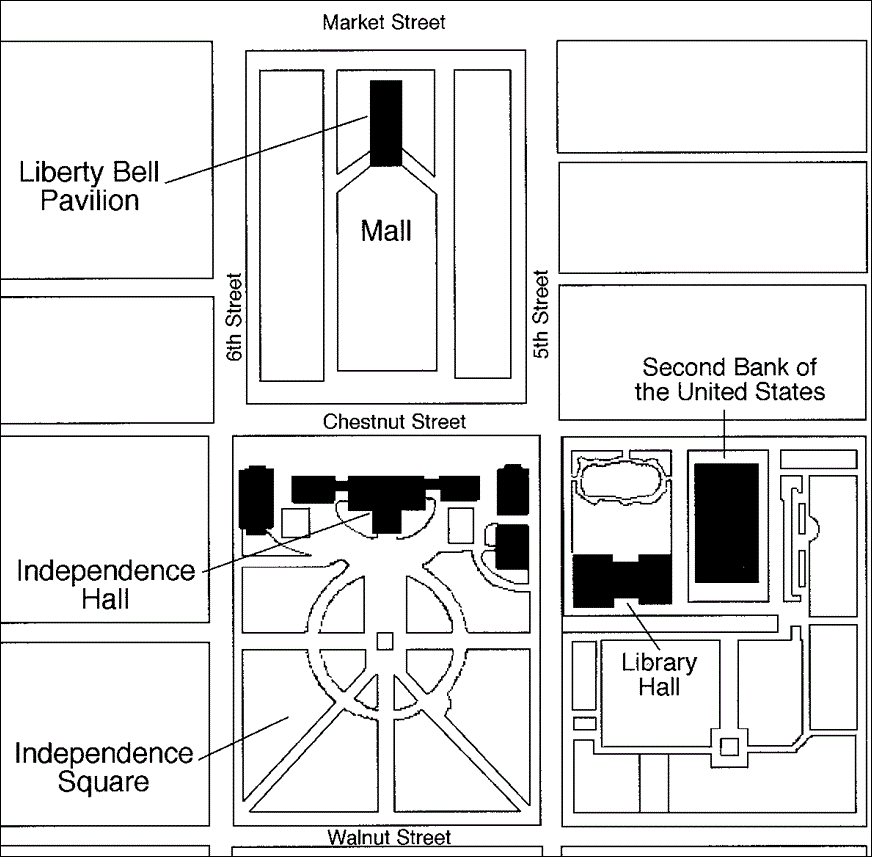
National Park Service map.

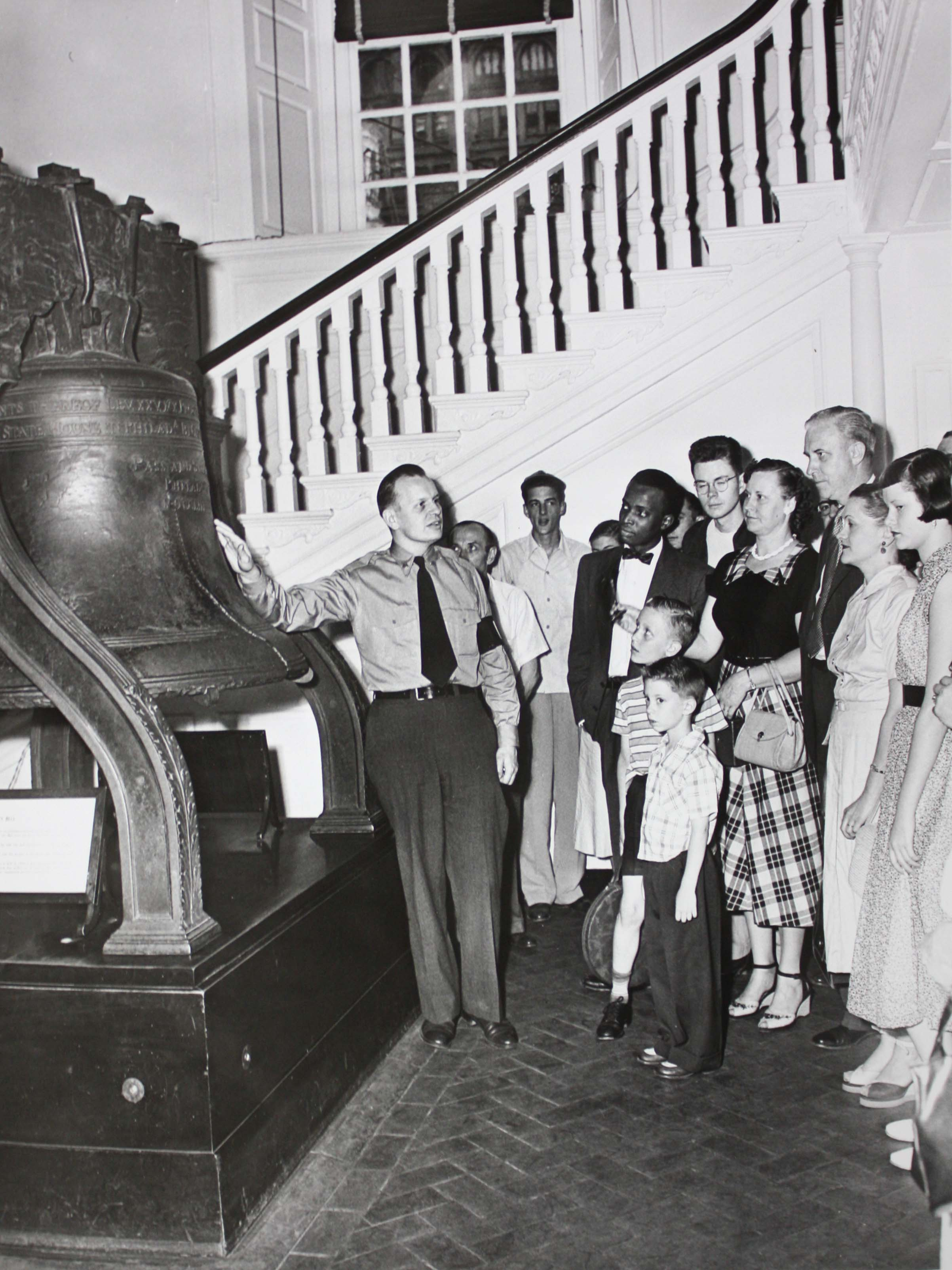
The Liberty Bell on display in Independence Hall, 1951

The Liberty Bell Pavilion (demolished) was a building within Independence National Historical Park (INHP) in Philadelphia, Pennsylvania, that housed the Liberty Bell from January 1, 1976 to October 9, 2003. Designed by the architectural firm Giurgola Associates to be the Bell's permanent home, it stood for only 30 years. The Bell is currently housed in a much larger building, the Liberty Bell Center, completed in 2003. The Pavilion was demolished in 2006.

== Moving the Bell ==
The Liberty Bell, cast in 1752 and bearing the words "Proclaim LIBERTY Throughout all the Land unto all the Inhabitants Thereof", was commissioned by the Pennsylvania Provincial Assembly to be the bell for the Pennsylvania Statehouse, now called Independence Hall. Later, this was the building in which the Declaration of Independence (1776) and United States Constitution (1787) were debated and signed.

The Bell originally hung in the lowest chamber of the building's wooden spire, but it was lowered into the brick tower when the rotting spire was deemed unsafe and removed. In 1852, the cracked Bell was taken down and exhibited on the Hall's ground floor.

In 1969, Independence National Historical Park expressed concern that crowds of visitors to the upcoming 1976 United States Bicentennial could overwhelm (and possibly cause structural damage to) Independence Hall. INHP's proposed solution was to separate the Bell from the Hall, creating two visitor attractions. INHP's plan, announced in 1972, involved moving the Bell to a visitor center to be built at 3rd & Chestnut Streets (2-1/2 blocks east of Independence Hall). The Bell was to be installed on the visitor center's second story – separated, literally and visually, from the building for which it had been created and in which it had been housed for 220 years. Following severe criticism from the public and members of Congress, this plan was abandoned.

INHP's next plan was to build a Bell pavilion at the north end of Independence Mall, on the block bounded by Race, Arch, 5th and 6th Streets (now the site of the National Constitution Center). This would have placed the Bell about a quarter-mile from Independence Hall. INHP's second plan was also soundly rejected.

Philadelphia's mayor, Frank Rizzo, pressed for the pavilion to be built on the block directly north of Independence Hall, bounded by Market, Chestnut, 5th and 6th Streets. The designer chosen was Romaldo Giurgola, a Philadelphia architect known for his Modernist buildings. Giurgola began design work in early 1974; ground was broken in early-1975 and construction was completed by the end of the year.

The move of the Bell some 600 feet north to its new home became part of Philadelphia's 1975 New Year's Eve celebration. The Pavilion opened to visitors at 12:01 am on January 1, 1976.

== Building ==
The steel-and-glass, hourglass-shaped building gathered visitors in a vestibule, and funnelled them down a hallway to the Bell Chamber. There, visitors encountered the Bell before a wall of glass, with Independence Hall as its backdrop. An INHP ranger or guide made a 5- to 10-minute presentation about its history. A longitudinal line of skylights illuminated the interior, relieving the visual weight of the ceiling and reinforcing the central axis of Independence Mall. Glass walls on the north and south facades and canted ones on the sides made the Bell visible from multiple angles, especially at night when it was lit by spotlights. Even when the Pavilion was closed, the Bell was visually accessible to everyone.

The building drew near-unanimous praise from architects, but some members of the public found the architecture cold and insufficiently-dignified, complaining that it looked like "a drive-in bank or subway station." The modest-sized Pavilion, with a capacity of about 100 people, also did not function well with large crowds. Even with the ranger presentations eliminated, lines of visitors were long on peak-visitation days and the wait could be hours.

When INHP began a redesign of Independence Hall in the 1990s, a much bigger Liberty Bell building was part of the plan. The Liberty Bell Center, built to the west of the Pavilion, opened on October 9, 2003. Initially, the vacant Pavilion was repurposed as a security building in which visitors headed to Independence Hall and the Liberty Bell Center were screened. Attempts were made by INHP to sell the Pavilion for the $800,000 cost of its disassembly and removal, but no buyer was found. Instead, some of the building materials were salvaged, and the rest of the Pavilion was demolished in 2006.

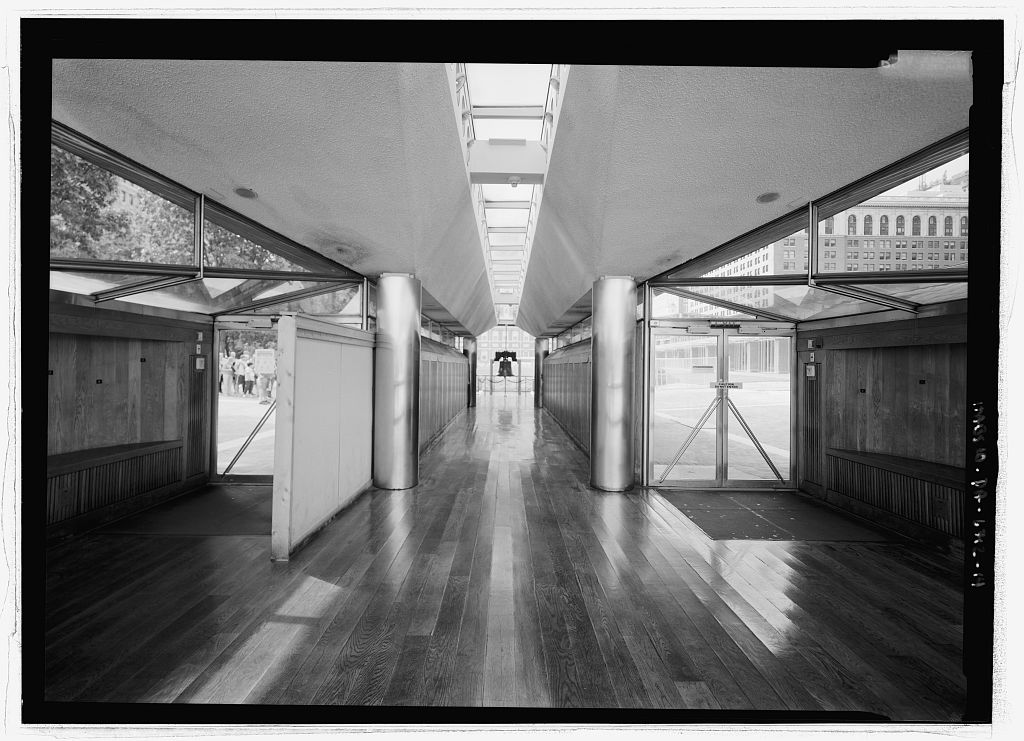
Vestibule, looking south.

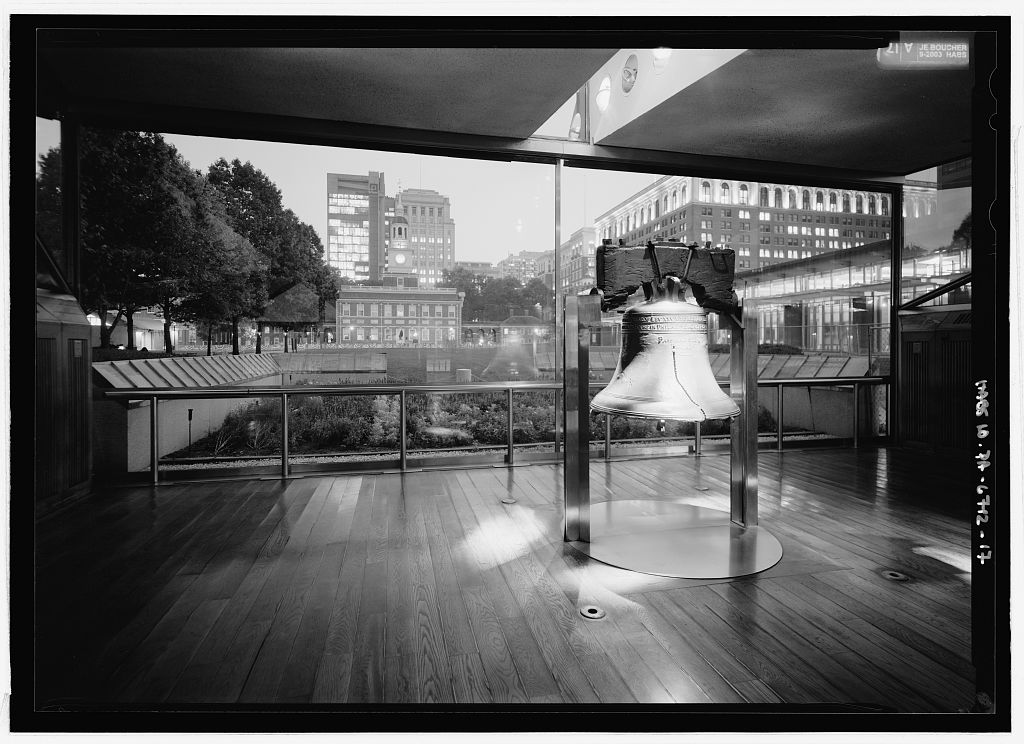
Bell Chamber.

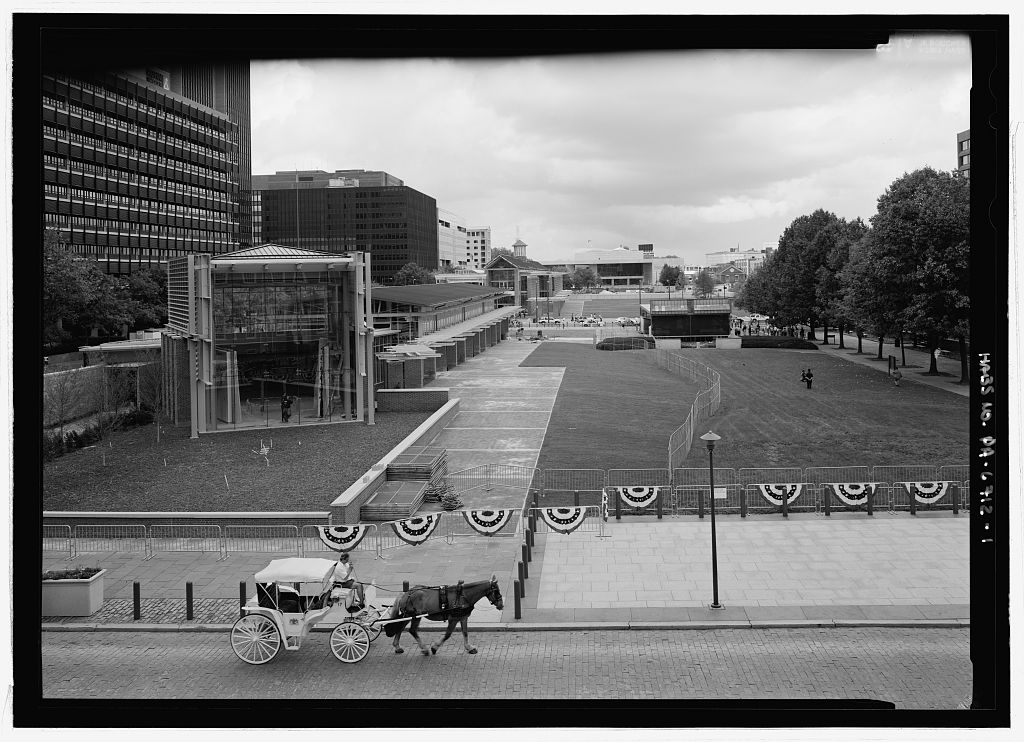
Not-yet-opened Liberty Bell Center (left) and Pavilion (right of center), looking north from Independence Hall. Summer 2003.
