= Orvosi Hetilap =

Hungarian academic medical journal

- Discipline: Medicine
- Language: Hungarian
- Edited by: Zoltán Papp

Publication details
- History: 1857–present
- Publisher: Akadémiai Kiadó (Hungary)
- Frequency: Weekly
- Impact factor: 0.8 (2023)

Standard abbreviations
- ISO 4: Orv. Hetil.

Indexing
- CODEN: ORHEAG
- ISSN: 0030-6002 (print); 1788-6120 (web)
- OCLC no.: 183307148

Links
- Journal homepage; Online access

Orvosi Hetilap (Hungarian pronunciation: [ˈorvoʃi ˈhɛtilɒp], English: Medical Weekly) is the weekly peer-reviewed medical journal of the Lajos Markusovszky Foundation, published by Akadémiai Kiadó.

== History ==
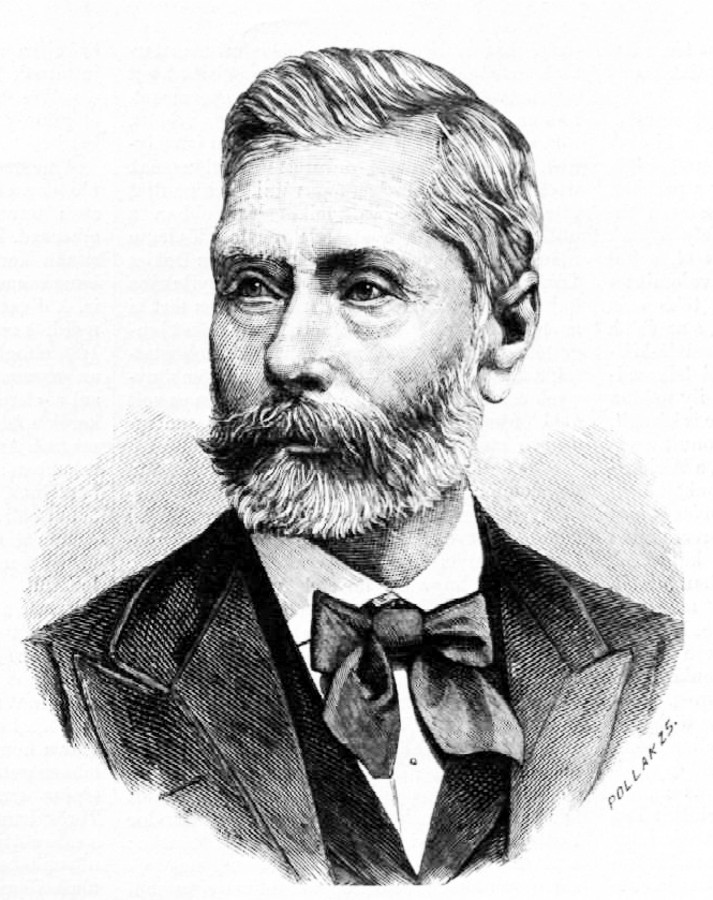
Lajos Markusovszky

Orvosi Hetlap is the oldest medical journal in Hungary and the oldest presently published Hungarian journal in general that was established in 1857 by Lajos Markusovszky. However, it was only the second medical journal in Hungary: the first was Orvosi Tár (English: Medical Cabinet), established in 1831 by Pál Bugát, which stopped publication by the end of the Hungarian Revolution of 1848.

The journal issues the Markusovszky Award.
