= Buehner =

Buehner is a surname. Notable people with the surname include:

- Carl W. Buehner (1898–1974), German-born American LDS general authority
- Mark Buehner (born 1959), American illustrator

== See also ==
- Buchner
- Philip Buehner House
