= Wolfgang Büchner (journalist) =

German journalist (born 1966)

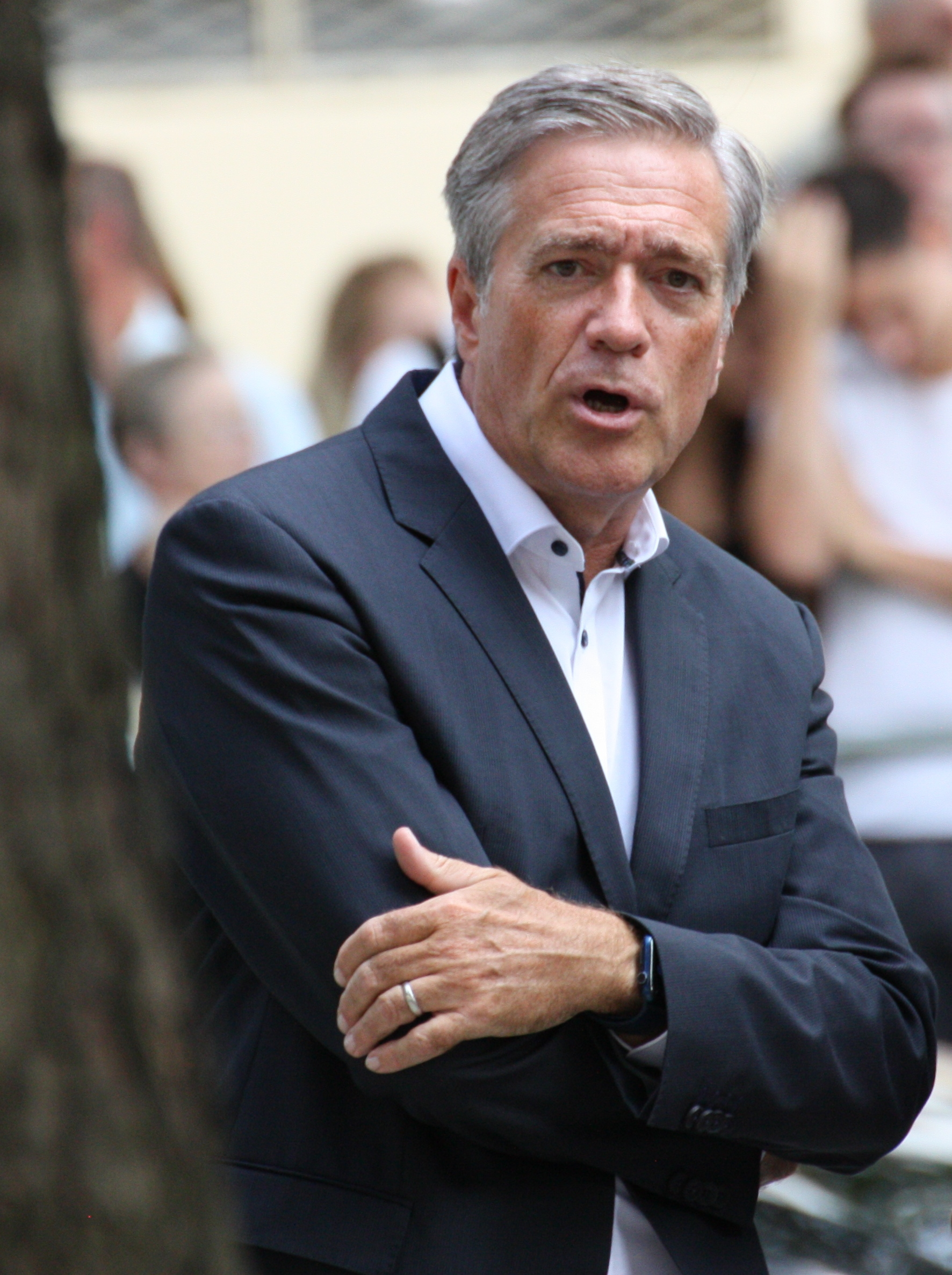
- Born: 23 July 1966 (age 60)
- Writing career
- Genre: journalism

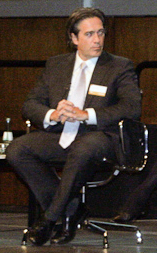
Wolfgang Büchner (2012)

Wolfgang Büchner (born 23 July 1966 in Speyer) is a German journalist.

== Life ==
He worked for Deutsche Presse-Agentur (dpa). From September 2013 to December 2014 Büchner was editor-in-chief for German magazine Der Spiegel. Since 1 July 2015 he works for Swiss newspaper Blick. He is member of organisation Reporters Without Borders.

From 2021 to 2025 he served as the Deputy Spokesperson of the German Government under chancellor Scholz.

== Awards ==
2014: Special award by European Press Prize (together with British journalist Alan Rusbridger)
