= Lajos Markusovszky =

Hungarian surgeon (1815–1893)

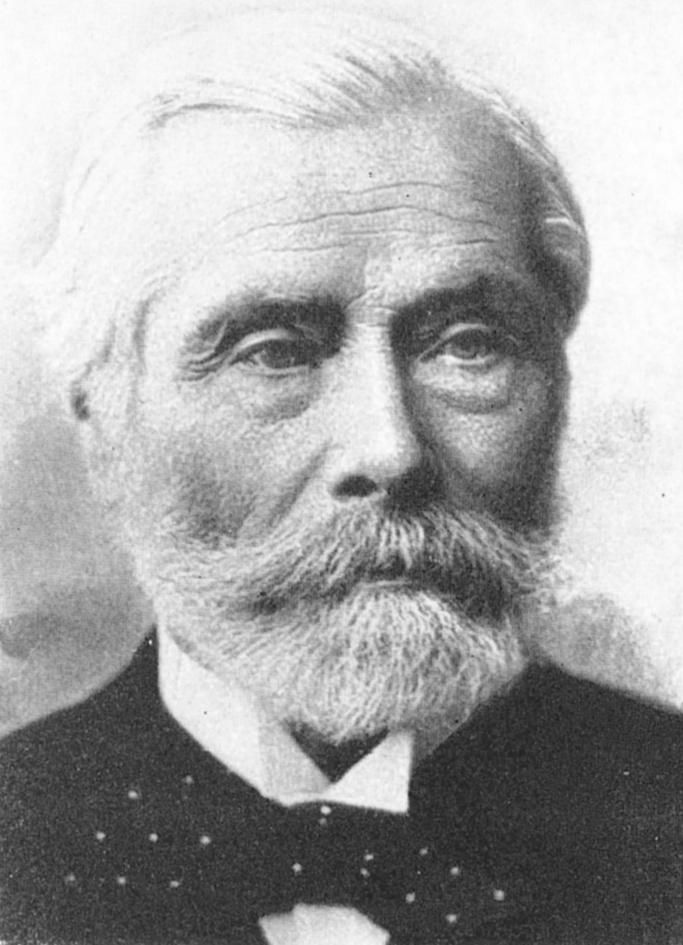
- Lajos Markusovszky
- Born: 1815; Csorba, Hungary
- Died: 1893 (aged 77–78); Opatija
- Known for: founder of Orvosi Hetilap
- Scientific career
- Fields: surgeon
- Doctoral advisor: János Balassa; Ignác Semmelweis

Lajos Markusovszky (1815–1893) surgeon, from 1857 founder and publisher of Orvosi Hetilap (Hungarian medical journal), later editor of the journal, after 1867 Advisor to the Ministry for Religion and Education regarding University affairs.

He is generally agreed to have been Ignaz Semmelweis's best friend.
