= Johann Andreas Buchner =

German pharmacologist

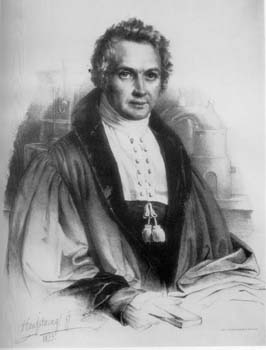
Johann Andreas Buchner (1783-1852)

Johann Andreas Buchner (6 April 1783 – 5 June 1852) was a German pharmacologist working in the area of alkaloids. He was the father of pharmacologist Ludwig Andreas Buchner (1813–1897).

He was born in Munich and studied at Johann Bartholomäus Trommsdorff's pharmaceutical institute at the University of Erfurt, obtaining his PhD in 1807. In 1809, he became Oberapotheker of the Zentral-Stiftungs-Apotheke for hospitals in Munich. In 1818, he was appointed an associate professor of pharmacy, medical formula instruction and toxicology at the Ludwig-Maximilians-Universität in Landshut, where he later became a full professor of pharmacy (1822). When the Ludwig-Maximilians-Universität located to Munich, he moved back to his hometown, where he lived and worked until his death.

He is credited with isolating salicin from willow bark (1828) and the discovery of berberine (from the root bark of Berberis vulgaris).

== Works ==
- Vollständiger Inbegriff der Pharmacie in ihren Grundlehren und praktischen Theilen: ein Handbuch für Aerzte und Apotheker. Bände: 2 / Bd.1 T.3 / Bd.2 T.4 / Bd.3 T.4 / 7. Schrag, Nuremberg 1822 - 1828 Digital edition by the University and State Library Düsseldorf
