= Johann Joseph Scherer =

German chemist (1814–1869)

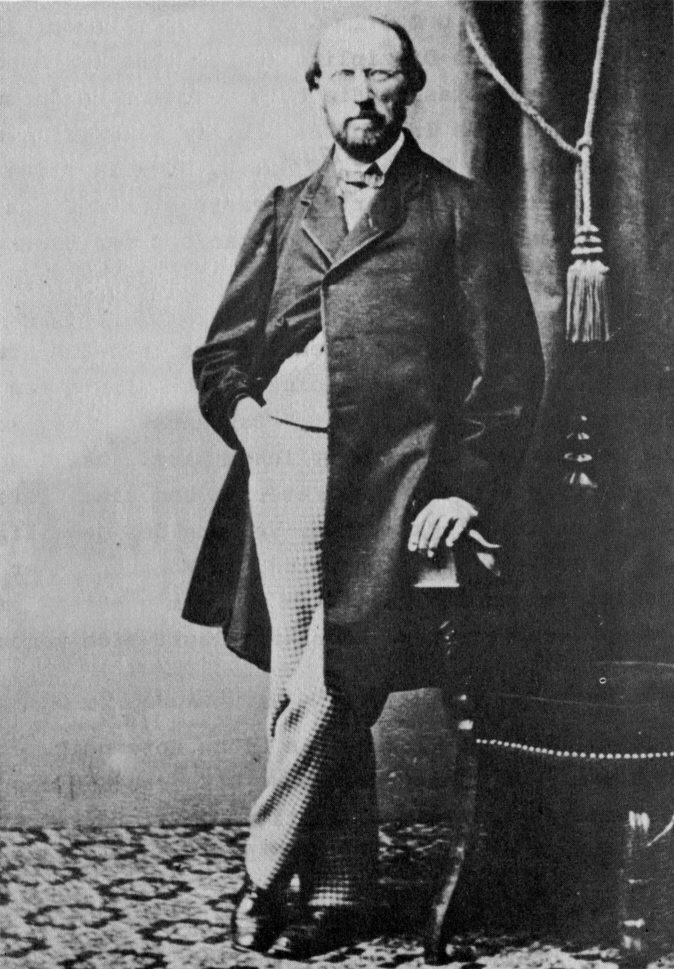
- Born: 18 March 1814
- Died: 17 February 1869 (aged 54)
- Occupations: Chemist, physician

Johann Joseph Scherer (18 March 1814 – 17 February 1869) was a German medical doctor and chemist born in Aschaffenburg.

In 1836, he graduated from the University of Würzburg, where he studied medicine, chemistry, geology and mineralogy. From 1836 to 1838, he practiced medicine in Wipfeld, and relocated afterwards to the Ludwig-Maximilians-Universität München, where he resumed his studies in chemistry.

In 1840, he worked in the laboratory of Justus Liebig (1803-1873) at Giessen, returning to Würzburg in 1842 as a professor of organic chemistry. During his career at Würzburg, he held the title of professor in the departments of general, inorganic, and pharmacological chemistry, also attaining directorship of the Medical Institute for Chemistry and Hygiene.

Scherer was a pioneer of clinical chemistry, and is remembered for applying his knowledge of chemistry to problems in the field of medicine. He made contributions in the study of urine and blood in pathological conditions, and in 1843 and 1851 demonstrated the presence of lactic acid in human blood under conditions such as hemorrhagic and septic shock. He is also credited with the discoveries of inositol and the purine derivative known as hypoxanthine.

Beginning in 1852, with Rudolf Virchow (1821-1902) and Gottfried Eisenmann (1795-1867), he was co-editor of Karl Friedrich Canstatt’s annual reports, Jahresbericht über die Leistungen und Fortschritte der gesammten Medicin. One of his better known publications was the 1843 book Chemische und Mikroskopische Untersuchungen zur Pathologie angestellt an den Kliniken des Julius-Hospitales zu Würzburg (Chemical and microscopic investigations of pathology performed at the Julius Hospital Clinic at Würzburg).

== Bibliography ==
- Kompanje, E. J.; Jansen, T. C.; Van Der Hoven, B.; Bakker, J. (Nov 2007). "The first demonstration of lactic acid in human blood in shock". Intensive Care Med. 33 (11): 1967–71. doi:10.1007/s00134-007-0788-7. PMC 2040486. PMID 17661014.
- Clinical chemistry Justus Liebig and Animal Chemistry
- Autobiographical Outline of Rudolf Virchow, Manuscripts
- Contrasts in Scientific Style: Research Groups in Chemistry (biographical information)
