= Ludwig Andreas Buchner =

German pharmacologist

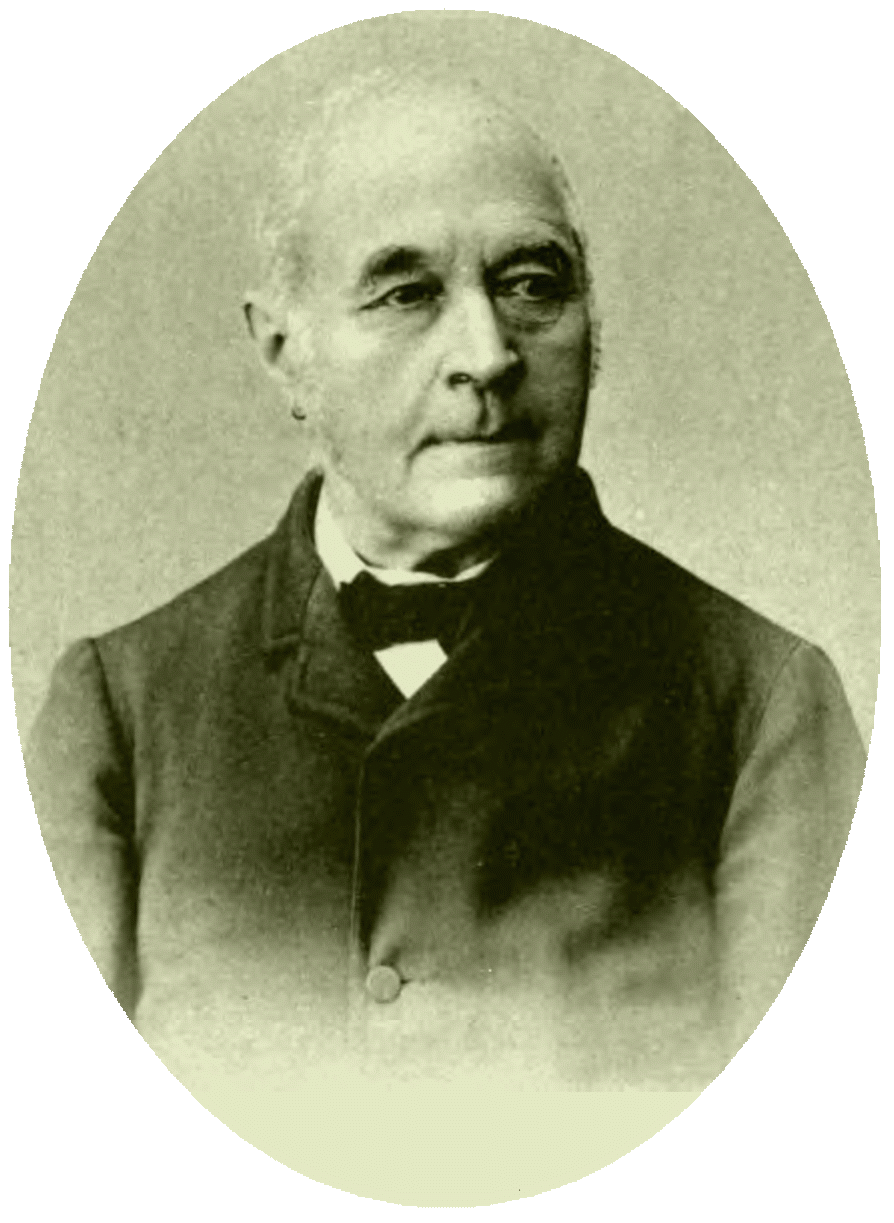
- Born: 23 July 1813; Munich
- Died: 23 October 1897 (aged 84); Munich
- Education: University of Giessen University of Paris

Ludwig Andreas Buchner (23 July 1813, Munich – 23 October 1897, Munich) was a German pharmacologist. His father was pharmacologist Johann Andreas Buchner (1783-1852).

== Academic background ==
After attending classes in Munich, he continued his education at the Universities of Giessen and Paris. In 1839, he obtained his PhD, followed by his doctorate of medicine in 1842. In 1847, he became an associate professor of physiological and pathological chemistry at Munich, followed by a full professorship of pharmacy and toxicology in 1852.

In 1849, he became a member of the Imperial Bavarian Academy of Sciences in Munich.

== Contributions ==
From 1852 to 1876, he was editor of the Repertorium für die Pharmacie, a journal founded by his father. In 1872, he published Commentar zur Pharmacopoea Germanica (two volumes with Germanicized text). Also, he is credited with contributing a number of articles to the Allgemeine Deutsche Biographie.

== Works ==
- Commentar zur Pharmacopoea Germanica mit verdeutschendem Texte : für Apotheker, Aerzte und Medicinal-Beamte; in 2 Bden. Bd. 2,1 . Oldenbourg, München 1878 Digital edition by the University and State Library Düsseldorf
- Commentar zur Pharmacopoea Germanica mit verdeutschendem Texte : für Apotheker, Aerzte und Medicinal-Beamte; in 2 Bden. Bd. 2,2 . Oldenbourg, München 1884 Digital edition by the University and State Library Düsseldorf
