= Margaret Buechner =

American composer (1922–1998)

Margaret Buechner (May 27, 1922 – June 8, 1998) was a German-born American composer.

== Biography ==
Born in Hanover, she emigrated to the United States in 1951 and became an American citizen in 1961. Little is known about Buechner's life in Germany, but she did compose during the 1950s before taking a 30 year hiatus that did not end until in 1989. She was married to Werner Buechner, but the couple divorced in the early 1970s. They stayed on cordial terms, and Werner called himself Margaret's "manager." He remained committed to promoting her compositional career until he died in 2001.

She died in Midland, Michigan, at the age of 76.

=== Career and works ===
Her works include the ballets Phantomgreen and Elizabeth, along with tone poems The Old Swedes Church and Erlkönig (based on the Goethe poem). Other major works are two related to her adopted country: Liberty Bell for chorus and orchestra, which incorporates a 1959 recording of the actual bell by Columbia Records, and the "symphonic trilogy" The American Civil War. One of her orchestral works was premiered by the Delaware Symphony in 1959 under the direction of Van Lier Lanning. Her music was also recorded in 1961 by musicians at the Interlochen Center for the Arts and broadcast by the University of Michigan radio service as part of a feature of "Music by Michigan Composers."

Her manuscripts are held by Juris Zoommers.

== Selected works ==
=== Ballet ===
- The Key, Easter Ballet for Children
- Phantomgreen
- Elizabeth/Immensee, based on the short story by Theodor Storm

=== Orchestral ===
- Der Bürgerkrieg (The Civil War)
- The Old Swedes Church
- Erlkönig

=== Choral ===
- Liberty Bell for chorus and orchestra
