= Fredric R. Mann =

American industrialist, diplomat and philanthropist

- Born: September 13, 1903; Russia
- Died: February 26, 1987 (aged 83); Miami, Florida, United States
- Education: Wharton School of Business
- Occupations: Industrialist, diplomat and philanthropist
- Known for: United States Special Representative to several Caribbean islands and patron of the arts

Fredric R. Mann (September 13, 1903 – February 26, 1987) was an American industrialist and patron of the arts who helped finance music centers in Philadelphia and Tel Aviv. He was the first United States Ambassador to Barbados, serving from 1967 until 1969. In 1968, his portfolio expanded to being United States Special Representative to several Caribbean islands.

He explained his philanthropy by saying: “The Hebrew word for charity is tzedakah, which really means justice. If you live opulently, you have to share with the less fortunate.”

== Personal life ==
Mann was born in Russia and came to the United States in 1905, moving to New Haven. Mann graduated from the Wharton School of Business at the University of Pennsylvania. He died of cancer in Miami at the age of 83 years and had homes in Miami, Philadelphia, and Manhattan.

== Career ==
In his 20s, Mann founded and directed the Seaboard Container Company which made cardboard boxes. It was known later as the National Container Corporation, and still later as Mann Kraft.

== Patronage ==
As an arts patron, Mann arranged for Zubin Mehta's first conducting appearance in the United States at Robin Hood Dell (which became the Mann Center for the Performing Arts after a move to the Centennial District) in 1960. He was one of the founders of what is now known as the Israel Philharmonic Orchestra. Because he provided much of the financing for their auditorium which opened in 1957, it was named the Fredric R. Mann Auditorium. He gifted Yefim Bronfman his first piano in 1974.

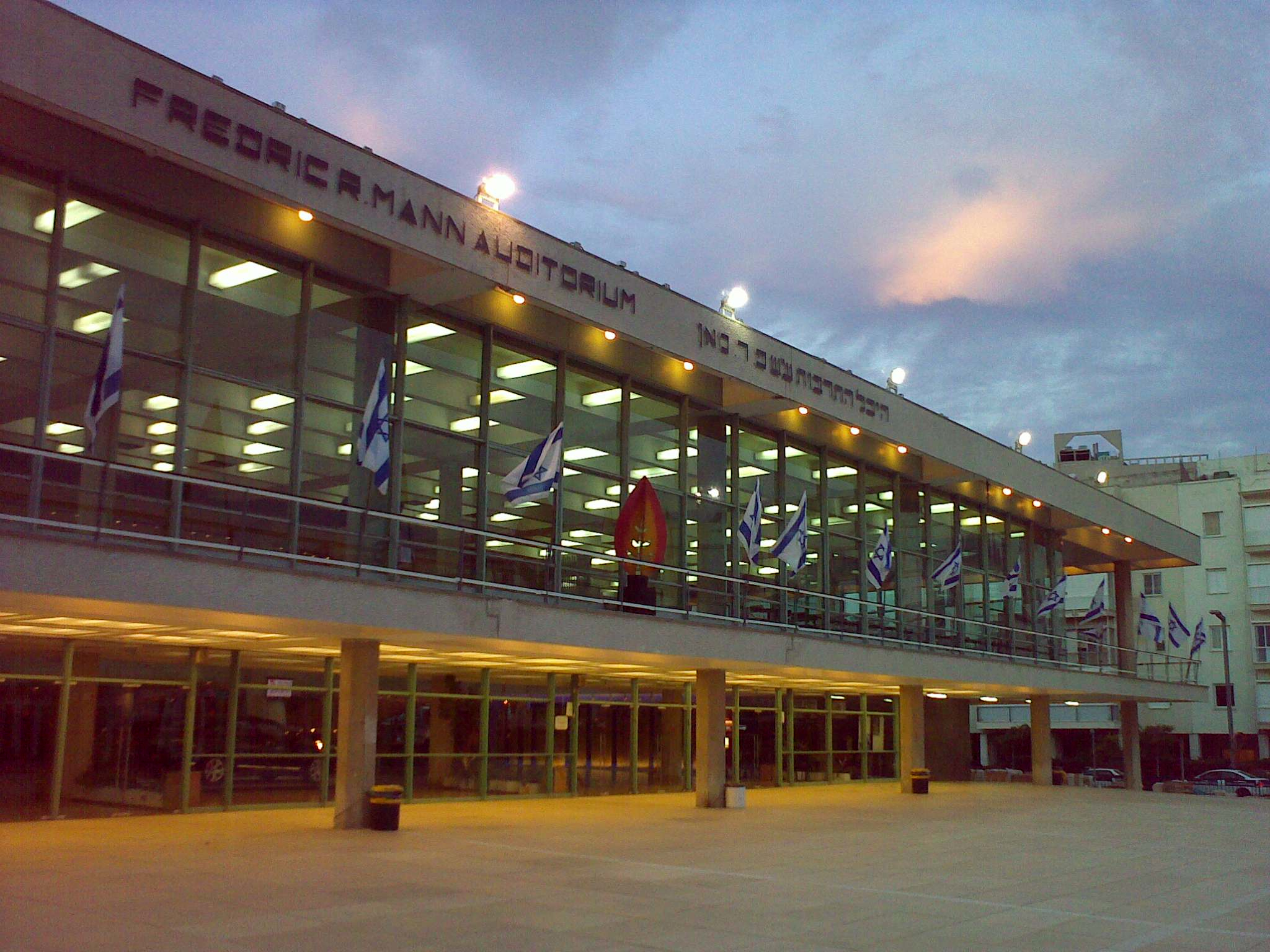

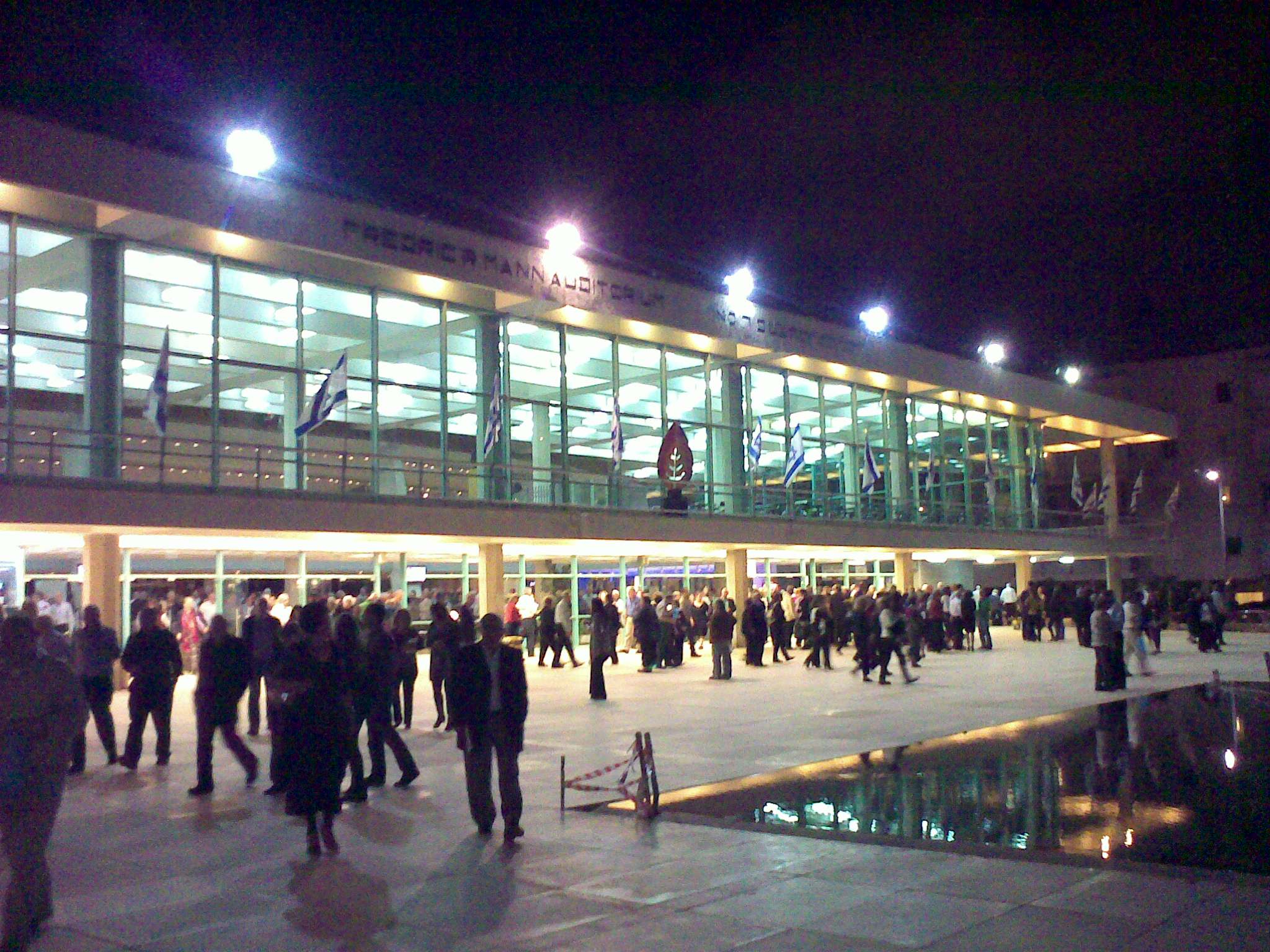
