= Life, Death, Live and Freedom =

Live album by John Mellencamp
- Released: June 23, 2009
- Recorded: Air Canada Centre, Toronto February 6, 2008 Mann Music Center, Philadelphia July 8, 2008 Greek Theatre, Los Angeles, July 31, 2008,
- Genre: Folk rock
- Length: 32:45
- Label: Hear Music
- Producer: John Mellencamp, Mike Wanchic

John Mellencamp chronology
Life, Death, Love and Freedom (2008)	Life, Death, Live and Freedom (2009)	On the Rural Route 7609 (2010)

Professional ratings
Review scores
Source	Rating
Anti-Music.com	4/5
Classic Rock Revisited	B
Ultimate Guitar Archive	7.7/10

Life, Death, Live and Freedom is a 2009 live album by John Mellencamp featuring eight songs from his 2008 album Life, Death, Love and Freedom. It was released on June 23, 2009.

== Overview ==
The album features live versions of eight songs that eventually wound up on Mellencamp's album Life, Death, Love and Freedom. Many of these live versions were recorded prior to the release of the studio album. As opposed to the subdued arrangements on the album that was eventually released, many of the tracks feature a full rock 'n' roll band; they are also played in higher keys, allowing Mellencamp to sing in a more familiar shouting style. Some tracks are performed solo acoustic by Mellencamp with no other musicians present. Many of the tracks on "Life, Death, Live, and Freedom" provide an interesting contrast with the versions that were released on its studio counterpart.

== Track listing ==
1. "If I Die Sudden" (recorded: Greek Theatre/Los Angeles, July 31, 2008)
2. "Troubled Land" (recorded: Greek Theatre/Los Angeles, July 31, 2008)
3. "Don't Need This Body" (recorded: Mann Music Center/Philadelphia, July 8, 2008)
4. "Longest Days" (recorded: Greek Theatre/Los Angeles, July 31, 2008)
5. "Young Without Lovers" (recorded: Air Canada Centre/Toronto, February 6, 2008)
6. "A Ride Back Home" (recorded: Air Canada Centre/Toronto, February 6, 2008)
7. "Jena" (recorded: Centrum/Red Deer, AB, February 14, 2008)
8. "My Sweet Love" (recorded: Greek Theatre/Los Angeles, July 31, 2008)

== Personnel ==
- John Mellencamp – vocals, acoustic guitar
- Andy York – guitar
- Dane Clark – drums
- John Gunnell – bass
- Miriam Sturm – violin
- Troy Kinnett – accordion, keyboard
- Mike Wanchic – guitar
