= Sean Kenney (artist) =

American artist (born 1976)

Sean Kenney (born August 22, 1976) is a New York-based artist recognized by The Lego Group as a Lego Certified Professional. He is best known for creating scale models, sculptures, and portraits with Lego toys.

== Early career and childhood ==
Born in New York City, Kenney pursued cartooning as a child and became a published cartoonist by the age of 18. He later studied Computer Science, Philosophy, and Visual Arts at Rutgers University, beginning a career as a graphic designer, and web designer. He received his first Lego toys at the age of 4, and continued to play with them through and into his adult years.

== Career ==
=== Lego artist ===
At the age of 27, Kenney began creating Lego sculptures professionally from his studio in New York City. Early work included renditions of New York landmarks like Greenwich Village and The Empire State Building, before giving way to larger commissioned sculptures and artistic pieces for companies such as Google, Mazda, and JP Morgan Chase. His work has been featured on ABC's Good Morning America, BBC's "Arts Extra", Fuji TV's Lovemarks documentary, ELLE magazine, New York magazine, and a retrospective book entitled 50 years of the LEGO Brick. In 2009, he released his first book, Cool Cars and Trucks.

Kenney's work has been placed on public display at:

- The Empire State Building in New York, New York
- FAO Schwarz in New York, New York
- Google offices in New York, New York and Copenhagen, Denmark
- Uppercase Gallery in Calgary, Canada
- Philadelphia Zoo's Creatures of Habitat (April 10 – October 31, 2010)
- Denver Museum of Science and Nature's "Brick Planet" in Denver, Colorado (November 2025 - May 2026)

=== Community leader ===
In 2003, Kenney founded a LEGO community website called MOCpages, centered on the sharing of one's Lego creations. In May 2020, MOCpages was shut down.

=== Books ===
Kenney has created several children's books on creating LEGO sculptures.

- Cool Cars and Trucks, Henry Holt and Co., 2009
- Cool Robots, Henry Holt and Co., 2010
- Cool City, Henry Holt and Co., 2011
- Amazing ABC, Henry Holt and Co., 2012
- Cool Castles, Henry Holt and Co., 2012
- Cool Creations in 35 Pieces, Henry Holt and Co., 2013
- Cool Creations in 101 Pieces, Henry Holt and Co., 2014
- Cool Creations 125 Pieces, Henry Holt and Co., 2014

== See also ==
- Lego
