= Philadelphia Zoo =

Zoo in Philadelphia, Pennsylvania

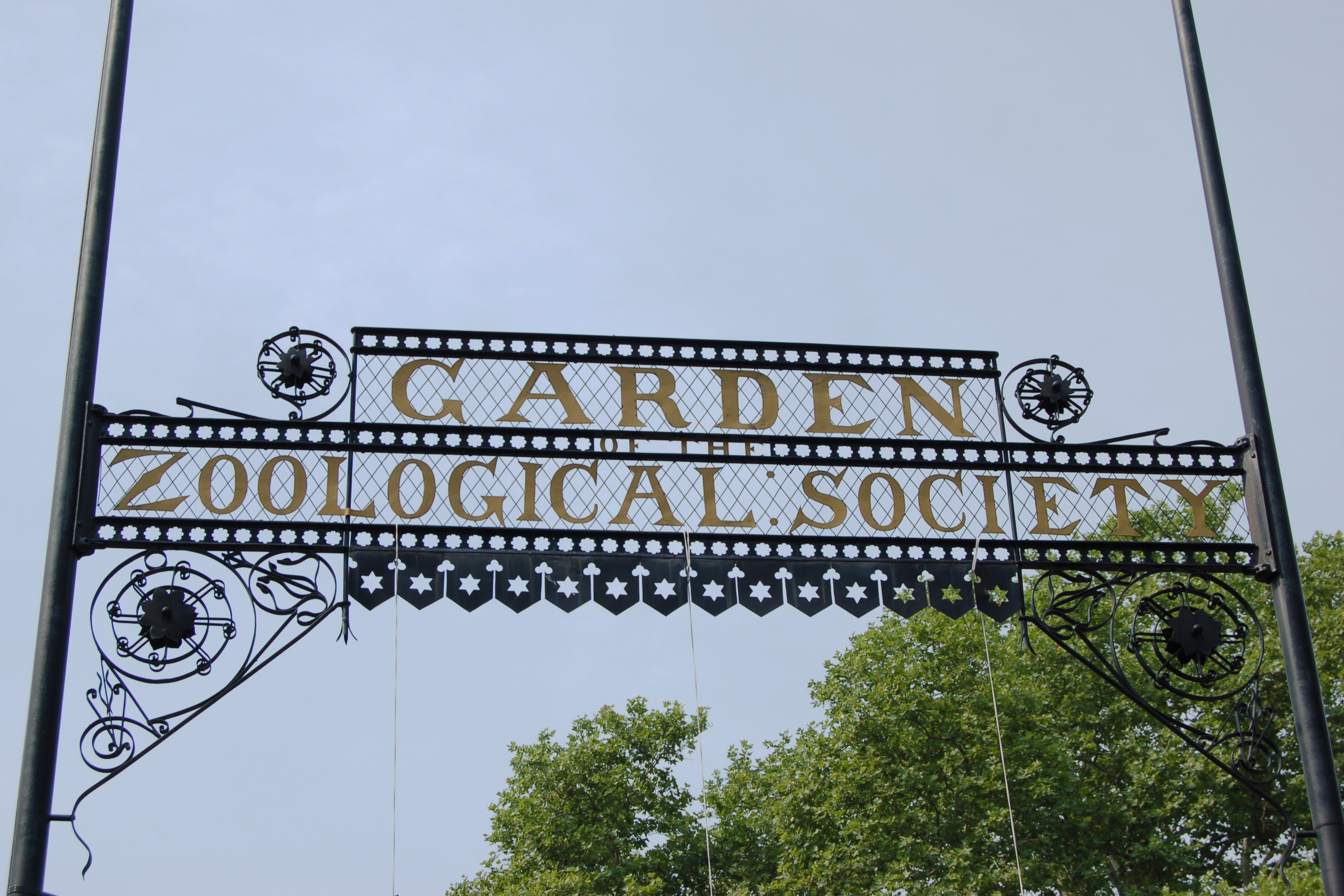
- The gate above the zoo's entrance
- Interactive map of Philadelphia Zoo
- 39°58′21″N 75°11′48″W
- Slogan: America's First Zoo
- Date opened: July 1, 1874; 152 years ago
- Location: Philadelphia, Pennsylvania, U.S.
- Land area: 42 acres (17 ha)
- No. of animals: ~1,700
- No. of species: 340+
- Annual visitors: 1.2 million
- Memberships: Association of Zoos and Aquariums
- Owner: The Zoological Society of Philadelphia
- Public transit: 34th Street: SEPTA bus: 38; Philly PHLASH
- Website: Official website

The Philadelphia Zoo is a zoo located in the Centennial District of Philadelphia on the west bank of the Schuylkill River. It was the first true zoo in the United States; it was chartered by the Commonwealth of Pennsylvania on March 21, 1859, but its opening was delayed by the Civil War until July 1, 1874. The zoo opened with 1,000 animals and an admission price of 25 cents. For a brief time, the zoo also housed animals brought to U.S. from safaris by the Smithsonian Institution, which had not yet built its National Zoo.

The Philadelphia Zoo is one of the premier zoos in the world for breeding animals that are difficult to breed in captivity. The zoo also works with many groups around the world to protect the natural habitats of the animals in their care.

The zoo is 42 acres (17 ha) and the home of nearly 1,300 animals, many of which are rare and endangered. Special features include a children's petting zoo, a rainforest themed carousel, chats with keepers, behind the scenes tours available for purchase, and many interactive and educational exhibits.

== History ==
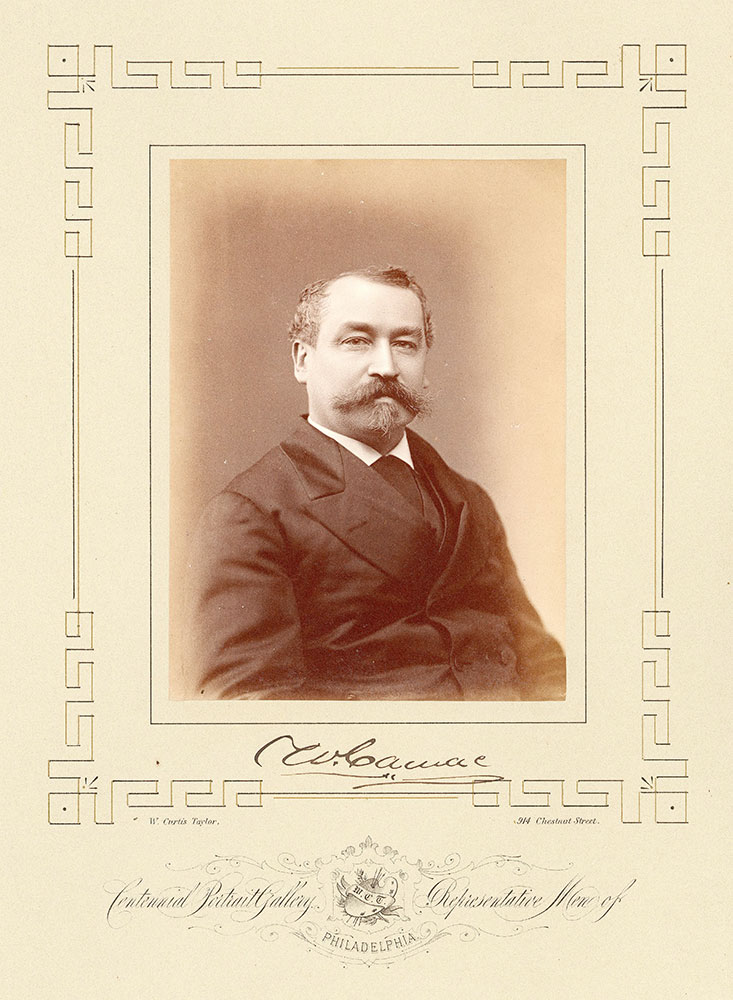
William Camac photograph by W. Curtis Taylor, Philadelphia Centennial Portrait Gallery Representative Men of Philadelphia

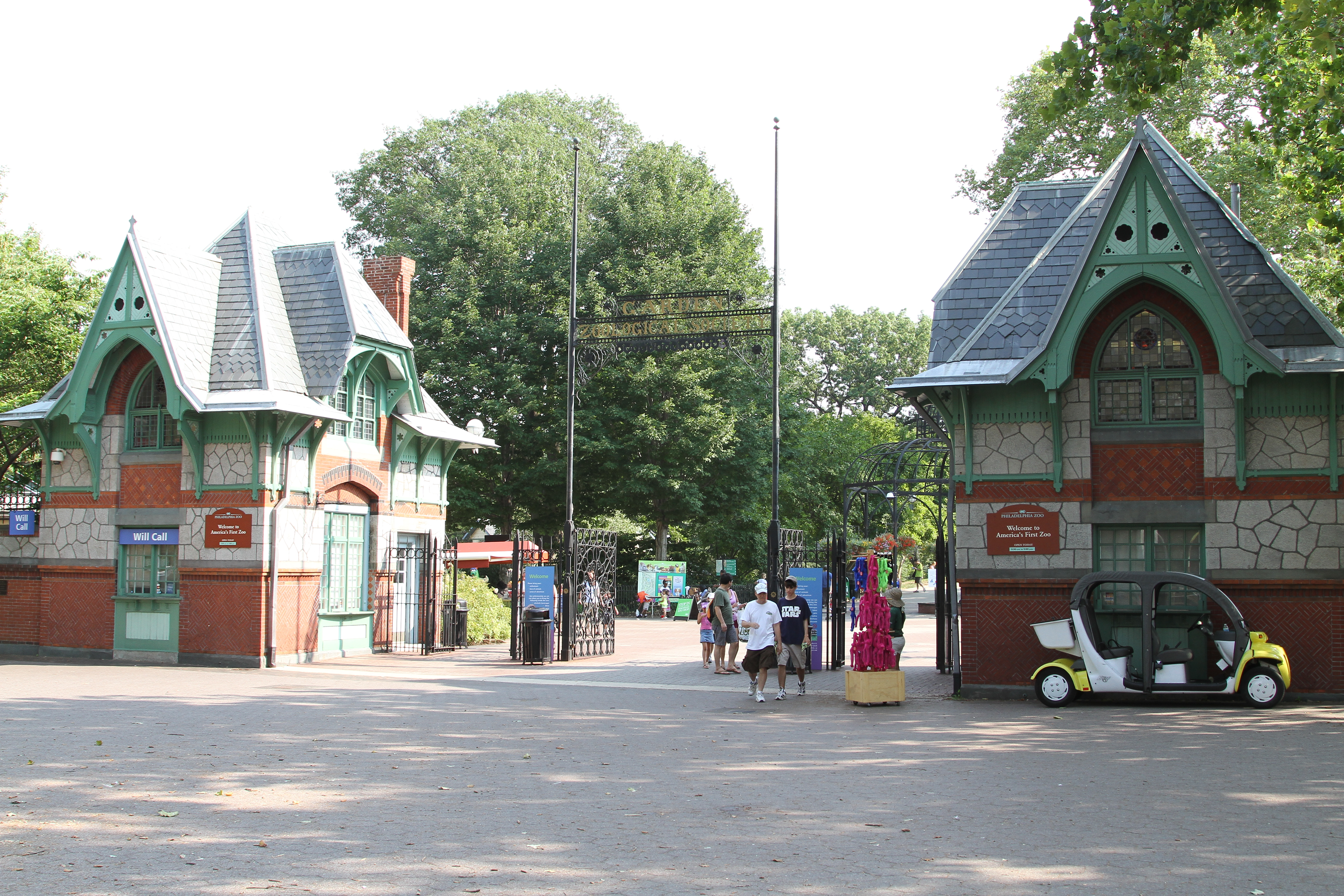
Victorian gateway by Frank Furness

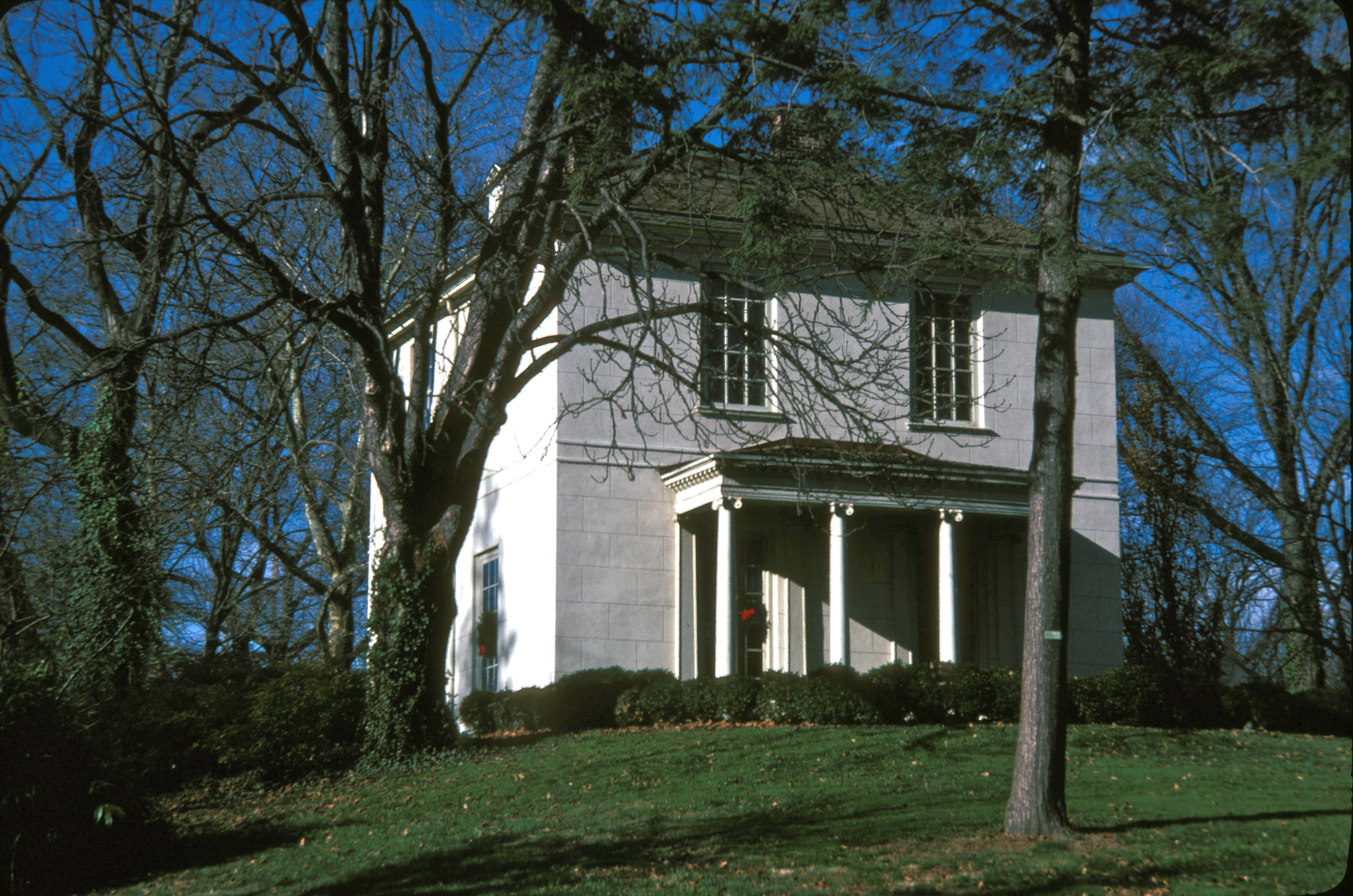
The Solitude, a mansion built by John Penn in 1785

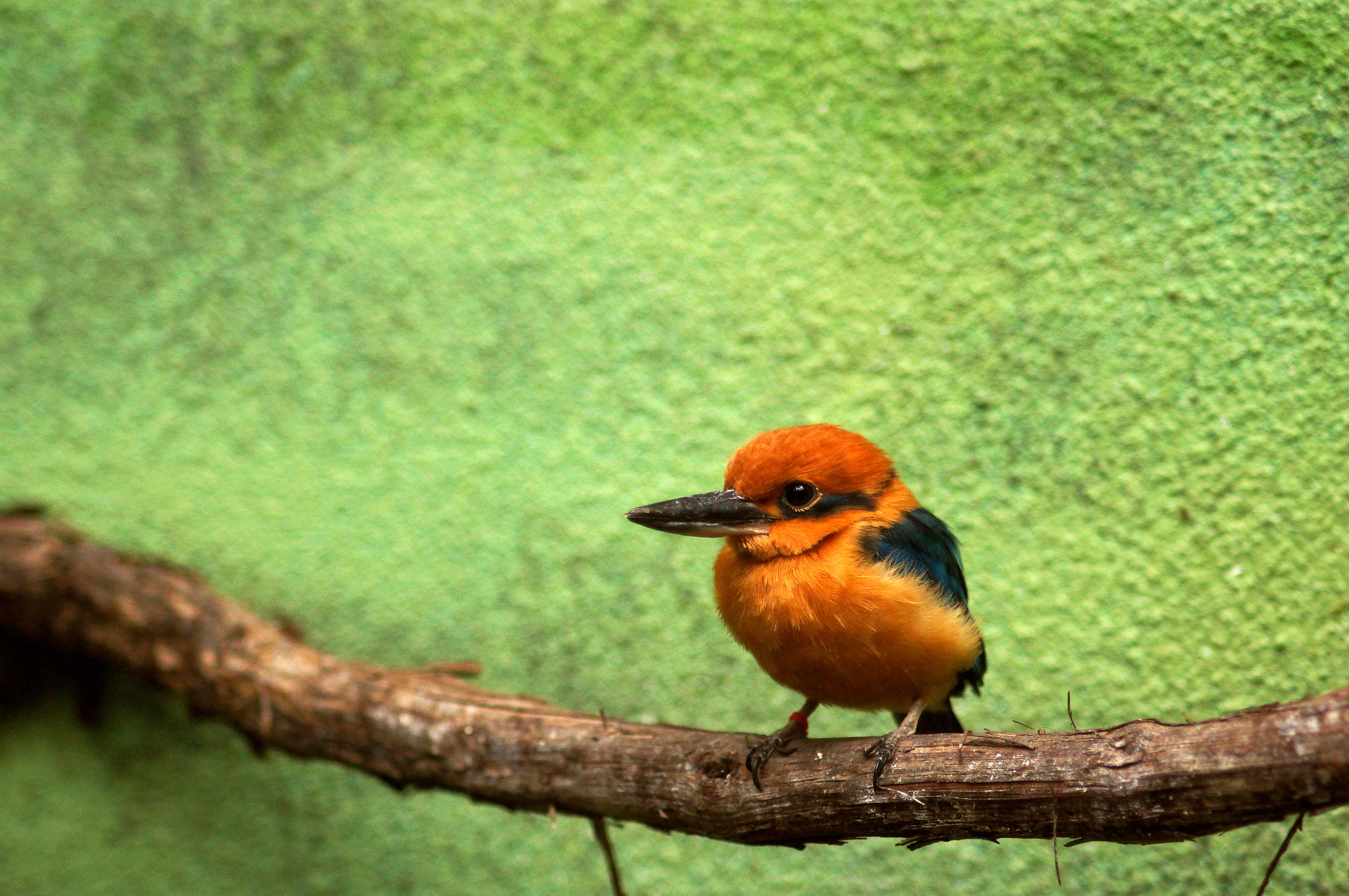
A Guam kingfisher, 2011

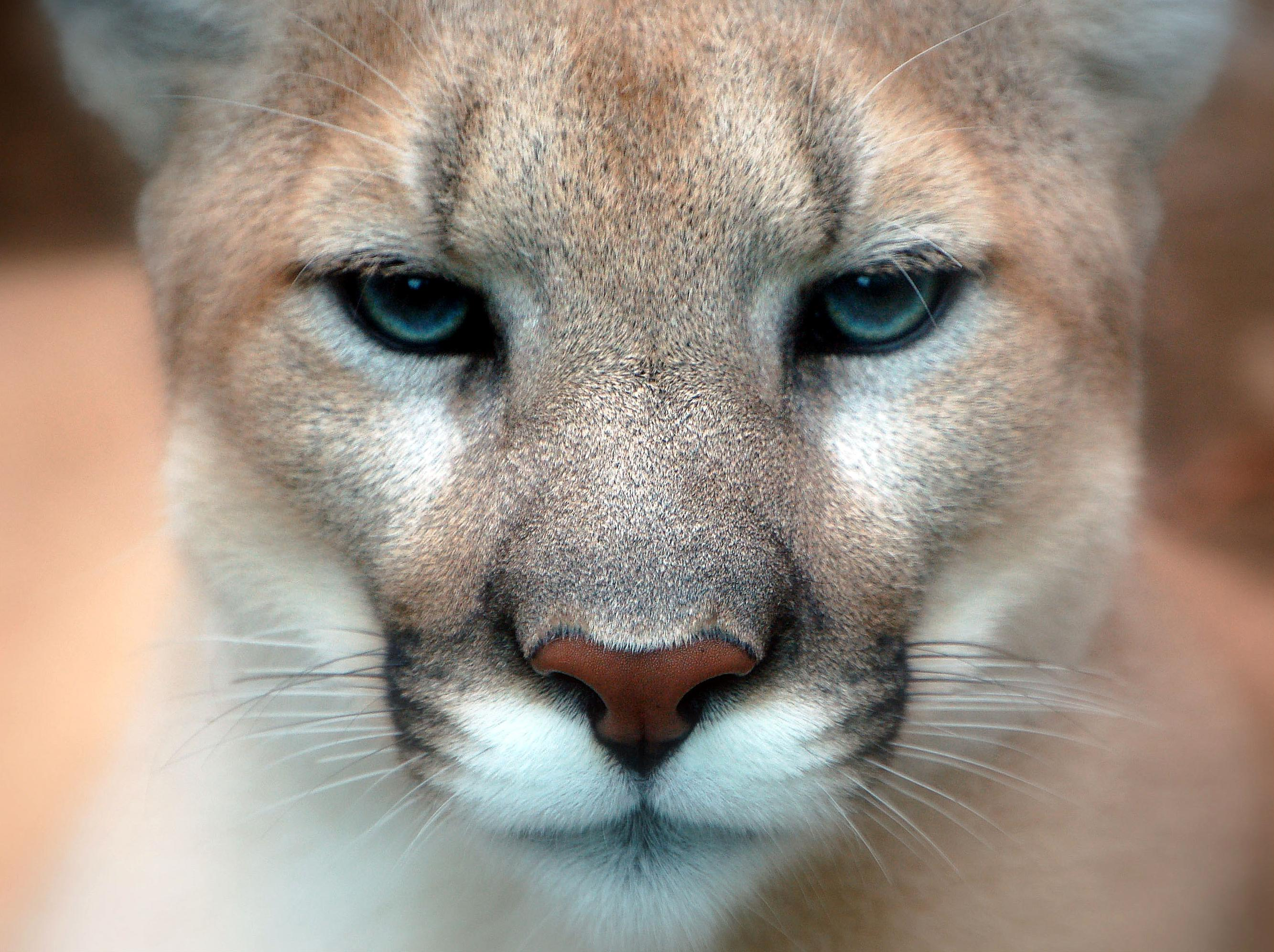
A cougar at Philadelphia Zoo, 2007

The opening of the London Zoo to the public in 1847 inspired America's intellectual class to show interest in building a zoo in the U.S. Dr. William Camac of Philadelphia had traveled throughout Europe in the 1850s and visited the London Zoo. Upon returning to the U.S. he advocated to build a Zoo in Philadelphia. On March 21, 1859, the Pennsylvania legislature incorporated the Zoological Society of Philadelphia. The incorporation paper reads: "The purpose of this corporation shall be the purchase and collection of living wild and other animals, for the purpose of public exhibition at some suitable place in the City of Philadelphia, for the instruction and recreation of the people." Camac worked with other Zoological Society members to raise funds and secured 33 acres on the West Philadelphia side of the Schuylkill River previously owned by John Penn, grandson of William Penn. The opening of the Zoo was delayed by the Civil War which lasted from 1861 to 1865.

When the Philadelphia Zoological Garden first opened its Victorian gates on July 1, 1874, to over 3,000 visitors, it was the only institution of its kind in the New World. The zoo began with varied exhibits containing 200 mammals, including buffalo, deer, wolves, foxes, bears, and monkeys, and 67 bird species and 15 reptiles. Reptiles and small mammals were housed in The Solitude, a mansion built by John Penn in 1785. A carriage house was located at the entrance for horses that had transported visitors to the zoo. The landscaping and architecture mimicked a Victorian garden atmosphere that is still represented in the present zoo grounds.

The 1876 Centennial Exposition was held in Fairmount Park, a few blocks from the 33-acre (13 ha) zoo. U.S. President Ulysses S. Grant had officiated at the Exposition and visited the zoo on April 23. Zoo attendance increased to nearly 680,000 visitors in 1876, a 36 percent increase over the preceding year, and set a record that would remain unmatched until nearly 858,000 visited in 1951.

The Penrose Research Laboratory was established in 1901. The first of its kind in any zoo, the Penrose Research Lab contributed to a reduced rate of disease, increased vigor, and longevity among zoo animals. In 1901, the lab began performing necropsies on every zoo animal that became ill and died. The lab's history of preventive medicine reflected the foresight of Dr. Charles B. Penrose and Dr. Cortland Y. White, professors at the Medical School of the University of Pennsylvania.

The zoo received railroad visitors at the Zoological Garden station on 34th Street and Girard Avenue from its opening in 1874 until the station was closed in 1902. Since 2013, zoo officials have been working to get the station restored and reopened, to potentially increase attendance and alleviate parking issues on their busiest days.

Philadelphia Zoo has developed a distinguished breeding program over the years and is credited with many "firsts" including: the first successful birth of an orangutan and a chimpanzee in a U.S. zoo in 1928, the first cheetahs born in a zoo in 1956, the first successful birth of an echidna in North America in 1983, and the first successful birth of a giant river otter in North America in 2004. The first recorded parent-reared Guam kingfisher was bred at the zoo in 1985.

Philadelphia Zoo also pioneered the first captive management of flamingos under the direction of curator emeritus John A. Griswold. Through innovative feeding techniques, the zoo was the first to gain the pink and red pigmentation of these birds. The zoo was the first to successfully breed Chilean and greater flamingos in captivity.

The brown tree snake was introduced to the island of Guam in the 1940s, and as a result, bird species endemic to the island were driven to extinction in the wild by the invasive serpent. In 1983, the Guam Bird Rescue Project was spearheaded by the Philadelphia Zoo in an attempt to save the Guam kingfisher and the Guam rail, two native species still present in large enough numbers to benefit from intervention. The rescue plan called for the capture of all kingfishers and rails on Guam, along with the development of a captive management program. The captive breeding was carried out in U.S. zoos in an effort to save the two species from extinction until reintroduction became feasible.

In the early morning of December 24, 1995, a fire in the World of Primates building killed 23 animals, including a family group of six western lowland gorillas, a family group of three orangutans, four white-handed gibbons, and 10 lemurs (two ruffed lemurs, six ring-tailed lemurs, and two mongoose lemurs). All were members of endangered species. The animals died in their sleep from smoke inhalation (carbon monoxide poisoning); none were burned. 10 primates housed in an adjoining building, the Discovery House, survived. At the time of the fire, detection equipment existed in only 20 percent of the zoo buildings; the primates building, which had been constructed in 1985, was not one of them. In the 10 months following the fire, the zoo installed fire detection equipment in all animal buildings.

On July 1, 1999, the zoo opened a new primate exhibit featuring 2.5 acres (10,000 m^{2}) of indoor and outdoor areas with 10 species of primates, including Sumatran orangutans, western lowland gorillas, lemurs, langurs, and gibbons. In 2006, the zoo opened a new big cat exhibit showcasing lions, Siberian tigers, Amur leopards, snow leopards, cougars, and jaguars in exhibit spaces reminiscent of their natural habitats. On May 30, 2009, the zoo opened a new aviary featuring two birds that are extinct in the wild: the Guam rail and the Guam kingfisher. In July 2009, the last two elephants, both African bush, were relocated to a sanctuary.

In 2010, a special exhibit called Creatures of Habitat was unveiled featuring 10 animal stations throughout the zoo, with endangered animals represented by more than 30 life-size Lego brick statues. The statues were created by Lego-certified professional artist Sean Kenney.

Philadelphia Zoo opened Treetop Trail in 2011, the first component of its Zoo360 animal exploration trail system. Zoo360 is a network of see-through mesh trails, consisting of elevated and ground-level structures, along which animals can explore the zoo away from their enclosures. Subsequent additions to the system include the Great Ape Trail, Big Cat Crossing, Gorilla Treeway, and Meerkat Maze.

On April 13, 2013, the zoo opened KidZooU on the site of the old Pachyderm House. Also known as the Hamilton Family Children's Zoo and Faris Family Education Center, it is one of the largest projects undertaken by the zoo and replaces the old Children's Zoo open for over 50 years prior. KidZooU is notable for many ecologically conscious features, such as rain gardens and cisterns, geothermal wells, and green roofs, making it the first LEED-certified exhibit at the zoo.

On December 29, 2016, Zenda, the oldest African lion in the U.S. zoo population, was euthanized following a sudden loss of appetite and failing health. Zenda was 25. On February 20, 2018, Coldilocks, a 37-year-old polar bear was euthanized after declining health including potential liver and spinal problems. The average age for a polar bear in the wild is 23 years.

In 2019, the zoo opened WildWorks, a 34 ft (10 m) high ropes course with bridges, ropes, and obstacles. Participants wore climbing harnesses. Two courses were available, each designed for a different age group and skill level. A smaller system for children under 48 in (120 cm) was also available. The attraction closed in 2023.

During the Holiday Season (Late November to Early January), the Philadelphia Zoo hosts a walking nighttime light show called Luminature. Luminature includes holiday music and over 1 million lights throughout 16 illuminated zones around the Zoo. There are also numerous shopping, food and drink outlets. The experience also includes actors dressed as illuminated animals and the chance to sit in a fire pit area and make s'mores.

During 2025, sixteen critically endangered western Santa Cruz tortoises were born.

For Luminature 2025, a 110 ft (34 m) ferris wheel has been added to the zoo, at the site of the former balloon ride. The Philly Zoo Pherris Wheel will stay through 2026.

== Exhibits ==
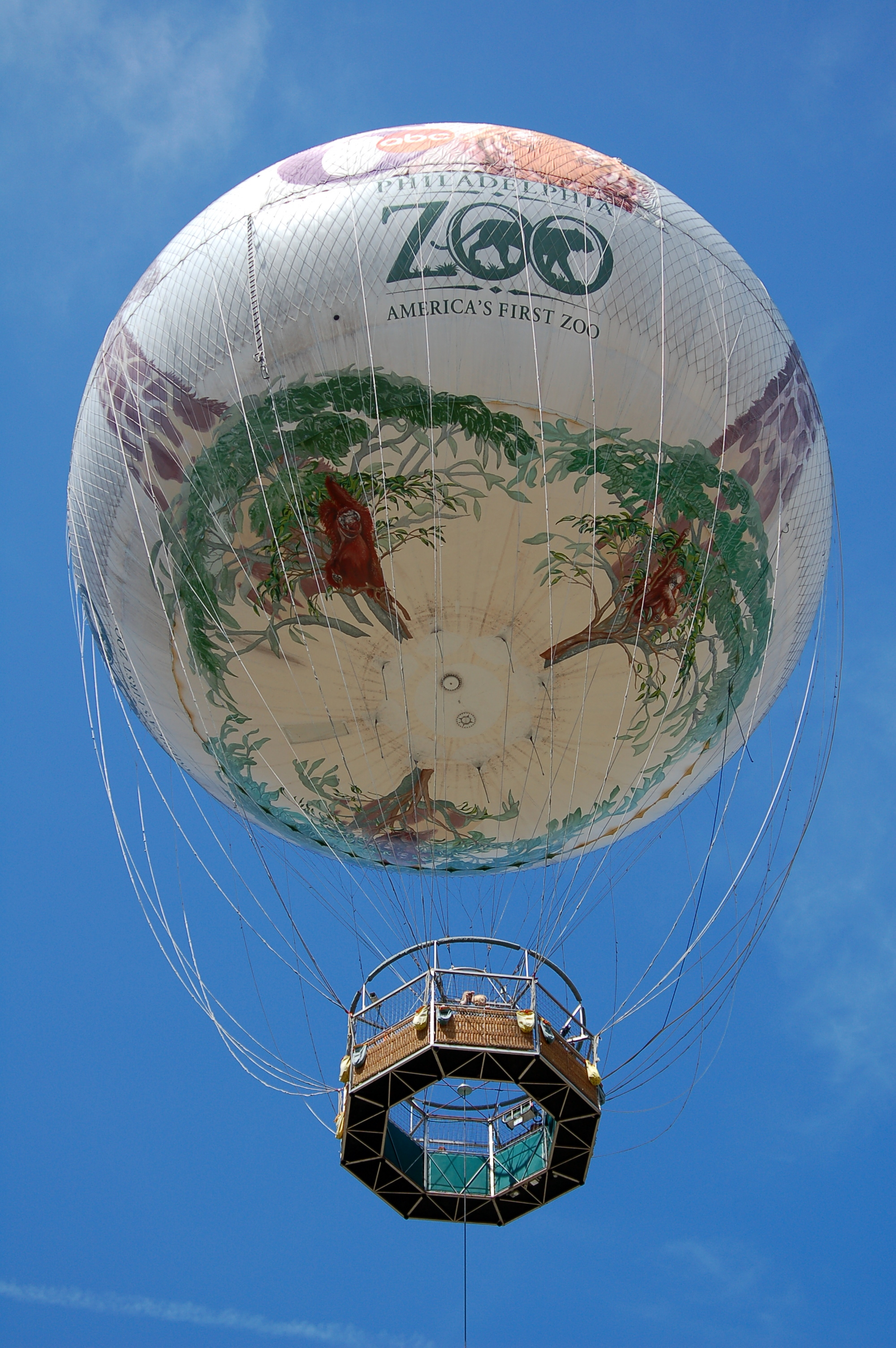
The Zooballoon in 2007, which was replaced by a ropes course and zip line in 2019

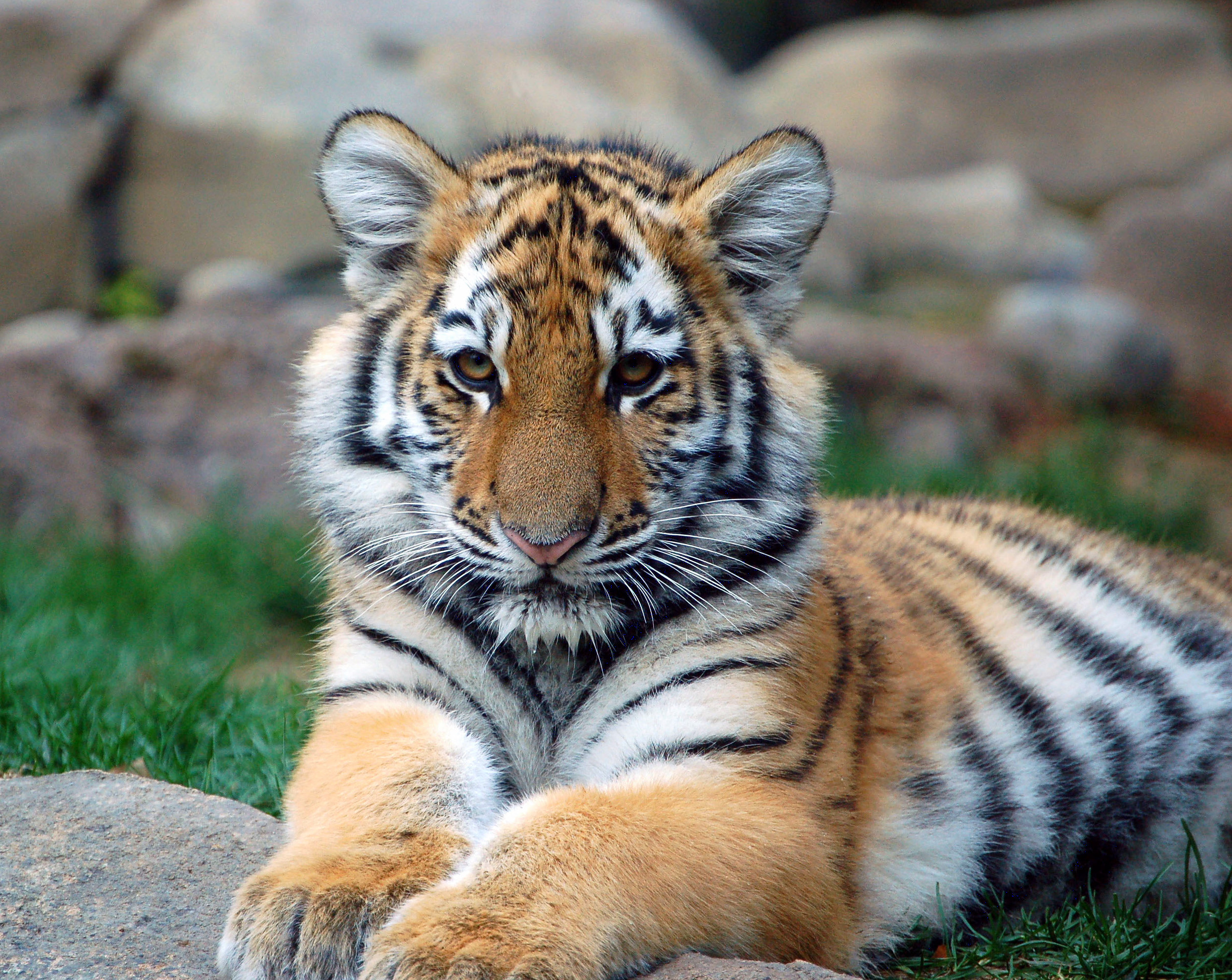
An Amur tiger cub at the zoo, 2007

- Zoo360: a first-of-its-kind animal trail system, consisting of five trails—Big Cat Crossing, Gorilla Treeway, Treetop Trail, Great Ape Trail, and Meerkat Maze—which allow the animals to travel along suspended and ground-level mesh structures throughout parts of the zoo.
- The Rare Animal Conservation Center: interactive graphics and up-close views of some of the world's most endangered animals including Rodrigues fruit bats, naked mole-rats, Brazilian porcupines, golden lion tamarins, François' langurs, and Bolivian gray titi monkeys.
- Hamilton Family KidZooU & Faris Family Education Center: a children's zoo with indoor and outdoor exhibits of smaller animals that include petting and feeding opportunities, and educational games.
- African Plains: features a southern white rhinoceros, Ankole cattle, red river hogs, reticulated giraffes, Grant's zebras, and hippos.
- McNeil Avian Center: an aviary featuring many species of birds, mainly from Africa, Asia and the Pacific Islands including the hamerkop, the great argus, the Congo peafowl, the golden pheasant, the pink-headed fruit dove, the Raggiana bird-of-paradise, the Nicobar pigeon, and the Victoria crowned pigeon, as well as the extinct-in-the-wild Guam kingfisher and the critically endangered Bali mynah.
- Bird Valley: features various species of geese, and trumpeter swans.
- Bear Country: features four sloth bears and an Andean bear.
- Big Cat Falls: features numerous species of wild cats including African lions, Amur tiger, Amur leopards, snow leopards, and cougars.
- Flamingo Cove: a walk-through aviary featuring American flamingos, greater flamingos, ibises, and waterfowl.
- Small Mammal House: used to feature small mammalian species such as pygmy loris, pygmy marmoset, harvest mouse, dwarf mongoose, Malagasy giant rat, Hoffmann's two-toed sloth, an Aardvark, and vampire bat. An outdoor trail system called Meerkat Maze allows the meerkats to travel through mesh tunnels near visitors. In 2023, a part of the Small Mammal House was replaced by Spiders Alive!, and it includes 17 species of spiders and other arachnids. There is also indoor viewing of the zoo's meerkats at the end of Spiders Alive!
- Outback Outpost: includes emus and a mob of red kangaroos.
- PECO Primate Reserve: opened in 1999 with primate species including Sumatran orangutans, western lowland gorillas, lar gibbons, mantled guerezas, spider monkeys, and five types of lemurs—aye-aye, black-and-white ruffed, Coquerel's sifaka, ring-tailed, and mongoose lemurs.
- Penguin Point: opened in June 2018 as a remodel of the former polar bear habitat, now houses 17 Humboldt penguins.
- Primate Passage: includes Francois' langurs.
- Raptor Ridge: is located in the southern corner of the zoo. It features few species of birds of prey including bald eagles, common barn owls, crested caracaras, turkey vultures, king vultures, and hooded vultures. Near those exhibits are enclosures for cheetahs and Abyssinian ground hornbills.
- The Reptile and Amphibian House: features many species of amphibians and reptiles, including giant tortoises, crocodilians, endangered amphibians, and the various lizards. It also features an outdoor yard for the Aldabra and Galápagos tortoises from April through October.
- Water is Life: features a family of rare giant otters (the first successfully bred giant otters in North America), red pandas, and common vampire bats.
- Wings of the World: a seasonal outdoor aviary where guests may hand-feed birds such as Indian peafowls, golden pheasants, Temminck's tragopans, and spotted doves.

Special behind-the-scenes experiences are offered, as well as overnight stays for scout groups, families, and youth groups. A summer concert series and other events occur annually at the zoo, such as Boo at the Zoo (Halloween), the Summer Ale Festival, and the Global Conservation Gala.

== Gallery ==
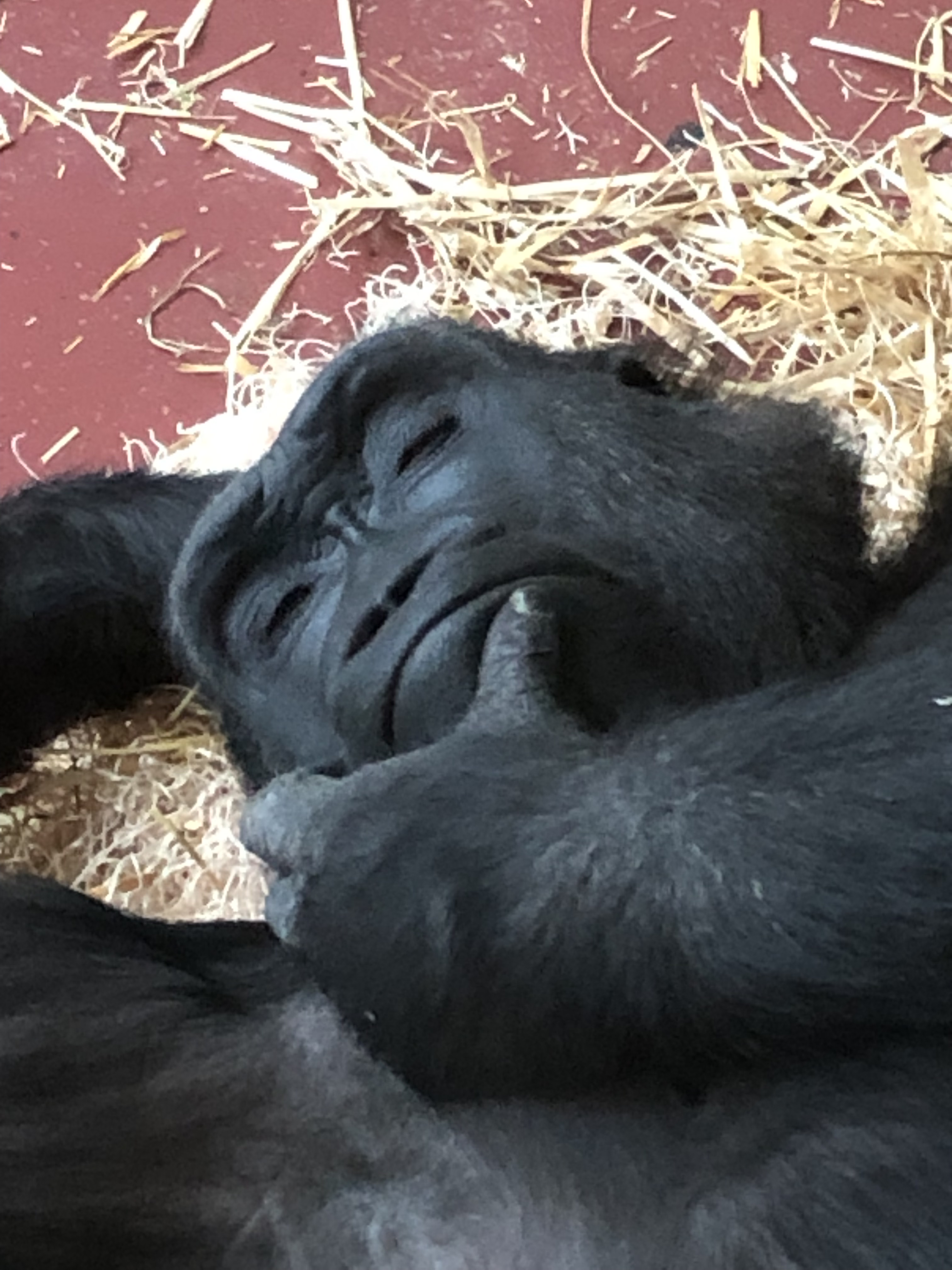
A Western lowland gorilla

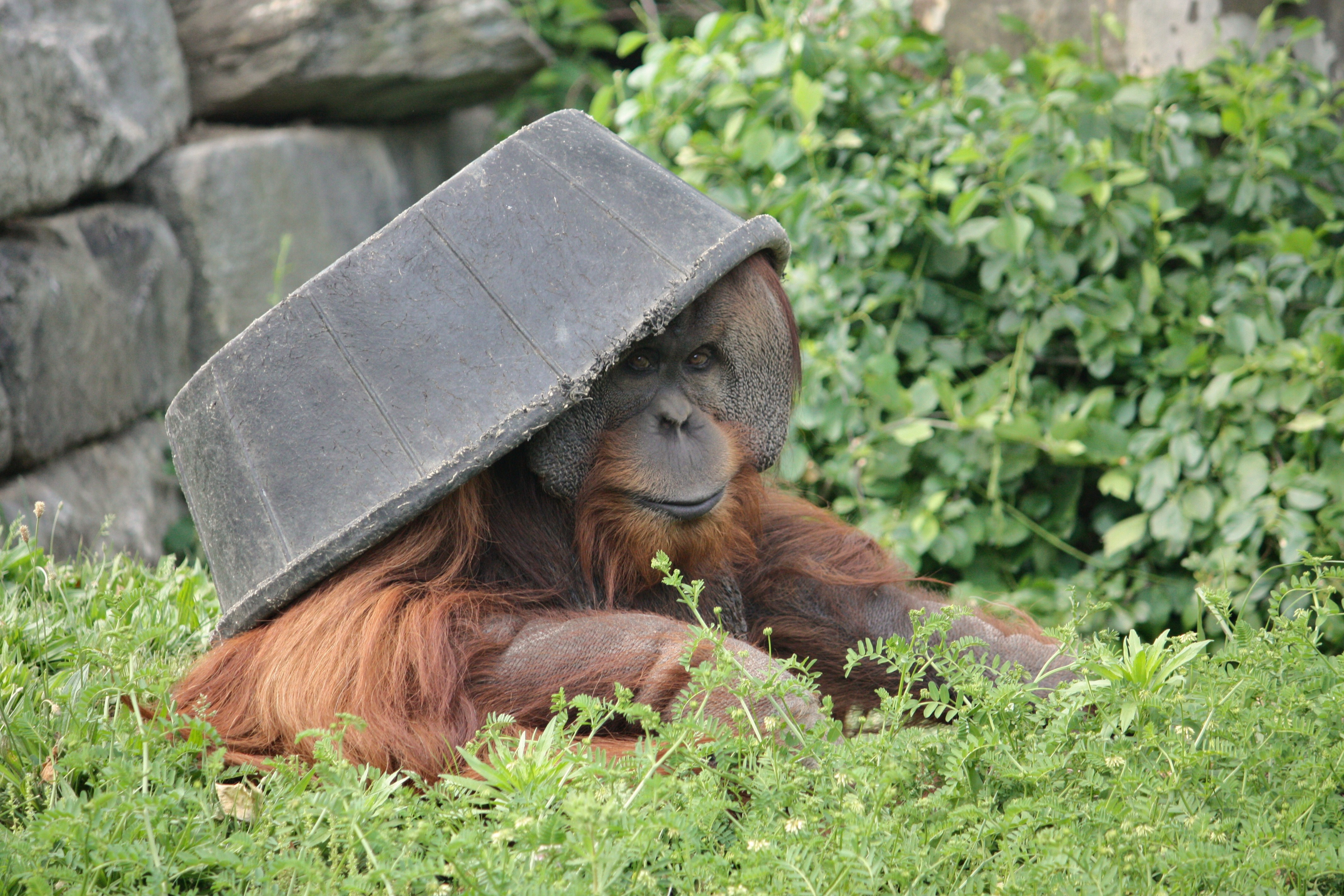
A Sumatran orangutan

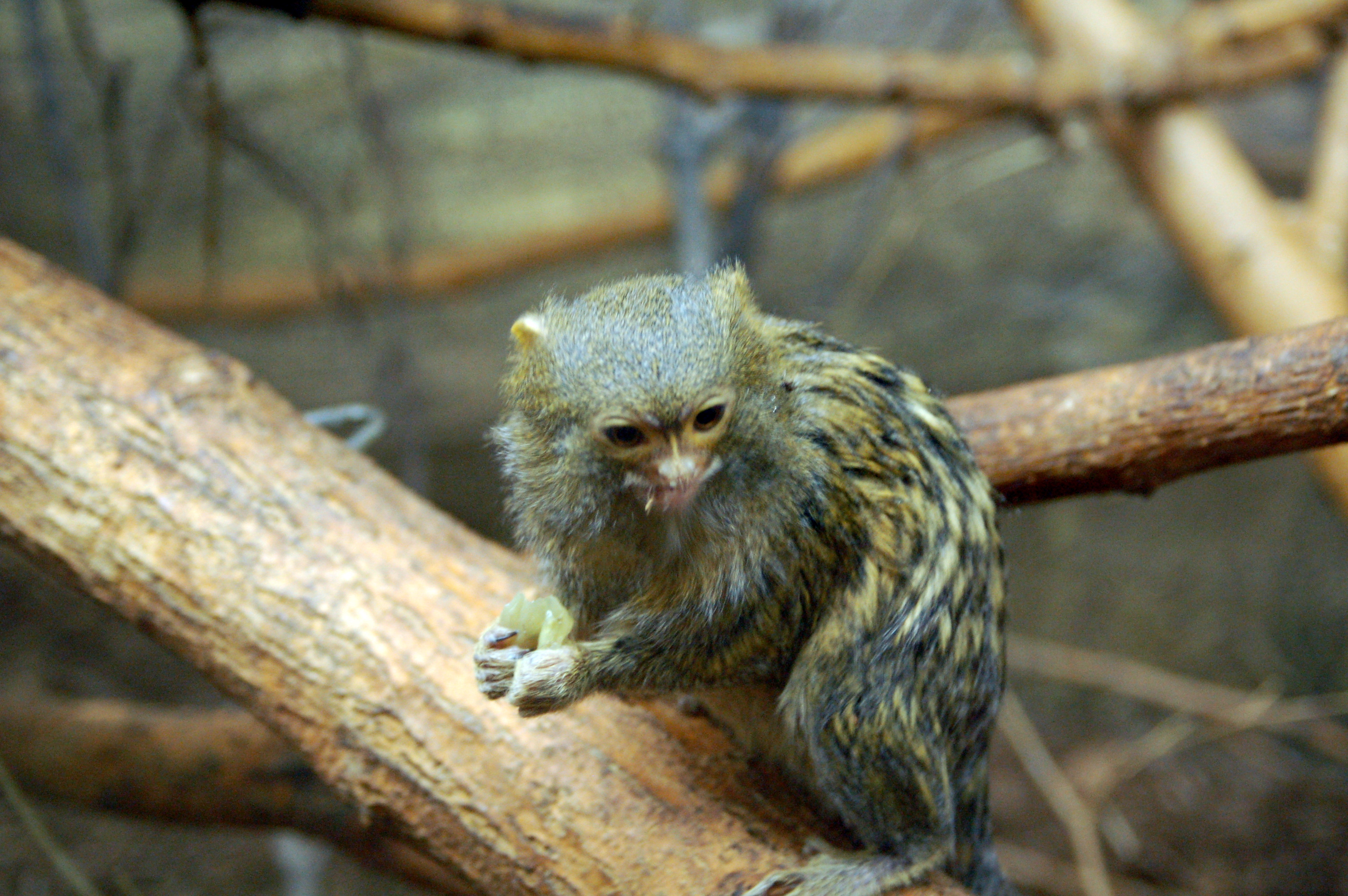
A pygmy marmoset

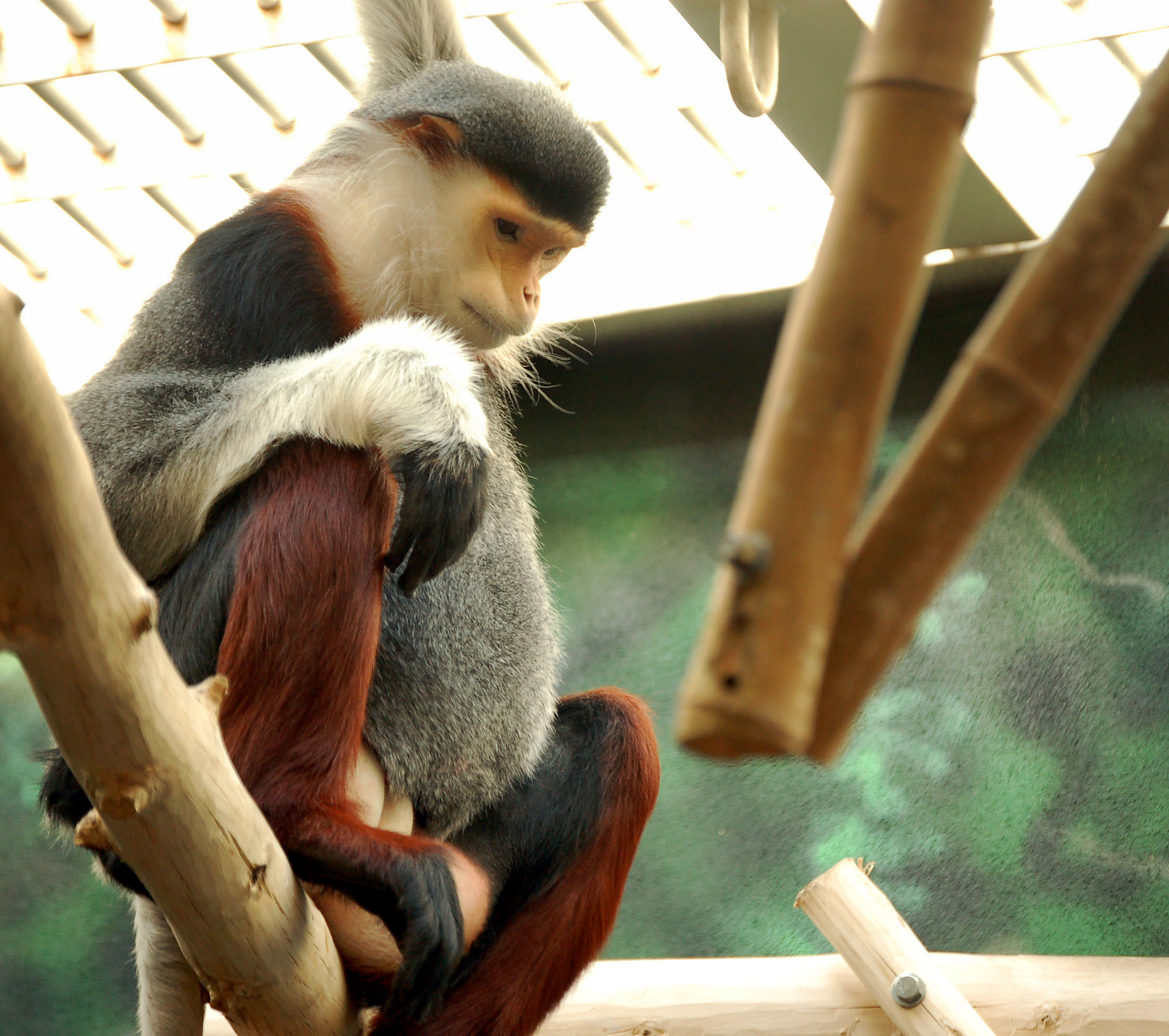
A red-shanked douc, last held by the zoo in 2018

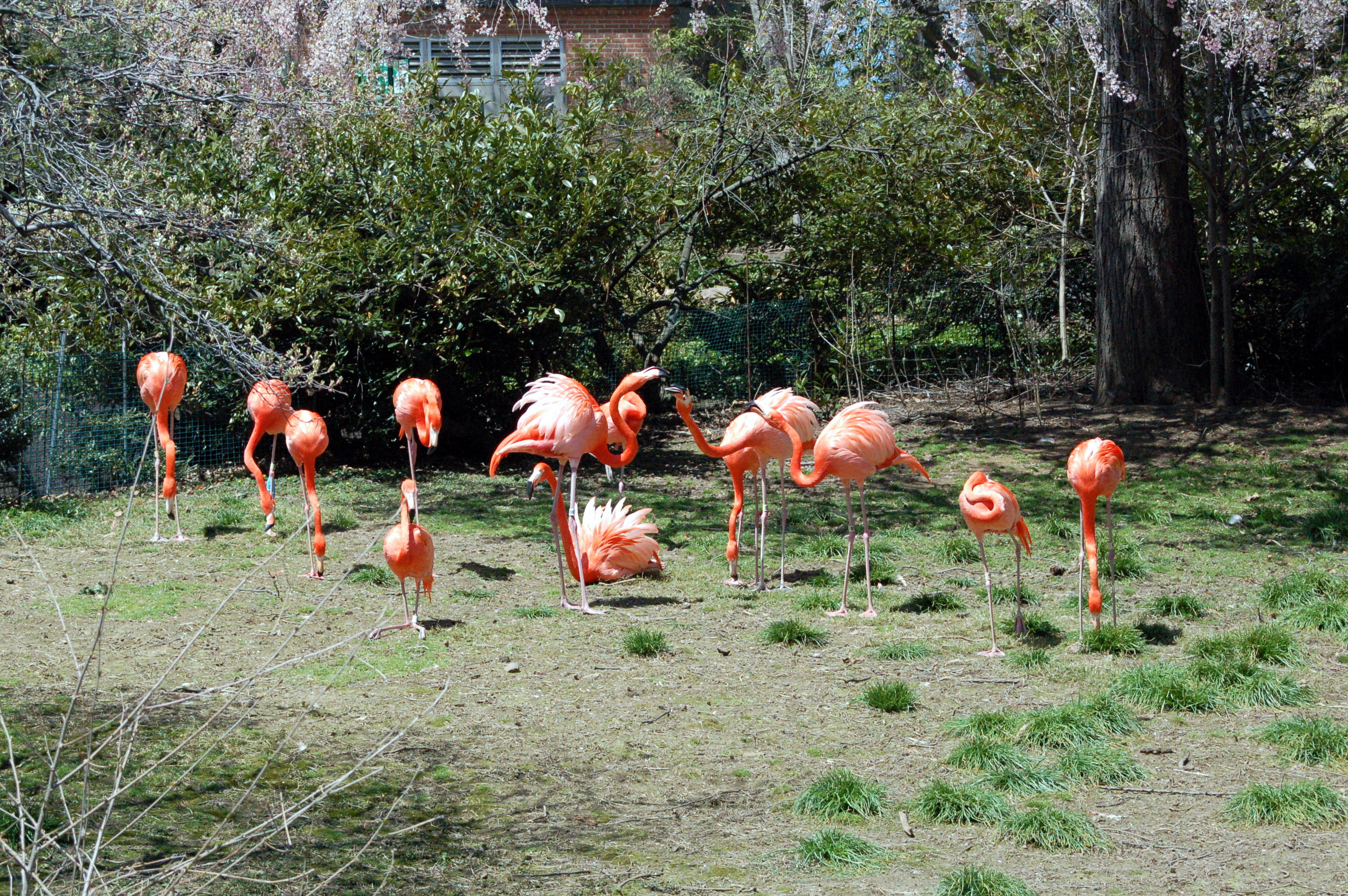
A flock of American flamingos

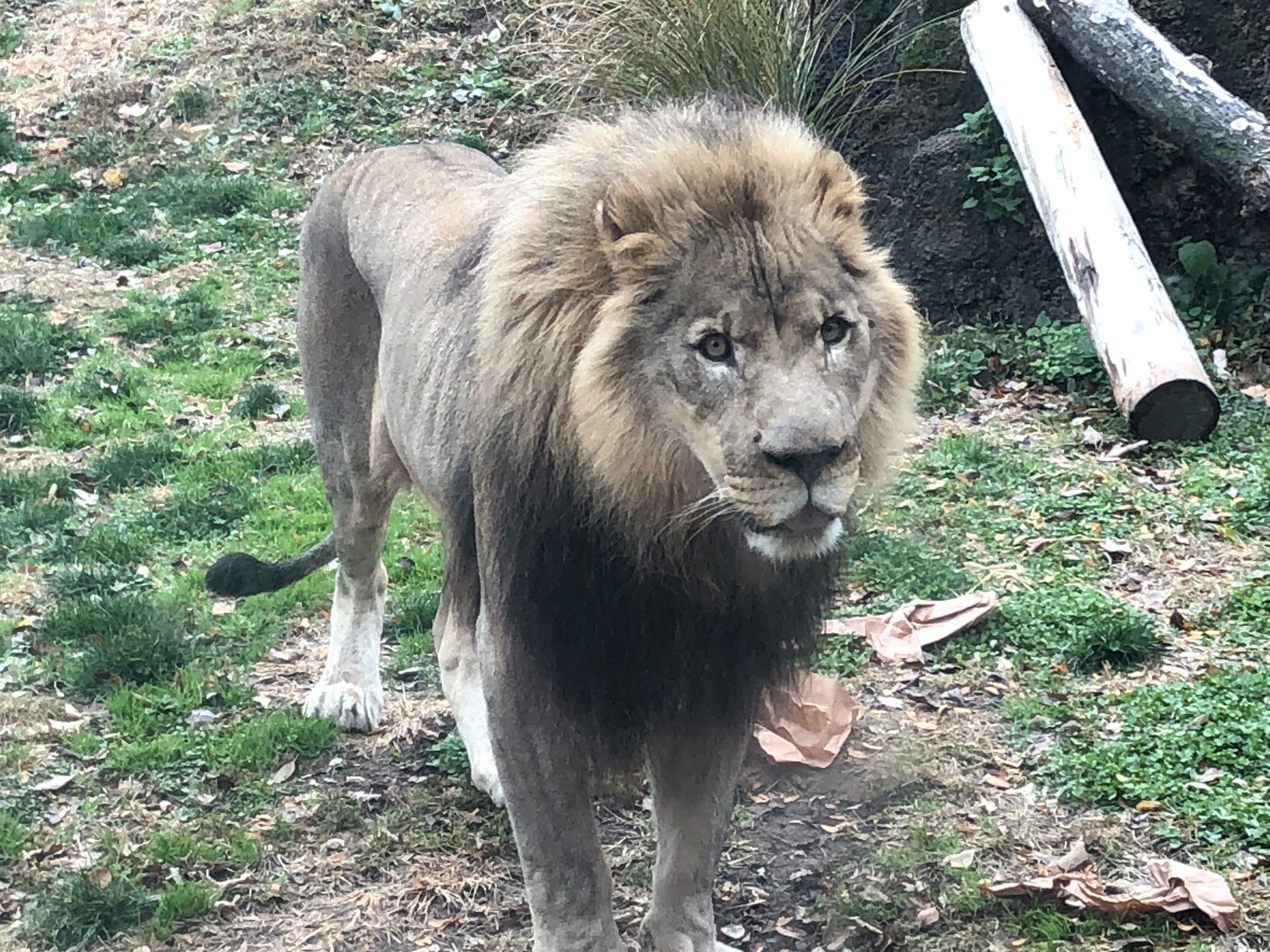
A African lion

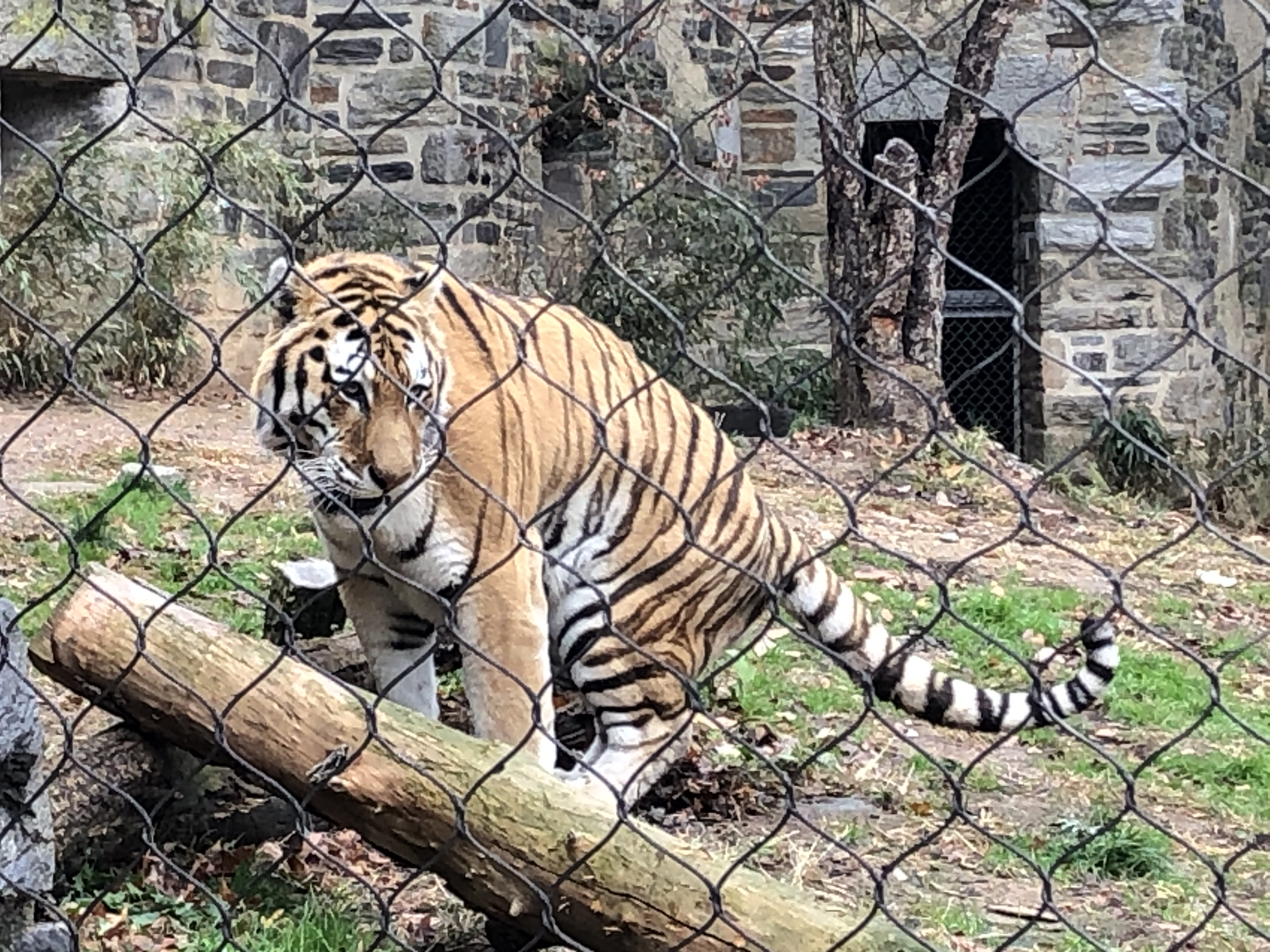
A Amur tiger

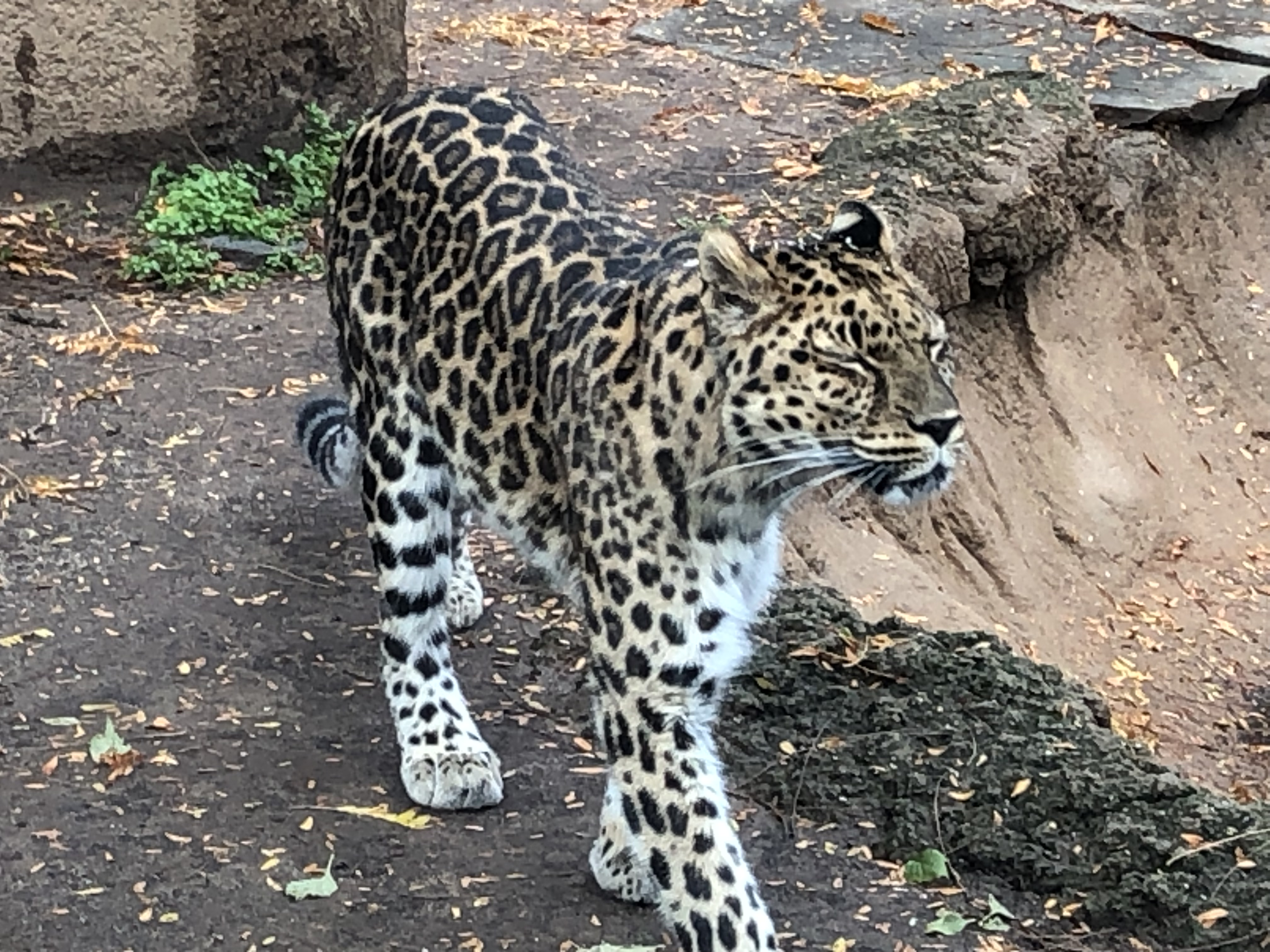
A Amur leopard

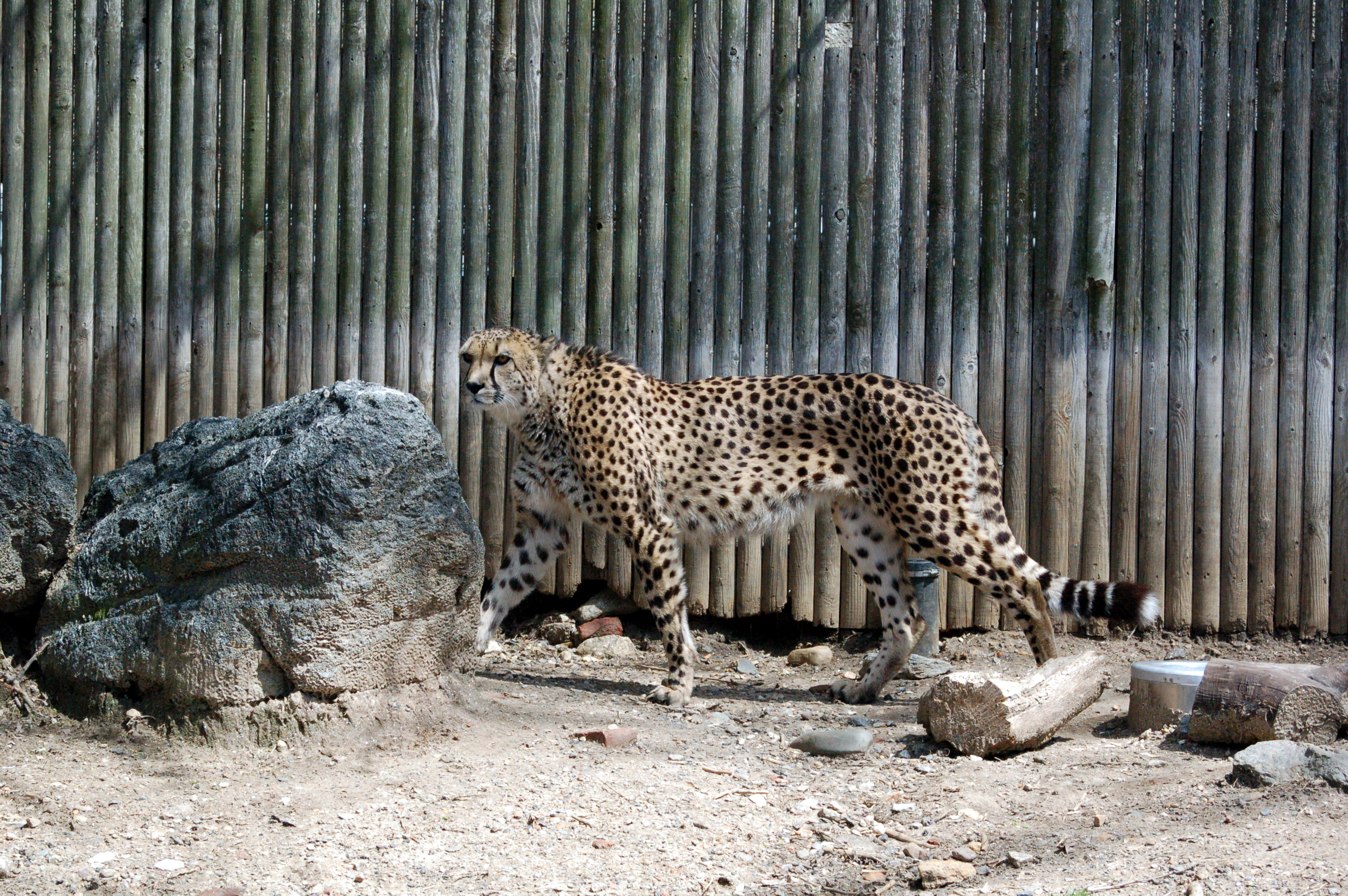
A cheetah

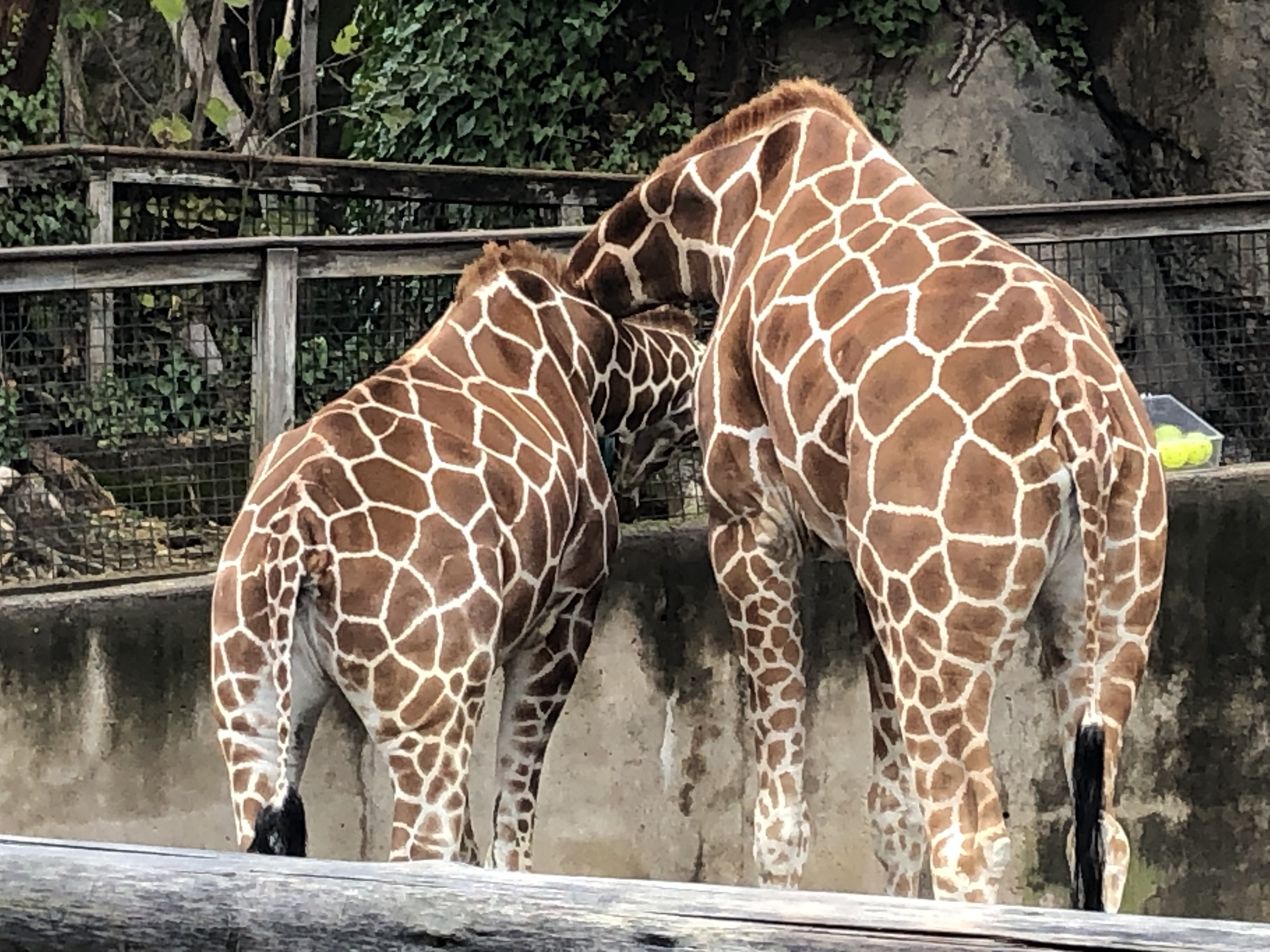
A pair of two reticulated giraffes

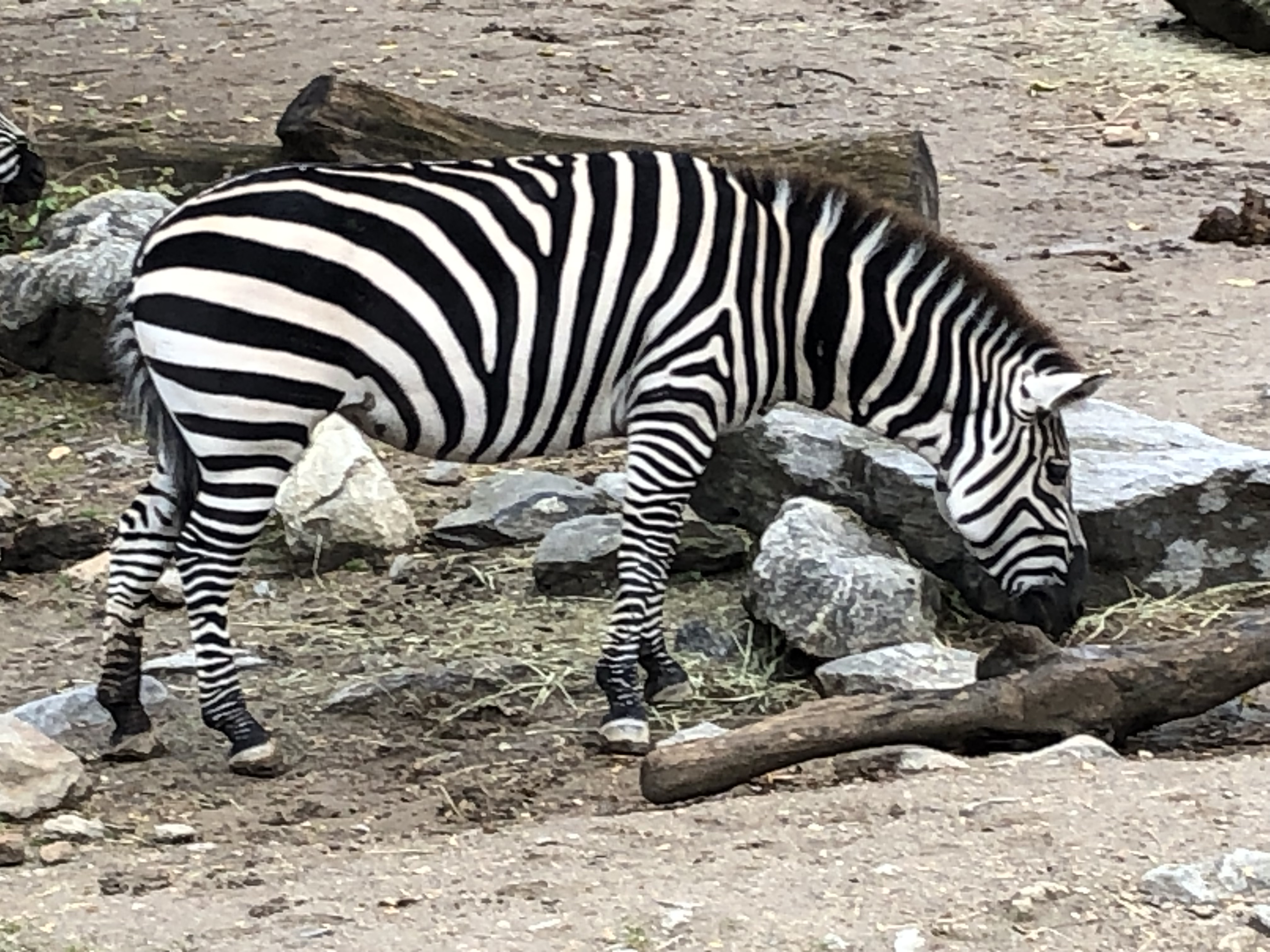
A Grant's zebra

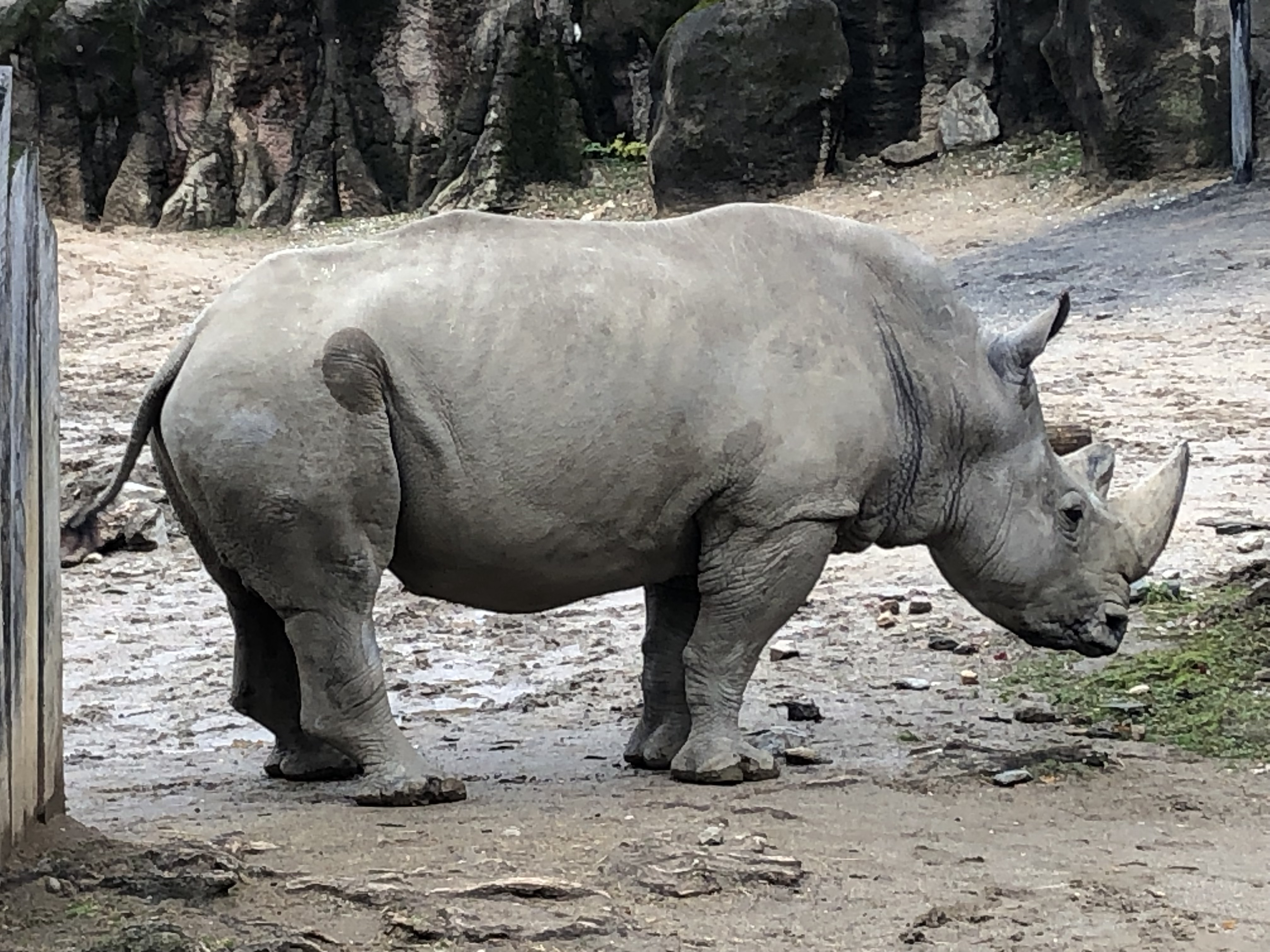
A Southern white rhinoceros

== See also ==
- Association of Zoos and Aquariums
- Fairmount Park
- Zoo Junction
