= The Solitude Mansion =

Historic house in Pennsylvania, United States

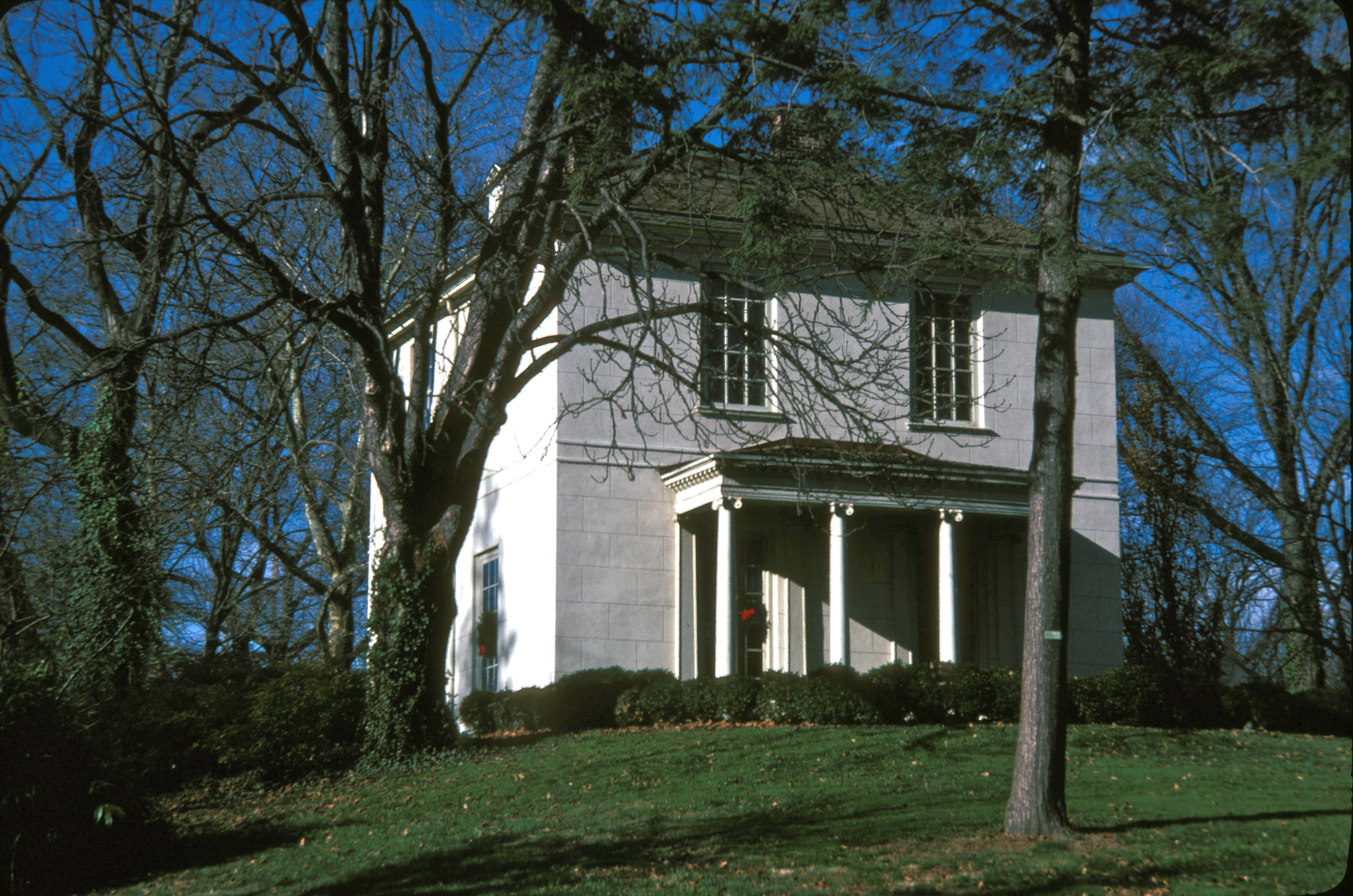

- Location within Philadelphia Location within Pennsylvania Location within the United States
- 39°58′21″N 75°11′44″W
- Location: 3400 West Girard Avenue, Philadelphia

History
- Built: 1784–85

Site notes
- Architect: John Penn
- Architectural style: Federal
- Governing body: Philadelphia Parks & Recreation, Philadelphia Zoo
- Owner: City of Philadelphia

Philadelphia Register of Historic Places
- Official name: The Solitude
- Designated: June 26, 1956

U.S. National Register of Historic Places
- Designated: February 7, 1972
- Reference no.: 72001151

The Solitude Mansion is a historic, American, two-and-a-half story Federal-style mansion located in west Fairmount Park, Philadelphia, Pennsylvania. It is situated above the banks of the Schuylkill River on the grounds of the Philadelphia Zoo.

== History and notable features ==
This house was built sometime between 1784 and 1785, and historical records suggest that it was designed by its owner John Penn, grandson of William Penn, the founder of the city of Philadelphia and the state of Pennsylvania. The mansion is also referred to as The Solitude and The Solitude House, as well as the John Penn House and simply Solitude without the definite article. The name of the house was inspired by the Duke of Württemberg's much larger Castle Solitude outside Stuttgart, Germany. The Solitude is the only extant home of a Penn family member in the United States.

Located in the countryside several miles to the northwest of colonial-era Philadelphia, Penn's house served as his refuge from an older cousin's city home, where he had been lodging, as well as from an anti-Penn political faction in town. Penn lived in his new home for about three years until he left the country permanently in 1788 and sailed to England. Joseph Bonaparte lived here as a retreat from his home in Society Hill, and after Penn died in 1834, the house was inherited in succession by three other family members—Penn's brother and then two nephews separately.

At some time after the final Penn owner died in 1869, the city bought the property and leased it to the Zoological Society of Philadelphia in 1874. The land and house then became part of the Philadelphia Zoo, which in turn is a part of Fairmount Park. The house is not open to general admission visitors, but rather only for special events. Rental information is available from the zoo.

The zoo's staff along with the Philadelphia Museum of Art performed restoration work on the house in 1975–76 to prepare it for the Bicentennial celebration. A preservation group called Friends of The Solitude was formed in 1991 which has researched the house's history and continues to perform additional restoration work.

The Solitude is registered on the Philadelphia Register of Historic Places and is an inventoried structure within the Fairmount Park Historic District entry on the National Register of Historic Places.

== See also ==
- List of houses in Fairmount Park
- National Register of Historic Places listings in West Philadelphia – an inventoried structure within the Fairmount Park listing
