= Heichal HaTarbut =

Concert hall in Tel Aviv, Israel

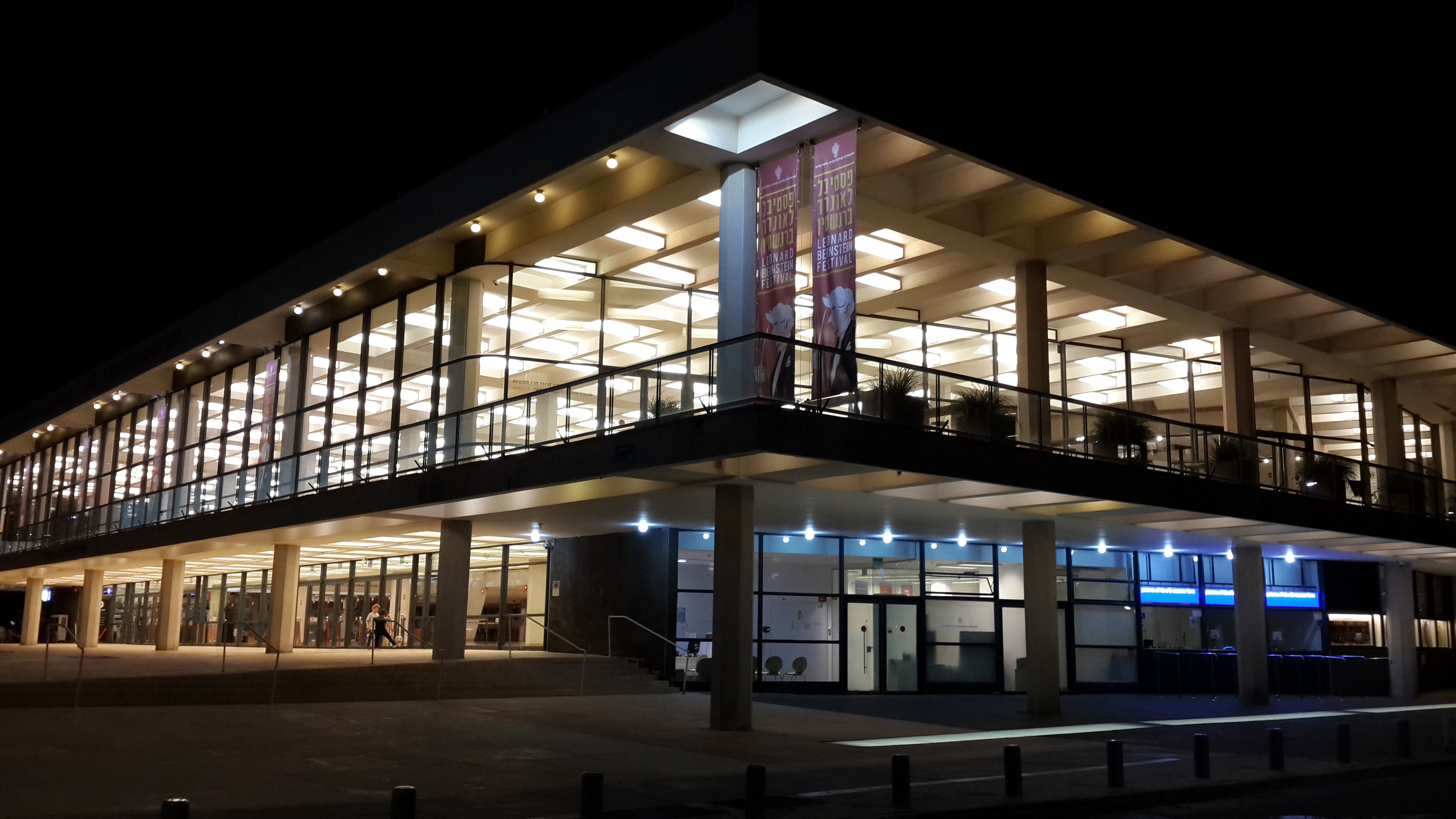
- Interactive map of Heichal HaTarbut
- Former names: Fredric R. Mann Auditorium
- Location: 2 Huberman Street; Tel Aviv, Israel.
- Coordinates: 32.073643°N 34.779974°E
- Seating type: Reserved
- Capacity: 2,412
- Type: Concert hall

Construction
- Opened: 1957
- Renovated: 2011–13
- Architects: Dov Karmi, Zeev Rechter and Yaakov Rechter

Tenant
- Israel Philharmonic Orchestra

Heichal HaTarbut (Hebrew: היכל התרבות, lit. 'the hall of culture'), officially known as the Charles Bronfman Auditorium and until 2013 as the Fredric R. Mann Auditorium, is the largest concert hall in Tel Aviv, Israel, and home to the Israel Philharmonic Orchestra.

== History ==
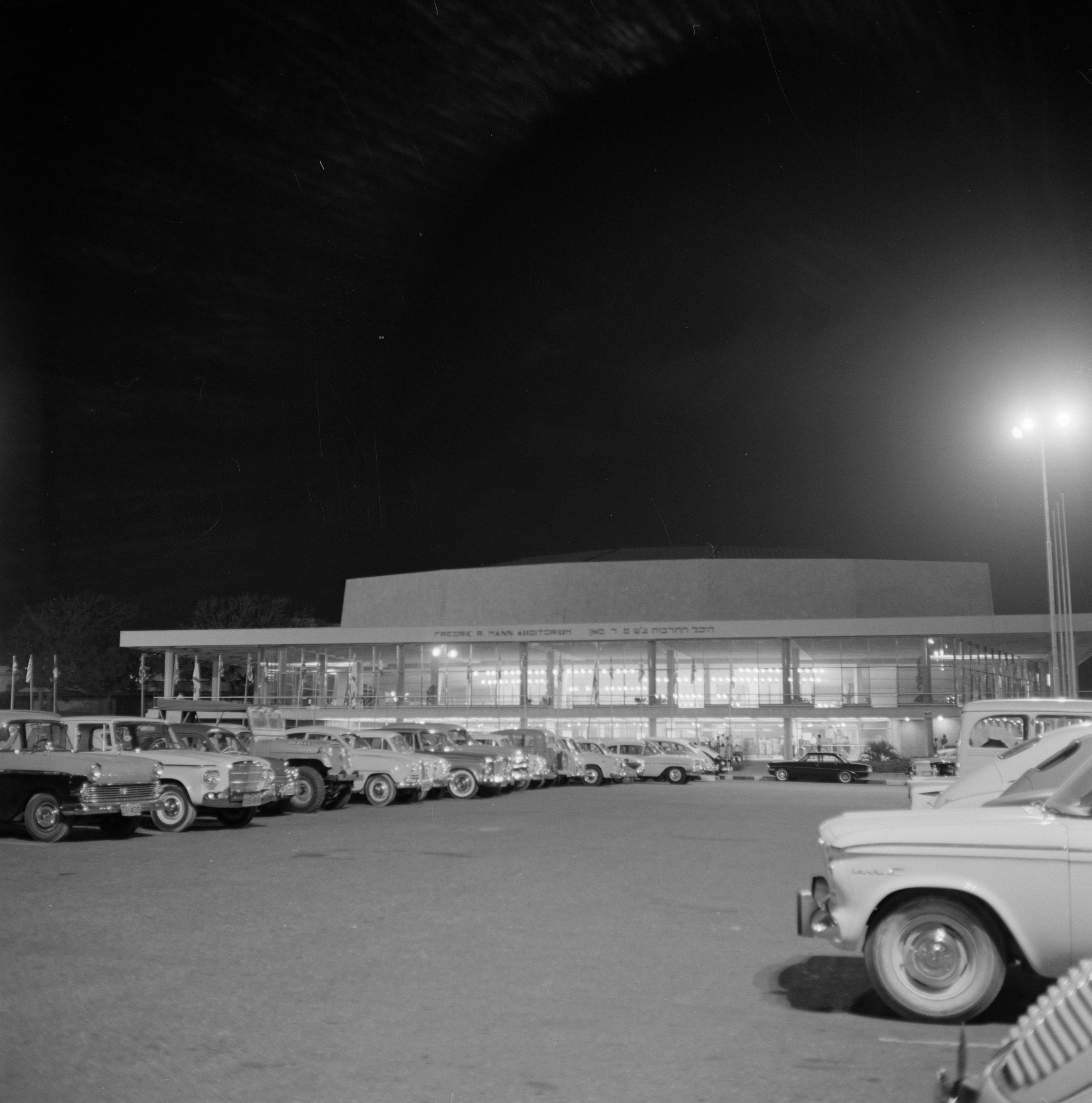
Mann Auditorium, 1964

Heichal HaTarbut, originally named the Fredric R. Mann Auditorium, opened in October 1957 at Habima Square. The building was designed by Dov Karmi, Ze'ev Rechter and Yaakov Rechter. Leonard Bernstein conducted the inaugural concert, with the Israel Philharmonic and pianist Arthur Rubinstein as a soloist.

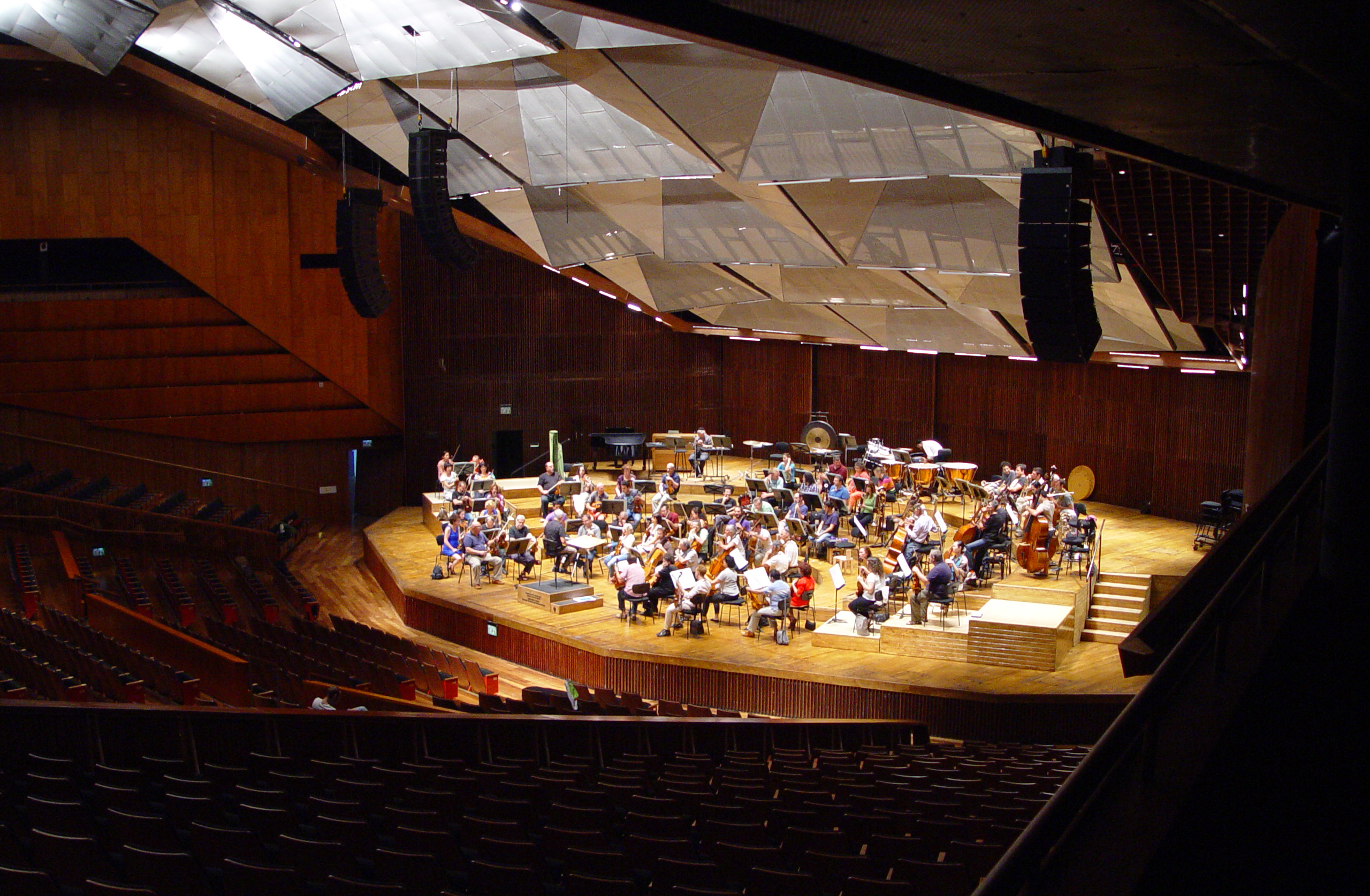
The concert hall after renovation

Until 2013, the hall was officially known as the Fredric R. Mann Auditorium, bearing the name of its donor. Renovations under the supervision of Israeli architect Ofer Kolker were undertaken from 2011 to 2013. The new acoustics were designed by Japanese Yasuhisa Toyota.

Heichal HaTarbut reopened in May 2013 with a performance of Gustav Mahler's 5th Symphony by the Israel Philharmonic Orchestra under its music director Zubin Mehta.

In 2013, the renovated venue was reopened as Charles Bronfman Auditorium, after Canadian-American businessman and donor Charles Bronfman.
