= Centennial District (Philadelphia) =

- Neighborhood of Philadelphia
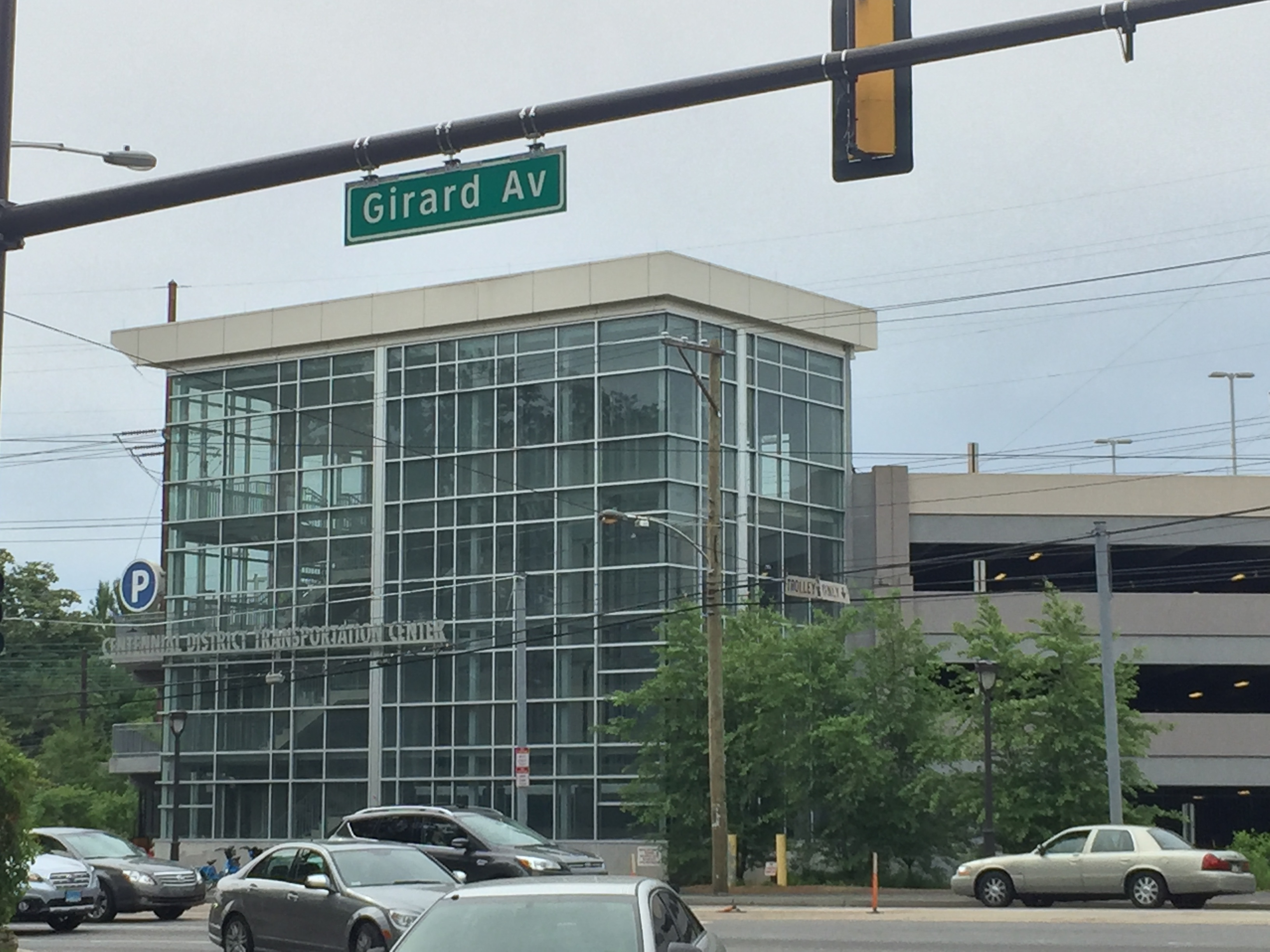
- Girard Avenue at the Centennial District

- Location within Philadelphia
- Country: United States
- State: Pennsylvania
- County: Philadelphia
- City: Philadelphia
- ZIP Code: 19146
- Area codes: 215, 267 and 445

The Centennial District is a 700-acre section of West Philadelphia, Pennsylvania, United States that contains the Philadelphia Zoo, the Please Touch Museum and the Mann Music Center. The neighborhood sits on a section of town that was the location of the 1876 Centennial Exposition, which was 100 years after the founding of the United States with the signing of the Declaration of Independence.

The area is part of a plan to incorporate parts of present-day Fairmount Park to revitalize neighborhoods in the area for the year 2026.

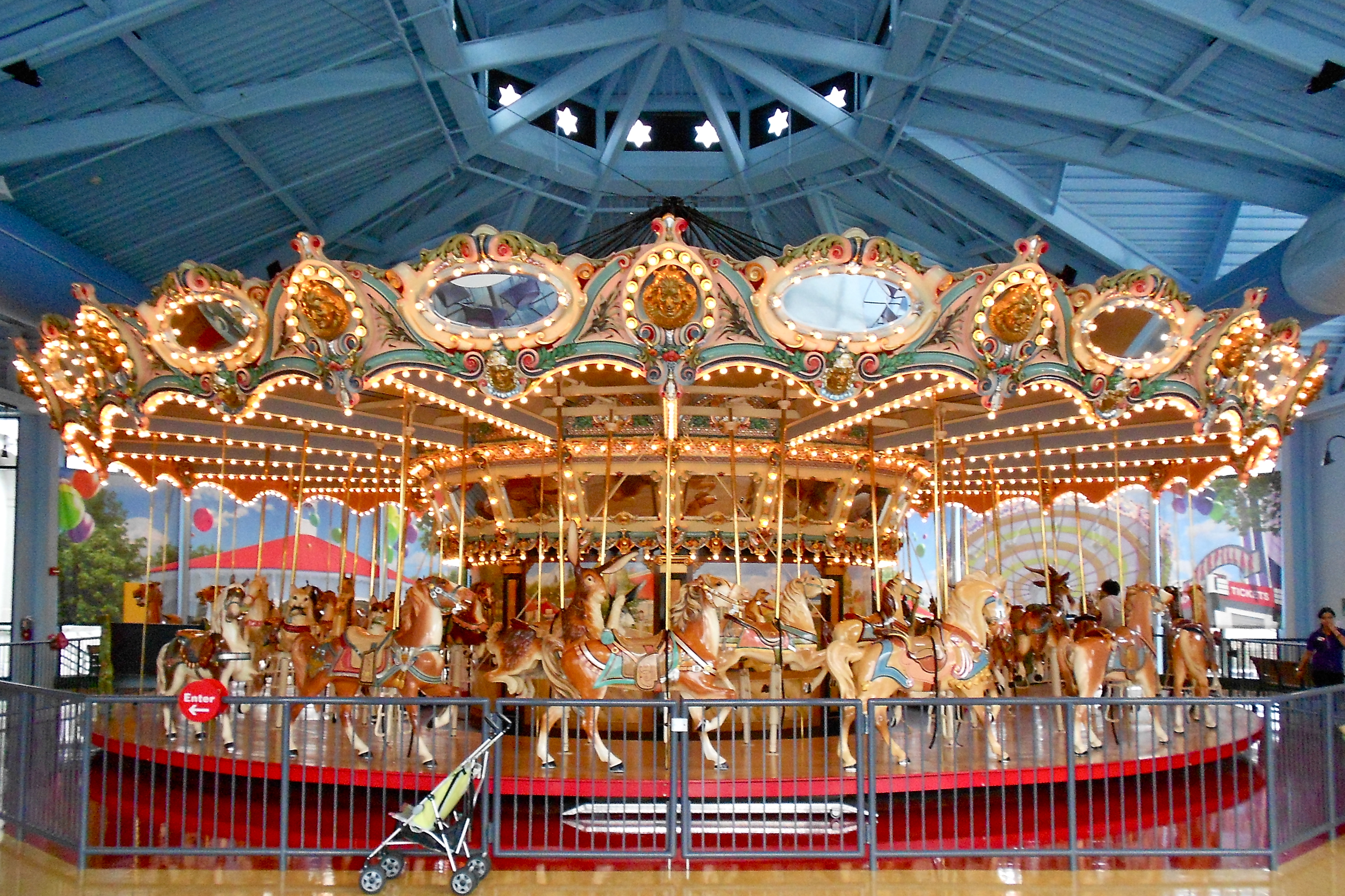
Carousel in the Please Touch Museum

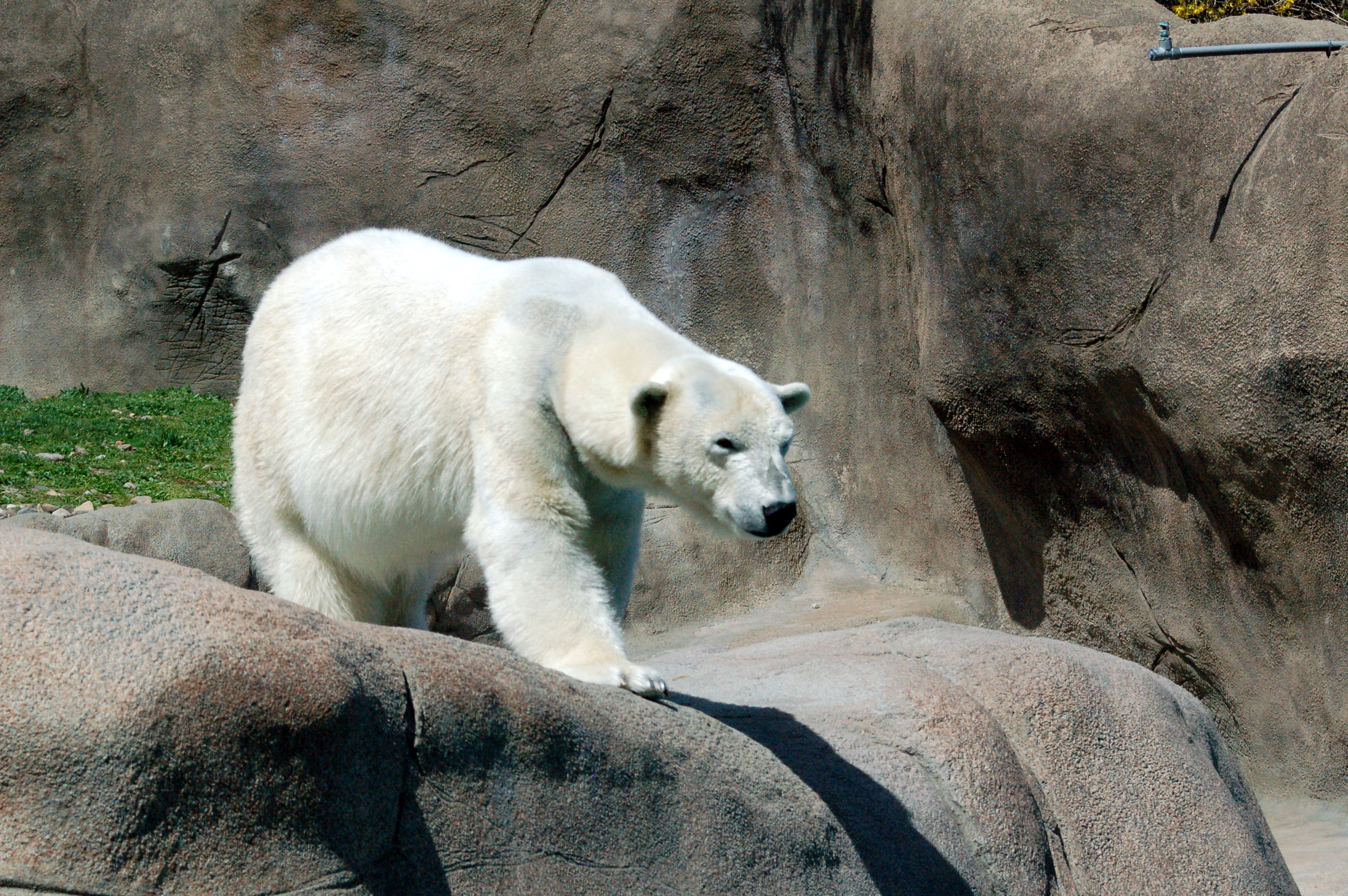
Polar Bear at the Philadelphia Zoo

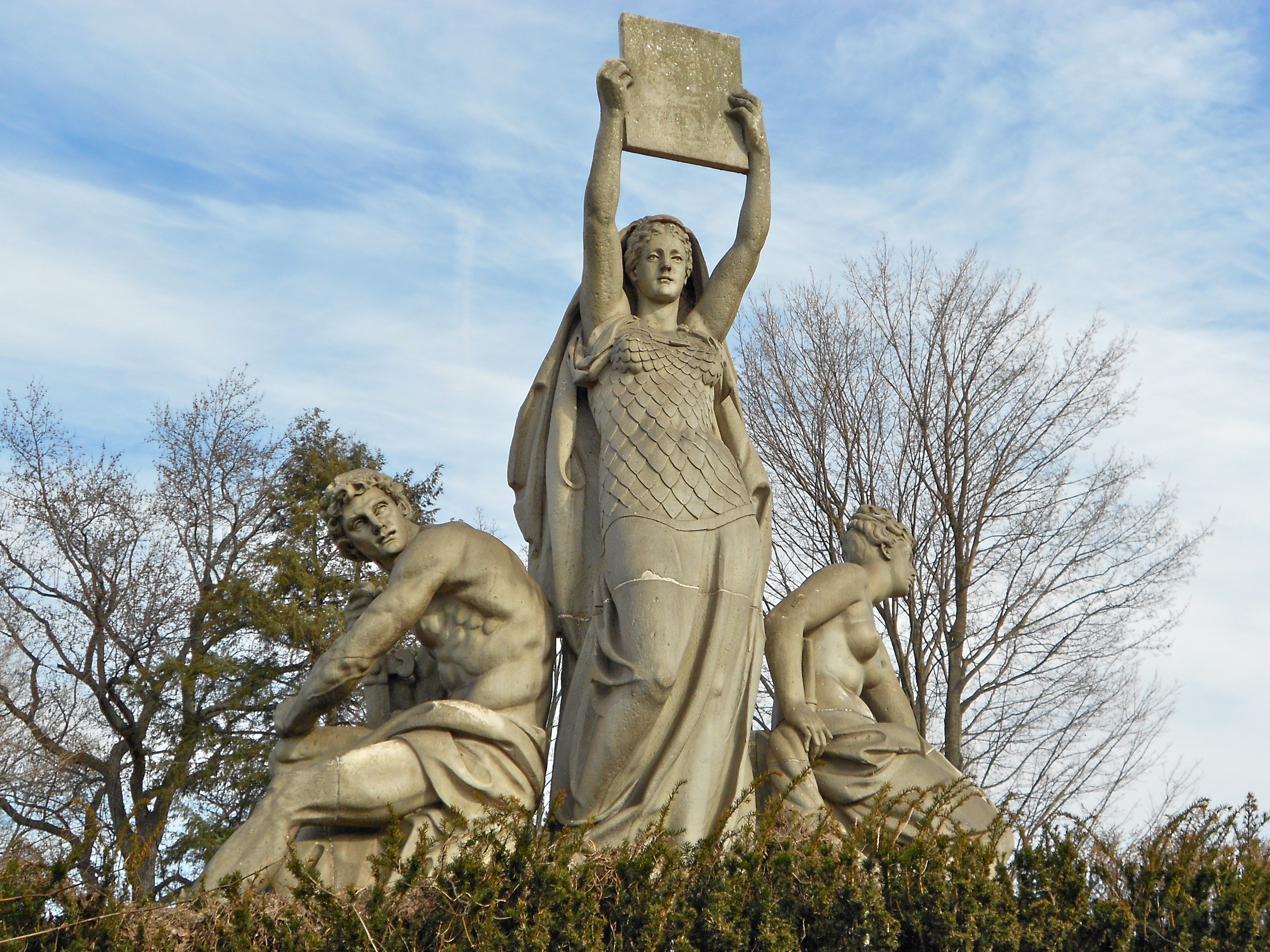
Law, Prosperity and Power by Daniel Chester French near the Mann Center

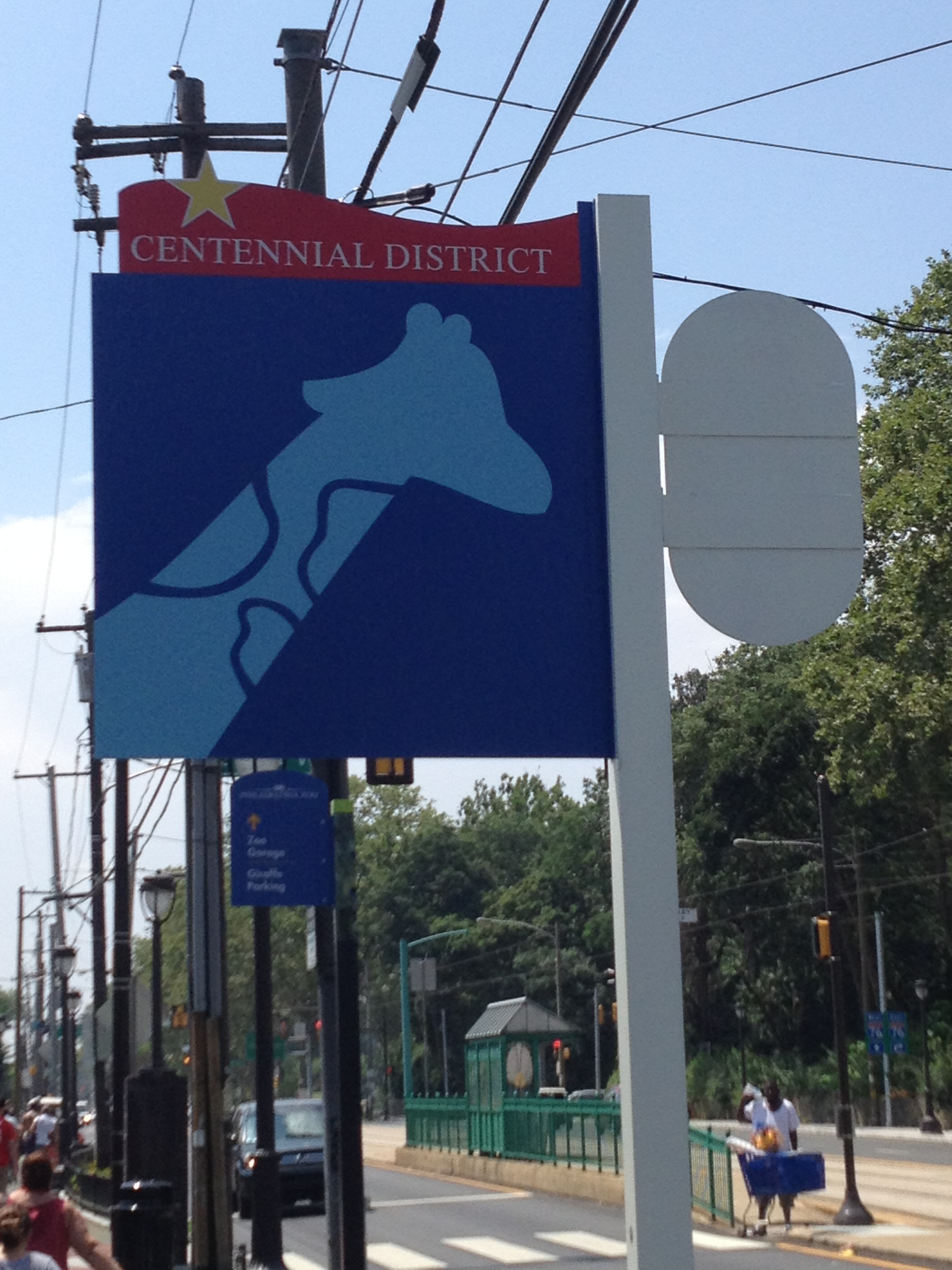
Centennial District signage

== Transportation ==
Streetcar service along Girard Avenue is provided by SEPTA's Route 15 trolley.

== See also ==
- Parkside Historic District (Philadelphia, Pennsylvania)
- Ohio House (Philadelphia)
