= Highmark Mann =

Nonprofit performing arts center in Philadelphia, Pennsylvania

Coordinates: 39°58′59″N 75°13′22″W

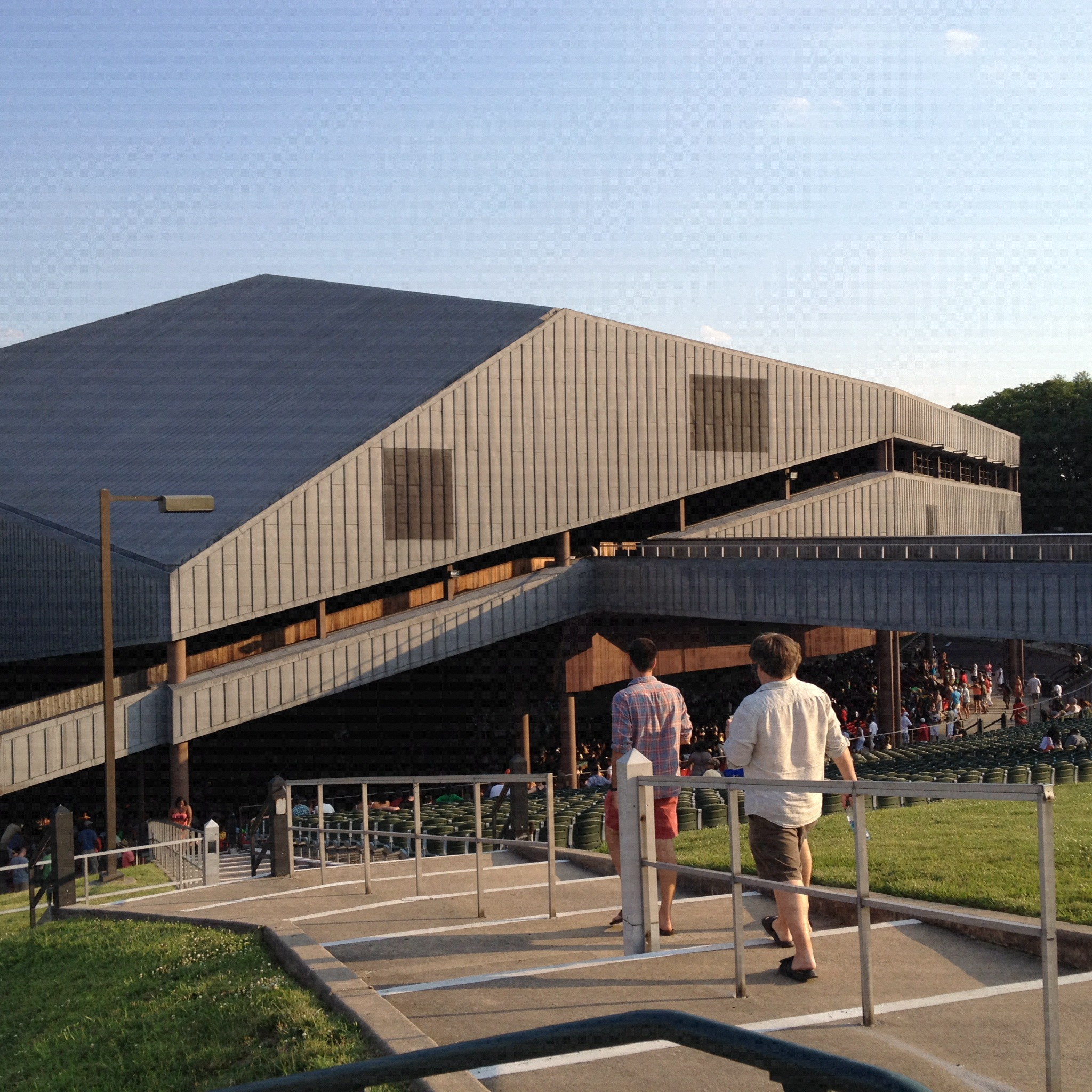
- Full name: Highmark Mann Center for The Performing Arts
- Former names: Robin Hood Dell West (1976–79); Mann Music Center (1979–2000); Mann Center for the Performing Arts (2000–25)
- Address: 5201 Parkside Ave; Philadelphia, PA 19131
- Location: Fairmount Park
- Owner: City of Philadelphia
- Capacity: Detailed venue capacity: TD Pavilion: 13,000; Skyline Stage: 3,000-7,500

Construction
- Groundbreaking: February 1975
- Opened: June 14, 1976; 50 years ago

Website
- Venue Website

The Highmark Mann (formerly known as the Robin Hood Dell West, the Mann Music Center or The Mann Center for the Performing Arts) is a nonprofit performing arts center located in the Centennial District of Philadelphia's West Fairmount Park, built in 1976 as the summer home for the Philadelphia Orchestra. It is the successor in this role to the Robin Hood Dell outdoor amphitheater, where the Philadelphia Orchestra had given summer performances since 1930. Highmark Mann's campus includes an amphitheater, TD Pavilion at Highmark Mann, and a smaller open-air stage, the Skyline Stage at Highmark Mann.

The Mann has hosted artists and touring companies including the American Ballet Theatre with Mikhail Baryshnikov, Marian Anderson, Leonard Bernstein, Buena Vista Social Club, Ray Charles, Judy Garland, the Metropolitan Opera, Mormon Tabernacle Choir, Paul Robeson, Itzhak Perlman, Lang Lang, Midori, and Yo-Yo Ma. Major Philadelphia premieres have included the Israel Philharmonic Orchestra, Bolshoi Ballet and Orchestra's production of Spartacus, and Britain's Royal Ballet’s productions of Romeo and Juliet and Swan Lake.

Artists performing there include Celine Dion, Phish, Jack Johnson, Ed Sheeran, Tony Bennett, Mary J. Blige, Roger Daltrey, Bob Dylan, Furthur, Kesha, Lake Street Dive, Tame Impala, Arcade Fire, Aretha Franklin, Whitney Houston, Pat Metheney, The Jerry Garcia Band, Santana, Herbie Hancock, Norah Jones, Diana Krall, Wynton Marsalis, Willie Nelson, Smokey Robinson, Jill Scott, James Taylor, Damien Rice, Blondie with Garbage, Sugarland and Stevie Ray Vaughan.

In 2010, 2011, and 2014, the Mann was nominated by Pollstar as "Best Major Outdoor Concert Venue" in North America. The Mann has a total seating capacity of approximately 14,000, with 4,743 seats under the roof and over 8,600 outside. The Skyline Stage has a capacity of 6,500.

== History ==
The Mann first opened in 1976 as Robin Hood Dell West and subsequently was designated in 1979 the Mann Music Center in honor of Fredric R. Mann. In 2000, the facility was renamed to The Mann Center for the Performing Arts to reflect the center's plans to broaden its programming and service to the overall community. In 2025, signed a 12-year naming rights sponsorship deal with Pittsburgh-based insurance company, Highmark, renaming the facility as Highmark Mann Center for the Performing Arts.

== Education and community engagement ==
Highmark Mann Center for the Performing Arts' Education & Community Engagement program is the region's largest free education program, serving over 50,000 young people annually. Highmark Mann's annual Young People's Concert Series features free main stage performances making performing arts programs accessible to children in the Philadelphia region. The Connecting Arts-N-Schools series brings guest artists directly into 22 partner schools, and the Judith Gitlin ArtsTeach @ The Mann programs include 6 individual series: Meet the Artist, Tiny Tots Fascination Series, Greenfield Performance Treasures, Connecting Arts @ The center, Artist in Residency and Master Class.

== See also ==
- List of contemporary amphitheatres
