= List of Pennsylvania state historical markers in Philadelphia County =

Location of Philadelphia in Pennsylvania

This is intended to be a complete list of the Pennsylvania state historical markers in Philadelphia County, as placed by the Pennsylvania Historical and Museum Commission (PHMC) in the U.S. state of Pennsylvania.

As of 2021, there were 321 combined Roadside (larger) and City (narrower) markers affixed on posts and Plaque markers affixed to buildings or structures in Philadelphia County, Pennsylvania, which is coterminous with the city of Philadelphia. Of these, 12 are listed as Missing. Latitude and longitude coordinates are given as provided by the PHMC's database.

== Historical markers ==
Marker title	Image	Date dedicated	Location	Marker type	Topics	Neighborhood	Notes & Signs
A.M.E. Book Concern	A.M.E. Book Concern	June 1, 1991	631 Pine St., Philadelphia; 39.94402°N 75.1531°W	City	African American, Religion	Society Hill	
Academy of Natural Sciences	Academy of Natural Sciences	May 15, 2013	302 Market St., Philadelphia; 39.95021°N 75.14581°W	City	Education, Science and Medicine	Old City	
African American Baseball in Philadelphia	African American Baseball in Philadelphia	April 25, 1998	SW corner, Belmont and Parkside Aves., Philadelphia; 39.97762°N 75.21356°W	Roadside	African American, Baseball, Sports and Recreation	Fairmount Park (Parkside)	
African Zoar Methodist Episcopal Church	African Zoar Methodist Episcopal Church historical marker	June 2, 1990	401 Brown St. (at N 4th), Philadelphia; 39.96383°N 75.14465°W	City	African American, Religion, Underground Railroad	North Philadelphia East (Northern Liberties)	
Alain Leroy Locke (1886-1954)	Alain Leroy Locke (1886-1954)	1991	701 Arch St, Philadelphia; 39.95327°N 75.15157°W	City	African American, Education, Professions and Vocations, Writers	Independence Mall (Independence Mall)	
Albert M. Greenfield (1887-1967)	Albert M. Greenfield (1887-1967)	April 21, 2016	1315 Walnut St., Philadelphia; 39.94931°N 75.16294°W	City	African American, Business and Industry, Government and Politics 20th Century, Religion	Washington Square West	
Alfred J. Reach (1840-1928)	Alfred J. Reach (1840-1928)	April 4, 2003	1820 Chestnut St., Philadelphia; 39.95172°N 75.17137°W	City	Baseball, Sports and Recreation	Rittenhouse Square	
America's First Lager	America's First Lager	2001	905 N American St., Philadelphia; 39.96458°N 75.14191°W	City	Business and Industry	North Philadelphia East (Northern Liberties)	
American Bandstand	American Bandstand	August 5, 1997	4601 Market St., Philadelphia; 39.9585°N 75.21259°W	Roadside	Business and Industry, Motion Pictures and Television	West Philadelphia (Walnut Hill)	
American Friends Service Committee	American Friends Service Committee	November 6, 1999	1501 Cherry St., at Friends Ctr., Philadelphia; 39.95559°N 75.16477°W	City	Religion	Logan Square (Hahnemann)	
American Pharmaceutical Association	American Pharmaceutical Association Historical Marker at N. 7th and Market sts. Philadelphia	September 24, 2001	NW corner, Market and N 7th sts., Philadelphia; 39.95115°N 75.15162°W	City	Science and Medicine, Professions and Vocations Independence Mall		
Anna Thomas Jeanes (1822-1907)		September 12, 2019	Entrance to Jeanes Hospital, 7600 Central Ave., Philadelphia; 40.0691°N 75.0867°W	Roadside	Education, Science and Medicine, Women	Northeast Philadelphia (Fox Chase)	
Anne Brancato Wood (1903-1972)	Anne Brancato Wood (1903-1972)	June 17, 1994	SW corner, Broad & Chestnut Sts., Philadelphia; 39.95165°N 75.16461°W	City	Ethnic & Immigration, Government & Politics, Government & Politics 20th Century, Women	Market East (City Hall)	
Anthony Benezet (1713-1784)	Anthony Benezet (1713-1784)	June 4, 2016	325 Chestnut St., Philadelphia; 39.94904°N 75.14721°W	City	African American, Education, Religion, Women, Writers	Independence Mall	
Anthony J. Drexel (1826-1893)	Anthony J. Drexel (1826-1893)	April 2005	48 S Third Street, Philadelphia; 39.94899°N 75.14581°W	City	Business & Industry, Education, Entrepreneurs, Railroads	Independence Mall	
Anthony Palmer (1664-1749)		October 17, 2015	at Palmer Cemetery, just inside main gate on Palmer St., between Belgrade & Memphis Sts., Philadelphia; 39.97425°N 75.13013°W	Roadside	Early Settlement, Government & Politics 18th Century, Governors, Native American, Professions & Vocations	North Philadelphia East (Fishtown)	
Arch Street Meeting House	Arch Street Meeting House	December 17, 1954	Arch Street, between 3rd & 4th Sts., Philadelphia; 39.95237°N 75.14577°W	City	Buildings and Architecture, Religion, William Penn	Old City	
Arthur Lee Hall (1934-2000)		June 11, 2011	2544 N Germantown Ave., Philadelphia; 39.9909°N 75.14826°W	City	African American, Music & Theater, Performers	Upper North Philadelphia (Glenwood)	
Baker Bowl National League Park	Baker Bowl National League Park	August 16, 2000	N. Broad Street (between Lehigh & Huntingdon), Philadelphia; 39.99245°N 75.15488°W	City	African American, Baseball, Sports & Recreation	Upper North Philadelphia (Glenwood)	
Baldwin Locomotive Works	Baldwin Locomotive Works	September 26, 2009	Matthias Baldwin Park, NW corner, N 19th & Hamilton Sts., Philadelphia; 39.96193°N 75.16952°W	Roadside	Business & Industry, Railroads	Logan Square	
Barbara Gittings (1932-2007)		July 26, 2016	21st & Locust Sts., Philadelphia; 39.94956°N 75.17609°W	City	Civil Rights, Education, Science & Medicine, Publishing & Journalism	Rittenhouse Square	
Barrymores, The	Barrymores, The	October 1, 1996	NW corner, N 6th & Arch sts., Philadelphia; 39.95279°N 75.15013°W	City	Performers	Independence Mall	
Baruch S. Blumberg (1925-2001)	Baruch S. Blumberg (1925-2001)	September 24, 2016	323 S Lawrence Ct., Philadelphia; 39.94447°N 75.14932°W	City	Science & Medicine, Professions & Vocations	Society Hill	
Battle of Germantown	Battle of Germantown	October 5, 1996	6401 Germantown Ave. at Clivedon, Germantown, Philadelphia; 40.04644°N 75.18242°W	City	American Revolution, George Washington, Military	Northwest Philadelphia (Mount Airy)	
Benjamin Banneker Institute	Benjamin Banneker Institute	1991	409 S. 11th St., near Waverly, Philadelphia; 39.94453°N 75.15989°W	City	African American, Education	Washington Square West	
Benjamin Franklin (1706-1790)	Benjamin Franklin (1706-1790)	June 30, 1990	Chestnut St. between 3rd & 4th Sts., at Nat'l. Liberty Mus., Philadelphia; 39.94881°N 75.14683°W	City	Government & Politics, Government & Politics 18th Century, Invention, Science & Medicine, Professions & Vocations, Publishing & Journalism, Writers	Independence Mall	
Benjamin Rush (1745-1813)	Benjamin Rush (1745-1813)	June 20, 2002	Keswick & Rayland Roads, Philadelphia; 40.07738°N 74.98563°W	City	American Revolution, Education, Government & Politics, Government & Politics 18th Century, Science & Medicine, Professions & Vocations	Northeast Philadelphia (Millbrook)	
Benjamin Smith Barton (1766-1815)	Benjamin Smith Barton (1766-1815)	December 19, 2004	712 Arch Street, Philadelphia (subsequent research has found 726 Arch to be the actual site of Barton's home.); 39.95398°N 75.1504°W	City	Education, Exploration, Science & Medicine, Writers	Independence Mall	
Berean Institute	Berean Institute	October 17, 1990	1901 W. Girard Ave., Philadelphia; 39.97258°N 75.16755°W	City	African American, Education, Religion	North Philadelphia West (Cecil B. Moore)	
Bethel Burying Ground	Bethel Burying Ground	October 1, 2019	Weccacoe Playground, 426 Queen St., at S Lawrence St., Philadelphia; 39.93778°N 75.15105°W	City	African American, Religion	Queen Village	
Betsy Ross (1752-1836)	Betsy Ross (1752-1836)	April 27, 2009	239 Arch St., Philadelphia; 39.95226°N 75.14473°W	City	American Revolution, Professions & Vocations, Women	Old City	
Billie Holiday (1915-1959)	Billie Holiday (1915-1959)	1993	1409 Lombard St., Philadelphia; 39.94485°N 75.16576°W	City	African American, Music & Theater, Performers, Women	Rittenhouse Square	
Booth Maternity Center		April 21, 2017	St. Joseph's Univ. - Moore Hall, 6051 Overbrook Dr., Philadelphia; 39.99104°N 75.2478°W	Roadside	Science & Medicine, Professions & Vocations, Women	West Philadelphia (Overbrook Park)	
Broad Street Station	Broad Street Station	May 18, 1999	NW corner, N 15th & Market streets 39.95295°N 75.16521°W	City	Buildings and Architecture, Railroads, Transportation	Market East (City Hall)	
Byberry Hall		July 19, 2014	3003 Byberry Rd., Philadelphia; 40.10173°N 74.98084°W	Roadside	African American, Government and Politics 19th Century, Underground Railroad	Northeast Philadelphia (Parkwood)	
C. DeLores Tucker (1927-2005)	C. DeLores Tucker (1927-2005)	July 22, 2006	6700 Lincoln Dr., Phila. 40.04652°N 75.19257°W	Roadside	African American, Civil Rights, Government & Politics 20th Century, Women	Northwest Philadelphia (Mount Airy)	
Captain Thomas Holme (1624-1695)	Captain Thomas Holme (1624-1695)	November 1924	113 Arch St., Philadelphia; 39.951896°N 75.142235°W	Plaque	Government & Politics 17th Century, William Penn	Old City	Missing
Caspar Wistar (1761-1818)	Caspar Wistar (1761-1818)	December 5, 2000	240 S 4th Street, Philadelphia; 39.94586°N 75.14802°W	City	Education, Exploration, Science & Medicine, Professions & Vocations	Society Hill	
Central Library	Central Library	June 2, 2002	1901 Vine Street, Philadelphia; 39.95938°N 75.17105°W	City	Buildings & Architecture, Education	Logan Square	
Charles Willson Peale	Charles Willson Peale	1999	SW corner of 3rd & Lombard Sts., Philadelphia; 39.94237°N 75.1474°W	City	Artists, George Washington	Society Hill	Missing
Children's Hospital of Philadelphia, The	Children's Hospital of Philadelphia, The	September 24, 2002	S 34th St. & Civic Center Blvd., Philadelphia; 39.94883°N 75.19298°W	City	Buildings & Architecture, Invention, Science & Medicine, Professions & Vocations	University City	
Christ Church	Christ Church	December 17, 1954	N 2nd St., between Market & Arch Sts., Philadelphia; 39.95093°N 75.14354°W	City	Government & Politics 18th Century, Religion	Old City	
Christian Street Hospital	Christian Street Hospital	September 9, 2005	924 Christian St., Philadelphia; 39.93902°N 75.15845°W	City	Civil War, Invention, Science & Medicine	Bella Vista	
Christian Street YMCA	Christian Street YMCA	1991	1724 Christian St., Philadelphia; 39.94089°N 75.17195°W	City	African American, Education, Sports & Recreation	Graduate Hospital	
Christopher Saur (1693-1758)	Christopher Saur (1693-1758)	April 19, 2009	at Trinity Lutheran Church, 5300 Germantown Ave., Phila. 40.03211°N 75.16885°W	City	Ethnic & Immigration, Professions & Vocations, Publishing & Journalism, Religion	Northwest Philadelphia (Germantown)	
Church of the Advocate	Church of the Advocate	July 29, 1999	N 18th & Diamond Sts., Philadelphia; 39.98565°N 75.16312°W	City	African American, Buildings & Architecture, Government & Politics 20th Century, Religion, Women	North Philadelphia West (Cecil B. Moore)	
Citizens and Southern Bank		1991	NE corner, S 19th & South Sts., Philadelphia; 39.94469°N 75.17301°W	City	African American, Business & Industry	Rittenhouse Square	
Civilian Public Service	Civilian Public Service	October 26, 1996	Friends Center at 1501 Cherry St., Philadelphia; 39.95564°N 75.16514°W	Roadside	Agriculture, Business & Industry, Labor, Science & Medicine, Military, Military Post-Civil War, Religion	Logan Square (Hahnemann)	
Commercial Digital Computer Birthplace		September 28, 2006	3747 Ridge Ave., Philadelphia; 40.00211°N 75.18695°W	Roadside	Business & Industry, Invention	Upper North Philadelphia (Laurel Hill Cemetery)	
Commodore John Barry (1745-1803)	Commodore John Barry (1745-1803)	September 3, 2014	S Columbus Blvd. at Dock St. (near Hyatt and Indep. Seaport Mus.), Philadelphia; 39.94548°N 75.14204°W	Roadside	American Revolution, George Washington, Government & Politics 18th Century, Military, Professions & Vocations	Penn's Landing	
Common Sense	Common Sense	1993	SE corner of S 3rd St. & Thomas Paine Place (Chancellor St), Philadelphia; 39.94041°N 75.14645°W	City	American Revolution, Government & Politics, Government & Politics 18th Century, Military, Professions & Vocations, Publishing & Journalism	Queen Village	
Connie Mack (1862-1956)	Connie Mack (1862-1956)	May 30, 1998	604 W Cliveden St., Philadelphia; 40.03788°N 75.19197°W	Roadside	Baseball, Sports & Recreation	Northwest Philadelphia (Mount Airy)	
Crystal Bird Fauset		1991	5403 Vine St., Philadelphia; 39.96513°N 75.22794°W	City	African American, Civil Rights, Government & Politics, Women	West Philadelphia (Haddington)	
Cyrus Bustill (1732-1806)		1992	210 Arch St., Philadelphia; 39.95191°N 75.14384°W	City	African American, Education, Native American, Professions & Vocations	Old City	
David Bustill Bowser (1820-1900)	David Bustill Bowser (1820-1900)	1991	481 N 4th St., Philadelphia; 39.96011°N 75.14527°W	Roadside	African American, Artists	North Philadelphia East (Northern Liberties)	
David Salisbury Franks (c.1740-1793)	David Salisbury Franks Historical Marker at N 5th and Arch Sts. Philadelphia PA	October 13, 2004	SE corner, 5th & Arch Sts., Philadelphia; 39.95243°N 75.14844°W	City	American Revolution, Religion	Independence Mall	
Dewey's Sit-In	Dewey's Sit-in	October 1, 2018	SE corner of 17th & Latimer Sts., Philadelphia; 39.94912°N 75.16921°W	City	African American, Business & Industry, Civil Rights	Rittenhouse Square	
Dixie Hummingbirds, The	Dixie Hummingbirds, The	June 6, 2017	2435 N College Ave., Philadelphia; 39.97454°N 75.17682°W	Roadside	African American, Music & Theater, Performers, Religion	North Philadelphia West (Sharswood)	
Dr. A. S. W. Rosenbach (1876-1952)	Dr. A. S. W. Rosenbach (1876-1952)	April 2, 2008	2010 Delancey Place; 39.94746°N 75.17512°W	City	Education, Professions & Vocations	Rittenhouse Square	
Dr. Constantine Hering (1800-1880)		November 8, 2015	NW corner of 12th & Arch Sts., Philadelphia; 39.95404°N 75.15953°W	City	Education, Science & Medicine, Professions & Vocations	Chinatown	
Dr. Mary Davis Ridgway (1873-1927)		September 8, 2001	Wissahickon Ave., between Lincoln Dr. and Walnut Ln., Philadelphia; 40.03149°N 75.18869°W	Roadside	Civil Rights, Science & Medicine, Professions & Vocations, Women	Northwest Philadelphia (Germantown)	
Dr. Oscar James Cooper		October 2, 2021	1621 W Jefferson St, Philadelphia, Pennsylvania, 19121; 39.9765°N 75.1627°W	City	African American, Education, Science & Medicine	North Philadelphia West (Cecil B. Moore)	
Dunbar Theatre, The	Dunbar Theatre, The	1992	SW corner, S Broad St. at Lombard, Philadelphia; 39.94445°N 75.1655°W	City	African American, Buildings & Architecture, Music & Theater, Performers	Rittenhouse Square	
Eastern State Penitentiary	Eastern State Penitentiary	May 2, 1996	2200 Fairmount Ave., Philadelphia; 39.96732°N 75.17311°W	City	Education, Government & Politics, Government & Politics 19th Century	North Philadelphia West (Spring Garden)	
Ebenezer Don Carlos Bassett (1833-1908)	Ebenezer Don Carlos Bassett (1833-1908)	1993	2121 N 29th St., Philadelphia; 39.98827°N 75.18039°W	City	African American, Education	North Philadelphia West (Strawberry Mansion)	
Ebenezer Maxwell Mansion	Ebenezer Maxwell Mansion	September 27, 2008	200 W Tulpehocken St. (Germantown), Philadelphia; 40.03851°N 75.18367°W	City	Buildings & Architecture, Cities & Towns, Mansions & Manors, Railroads	Northwest Philadelphia (Germantown)	
Ed Bradley (1941-2006)		September 30, 2021	Belmont & Parkside Ave. N, Philadelphia, PA; 39.99°N 75.22°W	Roadside	African American, Publishing & Journalism	Fairmount Park (Wynnefield Heights)	
Eddie Gottlieb (1898-1979)	Eddie Gottlieb (1898-1979)	May 21, 2014	S Phila. High School, Snyder Ave. & Broad St., Philadelphia; 39.92416°N 75.16956°W	Roadside	Basketball, Professions & Vocations, Sports & Recreation	South Philadelphia (Lower Moyamensing)	
Eddie Lang	Eddie Lang	October 15, 1995	S 7th St., just N of Clymer St., Philadelphia; 39.93999°N 75.15452°W	City	Performers	Bella Vista	
Edmund N. Bacon (1910-2005)		September 13, 2006	JFK Blvd., between N 15th & N 16th Sts., Phila. 39.95378°N 75.16563°W	City	Buildings & Architecture, Cities & Towns, Professions & Vocations	Market East	
Edward Drinker Cope	Edward Drinker Cope	November 6, 2002	2100-02 Pine St., Philadelphia; 39.9469°N 75.17681°W	City	Education, Science & Medicine, Professions & Vocations, Writers	Rittenhouse Square	
Elfreth's Alley	Elfreth's Alley	June 3, 2016	2nd St. & Elfreth's Alley, Philadelphia; 39.95279°N 75.14292°W	City	Buildings & Architecture, Business & Industry, Ethnic & Immigration, Labor	Old City	
Elisha Kent Kane (1820-1857)	Elisha Kent Kane (1820-1857)	August 26, 2016	Laurel Hill Cemetery, 3822 Ridge Ave., Philadelphia; 40.00437°N 75.19037°W	Roadside	Exploration	Upper North Philadelphia (Laurel Hill Cemetery)	
Elizabeth Drinker (1735-1807)	Elizabeth Sandwith Drinker historical marker	November 16, 2019	147 N 2nd St., Philadelphia; 39.95334°N 75.14295°W	City	American Revolution, Government & Politics 18th Century, Women, Writers	Old City	
Elizabeth Taylor Greenfield (1809-1876)	Elizabeth Taylor Greenfield (1809-1876)	1992	1013 Rodman St., Philadelphia; 39.94322°N 75.15911°W	City	African American, Music & Theater, Performers, Women	Washington Square West	
Engine Company No. 11	Engine Company No. 11	April 23, 2005	1016 South St. at Alder, Philadelphia; 39.94282°N 75.15927°W	City	African American, Police and Safety	Bella Vista	
ENIAC	ENIAC	June 15, 2000	200 S 33rd St., S of Walnut St., Philadelphia; 39.95235°N 75.19003°W	City	Business and Industry, Invention	University City	
Fairmount Park - Commonwealth Treasure	Fairmount Park - Commonwealth Treasure	October 9, 2001	Kelly Dr. and Sedgely Dr., Philadelphia; 39.96961°N 75.18482°W	Roadside	Buildings and Architecture, Environment, Sports and Recreation	Fairmount Park	
Fairmount Water Works	Fairmount Water Works	April 9, 1997	At waterworks, corner of Waterworks Dr. & Kelly Dr., Philadelphia; 39.96906°N 75.18461°W	Roadside	Buildings & Architecture, Business & Industry, Science & Medicine	Fairmount Park	
Father Divine	Father Divine	September 11, 1994	NE corner, N Broad St. & Ridge Ave., Philadelphia; 39.96675°N 75.16029°W	City	African American, Civil Rights, Religion, Inns & Taverns	North Philadelphia West (Spring Garden)	
Federal Street Burial Ground	Federal Street Burial Ground	October 4, 1990	Federal St., between 11th & 12th Sts., Philadelphia; 39.93513°N 75.16279°W	City	Civil War, Education, Military, Professions & Vocations, Publishing & Journalism, Religion	South Philadelphia (Passyunk Square)	
Female Medical College of Pennsylvania	Female Medical College of Pennsylvania	September 30, 1996	2900 W Queen Ln., at Drexel College of Med. entrance, Philadelphia; 40.01972°N 75.18103°W	City	Education, Science & Medicine, Women	Northwest Philadelphia (Germantown)	
First African Baptist Church (16th Street)	First African Baptist Church (16th Street)	January 1, 1992	16th & Christian Sts., Philadelphia; 39.94041°N 75.16969°W	City	African American, Religion	Graduate Hospital	
First African Baptist Church (West Philadelphia)		September 23, 2017	6700 Lansdowne Ave., Philadelphia; 39.97443°N 75.2537°W	Roadside	African American, Education, Religion	West Philadelphia (Overbrook Park)	
First African Baptist Church Cemetery	First African Baptist Church Cemetery	1992	SW corner, N 8th & Vine Sts., Philadelphia; 39.95649°N 75.15302°W	City	African American, Religion	Chinatown	
First African Presbyterian Church		1993	N 42nd & Girard Ave., Philadelphia; 39.97355°N 75.20954°W	City	African American, Religion	Fairmount Park (Parkside)	
First Protest Against Slavery	First Protest Against Slavery	October 8, 1983	5109 Germantown Ave. at Wister St., Philadelphia; 40.03009°N 75.16492°W	City	African American, Ethnic & Immigration, Government & Politics, Religion	Northwest Philadelphia (Germantown)	
First Republican National Convention	First Republican National Convention	June 17, 2000	808 Locust Street, Philadelphia; 39.94736°N 75.15515°W	City	Abraham Lincoln, Government & Politics, Government & Politics 19th Century	Washington Square West	
First Troop Philadelphia City Cavalry		January 1, 2021	22 S 23rd St., Philadelphia; 39.95322°N 75.17816°W	Roadside	American Revolution, Civil War, Military	Rittenhouse Square	
Fort Mifflin	Fort Mifflin	May 10, 1990	At site, Fort Mifflin Rd., Philadelphia; 39.87649°N 75.21211°W	City	American Revolution, Forts, Military	Southwest Philadelphia (Airport)	
Frances E.W. Harper (1825-1911)	Frances E.W. Harper (1825-1911)	March 25, 1992	1006 Bainbridge St., Philadelphia; 39.94198°N 75.15944°W	City	African American, Civil Rights, Education, Underground Railroad, Women, Writers	Bella Vista	
Francis Daniel Pastorius	Francis Daniel Pastorius	October 1924	502 S. Front St. (west side, near South St.), Philadelphia; 39.941826°N 75.144086°W	Plaque	Cities & Towns, Early Settlement, Ethnic & Immigration, Government & Politics 17th Century	Society Hill	
Francis Johnson (1792-1844)	Francis Johnson (1792-1844)	October 3, 1992	536 Pine St., Philadelphia; 39.94383°N 75.15166°W	City	African American, Performers	Society Hill	
Frank Furness (1839-1912)	Frank Furness (1839-1912)	September 14, 2012	1426 Pine St., Philadelphia; 39.94567°N 75.16642°W	City	Buildings & Architecture, Professions & Vocations	Rittenhouse Square	
Frank Gasparro (1909-2001)	Frank Gasparro (1909-2001)	November 1, 2002	727 Carpenter St., Philadelphia; 39.93703°N 75.15581°W	Roadside	Artists, Government & Politics, Professions & Vocations	Bella Vista	
Frank N. Piasecki (1919-2008)	Frank N. Piasecki (1919-2008)	April 17, 2010	1937 Callowhill St., north side of Callowhill between 19th & 20th 39.96087°N 75.1711°W	Roadside	Business & Industry, Invention, Military, Professions & Vocations	Logan Square	
Fraunces Tavern		1991	166 S 2nd St., (just W of Dock St.) Philadelphia; 39.94639°N 75.14485°W	City	Buildings & Architecture, Business & Industry, George Washington, Professions & Vocations, Inns & Taverns	Society Hill	
Frederick Douglass Memorial Hospital	Frederick Douglass Memorial Hospital	1992	1522 Lombard St., Philadelphia; 39.94503°N 75.16801°W	City	African American, Science & Medicine, Professions & Vocations	Rittenhouse Square	
Free African Society	Free African Society	1992	at Mother Bethel Church, S 6th & Lombard Sts., Philadelphia; 39.94317°N 75.15205°W	City	African American, Government & Politics	Society Hill	
Freedom Now Rally		June 19, 2010	intersection of 40th St., Lancaster Ave., and Haverford Ave., Philadelphia; 39.96296°N 75.20232°W	Roadside	African American, Civil Rights, Government & Politics 20th Century	West Philadelphia (Haverford North)	
Freedom Theatre	Freedom Theatre	May 16, 1991	1346 N Broad St. (PA 611) at Master, Philadelphia; 39.97438°N 75.15894°W	City	African American, Music & Theater, Performers	North Philadelphia West (Cecil B. Moore)	
Gay Rights Demonstrations July 4, 1965 - 1969	Gay Rights Demonstrations July 4, 1965 - 1969	July 1, 2005	NW corner of S 6th & Chestnut Sts. 39.94939°N 75.15071°W	City	Civil Rights, Government & Politics 20th Century	Independence Mall	
George Gordon Meade (1815-1872)	George Gordon Meade (1815-1872)	November 6, 1999	S 19th St., between Panama St. & Delancey Pl., Philadelphia; 39.94688°N 75.17293°W	City	Civil War, Military	Rittenhouse Square	
German Society of Pennsylvania, The	German Society of Pennsylvania, The	October 6, 2008	611 Spring Garden St. (at N 7th), Philadelphia; 39.96155°N 75.14922°W	Roadside	Ethnic & Immigration	North Philadelphia East (Northern Liberties)	
Germantown Meetinghouse	Germantown Meetinghouse	September 10, 2008	6611 Germantown Ave., Philadelphia; 40.05004°N 75.1842°W	City	Buildings & Architecture, Religion	Northwest Philadelphia (Mount Airy)	
Gertrude E.H. Bustill Mossell (1855-1948)	Gertrude E.H. Bustill Mossell (1855-1948)	1993	1423 Lombard St., Philadelphia; 39.94469°N 75.16629°W	City	Women, Writers	Rittenhouse Square	
Giannini Family	Giannini Family	October 1, 2005	735 Christian St., Philadelphia; 39.93851°N 75.15573°W	City	Music & Theater, Performers	Bella Vista	
Giovanni's Room	Giovanni's Room	October 9, 2011	NE corner, S 12th & Pine Sts., Philadelphia; 39.94501°N 75.16128°W	City	Buildings & Architecture, Civil Rights	Washington Square West	
Girard College Civil Rights Landmark	Girard College Civil Rights Landmark	1992	NE corner, Corinthian and Girard Aves., Philadelphia; 39.97312°N 75.16986°W	City	African American, Civil Rights, Education, Government & Politics, Professions & Vocations	North Philadelphia West (Cecil B. Moore)	
Girl Scout Cookies	Girl Scout Cookies	January 16, 2001	1401 Arch St., Philadelphia; 39.95444°N 75.16376°W	City	Business & Industry, Women	Logan Square (Hahnemann)	
Glomar Explorer	Glomar Explorer	August 2, 2006	At Independence Seaport Mus., 211 S Columbus Blvd. & Walnut St., Philadelphia; 39.94633°N 75.14014°W	Roadside	Government & Politics 20th Century, Military	Penn's Landing	
Gloria Casarez (1971-2014)	Gloria Casarez (1971-2014)	October 8, 2021	1 S. Penn Square. North Side of City Hall in front of the flag poles to represent the LBGT office where she was the first director. 39.95293°N 75.16321°W	Roadside	Civil Rights, Government & Politics 20th Century, Latino American, LGBTQ	Market East (City Hall)	
Gloria Dei Church (Old Swedes')	Gloria Dei Church (Old Swedes')	December 17, 1954	916 Swanson St. at N facade of bldg., near Christian St. & Christopher Columbus Blvd. 39.93706°N 75.14208°W	City	Buildings & Architecture, Early Settlement, Ethnic & Immigration, Religion	Penn's Landing	
Grand Battery, The	Grand Battery, The	December 7, 1997	S Columbus Blvd., near US Coast Guard Station, Philadelphia; 39.93262°N 75.14346°W	Roadside	Forts, French & Indian War, Military	Penn's Landing	
Grand United Order of Odd Fellows, The		1992	S 12th & Spruce Sts., Philadelphia; 39.946522°N 75.161056°W	City	African American, Science & Medicine	Washington Square West	Missing
Greenbelt Knoll	Greenbelt Knoll	June 10, 2007	SW corner, Holme Ave. & Longford St., Philadelphia; 40.05628°N 75.02216°W	Roadside	African American, Buildings & Architecture, Cities & Towns, Civil Rights, Houses & Homesteads	Northeast Philadelphia (Torresdale)	
Hannah Callowhill Penn	Hannah Callowhill Penn	October 24, 2000	S 2nd St. & Sansom St. Walkway (Welcome Park), Philadelphia; 39.94743°N 75.14427°W	City	Government & Politics, William Penn, Women	Old City	
Hannah Penn	Hannah Penn	December 1926	135 S. 2nd St. (SE corner of 2nd & Sansom), Philadelphia; 39.947155°N 75.144338°W	Plaque	Government & Politics 18th Century, William Penn, Women	Old City	Missing
Harvey Pollack (1922-2015)		May 19, 2016	Grounds of Wells Fargo Center, near Xfinity, off Zinkoff Blvd., Philadelphia; 39.90361°N 75.17009°W	Roadside	Basketball, Professions & Vocations, Sports & Recreation	South Philadelphia (Sports Complex)	
Haym Salomon (1740-1785)	Haym Salomon (1740-1785)	September 7, 1997	45 N 5th St., Philadelphia; 39.95116°N 75.14719°W	City	American Revolution, Ethnic & Immigration, Military, Professions & Vocations, Religion	Independence Mall	
Henry George	Henry George	November 18, 1984	413 S. 10th St., Philadelphia; 39.94418°N 75.15819°W	City	Business & Industry, Government & Politics, Writers	Washington Square West	
Henry L. Phillips (1847-1935)		1993	620 S 8th St., Philadelphia; 39.94182°N 75.1555°W	City	African American, Religion	Bella Vista	
Henry O. Tanner (1859-1937)	Henry O. Tanner (1859-1937)	January 19, 1991	2908 W Diamond St., Philadelphia; 39.98792°N 75.18123°W	City	African American, Artists, Religion	North Philadelphia West (Strawberry Mansion)	
Herman Herzog (1831-1932)		September 12, 2011	4101 Pine St. 39.95107°N 75.20582°W	Roadside	Artists, Ethnic & Immigration	University City	
Hershey's First Candy Store	Hershey's First Candy Store	June 1, 2009	935 Spring Garden St., Philadelphia; 39.96163°N 75.1543°W	Roadside	Business & Industry, Entrepreneurs, Professions & Vocations	North Philadelphia East (Callowhill)	
Historical Society of Pennsylvania	Historical Society of Pennsylvania	October 25, 2010	1300 Locust St. 39.94806°N 75.16261°W	City	Education	Washington Square West	
Hotel Brotherhood USA	Hotel Brotherhood USA	October 22, 2016	1523-29 Bainbridge St., Philadelphia; 39.94317°N 75.16839°W	City	African American, Labor, Professions & Vocations	Graduate Hospital	
House of Industry	House of Industry	June 27, 1996	714 Catharine St., Philadelphia; 39.93904°N 75.15509°W	City	Education, Ethnic & Immigration, Labor	Bella Vista	
Institute for Colored Youth	Institute for Colored Youth	1991	915 Bainbridge Sts., Philadelphia; 39.94183°N 75.1577°W	City	African American, Agriculture, Education, Labor	Bella Vista	
Insurance Company of North America	Insurance Company of North America	April 26, 2017	436 Walnut St., Philadelphia; 39.94742°N 75.14904°W	Roadside	Business & Industry, Invention	Independence Mall	
Israel Goldstein (1896-1986)	Israel Goldstein (1896-1986)	November 20, 2002	At S Phila. High School, 2101 S Broad St., Philadelphia; 39.92364°N 75.16969°W	Roadside	Education, Ethnic & Immigration, Government & Politics 20th Century, Religion	South Philadelphia (Lower Moyamensing)	
Jack and Jill of America Foundation	Jack and Jill of America Foundation	1993	1605 Christian St., Philadelphia; 39.9405°N 75.1698°W	City	African American, Education, Women	Graduate Hospital	
Jacob C. White Jr. (1837-1902)	Jacob C. White Jr. (1837-1902)	1991	1032 Lombard St., Philadelphia; 39.94397°N 75.15944°W	City	African American, Baseball, Education, Science & Medicine, Sports & Recreation, Underground Railroad	Washington Square West	
James Forten (1766-1842)	James Forten (1766-1842)	April 24, 1990	336 Lombard St., Philadelphia; 39.94254°N 75.14858°W	City	African American, Professions & Vocations, Underground Railroad	Society Hill	
Jefferson House		September 10, 1954	7th St. near Market St., Philadelphia (Missing); 39.950936°N 75.152°W	City	Government & Politics, Government & Politics 18th Century, Houses & Homesteads	Independence Mall	Missing
Jefferson Street Ballparks		September 30, 2017	outside park on Jefferson St. at Bailey St., Philadelphia; 39.97844°N 75.17868°W	Roadside	African American, Baseball, Sports & Recreation	North Philadelphia West (Brewerytown)	
Jessie Redmon Fauset	Jessie Redmon Fauset	1993	1853 N 17th St., Philadelphia; 39.98284°N 75.16189°W	City	African American, Women, Writers	North Philadelphia West (Cecil B. Moore)	
Jewish Hospital, The		October 11, 2017	At hospital, 5501 Old York Rd., at intersection of Albert Einstein Dr., Philadelphia; 40.03695°N 75.14461°W	Roadside	Ethnic & Immigration, Science & Medicine, Religion	Upper North Philadelphia (Fern Rock)	
Joe Venuti (1903-1978)	Joe Venuti (1903-1978)	April 18, 1997	NE corner S 8th & Fitzwater Sts., Philadelphia; 39.94068°N 75.15573°W	City	Music & Theater, Performers	Bella Vista	MISSING as of 10/12/2026
John Bartram (1699-1777)	John Bartram (1699-1777)	June 6, 1955	Harley Ave. at Lindbergh Blvd., West Philadelphia; 39.9329°N 75.21546°W	City	Environment, Professions & Vocations	Southwest Philadelphia (Kingsessing)	
John C. Asbury (1862-1941)	John C. Asbury (1862-1941)	April 24, 2014	1710 Christian St., Philadelphia; 39.94058°N 75.17157°W	City	African American, Government & Politics 20th Century, Science & Medicine, Publishing & Journalism	Graduate Hospital	
John E. Fryer, M.D. (1937-2003)	John E. Fryer, M.D. (1937-2003)	October 3, 2017	13th and Locust Sts., Philadelphia; 39.94807°N 75.16228°W	Roadside	Civil Rights, Science & Medicine	Washington Square West	
John J. McDermott (1891-1971)	John J. McDermott (1891-1971)	October 9, 2014	Kingsessing Library, 1201 S 51st St., Philadelphia; 39.94203°N 75.21821°W	Roadside	Professions & Vocations, Sports & Recreation	Southwest Philadelphia (Kingsessing)	
John Nepomuk Maelzel (1772-1838)	John Nepomuk Maelzel (1772-1838)	July 5, 2004	NW corner, S 5th St. & St. James Ct., Philadelphia; 39.94694°N 75.15044°W	City	Business & Industry, Entrepreneurs, Ethnic & Immigration, Invention, Performers, Sports & Recreation	Society Hill	Missing
John Page Nicholson (1842-1922)		May 2, 1998	1805 Pine St., Philadelphia; 39.94651°N 75.17176°W	City	Civil War, Military, Professions & Vocations	Rittenhouse Square	
John Penn	John Penn	October 1932	242 S 3rd St., Philadelphia; 39.94572°N 75.14658°W	Plaque	Government & Politics 18th Century, William Penn	Society Hill	
John S. Trower (1849-1911)	John S. Trower	October 3, 2021	5706 Germantown Ave., Philadelphia; 40.0359°N 75.1752°W	City	African American, Education, Entrepreneurs	Northwest Philadelphia (Germantown)	
John W. Coltrane (1926-1967)	John W. Coltrane (1926-1967)	July 17, 1990	1511 N 33rd St., Philadelphia; 39.9803°N 75.18878°W	City	African American, Music & Theater, Performers	Fairmount Park	
John Wanamaker (1838-1922)	John Wanamaker (1838-1922)	July 11, 1998	S 13th & Market Sts., Philadelphia; 39.95201°N 75.16179°W	Roadside	Business & Industry, Education, Entrepreneurs, Government & Politics 19th Century, Invention, Professions & Vocations, Religion	Market East	
Johnson House, The	Johnson House, The	June 1, 1995	6306 Germantown Ave., Philadelphia; 40.04328°N 75.1809°W	City	African American, Houses & Homesteads, Religion, Underground Railroad	Northwest Philadelphia (Germantown)	
Joseph and Amy Cassey (1789-1848)/(1809-56)	Joseph and Amy Cassey (1789-1848)/(1809-56)	March 13, 2009	S 4th St. between Chestnut and Market, Philadelphia. 39.94924°N 75.14785°W	City	African American, Professions & Vocations	Independence Mall	
Joseph Bonaparte (1768-1844)	Joseph Bonaparte (1768-1844)	January 9, 2000	260 S 9th Street, Philadelphia; 39.94634°N 75.15614°W	City	Government & Politics, Government & Politics 19th Century	Washington Square West	
Joseph Huston (1866-1940)	Joseph Huston (1866-1940)	October 20, 2005	5829 Wissahickon Ave., Germantown, Philadelphia; 40.02888°N 75.18546°W	City	Buildings & Architecture, Houses & Homesteads, Professions & Vocations	Northwest Philadelphia (Germantown)	
Julian Francis Abele (1881-1950)	Julian Francis Abele (1881-1950)	February 12, 1991	At Philadelphia Museum of Art steps, 26th & Franklin Pkwy. 39.96495°N 75.17958°W	Roadside	African American, Buildings & Architecture, Professions & Vocations	Fairmount Park	
Kahal Kodosh Mikveh Israel	Kahal Kodosh Mikveh Israel	1991	313 Cherry St. at Orianna St., Philadelphia; 39.95311°N 75.14584°W	City	Ethnic & Immigration, Religion	Old City	
Kelly Family, The	Kelly Family, The	October 27, 2012	At the corner of W Coulter St. & Henry Ave., Philadelphia; 40.01784°N 75.18896°W	Roadside	Government & Politics 20th Century, Motion Pictures & Television, Performers, Sports & Recreation, Women	Northwest Philadelphia (Germantown)	
Kelpius Community	Kelpius Community	April 17, 2004	Hermit Ln. near Henry Ave., Fairmount Park, Philadelphia; 40.02517°N 75.20085°W	Roadside	Education, Ethnic & Immigration, Native American, Religion, William Penn	Northwest Philadelphia (Germantown)	
Knowlton	Knowlton	November 12, 1994	8001 Verree Rd., Philadelphia; 40.07233°N 75.07452°W	City	Buildings & Architecture, Houses & Homesteads	Northeast Philadelphia (Fox Chase)	
Laura Wheeler Waring (1887-1948)	Laura Wheeler Waring (1887-1948)	1992	756 N 43rd St., Philadelphia; 39.96644°N 75.20966°W	City	African American, Artists, Education, Women	West Philadelphia (Haverford North)	
Laurel Hill Cemetery	Laurel Hill Cemetery	May 20, 2000	3822 Ridge Ave., Philadelphia; 40.00427°N 75.18743°W	Roadside	Buildings & Architecture, Environment	Upper North Philadelphia (Laurel Hill Cemetery)	
Legendary Blue Horizon, The	Legendary Blue Horizon, The	October 24, 2003	1314 N Broad St., Philadelphia; 39.97389°N 75.15898°W	City	African American, Sports & Recreation	North Philadelphia West (Cecil B. Moore)	
Leopold Stokowski (1882-1977)	Leopold Stokowski Historical Marker at 240 S. Broad St. Philadelphia PA	September 18, 2021	240 S Broad St., Philadelphia; 39.9480°N 75.1647°W	City	Music & Theater	Rittenhouse Square	
Liberation of Jane Johnson, The	Liberation of Jane Johnson, The	July 18, 2009	211 S Columbus Blvd., Penn's Landing near Walnut St. pedestrian walkway and entrance to Independence Seaport Museum, Philadelphia; 39.94637°N 75.14065°W	Roadside	African American, Government & Politics 19th Century, Women	Penn's Landing	
Lombard Street Riot	Lombard Street Riot Historical Marker at 6th and Lombard Sts. Philadelphia PA	November 23, 2005	SE corner of S 6th & Lombard Sts., Philadelphia; 39.94299°N 75.15205°W	City	African American	Society Hill	
London Coffee House		1991	SW corner, Front & Market Sts., Philadelphia; 39.94946°N 75.14222°W	City	African American, Business & Industry	Old City	
Lorenzo L. Langstroth (1810-1895)	Lorenzo L. Langstroth (1810-1895)	September 10, 2010	106 S Front St., Phila. 39.94802°N 75.14248°W	City	Business & Industry, Invention, Science & Medicine, Writers	Old City	
Louis I. Kahn (1901-1974)		June 24, 2004	1501 Walnut St., Philadelphia; 39.94903°N 75.16572°W	City	Buildings & Architecture, Education, Professions & Vocations	Rittenhouse Square	
Louisa May Alcott	Louisa May Alcott	November 7, 1996	5427 Germantown Ave., Philadelphia; 40.03372°N 75.17139°W	City	Women, Writers	Northwest Philadelphia (Germantown)	
Marc Blitzstein (1905-1964)	Marc Blitzstein (1905-1964)	June 12, 2017	419 Pine St., Philadelphia; 39.94386°N 75.14961°W	City	Music & Theater, Performers, Professions & Vocations, Writers	Society Hill	
Marian Anderson	Marian Anderson	1993	At Union Baptist Church, 1910 Fitzwater St., Philadelphia; 39.94279°N 75.17442°W	City	African American, Performers, Women	Graduate Hospital	
Mario Lanza (1921-1959)	Mario Lanza (1921-1959)	November 7, 1993	634-36 Christian St., Philadelphia; 39.93833°N 75.15453°W	City	Motion Pictures & Television, Music & Theater, Performers	Bella Vista	
Mason–Dixon Survey	Mason–Dixon Survey	August 30, 2013	Front & South Sts., Philadelphia; 39.94089°N 75.14369°W	Roadside	Exploration, Government & Politics 17th Century, Government & Politics 18th Century, Science & Medicine, Native American, Professions & Vocations	Queen Village	
Masonic Temple Philadelphia	Masonic Temple Philadelphia	December 5, 2007	One N Broad St. 39.95356°N 75.16320°W	City	Buildings & Architecture	Market East	
Mathew Carey (1760-1839)	Mathew Carey (1760-1839)	September 14, 2014	324 Marker St., Philadelphia; 39.95063°N 75.14668°W	Roadside	Ethnic & Immigration, Government & Politics 18th Century, Government & Politics 19th Century, Professions & Vocations, Publishing & Journalism, Writers	Independence Mall	
Maxfield Parrish (1870-1966)	Maxfield Parrish (1870-1966)	September 16, 2015	in front of Curtis Bldg., S 6th St. between Sansom & Walnut. 39.94796°N 75.15114°W	Roadside	Artists, Professions & Vocations	Independence Mall	
McClellan House		October 14, 1997	912 Walnut St., Philadelphia; 39.94817°N 75.15652°W	City	Education	Washington Square West	
Mechanics' Union of Trade Associations	Mechanics' Union of Trade Associations	June 30, 2004	Chestnut & Bank Sts., Philadelphia; 39.94848°N 75.14521°W	City	Education, Government & Politics 19th Century, Labor	Old City	
Medical Library Association	Medical Library Association	November 4, 2015	1420-22 Chestnut St., Philadelphia; 39.95065°N 75.16508°W	City	Education, Science & Medicine, Women	Rittenhouse Square	
Mercy Hospital		1992	NW corner, S 17th & Fitzwater Sts., Philadelphia; 39.94254°N 75.17072°W	City	African American, Science & Medicine, Professions & Vocations	Graduate Hospital	
Meriwether Lewis (1774-1809)	Meriwether Lewis (1774-1809)	August 12, 2003	1900 Ben Franklin Pky., Philadelphia; 39.95732°N 75.17108°W	City	Education, Environment, Exploration, Science & Medicine	Logan Square	
Meta V.W. Fuller (1877-1968)	Meta V.W. Fuller (1877-1968)	1992	254 S 12th St., Philadelphia; 39.94697°N 75.16101°W	City	African American, Artists, Women	Washington Square West	
Mikveh Israel Cemetery	Mikveh Israel Cemetery	1957	Spruce St. between Schell & Darien Sts., Philadelphia; 39.94583°N 75.15566°W	City	Ethnic & Immigration, Religion	Washington Square West	
Mother Bethel A.M.E. Church	Mother Bethel A.M.E. Church	March 19, 1991	NE corner, S 6th & Lombard Sts., Philadelphia; 39.94316°N 75.15204°W	City	African American, Religion, Underground Railroad	Society Hill	
Mother Jones (1830-1930)	Mother Jones (1830-1930)	November 12, 1994	N Broad St. & JFK Blvd., N side of City Hall, Philadelphia; 39.95324°N 75.16304°W	City	Labor, Women	Market East (City Hall)	
Mother's Day	Mother's Day Historical Marker at Market and N. Juniper Sts. Philadelphia PA	June 1, 1998	Traffic island, Market & Juniper Sts. (E side of City Hall), Philadelphia; 39.95215°N 75.16254°W	City	Women	Market East (City Hall)	
MOVE Bombing, The		June 24, 2017	Cobbs Creek Pkwy. on Cobbs Creek Park side of street opposite Osage Ave. 39.95573°N 75.24834°W	City	African American, Government & Politics 20th Century, Police and Safety	West Philadelphia (Cobbs Creek)	
Mower General Hospital	Mower General Hospital	September 17, 2000	Willow Grove Ave. & Wyndmoor St., Philadelphia; 40.07381°N 75.19753°W	City	Civil War, Military	Northwest Philadelphia (Chestnut Hill)	
Moyamensing Prison	Moyamensing Prison	May 4, 2011	E Passyunk Ave. & S 10th St., at corner of Reed, Philadelphia; 39.9319°N 75.16111°W	Roadside		South Philadelphia (Passyunk Square)	
Muhammad's Temple of Islam #12		August 20, 2016	4218 Lancaster Ave., Philadelphia; 39.96687°N 75.20848°W	City	African American, Religion	West Philadelphia (Haverford North)	
National Funeral for President Washington		December 14, 1999	SE corner, N 4th & Cherry Streets, Philadelphia; 39.95296°N 75.14671°W	Roadside	George Washington, Government & Politics, Government & Politics 18th Century	Independence Mall	
New Century Guild	New Century Guild	June 19, 1997	1307 Locust St., Philadelphia; 39.94791°N 75.16267°W	City	Labor, Women	Washington Square West	
NFL Films	NFL Films	July 23, 2009	230 N 13th St. 39.95678°N 75.16031°W	City		Chinatown	MISSING as of 10/12/2026
Nicholas Biddle (1786-1844)	Nicholas Biddle (1786-1844)	2000	715 Spruce St., Philadelphia; 39.94581°N 75.15337°W	City	Business & Industry, Entrepreneurs, Exploration	Washington Square West	
Nicola Monachesi (c. 1795-1851)		May 24, 2017	at St. Augustine's R.C. Church, 246-60 N 4th St., Philadelphia; 39.95552°N 75.14621°W	Roadside	Artists, Buildings & Architecture, Ethnic & Immigration, Professions & Vocations, Religion	Old City	
Octavius V. Catto (1839-1871)	Octavius V. Catto (1839-1871)	1992	812 South St., Philadelphia; 39.94245°N 75.15593°W	City	African American, Civil Rights, Civil War, Education, Government & Politics, Military	Washington Square West	
Old St. Joseph's Roman Catholic Church		July 31, 2014	324 Walnut St., Philadelphia; 39.94722°N 75.14765°W	Roadside	Buildings & Architecture, Religion	Independence Mall	
Old St. Mary's Roman Catholic Church	Old St. Mary's Roman Catholic Church	December 8, 2013	at church, 250-252 S 4th St., Philadelphia; 39.94547°N 75.14842°W	Roadside	American Revolution, Buildings & Architecture, Government & Politics 18th Century, Religion	Society Hill	
Oldest Photograph	Oldest Photograph	September 25, 1989	NW corner, Chestnut & Juniper Sts., Philadelphia; 39.95068°N 75.16297°W	City	Artists, Business & Industry, Invention, Science & Medicine, Professions & Vocations	Market East	
Opportunities Industrialization Centers		November 23, 1990	N 19th St., between Turner & Oxford Sts., Philadelphia; 39.97855°N 75.16603°W	City	African American, Education	North Philadelphia West (Cecil B. Moore)	
Ora Washington (1899-1971)		November 5, 2004	6128 Germantown Ave., Philadelphia; 40.04133°N 75.17963°W	City	African American, Sports & Recreation, Women	Northwest Philadelphia (Germantown)	
Owen Wister (1860-1938)	Owen Wister (1860-1938)	October 7, 2001	5203 Germantown Ave., Philadelphia; 40.03101°N 75.16672°W	City	Motion Pictures & Television, Writers	Northwest Philadelphia (Germantown)	
Palestra	Palestra Historical Marker	December 3, 2022	223 S. 33rd St; 39.951411°N 75.188606°W	City	Bridges, Buildings & Architecture, Sports & Recreation	University City	
Paul Philippe Cret (1876-1945)	Paul Philippe Cret (1876-1945)	May 23, 1992	516 Woodland Terrace, Philadelphia; 39.94902°N 75.20466°W	City	Bridges, Buildings & Architecture, Professions & Vocations	University City	
Paul Robeson (1898-1976)	Paul Robeson (1898-1976)	April 8, 1991	4951 Walnut St. (at 50th), Philadelphia; 39.95651°N 75.22143°W	City	African American, Music & Theater, Performers	West Philadelphia (Walnut Hill)	
Pearl Bailey (1919-1990)	Pearl Bailey (1919-1990)	1992	1946 N 23rd St., Philadelphia; 39.98494°N 75.17152°W	City	African American, Performers, Women	North Philadelphia West (Cecil B. Moore)	
Penn Relays, The	Penn Relays, The	April 29, 1995	At Franklin Field track entrance, 233 S 33rd St., Philadelphia; 39.95111°N 75.19068°W	Roadside	Sports & Recreation	University City	
Penn Treaty Park	Penn Treaty Park	September 18, 1976	At Park on Delaware River, foot of Cecil B. Moore (Columbia) Ave., Philadelphia; 39.96711°N 75.12849°W	Roadside	Native American, William Penn	North Philadelphia East (Fishtown)	
Pennepack Baptist Church	Pennepack Baptist Church	June 1, 2013	8732 Krewstown Rd., Philadelphia; 40.08113°N 75.05098°W	Roadside	Buildings & Architecture, Early Settlement, Religion, William Penn	Northeast Philadelphia (Bustleton)	
Pennsylvania Abolition Society	Pennsylvania Abolition Society Historical Marker at S. Front near Walnut Sts. Philadelphia PA	1992	East side of Front St. between Walnut & Chestnut Sts., Philadelphia; 39.94735°N 75.14253°W	City	African American, Education, Underground Railroad	Old City	
Pennsylvania Academy of the Fine Arts	Pennsylvania Academy of the Fine Arts	November 17, 2004	At the academy, 118 N Broad St., Philadelphia; 39.95501°N 75.16307°W	City	Artists, Buildings & Architecture, Education	Logan Square (Hahnemann)	
Pennsylvania Bible Society	Pennsylvania Bible Society historical marker	April 26, 2014	NW corner of 7th & Walnut Sts., Philadelphia; 39.94799°N 75.15281°W	City	Education, Publishing & Journalism, Religion	Independence Mall	
Pennsylvania Hall	Pennsylvania Hall	1992	N 6th St. south of Race St., Philadelphia; 39.9541°N 75.14973°W	City	African American, Government & Politics, Government & Politics 19th Century, Underground Railroad	Independence Mall	
Pennsylvania Hospital	Pennsylvania Hospital	December 17, 1954	Pine St. between 8th & 9th Sts., Philadelphia; 39.94436°N 75.15582°W	City	Science & Medicine, Professions & Vocations	Washington Square West	
Pennsylvania Slave Trade, The		August 5, 2016	at Independence Seaport Museum near waterfront, 211 S Columbus Blvd., Philadelphia; 39.94618°N 75.13991°W	Roadside	African American, Government & Politics 17th Century, William Penn	Penn's Landing	
Pennsylvania Station	Pennsylvania Station	December 17, 1996	N side of Market St. between 29th & 30th Sts., Philadelphia; 39.956667°N 75.181667°W	City	Railroads, Transportation	University City	Missing
Pennypack Creek Bridge	Pennypack Creek Bridge	October 13, 2012	Pennypack Park, Frankford Ave. & Solly Ave., Philadelphia; 40.04362°N 75.01993°W	Roadside	American Revolution, Bridges, Early Settlement, Native American, Roads	Northeast Philadelphia (Holmesburg)	
Philadelphia	Philadelphia	December 6, 1982	Traffic island at N. Broad St. (PA 611) & John F. Kennedy Blvd., just N of City Hall; 39.95346°N 75.16346°W	City	Cities & Towns, William Penn	Market East (City Hall)	
Philadelphia & Columbia Railroad	Philadelphia & Columbia Railroad	May 17, 2001	Edgley Ave. off Belmont Ave. (W Fairmount Park), Philadelphia; 39.9956°N 75.21644°W	Roadside	Business & Industry, Government & Politics 19th Century, Railroads, Transportation	Fairmount Park (Wynnefield Heights)	
Philadelphia Chinatown	Philadelphia Chinatown	October 8, 2010	913 Race St. 39.95515°N 75.15501°W	City	Ethnic & Immigration	Chinatown	
Philadelphia College of Pharmacy and Science		January 4, 1971	At entrance, S 43rd St. & Kingsessing Ave., West Philadelphia; 39.94676°N 75.20864°W	Roadside	Education	University City	
Philadelphia College of Textiles and Science		May 16, 1969	Campus, School House Ln. near Henry Ave., Germantown, Philadelphia; 40.02131°N 75.19162°W	Roadside	Education	Northwest Philadelphia (Germantown)	
Philadelphia Contributionship, The	Philadelphia Contributionship, The	December 17, 1954	212 S 4th St., Philadelphia; 39.94719°N 75.14809°W	City	Business & Industry	Independence Mall	
Philadelphia Female Anti-Slavery Society	Philadelphia Female Anti-Slavery Society	1992	N 5th & Arch Sts. (at US Mint), Philadelphia; 39.95298°N 75.14822°W	City	African American, Government & Politics, Underground Railroad, Women	Independence Mall	
Philadelphia Flower Show		June 6, 2019	717 Chestnut St., Philadelphia; 39.9494°N 75.1531°W	City	Agriculture, Sports & Recreation	Market East	
Philadelphia Gay News	Philadelphia Gay News Historical Marker at 233 S. 13th St. Philadelphia PA	October 13, 2021	233 S 13th St., Philadelphia; 39.9478°N 75.1623°W	City	Publishing & Journalism, LGBTQ	Washington Square West	
Philadelphia General Hospital	Philadelphia General Hospital	November 5, 2007	Curie Blvd. & Osler Circle, Penn campus 39.94884°N 75.19646°W	Roadside	Buildings & Architecture, Science & Medicine, Professions & Vocations, Women	University City	
Philadelphia Knights of Pythias		1992	SE corner, S 19th & Addison Sts., Philadelphia; 39.94605°N 75.17332°W	City	African American	Rittenhouse Square	
Philadelphia Pyramid Club	Philadelphia Pyramid Club	1992	1517 Girard Ave., Philadelphia; 39.97165°N 75.16182°W	City	African American	North Philadelphia West (Cecil B. Moore)	
Philadelphia Sketch Club	Philadelphia Sketch Club	October 11, 2008	235 S Camac St., Philadelphia; 39.9474°N 75.16164°W	City	Artists	Washington Square West	
Philadelphia Tribune	Philadelphia Tribune	July 1, 1992	520-26 S 16th St., Philadelphia; 39.94453°N 75.16853°W	City	African American, Business & Industry	Rittenhouse Square	
Philadelphia Zoo, The	Philadelphia Zoo, The	June 27, 1996	3400 W Girard Ave. at zoo entrance, Philadelphia; 39.97473°N 75.1958°W	City	Sports & Recreation	Fairmount Park	
Philip Syng, Jr. (1703-1789)	Philip Syng Jr. Historical Market at S. Front near Market Sts. Philadelphia PA	September 28, 2003	Corner of Chestnut St. & S Front St., Philadelphia; 39.94844°N 75.14243°W	City	Government & Politics, Government & Politics 18th Century, Professions & Vocations	Old City	
Presbyterian Church in the U.S.A.	Presbyterian Church in the U.S.A.	July 1, 1989	NW corner, Arch & N 3rd Sts., Philadelphia; 39.95224°N 75.14543°W	City	Religion	Old City	
Prince Hall Grand Lodge		September 8, 1990	4301 N. Broad St. (Pa. 611), between St. Luke & Bristol, Philadelphia; 40.01908°N 75.1489°W	City	African American	Upper North Philadelphia (Hunting Park)	
Printz's (Old Swedes) Mill		October 18, 2008	7303 Woodland Ave., next to Cobbs Creek, Philadelphia; 39.91711°N 75.24693°W	Roadside	Business & Industry, Early Settlement, Mills, Native American, William Penn	Southwest Philadelphia (Elmwood Park)	
PSFS Building	PSFS Building	November 11, 2005	1200 Market St., Philadelphia; 39.95194°N 75.16016°W	City	Buildings & Architecture	Market East	
Public Sector Collective Bargaining		September 26, 2008	City Hall, north side, N Broad & Market Sts., Philadelphia; 39.95337°N 75.16378°W	City	Government & Politics, Labor	Market East (City Hall)	
Ralph Modjeski (1861-1940)	Ralph Modjeski (1861-1940)	September 15, 2007	NW corner, N 6th & Race Sts., at Franklin Sq. Park entrance, Philadelphia; 39.9549°N 75.14954°W	City	Bridges, Business & Industry, Ethnic & Immigration, Professions & Vocations	Independence Mall	
Reading Terminal & Market	Reading Terminal & Market	September 10, 2003	On site at Market St. near 12th, at Convention Ctr., Philadelphia; 39.95229°N 75.15913°W	Roadside	Business & Industry, Railroads, Transportation	Market East	
Rev. Dr. Leon Howard Sullivan (1922-2001)	Rev. Dr. Leon Howard Sullivan (1922-2001)	October 16, 2017	At Zion Baptist Church, 3600 N Broad St., Philadelphia; 40.00779°N 75.1517°W	Roadside	African American, Civil Rights, Government & Politics, Government & Politics 20th Century, Religion	Upper North Philadelphia (Hunting Park)	
Rev. Isaac Leeser (1806-1868)	Rev. Isaac Leeser (1806-1868)	September 28, 1998	Market St. between 54th & 55th, Philadelphia; 39.96082°N 75.23076°W	City	Ethnic & Immigration, Publishing & Journalism, Religion, Writers	West Philadelphia (Haddington)	
Rev. Jehu Jones, Jr. (1786-1852)		February 22, 1998	310 S. Quince St., Philadelphia (at Mask & Wig Club); 39.94591°N 75.16041°W	City	African American, Religion	Washington Square West	
Ricketts' Circus	Ricketts' Circus	July 15, 1982	S 12th & Market Sts., at Loew's Hotel, Philadelphia; 39.95158°N 75.15994°W	City	George Washington, Performers	Market East	
Rittenhouse Town	Rittenhouse Town	April 8, 1991	Lincoln Dr. at Rittenhouse St. just off Wissahickon Ave., Fairmount Park, Philadelphia; 40.02917°N 75.18995°W	Roadside	Buildings & Architecture, Business & Industry, Cities & Towns, Early Settlement, Mansions & Manors, Science & Medicine, Mills, Religion	Northwest Philadelphia (Germantown)	
Robert Aitken (1734-1802)		October 19, 2012	11 Market St., Philadelphia; 39.94965°N 75.14258°W	Roadside	American Revolution, Government & Politics 18th Century, Professions & Vocations, Publishing & Journalism, Religion	Old City	
Robert Bogle (1774-1848)		1991	112 S 8th St., Philadelphia; 39.941536°N 75.15567°W	City	African American, Professions & Vocations	Bella Vista	
Robert Cornelius	Robert Cornelius	December 9, 1994	S 8th & Ranstead Sts. (next to Siegmund Lubin marker), Philadelphia; 39.95047°N 75.15368°W	City	Business & Industry, Invention, Science & Medicine, Professions & Vocations	Market East	
Robert Mara Adger (1837-1910)	Robert Mara Adger (1837-1910)	1993	823 South St. (at S Darien St.), Philadelphia; 39.94257°N 75.15621°W	City	African American, Professions & Vocations, Underground Railroad	Washington Square West	
Robert Patterson (1743-1824)		July 22, 2004	West side of S 9th St., south of Market St., Philadelphia; 39.95067°N 75.15515°W	City	Education, Exploration	Market East	
Robert Purvis (1810-1898)	Robert Purvis (1810-1898)	February 21, 1992	1601 Mt. Vernon St., Philadelphia; 39.96494°N 75.16432°W	City	African American, Civil Rights, Professions & Vocations, Underground Railroad, Writers	North Philadelphia West (Spring Garden)	
Robert Smith	Robert Smith	January 14, 1983	606 S 2nd St., Philadelphia; 39.94088°N 75.14561°W	City	Buildings & Architecture, Ethnic & Immigration, Professions & Vocations	Queen Village	
Ronald McDonald House		October 15, 2019	3925 Chestnut St., Philadelphia; 39.95558°N 75.20136°W	Roadside	Houses & Homesteads, Science & Medicine, Women	University City	
Roy Campanella (1921-1993)	Roy Campanella (1921-1993)	May 29, 1996	Simon Gratz High School, N 18th St. & Hunting Park Ave., Philadelphia; 40.01465°N 75.1562°W	City	African American, Baseball, Sports & Recreation	Upper North Philadelphia (Nicetown)	
Ruth Plumly Thompson (1891-1976)		November 4, 2018	254 S Farragut St., Philadelphia; 39.9539°N 75.21507°W	City	Motion Pictures & Television, Women, Writers	West Philadelphia (Walnut Hill)	
Sadie T.M. Alexander (1898-1989)	Sadie T.M. Alexander (1898-1989)	1993	700 Westview St., Philadelphia; 40.04433°N 75.19628°W	City	African American, Civil Rights, Government & Politics, Government & Politics 20th Century, Women	Northwest Philadelphia (Mount Airy)	
Salvation Army, The	Salvation Army, The	June 19, 1998	350 W Oxford St. (at N 4th), Philadelphia; 39.9752°N 75.14232°W	City	Religion, Women	North Philadelphia East (Olde Kensington)	
Samuel Hopkins (1743-1818)	Samuel Hopkins (1743-1818)	July 29, 2000	119 Arch St., Philadelphia; 39.95194°N 75.14265°W	City	Business & Industry, George Washington, Government & Politics, Invention, Science & Medicine	Old City	
Samuel S. Fleisher Art Memorial	Samuel S. Fleisher Art Memorial	September 13, 2005	719 Catharine St., Philadelphia; 39.93915°N 75.15527°W	City	Artists, Education	Bella Vista	
Sarah Josepha Hale (1788-1879)	Sarah Josepha Hale (1788-1879)	November 14, 2015	922 Spruce St., Philadelphia; 39.94583°N 75.15742°W	City	Abraham Lincoln, Civil Rights, Government & Politics 19th Century, Professions & Vocations, Publishing & Journalism, Women, Writers	Washington Square West	
Satterlee U.S.A. General Hospital	Satterlee U.S.A. General Hospital	November 8, 2003	At Gettysburg Stone in Clark Park, between S 43rd & S 44th Sts. on Baltimore Ave., Philadelphia; 39.94901°N 75.21018°W	City	Civil War, Science & Medicine, Military	University City	
Schuylkill Arsenal	Schuylkill Arsenal	June 10, 2004	E Greys Ferry Rd. at Washington Ave., Philadelphia; 39.94042°N 75.18767°W	City	Civil War, Exploration, Military, Military Post-Civil War	Graduate Hospital	Missing
Schuylkill Navy of Philadelphia	Schuylkill Navy of Philadelphia	October 11, 2008	#4 Boathouse Row, Kelly Dr., Philadelphia; 39.96945°N 75.1862°W	Roadside	Buildings & Architecture, Sports & Recreation	Fairmount Park	
Shibe Park/Connie Mack Stadium	Shibe Park/Connie Mack Stadium	November 1, 1997	N 21st St. & Lehigh Ave., Philadelphia; 39.99539°N 75.16467°W	City	African American, Baseball, Sports & Recreation	Upper North Philadelphia (Strawberry Mansion)	
Shot Tower	Shot Tower	April 19, 1997	Carpenter & Front Sts., Philadelphia; 39.93467°N 75.14601°W	City	Buildings & Architecture, Business & Industry, Military, Religion, War of 1812	Penn's Landing	
Siegmund Lubin (1851-1923) (15th street)	Siegmund Lubin (1851-1923) (15th street)	April 11, 2007	1608 N 15th St., Philadelphia; 39.97796°N 75.16003°W	City	Invention, Motion Pictures & Television, Professions & Vocations	North Philadelphia West (Cecil B. Moore)	
Siegmund Lubin (1851-1923) (8th street)	Siegmund Lubin (1851-1923) (8th street)	May 6, 1994	21 S 8th St., Philadelphia; 39.94979°N 75.15358°W	City	Business & Industry, Invention, Motion Pictures & Television, Professions & Vocations	Market East	
Sigma Sound Studios		October 15, 2015	In front of parking lot at 211-219 N 12th St. (across the st. from site), Philadelphia; 39.95639°N 75.15889°W	City	Music & Theater	Chinatown	
Sister Rosetta Tharpe (1915-1973)		October 24, 2011	1102 Master St., Philadelphia; 39.97377°N 75.15377°W	City	African American, Music & Theater, Performers, Religion, Women	North Philadelphia East (Yorktown)	
Smith Memorial Playground & Playhouse	Smith Memorial Playground & Playhouse	September 23, 2017	3500 Reservoir Dr., Philadelphia; 39.9828°N 75.19456°W	City	Buildings & Architecture, Sports & Recreation	Fairmount Park	
Solitude, The	Solitude, The	October 11, 2009	at site on Phila. Zoo grounds, 3400 W Girard Ave., Philadelphia; 39.97198°N 75.1957°W	City	Buildings & Architecture, William Penn	Fairmount Park	
South 9th Street Curb Market	South 9th Street Curb Market	October 12, 2007	NE corner of 9th & Christian Sts., Phila. 39.939°N 75.15778°W	Roadside	Business & Industry, Ethnic & Immigration, Roads	Bella Vista	
SPHAs Basketball Team, The		April 14, 2013	Broad & Wood Sts., Philadelphia; 39.95883°N 75.16232°W	Roadside	Basketball, Ethnic & Immigration, Sports & Recreation	Logan Square (Callowhill)	
St. Augustine's Roman Catholic Church	St. Augustine's Roman Catholic Church	October 28, 1995	235 N 4th St. at New St., Philadelphia; 39.95547°N 75.14617°W	City	Buildings & Architecture, Government & Politics, Government & Politics 19th Century, Religion	Old City	
St. John Neumann	St. John Neumann	March 28, 1981	St. Peter's Church, N 5th St. & Girard Ave., Philadelphia; 39.97013°N 75.14483°W	City	Religion	North Philadelphia East (Olde Kensington)	
St. John the Evangelist Roman Catholic Church		October 4, 2015	21 S 13th St (at Clover), Philadelphia; 39.95116°N 75.16157°W	Roadside	Artists, Music & Theater, Religion	Market East	
St. Mary Magdalen De Pazzi Parish	St. Mary Magdalen De Pazzi Parish	May 2, 1994	714 Montrose St., Philadelphia; 39.93757°N 75.15546°W	City	Buildings & Architecture, Ethnic & Immigration, Religion	Bella Vista	
St. Peter Claver Catholic Church	St. Peter Claver Catholic Church	1991	SW corner, S 12th & Lombard Sts., Philadelphia; 39.9442°N 75.16177°W	City	African American, Buildings & Architecture, Religion	Washington Square West	
St. Thomas' African Episcopal Church	St. Thomas' African Episcopal Church	September 30, 1984	SW corner, S 5th St. & St. James Ct., Philadelphia; 39.94654°N 75.14983°W	City	African American, Buildings & Architecture, Religion	Society Hill	
Standard Theatre	Standard Theatre	1992	South St. between 11th & 12th, Philadelphia; 39.94301°N 75.16098°W	City	African American, Buildings & Architecture, Entrepreneurs, Music & Theater, Performers	Washington Square West	
Stephen Decatur	Stephen Decatur	October 21, 1988	600 block of S Front St., Philadelphia; 39.94061°N 75.14409°W	City	Military, War of 1812	Queen Village	
Stephen Girard (1750-1831)	Stephen Girard (1750-1831)	October 1, 1993	Girard Park, Shunk Sts. between S 21st & S 22nd, Philadelphia; 39.91973°N 75.18333°W	Roadside	Buildings & Architecture, Business & Industry, Education, Ethnic & Immigration, Mansions & Manors, Professions & Vocations	South Philadelphia (Girard Estate)	
Stephen Smith (1795-1873)		June 19, 1991	1050 Belmont Ave., Philadelphia; 39.97267°N 75.21215°W	City	African American, Business & Industry, Coal, Professions & Vocations, Underground Railroad	Fairmount Park (Parkside)	
Sullivan Progress Plaza		September 14, 2016	1501 N Broad St., Philadelphia; 39.97652°N 75.15825°W	Roadside	African American, Business & Industry, Government & Politics 20th Century, Religion	North Philadelphia West (Cecil B. Moore)	
Terminal Commerce Building	Terminal Commerce Building	September 14, 2017	401 N Broad St., Philadelphia; 39.95979°N 75.16183°W	City	Buildings & Architecture, Railroads	Logan Square (Callowhill)	
Thaddeus Kosciuszko	Thaddeus Kosciuszko	October 22, 1967	NW corner, S 3rd & Pine Sts., Philadelphia; 39.94342°N 75.14731°W	City	American Revolution, Ethnic & Immigration, Military	Society Hill	
Thomas A. Edison High School and the Vietnam War		November 8, 2014	8th St. & Lehigh Ave., Philadelphia; 39.99272°N 75.14438°W	Roadside	Education, Government & Politics 20th Century, Military Post-Civil War	Upper North Philadelphia (Glenwood)	
Thomas E. Cahill (1828-1878)	Thomas E. Cahill (1828-1878)	September 29, 2009	E side of N Broad St., between Vine & Pearl, Philadelphia; 39.95829°N 75.16222°W	Roadside	Education, Entrepreneurs, Ethnic & Immigration, Religion	Logan Square (Callowhill)	
Thomas Eakins (1844-1916)	Thomas Eakins (1844-1916)	1996	1729 Mt. Vernon St., Philadelphia; 39.96531°N 75.16692°W	City	Artists, Science & Medicine, Sports & Recreation	North Philadelphia West (Spring Garden)	
Thomas Holme (1624-1695)	Thomas Holme (1624-1695)	July 29, 1995	Pennypack Park, 3000 Holme Ave., Philadelphia; 40.05671°N 75.02155°W	Roadside	Early Settlement, Government & Politics, Government & Politics 17th Century, William Penn	Northeast Philadelphia (Torresdale)	
Thomas Ustick Walter (1804-1877)	Thomas Ustick Walter (1804-1877)	October 29, 2009	1218 Arch St., Philadelphia; 39.95416°N 75.16043°W	City	Buildings & Architecture, Professions & Vocations	Chinatown	
Tindley Temple	Tindley Temple	1992	750-762 S Broad St. (PA 611), Philadelphia; 39.94155°N 75.16621°W	City	African American, Buildings & Architecture, Religion	Graduate Hospital	
Tomas Garrigue Masaryk (1850-1937)	Tomas Garrigue Masaryk (1850-1937)	July 23, 2002	Independence Mall West, S 6th St. between Chestnut and Samson, Philadelphia; 39.94865°N 75.15073°W	City	Ethnic & Immigration, Government & Politics, Government & Politics 20th Century	Independence Mall	
Tommy Loughran (1902-1982)	Tommy Loughran (1902-1982)	July 7, 2006	SW corner, S 17th & Ritner Sts., Philadelphia; 39.9211°N 75.17538°W	Roadside	Sports & Recreation	South Philadelphia (Girard Estate)	
Tun Tavern	Tun Tavern	November 11, 2005	Front St., between Chestnut & Walnut, Philadelphia; 39.94724°N 75.14252°W	City	American Revolution, Military, Inns & Taverns	Old City	
U.S.S. United States	U.S.S. United States	October 16, 1983	555 S Columbus Blvd. (S of Independence Seaport Museum, and near Delaware Ave. and Chart House restaurant), Philadelphia; 39.94145°N 75.14098°W	City	Military, War of 1812	Penn's Landing	
Union Fire Company (1736-1843)	Union Fire Company (1736-1843)	October 1, 2011	Market St., between 2nd & 3rd (Grindstone Alley); 39.95006°N 75.14453°W	City	Cities & Towns, Government & Politics 18th Century, Invention, Police and Safety	Old City	
Union League of Philadelphia	Union League of Philadelphia	February 12, 2004	SW corner, 140 S Broad St., Philadelphia; 39.94975°N 75.16406°W	City	Abraham Lincoln, Civil War, Government & Politics, Military	Rittenhouse Square	
Union Local 274, American Federation of Musicians	Union Local 274, American Federation of Musicians	1993	912 S. Broad St., Philadelphia; 39.93957°N 75.16655°W	City	African American, Labor, Music & Theater, Performers	Graduate Hospital	
Universal Negro Improvement Association	Universal Negro Improvement Association	April 11, 1992	1609-11 Cecil B. Moore Ave., Philadelphia; 39.97923°N 75.16146°W	City	African American	North Philadelphia West (Cecil B. Moore)	
US Sanitary Commission Great Central Fair	US Sanitary Commission Great Central Fair	June 16, 2012	Logan Sq., 19th & Ben Franklin Pkwy., near Swann Fountain, Philadelphia; 39.95744°N 75.17083°W	Roadside	Abraham Lincoln, Civil War, Government & Politics 19th Century, Military, Women	Logan Square	
Veterans Stadium	Veterans Stadium	September 28, 2005	NE corner, S Broad St. & Pattison Ave., Philadelphia; 39.90564°N 75.17377°W	Roadside	Baseball, Football, Sports & Recreation	South Philadelphia (Sports Complex)	
Vincent Persichetti (1915-1987)		May 9, 1997	Curtis Institute of Music, 1724 Locust St., Philadelphia; 39.94892°N 75.17055°W	City	Education, Music & Theater	Rittenhouse Square	
Violet Oakley (1874-1961)	Violet Oakley (1874-1961)	October 20, 1998	615 St. George's Rd., off McCallum St., Philadelphia; 40.05321°N 75.20386°W	City	Artists, Glass, Government & Politics, Women	Northwest Philadelphia (Mount Airy)	
W.C. Fields (1880-1948)	W.C. Fields (1880-1948)	October 13, 1997	NW corner, N 8th & Market Sts., Philadelphia; 39.95145°N 75.15382°W	City	Motion Pictures & Television, Performers	Market East	
W.E.B. Du Bois (1868-1963)	W.E.B. Du Bois (1868-1963)	October 29, 1995	NW corner, S 6th & Rodman Sts., Philadelphia; 39.94245°N 75.15224°W	City	African American, Civil Rights, Education, Writers	Society Hill	
Walnut Lane Bridge (Germantown side)	Walnut Lane Bridge (Germantown side)	October 18, 2008	Walnut Ln., NE side of bridge over Wissahickon Creek (Germantown side), Philadelphia; 40.03298°N 75.19912°W	Roadside	Bridges, Business & Industry, Transportation	Northwest Philadelphia (Germantown)	
Walnut Lane Bridge (Roxborough side)	Walnut Lane Bridge (Roxborough side)	October 18, 2008	Walnut Ln., SW side of bridge over Wissahickon Creek (Roxborough side), Philadelphia; 40.02136°N 75.19151°W	Roadside	Bridges, Business & Industry, Transportation	Northwest Philadelphia (Mount Airy)	
Walnut Street Prison	Walnut Street Prison	November 2008	SE corner, S 6th St. near Walnut St., Philadelphia; 39.94746°N 75.1514°W	City	Government & Politics, Government & Politics 18th Century	Independence Mall	
Walnut Street Theatre	Walnut Street Theatre	September 25, 1996	S 9th & Walnut Sts., Philadelphia; 39.94811°N 75.15559°W	City	Buildings & Architecture, Music & Theater, Performers	Washington Square West	
Walter Golaski (1913-1996)	Walter Golaski	May 17, 2014	On Drexel campus on Lancaster Walk, near Lancaster Ave. and 34th St. intersection, Philadelphia; 39.95721°N 75.19081°W	Roadside	Business & Industry, Ethnic & Immigration, Invention, Science & Medicine, Professions & Vocations	University City	
Washington Avenue Immigration Station	Washington Avenue Immigration Station	September 14, 1994	S Columbus Blvd. at Washington Ave., adjacent to US Coast Guard Station, Philadelphia; 39.93317°N 75.14328°W	City	Ethnic & Immigration	Penn's Landing	
Wesley A.M.E. Zion Church	Wesley AME Zion Church historical marker	October 24, 2020	1500 Lombard St., Philadelphia; 39.94488°N 75.16698°W	City	African American, Civil Rights, Religion	Rittenhouse Square	
Whitaker Mill Cedar Grove		May 27, 2006	5100 block of Tabor Rd. betw. E Olney Ave. & Garland St., Phila. 40.03125°N 75.11065°W	Roadside	Business & Industry, Mills	Upper North Philadelphia (Olney)	
William Allen (1704-1780)	William Allen (1704-1780)	September 26, 2009	7300 Germantown Ave., near Allen's Ln., at Lutheran Seminary; 40.06096°N 75.19151°W	Roadside		Northwest Philadelphia (Mount Airy)	
William Lewis (1751-1819)		October 19, 2013	Historic Strawberry Mansion, 2450 Strawberry Mansion Dr., Philadelphia; 39.99408°N 75.18932°W	Roadside	African American, Government & Politics 18th Century, Professions & Vocations	Fairmount Park	
William Penn - Slate Roof House	William Penn - Slate Roof House	November 1924	135 S. 2nd St.(SE corner 2nd & Sansom), Philadelphia; 39.94729°N 75.14406°W	Plaque	Buildings & Architecture, Government & Politics 17th Century, Houses & Homesteads, William Penn	Old City	Missing
William Penn Charter School	William Penn Charter School	October 23, 2015	Left side of main entrance, 3000 W Schoolhouse Ln., Philadelphia; 40.02212°N 75.18689°W	Roadside	African American, Education, Religion, William Penn, Women	Northwest Philadelphia (Germantown)	
William Still (1821-1902)	William Still (1821-1902)	July 3, 1991	244 S 12th St., Philadelphia; 39.94699°N 75.16101°W	City	African American, Coal, Underground Railroad	Washington Square West	
William Whipper (1804?-1876)	William Whipper (1804?-1876)	June 28, 1992	919 Lombard St., Philadelphia; 39.94366°N 75.15736°W	City	African American, Business & Industry, Underground Railroad, Writers	Washington Square West	
Wills Eye Hospital	Wills Eye Hospital	October 9, 2009	840 Walnut St., Philadelphia; 39.94811°N 75.15579°W	City	Education, Invention, Science & Medicine, Professions & Vocations	Washington Square West	
Wilt Chamberlain (1936-1999)	Wilt Chamberlain (1936-1999)	September 28, 2000	Overbrook High School, N 59th St. & Lancaster Ave., Philadelphia; 39.98113°N 75.23946°W	Roadside	Basketball, Sports & Recreation	West Philadelphia (Overbrook Park)	
Wissahickon Boys Club		2001	328 W Coulter St., Germantown, Philadelphia; 40.02698°N 75.17713°W	Roadside	African American	Northwest Philadelphia (Germantown)	
Wissahickon Inn	Wissahickon Inn	June 14, 1988	Springfield Ave. in front of inn, Chestnut Hill Academy, Philadelphia; 40.06208°N 75.20723°W	City	Buildings & Architecture, Business & Industry, Education, Inns & Taverns	Northwest Philadelphia (Chestnut Hill)	
Wistar Institute of Anatomy and Biology, The	Wistar Institute of Anatomy and Biology, The	November 14, 2007	3601 Spruce St. 39.950934°N 75.195485°W	City	Education, Invention, Science & Medicine	University City	
Women's Pa. Society for the Prevention of Cruelty to Animals		September 22, 2019	1320 Chestnut St., Philadelphia; 39.95064°N 75.16256°W	Roadside	Education, Invention, Science & Medicine, Women	Market East	
Wood Street Riverbank Steps		October 12, 2013	323 N Front St., between Vine & Callowhill Sts., Philadelphia; 39.95624°N 75.1401°W	City	Business & Industry, Government & Politics 18th Century, Transportation, William Penn	Old City	
Woodlands, The	Woodlands, The	December 28, 1996	4000 Woodland Ave., Philadelphia; 39.94907°N 75.20354°W	Roadside	Buildings & Architecture, Environment, Mansions & Manors	University City	
Wyoming Branch of the Free Library	Wyoming Branch of the Free Library	October 29, 2005	231 E Wyoming Ave., at "B" St., Philadelphia; 40.02116°N 75.12067°W	City	Buildings & Architecture, Business & Industry, Education	Upper North Philadelphia (Feltonville)	MISSING as of 10/10/2026

== See also ==
- List of Pennsylvania state historical markers
- National Register of Historic Places listings in Philadelphia, Pennsylvania
- List of National Historic Landmarks in Philadelphia
