= Brancato =

Brancato is a surname. It may refer to:

- Al Brancato (1919–2012), American baseball player
- Anthony Brancato (1914–1951), American criminal
- Chris Brancato (born 1962), American screenwriter and producer
- George Brancato (1931–2019), American football player and coach
- Jasper Brancato, American politician
- John Brancato, American screenwriter
- Lillo Brancato (born 1976), American actor
- Anne Brancato Wood (1903–1972), American politician

The name is believed to originate from a word from the Sicilian dialect of Italian meaning white poplar, also known as abele; a vastly inordinate number of the bearers of this surname are specifically of Sicilian origin, as reported by Joseph Fucilla in his 1949 book Our Italian Surnames.
