= John Fanning Watson =

American antiquarian and amateur historian

- Born: June 13, 1779; Batsto Village, New Jersey
- Died: December 23, 1860 (aged 81); Philadelphia, Pennsylvania
- Writing career
- Genre: history
- Notable work: Annals of Philadelphia

John Fanning Watson (June 13, 1779 - December 23, 1860) was a Philadelphia antiquarian, a chronicler and a historian who became a professional writer. In 1830, he authored Annals of Philadelphia.

== Biography ==
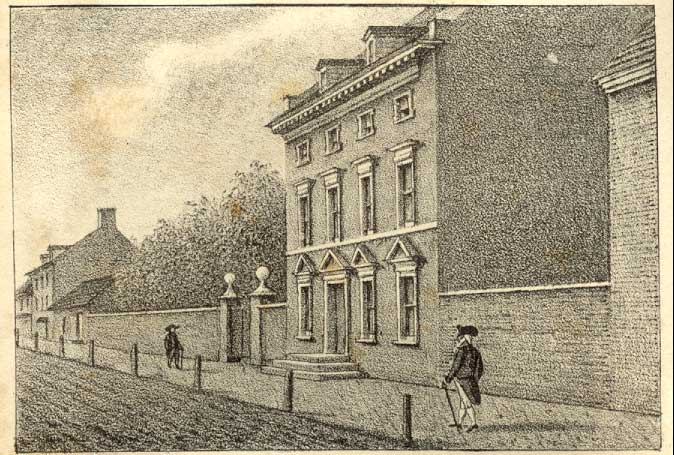
Washington's Residence, High Street, a lithograph by William L. Breton, from the 1830 edition of Annals of Philadelphia

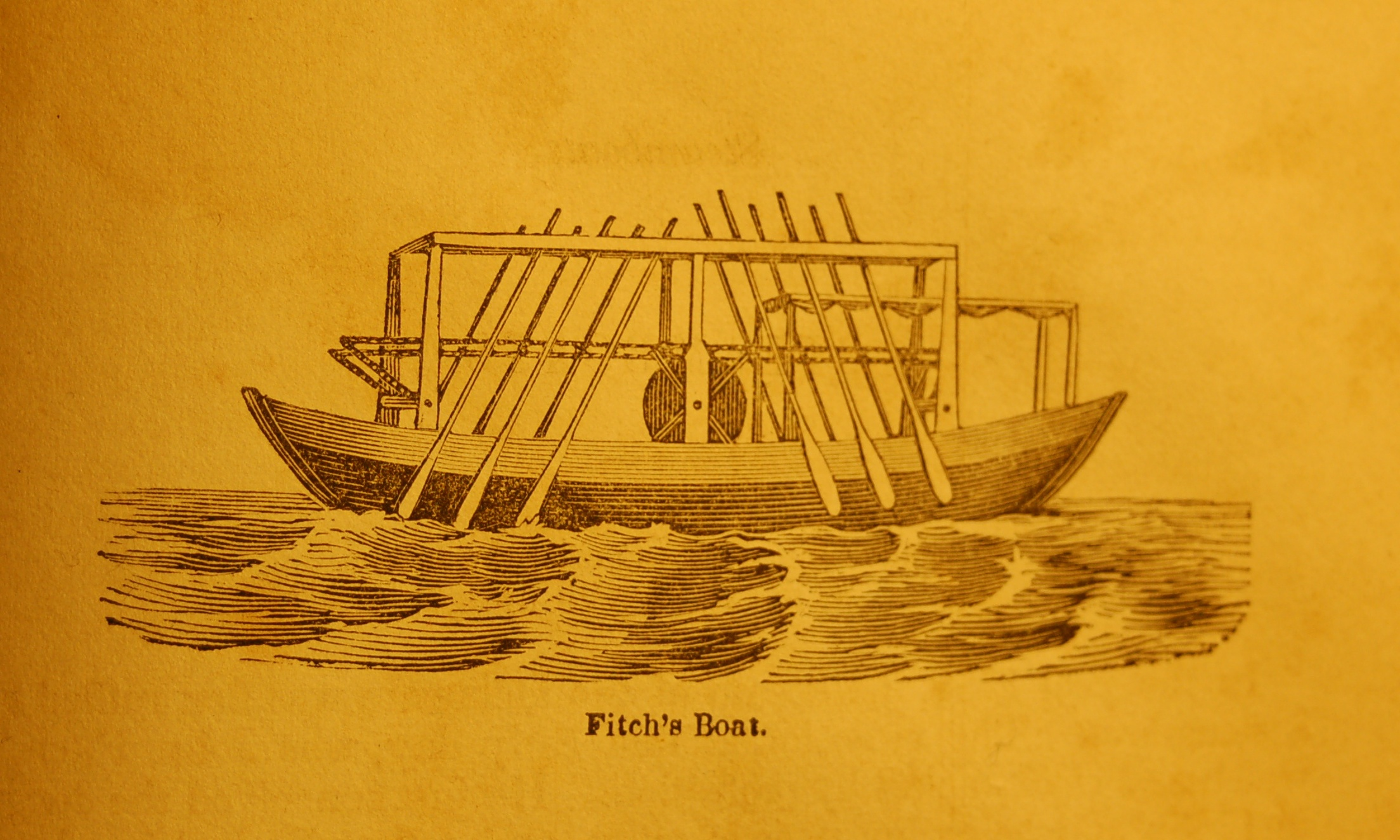
"Fitch's Boat". Woodcut of John Fitch's 1787 oar-propelled steamboat, from 1844 edition of Annals of Philadelphia.

A bookseller, then a bank cashier by trade, he worked for the Germantown Bank, and Philadelphia, Germantown and Norristown Railroad.

As a young man he began gathering the reminiscences of elderly people, and collected them in the first major history of the city. Annals of Philadelphia was published in 1830, with expanded editions in 1844 (two volumes) and 1857. A third volume by Willis P. Hazard was added in 1879, and the set continued to be published into the early 20th century.

Watson hired a British immigrant, William L. Breton, to illustrate the 1830 Annals. Based on Watson's own sketches, Breton's lithographed illustrations included the first published images of George Washington's President's House (demolished two years later), of the State House Tavern opposite Independence Hall, and of a slave auction at the London Coffee House. Later editions of the Annals copied these lithographs as woodcuts, and then engravings.

A scrapbook of Watson's notes for the 1830 Annals is housed at the Library Company of Philadelphia. It includes such curiosities as squares of fabric cut from dresses worn by Philadelphia ladies at the "Mesquianza", an elaborate May 1778 pageant and ball hosted by British officers during the Revolutionary War occupation of the city.

He also published Historic Tales of Olden Time of New York City and State (New York, 1832), Historic Tales of Olden Time of Philadelphia and Pennsylvania (Philadelphia, 1833), and Annals and Occurrences of New York City and State (New York, 1846), among others.

He was a passionate advocate for preserving historic buildings. He urged the preservation of the Slate Roof House, a 1687 building that had housed Pennsylvania's founder, William Penn from 1699 to 1701, and served as the government offices for the Colony from 1699 to 1704. That fight was lost, but the shock of the building's 1867 demolition — after Watson's death — helped spark a historic preservation movement in Philadelphia.

While Watson is readable, he is not always reliable, and his carelessness about citing sources is a frustration to scholars.

Still, it is because of him that we have the first-person accounts of people such as "Black Alice", an enslaved African woman reputedly born in Philadelphia 1686, who lived to age 116, and claimed to remember William Penn.

== Bibliography ==
- Benjamin Dorr, Memoir of John Fanning Watson (Philadelphia, 1861).
- Joseph Jackson, "John Fanning Watson," Encyclopedia of Philadelphia (Harrisburg, PA: 1931), pp. 1175–77.
- Deborah Dependahl Waters, "Philadelphia's Boswell: John Fanning Watson," Pennsylvania Magazine of History and Biography 98, (January 1974), pp. 3–52.
