= Thomas Bond House =

Historic house in Pennsylvania, United States

- U.S. National Register of Historic Places
- U.S. Historic district – Contributing property
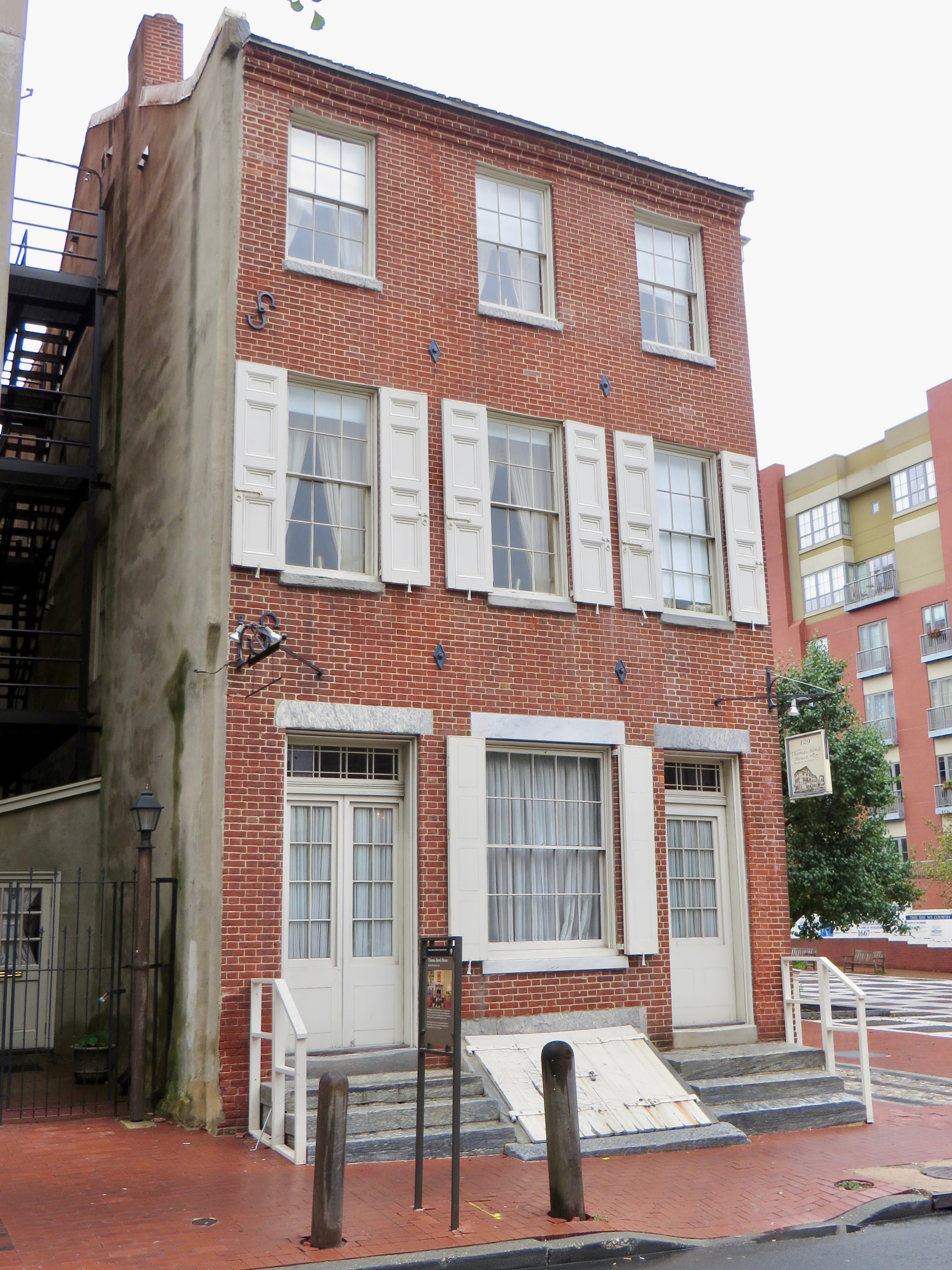
- Thomas Bond House

- Location within Philadelphia Location within Pennsylvania Location within the United States
- Location: 129 South 2nd Street, Philadelphia, Pennsylvania 19104
- Coordinates: 39.947504°N 75.144099°W
- Built: 1769
- Architectural style: Georgian Architecture
- Part of: Old City Historic District
- NRHP reference No.: 66000683

The Thomas Bond House is located at 129 South Second Street in Old City, Philadelphia, Pennsylvania. Originally built in 1769, as the home of Dr. Thomas Bond, it has since been restored into a bed and breakfast.

The house was listed on the Philadelphia Register of Historic Places in 1968 and is within the Old City Historic District, a district on the National Register of Historic Places. It is part of Independence National Historical Park and is 3 blocks east of Independence Hall. The main entrance faces south towards Welcome Park, the former location of William Penn's Slate Roof House.

== History ==
The history of the Bond house reflects the economic history of this part of Philadelphia. The central core of the Bond house was built in 1769 by Dr. Thomas Bond Sr., a prominent physician and founder of Pennsylvania Hospital, which was chartered in 1751. In 1824, a four-foot extension with a new facade was added to the west side, and in the 1830s to 1840s, the building was extended eastward at the rear.

In 1988, the property was leased to a private business by Independence Historical National Park in order to facilitate restoration of the building. As a result, it was converted into a bed and breakfast.

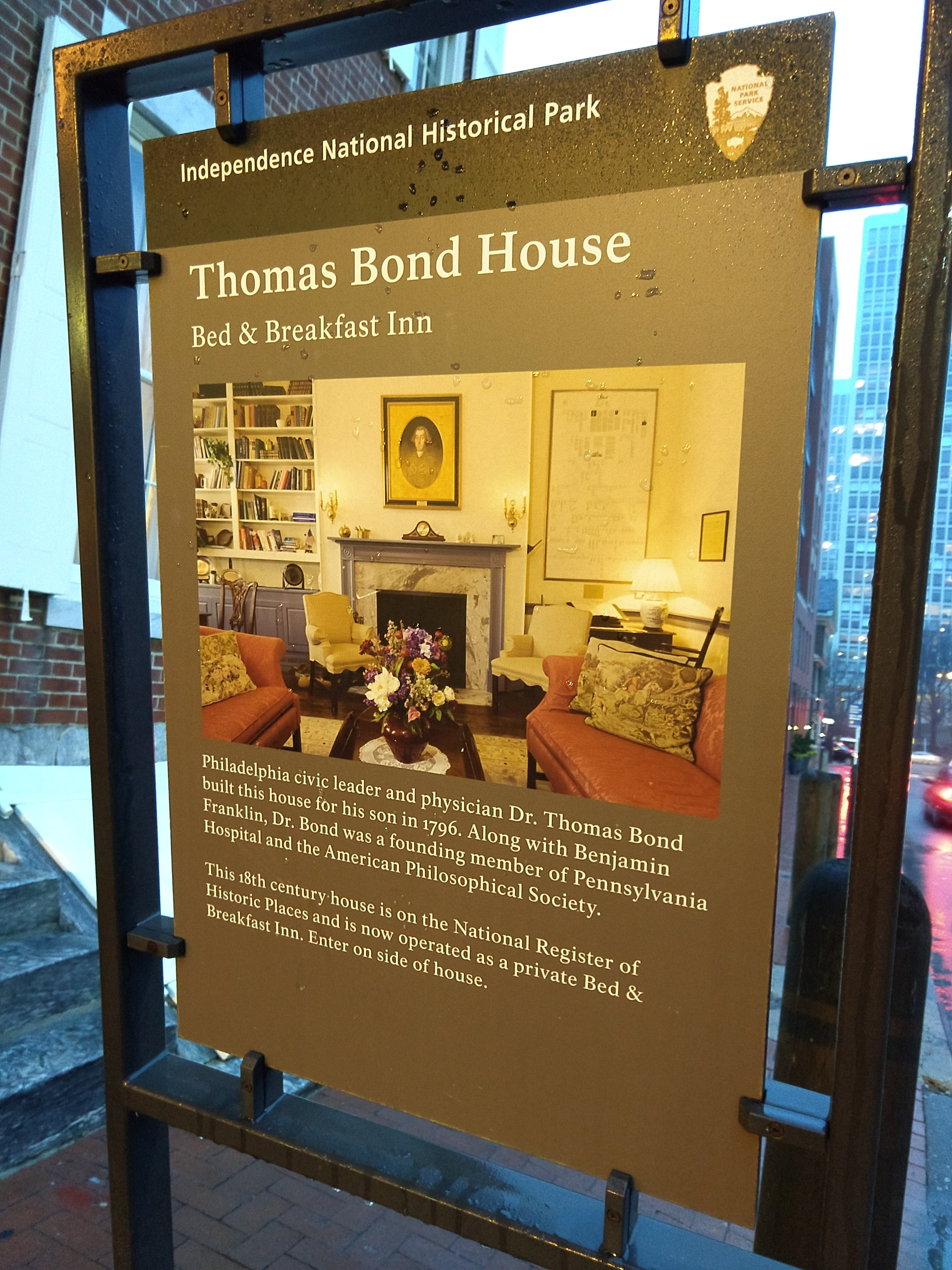
Independence National Historical Park Sign

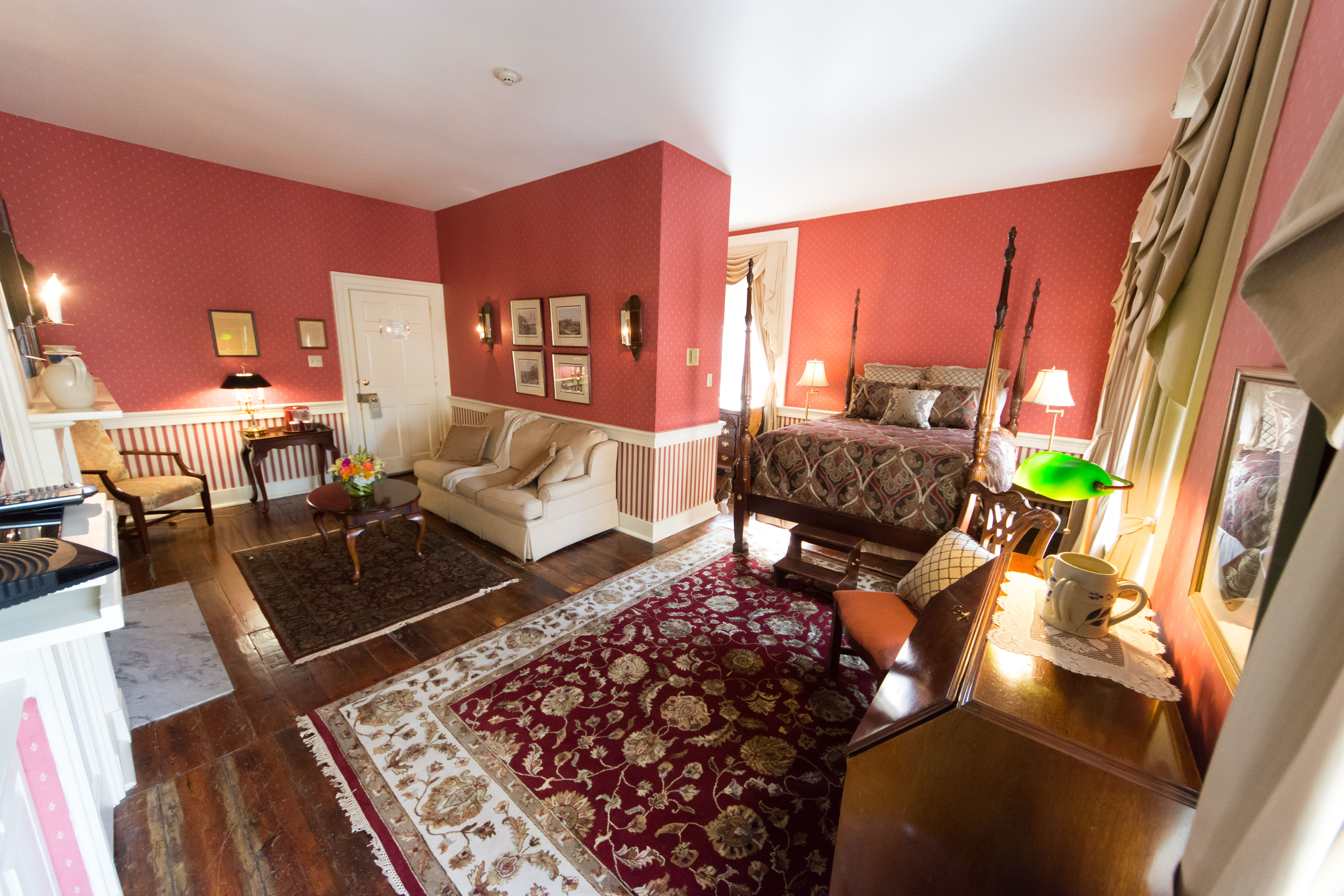
Dr Thomas Bond Jr Room
