= Land Title Building =

- U.S. National Register of Historic Places
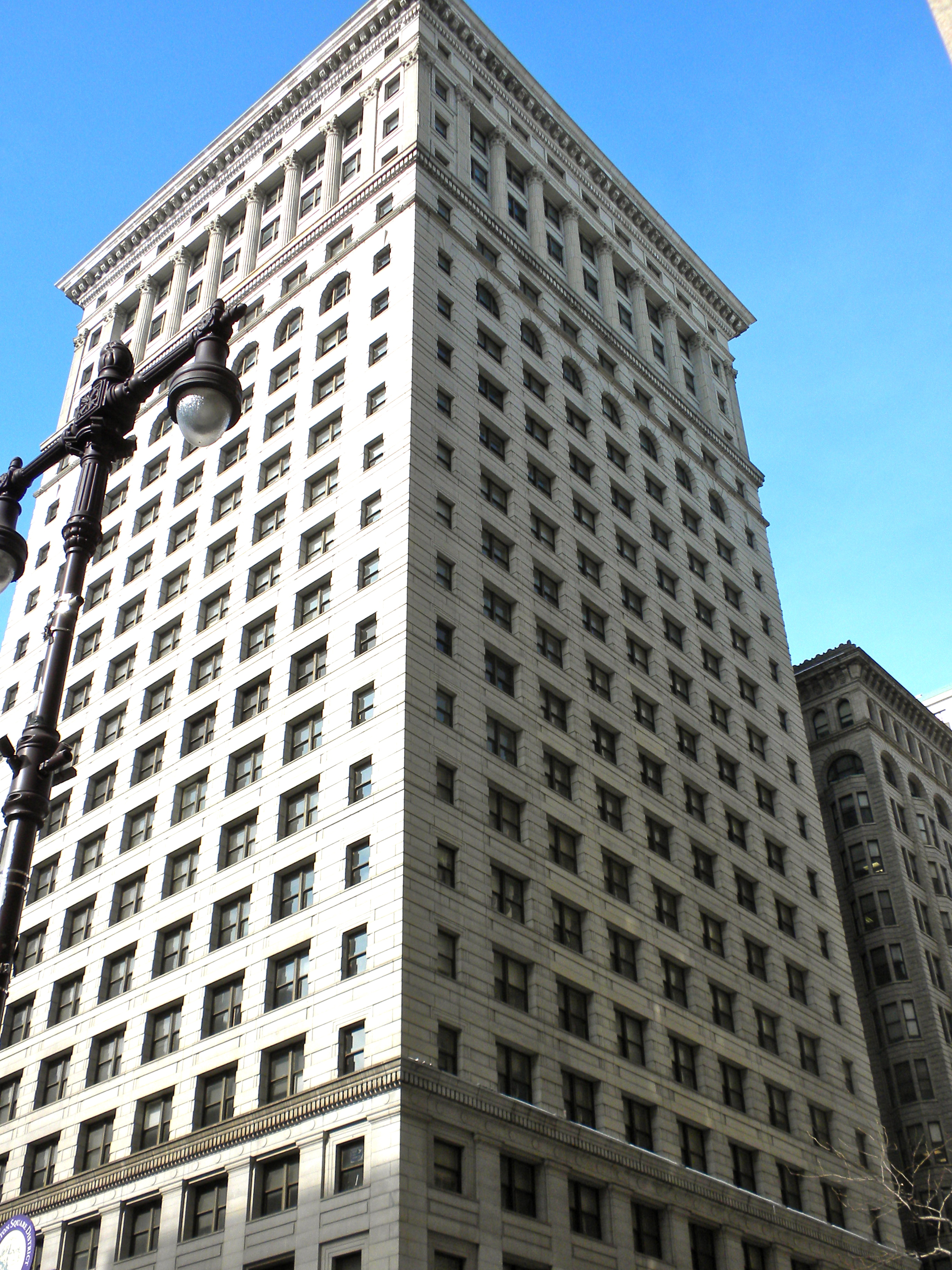

- Location within Philadelphia Location within Pennsylvania Location within the United States
- Location: 100 S Broad Street, Philadelphia, Pennsylvania
- Coordinates: 39°57′2″N 75°9′52″W
- Area: 0.2 acres (0.081 ha)
- Built: 1898
- Architect: Daniel H. Burnham & Co.; Daniel H. Burnham & Horace Trumbauer
- Architectural style: Chicago, Classical Revival
- NRHP reference No.: 78002450
- Added to NRHP: December 15, 1978

The Land Title Building and Annex is an American early skyscraper located at 100 S Broad Street in Philadelphia, Pennsylvania. The building was listed on the National Register of Historic Places in 1978.

== History and architectural features ==
This historic structure was built for the oldest title insurance company in the world, the Land Title Bank and Trust Company. The two-building complex, joined at the first floor, was built in two phases. The earlier, northern one of the building's two towers was erected in 1898 and was fifteen stories tall. It was designed by Chicago-based architect Daniel Burnham, who was an early pioneer in the development of tall buildings.

The southern, 22-story, 331-foot tower, added in 1902, was also designed by Burnham in collaboration with Philadelphia architect Horace Trumbauer; it was built on the site of the former Lafayette Hotel.

A Pennsylvania Historical and Museum Commission historical marker outside the building commemorates Anne Brancato Wood, a state legislator and entrepreneur whose offices were located in the building.
