= Bethel Burial Ground =

Historic African American cemetery in Pennsylvania

- U.S. National Register of Historic Places
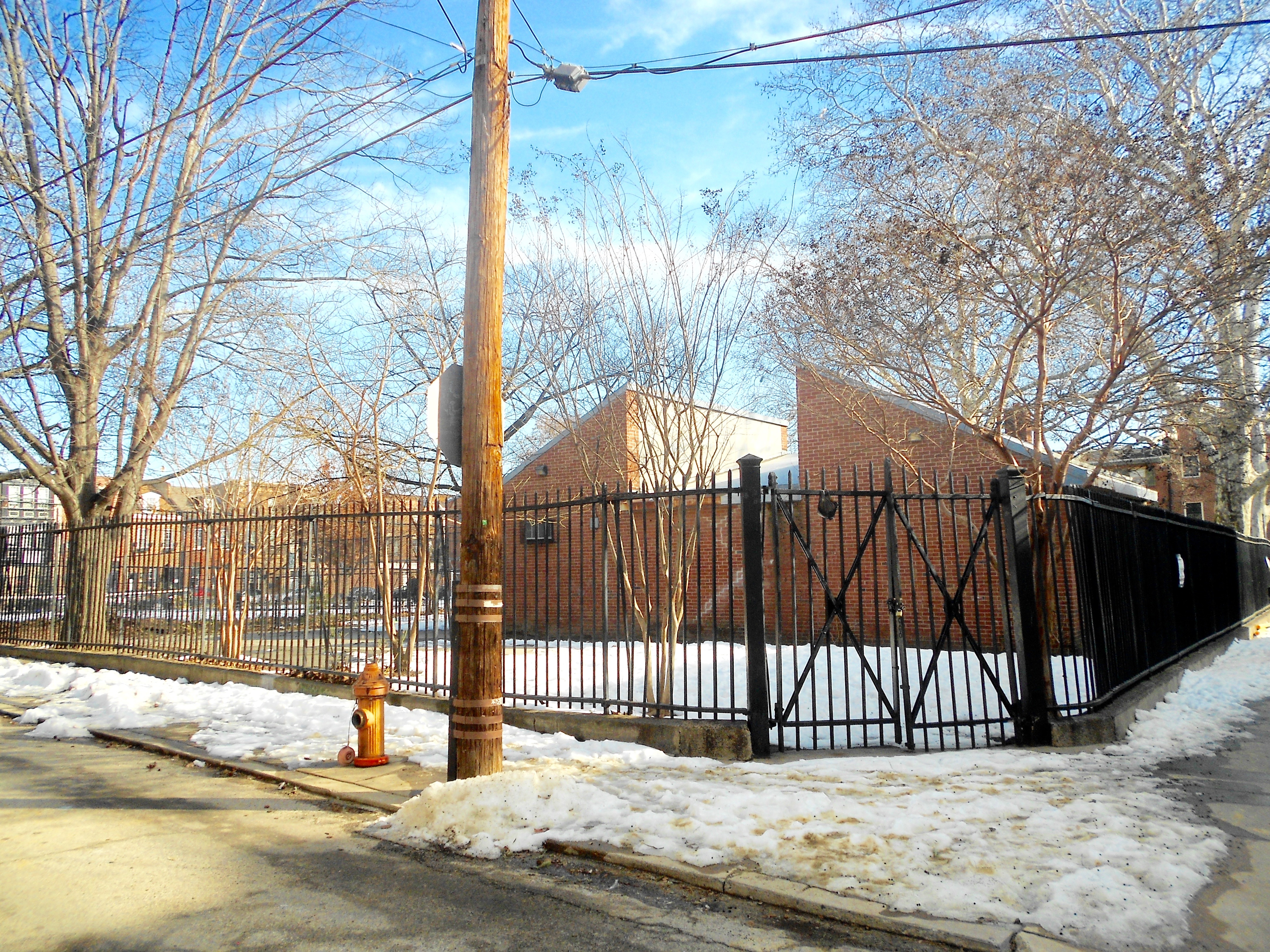
- Southwest corner of Weccacoe Playground, which covers the burial ground

- Location within Philadelphia Location within Pennsylvania Location within the United States
- Location: 415 Queen St., Philadelphia, Pennsylvania
- Coordinates: 39°56′16″N 75°9′3″W
- Area: 0.28 acres (0.11 ha)
- Built: 1810
- NRHP reference No.: 15000734
- Added to NRHP: January 6, 2016

Bethel Burial Ground is a historic African American cemetery located in South Philadelphia, Pennsylvania, beneath part of the surface of Weccacoe Playground, which is bounded by Queen, S. Lawrence, Catherine, and S. Liethgow Streets. The burial ground was about 100 feet square and is located below the southwest corner of the current playground.

== History ==
Burials began in 1810 after the land was bought by the Rev. Richard Allen for Mother Bethel A.M.E. Church, located about half a mile north, to be a resting place for African Americans. Bills of mortality and death certificates document 1,716 burials on the 0.28 acres (0.11 ha) site before 1830.

Large amounts of fill were used on the site to accommodate burials after 1842, in effect stacking graves on top of earlier graves. Estimates of the total burials range from 3,000 - 5,000. Burials ended in 1864 and the site was neglected. From 1869-1873 the lot was used for storage of wagons and other equipment by a sugar refiner and was further degraded. Bethel Church sold the property in 1889. By 1900 it had been transformed into a park, then known a Weccacoe Square.

A preliminary excavation has firmly established the extent of the cemetery, found evidence of many grave shafts, and of layers of fill, and one gravestone reading "Amelia Brown, 1819, Aged 26 years - Whosoever live and believeth in me, though we [sic] be dead, yet shall we [sic] live."

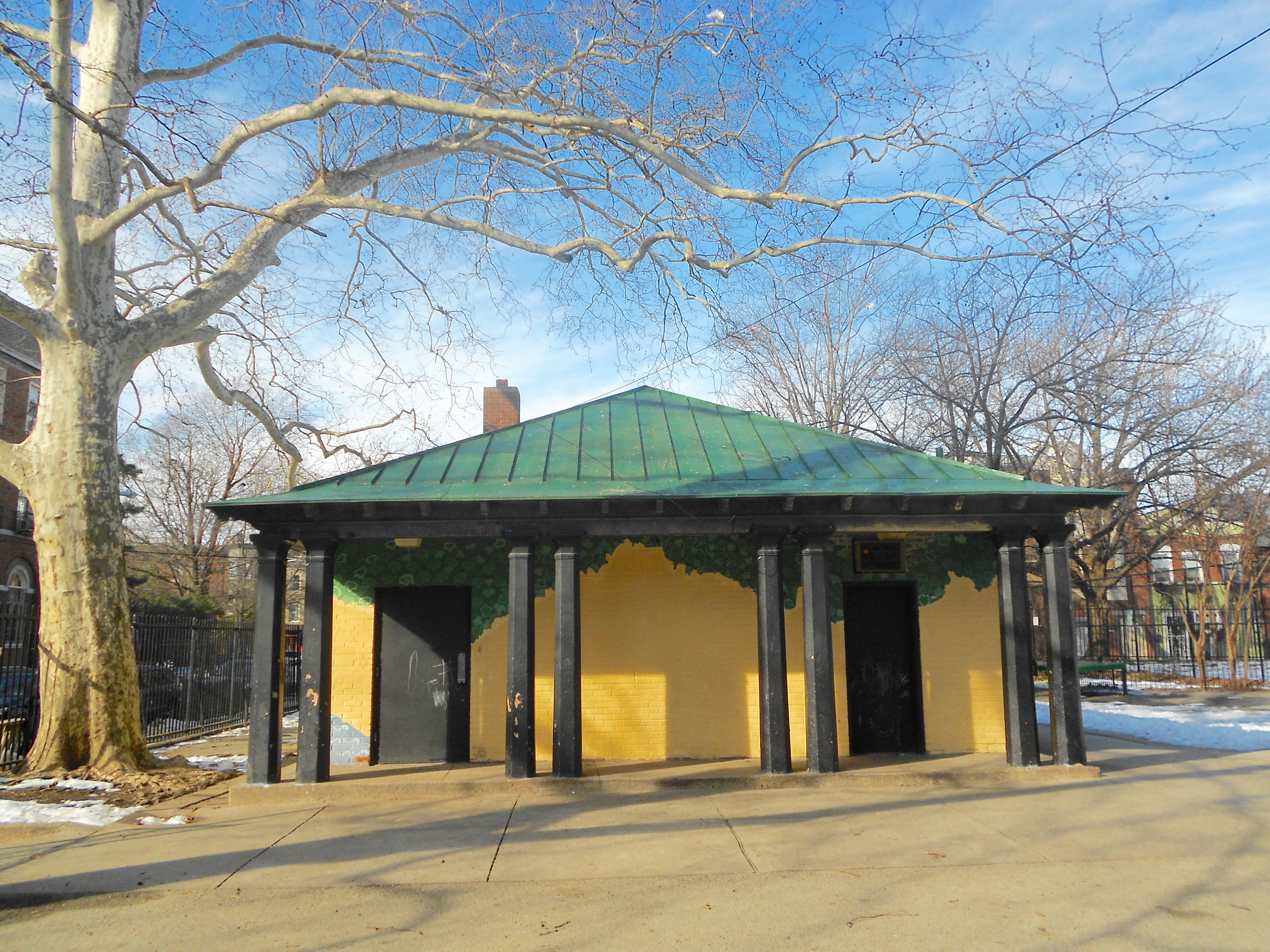
Park pavilion, looking west. The burial ground lies behind the pavilion

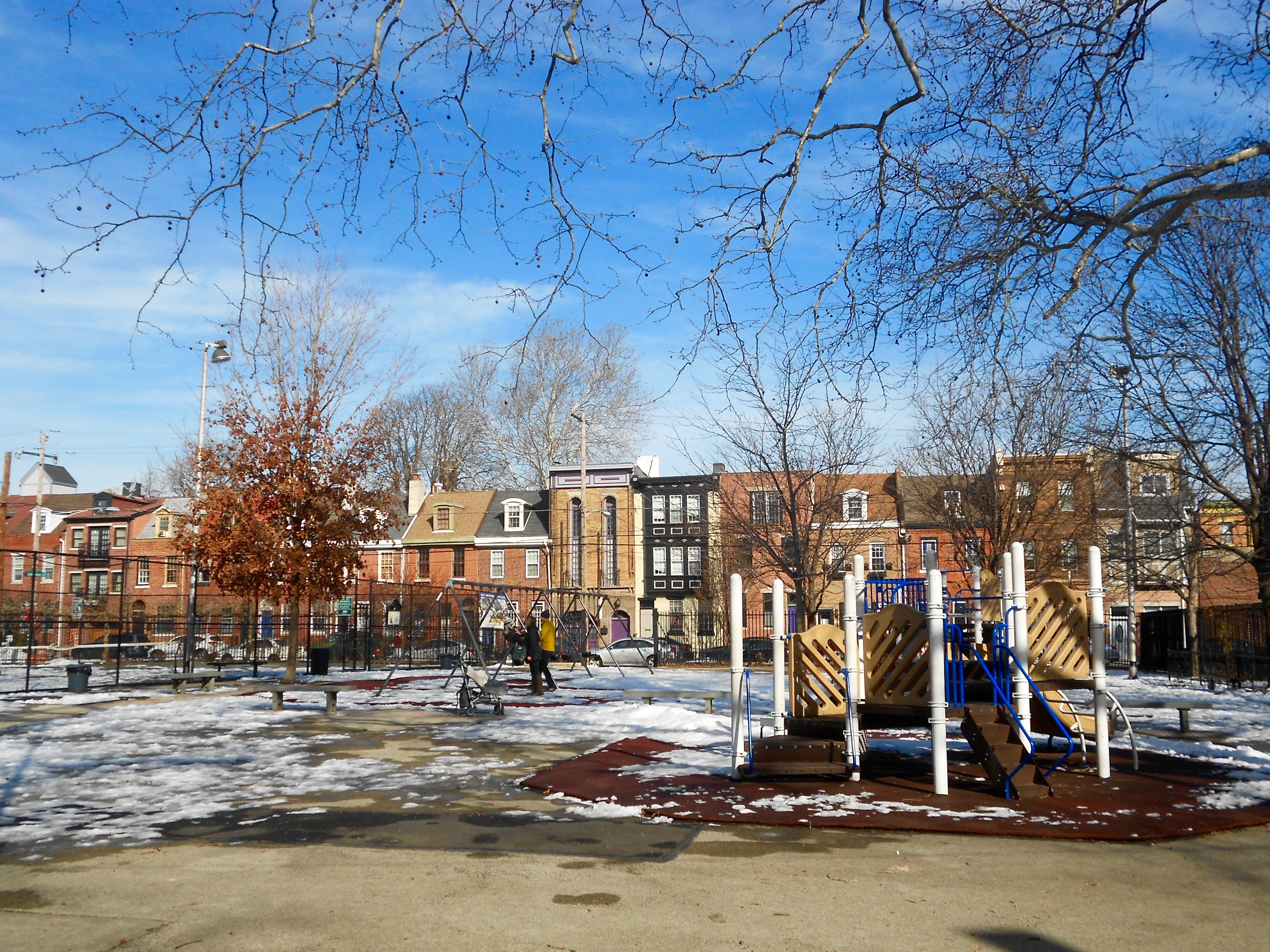
East side of Weccacoe Playground, looking north

== Weccacoe Playground ==
Weccacoe Playground, located on the 400 block of Catharine Street, features a playground that dates back to 1910. Part of the park was built over the Bethel Burial Ground. The park includes a recreation center, a tennis court, a playground and water play area.
