= Anne Brancato Wood =

American politician (1903–1972)

Member of the Pennsylvania House of Representatives from the 5th District
- In office 1933–1940
- In office 1945–1946

Personal details
- Born: Anne M. Brancato; January 17, 1903 Philadelphia, U.S.
- Died: August 22, 1972 (aged 69) Lower Merion Township, Pennsylvania, U.S.
- Resting place: Holy Cross Cemetery
- Party: Democratic Party
- Education: Temple University, Banks Business College

Anne M. Brancato Wood (née Brancato; January 17, 1903 – August 22, 1972) was an American politician who in 1932 became the first woman to be elected to the Pennsylvania House of Representatives as a Democrat. A New Deal liberal from Philadelphia and only the second Italian American to serve in the state legislature, she served five terms in the Pennsylvania House (1933, 1935, 1937, 1939, and 1945) and became the first woman to serve as Speaker Pro Tempore of the Pennsylvania House of Representatives in 1935. The Pennsylvania Historical and Museum Commission dedicated a state historical marker to her in 1994.

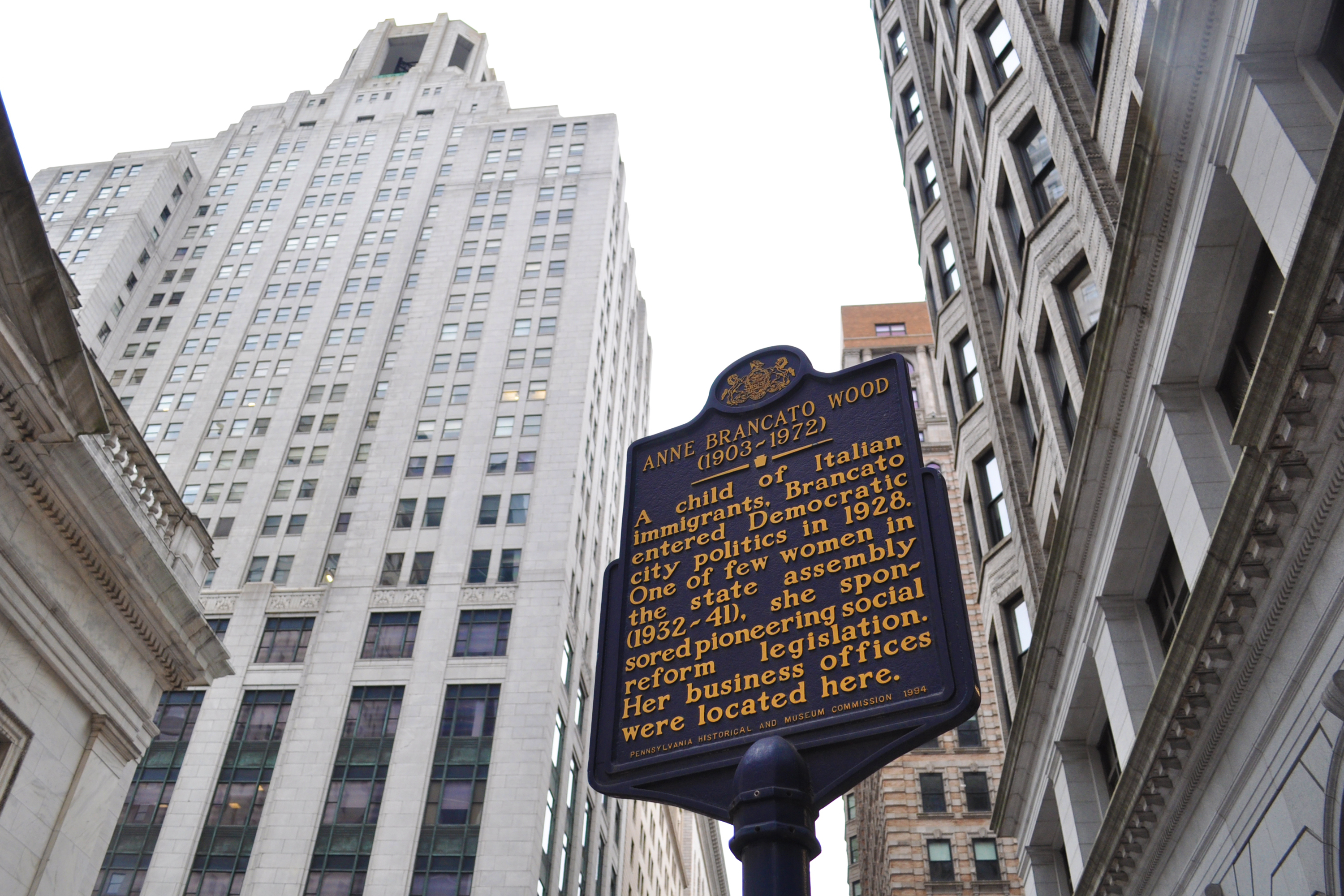
Anne Brancato Wood state historical marker located on 1400 Chestnut Street, Philadelphia

== Early life ==
Born Anne M. Brancato to Italian immigrant parents in Philadelphia on January 17, 1903, she grew up speaking English, Italian, and Hebrew in her multi-ethnic neighborhood. Brancato graduated high school from the Academy of the Sisters of Mercy and attended Banks Business College and Temple University, where she studied languages such as French and Japanese, though she never completed a college degree.

Brancato worked as an advertising manager and photographer's assistant for a local newspaper called Spector and became involved in local Democratic Party politics starting in 1928. She served as chair and president of the Women's Democratic Club of South Philadelphia before running for office in 1932.

== Political career ==
As a 29-year-old unmarried Italian American woman running in a district dominated by Philadelphia's Republican political machine, Brancato was a long-shot candidate. She walked door-to-door in Philadelphia's fifth district distributing campaign literature and delivered speeches in fluent Italian from the backs of flatbed trucks. One of a wave of Democrats elected to the state assembly that year on Franklin Delano Roosevelt's coattails, she defeated Republican nominee Joseph Argentieri by fifteen hundred votes, becoming the first woman to serve in the Pennsylvania House of Representatives as a Democrat. Brancato also broke new ground by becoming only the second Italian American—and the first Roman Catholic of Italian descent—to serve in the House.

Brancato swiftly established a progressive record in the House, championing an array of social welfare and poverty relief laws to protect her most vulnerable constituents. In March 1933, in the midst of the Great Depression, she introduced an anti-eviction bill to protect homeowners and renters from eviction if they were unable to find a job. The bill passed the House but failed in the Senate. She introduced or sponsored bills such as the Pawnbrokers' Act (cracking down on loan sharks), the Hasty Marriage Act (requiring a three-day waiting period between obtaining a marriage license and getting married), the Mothers' Assistance Fund Law (to support poor mothers), and the Minimum Wage and Hour Law for Women, along with bills to protect women's property rights, build playgrounds in crowded urban neighborhoods, and ban the word illegitimate from the birth certificates of children born out of wedlock. She also fought successfully to give Philadelphia police officers and firefighters one day off a week.

Brancato served four consecutive terms in the House (1933, 1935, 1937, 1939) and became the first woman to serve as Speaker Pro Tempore of the House in 1935. She served on the Joint Legislative Committee to Investigate Governmental Costs of Philadelphia (1937–1938). Brancato lost her 1940 primary election to future Philadelphia council president Paul D'Ortona. Reelected in 1944, she served a fifth and final term in office. She went on to run unsuccessfully as the Democratic nominee for Pennsylvania State Senate in 1956 and work as assistant secretary of the House from 1969 to 1972.

Brancato worked as a real estate and insurance broker and in 1946 established a telephone answering and secretarial service. Her offices were located in the Land Title Building, outside which the Pennsylvania Historical and Museum Commission erected a commemorative marker on June 17, 1994.

== Personal life ==
During the mid-1940s, Brancato married Philadelphia businessman Augustus Wood and took the name Anne Brancato Wood. She suffered from chronic laryngitis during the last fifteen years of her life, weakening her ability to speak. Despite her ailment, she remained active in a wide range of civic organizations, including the Navy League of the United States, the Pennsylvania Constitution Commemoration Committee, the Alliance of Catholic Women, the Philadelphia Civic Center, the Philadelphia Housing Authority, Saint Bernadette's Home for the Aged and Convalescent, the Ladies of Charity, the Pan American Association, the Youth Study Center, and More Women on the Ballot (a group she formed to elect more women to office).

Brancato died on August 22, 1972, at a hospital in Lower Merion Township after a brief illness. Her remains were interred at the Holy Cross Cemetery in Yeadon, Pennsylvania. Her papers are held at the Smithsonian Institution and the Pennsylvania State Archives.
