= Jasper Brancato =

American politician

Jasper M. Brancato

Member of the Missouri Senate from the 11th district
- In office 1956–1972

Personal details
- Born: November 26, 1907 Kansas City, Missouri
- Died: March 18, 1976 (aged 68) Jefferson City, Missouri
- Party: Democratic
- Spouse: Zaira Follina
- Children: 1 daughter
- Education: Kansas City School of Law
- Occupation: Politician, lawyer, real estate investor

Jasper M. Brancato (November 26, 1907 – March 18, 1976) was an American politician who served in the Missouri Senate. He served in the U.S. Army in the quartermaster corps during World War II.
