= Olde Kensington, Philadelphia =

Olde Kensington
- Neighborhood of Philadelphia
- Location within Philadelphia
- Country: United States
- State: Pennsylvania
- County: Philadelphia
- City: Philadelphia
- Area codes: 215, 267 and 445

Olde Kensington, also known as South Kensington, is a neighborhood located in North Philadelphia section of Philadelphia, Pennsylvania, United States. South Kensington is north of Northern Liberties, south of Norris Square, east of Ludlow, and west of Fishtown. The boundaries of the neighborhood are Berks St. (north), Girard Ave (south), Front St (east) and 6th St. (west).

After World War II, many neighborhoods in Philadelphia experienced a long period of decline, deindustrialization, and residential abandonment. In recent years, however, South Kensington has been increasingly gentrified, following a similar pattern observed in adjacent Northern Liberties and Fishtown. Although some industrial activity has continued along the American Street corridor, a historic location for heavy industry, a growing number of formerly vacant factories are being turned into lofts, condos, and artist workspaces.

The zip code for the area is 19122. There are two associations that serve the neighborhood: South Kensington Community Partners (SKCP) and Olde Kensington Neighbors Association (OKNA).

== Population ==
As of 2021, Olde Kensington was 57% non Hispanic white, 25% Hispanic, 8% non Hispanic black, 7% Asian, and 3% other. Median household income is $117,904.

== Public Transportation ==
SEPTA provides various options of public transportation for the neighborhood, and Center City is about 2 miles or 10 minutes away. The neighborhood is served by:

Buses 57, 5 Elevated Train (the EL) at Girard Station Trolley 15 through Girard Ave

Also, buses 3 and 47 pass nearby the neighborhood, and the EL Berks Station and SEPTA rail at Temple University Station are within reasonable walking distance.

Additionally, many residents ride their bicycles as their preferred mode of transportation. Indego Philly has a bike share station at 3rd & Girard and multiple peripheral stations: 2nd & Germantown Ave, 1176 Leopard Ave. (Girard Station, MFL), 1424 Frankford Ave. (City Fitness), 1902 N. Front St. (Berks Station, MFL), and 527 W. Berks St.

PhillyCarShare (now known as Enterprise CarShare) vehicles are available at 6th & Girard Ave, 100 W. Oxford St. and Frankford & Thompson St. Zipcars are located at Front & Master, Frankford & Master, Frankford & Palmer, and 6th & Girard.

== Locally owned businesses ==
Olde Kensington has experienced an increase in locally owned businesses in the 2020s, reflecting the neighborhood’s broader redevelopment. In 2024, Sacred Vice Brewing opened a taproom in the area. The following year saw the openings of Kensington Powerlifting, a strength training and powerlifting gym, and BUBS, a café and community space centered on board games. That same year, Sarang Head Spa was recognized by *Philadelphia Magazine* for its scalp facial treatment. These additions join other local establishments such as breweries, art studios, and cafés noted in earlier neighborhood guides.
