= Slate Roof House =

Coordinates: 39.94727°N 75.14412°W

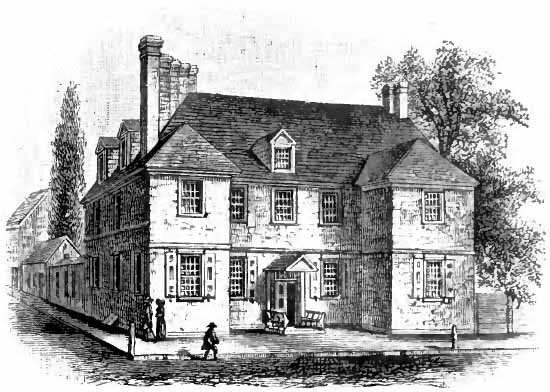
William Penn's house, also known as the Slate Roof House, in a conjectural drawing from Appletons' Cyclopædia of American Biography in 1888

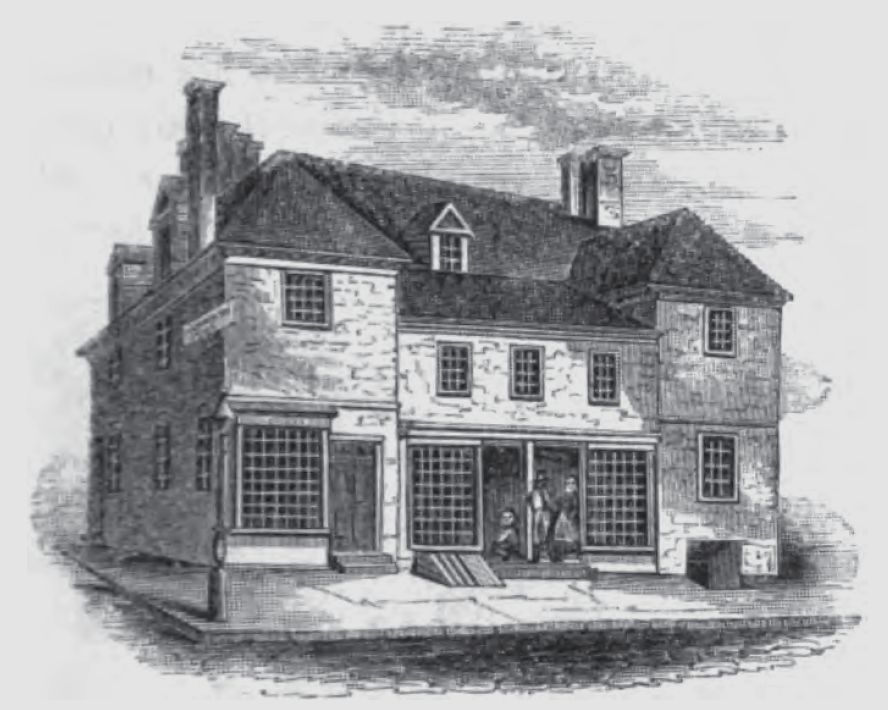
An 1850 sketch showing an addition between the two wings being used as a storefront. The artist noted the building's dilapidated state and correctly guessed it would be razed.

The Slate Roof House was a mansion that stood on 2nd Street north of Walnut Street in Philadelphia, Pennsylvania, from about 1687 until its demolition in 1867. Built for Barbadian Quaker merchant Samuel Carpenter, the house occupied a small hill overlooking the Delaware River. It was built of brick in the Jacobean style with its façade featuring two projecting wings that flanked a recessed central entrance. The house was notable for its large size as well for its slate roof, which was a rarity in early Philadelphia.

== History ==
For two years (1699-1701), during his second visit to America, William Penn rented the house for use as a city residence while maintaining his country house at Pennsbury Manor in Bucks County, Pennsylvania. It was at the Slate Roof House that he wrote and issued his "Charter of Privileges," a progressive framework for Pennsylvania’s government that became the model for the United States Constitution and is still the basis of free governments all over the world.

James Logan, the secretary of the Proprietary after Penn returned to England, later lived in the Slate Roof House. He administered the colony of Pennsylvania from there between 1701 and 1704.

In later years, the house was the temporary abode of John Adams, John Hancock, and many other distinguished members of the First Continental Congress, and also of Baron Johann de Kalb, who fell, fighting for American independence, at the Battle of Camden. It was the death site for General Charles Lee and for General John Forbes, second in command, and afterwards successor to General Edward Braddock.

The Slate Roof House was altered for commercial use in the 18th century and became dilapidated during the 1800s. Despite protests from historians, the house was razed in 1867. It was replaced by a large Victorian commercial structure that stood until 1976.

== Modern site ==
In 1982, an urban courtyard called Welcome Park was built on the site, managed by Independence National Historical Park. The park features William Penn’s plan of the city of Philadelphia laid out in slate and marble, as well as a bronze model of the house. A miniature version of the statue of Penn by Alexander Milne Calder that crowns Philadelphia City Hall stands on a pedestal in the center. The park also features a timeline of Penn’s life on the enclosing wall. Welcome Park was named after Penn's ship, Welcome, which brought Penn and over one hundred passengers, mostly Quakers, to America in 1682.

The National Park Service proposed renovation of the park in a 2024 preliminary draft that included removal of the Penn statue. The renovation plan is under review.

The park is adjacent to the Thomas Bond House.

== See also ==
- Athenaeum of Philadelphia
- Letitia Street House
- Pennsbury Manor

== Sources ==
- Watson's Annals of Philadelphia and Pennsylvania, 1857
- Harry Kyriakodis, Philadelphia's Lost Waterfront (The History Press, 2011), at 91, 99.
- Frommer's Philadelphia Walking Tour
