= Free Quaker Meetinghouse =

Historic church in Pennsylvania, United States

- U.S. National Register of Historic Places
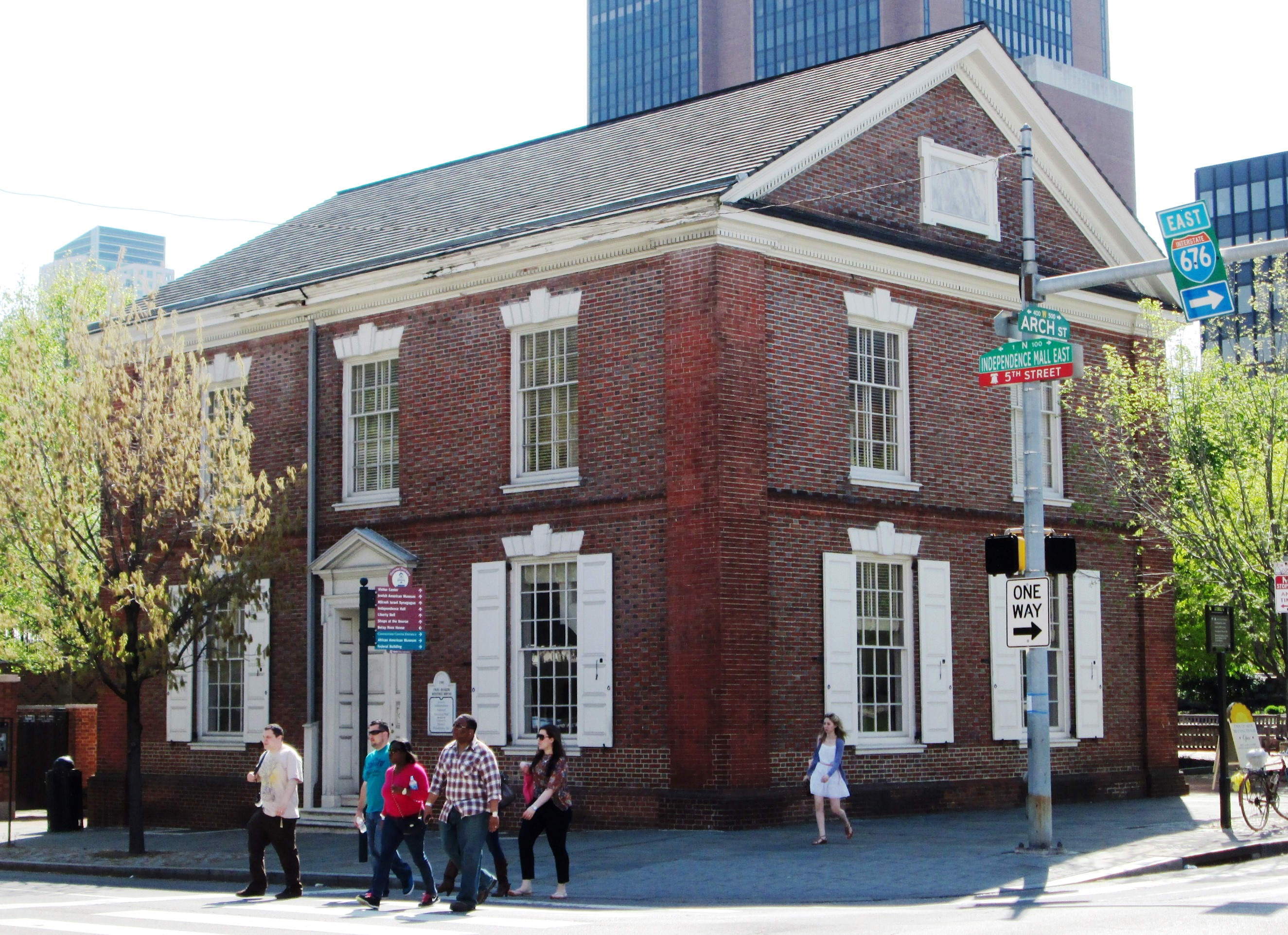
- (2013)

- Location within Philadelphia Location within Pennsylvania Location within the United States
- Location: SW corner of 5th and Arch Streets; Philadelphia, Pennsylvania
- Coordinates: 39°57′09″N 75°08′55″W
- Built: 1783
- NRHP reference No.: 71000063
- Added to NRHP: September 22, 1971

The Free Quaker Meetinghouse is a historic Free Quaker meeting house at the southeast corner of 5th and Arch Streets in the Independence National Historical Park in Philadelphia, Pennsylvania. It is the oldest surviving Quaker meeting house within the original boundaries of the city of Philadelphia, and the only surviving historic structure remaining on Independence Mall (the three blocks between Chestnut Street and Race Street). The structure is a plain 2 1/2-story Georgian-style brick building with a gable roof first constructed in 1783, with the second floor added in 1788. In 1961, the building was moved 38 feet (12 m) west and 8 feet (2.4 m) south to its present site to allow for the widening of Fifth Street as part of the creation of Independence Mall State Park.

Quaker meetings were held in the building until 1836, after which it was occupied by the Apprentices' Library Company of Philadelphia until 1897. In the 20th century, the building was used as a warehouse for plumbing supplies prior to its restoration in the Independence Mall Improvement Project.

The meetinghouse was added to the National Register of Historic Places in 1971. The building is open seasonally as part of Independence National Historical Park.
