= Benjamin Franklin National Memorial =

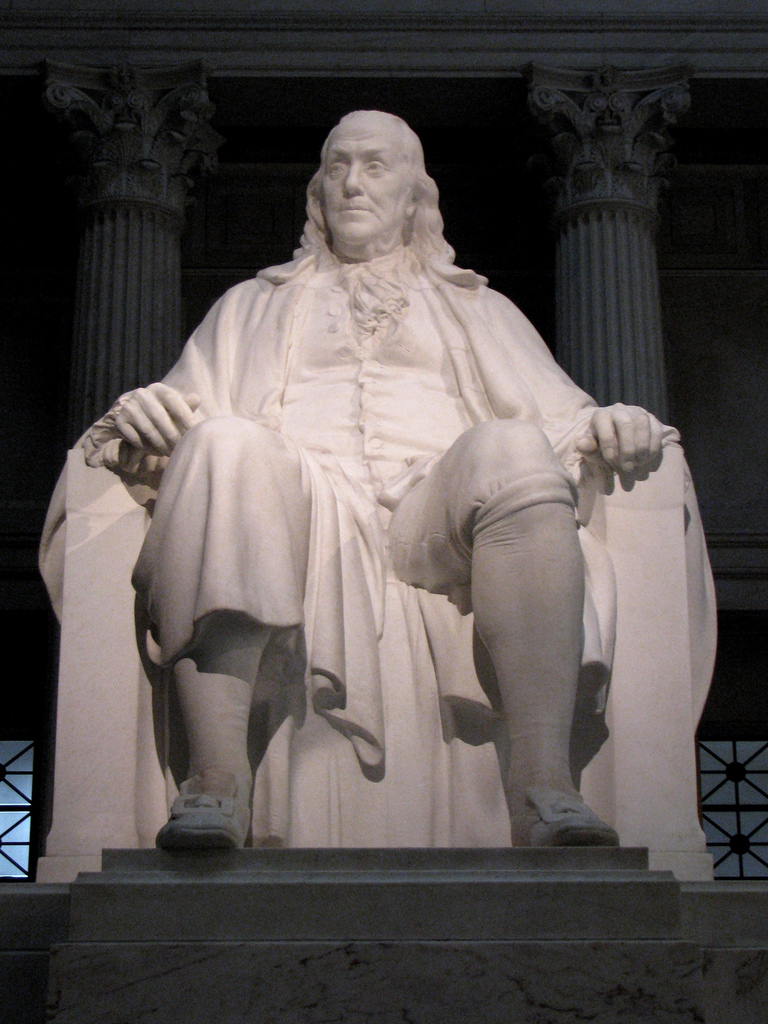
- The monument in 2007
- Interactive map of Benjamin Franklin National Memorial
- Location: Philadelphia, Pennsylvania, U.S.

Site notes
- Owner: Franklin Institute
- Visitors: 171,033 (in 2009)
- Website: Benjamin Franklin Memorial

U.S. National Memorial
- Designated: October 25, 1972

The Benjamin Franklin National Memorial, located in the rotunda of the Franklin Institute science museum in Philadelphia, Pennsylvania, features a large statue of a seated Benjamin Franklin, American writer, inventor, statesman, and Founding Father. The 20-foot (6.1 m)-tall memorial was sculpted by James Earle Fraser between 1932 and 1938 and dedicated in 1938.

With a weight of 30 short tons (27 t) the statue rests on a 92-short-ton (83 t) pedestal of white Seravezza marble. It is the focal piece of the Memorial Hall of the Franklin Institute, which was designed by John Windrim and modeled after the Roman Pantheon. The statue and Memorial Hall were designated as the Benjamin Franklin National Memorial in 1972. It is the primary location memorializing Benjamin Franklin in the U.S.

== History ==
Congress designated the national memorial on October 25, 1972 (Pub. L. 92–551). Unlike most national memorials, the statue is not listed on the National Register of Historic Places. The national memorial is an affiliated area of the National Park Service, assigned to Independence National Historical Park through a Memorandum of Agreement entered into on November 6, 1973. Under terms of the agreement, the Institute owns and maintains the publicly accessible memorial, and the Park Service includes the memorial in official publications and otherwise cooperates with the Institute in all appropriate and mutually agreeable ways on behalf of the memorial.

Public Law 109-153 (December 30, 2005) authorizes the Secretary of the Interior to make available to the Institute up to $10,000,000 in matching grants for the rehabilitation of the memorial and for the development of related exhibits. This appropriation commemorates the 300th anniversary of Franklin's birth on January 17, 1706.

In 2008, the Memorial underwent a $3.8 million restoration, which included installation of a multi-media presentation about Philadelphia's most famous citizen, now featured in the 3½-minute show "Benjamin Franklin Forever". The memorial's new digital projection, theatrical lighting, and audio effects are fully utilized in a program that introduces Franklin as a curious tinkerer, and demonstrates his profound impact on the world as a premiere international citizen, statesman, civic leader, and scientist. The refurbishment also included improved acoustics, state-of-the-art LED lighting upgrades, and restoration and re-gilding of the oculus to its original brilliance. Throughout the day, quotes from Franklin are projected onto the walls, and graphic panels highlighting his life and accomplishments provide visitors with a still greater appreciation of this Founding Father.

Admission to the National Memorial is free.

== In popular culture ==
The memorial appears in the 2004 film National Treasure.

== See also ==
- Franklin Court
- Benjamin Franklin House, in London, England, the only surviving home of Benjamin Franklin, now a museum.
- Jefferson Memorial
- James Madison Memorial Building
- George Mason Memorial
- Washington Monument
- Memorial to the 56 Signers of the Declaration of Independence
- List of national memorials of the United States
