= Independence Hall Association =

The Independence Hall Association (IHA) is a Philadelphia-based historical organization. Founded in 1942, it was the driving force behind the creation of Independence National Historical Park in Philadelphia, Pennsylvania, which houses Independence Hall, the Liberty Bell, and other buildings and historical items associated with the American Revolution.

== History ==
The Independence Hall Association was organized by Edwin O. Lewis, a former Common Pleas Court of Pennsylvania judge who at the time was president of the Pennsylvania Chapter of the Sons of the American Revolution. The organization was founded to advocate and coordinate preservation of Independence Hall, the Liberty Bell, Carpenters' Hall, Christ Church, and related colonial-era buildings in Center City Philadelphia.

Lewis was especially motivated by concerns following the attack on Pearl Harbor that Independence Hall historic district was at risk of attack by foreign hostile powers or terrorism.

In 1995, Independence Hall Association founded UShistory.org, a major historical website with over three million views as of 2014.

Independence Hall Association is a nonprofit and independent organization. Its mission today is to educate the public about the American Revolution, American Revolutionary War, the colonial era in American history, and the important role Philadelphia played historically in the nation's founding.
