= Dolley Todd House =

- U.S. Historic district – Contributing property
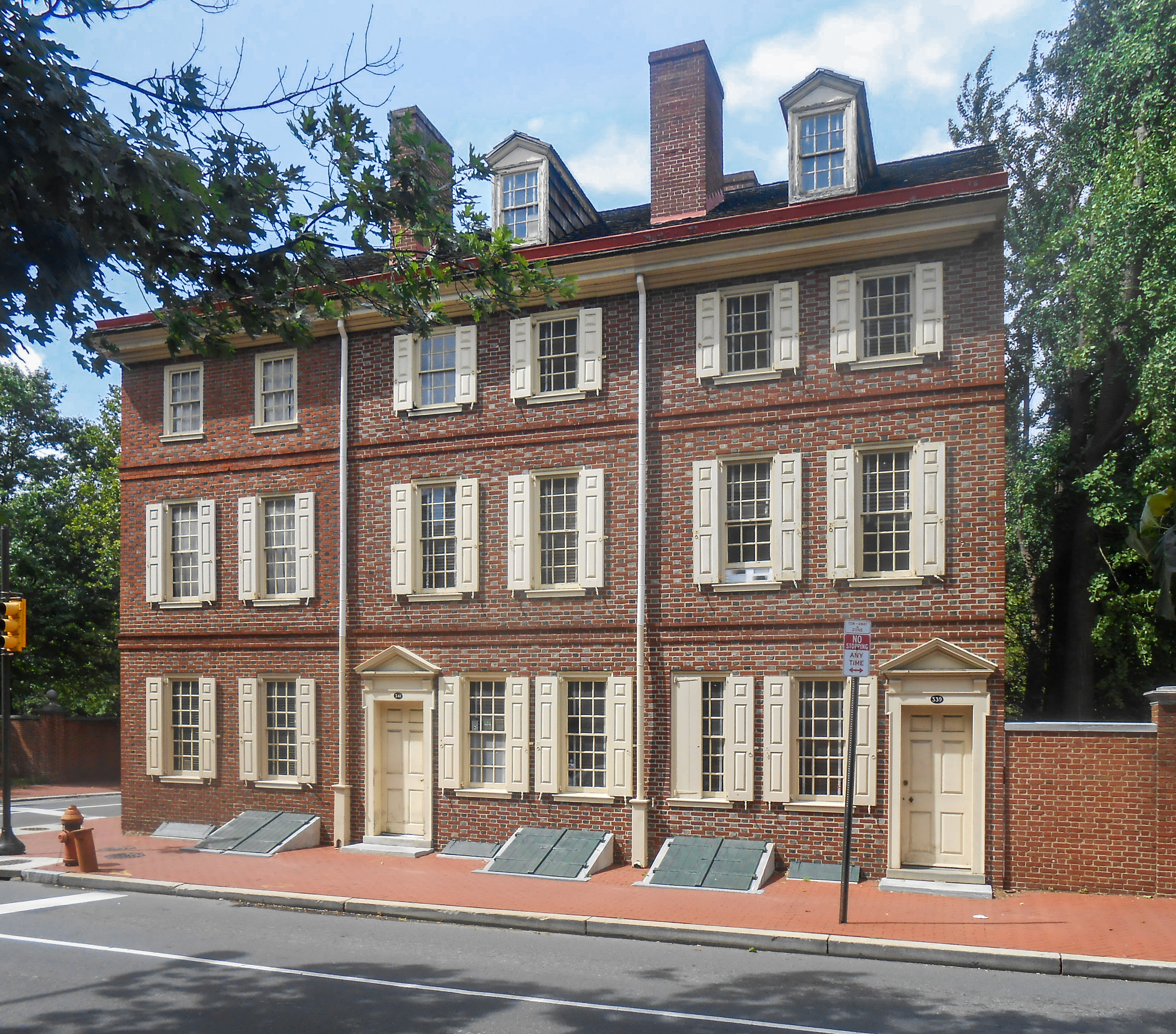

- Location within Philadelphia Location within Pennsylvania Location within the United States
- Location: 341 Walnut Street, Philadelphia, Pennsylvania
- Coordinates: 39.94745°N 75.14771°W
- Built: 1775
- Part of: Independence National Historical Park (ID66000683)

The Dolley Todd House or Dolley Todd Madison House in Philadelphia, Pennsylvania is a house constructed by carpenter John Dilworth in 1775. The house was the residence of Dolley Madison, who lived in the home with her first husband John Todd Jr. prior to his death in 1793. It is located at 341 Walnut Street in the Society Hill neighborhood of the city.

The 18th century Georgian house is part of Independence National Historical Park, and daily tours are available by ticket from the park's visitor center. The tour also includes the Bishop White House.

== See also ==
- Cutts–Madison House, a later residence of Dolley Madison in Washington, D.C.
