= Franklin Court =

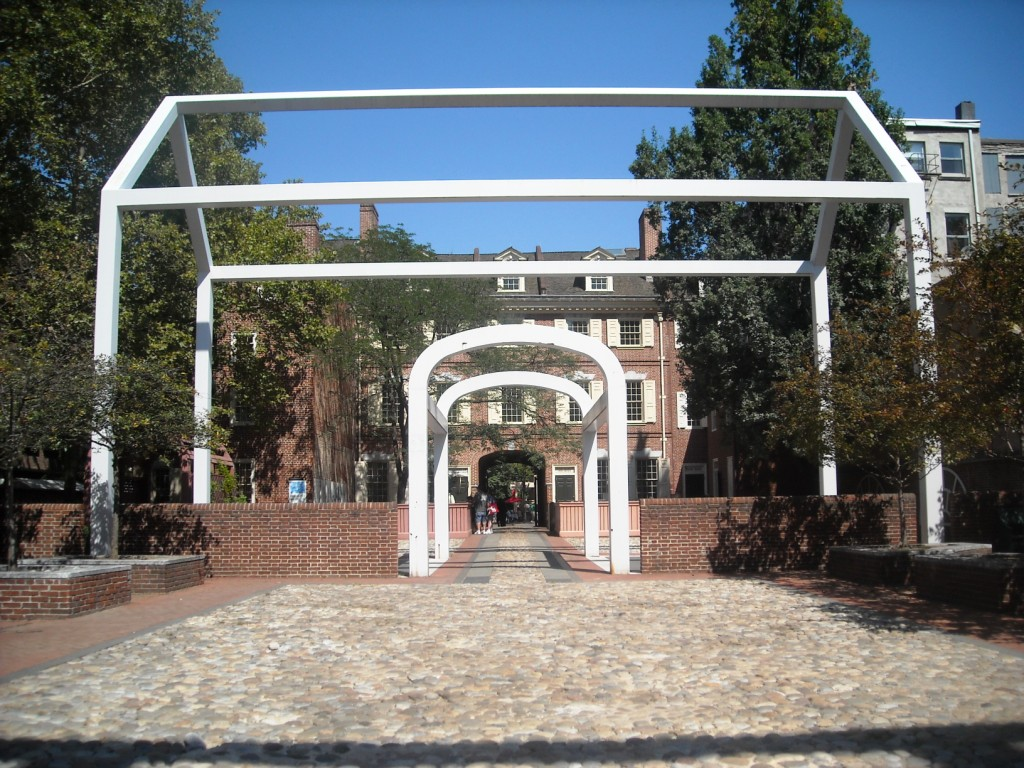
- One of Venturi & Rauch's "ghost structures" in the courtyard
- Established: 1976
- Location: Independence National Historical Park, Philadelphia, Pennsylvania
- Type: Biographical museum
- Public transit access: 5th Street/Independence Hall
- Franklin Court
- U.S. National Historic Landmark District – Contributing property
- Part of: Independence National Historical Park (ID66000683)
- Designated NHLDCP: October 15, 1966

Franklin Court is a complex of museums, structures, and historic sites within Independence National Historical Park in Philadelphia, Pennsylvania. It is located at the site which American printer, scientist, diplomat, and statesman Benjamin Franklin had his Philadelphia residence from 1763 to his death in 1790.

The complex was designed by the firm Venturi and Rauch, and opened in 1976 as part of the United States Bicentennial celebration. The site consists of the archaeological remnants of Benjamin Franklin's house and nearby buildings, "ghost" reconstruction of the form of the house and print shop, an underground museum focused on Franklin, and historic structures facing Market Street, including what are now a working post-office and printing-shop.

== History of the site ==
The court was the site of the house which Benjamin Franklin had built in 1763, which he owned until his death in 1790. Though Franklin was overseas during a significant portion of that time, he was in Philadelphia during much of his tenure and involvement with both the Second Continental Congress and the United States Constitutional Convention. Franklin permanently moved into the house in 1785.

The house itself was built within a large courtyard in the middle of the block, accessed through an alleyway from Market Street.

In 1787, Franklin built a print shop within the lot for his grandson Benjamin Franklin Bache, who would publish the Philadelphia Aurora there. Franklin died at the site in 1790.

The house (and with it, it is suspected, the print shop) was demolished in 1812 during a redevelopment of the courtyard to an income-producing property. From 1950 on, the Park Service began purchasing and assembling the lots, and in the 1950s and 60s conducted archaeological excavations there in search of what remained of the Franklin-era structures.

== Architecture ==
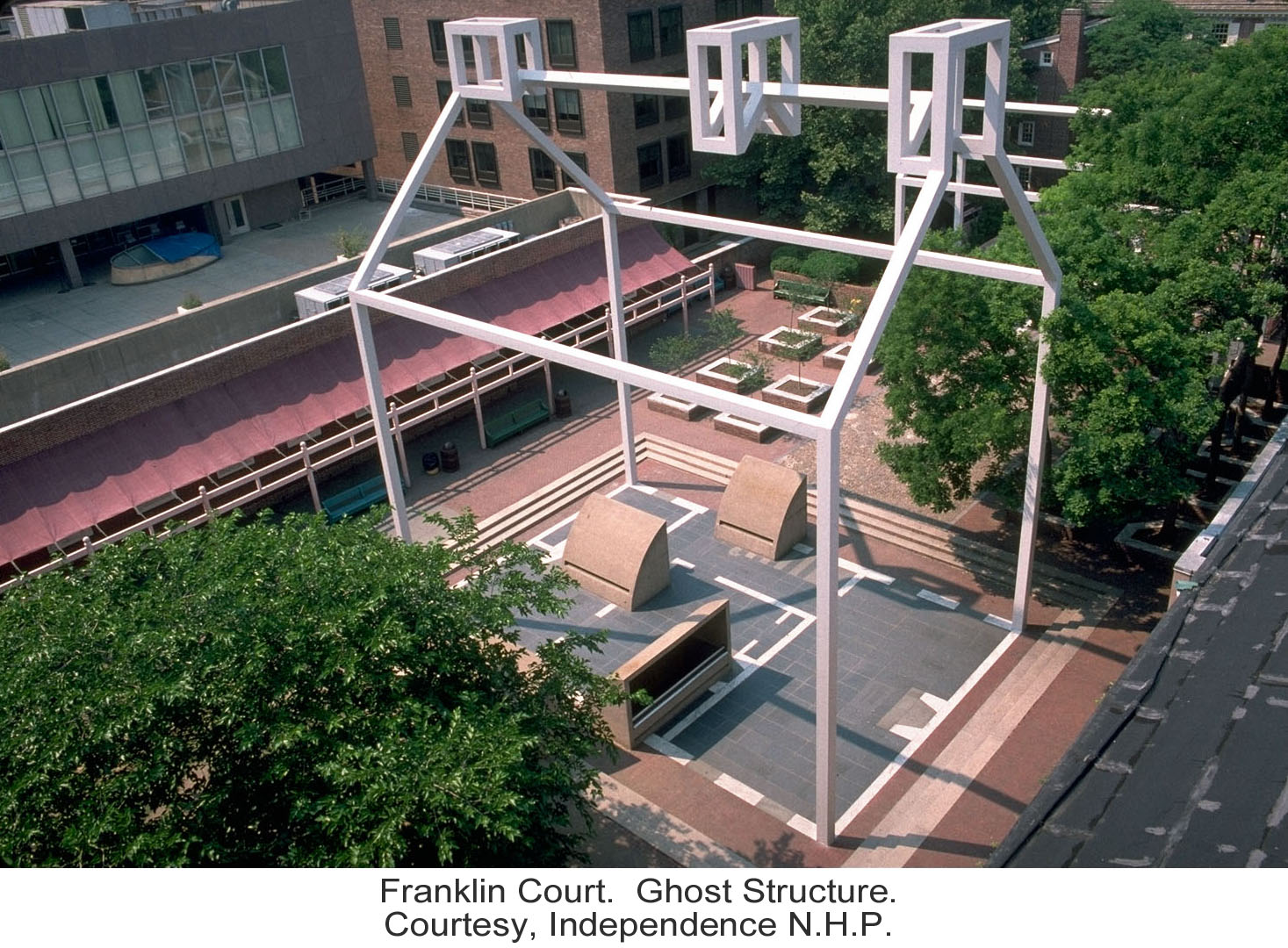
The larger of Venturi and Rauch's ghost structures

With the approach of the United States Bicentennial celebration two years away, in 1974, the Philadelphia architectural firm of Venturi and Rauch created the design for the landscape and museum at Franklin Court.

Most notable are the two "ghost structures" made of square tubular steel, recreating and suggesting the outline of the long-demolished buildings within the courtyard. The design resulted from inadequate historical information to properly reconstruct the structures, coupled with emerging philosophical views at the time towards reconstruction of structures. The design concept has since been emulated at other historic sites. Ten years after their construction, in 1986, the National Park Service specifically noted that the "ghost structures" should be evaluated upon reaching the 50-year limit for the National Register of Historic Places, and were listed as "non-historic, contributing." According to the National Register nomination, the larger frame, depicting the Franklin House, is 49'5" x 33', by 50'6" tall at the crest of the roof, while the smaller frame, depicting the Print Shop, measures 48' by 20', with 48 feet to the crest of the roof. Pavement changes demarcate the arrangement of rooms, and concrete hoods permit visitors to look down to the archaeological remains beneath.

== Benjamin Franklin Museum ==
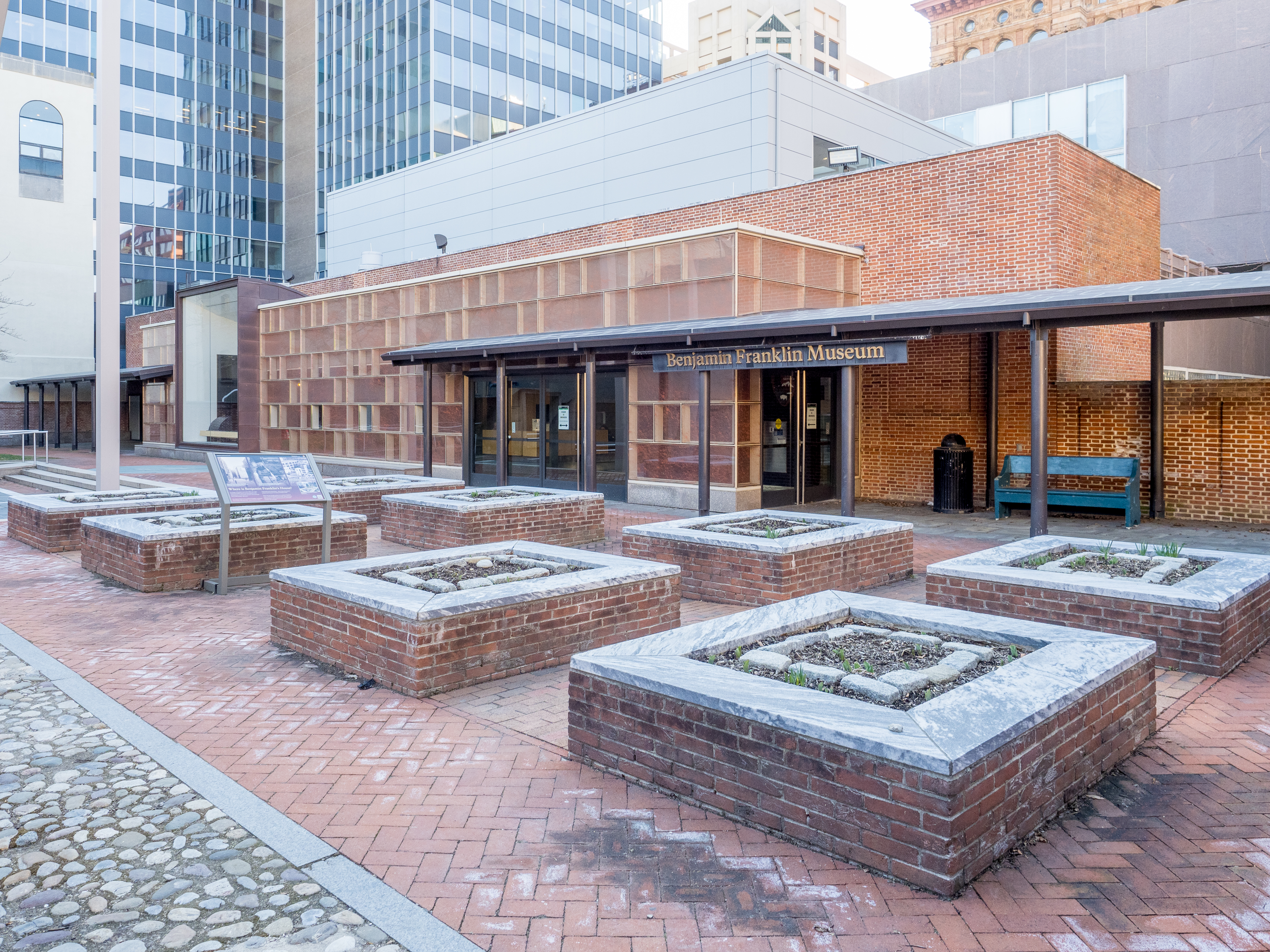

The museum itself is located beneath much of the surface of the court, and was built around the archaeological remains of the house. It was listed as non-contributing in the National Register nomination.

From 2011 to 2013, the Franklin Court Museum underwent a multi-year total renovation. Venturi and Denise Scott Brown (who also worked for the firm at the time) expressed disapproval of the plan, insofar as it negatively altered the 1974 design considerations and failing to recognize those considerations. The museum reopened to the public in August 2013.

The Benjamin Franklin Museum exhibit area contains a series of five rooms that contain short films, and interactive examples of language, pastimes, ideas, and inventions based on prominent character traits of Benjamin Franklin and other individuals who share his time and place in history. Each room contains videos, touch screen interactive, mechanical interactive, and artifacts.

The five character traits exemplified by Benjamin Franklin that are highlighted by the rooms in the museum are: ardent and dutiful, ambitious and rebellious, motivated to improve, curious and full of wonder, and strategic and persuasive.

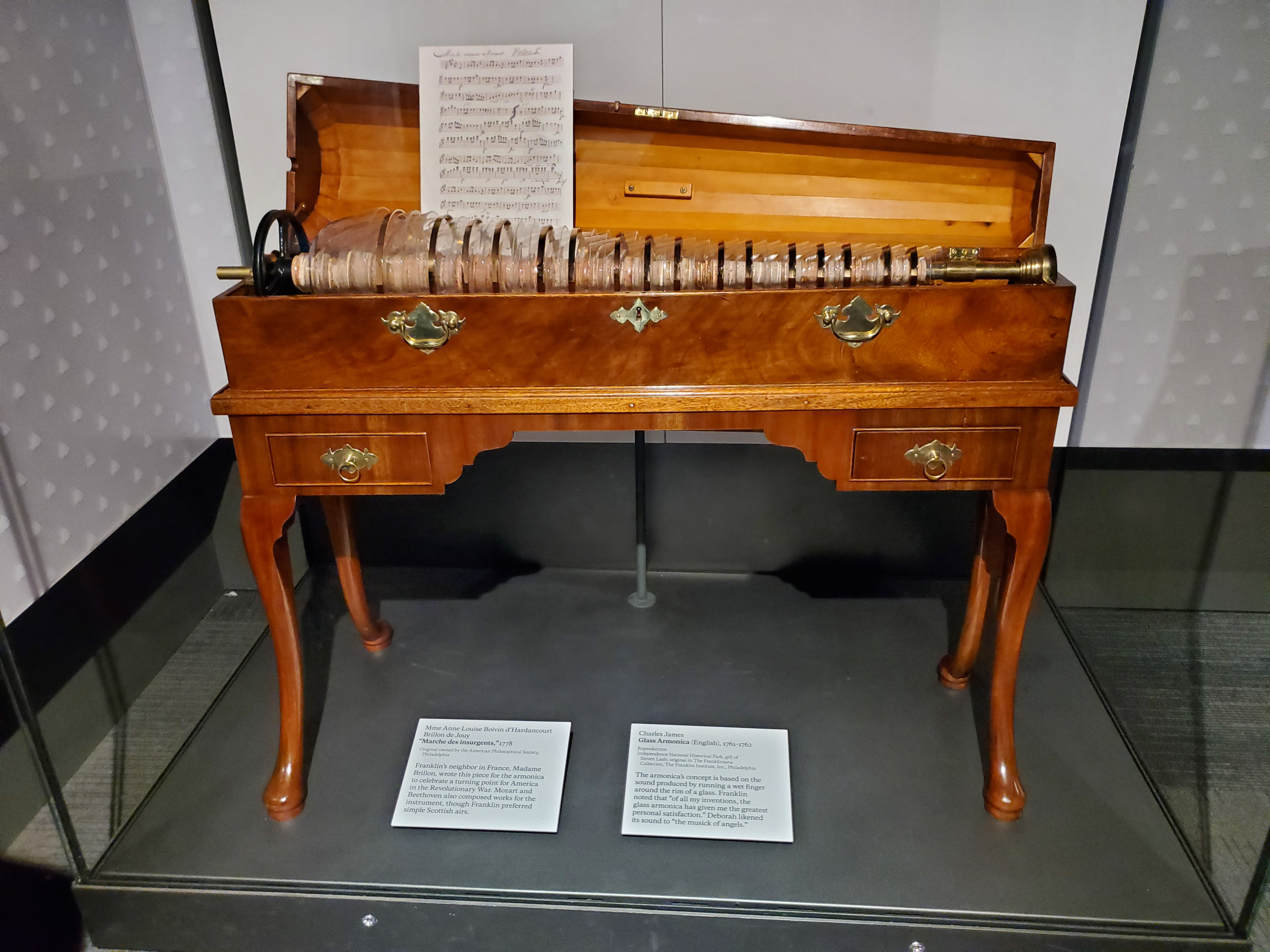
Glass display case containing Glass Armonica

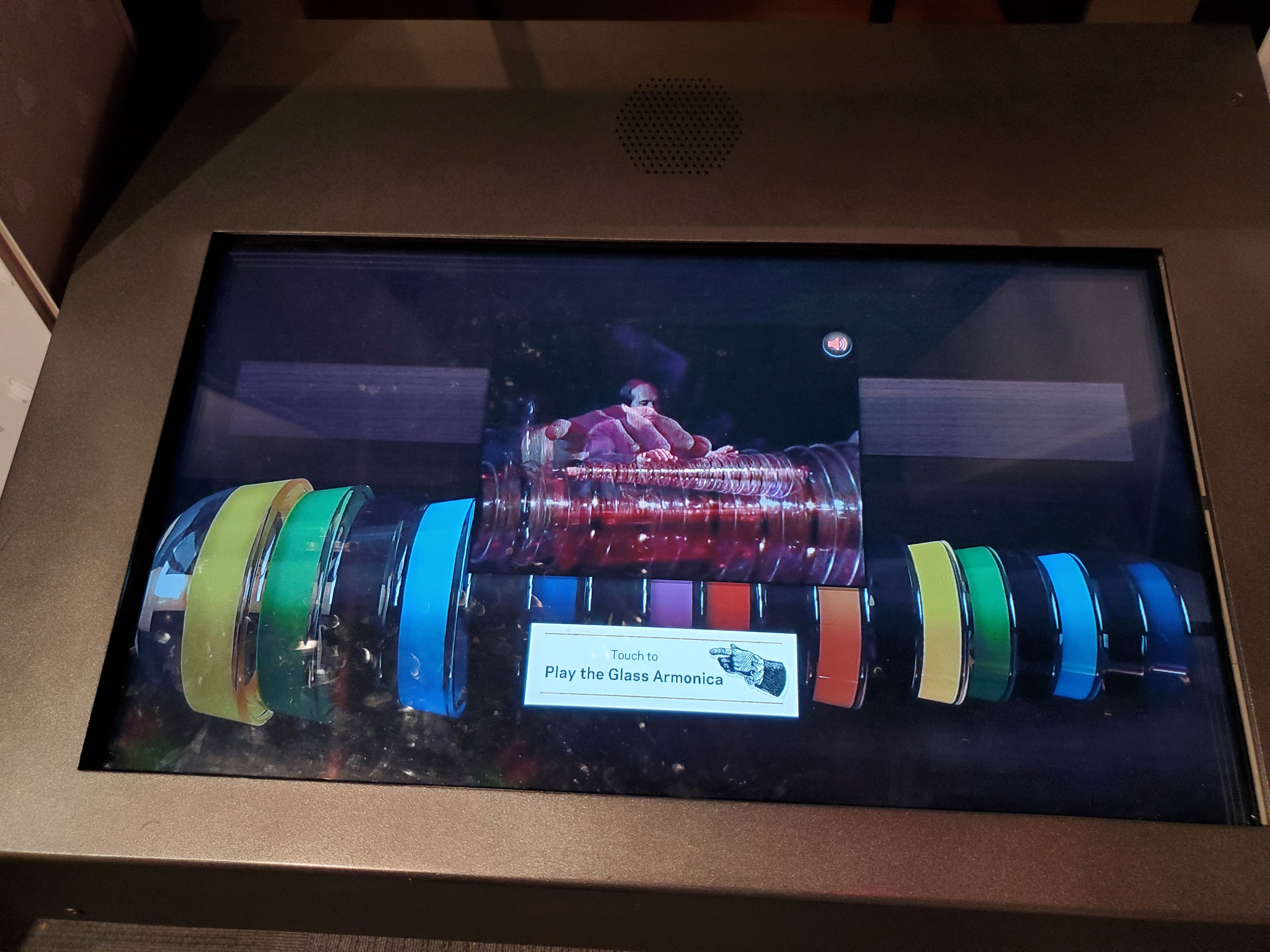
Touch Screen Interactive: Glass Armonica

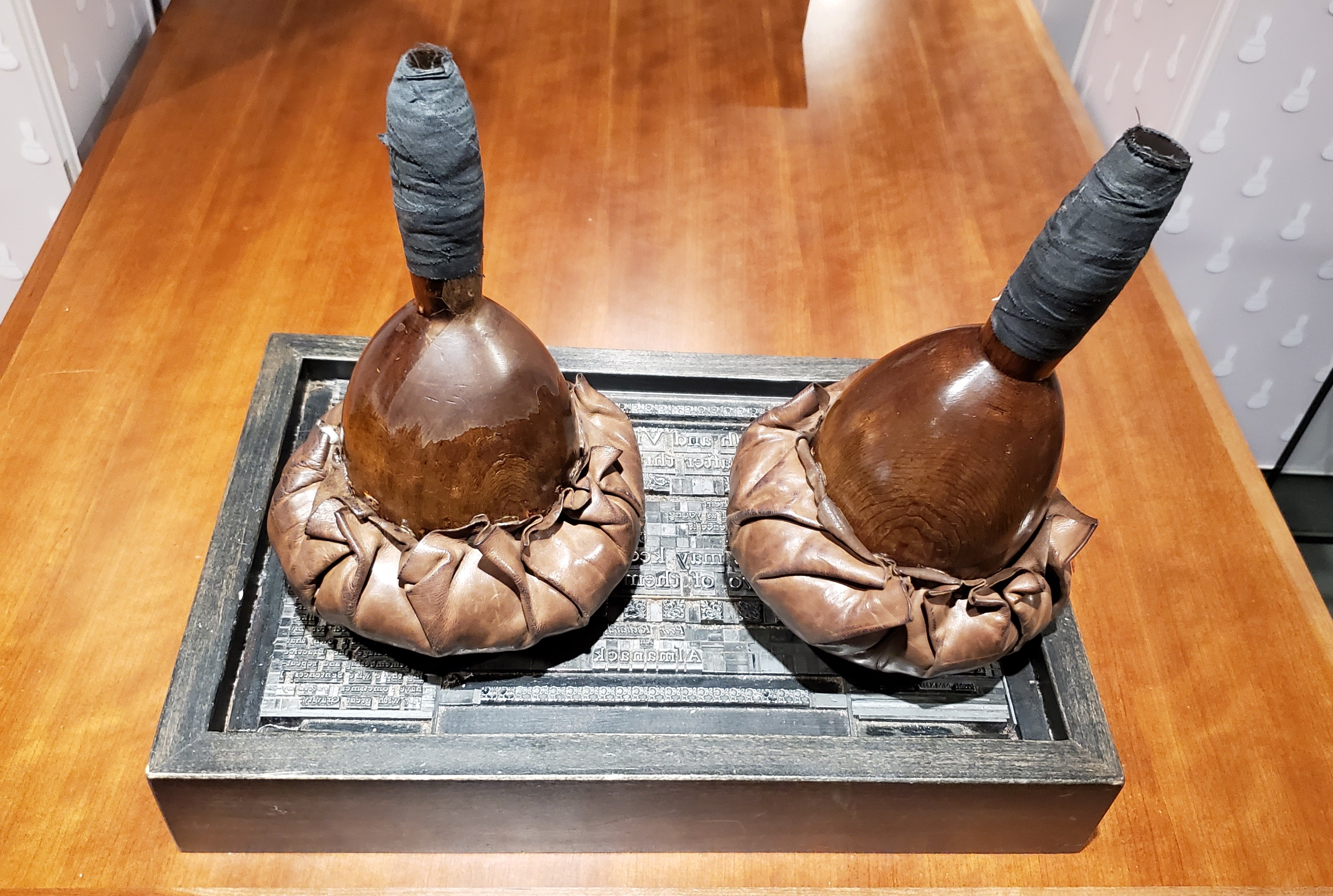
Mechanical Interactive: Printing Press Ink

== Franklin Court Printing Office ==
The Franklin Court Printing Office contains several exhibits, including a typesetting area, a bindery, two reproduction 18th century presses, and the newspaper office that once belonged to Benjamin Franklin's grandson, Benjamin Franklin Bache. Park rangers are stationed in the Printing Office to demonstrate typesetting and use of the 18th century printing press to visitors.

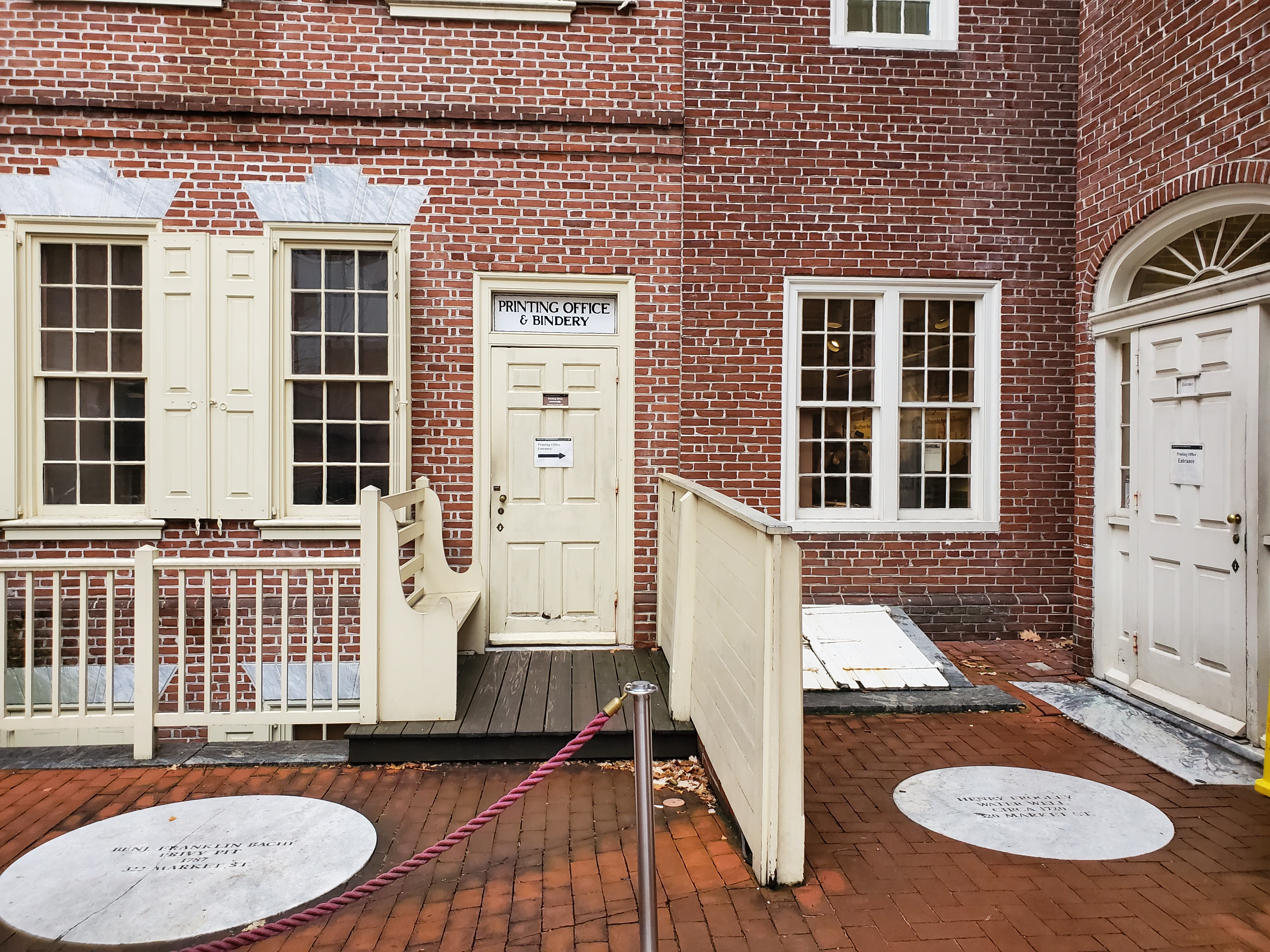
Franklin Court Printing Office Entrance

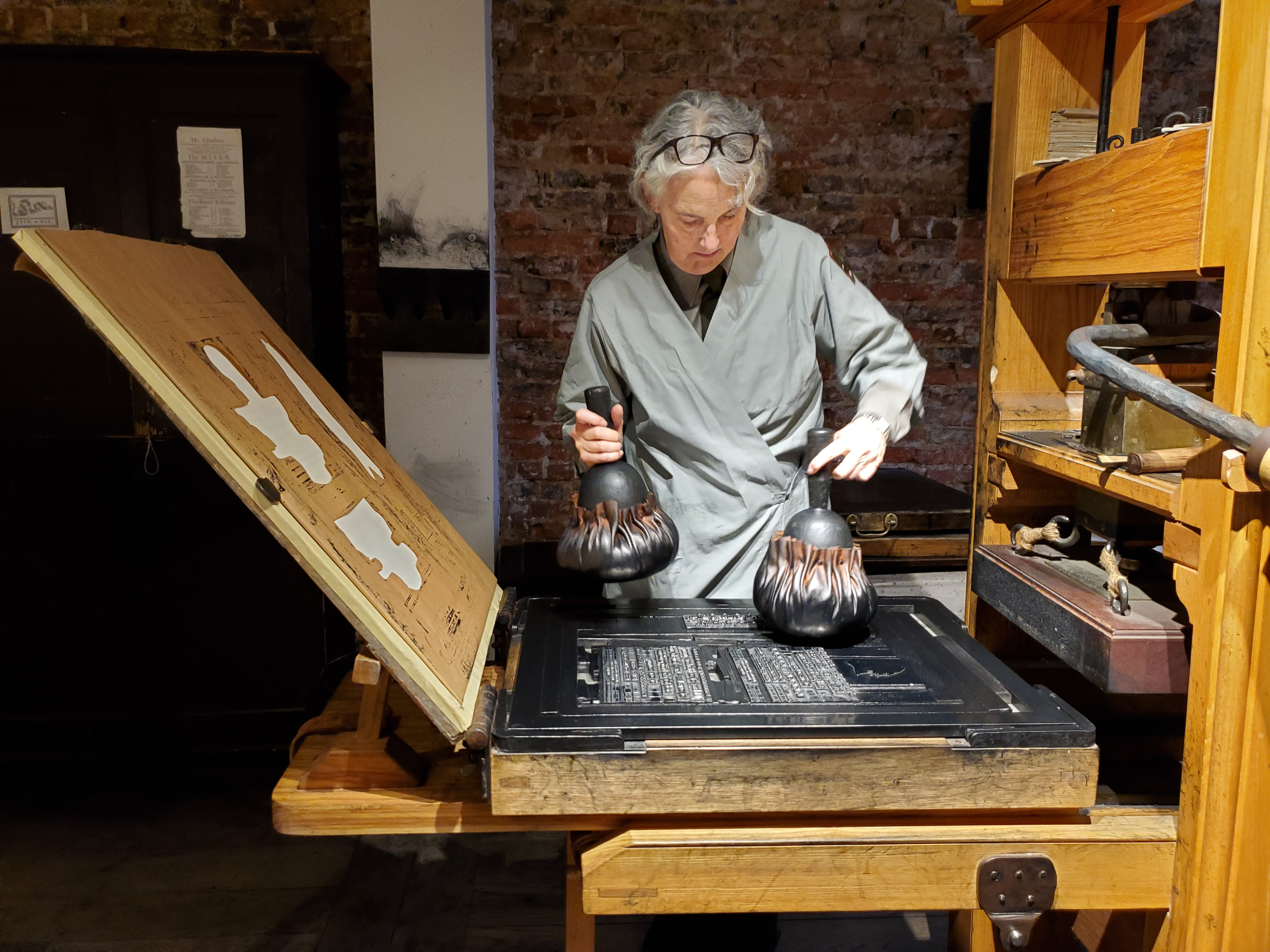
Park Ranger demonstrating adding ink to the typesetting

== See also ==
- Ben Franklin House - historic Philadelphia hotel
- Benjamin Franklin House - London residence
- Benjamin Franklin National Memorial - Philadelphia
- Founding Fathers of the United States
