= Independence National Historical Park =

Historic site in Philadelphia, Pennsylvania, US

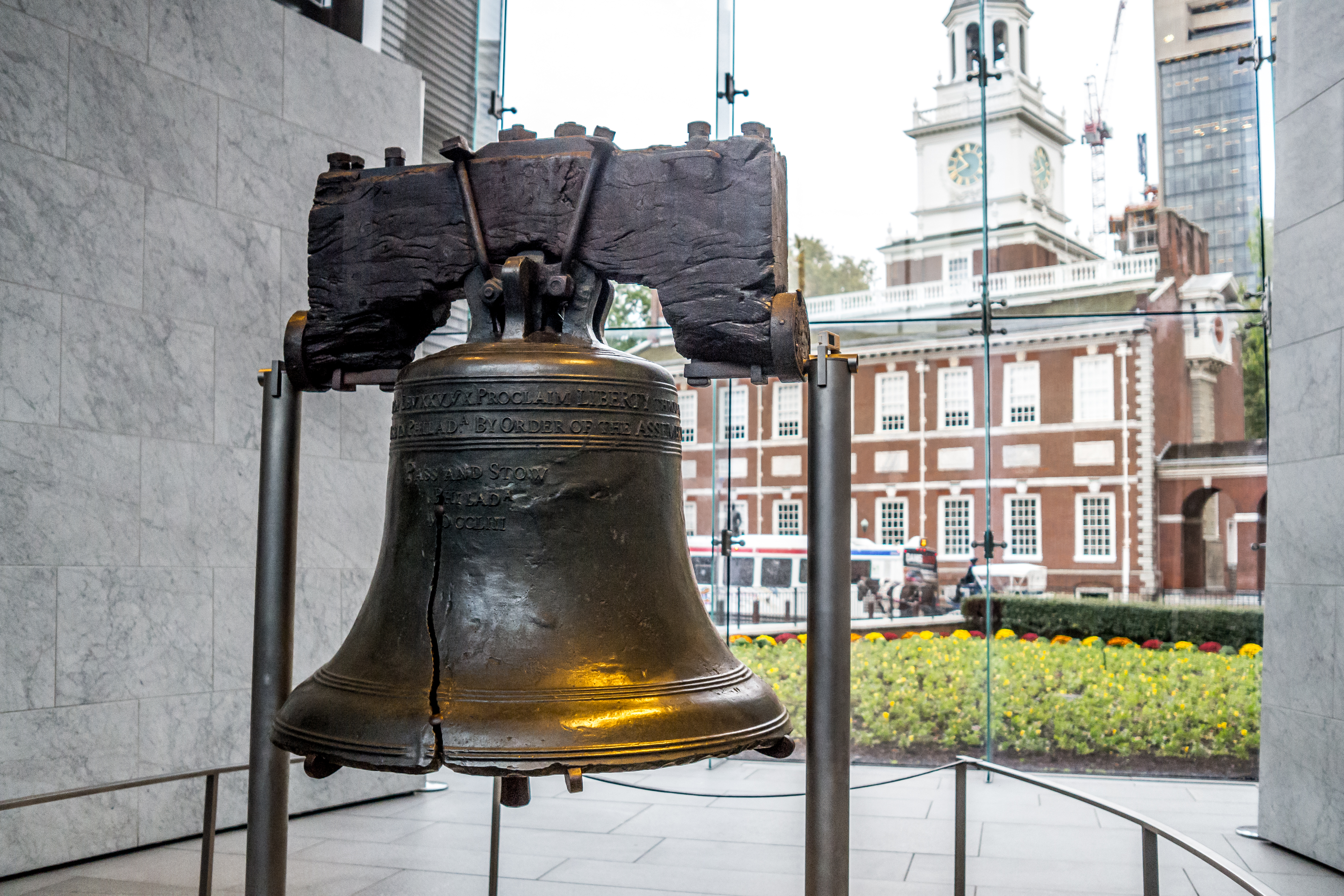
- The Liberty Bell (foreground) and Independence Hall (background) at Independence National Historical Park

- Location within Philadelphia Location within Pennsylvania Location within the United States
- 39.947778°N 75.148056°W
- Location: 143 S. 3rd Street, Philadelphia, Pennsylvania, U.S.

Site notes
- Area: 55.42 acres (22.43 ha)
- Architect(s): William Strickland, et al.
- Architectural styles: Colonial, Georgian, and Federal
- Governing body: National Park Service
- Visitors: 1,926,580 (in 2025)
- Website: nps.gov

U.S. National Historic Landmark District
- Designated: October 15, 1966
- Reference no.: 66000683

U.S. National Historical Park
- Designated: June 28, 1948

Independence National Historical Park is a federally protected historic district in Philadelphia, Pennsylvania, that preserves several sites associated with the American Revolution and the nation's founding history. Administered by the National Park Service, the 55-acre (22 ha) park comprises many of Philadelphia's most-visited historic sites within the Old City and Society Hill neighborhoods. The park has been nicknamed "America's most historic square mile" because of its abundance of historic landmarks.

The centerpiece of the park is Independence Hall, where the Declaration of Independence and the United States Constitution were debated and adopted by America's Founding Fathers in the late 18th century.

Two blocks east of Independence Hall is Carpenters' Hall, where the First Continental Congress met in 1774. There, twelve of the 13 Colonies (Georgia sent no representatives) passed and signed the Continental Association, agreeing that they would act together in boycotting goods from Great Britain. Independence Hall was the principal meeting place of the Second Continental Congress, from 1775 to 1783, and housed the Constitutional Convention in the summer of 1787.

East of Independence Hall is Old City Hall, which housed the U.S. Supreme Court from 1790 to 1800, and west of Independence Hall is Congress Hall, which housed the U.S. House of Representatives on its first floor and the U.S. Senate on its second floor, also from 1790 to 1800. Philadelphia served as the temporary capital of the United States during those ten years, while Washington, D.C. was under construction.

North of Independence Hall is the Liberty Bell, an iconic symbol of American independence, displayed in the Liberty Bell Center. The park contains other historic buildings, such as the First Bank of the United States, the first bank chartered by the U.S. Congress, and the Second Bank of the United States, which had its charter renewal vetoed by President Andrew Jackson as part of the Bank War. The Park also contains City Tavern, a recreated colonial tavern, which was a favorite of the delegates and which John Adams felt was the finest tavern in all America.

Most of the park's historic structures are located in the vicinity of the four landscaped blocks between Chestnut, Walnut, 2nd, and 6th streets. The park also contains Franklin Court, the site where Benjamin Franklin's home once stood and the present-day location of a Franklin museum and the United States Postal Service Museum (Franklin was the first Postmaster General of the revolutionary government). An additional three blocks directly north of Independence Hall, collectively known as Independence Mall, contain the Liberty Bell Center, National Constitution Center, Independence Visitor Center, and the former site of the President's House. The park also contains other historical artifacts, such as the Syng inkstand which was used during the signings of both the Declaration and the Constitution.

== History ==
=== Continental Congress and American Revolution ===
In response to the Intolerable Acts, which had punished Boston for the Boston Tea Party, the First Continental Congress met at Carpenters' Hall in Philadelphia from September 5, 1774, to October 26, 1774.

The convention organized a pact among the colonies to boycott British goods, the Continental Association, starting December 1, 1774 and provided for a Second Continental Congress in Philadelphia.

On May 10, 1775, the Second Continental Congress assembled at the Pennsylvania State House after the Battles of Lexington and Concord marked the beginning of the American Revolutionary War. Congress adopted the Olive Branch Petition in July 1775, which affirmed American loyalty to Great Britain and entreated King George III to prevent further conflict.

The petition was rejected in August 1775, the King's Proclamation of Rebellion formally declared the colonies to be in a state of rebellion.

In February 1776, colonists received news that Parliament passed the Prohibitory Act, which established a blockade of American ports and declared American ships to be enemy vessels. Although the measure amounted to a virtual declaration of war by the British, Congress did not have immediate authority to declare independence until each individual colony authorized its delegates to vote for independence.

On June 11, the Second Continental Congress appointed the Committee of Five, which included John Adams of Massachusetts, Benjamin Franklin of Pennsylvania, Thomas Jefferson of Virginia, Robert R. Livingston of New York, and Roger Sherman of Connecticut, to draft an official declaration of independence. Congress unanimously adopted its final version of the Declaration on July 4, marking the formation of the United States of America. Historians believe that the Old State House Bell, now known as the Liberty Bell, was one of the bells rung to mark the reading of the Declaration on July 8.

=== Philadelphia Convention ===
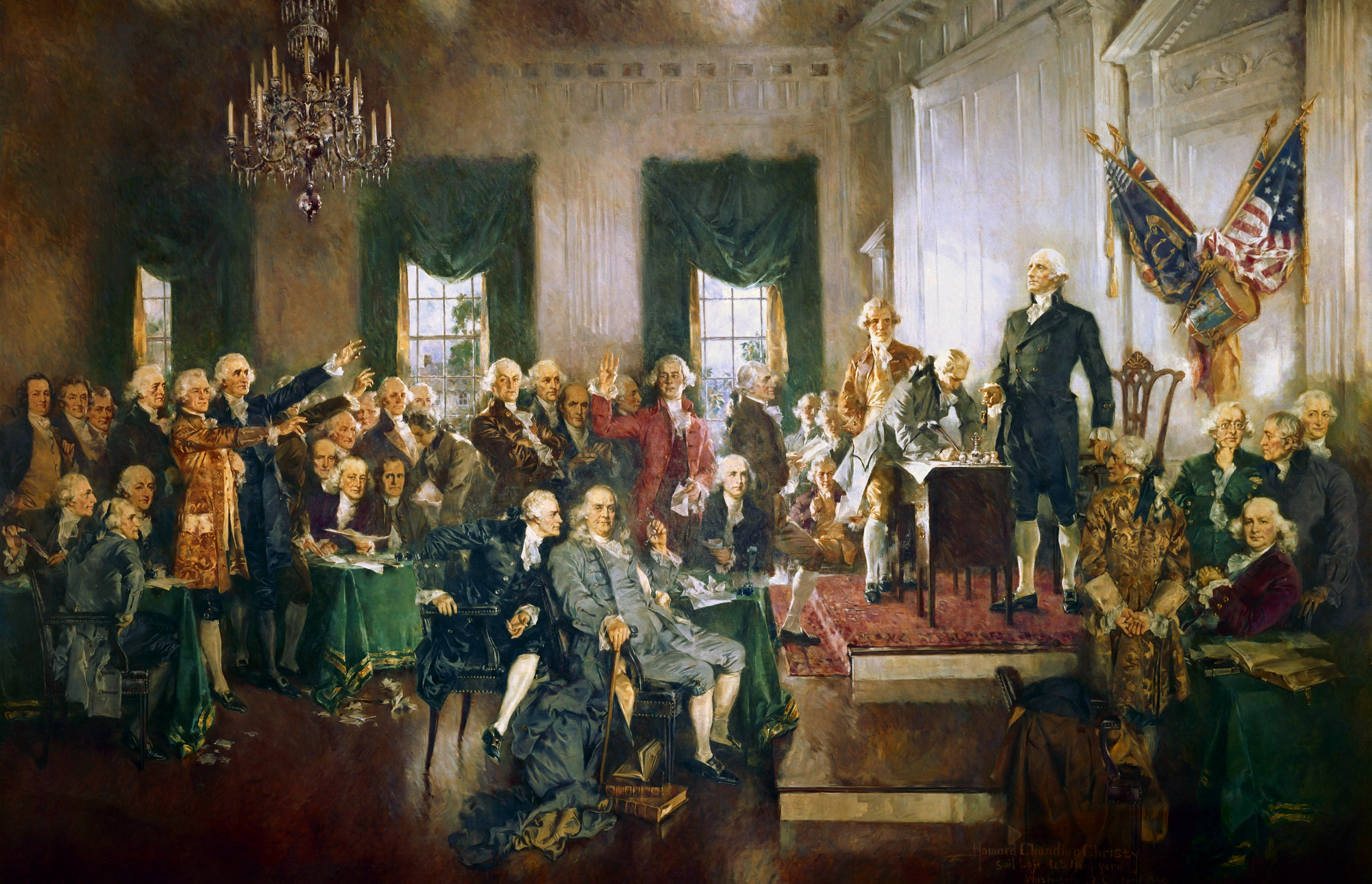
Scene at the Signing of the Constitution of the United States, a 1940 portrait by Howard Chandler Christy

After 1781, the national government operated under the Articles of Confederation, which gave the federal government virtually no power to regulate domestic affairs or raise revenue. At the Annapolis Convention in September 1786, the delegates asked for a broader meeting to be held the next May in Philadelphia to address the regulation of trade and the structure of the government. This resulted in the Philadelphia Convention, which met from May 14 to September 17, 1787, at the Pennsylvania State House.

The convention was dominated by controversies and conflicting interests, but the delegates forged a Constitution that has been called a "bundle of compromises". At the convention, delegate James Madison presented the Virginia Plan, which proposed a national government with three branches with proportional representation. Large states supported this plan, but smaller states feared losing substantial power under the plan. In response, William Paterson designed the New Jersey Plan, which proposed a one-house (unicameral) legislature in which each state, regardless of size, would have one vote, as under the Articles of Confederation. Roger Sherman combined the two plans with the Connecticut Compromise, and his measure passed on July 16, 1787, by seven to six—a margin of one vote. Other contentious issues were slavery and the federal regulation of commerce, which resulted in additional compromises.

=== Seat of the federal government ===
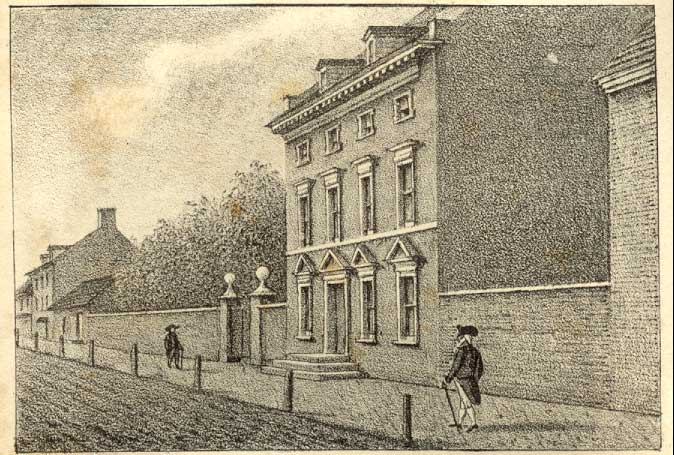
The President's House, which served as the presidential mansion of George Washington, the nation's first president, from 1790 to 1797, and then for John Adams, the nation's second president, from 1797–1800

The Residence Act of 1790 empowered President George Washington to locate a permanent capital along the Potomac River. Robert Morris, a representative from Pennsylvania, convinced Congress to designate Philadelphia as the temporary capital city of the United States federal government. From December 6, 1790, to May 14, 1800, the same block hosted federal, state, county, and city government offices. Congress Hall, which was originally built to serve as the Philadelphia County Courthouse, served as the seat of the United States Congress. The House of Representatives convened on the first floor and the Senate convened on the second floor. During Congress Hall's duration as the capitol of the United States, the country admitted three new states: Vermont, Kentucky, and Tennessee; ratified the Bill of Rights of the United States Constitution; and oversaw the Presidential inaugurations of both George Washington (his second) and John Adams. The President's House served as the official residence and principal workplace for President George Washington during his two terms, and President John Adams occupied it from March 1797 to May 1800. At the house, the Fugitive Slave Act of 1793 and the Alien and Sedition Acts were signed. The Supreme Court met at Old City Hall, where Chief Justices John Jay, John Rutledge, and Oliver Ellsworth presided over eleven docketed cases.

While plans for the permanent capital were being developed, Pennsylvania delegates continued to put forth effort to undermine the plan. The city began construction on a massive new presidential palace on Ninth Street and an expansion to Congress Hall. Regardless of these efforts, the federal government relocated from Philadelphia for the final time on May 14, 1800.

=== Usage as a municipal facility ===
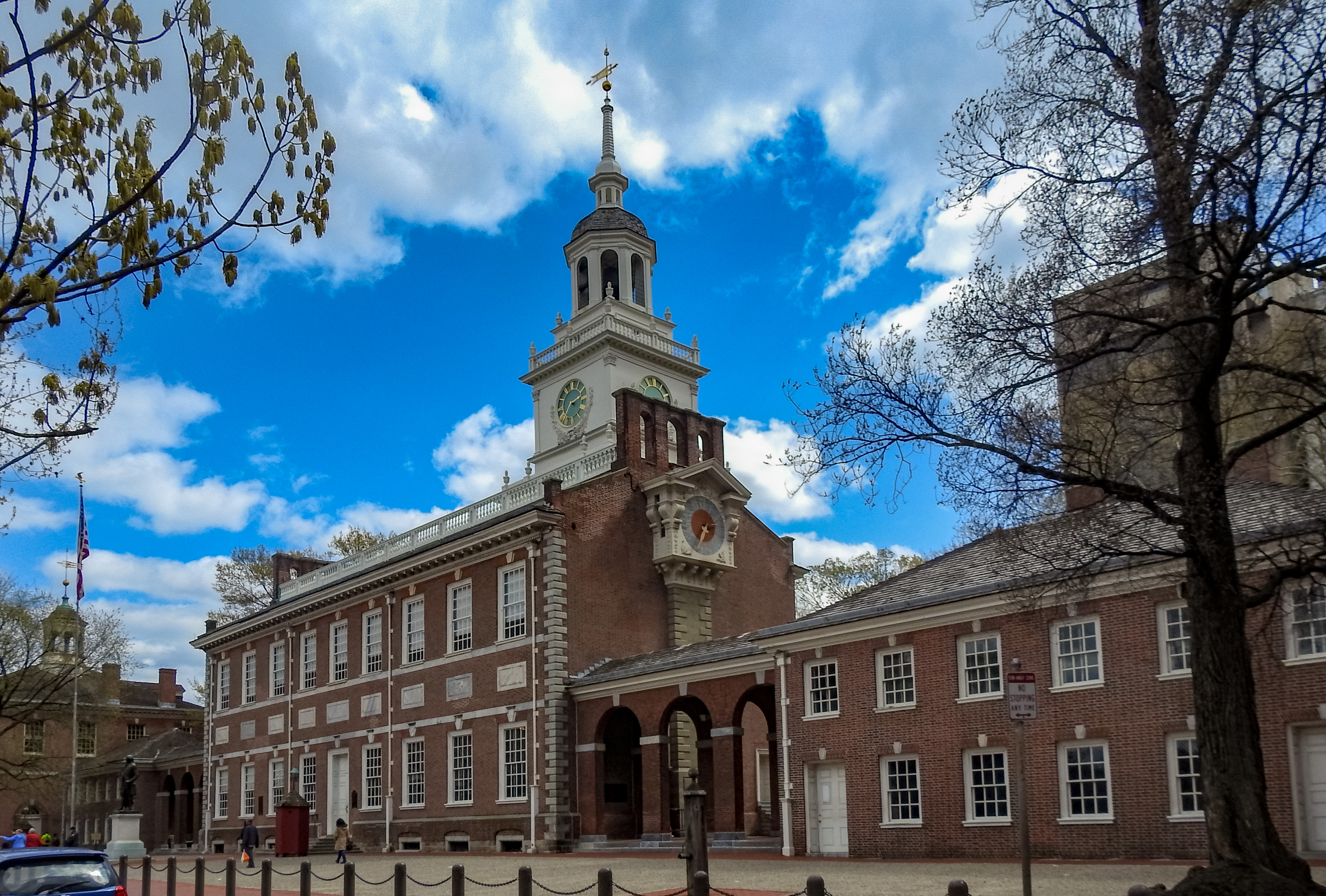
Independence Hall, the iconic Philadelphia building where the Founding Fathers unanimously adopted the U.S. Declaration of Independence and appointed George Washington as commander of the Continental Army in a bold but risky effort to secure independence from Britain's colonial governance

Despite its crucial role in the nation's founding, the site served most of its useful life as a municipal facility after the federal government relocated to the District of Columbia. The state government moved to Harrisburg in October 1812, and since there was little use for the Pennsylvania State House, the State of Pennsylvania considered selling it and dividing the State House Yard into building lots as early as 1802.

The state came close to demolishing the hall in 1816. By 1818, the buildings had become surplus state property and were purchased by the City of Philadelphia, which used them uneventfully until late in the nineteenth century when the city government moved into a new city hall. In 1852, the Liberty Bell was removed from its steeple and put on public display within the "Declaration Chamber" of Independence Hall. Between 1885 and 1915, the Liberty Bell made seven trips by train to various expositions and celebrations until the city refused further requests.

== Park history ==
The district's importance had waned with the western movement of City Hall and other institutions, but it remained an active and occupied business center. The first proposal for an Independence Hall park originated in 1915, when architects Albert Kelsey and D. Knickerbacker Boyd proposed clearing the half-block between Chestnut Street and Ludlow Street in front of Independence Hall. Kelsey and Boyd were motivated by a desire to create a fitting setting for Independence Hall, lessen the fire hazard, reduce congestion, and beautify the entire district. The idea for a park gained momentum in the 1920s and 1930s, with patriotic sentiment accompanying the American Sesqui-Centennial in 1926. The commencement of World War II led to a heightened sense of patriotism and urgency toward the protection of national monuments.

On June 28, 1948, Congress passed Public Law 795, H.R. 5053 to authorize the creation of Independence National Historical Park, and it was formally established on July 4, 1956. On March 16, 1959, it incorporated the Old Philadelphia Customs House (Second Bank of the United States), which had been designated a national historic site on May 26, 1939. As with all historic areas administered by the National Park Service, the park was listed on the National Register of Historic Places on October 15, 1966. In 1973, the Pennsylvania legislature voted to transfer the three blocks that compose Independence Mall to the federal government. Independence Hall was designated a UNESCO World Heritage Site on October 24, 1979.

The Federal Bureau of Prisons Northeast Region Office is in the U.S. Custom House.

== Management ==
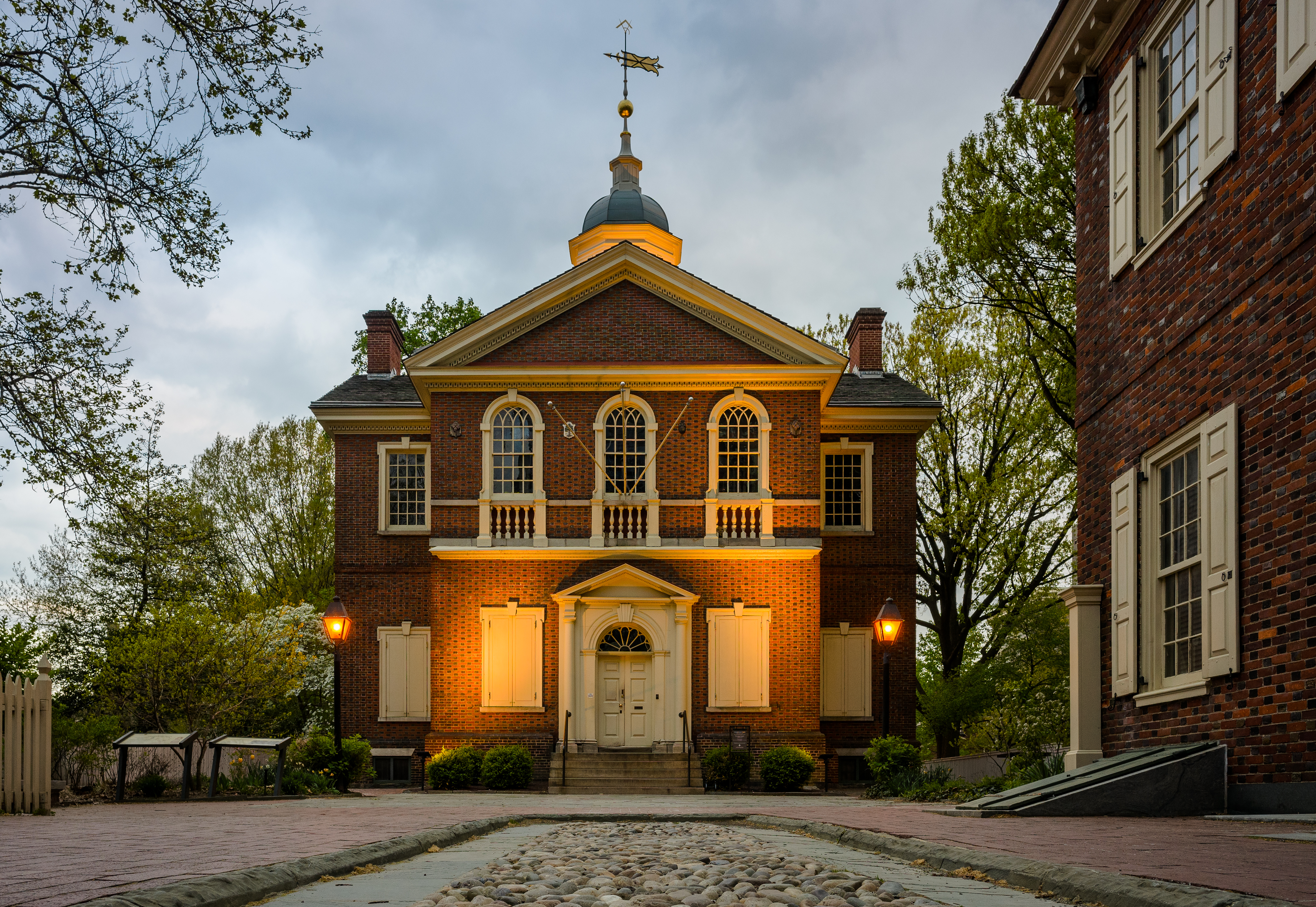
Carpenters' Hall

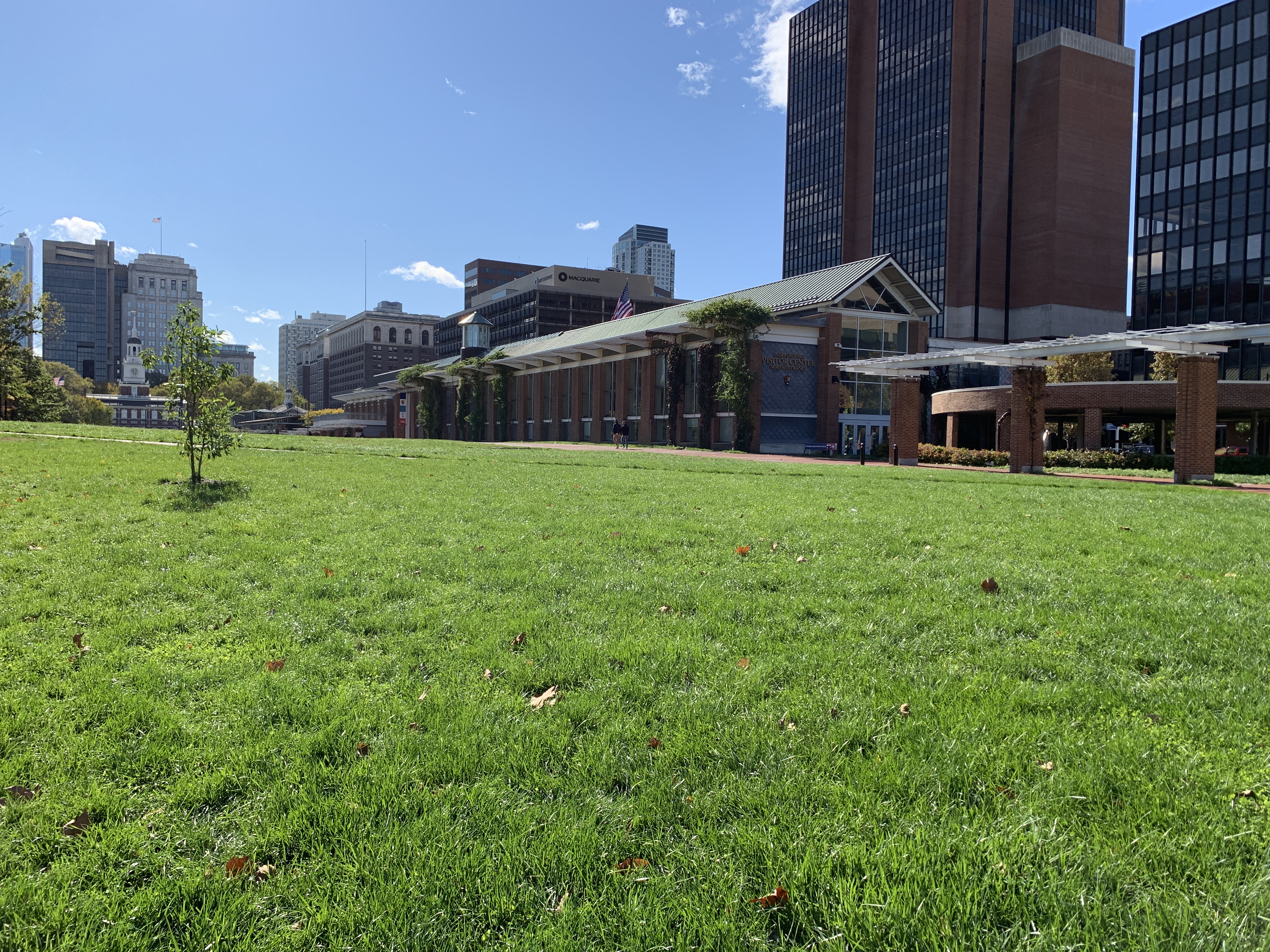
Exterior view of the Visitor Center

The National Park Service, a federal agency within the Department of the Interior, is responsible for the park's maintenance and preservation. In the 2003 fiscal year, the National Park Service spent approximately US$30.7 million on the park. Personnel and benefit costs represented about 41 percent of expenditures, and non-recurring construction and investment projects represented about 25 percent of expenditures. The Independence Visitor Center is operated as a joint venture between Independence National Historical Park and the Independence Visitor Center Corporation, a nonprofit organization. The National Park Service employs 247 permanent employees and seven seasonal employees. The park's cultural resource management program protects the historic buildings, archaeological sites, and cultural landscapes within the park, and approximately 1.5 million artifacts within the park. In 2003, the park's major projects primarily addressed repair and rehabilitation of park buildings and grounds.

The Independence Visitor Center has information on Independence National Historical Park, the City of Philadelphia, the South Jersey and Delaware River waterfront, and the surround Bucks, Chester, Delaware, and Montgomery counties in Pennsylvania. The 50,000-square-foot (4,600 m^{2}) building was constructed in 2001 as the result of a cooperative effort among many area organizations, with funding from The Pew Charitable Trusts, the Commonwealth of Pennsylvania, the Delaware River Port Authority, the Annenberg Foundation, the Connelly Foundation, and the John S. and James L. Knight Foundation.

== Independence Mall ==
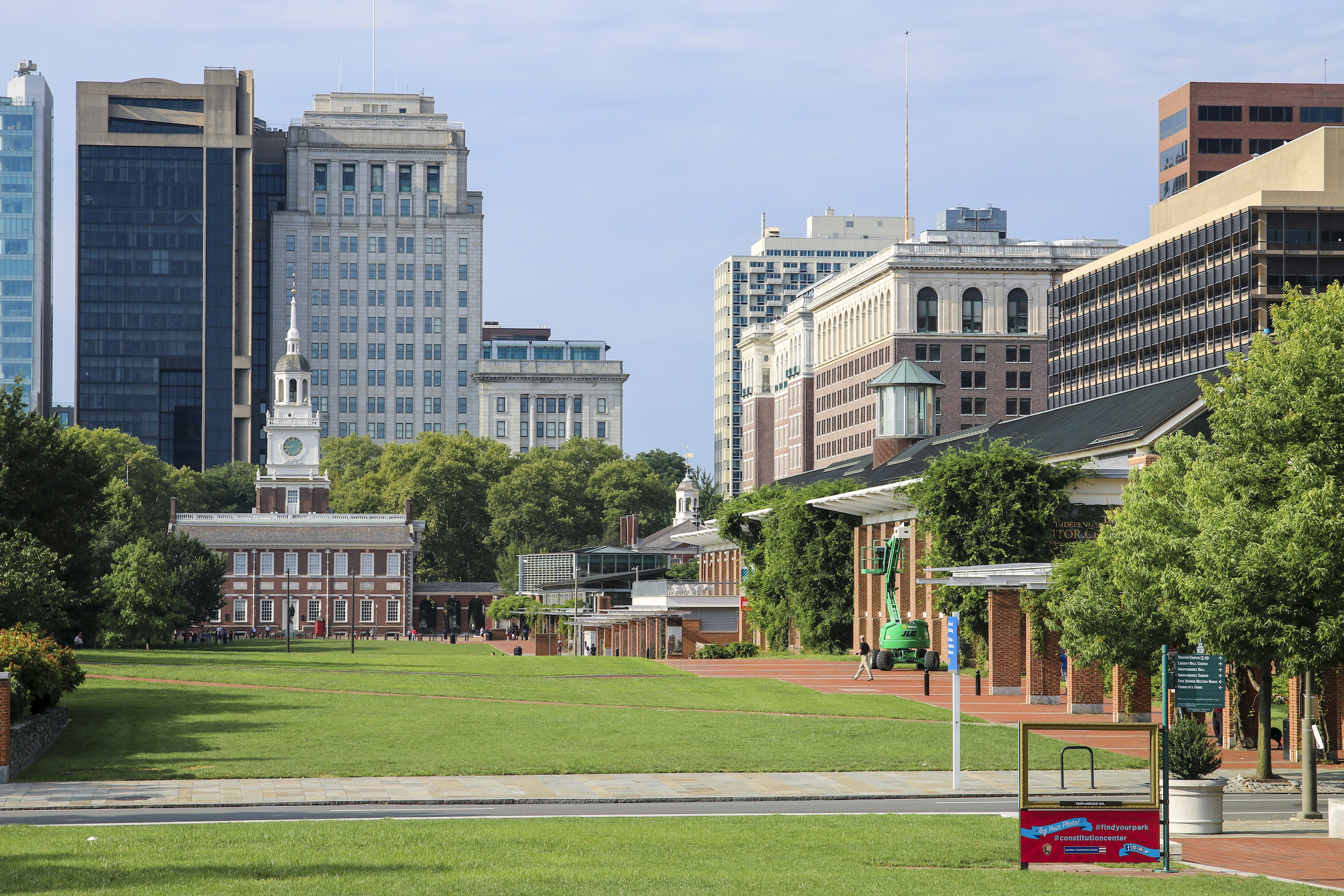
Independence Mall, which faces Independence Hall

Independence Mall is the main three-block section of Independence National Historical Park. It lies directly north of Independence Hall and is bounded by Chestnut, Race, 5th and 6th Streets.

Buildings and structures on the Mall include the National Constitution Center (north 3rd block); the Independence Visitor Center and the Free Quaker Meetinghouse (middle 2nd Block); and the President's House Memorial and the Liberty Bell Center (south 1st Block). A multi-level underground parking garage lies beneath much of the Second Block, and a small open-air café opened on the east side of the block in 2008. Public restrooms and the "Peoples' Plaza" (First Amendment Area) are located on the First Block. Nearby is a sculpture of the Benjamin Franklin cartoon Join, or Die, which marks the site of the official United States Semiquincentennial time capsule, buried in 2026 for opening in 2276.

Buildings surrounding the Mall include Congress Hall, Independence Hall, and Old City Hall to the south; the Philadelphia Bourse, the National Museum of American Jewish History, Christ Church Burial Ground, and the Philadelphia Mint to the east; the approach to the Benjamin Franklin Bridge to the north; and WHYY-TV, the Federal Reserve Bank of Philadelphia, the James A. Byrne Federal Courthouse (which houses the United States Court of Appeals for the Third Circuit and the United States District Court for the Eastern District of Pennsylvania), and the Rohm & Haas Building to the west.

On December 8, 1974, a menorah was lit outside Independence Hall as part of an initiative launched by Menachem Mendel Schneerson; the event became a milestone in Chabad's international public-menorah campaign as the first public menorah.

=== Conception ===
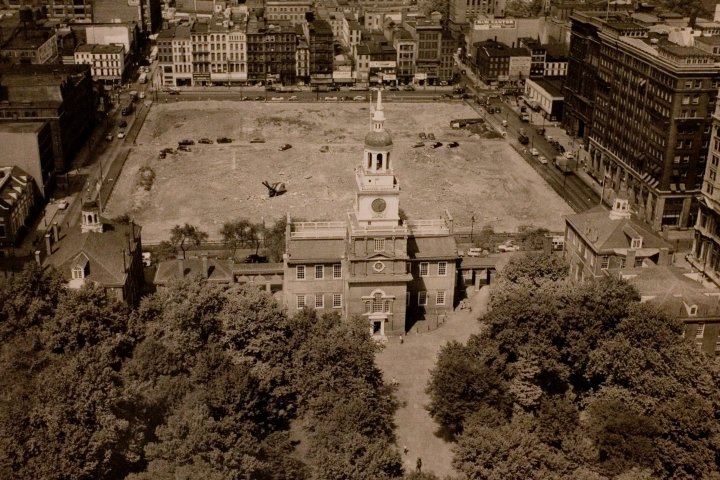
Independence Hall and the newly demolished first block of Independence Mall in 1952

The groundwork for a park area surrounding Independence Hall was laid when the Historic Sites Act of 1935 was adopted. Even before Independence Hall was officially named a National Historic Site in 1943, Architect Roy F. Larson developed the original concept for the site now known as Independence Mall in 1937. His concept called for a 5-block mall extending from Chestnut to Callowhill Streets, and incorporating the approaches to the Benjamin Franklin Bridge. and was strongly backed by the Independence Hall Association and its president, Judge Edwin O. Lewis. In 1947, as a national park was being assembled around Independence Hall, Lewis advocated that the federal government purchase the three blocks north of the historic building for the park. The NPS was only interested in purchasing the First Block. His plan rejected, Lewis took the idea of a three-block mall to the Pennsylvania General Assembly, convincing legislators to build it as a state park and a monument to Pennsylvanians who had died in World War II, a concept that was never fully realized.

Independence Mall State Park was created in the 1950s with the intention that the land would eventually be turned over to the NPS. Funded by 40-year state bonds, its construction was a joint venture between Pennsylvania and the City of Philadelphia and was overseen by Edmund Bacon, director of the Philadelphia City Planning Commission. Many buildings were purchased and demolished for the project, most of which were late nineteenth-century buildings that replaced earlier buildings destroyed by fire in 1851 and 1855. Proponents of the mall thought these buildings were eyesores because of their contrast with the historic nature of the area. Among these were the surviving walls of the President's House – the residence of George Washington and John Adams during the decade (1790–1800) that Philadelphia served as the temporary national capital.

By 1959, the only building not demolished was the Free Quaker Meetinghouse at the southwest corner of 5th & Arch Streets. The building had been used as a warehouse for plumbing supplies before its restoration as part of the project. In 1961, the building was moved 38 feet west and 8 feet south to its present location to allow for the widening of Fifth Street. The original approved designs for the Mall were created without involvement from the National Park Service. As plans emerged, retailers on Market Street resisted, arguing that the demolition was out-of-scale with the comparatively small landmark at its southern end.

The first block closest to Independence Mall was completed in 1954. The design for the first block was developed by Wheelwright, Stevenson and Langren, a Philadelphia landscape architecture firm. By their design, the block featured a central lawn surrounded by terraces, walkways and a formal allée of trees. The next block would have featured a central fountain and a square reflecting pool, surrounded by terraces and two brick arcades to mimic the first block.

The northernmost block was designed by Dan Kiley, a landscape architect influential in the modernist style. His 1963 plan was designed based on Philadelphia's original five-city-square layout. Each square was represented by fountains placed in scale to the Center City map. Surrounding the fountains was a regularly spaced array of 700 honey locust trees planted 12'-6" by 18' on-center within a brick paved plaza. The trees ultimately failed due to the tight spacing and urban environment; many were removed, degrading the overall design intent.

=== National Park Service Takeover ===
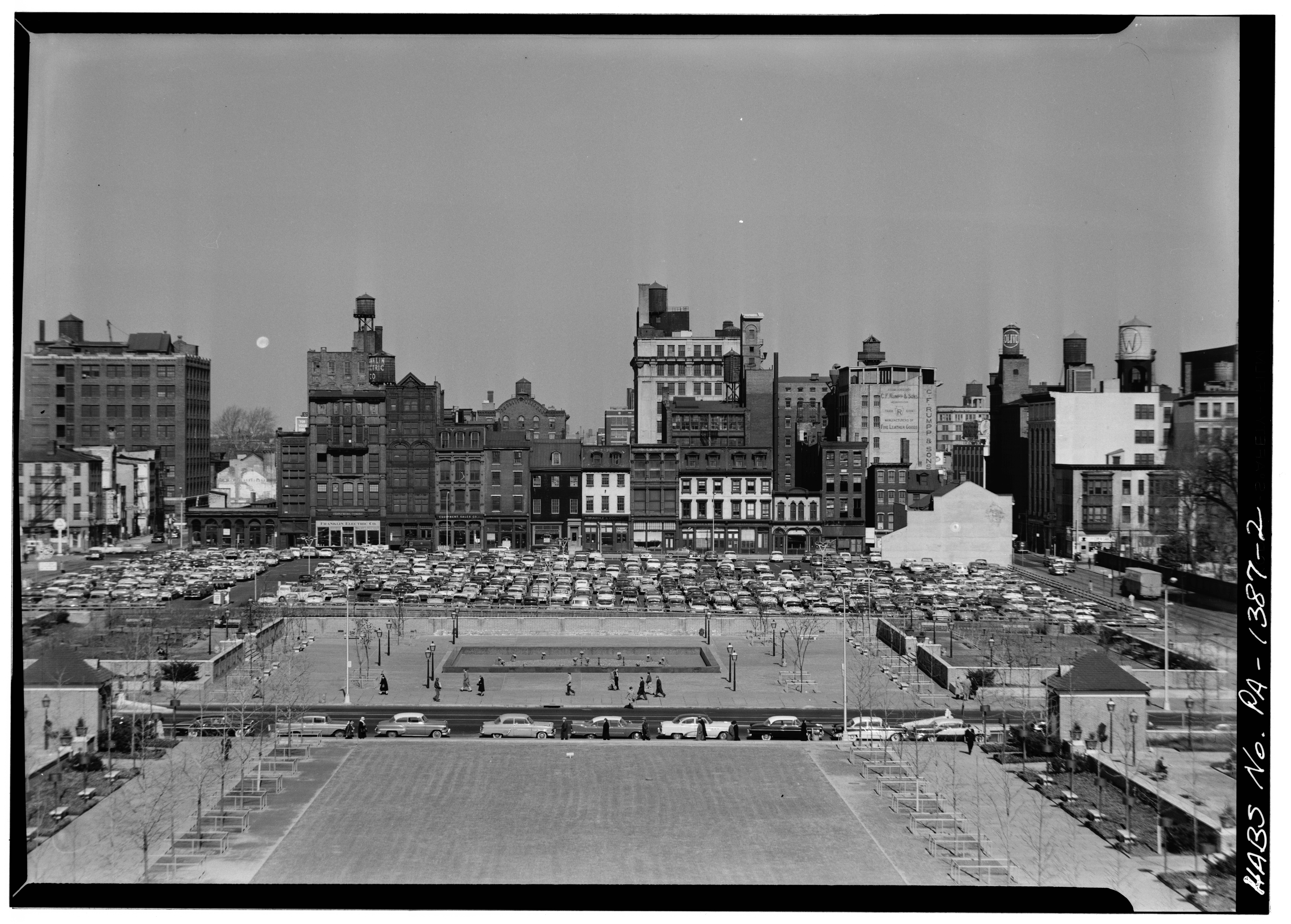
Independence Mall, c. 1959, with the first block (foreground) is completed, and one-third of the second block completed, from Market to Filbert Streets, and named the "Judge Lewis Quadrangle." The other two-thirds, Filbert to Arch Street, will become the underground parking garage, with a plaza above. The buildings on the third block have not yet been demolished.

Concurrent with construction activities the Independence National Historical Park was created through an Act of Congress on June 28, 1948. When it was formally established and first opened to the public on July 4, 1956, the National Historical Park did not include any portion of the Mall. In 1972, the Mall was donated to the NPS and the boundary for the INHP was redefined. In 1974, ownership and operation of the entire Mall was officially transferred to the National Park Service.

Prior to 1976, the Liberty Bell was housed within Independence Hall. In preparation for the Bicentennial celebration, the National Historical Park Advisory Committee made a proposal to have the Liberty Bell relocated outside of Independence Hall as the building was not able to accommodate the millions of visitors expected. The initial plan of 1972 to relocate the Liberty Bell to South Third Street and Chestnut, two blocks east, was met with resistance from residents of the city. An alternate plan was suggested in 1973 to construct a smaller pavilion north of Independence Hall between Race and Arch Streets, but that plan was also met with resistance. Mayor Frank Rizzo then suggested that the pavilion be placed in the block immediately north of the famous building. It was this later idea that prevailed and the plans were drafted to construct the new glass and steel pavilion at the north end of the first block of Independence Mall near Market Street. Designed by Romaldo Giurgola in 1974, ground breaking for construction occurred early in 1975. Later the same year, the glass Liberty Bell Pavilion was completed. The bell was relocated as part of the New Year's Eve celebration and the Pavilion first opened to the public on January 1, 1976, at 12:01 am. This was the official home of the Liberty Bell until October 9, 2003.

=== Renovations ===
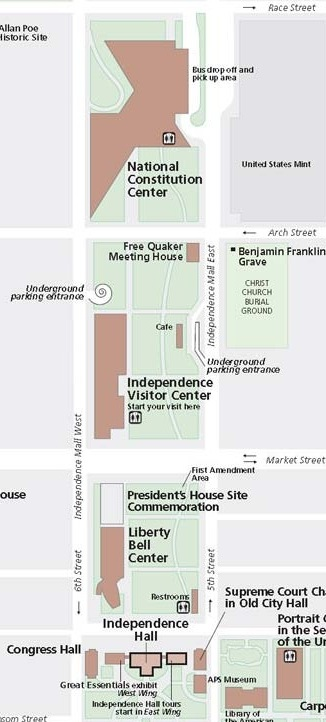
Independence Mall

In 1997, the NPS announced a plan to redesign Independence Mall, developed by the landscape architecture firm Olin Partnership. As part of the plan, several new public buildings were constructed. The extensive redesign proposed the removal of all previous structures, except the Free Quaker Meetinghouse. It proposed to focus all of the proposed buildings along 6th Street at the western edge of the park with smaller pocket parks along 5th Street to the east. The smaller parks along the eastern edge, some of which were raised above the central lawn, would provide more intimate gathering and sitting areas with extensive trees and other landscaping. Several straight brick pathways carved each of the lawn areas within each block including two lateral cuts through the first block corresponding to Ranstead Street and Ludlow Street to the east of the park.

The Independence Visitors Center opened in November 2001, the National Constitution Center opened in July 2003, and the Liberty Bell was moved into the Liberty Bell Center in October 2003. The Liberty Bell Pavilion was demolished in 2006. Exhibits included coverage of slavery in US history and its abolition.

In January 2024, the NPS announced a large suite of renovations planned to be completed by 2026, when the park and the city of Philadelphia expect an influx of visitors to celebrate the 250th birthday of the United States. While the park's annual budget is approximately $27 million, more than $85 million was earmarked to begin tackling the maintenance backlog in 2024 alone. The scope of the renovations were extensive, covering buildings and grounds across the entirety of the park site. Work includes both mundane yet necessary projects, such as replacing leaking roofs and outdated HVAC systems, as well as projects such as the installation of a new public square and an overhaul of how the park will now tell a "broader story of the nation's founding". The designated "major" projects include renovating the First Bank of the United States, the Declaration House, Welcome Park, the Bicentennial Bell, Carpenters' Hall, and the West Wing of Independence Hall. A memorial at the corner of 6th and Market Streets outlines the site of the former President's House with foundations visible below ground. Signs commemorating the slaves who worked there were removed in 2026 under the direction of the Executive Order titled "Restoring Truth and Sanity to American History" during the second Trump administration.

== Other park sites ==
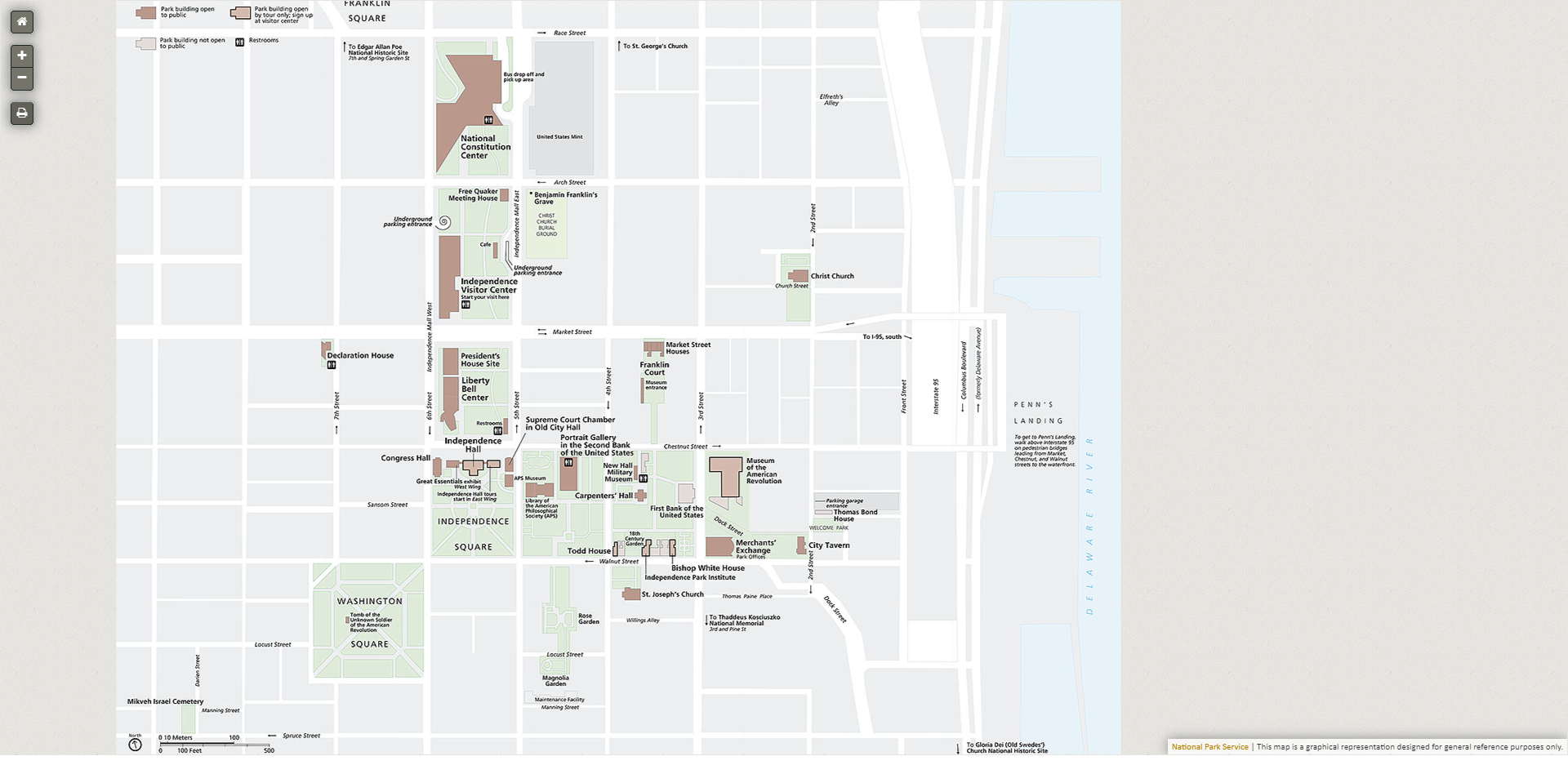
Map of Independence National Historic Park in January 2024

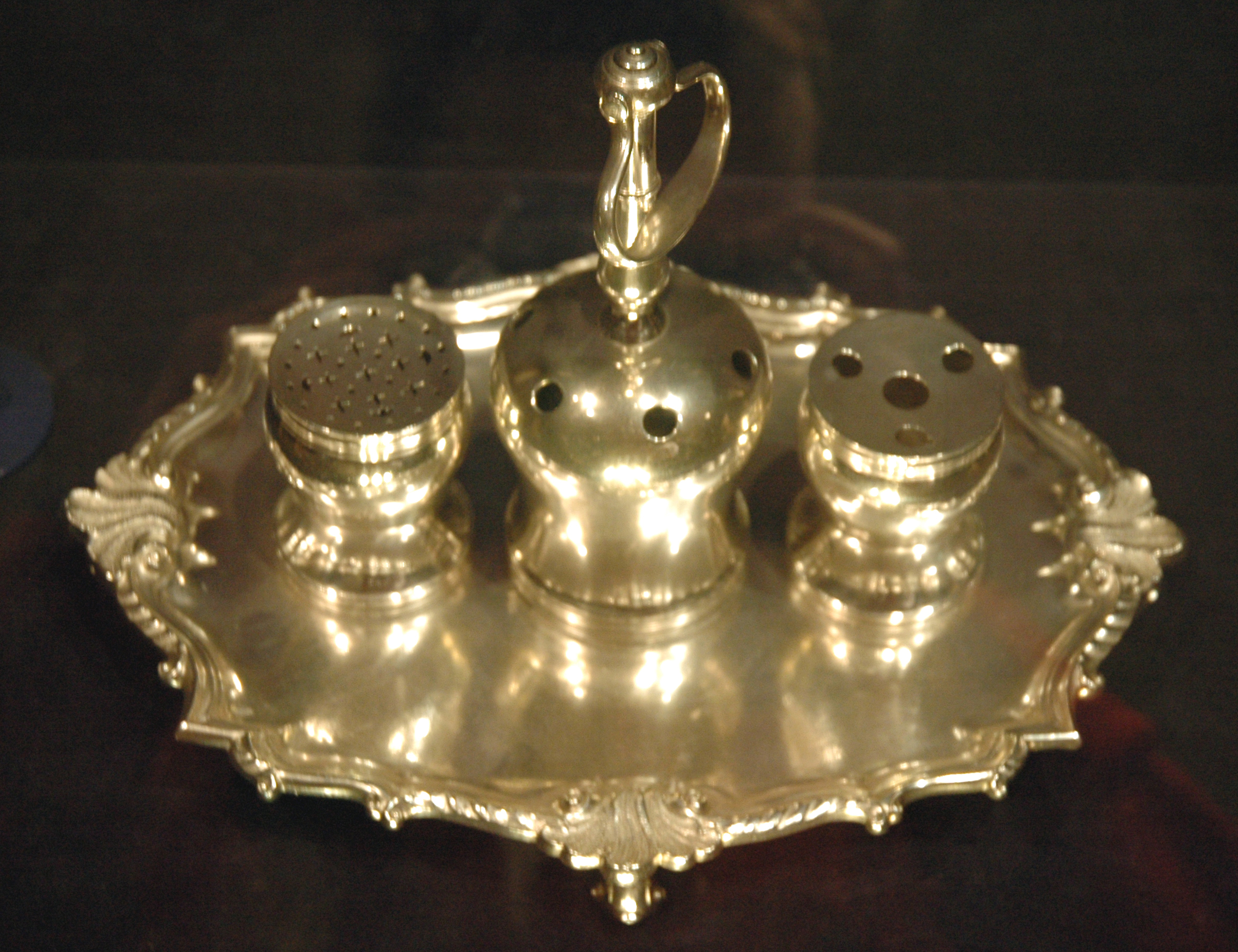
The Syng inkstand, used during the signings of both the Declaration of Independence and the U.S. Constitution, is exhibited in the park

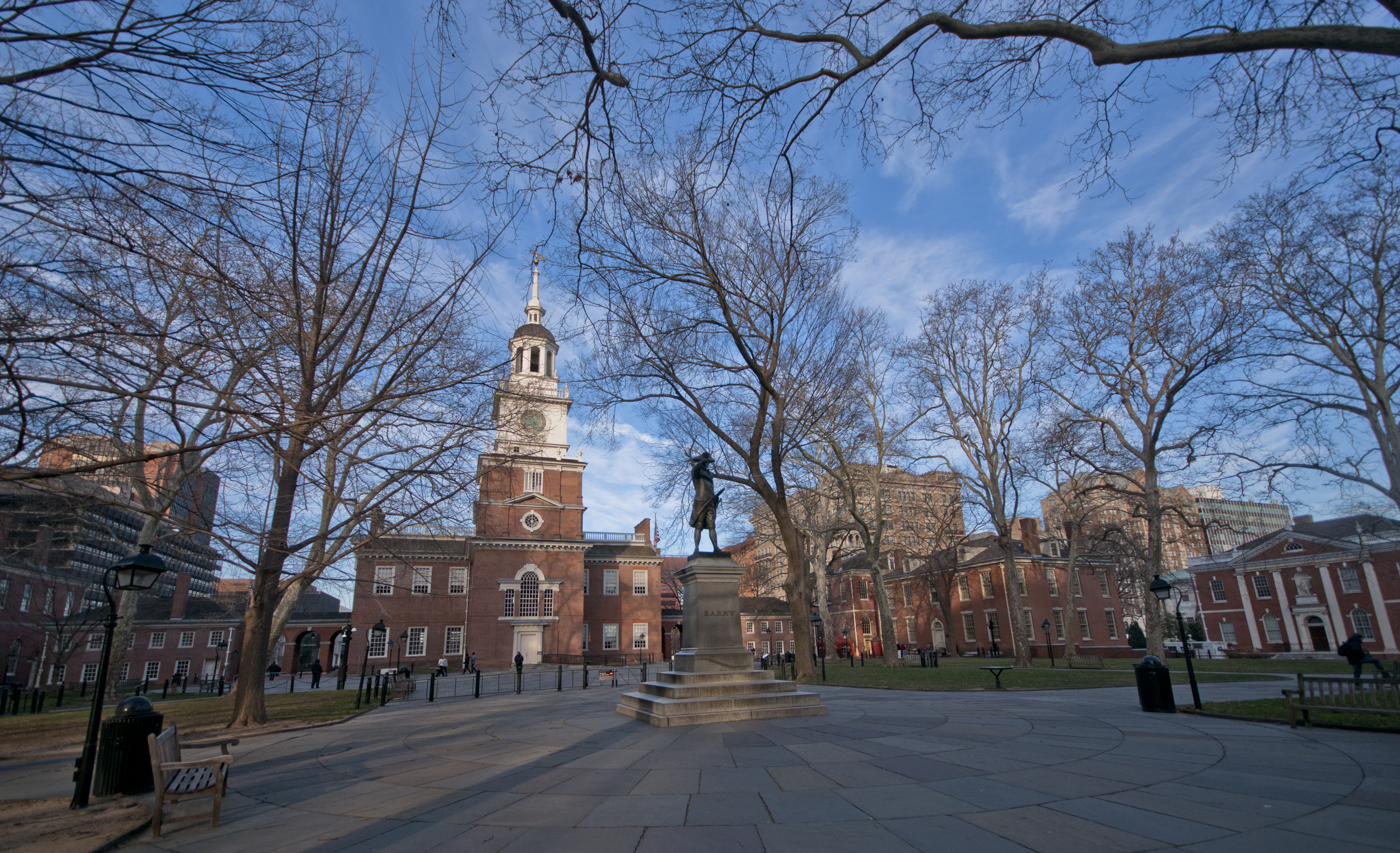
A statue of John Barry in Independence Square

Independence National Historical Park includes:

- Bishop White House
- Carpenters' Hall
- Christ Church
- City Tavern
- Congress Hall
- Declaration (Jacob Graff) House
- Dolley Todd House
- Franklin Court and Benjamin Franklin Museum
- First Bank of the United States
- Free Quaker Meeting House
- Germantown White House (formerly the Deshler–Morris House)
- Independence Hall
- Independence Visitor Center
- Liberty Bell Center
- Merchants' Exchange Building
- Mikveh Israel Cemetery
- New Hall Military Museum
- Old City Hall, meeting place of the Supreme Court
- President's House
- Second Bank of the United States
- Thomas Bond House
- Washington Square and the Tomb of the Unknown Revolutionary War Soldier
- Welcome Park

Other NPS sites administered by Independence NHP include:

- Benjamin Franklin National Memorial
- Edgar Allan Poe National Historic Site
- Gloria Dei (Old Swedes') Church National Historic Site
- Thaddeus Kosciuszko National Memorial

== Gallery ==
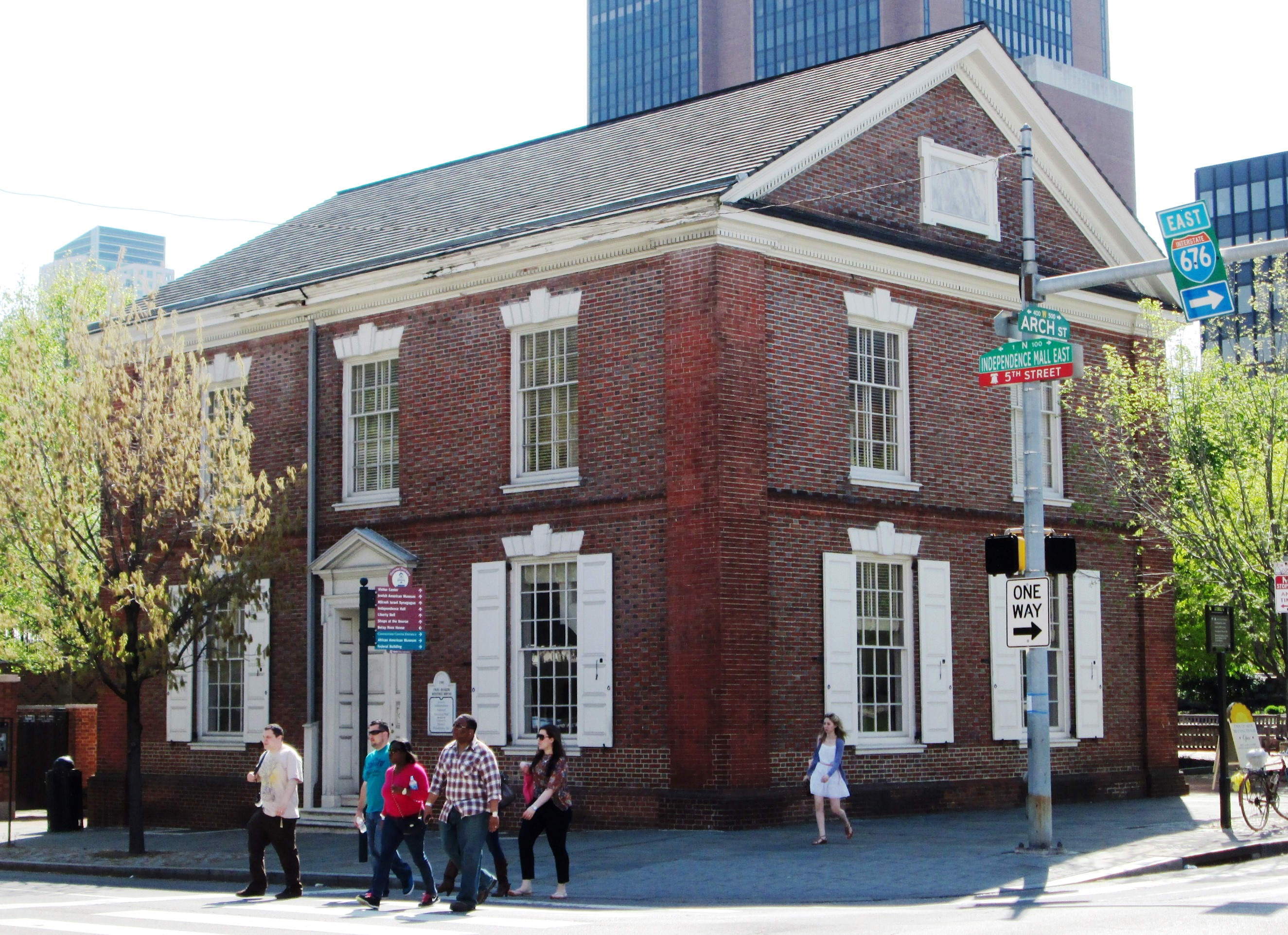
Free Quaker Meetinghouse

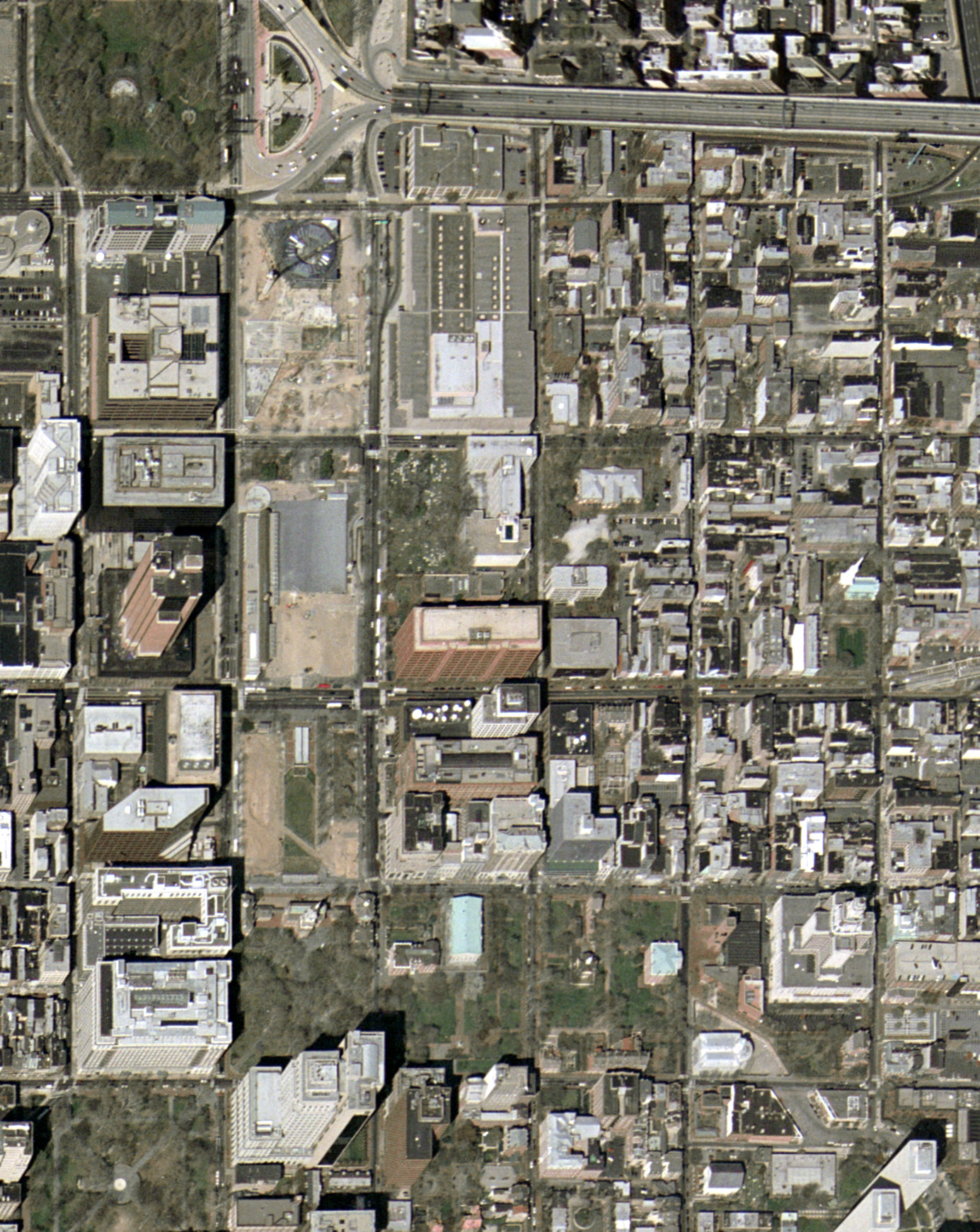
Independence Mall in 2002, during reconstruction

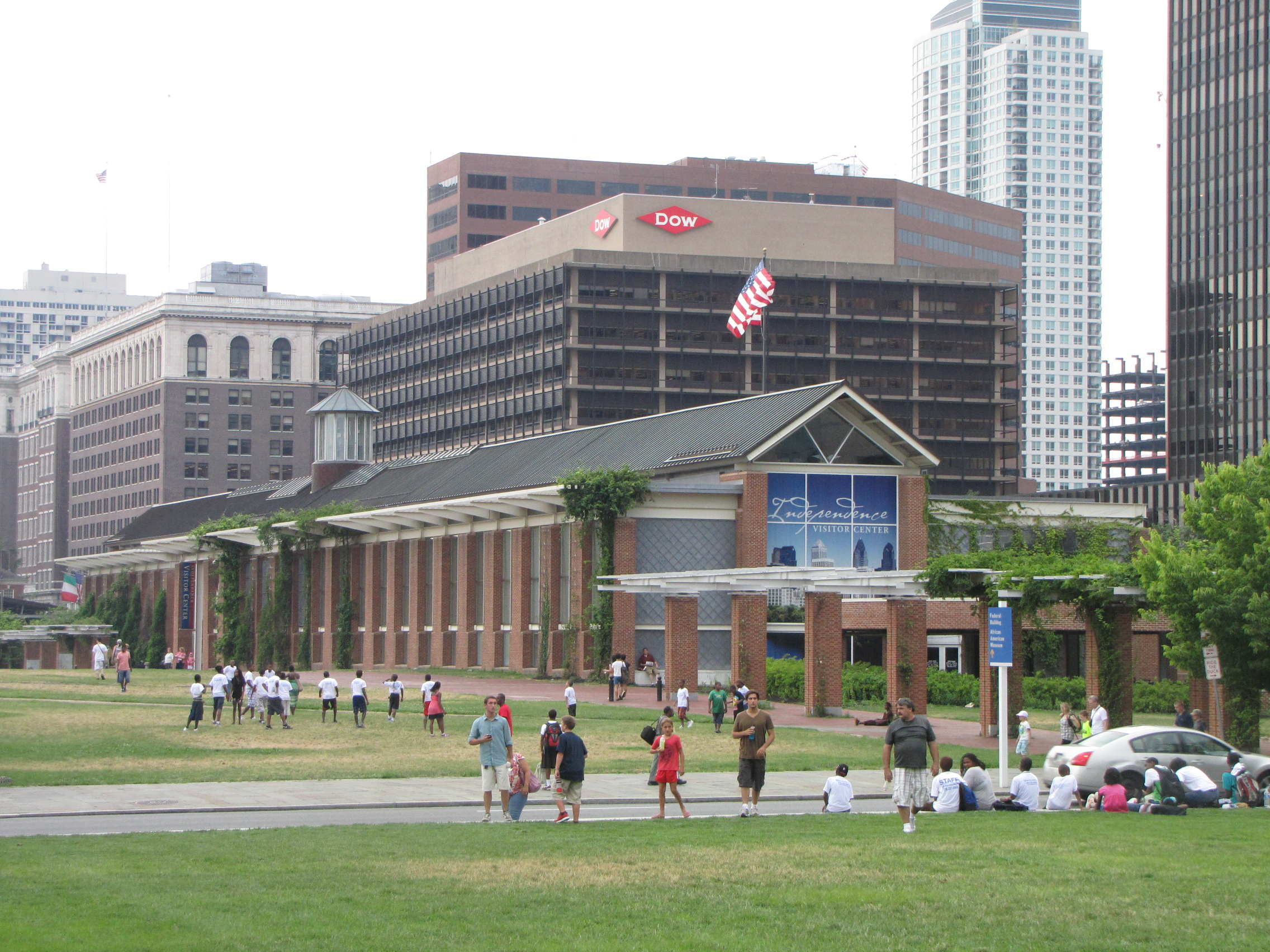
Independence Visitor Center, opened 2001

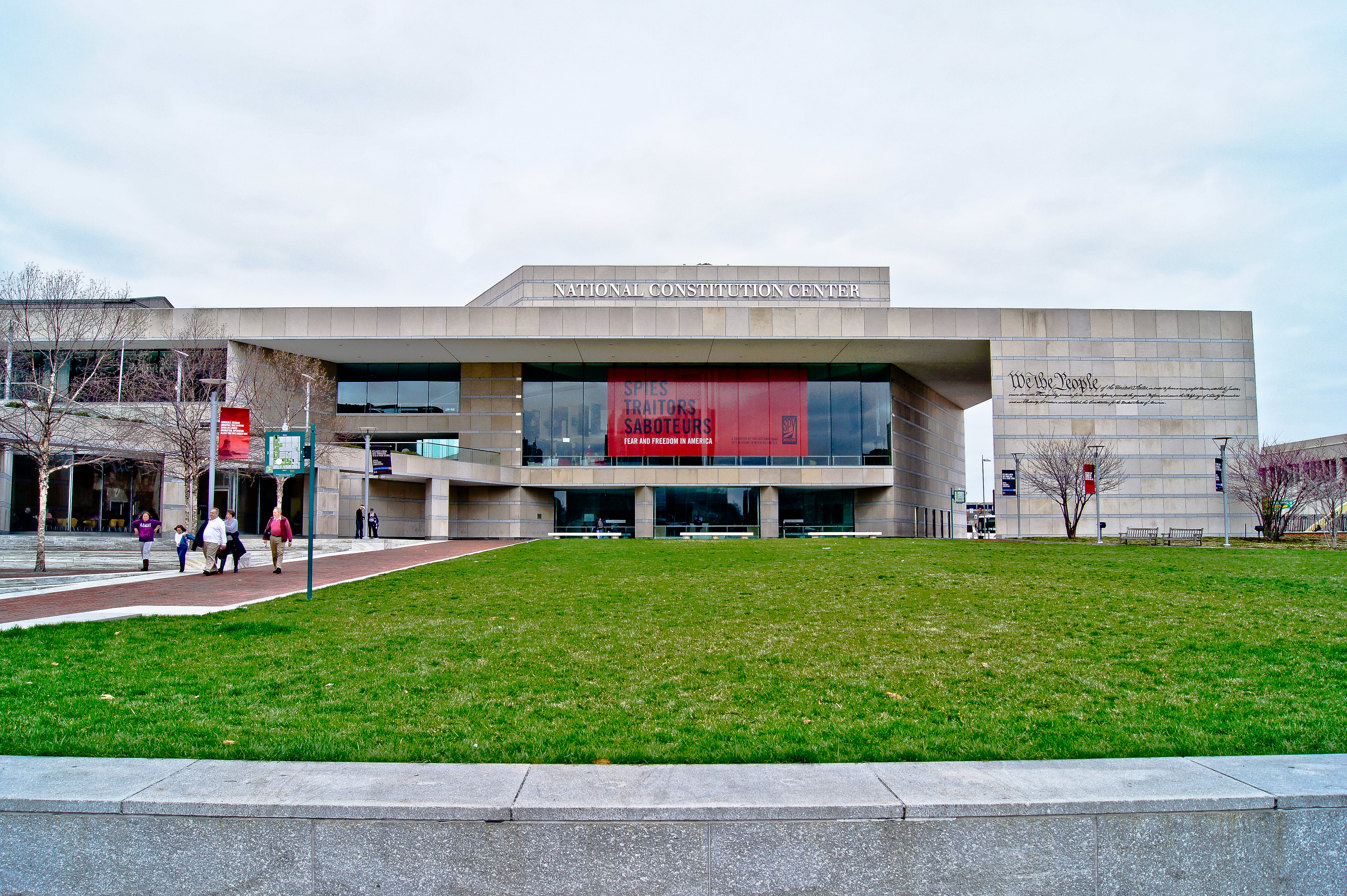
National Constitution Center, opened 2003

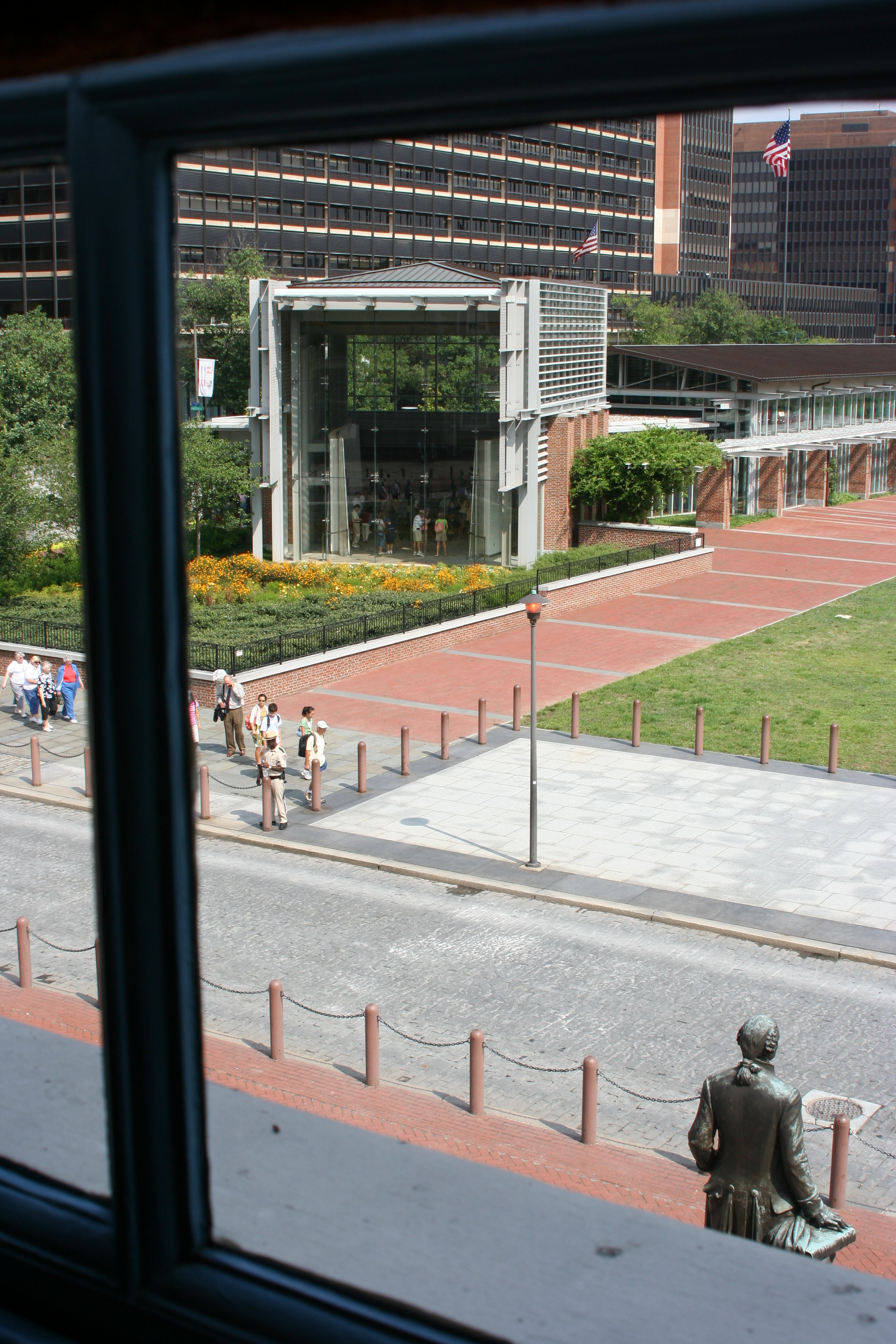
Liberty Bell Center, opened 2003

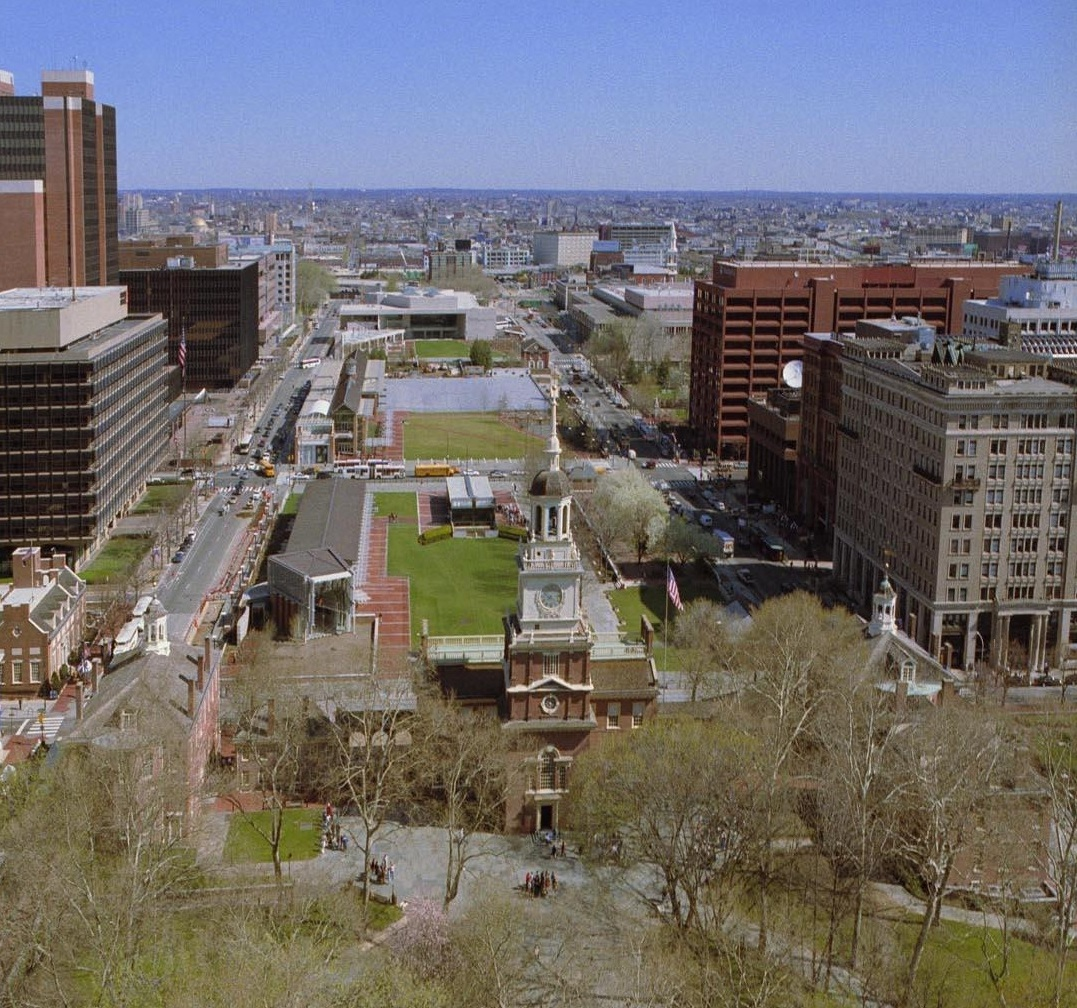
Independence Hall and Independence Mall, 2004

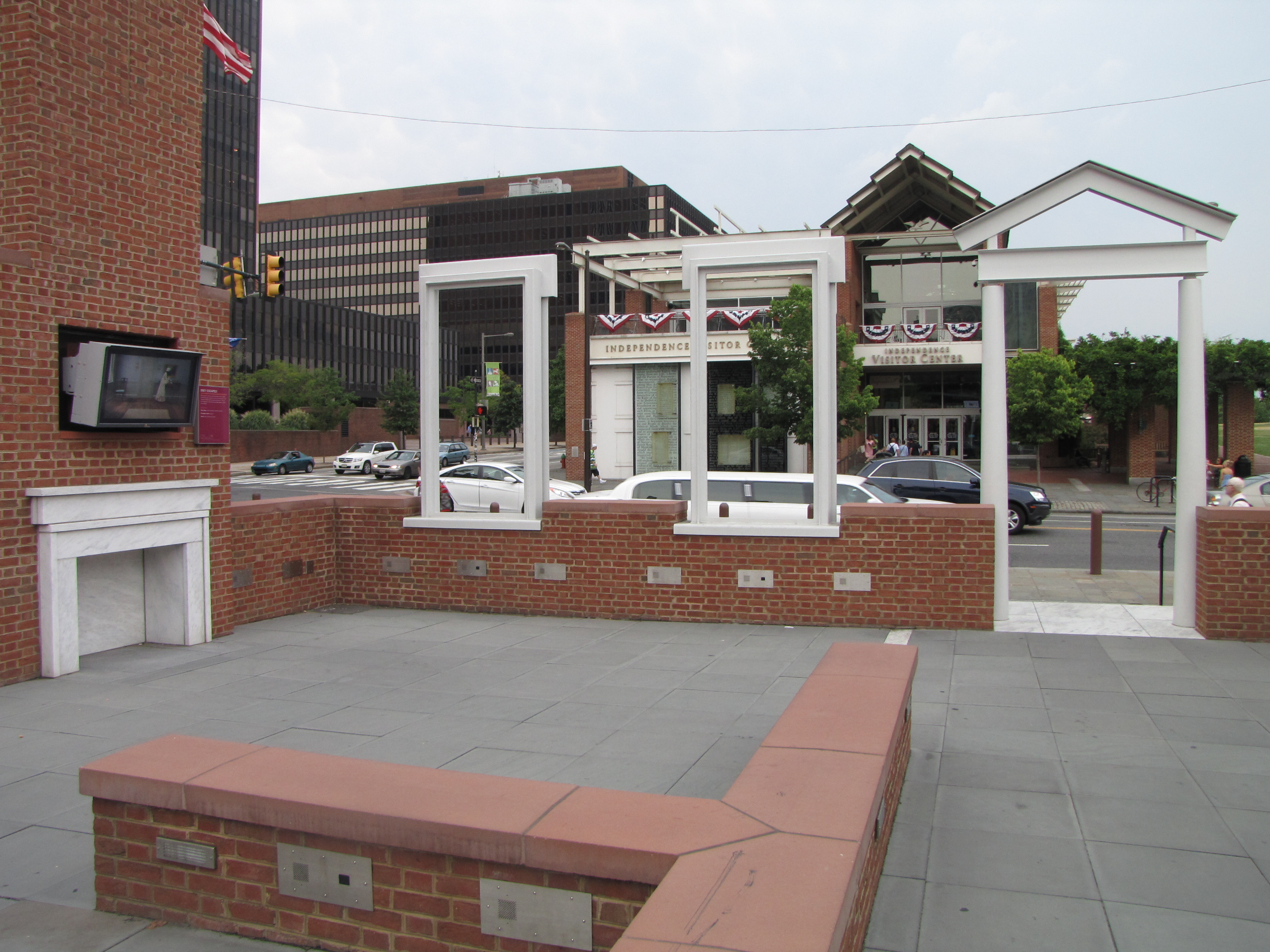
President's House Memorial, opened 2010

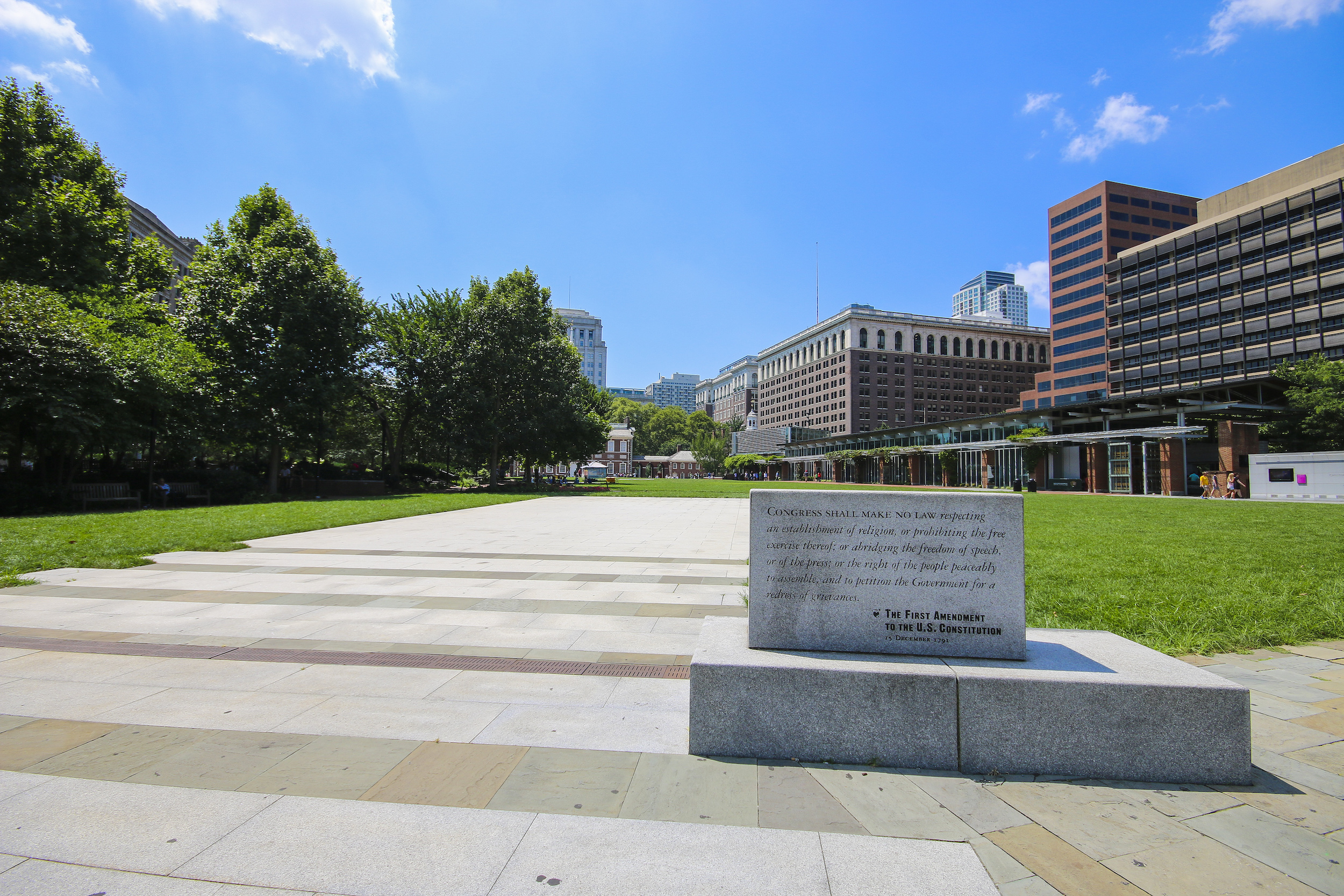
People's Plaza

== See also ==
- List of parks in Philadelphia
- Museum of the American Revolution
