= List of houses in Fairmount Park =

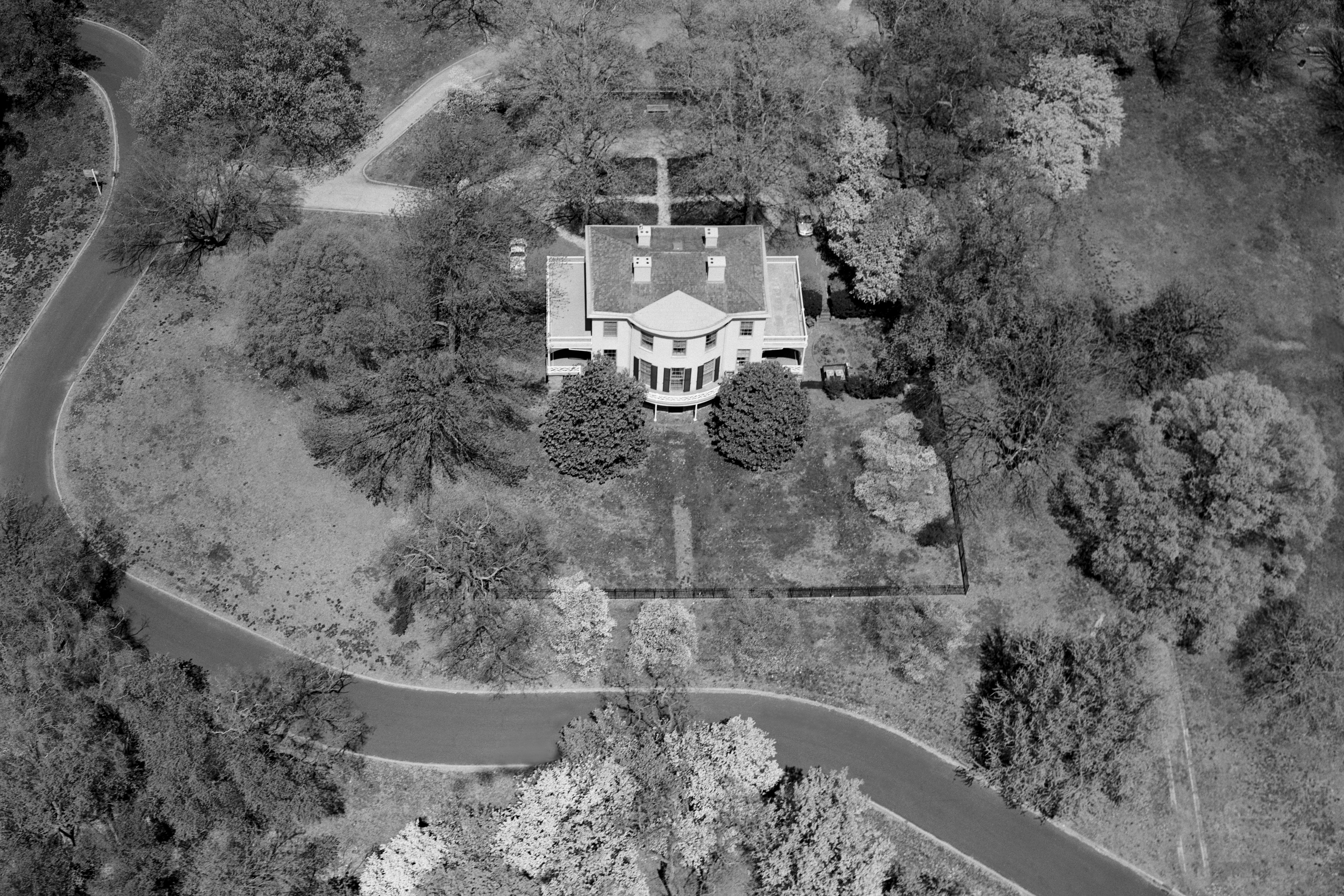
Aerial view of Lemon Hill Mansion

This list contains all of the extant historic houses located in Fairmount Park in Philadelphia, Pennsylvania. Most of the houses are referred to as mansions due to their size and use as the summer country estates of Philadelphia's affluent citizens in the 18th and 19th centuries. During that period, the city's only developed areas were located several miles away to the southeast along the Delaware River, making the current park areas along the Schuylkill River an ideal refuge from epidemics during the summer months. The mansions were built between 1742 (Belmont Mansion) and 1810 (Rockland), in various architectural styles including Colonial Revival, Federal, Georgian, Gothic Revival, Greek Revival, and Palladian, with some in combinations of those styles.

There are 19 extant historic houses of which 16 were constructed within the current boundaries of Fairmount Park, while three of the houses were moved to the park from elsewhere in the city—Cedar Grove Mansion from Frankford, Hatfield House from Nicetown, and Letitia Street House from Old City. All of the 19 houses were designed and used as private residences. The Cliffs Mansion, located in east park, has been left in ruins since a 1986 fire caused by arson. Other historic houses were demolished due to extensive deterioration, vandalism, fire damage or insufficient funds for restoration. Demolished houses are not included in this list.

Three additional historic park buildings were designed like residential houses though they were never intended to be used as private residences: the Ohio House—built by the Ohio delegation for the Centennial Exposition; the Shofuso Japanese House—built in Japan as a museum exhibit for display at MoMA, then relocated to Fairmount Park; and the Smith Memorial Playhouse—designed, and still used, as an indoor play area for children.

This list does not include the historic boathouses on Boathouse Row which were designed as sporting clubhouses rather than residential homes. The historic houses within the adjacent Wissahickon Valley Park are also not included though that park was previously within the Fairmount Park system. Since 2010, all park areas and facilities are administered separately after the merger of the Fairmount Park Commission and the Department of Recreation into the new Philadelphia Parks & Recreation department.

The Fairmount Park Conservancy's Historic Preservation Trust, in collaboration with the city of Philadelphia, offers long-term leasing of some historic houses to civic organizations and businesses. The lessees must commit to rehabilitate and maintain the buildings, without altering their historic architectural features, while allowing public access. The trust offers assistance to prospective lessees in assessing feasibility, identifying financial incentives, and managing rehabilitation and maintenance work.

Note: the general Fairmount Park National Register of Historic Places (NRHP) listing date of February 7, 1972, is entered for all sites with no individual designation record; ~ is entered for Style and Architect when unknown.

Image	Name	Years (*circa)	Park district	Location	Adjacent neighborhood	NRHP	Style	Architect	Notes	Refs
more images	Belmont Mansion	1742–45*	west park, central	2000 Belmont Mansion Dr; 39°59′27″N 75°12′47″W	Wynnefield	February 7, 1972	Palladian	William Peters (owner)	museum; events (Note: Belmont: reopened in 2007 as The Underground Railroad Museum at Belmont Mansion after extensive renovations)	
more images	Boelson Cottage	1678–84	west park, central	2110 Martin Luther King Jr. Dr; 39°59′23″N 75°12′11″W	Wynnefield	February 7, 1972	Dutch, Swedish	~	offices (Note: Boelson Cottage: a.k.a. John Boelson House, among many alternatives; oldest extant house in the park; renovated 1989–90)	
more images	Cedar Grove Mansion	1748–50	west park, south	1 Cedar Grove Dr; 39°58′45″N 75°12′16″W	Parkside	February 7, 1972	Federal	~	tours (Note: Cedar Grove: moved from Frankford, 1926–28; administered by the Philadelphia Museum of Art)	
more images	Chamounix Mansion	1802, 1853*	west park, north	3250 Chamounix Dr; 40°00′14″N 75°11′47″W	Wynnefield Heights	April 26, 1972	Federal	~	youth hostel (Note: Chamounix: nearly doubled in size, c.1853; appropriated by the state for public use, 1867; nearly demolished after a fire; operated as a youth hostel since 1964)	
more images	The Cliffs Mansion	1753	east park, south	3400 Reservoir Dr; 39°58′46″N 75°11′39″W	Brewerytown	March 16, 1972	Georgian	~	ruins (Note: The Cliffs: home of Joshua Fisher, the great-grandfather of Joseph Wharton; left as a ruins since a 1986 fire caused by arson; covered by graffiti)	
more images	Hatfield House	1760*, 1838*, 1850*	east park, south	3201 W Girard Ave; 39°58′33″N 75°11′18″W	Brewerytown	March 16, 1972	Colonial Revival, Greek Revival	~	access unknown (Note: Hatfield: enlarged and remodeled, 1838; porches added, 1850; moved from Hunting Park Ave near Pulaski Ave in Nicetown, 1930)	
more images	Laurel Hill Mansion	1767*, 1800*, 1846	east park, north	7201 Edgeley Dr; 39°59′29″N 75°11′42″W	Strawberry Mansion	March 24, 1972	Georgian, Federal	~	tours; events (Note: Laurel Hill: once owned by Philip Syng Physick, whose daughter inherited it and named it the Randolph House; renamed Laurel Hill Mansion in 1976; additions in c.1800, 1846; maintained by the nonprofit Women for Greater Philadelphia)	
more images	Lemon Hill Mansion	1800*	east park, south	1 Lemon Hill Dr; 39°58′15″N 75°11′14″W	Fairmount	February 7, 1972	Federal	Henry Pratt (owner)	tours (Note: Lemon Hill: Henry Pratt's summer home on land acquired from Robert Morris, including gardens and a greenhouse with lemon trees; maintained as a house museum by the Colonial Dames of America and the Friends of Lemon Hill)	
more images	Letitia Street House	1713*	west park, south	3401 Girard Ave; 39°58′31″N 75°11′49″W	Parkside	February 7, 1972	Georgian	~	access unknown (Note: Letitia Street House: moved from Letitia St. in Old City, 1883; was promoted as a home of William Penn until the claim was disproved; restored by the city and leased by the Centennial Parkside Community Development Corporation)	
more images	The Lilacs House	1711*, 1832	west park, north	3600 Greenland Dr; 39°59′55″N 75°11′47″W	Wynnefield Heights	February 7, 1972	~	~	access unknown (Note: The Lilacs House: a.k.a. The Lilacs, and Lilac House; named for the many lilac bushes found there; farmhouse of Morten Garret; built in two main sections: a southern section c.1711, and a northern section in 1832; a halfway house for juveniles in the 1990s; currently leased by Outward Bound)	
more images	Mount Pleasant Mansion	1761–65*	east park, central	3800 Mount Pleasant Dr; 39°59′00″N 75°11′59″W	Strawberry Mansion	October 15, 1966	Georgian	Thomas Nevell, apprentice of Edmund Woolley	NHL; tours (Note: Mount Pleasant: built for a Scottish privateer; later owners included Benedict Arnold and Jonathan Williams, a grandnephew of Benjamin Franklin; administered by the Philadelphia Museum of Art; being renovated)	
more images	Ohio House	1876	west park, central	1700 Belmont Ave; 39°59′06″N 75°12′58″W	Wynnefield	February 7, 1972	Gothic Revival	~	café (Note: Ohio House: a.k.a. Ohio State Building; built from various Ohio sandstones for the Centennial Exposition—the only extant state exhibit; has functioned as a café, event venue and offices)	
more images	Ormiston Mansion	1798	east park, central	2000 Reservoir Dr; 39°59′19″N 75°11′47″W	Strawberry Mansion	February 7, 1972	Georgian	Edward Burd (owner)	occasional tours/events (Note: Ormiston: named for the Scottish estate of the owner's grandfather, Colonel James Burd; maintained by the Royal Heritage Society of the Delaware Valley; ongoing restoration)	
more images	Ridgeland Mansion	1752–62*	west park, north	4100 Chamounix Dr; 39°59′33″N 75°12′37″W	Wynnefield Heights	February 7, 1972	Federal	~	events (Note: Ridgeland: maintained by the Cancer Support Community of Greater Philadelphia (lessee) and the Fairmount Park Conservancy's Historic Preservation Trust)	
more images	Rockland Mansion	1810*	east park, central	3810 Mount Pleasant Dr; 39°59′09″N 75°11′59″W	Strawberry Mansion	February 7, 1972	Federal	~	offices (Note: Rockland: restored and maintained by Psychoanalytic Center of Philadelphia (lessee) and the Fairmount Park Conservancy's Historic Preservation Trust)	
more images	Sedgeley Porter's House	1799–1802	east park, south	3250 Sedgeley Dr; 39°58′28″N 75°11′20″W	Fairmount	February 7, 1972	Gothic Revival	Benjamin Henry Latrobe	Outward Bound (Note: Sedgeley Porter's House: expanded from both ends at an unknown date using different color and pattern of stonework; maintained by Outward Bound (lessee) and the Fairmount Park Conservancy's Historic Preservation Trust)	
more images	Shofuso Japanese House	1953	west park, south	4301 Lansdowne Dr; 39°58′53″N 75°12′46″W	Parkside	February 7, 1972	Shoin-zukuri	Junzō Yoshimura	tours (Note: Shofuso: house was built in Japan, exhibited in New York, then moved to Fairmount Park in 1958; maintained by the Japan America Society of Greater Philadelphia)	
more images	Smith Memorial Playhouse	1897–99	east park, central	3500 Reservoir Dr; 39°58′54″N 75°11′44″W	Strawberry Mansion	~	~	James H. Windrim	indoor play area (Note: Smith Memorial Playhouse: maintained by a nonprofit called Smith Memorial Playgrounds since 2004 when the original Smith trust's interest became insufficient for daily operations; used as a public indoor play area for young children)	
more images	The Solitude Mansion	1784–85	west park, south	3400 W Girard Ave; 39°58′21″N 75°11′44″W	Parkside	February 7, 1972	Federal	John Penn (owner)	in the zoo (Note: The Solitude: home of John Penn, a grandson of William Penn; located inside the Philadelphia Zoo; maintained by the zoo)	
more images	Strawberry Mansion	1783–89*, 1828*	east park, north	2450 Strawberry Mansion Dr; 39°59′39″N 75°11′26″W	Strawberry Mansion	February 7, 1972	Federal, Greek Revival	~	tours; events (Note: Strawberry: William Lewis's Summerville Mansion; Greek Revival wings added by Joseph Hemphill, c.1828; name changed when strawberries were sold by renting farmers, 1846–67; maintained by a nonprofit called The Committee of 1926)	
more images	Sweetbriar Mansion	1797	west park, south	3801 Lansdowne Dr; 39°58′37″N 75°12′03″W	Parkside	February 7, 1972	Federal	~	closed (Note: Sweetbriar: built for Samuel Breck; named for the roses that grew there; restored by the Junior League, 1932; restored by the city, 1976; maintained by the Modern Club, 1939–2014; currently closed, awaiting a new lessee tenant)	
more images	Woodford Mansion	1756–58, 1771–72*, 1790*	east park, north	3400 Woodford Dr; 39°59′36″N 75°11′16″W	Strawberry Mansion	December 24, 1967	Georgian, Palladian	~	NHL; tours (Note: Woodford: home of William Coleman, a close friend of Benjamin Franklin; 2nd floor added c.1771–72; kitchen wing added c.1790; other owners included David Franks and Isaac Wharton, a son of Joseph (b.1707); maintained by the Naomi Wood Trust)	

== See also ==
- List of National Historic Landmarks in Philadelphia – includes Mount Pleasant and Woodford Mansions
- National Register of Historic Places listings in Philadelphia – includes The Cliffs, Hatfield House, Laurel Hill, Mount Pleasant and Woodford Mansions
- Philadelphia Register of Historic Places
