= Stiffel Senior Center =

Stiffel Senior Center (1985-2011)
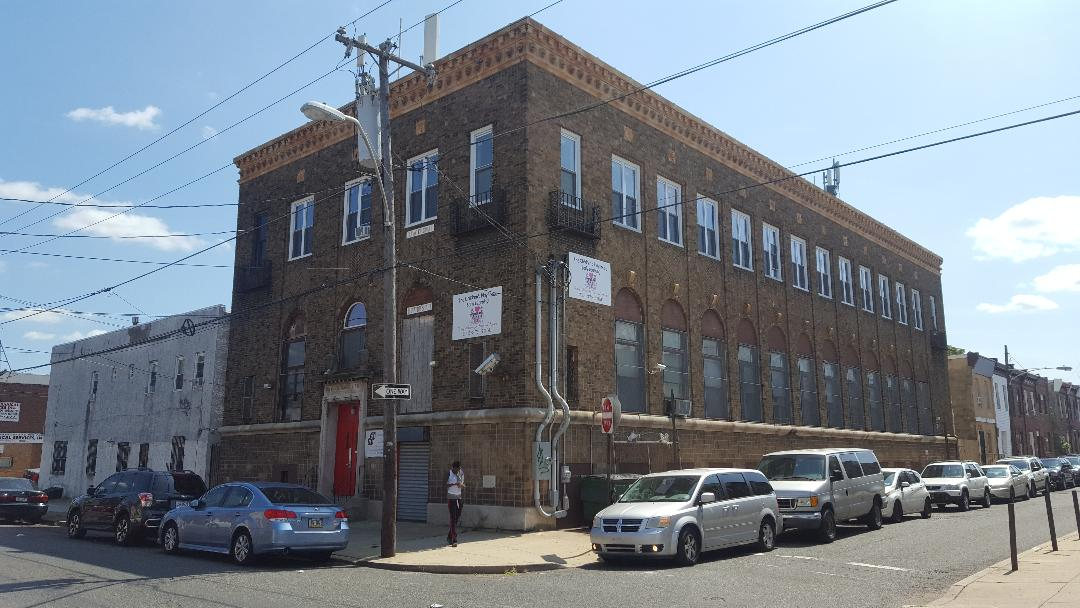
- 604 W Porter St on September 1, 2019
- Former names: Jewish Education Center #2 (1928-1953); Neighborhood Center South (1953-1965); JYC Multi Service Center (1965-1985)

General information
- Architectural style: Beaux-Arts influenced
- Location: 604 W Porter St, Philadelphia, Pennsylvania 19148, United States
- Coordinates: 39.917644°N 75.158171°W
- Construction started: June 1928
- Completed: September 1928
- Cost: $170,000 (1928)

Height
- Height: 41 ft (12 m)

Technical details
- Floor count: 2

Design and construction
- Architect: Frank E. Hahn

The Jacob and Ester Stiffel Senior Center of the Jewish Community Centers of Philadelphia (the 'Stiffel Center') opened in 1928 as Jewish Education Center No. 2 (Hebrew: תלמוד תורה) at the southeast corner of Marshall and Porter Streets in South Philadelphia. The Center was funded by Jewish Federation of Greater Philadelphia. The neighborhood's Jewish population aged, and the Federation closed the building in 2011 and sold it in 2013.

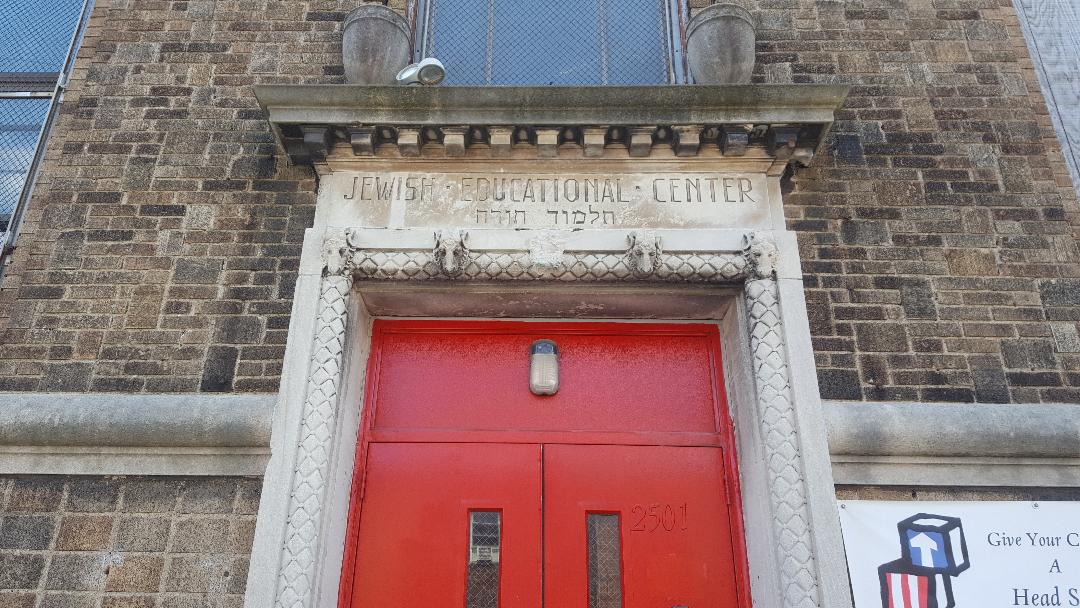
Front door at 604 W Porter St on September 1, 2019

The original Jewish Education Center offered free religious and Hebrew instruction as well as recreational activities. South Philadelphia's Jewish population aged in the late 1960s and the Center evolved its programming for its aging population.

The Stiffel Senior Center offered education and social programs, served kosher hot meals, and provided other resources for its aging members. The Stiffel Center was supporting 225 elderly Jewish neighbors in 1989. Before its closing, the Center was serving approximately 500 neighborhood community members of whom 150 were Jewish.

In May 2011, the Jewish Federation of Greater Philadelphia voted to close the Stiffel Center due to the Center's increasing costs in maintaining the aging building. Federation reported losing $200,000 a year on the building and another $400,000 was needed to fix repair structural issues. The Federation sold the building in 2013 for $325,000 to Temple Housing Association in Jackson, New Jersey.

In October 2012, the Stiffel Center organization merged with the Klein JCC to create a single agency.

On June 14, 2013, the Philadelphia Historical Commission added the building to the Philadelphia Register of Historic Places, protecting it from inappropriate alterations and unnecessary demolition.
