= Letitia Street House =

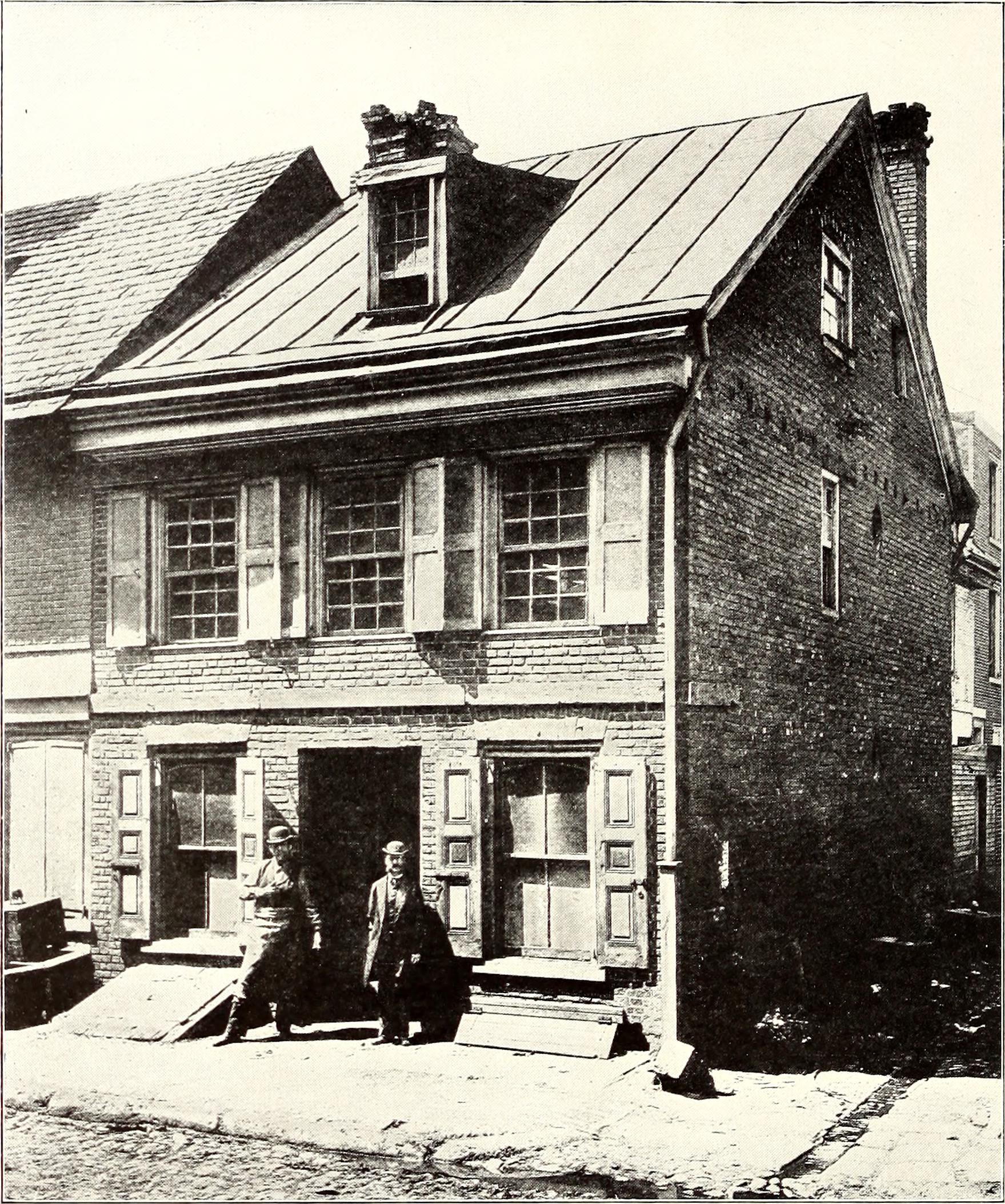
- Letitia Street House, in its original location.
- Interactive map of the Letitia Street House area
- Alternative names: Rising Sun Inn; Woolpack Hotel

General information
- Type: Residential
- Architectural style: Early Georgian
- Location: Original location: Letitia Street & Black Horse Alley, Philadelphia, Pennsylvania Current location: Lansdowne Drive, West Fairmount Park, Philadelphia, Pennsylvania, United States
- Coordinates: Original location: 39°56′56.7″N 75°8′35.3″W Current location: 39°58′31.5″N 75°11′49″W
- Completed: c. 1713
- Relocated: 1883
- Renovated: 1931-32
- Owner: Thomas Chalkley (1715)

Height
- Tip: 38 ft (11.6 m) with chimney
- Roof: 34 ft (10 m)

Dimensions
- Other dimensions: Width: 20.25 ft (6.17 m); Depth: 30 ft (9.1 m)

Design and construction
- Architects: John Smart, carpenter (attributed)

Renovating team
- Architects: Fiske Kimball; Erling H. Pedersen

Letitia Street House is a modest eighteenth-century house in West Fairmount Park, Philadelphia. It was built along the Delaware riverfront about 1713, and relocated to its current site in 1883. The house was once celebrated as the city residence of Pennsylvania's founder, William Penn (1644–1718); however, later historical research determined that he never lived there.

== History ==
=== William Penn ===
King Charles II granted William Penn a royal charter for a 26-million-acre (110,000 km^{2}) tract of land – west of New Jersey and north of Maryland – on which to develop an English colony. Penn and a group of Quaker families arrived at the Philadelphia settlement in October 1682. He and his wife, Gulielmas Springetts (1644–1696), had left their four children behind in England, and stayed in America for less than two years. By the time of Penn's 1699 second visit to Pennsylvania, Gulielmas and six of their eight children had died. He arrived with his surviving daughter Letitia (1678–1745), and his second wife, Hannah Callowhill (1671–1726), who gave birth to their son John (1700–1746) in the colony. Penn again stayed for two years before returning to England, never to see Pennsylvania again.

During his first visit, Penn began construction of Pennsbury Manor, a country house along the Delaware River, more than 20 miles outside the city. He also had reserved a prime piece of Philadelphia real estate for himself – a full city block bounded by High (Market), Front, Chestnut, and Second Streets – close to the waterfront and beside the market. (Note: Penn donated the southern half of the block as the site for the Bank Friends Meeting House (built c.1685).) Prior to his 1701 departure, he deeded the northern half of this to his daughter Letitia, who returned with him to England, and married there in 1702. She sent instructions that the property be divided into lots and sold. Letitia Street, which cut through the Philadelphia block, was named for her.

=== 19th century ===
In his Annals of Philadelphia (1830), antiquarian John Fanning Watson argued that the two-and-a-half-story brick house at Letitia Street and Black Horse Alley had been William Penn's city residence during his 1682-84 visit. Identical claims had been made for two other buildings nearby, but Watson refuted these. The matter seemed all but settled by 1846, when Granville John Penn (1802–1867), William Penn's great-grandson, visited Philadelphia and was guest of honor at a reception held at the Letitia Street house.

Nearly 10 million people visited the 1876 Centennial Exposition, the first American World's Fair, mounted in West Fairmount Park. In his Centennial guidebook, Thompson Westcott went further than Watson, presenting (what he thought was) (Note: Gabriel Thomas was one of Pennsylvania's first English residents. He arrived at Philadelphia in 1681, a year prior to William Penn, and "resided there about Fifteen Years." He was the author of An Historical and Geographical Account of the Province and Country of Pensilvania and West-New-Jersey in America, published in London in 1696. Thomas wrote, "I saw the first Cellar when it was digging for the use of our Governour Will. Penn." Writing nearly 180 years later, Westcott concluded that Thomas had been describing the cellar of the Letitia Street House, and that its construction was begun prior to Penn's 1682 arrival. But Thomas did not name the building, its location (other than Pennsylvania), or when he saw it.) documentary evidence that the Letitia Street House was "the oldest house in Philadelphia," and had been "the first house which was built in the city." Westcott expanded on this case in his next book, arguing that the house's construction "must have been commenced before Penn's arrival [in 1682]." It was well documented that Penn had rented the Slate Roof House as his city residence during the 1699-1701 second visit — John Penn was born there. But despite that building's direct associations with the Penn family and Pennsylvania's colonial government, and despite desperate calls by antiquarians to preserve it, the Slate Roof House was demolished in 1867. Every other building associated with Penn, including his country house, also had been demolished. As the two-hundredth anniversary of Pennsylvania's 1682 founding approached, there was a desire to honor Penn with a monument. The Letitia Street House became that monument.

=== Relocation ===
The Bi-Centennial Association of Pennsylvania was formed to raise funds through subscription to relocate the house, and to organize a week-long anniversary celebration for October 1882. The parades, historical pageants, athletic events (including a regatta on the Schuylkill River), concerts and fireworks went on as scheduled. But relocation of the house did not begin until June 1883. Restoration was completed in October.

The house was again restored, 1931–32, overseen by Fiske Kimball, director of the Philadelphia Museum of Art. (Note: Kimball would have welcomed the opportunity to correct the historical record. Ten years earlier, in his Domestic Architecture of the American Colonies and of the Early Republic (1922), he had repeated Watson's and Westcott's conjectures that the Letitia Street House dated from 1682–1683.) New historical research debunked Watson's and Westcott's conjectures about when the house had been built — Kimball dated it "after 1703 and before 1715." (Note: Kimball debunked Watson and Westcott with documentary evidence. He cited the May 3/4, 1703 indenture of release for the lot – the real estate contract for its sale – which listed no buildings on the property. He based his cutoff year of 1715 on stylistic ground. He also cited a 1685 letter to Penn (who had returned to England), informing him of the completion of the first brick house in Philadelphia – Robert Turner to William Penn, 3 June 1685. Gabriel Thomas's reference to "the first Cellar ... for the use of our Governour," published in 1696, may have described Penn's country house, Pennsbury Manor (begun c.1683, completed c.1686).) PMA took on administration of the house, operating it as a small museum exhibiting Queen Anne style furniture and decorative arts objects. In 1940, the WPA guidebook to Pennsylvania concluded: "Although believed at one time to be the dwelling erected for William Penn in 1682, it was learned later that the town house of William Penn was a frame structure destroyed long ago." The house museum closed in 1965.

In the 1990s, the house served as headquarters for the Wildlife Preservation Trust International. In 2012, Philadelphia designated $600,000 in its capital budget for the building's restoration. After a period of vacancy, in 2017, the Centennial Parkside Community Development Corporation leased the house and renovated the interior with support from the William Penn Foundation. The house remains the office headquarters for the Centennial Parkside Community Development Corporation.

== Legacy ==
Interest in the Letitia Street House waned following the discovery that it held no personal connection to William Penn. Still, it remains a rare surviving example of an Early Georgian city house; and its 1883 relocation, an early case of intentional historic preservation.

It was added to the Philadelphia Register of Historic Places on June 26, 1956.

In 1991, a near-replica of the Letitia Street House was built at 90 6th Avenue in Collegeville, Pennsylvania.

== Gallery ==
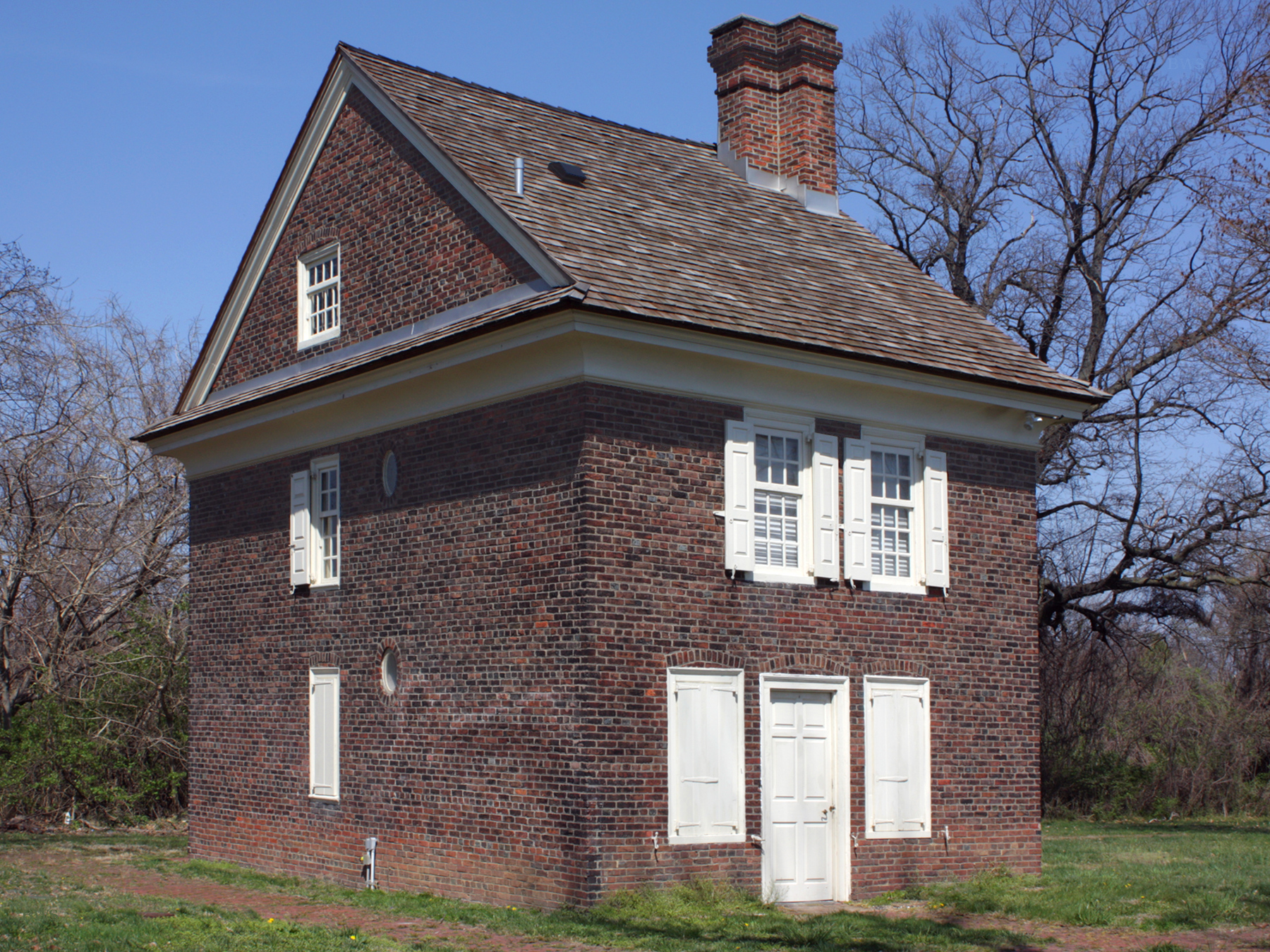
Exterior (rear)

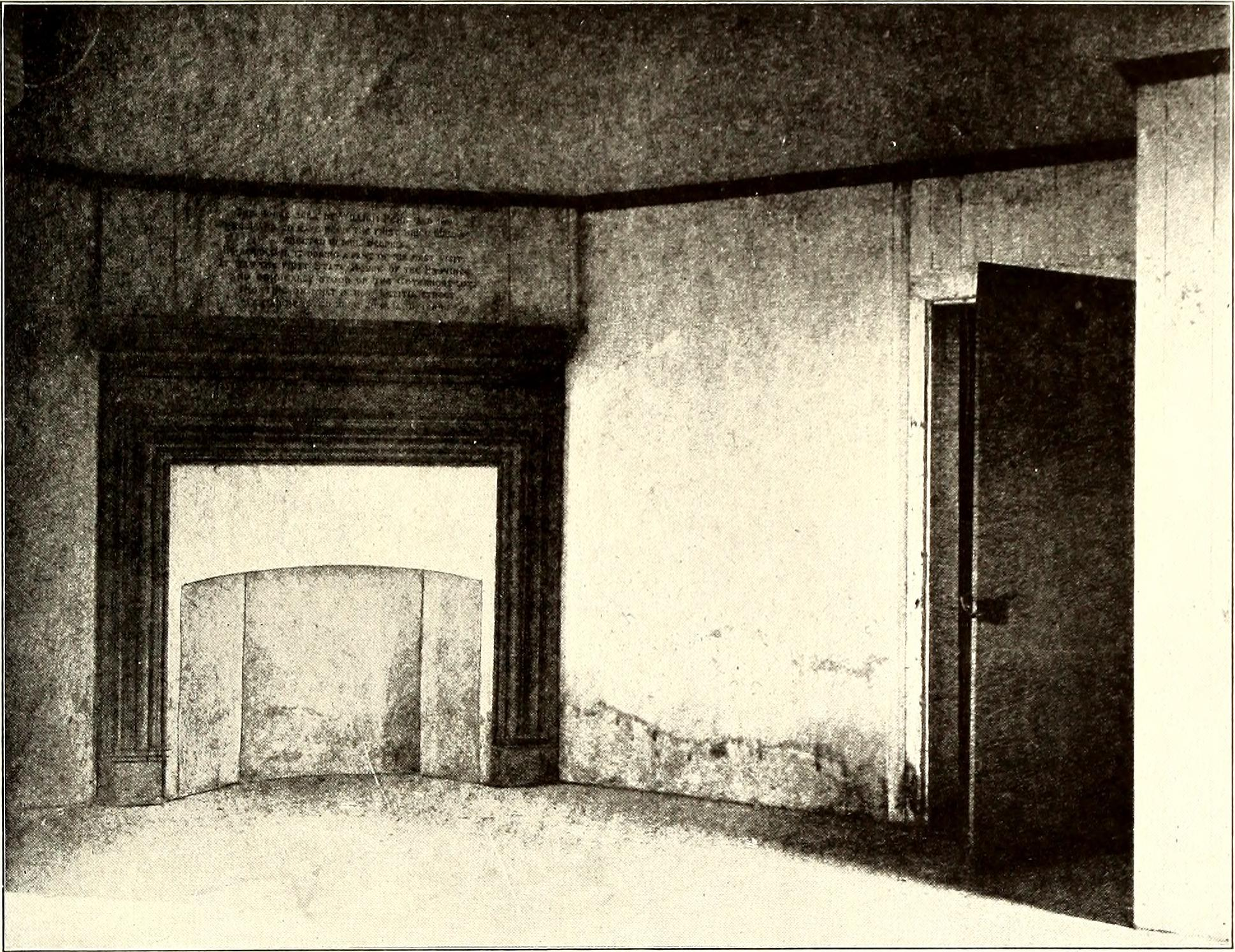
Interior, prior to 1883 relocation

== See also ==
- List of houses in Fairmount Park
- London Coffee House (Philadelphia)
