= Ridgeland Mansion =

Historic house in Pennsylvania, United States

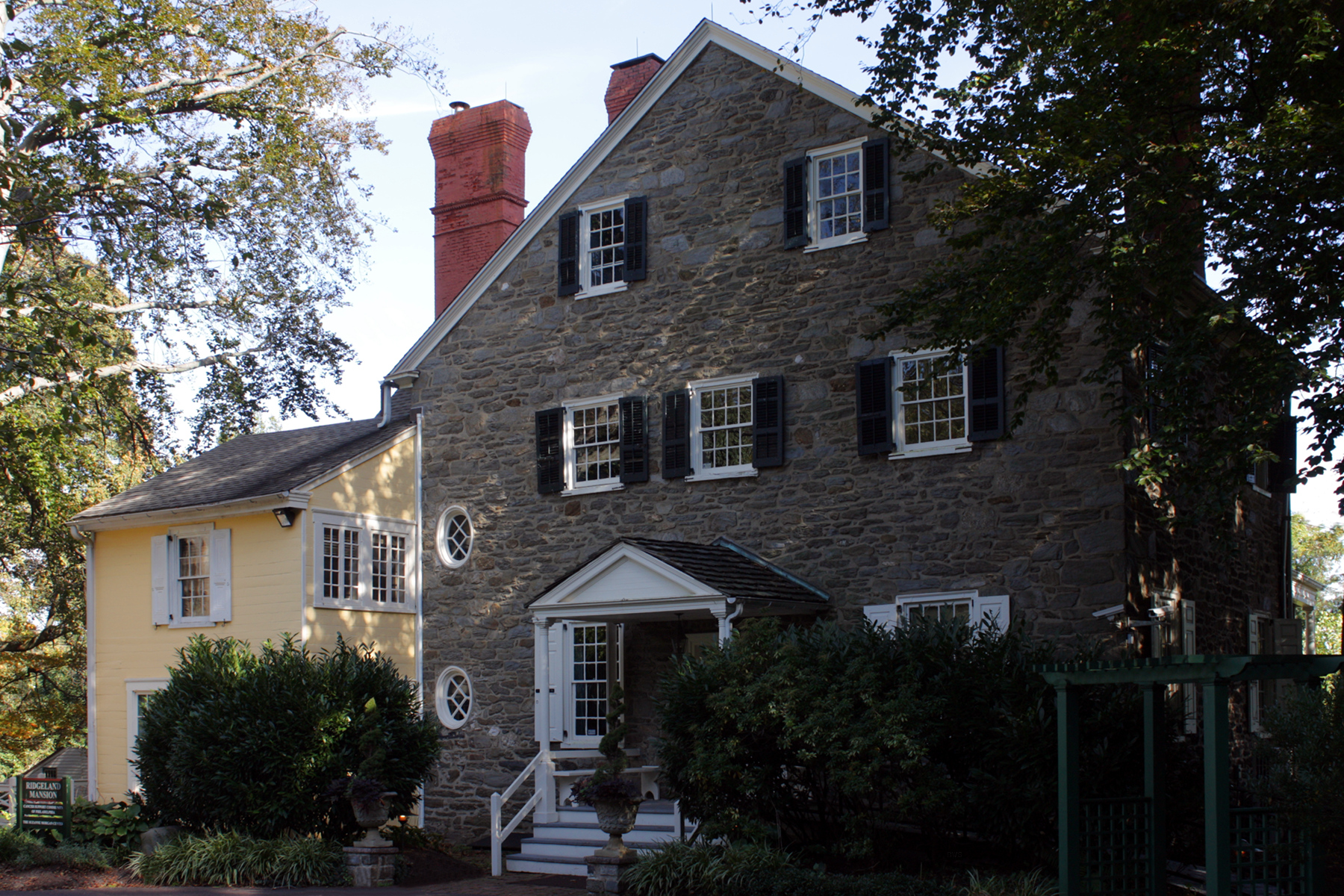

- Location within Philadelphia Location within Pennsylvania Location within the United States
- 39°59′33″N 75°12′37″W
- Location: 4100 Chamounix Drive, Philadelphia

History
- Built: 1752–62

Site notes
- Architectural style: Federal
- Governing body: Philadelphia Parks & Recreation
- Owner: City of Philadelphia

Philadelphia Register of Historic Places
- Official name: Ridgeland (Mount Prospect)
- Designated: June 26, 1956

U.S. National Register of Historic Places
- Designated: February 7, 1972
- Reference no.: 72001151

Ridgeland Mansion is an historic 2 1/2-story, gable-roofed house located in west Fairmount Park, Philadelphia. The land was purchased by a yeoman named William Couch in 1718 and the current house was probably constructed sometime between 1752 and 1762.

== History and architectural features ==
Originally created as a farm house, it was expanded to mansion proportions through various alterations and additions made by later owners, as well as by the city which had acquired the property in 1869 for the expansion of Fairmount Park. George Clymer, a Founding Father of the United States, owned the house between 1784 and 1794, though he apparently only rented it out and never lived there.

A notable feature of the house is the use of round windows, including two small oval windows, one on each of the first and second stories of the northwestern facade, and a divided semicircular window in the southeastern gable. Though the main part of the house is composed of Wissahickon schist, several wood-frame extensions with stone foundations adjoin the northeastern end of the house. These extensions include a two-story gable-roofed addition with clapboard siding and a large chimney on the northern corner, and another two-story clapboard addition to the east with a gable roof including a dentilled cornice and a semi-octagonal wall. Finally, a one-story clapboard kitchen wing was attached to the northeastern wall. Two barns and an ice house also stand on the property.

Since 1997, the house has been leased and operated by the Cancer Support Community Greater Philadelphia (CSCGP) through the Fairmount Park Conservancy's Historic Preservation Trust. Events are held at the house and on the grounds of what has been named the CSCGP at The Suzanne Morgan Center at Ridgeland. The city's leasing agreements for Fairmount Park properties require lessees to commit financial resources to help with restoration and ongoing maintenance work. The lessees are not permitted to alter the historic architectural features of the structures, and must allow for public access.

Ridgeland Mansion is registered on the Philadelphia Register of Historic Places and is an inventoried structure within the Fairmount Park Historic District entry on the National Register of Historic Places.

== See also ==
- List of houses in Fairmount Park
- National Register of Historic Places listings in West Philadelphia – an inventoried structure within the Fairmount Park listing
