= Smith Memorial Playground & Playhouse =

Smith Memorial Playhouse
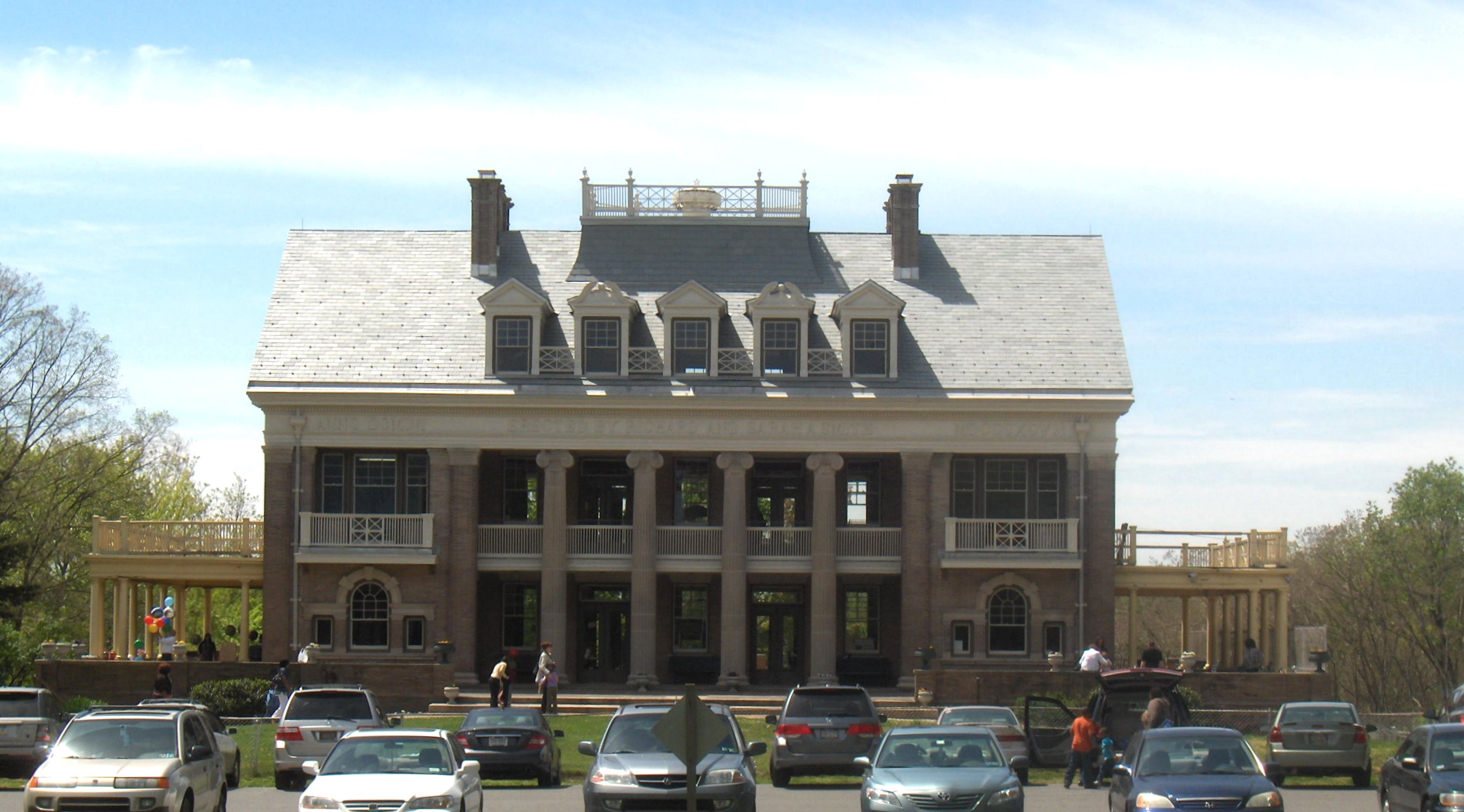
- Smith Playhouse

- Location within Pennsylvania Location within the United States
- 39°58′54″N 75°11′44″W
- Location: Philadelphia, Pennsylvania

Philadelphia Register of Historic Places

Smith Memorial Playground & Playhouse is a free young children's playground near North 33rd Street and Oxford Street in Philadelphia, Pennsylvania, within the borders of Fairmount Park, Philadelphia, Pennsylvania. Philadelphia magazine awarded it Best Playground of Philly in 2006 and 2008, calling it "a city treasure." The playground was highlighted during a May 2024 episode of the Abbott Elementary television show.

== Renovations ==
Established in 1899 by the wills of Richard and Sarah Smith and designed by architect James H. Windrim, it occupies nearly 6 1/2 acres, and is visited by more than 1000 children per day. From 2003 to 2005, the playground was closed while a citizen's non-profit group began a rejuvenation of its play equipment and landscape, as well as a renovation of its 24,000 sq ft (2,200 m^{2}) Playhouse for very young children. The Playhouse underwent an extensive renovation in 2021 to offer additional unique indoor play spaces.

=== Playhouse ===
The playhouse is for children 5 and under, with any baby who can play welcome, but accompanied by at least one adult 18 or older.

=== Playground ===
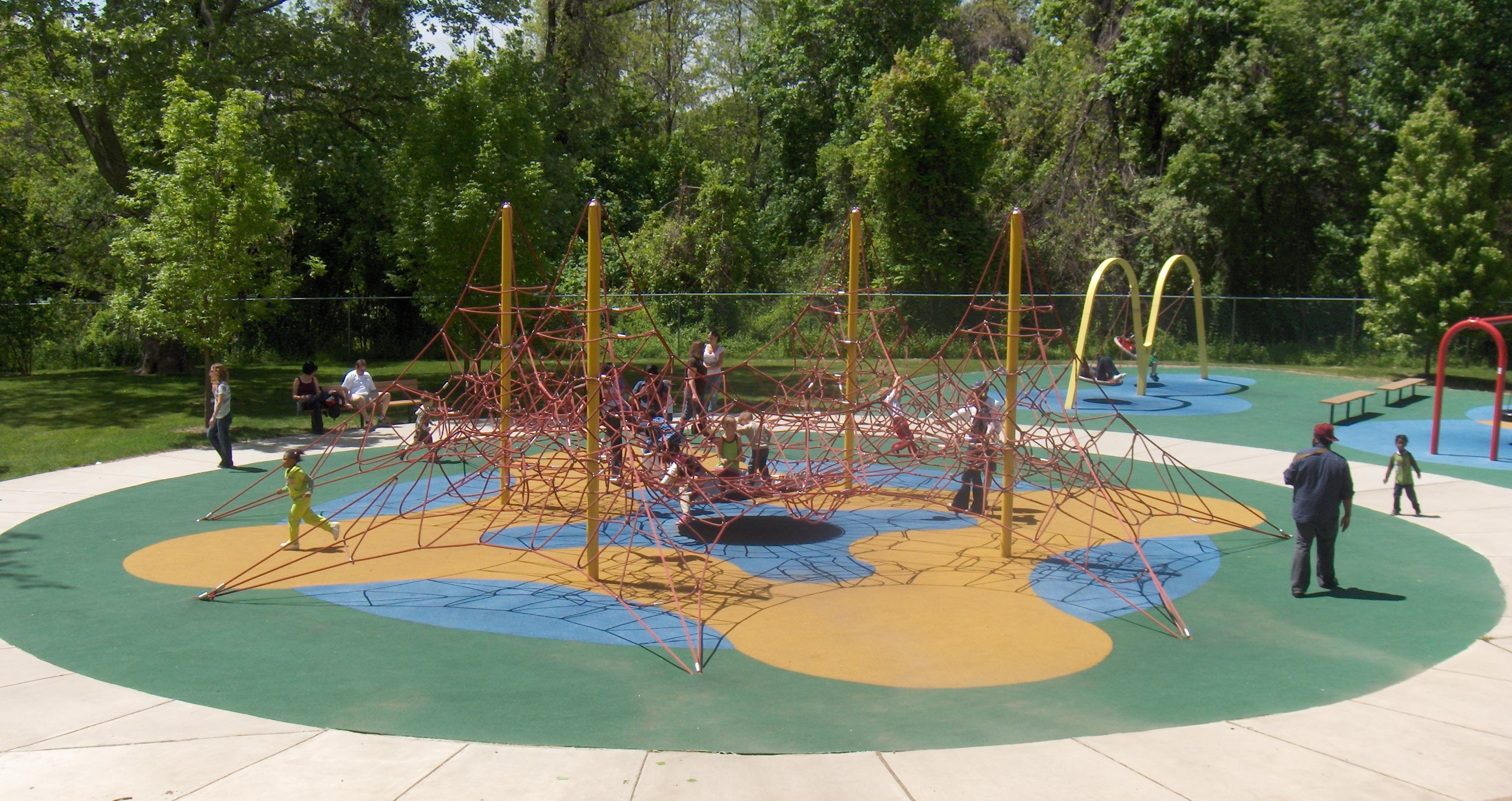
Smith Playground

In July 2005, the Ann Newman Giant Wooden Slide was reopened, and in August 2006 a new complex of swings called "Swing City" was opened. By 2009, an area about three football fields in size had been redone, and the outside of the Playhouse preserved. On July 31, 2019, a statue inspired by Ora Washington, titled "MVP", was added to the playground. The Giant Slide is 40 feet (12 m) long, 12 feet (3.7 m) wide, 10 feet (3.0 m) high, and 12 children can use it at once. The playground is for children 10 and under, accompanied by at least one adult 18 or older. There is a special play area for very young children.

== See also ==
- List of houses in Fairmount Park
