= The Touraine =

- U.S. National Register of Historic Places
- Philadelphia Register of Historic Places
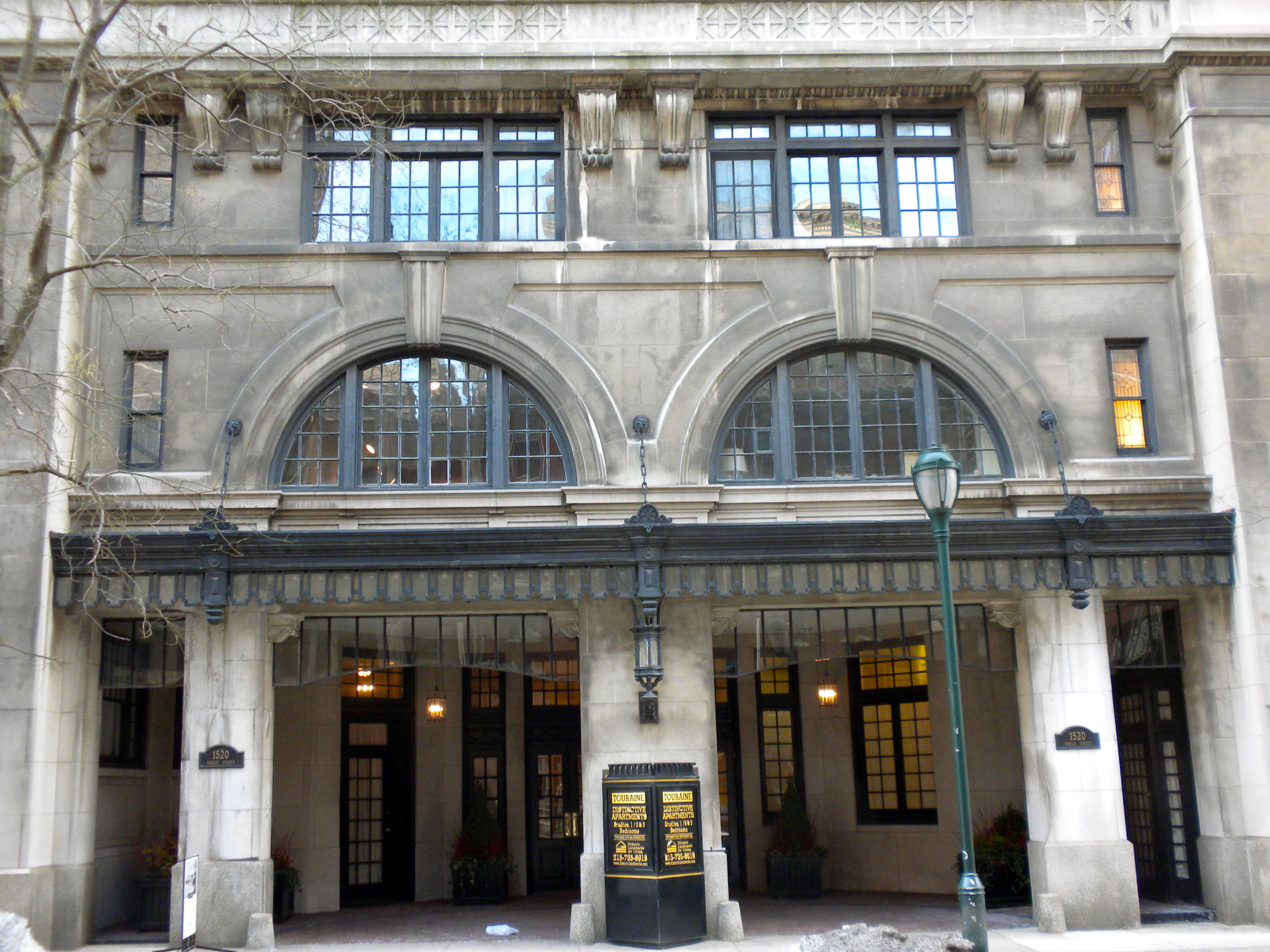

- Location within Philadelphia Location within Pennsylvania Location within the United States
- Location: 1520 Spruce Street, Philadelphia, Pennsylvania
- Coordinates: 39°56′49″N 75°10′5″W
- Area: 1 acre (0.40 ha)
- Built: 1917
- Architect: Frederick Webber
- NRHP reference No.: 82003816

Significant dates
- Added to NRHP: April 07, 1982
- Designated PRHP: January 7, 1982

The Touraine is a historic building in Philadelphia, Pennsylvania. The 13-story building was originally constructed in 1917 as a grand hotel. In 1983, it was converted into luxury apartments.

The building was listed on the National Register of Historic Places in 1982. It was added to the Philadelphia Register of Historic Places on January 7, 1982.
