= Ohio House (Philadelphia) =

Historic house in Pennsylvania, United States

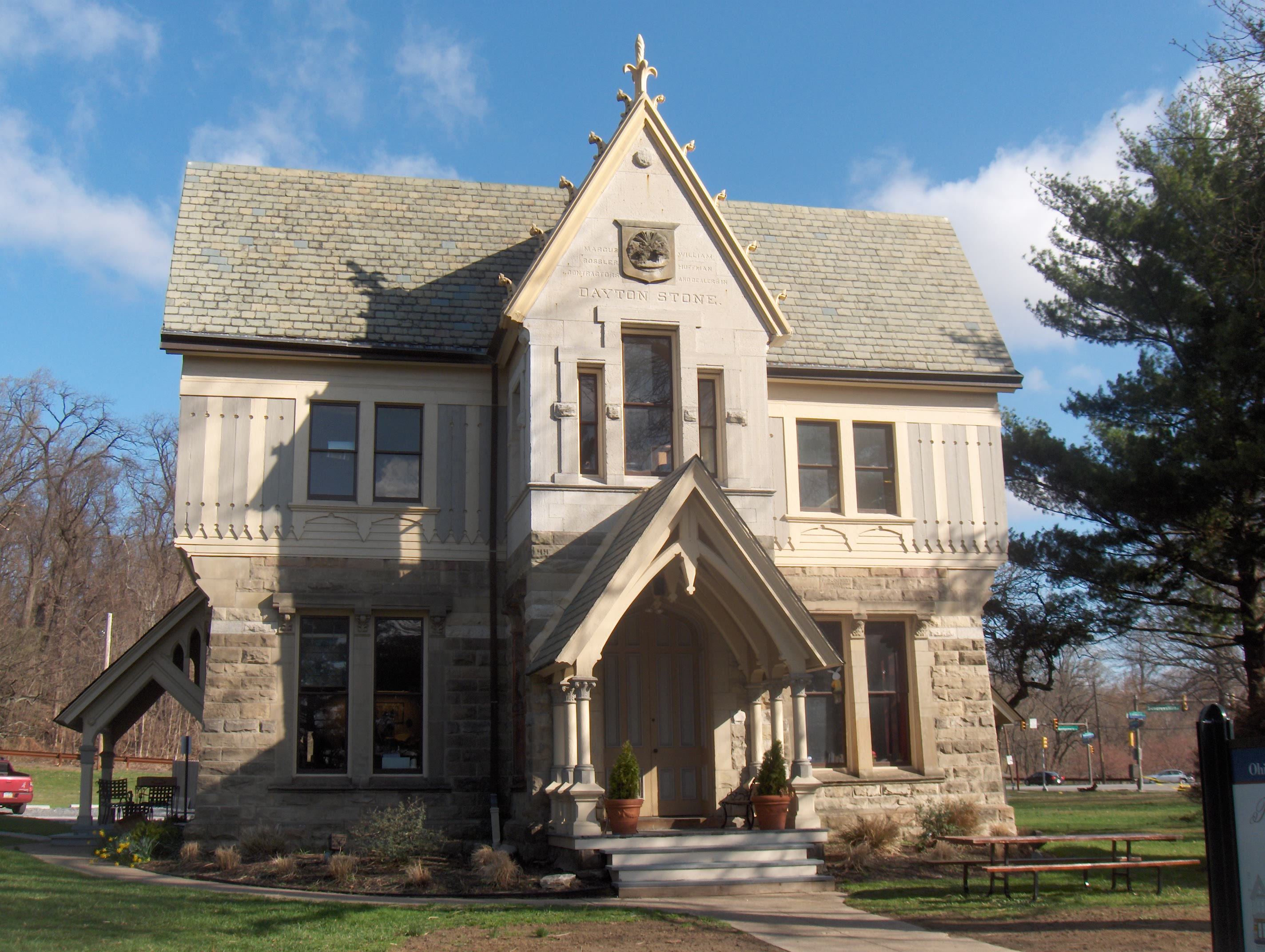

- Location within Philadelphia Location within Pennsylvania Location within the United States
- 39°59′06″N 75°12′58″W
- Location: 1700 Belmont Ave, Philadelphia

History
- Built: 1876

Site notes
- Architectural style: Gothic Revival
- Governing body: Philadelphia Parks & Recreation
- Owner: City of Philadelphia

Philadelphia Register of Historic Places
- Official name: Ohio State Building
- Designated: unspecified

U.S. National Register of Historic Places
- Official name: Ohio House
- Designated: February 7, 1972
- Reference no.: 72001151

The Ohio House, or the Ohio State Building, is an historic building in west Fairmount Park, Philadelphia, Pennsylvania, United States.

It is listed on the Philadelphia Register of Historic Places and is an inventoried structure within the Fairmount Park Historic District entry on the National Register of Historic Places.

== History and architectural features ==
The house was built using various Ohio sandstones and functioned as the Ohio state exhibit for the Centennial Exposition of 1876. The only other extant exposition structures are Memorial Hall and two small comfort stations; the building is the only extant state exhibit remaining from the exposition.

The house was restored for the Bicentennial Celebration in 1976 and leased to Ohio House Partners by the Fairmount Park Historic Preservation Trust in 2006. After extensive restoration, the building was opened to the public in November 2007 and has since functioned as a cafe, event venue and offices.

The Ohio House is listed on the Philadelphia Register of Historic Places and is an inventoried structure within the Fairmount Park Historic District entry on the National Register of Historic Places.

== See also ==
- List of houses in Fairmount Park
- National Register of Historic Places listings in West Philadelphia — an inventoried structure within the Fairmount Park listing
