= Sun Oil Building =

- U.S. National Register of Historic Places
- Philadelphia Register of Historic Places
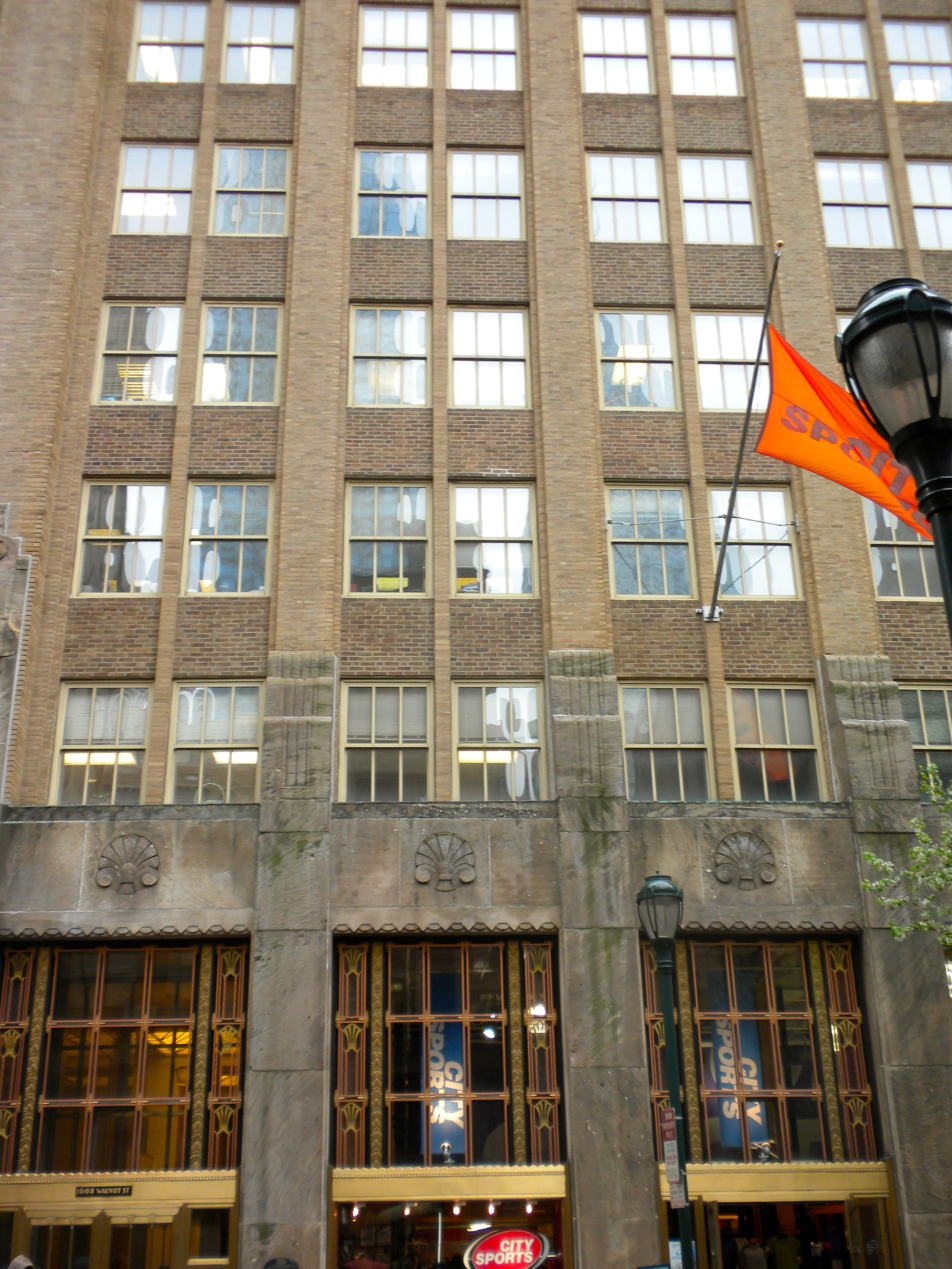
- Sun Oil Building in Center City Philadelphia in April 2010

- Location within Philadelphia Location within Pennsylvania Location within the United States
- Location: 1608-1610 Walnut St., Philadelphia, Pennsylvania
- Coordinates: 39°56′58″N 75°10′7″W
- Area: 0.3 acres (0.12 ha)
- Built: 1928
- Architects: Tilden, Register & Pepper
- Architectural style: Art Deco
- NRHP reference No.: 83002280

Significant dates
- Added to NRHP: August 25, 1983
- Designated PRHP: February 2, 1984

The Sun Oil Building is a historic building in the Center City area of Philadelphia, Pennsylvania. The 19-story Art Deco high-rise stands 230 feet (70 m) tall. It served as the headquarters of the Sun Oil Company from its erection in 1928 until Sun relocated in 1971.

It was listed on the National Register of Historic Places in 1983, and on the Philadelphia Register of Historic Places on February 2, 1984.
