= Rockland Mansion =

Historic house in Pennsylvania, United States

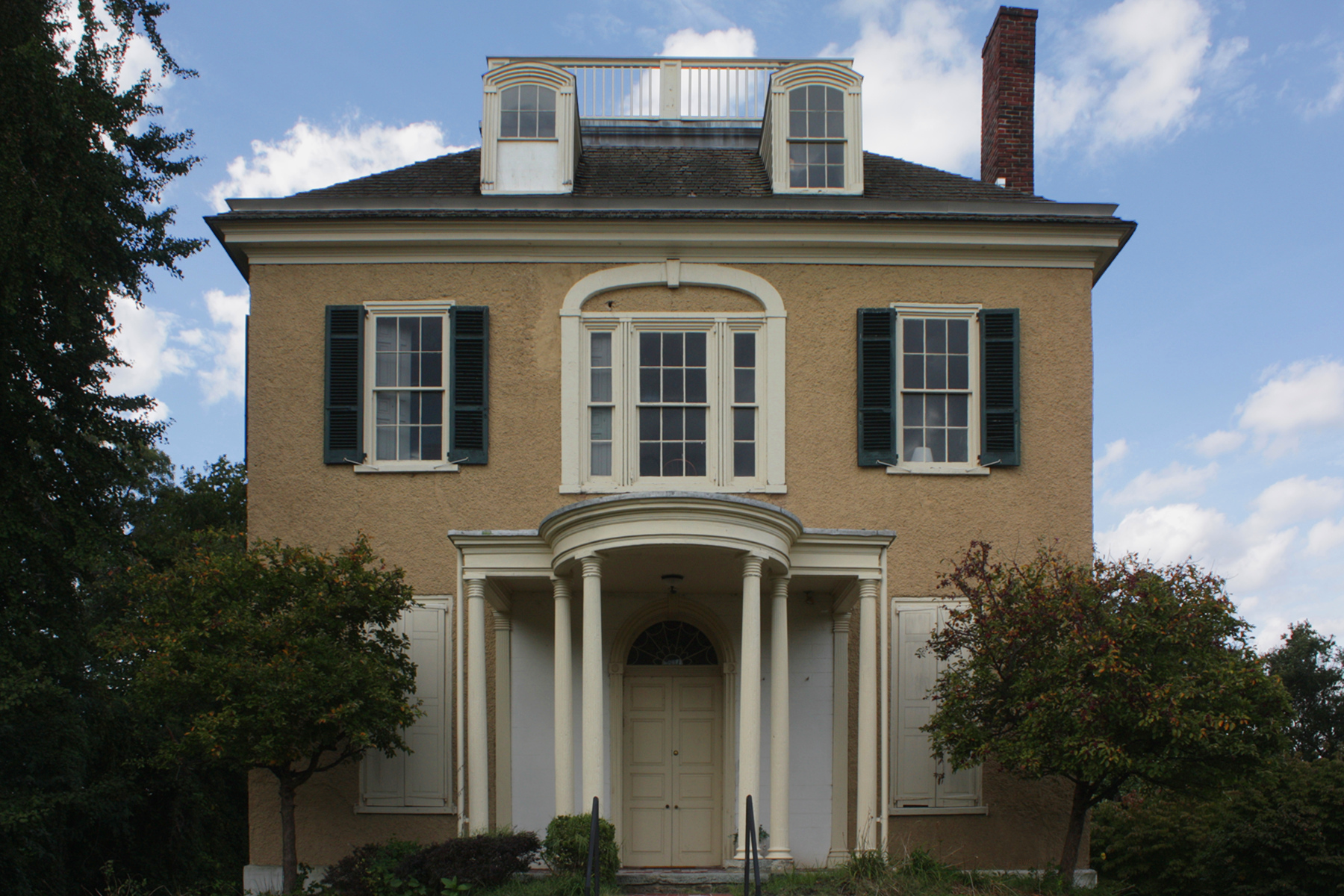

- Location within Philadelphia Location within Pennsylvania Location within the United States
- 39°59′09″N 75°11′59″W
- Location: 3810 Mount Pleasant Drive, Philadelphia

History
- Built: c. 1810

Site notes
- Architectural style: Federal
- Governing body: Philadelphia Parks & Recreation
- Owner: City of Philadelphia

Philadelphia Register of Historic Places
- Official name: Rockland
- Designated: May 31, 1960

U.S. National Register of Historic Places
- Designated: February 7, 1972
- Reference no.: 72001151

The Rockland Mansion is a 2 1/2-story, Federal-style mansion that is located in east Fairmount Park, Philadelphia, overlooking the Schuylkill River.

== History and architectural features ==
The land was bought by a Philadelphia merchant named George Thomson in 1809. The mansion was completed circa 1810 using rubble stone for the masonry work which was then finished with stucco scored to resemble cut stone. Thomson used the house as a summer residence for about five years and then sold it to another merchant named Isaac Jones in 1815 whose son sold it to the city in 1870. The house and original plot of 26 acres (11 ha) of land are situated adjacent to the Mount Pleasant Mansion along Mount Pleasant Drive.

Beginning in 2002, the Psychoanalytic Center of Philadelphia (PCoP) entered into a long-term lease arrangement with the city, via the Fairmount Park Conservancy's Historic Preservation Trust. Between 2002 and 2005, PCoP restored the house with help from the trust. PCoP relocated its administrative offices to the mansion, and schedules educational and community-related activities there.

The city's leasing agreements for Fairmount Park properties require lessees to commit financial resources to help with restoration and ongoing maintenance work. The lessees are not permitted to alter the historic architectural features of the structures, and must allow for public access.

Rockland Mansion is registered on the Philadelphia Register of Historic Places and is an inventoried structure within the Fairmount Park Historic District entry on the National Register of Historic Places.

== See also ==
- List of houses in Fairmount Park
- National Register of Historic Places listings in North Philadelphia – an inventoried structure within the Fairmount Park listing
