= Cedar Grove Mansion =

Historic house in Pennsylvania, United States

- U.S. National Register of Historic Places
- Philadelphia Register of Historic Places
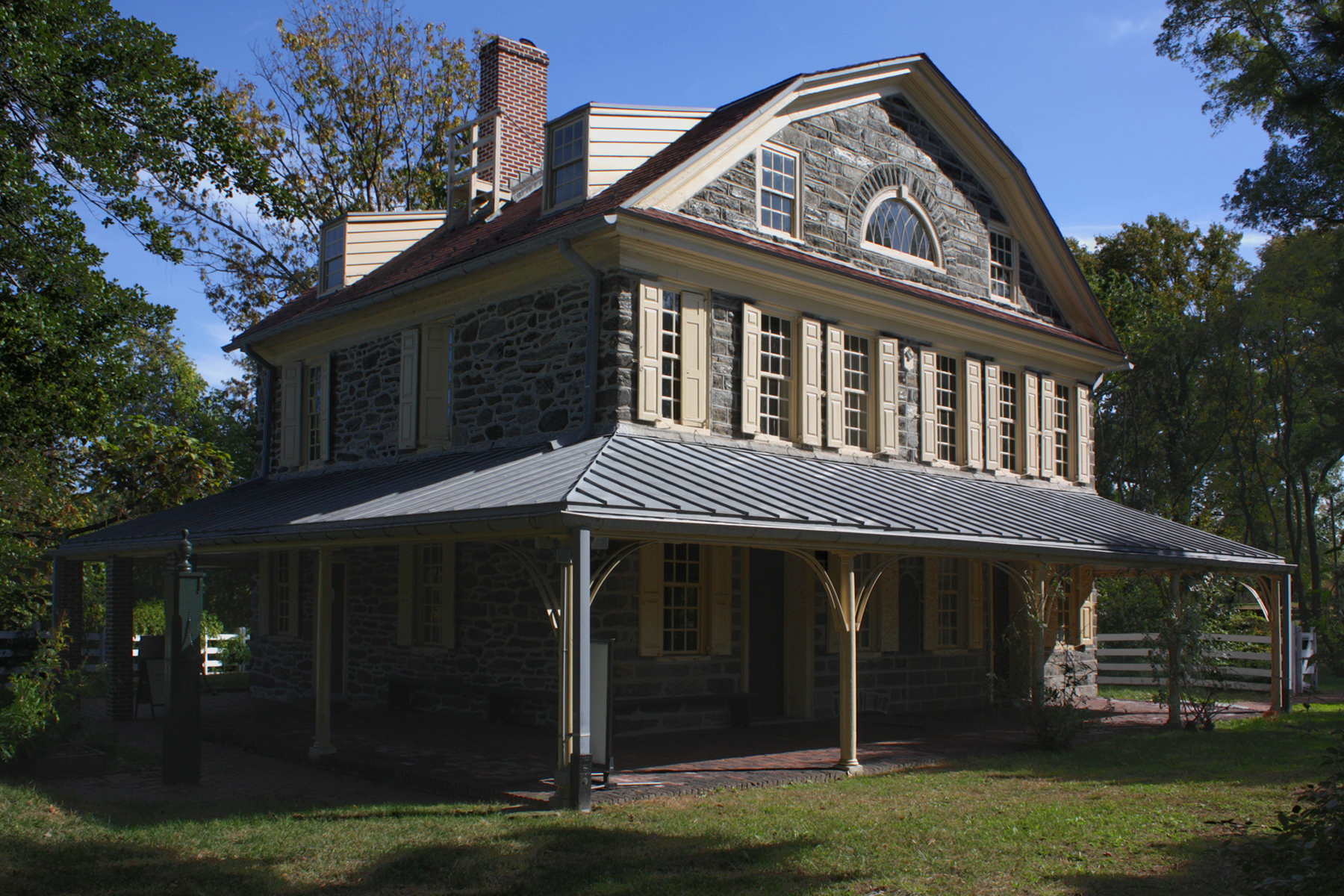

- Location within Philadelphia Location within Pennsylvania Location within the United States
- Location: 1 Cedar Grove Drive, Philadelphia, Pennsylvania, 19131, U.S.
- Coordinates: 39°58′45″N 75°12′16″W
- Architectural style: Federal
- Part of: Fairmount Park Historic District
- NRHP reference No.: 72001151

Significant dates
- Designated NRHP: February 7, 1972
- Designated PRHP: June 26, 1956

Cedar Grove Mansion, located in west Fairmount Park, was the summer residence for five generations of Philadelphia families. The house was built as a rural retreat from city life, and was originally located within the present day Frankford neighborhood of Northeast Philadelphia, about 4 mi (6.4 km) beyond the colonial-era city limits. In 1746, Elizabeth Coates Paschall purchased the property on which the house was subsequently built. Paschall was a widow with three children who had inherited her husband's dry goods business and desired a rural retreat from the city near her father's farm in Frankford. Construction of the grey stone house on a plot of 15 acres (6.1 ha) along Frankford Road began in 1748 and continued to 1750.

Additions were made by Paschall and succeeding generations. A granddaughter named Sarah inherited the house, married Isaac Wistar Morris in 1795, and doubled the size of Cedar Grove with more rooms and a third floor. A wraparound porch was added later. Various architectural styles such as Baroque, Rococo, and Federal are evident in the interior rooms.

Lydia Thompson Morris, the last of the family to own Cedar Grove, gave the house and original furniture to the city of Philadelphia in 1926. The house was then moved from the Frankford neighborhood to Fairmount Park in 1926–28. The Philadelphia Museum of Art administers the house and has kept it fully furnished with period furniture passed down by generations of the Morris family. Guided tours of the house are available through the Art Museum.

Cedar Grove is registered on the Philadelphia Register of Historic Places and is an inventoried structure within the Fairmount Park Historic District entry on the National Register of Historic Places.

== See also ==
- List of houses in Fairmount Park
- National Register of Historic Places listings in West Philadelphia – an inventoried structure within the Fairmount Park listing
