= Ormiston Mansion (Philadelphia) =

Historic house in Pennsylvania, United States

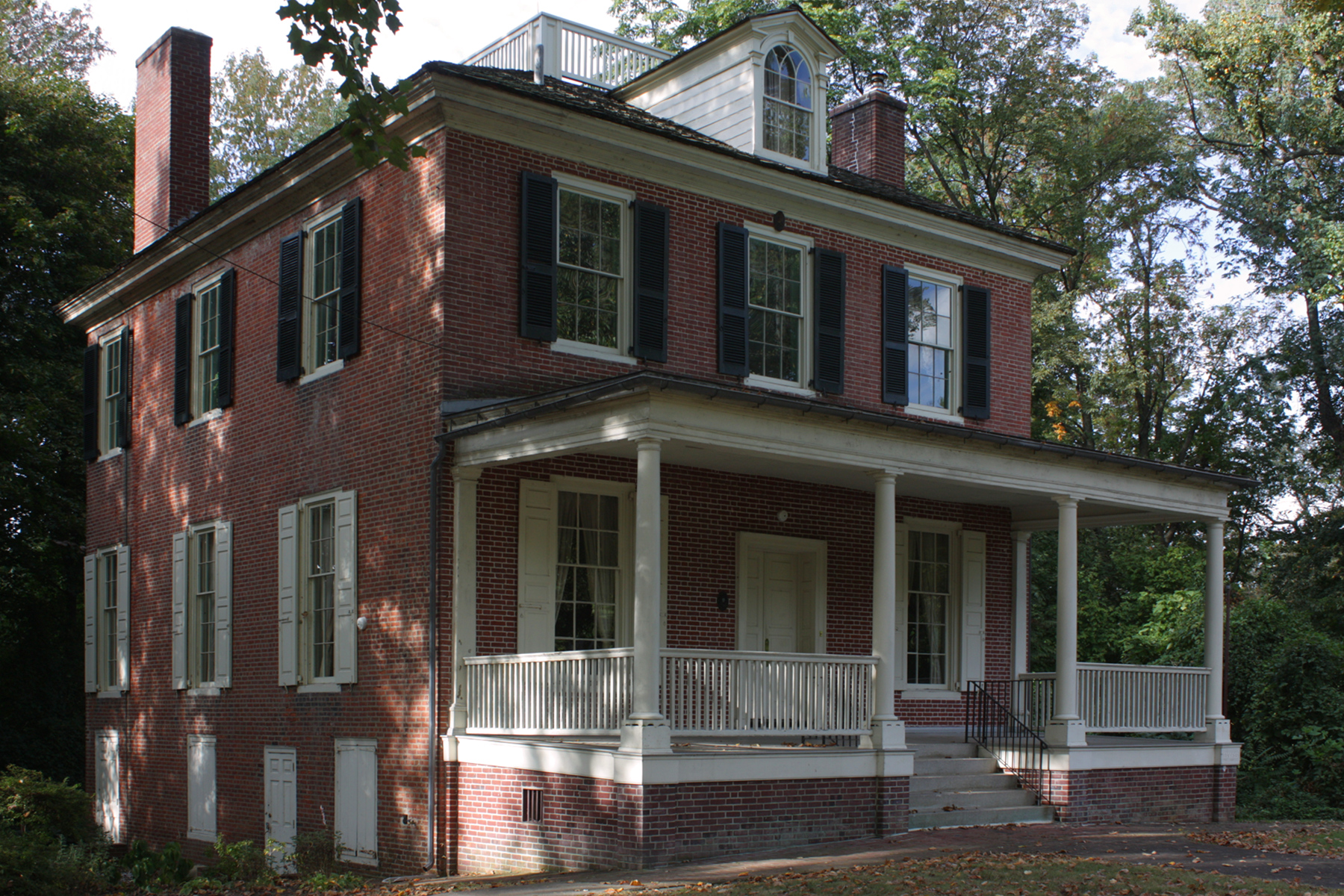

- Location within Philadelphia Location within Pennsylvania Location within the United States
- 39°59′19″N 75°11′47″W
- Location: 2000 Reservoir Drive, Philadelphia

History
- Built: 1798

Site notes
- Architect: Edward Burd (owner)
- Architectural style: Georgian
- Governing body: Philadelphia Parks & Recreation
- Owner: Edward Burd (original), City of Philadelphia (current)

Philadelphia Register of Historic Places
- Official name: Ormiston
- Designated: June 26, 1956

U.S. National Register of Historic Places
- Designated: February 7, 1972
- Reference no.: 72001151

Ormiston Mansion is a 2 1/2-story, red brick, late Georgian period house located in east Fairmount Park, Philadelphia. The house was constructed in 1798 with a large wooden porch in front and a smaller porch in the rear. Many of the original interior features remain including fireplaces with marble mantles and a Scottish bake oven. The cedar shake roof includes a widow's walk and Federal-style dormers, while six large shuttered windows are on each side of the house, and five on the front. The first floor interior includes a large drawing room spanning the entire width of the house, a kitchen, and a dining room with a large door leading to the rear porch. The back of the house overlooks the Schuylkill River.

Edward Burd, a Pennsylvania Supreme Court prothonotary, built the mansion on a plot of 45 acres (18 ha) above the eastern bank of the Schuylkill River. Burd named the house after the village near Edinburgh where his father, James Burd, was born.

The city of Philadelphia purchased the mansion and land from Burd's heirs in 1869 to expand Fairmount Park. The house was used as a residence for park employees, and later as the Fairmount Park Art Association's meeting house. The Royal Heritage Society of the Delaware Valley—a privately funded non-profit organization dedicated to preserving Pennsylvania's British heritage—has preserved and maintained the house for the city since 1982. The organization hosts various events at the house to which both society members and the general public are invited.

Ormiston Mansion is registered on the Philadelphia Register of Historic Places and is an inventoried structure within the Fairmount Park Historic District entry on the National Register of Historic Places.

== See also ==
- List of houses in Fairmount Park
- National Register of Historic Places listings in North Philadelphia - an inventoried structure within the Fairmount Park listing
