= Wissahickon (house) =

- U.S. National Register of Historic Places
- Philadelphia Register of Historic Places
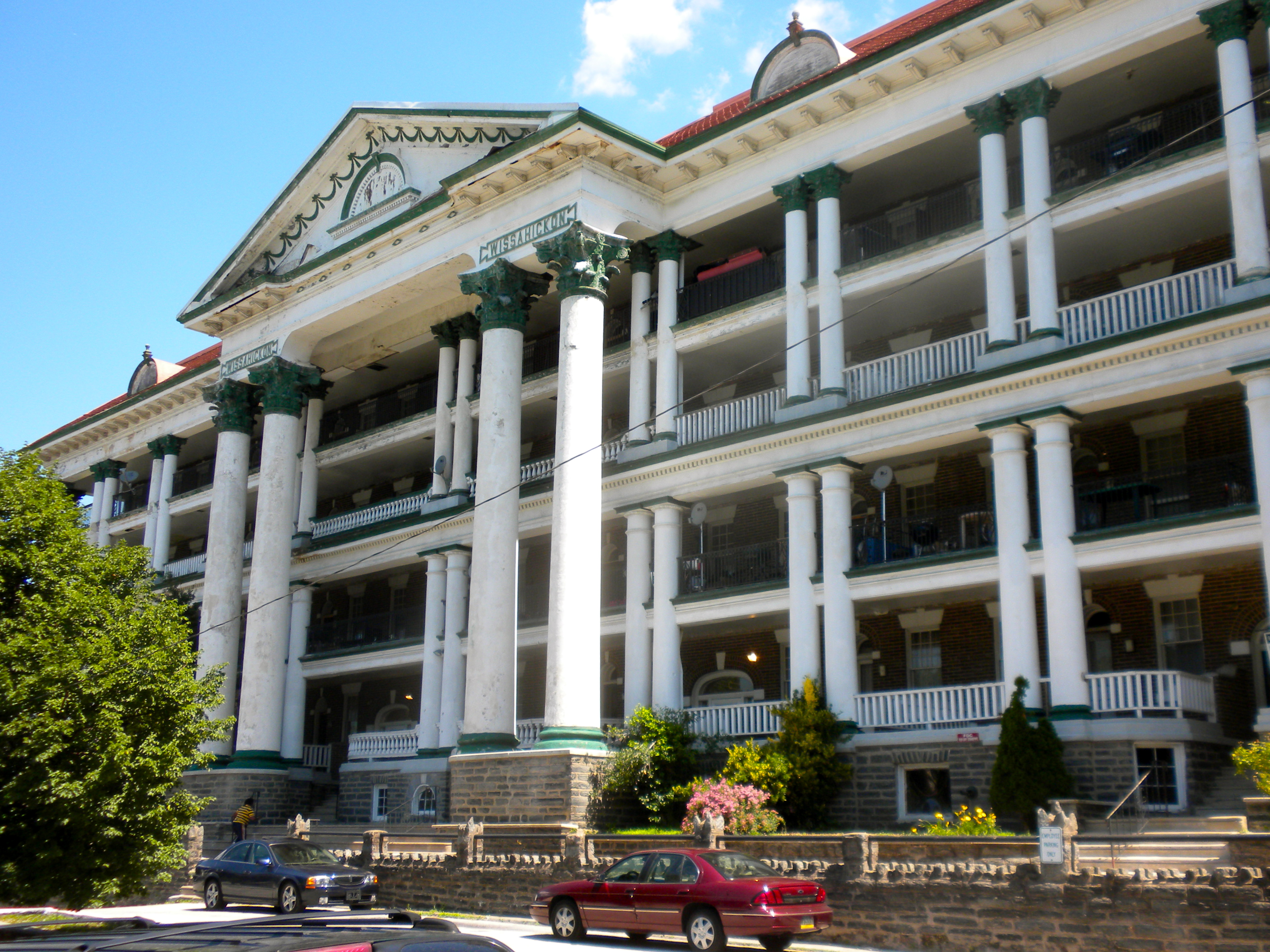

- Location within Philadelphia Location within Pennsylvania Location within the United States
- Location: 5215-31 Schuyler St, Philadelphia, Pennsylvania
- Coordinates: 40°1′23″N 75°10′40″W
- Area: 0.7 acres (0.28 ha)
- Built: 1911
- Architect: W. Frisbey Smith
- Architectural style: Georgian
- NRHP reference No.: 83004257

Significant dates
- Added to NRHP: November 25, 1983
- Designated PRHP: August 6, 1981

Wissahickon is a historic apartment building in the Germantown, Philadelphia.

Wissahickon, which takes its name from nearby Wissahickon Creek, was listed on the National Register of Historic Places in 1983. It was listed on the Philadelphia Register of Historic Places on August 6, 1981.
