= Chamounix (Philadelphia, Pennsylvania) =

Historic house in Pennsylvania, United States

- U.S. National Register of Historic Places
- Philadelphia Register of Historic Places
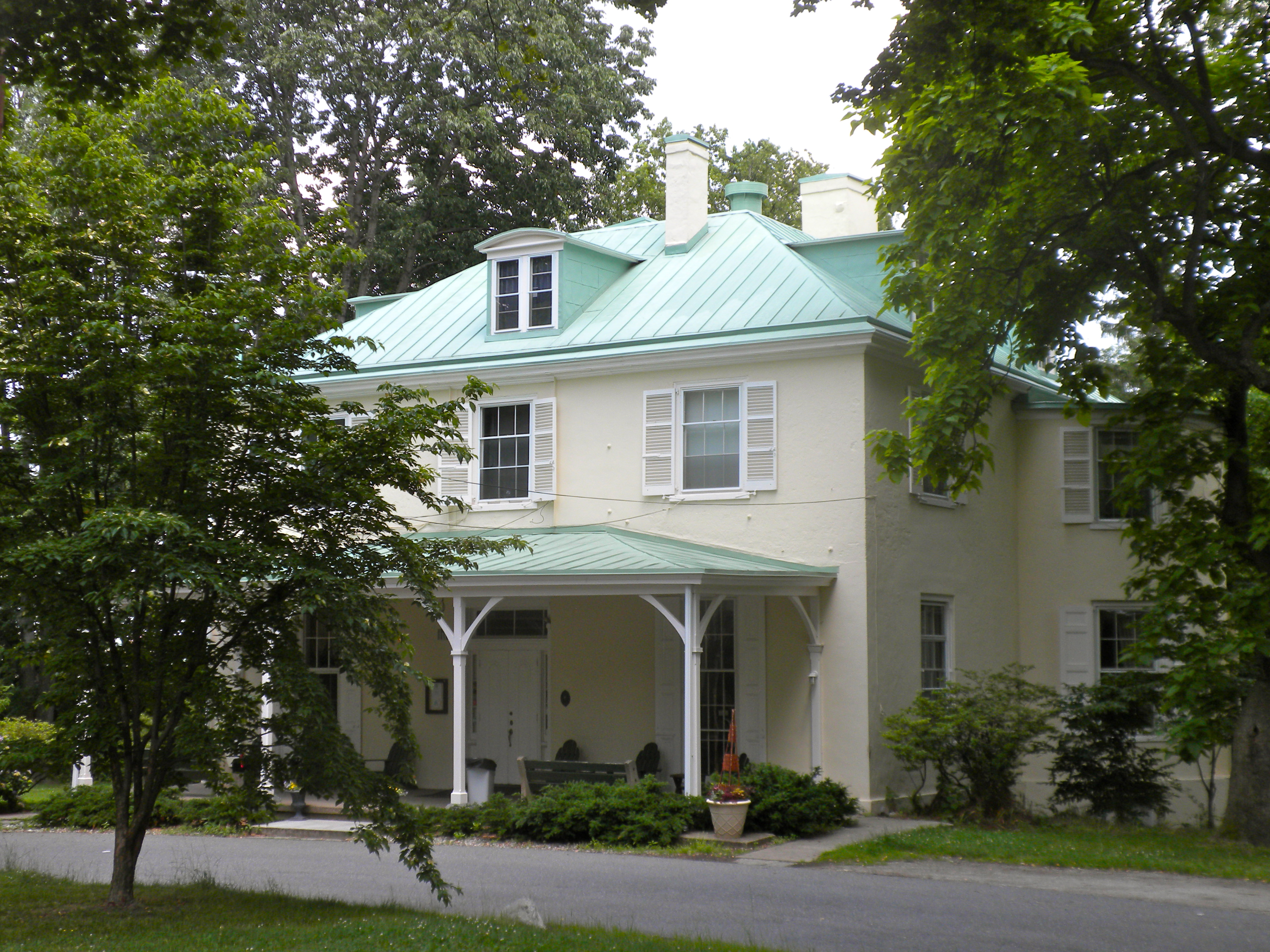
- Chamounix, June 2010

- Location within Philadelphia Location within Pennsylvania Location within the United States
- Location: West Fairmount Park on Chamounix Drive, Philadelphia, Pennsylvania
- Coordinates: 40°0′13.6″N 75°11′46.6″W
- Area: Less than one acre
- Built: 1802; 224 years ago
- Architectural style: Federal
- NRHP reference No.: 72001146
- Added to NRHP: April 26, 1972

Chamounix is a historic home located in Fairmount Park, Philadelphia, Pennsylvania. The Federal-style house was built in 1802 by George Plumsted who was a wealthy Philadelphia merchant, then enlarged to nearly double its original size by subsequent owners after 1853. Chamounix is a 2½-story stuccoed stone dwelling measuring 45 feet (14 m) long and 47 feet (14 m) deep, featuring a hipped roof with dormers and a porch on three sides with decorative iron supports. The house served as a country retreat until it was appropriated by the state via eminent domain in 1869 to become a part of Fairmount Park, from which time it was used in various ways including as a boarding house, a restaurant, and a refreshment stand. After years of neglect and then fire damage, the Fairmount Park Commission decided to demolish Chamounix; however, a committee of the former American Youth Hostels (AYH, now HI USA) successfully petitioned to save it and, since 1964, it has served as an international youth hostel.

Chamounix was added to the National Register of Historic Places in 1972.

== See also ==
- List of houses in Fairmount Park
