= The Lilacs (Philadelphia) =

Historic house in Pennsylvania, United States

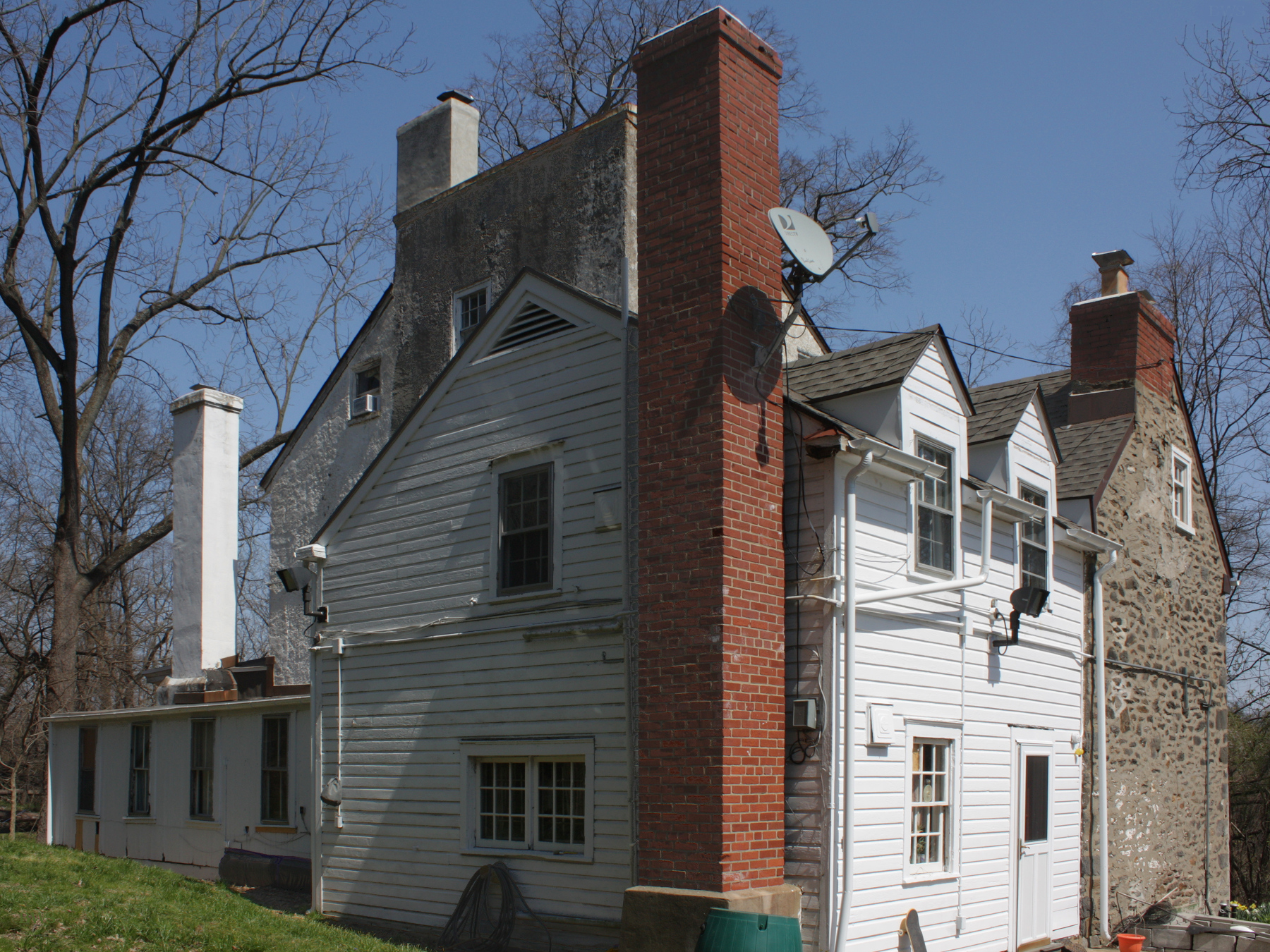
- Southwest corner of c.1711 house with the attached 1832 section to the northeast

- Location within Philadelphia Location within Pennsylvania Location within the United States
- 39°59′55″N 75°11′47″W
- Location: 3600 Greenland Dr, Philadelphia

History
- Built: c.1711, 1832

Site notes
- Governing body: Philadelphia Parks & Recreation
- Owner: Morten Garret (original), City of Philadelphia (current)

Philadelphia Register of Historic Places
- Official name: The Lilacs
- Designated: June 26, 1956

U.S. National Register of Historic Places
- Designated: February 7, 1972
- Reference no.: 72001151

The Lilacs is an early 18th-century farmhouse located in northwestern Fairmount Park, Philadelphia. The house has a large addition constructed in the early 19th century, with its name derived from the many lilac bushes on the property.

The original owner was Morten Garret who bought a 151-acre (61 ha) plot of land in 1711. The farmhouse was built in two sections with the southern section constructed by Garret sometime shortly after the land was purchased. The attached section was added by Garret's descendants in 1832, as an extension from the northeast wall of the original house.

The house was owned by the Garret family until the city purchased it in 1869 to expand Fairmount Park. A rowing club called the University Barge Club began using the house sometime after 1871 as its upstream social clubhouse along the Schuylkill River. In the 1990s, the house was used as a halfway house for juveniles.

As of 2018, a sign at the driveway entrance to the house stated Outward Bound—Lilac House—3600 Greenland Drive. The same organization leases and maintains the Porter's House of the demolished Sedgeley Mansion, also in Fairmount Park on the opposite side of the river.

The Lilacs house is registered on the Philadelphia Register of Historic Places and is an inventoried structure within the Fairmount Park Historic District entry on the National Register of Historic Places.

== See also ==
- List of houses in Fairmount Park
- National Register of Historic Places listings in West Philadelphia – an inventoried structure within the Fairmount Park listing
- Outward Bound USA
