= Fairmount Park =

Park in Philadelphia, Pennsylvania

- U.S. National Register of Historic Places
- U.S. Historic district
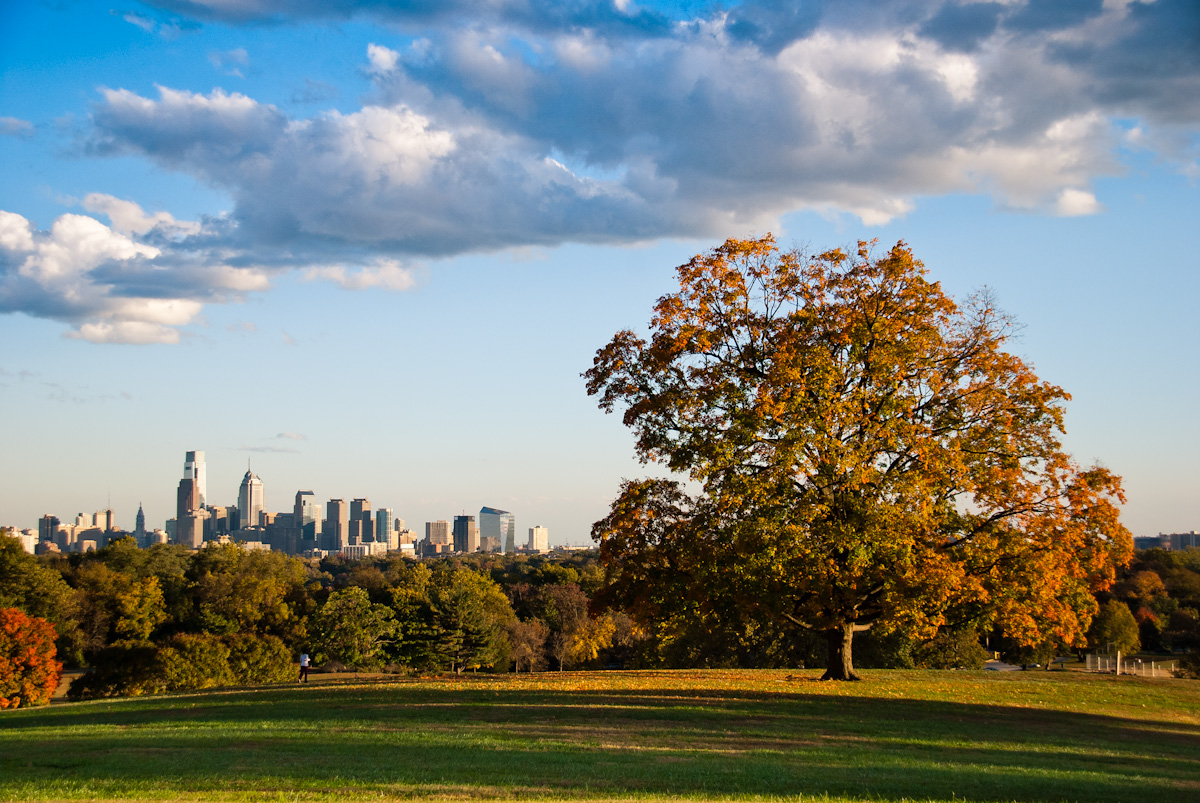
- Belmont Plateau view toward Center City

- Location within Philadelphia Location within Pennsylvania Location within the United States
- Location: Both banks of Schuylkill River and Wissahickon Creek, from Spring Garden St. to Northwestern Ave. in Philadelphia
- Coordinates: 39°59′22″N 75°12′10″W
- Area: Schuylkill River 2,052 acres (830 ha), Wissahickon Creek 2,042 acres (826 ha) (8.26 square kilometers)
- Built: 1812
- Architect: Robert Morris Copeland; Olmsted & Vaux et al.
- Architectural style: Colonial Revival, Georgian, Federal
- NRHP reference No.: 72001151
- Added to NRHP: February 7, 1972

Fairmount Park is the largest municipal park in Philadelphia, Pennsylvania, United States and the historic name for a group of parks located throughout the city. Fairmount Park consists of two park sections named East Park and West Park, divided by the Schuylkill River, with the two sections together totalling 2,052 acres (830 ha). Management of Fairmount Park and the entire citywide park system is overseen by Philadelphia Parks & Recreation, a city department created in 2010 from the merger of the Fairmount Park Commission and the Department of Recreation.

Many of the city's other parks had historically also been included in the Fairmount Park system prior to 2010, including Wissahickon Valley Park in Northwest Philadelphia, Pennypack Park in Northeast Philadelphia, Cobbs Creek Park in West Philadelphia, Franklin Delano Roosevelt Park in South Philadelphia, and 58 additional parks, parkways, plazas, squares, and public golf courses spread throughout the city. Since the 2010 merger, however, the term "Fairmount Park system" is no longer used by the Parks & Recreation department, and the adjacent Wissahickon Valley Park and all other park areas are considered completely separate entities.

== History ==
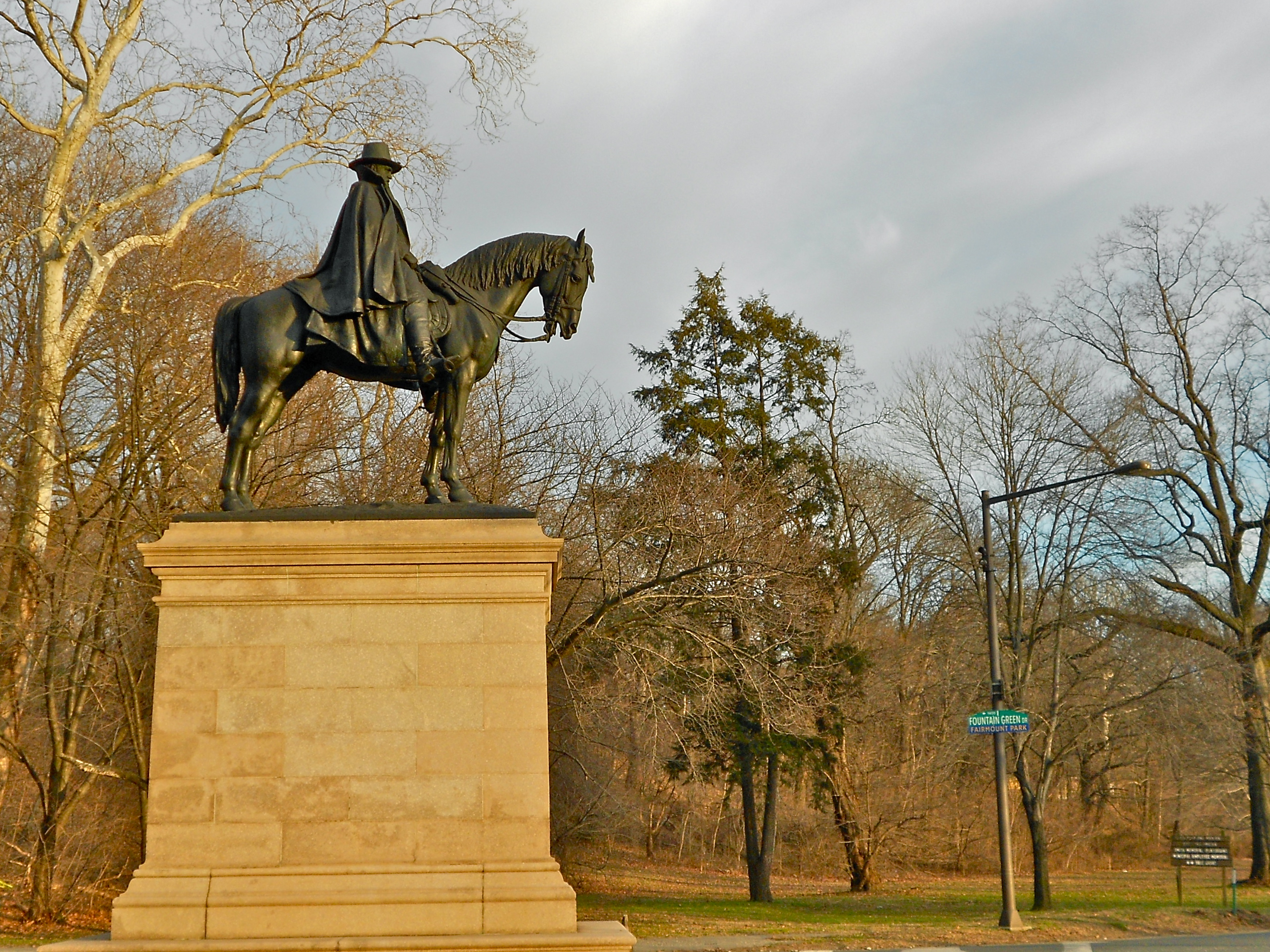
Equestrian statue of Ulysses S. Grant by Daniel Chester French and Edward Clark Potter

Fairmount Park, Philadelphia's first park, occupies 2,052 acres (830 ha) adjacent to the banks of the Schuylkill River. Since 2010, Philadelphia Parks & Recreation divides the original park into East and West Fairmount parks. The original domain of Fairmount Park consisted of three areas: South Park or the South Garden immediately below the Fairmount Water Works extending to the Callowhill Street Bridge; Old Park, which encompassed the former estates of Lemon Hill and Sedgeley; and West Park, the area including the Philadelphia Zoo, and the Centennial Exposition grounds. The South Garden predated the establishment of the Park Commission in 1867, while Lemon Hill and Sedgeley were added in 1855–56. After the American Civil War, work progressed on acquiring and laying out West Park. In the 1870s, the Fairmount Park Commission expropriated properties along the Wissahickon Creek to extend Fairmount Park. The Schuylkill River Trail is a modern paved multi-use trail by Kelly Drive in the East Park.

The Belmont Plateau Cross Country Course is located in Fairmount Park. The 1923 and 1976 USA Cross Country Championships were held in the park. The Philadelphia FIFA Fan Festival for the 2026 FIFA World Cup was held at the park.

=== Growth ===
East Fairmount Park

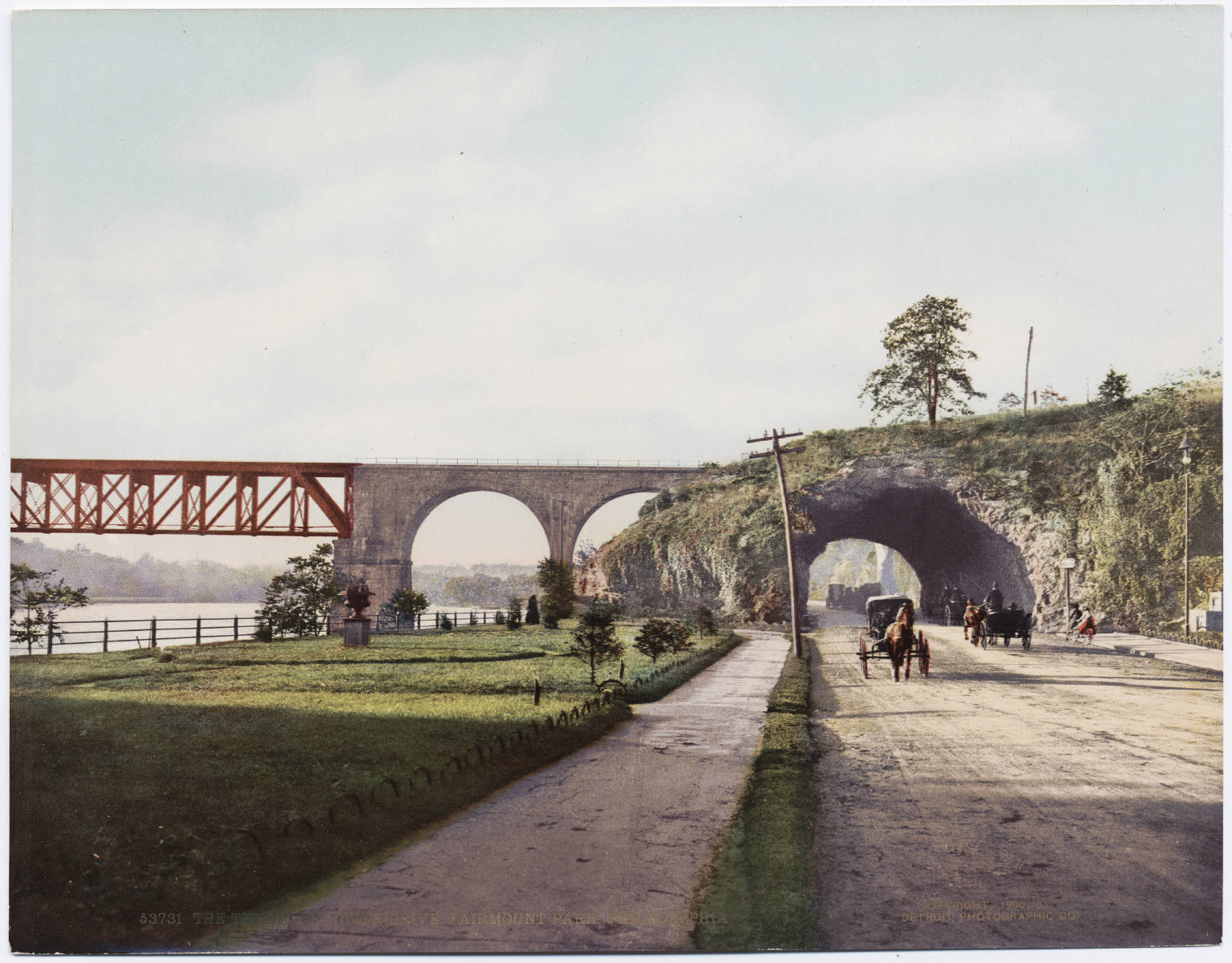
1900

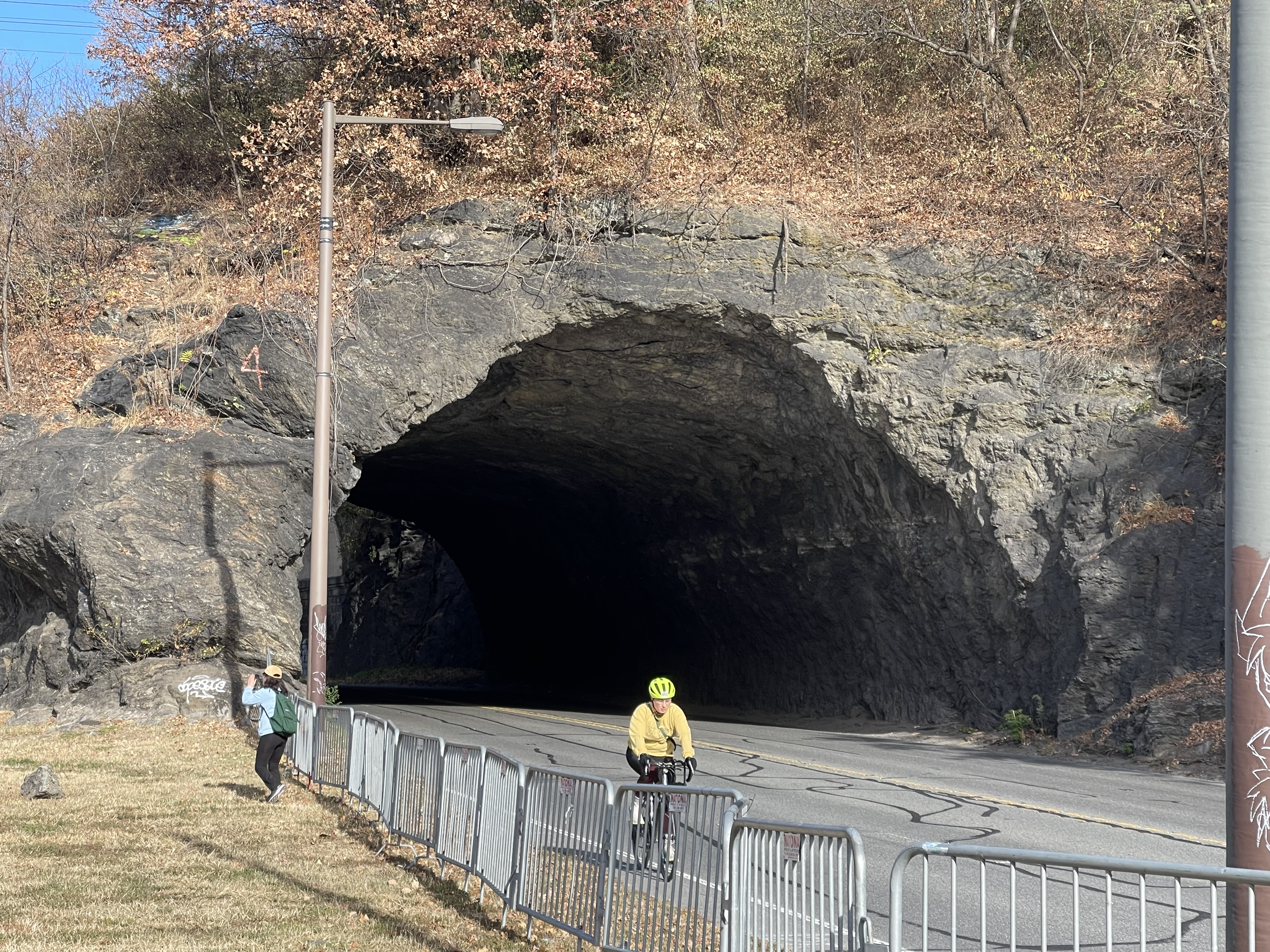
2024

The park grew out of the Lemon Hill estate of Henry Pratt, whose land was originally owned by Robert Morris, signer of the Declaration of Independence. Purchased by the city in 1844, the estate was dedicated to the public by city council's ordinance on September 15, 1855. A series of state and local legislative acts over the next three years increased the holdings of the city. In 1858, the city held a design competition to re-landscape Lemon Hill and Sedgeley for public use as the best way to better protect the city's water supply. (Ironically the land the Sedgeley mansion was built on had originally been owned by Robert Morris although after his bankruptcy it had been sold to a different purchaser then Henry Pratt).

The park was the site of the 1876 Centennial Exposition and the first zoo in the United States, the Philadelphia Zoo, and was placed on the National Register of Historic Places in 1972. Wissahickon Valley Park, located adjacent to the park's immediate northwest, was included in the Fairmount Park NRHP registration document.

== In popular culture ==
The outdoor scenes of the 2000 period art-horror film A Chronicle of Corpses were shot in Carpenter's Woods in the Wissahickon Valley Park part of Fairmount Park.

== Properties ==
Park properties include the Centennial Arboretum, a Horticulture Center, Fairmount Water Works, Memorial Hall (home of the Please Touch Museum), Shofuso Japanese House and Garden, Boathouse Row, Smith Memorial Arch, Smith Memorial Playground and Playhouse, recreation centers, reservoirs, statues and other pieces of art.

=== Public art ===
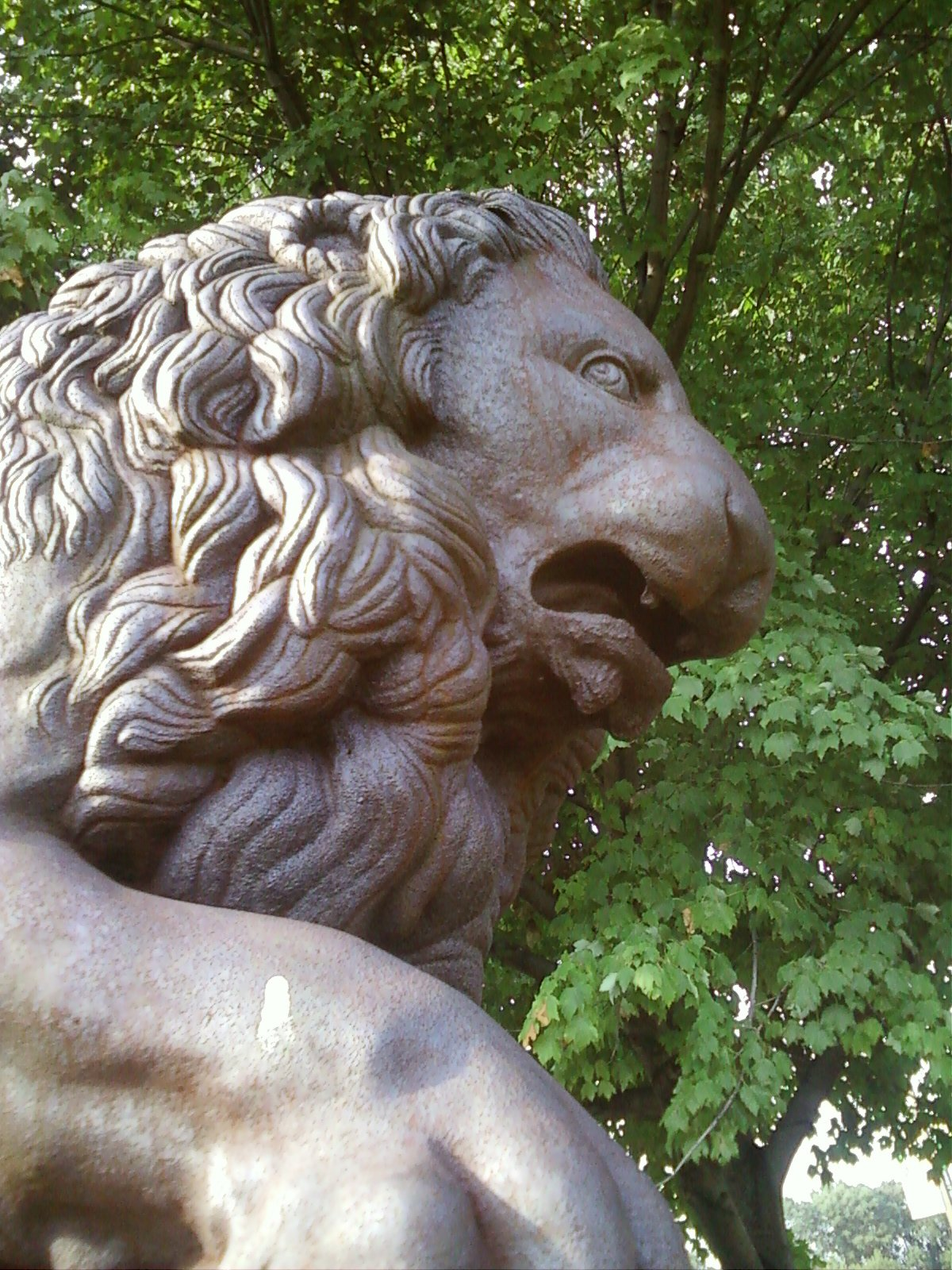
One of the Florentine Lions

Fairmount Park is home to a large collection of public art, largely attributable to efforts of the Association for Public Art, known previously as the Fairmount Park Art Association, a non-profit organization founded in 1872 to embellish Fairmount Park with outdoor sculpture, including the Medici lions known as the Florentine Lions installed in 1887. The Art Association continues to commission and care for a large number of sculptures, in coordination with the park and city. In 2007, the Art Association installed Iroquois by Mark di Suvero near the Philadelphia Museum of Art on the Benjamin Franklin Parkway.

=== Historic houses ===
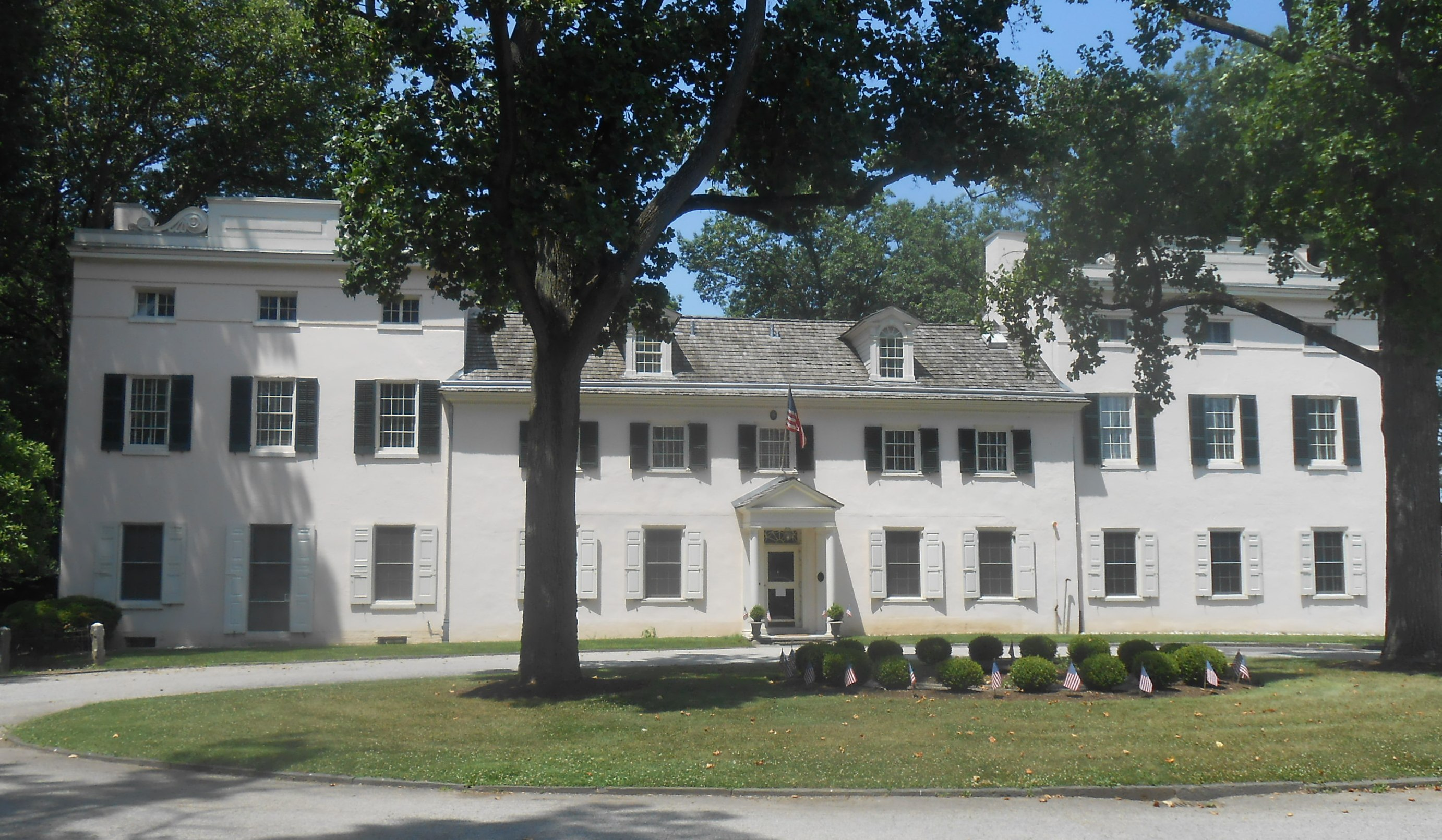
Strawberry Mansion

Mount Pleasant, built in 1762–65 for a Scottish ship captain named John Macpherson, is administered by the Philadelphia Museum of Art. The Art Museum also administers Cedar Grove Mansion, a house built in 1748–50 in what later became the Frankford neighborhood of the city. Cedar Grove was relocated to the park in 1926–1928.

Other historic houses in the park, listed by year of construction, include Boelson Cottage (1678–84), The Lilacs (c. 1711), Letitia Street House (c. 1713), Ridgeland Mansion (1719), Belmont Mansion (1745), The Cliffs (1753; ruins since a fire in 1986), Woodford Mansion (1756), Hatfield House (1760), Randolph House (c. 1767; renamed Laurel Hill Mansion in 1976), Strawberry Mansion (c. 1783–89), The Solitude (1784–85; located within the zoo), Sweetbriar Mansion (1797), Ormiston Mansion (1798), Lemon Hill Mansion (1800), Chamounix Mansion (1802), Rockland Mansion (c. 1810), and the Ohio House which was built for the Centennial Exposition of 1876.

Sedgeley Mansion was built in 1799 on Lemon Hill, then abandoned and later demolished after being acquired through eminent domain by the city in 1857. The Sedgeley property also included a servant's cottage constructed of stone which still exists. The cottage was designed by Benjamin Henry Latrobe and is presently known as the Sedgeley Porter's House.

== See also ==
- Ellen Phillips Samuel Memorial
- Fletcher Street Urban Riding Club
- List of parks in Philadelphia
- List of urban parks by size
- Philadelphia Aquarium
- Sedgley Woods
- Subaru Cherry Blossom Festival of Greater Philadelphia
