= Hatfield House (Philadelphia, Pennsylvania) =

Historic house in Pennsylvania, United States

- U.S. National Register of Historic Places
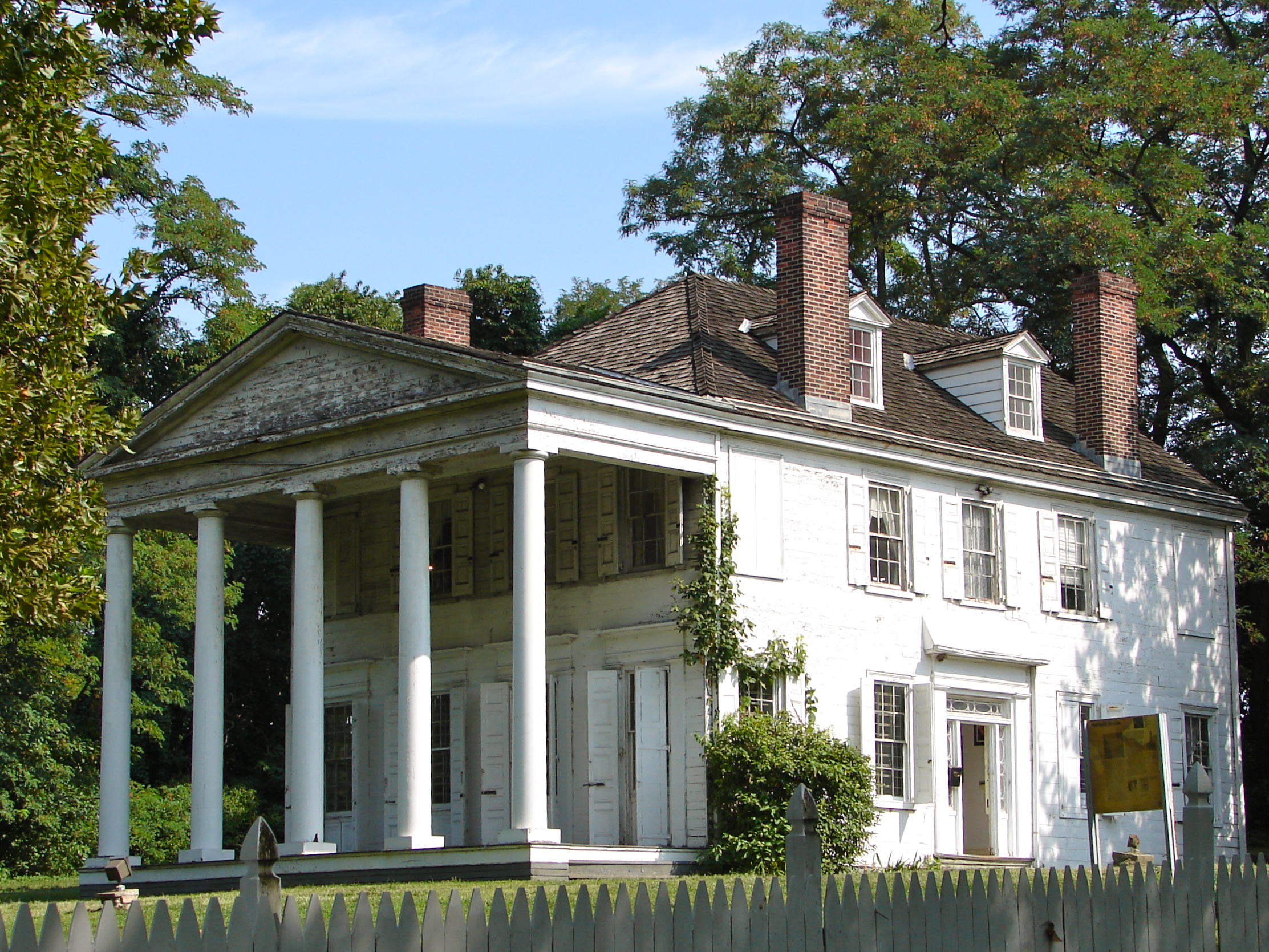
- Hatfield House in 2010.

- Location within Philadelphia Location within Pennsylvania Location within the United States
- Location: Fairmount Park, 33rd Street near Girard Avenue, Philadelphia, Pennsylvania
- Coordinates: 39°58′33″N 75°11′18″W
- Area: less than one acre
- Built: 1760; 1838
- Architectural style: Colonial Revival, Greek Revival
- NRHP reference No.: 72001157
- Added to NRHP: March 16, 1972

The Hatfield House is an historic house which is located in Fairmount Park in Philadelphia, Pennsylvania.

It was added to the National Register of Historic Places on March 16, 1972.

== History ==
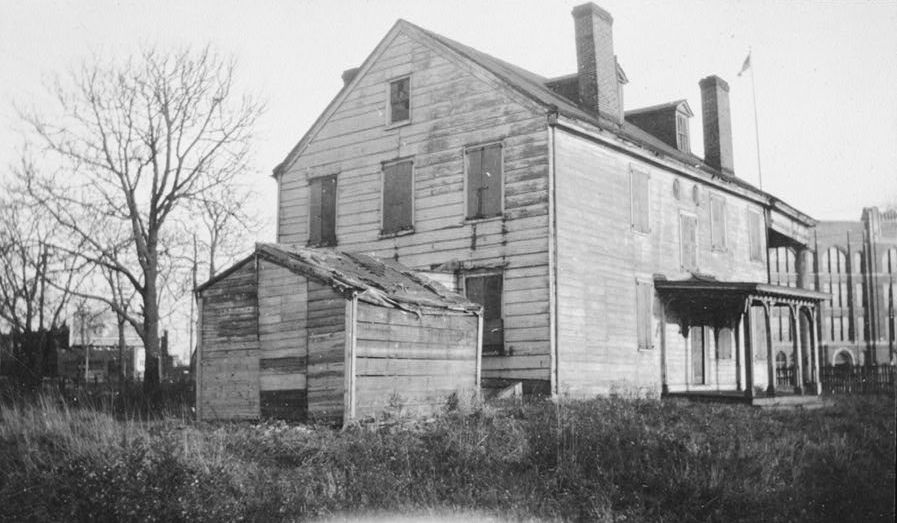
Original location of Hatfield House, 1929, with Simon Gratz High School in the background.

Built as a suburban villa in 1760, in what is now the Nicetown neighborhood of the city, Hatfield House operated as Catherine Mallon's Boarding School for Girls from 1806 to 1824. William J. Hay, who was the next owner, subsequently made major Greek Revival-style alterations, including the addition of the unusual 5-column temple portico in 1838.

In 1854, Dr. Nathan L. Hatfield, of the University of Pennsylvania, bought the residence; it then remained in the possession of his family for seventy-five years.

This house appears on the 1843 Ellet Map of Philadelphia County, on the south side of Nicetown Road (Hunting Park Avenue), east of the Philadelphia and Germantown Rail Road and west of the Germantown and Perkiomen Turnpike (Germantown Avenue).

By the time that the 1855 Barnes Map was created, the city's street grid was also shown, although few of the streets yet existed. By 1862, a horse-drawn streetcar line passed a block east of the house.

In 1925, the Simon Gratz High School was built directly east of the house. Four years later, Major Henry Reed Hatfield donated the house to Fairmount Park Commission.

In 1930, the building was dismantled and moved one story at a time to its present site at 33rd Street and Girard Avenue. Architect Erling H. Pedersen, of the Philadelphia Museum of Art, managed the relocation.

== See also ==
- List of houses in Fairmount Park
- National Register of Historic Places listings in North Philadelphia
