= Philadelphia Register of Historic Places =

The Philadelphia Register of Historic Places (PRHP) is a register of historic places in Philadelphia by the Philadelphia Historical Commission. Buildings, structures, sites, objects, interiors and districts can be added to the list.

== Criteria ==
According to the Philadelphia Historical Commission, sites eligible for listing are those that possess any of the following:

1. Has significant character, interest or value as part of the development, heritage or cultural characteristics of the city, commonwealth or nation, or is associated with the life of a person significant in the past.
2. Associated with an event of importance to the history of the city, commonwealth or nation.
3. Reflects the environment in an era characterized by a distinctive architectural style.
4. Embodies distinguishing characteristics of an architectural style or engineering specimen.
5. Is the work of a designer, architect, landscape architect or designer, or engineer whose work has significantly influenced the historical, architectural, economic, social, or cultural development of the city, commonwealth or nation.
6. Contains elements of design, detail, materials or craftsmanship which represent a significant innovation.
7. Is part of or related to a square, park or other distinctive area which should be preserved according to a historic, cultural or architectural motif.
8. Represents an established and familiar visual feature of the neighborhood, community or city.
9. Has yielded, or may be likely to yield, information important in pre-history or history.
10. Exemplifies the cultural, political, economic, social or historical heritage of the community.

Properties listed on the Philadelphia Register of Historic Places may also be recognized on the National Register of Historic Places, be listed as a National Historic Landmark, or listed as a contributing property in a National Historic District.

== Philadelphia Historical Commission ==
The Philadelphia Historical Commission is the city agency responsible for overseeing the Philadelphia Register of Historic Places and ensuring the preservation of Philadelphia's historic resources including buildings, structures, sites, objects, interiors and districts.

== Current listings ==
The lists below contain selected notable properties on the Philadelphia Register of Historic Places:

=== Properties listed in the register by name ===
Properties that do not have an official address as assigned by Philadelphia's Office of Property Assessment (OPA).

Name	Image	Location	Designation Date	Description
Bachelors Barge Club		6 Boathouse Row; 39°58′9″N 75°11′13″W	January 5, 1984	Mediterranean-style boathouse built in 1894.
Bartram House with Garden and dependencies		1650 S 53rd St; 39.932086°N 75.212326°W	June 26, 1956	
Belmont Mansion		2000 Belmont Mansion Dr; 39.990938°N 75.213043°W	June 26, 1956	
Benjamin Franklin Bridge		200 N 5th St; 39.953956°N 75.140257°W	December 12, 2003	
Boelson Cottage		1 M L King Dr; 39.989649°N 75.202941°W	May 28, 1963	
Cedar Grove Mansion		4001 Lansdowne Dr; 39.979162°N 75.204385°W	June 26, 1956	
Chamounix Mansion		3250 Chamounix Dr; 40.003789°N 75.196359°W	June 26, 1956	
Christopher Columbus Statue		2700 S Broad St. 39.915548°N 75.172079°W	March 10, 2017	
College Boat Club of the University of Pennsylvania	Aerial view of Number 11 Boathouse Row, the home of the College Boat Club of the University of Pennsylvania.	11 Boathouse Row; 39.969572°N 75.188371°W	January 5, 1984	
Crescent Boat Club		5 Boathouse Row; 39.969326°N 75.186586°W	January 5, 1984	
Dickens and Little Nell Statue, Clark Park		Clark Park; 4400 Chester Ave; 39.9486°N 75.2094°W	October 12, 2001	One of only two life-sized sculptures of Charles Dickens. He had requested there not be any public memorials to him.
Dream Garden Glass Mosaic, Curtis Center		170 S Independence W Mall; 39.948143°N 75.151256°W	November 30, 1998	
Eastern State Penitentiary		2101-99 Fairmount Ave; 39.968258°N 75.172660°W	May 7, 1981	
Fairmount Rowing Association		2-3 Boathouse Row; 39.969197°N 75.185894°W	January 5, 1984	
Fairmount Water Works		620-90 Aquarium Dr; 39.966347°N 75.183599°W	June 26, 1956	
Fort Mifflin		1 Fort Mifflin Rd; 39.875589°N 75.212908°W	June 26, 1956	
Founders Memorial Bell	The John Wanamaker Memorial Founder's Bell	1 S Broad St; 39.951169°N 75.163486°W	June 14, 2000	
Frankford Avenue Bridge over the Pennypack Creek		8350 Frankford Ave; 40.043544°N 75.020540°W	June 30, 1970	
Hatfield House		3201 W Girard Ave; 39.975954°N 75.188327°W	June 26, 1956	
Hermitage		700 Hermit Ln; 40.024525°N 75.200433°W	May 28, 1963	
Horse Trough at 147 N 2nd St		Fireman's Hall Museum; 147 N 2nd St; 39°57′11.68″N 75°8′35.09″W	December 12, 2003	
Horse Trough at 315 S 9th St		315 S 9th St; 39.944984°N 75.156484°W	February 23, 1971	
Laurel Hill Mansion		7201 Edgeley Dr; 39.991408°N 75.194898°W	June 26, 1956	
Lemon Hill Mansion		1 Lemon Hill Dr; 39.970747°N 75.187149°W	June 26, 1956	
Malta Boat Club		9 Boathouse Row; 39.969568°N 75.187966°W	January 5, 1984	
Memorial Hall		4231 N Concourse Dr; 39.979602°N 75.209255°W	July 6, 1978	
Mount Pleasant Mansion		3800 Mount Pleasant Dr; 39.983388°N 75.199773°W	June 26, 1956	
New Market Headhouse		400 S 2nd St; 39.942966°N 75.145271°W	June 26, 1956	
Ohio State Building		1700 Belmont Ave; 39.985045°N 75.216185°W	May 28, 1963	
Ormiston Mansion		2000 Reservoir Dr; 39.988711°N 75.196330°W	June 26, 1956	
Penn Athletic Club Rowing Association		12 Boathouse Row; 39.969615°N 75.188590°W	January 5, 1984	
Pennsylvania Barge Club		4 Boathouse Row; 39.969291°N 75.186578°W	January 5, 1984	
Pennsylvania Railroad War Memorial, Angel of the Resurrection at 30th Street Station		1 N 30th St; 39.955714°N 75.181905°W	September 12, 2001	
Philadelphia Girls Rowing Club		14 Boathouse Row; 39.969754°N 75.189223°W	January 5, 1984	
Philadelphia Museum of Art		2500 Spring Garden St; 39.965799°N 75.181249°W	June 29, 1971	
Ridgeland (Mount Prospect)		4100 Chamounix Dr; 39°59′33″N 75°12′37″W	June 26, 1956	
Rittenhouse Town, Abraham Rittenhouse House		206 Lincoln Dr; 40.029929°N 75.189562°W	June 7, 1973	
Rittenhouse Town, barn		210 Lincoln Dr; 40.029050°N 75.192111°W	June 7, 1973	
Rittenhouse Town, house		208 Lincoln Dr; 40.029670°N 75.190520°W	June 7, 1973	
Rittenhouse Town, house		210 Lincoln Dr; 40.028759°N 75.191513°W	June 7, 1973	
Rittenhouse Town, Jacob Rittenhouse House		209 Lincoln Dr; 40.029520°N 75.190928°W	June 7, 1973	
Rittenhouse Town, William Rittenhouse House		207 Lincoln Dr; 40.029464°N 75.189733°W	June 26, 1956	
Rockland Mansion		3810 Mount Pleasant Dr; 39.985830°N 75.199783°W	May 31, 1960	
Rodin Museum		2201-99 Ben Franklin Pkwy; 39.961942°N 75.173954°W	June 29, 1971	
Sedgeley Club		15 Boathouse Row; 39.969899°N 75.189755°W	January 5, 1984	
Sedgeley Porter's House		3250 Sedgeley Dr; 39.974456°N 75.188890°W	May 31, 1960	Porter's House of the demolished Sedgeley Mansion
Shofuso Japanese House and Garden		4301 Lansdowne Dr; 39.981411°N 75.212894°W	June 14, 2013	
Smith Memorial Playhouse		3500 Reservoir Dr; 39.981740°N 75.195712°W	May 5, 1977	
St. Augustine Costaggini Paintings St. Joseph and Our Mother of Consolation, St. Augustine's Church		246-60 N 4th St; 39.955526°N 75.146486°W	April 8, 2016	
St. Augustine Frescos, St. Augustine's Church		246-60 N 4th St; 39.955526°N 75.146486°W	July 10, 2015	
Strawberry Mansion		2450 Strawberry Mansion Dr; 39.994416°N 75.190641°W	June 26, 1956	
Strawberry Mansion Bridge		1 Strawberry Mansion Bridge Dr; 39.995311°N 75.194017°W	September 7, 1978	
Swann Memorial Fountain, Logan Square		1900 Ben Franklin Pkwy; 39.957963°N 75.170616°W	June 29, 1971	
Sweetbriar Mansion		3801 Lansdowne Dr; 39.976979°N 75.200787°W	June 26, 1956	
The Cliffs (in ruins, fire on 2/22/1986)		3400 Reservoir Dr; 39.979413°N 75.194107°W	June 26, 1956	Ruins since a fire on February 22, 1986.
The Exaltation of St. Joseph into Heaven, painting at Old St. Joseph's Church		321-27 Willings Aly; 39.946678°N 75.147661°W	December 12, 2014	
The Lilacs		3600 Greenland Dr; 39.998776°N 75.196469°W	June 26, 1956	
The Monastery		1024 Kitchens La; 40.036145°N 75.203499°W	June 26, 1956	
The Solitude		3400 W Girard Ave; 39.9726°N 75.1955°W	June 26, 1956	1784–85; original owner and architect was John Penn, grandson of William Penn; within the Philadelphia Zoo.
Thomas Mill Covered Bridge over the Wissahickon Creek		1 Thomas Mill Rd; 40.071889°N 75.225643°W	June 28, 1957	
Undine Barge Club		13 Boathouse Row; 39.969689°N 75.188916°W	January 5, 1984	
University Avenue Bridge		1000 University Ave; 39.942764°N 75.196934°W	July 14, 1993	
University Barge Club		7-8 Boathouse Row; 39.969415°N 75.187392°W	January 5, 1984	
Valley Green Inn		1 Wissahickon Dr; 40.054169°N 75.218235°W	March 28, 1967	
Venice Island Performing Arts & Recreation Center		1 Rector St; 40.023187°N 75.221578°W	December 14, 1983	
Vesper Boat Club		10 Boathouse Row; 39.969436°N 75.188017°W	January 5, 1984	
Walnut Lane Bridge over Lincoln Drive		500 W Walnut La; 40.032970°N 75.187830°W	March 1, 1979	Spans Lincoln Drive and Monoshone Creek.
Walnut Lane Bridge over the Wissahickon Creek		900 W Walnut La; 40.032280°N 75.199621°W	August 9, 2008	Spans Wissahickon Creek.
Wanamaker Eagle, Grand Court, Wanamaker Building		Wanamaker Building; 1300 Market St; 39°57′5.98″N 75°9′43.81″W	September 12, 2001	
Washington Fountain, Eakins Oval		2601-99 Ben Franklin Pkwy; 39.964261°N 75.179158°W	June 29, 1971	
Weightman Hall, University of Pennsylvania		235 S 33rd St; 39.950677°N 75.190765°W	February 7, 1974	Franklin Field Complex
Wissahickon Memorial Bridge		4200 Henry Ave; 40.023896°N 75.195887°W	October 12, 2001	Carries Henry Avenue across the Wissahickon Creek; aka Henry Avenue Bridge.
Woodford Mansion		3400 Woodford Dr; 39.993163°N 75.187727°W	June 26, 1956	
WPA Murals		1801 Vine St., Philadelphia; 39.959377°N 75.169454°W	May 13, 2011	37 murals located in the Family Court Building; building is being converted to a hotel.

=== Properties listed in the register by address ===
The complete list contains over 13,000 sites.

Name	Image	Location	Description
1616 Walnut Street Building		1616–26 Walnut St.	
Oliver H. Bair Funeral Home		1818–20 Chestnut St.	
Belgravia Hotel		1811–19 Chestnut St.	
Boyd Theatre		1910 Chestnut St.	
Carpenter Station		201 Carpenter Ln.	
Centennial National Bank		3140–42 Market St.	The bank of the Centennial Exposition. It was designed by the renowned architect Frank Furness.
Church of St. Luke and The Epiphany		318–30 S. 13th St.	
Congregation B'nai Abraham		523-527 Lombard St.	
Drake Hotel		1512–14 Spruce St.	
Family Court Building		1801 Vine St.	
Gravers Station		300 E. Gravers Ln.	
Greenwood Cemetery		930 Adams Ave.	
Guild House		711–39 Spring Garden St.	
Loews Philadelphia Hotel		1200 Market St.	Philadelphia Savings Fund Society building
Carl Mackley Houses		1401 E. Bristol St.	
Mount Moriah Cemetery gates		1801 Cemetery Ave.	
Philadelphia Canoe Club		4600 Ridge Ave.	
The Philadelphia Club		1301–03 Walnut St.	
Philadelphia Episcopal Cathedral		13–19 S. 38th St.	Listed as Church of the Savior
Philadelphia Sketch Club		233–37 S. Camac St.	
Ruan House		4278 Griscom St.	
Sigma Sound Studios		210-12 N. 12th St.	Recording studio known as the "birthplace of the 'Philly Sound.'"
Sun Oil Building		1608–14 Walnut St.	
The Touraine		1520–28 Spruce St.	
Tulpehocken Station		314 W. Tulpehocken St.	
Union Bank of Philadelphia Building		249–53 Arch St.	The building was used to house the cast of The Real World: Philadelphia in 2004–05.
United States Custom House		200–32 Chestnut St.	
The Warwick		1701–15 Locust St.	
Wetherill Mansion		251 S. 18th St.	
Wissahickon		5215–31 Schuyler St.	

== Historic districts ==
Historic districts listed on the Philadelphia Register of Historic Places:

Name	Image	Designation Year
1416-32 West Girard Avenue Historic District		2018
420 Row - 420 to 434 South 42nd Street Historic District		2017
4208-30 Chester Avenue Historic District		2022
Automobile Row Historic District		2021
Awbury Historic District		2010
Carnegie Library Thematic Historic District		2021
Central Mt. Airy Commercial Historic District		2021
Chester Regent Historic District		2019
Chestnut Street East Commercial Historic District		2021
Christian Street/Black Doctors Row Historic District		2022
Conwell House Block Historic District		2022
Diamond Street Historic District		1996
Drexel-Govett Historic District		2022
East Logan Street Historic District		2010
F.D.R. Park Historic District		2000
French Village Historic District		2021
Gardiner-Poth Historic District		2021
Gates Street Historic District		2022
Germantown Urban Village		2024
Girard Estate Historic District		1999
Greenbelt Knoll Historic District		2006
Historic Paving Street Thematic District		1998
House of St. Michael & All Angels Historic District		2023
Manayunk Main Street Historic District		1984
Manheim Square Historic District		2021
Northwest Philadelphia Apartments Thematic Historic District		2025
Old City Historic District		2003
Overbrook Farms Historic District		2019
Park Avenue Historic District		1990
Parkside Historic District		2009
Powelton Village Historic District		2022
Ridge Avenue Roxborough Thematic Historic District		2018
Rittenhouse Fitler Historic District		1995
Satterlee Heights Historic Districts		2018
Society Hill Historic District		1999
Southeast Spruce Hill Historic District		2024
Spring Garden Historic District		2001
Tudor East Falls Historic District		2009
Victorian Roxborough Historic District		2022
Washington Square West Historic District		2024
Wayne Junction Historic District		2018

== See also ==
- List of National Historic Landmarks in Pennsylvania
- National Register of Historic Places listings in Pennsylvania
- National Register of Historic Places listings in Philadelphia, Pennsylvania
