= List of parks in Philadelphia =

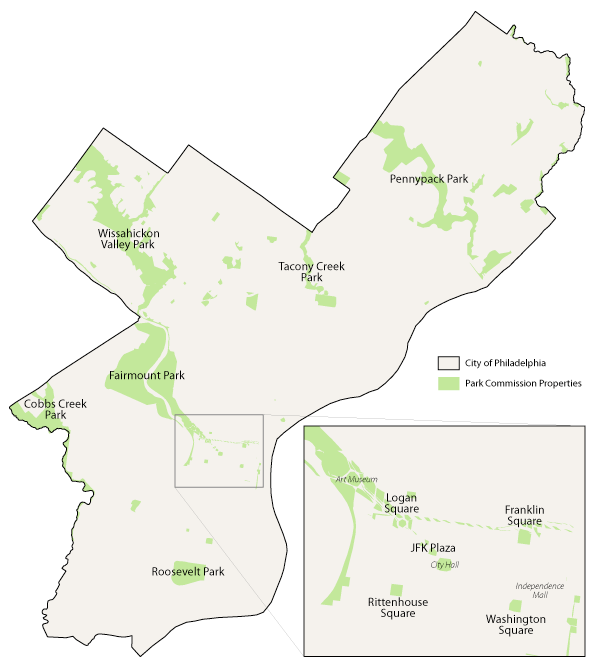
Map of the major parks within the city (click to enlarge)

Philadelphia has a total parkland—including city parks, squares, playgrounds, athletic fields, recreation centers and golf courses, plus state and federal parks—that amounts to 11,211 acres (45.37 km^{2}). The Fairmount Park system historically encompassed 63 park areas prior to 2010, including six city-owned public golf courses, along with the landscaped areas of the Benjamin Franklin Parkway, the Roosevelt Boulevard and the Southern Boulevard Parkway, two farms and the Manayunk Canal. Those 63 historic park areas have been included among 378 separate facilities which in turn contain the 7 large watershed parks (Fairmount and FDR Parks, plus the Wissahickon, Pennypack, Cobbs, Tacony and Poquessing Creek parks), 143 neighborhood parks and squares, 156 recreation centers and playgrounds, various playing fields, courts, rinks and swimming pools, 40 community gardens and orchards, as well as the six aforementioned golf courses. All facilities are administered by the Philadelphia Parks & Recreation department since a merger of the Fairmount Park Commission and the Department of Recreation in 2010. The new Parks & Recreation department also administers six older adult centers, three environmental education centers, 40 historic sites and 25 KEYSPOT computer labs.

In terms of total park area to population, Philadelphia is ranked ninth among the most densely populated cities in the United States with 7.2 park acres per 1000 residents, and fourth among the same cities in total acres of parkland, behind New York City, Los Angeles and Chicago. Philadelphia has reserved 13.5% of its city acreage for parkland, which is the eighth highest percentage among the most densely populated cities.

== List of parks ==
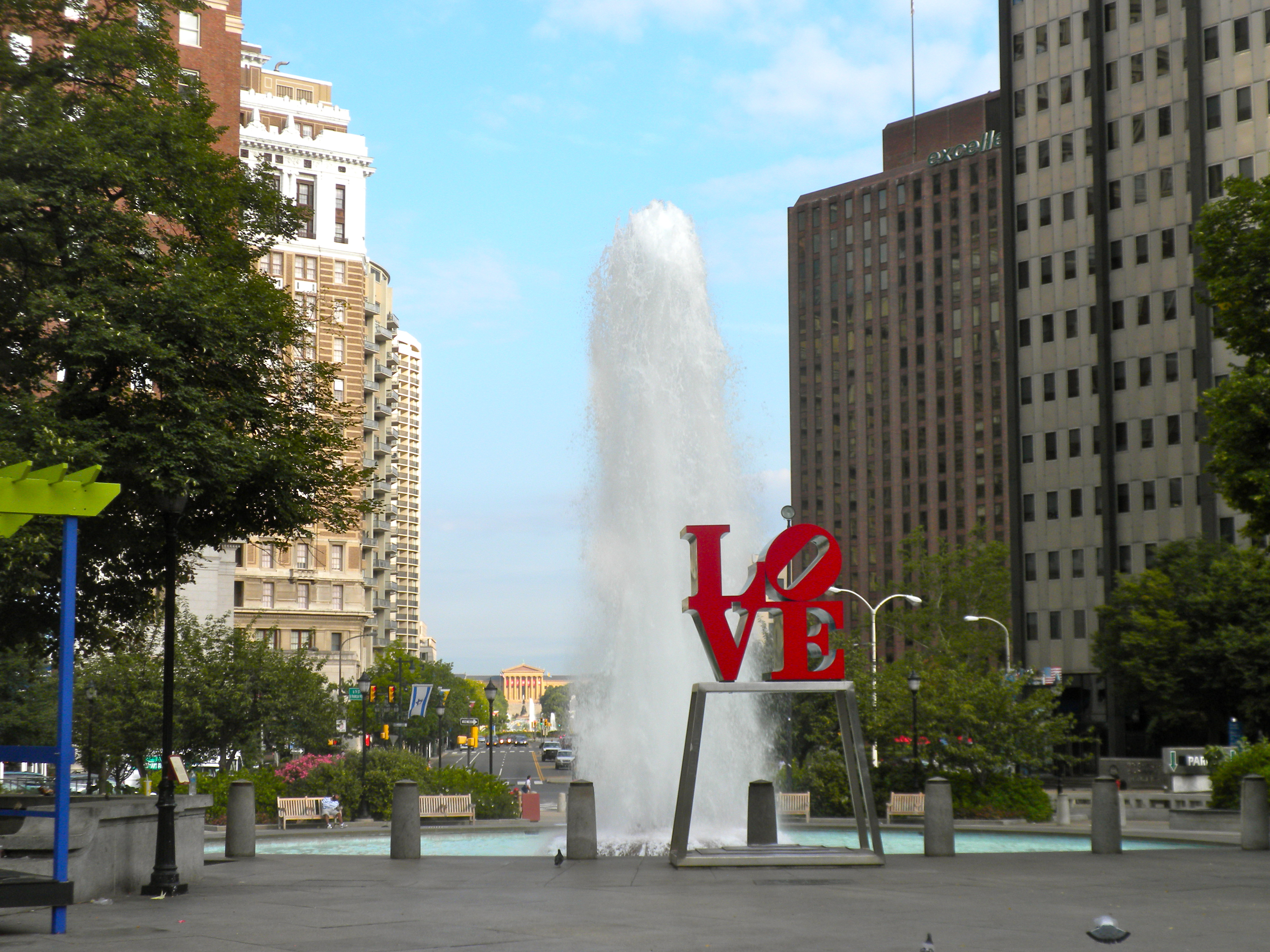
LOVE Park, officially called John F. Kennedy Plaza

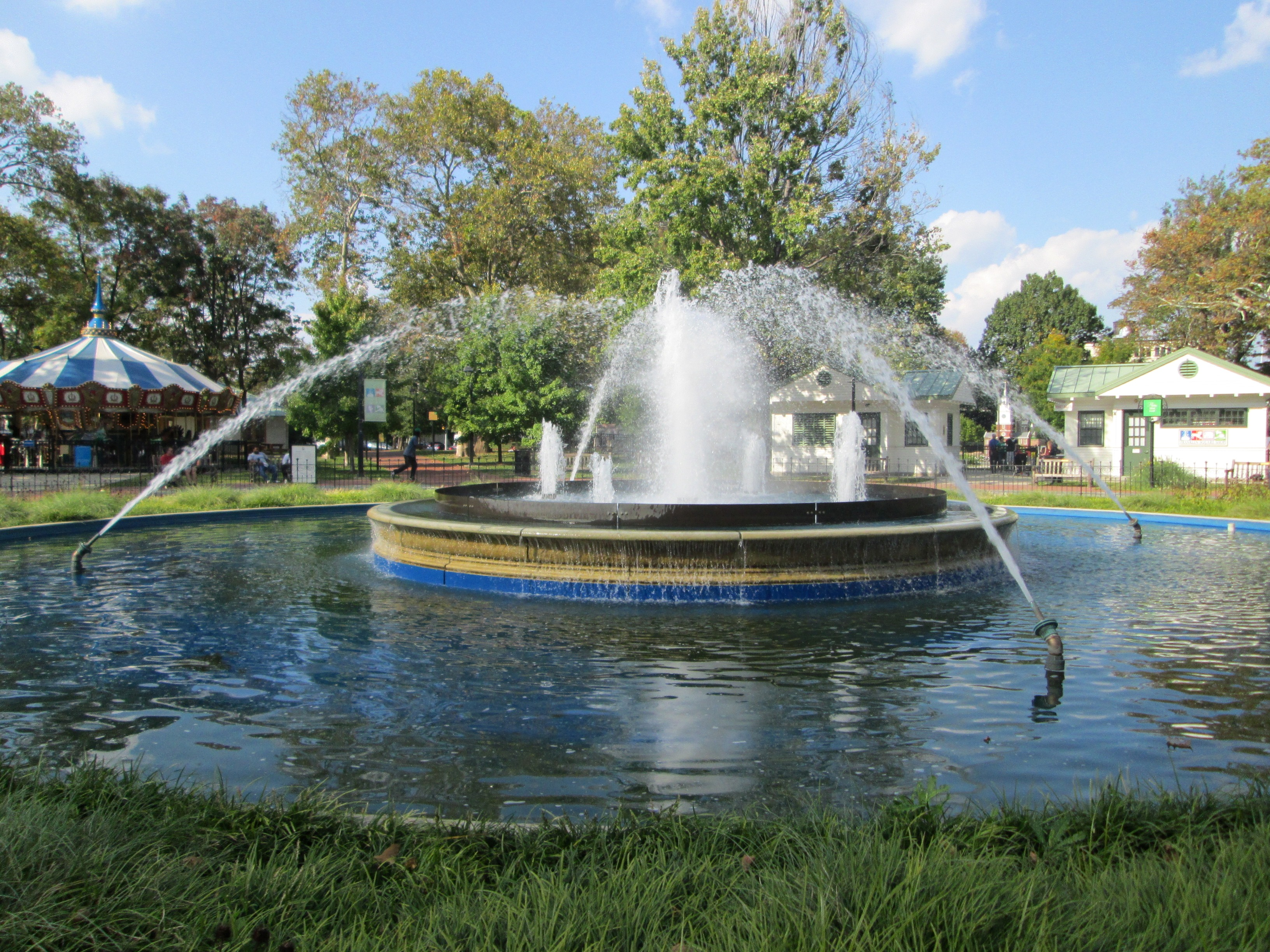
Franklin Square fountain

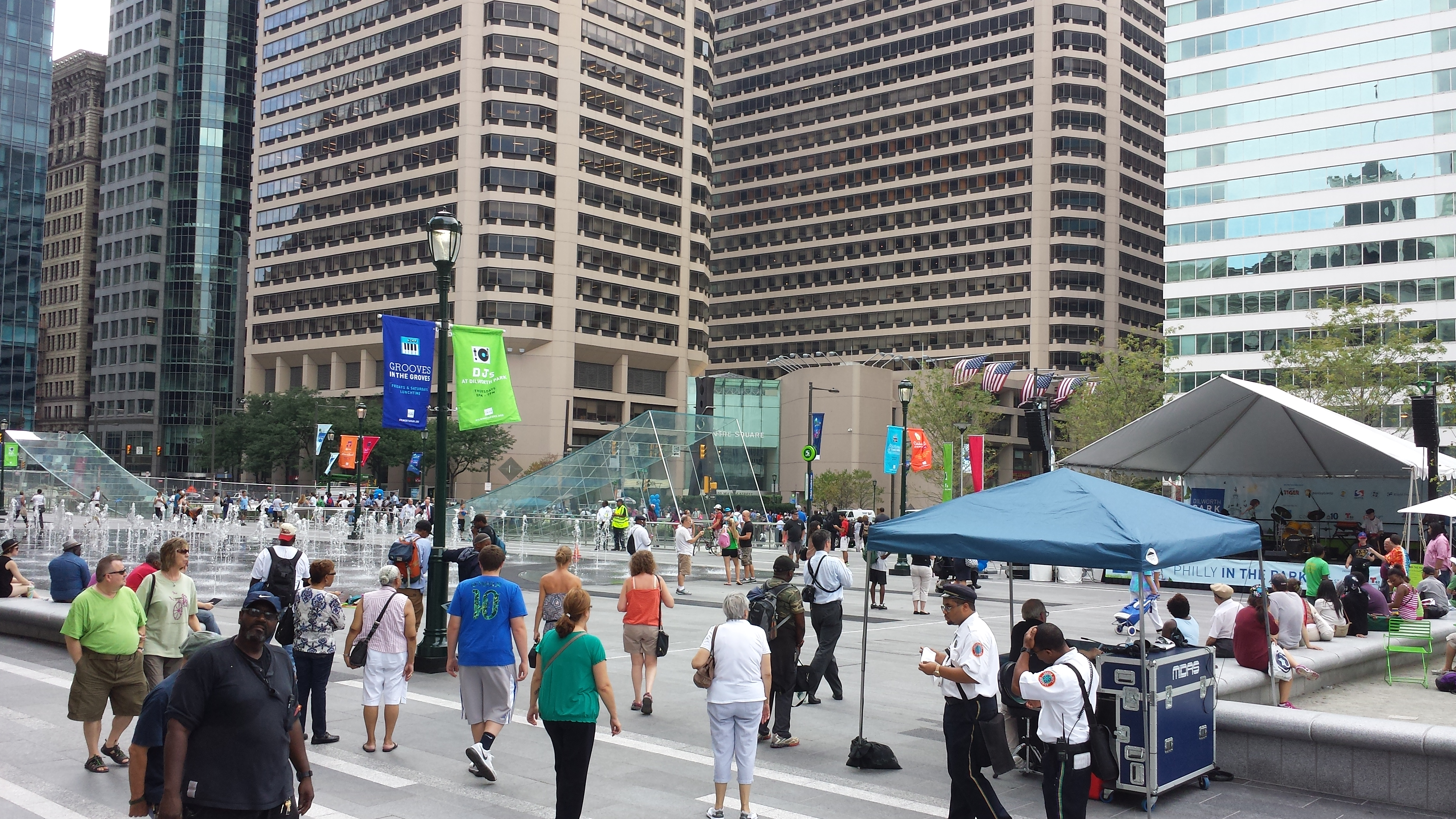
Dilworth Park during opening

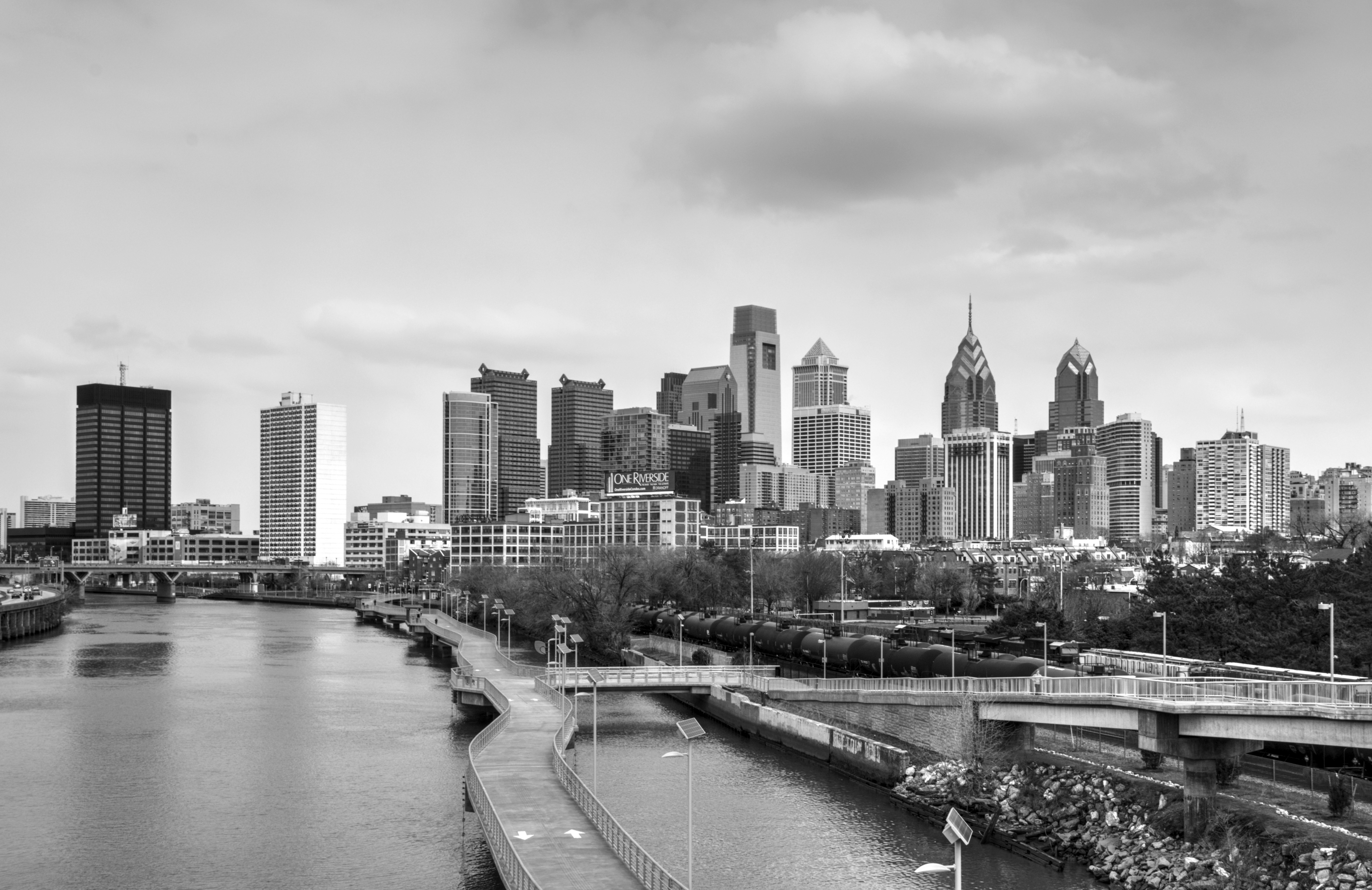
Schuylkill Banks boardwalk and Center City

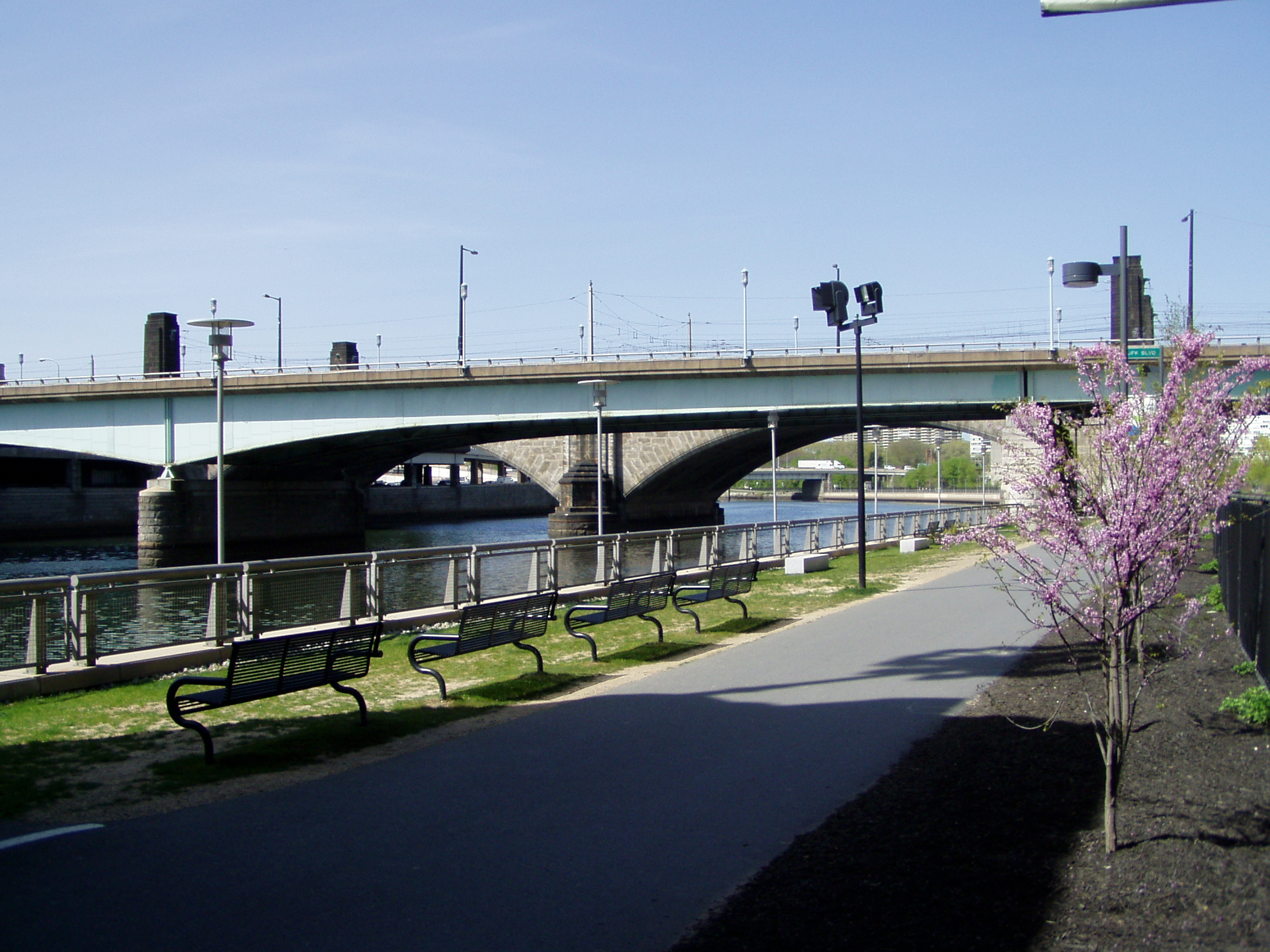
Schuylkill River Trail, Schuylkill Banks

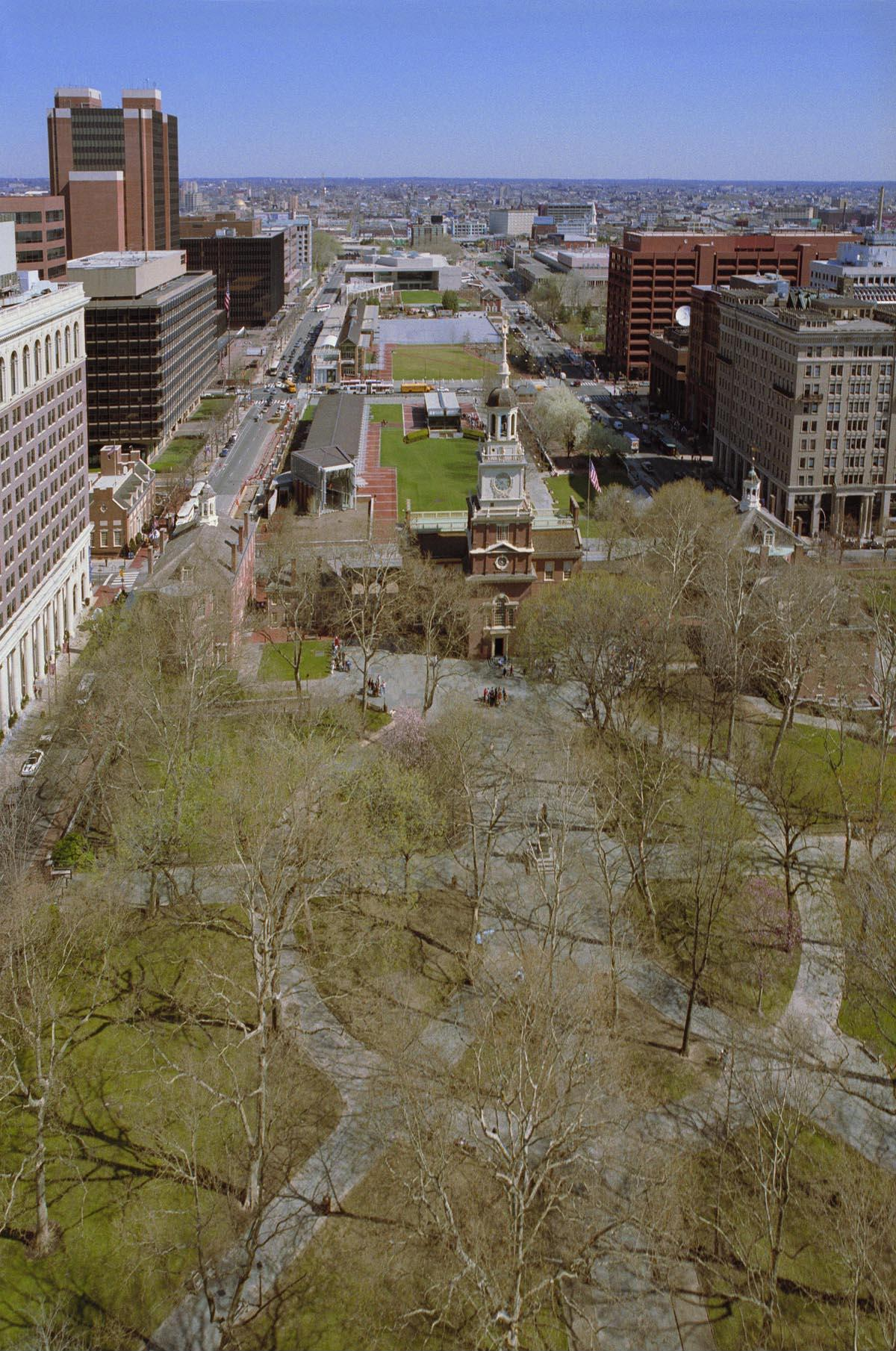
Independence Mall

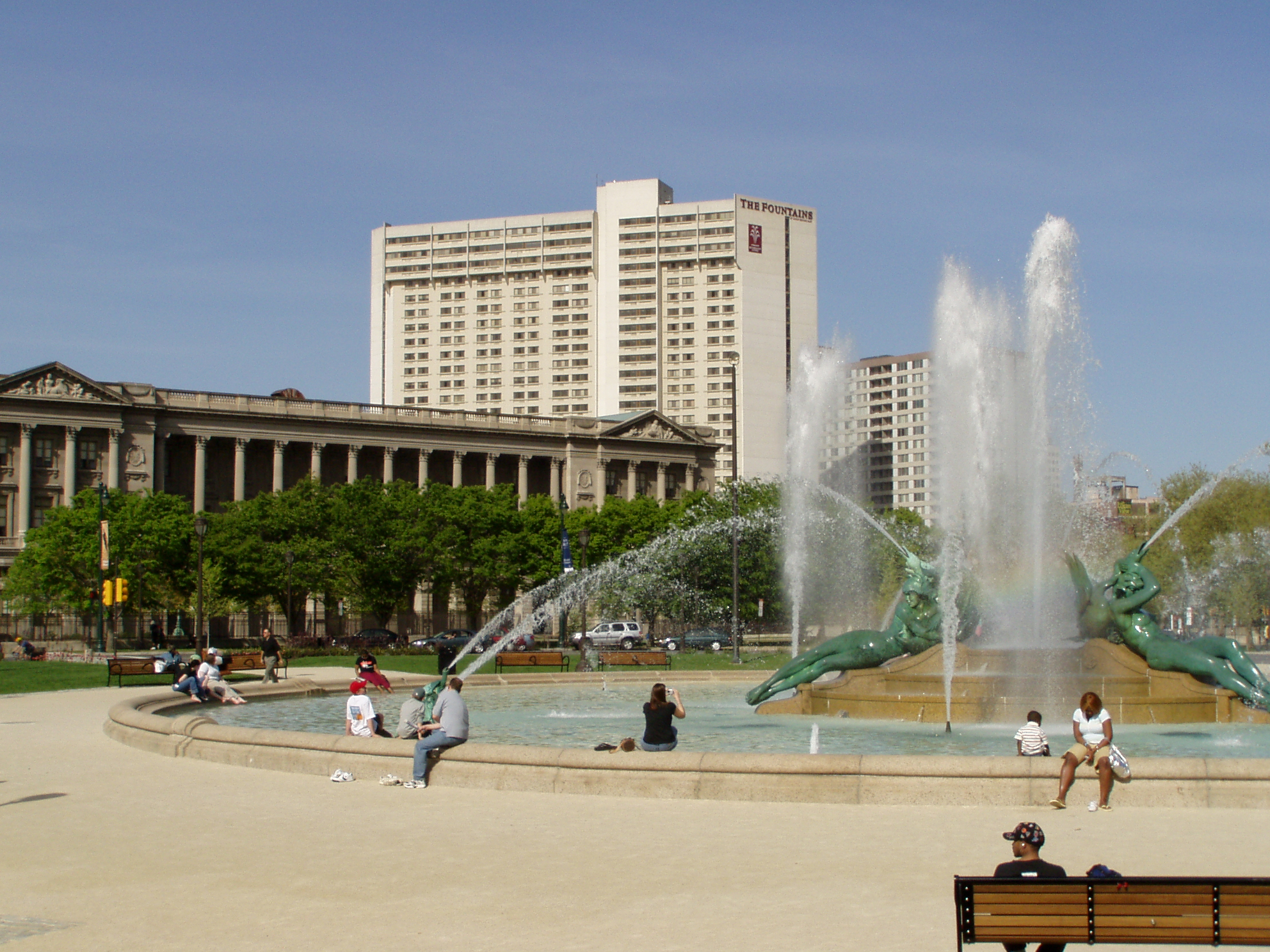
Swann Memorial Fountain in Logan Circle

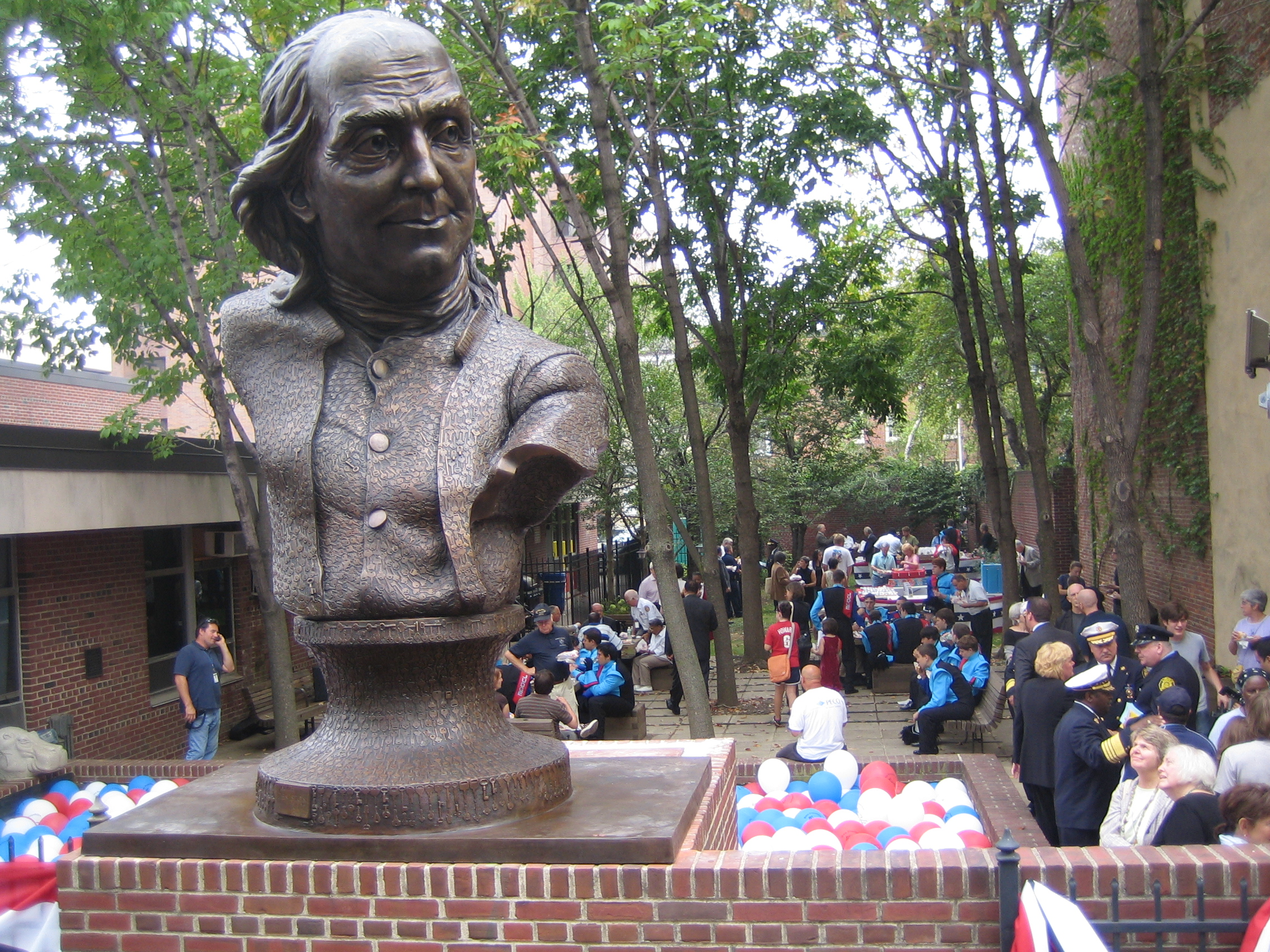
Girard Fountain Park and bronze bust of Benjamin Franklin

Park	Neighborhood / Area	Acres	Ref.
Fairmount Park	West	2052	
Wissahickon Valley Park	Northwest	2042	
Pennypack Park	Northeast	1343	
Cobbs Creek Park	West, Southwest	851	
Franklin Delano Roosevelt Park	South	348	
Tacony Creek Park	Northeast	304	
Benjamin Rush State Park	Northeast	275	
Poquessing Creek Park	Northeast	189	
Morris Park	Overbrook	147	
John Heinz National Wildlife Refuge at Tinicum	Southwest	145	‡
Morris Arboretum	Chestnut Hill	92	
Hunting Park	North	87	
Burholme Park	Northeast	85	
Awbury Arboretum	Germantown	55	
Independence National Historical Park	Center City	55	
Fernhill Park	Northwest	50	†
Bartram's Garden	Southwest	45	
Wissinoming Park	Northeast	42	
Wister's Woods	North	33	†
Penn Park	University City	24	
Fisher Park	North	23	
Marconi Plaza	South	23	†
Glen Foerd on the Delaware	Northeast	18	
Stenton Park	North	17	†
Pastorius Park	Chestnut Hill	16	
Makefield Park	North	15	†
Tacony Park	Northeast	13	†
Jardel Park	Northeast	12	†
Bradford Park	Northeast	9	†
Clark Park	West	9	
Malcolm X Park	West	6	
Kingsessing Park	Southwest	8.4	
Penn Treaty Park	Fishtown	8	
Schuylkill Banks	Center City, South, West	10	†
Franklin Square	Center City	9.6	†
Logan Circle (and surrounding square)	Center City	9.6	†
Rittenhouse Square	Center City	8.3	†
Washington Square	Center City	8.3	†
Eakins Oval	Center City	8	
LOVE Park (JFK Plaza)	Center City	3.4	†
Schuylkill River Park	Center City	3	†
Dilworth Park	Center City	2.8	†
Franklin's Paine Skatepark	Center City	2.5	
Sister Cities Park	Center City	2	†
Matthias Baldwin Park	Baldwin Park	2	†
Race Street Pier	Center City	1	†
John F. Collins Park	Center City	0.1	†
Korean War Memorial Park	Penn's Landing	4	†
Vietnam Veterans Memorial Park	Penn's Landing	2.4	†
Spruce Street Harbor Park	Penn's Landing	0.9	†
Drexel Park	University City	2.5	
Cira Green	University City	1.3	
Columbus Square	Passyunk Square	4.6	†
Wharton Square	South	4.6	†
Stephen Girard Park	Girard Estate	4	
Dickinson Square Park	Pennsport	3	
Jefferson Square	Southwark	3	
Mifflin Square	South	4.6	†
Starr Garden Park	Queen Village	2.2	
Pier 68	Pennsport	0.8	†
Gold Star Park	South	1	†
Capitolo Playground	South	4.1	
Palmer Park	Fishtown	0.9	†
Girard Fountain Park	Old City	0.15	

† Approximate acres based on OpenStreetMap estimates
‡ Philadelphia acres only—majority of the wildlife refuge is located in Delaware County

== Gallery ==
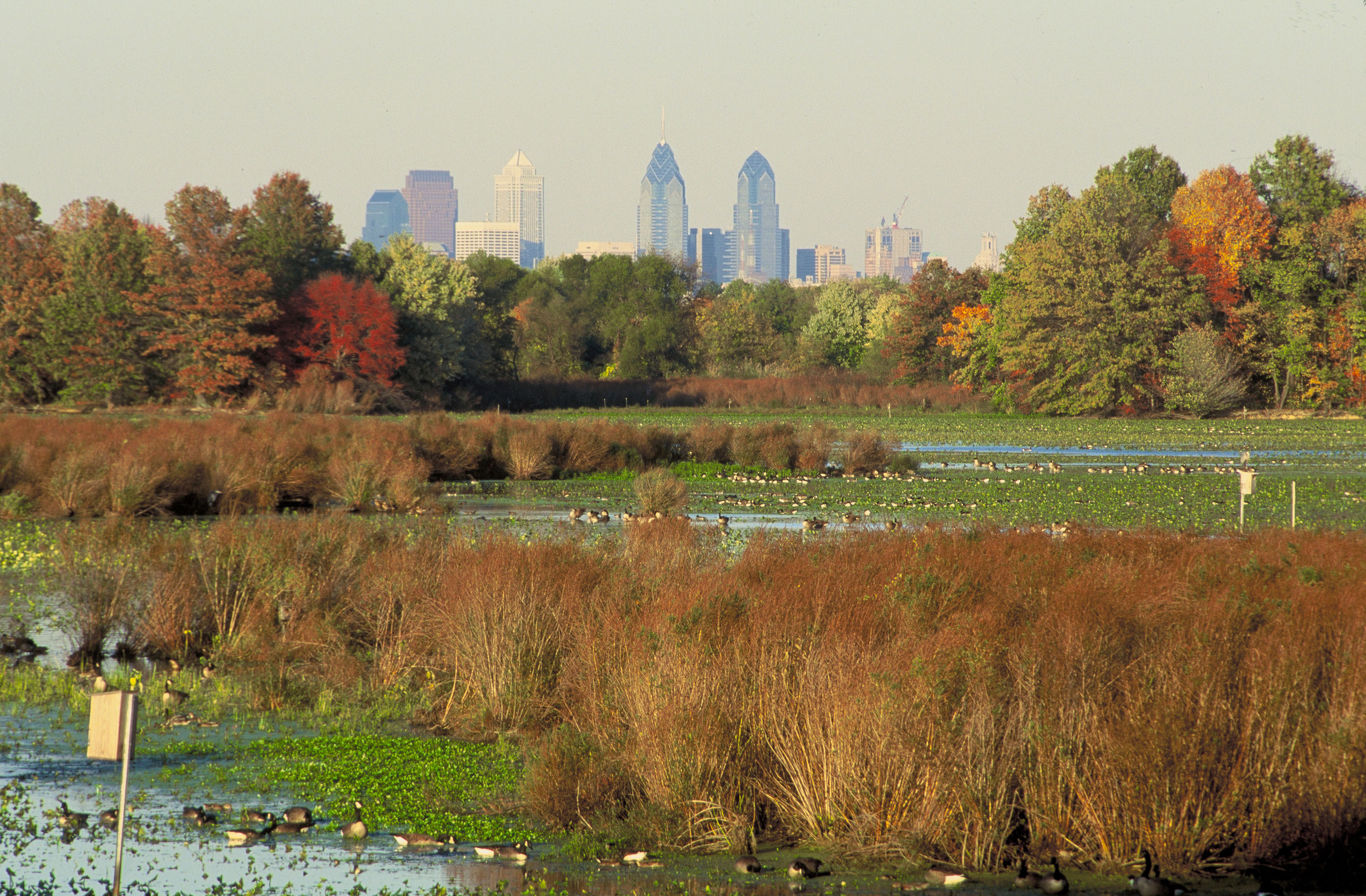
John Heinz NWR at Tinicum

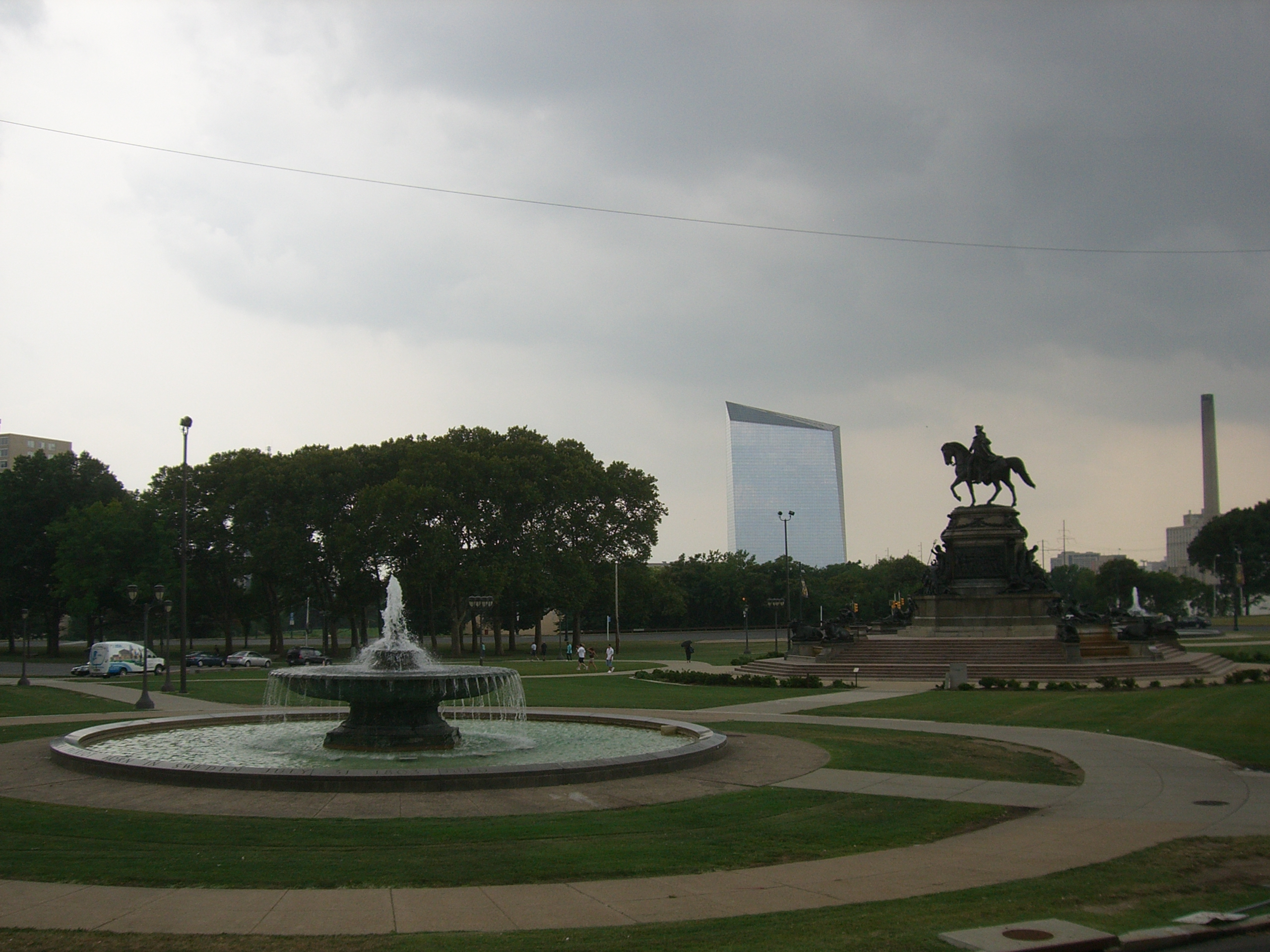
Eakins Oval

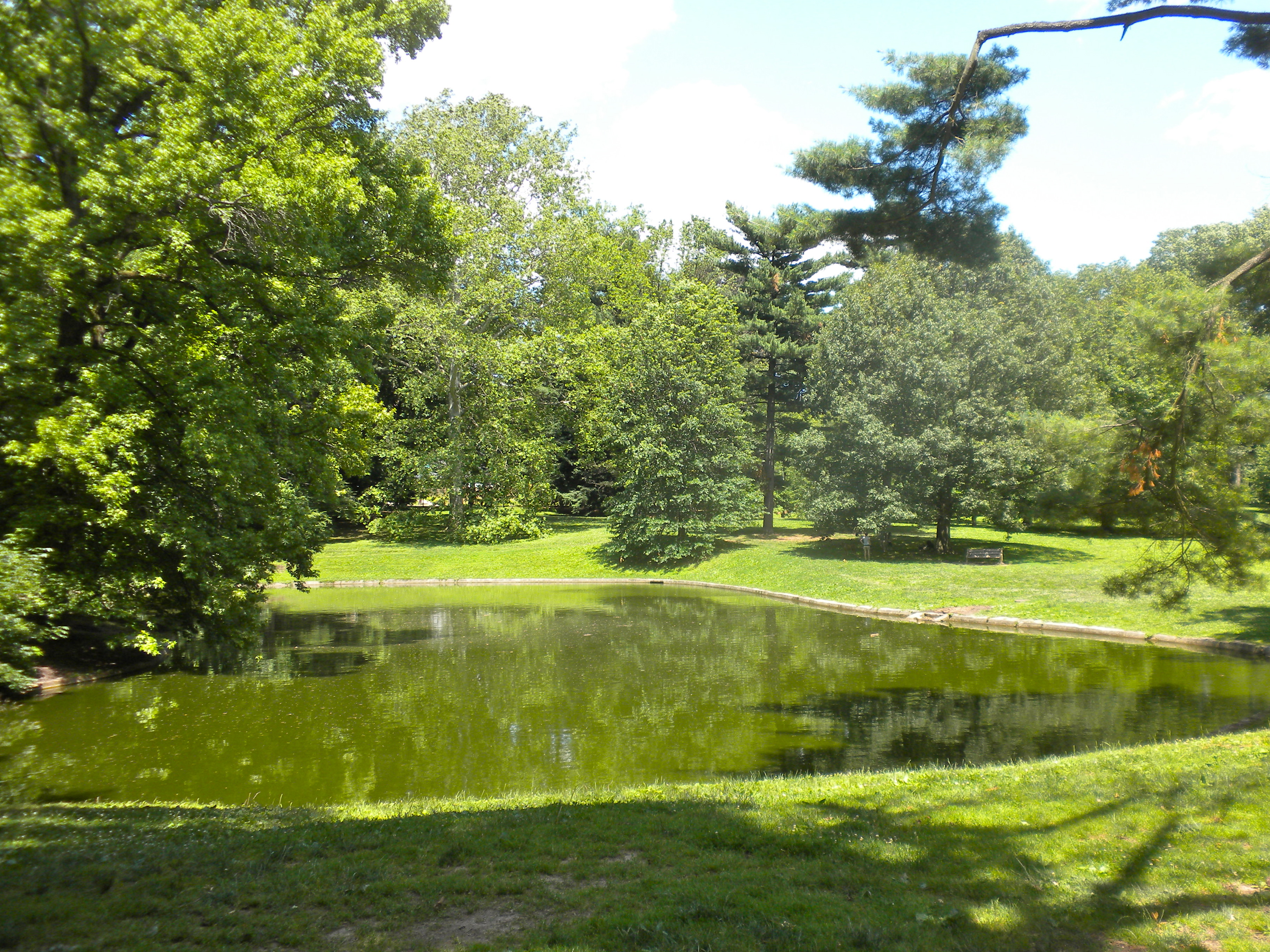
Pastorius Park

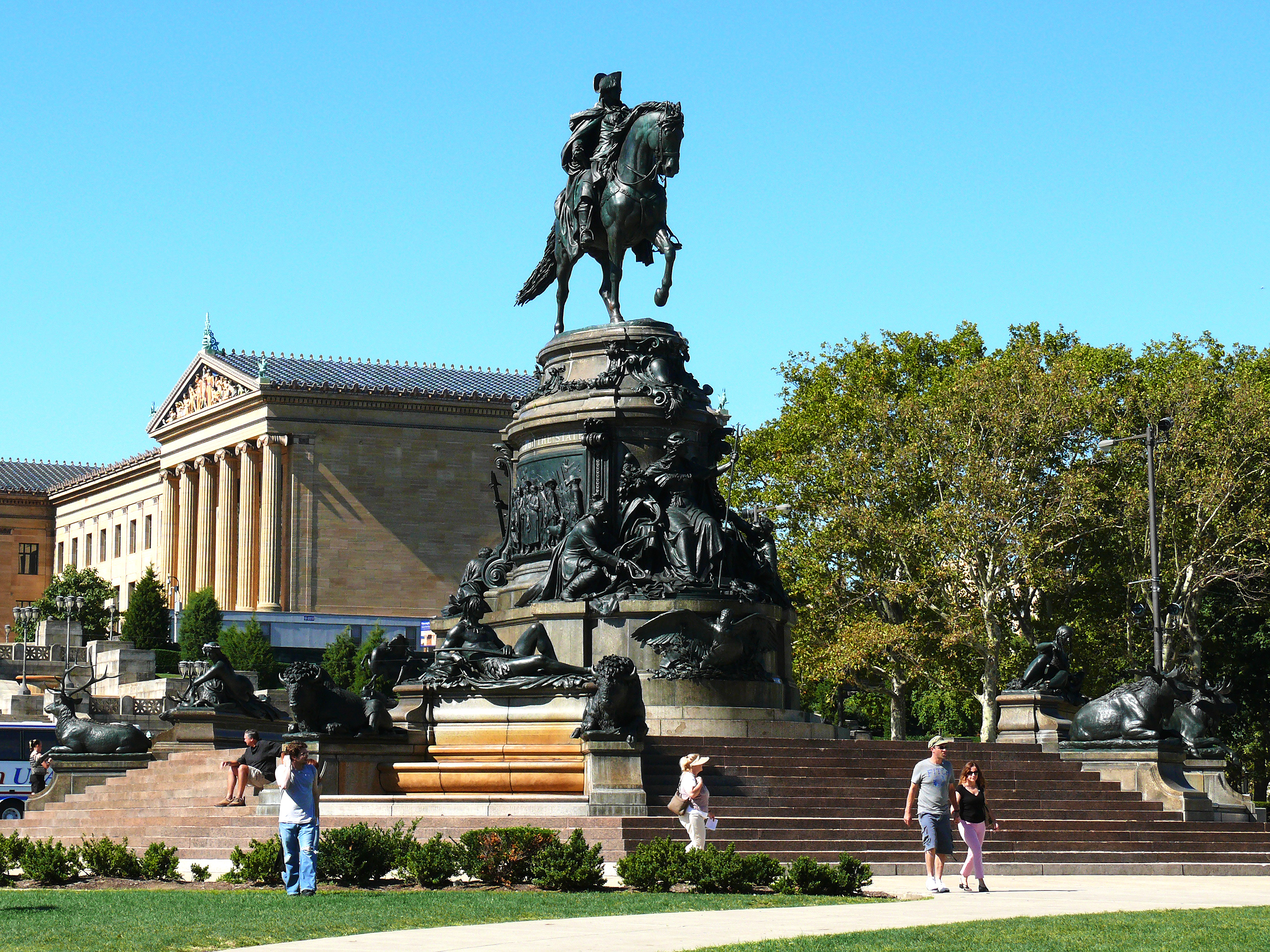
Washington Monument

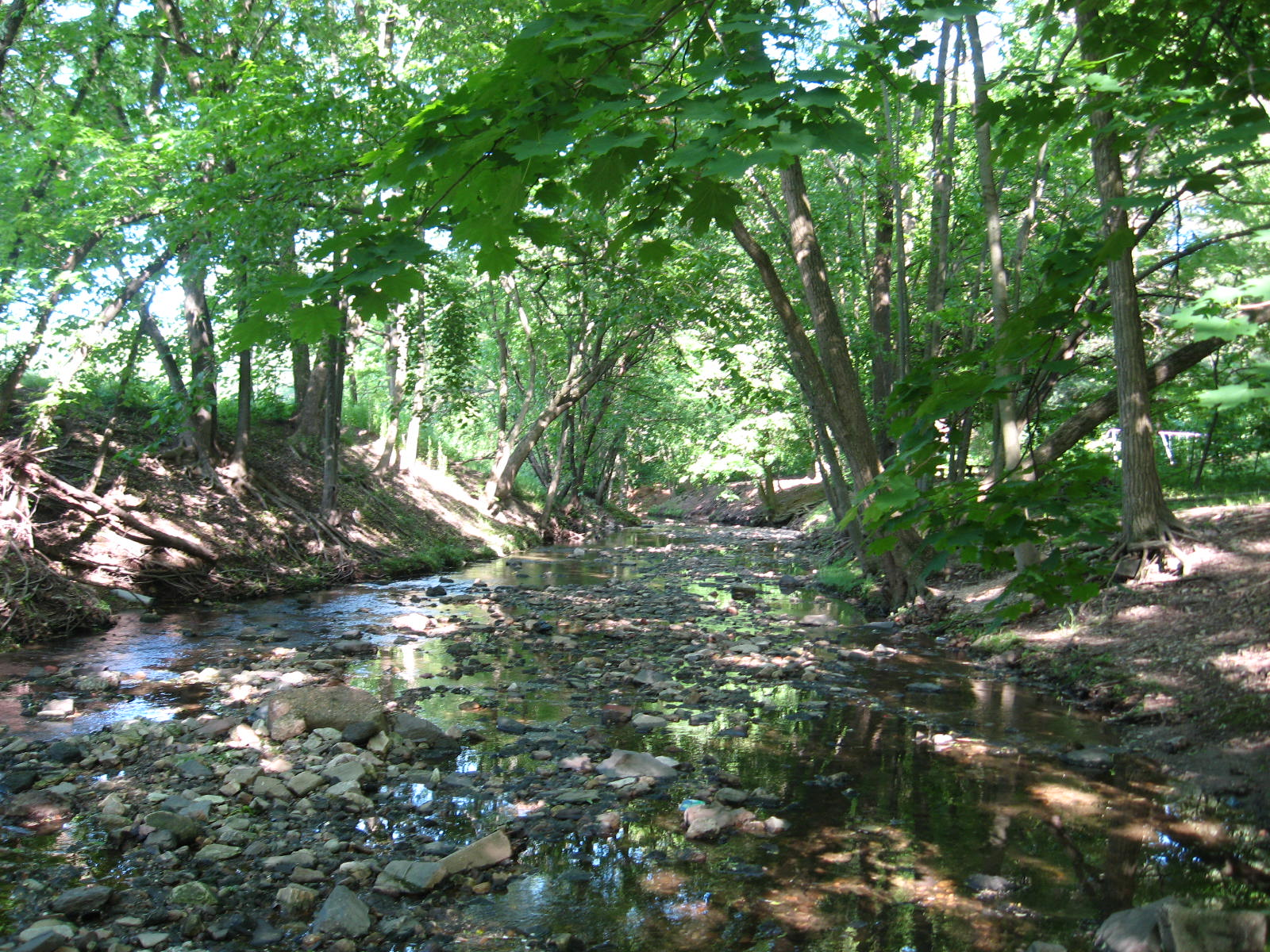
Tookany Creek
