= Philadelphia Parks & Recreation =

Coordinates: 39.9551°N 75.1658°W

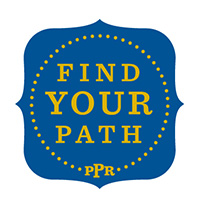
The logo of Philadelphia Parks & Recreation

Philadelphia Parks & Recreation (PPR) is the municipal department responsible for managing parks, recreation centers, playgrounds, trails, community gardens, and historic properties in Philadelphia, Pennsylvania. Its inventory includes more than 150 parks and 170 recreation centers and playgrounds. It became the successor to the Fairmount Park Commission and the City of Philadelphia Department of Recreation in 2010.

== General overview ==
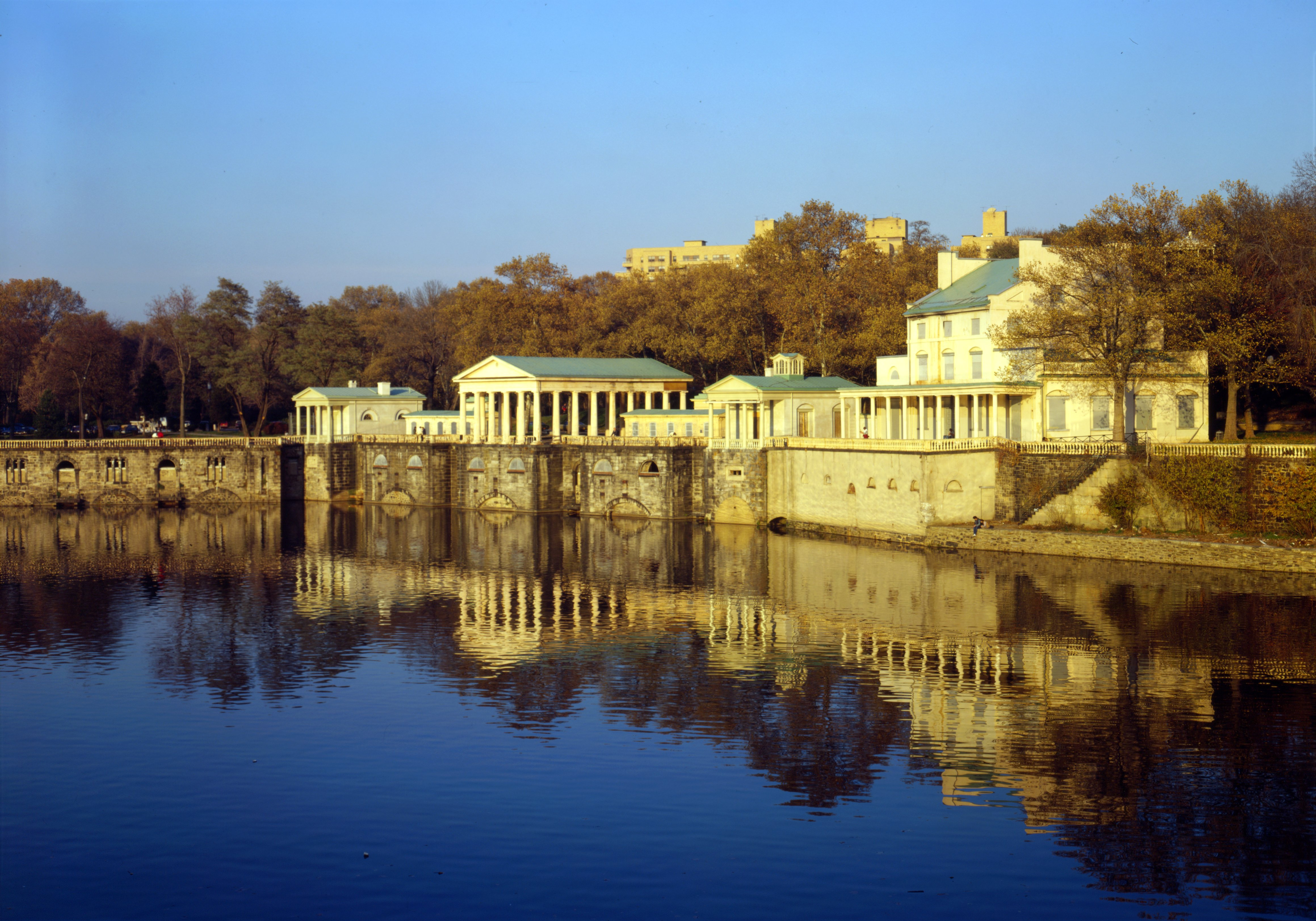
Fairmount Water Works

In addition to overseeing nearly 10,200 acres of land and hundreds of recreation centers, some of the amenities found in the parks and recreation system include 71 outdoor pools, 223 miles of trails, 404 baseball/softball fields, 40 historic sites, 25 public access computing centers, 460 basketball courts and 66 gardens, farms and orchards.

Philadelphia Parks & Recreation also offers approximately 100 After School Programs throughout the city and over 130 summer camps, including neighborhood camps, specialty camps and special needs camps. Other PPR programs focus on urban agriculture, visual and performing arts, environmental education and outdoor recreation, along with sports and athletics opportunities. In addition, PPR operates a food program that feeds approximately 30,000 kids per day in the summer and around 4,000 per day during the school year.

Department services include ecosystem management, historic preservation, event permitting and management, citizen engagement, youth employment, tree services and concessions. Philadelphia Parks & Recreation also organizes signature events and entertainment series like the Mummers Parade, Broad Street Run, The Oval and the Dell Music Center.

== Neighborhood and regional parks ==
Among the department's more than 150 neighborhood and regional parks are:

- Allens Lane
- Awbury Park
- Bartram's Garden
- Benjamin Franklin Parkway
- Bradford Park
- Burholme Park
- Carpenter's Woods
- Carroll Park
- Christ Church Park
- Clark Park
- Clifford Park
- Cloverly Park
- Cobbs Creek Golf Course
- Cobbs Creek Park
- Fairmount Park
- Fernhill Park
- Fisher Park
- Fluehr Park
- Fox Chase Farm
- Franklin D. Roosevelt Golf Course
- Franklin Delano Roosevelt Park
- Franklin Square
- Franklintown Park
- Germany Hill
- Glen Foerd on the Delaware
- Harper's Hollow Park
- Holme Crispin Park
- Hunting Park
- I-95 Park
- Shofuso Japanese House and Garden
- John Byrne Golf Course
- Juniata Golf Course
- Karakung Golf Course
- Kay Park
- Kemble Park
- La Noce Park
- Logan Circle
- Loudoun Park
- Love Park
- Manatawna Farm
- Manayunk Canal
- Marconi Plaza
- Matthias Baldwin Park
- McMichael Park
- Morris Park
- Palmer Park
- Pastorius Park
- Penn Treaty Park
- Pennypack Park
- Poquessing Creek Park
- Rittenhouse Square
- Roosevelt Boulevard
- Schuylkill River Park includes the Schuylkill River Park Community Garden
- Somerton Woods
- Southern Boulevard
- Stephen Girard Park
- Tacony Creek Park
- Wakefield Park
- Walnut Lane Golf Course
- Washington Square
- Wingohockon Park
- Wissahickon Valley Park
- Wister's Woods Park
- Wooden Bridge Run
- Woodward Pines

== See also ==
- List of houses in Fairmount Park
