= Malcolm X (disambiguation) =

Malcolm X (1925–1965) was an African American Muslim minister, public speaker, and human rights activist.

Malcolm X may also refer to:

== Arts and entertainment ==
- Malcolm X (1972 film), a documentary film
- Malcolm X (1992 film), a biographical film starring Denzel Washington as Malcolm X
  - Malcolm X (soundtrack)
- Malcolm X: A Life of Reinvention, a 2011 biography by Manning Marable
- Malcolm X: Make It Plain, a 1994 documentary
- "Malcolm X", a song by Bongi Makeba, performed in 1972
  - recorded in 1974 by Miriam Makeba

== Education ==
- Malcolm X College, a college in Chicago
- Malcolm X Liberation University, an education institute in North Carolina from 1969 to 1973

== Transportation ==
- 110th Street–Malcolm X Plaza station

== See also ==
- Malcolm X. Hamilton, former American footballer
- Malcolm X Boulevard (disambiguation)
- Malcolm X Park (disambiguation)
