= Malcolm X Park (disambiguation) =

Malcolm X Park is an informal name for Meridian Hill Park in the Washington, D.C.

Malcolm X Park may also refer to:

- Malcolm X Park (album), a 1988 album by Unrest
- Malcolm X Park (Philadelphia), Pennsylvania

== See also ==
- Malcolm X (disambiguation)
