= Penn Park =

Public park on the University of Pennsylvania campus

Coordinates: 39.95°N 75.186°W

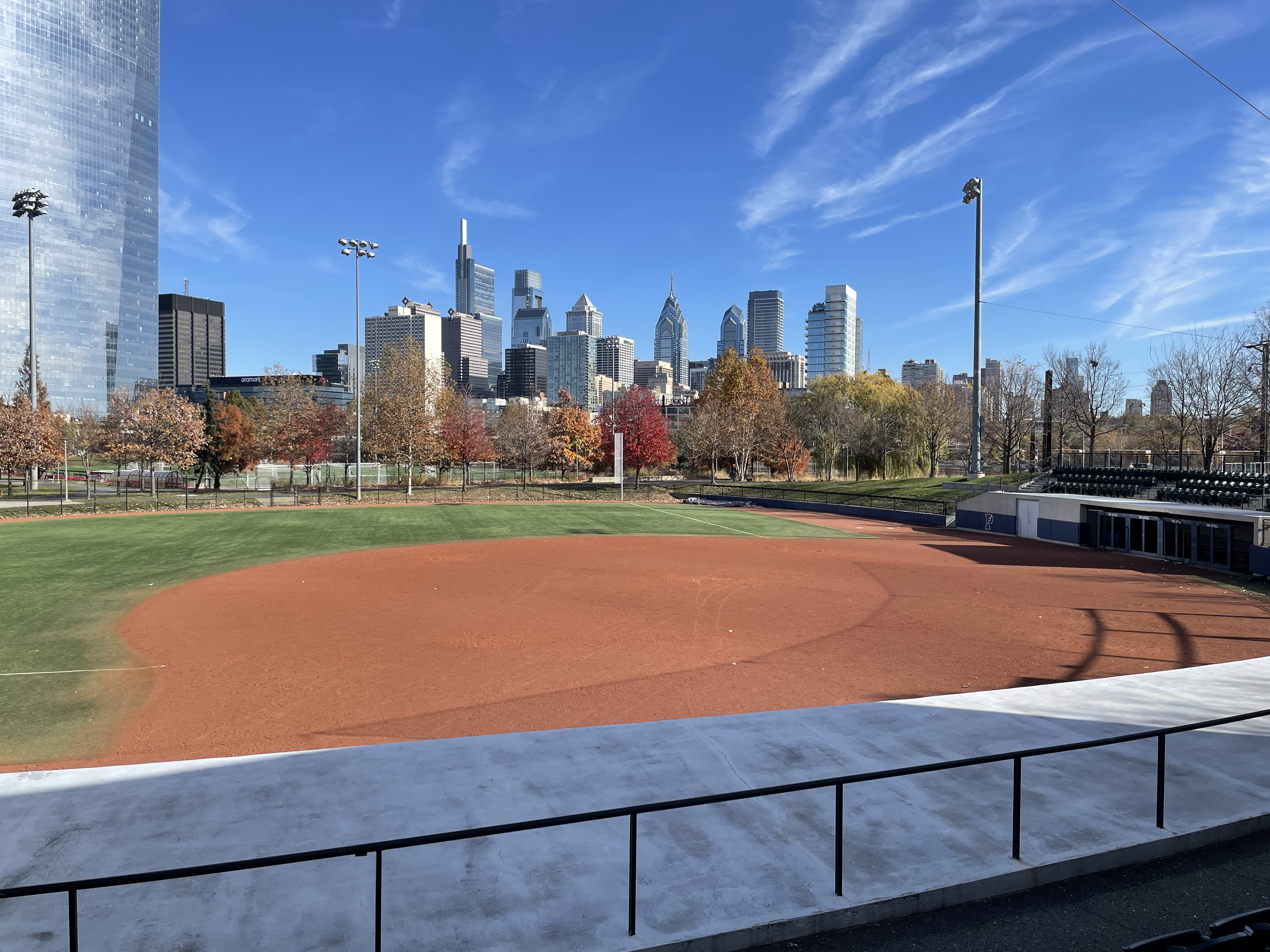
- Interactive map of Penn Park
- Location: West Philadelphia, Pennsylvania
- Area: 24 acres (9.7 ha)
- Opened: 2011
- Owner: University of Pennsylvania
- Website: https://facilities.upenn.edu/maps/locations/penn-park

Penn Park is a 24-acre (97,000 m^{2}) park on the campus of the University of Pennsylvania in Philadelphia, Pennsylvania. The park is at South 31st Street and Walnut Street, and features two athletic fields, a multipurpose stadium with 470 seats, a tennis center, a seasonal air structure, and picnic areas. In Fall 2014, Penn partnered with the Philadelphia Orchard Project to establish the Penn Park Orchard in the southeastern corner of the park.

== History ==
The site was originally home to parking for the USPS (whose main Philadelphia location was immediately to the north before being repurposed by the IRS). The site is also at the level of the train platforms of the former postal complex and 30th Street Station which means that it is nearly 30 ft (9.1 m) below the adjacent streets.

In 2007, Penn purchased the postal complex and entered into agreements that led to the redevelopment of the northern portions of the complex. Funds from the agreement were used to fund part of the $46.5 million cost of the park.

== Description ==
The park is located between Penn's campus and the Schuylkill River. It includes two turf athletic fields, a seasonal athletic sports dome, a softball stadium, a twelve-court tennis complex, and open space and walkways.

Walkways connect the facilities from Franklin Field to Walnut St. SEPTA Regional Rail trains run to the west of the park and Amtrak Northeast Corridor trains run to the east.

== See also ==
- List of parks in Philadelphia
