= F. Amadee Bregy School =

- U.S. National Register of Historic Places
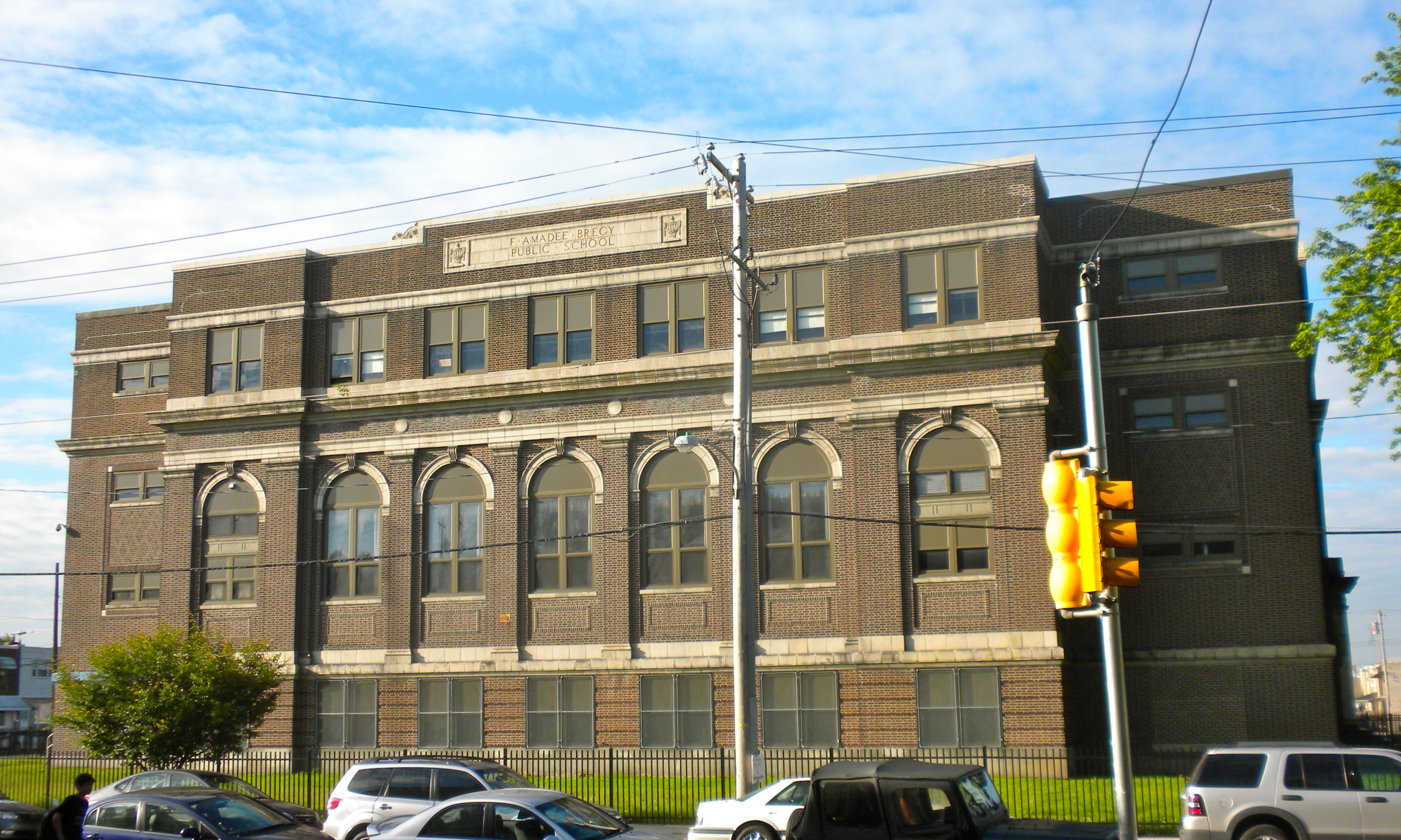
- F. Amadee Bregy School, May 2010

- Location within Philadelphia Location within Pennsylvania Location within the United States
- Location: 1700 Bigler St., Philadelphia, Pennsylvania
- Coordinates: 39°54′53″N 75°10′36″W
- Area: 2 acres (0.81 ha)
- Built: 1923–1924
- Architect: Irwin T. Catharine
- Architectural style: Colonial Revival
- MPS: Philadelphia Public Schools TR
- NRHP reference No.: 88002249
- Added to NRHP: November 18, 1988

F. Amadee Bregy School is a historic school located in the Marconi Plaza neighborhood of Philadelphia, Pennsylvania. It is part of the School District of Philadelphia. The building was designed by Irwin T. Catharine and built in 1923–1924. It is a three-story, nine-bay, brick building on a raised basement in the Colonial Revival-style. It features large stone arched surrounds, double stone cornice, projecting entrance pavilion, and a brick parapet.

It was added to the National Register of Historic Places in 1988.

Its feeder high school is South Philadelphia High School.

In November 2023 a playground, with a cost of $2,100,000, opened. The playground includes a basketball court and a running track. Prior to that point, it had no playground, and students had recess on plain asphalt. When school is not in session, the public may use the playground.
