= Schuylkill River Park =

Park in Philadelphia, Pennsylvania

Coordinates: 39.948749°N 75.181921°W

Schuylkill River Park is a swath of land owned by the Philadelphia Department of Parks and Recreation in Philadelphia, Pennsylvania. It encompasses most of the area bordered by 25th Street and the Schuylkill River (more exactly the CSX Tracks) between Manning and Delancey Streets and the area bordered by the Schuylkill River and 26th Street between Delancey and Pine Streets. Some of this land was held by the Department of Recreation (Tennis Courts, Playground, Basketball Courts, Bike Polo / Street Hockey Area, and Recreation Center) prior to its 2010 merger with the Fairmount Park. In addition, the merged Department of Parks and Recreation owns the land from Taney Street to the Schuylkill River between Pine and the end of Schuylkill Pocket Veterans Memorial Field as well as O'Connor Pool. It also encompasses the Schuylkill River Park Community Garden, which is on land owned by the Department of Parks and Recreation and managed by the Center City Residents' Association. The area connects with the Schuylkill River Trail via a pedestrian bridge, which was completed in October 2012.

== Friends of Schuylkill River Park ==
The Friends of Schuylkill River Park is a 501(c)(3) non-profit organization that works to improve Schuylkill River Park, the Markward Recreation Center and Taney Field. Past accomplishments include a complete renovation of Markward Playground, planting many new trees, helping to coordinate the renovation of 25th and Delancey, refurbishing Park Benches, and many others.

== See also ==
- List of parks in Philadelphia
