= Statue of Christopher Columbus (Philadelphia) =

Statue in Philadelphia, Pennsylvania, U.S.

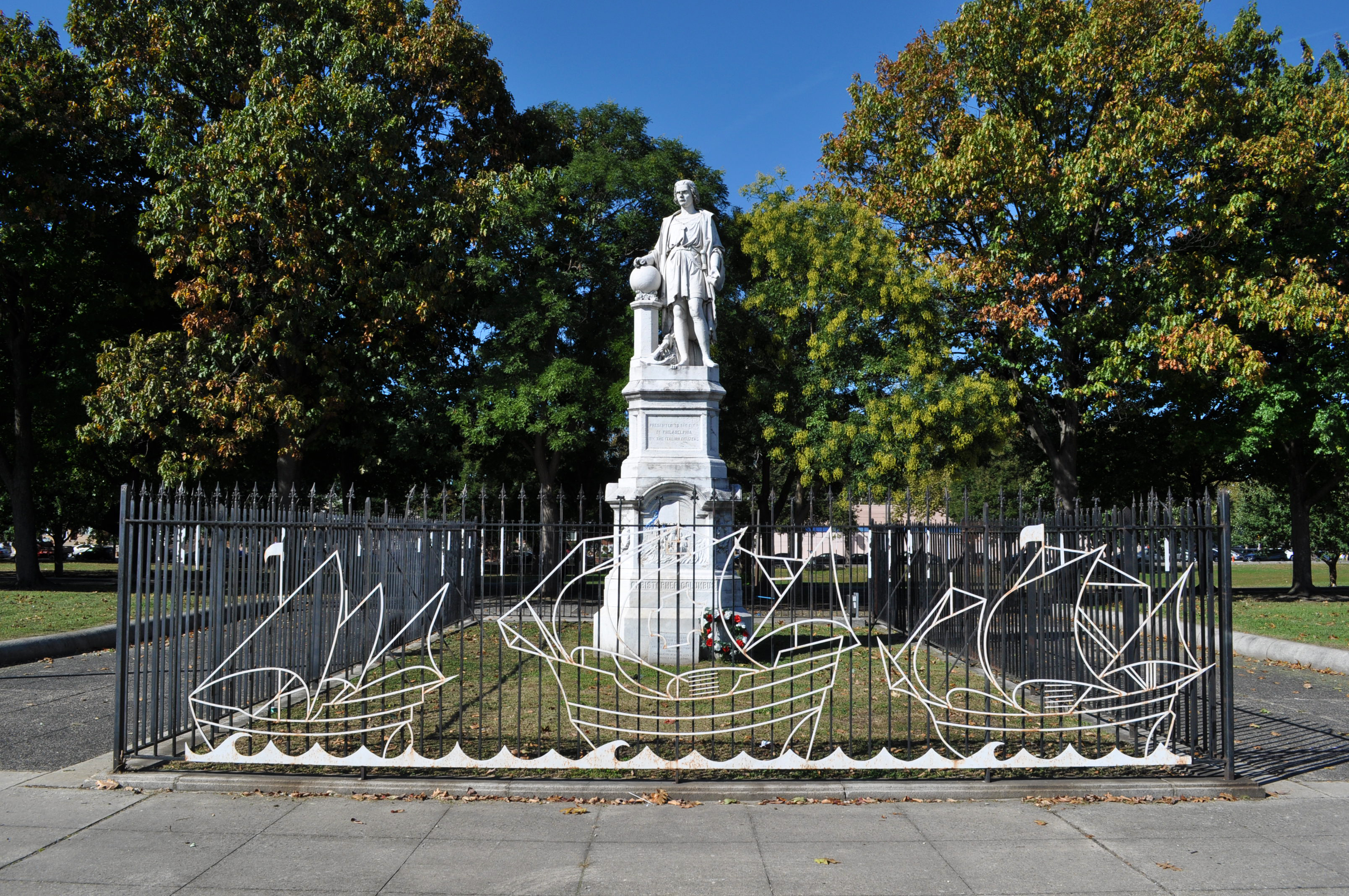
- Christopher Columbus Monument and Railing Sculpture of Niña, Pinta, and Santa Maria in Marconi Plaza
- Subject: Christopher Columbus
- Location: Philadelphia, Pennsylvania, U.S.; 39.915563°N 75.172088°W

An 1876 statue of Christopher Columbus by Emanuele Caroni is installed in Marconi Plaza, 2848 South Broad Street, Philadelphia, Pennsylvania (United States), inside a railing that bears wire art of Columbus's three ships, the Niña, Pinta, and Santa Maria.

== Description and history ==
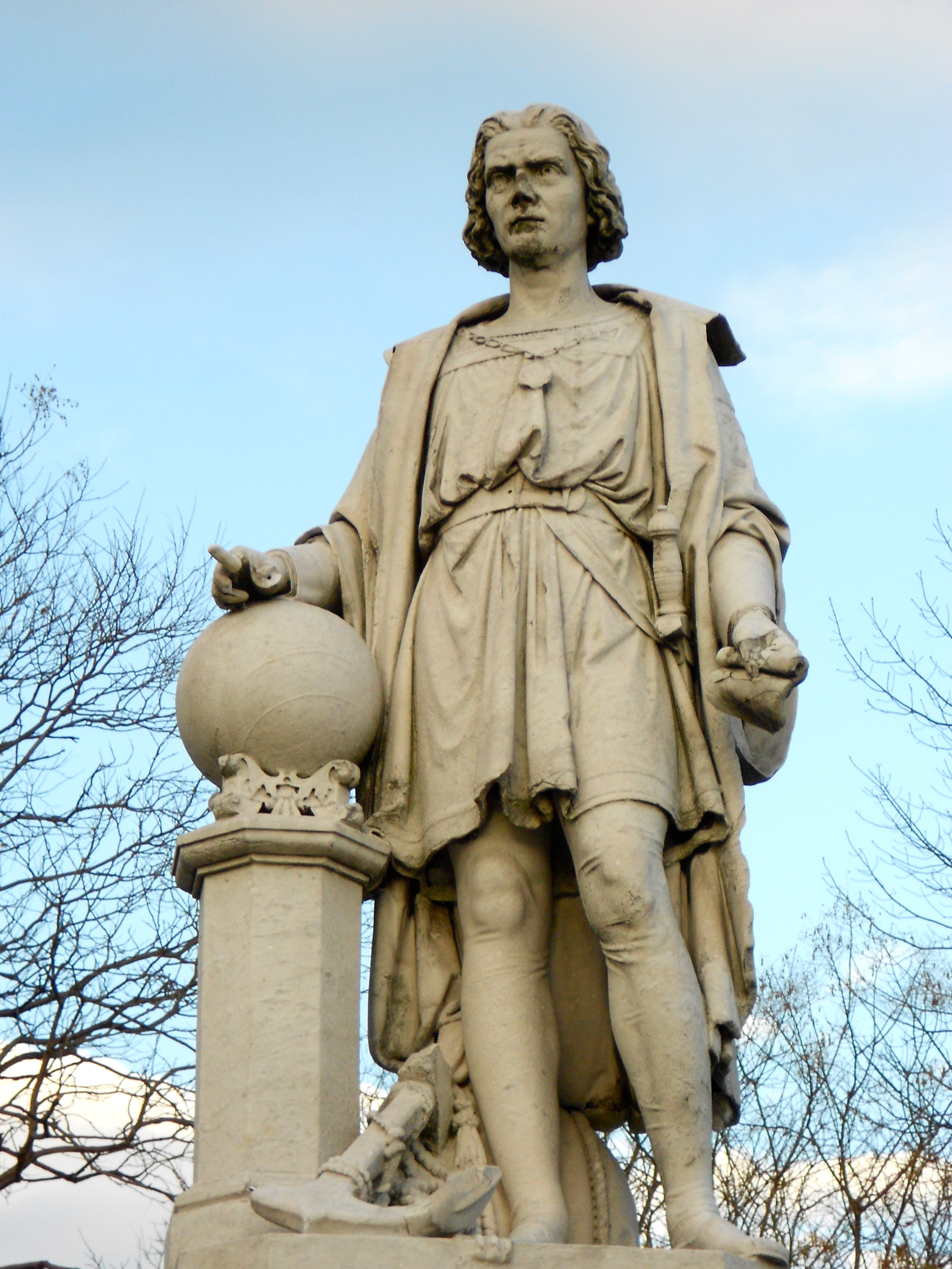
Statue in December 2012

The Christopher Columbus Monument was originally erected on the Centennial Exposition grounds at the intersection of Fountain and Belmont Avenues, near the Conservatory and dedicated on October 13, 1876 as a tribute from Italy to America. The entire monument cost $18,000, was made of Italian Ravazzoni marble, and stands 22 ft (6.7 m) from the ground, the statue of Columbus being 10 ft (3.0 m) in height and the pedestal 12 ft (3.7 m). The base is 7 ft (2.1 m) long by 6 ft (1.8 m) in width, and the weight is about 70,000 lb (32,000 kg). The figure represents Columbus, in the costume of his age and clime, standing on a ship's deck, near his feet being an anchor, coils of rope, and a sailor's dunnage bag; his right hand resting on a globe, 15 in (380 mm) in diameter, with the New World outlined on the front face, and supported by a hexagonal column. His left is gracefully extended and holds a chart of what was once an unknown sea. The head of the statue is bare, and the physiognomy about as represented in the bust of the navigator at Genoa. On the front cap of the pedestal are the words "Presented to the city of Philadelphia by the Italian Societies". Beneath this is a medallion representing the landing of Columbus. On the opposite side of the cap is inscribed "Dedicated October 13, 1886, by the Christopher Columbus Monument Association, on the Anniversary of the Landing of Columbus, October 13, 1482". Underneath is the Genoese coat of arms and the words "In commemoration of the First Century of American Independence". On the remaining two sides of the pedestal are the coats of arms of Italy and the United States.

Antonio Isoleri, the second pastor of the first Italian church in the United States and the prototype for all Italian parishes in Philadelphia that came afterward, St. Mary Magdalen dePazzi, organized for the erection of this statue of Christopher Columbus, the first in Philadelphia, in Fairmount Park, and for a celebration. Isoleri, calling for unity among Italians in America utilized the explorer to provide people that were divided by their various regional ethnicities with a hero from a common heritage that generated shared pride.

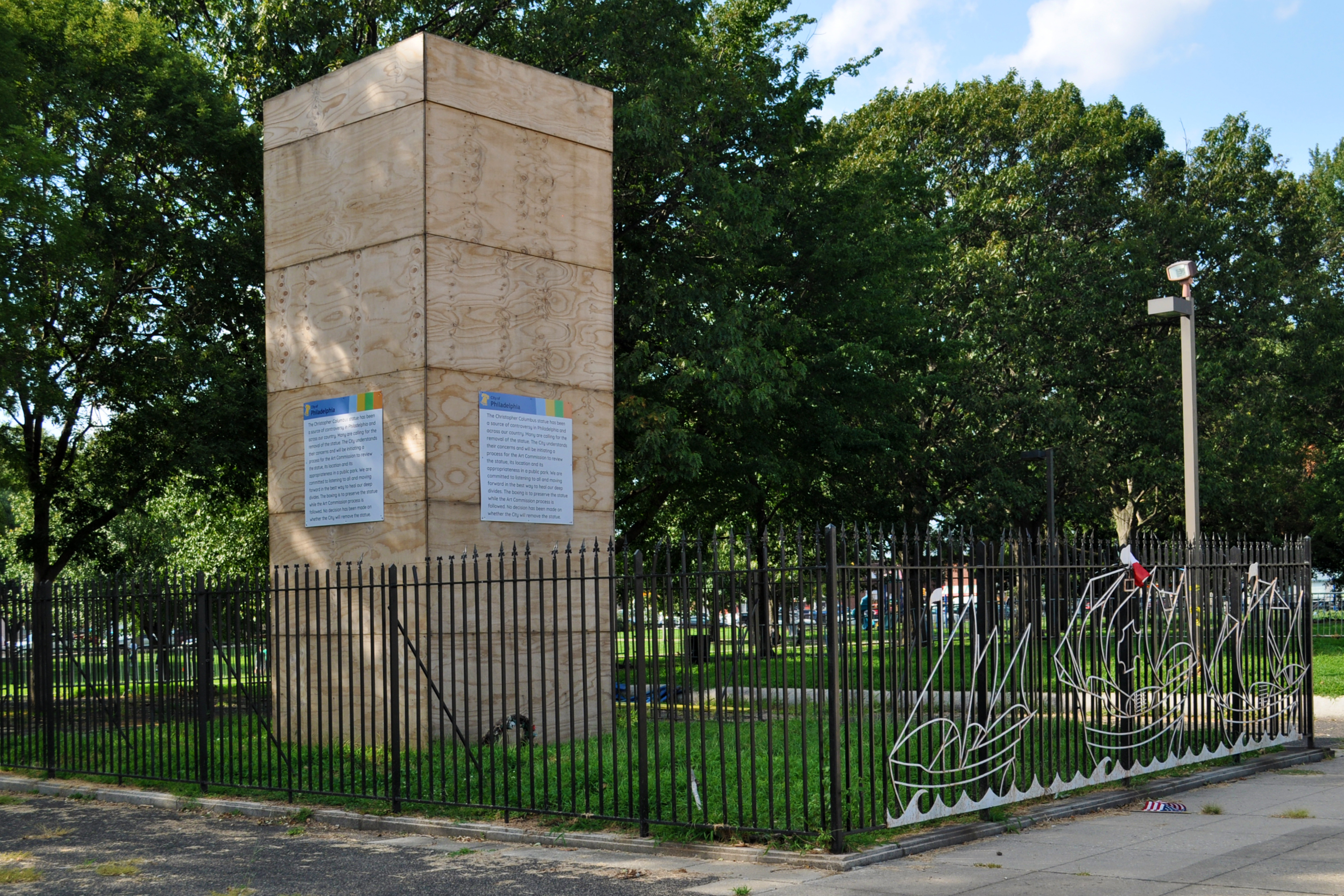
Boxed statue of Christopher Columbus (Philadelphia, June 2020)

On August 12, 2020, the Philadelphia Art Commission issued an order to remove the statue from Marconi Plaza and to place it in temporary storage. This followed an endorsement of a city proposal, two weeks prior, by the Philadelphia Historical Commission, to remove the statue, citing public safety and susceptibility of damage to the statue as a result of the George Floyd protests. A judge later halted the order, while a legal battle continues in the courts. Citing preservation of the statue pending a final decision, the City of Philadelphia had it boxed. On August 17, 2021 a judge from Philadelphia Common Pleas Court ruled the decision for removing the statue to be without legal merit, and on December 9, 2022, a ruling by the Pennsylvania Commonwealth Court ordered the plywood box enclosure to be removed.

== See also ==
- List of monuments and memorials to Christopher Columbus
