= Pastorius Park =

Park in Philadelphia, Pennsylvania, United States

Coordinates: 40°04′16″N 75°12′18″W

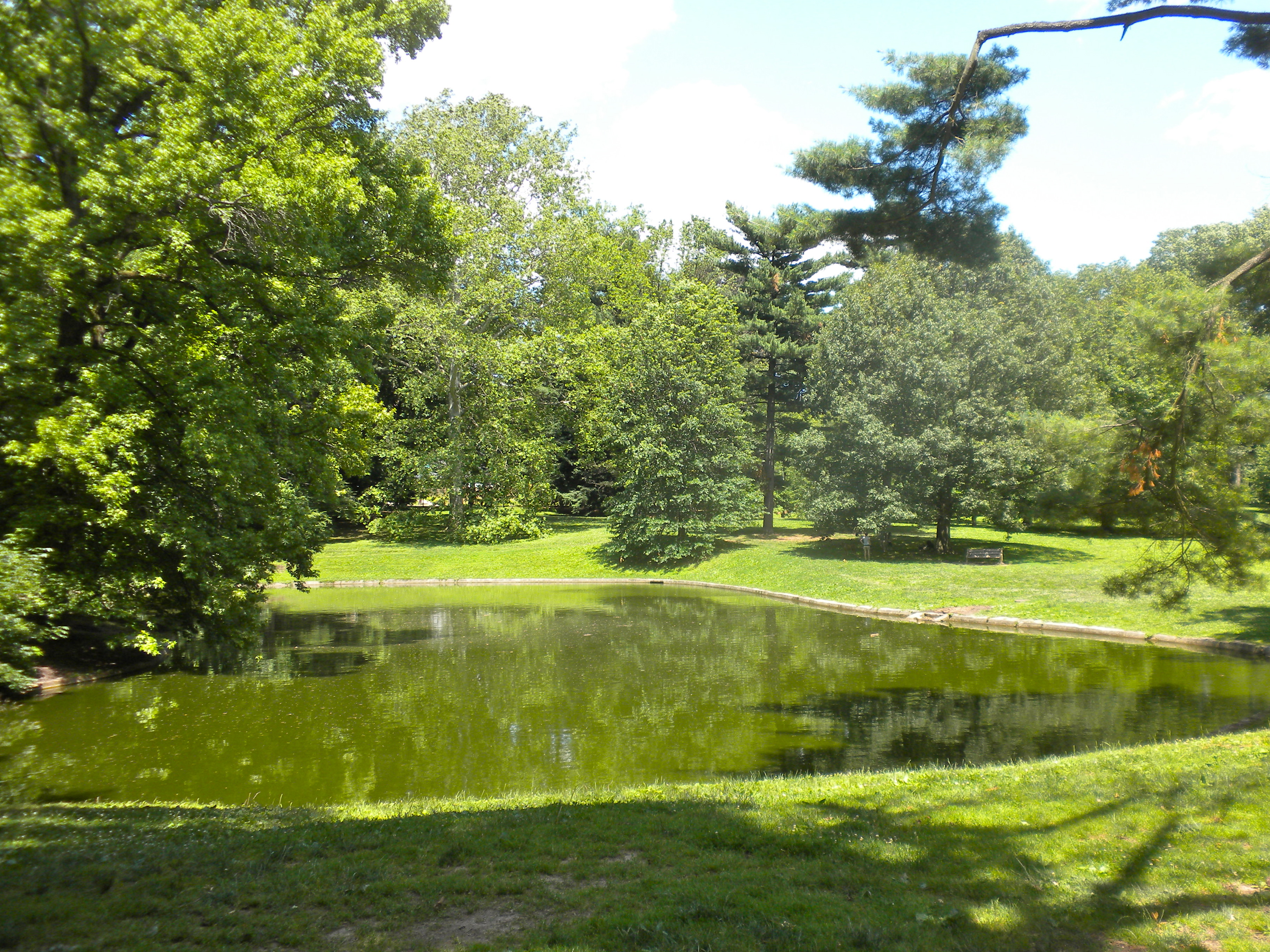
Pond in Pastorius Park

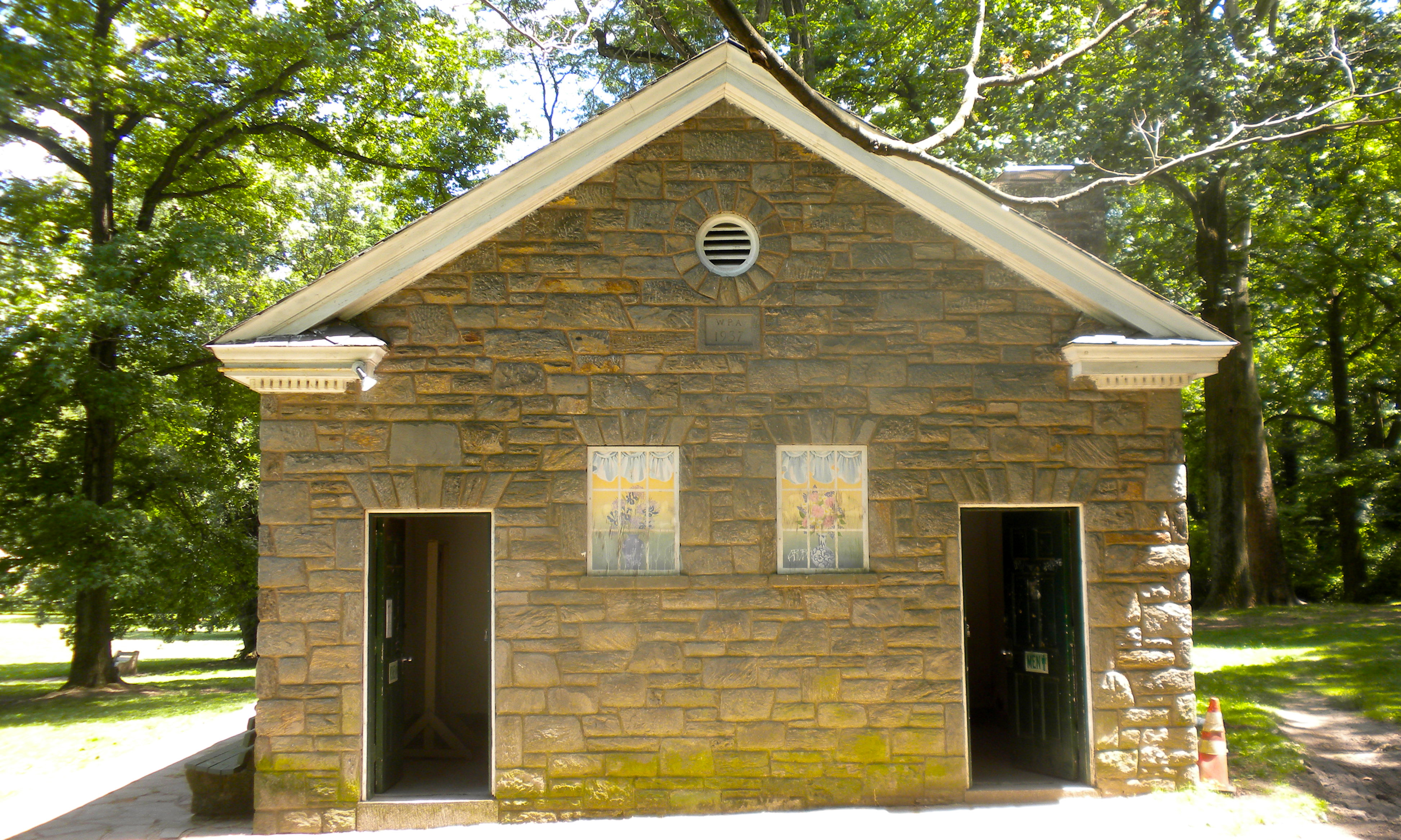
Works Progress Administration building in the park, built 1937

Pastorius Park is a sixteen-acre (6.5-ha) park that is located in Philadelphia, Pennsylvania, United States. It is maintained by Friends of Pastorius Park and the Fairmount Park Commission.

== History and notable features ==
Established in 1915, this American park was named in honor of Francis Pastorius, a leader of early German immigrants to the area. It is located in the Chestnut Hill section of Philadelphia, at Lincoln Drive and Abington Avenue.

Its current design was the 1935 work of landscape architect Frederick W.G. Peck (1909–1998).

This park includes a pond and an amphitheater.

The Chestnut Hill Community Association sponsors evening concerts at the park during the summer.

== Arboretum Designation ==
In 2024 the Friends of Pastorius Park worked to have the park designated as a Level 1 ArbNet accredited arboretum. This achievement marks a significant milestone in Friends of Pastorius Park's commitment to environmental stewardship and preservation at Pastorius Park. The Park is also now recognized as an accredited arboretum in the Morton Register of Arboreta, a database of the world's arboreta and gardens dedicated to woody plants. As part of its designation, more than 200 trees and shrubs in the park have been tagged with the name, cultivar, and planting date.

== See also ==
- List of parks in Philadelphia
- Friends of Pastorius Park
