= Marconi Plaza =

Urban park square in Philadelphia

Coordinates: 39.91559°N 75.17135°W

- Interactive map of Marconi Plaza
- Type: Urban park
- Location: Philadelphia, Pennsylvania
- Area: 19 acres (7.7 ha)
- Created: 1914
- Operator: City Parks & Recreation
- Visitors: 150,000
- Status: Open all year
- Public transit: Oregon Station

Marconi Plaza is an urban park square located in South Philadelphia, Philadelphia, Pennsylvania, United States. The plaza was named to recognize the 20th-century cultural identity in Philadelphia of the surrounding Italian American enclave neighborhood and became the designation location of the annual Columbus Day Parade.

Marconi Plaza has two main halves, east and west, which are divided in the middle by Broad Street. It is located at the most southern end of the city and within the northern border of the Sports Complex Special Services District and the southern border of Lower Moyamensing. The park plaza is accessible via the Oregon Avenue station of the Broad Street subway.

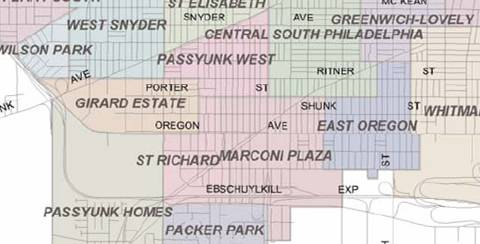

Boundaries of the Marconi Plaza neighborhood:

Western half	Eastern half
Broad Street to 20th St. from Oregon Avenue to Packer Avenue including Moyamensing Blvd	Broad Street to 8th St. from Oregon Avenue to Packer Avenue

The urban park plaza itself, from which the neighborhood derives its name (Marconi East and "Marco" Marconi West), is a 19-acre (77,000 m^{2}) rectangular park. The Roman-styled plaza is divided in the center by Broad Street and is bordered by 13th Street, 15th Street, Bigler Street, and Oregon Avenue.

== History ==
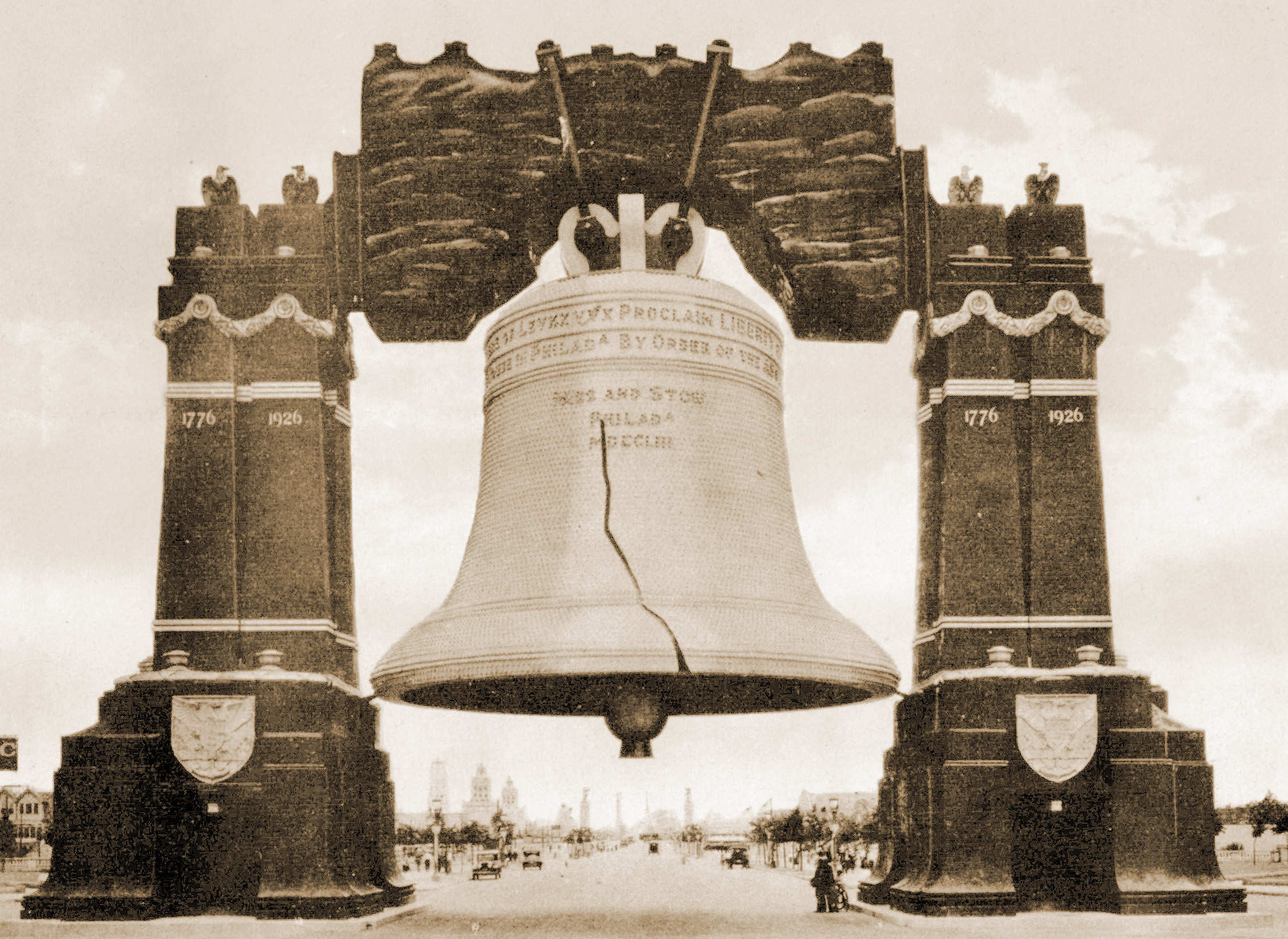
Grand pre-entrance for the 1926 Sesquicentennial Exposition -demolished 1927

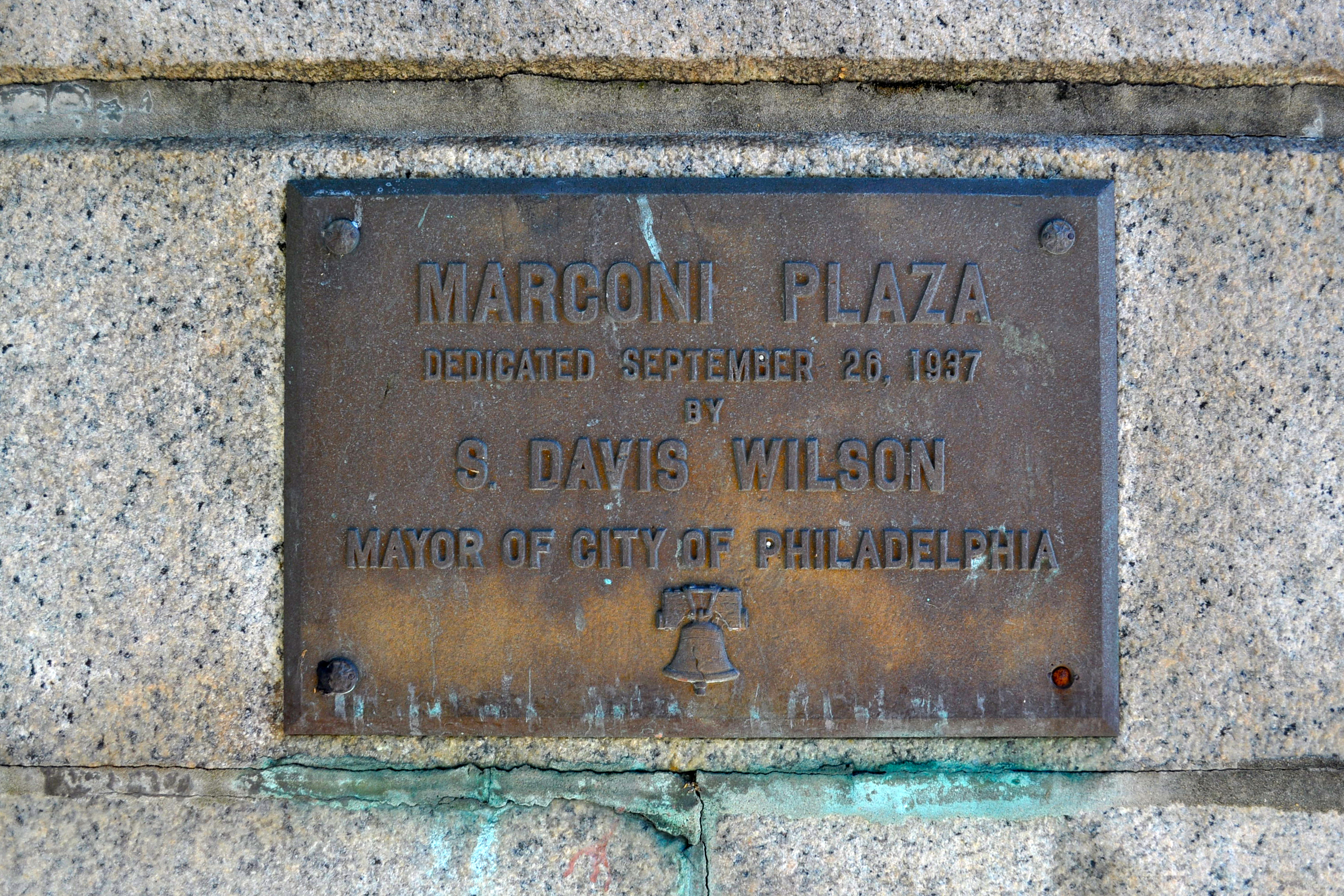
1937 Dedication Plaque

The plaza design is credited to the strong influence of renowned architect Paul Philippe Cret in 1904 as part of his participation in the Art Jury reviewing the preliminary plans presented by landscape architects the Olmsted Brothers, who were then charged with a modified design to complete the work. . The Plaza later served as the grand pre-entrance for the 1926 Sesquicentennial Exposition, leading visitors south along a tree lined Southern Boulevard Parkway (landscaped segment of South Broad Street) to the exhibition grounds that started at Packer Avenue and continued to League Island Park. This neighborhood twin park is mirrored on both sides of Broad Street and became property of the Fairmount Park system. It held the common name of Oregon Plaza until October 18, 1937 when it was officially named Marconi Plaza in honor of the Nobel Prize Laureate Guglielmo Marconi, the inventor of radio.

The F. Amadee Bregy School was added to the National Register of Historic Places in 1988.

== Architecture ==
The original design of the Plaza was a two level terrace with pathways, marble trims, urns, influenced by landscaped architecture modeling after Roman gardens and English gardens. The east and west plaza reflected the same winding pathways, leading to a raised stepped terrace surrounded by stone railings and entrance sculptures of large urns, with two small "reflecting" pools of water facing Broad Street at the center point, which at that time was cut away from the curbline, forming half circles open to traffic on both the east and west. This accent was used in 1926 to position a large Liberty Bell at the center of the street, permitting traffic to circle around.

Over the years, many of the fine details have been erased, including the half circled indented curbline on either side of Broad Street at the center. This location also had, on both sides of the plaza, two reflecting pools of water. The pools were filled in to provide the foundation for the two statues that were later erected to support the cultural history of the immigrant Italian community and respond to Anti-Italianism.

The park is currently lushly covered with 25% trees adorned with park benches, open areas for two tot lots, a baseball field, basketball court, and country cottage style enclosed bocce court. The sidewalk border surrounding the park is densely lined with large maple trees with heights of 30–50 feet high.

== Public art ==
Bronze statue of Guglielmo Marconi, sculpted by Saleppichi Giancarlo, erected on the east plaza in 1975

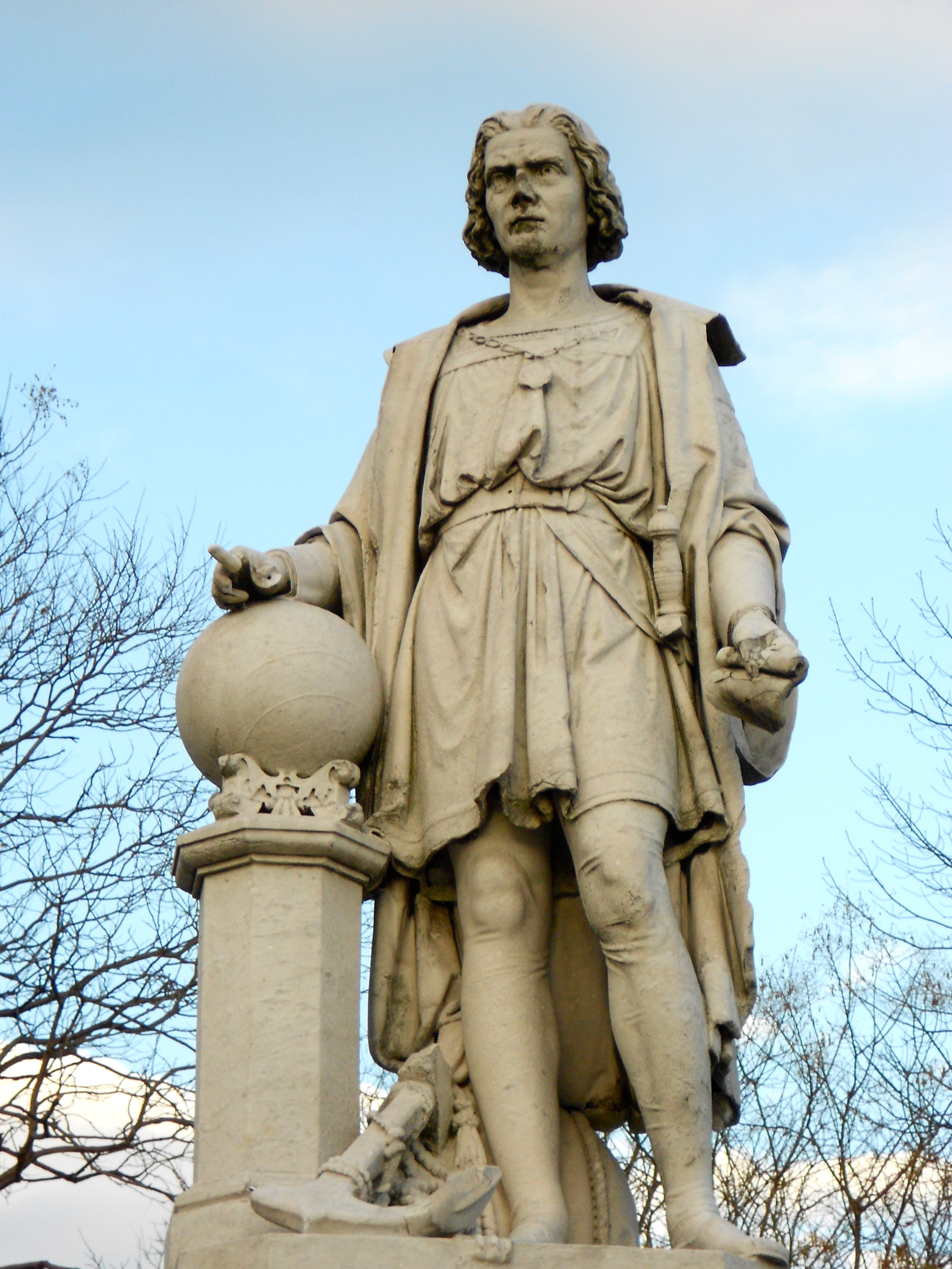
Marble Statue of Christopher Columbus sculpted by Emanuele Caroni, erected October 12, 1876. Relocated 1982 to the west Plaza

Bronze statue of Guglielmo Marconi, sculpted by Saleppichi Giancarlo, was erected on the east plaza in 1975 though the efforts of the Italo-American Community organized as the "Marconi Memorial Association" headed by Dr. Frank P. DiDio. The statue was dedicated on April 25, 1980, to commemorate the 106th anniversary of the birthday of the world-famous Italian scientist and inventor.

Marble statue of Christopher Columbus was erected on the west plaza in 1976. This work was originally located along Belmont Avenue in Fairmount Park, having been unveiled on October 12, 1876, for Philadelphia's Centennial Exposition. Thought to be the work of Emanuele Caroni, this is said to be first publicly funded monument to Christopher Columbus in the United States. It was purchased for $18,000 with money raised by Italian-Americans and the Columbus Monument Association, through the efforts of Alonzo Viti of Philadelphia and his brothers. The statue's initial installation began an annual tradition for the colony of mostly Italian Americans in South Philadelphia to march each year on Columbus Day to the statue in Fairmount Park. The 6-mile (9.7 km) journey was found to be too exhausting and in 1920 the celebration changed locations.

Controversy surrounding Christopher Columbus statue

- 2018

The words "Italian-Americans against racism" were painted on the pavement in front of the statue as part of a series of protest events on Columbus Day.

- 2020

During the aftermath of the George Floyd protests and greater Black Lives Matter (BLM) movement in June, statues depicting Christopher Columbus as well as other historical figures had become a target for vandalism and city sanctioned removal nationwide. Some members of the Italian-American community of South Philadelphia assembled in Marconi Plaza, believing that the Italian immigrant-created Columbus statue would be destroyed; some of them were armed with weapons and surrounded the statue. However, in the wake of the George Floyd protests, outsider far-right counterprotesters who were not from the neighborhood began to show up. Jim Kenney released a statement on twitter;@PhillyMayor (June 14, 2020). "We are aware of the groups of armed individuals protecting the Columbus statue in Marconi Plaza. All vigilantism is inappropriate, and these individuals only bring more danger to themselves and the city" (Tweet) – via Twitter. city officials have since declared that the statue will remain on site for the time being and on June 17 city workers boarded it up with a wooden box to protect it. On June 15 conservative WPHT radio talk show host Dom Giordano interviewed a South Philadelphia resident who defended the statue in a segment called "The 'Gravy Seals' Speak Out". When questioned as to why the man would defend the statue, he is quoted as saying "...it's more than just a statue, that statue was donated from the community and was paid for by the community. So it represents Italian heritage, even though the history may be blemished on Columbus himself. It's still recognized as an Italian heritage symbol, so we feel like we're being attacked. Because you know - they took down Rizzo, they took down the mural, now they're gonna take down this and they're probably going to stop the parade..." On June 23 a second wave of violence broke out in the otherwise quiet Marconi plaza, when a group of around 50 protesters met a group of around 100 counter-protesters. The latter group was heard chanting "U.S.A" before a brawl ensued and a man from each side was detained. On June 24 it was announced the city would request permission from the Philadelphia Art Commission to remove the statue, with public feedback collected online and an official hearing set for July 22. On August 12, the Philadelphia Art Commission issued an order to remove the statue from Marconi Plaza and to place it in temporary storage. This followed an endorsement of a city proposal, two weeks prior, by the Philadelphia Historical Commission, to remove the statue, citing public safety and susceptibility of damage to the statue as a result of the George Floyd protests.

== Marconi East: Residential ==
Mollbore Terraces of Marconi: The 1930s Mollbore Terrace was a unique urban change from the densely lined row houses that characterized most of South Philadelphia. The design included front porches and a rear yard with an access service roadway for trash pick-up. Three separate Mollbore Terrace sections were constructed east of the plaza within the boundaries of 13th Street to 7th Street, and from Oregon Ave to Johnston Street. The layout departed from the standard street grid, offsetting the numbered streets that permitted placing a "mini-public-square" of green space for houses to face inward on all four sides and directions. The center large rectangular common parks space was originally designated as a "Terrace" that included pathways, grass and trees with an octagon-shaped wading pool at the west end and a raised octagon sand pit platform with a flag pole at the east end.

== Marconi West: Residential ==
Roman Terraces of Marconi: The Greco-Roman–accented homes west of the plaza from 15th to 19th street, using the same concept but on a smaller scale, include two oval-shaped terrace streets at Smedley and Colorado. The terrace at Colorado Street became well known citywide for its annual decorations and street lighting during the Christmas holidays from 1950 to 2000.

Moyamensing Avenue Parkway of Marconi: This main angular dual street with an approximately 50-foot center median landscaped area and tree-lined street, crosses the standard street grid and was designed as an alternative roadway access to the 1926 Sesquicentennial Exposition. It begins at Oregon Avenue, that once was a headhouse entrance for the 1926 Expo, through to the intersection of 20th Street, Penrose Avenue and Packer Avenue. An architectural design for a grand public square like the squares of Center City Philadelphia (inspired by the Benjamin Franklin Parkway) was planned at the parkway's end point of Penrose Avenue, which was viewed by city planners to be the significant southern gateway to the City. The 1926 square was never developed.

== Boundaries ==

In 2002, the City of Philadelphia legislated boundaries of the Sports Complex Special Service District. The residential communities defined included Marconi Plaza. The Special District established an overlay providing the basis for a new definition to Marconi East as community 3 and Marconi West as community 4.

== See also ==
- List of parks in Philadelphia
