= Malcolm X Park (Philadelphia) =

Park in Philadelphia

Coordinates: 39°57′10″N 75°13′31″W

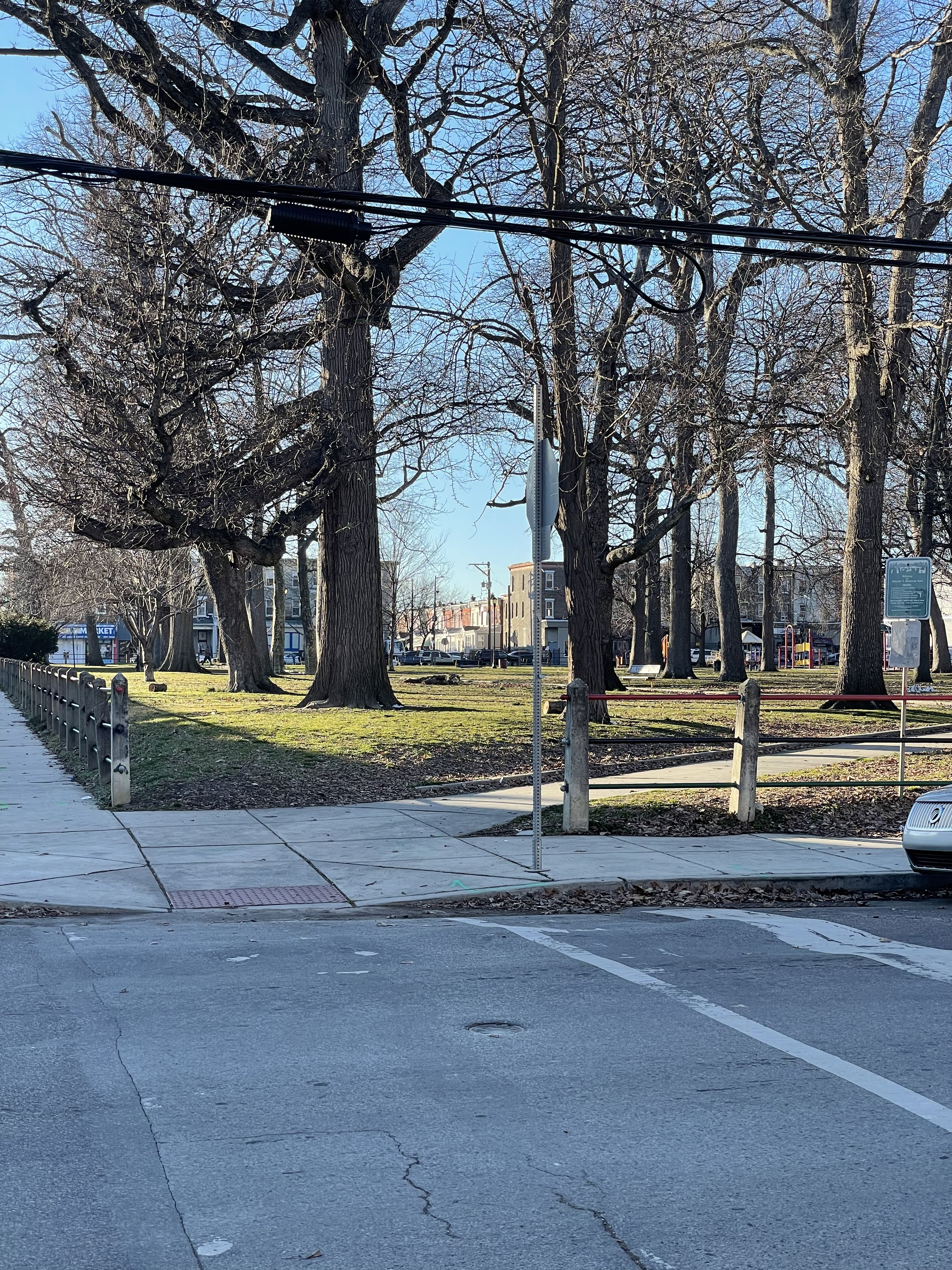
- A view of the park from 51st St. & Larchwood Ave.
- Interactive map of Malcolm X Park
- Type: Urban park
- Location: Philadelphia, Pennsylvania
- Area: 6 acres (2.4 ha)
- Operator: Friends of Malcolm X Park
- Open: All year

Malcolm X Park (formerly named Black Oak Park) is an urban park in West Philadelphia named in honor of Malcolm X. It is a six-acre park located around 51st Street and Pine Street. The park is known for its jazz festival during the summer.

== History ==
Black Oak Park was founded in 1903 and fully developed by 1910. The neighborhood was mostly white until black residents started moving to the community in the early 1950's. A city ordinance was passed in 1993 to change the name of the park to Malcolm X Park. Former president of Friends of Malcolm X Park, Gregorio Pac Colujun, reported the park was segregated in the 1950s and 1960's and black children were required to play in a designated corner of the park. The park was somewhat blighted and plagued by drug use in the 80's. Community efforts cleaned up the park in the early 90's. The park's summer jazz series started in 1998.

Black Oak Park (now Malcolm X Park) in the early 20th century

== Park features ==
Malcom X Park is 6 acres in size, and features playground equipment, a picnic pavilion, benches and tables, public restrooms.

The park's jazz series, known as "Jazz Heritage Series", is held every other Thursday from May through September.

== See also ==
- List of parks in Philadelphia
