= Malcolm X Boulevard =

Malcolm X Boulevard may refer to:

- Lenox Avenue in Manhattan, New York City, New York (on which both names are used)
- Reid Avenue, the northern extension of Utica Avenue in Brooklyn, New York City, New York (on which the older name is no longer in use)
- Congress Heights in Washington, D.C.
