= Schuylkill River Park Community Garden =

Garden in Philadelphia, Pennsylvania, US

Coordinates: 39.94868°N 75.18193°W

The Schuylkill River Park Community Garden (SRPCG) is a unique approximately 70 plot (over 22,000 square feet (2,000 m^{2}) of land) community garden located at 25th and Manning Streets in Philadelphia, Pennsylvania. The Garden is one of only a very few located on Fairmount Park land, a part of Philadelphia's Park System.

== History ==
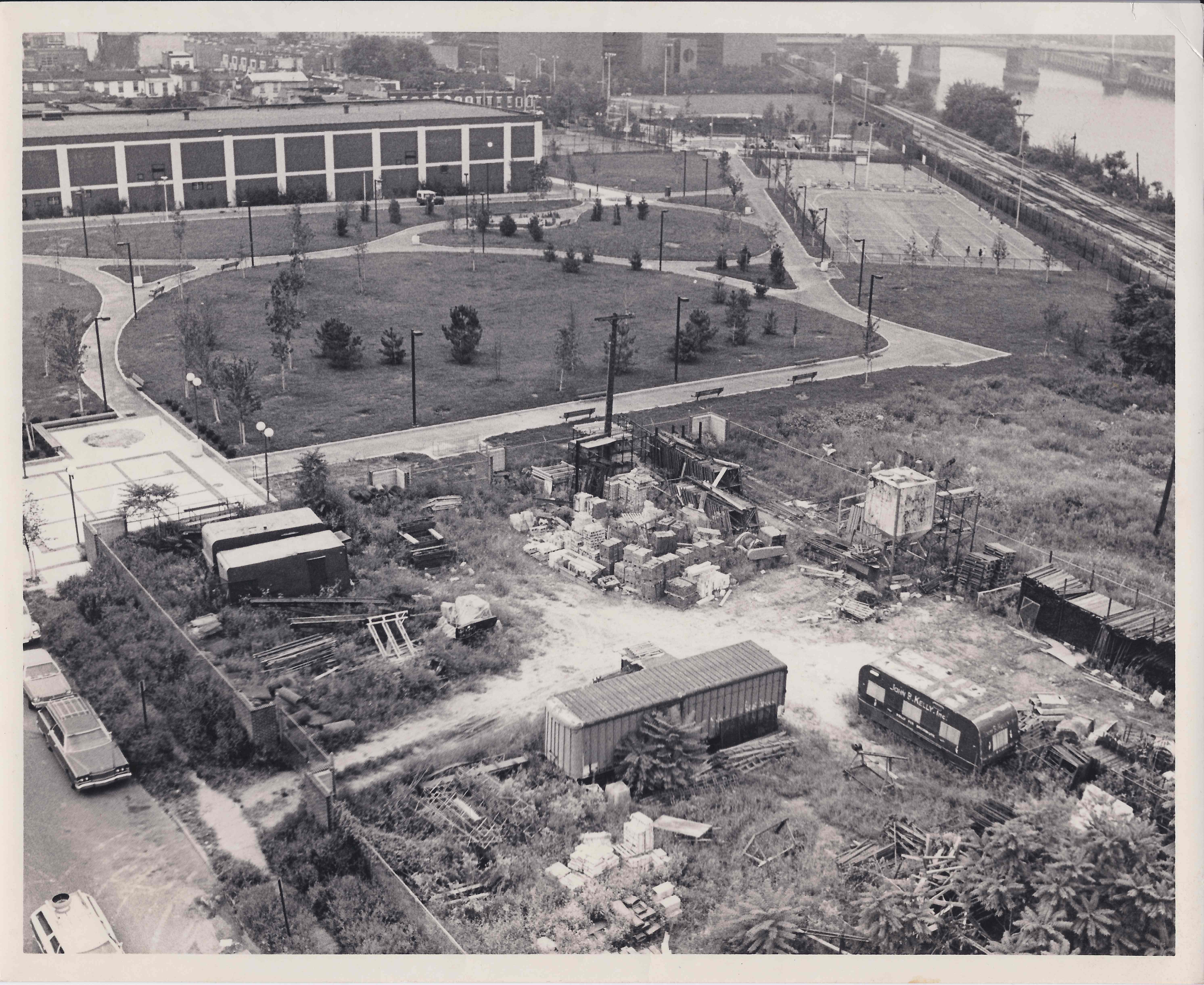
SRPCG Site Before there was a Garden (1970s)

The site that is now the Garden and Schuylkill River Park was previously a B&O Railroad Station, which ran passenger service to New York City among other places, and the Kelly Brickyards. In the early 1980s, Gardeners began to dig out homemade plots, lay borders from cinder blocks and scrap wood, and start growing. They continued in this way happily for several years until the City of Philadelphia acquired the land and in 1984/1985 attempted to adsorb the site into the nascent Schuylkill River Park, writing the Garden out of these plans. Behind the effort to remove the Garden was the city's Managing Director at the time, Leo Brooks, who lived directly across the street and did not like looking out at a bare patch during the winter months. Like many community gardens, the future of this one was in jeopardy.

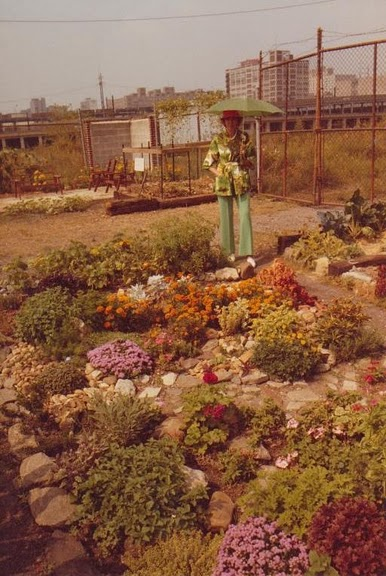
SRPCG in 1982 #2

Through the extraordinary advocacy efforts of the Center City Residents' Association, led at the time by Bob Davidson and other neighbors, and particularly the strong support of Ernesta Ballard, then a commissioner of Fairmount Park and later president of the Pennsylvania Horticultural Society, the city was persuaded to keep the Garden as part of the Park but only with substantial renovations such that it would prove a beautiful site in summer and in winter. John Collins, architect of Schuylkill River Park, was given this task. At its completion in 1988 the City of Philadelphia via Fairmount Park leased the land to the Center City Residents' Association. The Center City Residents' Association currently acts, through the Garden's Steering Committee, as manager of the site. As a tribute to its uniqueness, in January 2007 the SRPCG was invited to become and became part of the Smithsonian Institution's Archives of American Gardens. In 2009, the Garden joined PHS' City Harvest Program. In 2010, the Garden became a National Wildlife Federation certified Wildlife Habitat.

== Current garden ==
The garden now exists in its general 1988 format and thrives as an urban oasis, outlet for gardening, and space for community building. To preserve access to the Garden as a community resource, Gardeners are limited to six year terms - after which time they must relinquish their plots and go back onto a waiting list before returning to the Garden. As with almost all community gardens and consistent with the terms under which it leases the land, the SRPCG maintains residency boundaries that define to whom plot leases can be made. These boundaries follow those of its parent organization, the Center City Residents' Association, exactly. Even with this limitation, the wait for a plot is still at least one to three years.

Starting in 2009 Gardeners began donating hundreds of pounds of produce annually to those in need through the City Harvest Program and working with groups from several local school to provide horticultural opportunities. The City Harvest Program process starts in Philadelphia Prisons, where inmates grow seeds into seedling plants. These plants are distributed to area community gardens who grow them into produce. The produce is donated by gardeners to local food cupboards, who in turn distribute the food to those in need. In the 2010 season, SRPCG distributed over 500 pounds of produce to our food cupboard under the leadership of gardener Linda Zaimis who ran the program in 2011, 2012, and 2013.

In 2008 under the leadership of garden chair Derek Freres (chair for 2008, 2009, 2010, and 2011 seasons) SRPCG began a preservation and re-building effort to address 20 years of wear and tear including a much needed plot border replacement, new lighting, border irrigation and fencing, bench repair and replacement, plumbing upgrades, among other improvements. In total over $40,000 was raised including a substantial amount from SRPCG Gardeners themselves. In addition a long-term maintenance fund was created during these years that perpetually sets aside a percentage of plot fees paid by gardeners each year to accumulate for future improvements.
