= Pier 68 =

Park in Philadelphia

- Location: Pennsport neighborhood of Philadelphia, on a pier jutting into the Delaware River
- Coordinates: 39.9252°N 75.1387°W
- Area: 0.5 acres (2,000 m^{2})
- Created: October 1, 2015
- Designer: Studio Bryan Hanes
- Operated by: Delaware River Waterfront Corporation
- Open: Dawn to dusk, seven days a week, year-round

Pier 68 is a park in Philadelphia on the Delaware River waterfront. It is located at the intersection of Pier 70 Boulevard and the river and forms the southern terminus of the Delaware River Trail. Though it is not a municipal or state park, it is open to the public year-round, seven days per week from dawn til dusk.

== History ==
Originally, the pier was used for industrial purposes: first by John T. Bailey and Co. that manufactured bags, rope, and twine, then purchased by W. J. McCahan in 1872 for use as a sugar warehouse. Today, the property is owned by the Delaware River Waterfront Corp., which led the rehabilitation of the pier into a public-use park. It officially opened to the public on Thursday, October 1, 2015 with a ceremony including then-Mayor Michael Nutter.

== Design ==
The park consists of the original pier, which was shortened by 100 feet and augmented with a sea wall. An lengthwise "aquatic cut" hosts tidal wetlands and reveals the layers of the pier. Most of the park's surface is a concrete deck placed atop the original wooden deck covers most of the park, though there is also a lawn along its southern edge and several stands of trees. Large benches for lounging and picnic tables offer seating. The park has large granite blocks with holes for fishing poles, and it is the only park in the area where fishing is legal.
