= Fairmount Park Horticulture Center (Philadelphia) =

Arboretum and gardens in Philadelphia, Pennsylvania, United States

Coordinates: 39.9834°N 75.2102°W

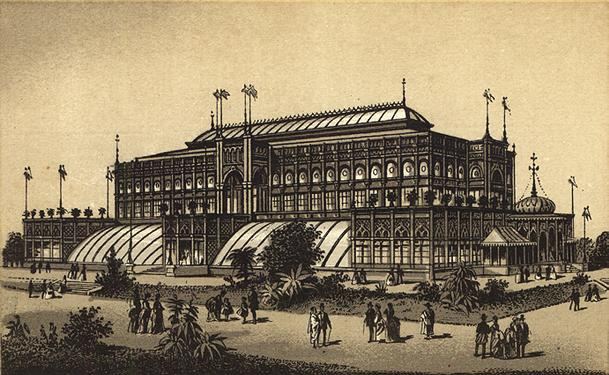
Horticultural Hall (1876, demolished 1955).

The Horticultural Center in Philadelphia, USA, contains an arboretum, greenhouse, demonstration gardens, and an exhibition hall. It is located within Fairmount Park at the southeast corner of Belmont and Montgomery Drives. The grounds are open daily except holidays, without charge. An admission fee is charged for the Japanese house.

The Horticulture Center was built for the 1976 United States Bicentennial celebration, on the site of Philadelphia's earlier Horticultural Hall, built in 1876 for the Centennial Exposition. Its grounds contain:

- The 27-acre (11 ha) Centennial Arboretum
- An exhibition hall
- A 31,000-square-foot (2,900 m^{2}) greenhouse with tropical plants
- Seven demonstration gardens
- Shofuso Japanese House and Gardens, with the house built in the 16th century shoin-zukuri style.
- Centennial comfort stations

== See also ==
- List of botanical gardens in the United States
