= Centennial comfort stations =

Coordinates: 39.98295°N 75.2102°W

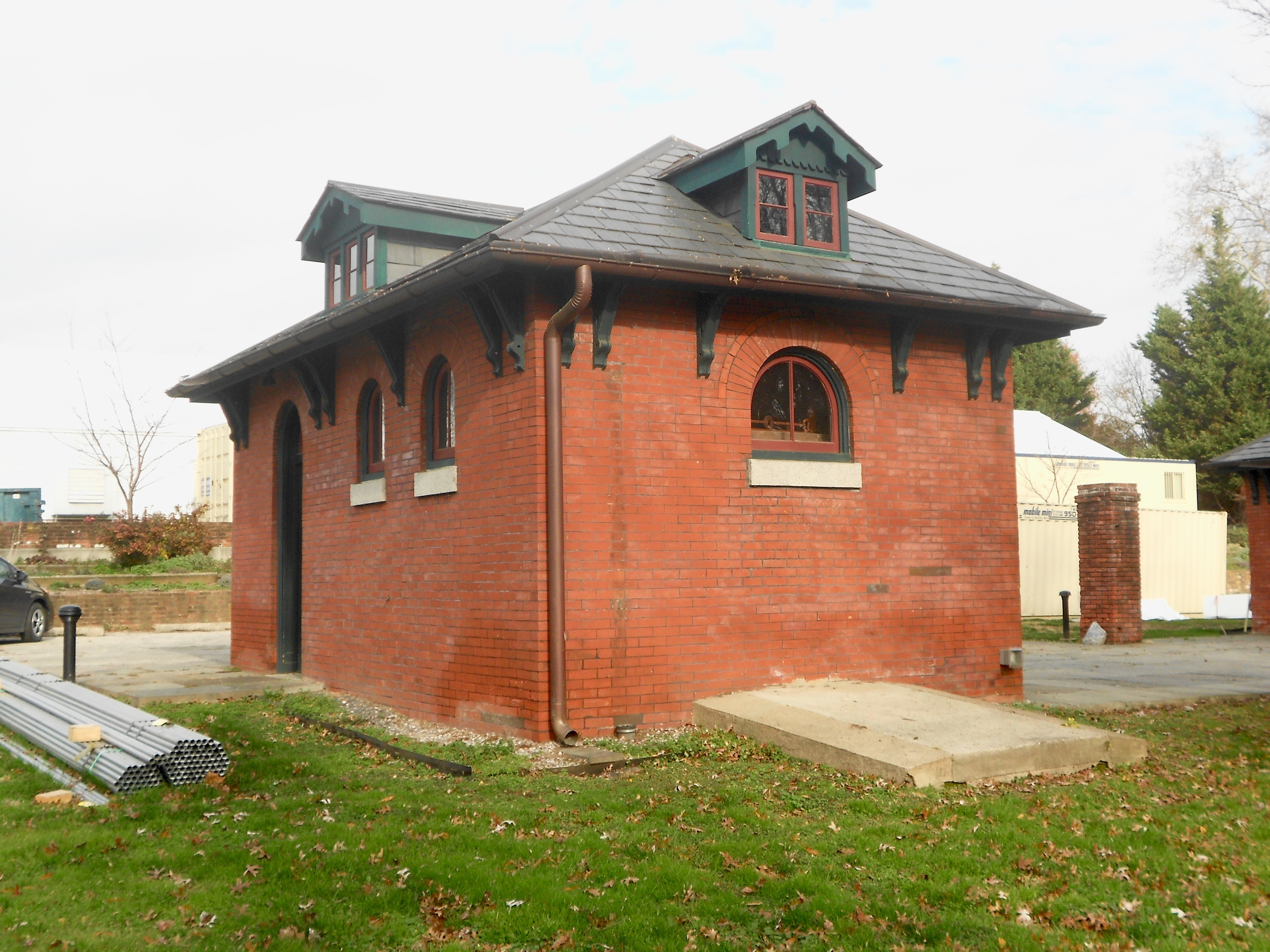
The western comfort station from the southwest

The Centennial comfort stations are two brick buildings in Philadelphia's Fairmount Park originally built for the 1876 Centennial Exposition. They were located south of the now-demolished Horticulture Building and used as public toilets.

== History ==
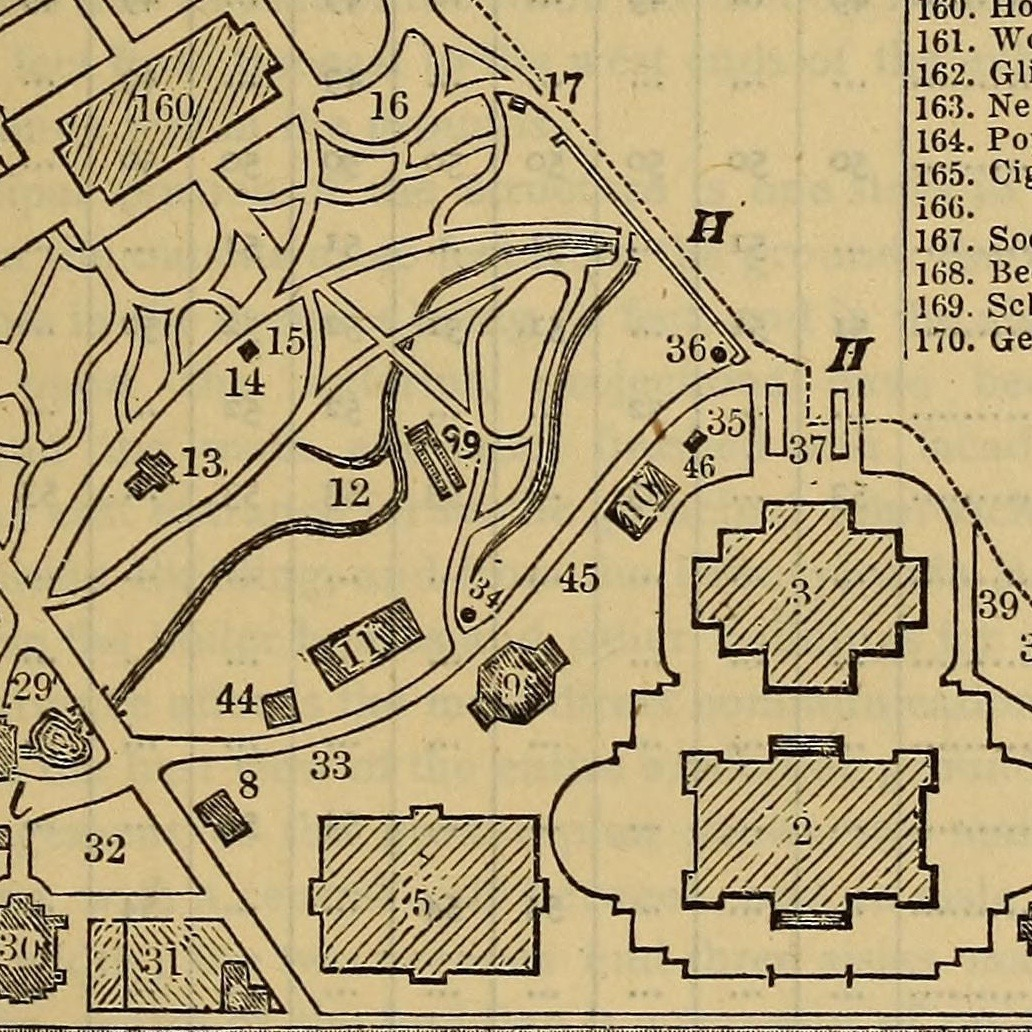
Cropped 1876 map of the Centennial Exposition. The comfort stations are labelled (14). Memorial Hall (2) is in the lower right-hand corner. The Horticulture Building (160) is in the upper left-hand corner

The two buildings are perhaps the only extant restrooms from a nineteenth century international exposition. They were constructed of brick with wooden elements, slate roofs and copper detailing. Each is about 20 feet (6.1 m) by 22 feet (6.7 m) and one story tall. Seven public comfort stations were built for the exposition, among over 200 other buildings. Only four Centennial buildings survive on their original sites: Memorial Hall, the Ohio State Building, and the two comfort stations.

The Horticulture Building was one of the few buildings at the exposition intended to be permanent, and the comfort houses were likely built of brick so that they could continue to serve the Horticulture Building. When the Horticulture Building was destroyed in 1955, they were used as storage space and greatly deteriorated. A new Horticulture Center was constructed for the 1976 United States Bicentennial immediately north of the comfort stations. Renovation of the stations began in 2011 for use by the Shofuso Japanese House and Gardens, the eastern station as an exhibition space, and the western as a restroom. The eastern station renovation has been completed, while the western station is still in use as storage space.

During renovation, before 2016, the buildings were served by a port-a-potty.

The comfort stations are located within the 1972 Fairmount Park historic district listing on the National Register of Historic Places, but are not included among the 43 buildings in its inventory of historic buildings.

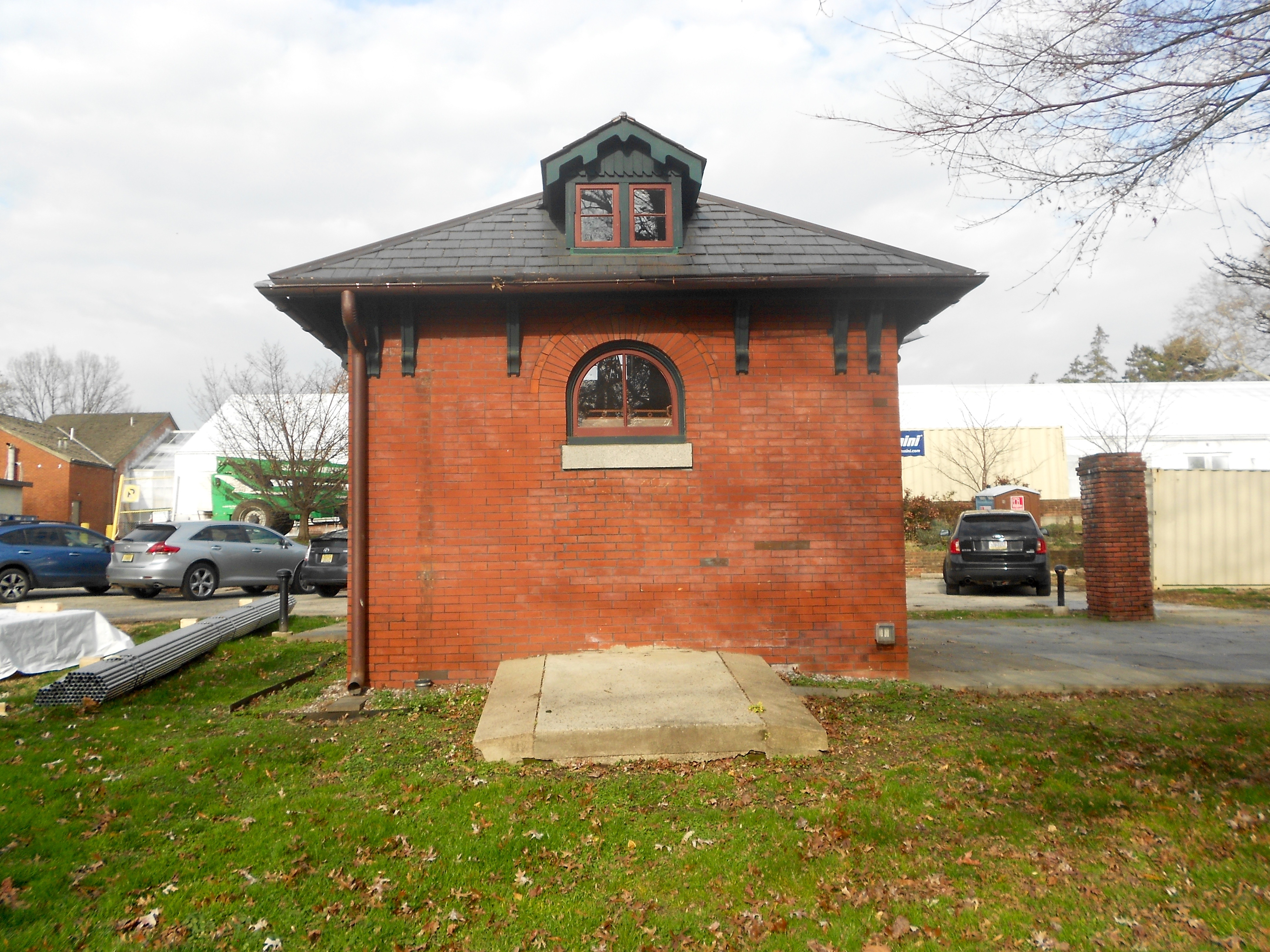
Western station from the south

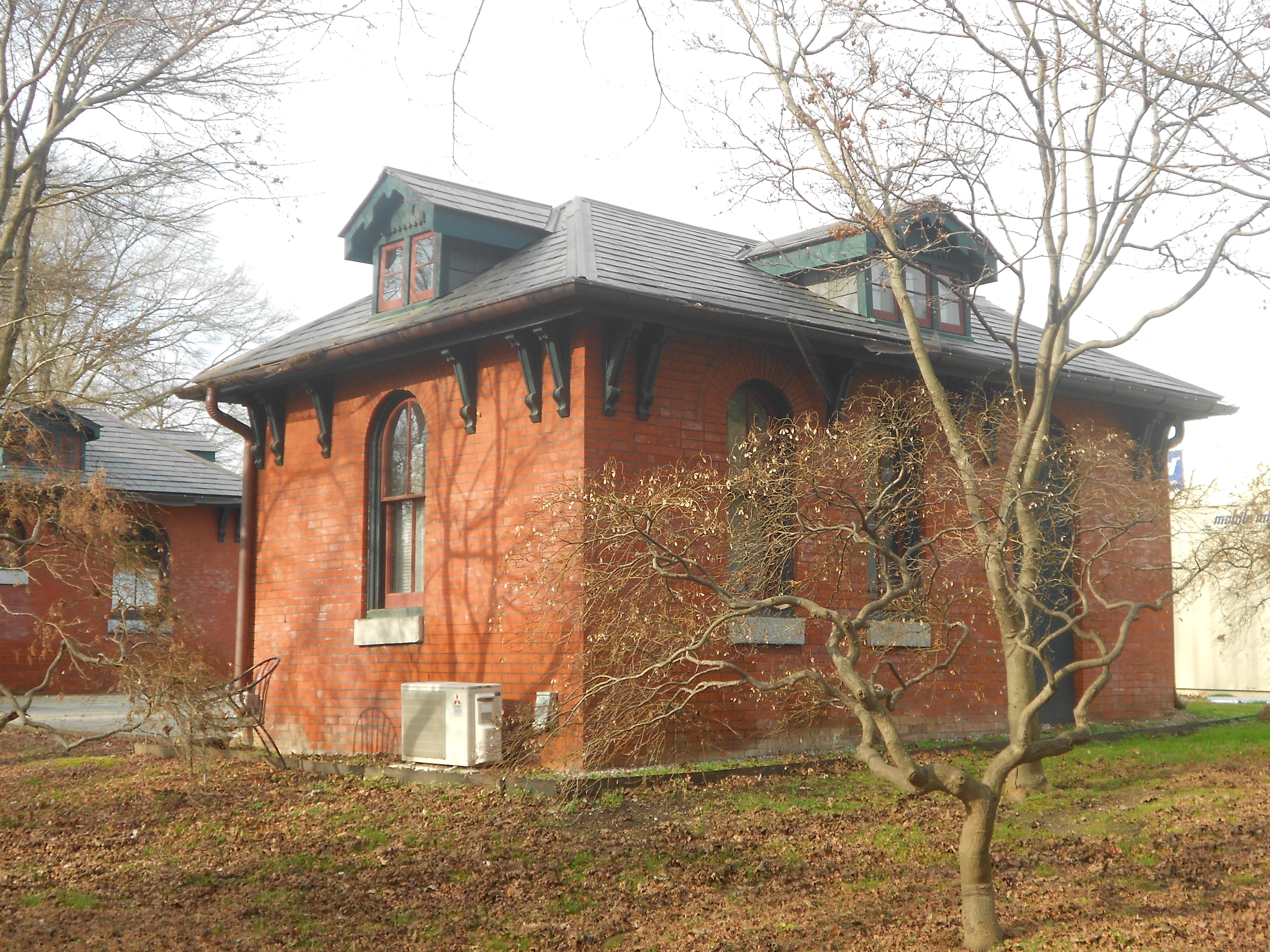
Eastern station from the southwest

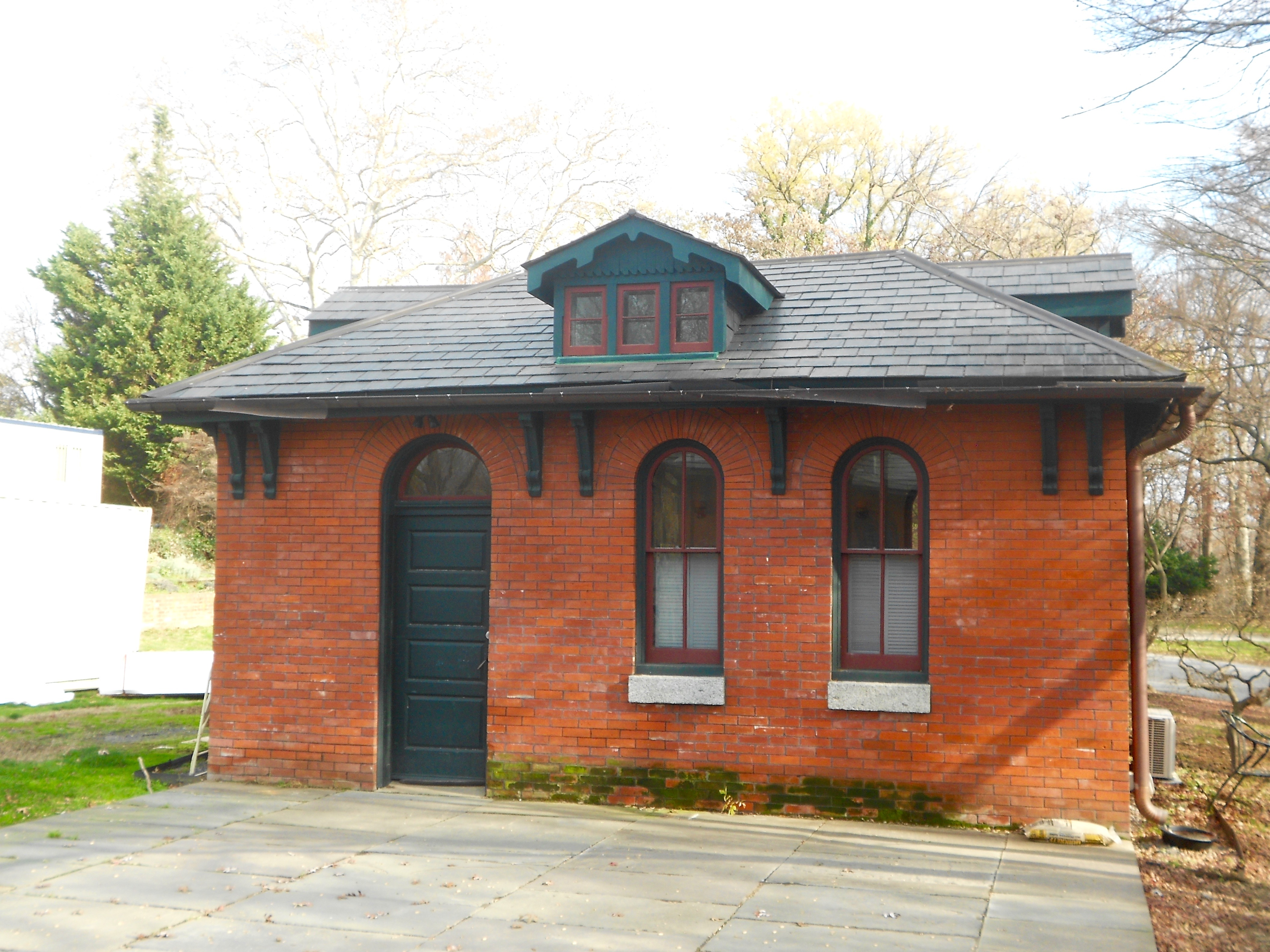
Eastern station from the east

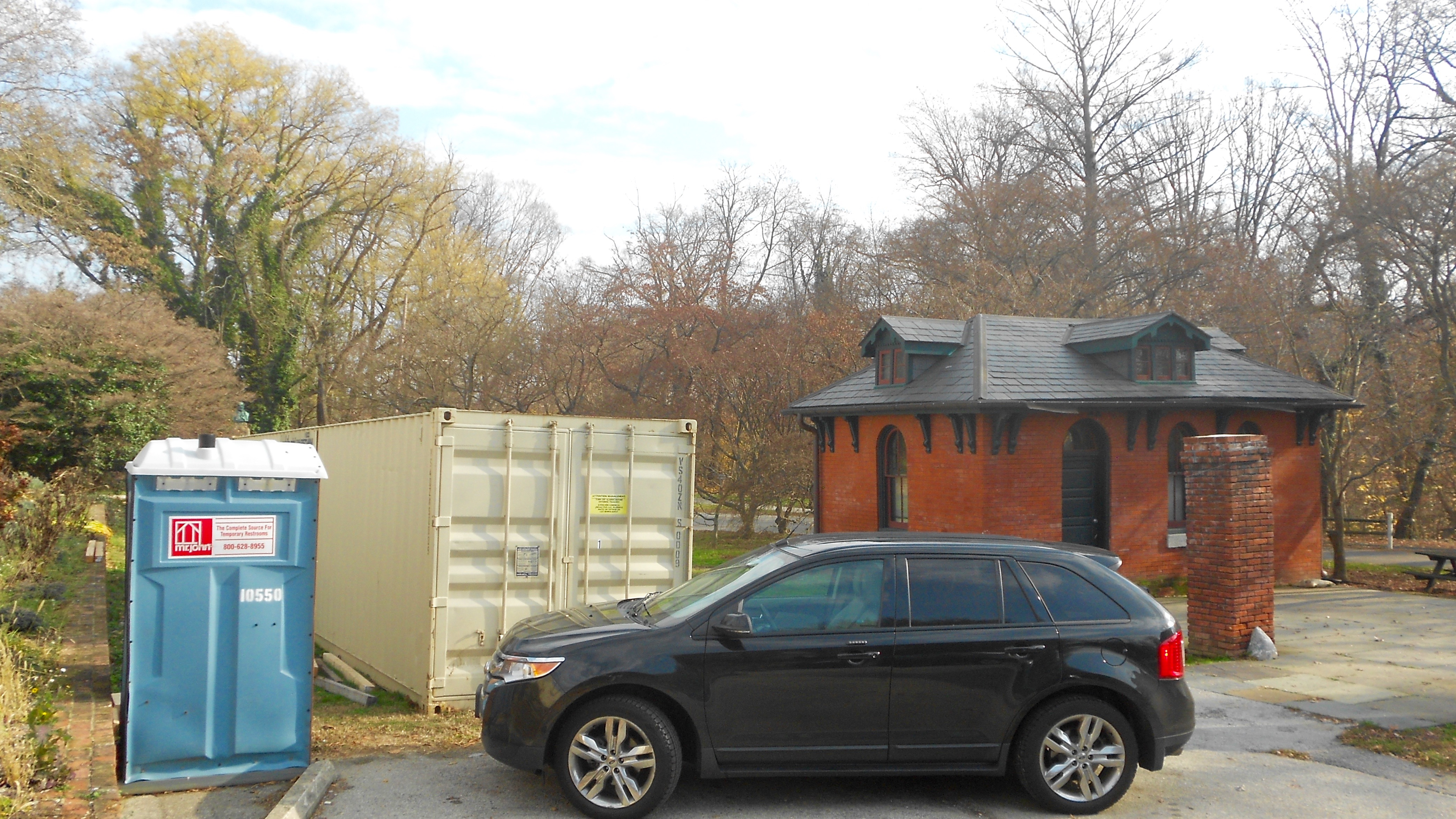
Construction site in 2015. Port-a-potty has since been removed.

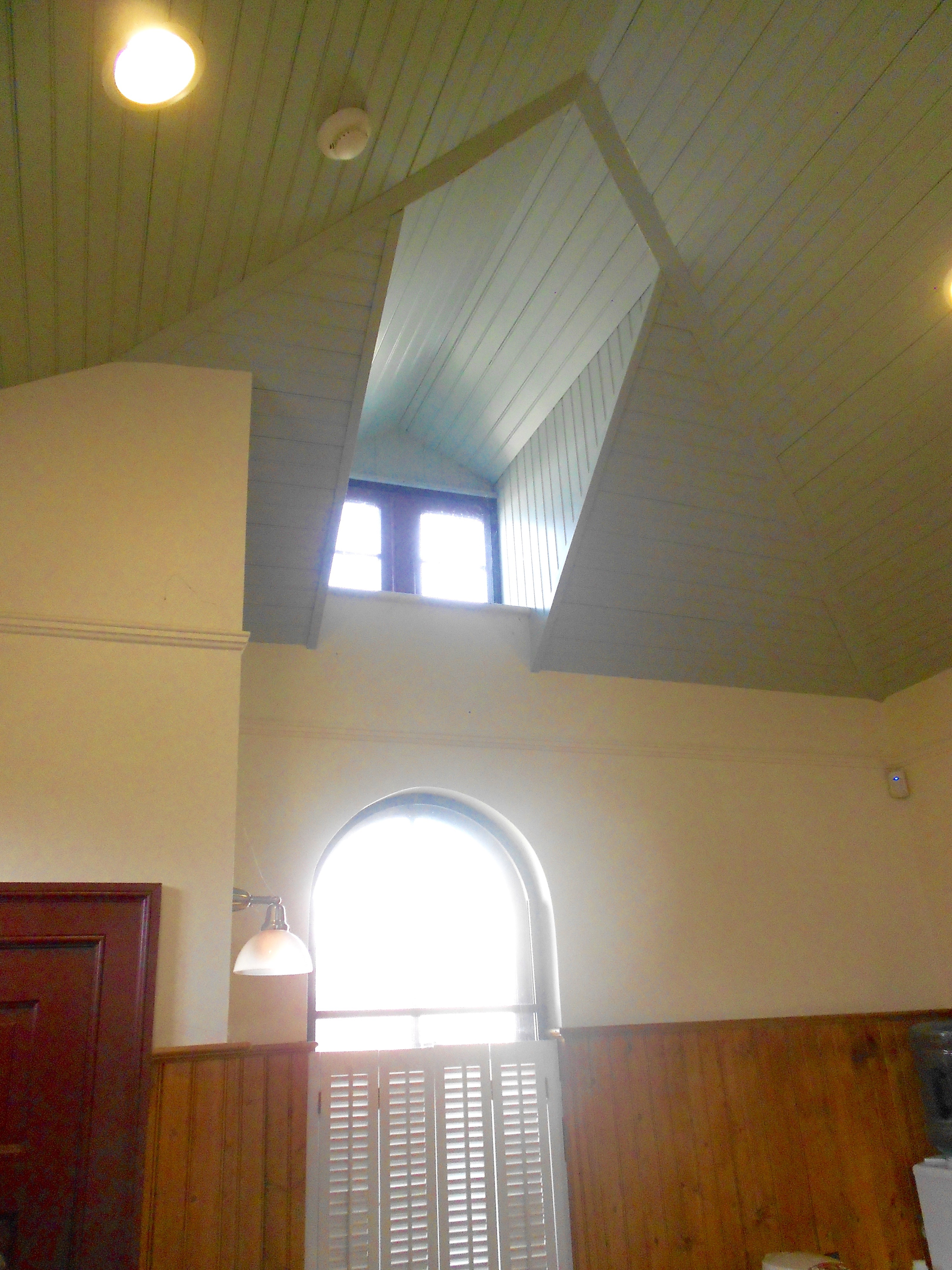
Interior south wall of the renovated eastern station

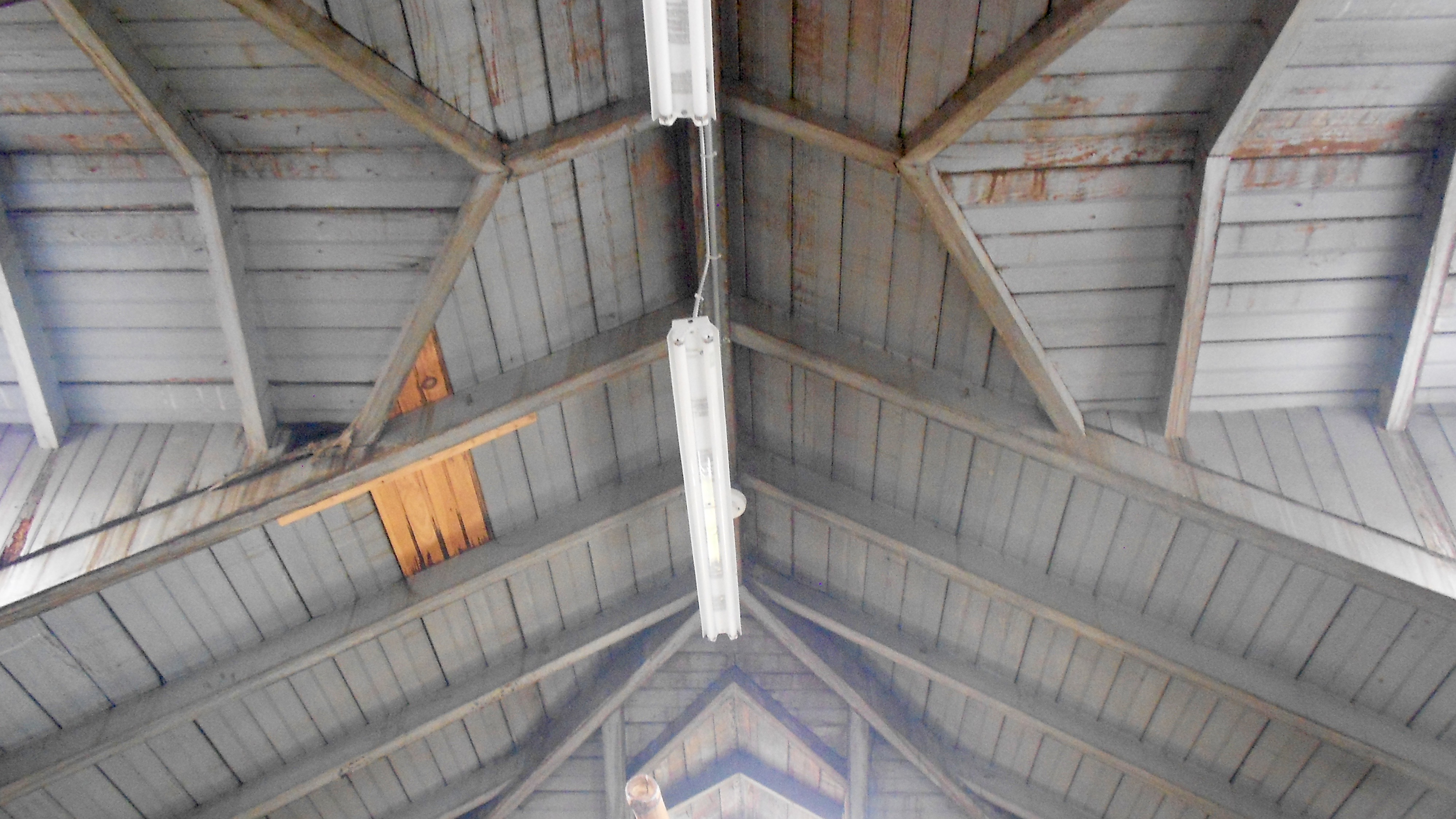
Roof interior in the western station

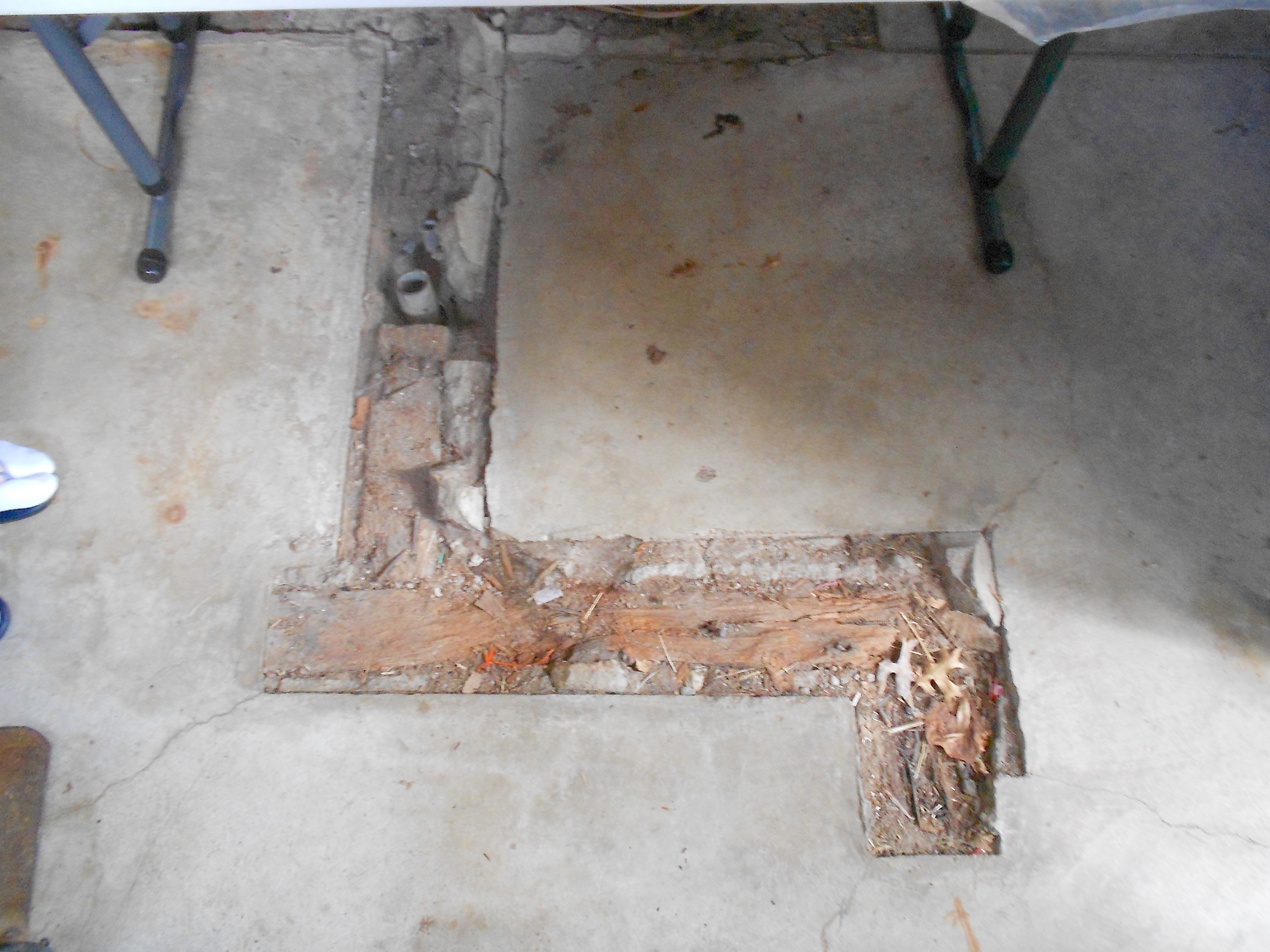
Floor in the western station, possibly showing wall footings and plumbing remnants
