= Centennial Arboretum =

Arboretum in Philadelphia, Pennsylvania

Coordinates: 39.982957°N 75.210449°W

- Shofuso Japanese House and Garden at the arboretum.
- Interactive map of Centennial Arboretum
- Location: Philadelphia, Pennsylvania

Centennial Arboretum (27 acres) is an arboretum located at the Horticulture Center, Fairmount Park, at the southeast corner of Belmont and Montgomery Drives, Philadelphia, Pennsylvania. It is open daily without charge.

The arboretum contains specimen trees and shrubs from Asia, Europe, and North America. Many were planted in 1876 for the American Centennial Exposition. Nearby is the traditional-style Shofuso Japanese House and Garden brought to Philadelphia in 1957.

The Centennial Arboretum is the location of the Subaru Cherry Blossom Festival of Greater Philadelphia, a Japanese matsuri or celebration of spring produced by the Japan America Society of Greater Philadelphia.

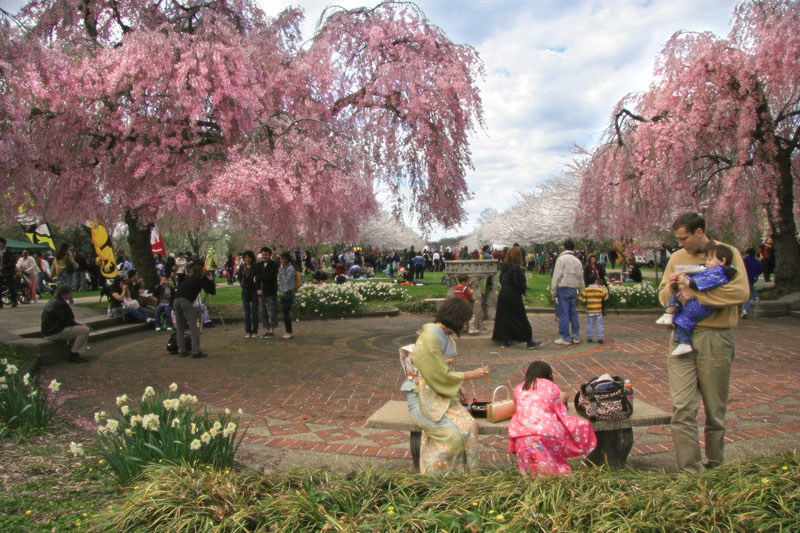
Subaru Cherry Blossom Festival at the Centennial Arboretum

== See also ==
- List of botanical gardens in the United States
