= Commandant's Quarters =

Commandant's Quarters or Commandant's House may refer to:

- Commandant's Quarters (Dearborn, Michigan), listed on the NRHP in Michigan
- Commandant's Quarters (Fort Gibson, Oklahoma), listed on the NRHP in Oklahoma
- Commandant's House (Walnut Ridge, Arkansas), listed on the NRHP in Arkansas
- Commandant of Cadets Building, US Air Force Academy, Aurora, CO, listed on the NRHP in Colorado
- Commandant's House (Hillsborough, North Carolina), listed on the NRHP in North Carolina
- Commandant's House (Oak Ridge, North Carolina), part of the Oak Ridge Military Academy Historic District in Oak Ridge, North Carolina
- Dragoon Commandant's Quarters, Fort Gibson, Oklahoma, listed on the NRHP in Oklahoma
- Commandant's Quarters (Philadelphia, Pennsylvania), listed on the NRHP in Philadelphia, Pennsylvania
- Commandant's Residence, Quarters Number One, Fort Adams, Newport, RI, listed on the NRHP in Rhode Island
- Commandant's Office, Washington Navy Yard, Washington, D.C., listed on the NRHP in Washington, D.C.
- Commandant's Residence (Home King, Wisconsin), listed on the NRHP in Wisconsin
- U.S. Marine Corps Barracks and Commandant's House, Washington, D.C.
- Commandant's Residence, Royal Military College of Canada, Kingston, Ontario, Canada
