= Herman J. Schwarzmann =

American architect

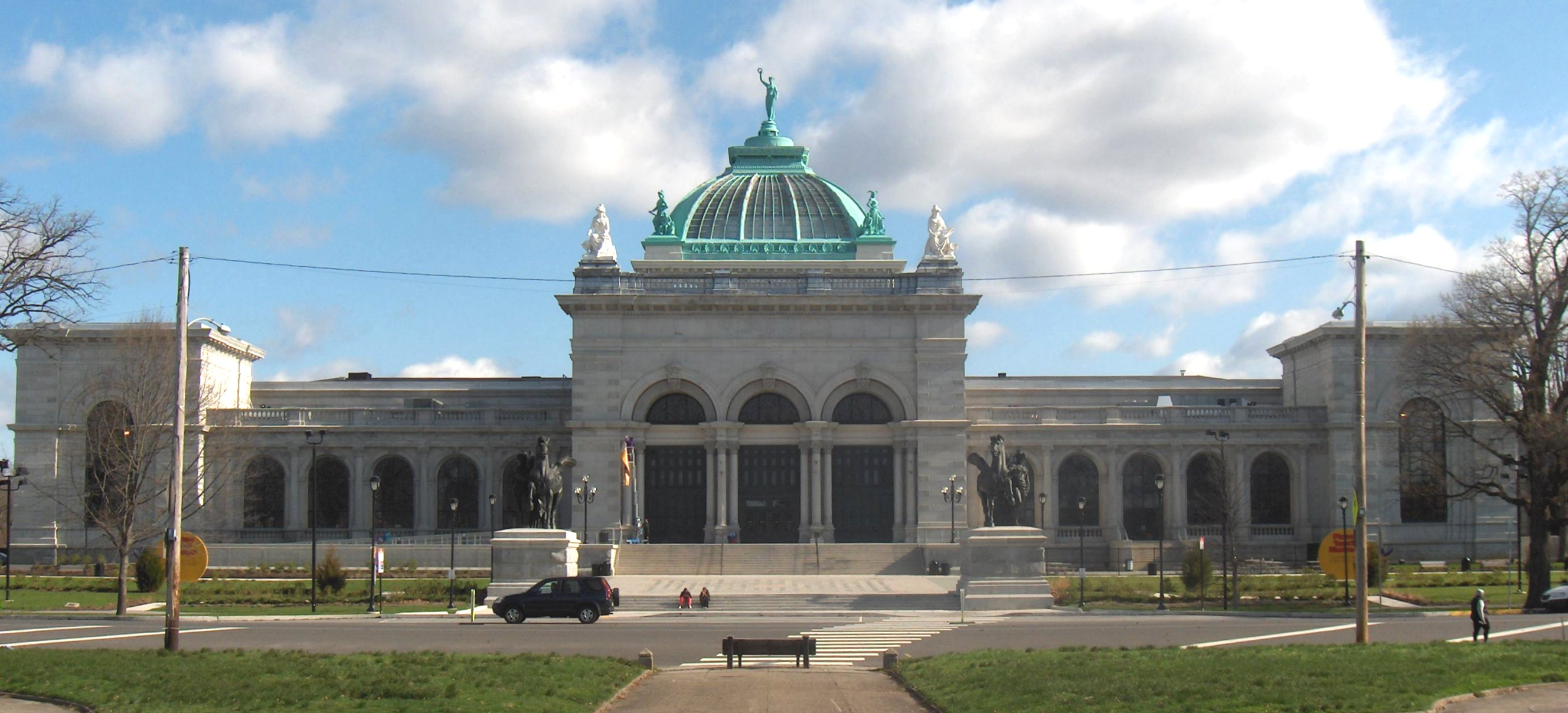
Renovated Memorial Hall in Philadelphia. (2010)

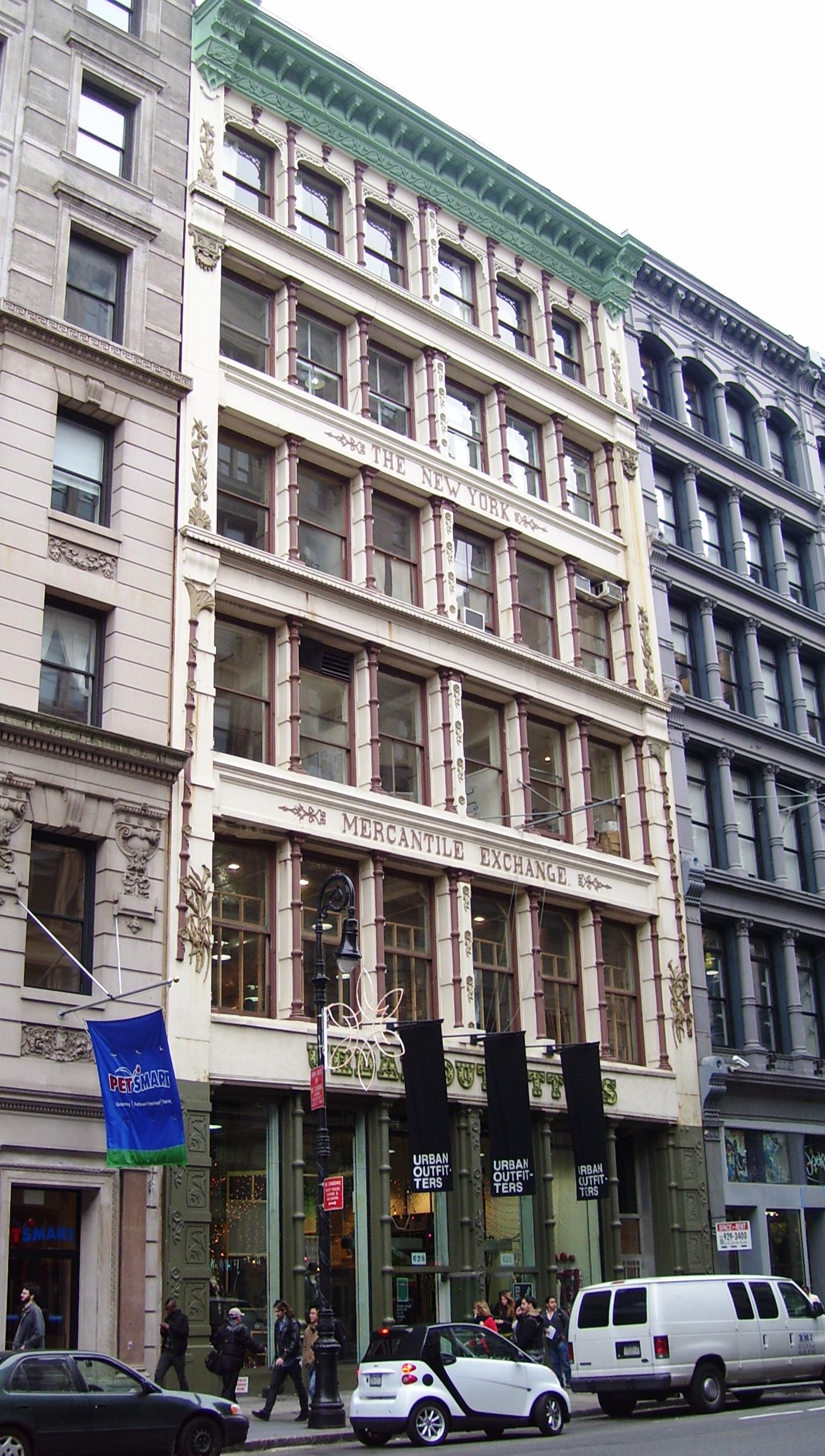
New York Mercantile Exchange, 628 Broadway, Manhattan, New York City

Herman J. Schwarzmann (1846–1891), also known as Hermann J. Schwarzmann, was a German-born American architect who practiced in Philadelphia and later in New York City.

== Early life ==
Schwarzmann was born in Munich. Before emigrating to the United States in 1868, Schwarzmann graduated from the Royal Military Academy in Munich, and was commissioned a lieutenant in the Bavarian Army.

== Philadelphia ==
Schwarzmann began working for the Fairmount Park Commission in 1869 as an assistant engineer, and in 1873 worked on landscaping the grounds of the Philadelphia Zoo. He was the chief architect for the Centennial Exposition of 1876, designing Memorial Hall, Horticultural Hall, and other buildings.

Beginning in 1876, Schwarzmann attempted to go into private architectural practice, but was unsuccessful in Philadelphia.

== New York City ==
Schwarzmann moved to New York City and was successful there, achieving national prominence, and working until his retirement in 1888. He designed the New York Mercantile Exchange building in 1882.
