= Please Touch Museum =

Children's museum in Philadelphia, Pennsylvania

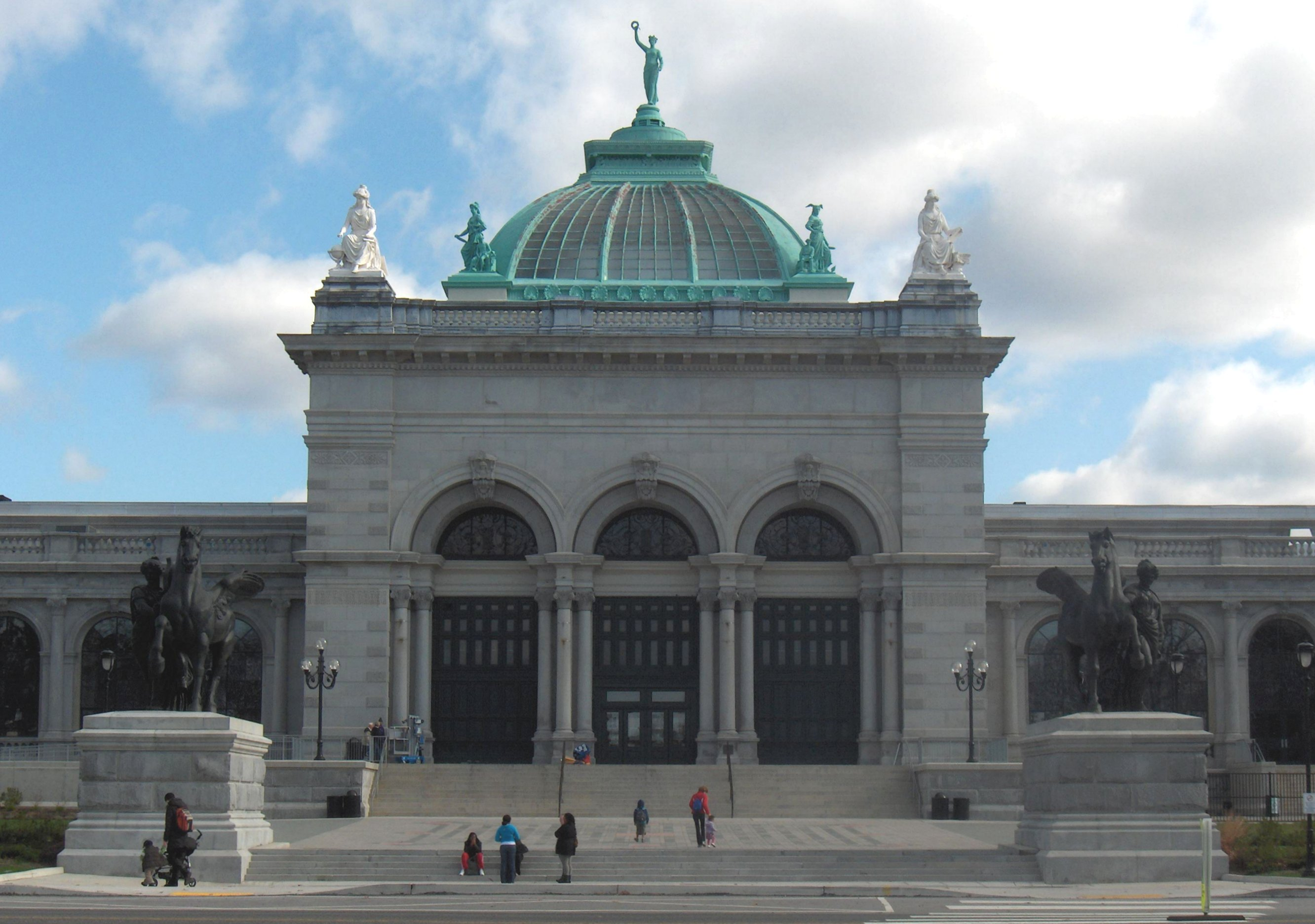
- Memorial Hall in 2010

- Location within Philadelphia
- Established: 2 October 1976
- Location: Memorial Hall, Fairmount Park; 4231 Avenue of the Republic, Philadelphia, Pennsylvania
- Coordinates: 39.9795°N 75.2092°W
- Type: Children's museum
- Accreditation: American Alliance of Museums
- Visitors: 566,000 (2011)
- Founder: Portia Sperr
- President: Melissa Weiler Gerber
- CEO: Melissa Weiler Gerber
- Public transit access: SEPTA bus: 38, 40; Philly PHLASH
- Website: Pleasetouchmuseum.org

The Please Touch Museum is a children's museum located in the Centennial District of Philadelphia, Pennsylvania, United States. The museum focuses on teaching children through interactive exhibits and special events, mostly aimed at children seven years old and younger.

== History ==
External videos
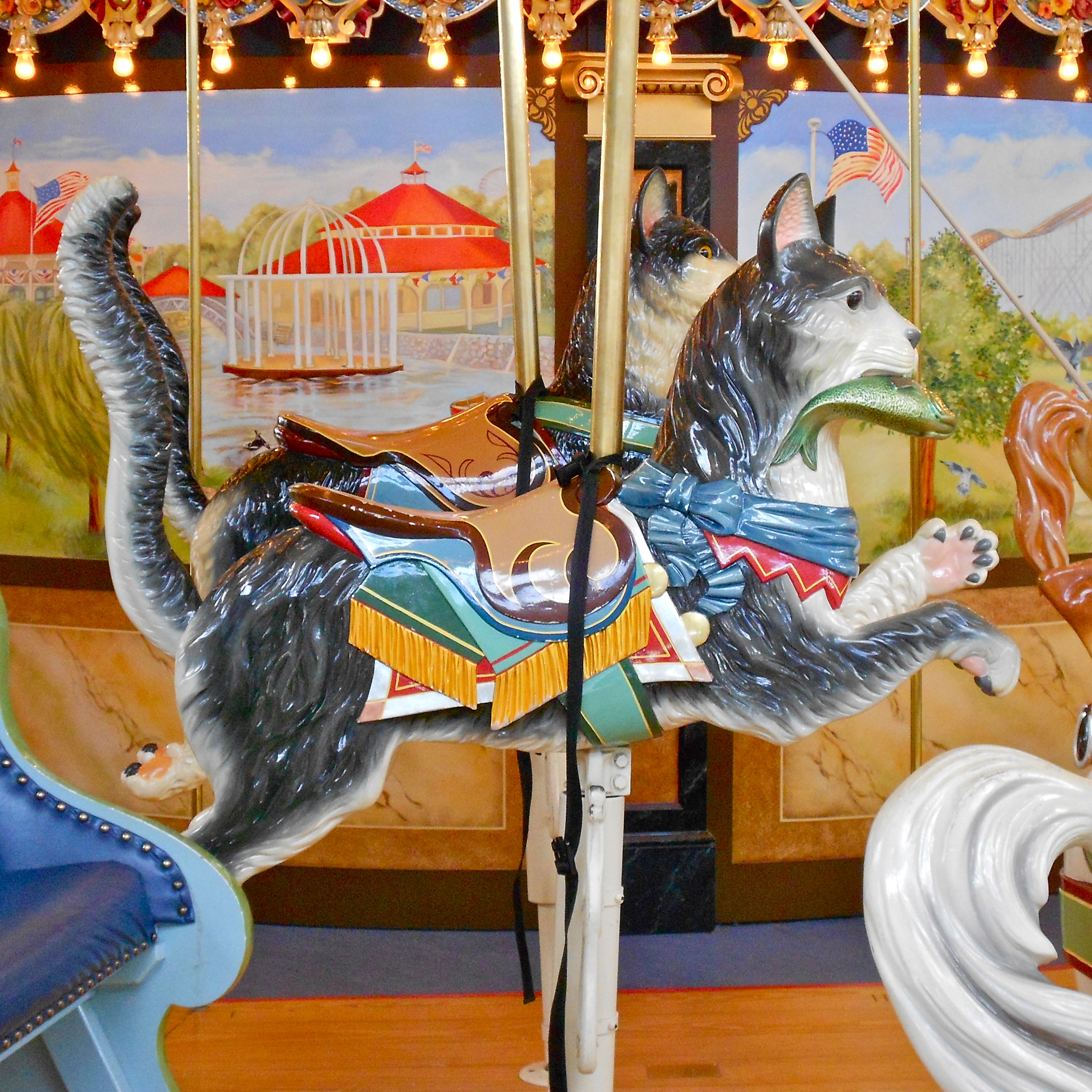
- All About Please Touch Museum, Please Touch Museum, November 2011, 2:53
- Opera Company of Philadelphia Please Touch Museum Random Act of Culture, Opera Philadelphia, April 2011, 2:31

The museum originally opened at the Academy of Natural Sciences on October 2, 1976, in a 2,200-square-foot (200 m^{2}) space, and moved to another location on nearby Cherry Street two years later. In 1983, the museum moved to 21st Street near the Franklin Institute. On February 14, 2005, the museum received an 80-year lease for Memorial Hall (in Fairmount Park), the last major building left from the 1876 Centennial Exposition. This came after plans to relocate the museum to a location at Penn's Landing fell through. Renovations at Memorial Hall began on December 15, 2005, and the museum closed its 21st Street location on September 1, 2008. On October 18, 2008, the museum opened at its current location with a larger facility and more exhibits.

The museum's financial projections related to its move to Memorial Hall proved to be over-optimistic and it was forced to declare bankruptcy in 2015. It emerged from bankruptcy in 2016 and, with the help of new major donations, was able to announce that it was now debt-free.

On September 24, 2018, the Philadelphia Flyers introduced their new mascot, Gritty, at the Please Touch Museum. A furry purple monster mascot, Squiggles, was introduced at the Please Touch Museum on October 7, 2018.

== Exhibits ==
- Adventure Camp
- Centennial Innovations
- Cents and Sensibility
- Food & Family
- Happy Camper
- Imagination Playground
- Please Touch Garden
- River Adventures
- Roadside Attractions
- Rocket Room
- Storytime Cabin
- Wonderland
- Scale Model of the 1876 Centennial Exhibition

== Other ==
- Woodside Park Dentzel Carousel

== Programs ==
- Playhouse Theater - As a component of the museum experience, Playhouse performances by in-house performers present opportunities for playful learning, imagination, innovation and audience interaction featuring music, movement, folklore and/or puppetry, all while introducing children to live arts.
- Creative Arts Studio - Each month, there is a new set of art experiences, which include a studio art experience, a sensory art experience and a manipulative art experience. The Creative Arts Studio provides a setting for parent-child interaction.
- Albert M. Greenfield Makerspace - Focused on how kids are creating, not what they are creating, the Makerspace empowers children to think of themselves as an “inventor” and through facilitated and self-directed experiences, discover that learning is found in the process of making, not the end result.

== Great Friend to Kids (GFTK) Awards ==
The Association of Children's Museums initiated the Great Friend to Kids Award in 1991, to honor individuals who have made outstanding contributions toward strengthening education for children. National Great Friend to Kids Award winners include Fred Rogers ("Mister Rogers") and Marian Wright Edelman (president and founder of the Children's Defense Fund).

In 1996, the Please Touch Museum began presenting its own GFTK award, to coincide with the museum's 20th birthday. The awards honor individuals and organizations making outstanding contributions to enriching the lives of children. The 2009 awards were designed by Philadelphia artist Leo Sewell, creator of Please Touch Museum's own "Artie the Elephant" and the Statue of Liberty Arm & Torch created entirely from discarded toys.

== See also ==
- List of children's museums in the United States (alphabetical)
- Category:Children's museums in the United States (by state)
