= Memorial Hall (Philadelphia) =

- U.S. National Register of Historic Places
- U.S. National Historic Landmark
- Philadelphia Register of Historic Places
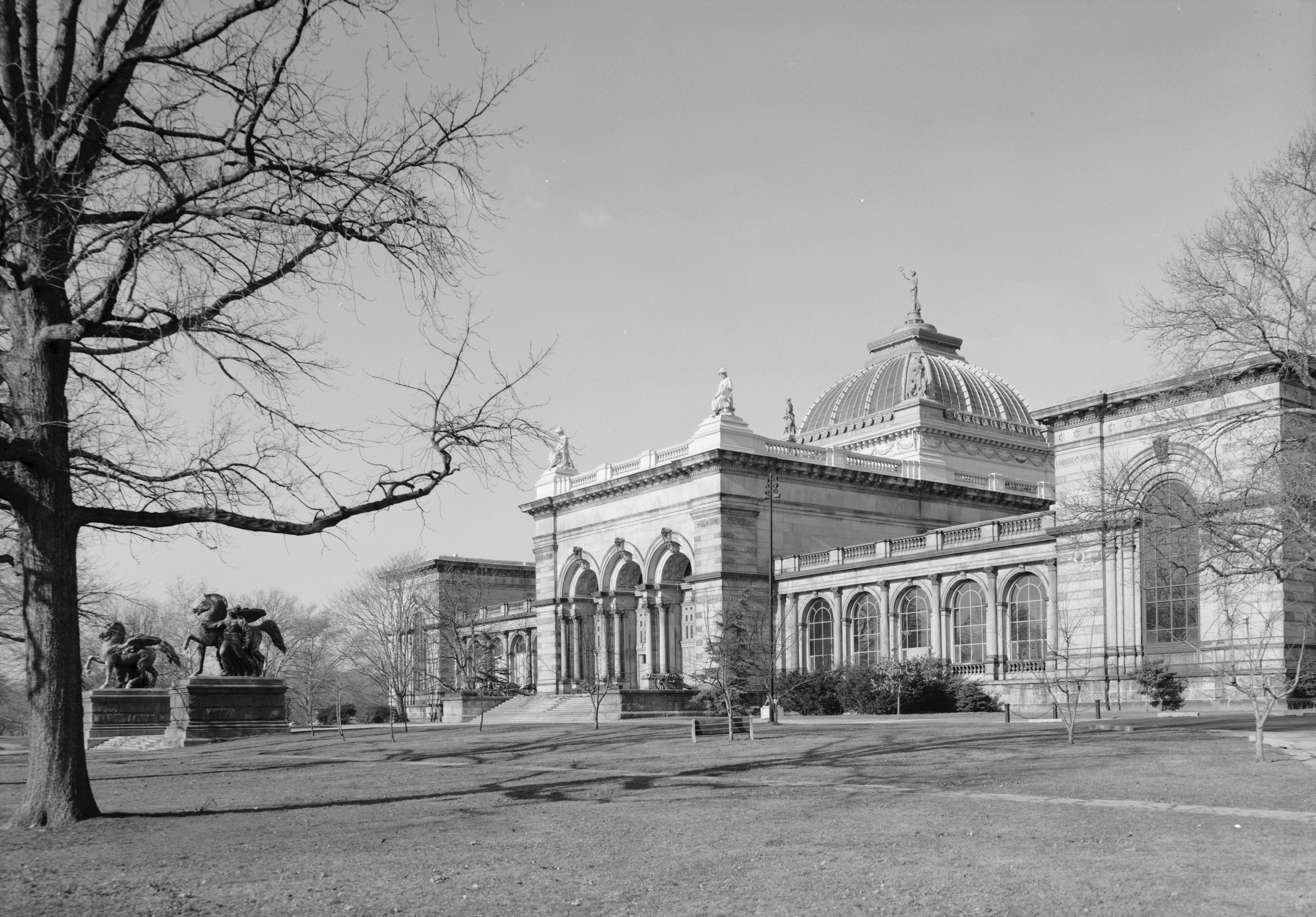
- Home of the Please Touch Museum

- Location within Philadelphia Location within Pennsylvania Location within the United States
- Location: West Fairmount Park; 4231 Avenue of the Republic; Philadelphia, Pennsylvania 19131
- Coordinates: 39°58′45″N 75°12′35″W
- Area: 3 acres (1.2 ha)
- Built: 1876
- Architect: Herman J. Schwarzmann
- Architectural style: Beaux-Arts
- NRHP reference No.: 76001665

Significant dates
- Added to NRHP: December 8, 1976
- Designated NHL: December 8, 1976

Memorial Hall is a Beaux-Arts style building in the Centennial District of West Fairmount Park, Philadelphia, Pennsylvania. Built as the art gallery for the 1876 Centennial Exposition, it is the only major structure from that exhibition to survive. It subsequently housed the Pennsylvania Museum of Industrial Art (now the Philadelphia Museum of Art).

Since October 18, 2008, the Hall has served as home to the Please Touch Museum. It was designated a National Historic Landmark in 1976.

The building is located west of the Schuylkill River, at the corner of East Memorial Hall Drive and the Avenue of the Republic.

== History ==
Memorial Hall was designed by Herman J. Schwarzman, and is an early example of monumental Beaux-Arts architecture in the United States. Schwarzman, the chief engineer of the Fairmount Park Commission, also designed the temporary Horticultural Hall for the Exposition. The building cost $1.5 million to construct and was made without wood, making it fireproof, which was innovative for the time.

The exterior is finished with granite and the interior is decorated with marble and ornamental plaster. The building is 365 feet (111 m) by 210 feet (64 m) with basement and ground floor, and 150 feet (46 m) tall at the top of the building's most distinctive feature, an iron and glass dome. Surmounting the dome is the 23-foot-tall (7.0 m) statue of Columbia (the poetic symbol of the United States) holding a laurel branch. At the corners of the dome stand four statues symbolizing industry, commerce, agriculture and mining. Memorial Hall was the inspiration for the Reichstag building in Berlin.

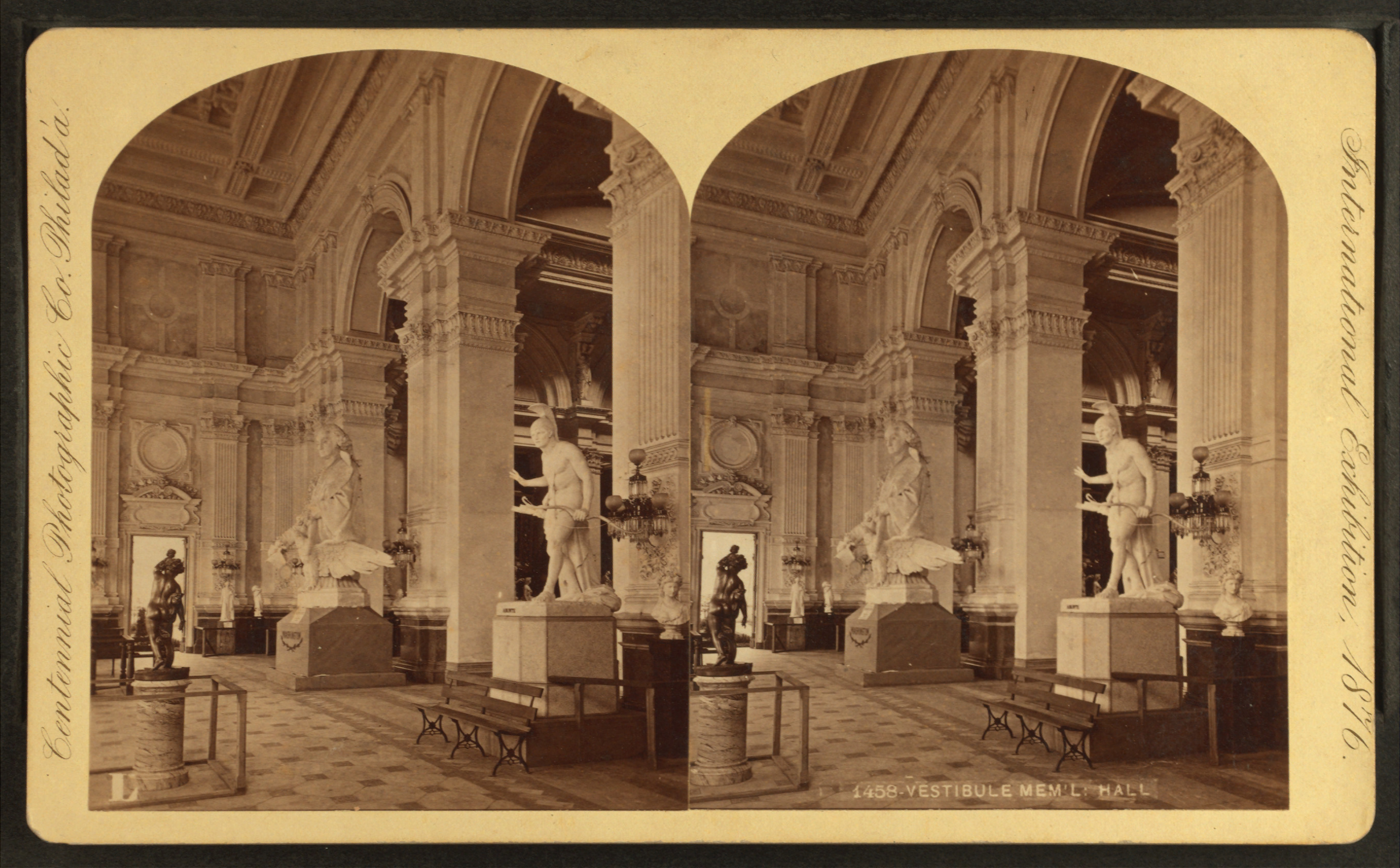
Vestibule, during the 1876 Centennial Exposition.

=== Centennial Exposition ===
Construction of the hall began on 6 July 1874 and was completed for the opening ceremonies on May 10, 1876. President Ulysses S. Grant dedicated the building with a ribbon-cutting ceremony. The President was joined by both Houses of Congress, and Supreme Court, and the Emperor Pedro II of Brazil to kick off the event. Nearly ten million visitors walked through Memorial Hall during the exhibition that lasted from May to November.

Memorial Hall was designed to house the Centennial Exposition's art exhibits. The exposition received so many art contributions that a separate annex was built to house them all. Another building was built for the display of photography. The hall was one of over two hundred buildings constructed on the property of Fairmount Park to display exhibits.

=== After the Exposition ===
Memorial Hall reopened in 1877 as the museum portion of the Pennsylvania Museum and School of Industrial Art. The building closed in 1928 when the Philadelphia Museum of Art opened on the Benjamin Franklin Parkway. The Fairmount Park Commission took over the building in 1958 where it made its offices.

The hall was used as a police station for a period of time and has also housed a gymnasium and a swimming pool in its wings.

The building was added to the National Register of Historic Places on December 8, 1976. The building had fallen into great disrepair by 2000 and was used mainly for art storage. The Fairmount Park Commission sought a new tenant to help restore the building to its former glory. The Please Touch Museum signed an eighty-year lease for the building in 2005 and began extensive renovations.

== Key events and usage ==
=== Philadelphia Orchestra recordings ===
In the 1980s and 1990s, the Philadelphia Orchestra made a number of recordings in a basketball court in Memorial Hall under the batons of Riccardo Muti and Wolfgang Sawallisch. Memorial Hall was used because the Academy of Music, the orchestra's home at the time, was considered not resonant enough.

=== Richie Ashburn viewing ===
In September 1997, a viewing for former Philadelphia Phillies baseball player and long-time broadcaster Richie Ashburn was held shortly after his death from a heart attack in New York City. Several hundred thousand people mourned his death as they walked by his casket in the Grand Hall.

=== Please Touch Museum ===
In 2005, the Please Touch Museum began an $85-million renovation to convert it into its new home. The museum opened its doors to the public on October 18, 2008. Memorial Hall's eastern lawn serves as the home field for Athletic Base Ball Club of Philadelphia, a vintage base ball team which plays by 1864 rules.

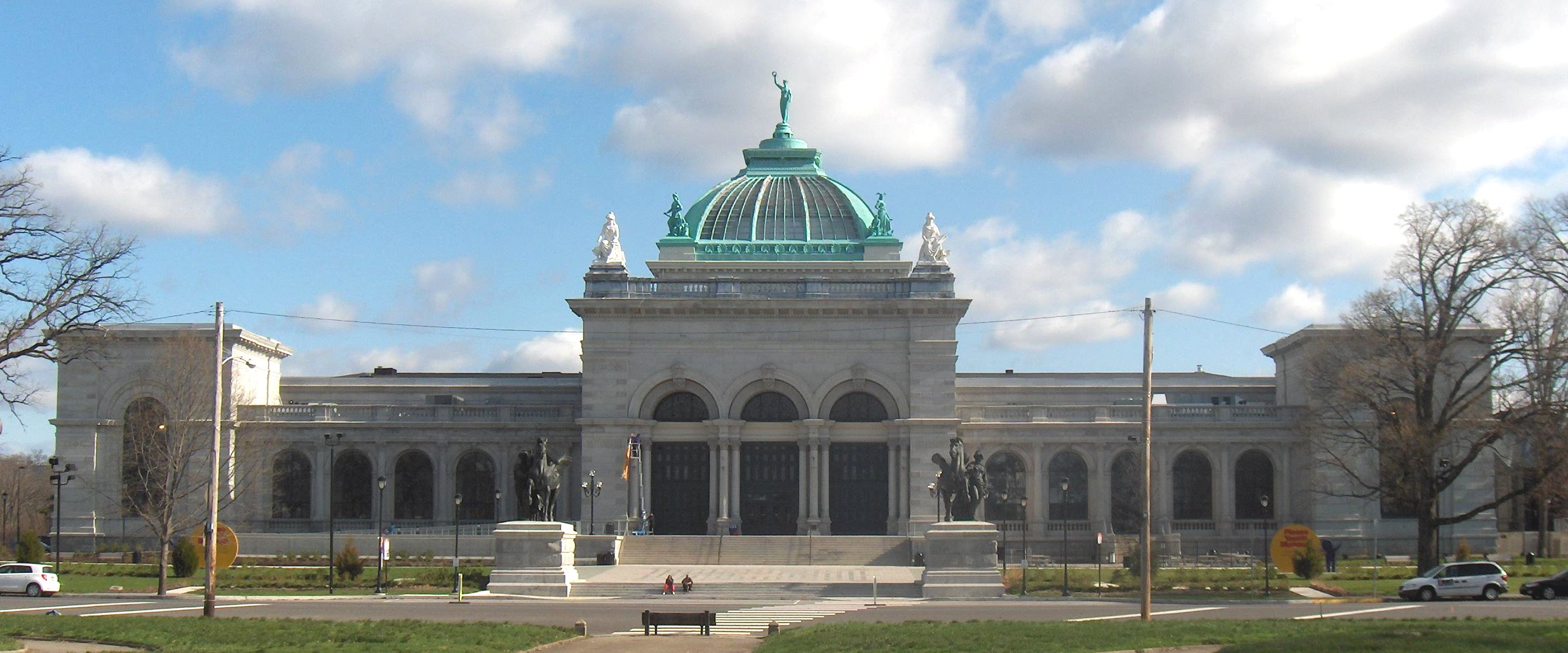
Renovated Memorial Hall (March 2010)

== Gallery ==
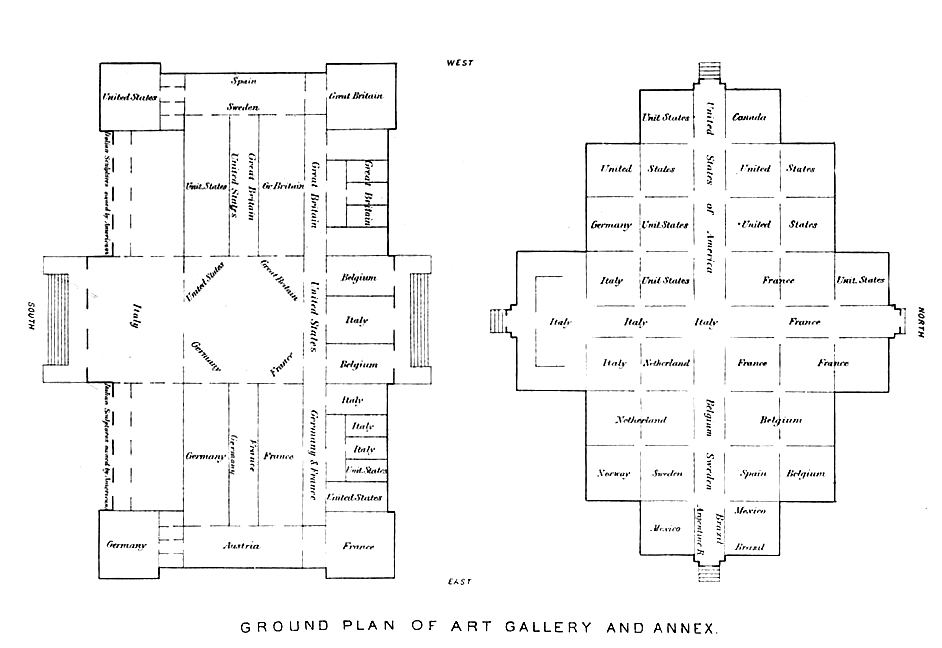
Ground plan of Art Gallery and Annex (1876).

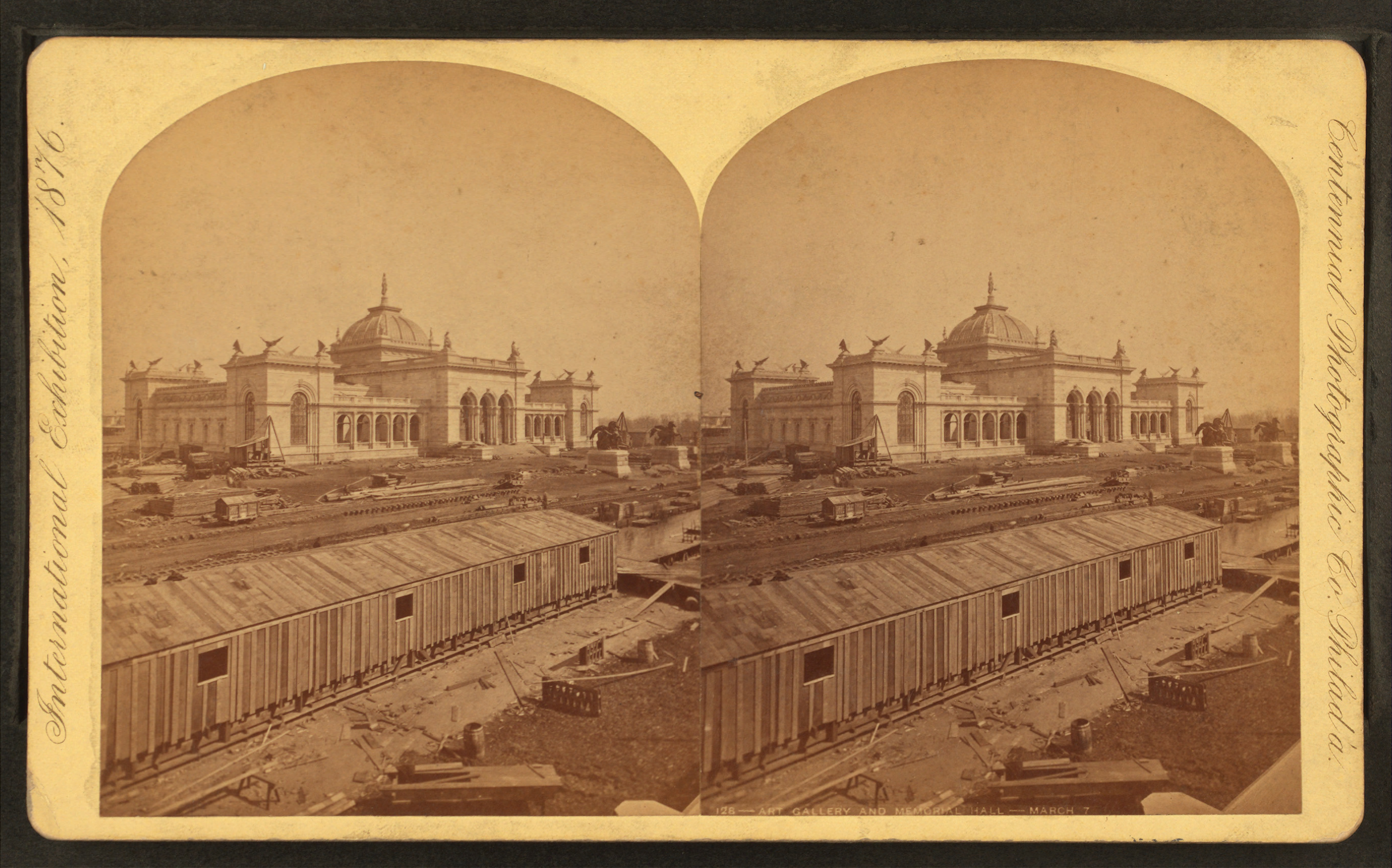
Nearing completion (March 7, 1876).

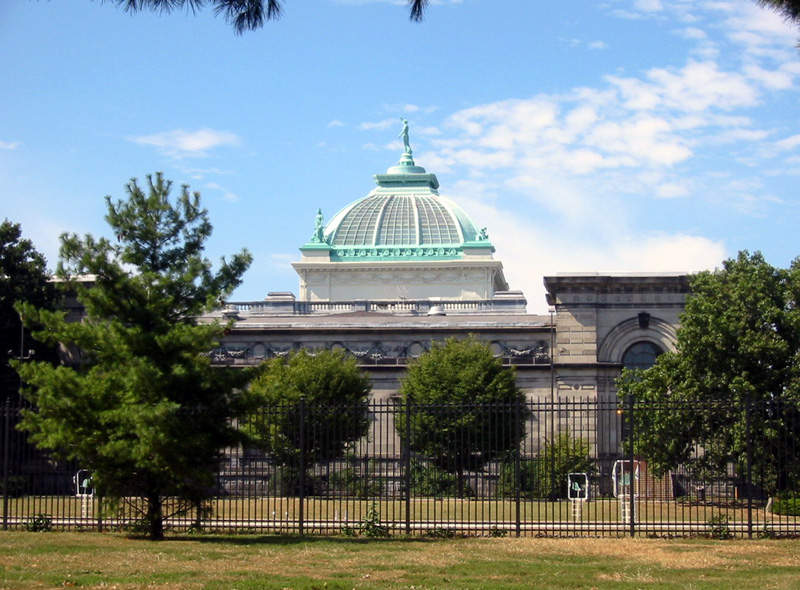
East facade

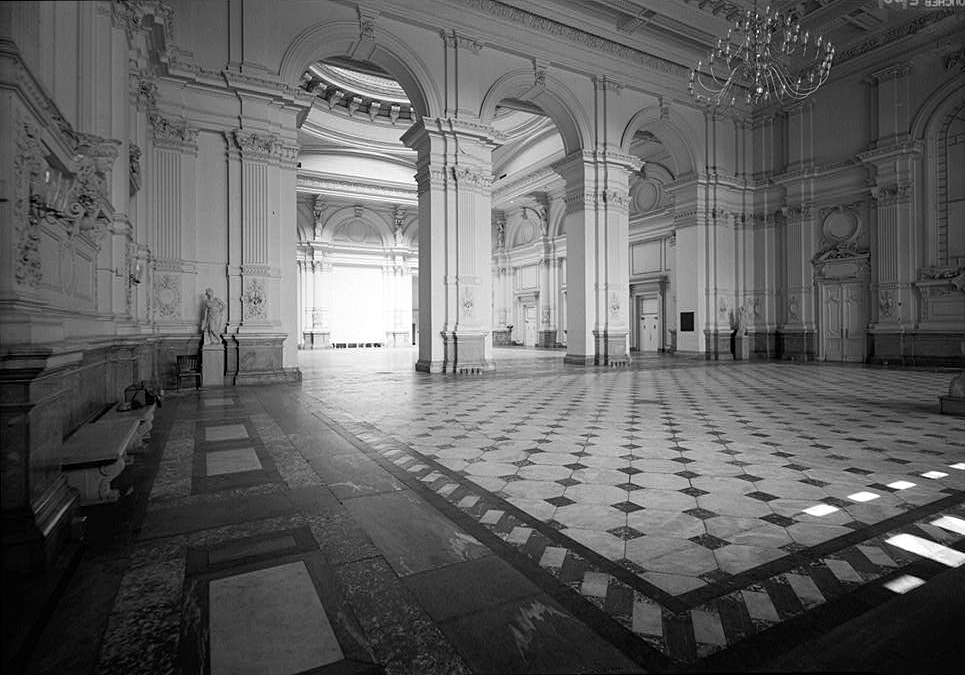
Southwest vestibule

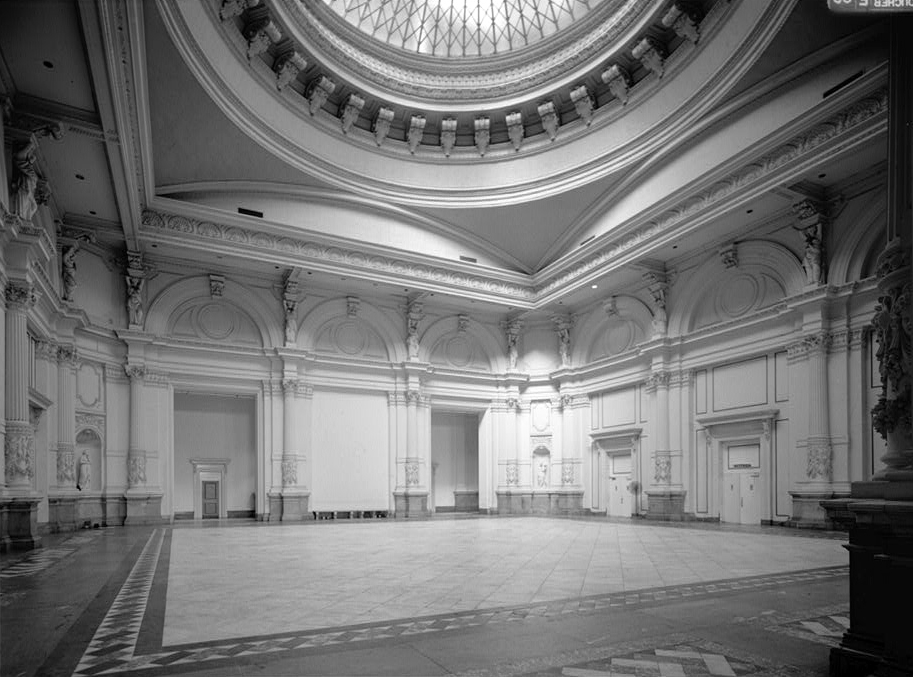
Rotunda

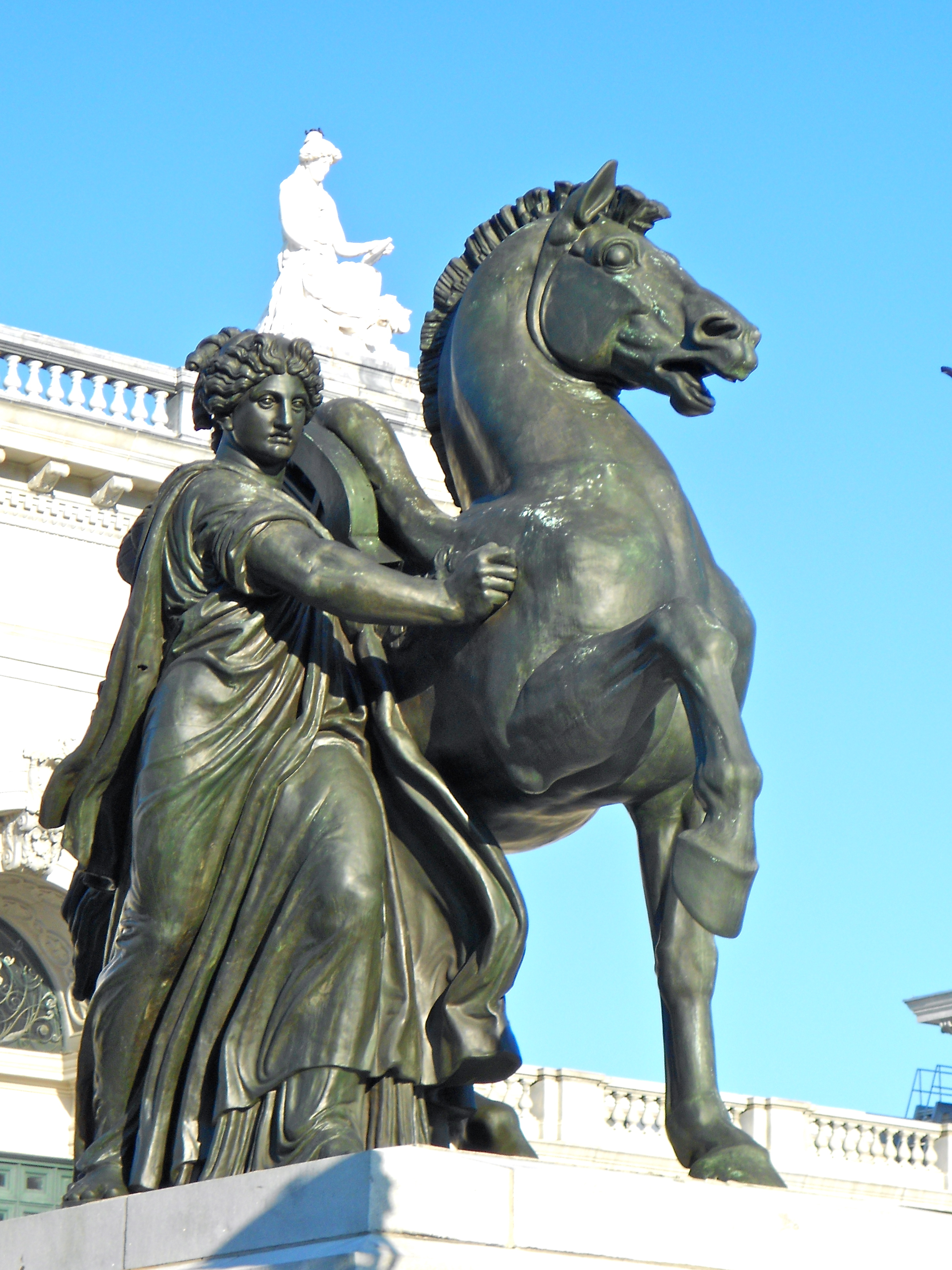
Statue near entrance

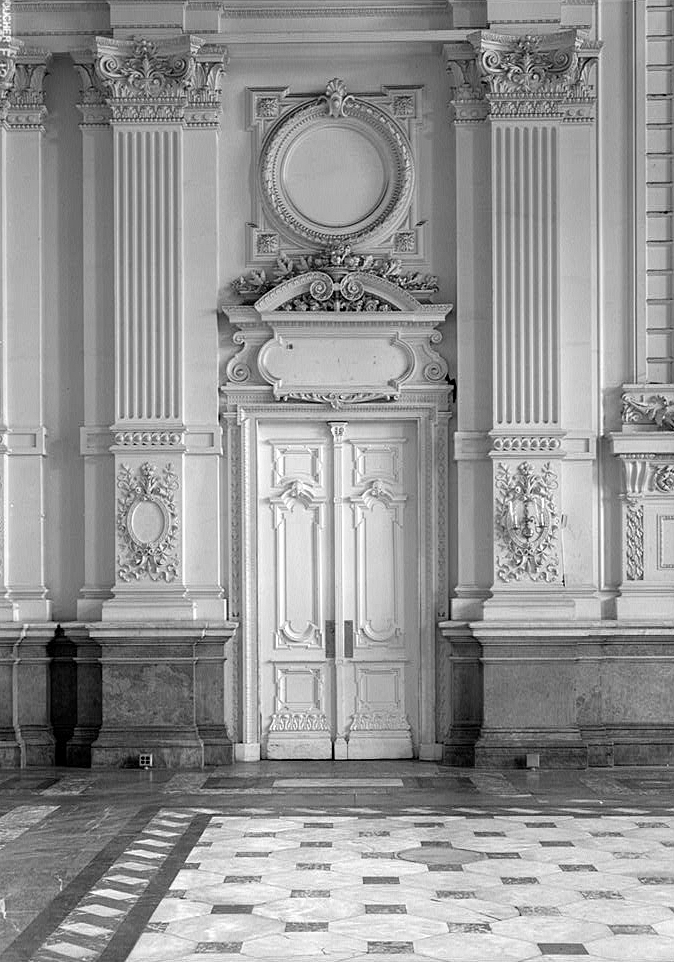
Beaux-Arts doorway

== See also ==
- List of National Historic Landmarks in Philadelphia
- National Register of Historic Places listings in West Philadelphia
- Ohio House - the Ohio state exhibit for the Centennial, which is also still standing
- Centennial comfort stations - two comfort stations, which are also still standing
