= Philadelphia Naval Shipyard =

US Navy shipyard in Pennsylvania

- Philadelphia, Pennsylvania
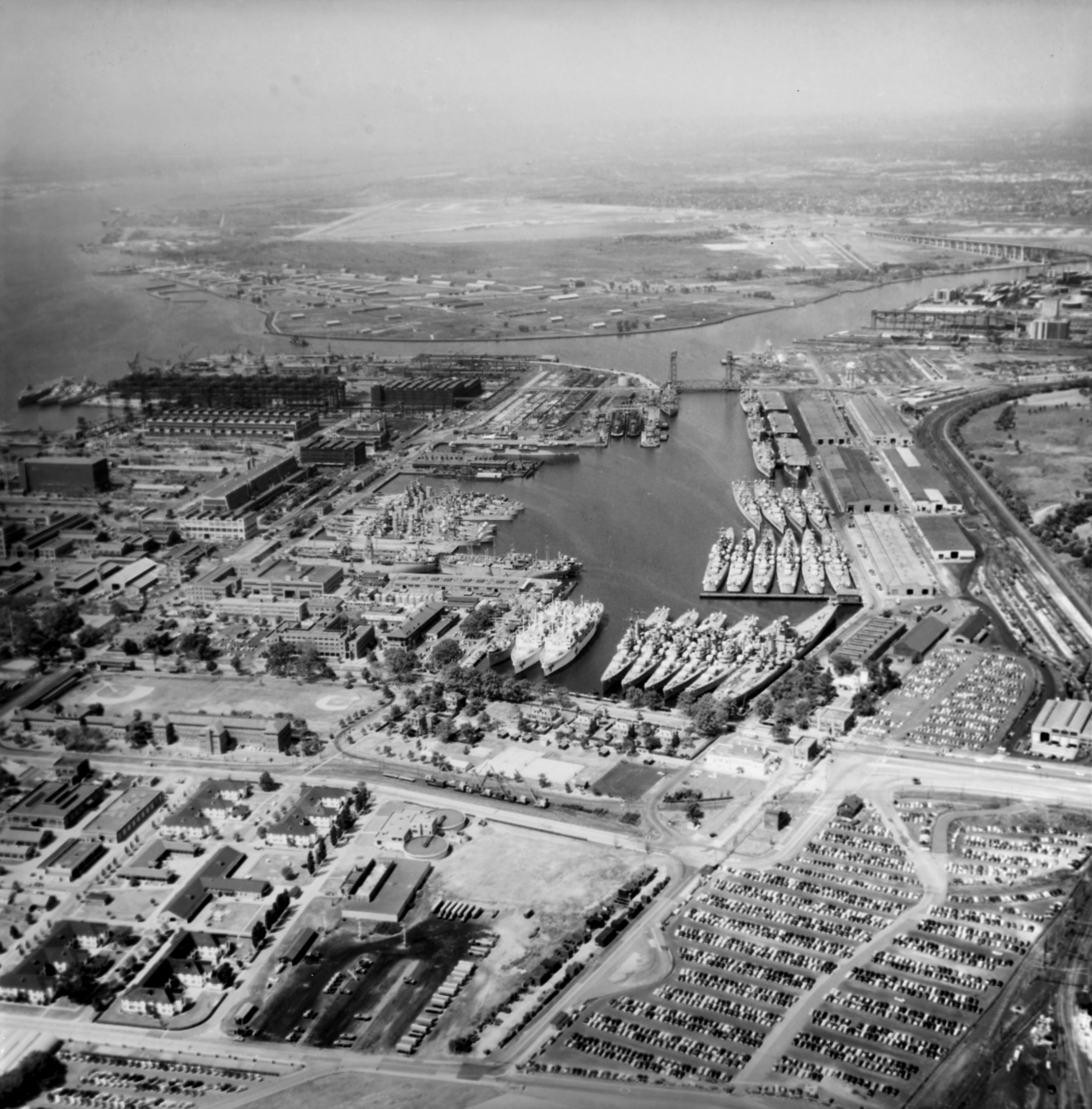
- An aerial view of the Philadelphia Naval Shipyard in 1955

Site information
- Type: Shipyard
- Controlled by: United States Navy

Site history
- Built: 1871 (League Island Facility)
- In use: 1801–1995
- Battles/wars
- Philadelphia Naval Shipyard Historic District
- U.S. National Register of Historic Places
- U.S. Historic district
- Location within Philadelphia Location within Pennsylvania Location within the United States
- Location: South Broad Street; Philadelphia, Pennsylvania, U.S.
- Coordinates: 39°53′28″N 75°10′43″W
- Area: 1,200 acres (490 ha)
- Built: 1876
- Architect: Robert E. Peary; Karcher & Smith
- Architectural style: Modern Movement, Late Victorian
- NRHP reference No.: 99001579
- Added to NRHP: 22 December 1999
- Commandant's Quarters
- U.S. National Register of Historic Places
- U.S. Historic district – Contributing property
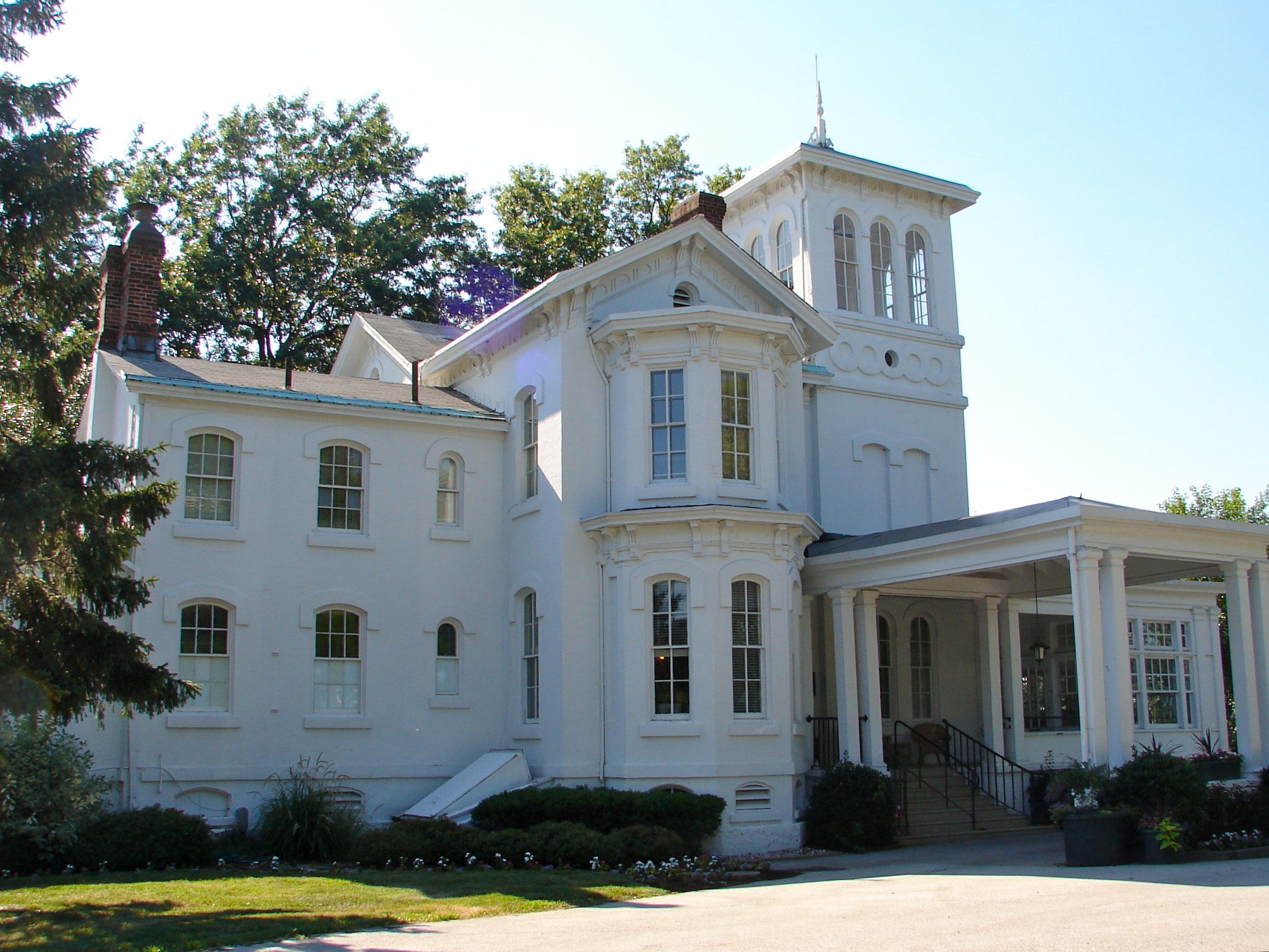

- Location within Philadelphia Location within Pennsylvania Location within the United States
- Location: Philadelphia, Pennsylvania
- Built: 1874
- Architect: US Department of the Navy
- Architectural style: Italian Villa
- NRHP reference No.: 76001661
- Added to NRHP: 3 June 1976

The Philadelphia Naval Shipyard was a United States Navy shipyard in Philadelphia, Pennsylvania. Founded as a commercial operation in 1776, it became the Navy's first yard in 1801, and was historically important for nearly two centuries.

Construction of the original Philadelphia Naval Shipyard began during the American Revolution at Front and Federal Streets in what is now the Pennsport section of Philadelphia. In 1871, it was replaced by a new, much larger yard developed around facilities on League Island, at the confluence of the Delaware and Schuylkill rivers. The Navy yard expansion stimulated the development over time of residences and businesses in South Philadelphia, where many shipyard workers lived. During World War II, some 40,000 workers operated on shifts around the clock to produce and repair ships at the yard for the war effort.

The U.S. Navy ended most of its activities at the shipyard in the 1990s, closing the base after recommendations by the Base Realignment and Closure commission. In 2000, the Philadelphia Industrial Development Corporation, on behalf of the City of Philadelphia, acquired it and began to redevelop the land. First called Philadelphia Naval Business Center, it is now known as The Navy Yard. It is a large mixed-use campus where nearly 15,000 people are employed by more than 120 companies representing a mix of industries, including cell therapy production facilities, global fashion companies, and a commercial shipyard. The U.S. Navy still operates a Naval Inactive Ship Maintenance Facility and a few engineering activities at the site.

== History ==
=== 18th and 19th centuries ===
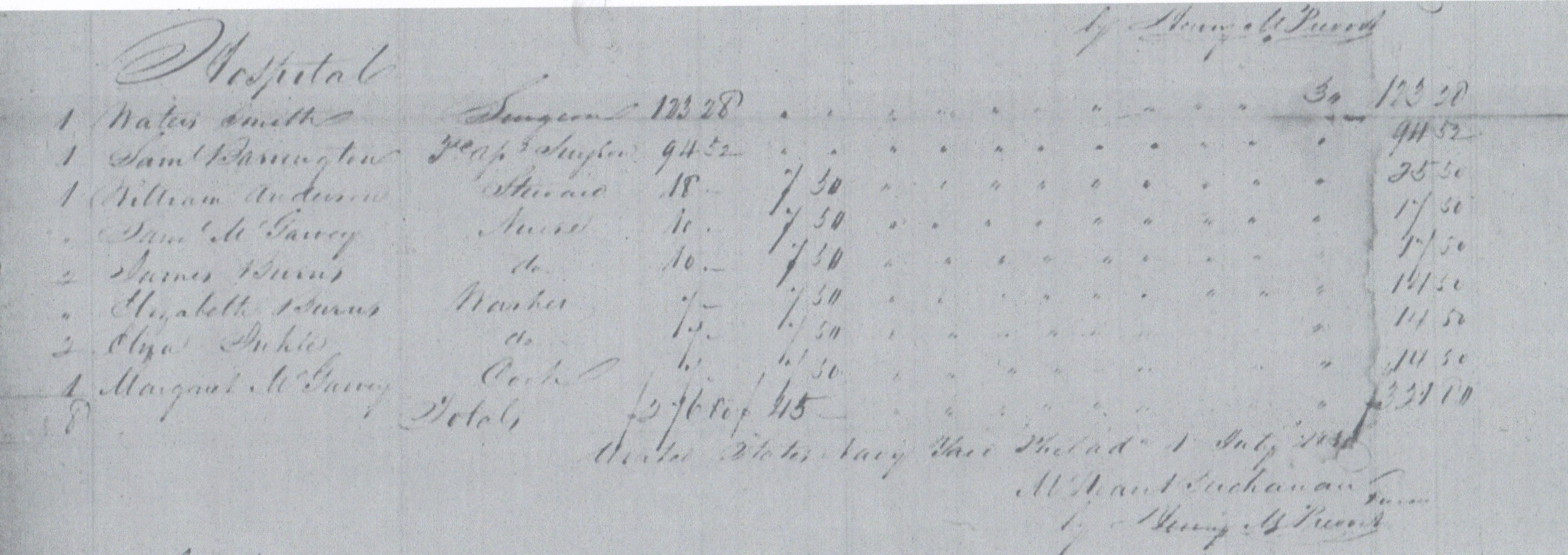
A list of Philadelphia Naval Hospital staff at Philadelphia Navy Yard on 1 July 1835

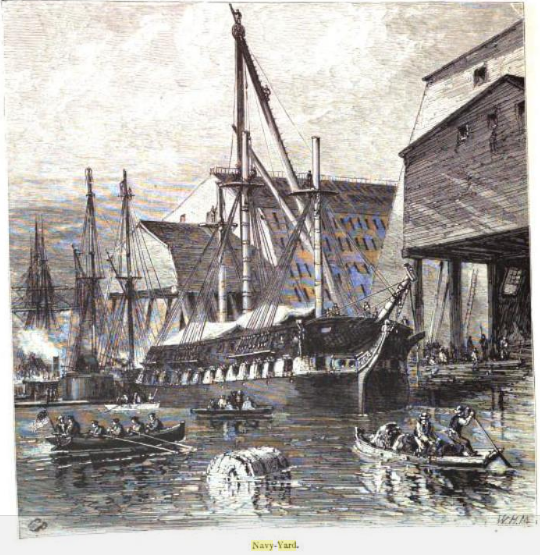
An illustration of Philadelphia Naval Shipyard in 1874

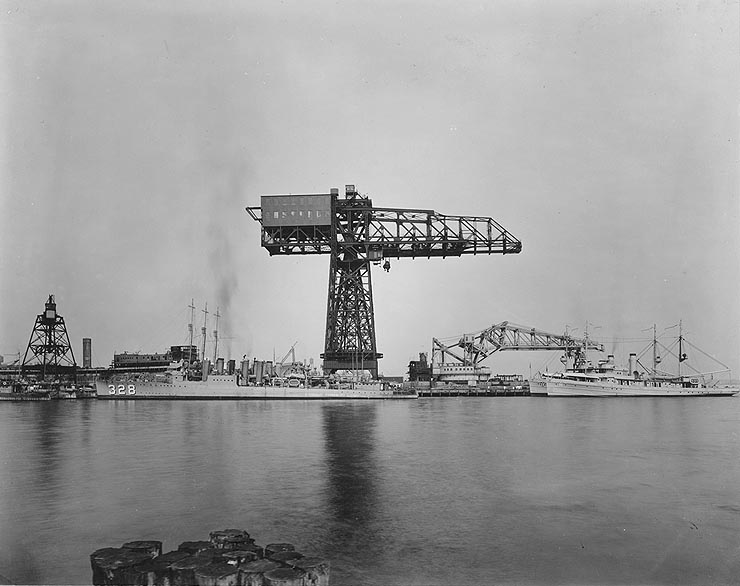
The League Island Crane with the destroyer USS Lamson in the foreground in May 1923

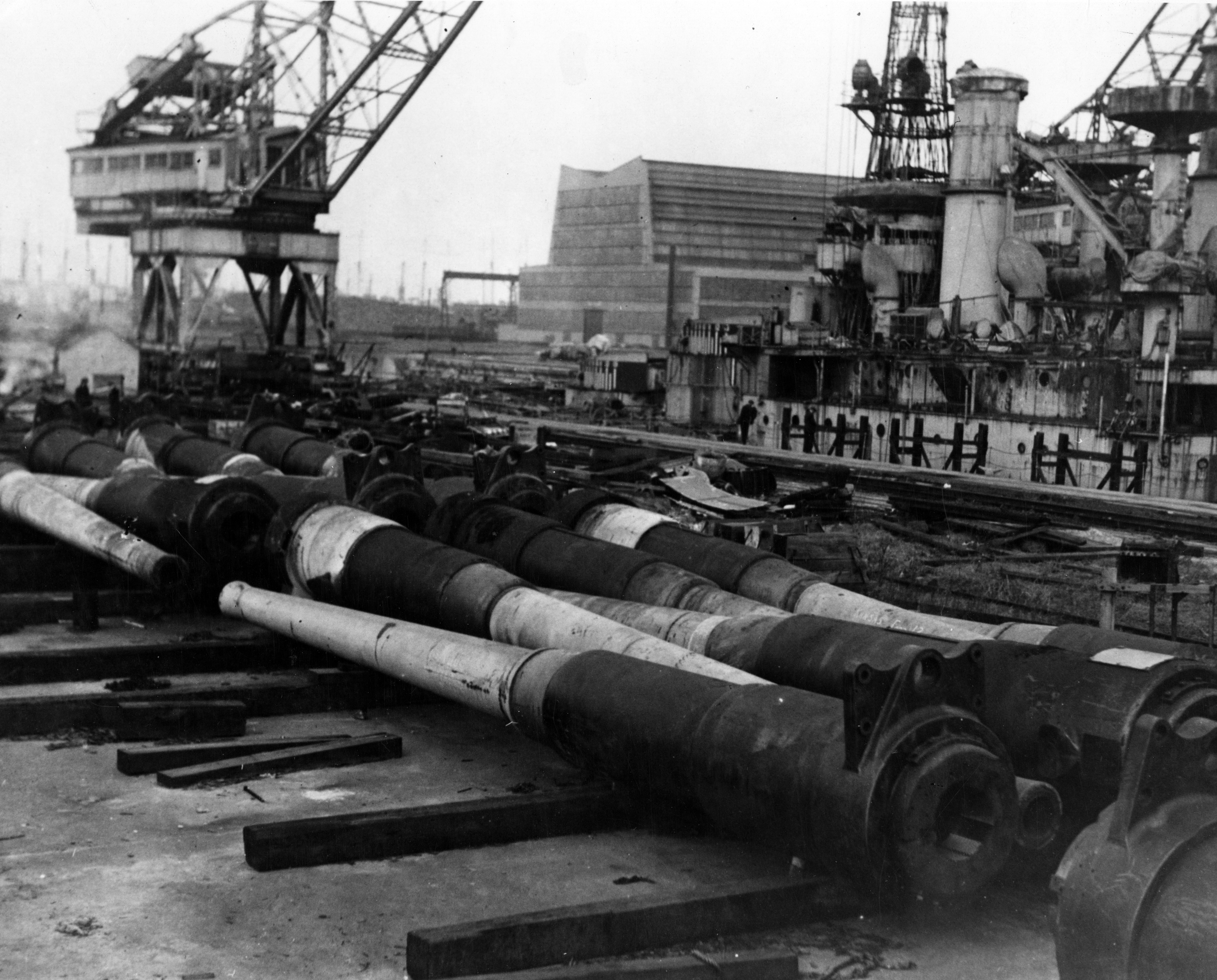
Guns from battleships being scrapped in Philadelphia Navy yard and the USS South Carolina being dismantled in the background in December 1923

The yard has its origins in a commercial shipyard founded in 1776 on Philadelphia's Front Street on the Delaware River; it was designated an official United States Navy site in 1801.

From 1812 until 1865, it was a large shipbuilding center. The first ship launched was the USS Franklin in 1815, watched by more than 50,000 spectators. The rapid development of other shipbuilding companies pledged Philadelphia to improve production processes. This was the first shipyard in the world to use floating dry docks in the building process to improve operating time of the ships.

After the advent of ironclad warships made the site obsolete, new facilities were built in 1871 on League Island at the confluence of the Delaware and Schuylkill rivers.

Beginning in the early 19th century, many Philadelphia workers agitated for a reduction in the arduous twelve-hour workday. Prior to 1835, the workday was sunrise to sunset, with time off for breakfast. In the summer of 1835 Yard shipwrights, joiners and other workers led the effort to reduce the workday by combining the direct action of a strike with political pressure to the Executive Branch of the Federal government. After first seeking workday reduction by a request to the Secretary of the Navy via shipyard Commandant Commodore James Barron, on 29 August 1835, workers appealed directly to President Andrew Jackson. Commodore Barron endorsed the request: "I would respectfully observe – Seems to be inevitable, sooner or later, for as the working man are seconded by all the Master workmen, city councils etc. there is no probability they will secede from their demands."

Their petition was granted and on 31 August 1835 the president ordered the Secretary to grant the ten-hour work day, effective 3 September 1835. However, the change was applicable only to the Philadelphia Navy yard. On 29 August 1836, a committee of Philadelphia Navy yard mechanics appealed to President Andrew Jackson to extend the law,

"The Committee are sure that if the example is set in Philadelphia it will be [illegible] required in other places and they will not attempt to disguise the pleasure it would give them as Citizens and as Workingmen to see a reformation taking place under the auspices of the Government."

It was five years before the ten-hour day was extended to all government employees engaged in manual labor; this was accomplished via an executive order by President Martin Van Buren on 31 March 1840.

=== 20th century ===
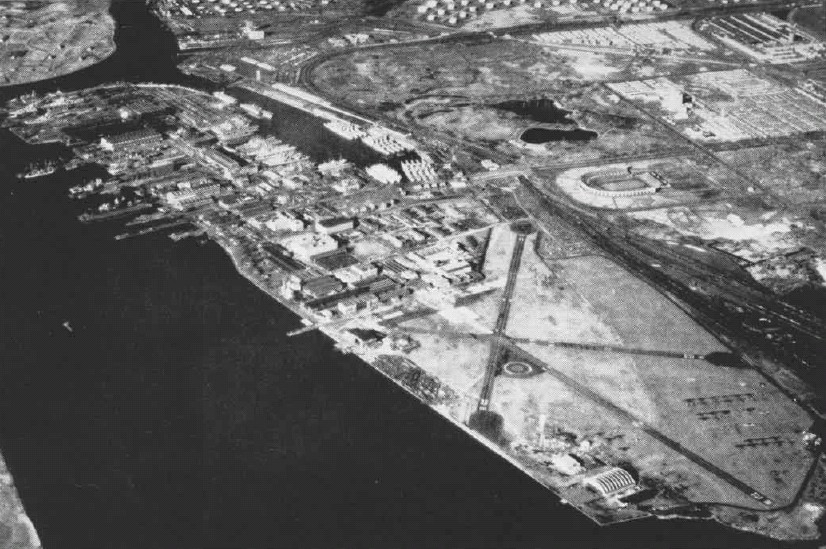
An aerial view of Mustin Field and the shipyard with Philadelphia Municipal Stadium visible behind the runways in September 1948

The Naval Aircraft Factory was established at the League Island site in 1917. Just after of the end World War I, a 350-ton capacity hammerhead crane was ordered for the yard. Manufactured in 1919 by the McMyler-Interstate Company in Bedford, Ohio, it was the world's largest crane, and referred to as the League Island Crane by its builder. Weighing 3,500 tons, the crane was shipped to the yard in sections, and remained for many years the Navy's largest.

Mustin Field opened at the Naval Aircraft Factory in 1926 and operated until 1963.

The shipyard's greatest period came in World War II, when the yard employed 40,000 people, built 53 ships, and repaired 574. During this period, the yard built the 45,000-ton battleship New Jersey and its sister ship, Wisconsin. In the Naval Laboratory, Philip Abelson developed the liquid thermal diffusion technique for separating uranium-235 for the Manhattan Project.

The memorial chapel to the Four Chaplains is located on the grounds.

After World War II, the workforce dropped to 12,000, as the Navy stabilized its fleet. In the 1960s, the Navy began to contract with private companies to construct new ships. The yard built its last new ship, the command ship Blue Ridge, in 1970.

Because of foreign competition and reduced needs due to the end of the Cold War, the defense Base Realignment and Closure Commission recommended closure of the yard in 1991. The city and state struggled to keep the facility operational, and the planned closing was unsuccessfully litigated to the US Supreme Court in Dalton v. Specter. When the yard finally closed in 1995, it cost the region 7,000 jobs. This followed years in which the region had lost industrial jobs to restructuring and movement of manufacturing overseas. US Senator Arlen Specter charged that the Department of Defense did not disclose the official report on the closing. This resulted in a controversy that led to further legal disputes, but no actions.

Since its transfer from the government to the City of Philadelphia, the west end of property has been leased to Aker Kværner, a Norwegian tanker and commercial shipbuilding firm.

== Dry docks and slipways ==
Dock No.	Material of which dock is constructed	Length	Width	Depth	Date Completed	Source
1	Concrete	442 feet (135 m)	94 feet 6 inches (28.80 m)	27 feet 7 inches (8.41 m)	1956 (reconstructed)	
2	Concrete	744 feet 7 inches (226.95 m)	140 feet 3 inches (42.75 m)	30 feet (9.1 m)	1908	
3	Concrete	1,011 feet 4 inches (308.25 m)	144 feet (44 m)	43 feet 5 inches (13.23 m)	1921	
4	Concrete	1,092 feet (333 m)	150 feet (46 m)	40 feet (12 m)	1942	
5	Concrete	1,092 feet 6 inches (332.99 m)	150 feet (46 m)	43 feet 6 inches (13.26 m)	1943	

1 January 1946
Shipbuilding ways	Width	Length	Source
1	104 feet (32 m)	436 feet (133 m)	
2	130 feet (40 m)	928 feet (283 m)	
3	130 feet (40 m)	928 feet (283 m)	

== Notable ships ==
- Franklin, a 74-gun ship of the line launched in 1815, the first vessel laid down at the shipyard. It was started as part of the United States' massive construction program of ships for the War of 1812.
- New Jersey, an Iowa-class battleship used in World War II and later decades.
- Wisconsin, the last keel laid for a completed battleship of the United States Navy, 25 January 1941.
- Blue Ridge, an amphibious command ship. This was the last vessel built at the shipyard. It now flies the First Navy Jack as the service's oldest actively deployed vessel.
- Aircraft Carriers
  - 3 of 24 Essex-class
    - Antietam
    - Princeton
    - Valley Forge
- Battleships
  - 1 of 2 North Carolina-class
    - Washington
  - 2 of 4 Iowa-class
    - New Jersey
    - Wisconsin
- Heavy cruisers
  - 1 of 7 New Orleans-class
    - Minneapolis
  - Wichita
  - 2 of 14 Baltimore-class
    - Los Angeles
    - Chicago
- Light cruisers
  - 1 of 9 Brooklyn-class
    - Philadelphia
- Destroyers
  - 2 of 18 Mahan-class
    - Cassin
    - Shaw
  - 1 of 10 Benham-class
    - Rhind
  - 1 of 12 Sims-class
    - Buck
  - 2 of 66 Gleaves-class
    - Butler
    - Gherardi
- Destroyer escorts
  - 5 of 65 Evarts-class
  - 1 of 32 Evarts converted to Captain-class frigates
    - HMS Drury (K316)
  - 10 of 148 Buckley-class
  - 2 of 22 Rudderow-class
  - 4 of 50 Rudderow-class destroyer escorts completed as Crosley-class high speed transport
- APD conversions Buckley-class destroyer escort -> Charles Lawrence-class high speed transport
  - Amesbury (DE-66)
  - Reeves (DE-156)
  - Hayter (DE-212)
  - Laning (DE-159)
  - Barber (DE-161)
  - Lloyd (DE-209)
  - Bowers (DE-637)
  - Weber (DE-675)

== Atlantic Reserve Fleet, Philadelphia ==
The Atlantic Reserve Fleet, Philadelphia "mothballed" ships and submarines. Part of the United States Navy reserve fleets, it opened at the Philadelphia Naval Shipyard in 1946 to store the many surplus ships after World War II. Many of the ships in the fleet were reactivated for the Korean War and some for the Vietnam War.

The control of the reserve fleet was later transferred to the Naval Inactive Ship Maintenance Facility (NISMF).

The USS Chandeleur (AV-10) was used as a barracks ship for the crew at the Atlantic Reserve Fleet, Philadelphia.

== League Island after the naval shipyard ==
The City of Philadelphia became the landlord and owner of the League Island site in March 2000, when the Philadelphia Authority for Industrial Development (PAID) took title to roughly 1,000 acres from the Navy. Today, the site is operated as a mixed-use industrial park under the name "The Navy Yard". The Philadelphia Industrial Development Corporation (PIDC) manages the planning, operation, and development of The Navy Yard on behalf of PAID and the City of Philadelphia; its offices are now located at The Navy Yard.

A comprehensive master plan was completed in 2004 to redeveloped the former industrial yard to a mixed-use campus. It proposed adaptive reuse of some Navy buildings as office space; maintenance of buildings and campus elements with strong historic interest, such as the Navy Yard Marine Parade Grounds; and construction of new buildings for offices and other purposes as needed for new tenants. This construction has been in the section called the Corporate Center.

As of 2010, US Navy activities include Naval Support Activity Philadelphia, the Naval Surface Warfare Center Ship Systems Engineering Station, Naval Facilities Engineering Command Mid-Atlantic Public Works Department Pennsylvania (NAVFAC MIDLANT PWD PA), and the Naval Inactive Ship Maintenance Facility (NISMF). This last stores decommissioned and mothballed warships and auxiliary naval vessels.

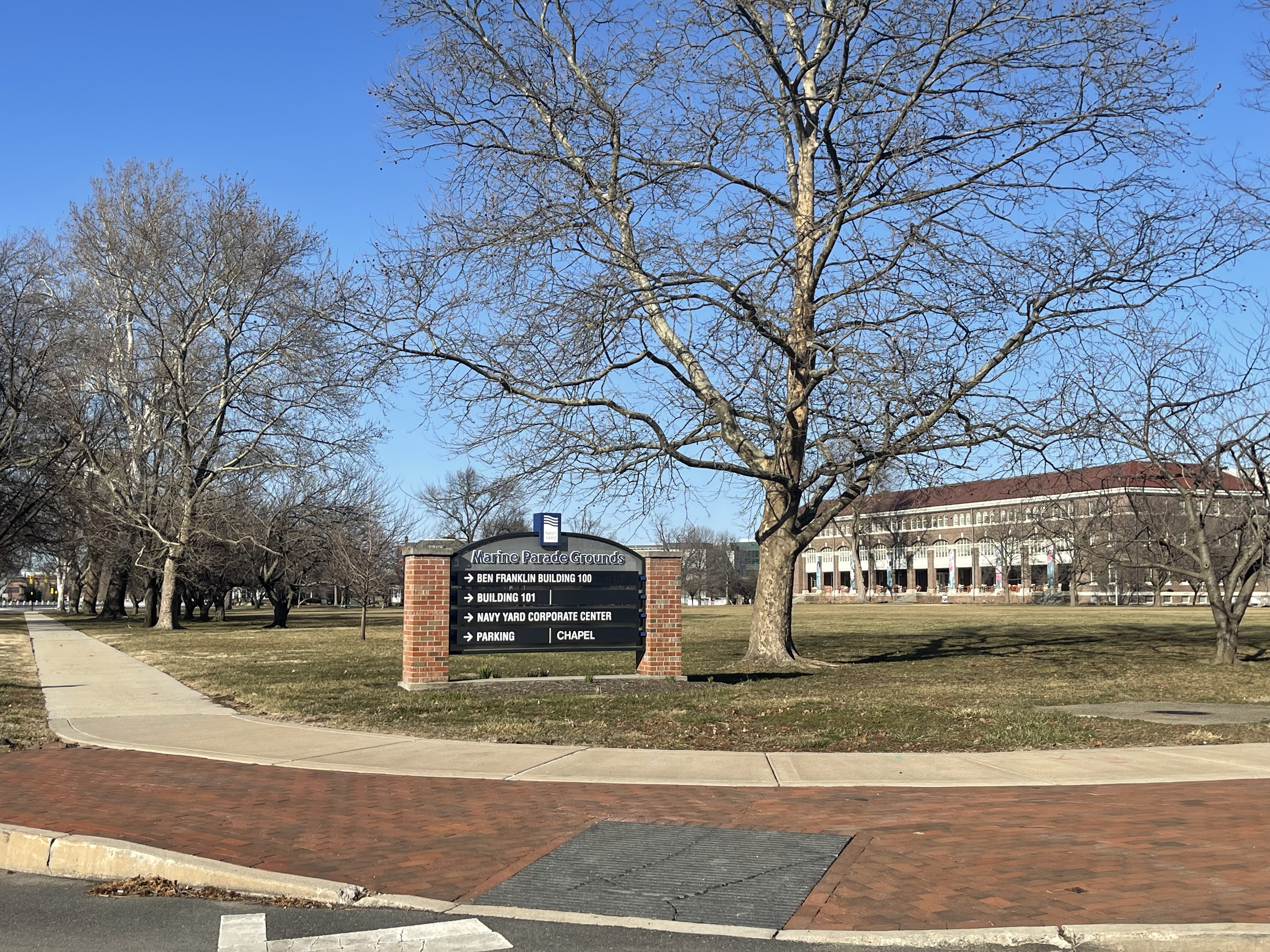
Navy Yard parade grounds in 2024

The Navy Yard is now the site of 120 companies with 10,000 employees. New businesses continue to be attracted to the campus, and existing ones expand. Clothing retailer and manufacturer Urban Outfitters consolidated its Philadelphia headquarters on the site. Tasty Baking Company, makers of Tastykakes, has moved their bakery to the 26th Street side of The Yard. Other occupants include Rittenhouse Ventures, Hanwha Philly Shipyard, and Rhoads Industries Inc., in Navy Building 57, Energy Efficient Buildings Hub (EEB Hub), RevZilla.com, and Mark Group, Inc.

In January 2013, PIDC announced its intention to increase the number of apartments on site for employees (near 1,000) and additional infrastructure development. This is made possible by the public financing of shipyards and investments of private companies. According to the plan for 2013, the number of employees at the shipyard amount to around 30,000 people.

In March 2013, the Canadian Pacific – Bulkmatic Transport transload site on Langley Ave was closed.

The Athletic Base Ball Club of Philadelphia hosts the annual Philadelphia Base Ball Fair & Exhibition at the Navy Yard Marine Parade Grounds.

== See also ==
- League Island
- Commandant's Quarters (Philadelphia, Pennsylvania)
- Marine Barracks (Philadelphia, Pennsylvania)
- Port of Philadelphia, located immediately to the northeast along the Delaware River
- Philadelphia International Airport, located immediately to the southwest along the Delaware River

== Bibliography ==
- Wright, Christopher C. (June 2021). "Question 1/58: Concerning Cement Backing for Armor on Montana (BB-67) Class Battleships". Warship International. LVIII (2): 118–120. ISSN 0043-0374.
