= Athletic Base Ball Club of Philadelphia =

Vintage base ball team

Coordinates: 39.9760°N 75.20578°W

Information
- League: Mid-Atlantic Vintage Base Ball League (Eastern Division)
- Location: Philadelphia, PA
- Ballpark: "Athletic Field", behind the Please Touch Museum at 41st and Landsdowne and Avenue of the Republic, Philadelphia, PA 19131
- Founded: 2009
- Nickname(s): Athletics, A's
- Ownership: Not for profit organization
- Management: Steven "Loveseat" Couch (Captain); Matt "Metal" Walsh (Vice-Captain); Ryan "Hurleigh" Berley (Vice President Quartermaster); Dan "LP" Martino (Interim Vice President of Operations); Scott "Big Deal" Alberts (treasurer); Tim "Toots" Rinehart (secretary); Jamie "Mouth" Ford (Match Secretary); Greg "Southwark" Stoloski (field manager); Scott "Big Deal" Alberts (Umpire); Tim "Toots" Rinehart (Umpire); Stephen "Flame" Workman (Umpire)
- President: Dan "Victory" Gordon

Athletic Base Ball Club of Philadelphia is a vintage base ball team based in Philadelphia, which plays by 1864 National Association Rules. Athletic is a member of the Mid Atlantic Vintage Base Ball League, competing in the Eastern Division. The club made its debut on the diamond in April 2010 and plays many of its home matches at Memorial Hall in Fairmount Park, located in the West Philadelphia section of the city.

== Inspiration ==
The original Athletic Base Ball Club was founded in 1859 when several members of the Handel & Haydn Society (a singing club) came together with the express purpose of playing “the New York game." They would go on to dominate amateur play in Philadelphia through the early and mid-1860s. The team went professional in the late 1860s and helped establish the National Association of Professional Base Ball Players, winning the first pennant in 1871. Athletic went on to be a charter member in the National League until being ejected after the 1876 season. They played one more independent season in 1877. During the period 1878-1880, top-level Philadelphia ballplayers would form a series of minor independent Athletic clubs. The name Athletic was then adopted by three subsequent major league teams, including two American Association teams in Philadelphia, and the current Oakland Athletics of the American League.

Athletic’s uniforms are based on descriptions in The Book of American Pastimes by Charles Peverelly, and images in Harper’s Weekly.

The team was founded by Philadelphia native Scott Alberts. He came to learn about vintage base ball clubs playing on the East Coast from a magazine article and found that Philadelphia did not have its own club. Alberts founded the Athletic Base Ball Club of Philadelphia in October 2009, with assistance from Ryan & Eric Berley, ice cream purveyors in Old City in Philadelphia, and members of the Society for American Baseball Research.

== Philadelphia Base Ball Fair & Exhibition ==
Athletic hosts a biennial Philadelphia Base Ball Fair & Exhibition at the Naval Yard Marine Parade Ground. The inaugural event in August 2011 drew twelve MAVBBL teams.

== Seasons & Records ==
2016 Season: 11-20 Captain: Steve "Loveseat" Couch

2015 Season: 7-23 Captain: Steve "Loveseat" Couch

2014 Season: 6-17

Captain: T. James "Mouth" Ford Vice Captain: Tim "Ironsides" Sweeney

2013 Season: 6-32

Captain: T. James "Mouth" Ford Vice Captain: Steven "Love Seat" Couch

2012 Season: 4-24

Captain: T. James "Mouth" Ford

2011 Season: 3-29

Co-Captains: David "Sticky" Frank & Steven "Love Seat" Couch

2010 Season: 1-12

Captain President: Scott "Smooth Bore" Alberts

2009 Season: Founding. No matches played. One practice/scrimmage with the Diamond State BBC of Delaware.
