= Commandant's Quarters (Philadelphia, Pennsylvania) =

Historic house in Pennsylvania, United States

- U.S. National Register of Historic Places
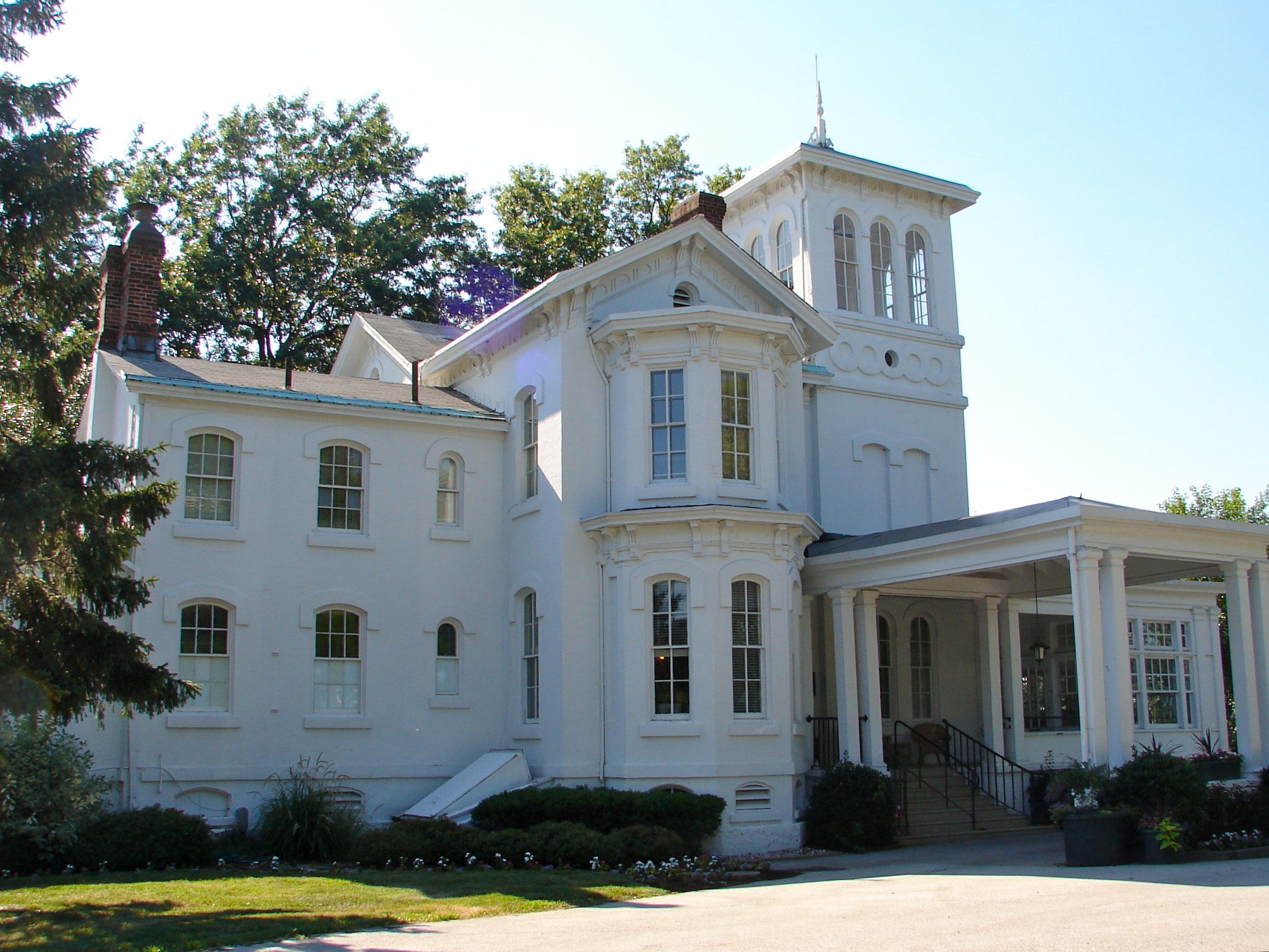
- Commandant's Quarters, June 2010

- Location within Philadelphia Location within Pennsylvania Location within the United States
- Location: U.S. Naval Base, Philadelphia, Pennsylvania
- Coordinates: 39°53′48″N 75°10′38″W
- Area: 0.2 acres (0.081 ha)
- Built: 1874-1875, 1901
- Built by: U.S. Department of the Navy
- Architectural style: Italian Villa
- NRHP reference No.: 76001661
- Added to NRHP: June 3, 1976

Commandant's Quarters, also known as Quarters "A", is a historic home located at the Philadelphia Naval Shipyard, Philadelphia, Pennsylvania. It was built in 1874–1875, and is a three-story, painted brick dwelling in the Italian Villa-style. A porch was added in 1901. It features an off-center square tower, slate covered gable roof, bracketed waves, and a bay window. It was an officer's residence until June 1960.

It was added to the National Register of Historic Places in 1976.

On November 1, 2021, as part of National Homeless Awareness Month, Philadelphia mayor Jim Kenney urged that the Biden Administration convert the Commandant's Quarters into a homeless shelter. On November 26, 2021, President Biden announced that he approved of the mayor's initiative. On December 20, 2021, the proposal was introduced in the House of Representatives by Rep. Dwight Evans (D-PA) and in the Senate by Sen. Bob Casey, Jr., and enjoys the support of the Congressional Progressive Caucus.
