= Commandant's Office, Washington Navy Yard =

Historic house in Washington, D.C., United States

- U.S. National Register of Historic Places
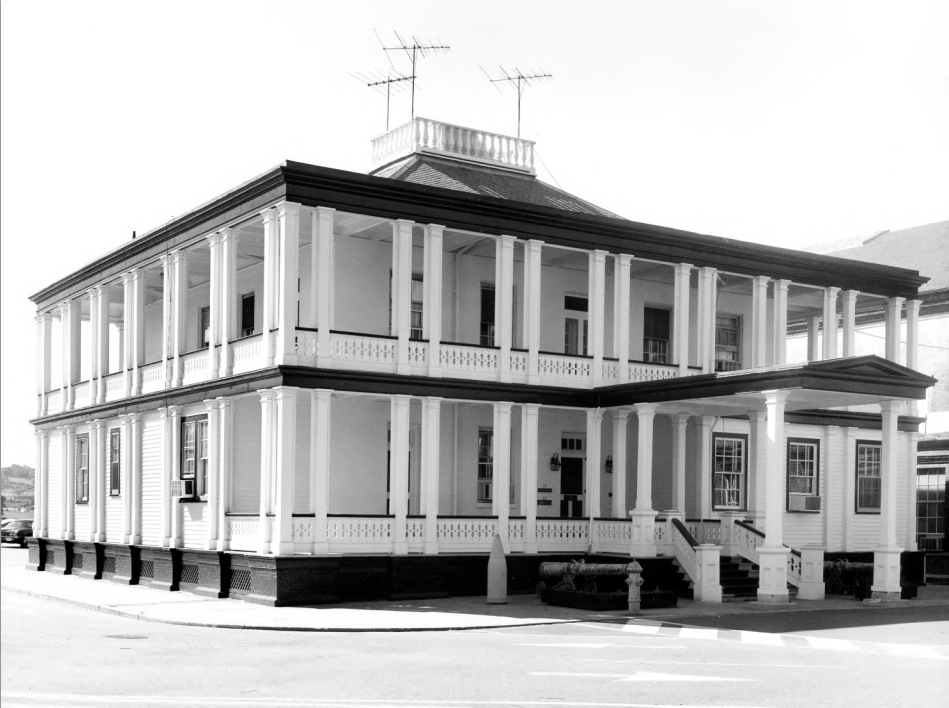
- View from the north, 1972

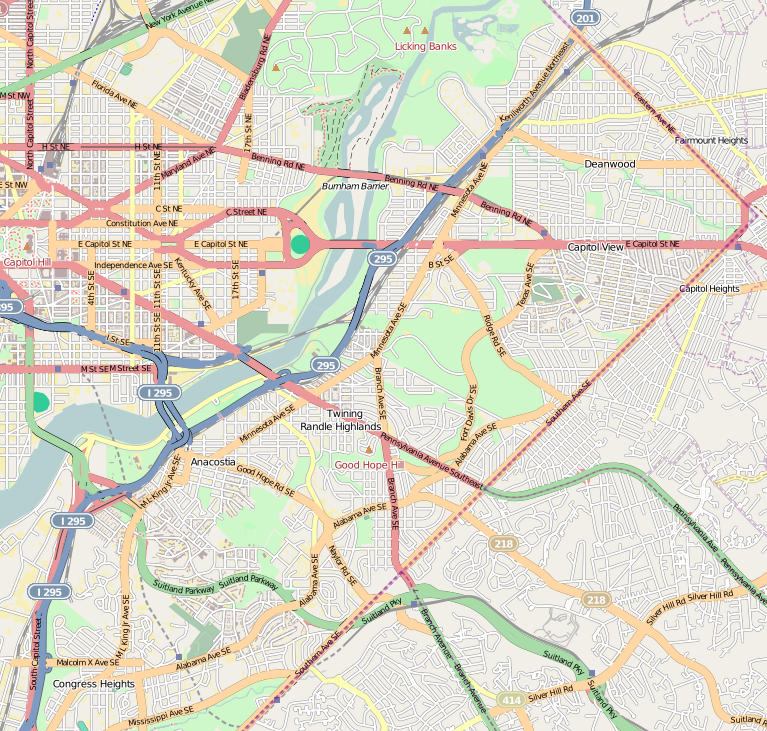
- Location within Washington, D.C. Location within the District of Columbia Location within the United States
- Location: Montgomery Sq. and Dahlgren Ave., SE., Washington, District of Columbia
- Coordinates: 38°52′23″N 76°59′43″W
- Area: less than one acre
- Built: 1837
- NRHP reference No.: 73002077
- Added to NRHP: August 14, 1973

The Commandant's Office in the Washington Navy Yard, also known as Building One, Quarters J, or the Middendorf Building is the U.S. Navy's oldest active office building, which historically housed the offices of the Commandant and other officers of the Washington Navy Yard in Washington, D.C. It sits at the south end of Dahlgren Avenue, the Yard's main road, two blocks south of the Latrobe Gate near the Anacostia River. After a renovation in 1993, it became offices for the Naval Historical Center. Since 2005, the building has been restored to its historical use as the office of the Commandant. It was likely built from 1837 to 1838 and first appeared on a Yard map in 1842. In 1973 it was listed on the National Register of Historic Places.

== History ==
A building for officers' use at the Yard was first proposed in 1828 and is shown on an 1842 map. Though clear records of the construction have not been found, proposed improvements of $2,500 in 1837 and $2,000 in 1838 were made for a "Building for officers."

George Watterson described the building in 1842 in his New Guide to Washington as "a neat and beautiful building of brick, two-stories high, with verandas running all around it, has lately been erected as offices, for the officers and others doing business in this establishment." A trophy park just south of the building "consisted of a semi-circle of captured Naval cannons graduated from the center by size with other guns and stacks of round shot placed between this semi-circle and the office." The park was built before 1842 and eliminated about 1945.

Commandant John Adolphus Dahlgren, who was given command of the Yard just before the Civil War, gave up the Commandant's House where he had lived, for the use of the officers of the 71st New York Regiment. He then slept and dined in the room across from his office in Building One. President Abraham Lincoln often visited Dahlgren at his offices, stating, "I like to see Dahlgren. The drive to the Navy Yard is one of my greatest pleasures. When I am depressed, I like to talk with Dahlgren. I learn something of the preparations for defense, and I get from him consolation and courage."

In 1873, the building was renovated and expanded. In 1941, it became a post office and communications center. In 1948, it was remodeled to serve as officer quarters and renamed Quarters J. In 1976 the building became the Yard's visitors center and housed the Navy Sea Cadets. It returned to use as offices after a 1993 renovation. In 2005, it was restored as the Office of the Commandant of Naval District Washington.

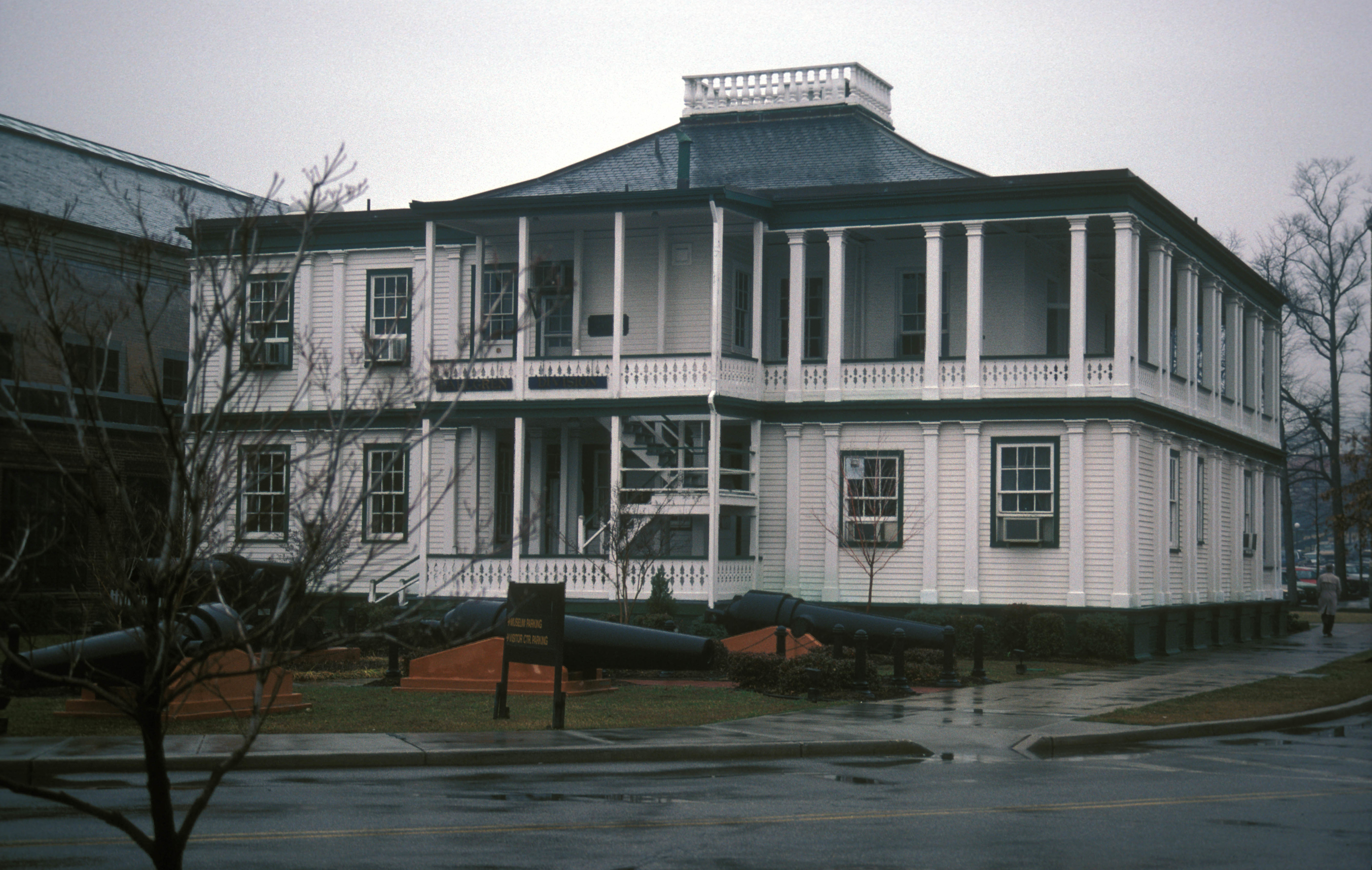
After 1972
