= List of crossings of the Schuylkill River =

This is a list of bridges and other crossings of the Schuylkill River, from the Delaware River upstream to the source. All locations are in Pennsylvania and Historic American Buildings Survey (HABS) and Historic American Engineering Record (HAER) survey numbers are noted where available.

== Crossings ==
| Images | Crossing | Carries | Opened | Location | Notes |
=== Philadelphia ===
| | Girard Point Bridge | I-95 | 1973 | Mud Island, Southwest Philadelphia and South Philadelphia; 39°53′32″N 75°11′50″W | Double-deck bridge; upper deck southbound |
| | George C. Platt Bridge | PA 291 (Penrose Avenue) | 1949 | 39°53′53″N 75°12′42″W | Through truss bridge |
| | Passyunk Avenue Bridge | Passyunk Avenue | 1983 | 39°55′11″N 75°12′07″W | Double-leaf bascule bridge |
| | B&O Railroad Bridge | CSX Philadelphia Subdivision | 1910 | 39°56′08″N 75°12′21″W | Swing bridge |
| | Schuylkill Crossing Swing Bridge | Schuylkill River Trail | 2026 | 39.9406484°N 75.2050106°W | |
| | Grays Ferry Avenue Bridge | Grays Ferry Avenue | 1976 | 39°56′28″N 75°12′18″W | |
| | University Avenue Bridge | University Avenue | 1930 | 39°56′34″N 75°11′49″W | Double-leaf bascule bridge |
| | Schuylkill Expressway Bridge | I-76 (Schuylkill Expressway) | 1956 | 39°56′31″N 75°11′38″W | |
| | Schuylkill Arsenal Railroad Bridge | CSX Harrisburg Subdivision | 1886 | 39°56′36″N 75°11′30″W | Swing bridge (immobilized) |
| | PECO utility tunnel | Electric and steam utility lines | | 39°56′37″N 75°11′29″W | |
| | South Street Bridge | South Street | 2010 | 39°56′49″N 75°11′13″W | Opened November 6, 2010 |
| | Walnut Street Bridge | Walnut Street | 1991 | 39°57′06″N 75°10′54″W | |
| | Chestnut Street Bridge | Chestnut Street | 1957 | 39°57′11″N 75°10′52″W | |
| | Market Street Bridge | PA 3 (Market Street) | 1932 | 39°57′16″N 75°10′49″W | |
| | "Market Street Elevated" Bridge (demolished in 1956) | | 1947-1955 | 39°57′16″N 75°10′49″W | Replaced by the Schuylkill River rapid transit tunnel |
| | Schuylkill River rapid transit tunnel | SEPTA Metro | 1955 | 39°57′16″N 75°10′49″W | Replaced the "Market Street Elevated" Bridge in 1955 |
| | John F. Kennedy Boulevard Bridge | PA 3 (John F. Kennedy Boulevard) | 1959 | 39°57′20″N 75°10′48″W | |
| | SEPTA Regional Rail bridge | SEPTA Regional Rail (All lines) | | 39°57′22″N 75°10′47″W | |
| | Vine Street Expressway Bridge | I-676 / US 30 (Vine Street Expressway) | 1959 | 39°57′36″N 75°10′48″W | |
| | Spring Garden Street Bridge | Spring Garden Street | 1965 | 39°57′51″N 75°11′01″W | Originally the Colossus Bridge |
| | MLK Drive Bridge | Martin Luther King, Jr. (formerly West River) Drive | 1966 | 39°57′52″N 75°11′02″W | Passes underneath Spring Garden Street Bridge at center of both bridges |
| | Fairmount Water Works Dam | | 1928 | 39°58′02″N 75°11′11″W | |
| | Girard Avenue Bridge | SEPTA Metro US 13 (Girard Avenue) | 1972 | 39°58′31″N 75°11′36″W | HABS PA-1657 |
| | Pennsylvania Railroad, Connecting Railway Bridge | Trenton Line; Chestnut Hill West Line; Northeast Corridor; Atlantic City Line | 1867 | 39°58′35″N 75°11′38″W | HAER PA-37, HABS PA-6213 |
| | Columbia Railroad Bridge | CSX Trenton Subdivision | 1920 | 39°59′06″N 75°12′14″W | |
| | Strawberry Mansion Bridge | Strawberry Drive | 1897 | 39°59′43″N 75°11′38″W | HAER PA-92, HABS PA-1669 |
| | Philadelphia and Reading Railroad, Bridge at West Falls | CSX Trenton Subdivision | 1890 | 40°00′23″N 75°11′33″W | Wrought iron plate girder; HAER PA-553 |
| | Philadelphia and Reading Railroad Schuylkill River Viaduct | CSX Trenton Subdivision | 1856 | 40°00′21″N 75°11′32″W | Stone arch; HAER PA-39 |
| | Twin Bridges | US 1 (Roosevelt Expressway) | 1960 | 40°00′24″N 75°11′35″W | |
| | Falls Bridge | Calumet Street | 1895 | 40°00′30″N 75°11′51″W | HAER PA-35 |
| | City Avenue Bridges | City Avenue | 1955 | 40°00′42″N 75°12′21″W | |
=== Montgomery County–Philadelphia ===
| | Pencoyd Bridge | Rail bridge converted to road bridge | 1900 | Bala Cynwyd and Manayunk; 40°01′00″N 75°12′48″W | Former PRR industrial spur serving Pencoyd Iron Works and local industries from Schuylkill Branch |
| | Philadelphia & Reading Railroad Mule Bridge | Norfolk Southern Venice Industrial Track | 1889 | Bala Cynwyd and Manayunk; 40°01′19″N 75°13′10″W | Former Reading, HAER PA-552 |
| | Manayunk Bridge (rail bridge converted to trail bridge) | Cynwyd Heritage Trail (formerly SEPTA Cynwyd Line to Manayunk) | 1918 | Bala Cynwyd and Manayunk; 40°01′31″N 75°13′35″W | Rail service abandoned 1986 (line truncated at Cynwyd), trail opened 2015, HAER PA-551 |
| | Green Lane Bridge | Green Lane | 1928 | West Manayunk and Manayunk; 40°01′34″N 75°13′41″W | |
| | Flat Rock Dam | | | Belmont Hills and Shawmont; 40°02′23″N 75°14′49″W | Mid-1970s concrete replacement of original crib and timber dam |
=== Montgomery County ===
| | Fayette Street Bridge (Matsonford Bridge) | Fayette Street | 1987 | West Conshohocken and Conshohocken; 40°04′14″N 75°18′34″W | |
| | Plymouth Dam (removed) | | | West Conshohocken and Connaughtown; 40°04′30″N 75°18′57″W | Breached; removed 2009; River Map and Water Trail Guide update |
| | Pearl Harbor Memorial Bridge | I-476 | | West Conshohocken and Connaughtown; 40°04′42″N 75°19′05″W | |
| | Upper Merion and Plymouth rail bridge | | | Swedeland and Ivy Rock; 40°05′26″N 75°19′17″W | Also used as private truck road |
| | Trenton Cutoff rail bridge | Norfolk Southern Railway Trenton Cutoff | 1915 | Swedesburg and Black Horse; 40°06′10″N 75°19′30″W | HAER PA-538 |
| | Schuylkill River Bridge | I-276 / Penna Turnpike | 1954 | Swedesburg and Black Horse; 40°06′11″N 75°19′30″W | |
| | DeKalb Veterans Memorial Bridge | US 202 (DeKalb Street) northbound | 1993 | Bridgeport and Norristown; 40°06′36″N 75°20′40″W | |
| | Bridgeport Bridge | SEPTA Metro | 1912 | Bridgeport and Norristown; 40°06′38″N 75°20′47″W | Former Philadelphia and Western Railroad, HAER PA-535 |
| | Norristown Dam | | | Bridgeport and Norristown; 40°06′38″N 75°20′49″W | |
| | Rail bridge | Norfolk Southern; Morrisville Connecting Track | | Bridgeport and Norristown via Barbadoes Island; 40°06′43″N 75°21′08″W | Crosses under Dannehower Bridge on north side of Barbadoes Island; former Reading passenger main line to Reading and Pottsville |
| | Dannehower Bridge | US 202 southbound | | Bridgeport and Norristown via Barbadoes Island; 40°06′42″N 75°21′01″W | Twin span |
| | Rail bridge | CSX Stony Creek Branch | | Barbadoes Island and Norristown; 40°06′28″N 75°21′03″W | Merges into Norfolk Southern Morrisville Connecting Track |
| | Haws Avenue bridge | | | Barbadoes Island and Norristown; 40°06′55″N 75°21′22″W | Barbadoes Island power plant access |
| | Schuylkill River Crossing Complex | US 422 | 2019 | Port Kennedy and Betzwood; 40°06′27″N 75°25′12″W | Previous bridge replaced with a new, five-span structure, 785 feet (239 m) long with a total width of 146 feet (45 m), to carry six lanes of traffic |
| | Sullivan's Bridge ([Old] Betzwood Bridge) | Former PA 363 (South Trooper Road) | 2016 | Port Kennedy and Betzwood; 40°06′27″N 75°25′14″W | Demolished in 1995, replacement pedestrian and bicycle bridge began construction May 2014 and opened August 19, 2016 |
=== Chester County–Montgomery County ===
| | Pawlings Road bridge | | 1987 | Phoenixville and Audubon; 40°06′53″N 75°28′14″W | |
| | Rail bridge | | | Valley Forge and Oaks; 40°07′29″N 75°27′41″W | Former Reading Perkiomen Branch, now part of Norfolk Southern Devault Secondary, currently inactive as a branch |
| | Dam | | | Island and Oaks; 40°07′44″N 75°28′17″W | |
| | Mont Clare Bridge | PA 29 (Bridge Street) | 1997 | Phoenixville and Mont Clare; 40°08′07″N 75°30′31″W | Formerly Gordon's, Starr's, or Jacob's ford |
| | Rail bridge | | | Phoenixville and Mont Clare; 40°08′15″N 75°30′36″W | Former PRR Schuylkill Branch, now Norfolk Southern Devault Secondary, currently out of service |
| | Black Rock Dam | | | Phoenixville and Mont Clare; 40°08′53″N 75°30′22″W | |
| | Black Rock Bridge | PA 113 (Black Rock Road) | 1916 | Phoenixville and Mingo; 40°09′32″N 75°30′43″W | |
| | Rail bridge | | | Black Rock Tunnel, Phoenixville and Upper Providence Township; 40°08′53″N 75°31′09″W | Former Reading main line, now Norfolk Southern Harrisburg Line |
| | Rail bridge | | | Cromby and Mingo; 40°09′37″N 75°31′37″W | Former Reading (currently Norfolk Southern) industrial spur serving Cromby Power Plant |
| | Road bridge | East Bridge Street | 1922 | Spring City and Royersford; 40°10′56″N 75°32′43″W | |
| | Rail bridge (abandoned) | | | Spring City and Royersford; 40°11′05″N 75°32′48″W | PRR industrial spur connecting Schuylkill Branch with industries in Royersford |
| | Vincent Dam (removed) | | | East Vincent Township and Linfield; 40°12′20″N 75°33′53″W | Schuylkill Canal Navigation Dam, breached and removed 2009 |
| | Rail bridge (removed) | | | Parker Ford and Linfield; 40°12′13″N 75°34′49″W | PRR industrial spur connecting Schuylkill Branch with industries in Linfield |
| | Limerick Road bridge | | 1932 | Parker Ford and Linfield; 40°12′18″N 75°34′51″W | |
| | Sanatoga Road Bridge (removed) | | | Fricks Lock and Sanatoga; 40°14′07″N 75°35′46″W | Ruin; macadam approaches |
| | Rail bridge (abandoned) | Conrail | | Fricks Lock and Pottstown; 40°14′00″N 75°36′27″W | Former PRR Schuylkill Branch |
| | Road bridge | US 422 | 2016 | Kenilworth and Pottstown; 40°13′54″N 75°37′30″W | |
| | Madison Bridge | Keim Street | 1935 | Kenilworth and Pottstown; 40°14′05″N 75°38′03″W | Closed October 2010 after a bridge inspection, scheduled for replacement or repair |
| | Hanover Street Bridge | Hanover Street | 1975 | North Coventry Township and Pottstown; 40°14′32″N 75°39′04″W | |
| | Road bridge | PA 100 (Pottstown Pike) | | North Coventry Township and Pottstown; 40°14′33″N 75°39′34″W | |
| | Rail bridge (abandoned) | | | North Coventry Township and Pottstown; 40°14′39″N 75°39′44″W | Former Reading spur, serviced Warwick Iron and Steel Company slag dumping operations |
| | Road bridge | US 422 | 1965 | North Coventry Township and Stowe; 40°14′35″N 75°40′29″W | |
=== Berks County ===
| | Road bridge | River Road | 1951 | Unionville (Union Township) and Douglassville; 40°14′59″N 75°43′30″W | |
| | Rail bridge (converted to trail bridge) | Schuylkill River Trail | | Unionville (Union Township) and Douglassville; 40°15′22″N 75°43′56″W | |
| | Monocacy Bridge | Main Street | 1914 | Monocacy (Union Township) and Monocacy Station; 40°15′30″N 75°46′06″W | |
| | Road bridge | PA 345 | 2014 | Birdsboro and Baumstown; 40°16′06″N 75°48′30″W | Former PA 82 |
| | Rail bridge | Norfolk Southern | 1925 | Birdsboro and Baumstown; 40°16′04″N 75°48′38″W | Reading Belt Branch of Norfolk Southern Harrisburg Line; also former Reading Wilmington and Northern branch |
| | Road bridge | Gibraltar Road | 1974 | Gibraltar and Lorane; 40°17′20″N 75°52′03″W | |
| | Highway bridge | US 422 (Benjamin Franklin Highway, West Shore Bypass) | 1963 | Ridgewood and Reiffton; 40°18′20″N 75°53′42″W | |
| | Highway bridge | US 422 (Benjamin Franklin Highway, West Shore Bypass) | 1963 | Poplar Neck and Ridgewood; 40°18′31″N 75°54′21″W | |
| | Rail bridge (converted to trail bridge) | Schuylkill River Trail – Thun Trail | | Poplar Neck and Ridgewood; 40°18′29″N 75°54′22″W | |
| | Rail bridge | Norfolk Southern | | Poplar Neck and Ridgewood; 40°18′12″N 75°54′21″W | Reading Belt branch of Norfolk Southern Harrisburg Line |
| | Road bridge | Poplar Neck Road | 1917 | Poplar Neck and Ridgewood; 40°18′08″N 75°54′20″W | |
| | Rail bridge | Norfolk Southern | | Kenhorst and Poplar Neck; 40°18′37″N 75°55′12″W | Reading Belt branch of Norfolk Southern Harrisburg Line |
| | Rail bridge (converted to trail bridge) | Schuylkill River Trail – Thun Trail | | Kenhorst and Poplar Neck; 40°18′41″N 75°55′11″W | |
| | Highway bridge | US 422 (Benjamin Franklin Highway, West Shore Bypass) | 1963 | Kenhorst and Poplar Neck; 40°18′44″N 75°55′11″W | |
| | Road bridge | US 222 Bus. (Bingaman Street) | | Kenhorst and Reading; 40°19′32″N 75°55′59″W | |
| | Rail bridge (converted to trail bridge) | Schuylkill River Trail – Thun Trail | | West Reading and Reading; 40°19′54.0″N 75°56′19.2″W | |
| | Road bridge | US 422 Bus. (Penn Street) | | West Reading and Reading; 40°20′7″N 75°56′14″W | |
| | Road bridge | Buttonwood Street | | West Reading and Reading; 40°20′21″N 75°56′35″W | |
| | Rail bridge | Norfolk Southern | | West Reading and Reading; 40°20′27″N 75°56′49″W | NS Harrisburg Line |
| | Road bridge | PA 183 (Schuylkill Avenue) | | Reading; 40°21′02″N 75°56′37″W | |
| | Road bridge | Cartech Road | | Reading; 40°21′39″N 75°56′17″W | Private |
| | Shepps Dam railroad bridge | Norfolk Southern | | Reading; 40°21′50″N 75°56′27″W | Norfolk Southern Reading Line (Allentown–Reading) |
| | Road bridge | PA 12 (Warren Street Bypass) | | Reading; 40°21′52″N 75°56′28″W | |
| | Road bridge | US 222 | 1966 | Reading; 40°23′37″N 75°58′22″W | |
| | Peacock's Lock Viaduct | Reading Blue Mountain and Northern Railroad | 1856 | 40°24′36″N 75°56′51″W | HAER PA-118 |
| | Road bridge | Cross Keys Road | 1973 | 40°24′53″N 75°56′23″W | |
| | Road bridge | Wall Street | 2018 | Leesport; 40°26′44″N 75°58′6″W | |
| | Road bridge | Bellemans Church Road | 1991 | Leesport and Dauberville; 40°27′24″N 75°58′38″W | |
| | Road bridge | Main Street | 1937 | Shoemakersville and Mohrsville; 40°28′20″N 75°58′20″W | |
| | Road bridge | Miller Street | 2019 | Shoemakersville; 40°29′44″N 75°58′17″W | |
| | Berne Bridge | Fisher Dam Road (TR 952) | 2015 | Berne; 40°31′20″N 75°59′52″W | 1889 truss bridge; 1896 per this website |
| | Road bridge | PA 61 | | Hamburg and West Hamburg; 40°33′07″N 75°59′32″W | |
| | Road bridge | State Street | 1927 | Hamburg and West Hamburg; 40°33′14″N 75°59′25″W | Old US 22 |
| | Rail bridge (converted to trail bridge) | Schuylkill River Trail | | Hamburg and West Hamburg; 40°33′20″N 75°59′20″W | Former PRR Schuylkill Branch |
| | Road bridge | I-78 / US 22 | | Hamburg and West Hamburg; 40°33′37″N 75°59′21″W | |
=== Schuylkill County ===
| | Road bridge | PA 61 | 1955 | Port Clinton, Tilden Township; 40°34′24.9″N 76°1′10″W | Connects Schuylkill and Berks Counties |
| | Rail bridge | Reading and Northern | | Port Clinton; 40°34′42.7″N 76°1′36.6″W | Yard access to Reading and Northern headquarters, carries Tamaqua branch |
| | Rail bridge | Reading and Northern main line | | West Brunswick Township; 40°35′21.8″N 76°4′32.5″W | |
| | Rail bridge (abandoned) | Former Pennsylvania Railroad | | West Brunswick Township; 40°35′19.7″N 76°4′32″W | Carried Pennsylvania Railroad (Pennsy) across Schuylkill River then Reading main line |
| | Road bridge (abandoned) | River Road/East Deer View Drive | 1903 | Auburn; 40°35′5.9″N 76°4′48.9″W | Closed to vehicles in 2000 due to structural deficiencies, still open to pedestrian traffic |
| | Rail bridge | Reading and Northern main line | | Auburn; 40°35′15.9″N 76°4′53.4″W | |
| | Road bridge | PA 895 | 1924 | West Brunswick Township; 40°36′6.7″N 76°5′19.2″W | |
| | Rail bridge | Former Pennsylvania Railroad, now active siding for industry | | West Brunswick Township; 40°36′32″N 76°6′7″W | Closed to Pennsy traffic but still carries siding to local factories |
| | Rail bridge | Former Pennsylvania Railroad, now active siding from Reading and Northern | | West Brunswick Township; 40°36′41.4″N 76°6′23.6″W | Closed to Pennsy traffic but still carries siding to local factories |
| | Rail bridge | Reading and Northern main line | | West Brunswick Township; 40°36′40.4″N 76°6′24″W | |
| | Landingville Dam | | | West Brunswick Township; 40°36′31.1″N 76°6′22.4″W | Desilting dam |
| | Rail bridge | Reading and Northern main line | | West Brunswick Township; 40°37′13.4″N 76°7′15.9″W | Stone arch construction |
| | Road bridge | Tunnel Road | 1925 | West Brunswick Township; 40°37′19.2″N 76°7′8.8″W | Wooden deck, single-lane vehicle bridge |
| | Road bridge | Meadow Drive/Main Street | 1923 | Landingville; 40°37′43″N 76°7′28.5″W | |
| | Rail bridge | Reading and Northern main line | | North Manheim Township; 40°37′46″N 76°9′14.9″W | |
| | Road bridge | PA 443 (Columbia Street) | 1921 | Schuylkill Haven; 40°37′26.6″N 76°10′29″W | Partially renovated in 2007 |
| | Rail bridge | Reading and Northern main line | | Schuylkill Haven; 40°37′45.8″N 76°10′27.1″W | |
| | Road bridge | Fritz Reed Avenue | 1929 | Schuylkill Haven; 40°37′59.8″N 76°10′26.4″W | Provides vehicle access to Schuylkill Haven Island Park (Irish Flats) |
| | Rail bridge (abandoned) | Abandoned industrial siding | | Schuylkill Haven; 40°38′1.4″N 76°10′48.2″W | |
| | Dam (removed) | | | Schuylkill Haven; 40°38′1.8″N 76°10′48.3″W | Sunken wood and concrete dam breached in center |
| | Road bridge | PA 183 (Pottsville Street) | 1951 | Cressona; 40°38′14.6″N 76°10′57.2″W | |
| | Road bridge | PA 61 exit ramp to PA 183 | 1951 | Cressona; 40°38′15.8″N 76°10′59.4″W | |
| | Road bridge | Access to Cressona Mall | | Cressona; 40°38′16.9″N 76°11′3.2″W | |
| | Road bridge | Mount Carbon Arch Road | 1925 | Mount Carbon; 40°40′21.2″N 76°11′8.2″W | |
| | Rail bridge | Reading and Northern main line | | Pottsville; 40°40′45.4″N 76°11′20.9″W | |
| | Rail bridge (abandoned) | Former Pennsylvania Railroad | | Pottsville; 40°40′52″N 76°11′25.5″W | Concrete arch with no track remaining |
| | Bridge | PA 61 | 2015 | Pottsville; 40°40′53.5″N 76°11′23.5″W | |
| | Bridge | Access to medical plaza | | Pottsville; 40°40′57.1″N 76°11′18.5″W | |
| | Road bridge (abandoned) | Collin Street | | Pottsville and Palo Alto; 40°41′0.7″N 76°11′11″W | Closed in 2006, still open to pedestrian traffic, slated for replacement |
