= Philadelphia and Reading Railroad Bridge =

Philadelphia and Reading Railroad Bridge may refer to one of four bridges crossing the Schulykill River in Pennsylvania:

- Philadelphia & Reading Railroad Bridge (Harrisburg, Pennsylvania), between Harrisburg and Cumberland County
- Philadelphia & Reading Railroad Bridge at West Falls, in Philadelphia
- Philadelphia & Reading Railroad Mule Bridge, in Philadelphia
- Philadelphia & Reading Railroad Schuylkill River Viaduct in Fairmount Park, Philadelphia
