= Pearl Harbor Memorial Bridge (Pennsylvania) =

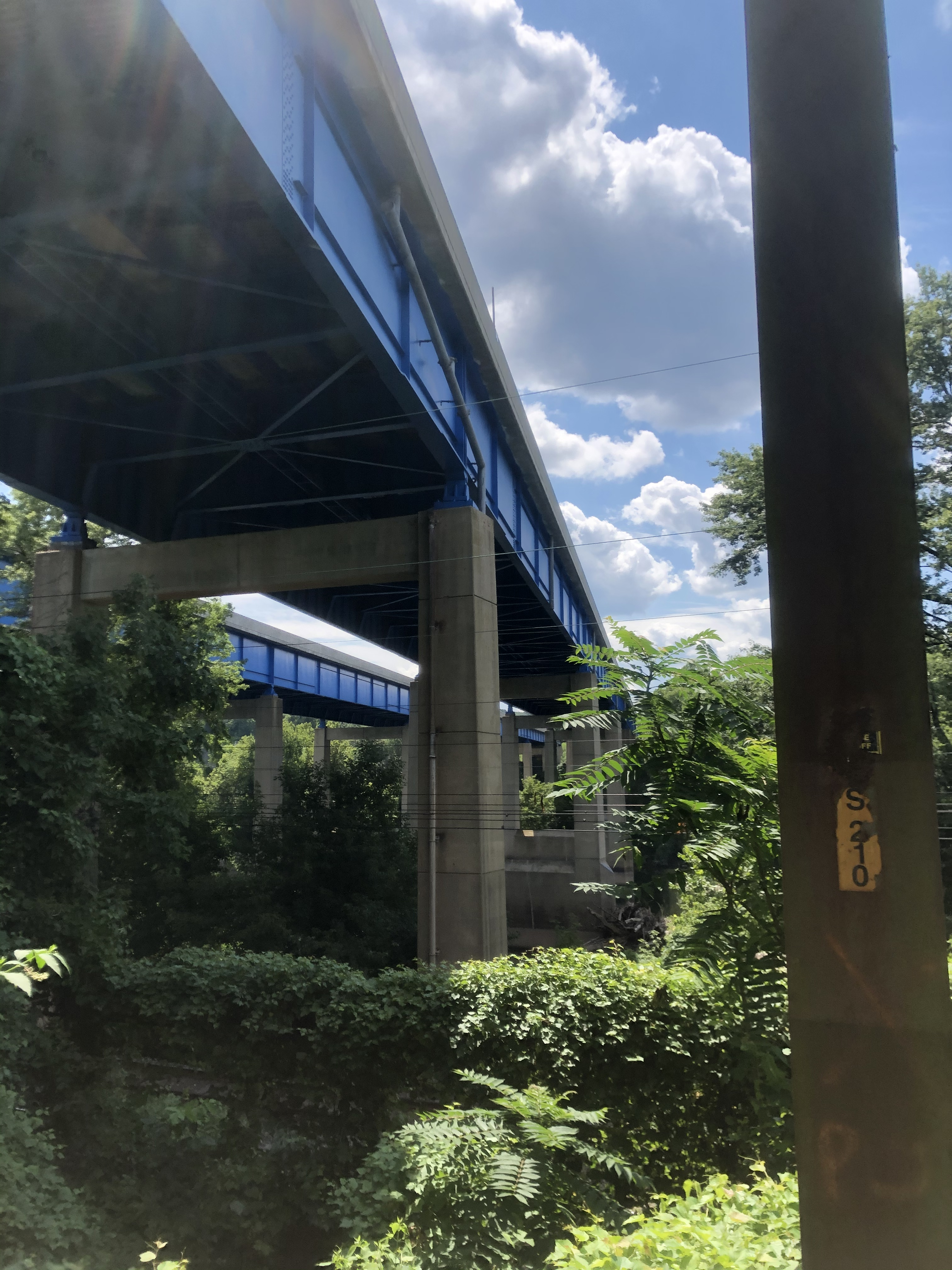
- Coordinates: 40°04′42″N 75°19′05″W
- Carries: I-476 (Blue Route)
- Crosses: Schuylkill River
- Locale: West Conshohocken and Connaughtown

Location
- Interactive map of Pearl Harbor Memorial Bridge

The Pearl Harbor Memorial Bridge is a bridge that carries Interstate 476 (I-476) across the Schuylkill River between West Conshohocken and Connaughtown. Originally an unnamed bridge, Richard Tilghman, a state representative, proposed legislation to change the name of the bridge to commemorate the events that drew the United States into World War II. The bridge is notable for being in one of the most heavily-congested areas in the Philadelphia area. The bridge was chosen for the rename due to Conshohocken and West Conshohocken’s refusal to rename the Matsonford Bridge due to its important history.

== See also ==
- List of crossings of the Schuylkill River
