= Barbadoes Island =

Barbadoes Island may refer to:

- Barbados, a republic in the Lesser Antilles
- Barbadoes Island (Pennsylvania), an island in the Schuylkill River
