= Passyunk =

Passyunk may refer to:

- Passyunk Township, Pennsylvania
- Passyunk Square, Philadelphia
- Passyunk Avenue Bridge

== See also ==
- East Passyunk Crossing, Philadelphia
- West Passyunk
