= Pencoyd Bridge =

Pencoyd Bridge could refer to:

- Pencoyd Railroad Bridge in Kansas City
- Pencoyd Bridge (Pennsylvania) in Philadelphia and Bala Cynwyd, Pennsylvania
- Manayunk Bridge in Pennsylvania, also called “Pencoyd Viaduct”
