= Philadelphia and Reading Railroad Schuylkill River Viaduct =

Reading Railroad Bridge over Schuylkill River
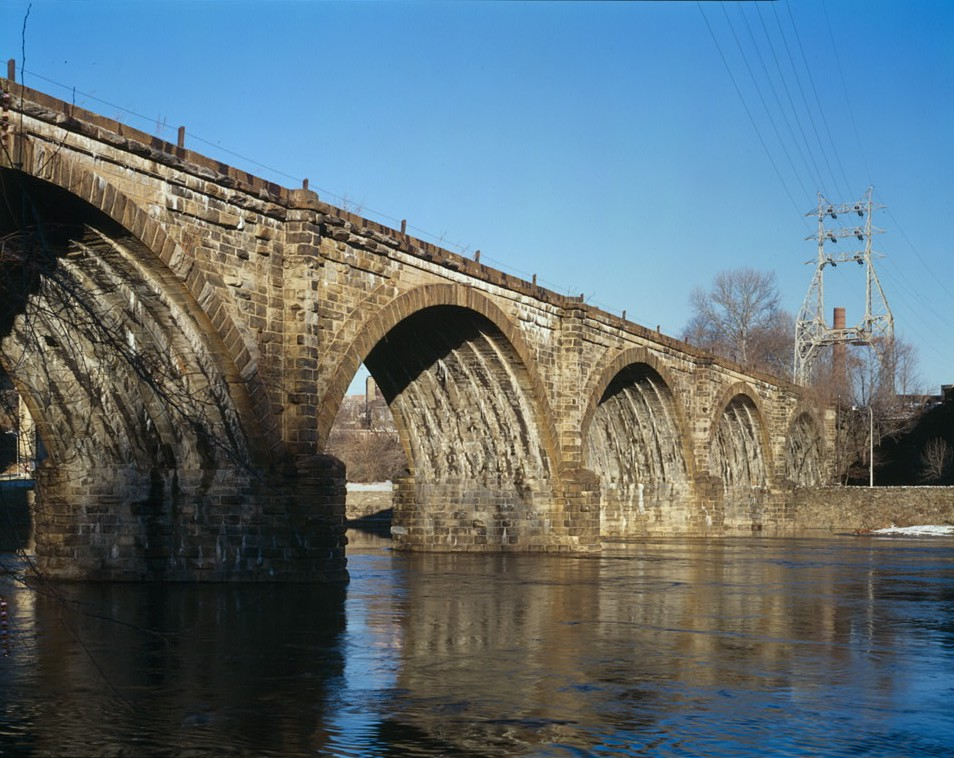
- Coordinates: 40°00′23″N 75°11′34″W
- Crosses: Schuylkill River, Martin Luther King, Jr. Drive, Kelly Drive
- Locale: Fairmount Park
- Official name: Philadelphia and Reading Railroad, Schuylkill River Viaduct
- Other name(s): Reading Railroad Bridge, or Falls Rail Bridge

Characteristics
- Design: Stone ribbed skew arch

History
- Designer: Gustavus A. Nicolls
- Opened: 1856

The Philadelphia and Reading Railroad, Schuylkill River Viaduct, also called the Reading Railroad Bridge and the Falls Rail Bridge, is a stone arch bridge that carries rail traffic over the Schuylkill River at Falls of Schuylkill (East Falls) in Philadelphia, Pennsylvania. Located in Fairmount Park, the bridge also spans Martin Luther King, Jr., Drive, and Kelly Drive. The name Philadelphia & Reading Railroad (P&R) was later shortened to Reading Company.

The current bridge replaced an adjacent P&R bridge, built of wood. Prior to that, one of the earliest suspension bridges in the United States, the 1808 Chain Bridge at Falls of Schuylkill, was built at this location. That collapsed in 1816, and was replaced in 1818 by a covered bridge, built on the chain bridge's abutments. The covered bridge washed away in 1822.

The P&R built the viaduct, 1853–56, to carry coal cars to the company's coal terminal on the Delaware River in the Port Richmond neighborhood of Philadelphia.

The bridge's design is unusual. Because it crosses the river at an oblique angle, it was constructed as a ribbed skew arch bridge, with each span composed of a series of offset stone arches. While not as strong as skewed barrel vault spans, these spans were much easier to build, while still assuring that the bridge's abutments were parallel to the water flow.

The bridge consists of six main spans, each 78 feet (24 m) in length, crossing the river and Kelly Drive; five small arches, each 9 feet (2.7 m) in length, for pedestrian traffic; and a 30-foot (9.1 m) arch over Martin Luther King, Jr., Drive. The bridge's spandrel walls were reinforced in 1935. The bridge continues to carry rail traffic to this day.

== Gallery ==
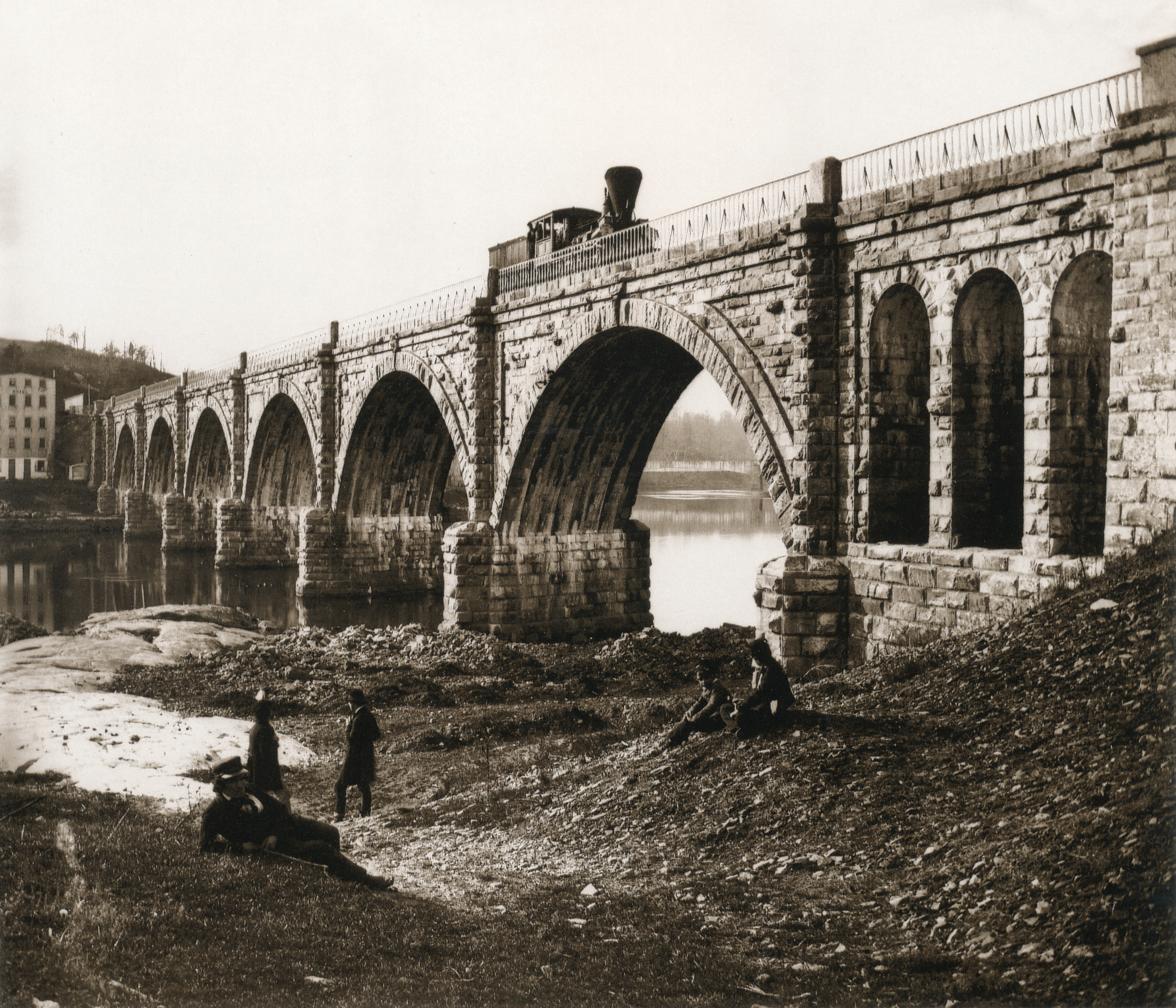
Schuylkill River Viaduct, circa 1859.

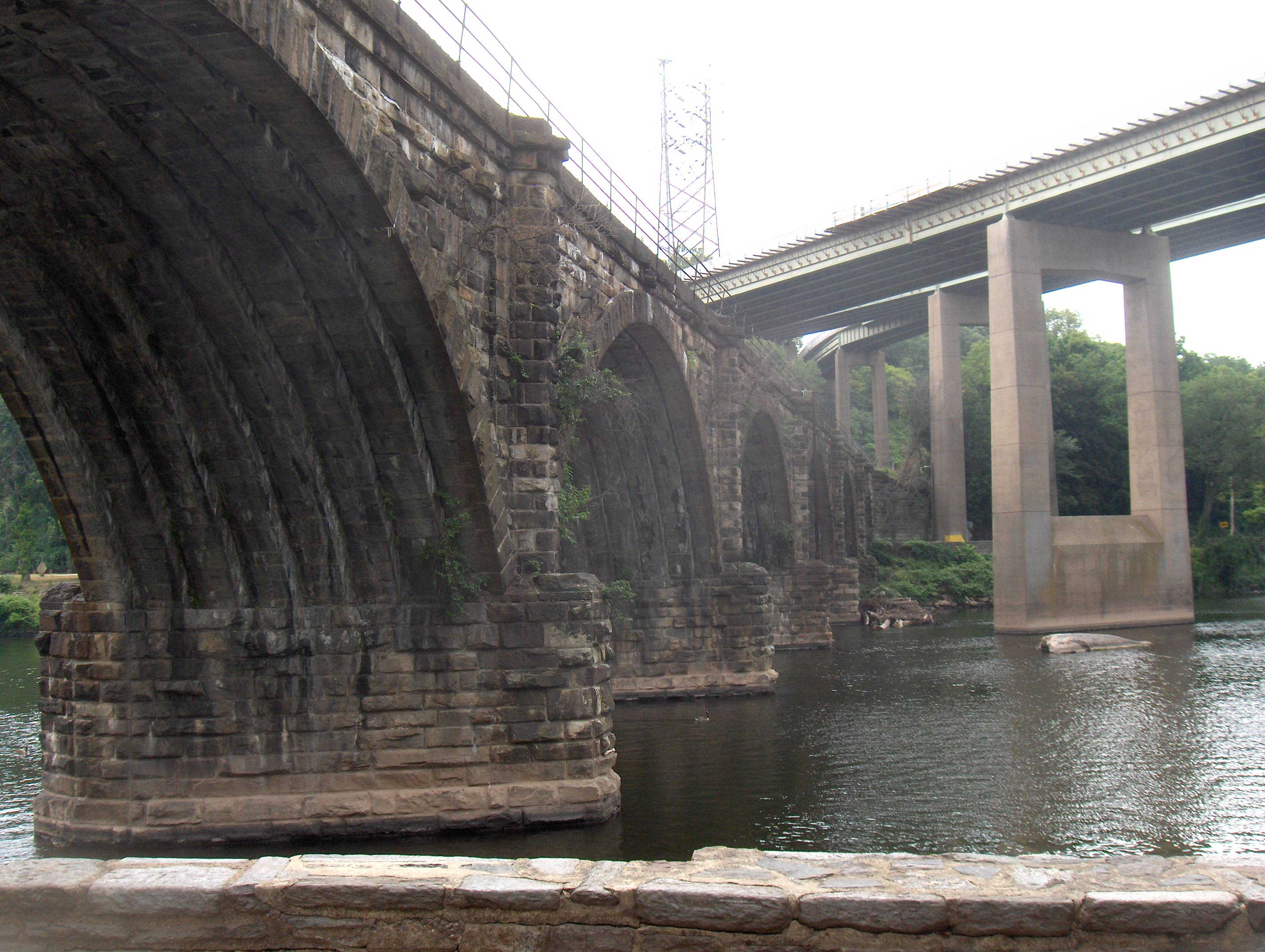
Philadelphia & Reading Railroad, Schuylkill River Viaduct, in 2010.

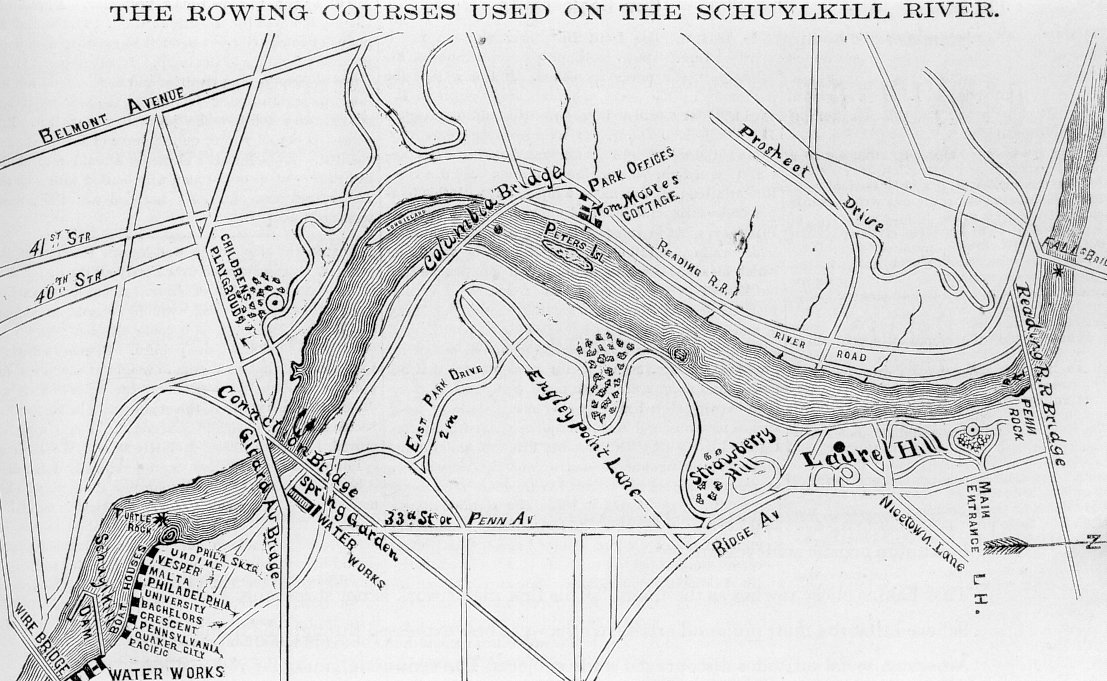
1872 map of Schuylkill River showing the Reading Railroad Bridge.

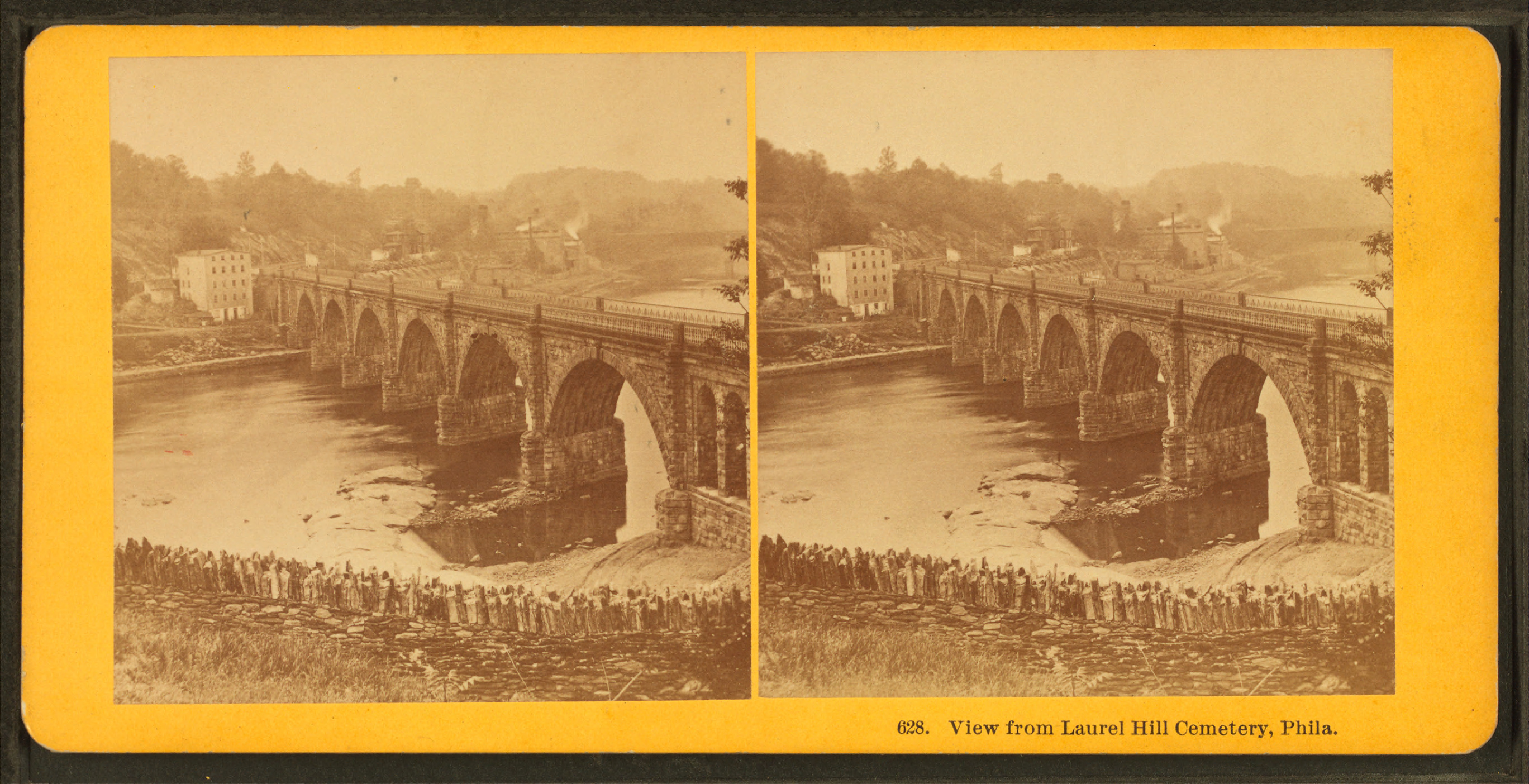
"View from Laurel Hill Cemetery, Phila." (before 1895). Reading Railroad Bridge, with former Falls Covered Bridge in the distance.

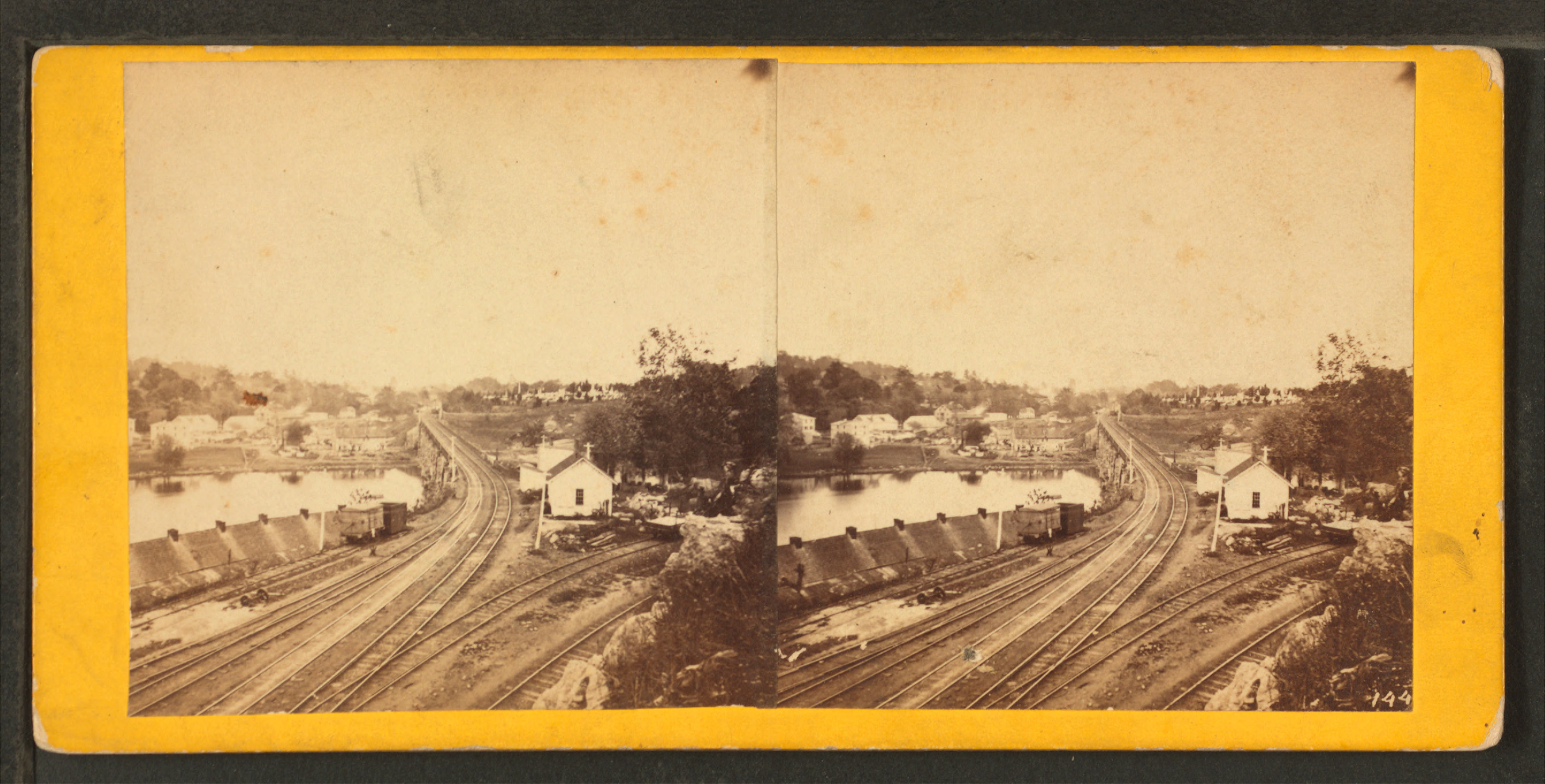
"Falls Station Bridge leading to [Port] Richmond, near Philadelphia." Laurel Hill Cemetery is visible in the upper right.

== See also ==
- List of bridges documented by the Historic American Engineering Record in Pennsylvania
- List of crossings of the Schuylkill River
- Chain Bridge at Falls of Schuylkill
