= Philadelphia and Reading Railroad, Bridge at West Falls =

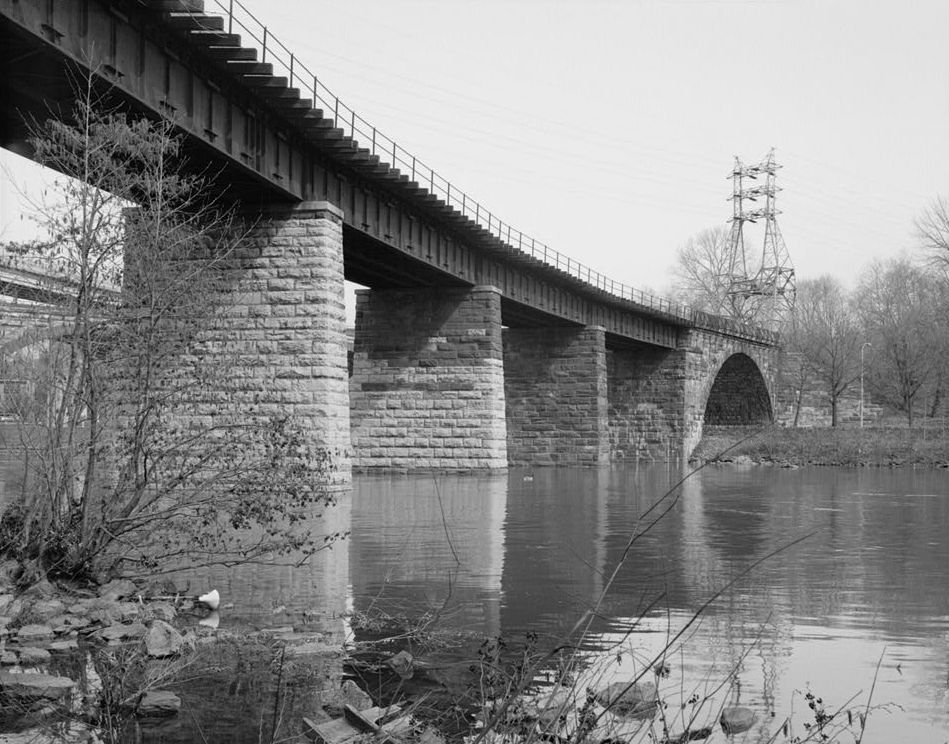
- Reading Railroad Bridge at West Falls, looking east toward Kelly Drive
- Coordinates: 40°00′23″N 75°11′33″W
- Carries: CSX Trenton Subdivision
- Crosses: Kelly Drive, Schuylkill River, and Martin Luther King Drive (formerly West River Drive)
- Locale: Philadelphia, Pennsylvania, United States

Characteristics
- Design: Arch bridge
- Material: Stone
- Width: two tracks
- Longest span: 92.8 feet (28.3 m)
- No. of spans: 9
- Piers in water: 6

History
- Construction end: 1890

The Philadelphia and Reading Railroad, Bridge at West Falls is a stone and iron plate girder bridge that is located in Philadelphia, Pennsylvania. It carries two CSX Trenton Subdivision tracks over Kelly Drive, Schuylkill River, and Martin Luther King Jr. Drive (formerly West River Drive).

== History and notable features ==
This was built in 1890 by the Reading Railroad, and forms a "Y" junction with the adjacent Philadelphia and Reading Railroad Schuylkill River Viaduct (1854).

The bridge consists of an 80-foot (24 m) stone arch over Kelly Drive and eight plate-girder spans that follow a 6-degree curve.

== See also ==
- List of bridges documented by the Historic American Engineering Record in Pennsylvania
- List of crossings of the Schuylkill River

== Gallery ==
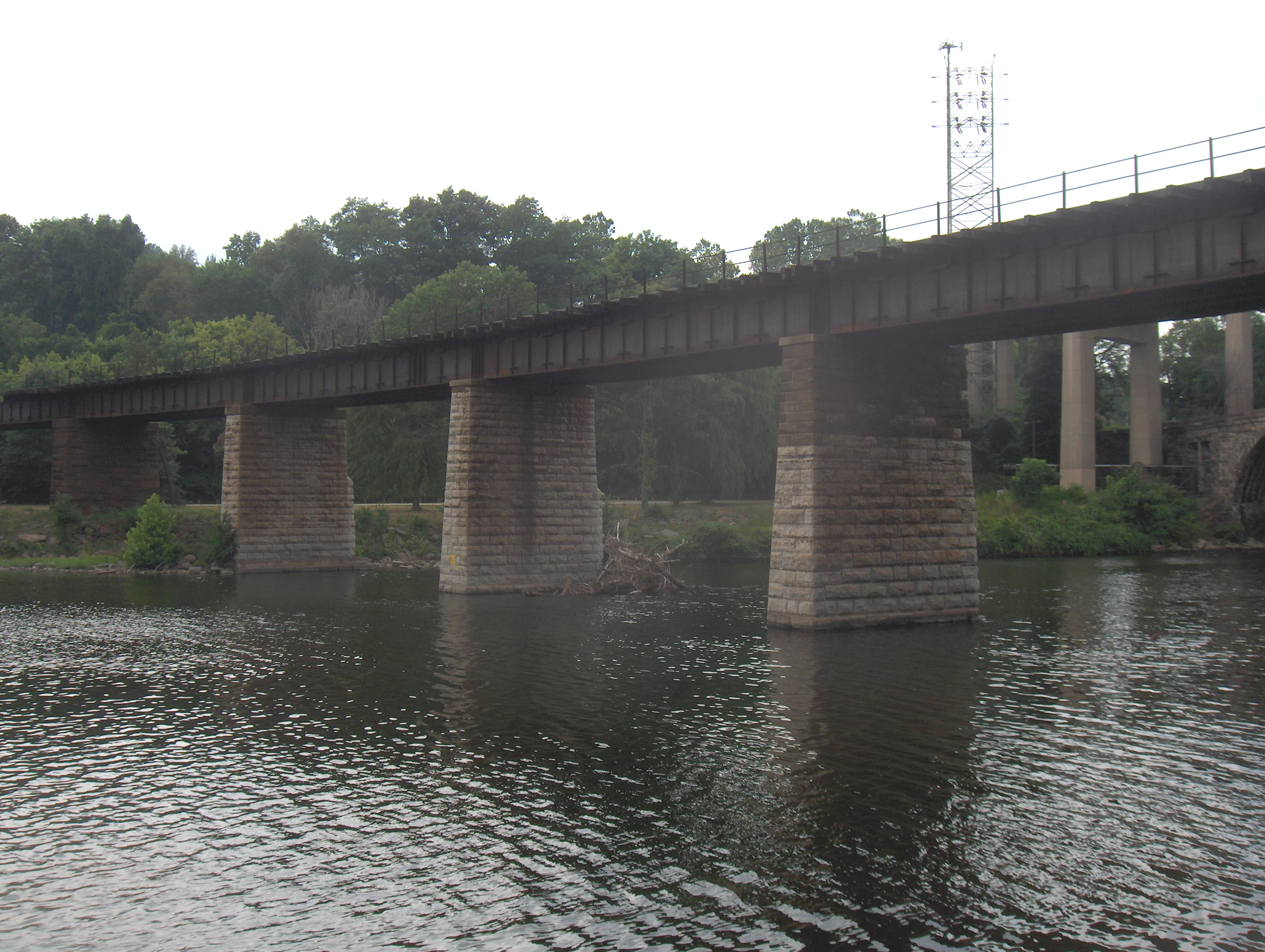
Philadelphia & Reading Railroad Bridge, West Falls, looking upstream from Kelly Drive
