= Schuylkill Expressway Bridge =

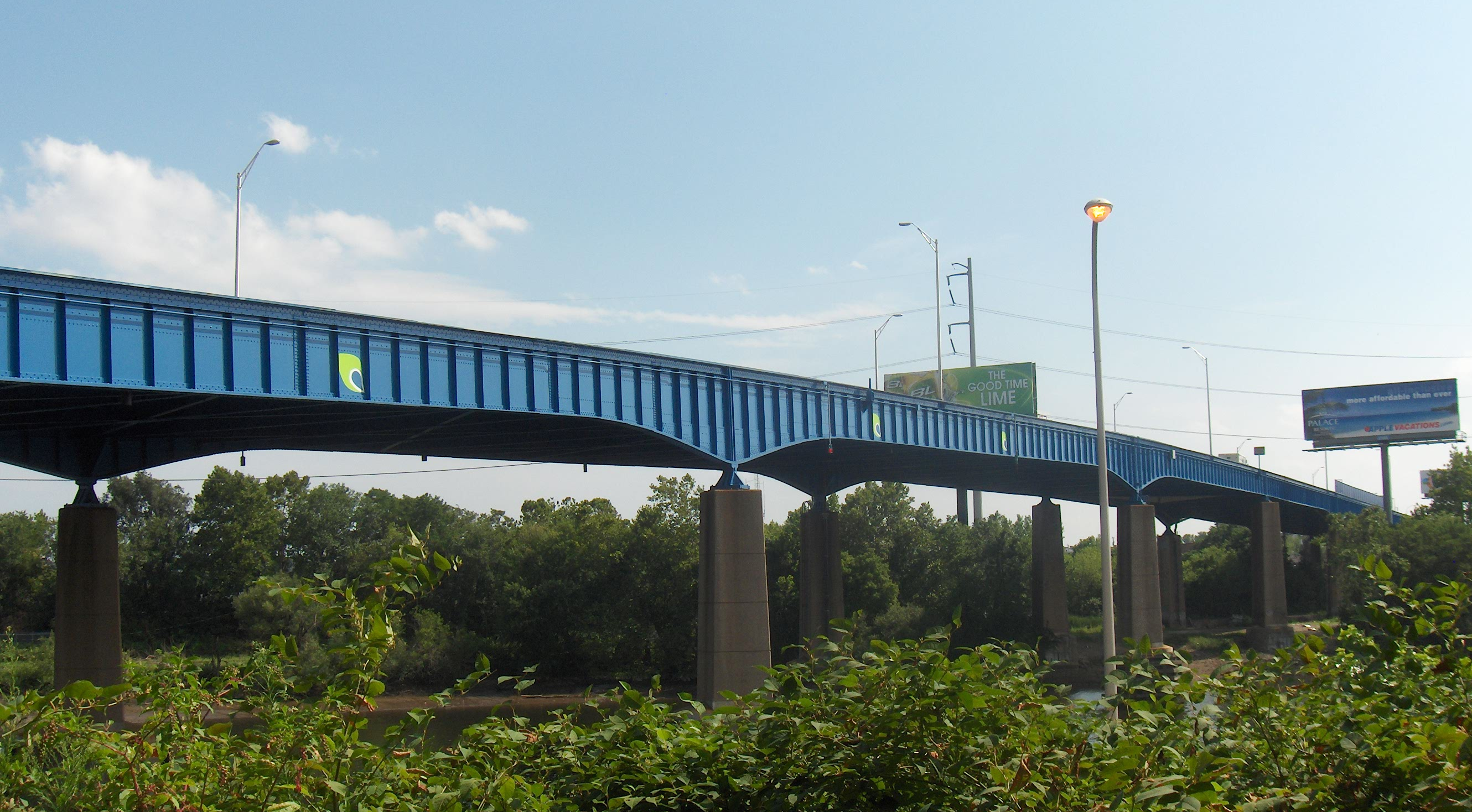
- The Schuylkill Expressway Bridge
- Coordinates: 39.94180°N 75.19418°W
- Carries: I-76 (Schuylkill Expressway)
- Crosses: Schuylkill River,
- Locale: Philadelphia, Pennsylvania
- Official name: Schuylkill Expressway Bridge
- Owner: Pennsylvania Department of Transportation
- Maintained by: PennDOT
- ID number: 670076345404140

Characteristics
- Design: Riveted haunched deck plate girder
- Material: Steel, concrete
- Total length: 1641.2 feet
- Width: 54.1 feet
- No. of spans: 6
- Piers in water: 6
- No. of lanes: 2 north 2 south 4 total

History
- Opened: 1956

Statistics
- Daily traffic: 69,892 as of 2009

The Schuylkill Expressway Bridge, built in 1956 by the Pennsylvania Department of Transportation, and reconstructed and painted blue in 2010, carries the Schuylkill Expressway (I-76) over the Schuylkill River between West Philadelphia and the Grays Ferry section of South Philadelphia.

== See also ==
- List of crossings of the Schuylkill River
