= Peacock's Lock Viaduct =

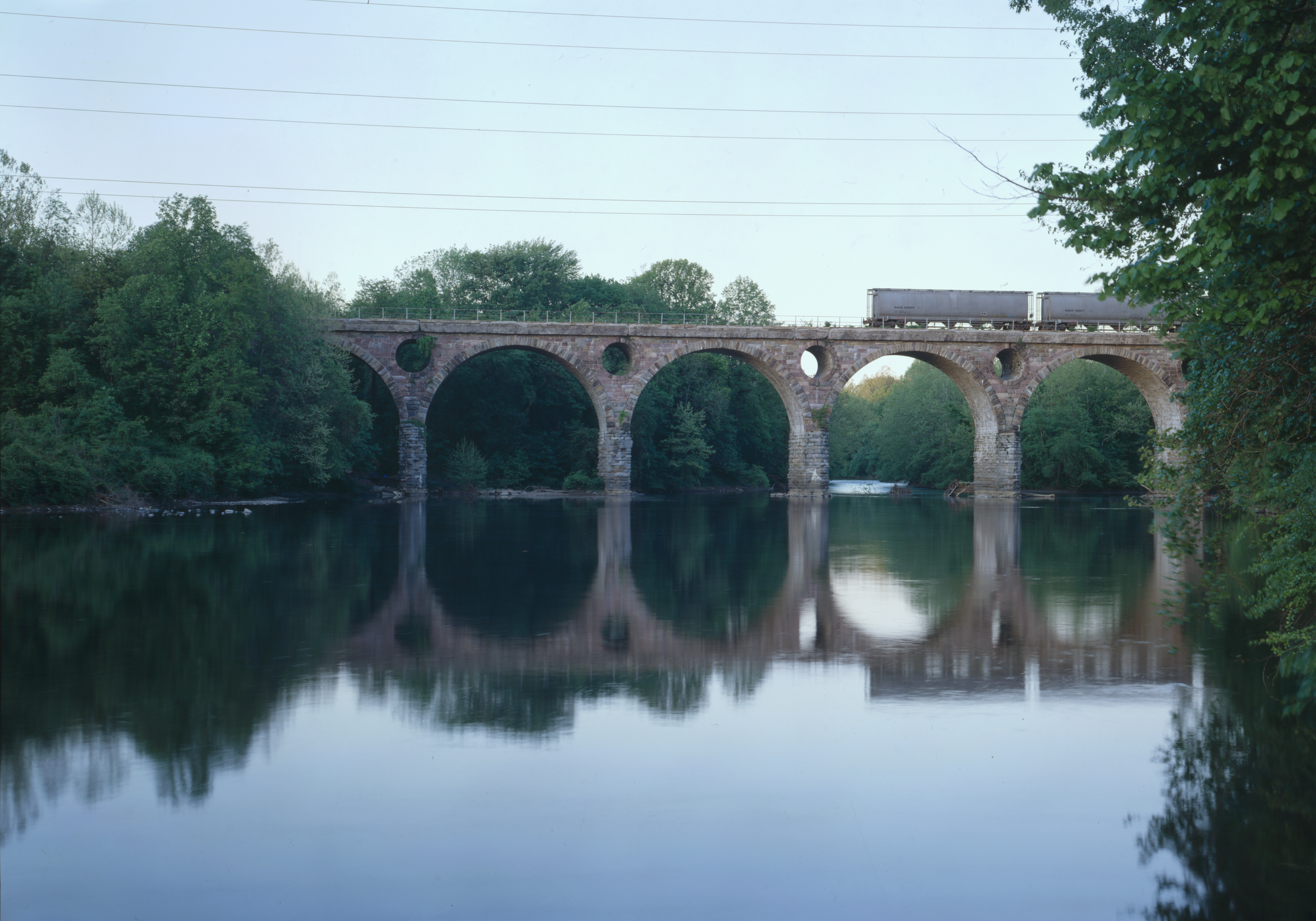
- Peacock's Lock Viaduct in 1999.
- Coordinates: 40°24′36″N 75°56′51″W
- Carries: Reading Blue Mountain and Northern Railroad
- Crosses: Schuylkill River
- Locale: Reading, Pennsylvania

Characteristics
- Design: Arch bridge
- Material: Stone
- Longest span: 46 feet (14 m)
- No. of spans: 9

History
- Designer: Philadelphia and Reading Railroad
- Construction start: 1853
- Opened: 1856

Location
- Interactive map of Peacock's Lock Viaduct

Peacock's Lock Viaduct is a stone arch bridge over the Schuylkill River near Reading, Pennsylvania, constructed by the Philadelphia and Reading Railroad between 1853 and 1856. It is named for a nearby lock on the Schuylkill Canal. Some sources use the name "Peacock's Locks Viaduct" ("Locks" is plural) because there is a pair of nearby locks ("Peacock's Locks") not just one.

The bridge is notable for its pierced spandrels, or circular openings between the arch rings and the deck. While this feature is found on some European bridges, it is extremely rare, if not unique, in the United States.

== See also ==
- List of bridges documented by the Historic American Engineering Record in Pennsylvania
- List of crossings of the Schuylkill River
