= South Street Bridge (Philadelphia, Pennsylvania) =

Bridge in Philadelphia

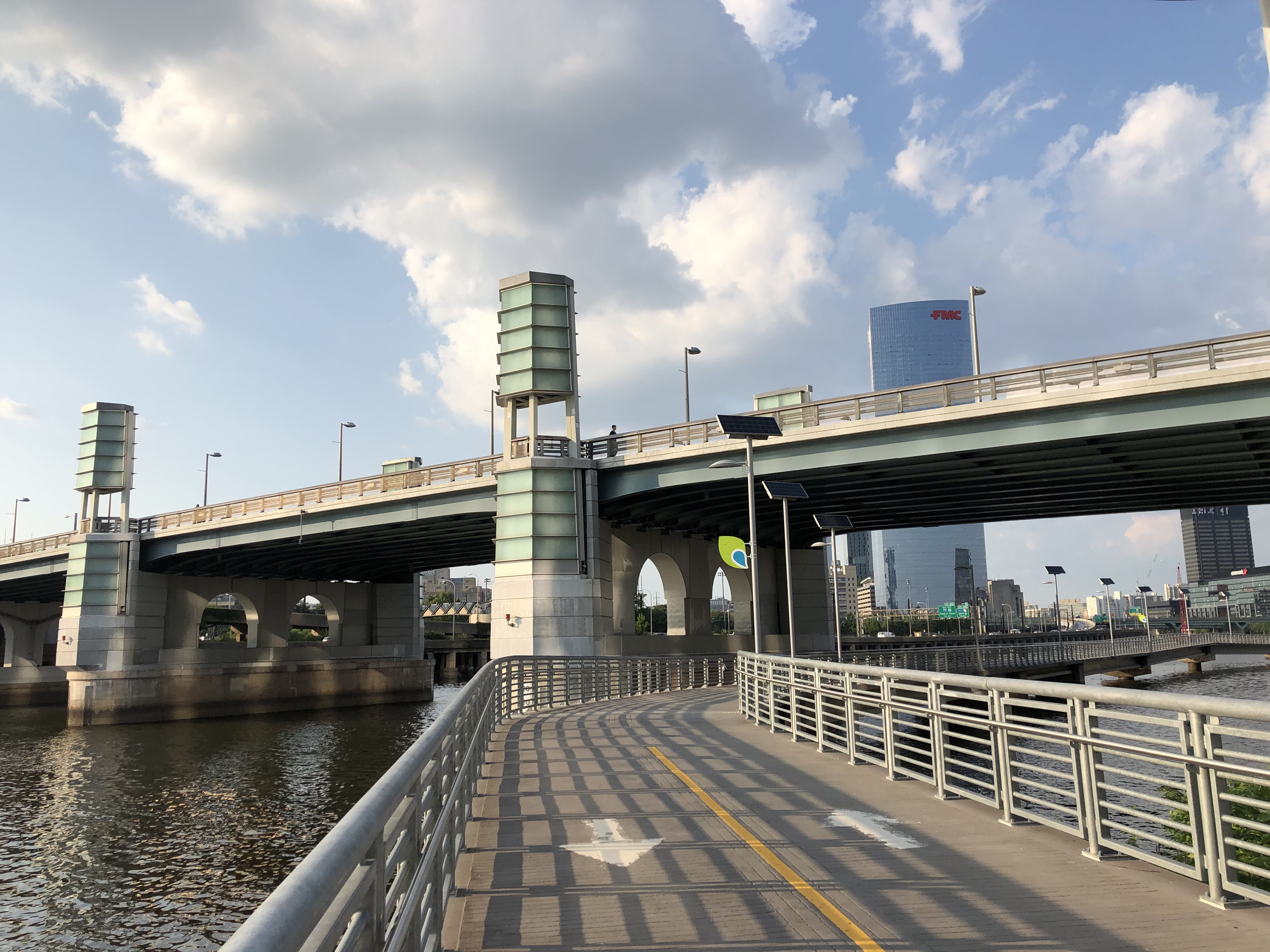
- South Street Bridge (foreground) with Cira Centre South (background) in Philadelphia
- Coordinates: 39°56′30″N 75°11′52″W
- Carries: South Street
- Crosses: Schuylkill River
- Locale: Philadelphia, Pennsylvania, U.S.
- Official name: South Street Bridge
- Owner: City of Philadelphia
- Maintained by: Driscoll Construction Company, Inc., Philadelphia, Pennsylvania
- Preceded by: 1920 span

Characteristics
- Material: Steel, concrete
- Total length: 753 ft (230 m)
- Width: 82.7 ft (25.2 m)
- Longest span: 144 ft (44 m)
- No. of spans: 7
- Clearance below: 13.1 ft (4.0 m)

History
- Designer: H2L2 Architects/Planners, LLC
- Constructed by: Driscoll Construction Company, Inc., Philadelphia, Pennsylvania, U.S.
- Construction end: 2010

Location
- Interactive map of South Street Bridge

South Street Bridge is a bridge that was reconstructed in 2010 in Philadelphia, Pennsylvania.

== History ==
The first bridge was completed in 1876, but due to cracks in the steel bridges structure it had to be replaced, and in 1880 the new bridge was completed.

A new bridge was built in 1923.

From 2003 to until its closure in 2009, pieces of the eroding bridge concrete would fall into the Schuylkill River and onto the Schuylkill Expressway. On November 6, 2010, the original bridge was completely torn down and replaced.

== Architectural features ==
South Street Bridge is notable landmark in Philadelphia as drivers along the Schuylkill Expressway can see images on its glowing mesh. Bruce Chamberlain said that the mesh "... gave the bridge a soft glow at night, while maintaining the openness desired by the design team and community." The lights stopped working in 2017, and haven't been up since then. Stimulus funding also subsidized connections from the new bridge to a "boardwalk" on the Schuylkill River Trail, which passes under the bridge.

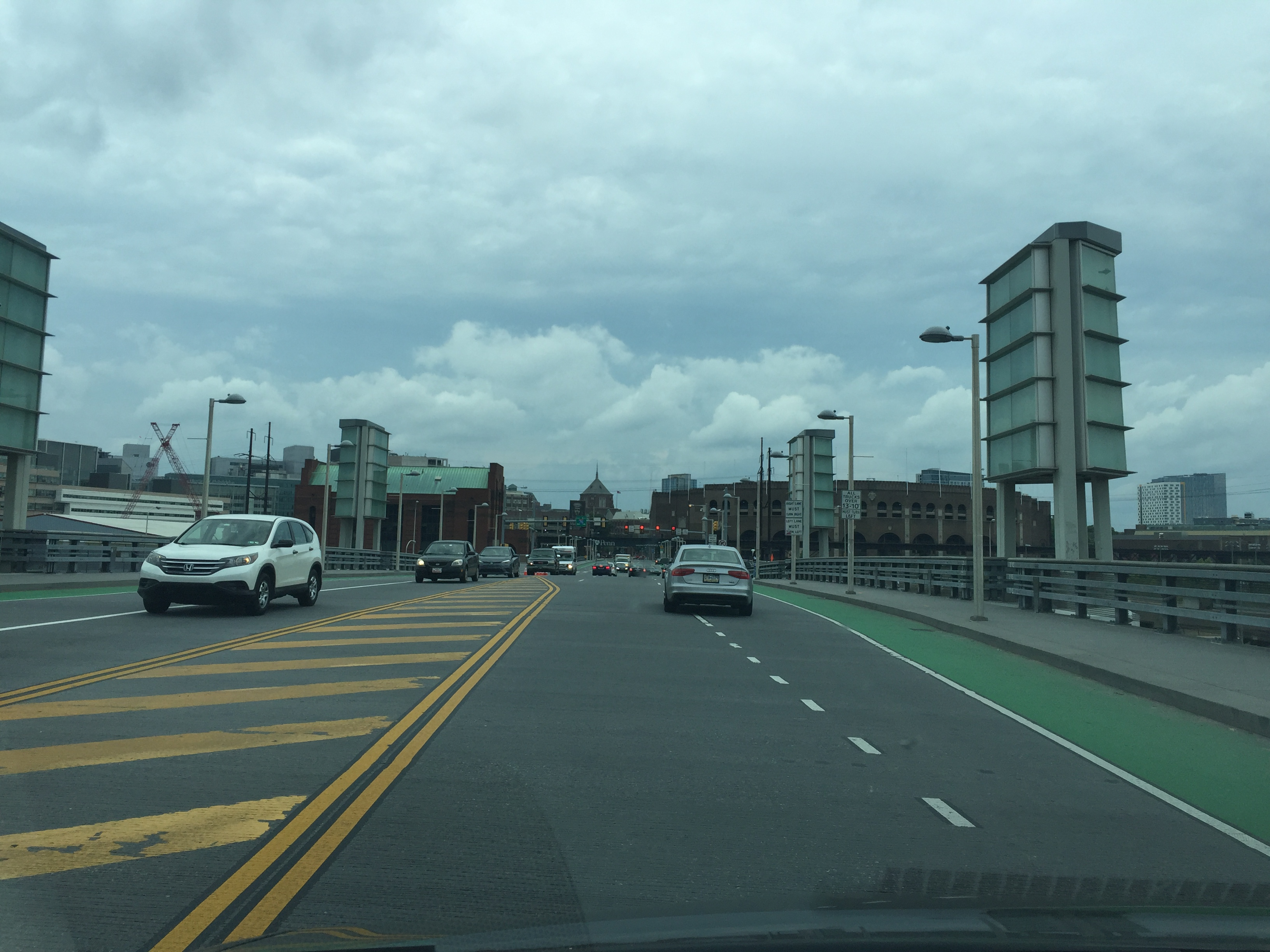
South Street Bridge platform

== See also ==
- List of bridges documented by the Historic American Engineering Record in Pennsylvania
- List of crossings of the Schuylkill River
