= Schuylkill River Bridge =

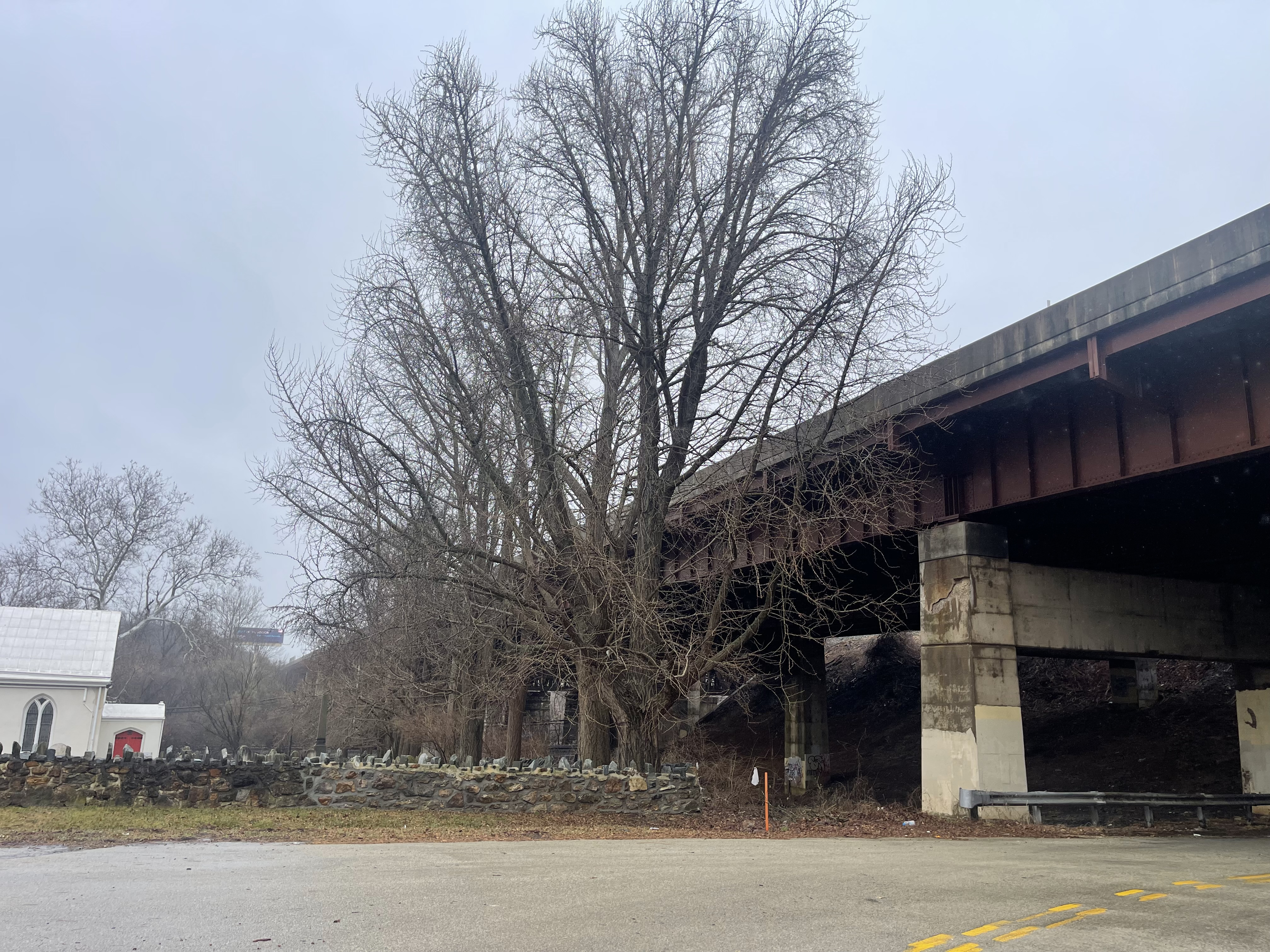
- Coordinates: 40°06′11″N 75°19′30″W
- Carries: I-276 / Penna Turnpike
- Crosses: Schuylkill River

Characteristics
- Total length: 1,224 feet (373 m)

History
- Opened: 1954

The Schuylkill River Bridge (also known as the Diamond Run Viaduct) is a bridge that carries the Pennsylvania Turnpike across the Schuylkill River.

This section of the Pennsylvania Turnpike, which is located between two major interchanges, became "the most heavily traveled four-lane section of the turnpike" following its opening, according to the Pennsylvania Turnpike Commission.

== History and architectural features ==
The length of the Schuylkill River Bridge is 1,224 feet (373 m). Built in 1954, it was rehabilitated during the 1990s, along with the Diamond Run Viaduct, in order to accommodate future travel needs. In mid-April 1993 and May 1995, meetings were sponsored by the Pennsylvania Turnpike Commission to enable members of the general public to review and provide feedback regarding a feasibility study that was being conducted by the commission and its design consultants to determine the potential for widening and rehabilitating both the Schuylkill River Bridge and the Diamond Run Viaduct." Commission members planned to widen the bridges "to accommodate an eventual expansion to six lanes" of the roadway between the Valley Forge Interchange and the Norristown Interchange, which were also known, respectively at that time, as exits 24 and 25 of the turnpike. The cost of the improvements were estimated at thirty million dollars.

The bridge was improved with a $34.5 million budget.

The bridge was widened as part of the general turnpike widening project that took place between the Norristown and Valley Forge exits between 1998 and 2000. An estimated 50,000 automobile users were impacted by the construction project.

== See also ==
- List of crossings of the Schuylkill River
