= Green Lane Bridge =

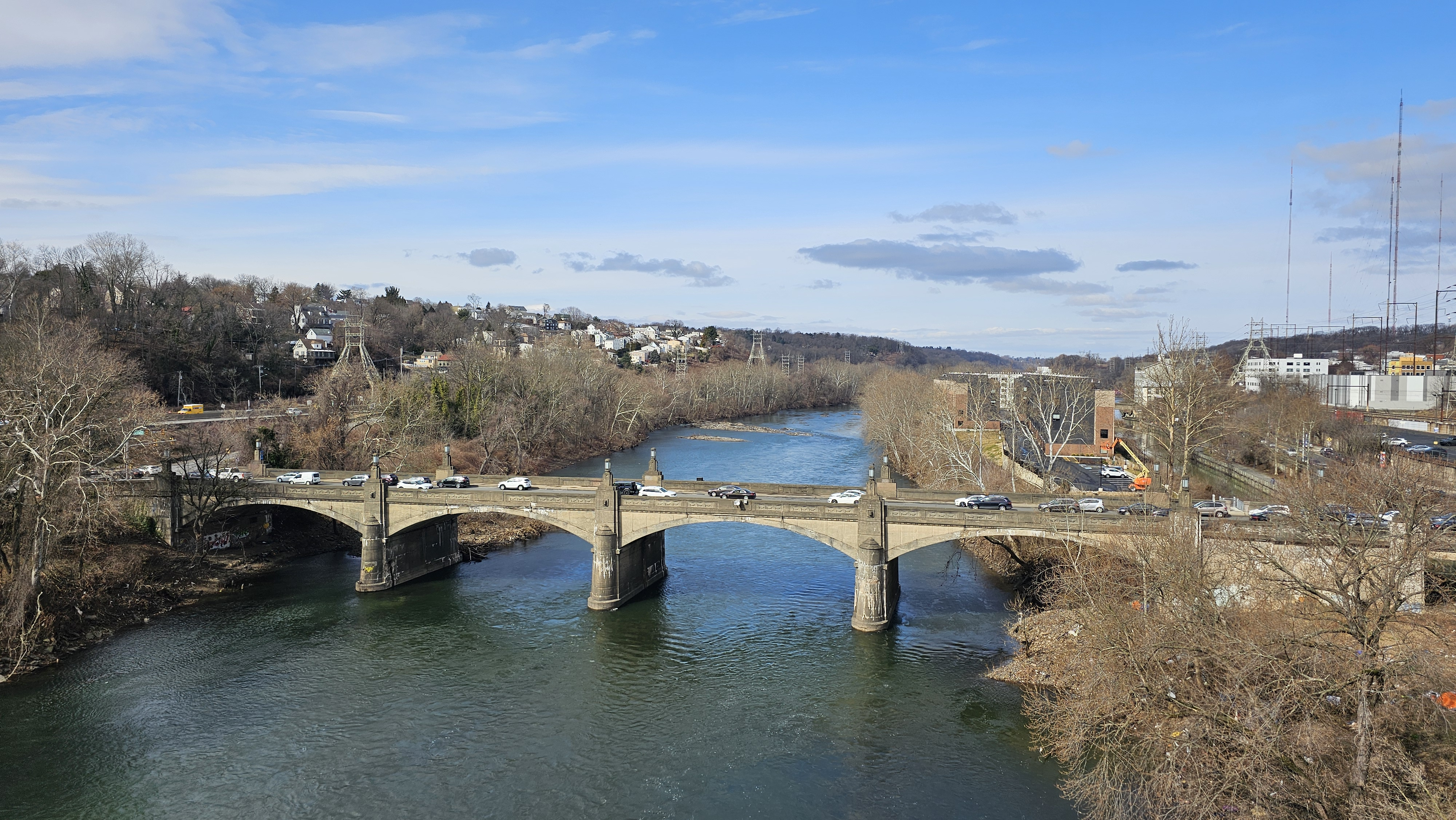
- The Green Lane Bridge, 2024
- Coordinates: 40°01′34″N 75°13′41″W
- Carries: Green Lane
- Crosses: Schuylkill River
- Locale: Philadelphia/Belmont Hills, Pennsylvania

Characteristics
- Material: Concrete

History
- Opened: 1928

Location
- Interactive map of Green Lane Bridge

The Green Lane Bridge is a concrete arch bridge over the Schuylkill River opened to traffic in 1928, which carries Green Lane in Philadelphia. The bridge connects Belmont Hills with Manayunk.

== See also ==
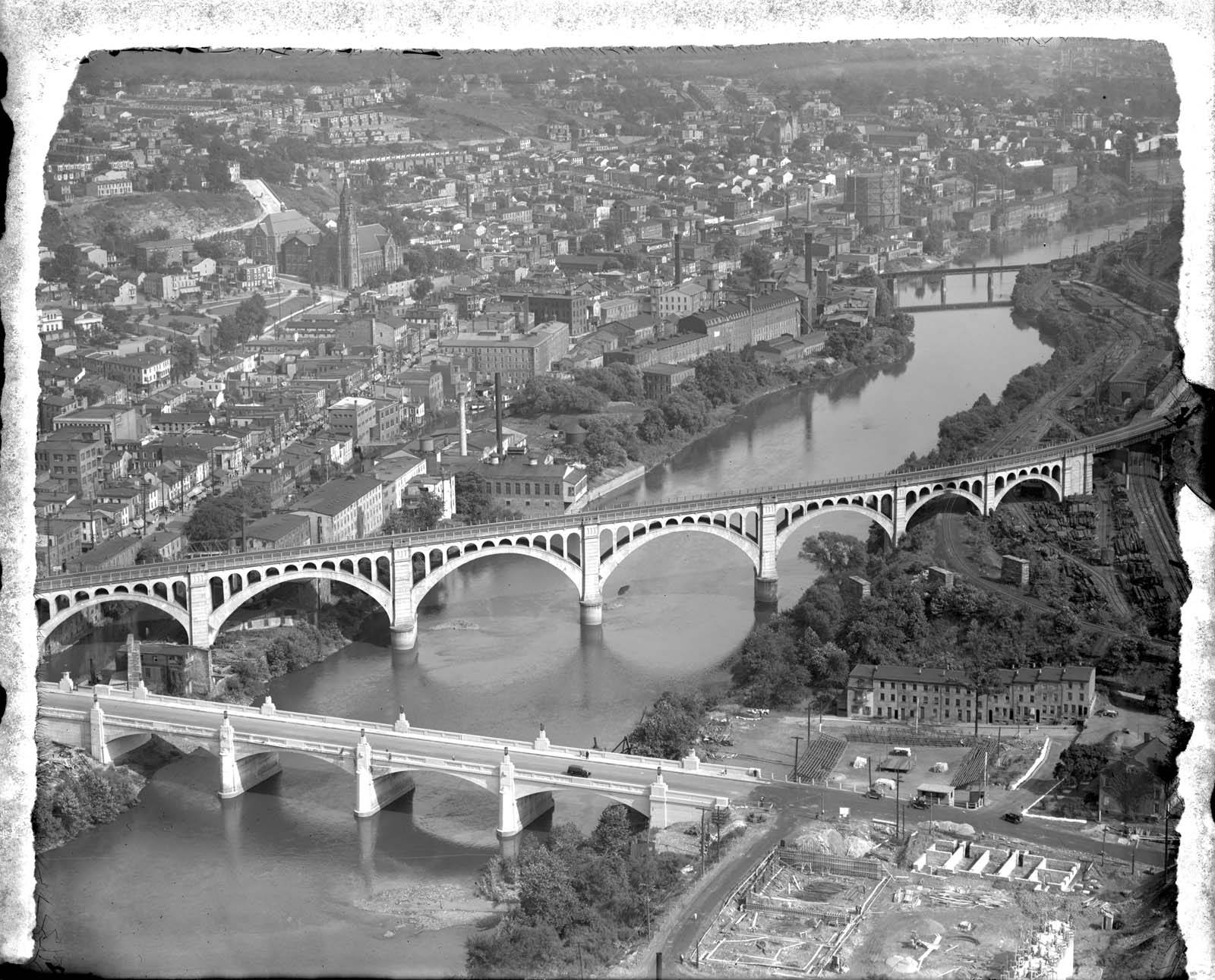
Green Lane Bridge shown among other bridges in the area in Green Lane, Philadelphia

- List of crossings of the Schuylkill River
