= Betzwood =

Coordinates: 40.1108°N 75.4182°W

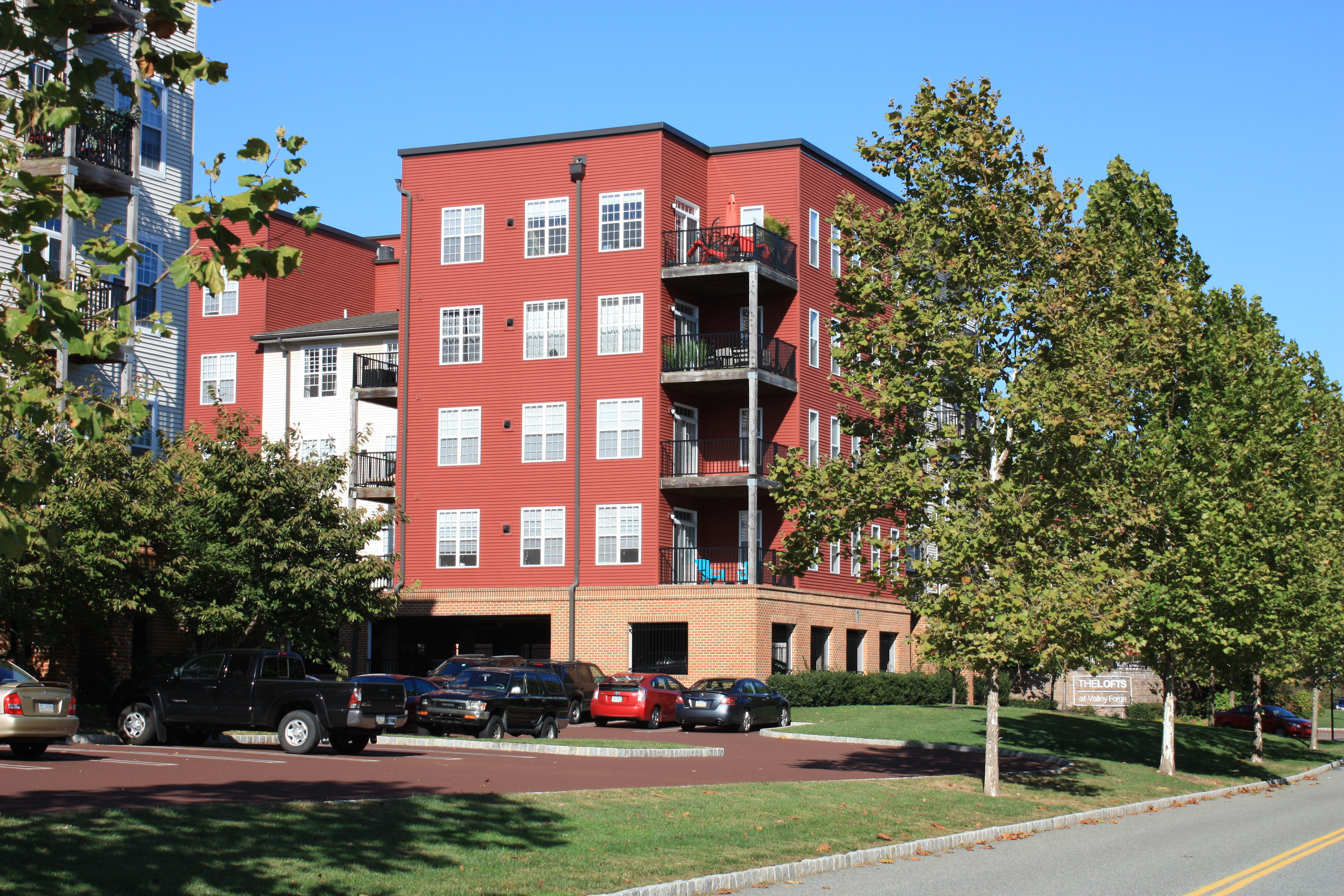
Living along the river in Betzwood.

Betzwood is the name of an area of West Norriton Township in Montgomery County, Pennsylvania. The area once housed the Lubin Studios, an early motion picture studio that operated here from 1912 to 1923.
