= Passyunk Avenue Bridge =

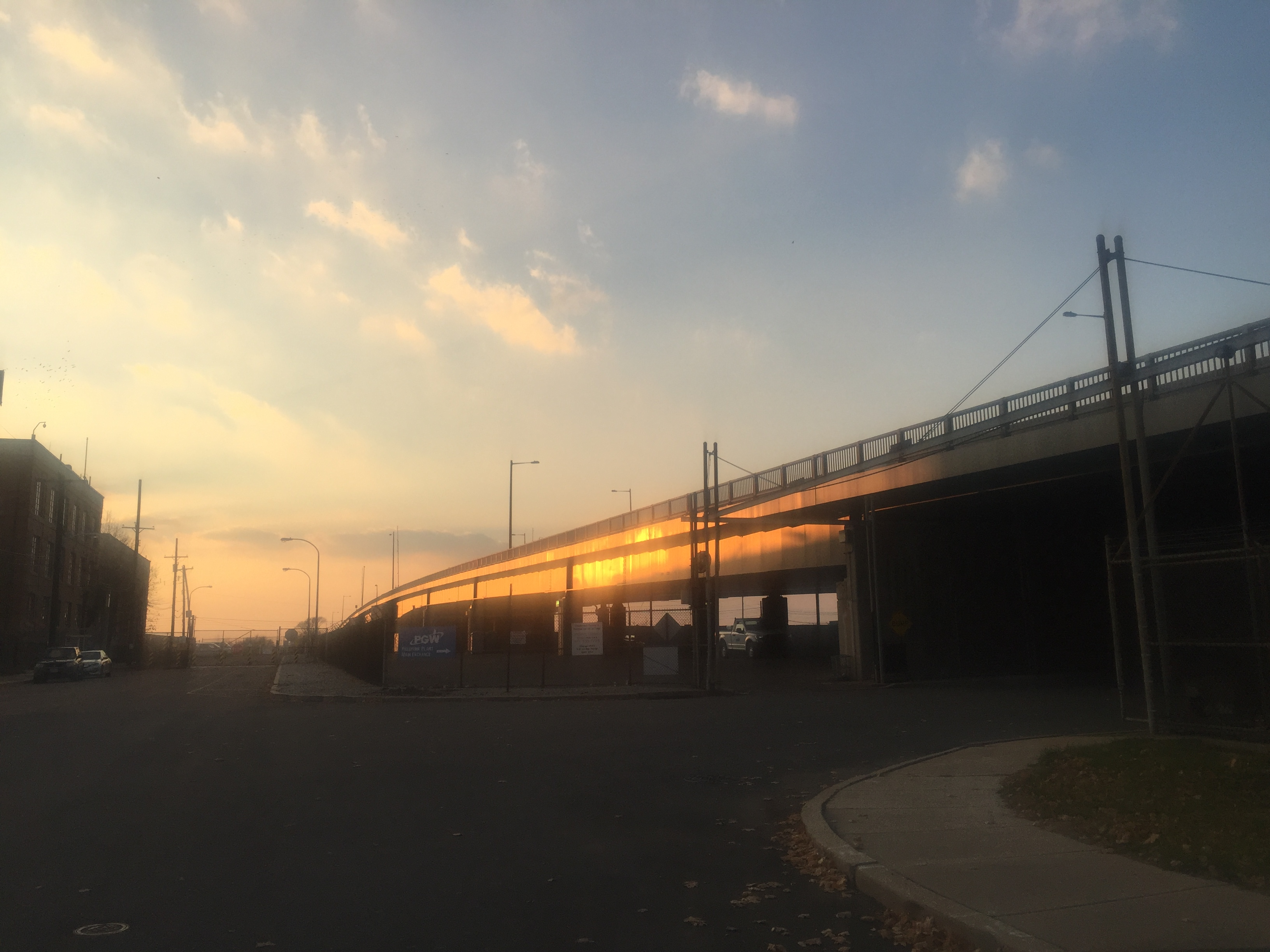
- Coordinates: 39.920°N 75.202°W
- Carries: 4 lanes of Passyunk Avenue and BicyclePA Route E
- Crosses: Schuylkill River
- Locale: Philadelphia, Pennsylvania
- ID number: NBI Structure Number: 673019007000000

Characteristics
- Design: Double leaf bascule bridge
- Total length: 2,240.2 feet (682.8 m)
- Width: 74.1 feet (22.6 m)

History
- Opened: 1983

Location
- Interactive map of Passyunk Avenue Bridge

The Passyunk Avenue Bridge is an American, double leaf bascule bridge that spans the Schuylkill River between South Philadelphia and the Southwest Philadelphia sections of the city of Philadelphia in the Commonwealth of Pennsylvania.

== History and architectural features ==
The current bridge was completed in 1983. It was built on an alignment slightly to the north of its predecessor, a two-lane double-leaf bascule bridge that dated to 1911.

== See also ==
- George C. Platt Bridge
- List of crossings of the Schuylkill River
- University Avenue Bridge, another bascule bridge in Philadelphia

== Gallery ==
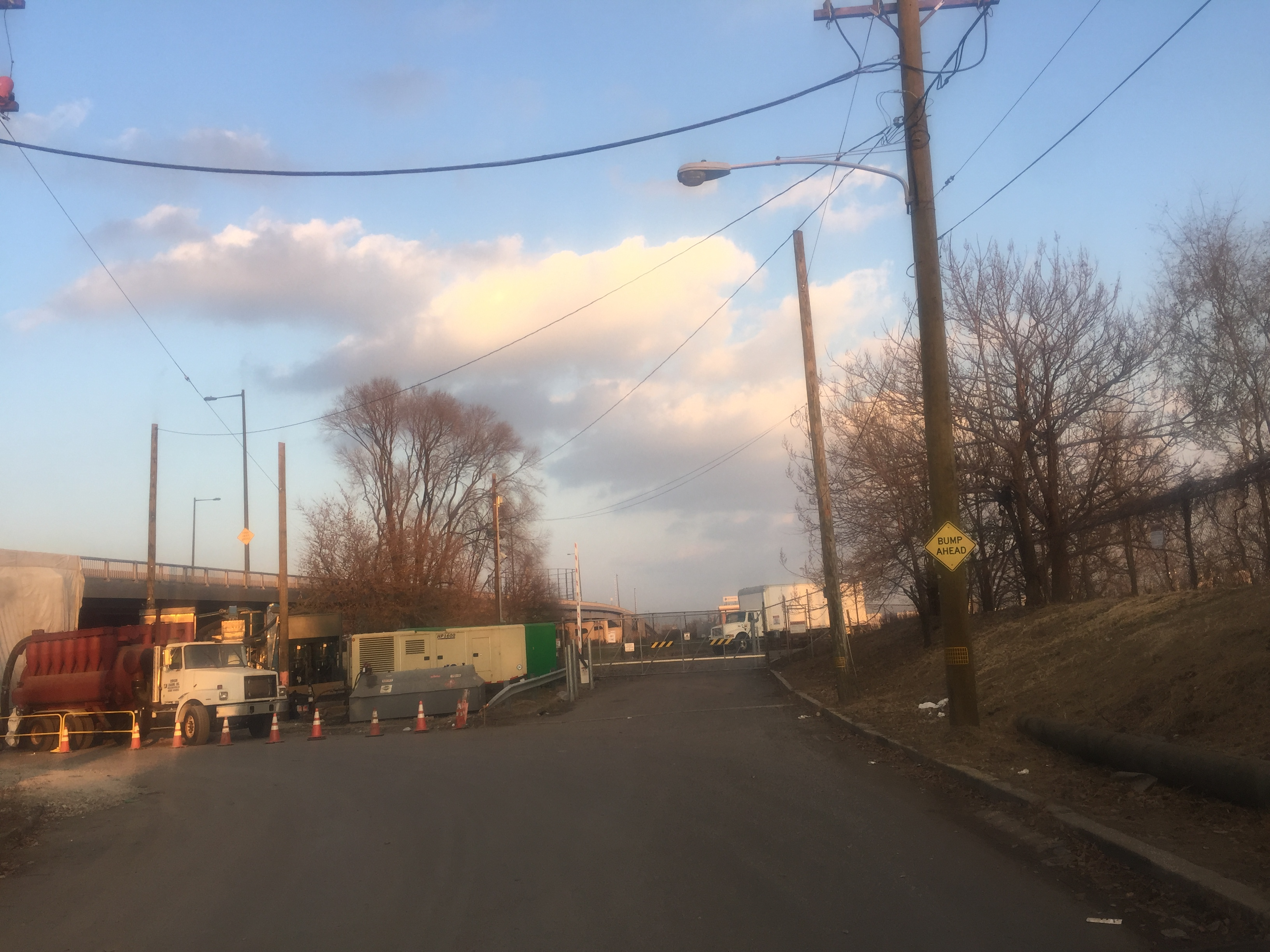
Passyunk Avenue Bridge from junkyard view
