= Fayette Street Bridge =

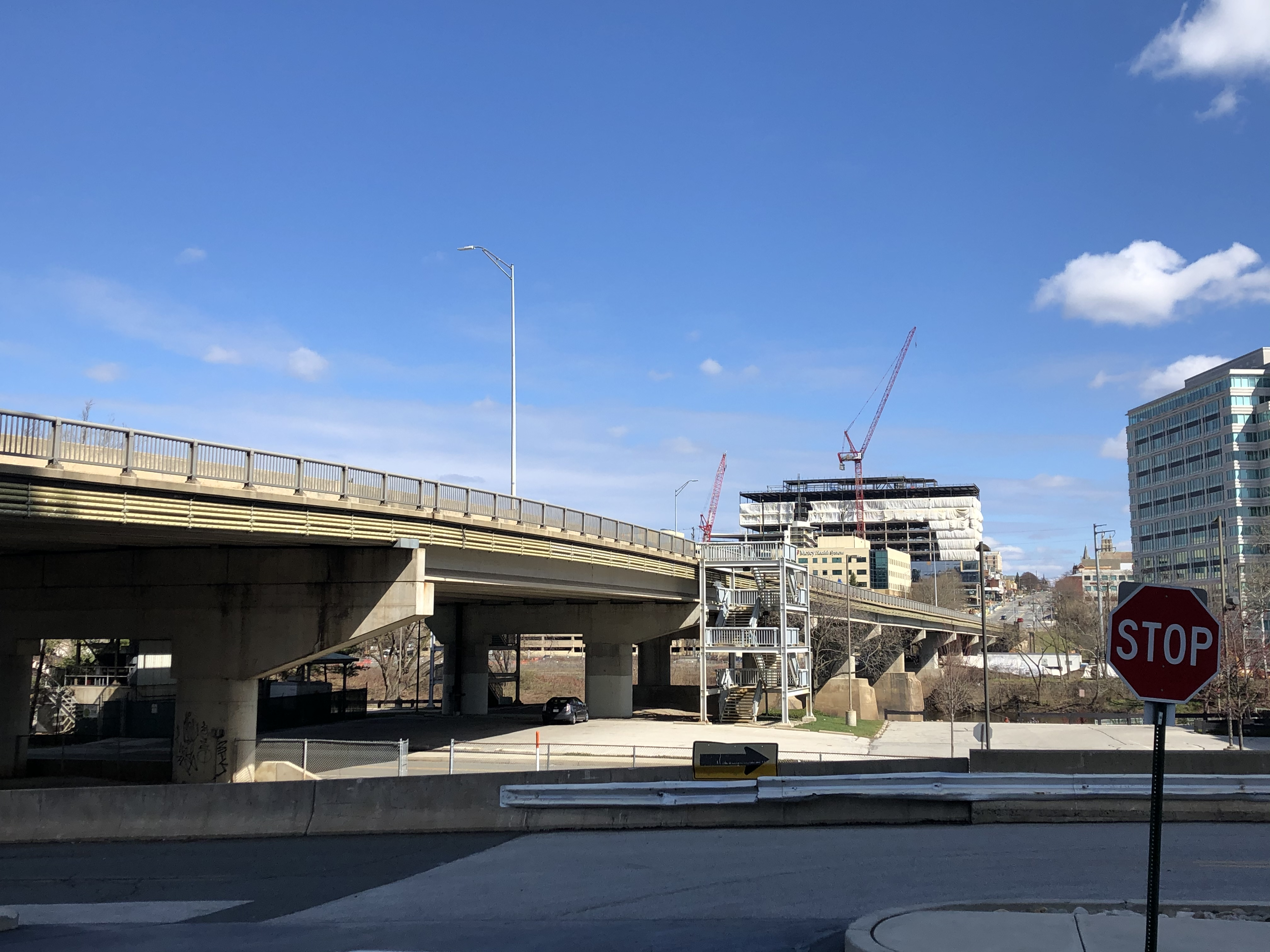
- Fayette Street Bridge
- Coordinates: 40°04′14″N 75°18′34″W
- Carries: Fayette Street
- Crosses: Schuylkill River
- Locale: Conshohocken / West Conshohocken, Pennsylvania

Characteristics
- Material: Steel
- Total length: 1305.2 feet
- Width: 67.6 feet

History
- Opened: 1918, 1987

Location
- Interactive map of Fayette Street Bridge

The Fayette Street Bridge is a bridge that connects Conshohocken with West Conshohocken, Pennsylvania across the Schuylkill River. This bridge is also known as the Matsonford Bridge.

== See also ==
- List of crossings of the Schuylkill River
