= Falls Bridge =

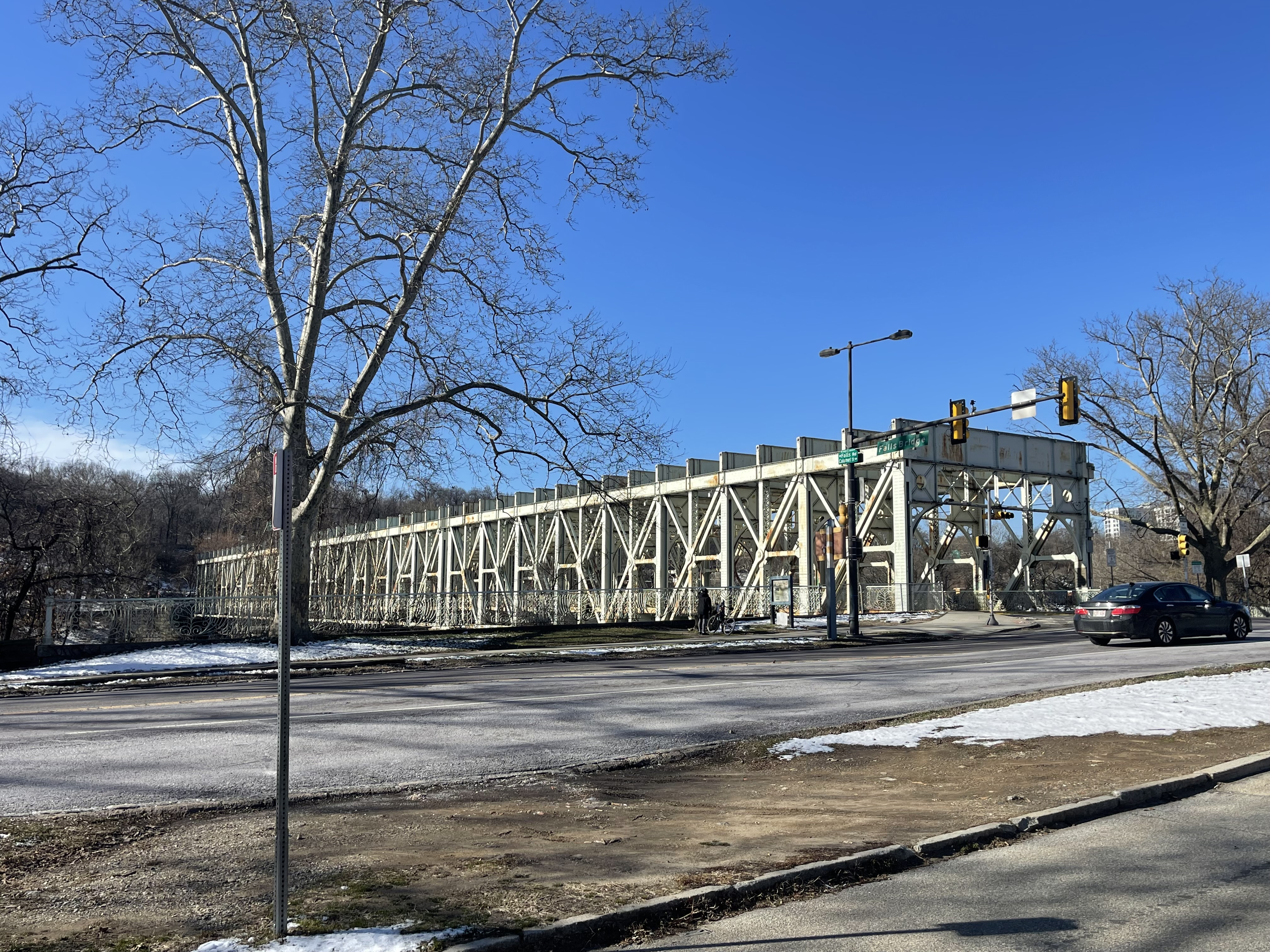
- Coordinates: 40.00833°N 75.19833°W
- Carries: 2 lanes of Calumet Street
- Crosses: Schuylkill River
- Locale: Fairmount Park, Philadelphia
- Official name: Falls Bridge

Characteristics
- Design: Steel Pratt truss
- Total length: 556 feet (169 m)
- Width: 25.9 feet (7.9 m)
- Longest span: 191.9 feet (58.5 m)
- Clearance above: 17.2 feet (5.2 m)

History
- Opened: June 1895

Statistics
- Daily traffic: 13,000 (1981)
- Toll: none

The Falls Bridge is a steel Pratt truss bridge that spans the Schuylkill River in Fairmount Park in Philadelphia, Pennsylvania. It connects Kelly (formerly East River) Drive at Calumet Street with Martin Luther King, Jr. (formerly West River) Drive at Neill Drive. It replaced a wooden covered bridge at the same site.

The 556-foot-long (169 m) bridge, with stonemasonry abutments and two stonemasonry piers, with three Pratt-type pin-connected trusses, was built in 1894–1895 at a cost of $262,000 by Filbert Porter & Co. under the direction of Chief Engineer George Smedley Webster (1855–1931) of the Philadelphia Department of Public Works and James H. Windrim, director of the Department of Public Works. The bridge was designed as a double-decker bridge, but the upper deck was never built for lack of funds. The bridge carries two lanes of vehicular traffic on a 26-foot-wide (7.9 m) roadway, with 7-foot (2.1 m) sidewalks on either side, for a total width of 40 feet (12 m).

In 2007, blue LED lights were added to highlight the bridge at night.

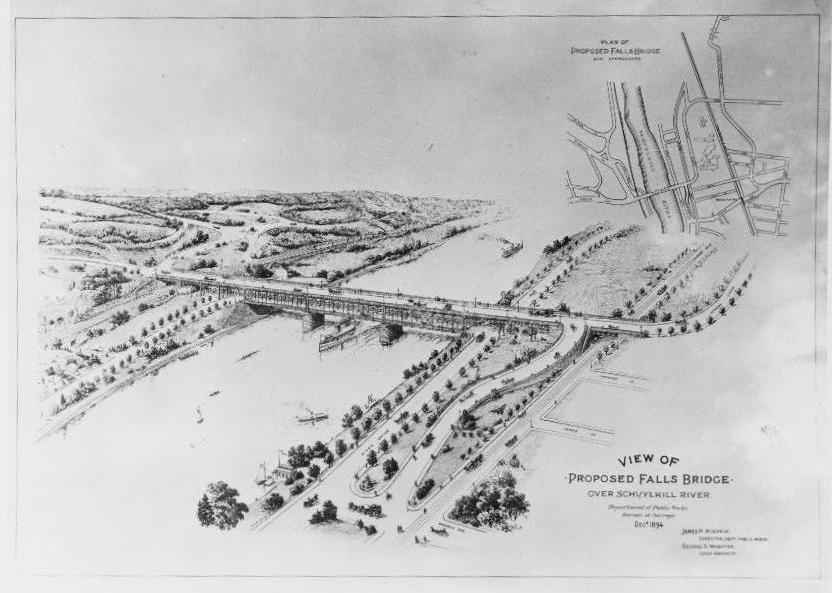
"View of Proposed Falls Bridge" (1894)

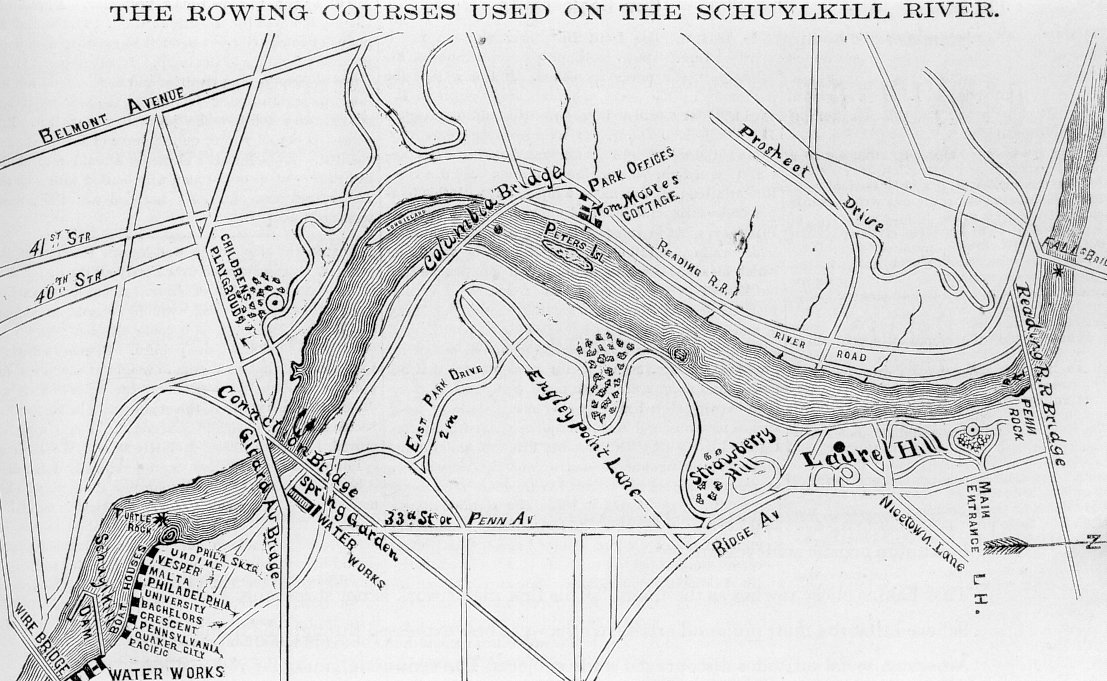
Note the Reading Railroad Bridge and the Falls (Covered) Bridge in this 1872 map.

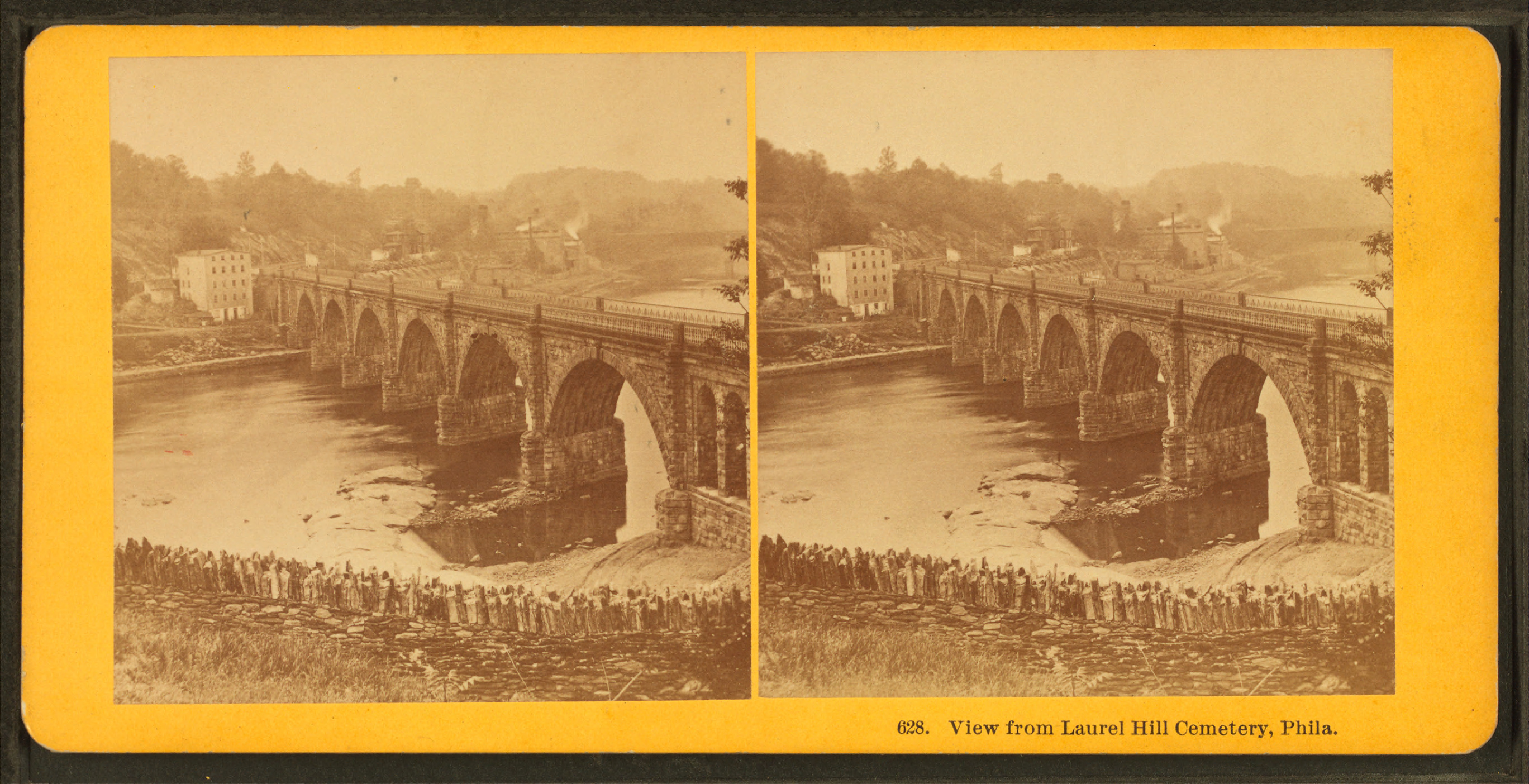
"View from Laurel Hill Cemetery." Reading Railroad Bridge, with Falls (Covered) Bridge in the distance (circa 1880s).

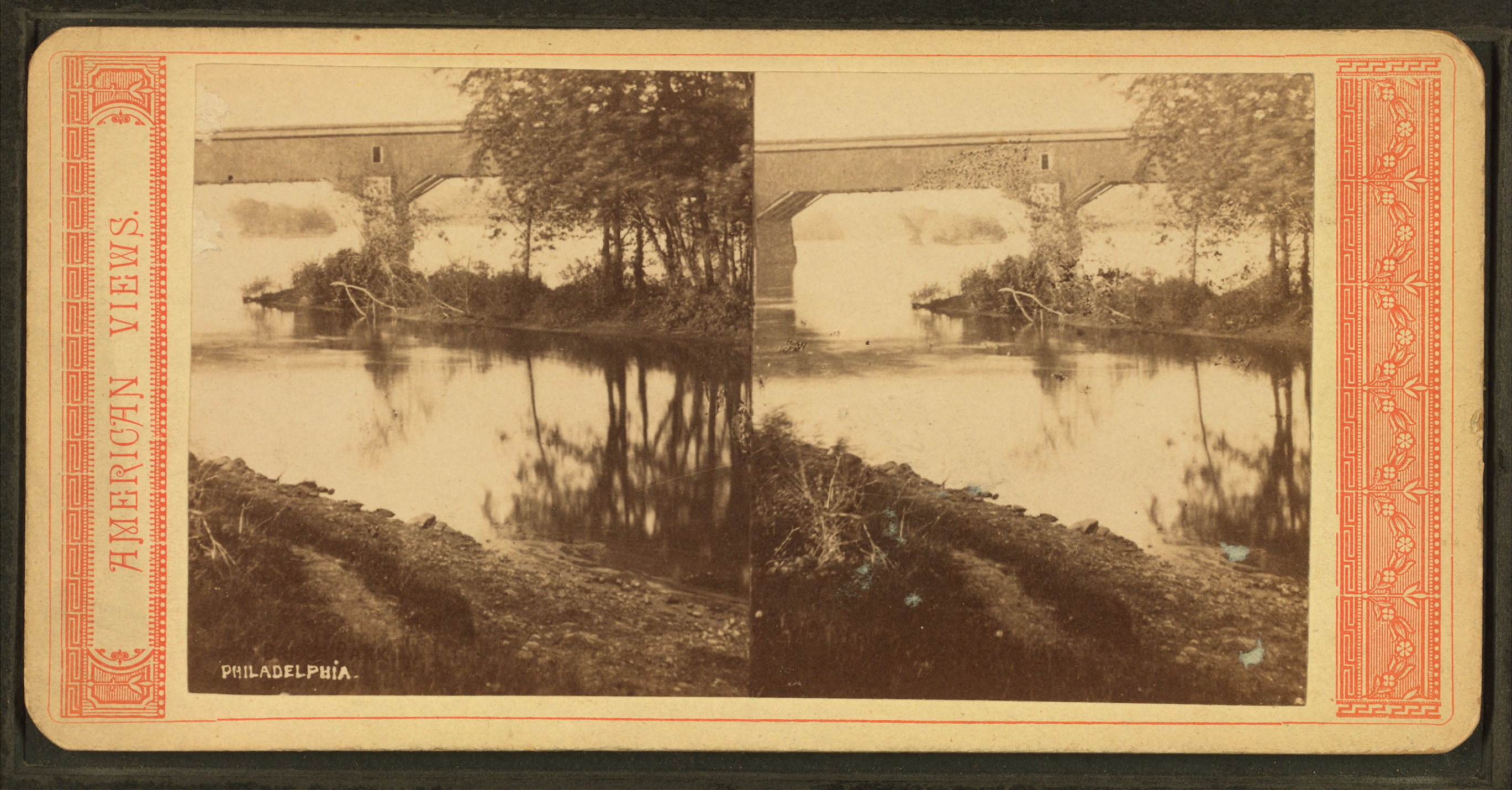
"Philadelphia. (Bridge over the Schuylkill River)", undated. This photograph may show the Falls (Covered) Bridge.

== See also ==
- List of bridges documented by the Historic American Engineering Record in Pennsylvania
- List of crossings of the Schuylkill River
