= Mingo, Pennsylvania =

Unincorporated village in Pennsylvania, U.S.

Coordinates: 40°10′07″N 75°31′24″W

Mingo is an unincorporated village in Upper Providence Township, Montgomery County, Pennsylvania, United States, just southeast of Royersford close to the Schuylkill River.

Mingo had a Post Office from 1880 to 1883.
