= Philadelphia & Reading Railroad Mule Bridge =

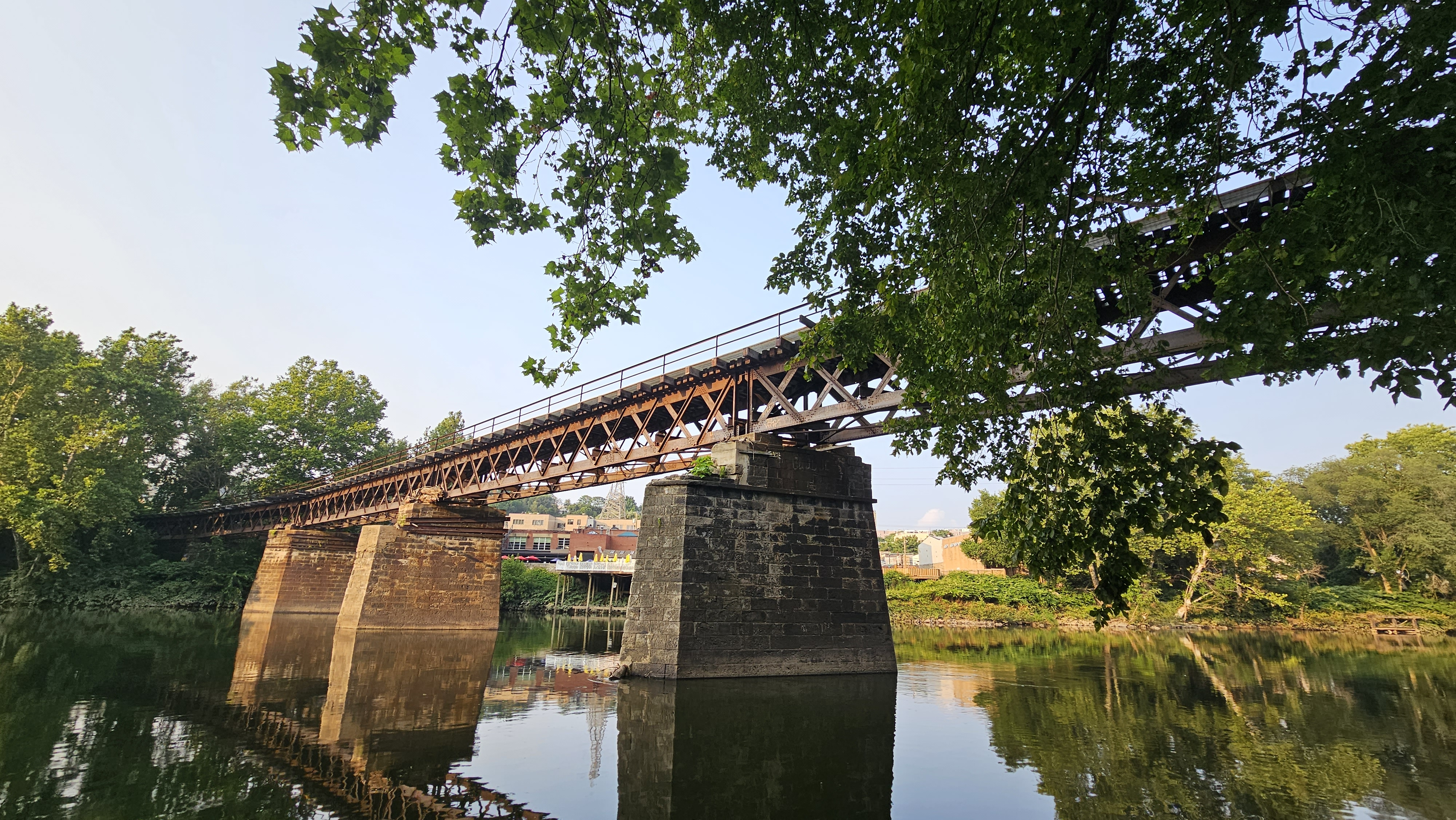
- The Mule Bridge in 2023
- Coordinates: 40°01′19″N 75°13′10″W
- Carries: Philadelphia & Reading Railroad, Venice Branch
- Crosses: Schuylkill River
- Locale: Philadelphia/Bala Cynwyd, Pennsylvania

Characteristics
- Material: Wrought iron
- Total length: 623 feet (190 m)

History
- Opened: 1889, altered 1943

The Mule Bridge spans the Schuylkill River in Pennsylvania, connecting Venice Island in Manayunk, Philadelphia, with Bala Cynwyd. It was built by the Philadelphia & Reading Railroad in 1889.

The bridge is significant because it is one of Philadelphia's oldest metal railroad bridges, and a rare surviving example of a wrought-iron lattice truss.

The last freight train crossed the bridge in April 4 2017.

In the early 2020s, the possibility of converting the Mule Bridge to carry pedestrian and bicycle traffic, to connect the existing trails adjacent to it on both banks, was discussed.

== Gallery ==
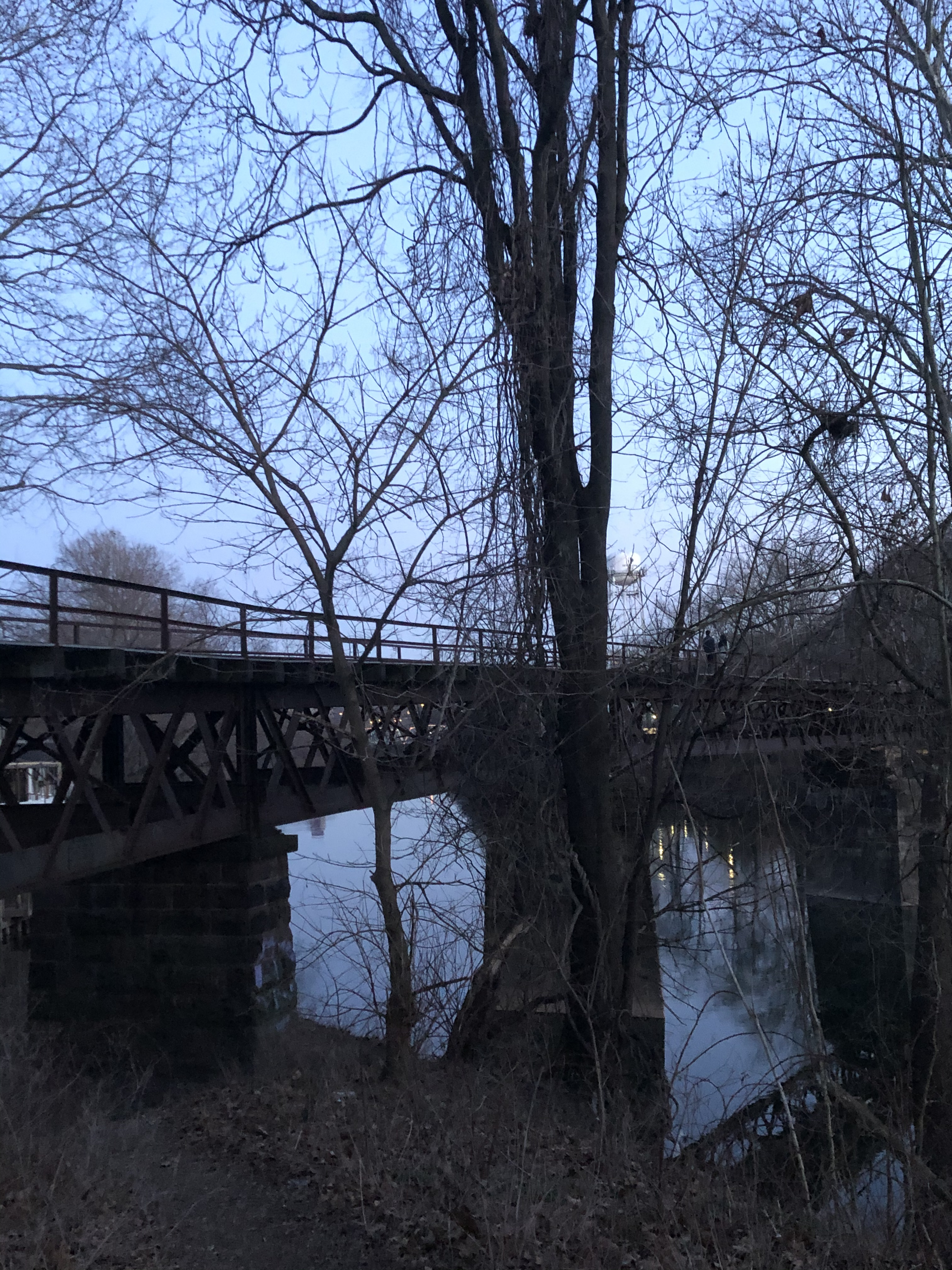
The Mule Bridge

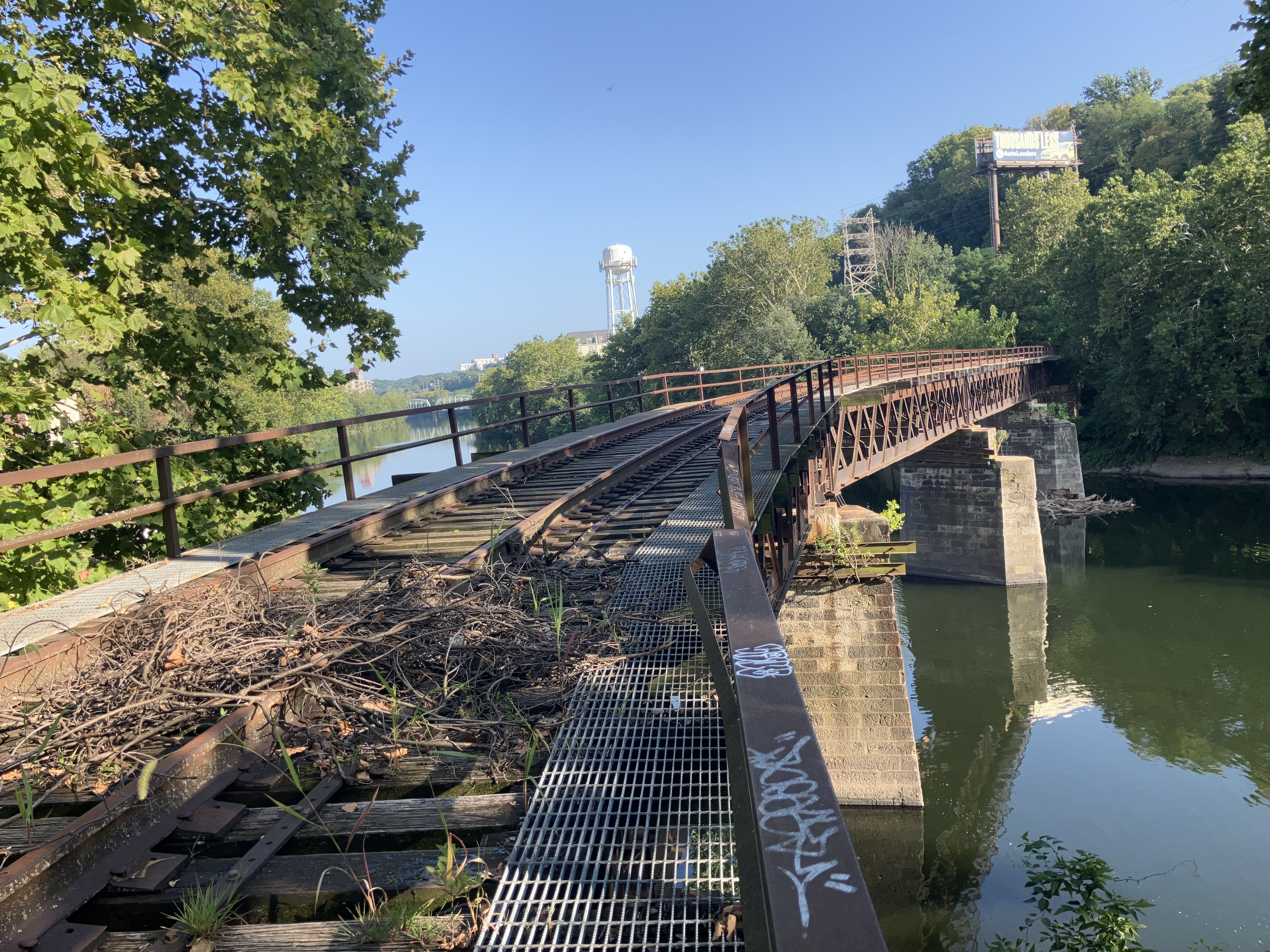
A view in August 2025, looking toward the west bank.

== See also ==
- List of bridges documented by the Historic American Engineering Record in Pennsylvania
- List of crossings of the Schuylkill River
