= Unionville, Berks County, Pennsylvania =

Unincorporated community in Pennsylvania, US

Unionville, Pennsylvania
- Unincorporated community
- Location within Pennsylvania
- Coordinates: 40°14′43″N 75°42′42″W
- Country: United States
- State: Pennsylvania
- County: Berks
- Township: Union
- Elevation: 164 ft (50 m)
- Time zone: UTC-5 (Eastern (EST))
  - Summer (DST): UTC-4 (EDT)
- Area codes: 610 and 484
- GNIS feature ID: 1190190

Unionville is an unincorporated community in Union Township in Berks County, Pennsylvania, United States. Unionville is located at the intersection of Pennsylvania Route 724 and Unionville Road, south of the Schuylkill River.
