= Pencoyd Bridge (Pennsylvania) =

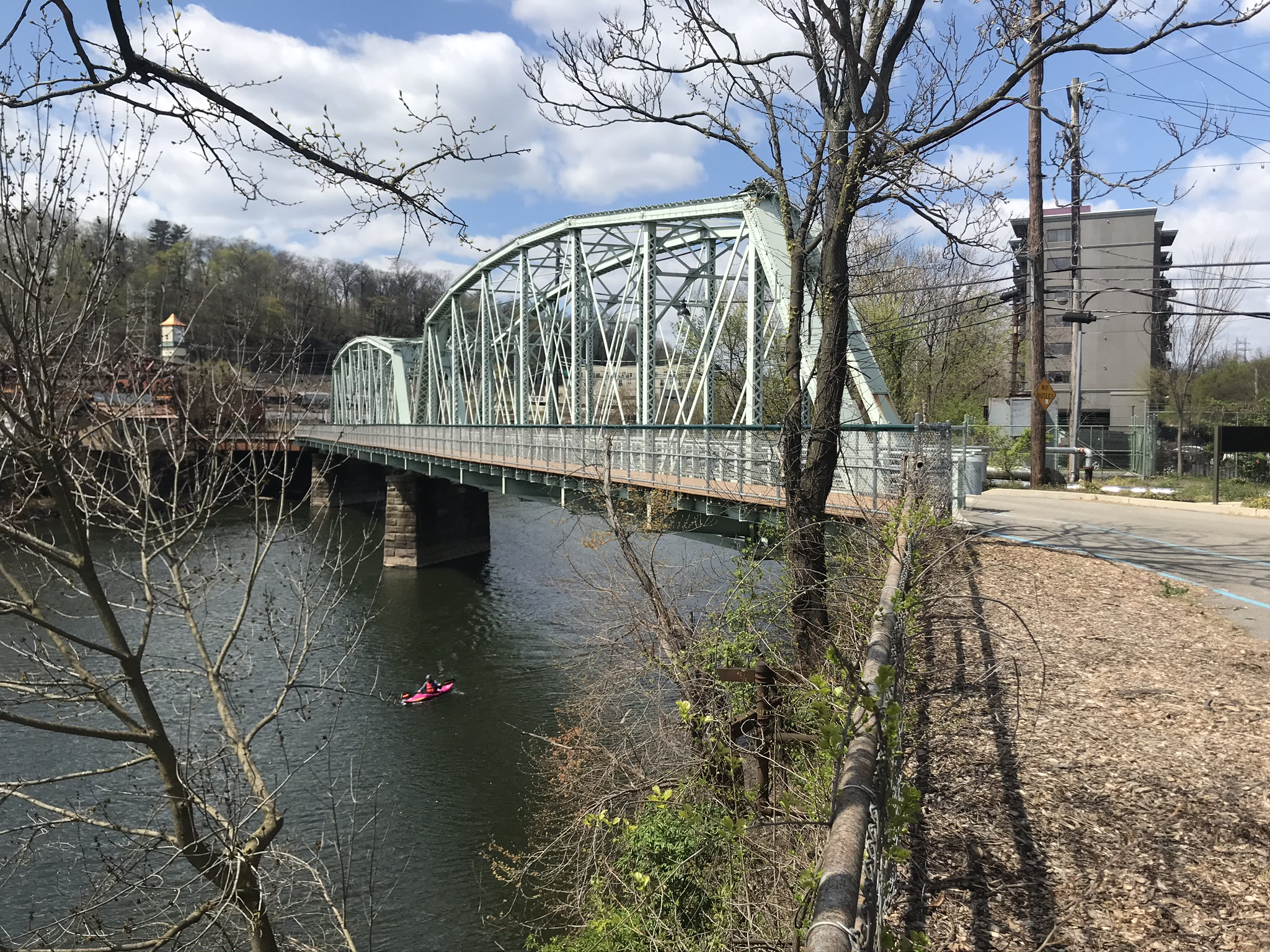
- Pencoyd Bridge in 2020
- Coordinates: 40°01′00″N 75°12′48″W
- Carries: Cynwyd Heritage Trail
- Crosses: Schuylkill River
- Locale: Philadelphia/Bala Cynwyd, Pennsylvania

Characteristics
- Material: Steel

History
- Opened: 1900

Location
- Interactive map of Pencoyd Bridge

The Pencoyd Bridge was a former Pennsylvania Railroad industrial spur serving Pencoyd Iron Works and local industries from Schuylkill Branch. It is now part of the Cynwyd Heritage Trail and connects Bala Cynwyd with Manayunk. The bridge was redeveloped and reopened in 2016 as a bicycle trail. The project was funded by the MLP Ventures.

== See also ==
- List of crossings of the Schuylkill River
