= Barbadoes Island (Pennsylvania) =

Island in Pennsylvania, United States

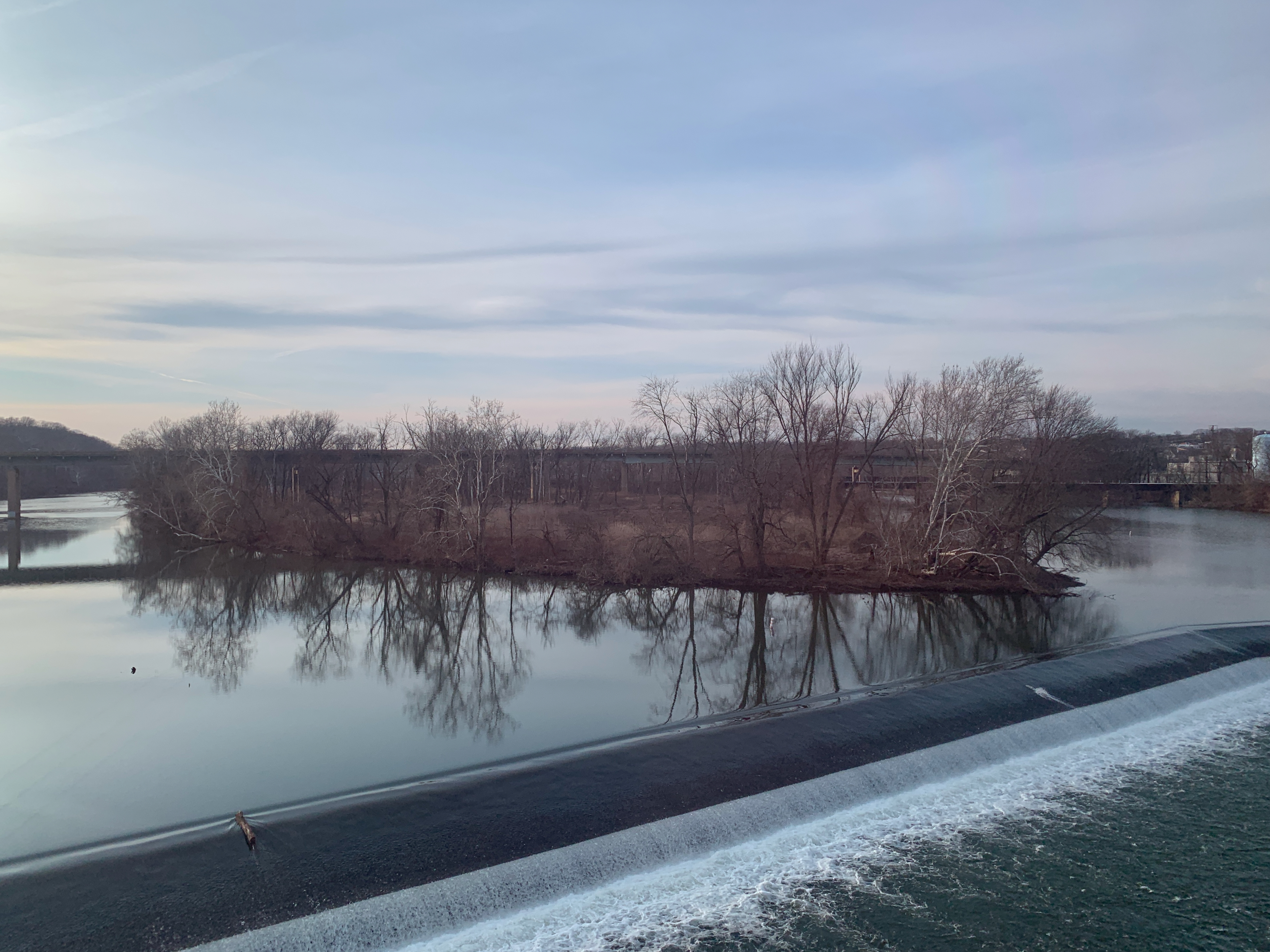
- The southeast end of Barbadoes Island as seen from the Norristown High Speed Line
- Interactive map of Barbadoes Island

Geography
- Location: Schuylkill River
- Coordinates: 40.1135°N 75.3566°W
- Area: 90 acres (36 ha)

Administration
- United States
- State: Pennsylvania
- County: Montgomery County
- Township: West Norriton Township, Pennsylvania

Demographics
- Population: None

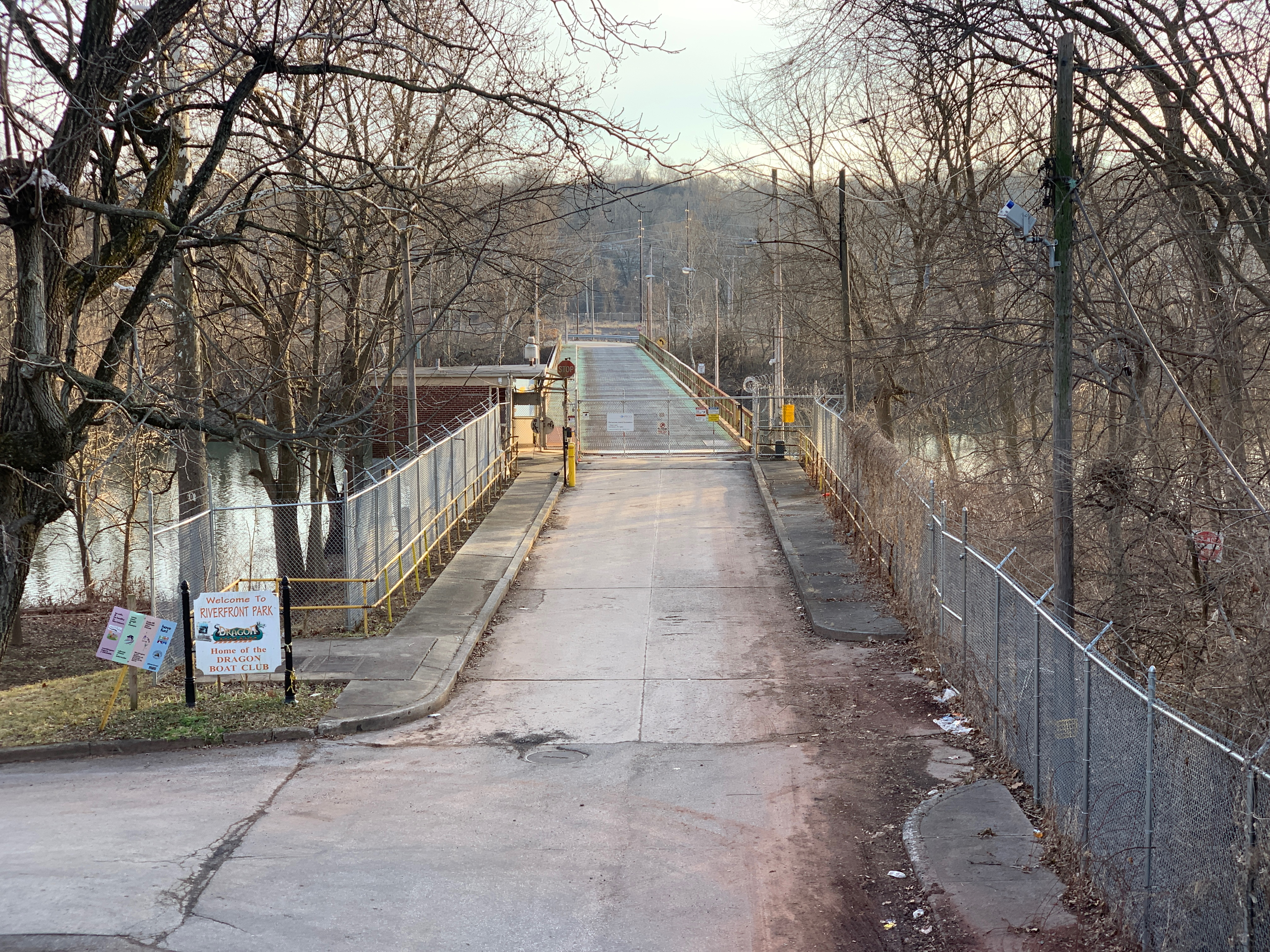
The private Haws Avenue bridge is the only road access to the island. (US 202 crosses the island but has no exit)

Barbadoes Island is an island in the Schuylkill River in West Norriton Township, south of Norristown in Montgomery County, Pennsylvania, United States. Southbound U.S. Route 202 and various localized rail lines cross over the eastern tip of the island. It is about 90 acres (36 ha) in size.

== History ==
=== 18th century ===
Barbadoes Island was part of the original land grants made to William Penn. In the 1700s, the University of Pennsylvania acquired title to Barbados Island. The name of Barbadoes Island may reflect a trade relationship between Philadelphia and Barbados, an island in the West Indies that was also under British control at one time. Wealthy planters from the Caribbean isle sent their children to Philadelphia to be educated.

=== 19th century ===
During the early 1800s, John Markley purchased Barbadoes Island, where he cut down a number of trees in order to farm the land and build a home. Regular events held on the island during the summers prior to 1820 included horse races and parades by local militia units. Sometime between the early to mid-1800s, Philadelphia area entrepreneur Lewis Schrack also opened a boat and fishing tackle business and erected "floating baths," a series of wood structures with stone floors with opens that allowed the river water to flow in and out.

Between 1840 and 1910, pleasure steamboats carried excursionists to the island and up to Phoenixville from a wharf in Norristown. In August 1849, a large gathering was held on the island to celebrate the end of a global cholera epidemic.

In 1880, Isaac McHorse planted a large wheat field on eighty acres of island land that he had leased. He imported a steam thresher by ferry in order to harvest his crop.

=== 20th century ===
The island continued to be used as a "pleasure park" by children and adults between 1910 and 1920, and was often accessed by skiffs and other small boats.

The island was subsequently purchased in 1922 by Counties Gas and Electric Company, which later merged with Philadelphia Electric Company, now known as PECO. A power plant was constructed on the island in 1926. Power plants fueled by gas, coal, and oil occupied the island in post-World War II era until recently.

In 1961, PECO erected the largest gas turbine in the United States. Built by Westinghouse Electric Corporation, the island turbine was a 22,000-kilowatt, remote controlled unit.

The plant was originally coal-powered, then converted to diesel power in the 1970s. It was operated by the Philadelphia Electric Company until 1997.

=== 21st century ===
The PECO facility was most recently used for equipment storage, company training and as an electrical substation. On February 16, 2009, Exelon demolished the old power plant.
