= Mont Clare, Pennsylvania =

Unincorporated community in Pennsylvania, US

Mont Clare formerly Quincyville
- census-designated place
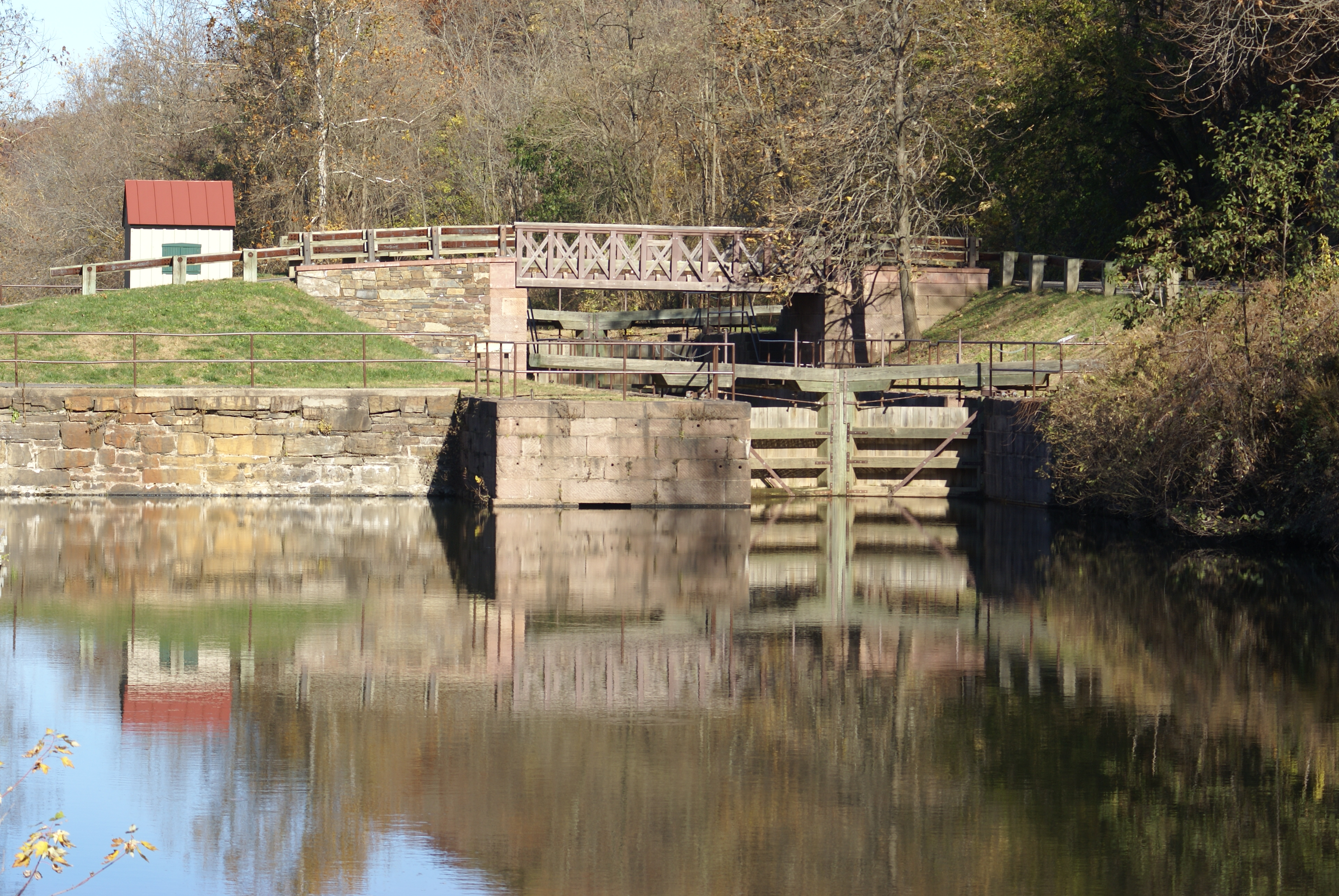
- Schuylkill Canal Lock 60 in Mont Clare
- Etymology: Mont Clare/Clair from poet Bayard Taylor
- Location of Mont Clare in Pennsylvania
- Coordinates: 40°08′10″N 75°30′24″W
- Country: United States
- State: Pennsylvania
- County: Montgomery
- Township: Upper Providence

Population (2020)
  - Total: 1,852
- Time zone: UTC-5 (Eastern Standard Time)
  - Summer (DST): UTC-4 (Eastern Daylight Time)
- ZIP Code: 19453
- Area codes: 484 and 610

Mont Clare is a village in Upper Providence Township, Montgomery County, Pennsylvania. The village is located on the left bank of the Schuylkill River opposite Phoenixville and Chester County. Mont Clare is at the site of the former Jacobs' ford. Mont Clare hosts the only functional lock and one of only two remaining watered stretches of the Schuylkill Canal. Mont Clare was the birthplace of the infamous outlaw the Sundance Kid. As of the 2020 United States census the population was 1,852.

The village was originally named Quincyville and has also been spelled Quinzyville, Mont Clair, and Montclare.

== History ==
Prior to the European colonization of the Americas, there was an aboriginal American encampment or village on the site, of the Unami speaking Lenni-Lenape tribe. All but a few individuals had vacated the area by 1773.

=== Colonial and Revolutionary War eras ===
The site's original English colonization was as part of the Duke of York's holdings. In 1681, King Charles II granted the land to William Penn, creating the Province of Pennsylvania. The site became part of Penn's Manor of Gilberts, as well as part of Philadelphia County. In 1729, Providence Township was created out of much of the Manor, including the site.

The earliest recorded resident of European descent on the site appears to have been Patrick Gordon, who settled in Providence Township, along the Schuylkill in what is now Mont Clare. This Gordon was Deputy Governor of the province of Pennsylvania from 1726, until his death in 1736.

In 1761, another Patrick Gordon, relation to Deputy Governor Gordon unknown, leased a "plantation" from the sons of William Penn. This Gordon lived in an improved cave in the hill below where the Mont Clare railroad station would be located over 100 years later. Newspaper accounts show him to be living in the vicinity as early as 1757. He was reportedly unmarried and owned female slaves which lived in the cave with him. Those newspaper notices show he also came into possession of his neighbor's livestock on occasion.

In Colonial America, the ford drew traffic through Quincyville. Bean's History of Montgomery County Pennsylvania suggests Quincyville was the location of Joseph Richardson's 1766 licensed inn.

The ford was used by American and British troops during the American Revolutionary War. In Fall 1777, Lord Cornwallis' troops forced a passage of the ford. This move ultimately led to the British taking Philadelphia. Gordon's Cave became the site of a very minor American victory when a British squad tarried there to liberate a roasting goose and were captured by militia.

In 1784, Philadelphia County was split and the village became part of the newly formed Montgomery County.

On December 3, 1785, 700 acres (280 ha) of land at what is now Mont Clare, were sold by John Penn and John Penn Jr., grandsons of William Penn, to Quaker John Jacobs for £2,600. The first Jacobs to live on the property was colonial Assemblyman and future Representative at the 2nd United States Congress, Israel Jacobs.

In 1805, Providence Township was split along the Perkiomen Creek, leaving the village in the newly formed Upper Providence Township.

=== Canal era ===
In the 1820s, the construction of the Oakes Reach canal, of the "Schuylkill Navigation", through the village brought more commerce and traffic. The 3.5-mile (5.6 km) Oakes Reach started in Mont Clare, ran down past neighboring Port Providence, and reentered the river at Oaks. Black Rock Dam, Lock 60 and a house for its lock tender were built in Mont Clare. In the mid-20th century, the lower mile was filled in when the river was dredged, however the upper portion was kept watered at the insistence of Mont Clare and Port Providence residents who use it for recreation.

In the winter of 1843–1844, Joseph Whitaker, ironmaster and state legislator from Phoenixville, obtained a charter for the first Mont Clare Bridge. Starting in the summer of 1844, the bridge was constructed to replace the ford. In 1846, Whitaker sold his interest in the Phoenix Iron Works and moved across the river to Quincyville to land he had purchased there. Whitaker built a dwelling and a steam saw mill. Whitaker's residence was named Mont Clare (or Montclair, see below) at the 1847 suggestion of poet Bayard Taylor, setting the stage for the future name of the village.

By 1859, Quincyville consisted of "an inn, store, steam saw mill, lumberyard, and seventeen houses. There was formerly an iron foundry and machine shop here, which ha[d] been converted to a paper mill". "There was also a post office here, which was discontinued in the spring of 1858."

The post office reopened from 1861 to 1868, but with the name Mont Clare. Through the 1870s, the village name transitioned from Quincyville to Mont Clare (see below).

=== Rail era ===
Between 1882 and 1884, the Pennsylvania Schuylkill Valley Railroad was completed between Philadelphia and Reading with a station in Mont Clare. The line comes up from Philadelphia on the river bluff then turns out above the northern part of Mont Clare on a high viaduct that then crosses the Schuylkill River into Phoenixville. The line crosses what was the front yard of the Mont Clare estate house. Fortunately the house has an equal rear entryway, so they moved the driveway to the former back door. In 1900, the Pennsylvania Railroad (PRR) combined the line with five other subsidiaries to form the Schuylkill and Juniata Railroad. In 1902, the PRR eliminated the subsidiaries and took direct ownership of the line. In late 1906, an express train derailed in Mont Clare, narrowly avoiding plunging into the river and any loss of life. PRR discontinued the Mont Clare station between 1955 and 1958. After the PRR successor, Penn Central's, failure and the takeover of its successor, Conrail, the line now belongs to Norfolk Southern, who used it for freight. After two years of no local use, the line was formally taken out of service at the end of 2007. As of 2009 one rail has been observed to be disconnected just south of the Bridge Street(PA 29) overpass in Mont Clare. The line is part of the alignment in the moribund Schuylkill Valley Metro light rail proposal, and the more recent, and less ambitious, Green Line rail proposal. Both proposals would reestablish rail service from Mont Clare to Philadelphia, via Norristown and Paoli, respectively.

In 1886, the Mont Clare Post Office was reopened, although it took the name Montclare from 1895 to 1905. The Post Office remained open until the decline of small post offices at the end of the 20th century. Eventually Mont Clare was assigned the ZIP Code 19453. At the end, the Post Office was located at the eastern corner of Bridge and Walnut Streets in a small storefront in an apartment building. The Mont Clare Post Office finally closed again near the turn of the 21st century. Village mail is delivered by the Phoenixville Post Office to the still active 19453 ZIP Code, as well as to the Phoenixville Post Office's own 19460 ZIP code area, which entirely surrounds 19453.

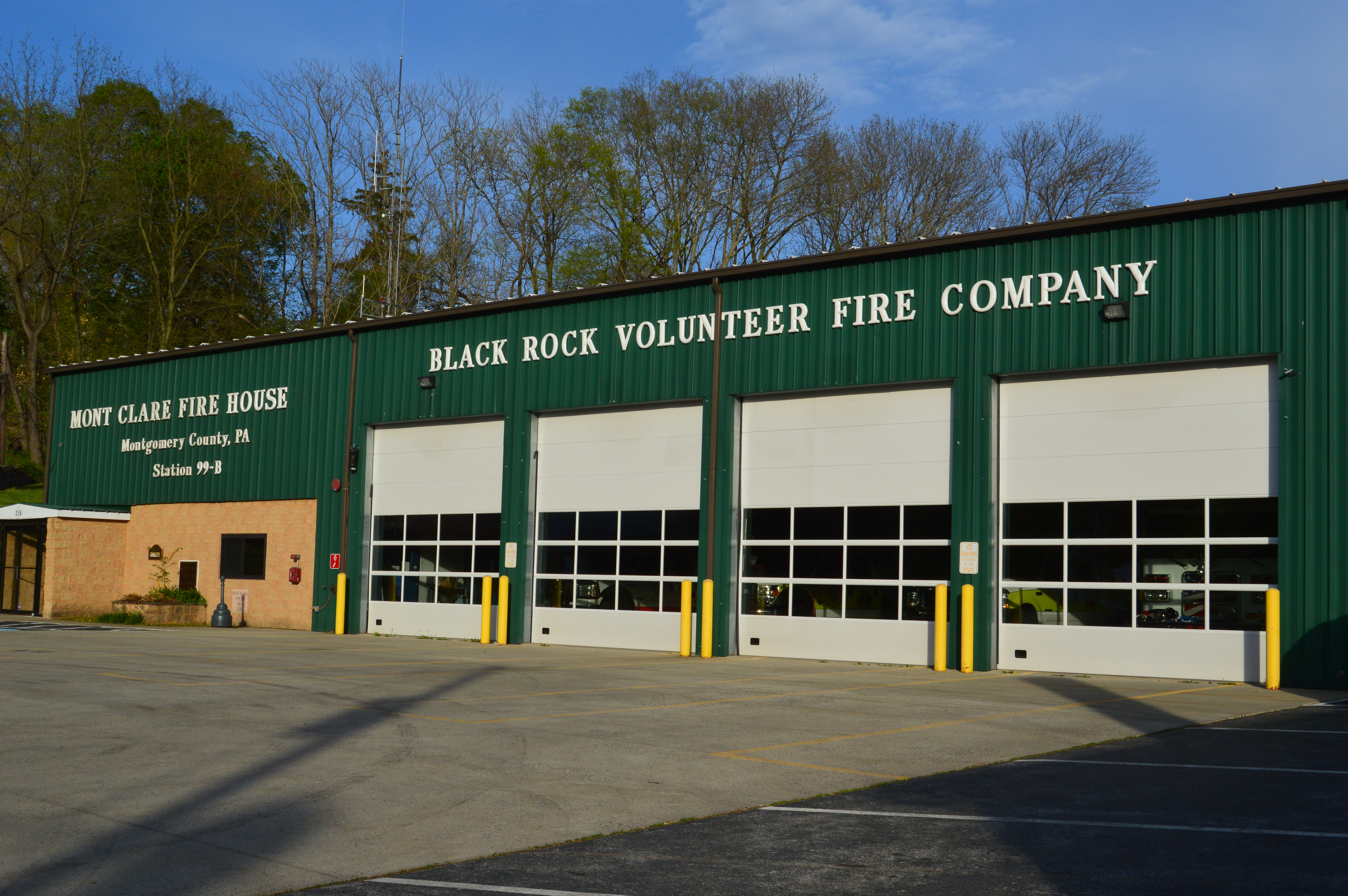
Mont Clare firehouse on Bridge Street in 2015

In 1900, the volunteer Mont Clare Fire Company was formed. Chartered in 1910, Company 55 celebrated their 100th anniversary in 2010. Besides traditional fire and rescue, they have water rescue units with boats and divers, reflecting the river and canal location of Mont Clare. In 2012, under economic pressure from the township, the Company merged with the volunteer Oaks Fire Company to form the Black Rock Volunteer Fire Company, Montgomery County Station 99. The Black Rock Company continued operations from the Mont Clare and Oaks fire houses for many years. Circa 2021 the firehouse signage and many vehicles were removed.

=== Village names ===
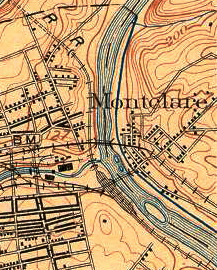
1906 Topographic Map of Mont Clare

The village gradually changed its name from Quincyville to Mont Clare in the latter half of the 19th century, adopting the name of the estate of one of its most prominent residents. An early recognition was the naming of the reopened village Post Office as "Mont Clare" in 1861. In 1871 and 1872 atlases, the village is still labeled Quincyville, but Samuel W. Pennypacker refers to only Mont Clare in his 1872 Annals of Phoenixville and Its Vicinity. An 1873 map shows it as Mont Clare. In an 1877 atlas, it is shown as "Mt. Clare", but that atlas' included history of Upper Providence refers to it as "Quincyville or Mont Clare" and "Quincyville, perhaps better known as Mont Clare". There is a story that the railroad dubbing the local station Montclair after Whitaker's estate was the source of the name change. However the railroad and its Mont Clare station were constructed in the 1880s, well after the name appeared beyond the estate. Some references show both names simultaneously. The county map in Bean's 1884 history shows Mont Clare on the river and Quincyville as an adjacent village, inland. Harley's 1881 history refers to both names individually in a list of Upper Providence villages. So while there is some possibility there were once two villages, the 1871 and 1877 atlases are the most detailed and both have insets detailing the property ownership of the same village on the river, but with the name changed. The 1895 atlas has no mention of Quincyville.

The spellings of the village's names are the subject of some historical debate. There are several 1850s references to Quinzyville, including legislation and Post Office lists. [Note: A version of Bean's History on the web names it Quineyville, but this is a transcription error.] An 1895 article in The Philadelphia Inquirer claims that Bayard Taylor spelled the estate's name Mont Clair 48 years previously and notes the railroad company's using the spelling Mont Clare might be due to a "blind guess" that would be "near enough to pass". Yet Pennypacker, who grew up in his grandfather's Mont Clare estate, consistently spells the name Mont Clare in his Annals of Phoenixville and attributes the estate's name to Bayard with that spelling. But Phoebe H. Gilkyson, a Whitaker great-granddaughter and later resident of the estate, refers to the house as Montclair in her papers. In any event, Mont Clare is the modern spelling listed by both the USPS and GNIS, although the latter lists Montclare as a variant, as used on the map below. In 2012, GNIS added Quincyville, Quinzyville, and Mont Clair as additional variant names for Mont Clare, based on this article and its references.

=== Historical maps ===
- 1849 Map of Montgomery County - Showing bridge, but not many residences in the village
- 1871 Map of Quincyville and Upper Providence Township
- 1877 Map of "Mt. Clare" and Upper Providence Township
- 1884 Map of Montgomery County EnlargedOriginal

== Geography ==
Mont Clare is located inside a bend of the Schuylkill River, which forms the western and southern sides of the village. The village is at a historical ford and present day bridge. Originally settled between the river and a bluff, the village has expanded northeastward up the bluff along Bridge Street (Pennsylvania Route 29). The lower part of Mont Clare is in the river flood plain.

In 1995, Montgomery County designated the Mont Clare Cliffs and Ravines as a natural area "priority site". Extending upriver from Mont Clare along the Schuylkill, this series of "steep cliffs and deeply etched ravines" are formed by the intersection of hard Lockatong Formation argillites with the river.

== Arts and culture ==
Mont Clare is primarily a residential community. The village has two churches: the Holy Archangel Michael Byzantine Catholic Church (locally known as St. Michael's) and the Otterbein United Methodist Church. A ten-minute walk across the bridge accesses downtown Phoenixville's restaurants, pubs, and theater.

Mont Clare is the site of Lock 60, a fully restored and operating lock at the upstream end of the Oakes Reach of the Schuylkill Canal. The lock, tow path, the restored lock tender's house, and surrounding area form a park maintained by the Schuylkill Canal Association (SCA). The park is at the center of the "Schuylkill Navigation Canal, Oakes Reach Section" Historic District. The park includes a floating dock in the canal and a launch area on the river. This complements a portage trail, between the downstream end of the canal reach and the river. The river, portage, canal, and park form a 5-mile (8.0 km) canoe and kayak loop. St. Michael's has a large recreation area on the left bank of the canal, below the lock tender's house. SCA's annual summer Canal Day festival usually spans both parks. St. Michael's park also hosts the annual Ancient Order of Hibernians local Irish Festival. There is another park, Port Providence Park, on the canal between Mont Clare and Port Providence. Until 2020, Mont Clare was the western end of the contiguous Schuylkill River Trail (SRT) out of Philadelphia. The SRT now crosses the Mont Clare Bridge to continue westward through Phoenixville. Montgomery County plans to improve and extend the parallel Schuylkill East Trail on the left bank of the river, westward from Mont Clare, creating a major trail junction at Mont Clare.

Joseph Whitaker's Mont Clare estate home still stands on the corner of Bridge and Grace Streets (Grace was Joseph's wife). The home is currently occupied by three generations of Whitaker descendants.

== Education ==
It is in the Spring-Ford Area School District.

== Notable people ==
By 1760, David Todd had settled near Mont Clare. His sons, John; Robert; and Levi, were notable pioneers and helped found Lexington, Kentucky. Many of David's descendants were still living in the township in 1884. The most well known Todd descendants were Mary Todd Lincoln, wife of U. S. President Abraham Lincoln, and their son, Robert Todd Lincoln, Secretary of War under President Chester A. Arthur.

In 1855, future Mennonite Church leader and publisher, John F. Funk, had his first job teaching in a one-room school house in Quincyville.

The eventual 23rd Governor of Pennsylvania, Samuel W. Pennypacker, spent his boyhood at the Mont Clare estate of his maternal grandfather, Joseph Whitaker. In 1862, Pennypacker had his first professional job teaching in a one-room school house in the village.

Mont Clare is the 1867 birthplace of the infamous outlaw Harry Alonzo "The Sundance Kid" Longabaugh. The movie, Butch Cassidy and the Sundance Kid, erroneously states Sundance was born in New Jersey (possibly due to confusion with Montclair, New Jersey). Sundance was born at 122 Jacobs Street. Sundance's mother's family, Place, was from Mont Clare, with one relative, Daniel Webster Place, marrying Mary E. Pennypacker in 1873. Harry A. Place was the alias the Sundance Kid used when he married the woman known to history as Etta Place. Sundance's parents, Josiah and Annie (Place) Longabaugh, and his sisters Samanna and Emma, are buried in the nearby Morris Cemetery in Phoenixville.

Between 1882 and 1899, poet and local historian Christian Carmack Sanderson grew up living in Mont Clare and adjacent Port Providence. The home at 205 Jacobs Street is referred to as "The Little Brick House" in his writings.

In 1916, the Mont Clare estate was occupied by Phoebe Hunter Gilkyson, a great-granddaughter of Joseph Whitaker. Mrs. Gilkyson was a noted literary and social figure, whose poems and stories were published in Harper's, Scribner's and McClure's Magazines. She also wrote a newspaper column. Her husband Hamilton H. Gilkyson Jr. was a local business and civic leader. Phoebe's son, Terry Gilkyson was a songwriter and musician. Terry co-authored the chart topping Memories Are Made of This and wrote the Oscar nominated "The Bare Necessities" from the 1967 movie The Jungle Book.
