= Ridgewood Farm =

- U.S. National Register of Historic Places
- U.S. Historic district
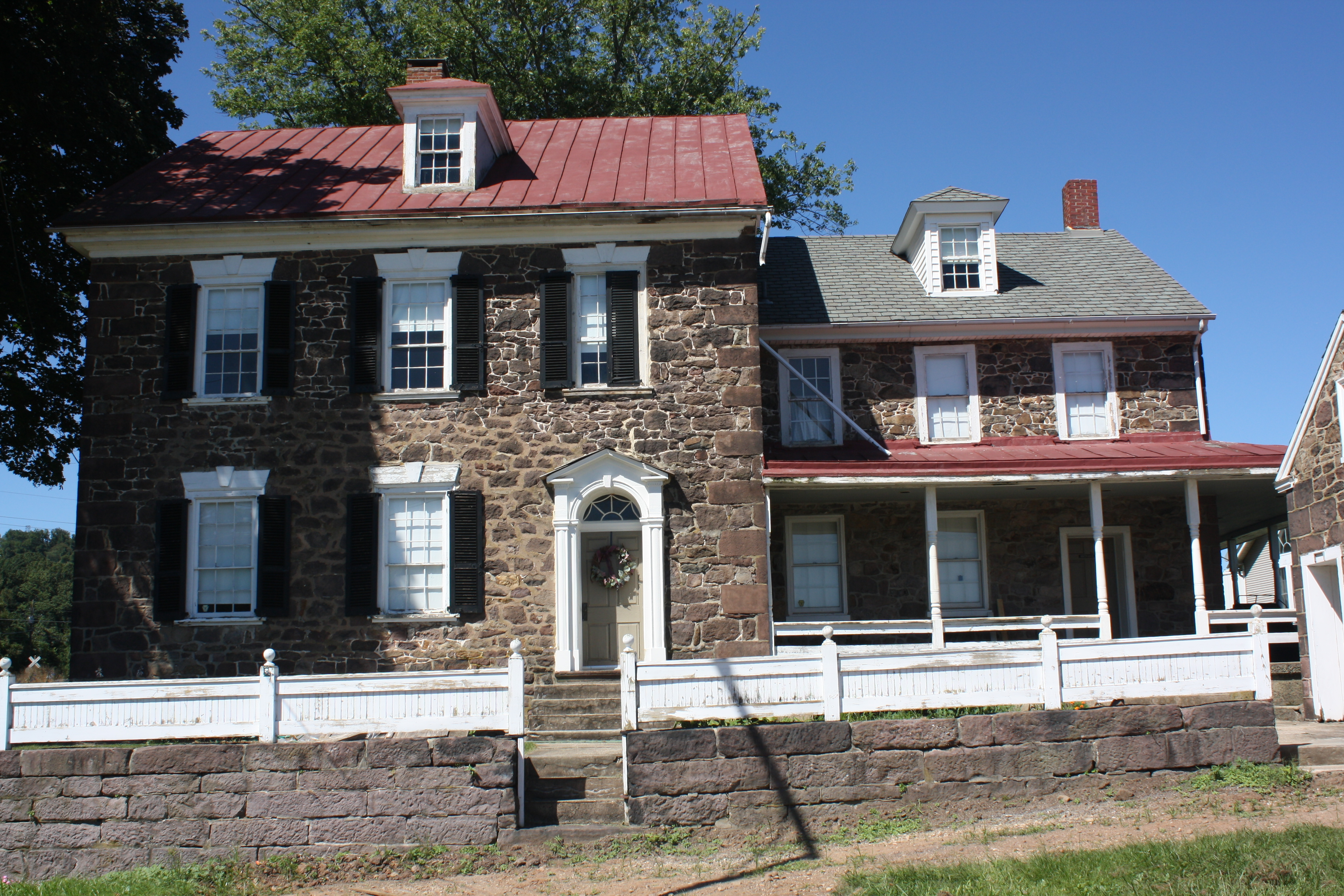
- Ridgewood Farmhouse, September 2013

- Location within Pennsylvania Location within the United States
- Location: Jct. of PA 724 and I-176, Cumru Township, Pennsylvania
- Coordinates: 40°17′43″N 75°53′50″W
- Area: 136 acres (55 ha)
- Built: 1809
- Architectural style: Federal, Pennsylvania bank barn
- MPS: Farms in Berks County MPS
- NRHP reference No.: 92000399
- Added to NRHP: May 7, 1992

Ridgewood Farm is an historic farm complex and national historic district that is located in Cumru Township, Berks County, Pennsylvania.

It was listed on the National Register of Historic Places in 1992.

== History and architectural features ==
This has eight contributing buildings and five contributing structures. They are a two-story, vernacular, Federal-style, sandstone farmhouse (c. 1810), a sandstone, Pennsylvania bank barn (1809), a sandstone summer kitchen/butcher house, a one-and-half-story, sandstone, produce storage building (1810), a ground cellar, a stone wall, and other outbuildings. Also located on the property are the remains of the Schuylkill Canal that operated from 1924 to 1932, and two railroad lines.

== Gallery ==
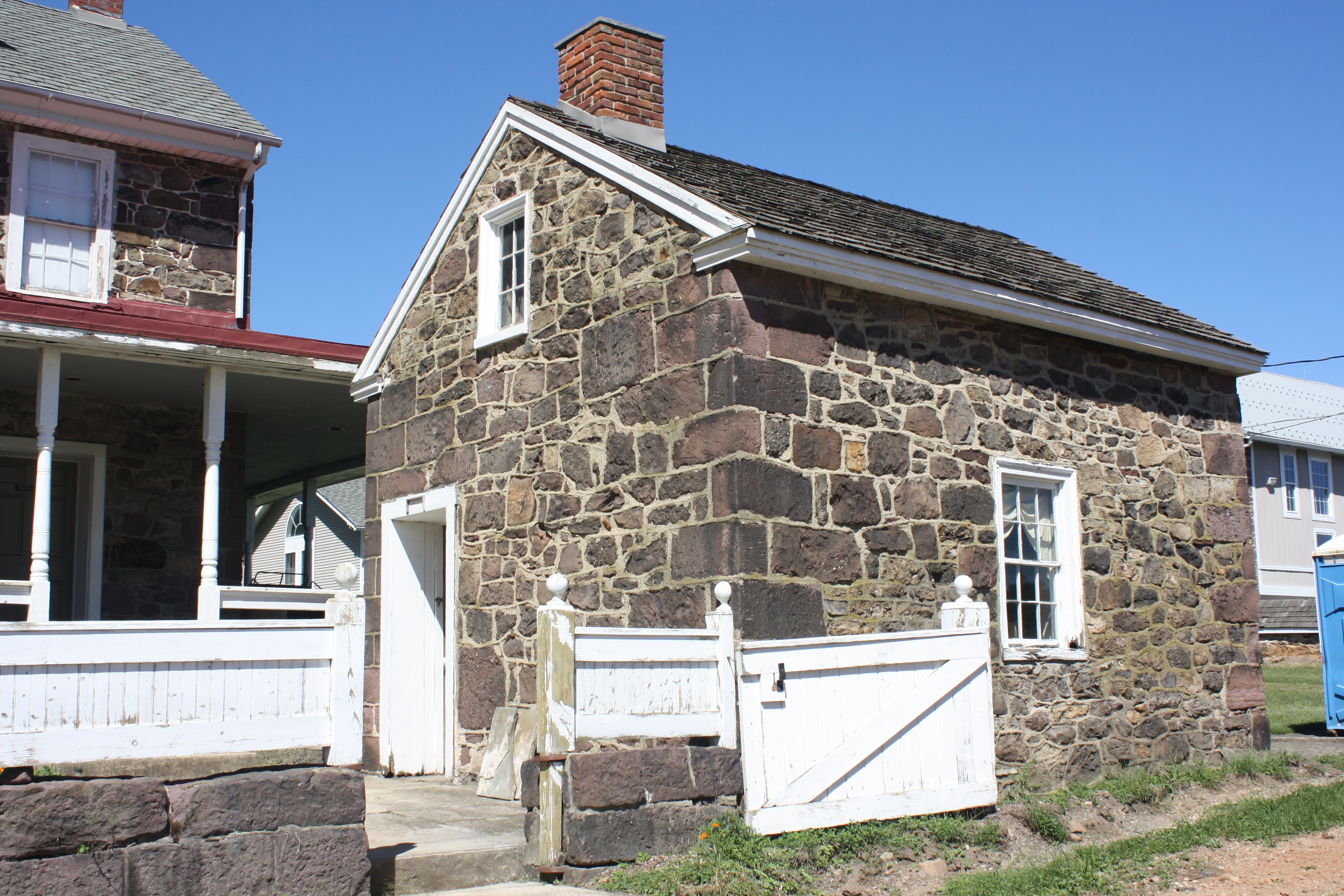
Summer Kitchen

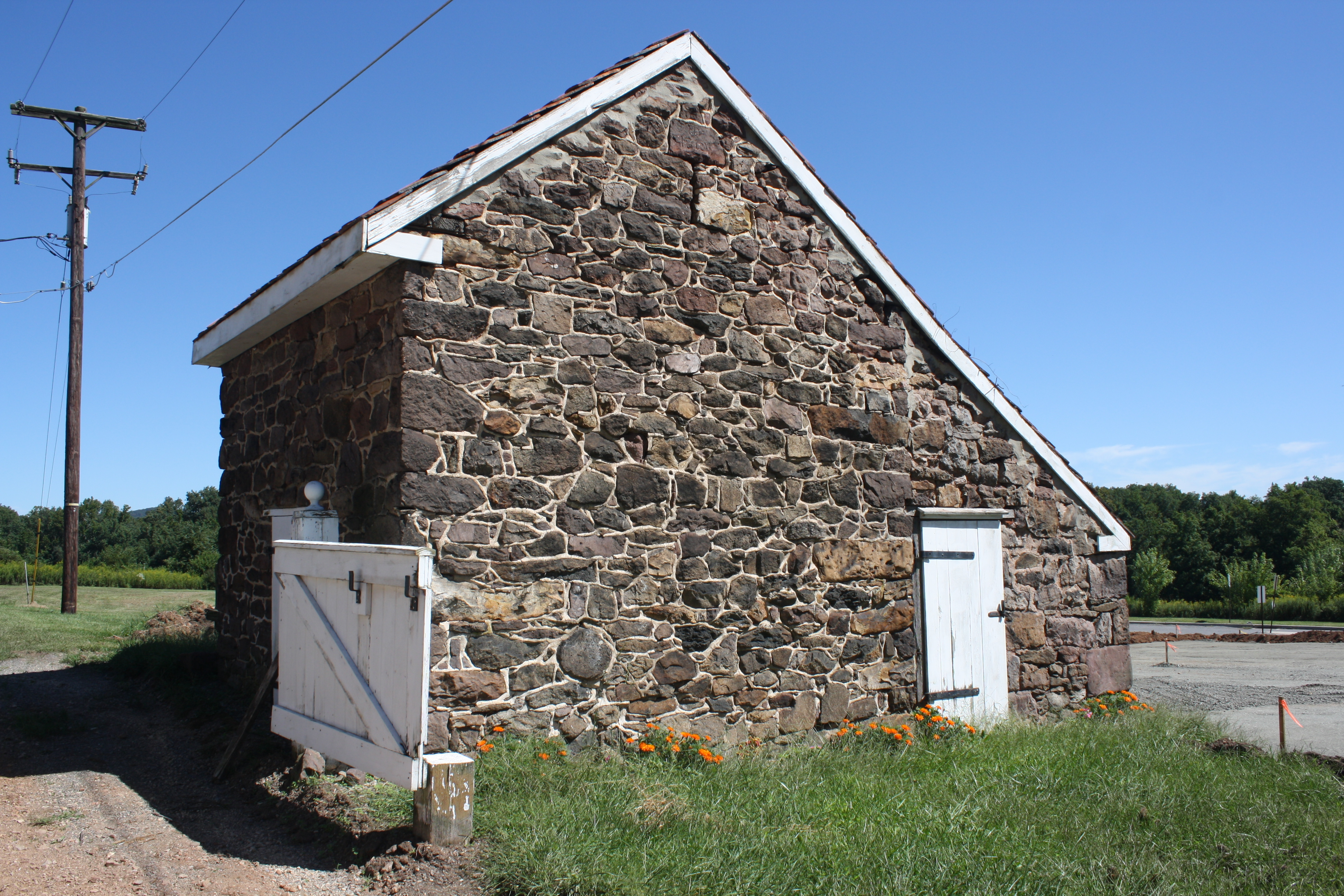
Vaulted building

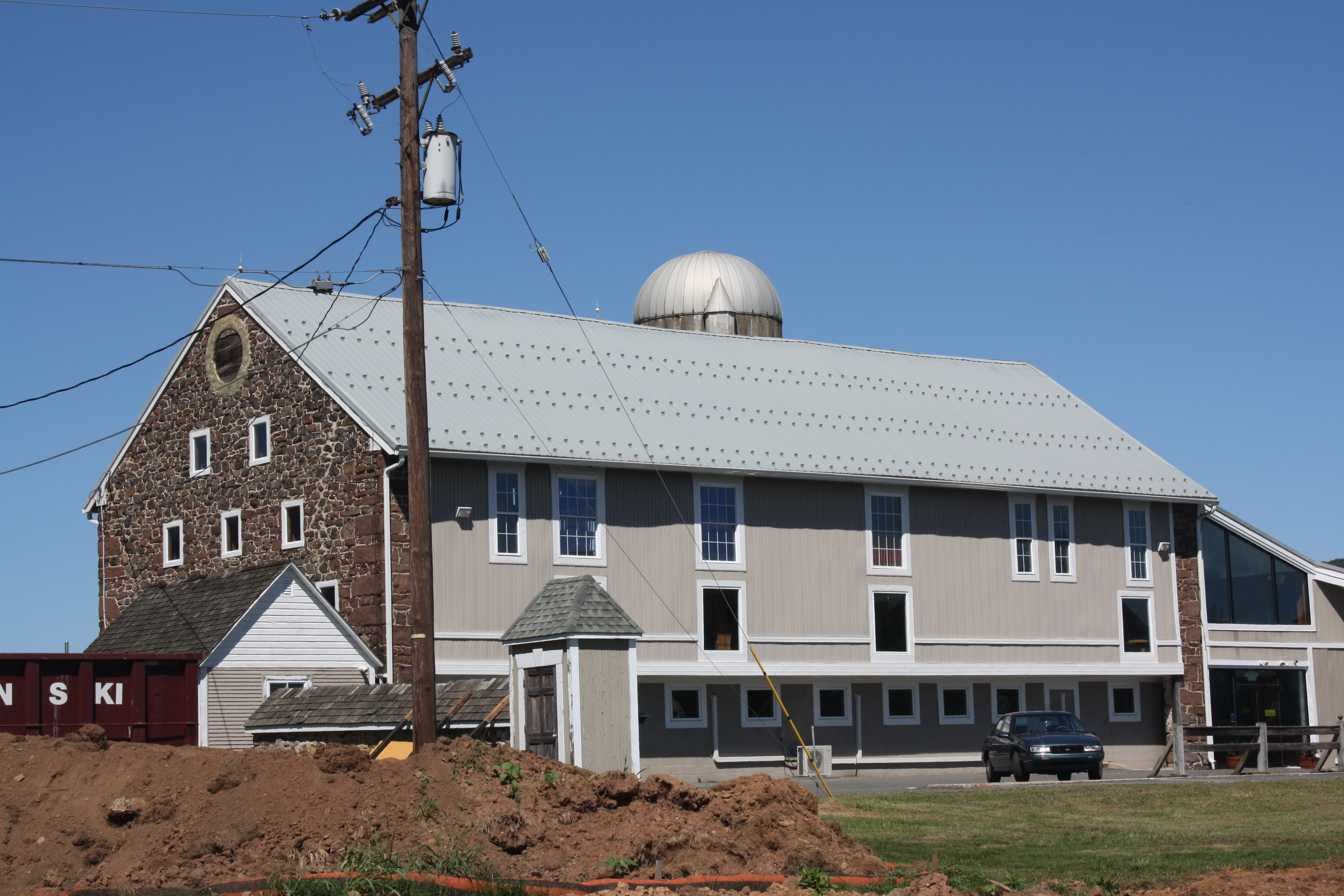
Barn and Milk house

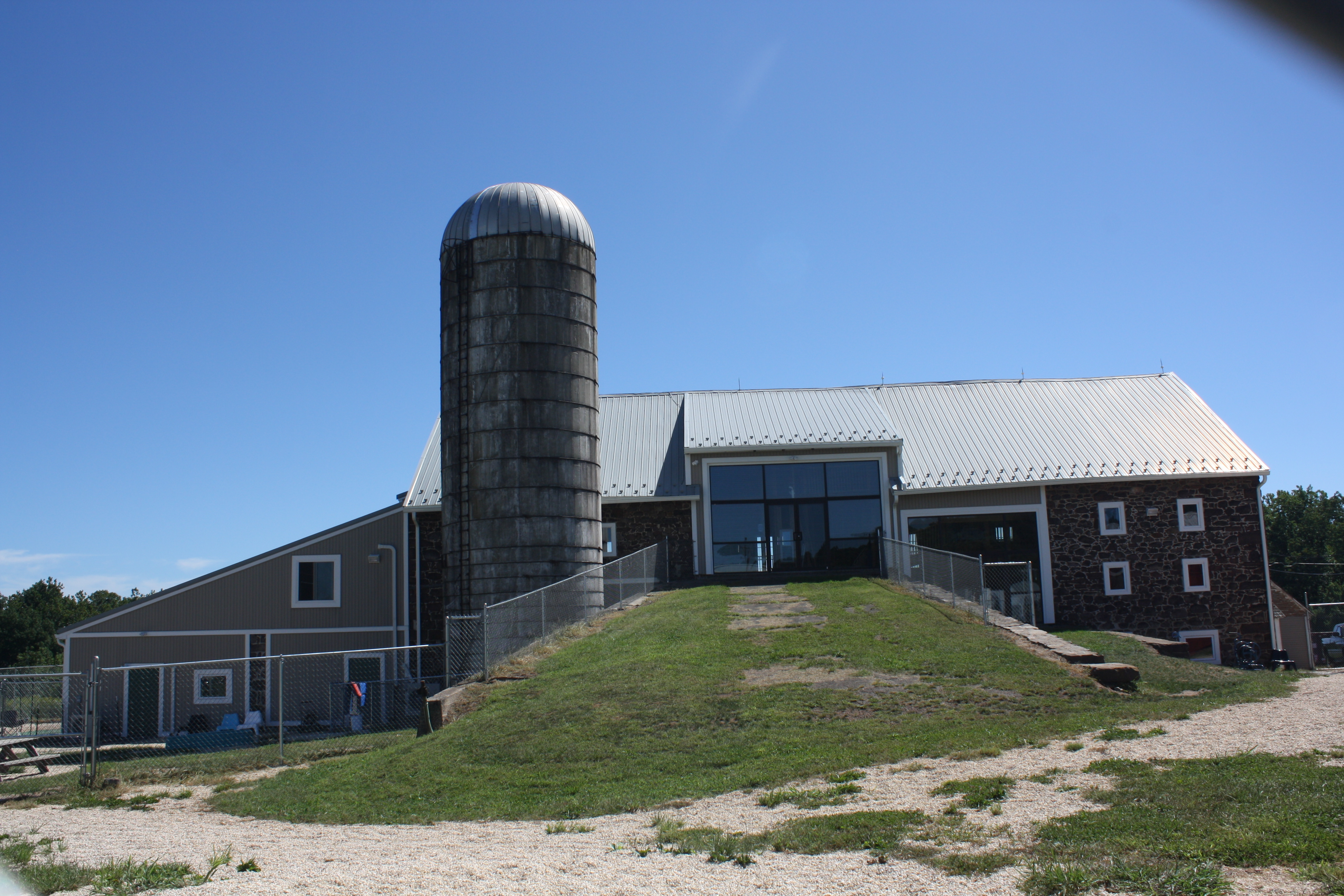
Barn upper ramp and Silo

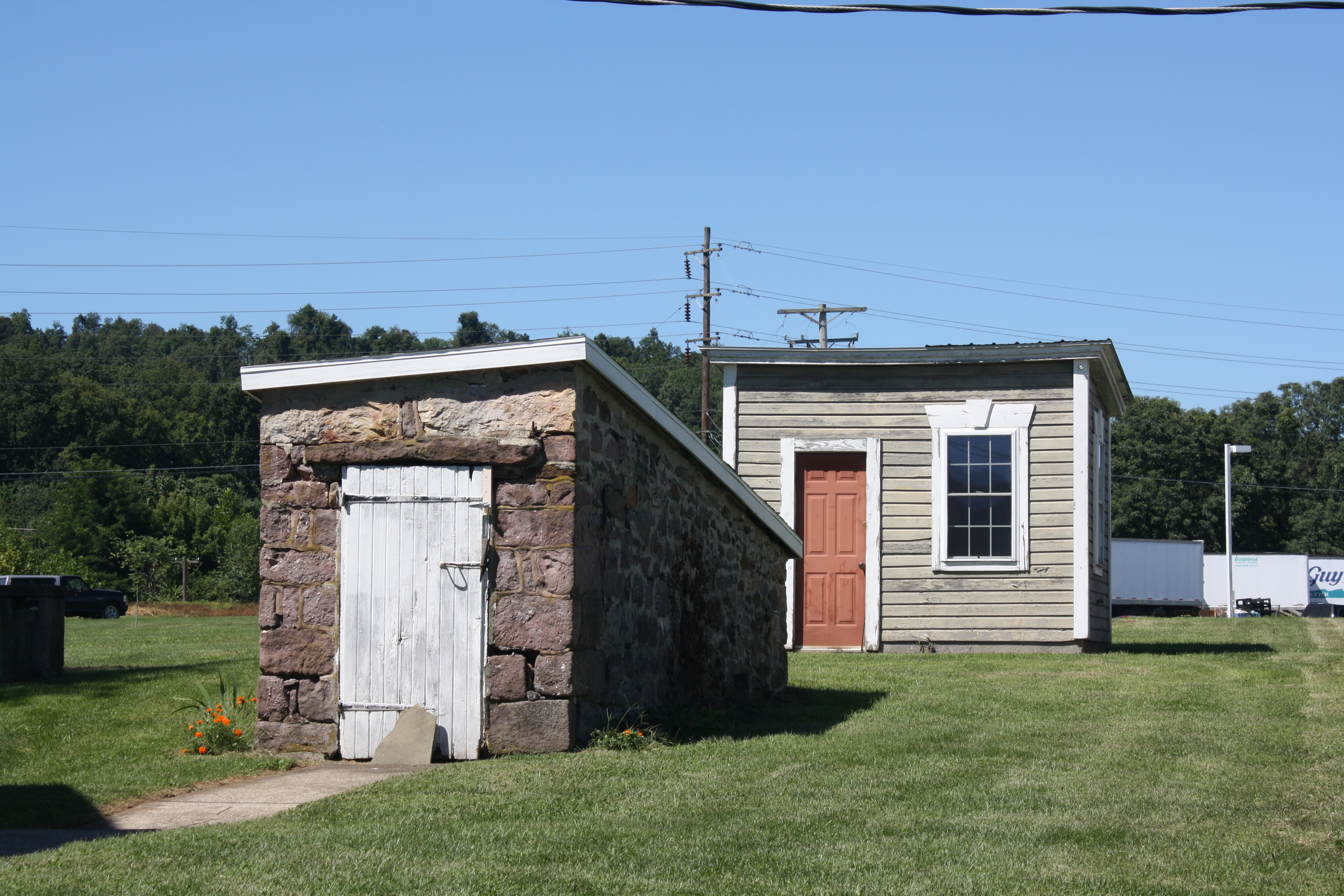
Ground Cellar and shed
