= Black Rock Dam =

Black Rock Dam may refer to:

- Black Rock Dam (Schuylkill River), a National Register of Historic Places structure in Pennsylvania.
- Black Rock Dam (Zuni River), a dam just east of Zuni Pueblo, New Mexico.
- Black Rock Dam (Columbia River), a proposed dam, east of Yakima, Washington.
- Black Rock Dam Tank, a lake in Graham County, Arizona.
