= Schuylkill Canal Association =

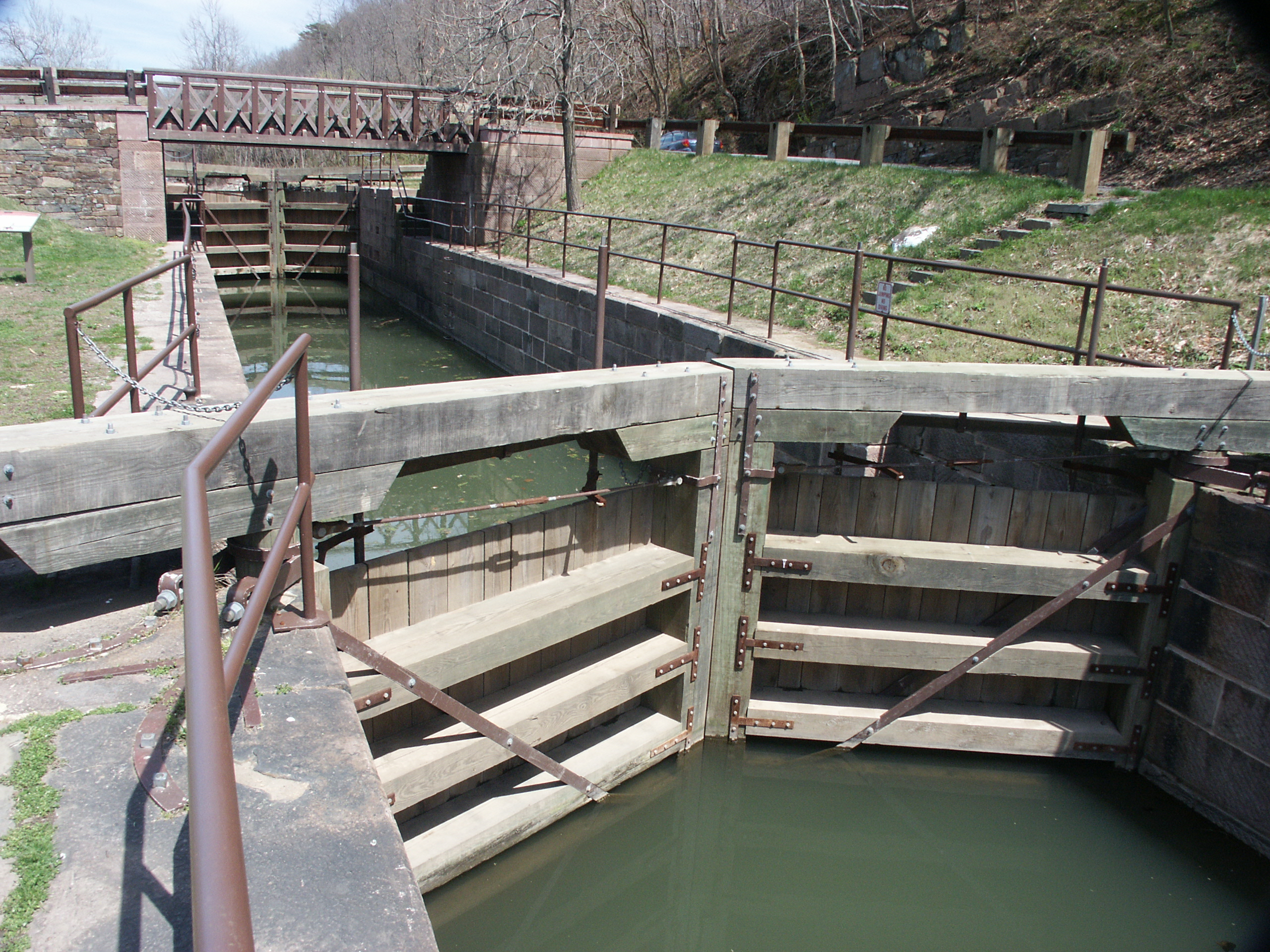
Lock 60 gates and bridge after their 2004-5 restoration.

The Schuylkill Canal Association (SCA) is a non-governmental organization that maintains the Oakes Reach and Lock #60 of the Schuylkill Canal as a public recreation area and historical site. Organized in 1982 as the Schuylkill Canal Advisory Board, the Association, in cooperation with Upper Providence Township, Montgomery County, and the Commonwealth of Pennsylvania, maintains the canal reach, associated structures, parks and trails. The area extends along the canal and left bank of the Schuylkill River, from Mont Clare past Port Providence. The area makes up a large part of the Schuylkill Navigation Canal, Oakes Reach Section Historic District (#88000462).

As its first priority project, SCA repaired the Lock 60 lock tender's house at Lock 60 that had been abandoned in the 1950s. The lock tender's house was eventually restored to habitable condition. The restoration of Lock 60 itself to operating condition was another major SCA project that was completed in 2005. The house and lock are both contributing structures to the historic district.

SCA maintains the area near Lock 60 as a public park and periodically opens the lock tender's house and operates the lock for small recreational craft. The Canal Park has a river launch area and a floating dock in the canal. An association maintained portage trail at the other end of the canal reach, which with the park, creates a 5-mile (8.0 km) canoe and kayak loop. SCA also maintains the towpath trail and other adjacent trails. Plans to route the Schuylkill River Trail along the canal towpath will likely shift towpath maintenance from SCA to the county.

== Canal Day ==
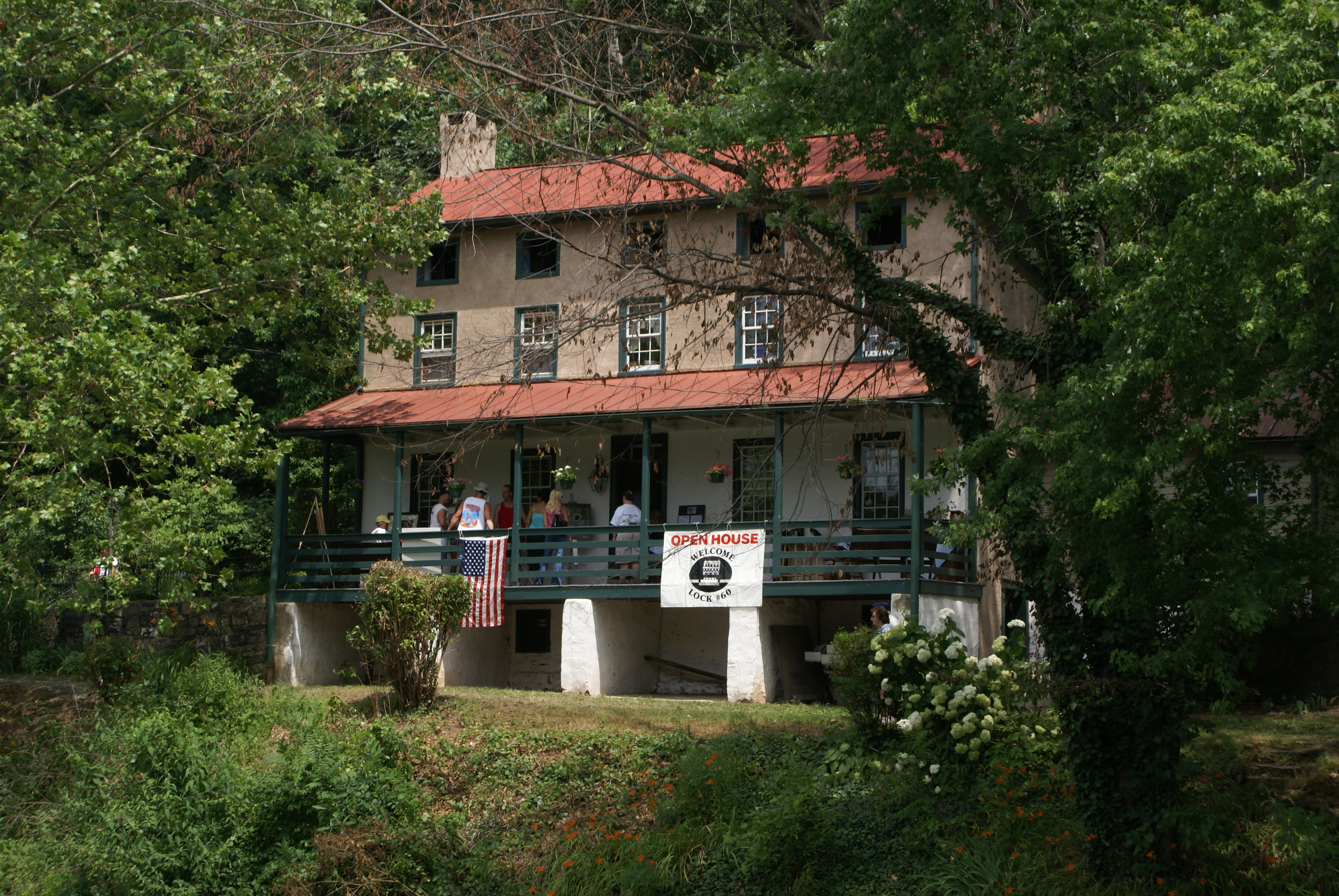
Restored Lock Tender's House open for Canal Day 2008

The SCA organizes the annual Canal Day each summer on the last Sunday in June. This summer fair features events centered around the canal, including: a canoe and kayak race, a run, opening of the lock, and the popular pugil stick joust on a telephone pole over the canal. The events take place at the Lock 60 Canal Park and adjacent St. Michael's recreation field in Mont Clare.

== Internet presence ==
The Association is one of the earliest organizations on the Internet, where its presence as canal.org dates back to at least 1989.
