= Fitzwater Station =

Fitzwater Station was a stop on the anti-slavery Underground Railroad. Located in Port Providence, Pennsylvania, United States, it is now a restaurant and bar. "The Fitz" overlooks the Schuylkill Canal.

== History ==
The owner and operator of Fitzwater Farm in Upper Providence Township during the mid-1800s, Abel Fitzwater was a descendant of Thomas Fitzwater, who emigrated from England in 1682, sailing aboard the Welcome with William Penn. Residing with his uncle from the time of his mother's death until 1825 when he (Abel Fitzwater) married Isabella Umstead, the younger Fitzwater subsequently purchased the tract of land that would later be known as "Fitzwater Farm."

In 1839, Abel Fitzwater became a local hero when he rescued area residents during a major flood which devastated Lumberville (now Port Providence) in January of that year. After residents rebuilt their lives, their community thrived, largely due to the connection of key spots along the Schuylkill River with the Schuylkill Canal, which facilitated regular transports of coal.

The farm passed to Fitzwater's son, Joseph, shortly thereafter when Abel Fitzwater fell ill and died in 1840 due to the exposure he suffered during his frigid water rescues. The proprietor of a hardware store in Phoenixville and president of the Phoenix Bridge Co., Joseph Fitzwater also served on the board of directors of the National Bank of Phoenixville.

=== Involvement in the Underground Railroad ===
According to William Kostlevy, an archivist for the Church of the Brethren and director of Philadelphia's Brethren Historical Library and Archives, Abel Fitzwater and his wife, Isabel (Umstad) Fitzwater (1805-1879) were active members of the Church of the Brethren, which was known for its anti-slavery stance during the early to mid-1800s. Founders of that church's Green Tree congregation and active in the Temperance Movement, they volunteered the use of their farm to others who were helping men, women and children to escape slavery. Conveniently located near major transit hubs, including the Schuylkill Canal and Schuylkill River, the Fitzwater's farm soon became known as "Fitzwater Station," one of the spots along the Underground Railroad where the formerly enslaved could hide, rest and receive food until moving on to the next safe haven on their long journeys north.

== Location ==
The Fitzwater Station is located at 40°07′41″N 75°29′36″W.
