= Black Rock Dam (Schuylkill River) =

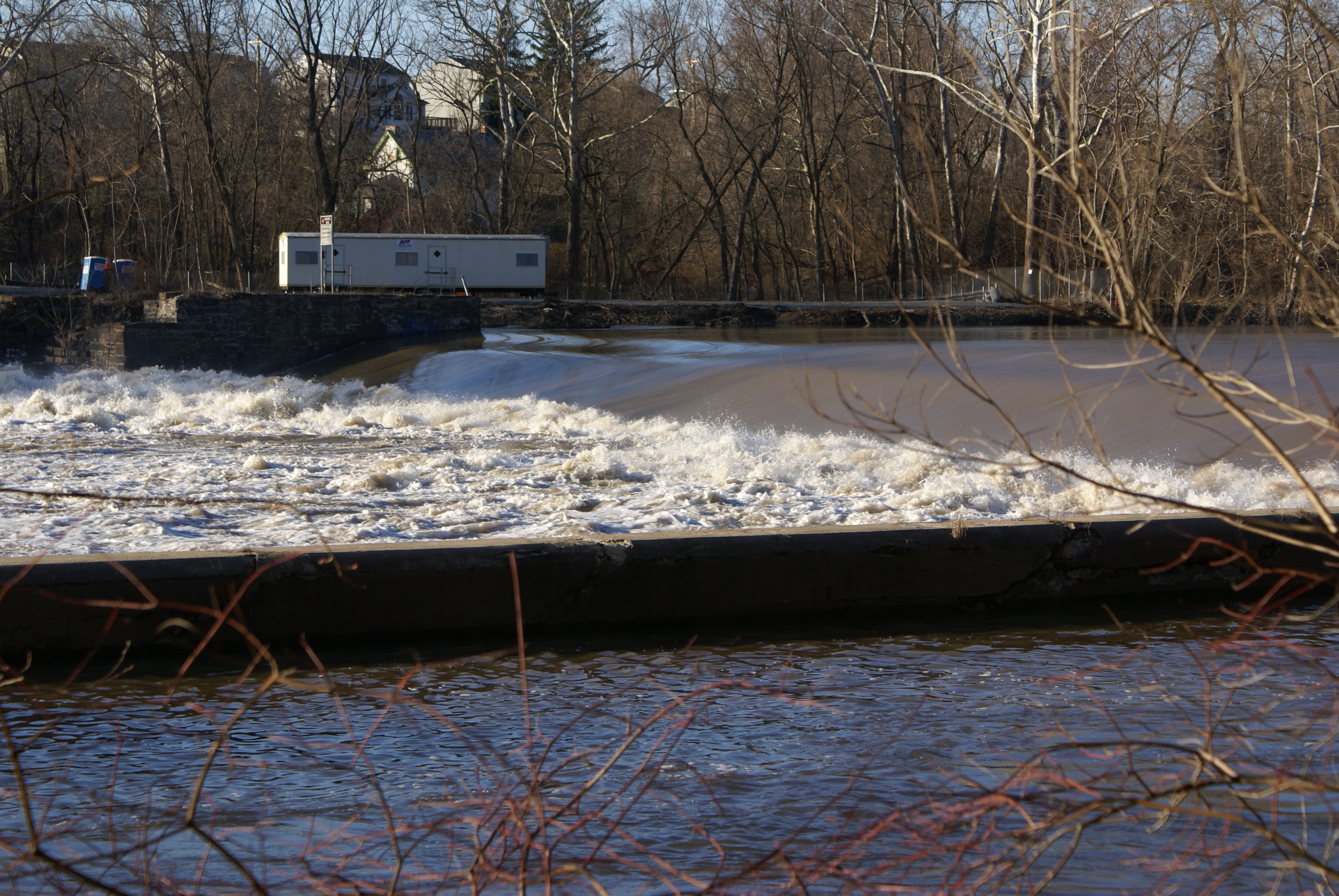
- Black Rock Dam with flood waters. Canal forebay in foreground.

- Location within Pennsylvania
- Country: United States
- Location: Chester / Montgomery counties, Pennsylvania
- Coordinates: 40°08′52″N 75°30′22″W
- Opening date: c. 1825
- Owner: Exelon

Dam and spillways
- Impounds: Schuylkill River
- Length: 480 feet (150 m) main 900 feet (270 m) fore bay

Reservoir
- Creates: Black Rock Pool

Power Station
- Hydraulic head: low
- Black Rock Dam
- U.S. Historic district – Contributing property
- Part of: Schuylkill Navigation Canal, Oakes Reach Section Historic District (ID88000462)

The Black Rock Dam is a low head dam in the Schuylkill River. Originally constructed as a stone filled, timber crib dam in the early 19th century by the Schuylkill Navigation Company, the dam was one of dozens built to create a slack water pools for the Schuylkill Navigation System. The dam is a contributing property of the "Schuylkill Navigation Canal, Oakes Reach Section" registered historic district. The dam is located between Phoenixville and Mont Clare in southeastern Pennsylvania, USA.

The original dam structure is L-shaped. There is the usual perpendicular crossing creating the low head spillway. However the majority of the structure is a long forebay for the canal, parallel to the left bank. The forebay has two spillways and ends with the structure of Lock 60. Lock 60 is the guard lock of the Oakes Canal portion of the Navigation. In 1828 a lock was added to the right side of the dam as part of the Chester County Canal addition to the Navigation, which provided water power and later transport to Phoenixville. In 1869 this canal was ruined by a flood.

In 1902 three hydroelectric generators were added to the forebay by the Reading Traction Company to power a local trolley. The generators have been removed, but the dam is still owned by power company, Exelon.

In the later 20th century, the perpendicular section was extended across the end of the forebay, creating a straight bank to bank dam and capping the forebay.

In 2008, as part of a project to restore the migratory American shad to the Schuylkill, a fish ladder was added to the dam on the Chester County side. During construction, remnants of the Chester County Canal feeder lock were uncovered and documented by an archeologist.

== See also ==
List of crossings of the Schuylkill River
