= Thomas Fitzwater =

US preacher and civic leader (died 1699)

Thomas Fitzwater (died 1699) was a Quaker preacher, a civic leader, and was among the first English settlers of colonial Pennsylvania. He arrived in America along with William Penn, the founder of the colony.

== Biography ==
Fitzwater is recorded as being from Hanworth or Kingston-on-Thames, England. In England he was considered a husbandman (small scale farmer) and was active in local Quaker leadership since at least 1669, evidenced by his recorded participation in various monthly and quarterly meetings. In 1672, he married Mary Cheney. He and his family departed England from the port at Deal, Kent aboard the Welcome in August 1682, with the intent to participate in Penn's Holy Experiment. He brought along an indentured servant John Ottey. The ship suffered a serious smallpox outbreak during its voyage, which killed almost 1/3 of the passengers. In Fitzwater's family, his wife Mary and children Josiah and Mary died; two sons, Thomas and George, survived the journey.

William Penn granted Fitzwater 300 acres, and Fitzwater later purchased additional land.

In 1683 Fitzwater was a charter member of the Pennsylvania Assembly, representing Bucks County; during this term he participated in the committee that drafted the colony's Frame of Government, a proto-constitution. He later represented Philadelphia County for two terms, and served one year as Philadelphia County coroner. He was a member of the first ever Pennsylvania grand jury, which was convened to adjudicate a case of counterfeiting Spanish silver coins.

Fitzwater was involved in church leadership and in 1685, 1687, and 1688 served as a representative to the Philadelphia Yearly Meeting. He was heavily involved in a conflict with the leader of a breakaway Quaker group, George Keith, and denounced Keith at the Yearly Meeting in 1692.

Fitzwater discovered limestone on his property. He petitioned the Provincial Council in 1693 to build a road to get the lime from his kilns to Philadelphia, where it could be used in building mortar. This road which became known as Limekiln Pike was the first road built in Upper Dublin.

At the time of his death in 1699, he owned at least one slave.

== Namesakes ==
Several things in the region of Fitzwater's homestead bear his name, most notably Thomas Fitzwater Elementary School, Fitzwatertown Road, and Fitzwatertown.

== See also ==
- Fitzwater Station - a stop on the underground railroad
