= Israel Jacobs =

American politician

Member of the U.S. House of Representatives from Pennsylvania's 3rd district
- In office March 4, 1791 – March 3, 1793
- Preceded by: See below
- Succeeded by: See below

Personal details
- Born: June 9, 1726 Providence Township, Province of Pennsylvania, British America
- Died: ca. December 10, 1796 (aged 70) Providence Township, Pennsylvania, U.S.
- Occupation: Congressman

Israel Jacobs (June 9, 1726 – c. December 10, 1796) was a colonial Pennsylvania Legislator and United States Representative from Pennsylvania's 3rd congressional district.

== Biography ==
Jaobs was born near the Perkiomen Creek in Providence Township in the Province of Pennsylvania. and attended the public schools. Later, he was engaged in agricultural and mercantile pursuits, and was a member of the colonial Pennsylvania Assembly 1770–1774.

In 1765, Jacobs became involved in land speculation in Nova Scotia when he joined a land company headed by William Smith, Provost of the College of Philadelphia. The company, which was granted The Township of Monckton that year, also included his brothers Joseph (b.1728) and Benjamin (b.1731). Their sister, Hannah Jacobs, married the noted American astronomer David Rittenhouse.

In 1790, Jacobs was elected to the Second Congress and served from March 4, 1791 to March 3, 1793. He resumed agricultural pursuits, and died in Providence Township. His interment was probably in the graveyard of the Friends Meeting House in Providence.

Preceded by At large on a General ticket: Frederick A. C. Muhlenberg, George Clymer, Thomas Fitzsimons, Thomas Hartley, Thomas Scott, Henry Wynkoop, Daniel Hiester and Peter G. Muhlenberg	Member of the U.S. House of Representatives from Pennsylvania's 3rd congressional district 1791–1793	Succeeded by At large on a General ticket: Thomas Fitzsimons, Frederick A. C. Muhlenberg, John W. Kittera, Thomas Hartley, Thomas Scott, James Armstrong, Peter G. Muhlenberg, Andrew Gregg, Daniel Hiester, William Irvine, William Findley, John Smilie, and William Montgomery
