= Thomas Oakes (engineer) =

Pennsylvania canal engineer

Thomas Oakes (died 1823) was the chief engineer of the Schuylkill Navigation Company. He was responsible for the design and early construction of the Navigation's Schuylkill River canals in the early 19th century. Oakes was also instrumental in the design of the Fairmount Water Works in Philadelphia, and its original three waterwheels in particular.

The Oakes Canal of the Schuylkill Navigation and the nearby village of Oaks, Pennsylvania are both named for him.

In 1821, after, completion of the Oakes Reach, Oakes died from typhoid fever that was plaguing the canal workers.
