= Manor of Gilberts =

Coordinates: 40.118°N 75.456°W

The Manor of Gilberts was one of the areas of land that William Penn set aside for himself as the Proprietor of the Province of Pennsylvania. The Manor was located on the along the left (northeastern) bank of the Schuylkill River, extending above and below the Perkiomen Creek. The Manor was created on 8 October 1683 when Penn wrote a warrant assigning the Manor to himself. The tract was named after his paternal grandmother Joanne (Gilbert) Penn's family.

The initial Manor was 60,000 acres (24,000 ha), ranging from below Pottstown (i.e. Limerick Township) down through what is now Norristown. By the 1687 map, the Manor had shrunk to 10,000 acres (4,000 ha) of land. Then the Manor just included all of present-day Upper and Lower Providence Townships, the Burroughs of Trappe and Collegeville, and portions of Perkiomen; Skippack; and Worcester Townships.

In 1699, the area of the Manor that is now Lower Providence Township, east of the Perkiomen, was deeded to the Pennsylvania Land Company of London who leased it for income. By 1760, the Pennsylvania Land Company was dissolved by Parliament and its lands sold at auction, although most were bought by the former lease holders. The area west of the Perkiomen was leased directly by Penn and his heirs.

The Manor name was abandoned in 1729 with the organization of Providence Township. All Manor lands were in that portion of Philadelphia County that was subsequently split off to form present day Montgomery County, Commonwealth of Pennsylvania, USA.
