= Reading Traction Company =

The Reading Traction Company was an interurban railroad in and around Reading, Pennsylvania, USA. In 1892 the company was involved in a suspect stock deal that ended up before the Pennsylvania Supreme Court in 1901, Strunk v. Owen, et al..
