= Port Providence, Pennsylvania =

Unincorporated village in Pennsylvania, U.S.

Port Providence is an unincorporated village along the Schuylkill River in Upper Providence Township, Montgomery County, Pennsylvania. Originally known as Jacobs, then Lumberville, the village is located on one of the two remaining watered stretches of the Schuylkill Canal. The village was notable as having one of the few inns on the canal between Norristown and Pottstown. Fitzwater Station, a historic tavern, is located in Port Providence, on the canal.

== Geography ==
Port Providence is located at 40°07′42″N 75°29′33″W.

== Notable person ==
- Christian C. Sanderson, historian
