= Providence Township, Montgomery County, Pennsylvania =

Coordinates: 40.12481°N 75.46920°W

Providence Township was a township in southeastern Pennsylvania, United States from 1729 until it was divided in 1805. Initially the township was part of Philadelphia County. Then in 1784, Providence Township was in that portion of Philadelphia County that was split off to form Montgomery County.

== History ==
Originally the land was a major part of William Penn's Manor of Gilberts. In 1699, Penn sold off 5,000 acres (20 km^{2}) east of the Perkiomen Creek and leased the land to the west. On March 2, 1729, the courts created Providence Township, although it was often referred to as New Providence.

On November 12, 1805, Providence Township was divided along the Perkiomen Creek into the townships of Upper Providence and Lower Providence .
