= Schuylkill Canal =

Former canal in Pennsylvania, United States

Schuylkill Navigation
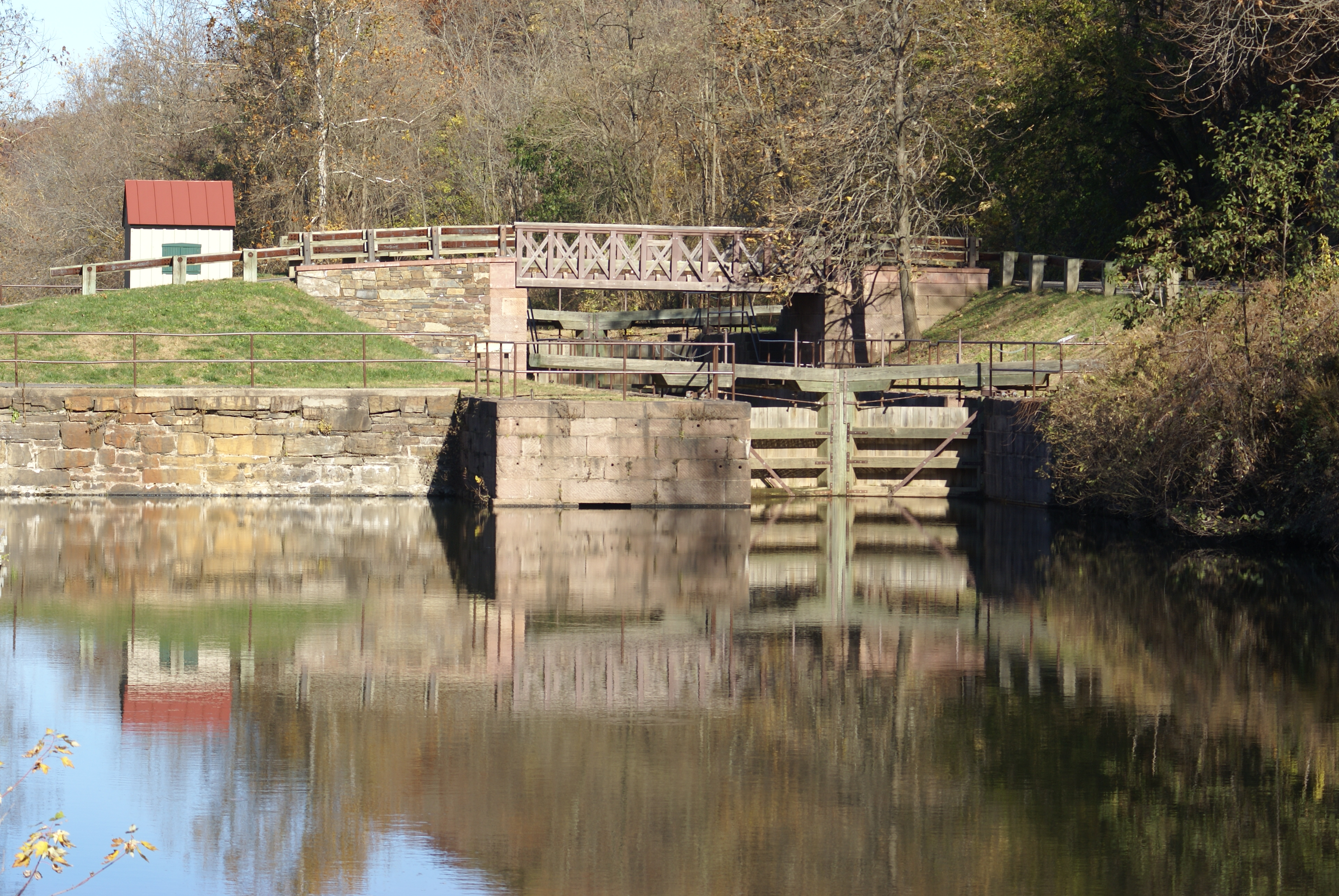
- Lock 60 at Oakes Reach in Mont Clare, Pennsylvania
- Interactive map of Schuylkill Navigation

Specifications
- Length: 90 miles (140 km) (originally 108 mi or 174 km)
- Maximum boat length: 110 ft 0 in (33.53 m)
- Maximum boat beam: 18 ft 0 in (5.49 m) (originally 13 ft 0 in or 3.96 m) (Size of Lock 60)
- Locks: 44 (originally 72)
- Maximum height AMSL: 618.75 ft (188.60 m) (above mid tide of Delaware River)
- Status: Mostly infilled
- Schuylkill Navigation Canal, Oakes Reach Section
- U.S. National Register of Historic Places
- U.S. Historic district
- Pennsylvania state historical marker
- Location within Pennsylvania Location within the United States
- Nearest city: Phoenixville, Pennsylvania, U.S.
- Coordinates: 40°07′57″N 75°30′09.5″W
- Area: 155.3 acres (62.8 ha)
- Built: 1821
- Architect: Thomas Oakes
- NRHP reference No.: 88000462

Significant dates
- Added to NRHP: May 6, 1988
- Designated PHMC: September 4, 1994

History
- Principal engineer: Thomas Oakes
- Construction began: 1815
- Date completed: 1827
- Date closed: 1947

Geography
- Start point: 40°34′42″N 76°01′35″W (originally 40°41′37″N 76°09′52″W) (18 miles (29 km) above Port Clinton abandoned by December 1887)
- End point: 39°58′02″N 75°11′16″W

The Schuylkill Canal, or Schuylkill Navigation, was a system of interconnected canals, and slack-water pools created by dams, along the Schuylkill River in the U.S. state of Pennsylvania, built as a commercial waterway in the early 19th-century. Chartered in 1815, the navigation opened in 1825, to provide transportation and water power.

At the time, the Schuylkill River was the least expensive and most efficient method of transporting bulk cargo, and cities on the U.S. East Coast were experiencing an energy crisis. It fostered the mining of anthracite coal as the major source of industry between Pottsville and eastern markets. Along the tow-paths, mules pulled barges of coal from Port Carbon through the water gaps to Pottsville; locally to the port and markets of Philadelphia; and some then by ship or through additional New Jersey waterways, to New York City markets.

The Schuylkill Canal was in operation until 1931 and was almost completely filled in the 1950s. Some remaining watered reaches are now used for recreation.

== History ==
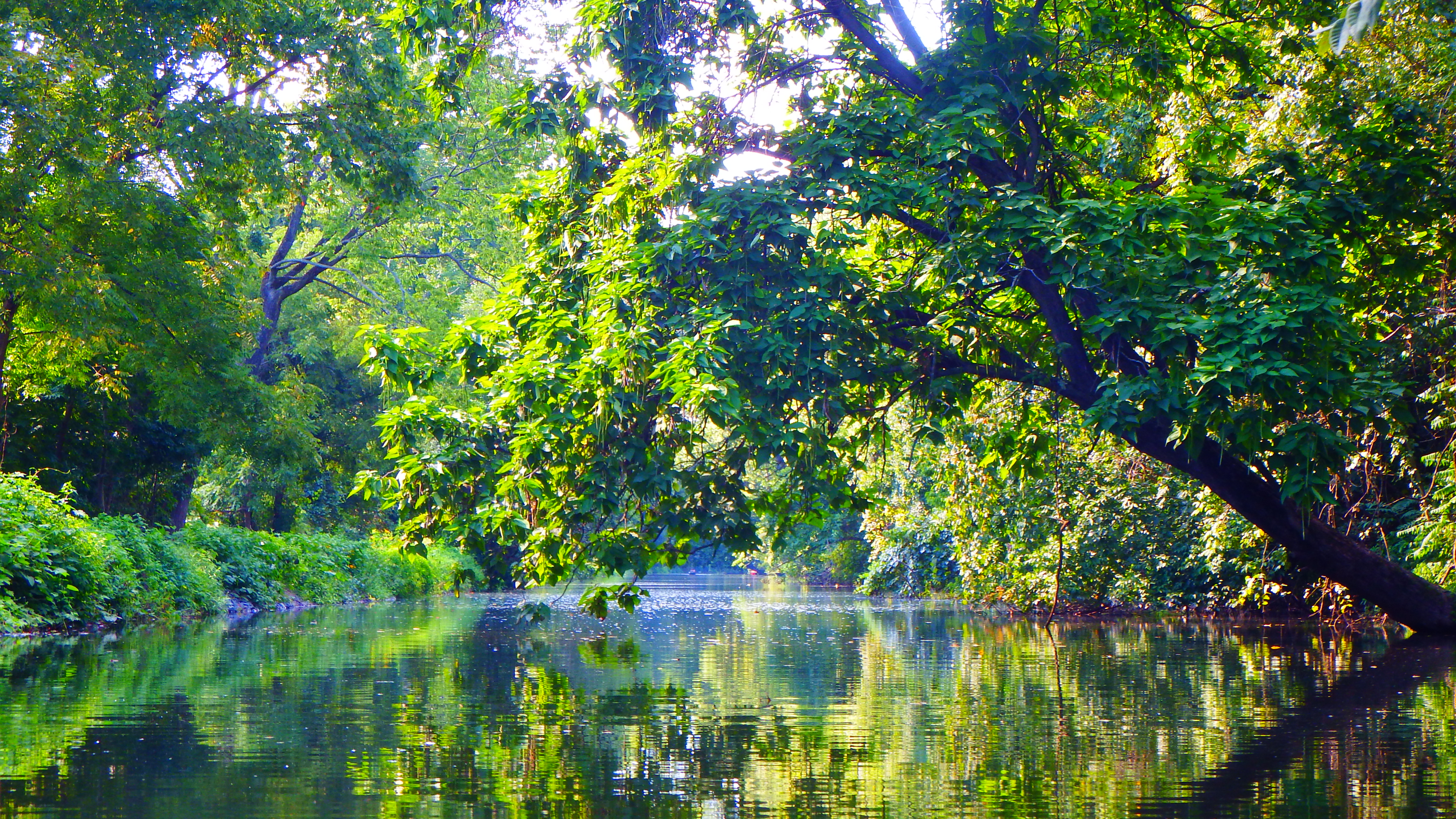
Taken between Port Providence and Lock 60

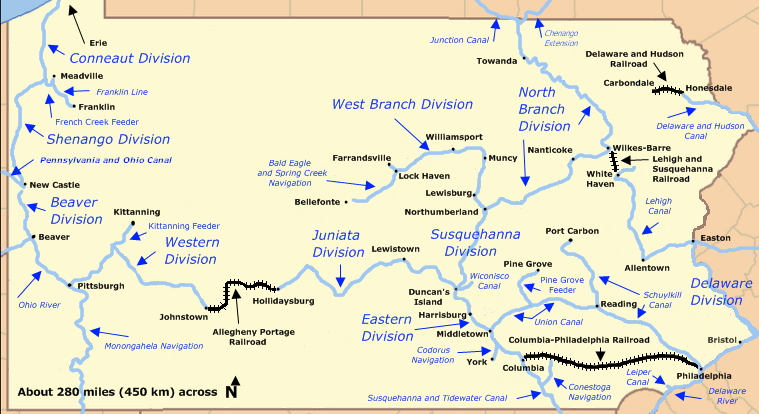
The far flung system of canals of Pennsylvania shown after the additional extensions adopted in 1837 were all completed; passage of the original Main Line of Public Works legislative package was in 1826 following the success of the Schuylkill Canal.

The Schuylkill Navigation Company was incorporated in 1815. An application for a charter to improve the Lehigh also was filed that year. These represented the growing impetus in the United States to develop a water transportation network similar to that emerging in Great Britain.

The lower Lehigh Canal project made its first test shipments of coal in 1819, proving the Lehigh's locks concept. Its delivery in 1820 of over 365 tons of Anthracite to Philadelphia resulted in a temporary market glut. These and regularly increasing tonnages shipped down to Philadelphia's docks over the next 2–3 years attracted investors and speculators from all along the Eastern Seaboard to capitalize and fund similar companies. This began a deluge of private canal and canal resumption projects in the 1820s. The Delaware and Hudson Canal companies, the Delaware and Raritan Canal, the Morris Canal, the Chesapeake & Delaware Canal and various others followed, triggering the North American Canal Age and helping fuel the Industrial Revolution in America.

=== Founding ===
... while there was a total lack of highways or navigable streams leading to the region. Small quantities of coal were mined, but people were slow to appreciate its value, and it required vigorous exertions to induce them to attempt to use it. Its very appearance was against it, and the majority of persons approached were entirely incredulous as to its being anything else than a stone, incapable of being burned by any inherent qualities it possessed. Not only the coal but the fact that it was coal had to be discovered. Even as late as the year 1812, when it was sought to secure an act authorizing the improvement of the Schuylkill river in order to convey coal to Philadelphia, the representative of Schuylkill County in the state senate declared there was no coal in his district; that there was a kind of black stone that was called coal, but that it would not burn!

— Fred Brenckman, History of Carbon County

As related in The Delaware and Lehigh Canals history, two of the principle investors in the Schuylkill Navigation Company were partner industrialists and mill owners White and Hazard, who were anxious to secure a reliable source of fuel for their mills. Early on in the board meetings of the new corporation they'd quarreled with others over the funding, timings, and tasks necessary and when they could not prevail to speed the project, immediately explored the option of making a navigation on the Lehigh River and acquiring the mining rights (Note: When they'd word the LCMC was suspending operations) of the failing Lehigh Coal Mine Company and other investors to fund the projects. (Note: Ironically, White and Hazard had trouble finding investors who believed both in the Navigation project and in the Mine Project, so were forced to take on George Hauto as a principal partner (company officer) and it took through the summer of 1817 to sign sufficient investors to a letter of intent to establish a corporation to file with their petition to the Pennsylvania legislature. This late filing put the project before the legislature for approval in March 1818, and the passage of the bill chartering the rights to modify the water coarse enabled the Lehigh transportation corporation to be formally incorporated almost immediately, so the principals immediately dispatched the two projects workmen, both river navvy's and mine improvement teams had been told off and hired over the winter. Within a week, they'd teams of workers heading up the Lehigh to begin necessary works. Two months later, they'd legally formed the Lehigh Coal Company after exercising the option to lease the rights of the Lehigh Coal Mine Company's (LCMC) properties: the entire Pisgah Ridge from Jim Thorpe, Pennsylvania on the Lehigh River, beyond the nine miles to Summit Hill, almost to Tamaqua at the outlet end of the Panther Creek Valley. LC&N Co. owned coal from that end of the valley would later often be shipped out via the Schuylkill Canal, and the railroads which came to run through the crowded valleys draining the Little Schuylkill River. As a beginning, White's navigation began delivering regular ark loads of coal in the final months of 1820, reaching nearly 370 tons for the year. So much had 'suddenly' reached the Philadelphia docks, and it was so new and distrusted as a fuel, it took the company until Spring to sell it. Which was a good thing, winter generally closed the canal for 3–4 months, and icing and flooding both did a certain amount of damage requiring repairs to put the canal systems back online. This was a principal advantage held by railroads over canals—such repairs were more uncommon on rail systems.) The Lehigh and Schuylkill canals had similar problems, both had to make navigable a series of rapids with rivers providing less water than was optimal—and ironically, by the 1820s, both eventually shipped coal from the opposite ends of the Little Schuylkill River's tributary, and the coal deposits once owned by Lehigh Coal Mine Company (the LCMC), in the Panther Creek Valley.

Two years after this [1823] the Schuylkill region [coal mining] was opened, while it was not until 1829 that the coal trade of the Wyoming region [i.e., the Wyoming Valley] began.

— Fred Brenckman, History of Carbon County

When the engineering challenges and finances allowed, the Schuylkill Canal began operations in 1825. The initial configuration completed in 1827, was waterway of 108 miles (174 km) was linking Philadelphia to Port Carbon in the Southern Anthracite Coal Fields near Pottsville. Combining 62 miles (100 km) of separate canals, often referred to as "reaches", with 46 miles (74 km) of slack water pools (so called "levels"), the Schuylkill Navigation used 92 lift locks to overcome the difference of 588 feet (179 m) in elevation between its terminal points. This was similar in degree to the gradients of the Lehigh Canal but twice the height drop in twice the distance, both much steeper than the Erie Canals leisurely descents. In point of fact, canals in the United States rarely kept their original configurations and improvements continued over their life; if for no other reason, periodically ice damage and freshets occur pointing out shortcomings, leading to improvements.

By the early 1820s, the coal coming down the Lehigh and Schuylkill canals having alleviated the high costs of heating, overcoming in just a few years the long suffered shortages of fuels in Eastern cities and towns (Note: Fire wood was a principle fuel for heating and charcoal for working metals, and the transport of heavy loads of wood, and the then denuded timber stands near these communities had even made it cost effective to import Bituminous coal from Great Britain and coke that before working metal furnaces. Anthracite was colloquially known as 'Stone Coal' or 'Rock Coal', and is difficult to burn without a stove or oven providing reflection and a carefully balanced bottom draft. When so provided, it burns very hot, clean and odorless, so today is still a favored fuel by specialty bakers.) The Auburn Tunnel, a 450-foot (137 m) bore through a hill near Auburn, was completed in 1821, but by 1857, due to increased traffic, canal capacity (widening) modifications turned it into an open-cut. Like the later Delaware Canal was to the Lehigh, the Union Canal, built between 1821 and 1828, was purpose designed to connect the Susquehanna River with the Schuylkill Canal at Reading. When completed, the two canals combined to make a water link between Philadelphia and the slack water level of the Susquehanna River at Middletown. This route along the Schuylkill Valley was envisioned primarily as a coal road, whilst the Union Canal was engineered for cross-state passenger and cargoes; but it also competed with and then became secondary to the east–west divisions of the Pennsylvania Canal System on the Main Line of Public Works between Philadelphia, Harrisburg, and Pittsburgh. The Schuylkill Canal also featured the first transportation tunnel in America.

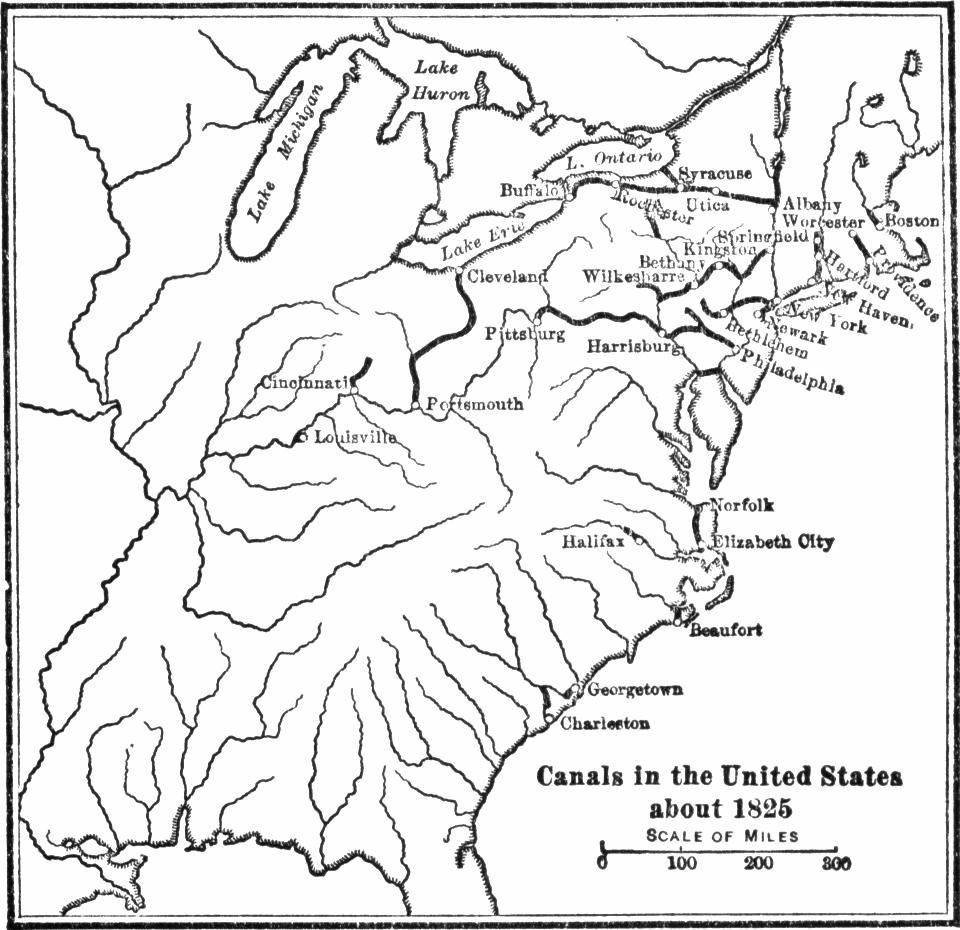
Schuylkill Canal (starting at Philadelphia) with other US canals of 1825

By transporting bulk cargoes and provide water power, the Schuylkill Navigation transformed the towns of Reading, Norristown, and Pottsville into early manufacturing centers. By using the Delaware River and the Delaware and Raritan and Morris Canals, manufactured products and anthracite from the Schuylkill Valley could also reach New York Harbor. The Schuylkill Navigation system quickly assumed a monopoly position in the transportation of anthracite coal from the coal mines of Schuylkill County to Philadelphia, and by 1841, was annually transporting over 737,517 tons of cargo.

=== Competition with the railroad ===
In 1841, the Philadelphia and Reading Railroad opened, and within four years, was hauling three times as much anthracite to Philadelphia each year as the Schuylkill Navigation. In response, the Schuylkill Navigation Company enlarged its canals; by 1847, they could accommodate the passage of boats carrying 230 tons of coal. These barges were better than twice the size that could be used on the rival Lehigh and Delaware Canals with the latter's limited lock lengths; an artifact of having a state run a practical construction project without businessmen’s balancing viewpoints. In 1850, a price-fixing arrangement with the railroad stabilized prices for the transportation of anthracite. This decade was the Schuylkill Navigation's most prosperous period; in 1859, its peak year, it transported 1,700,000 tons of cargo. However, in that same year the Philadelphia and Reading Railroad carried over 2,500,000 tons, an amount comparable to the Lehigh Canal's 1855 peak of 2,300,000 tons of coal. (Note: 2.3 million shipped in the year it became paralleled by the Lehigh Valley Railroad's and its own Lehigh and Susquehanna Railroad trackage!)

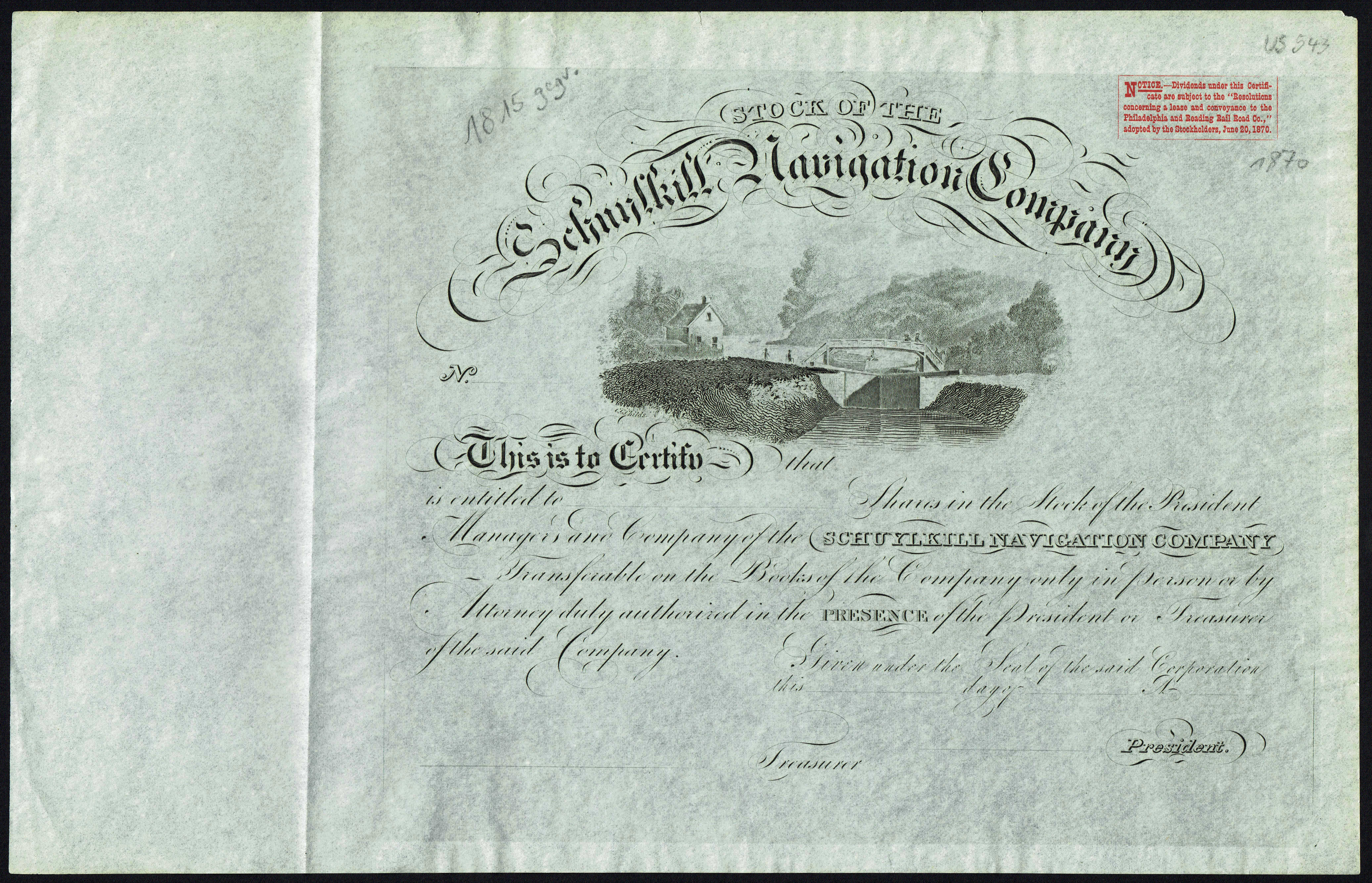
unissued share of the Schuylkill Navigation Company

During the 1860s the railroads had become the king of transportation with their improved power and speed of travel, so like most North American canals, the Schuylkill Canal began to decline in use for general freight and the wealthier westward bound passengers had long since used the Philadelphia and Columbia Railroad to reach the Pennsylvania Canal System to cross the Alleghenies. In 1857, the Pennsylvania Railroad had connected Pittsburgh and Philadelphia, would eventually add New York City and Chicago, and was instrumental in the declining fortunes of Pennsylvania's far flung network of canals. Railroads could reach mine heads and coal breakers where no stream existed to support the costly digging of a new ditch. Coal shifted away from canals to the more flexible means of bulk goods transportation. Where the established canals supplied, their markets mostly remained relatively stable and they generally remained competitive with only a gradual erosion of market share as decades passed. Eventually, oil heat and their perennial problems of delivering in winter's cold diminished their role. The self-examination during the early years of the Great Depression would end up closing most, as it did the Schuylkill Navigation Company.

=== Decline ===
In 1869 the Schuylkill Navigation was damaged by a flood, hindering operations for some time whilst repairs could be made. In 1870, its board of directors forced by stockholders, the Schuylkill Navigation Company leased its waterway to the Philadelphia and Reading Railroad for 999 years, surrendering to the competition. Under the railroad's control, the Schuylkill Navigation continued to decline as a general freight carrier, but operated primarily as a coal road, like the Lehigh and Delaware Canals into the 1930s, since for heating and especially, steam power, nearly everyone needed anthracite. The traffic on the canal was expedited by corporate maneuvers when its New York City and New Jersey markets connecting Delaware and Raritan Canal was acquired in 1872 by the competing Pennsylvania Railroad—in a blatant act supporting a bid for monopoly, soon Schuylkill boats were denied access to this important New Jersey waterway. As a result, traffic on the Schuylkill decreased rapidly. Adding insult to injury, the PRR itself invaded the Schuylkill's territory with the construction of its Schuylkill Branch in the mid-1880s.

By 1890 only 144,994 tons of cargo passed through the Schuylkill Navigation. The Schuylkill Navigation was also hindered by coal silt deposits that made its upper sections almost unusable. By 1891 the portion of Navigation above Port Clinton was abandoned. By 1904 the anthracite traffic had almost completely ceased, and after 1913 only an occasional cargo passed between Port Clinton and Philadelphia. Excursion vessels and pleasure boating remained active on the Schuylkill Navigation until most of the canals were filled by the Commonwealth of Pennsylvania during 1947–1979 in efforts to remove coal silt from the Schuylkill River.

== Chester County Canal ==
The Chester County Canal, also known as the Phoenixville Branch Canal, was an addition to the Navigation built by the Schuylkill Navigation Company in 1828 to provide water power to the Chester County Nail Works of George Thompson in Phoenixville. The new canal connected the slackwater pool of the Schuylkill Canal above the Black Rock Dam to Phoenixville. This canal paralleled the top end of the Oakes Reach, on the opposite side or the river. It also provided water power for the cotton mill of George W. Richards. The spring freshet of 1869 destroyed the cotton mill "and very much injured the canal and its locks."

== Today ==
While many of the dams still stand, few watered stretches of the canal remain. Some 2.5 miles (4.0 km) of the original 3.5 miles (5.6 km) long Oakes Reach between Oaks and Mont Clare and the 1 mile (1.6 km) reach in Manayunk. Ruins and remnants of the canals structure are still visible along its length. Many of the locks chambers still exist but are buried to varying degrees. Some of the locktender's houses still exist. Even if filled in, the canal's presence in many river communities is memorialized by several Canal Streets.

Leesport has a restored Locktender's house on E. Wall Street. The adjacent lock had long been filled with a car wash located on the site, but in 2011, the lock car wash was removed, and the lock unearthed. Near Gibraltar, the Allegheny Creek Aqueduct still exists along with a drained section of the canal prism. The Aqueduct is on the National Register of Historic Places.

=== Oakes Reach ===
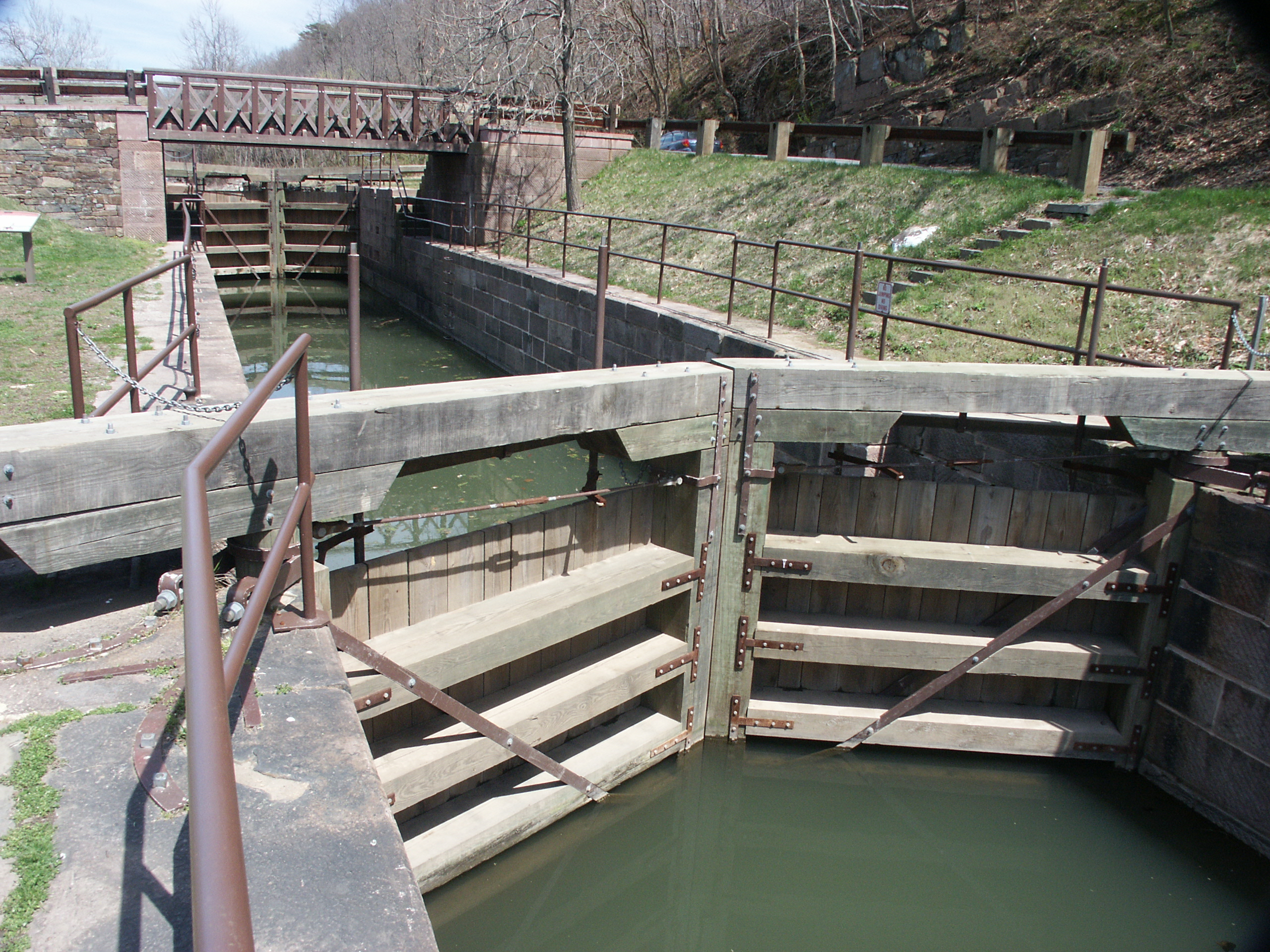
Lock 60 miter gates and tow path bridge after their 2004–05 restoration

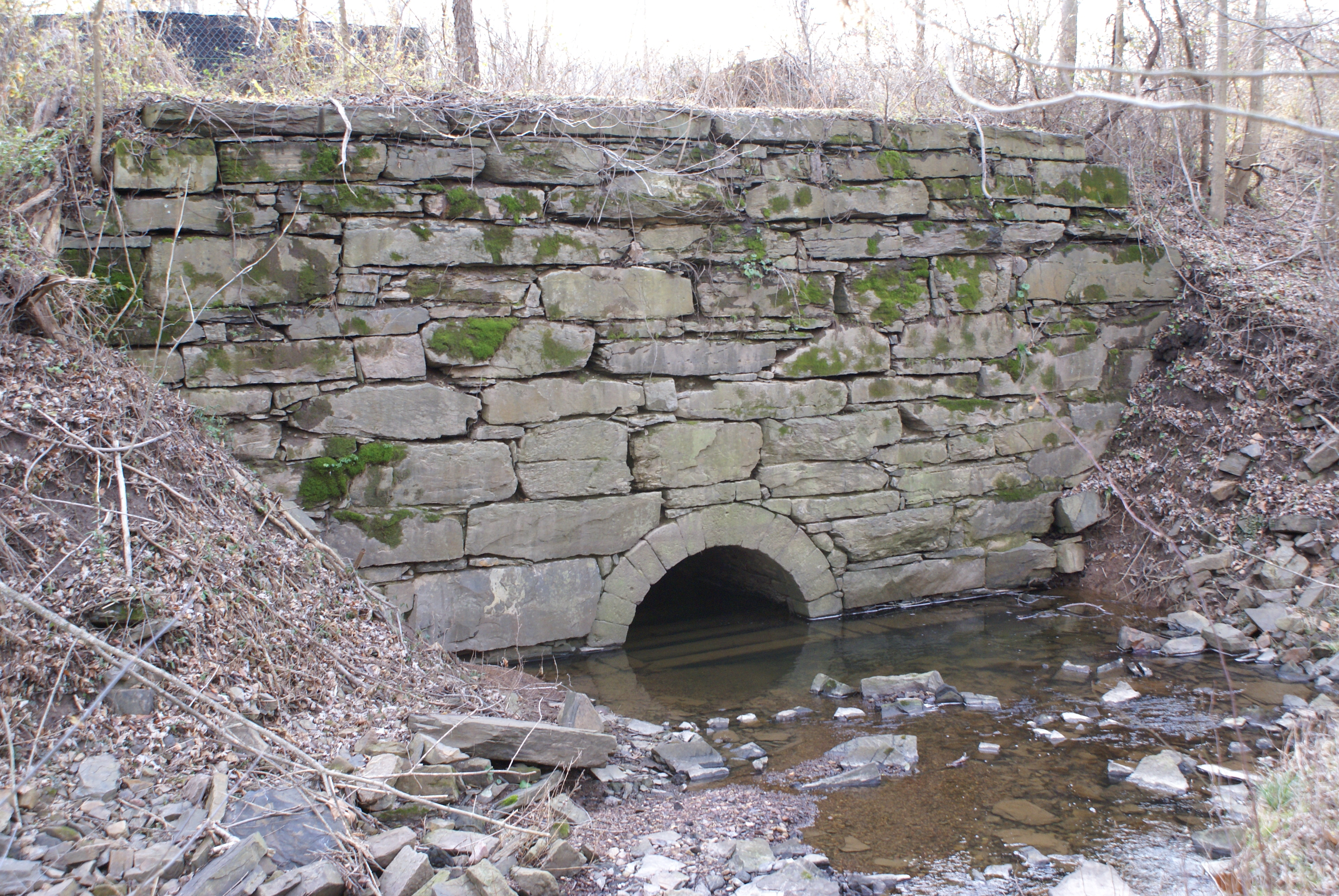
Canal aqueduct over Crossman's Run, near Oaks

The head of the Oakes Reach is at the Black Rock Dam (Dam #26), near Mont Clare. The canal passes through the dam structure at Lock #60. The volunteer Schuylkill Canal Association has restored Lock 60 to operating condition.

The nearby locktender's house has also been restored. The Reach runs under Pennsylvania Route 29 in Mont Clare, directly across the river from Phoenixville, then through Port Providence. An impounding basin from the silt removal project cuts the canal after Longford Road and the final mile of the Reach, has been filled in. An old stone aqueduct, that carried the Canal over Crossman's Run, and the outlet lock tender's house are still existent; but Lock 61, Brower's Lock, was filled in.

This reach is named for Thomas Oakes, chief engineer of the Schuylkill Navigation Company. The Oakes Reach canal, locks, locktenders' houses, Black Rock Dam, and the slackwater pool extending up to the Pennsylvania Route 113 bridge form the "Schuylkill Navigation Canal, Oakes Reach Section" historic district.

On December 30, 2017 what is thought to be the non-mechanized, human powered speed record was set on the Oakes Reach by Todd Martin, originally of Mont Clare. The record of 19 minutes 38 seconds, was set on ice skates from the existing waste water control valve structure at the lower end to the Lock 60 Lower Lock Head Wall. The distance traveled for the record is 2.33 miles. 3" of snow was present on the ice, temp 14 F, head wind approximately 10–15 mph.

- Lock 60 40°08′42″N 75°30′28″W
- Present end of reach 40°07′42″N 75°28′57″W
- Lock 61 Tender's House 40°07′34.6″N 75°27′40.9″W

=== Manayunk Reach ===
The head of the Manayunk Reach is at the Flat Rock Dam (Dam 31), near Shawmont. The canal originally passed through the dam structure at Lock 68. However Lock 68 is plated off, and the forereach area above has silted in.

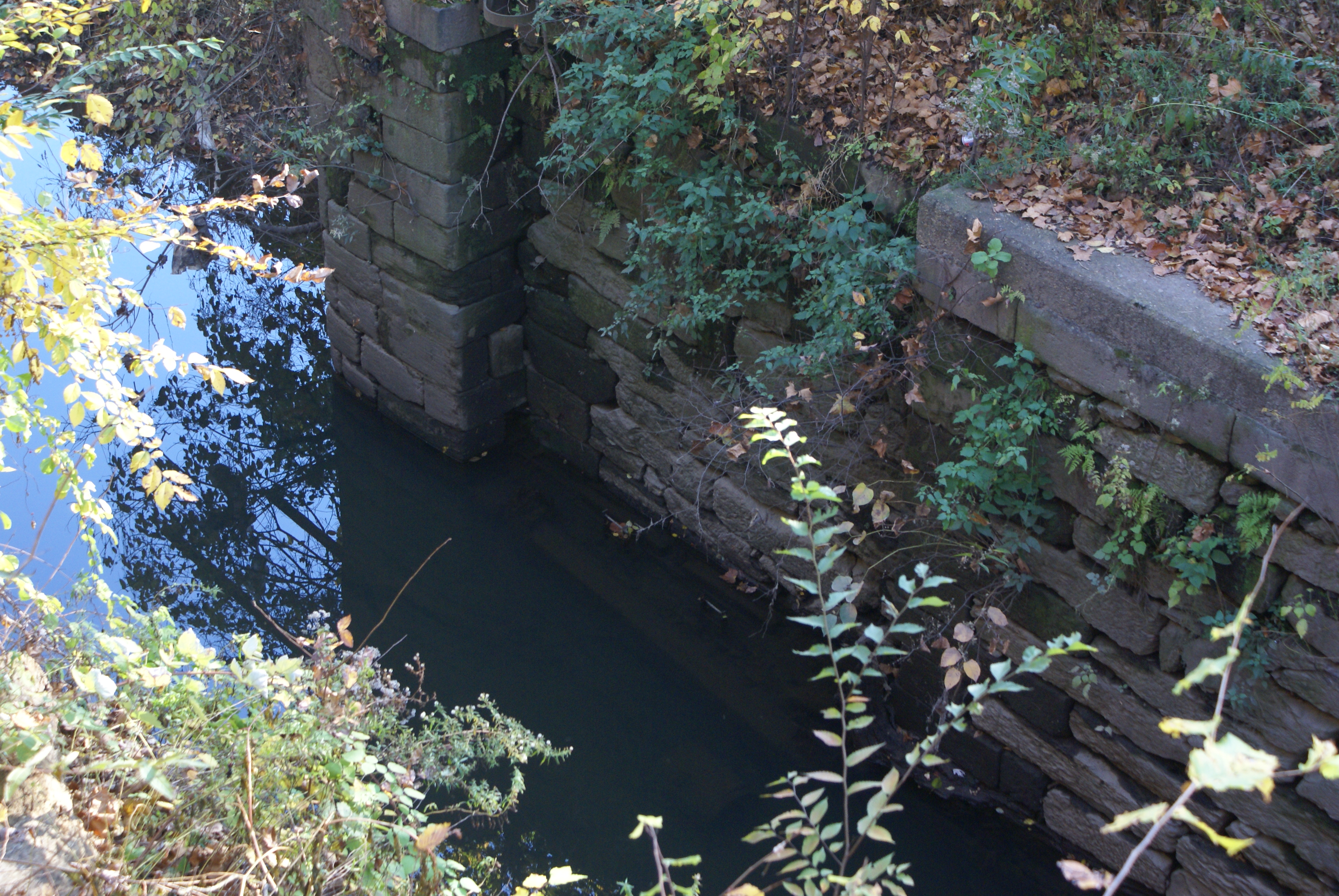
Remains of Lock 70 at the outlet of the Manayunk Reach

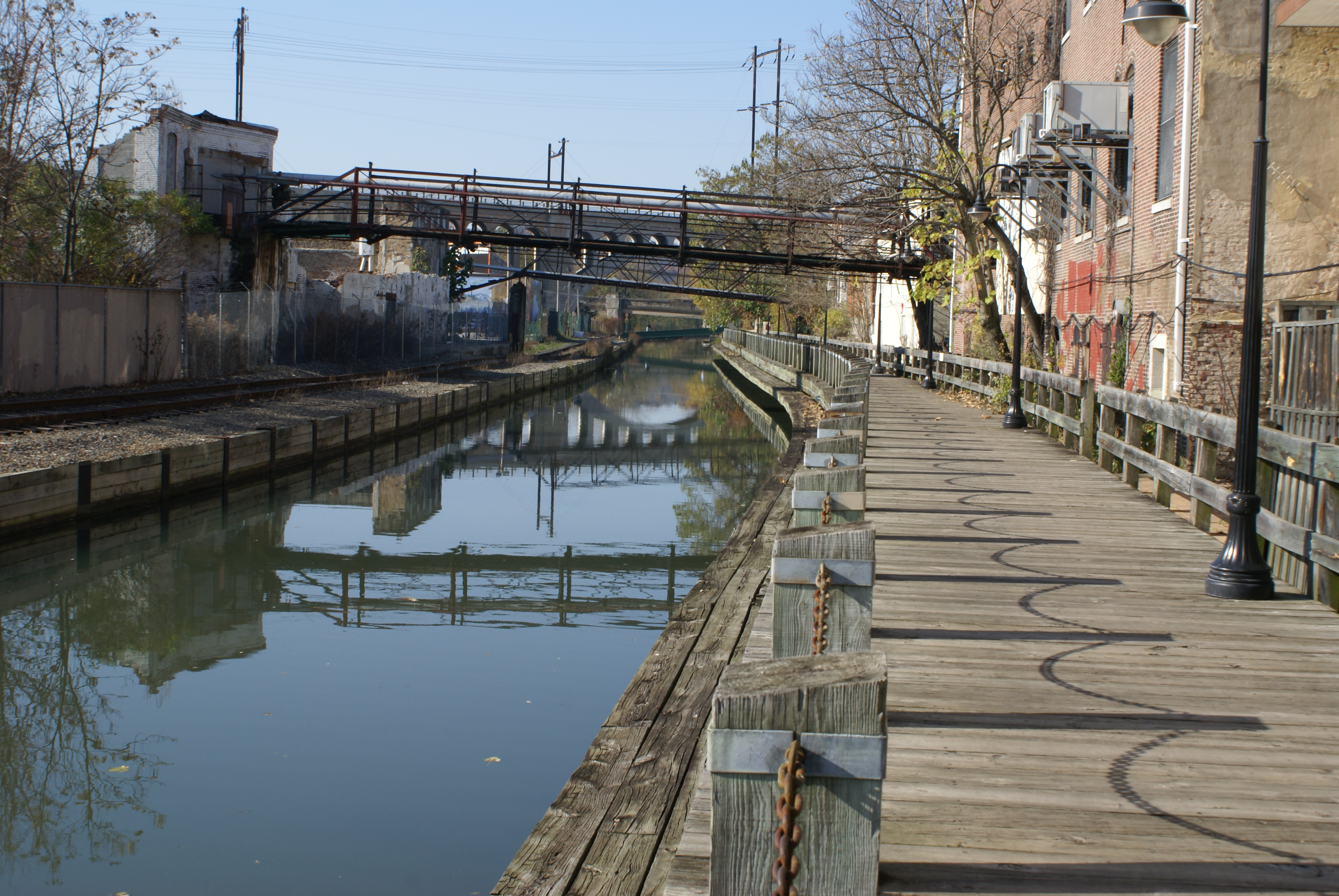
Manayunk Reach, a very industrial section of the Navigation

This stretch of canal forms the northern side of Venice Island, which is facing development pressures. At the downstream end of this reach, the canal runs through Manayunk and returns to the river via Locks 69 & 70. All three lock structures still exist.

- Lock 68 40°02′17″N 75°14′40″W
- Locks 69&70 40°01′22″N 75°13′11.5″W

=== Schuylkill River Trail ===
The Schuylkill River Trail (SRT) now overlays portions of the canal route. In Manayunk, the Trail was constructed across the canal from the towpath. (The Reading railroad built a freight spur on the canal towpath.) In 2008 the extension of the Schuylkill River Trail from the Perkiomen Creek to Longford Road in Oaks opened. This length of the Trail makes use of the general course of the filled portion of the Oakes Reach and originally used the old canal aqueduct to cross Crossman's Run. On 14 February 2008, a meeting was held to announce the survey work for the extension of the Schuylkill River Trail along the towpath of the watered portion of the Oakes Reach. It was expected that the towpath restoration itself would commence around March 2009. Restoration of the canal towpath between Longford Road and Mont Clare is now complete. However, this one-mile-long segment of Schuylkill River Trail is a narrow crushed-stone path, designed for pedestrians and slower bicycles. Cyclists who prefer higher speeds are encouraged to ride on parallel Walnut Street, rather than the Longford Road-to-Mont Clare section of tow-path.

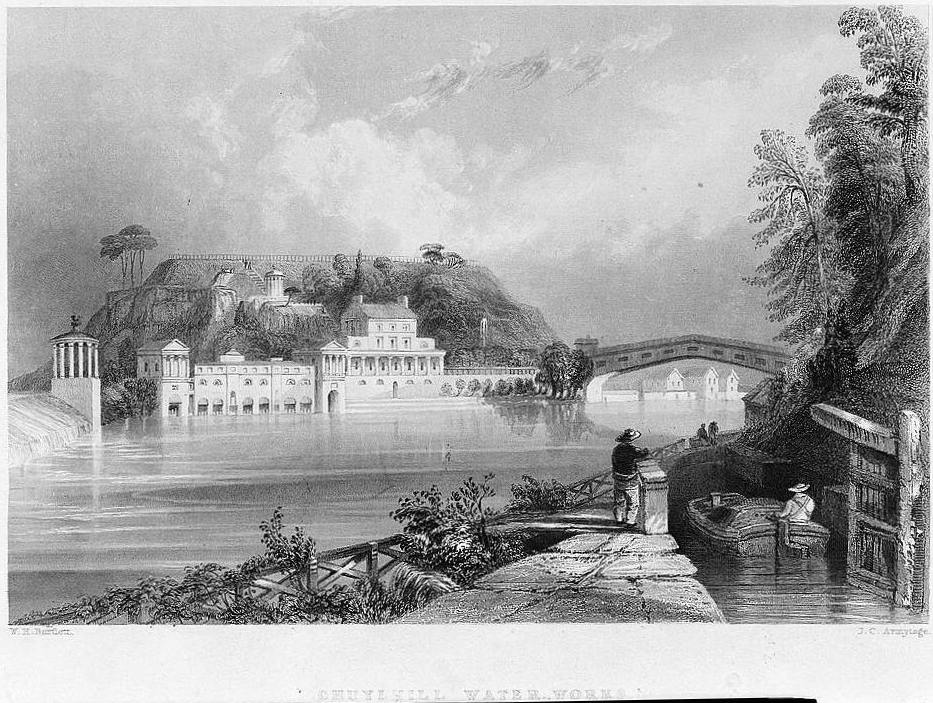
"Schuylkill Waterworks" (1835), with Schuylkill Canal in the foreground.

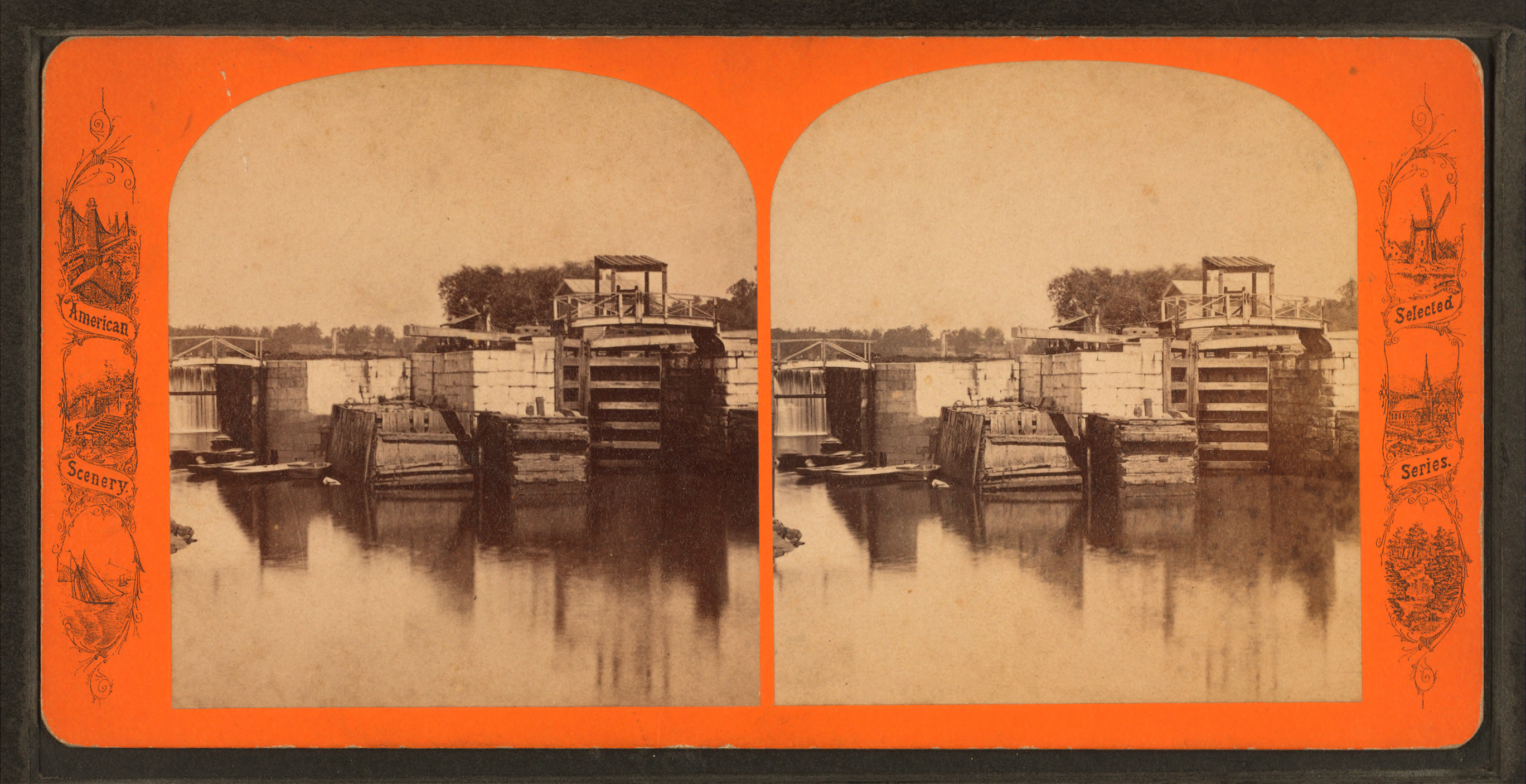
Locks on Schuylkill Canal.

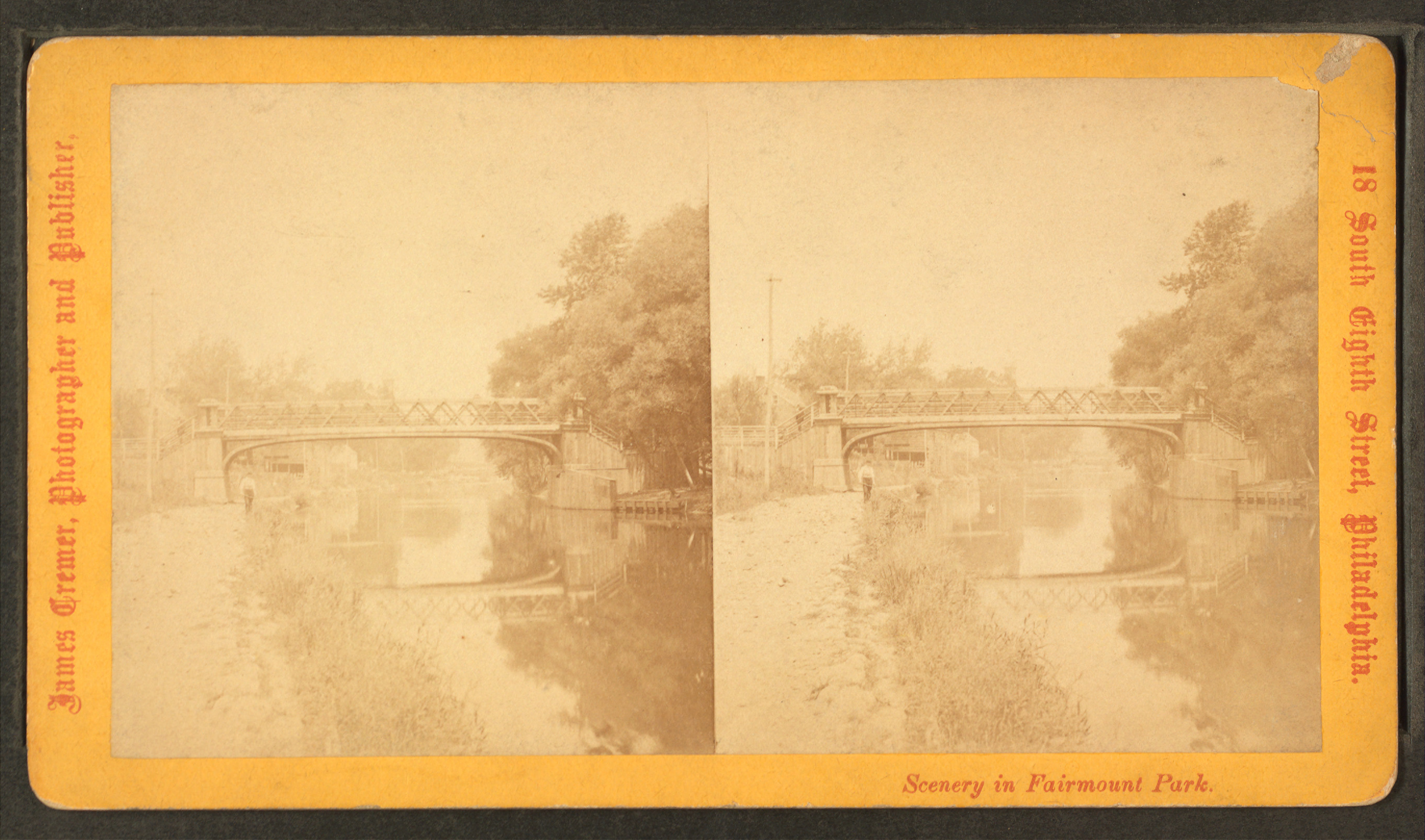
Bridge over Schuylkill Canal.

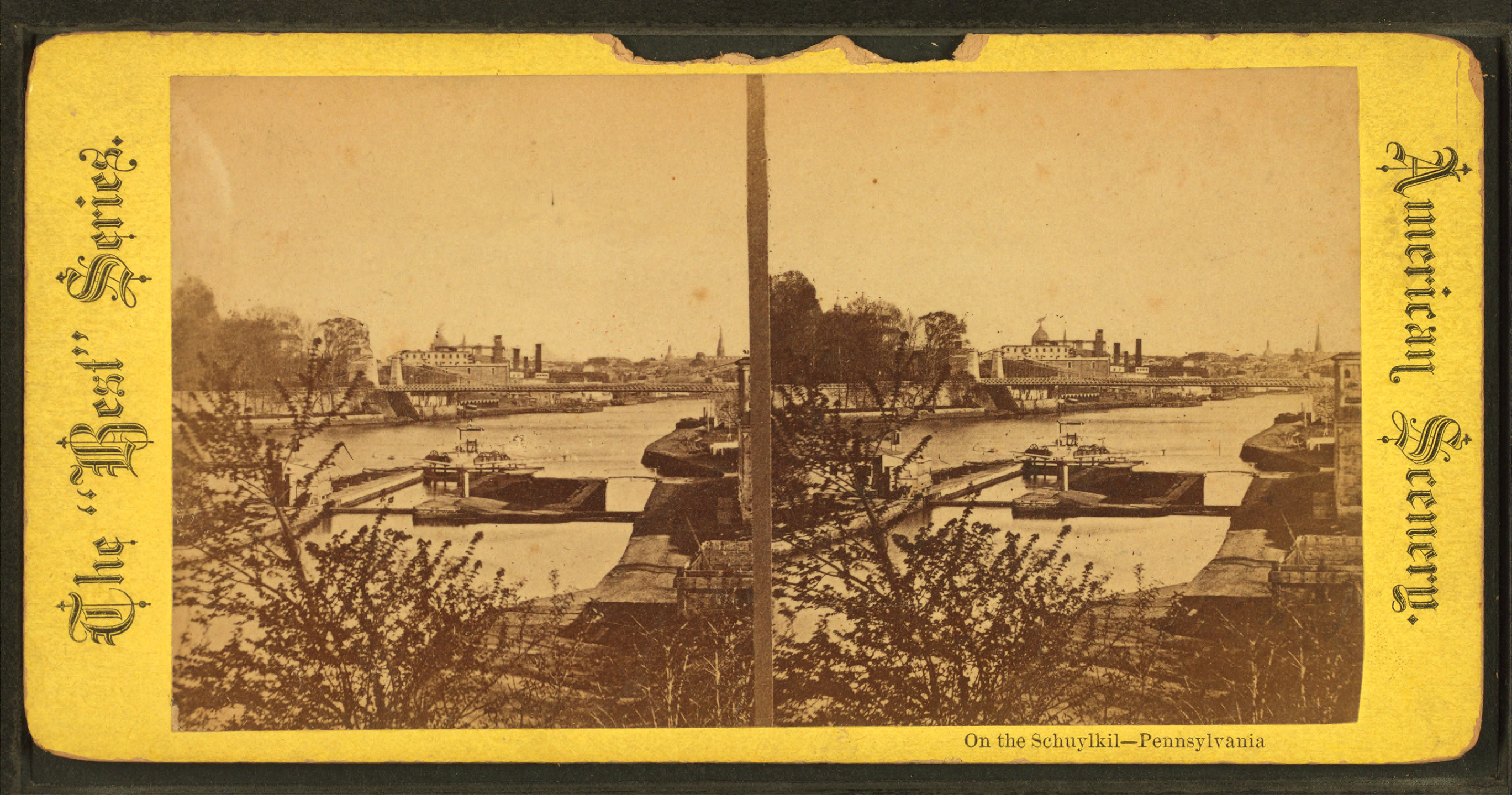
Mouth of the Schuylkill Canal, below Fairmount Dam, Philadelphia. The Wire Bridge (background) stood at the site of the current Spring Garden Street Bridge.

== See also ==
- Allegheny Aqueduct
- List of canals in the United States
- Delaware Canal – A sister canal from the mouth of the Lehigh River and canal terminus, feeding urban Philadelphia connecting with the Morris and Lehigh Canals at their respective Easton terminals.
- Delaware and Raritan Canal – A New Jersey canal connection to the New York & New Jersey markets shipping primarily coal across the Delaware River. The D&R also shipped Iron Ore from New Jersey up the Lehigh.
- Delaware and Schuylkill navigation company- 1791 private stock company that failed and was a predecessor to the 1815 Schuylkill Navigation company.
- Chesapeake and Delaware Canal – A canal crossing the Delmarva Peninsula in the states of Delaware and Maryland, connecting the Chesapeake Bay with the Delaware Bay.
- Delaware and Hudson Canal – Another early built coal canal as the American canal age began; contemporary with the Lehigh and the Schuylkill navigations.
- Lehigh Canal – the coal canal along the Lehigh Valley that fed the United States early Industrial revolution energy needs directly and via the Delaware Canal businesses all along the forty miles to Philadelphia from Easton, Pennsylvania. (Note: If the Lehigh Canal hadn't been built, the Delaware Canal would have had nothing worth the expense to ship, so the investment would never have happened. The principal customer of the Delaware was the coal barges coming down the Lehigh shipped by Lehigh Coal & Navigation Company, which also came to manage the Delaware Canal into the 1960s.)
- Morris Canal – Another important American Industrial Revolution canal feeding steel mills ores from Central New Jersey and coal to New York and New Jersey Markets.
- Pennsylvania Canal System – an ambitious collection of far-flung canals, and eventually railroads authorized early in 1826.
- Schuylkill Canal – Navigation joining Reading, PA and Philadelphia. (Note: The Schuylkill Canal was long delayed by investors quarreling over the best way to proceed. Disgusted, White and Erskine Hazard explored tapping Anthracite supplies via the Lehigh, and ended up incorporating the Lehigh Coal & Navigation Company which spearheaded many technological initiatives.)
- Schuylkill and Susquehanna Navigation Company – 1791 predecessor private stock company that failed.
- Union canal – 1811 private stock company that completed the "golden link between the Schuylkill and Susquehanna rivers in 1828, thereby connecting the Schuylkill Navigation company with the Pennsylvania canal in Middleton.
