= Jacob's Ford (disambiguation) =

Jacob's Ford may refer to:

- Bnot Ya'akov Bridge, site of an ancient ford across the River Jordan in Israel
  - Battle of Jacob's Ford (1179) Battle between crusaders and Ayyubids
- Mont Clare Bridge, site of a ford, called Jacob's Ford for a time, across the Schuylkill River in Pennsylvania, USA

== See also ==
- Jacob Ford (disambiguation)
