= Venice Island =

Venice Island may refer to:

- Venice Island (California), an island in the Sacramento-San Joaquin River Delta in California
- Venice Island (Pennsylvania), formed by the Schuylkill River Canal, near the Manayunk section of Philadelphia

== See also ==
- Venice (disambiguation)
