= Venice Island (Pennsylvania) =

Coordinates: 40°01′49″N 75°14′02″W

Venice Island is a piece of land formed by the Manayunk Canal and the Schuylkill River, near Manayunk, Philadelphia, Pennsylvania. A mill site in the 19th century, it has recently become the site of a somewhat controversial urban development in a flood plain. Upstream of Venice Island is the Flat Rock Dam and directly adjacent is the Manayunk Canal Towpath. The island is now home to the Venice Island Performing Arts and Recreation Center (VIPARC) and residential apartment buildings.

== History ==
The Flat Rock Dam and Manayunk Canal were a part of the Schuylkill Navigation System. The Manayunk Canal was a man-made canal that opened around 1820s. The creation of the Manayunk Canal resulted in the formation of Venice Island. Due to its location on the river, Venice Island became and ideal spot for industrial mills. The Manayunk Canal was a source of coal transportation and hydropower to the mill sites on Venice Island. The rise in the railroad industry was the direct result of the Manayunk Canal closing in the 1940s as ships were no longer used to transport coal. Consequently, the water in the Manayunk Canal became stagnant leading to unclean water, health issues, algae blooms, and a rise in pollution. The Philadelphia Water Department has rehabilitated the intake at the site of the former lock, and reopened water flow to the canal in the Spring of 2025 in order to meet the Clean Water Act standards. The reopening of the Manayunk Canal will improve the river's ecosystem and the overall health of the water, and colonies of live freshwater bivalves have been introduced to provide natural filtration of the canal.

== Flood events ==
Venice Island is located on a floodplain, making the island a high-risk flood zone. Below are flood events that have impacted Venice Island:

- 1822 - Manayunk flooded.
- 1839 - Flood results in Flat Rock Bridge needing to be rebuilt.
- 1841 - Manayunk flooded.
- 1850 - The rebuilt Flat Rock Bridge and two dams are destroyed.
- 1869 - Green Lane Bridge is destroyed due to high flood waters.
- 1889 - Severe flooding results in loss of lives and buildings.
- 1894 - Manayunk flooded.
- 1902 - Severe flood.
- 1933 - Manayunk flooded.
- 1935 - Parts of the Schuylkill River flooded.
- 1936 - Manayunk flooded.
- 1942 - Parts of the Schuylkill River flooded.
- 1948 - Manayunk flooded.
- 1972 - Severe flooding due to Hurricane Agnes results in Philadelphia joining the National Flood Insurance Program.
- 1996 - Venice Island flooded.
- 1999 - Hurricane Floyd results in Manayunk flooded.
- 2011 - Hurricane Irene results in flooding.
- 2014 - Flash Flooding.
- 2021 - Hurricane Ida results in massive flooding.

== Development ==
VIPARC is a multi-use recreational facility with amenities such as an outdoor basketball and volleyball court, a children's spray park, and an intimate 250 seat capacity theater. This project was completed in 2014 with the collaboration of the Philadelphia Water Department, Philadelphia Parks & Recreation, and the people of Manayunk. The Venice Island Project included green infrastructure in the form of a green roof, rain gardens, and a multimillion gallon storage basin which was carried out by the Philadelphia Water Department. VIPARC is managed by the Philadelphia Parks & Recreation.

== See also ==
- Manayunk
- Schuylkill River
- Philadelphia
