= Christian to Crescent Trail Connector bridge =

Bridge in Philadelphia, Pennsylvania, US

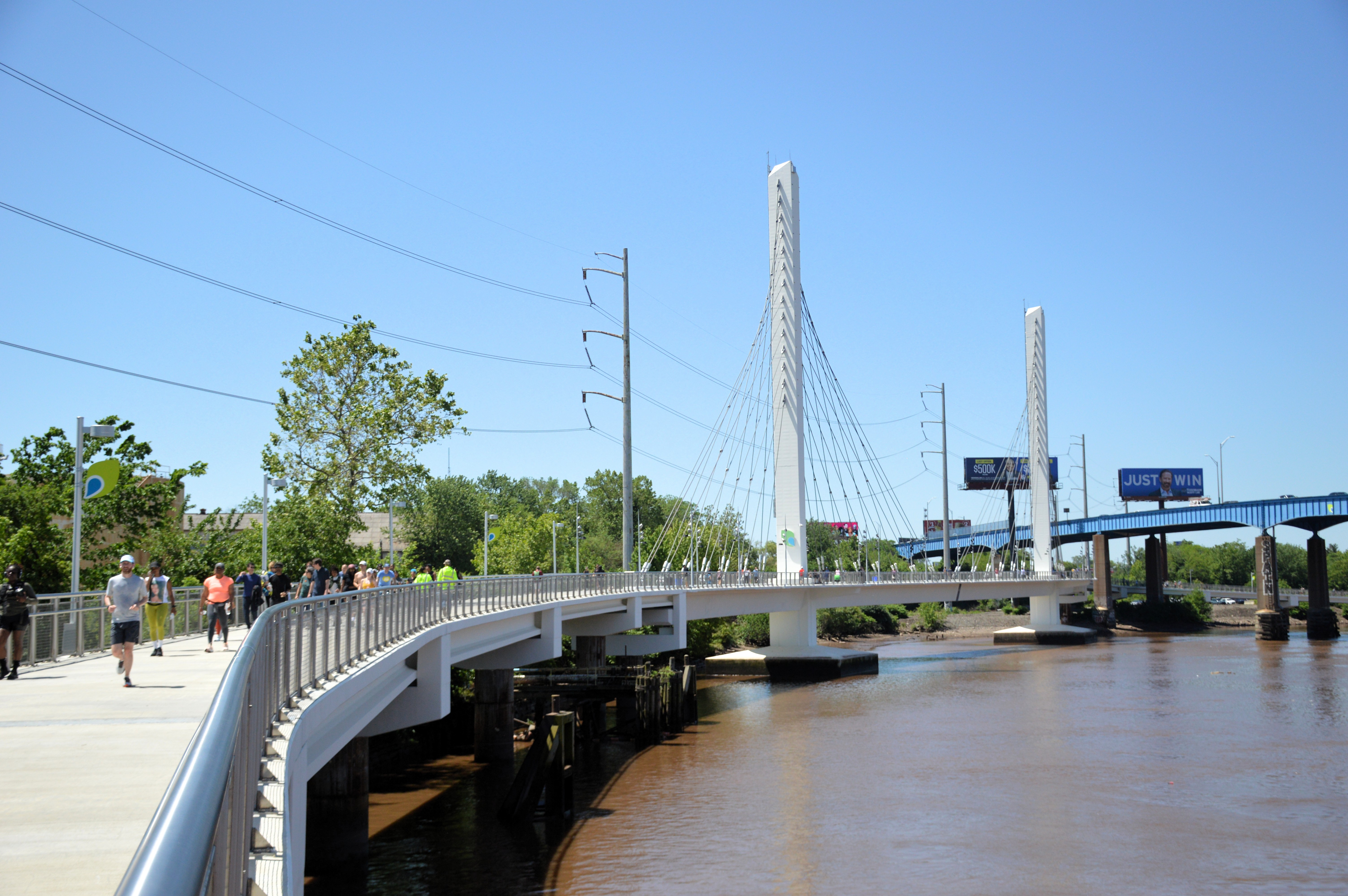
- The Christian to Crescent Trail Connector bridge carries the Schuylkill River Trail on its opening day, May 17, 2025.
- Coordinates: 39°56′30″N 75°11′36″W
- Carries: Schuylkill River Trail
- Locale: Philadelphia, Pennsylvania, US

Characteristics
- Design: woven-harp cable-stayed bridge, beam bridge
- Width: 25 ft (7.6 m)
- Height: Towers: 168 ft (51.2 m)
- Longest span: 650 ft (198.1 m)
- Clearance below: 20 ft (6.1 m)

History
- Architect: Bradley Touchstone, AECOM
- Designer: AECOM
- Constructed by: PKF-Mark III, Inc.
- Construction cost: $22 million
- Opened: May 17, 2025

Location
- Interactive map of Christian to Crescent Trail Connector bridge

The Christian to Crescent Trail Connector bridge is a cable-stayed bridge that runs along the east bank of the Schuylkill River between Christian Street and Grays Ferry Crescent in Philadelphia, Pennsylvania, United States. It carries part of the Schuylkill River Trail, which is itself part of the East Coast Greenway. Built and maintained by the City of Philadelphia Streets Department, it opened in 2025. The bridge was designed to encourage residents of South and Southwest Philadelphia to access Center City without a car; motorized traffic is not permitted on the bridge.

== History ==
In 2009, the Fairmount Park Commission approved purchase of land to extend the Schuylkill River Trail south from its then-terminus at South Street to Christian Street. The new segment opened in 2018, dead-ending at Christian Street. The trail's southbound continuation on land was impeded by a Veolia steam energy plant that sits on the bank of the Schuylkill and requires water access to receive occasional gas deliveries by boat.

In addition, a freight rail line known as the Philadelphia Subdivision hugs the east bank, which left little room for a trail. The freight line is operated by CSX Transportation, which donated a small plot between the tracks and the river to the city to facilitate trail construction.

A feasibility study was conducted in 2019, and in 2020, the City of Philadelphia applied for a federal permit to construct the bridge. The bridge opened on May 17, 2025. The main cable-stayed span cost $22 million to construct, and the overall project cost $48 million.

== Design ==
The bridge rises above the Schuylkill River, but unlike most bridges, does not cross from one bank to the other. Instead, it connects the Schuylkill River Trail to the Grays Ferry Crescent, which were previously separated by a rail line and industrial area.

The cable-stayed bridge has two towers and a woven harp design, with a main span of 650 feet about 20 feet above the water. The main span follows an S-curve. The northern and southern approaches are beam bridges constructed on piers sunk into the river. It follows the east bank of the river, passing under the Schuylkill Arsenal Railroad Bridge and the Schuylkill Expressway Bridge. Users have views of the river and the University of Pennsylvania baseball field on the west bank from the overlooks near each tower. At night, the bridge is illuminated.
