= Schuylkill River Trail =

Multi-use trail in Pennsylvania, United States

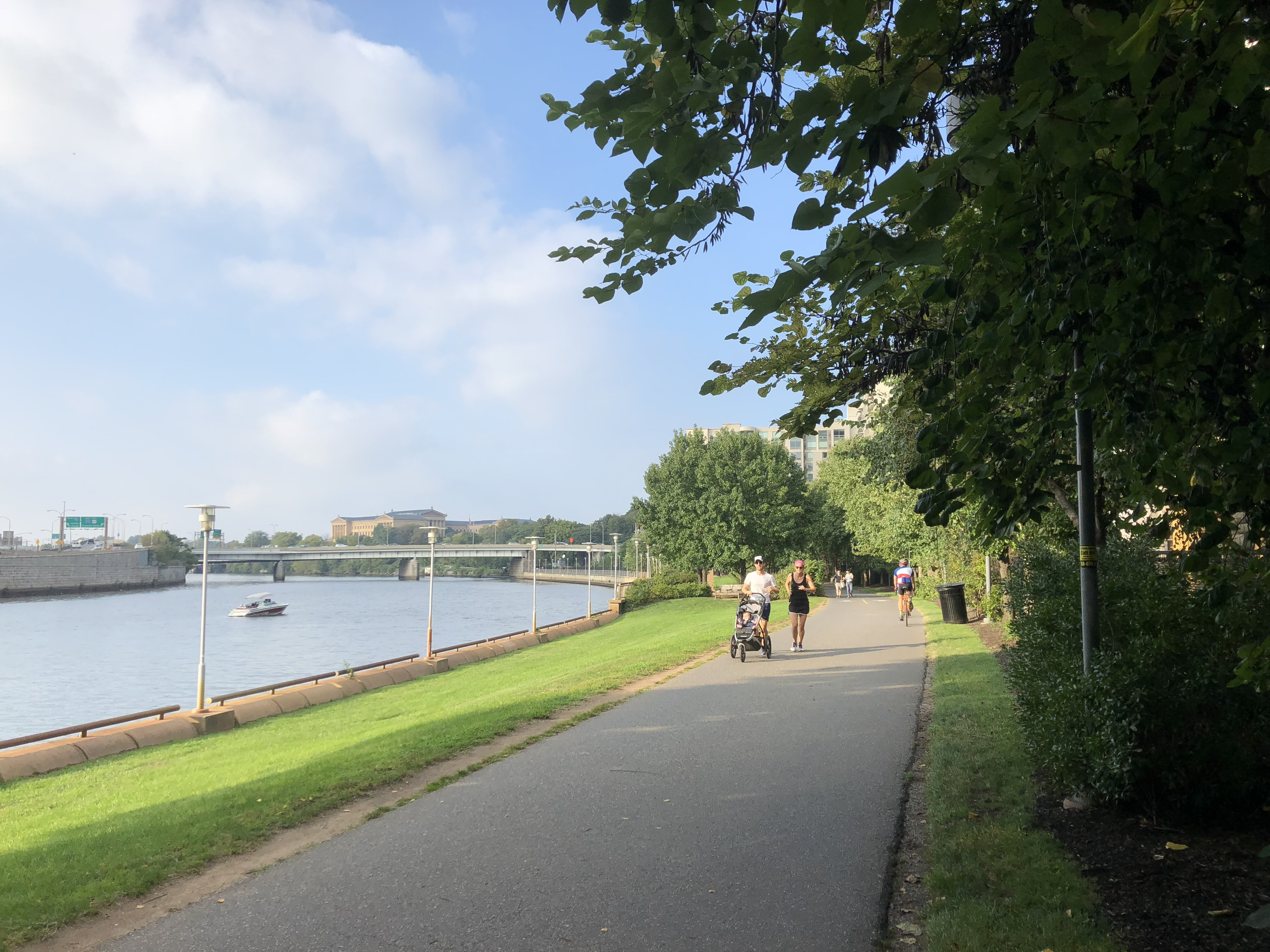
- The trail runs along the Schuylkill River in Philadelphia, near the Philadelphia Museum of Art
- Location: Philadelphia; Montgomery County; Chester County; Berks County; Schuylkill County
- Use: Multi-use trail
- Season: All
- Sights: Philadelphia Museum of Art; Fairmount Water Works; Valley Forge National Historical Park; French Creek State Park
- Surface: Paved; Crushed stone; Wooden boardwalk; On-road
- Maintainer: Schuylkill River Development Corp.; Montgomery County; Chester County; Schuylkill River Greenway Assn.
- Website: schuylkillriver.org/schuylkill-river-trail/

The Schuylkill River Trail (/ˈskuːlkɪl/ SKOOL-kil, locally /-kəl/) is a multi-use trail along the banks of the Schuylkill River in southeastern Pennsylvania, United States. Partially complete, the trail is ultimately planned to run about 120 miles (190 km) from the river's headwaters in Schuylkill County to Fort Mifflin in Philadelphia.

Completed portions of the trail include a section from Auburn to Hamburg, a 19.5-mile (31.4 km) portion from Reading to Pottstown, and a more-than-30-mile (48 km) portion from Oaks to Bartram's Garden in Southwest Philadelphia.

Large stretches of the trail are rail trails. Parts of it belong to the East Coast Greenway, a 3,000-mile (4,800 km) trail system connecting Maine and Florida.

On many maps and street atlases, and on some of the trail's signage, the segment between Philadelphia and Valley Forge is still identified by the older name Philadelphia–Valley Forge Trail.

== Route description and history ==
=== Auburn to Pottstown ===
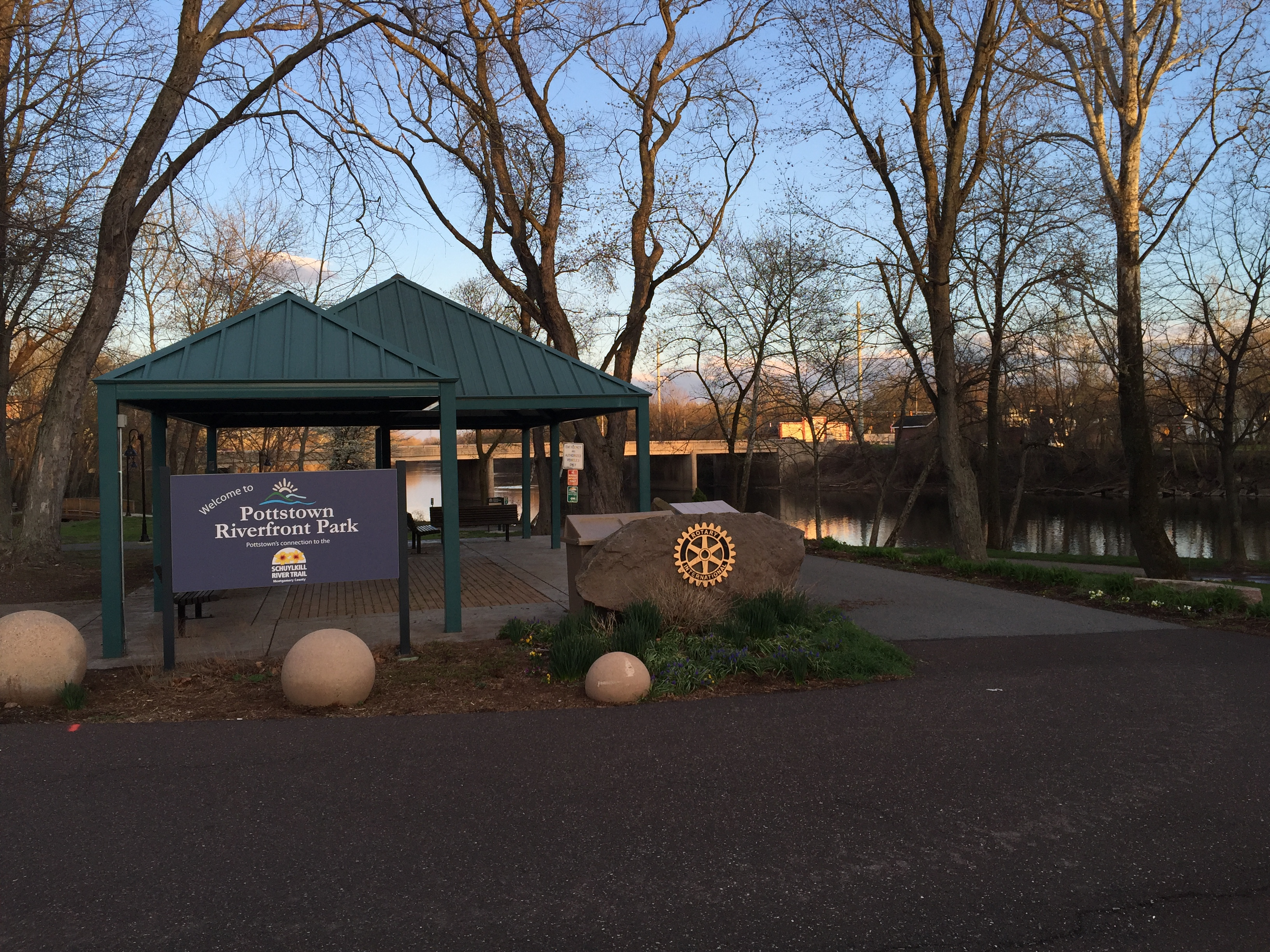
Schuylkill River Trail at the Pottstown Riverfront Park

The Schuylkill River Trail begins at a trailhead at the Kernsville Dam in Auburn just above Hamburg. The trail runs through Reading to Pottstown until it reaches the Riverfront Park on College Drive near the Reading Railroad Pottstown Station. This section passes through the Schuylkill River National and State Heritage Area, an area generally known for recreational fishing.

In lower Berks County, the trail follows the existing Thun Trail, named for industrialist Ferdinand Thun, who founded the Textile Machine Works in Reading in 1892 (later moved to the borough of Wyomissing, a suburb of Reading, in 1896). Plans are underway for a connection from Reading, north to Hamburg. The current northern edge links the trail with the Union Canal towpath.

The trail begins in North Reading, along Riverview Drive, then quickly crosses an old railroad bridge into West Reading. It then continues as a mixed-surface path of macadam, gravel, coarse stone, and chalk to Gibraltar where it becomes a poorly marked on-road bicycle route following Old River Road and Schuylkill Road to Birdsboro. From there, the trail follows the old concrete industrial collector, Armorcast Road, to the rear entrance of a ballfield. The trail then goes off-road as a gravel path to the county line where it meets the paved Schuylkill River Trail, which currently terminates in Pottstown.

=== Pottstown to Phoenixville / Mont Clare ===
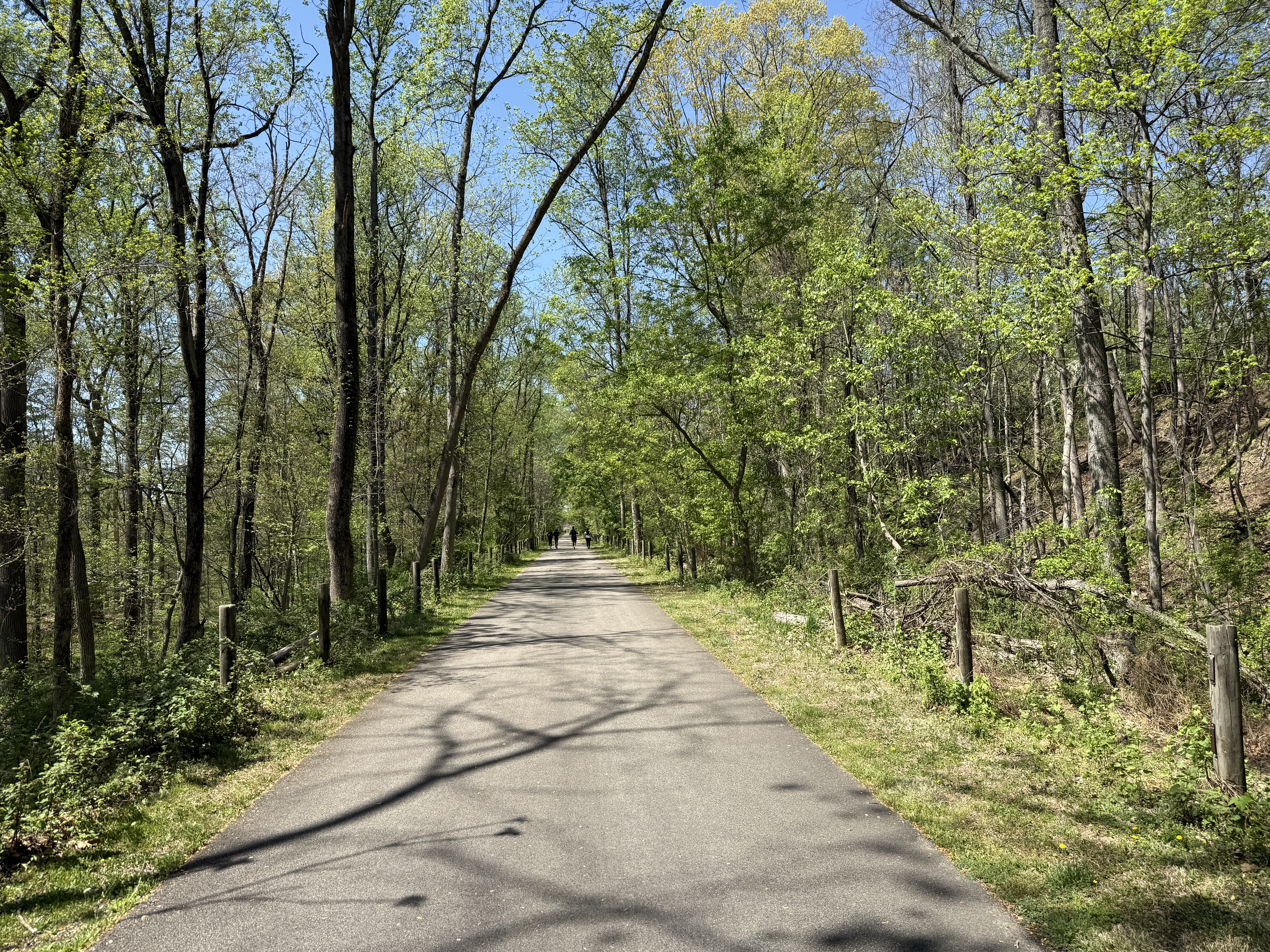
Trail in Valley Forge National Historical Park

Two routes have been proposed for this stretch. One would come down the right bank (Chester County side) and end near Cromby Generating Station, above Phoenixville, then use borough streets and the Mont Clare Bridge (PA 29) to connect with the trail section along the Canal in Mont Clare. The other plan would bring the trail down the left bank to Mont Clare. It appears that both options may eventually be built, with the Chester County trail proceeding first and carrying the main SRT designation.

In April 2011, the Spring City-to-Cromby segment opened on the Chester County side. This segment includes a new trailhead on Township Line Road, near the Cromby Power Plant.

Until 2020, there was a disconnect in the official SRT between Phoenixville and Mont Clare, although foot and bicycle traffic easily used the Mont Clare Bridge sidewalk to connect. In 2019-2020 the sidewalk was replaced with a 10 foot wide, barrier protected trail segment, officially closing the gap.

=== Mont Clare to Oaks ===
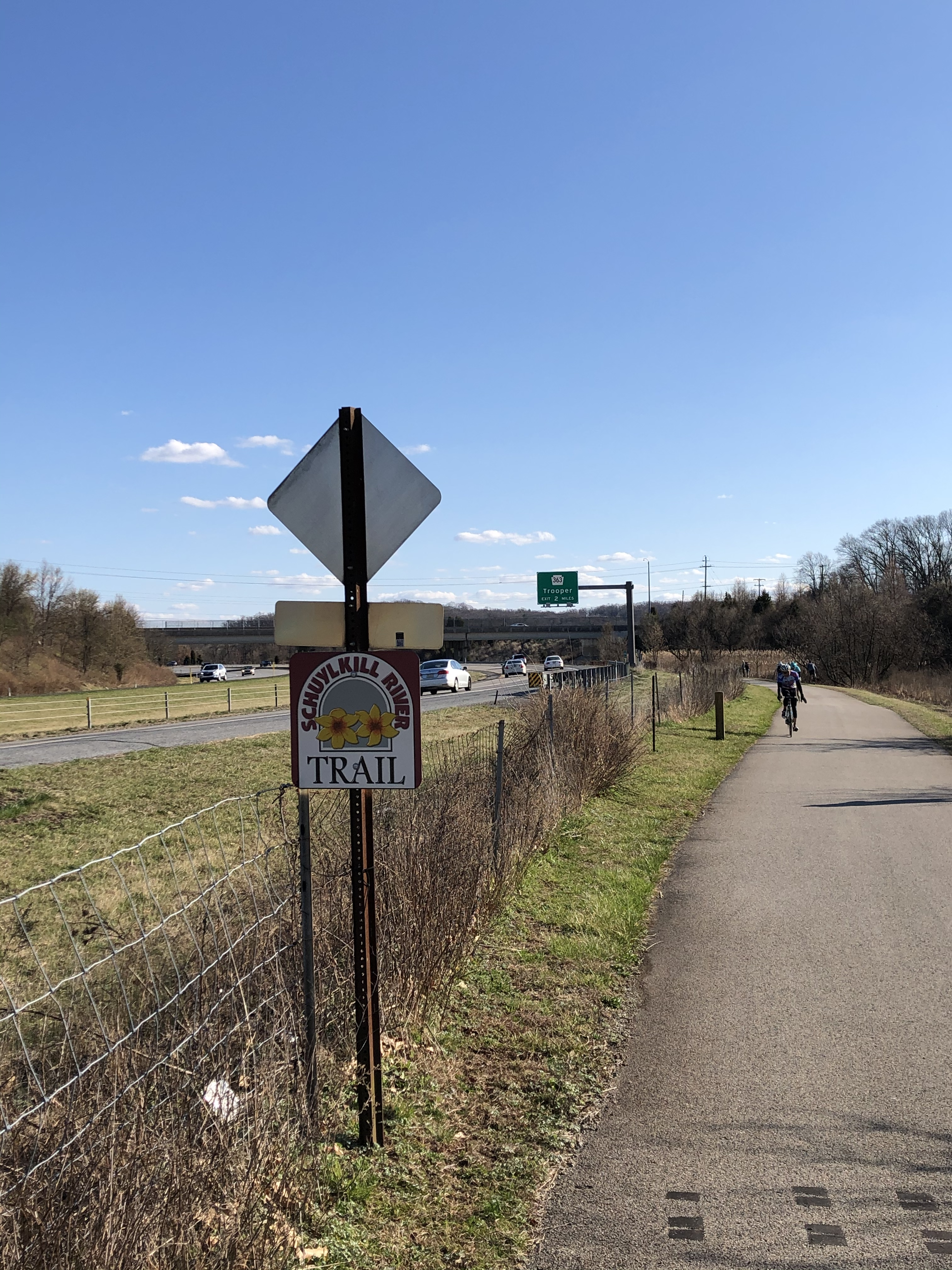
The trail in Montgomery County next to U.S. Route 422

The stretch of trail from Mont Clare to the Perkiomen Creek near Oaks opened in the spring of 2008. In the first phase of construction the southern section of the trail between Longford Road at the present watered end of the Oakes Reach of the Schuylkill Canal and the Oaks intersection with the Perkiomen Trail was constructed. This section follows much of the filled portion of the Oakes Reach and is paved except for a gravel segment of about half a mile (which also includes a short trail detour). To cross the three streams in this section, two new culverts were constructed and the trail temporarily routed over a historical aqueduct from the Canal at Crossman's Run. A new bridge was built across Crossman's Run for the trail and the paving was completed.

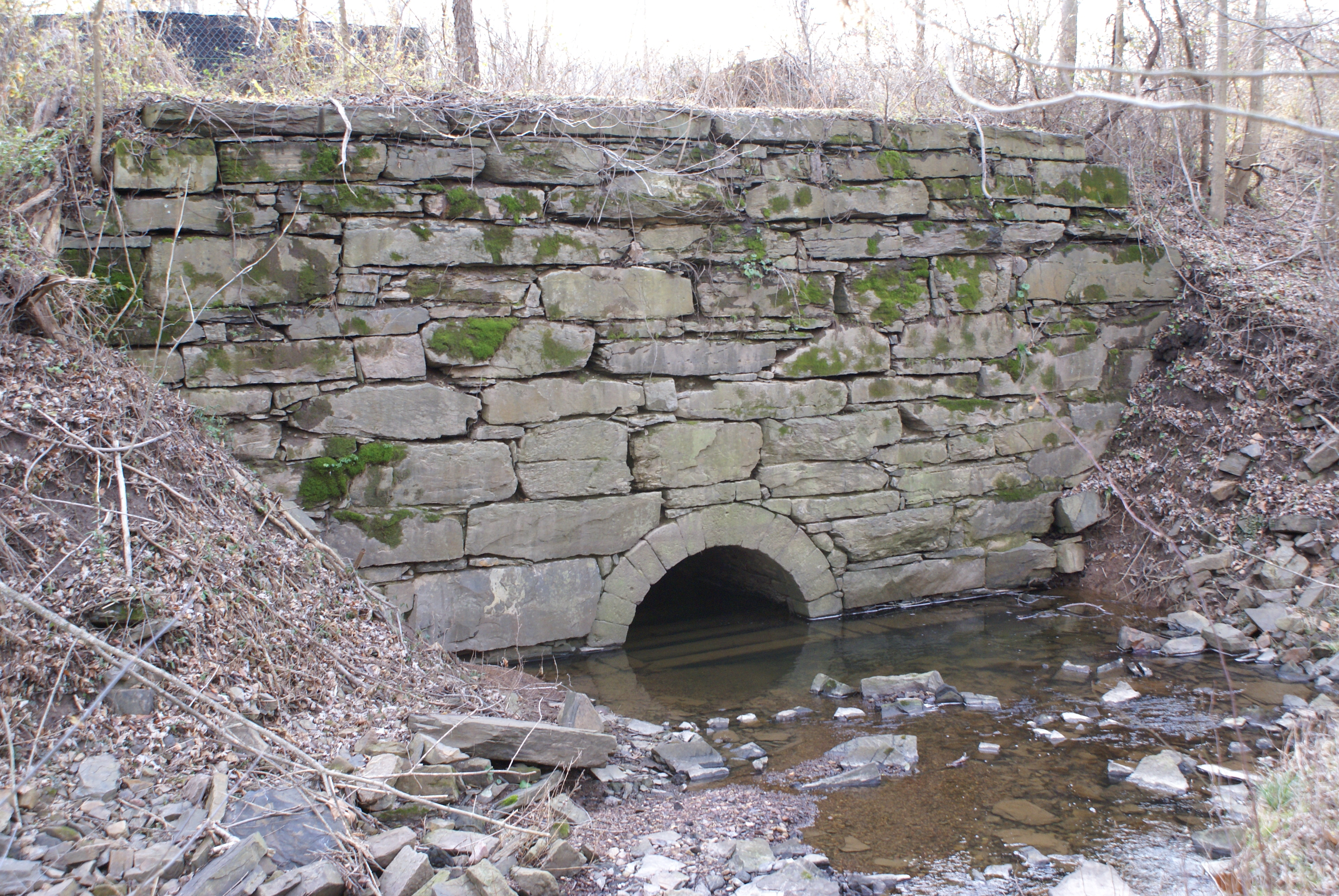
The historic Schuylkill Canal aqueduct carries the trail over Crossman's Run near Oaks

For phase 1, the northern section, upstream of Longford Road, is signed along the low volume Port Providence Road and Walnut Street, which run along the left bank of the Canal, to reach Mont Clare. In a second phase of construction for the northern segment, the Canal towpath on the canal right bank will be refurbished, and a small bridge constructed over a spillway near Port Providence. On February 14, 2008, a meeting was held to announce the survey work for the Phase 2 extension. This would provide an off-road alternative between Longford Road and Mont Clare. It was expected that the towpath restoration itself would commence in the fall of 2010, but Montgomery County put the project on hold due to budget constraints. In early 2013, construction was started on the towpath portion of the trail with improvements to the Route 29 underpass and construction of a new spillway and foot bridge opposite Port Providence.

=== Oaks to Philadelphia ===
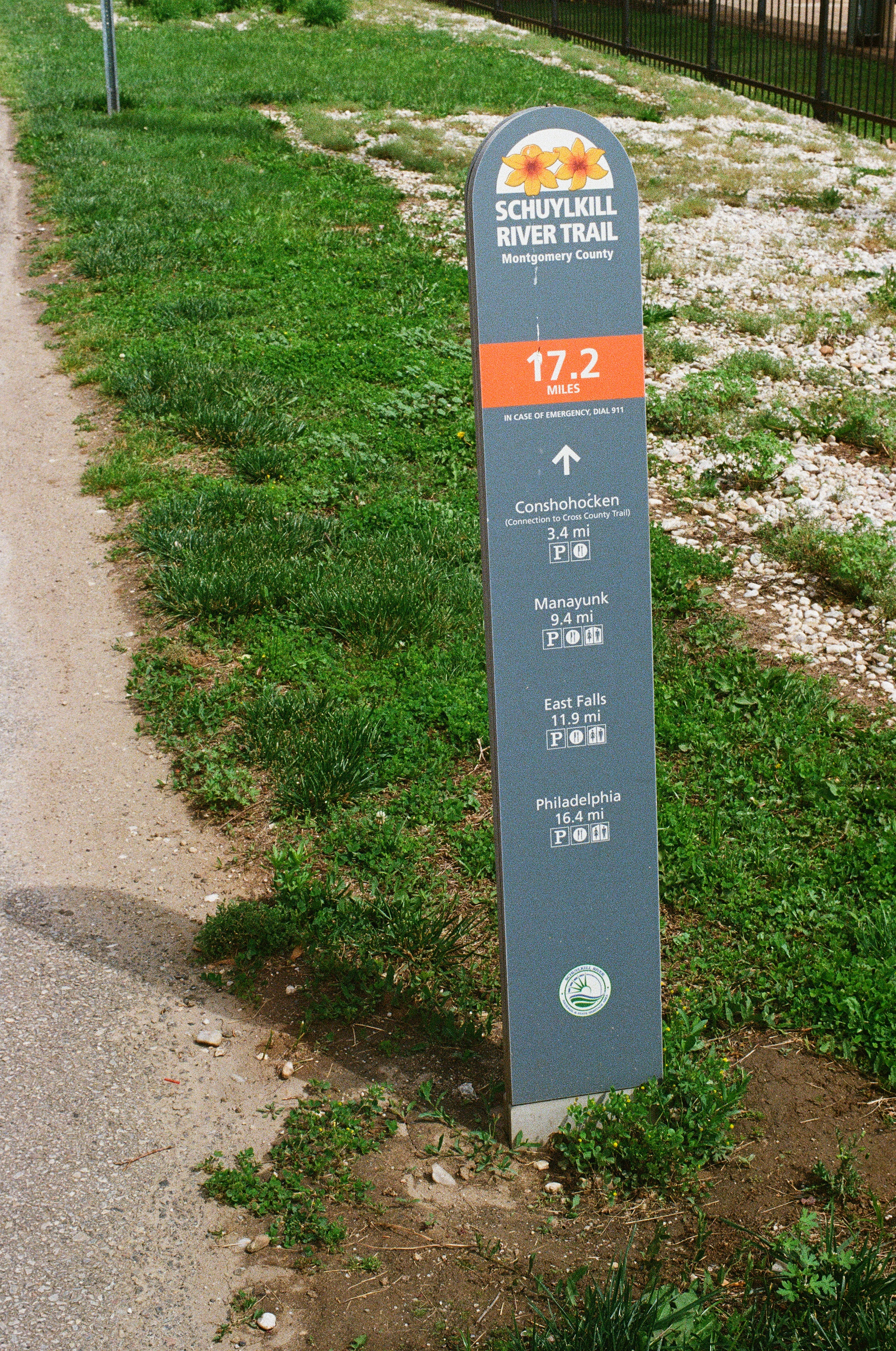
The trail marker outside the Norristown Transit Center

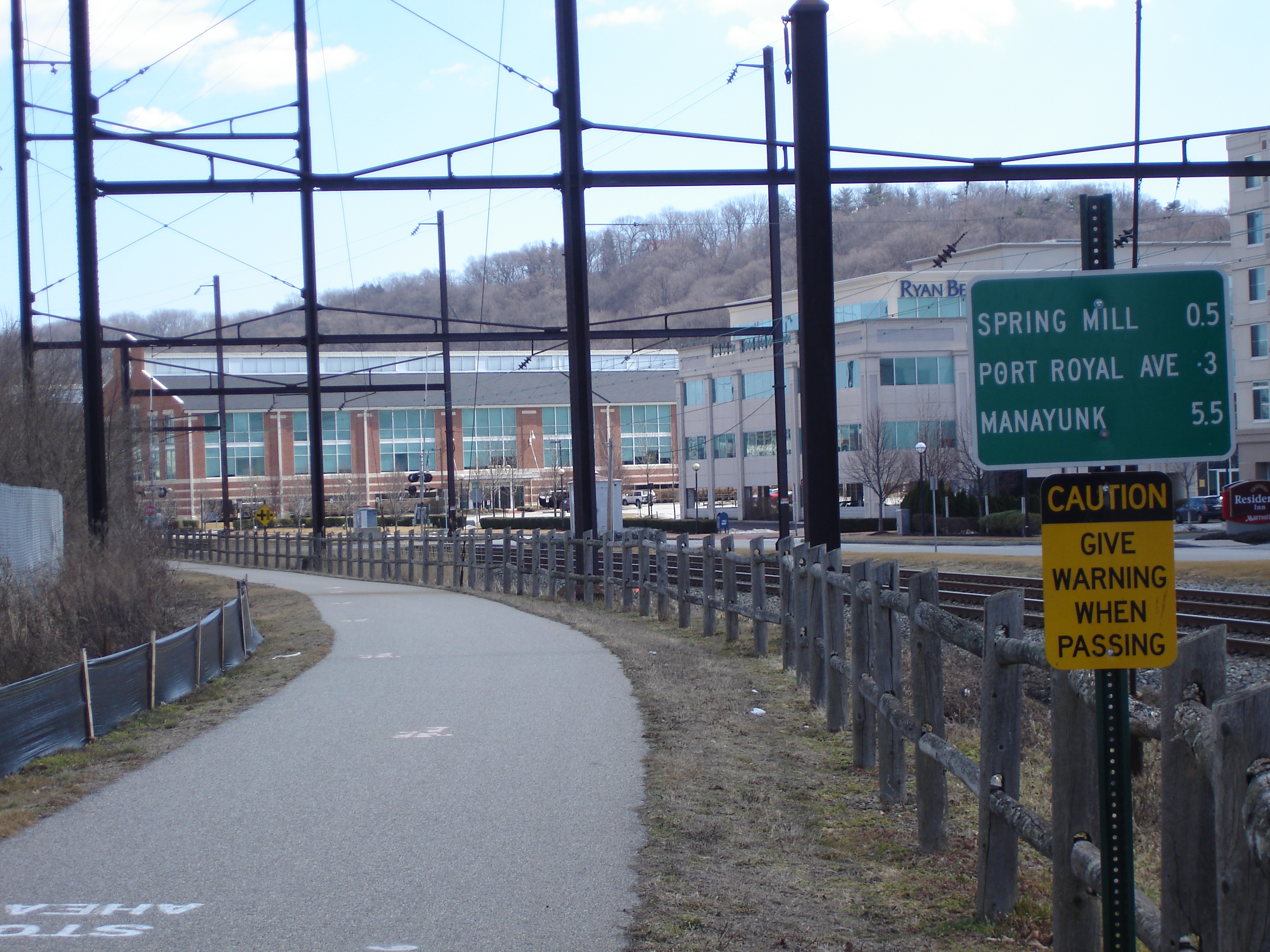
The trail through downtown Conshohocken

The next segment of the trail begins in Oaks at the southern end of the Perkiomen Trail and a trailhead at Pawlings Road. This paved segment runs along the abandoned trackbed of the former Schuylkill Branch of the Pennsylvania Railroad. It runs beside U.S. Route 422 for a short distance, then runs through Valley Forge National Historical Park. After leaving the park at Betzwood, it continues along the river to Norristown, where it crosses over U.S. Route 202 and runs through the middle of the Norristown Transportation Center.

The trail continues eastwards, now parallel to the SEPTA Manayunk/Norristown rail line. On entering Conshohocken, it passes through industrial areas, under Interstate 476, and intersects the local Cross County Trail.

=== Philadelphia ===
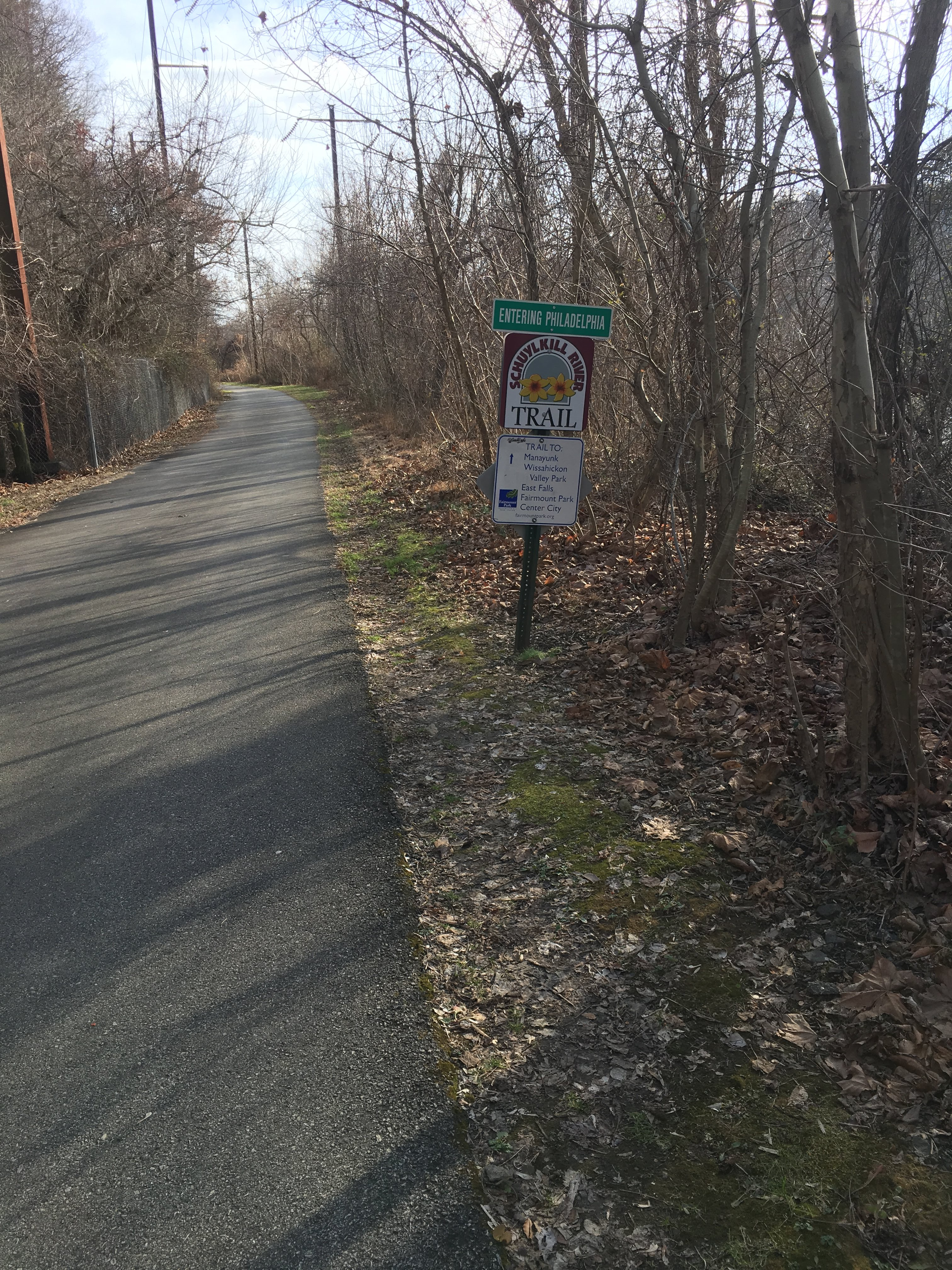
Trail entering Philadelphia

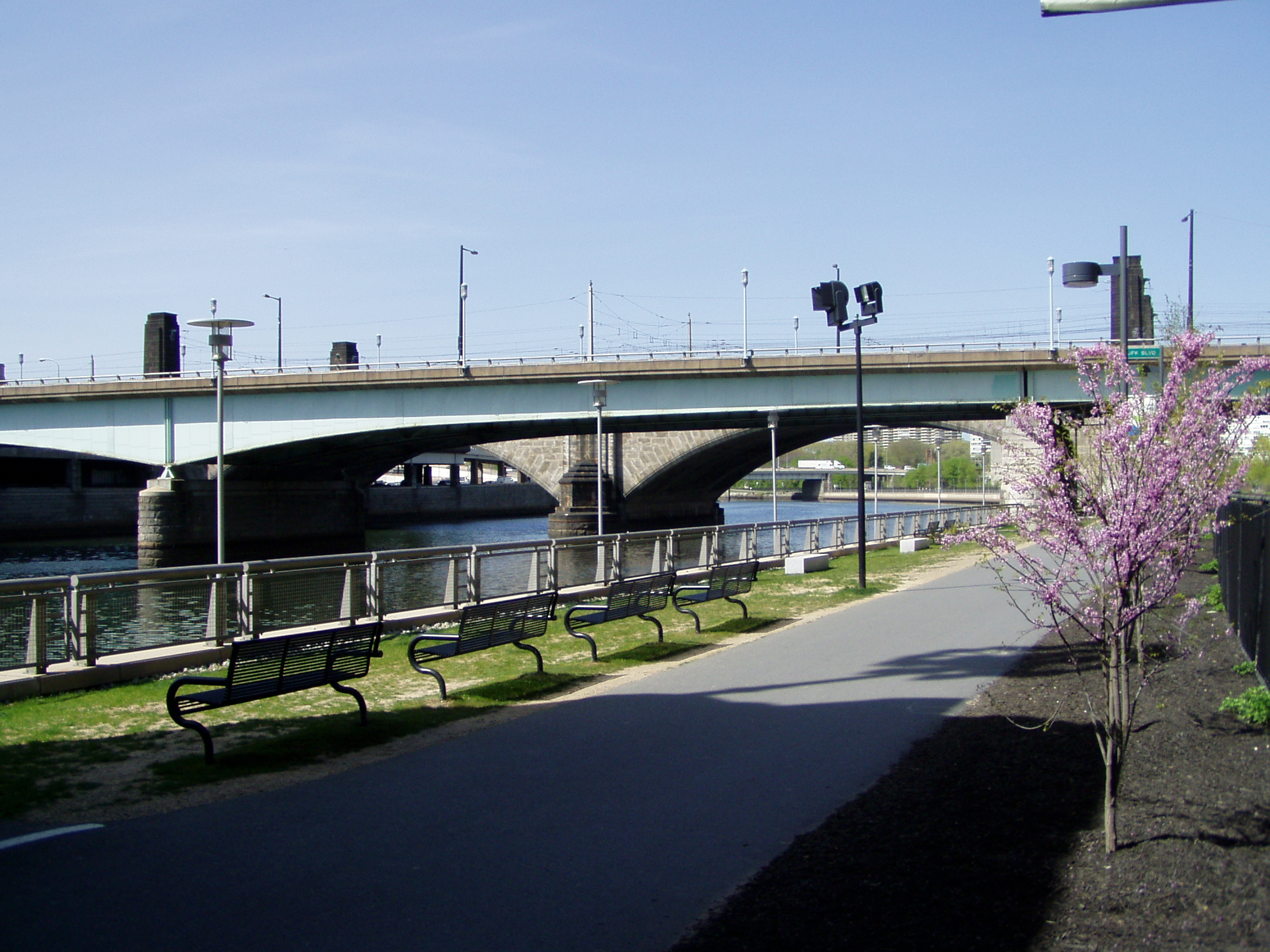
The Schuylkill River Trail in Schuylkill Banks park, Philadelphia

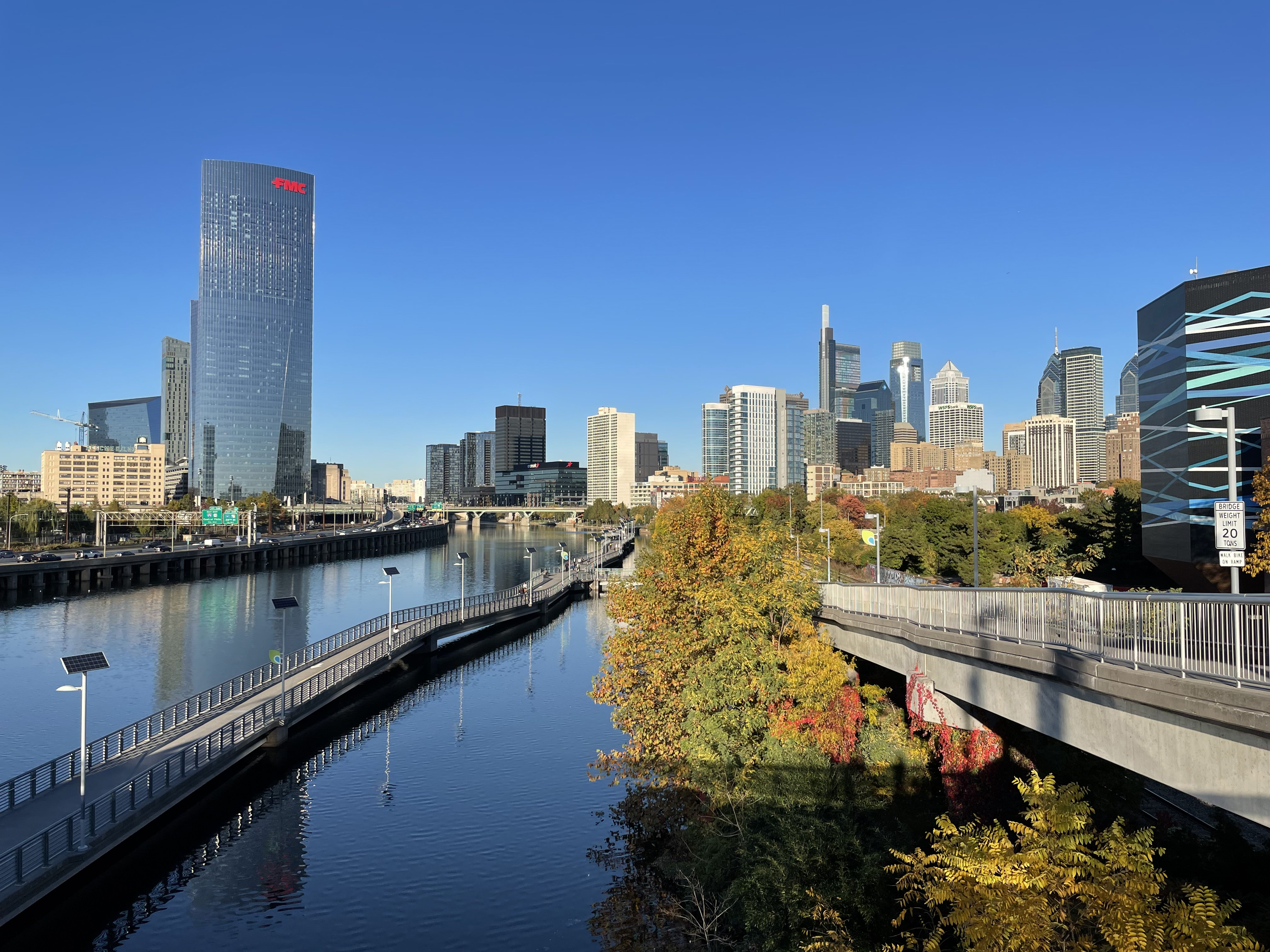
The boardwalk over the river in Schuylkill Banks park

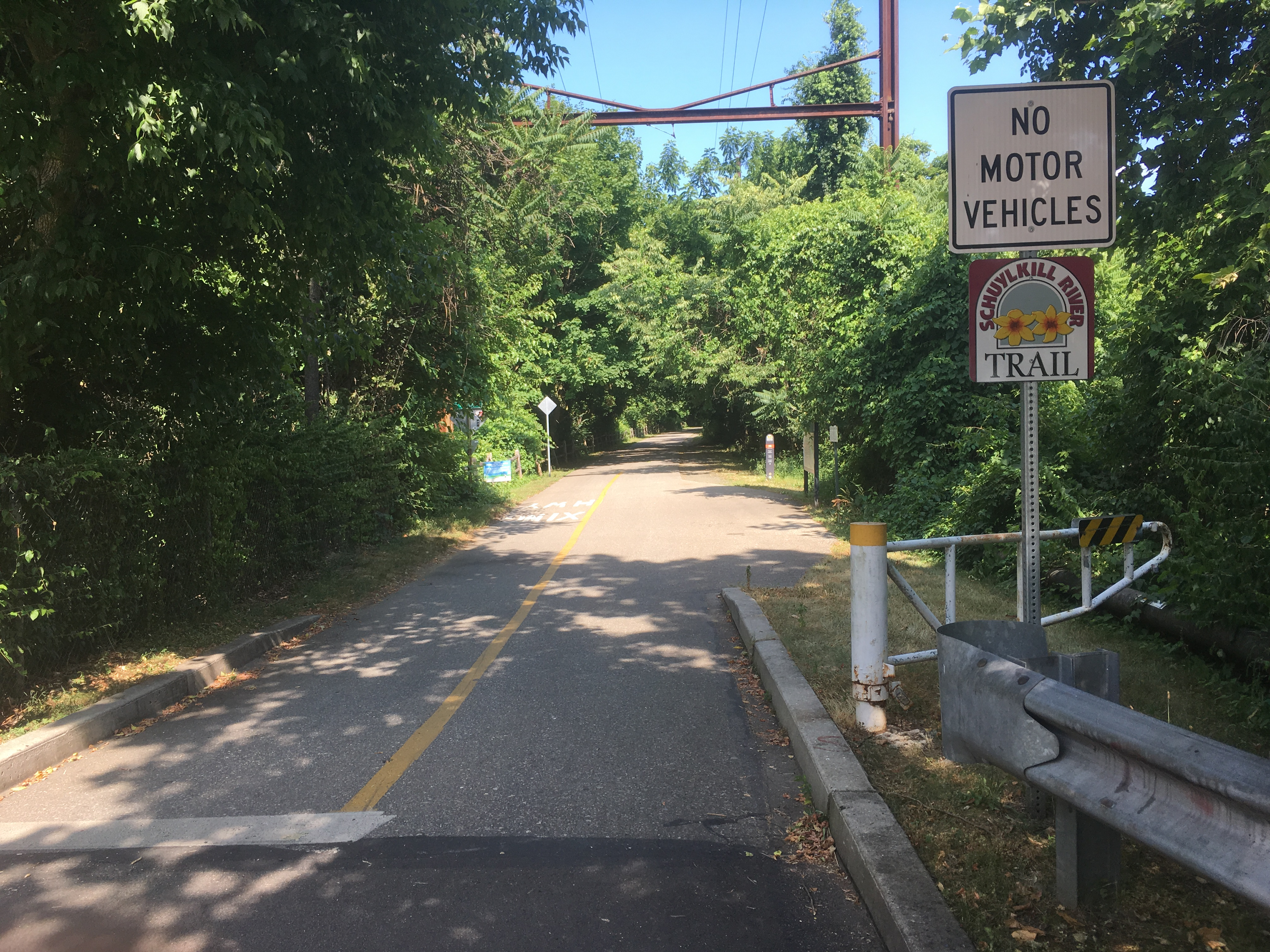
Schuylkill River Trail eastbound at Spring Mill

Shortly after crossing into Philadelphia, trail traffic is briefly directed onto Nixon and Shawmont Streets, crossing the SEPTA Manayunk/Norristown Line's tracks at the decommissioned Shawmont station.

The trail continues southeastward, unpaved, along the former Manayunk Canal Towpath of the Schuylkill Navigation System, passing through the neighborhood of Manayunk to the end of the towpath at Lock Street. Trail traffic is then directed onto the street or sidewalks of Main Street and Ridge Avenue toward Fairmount Park, where the trail meets the southern end of the Wissahickon Trail. Trail traffic continues on the road or sidewalk over the historic Ridge Avenue Bridge (NRHP) crossing the Wissahickon Creek, and turning right onto the paved multi-use trail beside Kelly Drive through east Fairmount Park.

The trail then winds along the east bank of the Schuylkill River through the park, first passing by the Falls Bridge, then passing under many railroad and highway bridges, past several monuments and Laurel Hill Cemetery. It runs beside the Ellen Phillips Samuel Memorial and Boathouse Row before following the Azalea Garden behind the Philadelphia Museum of Art and next to the Fairmount Water Works. After passing under the Spring Garden Street Bridge and West River Drive Bridge, the trail runs along the riverbank on the west edge of Center City as a waterfront park named Schuylkill Banks. At Locust Street, the trail splits: a bridge carries the trail over CSX-owned railroad tracks to terminate in Schuylkill River Park. A 2,000 ft (610 m) boardwalk, opened in 2014, extends over the river and continues to South Street, ending at the south side of the South Street Bridge. The bridge deck is reached by a ramp to the north side of the bridge or by a staircase with a bike trough up to the south side of the bridge.

On May 20, 2009, as one of its last acts, the Fairmount Park Commission approved the acquisition of 12 acres (49,000 m^{2}) of land along the Schuylkill River to extend the river trail. From South Street to Christian Street, the trail continues over land owned by Children's Hospital of Philadelphia, which announced plans to host the trail in 2013. In 2016, Philadelphia Councilman Kenyatta Johnson introduced legislation to acquire a small parcel of land from CSX Transportation so the trail's extension could be built. The South to Christian section had opened by February 1, 2018, and was dedicated on April 20 of that year.

The Christian to Crescent Trail Connector bridge forms part of the trail segment connecting Christian Street along the eastern bank of the river to the trail in Grays Ferry Crescent (a park along the Grays Ferry river bend). The segment (including the cable-stayed bridge) was designed by AECOM, built by PKF-Mark III, and overseen by the Streets Department and PennDOT. It is owned by the City of Philadelphia and maintained by Philadelphia Parks and Recreation and SRDC. The $48 million project received one-quarter of its funds from the U.S. Department of Transportation in March 2018. Construction began in 2020, and the bridge opened on May 17, 2025.

From Grays Ferry Crescent, the trail crosses the river on the 415-foot Schuylkill Crossing Swing Bridge. The bridge was built in 1902 as a railroad bridge with a swing span to enable maritime traffic to pass. More than a century later, its original truss was replaced with a lighter one suitable for trail use. Opened in November 2026, the rebuilt bridge connects the SRT to the Kingsessing neighborhood and Bartram's Mile, a park that stretches southward to Bartram's Garden on the river's western bank.

In early 2025, the U.S. government granted more than $13 million through the Infrastructure Investment and Jobs Act for two projects to extend the Schuylkill River Trail: $7.2 million for the Wissahickon Gateway Trail, a bridge and path measuring 2,000 feet (610 m) to fill a gap near the Wissahickon Transportation Center; and $6.1 million to build the Passyunk Connection, a 4,500-foot (1,400 m) path to fill a gap in the trail between Bartram's and 61st Street. Also in early 2025, Schuylkill River Greenways released a mobile app to help people navigate the trail.

== History ==
Many current and proposed sections of the Schuylkill River Trail, including the Thun Trail and the Oaks to Philadelphia portion, are rail trails, following the right-of-way of the former Schuylkill Branch of the Pennsylvania Railroad. Live catenary wires are still in place above the trail between Norristown and Philadelphia. These are part of Amtrak's 25 Hz traction power system, and supply power for both the Philadelphia to Harrisburg Main Line and Northeast Corridor. The Shawmont-to-Manayunk portion of the trail runs along the towpath of the historic Schuylkill Canal (Schuylkill Navigation System).

== See also ==
- List of crossings of the Schuylkill River
- List of parks in Philadelphia
- Fairmount Park
- Delaware River Trail
