= Philadelphia Water Department =

Public water utility

Philadelphia Water Department or Philadelphia Water
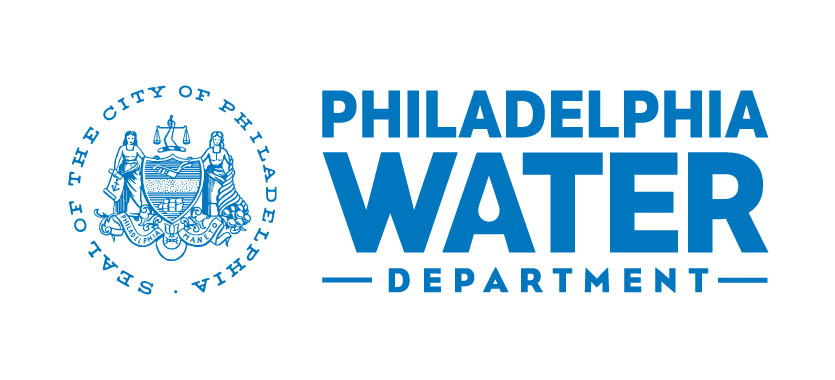
- Philadelphia Water Department logo, November 2016–present

Utility overview
- Formed: 1801
- Jurisdiction: City of Philadelphia, Pennsylvania
- Headquarters: Jefferson Tower 1101 Market Street, Fl 5 Philadelphia, PA 19107; 39° 57′ 7.56″ N, 75° 9′ 30.6″ W39.9521, −75.1585
- Employees: 2,000
- Annual budget: $607,576,000, FY ending 2008-06-31, actual
- Utility executive: Benjamin C. Jewell, Water Commissioner
- Website: phila.gov/water

The Philadelphia Water Department is the public water utility for the City of Philadelphia. PWD provides integrated potable water, wastewater, and stormwater services for Philadelphia and some communities in Bucks, Delaware and Montgomery counties. PWD is a municipal agency of the City of Philadelphia, and is seated in rented space at the Jefferson Tower in the Market East area of Center City, Philadelphia.

The primary mission of the department is the planning, operation and maintenance of both the physical infrastructure and the organized personnel needed to provide high quality drinking water, and to provide an adequate and reliable water supply for all domestic, commercial, and industrial requirements, and to manage wastewater and stormwater to protect and improve the quality of the region's watersheds, especially the Delaware River and the Schuylkill River.

The department is responsible for delivering safe drinking water to more than 1.7 million people in Philadelphia and Lower Bucks County. It is also committed to protecting and bolstering the health and vitality of the region's waterways. It faces many challenges in meeting the goal of providing safe drinking water, including agricultural, mining, and drilling runoff, chemicals and fuel spilled on streets, radionuclides, and the treated wastewater from the region's inhabitants.

== History ==
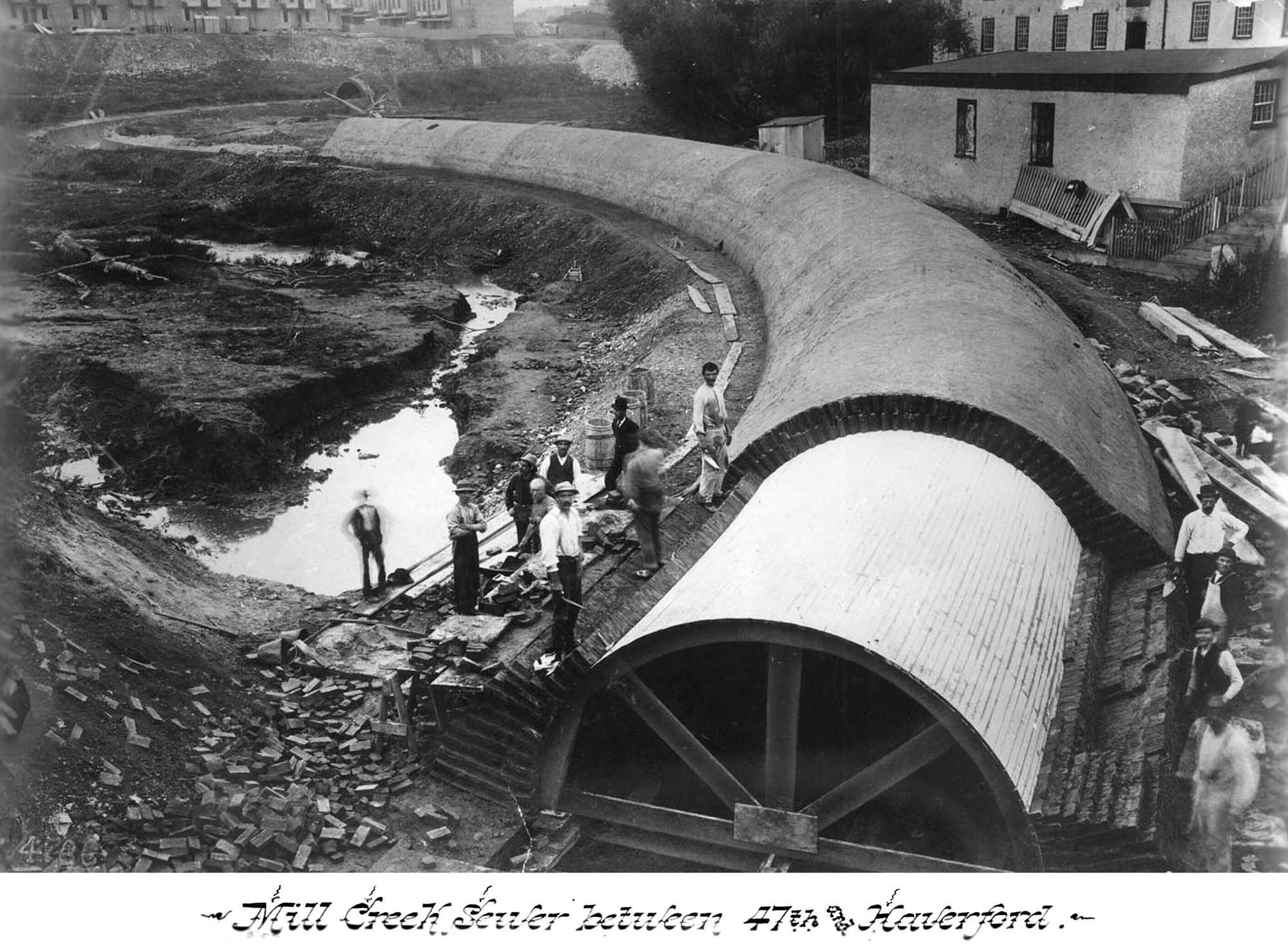
Construction of the Mill Creek Sewer in West Philadelphia, ca. 1883

The Philadelphia Water Department has been providing water to citizens since 1801, when, in the aftermath of a series of devastating yellow fever epidemics that killed thousands of people, the City decided a source of water was needed to cleanse the streets, fight fires, and perform household chores. While a number of private water companies had been established in other cities by that time, Philadelphia, with its city-owned and financed system, was one of the first in the U.S. to take on water supply as a municipal responsibility. Water was piped throughout the city, with paying customers served by direct lines to businesses and houses, and free water provided through public hydrants to anyone with a bucket to carry it in.

The city's first system, with a steam engine at Centre Square (the current location of City Hall) and a second engine at the foot of Chestnut Street, drew water from the Schuylkill River. This system was plagued by high costs and technical problems, mostly related to the unreliability of the steam engines. In 1815, a new works at Fairmount was opened. Steam engines pumped water up to reservoirs on top of the hill (which was the largest hill close to the city, and the current location of the Philadelphia Museum of Art).

While the steam engines at the Fairmount Water Works were better-designed than those at Centre Square, they were still balky and costly to run, leading to a plan to use water power to pump water into the reservoirs. This was accomplished in 1821, when a dam was completed across the Schuylkill River at Fairmount. The dam diverted water to run water wheels to operate the pumps, resulting in a vast improvement in cost and efficiency over steam powered pumping, which was abandoned at Fairmount. Water-powered Jonval turbines were added to Fairmount between 1851 and 1871. By this time, several other pumping steam-powered stations were operating to serve various parts of the city, drawing water from the Schuylkill River, Delaware River, Monoshone Creek (serving the Germantown Water Works) and springs (supplying the Chestnut Hill Water Works).

After the works at Fairmount were decommissioned in 1911, the buildings were retrofitted to house first an aquarium, and later a swimming pool. The restored complex, listed on the National Historic Register, now houses the educational and historical exhibits of the Fairmount Water Works Interpretive Center of the Philadelphia Water Department. The entire site, which also includes a restaurant and a restored historic landscape, is now part of Fairmount Park, and is administered by Philadelphia Parks & Recreation.

The city and state passed various anti-pollution laws- beginning in 1828, and the city's purchase of land that became Fairmount Park was an attempt to protect the Schuylkill River watershed from pollution while creating a grand new park. Unfortunately, these and other attempts to prevent pollution of the rivers failed, and both the Delaware and Schuylkill became badly polluted. Combined sewers, carrying stormwater and sewage in the same pipe, emptied directly into the city's rivers and streams, and dumping of industrial wastes also went largely unchecked. As a result, waterborne diseases, in particular typhoid fever, killed tens of thousands and sickened hundreds of thousands in the period between the Civil War and the beginning of the 20th century.

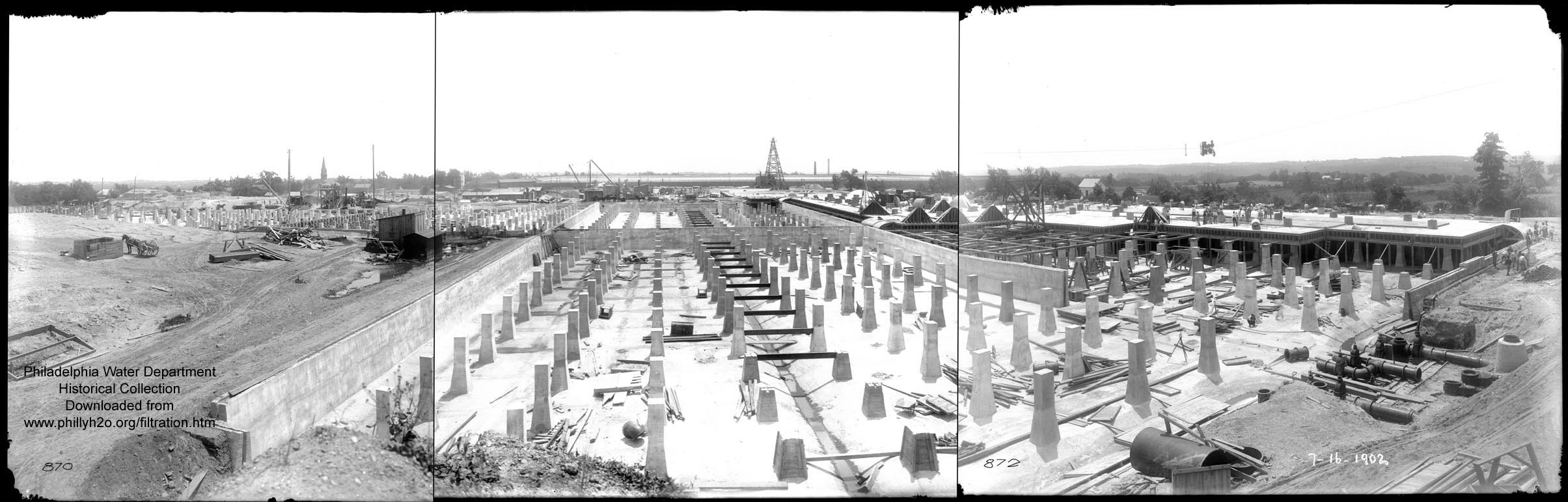
Construction of sand filters for drinking water treatment in 1902

To alleviate this public health disaster, five slow sand water filtration plants were constructed by the city between 1901 and 1912. Filtration, combined with chlorination of the water supply beginning in 1914, resulted in a dramatic decrease in the incidence of water-borne diseases. The Torresdale Filter Plant (now the Samuel S. Baxter Water Treatment Plant) and the Lardner's Point Pumping Station, which delivered filtered water into the city's vast network of distribution pipes, were both the largest of their kinds in the world at that time.

Between the 1920s and 1940s, the coal-powered steam engines that pumped water in all plants except Fairmount were replaced by electric pumps. Between the late 1940s and the early 1960s, slow sand filters were replaced by more efficient rapid sand filters.

Three water treatment plants – Baxter, in Northeast Philadelphia; Queen Lane, in East Falls; and Belmont, in West Philadelphia – now supply the city and surrounding suburban communities with water.

== Watersheds ==
Philadelphia is in the Delaware River watershed. The entire watershed drains roughly 14,119 square miles between five states – Delaware, Maryland, New Jersey, New York, and Pennsylvania. The total area that this watershed makes up is approximately 0.4% of the United States' land mass and is home to about 4.17 million people.

The city can be divided into seven main subwatersheds, all of which drain to the Delaware River: the Schuylkill, Wissahickon, Darby-Cobbs, Pennypack, Tacony-Frankford, Poquessing and the Delaware Direct. The Delaware Direct subwatershed itself is very small although all the others drain into it.

=== Darby-Cobbs ===
The Darby-Cobbs watershed drains approximately 77 square miles, and about 66% of its surfaces are classified as impervious. This watershed encompasses parts of Chester, Delaware, Montgomery, and Philadelphia counties. In specific, it is made up of the following municipalities: Easttown, Tredyffrin, Aldan, Clifton Heights, Collingdale, Colwyn, Darby, East Lansdowne, Folcroft, Glenolden, Haverford, Lansdowne, Marple, Millbourne, Morton, Newtown, Norwood, Prospect Park, Radnor, Ridley Park, Ridley, Rutledge, Sharon Hill, Springfield, Tinicum, Upper Darby, Yeadon, Lower Merion, and Narberth.

=== Delaware Direct ===
The contribution of direct drainage to the Delaware River from Philadelphia itself is very small, spanning only about 40 square miles of the city. The area directly considered the Delaware watershed is estimated to be 72% impervious surfaces within Philadelphia. The residences along the Delaware River drain into this watershed.

=== Pennypack ===
The Pennypack Watershed drains about 56 miles of Philadelphia and 33% of its surface area is impervious. Areas that belong to this water shed include parts of Montgomery, Philadelphia and Bucks counties, and segments of 12 different municipalities, including Abington, Bryn Athyn, Hatboro, Horsham, Lower Moreland, Rockledge, Upper Dublin, Upper Moreland, Upper Southampton, and Warminster.

=== Poquessing ===
This watershed drains about 22 square miles and 38% of its surface area is impervious. It includes areas of Philadelphia, Bucks, and Montgomery counties, and 4 additional municipalities called Lower Moreland, Bensalem, Lower Southampton, and Upper Southampton.

=== Schuylkill ===
This watershed is about 2,000 square miles and is 10% impervious. The Schuylkill watershed includes areas of 11 counties such as the Schuylkill, Berks, Montgomery, Chester, Philadelphia, Carbon, Lehigh, Lebanon, Lancaster, Bucks, and the Delaware.

=== Tookany/Tacony-Frankford ===
This watershed drains about 33 square miles and has about 48% impervious surface areas. Its reach includes parts of Philadelphia and Montgomery counties, as well as five municipalities: Abington, Cheltenham, Jenkintown, Rockledge, and Springfield.

=== Wissahickon ===
This watershed drains about 64 square miles and is 24% impervious. It includes areas of Montgomery and Philadelphia counties, as well as another 15 municipalities which include Abington, Ambler, Cheltenham, Horsham, Lansdale, Lower Gwynedd, Montgomery, North Wales, Springfield, Upper Dublin, Upper Gwynedd, Upper Moreland, Whitemarsh, Whitpain, and Worcester.

== Wastewater treatment and infrastructure ==
By 1899, approximately 800 miles of sanitary and storm sewers were in service in Philadelphia; today the system includes just under 3,000 miles of pipes. Most of these sewers emptied directly into the nearest river or stream, resulting in massive pollution of the waterways in and around the city. While water filtration made the polluted river water safe to drink, aquatic life in the rivers suffered greatly, and one swam in the rivers, or drank their raw water, at one's own peril.

A small primary wastewater treatment plant went into operation along Pennypack Creek in 1912, treating the sewage from several city-owned institutions to prevent it from floating upstream to the intake pipe at the Torresdale Water Treatment Plant. In 1914 the city, under state mandate, developed a comprehensive plan for the treatment and collection of sewage, with three treatment plants and hundreds of miles of large intercepting sewers to keep pollution out of rivers and streams.

In 1923, the Northeast Sewage Treatment Plant opened along the Delaware River, but implementation of the rest of the comprehensive system was delayed by the onset of the Depression and World War II. Construction began again in the late 1940s, with the Southeast and Southwest plants opening by the mid-1950s. By the 1980s another massive investment upgraded all three plants to secondary treatment. The design-rated capacity of all three wastewater treatment plants is 522 million gallons a day, with a maximum capacity of 1.044 billion gallons a day. Besides the city's own wastes, the Philadelphia system also treats the sewage of several adjacent communities.

=== Wastewater treatment ===
The Philadelphia sewer system has nearly 3,000 miles of sewers. Wastewater travels along some part of that system to one of three water pollution control plants: Southwest, Southeast and Northeast Water Pollution Control Plants. In these facilities, a combined average of 471 million gallons of wastewater is cleaned and discharged into the Delaware River every day.

== Drinking water treatment ==
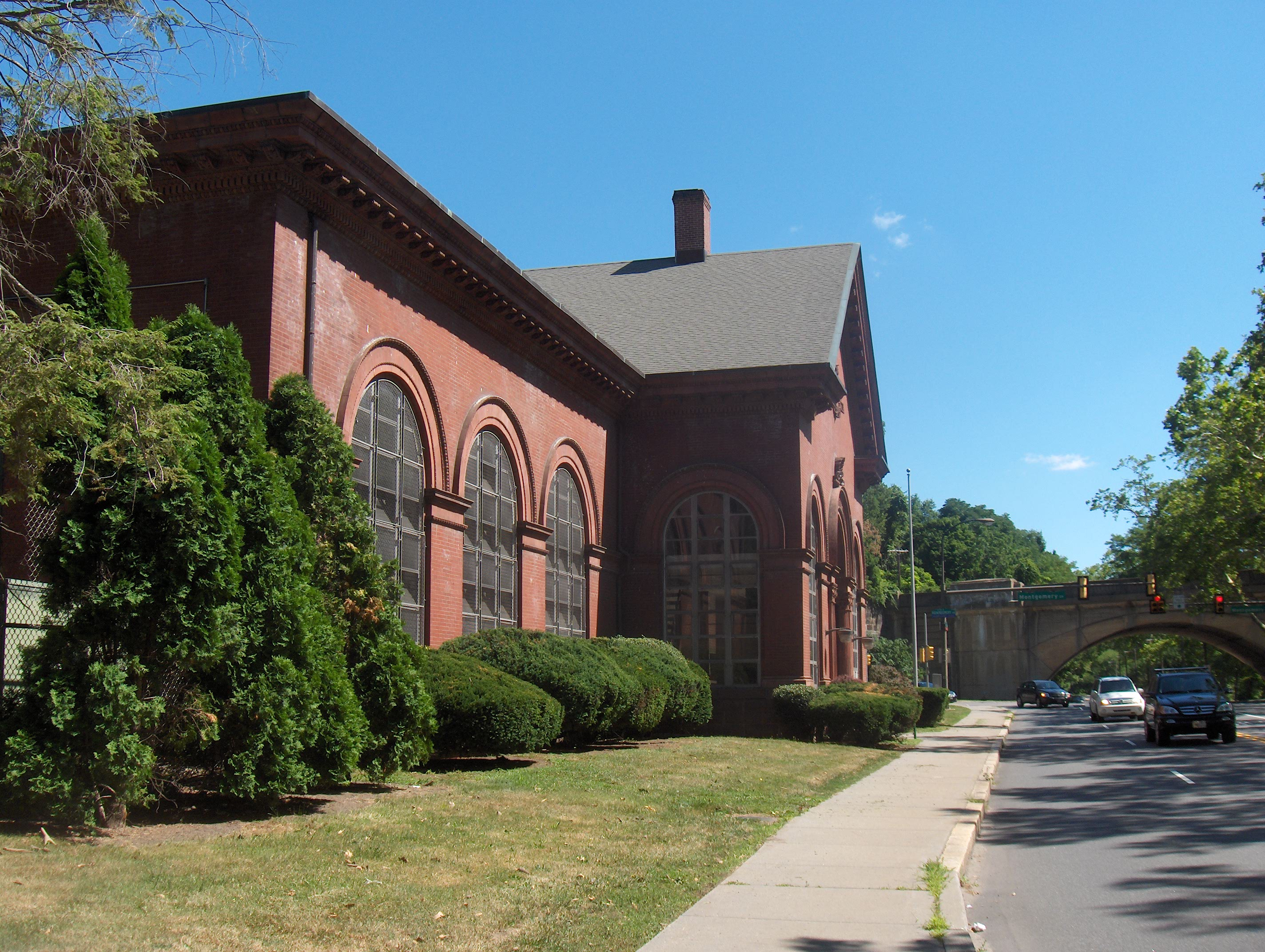
Philadelphia Water Department Belmont Pumping Station, built 1900, Martin Luther King, Jr., Drive at Montgomery Drive, Philadelphia, PA. View from the parking lot, looking north, with the Columbia Railroad Bridge in the background.

Philadelphia has three drinking water treatment plants — Samuel S. Baxter on the Delaware River and Queen Lane and Belmont on the Schuylkill.

The Fairmount Dam prevents brackish water from the Delaware River from coming up the Schuylkill from the Delaware with the tide. The Safe Drinking Water Act sets primary and secondary standards for drinking water. Each Philadelphian uses an average of 80 to 100 gallons of water per day; the city's three modern water treatment plants have a combined, design-rated capacity to treat 540 million gallons of water per day. While there is some variation among the plants, the drinking water treatment process occurs through a number of steps.

== Operations ==
Untreated water enters Philadelphia Water's system through the Schuylkill and Delaware rivers. Before untreated water reaches the city limits, it has traveled as much as 330 miles past farms, factories, businesses and residential areas, each of which contributes its own pollutants to the rivers. That is why the department has to treat the water before it is safe to drink.

The Philadelphia Water Department (PWD) has three main responsibilities. The first is to treat the raw water drawn from the Schuylkill and Delaware Rivers so that it is safe for drinking, and deliver it to customers. The second is to collect and treat wastewater (i.e., sewage) that flows into the sewer system. Philadelphia Water must treat this used water coming from homes, businesses and factories, as well as rainwater, so that it is clean enough to return to the Delaware River. The department is also responsible for collecting, storing and managing stormwater in order to keep excess stormwater from overflowing into the wastewater treatment system. The third is to collect and recycle biosolids into clean, beneficial soil-like compost. Biosolids are the solid materials left over from the wastewater treatment process, including plant material, human waste, food put down the garbage disposal and detergents. The Biosolids Recycling Center cleans, treats and transforms these materials into a nutrient-rich compost.

== Source Water Protection Program ==
The Source Water Protection Program includes partnerships that traverse city boundaries. Philadelphia Water began this program in 1999 when the Office of Watersheds was created. The Delaware and Schuylkill rivers each make up about half of the Philadelphia area's drinking water supply, and Philadelphia Water delivers about 250 million gallons of this drinking water to customers on a daily basis through its treatment plants. This program implements the monitoring of these rivers' water quality conditions, major sources of contamination, and flow patterns. Philadelphia lists climate change, forest clearing and development, stormwater runoff, agricultural runoff, spills and accidents, treated wastewater effluent, pharmaceuticals, pollution from geese and wildlife, and improper disposal of waste and trash as the program's primary concerns related to maintaining high quality drinking water.

Despite being criticized for the low quality of its drinking water in 2011, the department has won numerous awards for its devotion to drinking water quality.

=== Delaware Valley Early Warning System ===
The Early Warning System was created in order to integrate real time water quality monitoring with the use of river gauges and water quality sensors that analyze and provide data to craft models that can project the downstream spread and estimated arrival of pollution caused by spills, accidents, and floods. This system assists experts in planning responses to pollution and sends notifications via telephone and email to alert safety officials when these spills have occurred. The warning system was created as a part of the Source Water Protection program. It runs from the Delaware Water Gap to Wilmington, Delaware, and sounds alarms when events such as spills or flooding occur.

In 2014, the system added a "tidal spill trajectory animation." This provides an enhanced analysis of tidal flow influences on pollution spills in the Delaware Valley, improving response planning.

Philadelphia Water received the 2015 Governor's Award for Environmental Excellence in Pennsylvania by the Pennsylvania Environmental Council (PEC) for the aforementioned "Delaware Valley Early Warning System – Tidal Spill Trajectory Tool." This award was given to the department for the innovation the system showed as well as the public safety benefits this customized web-based system presented, as it was specially made to safeguard water quality for millions of people in the greater Philadelphia area.

=== RainCheck ===
RainCheck is a program Philadelphia Water employs to help residents capture stormwater and prevent it from causing sewer overflows. The Pennsylvania Horticultural Society works in collaboration with the Philadelphia Water on this project. There are four different property tools available through this program that the department helps property owners install. Downspout planters allow property owners to add greenery to their homes and recycle their spout water. Rain barrels allow owners to collect gray water for other purposes. Masonry projects allow owners to replace their impermeable pavement with surfaces that allow stormwater to soak back into the ground. Finally, rain gardens form shallow depressions that are designed to absorb water that runs directly off of roofs, and can prevent hundreds of gallons of water per year from entering the city's sewer systems.

These projects are intended to help Philadelphians contribute to their city- by filtering stormwater runoff that would otherwise end up polluting streams and rivers.

=== Migratory fish passage restoration and monitoring ===
Philadelphia's waterways were historically home to spawning populations of American shad and several other species of anadromous fish. The American eel, a catadromous fish was also noted to traverse Philadelphia's waters. There are numerous native fish species within the Delaware Estuary and Philadelphia's freshwater tributaries. However, Philadelphia Water focuses a majority of its monitoring efforts on American shad.

The department pioneered the installation of the Fairmount Dam Fishway in the Schuylkill River in 2008. The fishway allows shad to migrate up the Schuylkill River to spawn and has led to more than 3,000 fish passing through the ladder, according to a report by the U.S. Army Corps of Engineers. A video recording system was installed in the passage to allow the department to keep track of the number of fish passing through.

In an established partnership with the Pennsylvania Fish and Boat Commission, Philadelphia Water tracks the progress of native migratory fish populations. Aquatic biologists utilize electrofishing equipment to estimate the number of fish in the rivers. They also collect anadromous fish and donate a few to biologists from the PFBC, who check the fish for hatchery tags that mark fish released from hatcheries and distinguish them from fish born in the wild. Having a ratio of hatchery-raised fish to natural fish allows the department to determine if the fish population is increasing of its own accord or because of hatcheries.

== Stormwater grants ==
The stormwater grants program launched in 2012, as a combined effort of Philadelphia Water and the Philadelphia Industrial Development Corporation (PIDC). The mission of the grants program is to reduce the price of installing green infrastructure for qualified non-residential Philadelphia Water customers and contractors and encourage the installation of stormwater management practices that reduce stormwater's entrance into city sewers and surrounding waterways. The two types of programs offered are Stormwater Management Incentives Program (SMIP) and the Greened Acre Retrofit Program (GARP).

== Stormwater Management Incentives Program ==
This grant program is designed for large, commercial properties with lots of impervious surfaces that create stormwater runoff in high volumes, burdening the city's sewer system. It provides them with funds to revamp their properties to better practice green stormwater management. The property owner or tenant with permission from the property owner must apply for this grant. The most competitive applications typically keep grant requests to $100,000 or less per impervious acre.

== Greened Acre Retrofit Program ==
This grant program Greened Acre Retrofit Program (GARP) provides funds that help to offset the cost of stormwater projects built by contractors across properties in Philadelphia's combined sewer area. GARP funding is typically awarded to companies or project aggregators with plans to build a stormwater management plan on properties in Philadelphia's combined sewer service area that hover around or above 10 acres in project size. The most competitive applications for these grants request around $90,000 or less per impervious acre.

== Water mains ==
The first water mains in Philadelphia were installed in the 1800s. Philadelphia Water currently maintains 3,200 miles of water mains that can be classified into three distinct sections of mains: transmission mains, distribution mains, and service mains.

Transmission mains are larger water mains that move vast amounts of water across Philadelphia between pump stations and reservoirs. They are typically more than 16 inches in diameter. Distribution mains, by comparison, are smaller than 16 inches in diameter and are used to carry water from transmission mains to customer service connections. Service connections are the individual connections owned by the property owner that connect to distribution mains and channel water into a building or house.

=== Water main breaks ===
A water main break happens when a hole or crack develops in a main and causes it to rupture. They typically result from the external corrosion of the pipe. The water typically finds its way to the surface due to the extreme amount of pressure the water is under. Millions of gallons of water can flow from a single break. In order to get the break under control, the water is shut off and the section of pipe that ruptured is replaced.

Philadelphia tracks the number of water main breaks that occur in 1,000 miles of main. The company uses a five-year moving average to smooth out the effect of weather variations. Based on historical information dating back to 1930, the average for 2001 was 212 breaks for every 1,000 miles of main– the lowest total over 45 years and better than the national average of 240–270 breaks per 1,000 miles.

== Green initiatives ==
Philadelphia Water Department developed some green initiatives, including "Biogas Cogeneration," "Green City, Clean Waters," and "Green Stormwater Infrastructure."

=== Biogas cogeneration ===
The technology for biogas cogeneration has been endorsed by the U.S. Environmental Protection Agency and allows for electricity and heat to be produced by the methane gas given off during sewage treatment.

In December 2011, in alignment with the city's Greenworks Philadelphia initiative, Philadelphia Water signed an agreement to incorporate biogas cogeneration into their Northeast Water Pollution Control Plant, as one of the first adopters in the nation of this system. The project cost $47.5 million and was financed by Bank of America, the company which technically owns the facility though the city is leasing it for 16 years.

In order to complete the project the city partnered with Ameresco Inc., a company based in Massachusetts that specializes in energy efficiency and infrastructure upgrades for North American facilities. The plant's renovations were completed in 2014.

Currently, the Northeast Water Pollution Control Plant is able to meet 85% of its electrical requirements for plant operations using biogas cogeneration. In this process, sludge digesters at the plant fuel the decomposition of organic materials to produce biogas by removing water vapor, hydrogen sulfide, and siloxane gas. The process captures more than 80 percent of all of the available energy for heat and electricity and ultimately results in about 43 million kWh of electricity per year.

The plant has been praised for its on-site production of electricity from waste, which allows for the avoidance of the electricity losses that would otherwise take place from transmission.

=== Green City, Clean Waters ===
Green City, Clean Waters is a 25-year plan to protect and enhance watersheds through stormwater management and green stormwater infrastructure (GSI). Philadelphia Water developed Green City, Clean Waters to confront environmental, demographic and financial challenges. Green City, Clean Waters confronts a number of challenges Philadelphia faces with aging infrastructure and the impact of climate change on human health but the program's driving factor is the reduction of combined sewer overflows (CSOs). By capturing and infiltrating stormwater using green stormwater infrastructure such as rain gardens, swales, and stormwater tree trenches the system works to mitigate flooding and erosion in Philadelphia's rivers and streams.

On October 21, 2014, the Green City, Clean Waters program was awarded the American Planning Association (APA) Pennsylvania Chapter's Planning excellence Award in Implementation. The following year on March 31, 2015, Green City, Clean Waters won the APA National Planning Excellence Award for Implementation. The award recognized the positive changes that have taken place in the city as a result of the program's planning efforts. Green City, Clean Waters completed 113 projects that implemented green stormwater infrastructure in the time leading up to this award and were in the process of designing 187 more.

Certain studies have shown that green infrastructure may significantly reduce crime in areas they are implemented over time. 'The Impact of Green Stormwater Infrastructure Installation on Surrounding Health and Safety' was published in the American Journal of Public Health in March 2015. The 12-year study showed a significant correlation between the drop in crime rates in certain areas and the implementation of green stormwater infrastructure.

=== Green Stormwater Infrastructure (GSI) ===
One of the environmentally-friendly initiatives of Philadelphia Water is incorporating green stormwater infrastructure around the city as a part of its Green City, Clean Waters initiative.

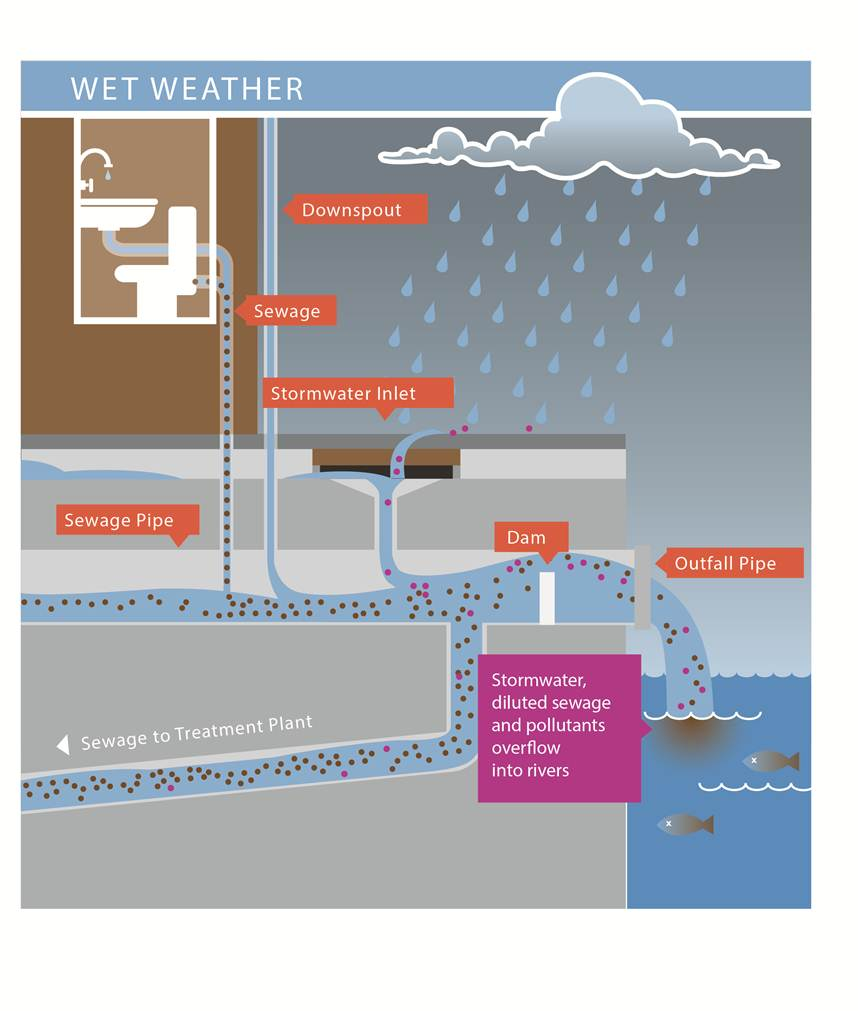
A picture summary of how CSO works

On April 12, 2012, the EPA joined the Mayor of Philadelphia, Mayor Michael Nutter, to announce a federal endorsement of Philadelphia Water's plan to use GSI toward its goal of becoming America's greenest city.

More than a hundred years ago, Philadelphia built its sewers so that sewage, stormwater runoff, and gray water would all flow underground into the same pipe. When a high level of water threatened the pipes' integrity, they structured these pipes to overflow into the Schuylkill and Delaware rivers in an event called a combined sewer overflow (CSO). In these circumstances, the sewage content in these pipes and pollution from the streets jeopardizes the cleanliness of these rivers. The department has been focusing on how to use green infrastructure that stores stormwater and releases it into the sewers gradually in order to minimize these events. Philadelphia Water aims to protect the watershed with Green Stormwater Infrastructure and create a more environmentally friendly city.

Green City, Clean Waters involves the installment of various soil-water-plant systems that will filter contaminants out of stormwater, returning some of it to the ground, releasing some to the air, and some slowly back into the sewer system. This process targets impervious city surfaces such as streets and the roofs of buildings. The increased land development leads to more impervious surfaces and causes an increase in stormwater runoff and consequently combined sewer overflows. CSOs endanger the quality of Philadelphia's watersheds because they result in the pollution of rivers and streams.

=== Energy efficiency ===
Another part of this initiative is to effectively utilize wastewater for energy and nutrients. A Philadelphia-based company called NovaThermal Energy partnered with Philadelphia Water on a project that warms a building with heat derived from sewage. This building is the Southeast Water Pollution Control Facility in Philadelphia. A sewage channel adjacent to the building transfers heat into a 1 million BTU/hour unit located in the building's basement. This geothermal system utilizes a water source heat pump complete with a filtration device to transfer heat energy from the sewage channels that are already in the ground, unlike costly geothermal wells which must be dug for a similar heating process.

== greenSTEM Network ==
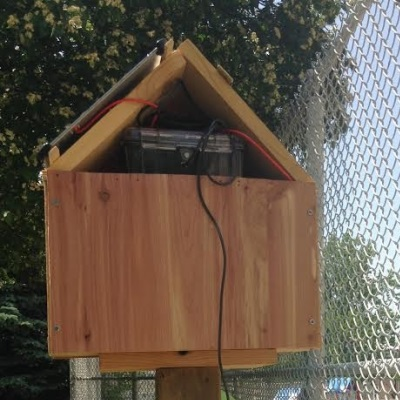
The circuit boards that collect the data go on the top floor in the birdhouse while the birds nest in the bottom.

The greenSTEM Network is an initiative by Philadelphia Water to integrate the study of the urban watershed into Philadelphia's public schools. Using low-cost technologies such as the Arduino microcontroller and the Raspberry Pi, greenSTEM allows students to monitor schoolyard gardens using web-connected sensors. The project began at TechCamp Philadelphia in 2013, a hackathon sponsored by the U.S. State Department and the School District of Philadelphia, as a collaboration between Philadelphia Water and civic hackers from Code for Philly.

In 2014, greenSTEM worked with students to design innovative soil-moisture monitoring systems for their school gardens called Root Kits. Students could view soil moisture data online at www.greenstemnetwork.org and determine when gardens needed to be watered.

In 2015, students helped build and develop solar-powered birdhouses. In addition to monitoring soil-moisture data, the birdhouses contain an infrared camera that captures live footage of the birds nesting inside. The program also incorporates student visits to the Fairmount Water Works, which provides educational support. Students from Science Leadership Academy's Beeber campus have engaged in programming Root Kits for other schools and built birdhouses to hold the soil-moisture sensors and cameras.

== Governance ==
- Benjamin C. Jewell, Water Commissioner
- Melissa LaBuda, Deputy Water Commissioner of Finance
- Gerald Leatherman, Deputy Water Commissioner of Administration and Human Resources
- Benjamin Jewell, Deputy Water Commissioner of Operations
- Glen Abrams Deputy Commissioner of Communications and Engagement
- Stephen J. Furtek, General Manager of Planning and Engineering
- Marc Cammarata, Deputy Water Commissioner of Planning & Environmental Services
- Ji Jun, General Counsel
- Damien Wright, Director of Innovation and Technology

== Statistics ==
General:

Employees: 1,836

Drinking water customers: approximately 1.7 million

Wastewater customers: approximately 2.2 million

Service areas:

Philadelphia water: 130 sq. mi.

Wholesale water: 101.35+ sq. mi.

Water treatment, storage and transmission:

Average daily treated water delivered: approximately 250 million gallons per day (MGD)

Total raw and treated water storage design capacity: 1,065.5 million Gallons (MG)

Combined rated treatment capacity of three plants: 546 MGD

Water infrastructure:

Total water system piping miles: 3,174

Main mileage replaced: 16.1

Total number of valves: 91,240

Total number of fire hydrants: 25,355

Wastewater treatment and infrastructure:

Average daily water sewage treatment: approximately 461 MGD

Total wastewater service area: Philadelphia 134 sq. mi., suburban area 230 sq. mi.

Total collector system piping: approximately 3,722 miles

Miles of sanitary sewers – separate: 762

Miles of stormwater conduits (sewers): 738

Miles of combined sewers: 1,856

Miles of force mains, inlets and vent pipes: 368

Number of wastewater pumping stations: 16

Number of stormwater pumping stations: 3

Number of stormwater inlets: 74,430

Sewers reconstructed: 6.6 miles

== See also ==
- Water supply and sanitation in the United States
