= Manayunk Canal Towpath =

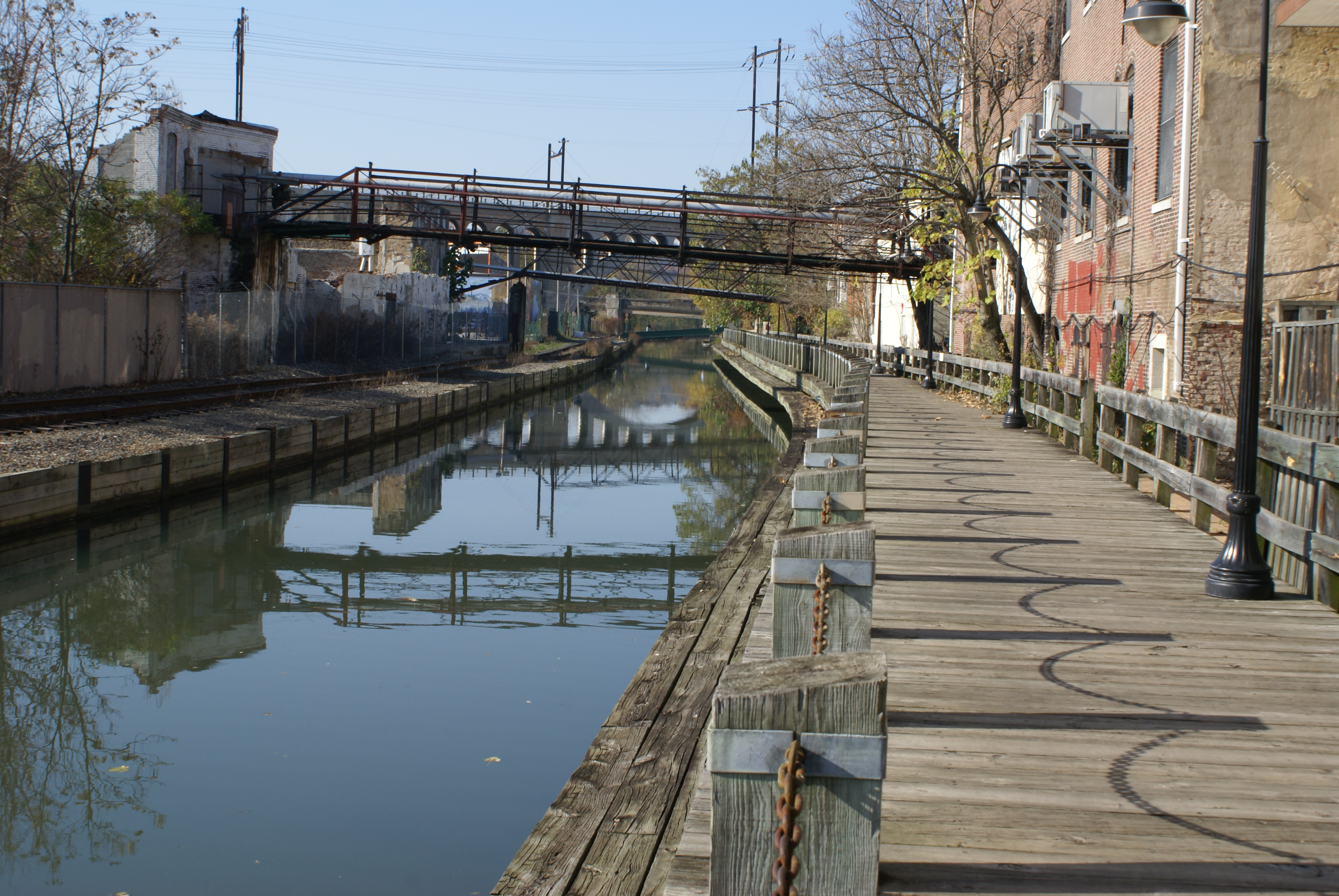
Manayunk Canal Towpath

The Manayunk Canal Towpath is a trail that runs along the Schuylkill River Canal in Manayunk, Pennsylvania, a northwest section of Philadelphia. The Towpath parallels the Manayunk Canal and the Schuylkill River. The canal was dug in 1819. The Towpath is accessible from Fairmount Park to the East and from the Schuylkill River Trail to the West. As the Towpath runs through heavy industry and rural-like settings, its surface varies between boardwalk, gravel, and pavement. This makes the Towpath ideal for running, walking, and cycling. Fishing in the Schuylkill Canal along the Manayunk Towpath is a favorite past time for visitors and residents alike. Visible along the Towpath are rail lines, old canal locks, ruins of the lock tender's house and old textile mills. Plentiful wildlife thrives along the Manayunk Canal Towpath including many species of birds, fish, turtles, and native plants. The Manayunk Development Corporation is currently organizing a full restoration of the Manayunk Canal; once the restoration is complete, it will be possible for canoes and small boats to sail through the Manayunk Canal Towpath as they make their way down the Schuylkill River.

https://hiddencityphila.org/2012/02/restoration-of-manayunk-canal/#:~:text=Opened%20nearly%20two%20hundred%20years,of%20railroads%20then%20being%20built.
