= Mont Clare Bridge =

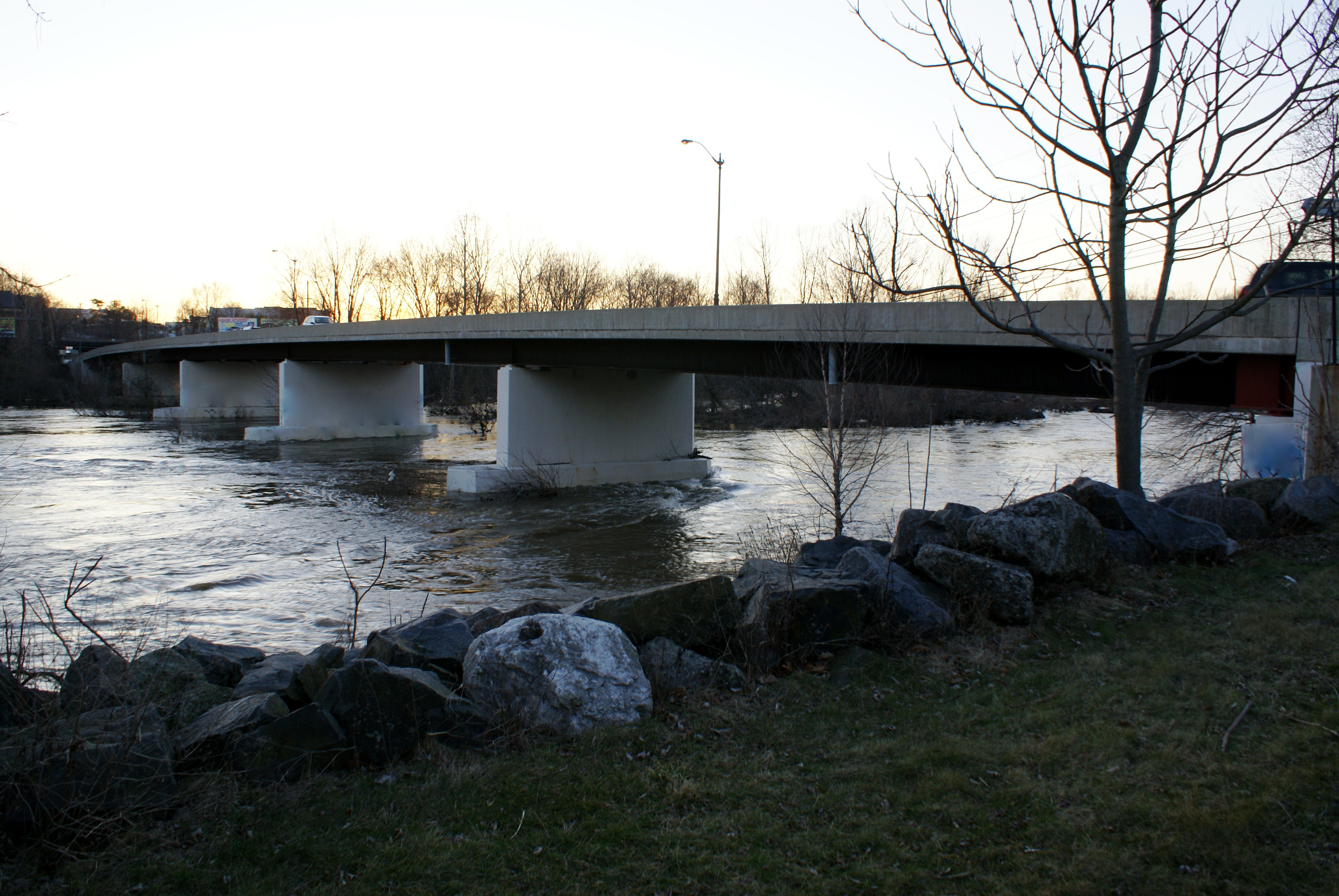
- 1997 Mont Clare Bridge at sunset
- Coordinates: 40°08′07.4″N 75°30′31.1″W
- Carries: Two lanes of PA 29 (Bridge Street)
- Crosses: Schuylkill River
- Locale: Southeastern Pennsylvania, USA
- Maintained by: Pennsylvania Department of Transportation
- ID number: 460029001000000

Characteristics
- Design: Stringer/Multi-beam or Girder
- Total length: 550 feet (170 m)
- Width: 38 feet (12 m)
- Longest span: 110 feet (34 m)

History
- Opened: 1997

Statistics
- Daily traffic: 18347 (in 1992); 15544 (in 2000); 16347 (in 2004); 16692 (in 2009)

Location
- Interactive map of Mont Clare Bridge

The Mont Clare Bridge (also Phoenixville–Mont Clare Bridge) is a crossing of the Schuylkill River between Mont Clare and Phoenixville in Pennsylvania, USA. The bridge was also referred to as the Intercounty Bridge, as it connects Montgomery and Chester counties. The bridge abuts a shorter county bridge across the Schuylkill Canal and towpath on the Mont Clare side to complete the crossing. The crossing carries Bridge Street (PA 29) and the Schuylkill River Trail.

== History ==
=== Ford ===
In early America, the crossing was a ford known originally as Indian or Indiantown Ford. Then successively as Gordon's, Starr's and Jacobs' Ford. The crossing gained some notoriety as Gordon's Ford when it was used by American and British troops during the American Revolutionary War. In the fall of 1777, British troops under Lord Cornwallis forced a passage at Gordon's Ford and at Fatland Ford, further downstream. In response, Washington maneuvered the Continental Army further west to protect his supply line and the Congress, then in York. This left Philadelphia lightly defended, leading to its capture. Gordon's Ford is mentioned in the writings of both Washington and Cornwallis.

=== 1844 bridge ===
In the winter of 1843–1844, local businessman Joseph Whitaker, while in the legislature, "obtained a charter for the incorporation of a company to erect a bridge over the Schuylkill at the site of th[e] ford". That summer, a wooden covered bridge was constructed, it was one of the longest in regional history. In early 1915, state highway engineers formally recommended to the County Commissioners that the bridge be replaced. Then fate took a hand and the covered bridge burned down on May 9, 1915. A temporary wooden replacement bridge was built on piles, just down stream from the previous, until the permanent replacement could be built.

=== 1916 bridge ===
1916 Mont Clare Bridge, c. 1921 PRR bridge in background

In December 1915, the County Commissioners of Montgomery and Chester Counties requested sealed bids for a five span, concrete arch bridge. In 1916 construction started on the new bridge, which was completed in April 1917. The 1916 bridge was designed by B. H. Davis and constructed by Ambler-Davis Co. Each of the five concrete arches spanned 103 feet (31 m), and the cost was US$103,250.

=== 1997 bridge ===
In 1996 a contract was let to replace the 1916 bridge. The new bridge was designed by HDR, Inc.'s Pittsburgh office and Czop/Specter, Inc. of Worcester, Montgomery County, PA office. Construction was done by Allan A. Myers Inc. of Worcester, Pennsylvania. Many design decisions were based on the requirement to keep the closure of State Route 29 to a minimum. The project was kept to a short time line by reusing the existing bridge foundations, using steel girders, and an incentive clause in the contract. The new bridge opened in 1997. The new bridge was the first in Pennsylvania to include "shock transmission units", an earthquake damage mitigation technology.

==== Schuylkill River Trail Connector ====
When Phoenixville opened their portion of the Schuylkill River Trail (SRT) in 2015, it still left a gap between SRT segments west of Phoenixville and the exiting SRT between Mont Clare and Philadelphia. The sidewalk and unmarked bike lane, of the 1997 bridge, unofficially filled that gap for walkers and cyclists. But the sidewalk and bike lane were not built to trail standards. They would be congested during peak trail usage and were not protected from vehicular traffic. In September, 2012, the counties and regional planners had issued a Request for Proposal to study improving the pedestrian and bicycle "Connector" on the bridge. Initial plans for the Connector were presented at an open house on June 12, 2013, and were met with favorable opinions.

In October 2019, construction started on the Connector. The sidewalk and bike lane were replaced with a level 10 foot wide trail segment and a concrete barrier was installed between the trail and the vehicle lanes. The original railing above the bridge edge was replaced with new railing. The new barrier was topped with the same railing on the Chester County half. The original December completion date was missed and then the project was further delayed by the COVID-19 pandemic. Although not completely finished, the Connector opened for use in the summer of 2020. As of September 2020, there was still a section of the new railing missing.

== See also ==
- List of crossings of the Schuylkill River
