= Jacob Ford =

Jacob Ford may refer to:

- Jacob Ford (American football)
- Jacob Ford (politician)
