= Sullivan's Bridge =

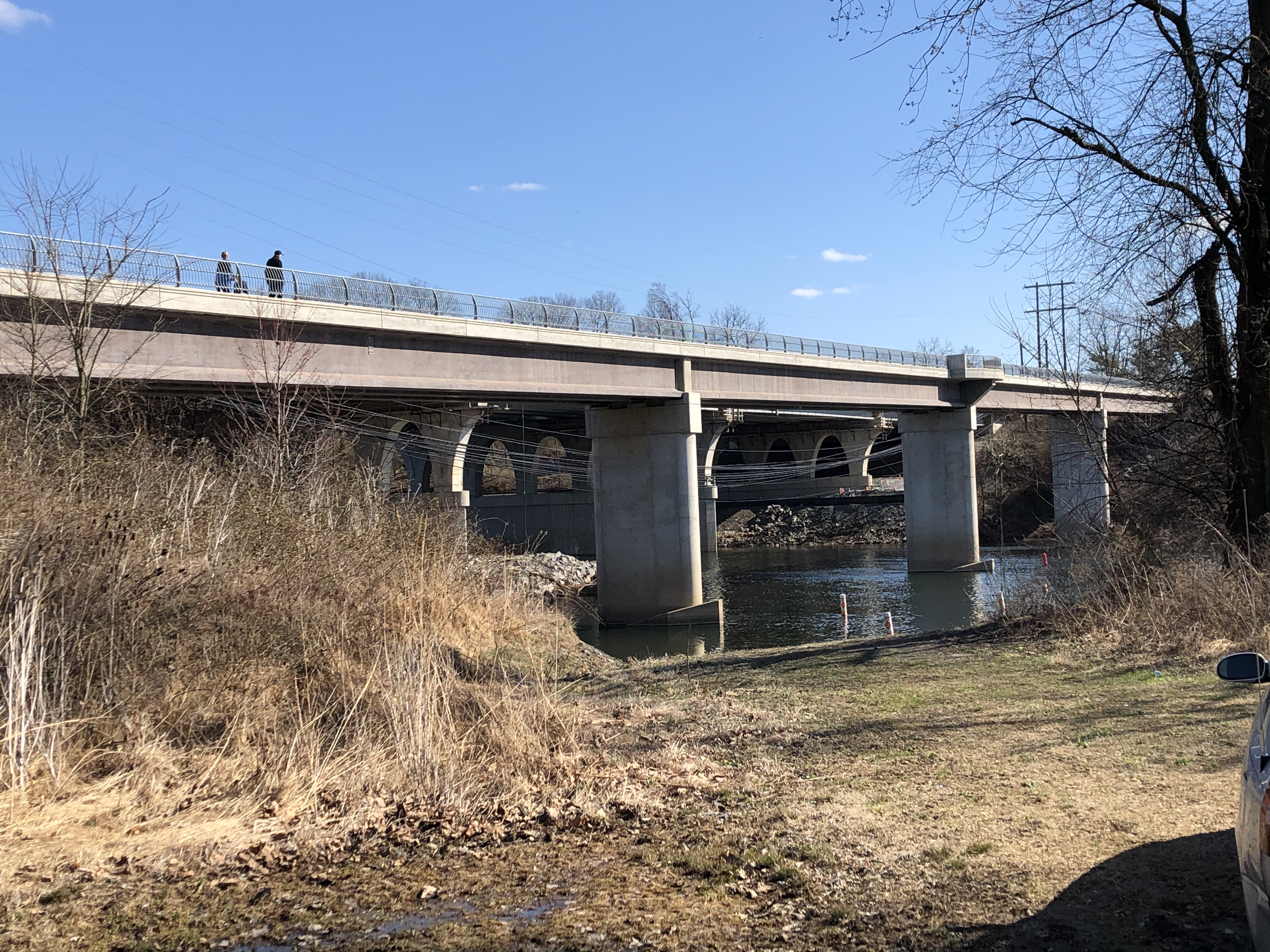
- Sullivan's Bridge
- Coordinates: 40°06′27″N 75°25′14″W
- Carries: Sullivan’s Trail
- Crosses: Schuylkill River
- Locale: Betzwood and Port Kennedy, Pennsylvania

Characteristics
- Material: Concrete

History
- Opened: August 19, 2016

Location
- Interactive map of Sullivan's Bridge

Sullivan's Bridge is a trail bridge that crosses the Schuylkill River and connects West Norriton Township with Upper Merion Township in Montgomery County, Pennsylvania. The bridge carries Sullivan's Trail, which connects the Schuylkill River Trail to Valley Forge National Historical Park. It opened in 2016, and runs parallel to an adjacent bridge crossing that carries the County Line Expressway (US 422).

== History ==
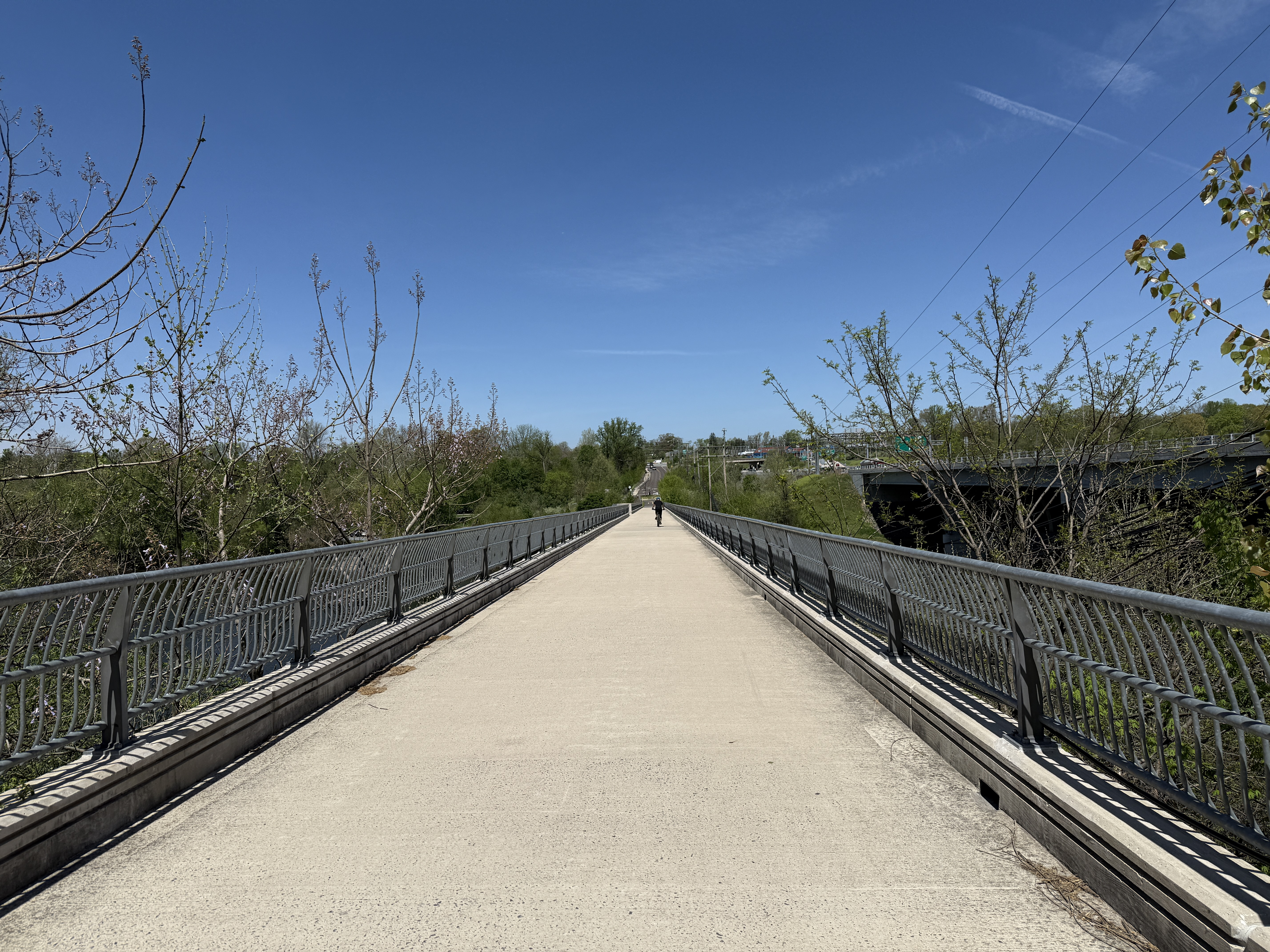
Sullivan's Bridge looking north along Sullivan's Trail

=== Former Betzwood Bridge ===
The Betzwood Bridge was a former truss bridge located on the site of the present-day Sullivan's Bridge. Constructed in 1900, the bridge connected the communities of Betzwood and Port Kennedy, carrying automobile, pedestrian, and cycling traffic. In 1928, PA 363 was designated onto the bridge, with the route connecting with PA 23 just south of the river crossing. In the 1960s, the County Line Expressway was constructed, and a four-lane automobile bridge carrying the highway was constructed adjacent to the bridge. The PA 363 designation was moved onto the new highway, through it would later be redesignated as US 422 in the 1980s

The bridge was closed in 1991 due to structural issues, and was demolished in 1995. While plans were being developed for a replacement of the bridge, all local traffic was forced to use the US 422 bridge as the only river crossing in the area. In order to accommodate for pedestrians and cyclists, a wooden walkway was built onto the US 422 bridge. The walkway was intended as a temporary solution, as it was only three feet wide and required cyclists to dismount and walk their bicycle across the bridge while crossing.

Plans ultimately failed to construct a new automobile bridge due to environmental concerns about the proximity of the bridge to Valley Forge Park. However, as congestion continued to grow on US 422, funding was secured by the National Park Service (NPS) and PennDOT to construct a new, $9.3 million bridge for pedestrians and cyclists only on the site of the old bridge. As part of a larger project in the area, the US 422 bridge would be reconstructed and expanded to include lanes for local traffic. Construction began on the new Sullivan's Bridge in 2014, and it opened to pedestrians and cyclists on August 19, 2016.

== Notable features ==
The concrete bridge is 604 feet long and 14 feet wide. Upon completion of the bridge, Sullivan's Trail was created to run from the Schuylkill River Trail near the north end of the bridge and connect to the trail system of Valley Forge Park near the south end of the bridge. Near its south end, the bridge crosses over a former Reading Company and SEPTA Regional Rail line, and the historic Port Kennedy station can be seen from the bridge.

The bridge and the trail running on the bridge are named in honor of General John Sullivan, who was charged by George Washington to build a bridge over the Schuylkill River around the time of the 1777–1778 winter encampment at Valley Forge.

== See also ==
- List of crossings of the Schuylkill River
