= Port Kennedy Bone Cave =

Cave in Pennsylvania, US

Coordinates: 40.10182°N 75.42462°W

- Interactive map of Port Kennedy Bone Cave
- Location: Valley Forge National Historic Park, Port Kennedy, Pennsylvania
- Depth: 50 ft (15 m)
- Discovery: c. 1894
- Geology: Potsdam Limestone
- Entrances: 1
- Hazards: buried
- Access: Restricted

The Port Kennedy Bone Cave is a limestone cave in the Port Kennedy section of Valley Forge National Historical Park, Pennsylvania, USA. The Bone Cave "contained one of the most important middle Pleistocene (Irvingtonian, approximately 750,000 years ago) fossil deposits in North America".

== History ==
The fossils in the cave were investigated by noted 19th-century paleontologists Edward Drinker Cope, Henry C. Mercer, and Charles M. Wheatley.

The cave was originally discovered by limestone miners in the 19th century. It was later filled in with asbestos-bearing industrial refuse and the cave's location was lost. The village of Port Kennedy was largely demolished in the 1960s during construction of the U.S. Route 422 Expressway. The tract containing the cave became part of the Valley Forge National Historical Park in 1978. In 2005, the National Park Service and geologists rediscovered the cave.

It has been rumored that the quarry near where the cave is located holds a crashed locomotive, which was used in the shooting of a now lost silent film in 1915, The Valley of Lost Hope.

== Remains found in the cave ==
Many fossils of prehistoric fauna are known from the site, including Ice Age taxa such as the saber-toothed cat, mastodon, short-faced bear, American cheetah, and Wheatley's ground sloth. Some extinct species are also exclusive to the site, many of them being described by Edward Drinker Cope during the late 19th century. In addition to the prehistoric animals, a myriad of early records of living mammals have been unearthed from the locale such as American black bears, North American river otters, and Gray foxes, giving more insight to their evolution. The age of the site falls within the Irvingtonian NALMA (North American Land Mammal Age), a period of terrestrial mammal evolution dating from 1.9 million to 250,000 BCE years ago. This accords with the global cooling and glaciation of the Lower to Middle Pleistocene, which preceded the final glacial age of the Upper Pleistocene in the Rancholabrean stage. Some of the species during the Irvingtonian present at Port Kennedy such as the saber-toothed cat and short-faced bear came from smaller forms of their respective genera, with sizes increasing during the Rancholabrean.

Fossils from Port Kennedy Bone Cave are not exclusively from mammals however, with many fossils from turkeys, snakes, turtles, and a unique giant tortoise reported. Notably, Port Kennedy bears a large menagerie of extinct beetles. All of the beetles were briefly described by George Horn in 1874, but little new insight into the remains has been made. Plant fossils too have been recovered, including mosses and a variety of trees.
