= Port Kennedy =

Port Kennedy may refer to:

- Port Kennedy, Pennsylvania
- Port Kennedy, Western Australia
- Former name of the settlement Thursday Island on the Torres Strait island of the same name
