= Valley Forge station =

Railway station in Valley Forge, Pennsylvania

Valley Forge
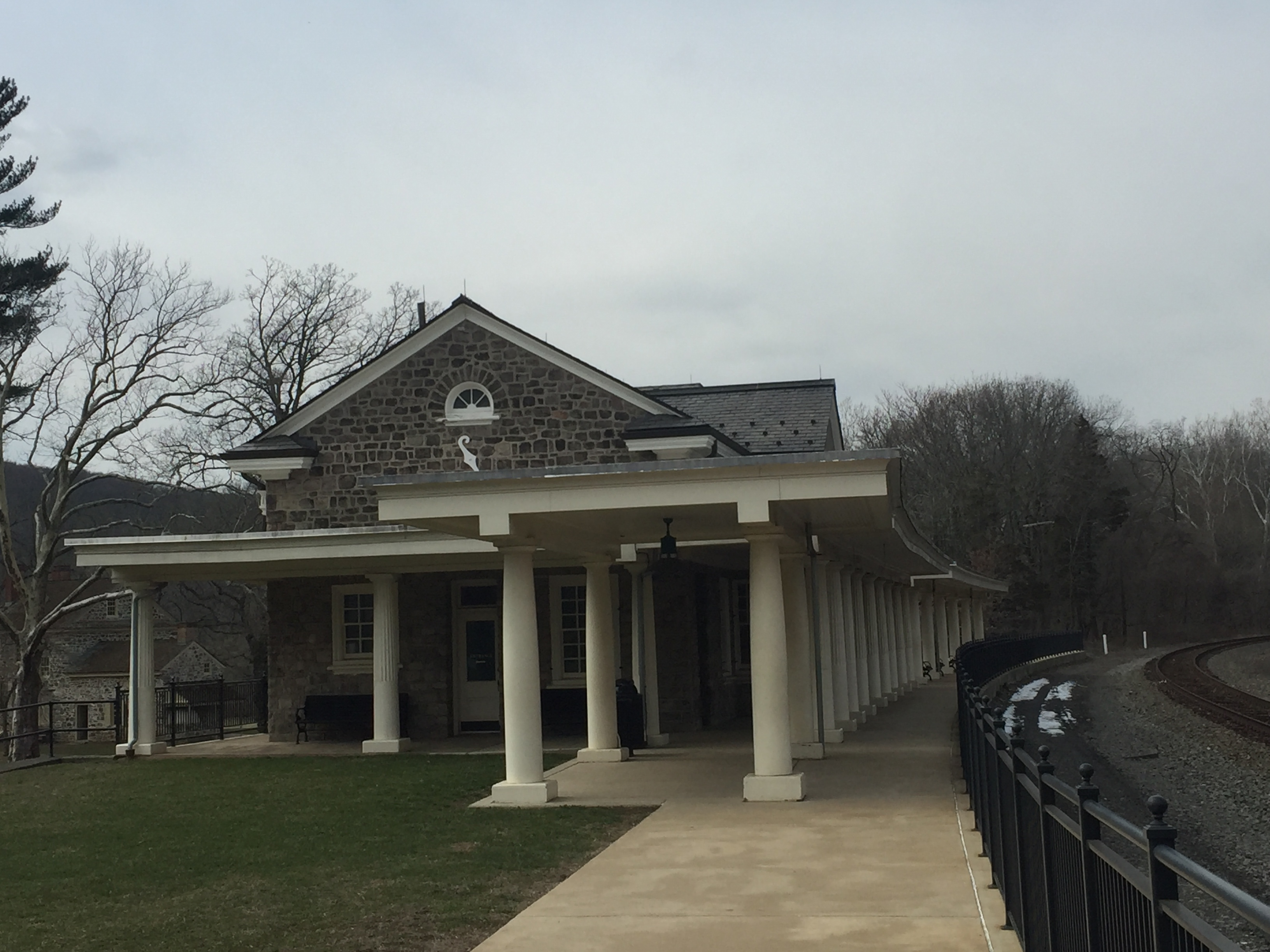
- Valley Forge station in 2018

General information
- Location: Valley Forge Road (PA 23) and River Road; Valley Forge National Historic Park
- Coordinates: 40.102°N 75.4601°W
- System: Former SEPTA regional rail station

Construction
- Accessible: no

History
- Opened: 1911
- Closed: July 26, 1981

Former services
Preceding station	SEPTA	Following station
Phoenixville toward Pottsville	Pottsville Line	Valley Forge Park Closed 1981 toward Reading Terminal
Preceding station	Reading Railroad	Following station
Perkiomen Junction toward Pottsville	Main Line	Port Kennedy toward Philadelphia
Location

Valley Forge station is a former railroad station at the Valley Forge park in Pennsylvania. The station was completed in 1911 by the Reading Railroad and was the point of entry to the park for travelers who came by rail through the 1950s from Philadelphia, 23.7 miles (38.1 km) distant.

The station building was restored in 2009 and is now being used as a museum and information center that offers visitors a better understanding of Washington's headquarters and the village of Valley Forge. Constructed of the same type stone as Washington's Headquarters, the building was erected on a large man-made embankment overlooking the headquarters site.

Near the Visitor Center is another station at Port Kennedy, on the same line. Also owned by the park, the station, both platforms and the former parking area are in a state of disrepair.
