= Charles Wheatley =

Charles Wheatley may refer to:

- Charles Wheatly (1686–1742), English clergyman, known for writings on the Book of Common Prayer
- Charles M. Wheatley (1822–1882), English-American miner and palaeontologist
- Charlie Wheatley (1893–1982), American baseball player, inventor, and businessman
