= Valley Forge Park station =

Former train station in Pennsylvania

Valley Forge Park
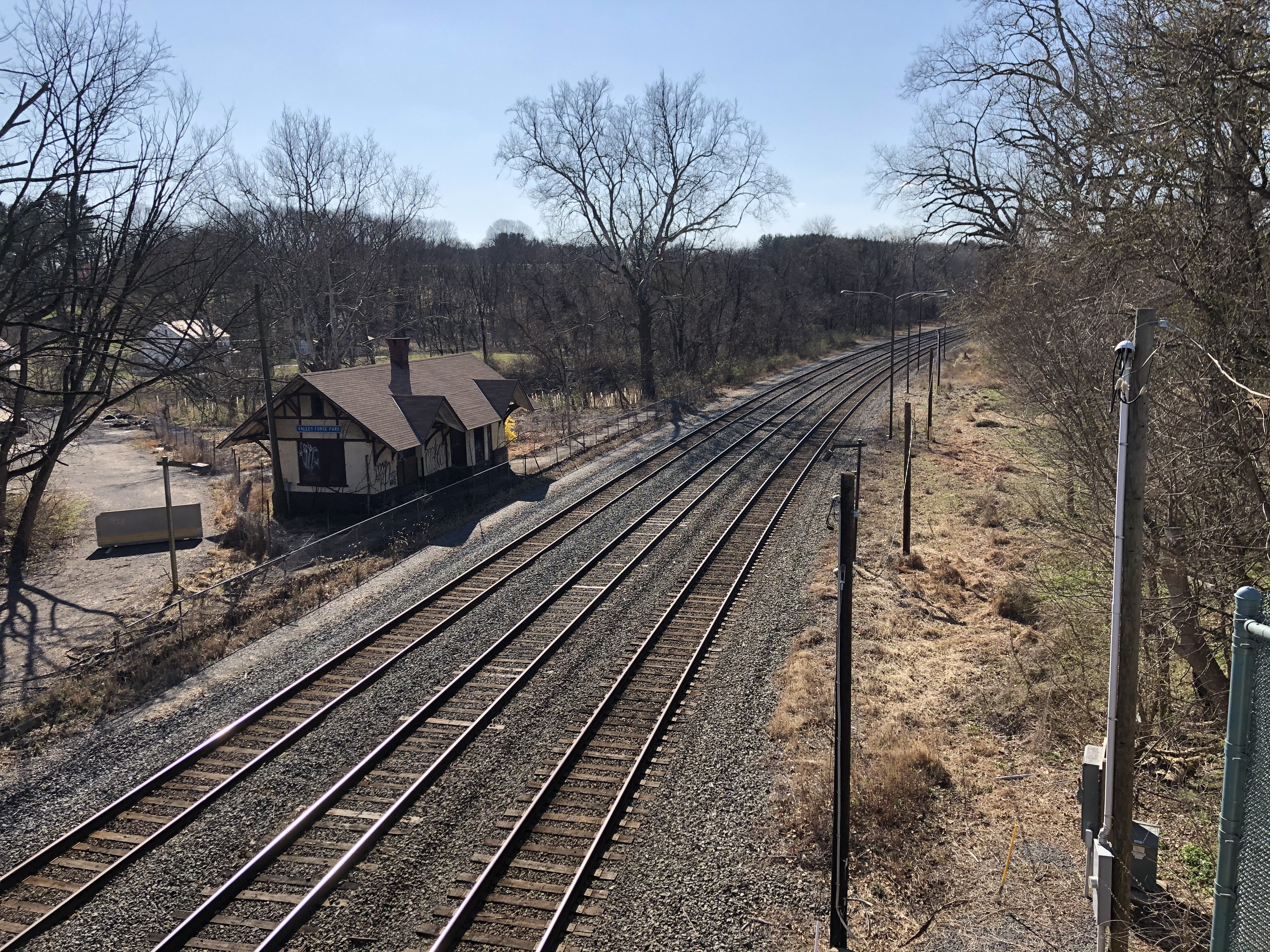

General information
- Other names: Port Kennedy
- Location: Sullivan's Trail, near Trooper Road and US 422 in Upper Merion Township, Montgomery County, Pennsylvania
- Coordinates: 40°06′23″N 75°25′16″W
- System: Former SEPTA regional rail station
- Owner: Pennsylvania Department of Transportation and Conrail
- Platforms: 1 side platform
- Tracks: 3

Construction
- Accessible: No

History
- Opened: July 4, 1976
- Closed: July 26, 1981

Former services
Preceding station	SEPTA	Following station
Valley Forge Closed 1981 toward Pottsville	Pottsville Line	Norristown toward Reading Terminal
Preceding station	Reading Railroad	Following station
Valley Forge toward Pottsville	Main Line	Abrams toward Philadelphia
Location

Valley Forge Park station (also known as Port Kennedy station) is a former train station in Valley Forge, Pennsylvania. The station is visible from Sullivan's Bridge in the Valley Forge National Historic Park. Valley Forge Park station was originally built by the Reading Railroad as Port Kennedy station, and later served the SEPTA diesel service extending from the Norristown section of the Manayunk/Norristown Line to Pottsville. Service was originally suspended prior to SEPTA taking over from Reading Railroad but was opened in 1976 for the American bicentennial. In 1981, the station was closed again when SEPTA discontinued the diesel service.

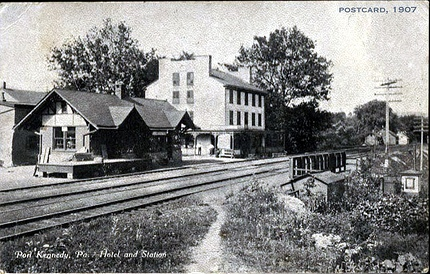
Port Kennedy station and hotel in 1907
