= Kennedy Mansion (Valley Forge) =

Historic house in Pennsylvania, United States

- U.S. National Register of Historic Places
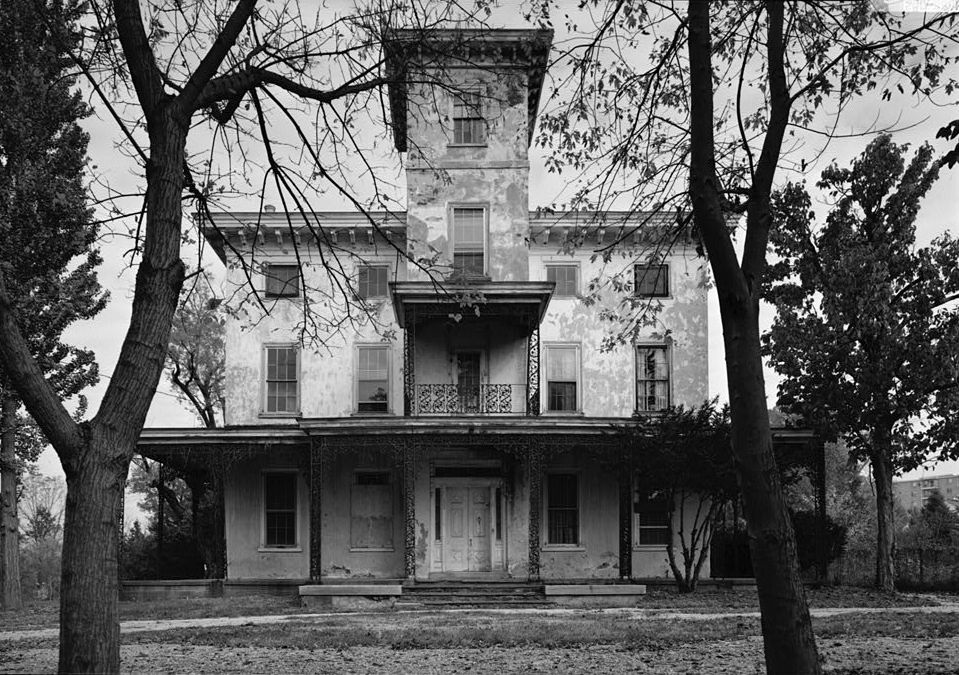
- Kennedy-Supplee Mansion in 1982.
- Location: 1050 Valley Forge Road, Valley Forge National Historical Park, Port Kennedy, Pennsylvania
- Coordinates: 40.104047°N 75.420229°W
- Built: 1852
- NRHP reference No.: 83002262
- Added to NRHP: June 21, 1983

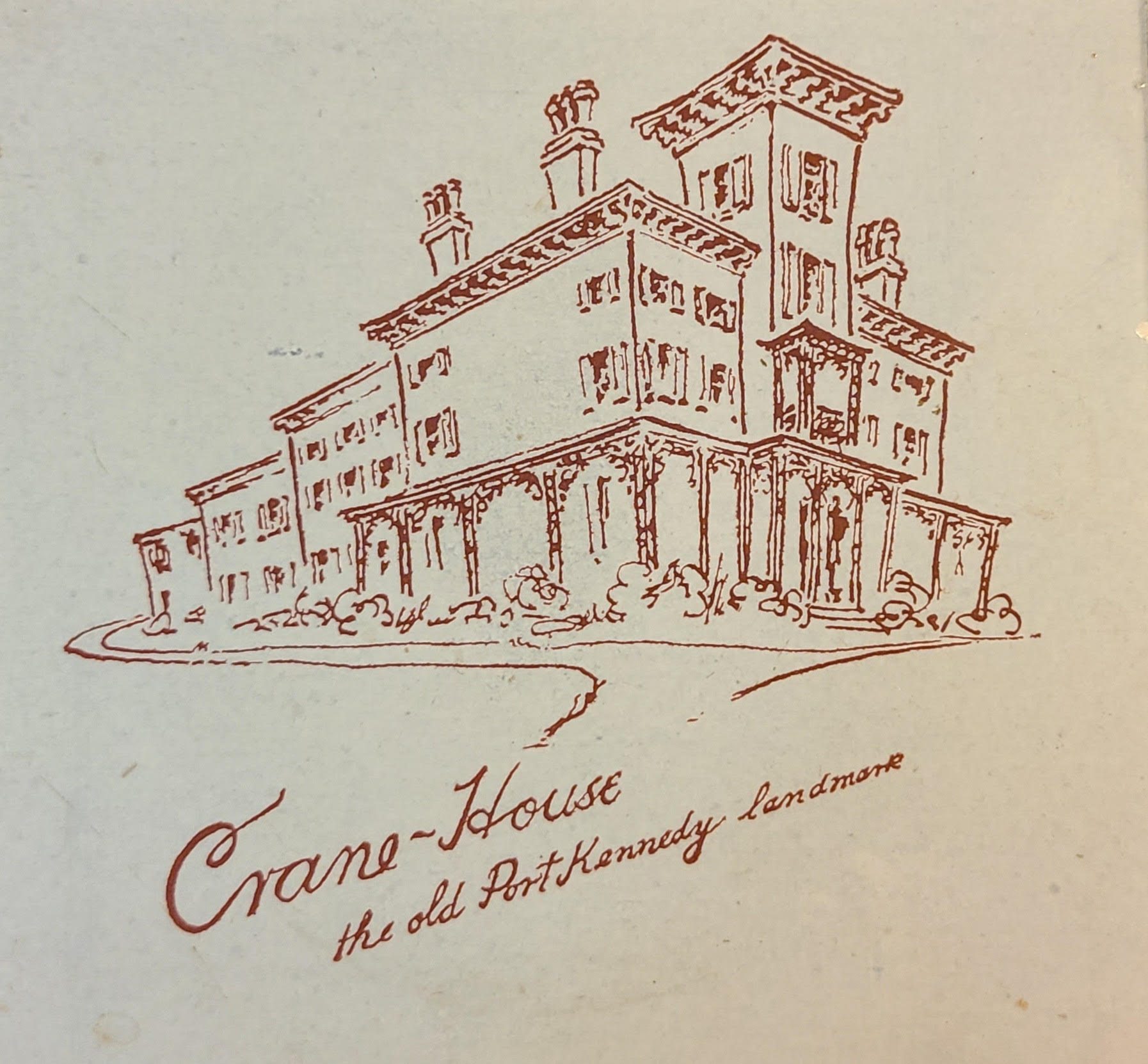
A whimsical drawing of the mansion from the 1950s by Daniel Crane Jr.

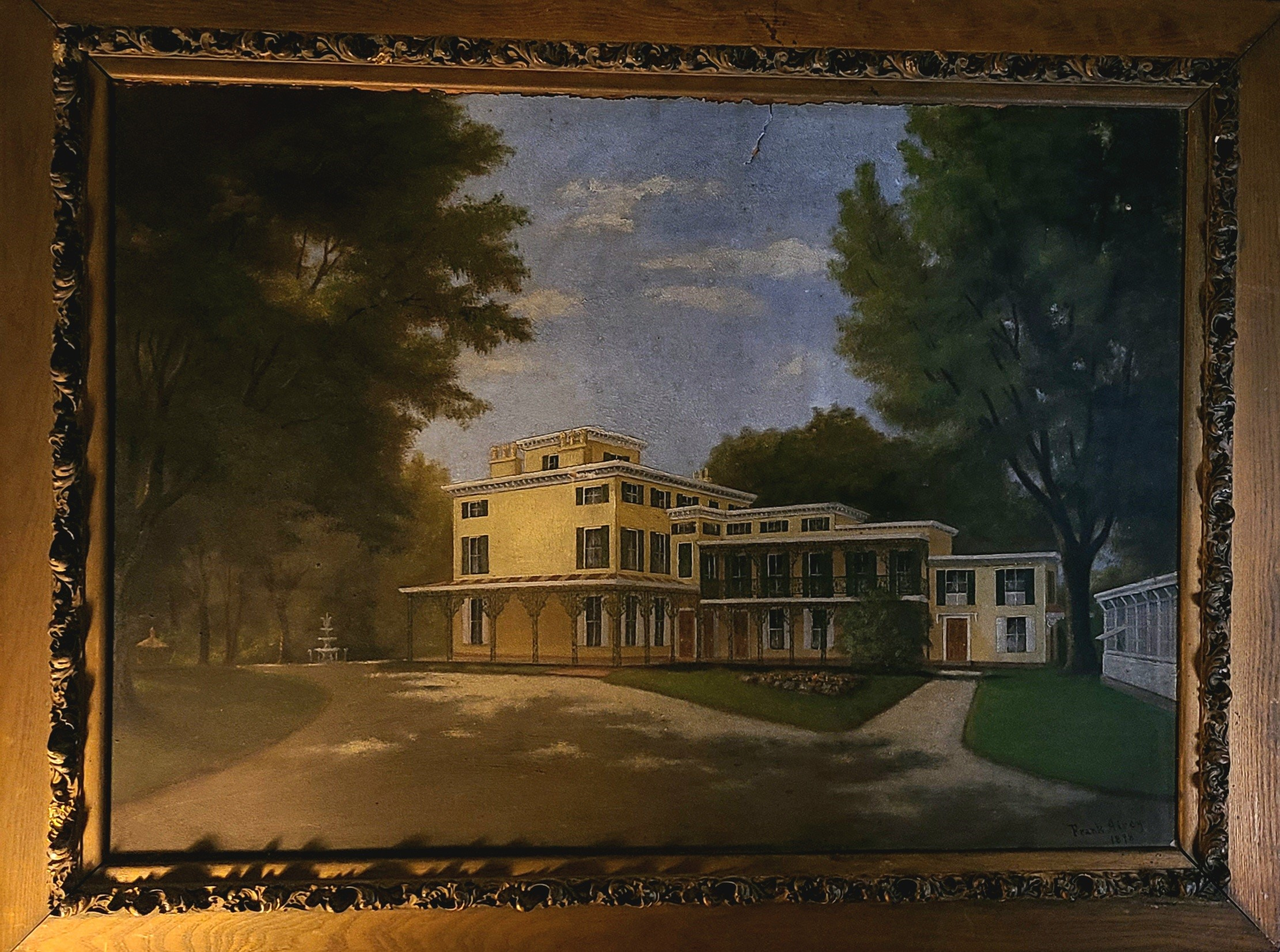
The 1898 Frank Airie painting of the north side of the mansion. This painting hung in the dining room

Kennedy Mansion (Valley Forge), also known as Kennedy-Supplee Mansion, is an Italian-villa-style residence within Valley Forge National Historical Park. Now squeezed between PA Route 23 and U.S. Route 422 (Pottstown Expressway), it once overlooked the 19th-century industrial village of Port Kennedy.

Port Kennedy was named for Alexander Kennedy, a major figure in the American lime industry. Limestone was quarried from the Valley Forge hills and processed into lime, which was shipped on the Schuylkill Canal and, after 1849, on the Reading Railroad. The 1852 mansion and 1845 Port Kennedy Presbyterian Church, now on opposite sides of a highway, a former hotel and train station are all that is left of the village.

Summary from the Historic American Buildings Survey:

When John Kennedy built this mansion in 1852, it was the focal point of Port Kennedy Village. A fine example of the Italian Villa style, it retains many of its exterior and interior features. The first floor rooms, large and well-proportioned, still possess their elegant details and the door and window enframements, which narrow, reflect the Egyptian Revival style. The elaborate plaster ceiling decorations in the principal rooms are superb. They represent the ultimate in craftsmanship in a now almost lost art. Surrounding the main block of the house is a graceful porch with a concave roof supported by cast-iron trellises in a grapevine-and-morning-glory design. A balcony ornaments the second-floor facade of the tower.

The mansion sits on a knoll, which originally overlooked the community and is one of the few structures to survive the decline of the lime and blast furnaces in the area.
John Kennedy was born in 1815, the youngest of Alexander Kennedy's eight children. In 1842 he purchased the lime works at Port Kennedy, and built one of the extensive lime productions in the area. The lime industry and Kennedy flourished during Kennedy's lifetime. The village also included a three-story hotel, a blast furnace with stone house and workshops, a Reading Railroad station, and the Presbyterian Church, a handsome stone structure built in 1845.

John Kennedy died in 1877. His widow remained in the house until her death. Six owners followed. Additions were made to the house ca. 1920, and about 1950. The structure was remodeled into apartments. The National Park Service acquired the property in 1978. The Kennedy Mansion is located in Valley Forge National Historical Park.

From 1911 to 1936, the mansion was owned by J. Henderson Supplee, at the time of his death, one of the last Civil War veterans in Montgomery County. It later served as the Port Kennedy Inn, and a boardinghouse. U.S. Route 422 (Pottstown Expressway) was constructed through the property in the 1960s. Adjacent Valley Forge State Park became Valley Forge National Historical Park in 1976.

In 1947 the Kennedy Mansion was purchased by four siblings of the Crane family: Daniel Edward Crane Jr., Alice Crane Howland, Lucien Horton Crane, and Maia Van Bergen Crane. They were the children of Daniel Edward Crane Sr. and Jane Horton Crane of Sewickley, Pennsylvania. Two other siblings chose not to join the venture. The Crane siblings planned to renovate the house into six apartments in which they could live and two for rental. At that time the house and property were rundown and needed significant work to bring it back to its former elegance. They renamed it Crane House and Gardens.

Maia Crane was a horticulturist and landscape designer, and she used portions of the property (48 acres) for her plant nursery. She specialized in pink flowering Dogwood trees. The property had several outbuildings including a carriage house, a gazebo, a cottage, and a building that had housed livestock. Daniel Crane was a designer and created a studio in which he worked on clients' projects. Daniel was also employed by the John Wanamaker department store in Philadelphia in the design and display department which well known in the 1950s for its captivating Christmas window displays.

Tragedy struck in 1956 when Alice Crane's daughter, Jane Howland Coleman was killed in a car accident. The Cranes decided to create a family burial sanctuary at the far end of their property that abutted Port Kennedy Presbyterian Church burial ground. Five acres were given to the church so that the family sanctuary could become part of the church's burial ground. Ten members of the Crane family are buried there.

The Cranes continued to own the property until 1967 although none of the original family members lived there. It was sold to the state of Pennsylvania for the expansion of U.S. Route 422 (Pottstown Expressway).

In 1978, the National Park Service acquired the mansion through eminent domain, and used it to house Park employees. In 1986, Kennedy Supplee Associates LP signed a 55-year lease with the park service, restored the building, and operated it as the Kennedy-Supplee Mansion Restaurant. The private company entered Chapter 11 bankruptcy in 2005, and auctioned off its assets in April 2006. The mansion is now vacant.
