= Charles M. Wheatley =

American paleontologist (1822–1882)

Charles M. Wheatley A. M.
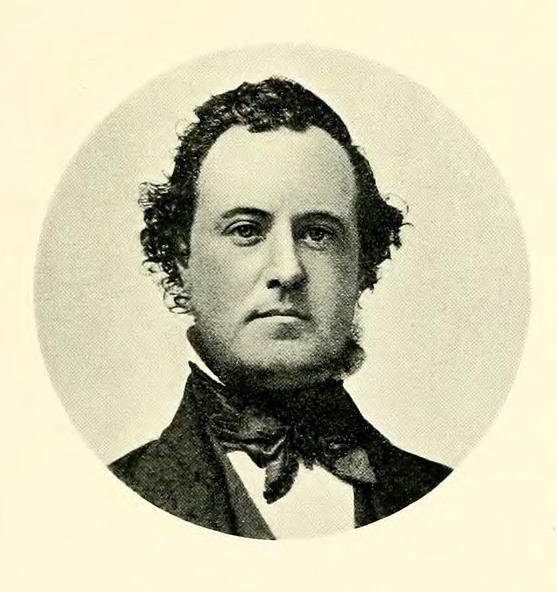
- A noted miner and palaeontologist of the 19th century
- Born: March 16, 1822; Ongar, England
- Died: May 6, 1882 (aged 60); Phoenixville, Pennsylvania
- Occupations: miner and palaeontologist
- Known for: Identifying several new fossilized species

Charles Moore Wheatley (16 March 1822 – 6 May 1882) was an American miner and palaeontologist of the 19th century. He is noted for identifying several new fossilized species, some of which bear his name, and for his connection to the Port Kennedy Bone Cave, which contained one of the most important middle Pleistocene (Irvingtonian, approximately 750,000 years ago) fossil deposits in North America. In 1879, he was elected as a member to the American Philosophical Society.

He also managed successful mines in Connecticut and Pennsylvania, including a lead mine in Phoenixville, Pennsylvania.

== Species ==
- Cychrus Wheatleyi
- Megalonyx wheatleyi
