= Port Kennedy, Pennsylvania =

Unincorporated community in Pennsylvania, US

- Unincorporated community
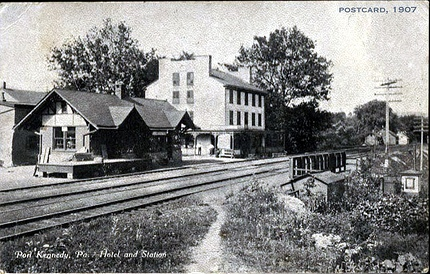
- "Port Kennedy, Pa. Hotel and Station" (1907).

- Location within Pennsylvania
- Coordinates: 40.103942°N 75.418750°W
- Country: United States
- State: Pennsylvania
- County: Montgomery
- Township: Upper Merion
- Time zone: UTC-5 (Eastern (EST))
  - Summer (DST): UTC-4 (EDT)
- Area codes: 610 and 484

Port Kennedy was an industrial village located where U.S. Route 422 (Pottstown Expressway) now crosses the Schuylkill River in Upper Merion Township, Montgomery County, Pennsylvania, United States.

== History and notable features ==
Built along the Schuylkill Canal and, after 1838, the Reading Railroad, this village was a center for the lime industry during the nineteenth century. It was named for Alexander Kennedy, owner of local quarries and kilns.

Beginning in 1871, a number of important fossils were unearthed at Port Kennedy. The location of the find was forgotten until 2006, when the Port Kennedy Bone Cave was rediscovered.

In 1919, the State of Pennsylvania seized the land of the village through eminent domain to expand the growing Valley Forge State Park.

Planning for U.S. Route 422 between U.S. Route 202 and Trooper Road began in 1964. Most of the village was demolished for construction of the superhighway and the Betzwood Bridge, which opened to traffic in 1967.

Today, U.S. Route 422 separates the First Presbyterian Church of Port Kennedy (1845) from the Kennedy Mansion (1852). They, along with the Reading Railroad station and one house, are the only surviving buildings from the village.
