= Valley Forge National Historical Park =

Site of the third winter encampment of the Continental Army

- U.S. National Register of Historic Places
- U.S. National Historic Landmark District
- U.S. National Historical Park
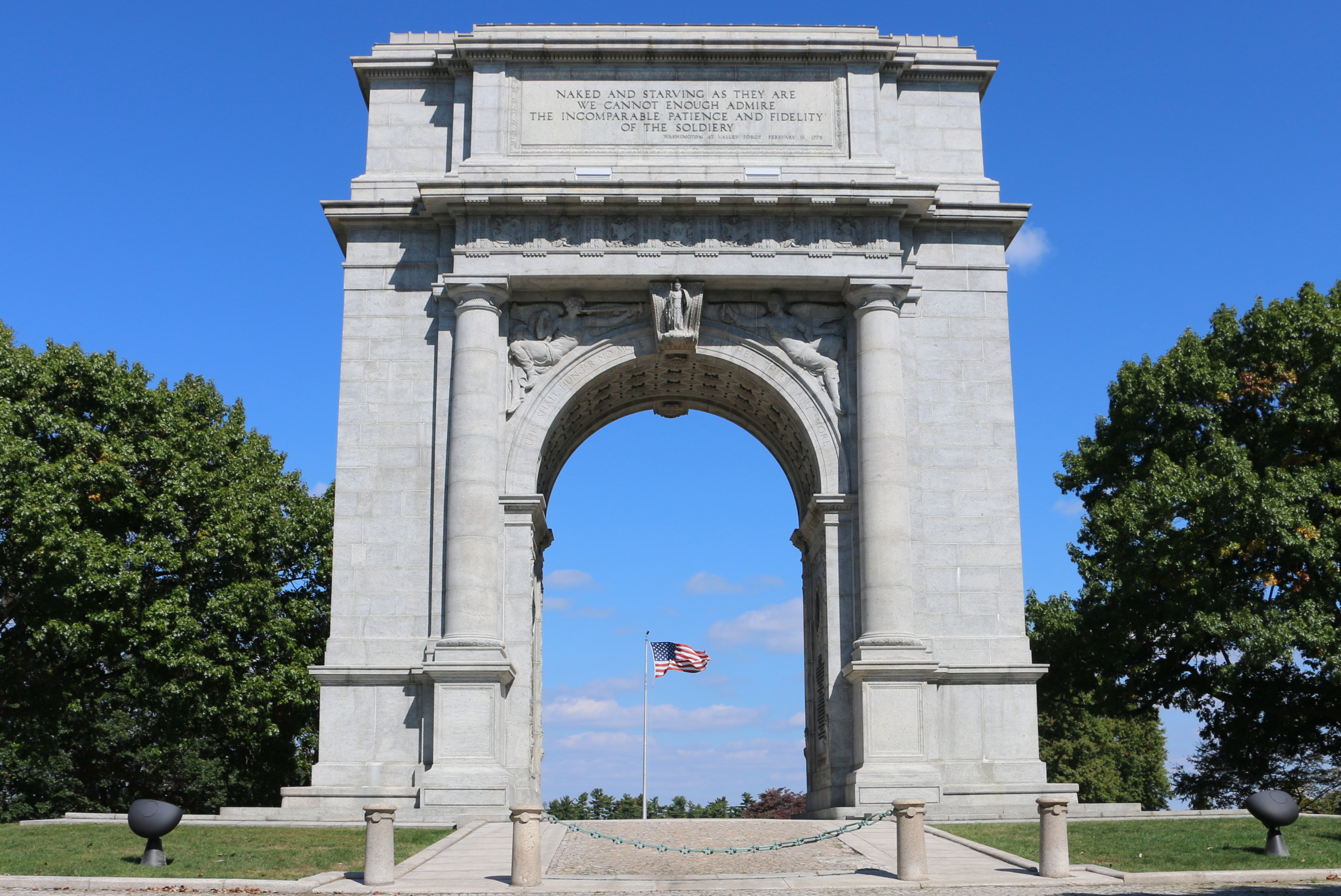
- The National Memorial Arch at the park

- Location within Pennsylvania Location within the United States
- Location: Montgomery County and Chester County, Pennsylvania
- Nearest city: King of Prussia, Pennsylvania
- Coordinates: 40°05′49″N 75°26′20″W
- Area: 3,466 acres (1,403 ha)
- Visitation: 1,645,298 (2022)
- Website: Valley Forge National Historical Park
- NRHP reference No.: 66000657

Significant dates
- Added to NRHP: October 15, 1966
- Designated NHLD: January 20, 1961
- Designated NHP: State Park: 1893; National Historical Park: July 4, 1976

Valley Forge National Historical Park is the site of the third winter encampment of the Continental Army during the American Revolutionary War from December 19, 1777 to June 19, 1778. The National Park Service (NPS) preserves the site and interprets the history of the Valley Forge encampment. The park contains historical buildings, recreated encampment structures, memorials, museums, and recreation facilities.

The park occupies 3,500 acres (1,400 ha) and is visited by nearly 2 million people each year. There are restored historic structures, reconstructed structures such as the iconic log huts, and monuments erected by the states from which the Continental soldiers came. There is a museum with exhibits of original artifacts. The park also provides over 30 miles (48 km) of hiking and biking trails, which are connected to the regional trails system.

== Historical encampment ==
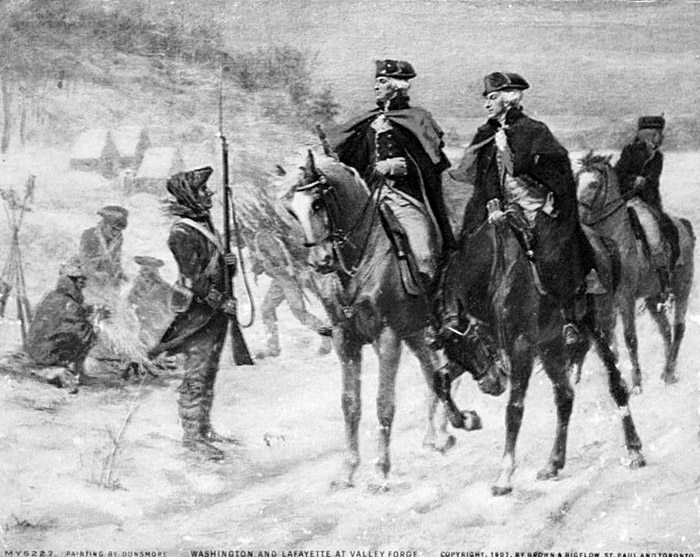
An illustration of Washington and Lafayette at Valley Forge

Approximately 12,000 Continental Army troops under General George Washington's command were encamped at Valley Forge from December 19, 1777 to June 19, 1778. After British General Howe captured the American capitol of Philadelphia, Washington chose the site for the encampment because it was between the British and the Second Continental Congress in York, as well as supply depots in Reading. At the same time, Valley Forge was far enough from Philadelphia to make a British surprise attack unlikely, but close enough that Continental forces could scout enemy positions and prevent them from foraging the countryside.

The Valley Forge encampment was one of the most trying moments for the Continental Army during the war, but they also used the encampment to retrain and rejuvenate. The shared hardship of the officers and soldiers of the Continental Army and the professional military training provided by Baron Friedrich von Steuben are considered a turning point in the Revolutionary War, which secured the independence of the Thirteen Colonies and the establishment of the United States.

== Park history ==
The Centennial and Memorial Association of Valley Forge was incorporated in 1878 with the purpose of saving, acquiring, and preserving General Washington's Headquarters and surrounding acreage. A large Centennial event was held on June 19, 1878, the 100th anniversary of Washington's Army exiting Valley Forge.

Valley Forge was established as the first state park of Pennsylvania in 1893 by the Valley Forge Park Commission (VFPC) "to preserve, improve, and maintain as a public park the site on which General George Washington's army encamped at Valley Forge." The area around Washington's headquarters was chosen as the park site. In 1923, the VFPC was brought under the Department of Forests and Waters, then incorporated into the Pennsylvania Historical and Museum Commission in 1971.

Valley Forge was designated a U.S. National Historic Landmark in 1961 and was listed in the initial National Register of Historic Places in 1966. The area covered by these listings goes outside what was then Valley Forge State Park boundaries to include four historic houses where the Marquis de Lafayette and other officers were quartered.

In 1975, the Pennsylvania Historical and Museum Commission (PHMC), a state agency overseeing cultural heritage stewardship, released a master plan addressing preservation challenges at Valley Forge. This initiative aimed to reassert the site's historical significance through systematic redevelopment, integrating archaeological integrity with public interpretation frameworks.

In 1976, Pennsylvania gave the park as a gift to the nation for the United States Bicentennial. Congress passed a law, signed by President Gerald Ford on July 4, 1976, authorizing the addition of Valley Forge National Historical Park as the 283rd Unit of the National Park System and allocating a budget for essential facilities.

== Park Superintendents ==
=== State Park Superintendents ===
1. Frederick D. Stone (1893–1895)
2. Holstein DeHaven (1895–1898)
3. Charles C. Adams (1899–1903)
4. A. H. Bowen (1903–1911)
5. Col. S. S. Hartranft (1911–1921)
6. John S. Kennedy (1921–1924)
7. Jerome J. Sheas (1925–1935)
8. Gilbert S. Jones (1935–1938)
9. Joseph E. Stott (1938–1940)
10. E. F. Brouse (1940–1941)
11. L. Ralph Phillips (1941–1953)
12. Paul E. Felton (1953–1955)
13. George F. Kenworthy (1955–1957)
14. Wilford P. Moll (1957–1958)
15. E. C. Pyle (1958–1966)
16. Wilford P. Moll (1966–1969)
17. Charles C. Frost, Jr. (1969–1971)
18. Horace Wilcox (1971–1976)

=== National Park Superintendents ===
1. H. Gilbert Lusk (1976–1981)
2. Wallace Elms (1981–1990)
3. Warren Beach (1990–1996)
4. Arthur L. Stewart (1996–2004)
5. Mike Caldwell (2004–2011)
6. Kate Hammond (2012–2016)
7. Steven Sims (2017–2019)
8. Rose Fennell (2020–present)

== Features and facilities ==
=== Washington's Headquarters ===
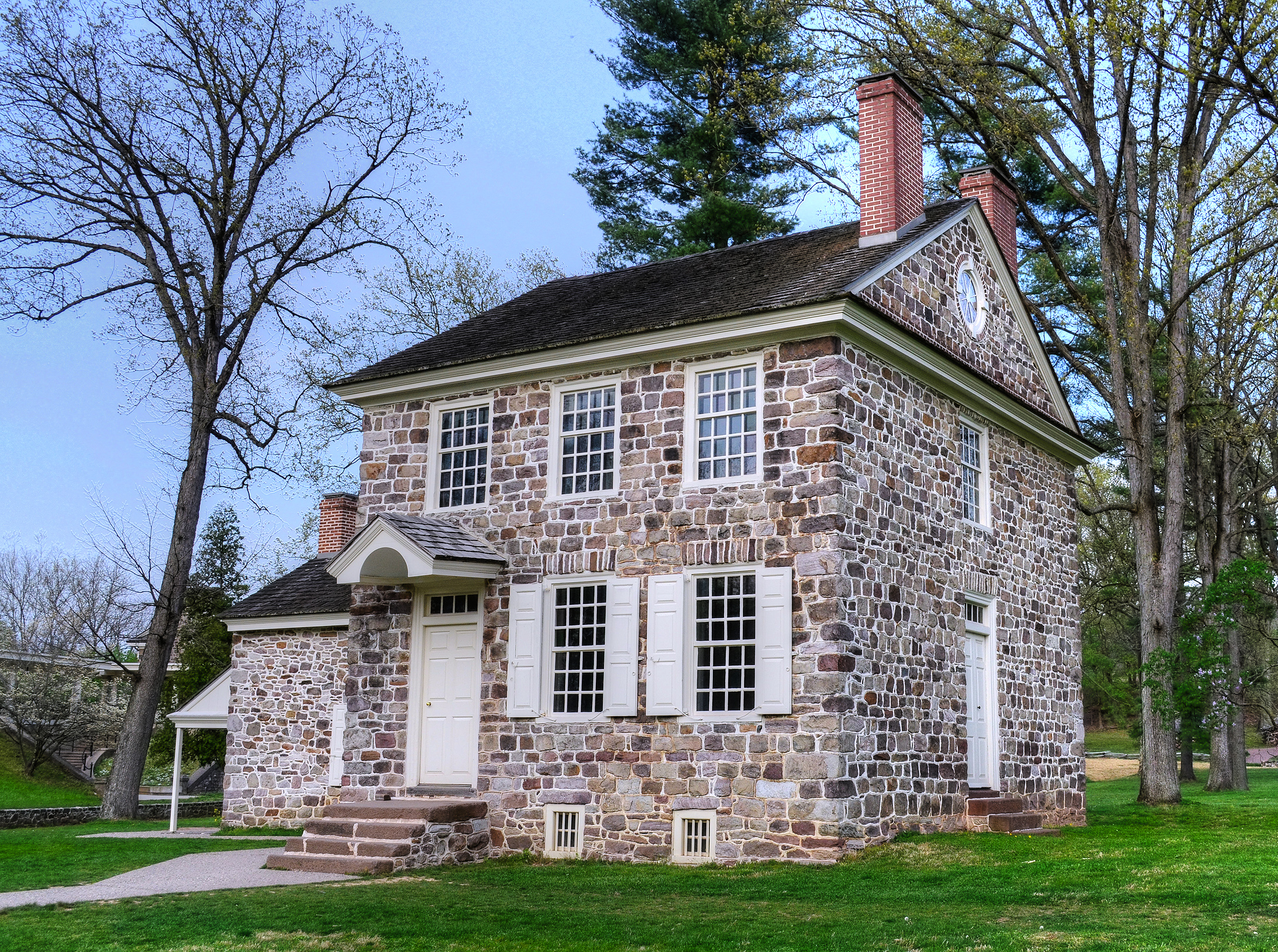
Washington's Headquarters

A key attraction of the park is the restored colonial home used by General George Washington as his headquarters during the encampment. Rehabilitation of the headquarters area was completed in summer 2009 and included the restoration of the old Valley Forge Train Station into an information center, new guided tours, new exhibits throughout the landscape, and the elimination of several acres of modern paving and restoration of the historic landscape. Quarters of other Continental Army generals are also in the park, including those of Generals Varnum, Lord Stirling, Lafayette, and Knox.

=== Reconstructed works and buildings ===
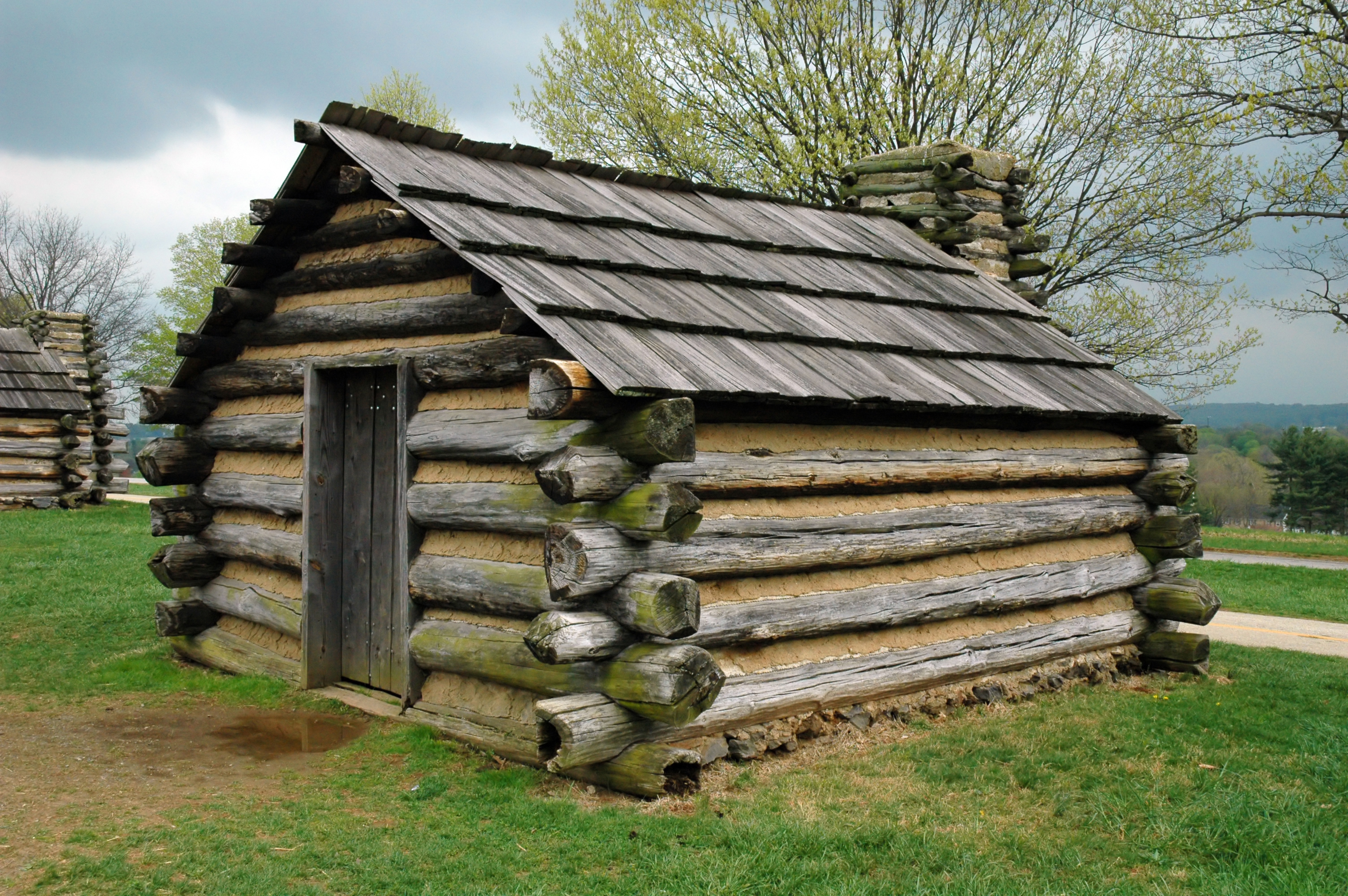
Recreation of a cabin in which soldiers would have lived at Valley Forge

Throughout the park there are reconstructed log cabins of the type thought to be used during the encampment. Earthworks are visible for the defense of the encampment, including four redoubts, the ditch for the Inner Line Defenses, and a reconstructed abatis.

=== Washington Memorial Chapel ===
The Washington Memorial Chapel, an inholding of the park, and National Patriots Bell Tower carillon sit atop a hill at the center of the park. The chapel is a functioning Episcopal Church, built as a tribute to Washington. The bell tower houses the Daughters of the American Revolution Patriot Rolls, listing those who served in the Revolutionary War.

=== Memorial markers ===
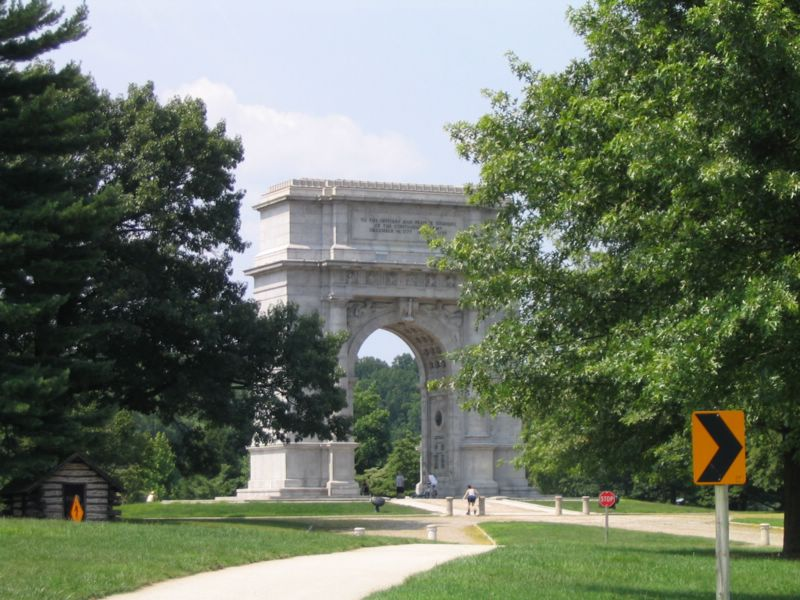
The National Memorial Arch

The National Memorial Arch dominates the southern portion of the park and is dedicated "to the officers and private soldiers of the Continental Army December 19, 1777 – June 19, 1778". It was commissioned by Congress in 1910 and completed in 1917. It is inscribed with George Washington's tribute to the perseverance and endurance of his army:

Naked and Starving as they are
We cannot enough admire
the Incomparable Patience and Fidelity
of the Soldiery.

— George Washington

The drive is lined with large memorial stones for each of the brigades that encamped there. Crossing Gulph Road at the arch, the drive proceeds through the Pennsylvania Columns and past the hilltop statue of Anthony Wayne on a horse. More brigade markers line PA Route 23.

=== Trails ===
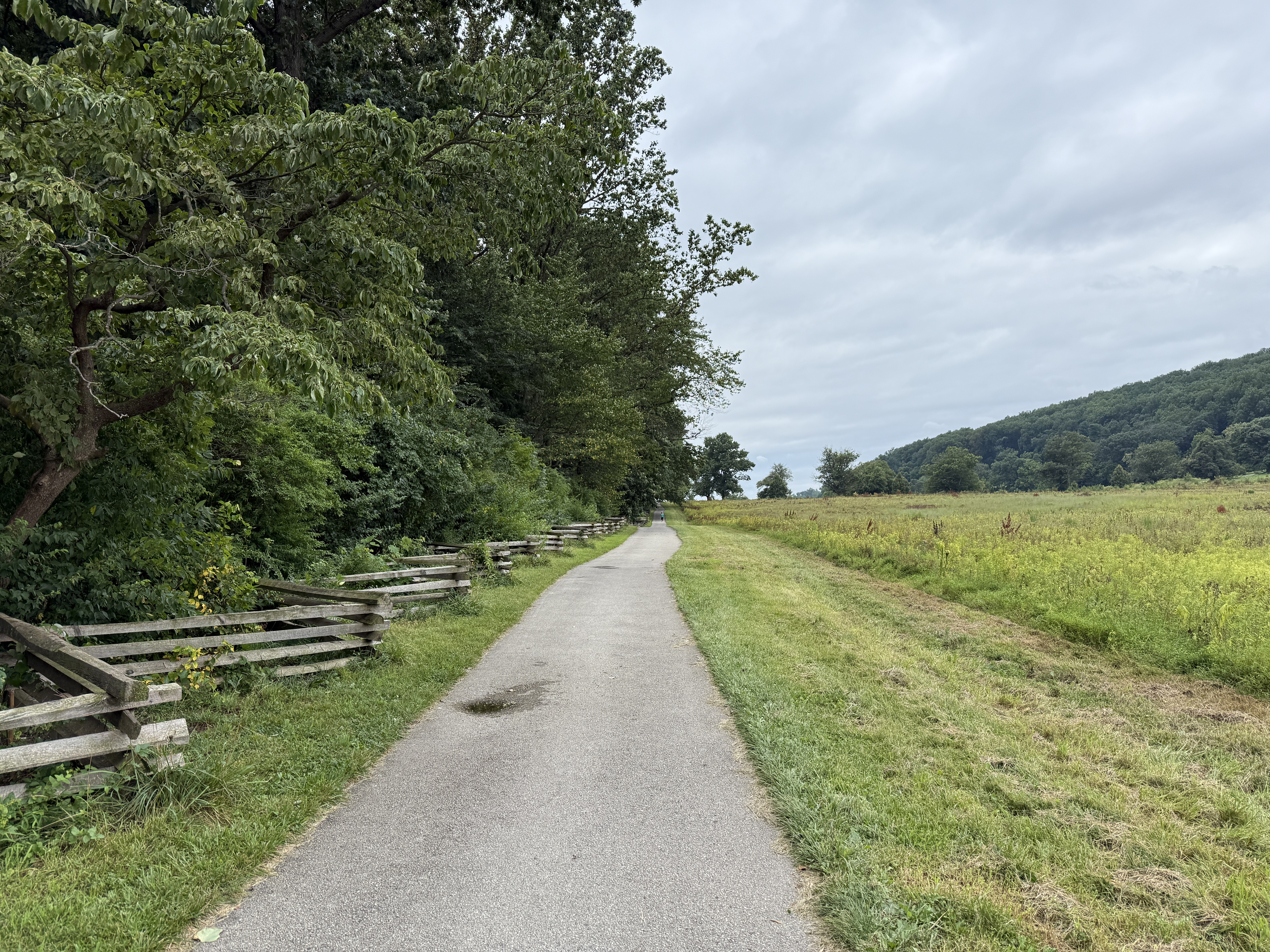
Joseph Plumb Martin Trail

There are over 30 miles (48 km) of hiking, biking, and horseback riding trails within the park, such as the Valley Creek Trail and the River Trail. The main trail is the Joseph Plumb Martin Trail, which consists of a 5-mile (8 km) loop of the park. Portions of regional trails also run through the park, including the Horse Shoe Trail and the Schuylkill River Trail.

== Train station ==
The Valley Forge Train Station is near Washington's Headquarters. It was completed in 1911 by the Reading Railroad and was the point of entry to the park for travelers who came by rail through the 1950s from Philadelphia, 23.7 miles (38.1 km) distant. The station was restored in 2009 and is used as a museum and information center that offers visitors a better understanding of Washington's Headquarters and the village of Valley Forge. It is constructed of the same type of stone as Washington's Headquarters.

== Modern problems ==
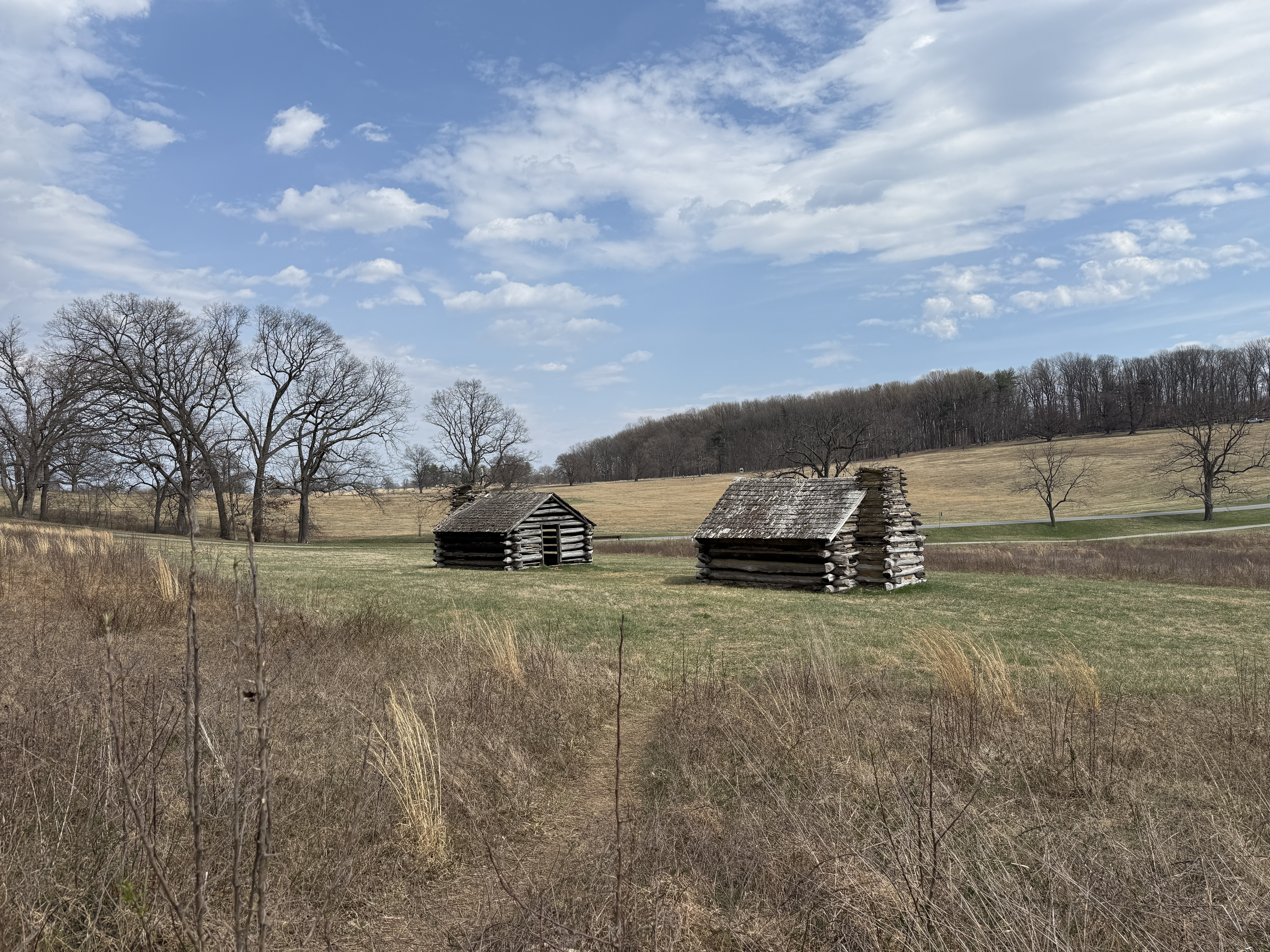
Cabins and fields at Valley Forge

A 61-acre (25 ha) tract of land within the park boundaries was purchased by Toll Brothers in 2002, a real estate development company, for $3.15 million. In 2004, development plans ended after the National Park Service bought it from Toll for $7.5 million.

In 2007, the non-profit American Revolution Center purchased 78 acres (32 ha) of land within the park boundary with plans to construct a conference center, hotel, retail, campground, and museum on the site. The National Parks Conservation Association and local citizens sued Lower Providence Township over the zoning change that enabled this proposal. The two parties agreed to allow the NPS to keep the land, and in exchange, the American Revolution Center was given property in Philadelphia, where it built the Museum of the American Revolution.

An overpopulation of white-tailed deer has resulted in "changes in the species composition, abundance, and distribution of native plant communities and associated wildlife" in the park. In 2008, the National Park Service released a draft deer management plan and environmental impact statement for public review. The intent of the plan was to "support long-term protection, preservation, and restoration of native vegetation and other natural resources within the park." Hunting is prohibited by the legislation that created the park, and action by Congress would be required before it could be sanctioned.

== Gallery ==
Valley Forge National Historical Park Picture Gallery
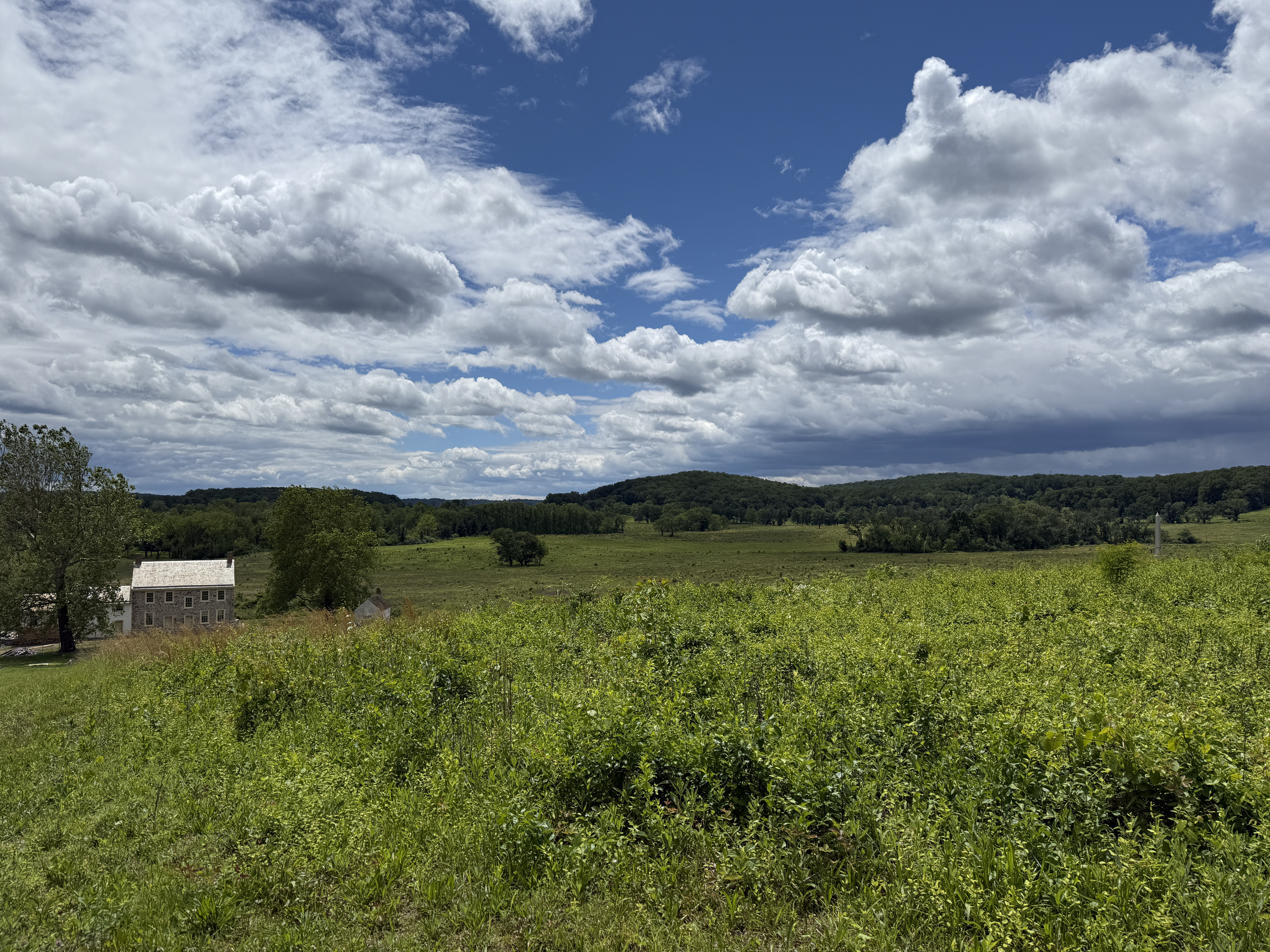
Open field in the park

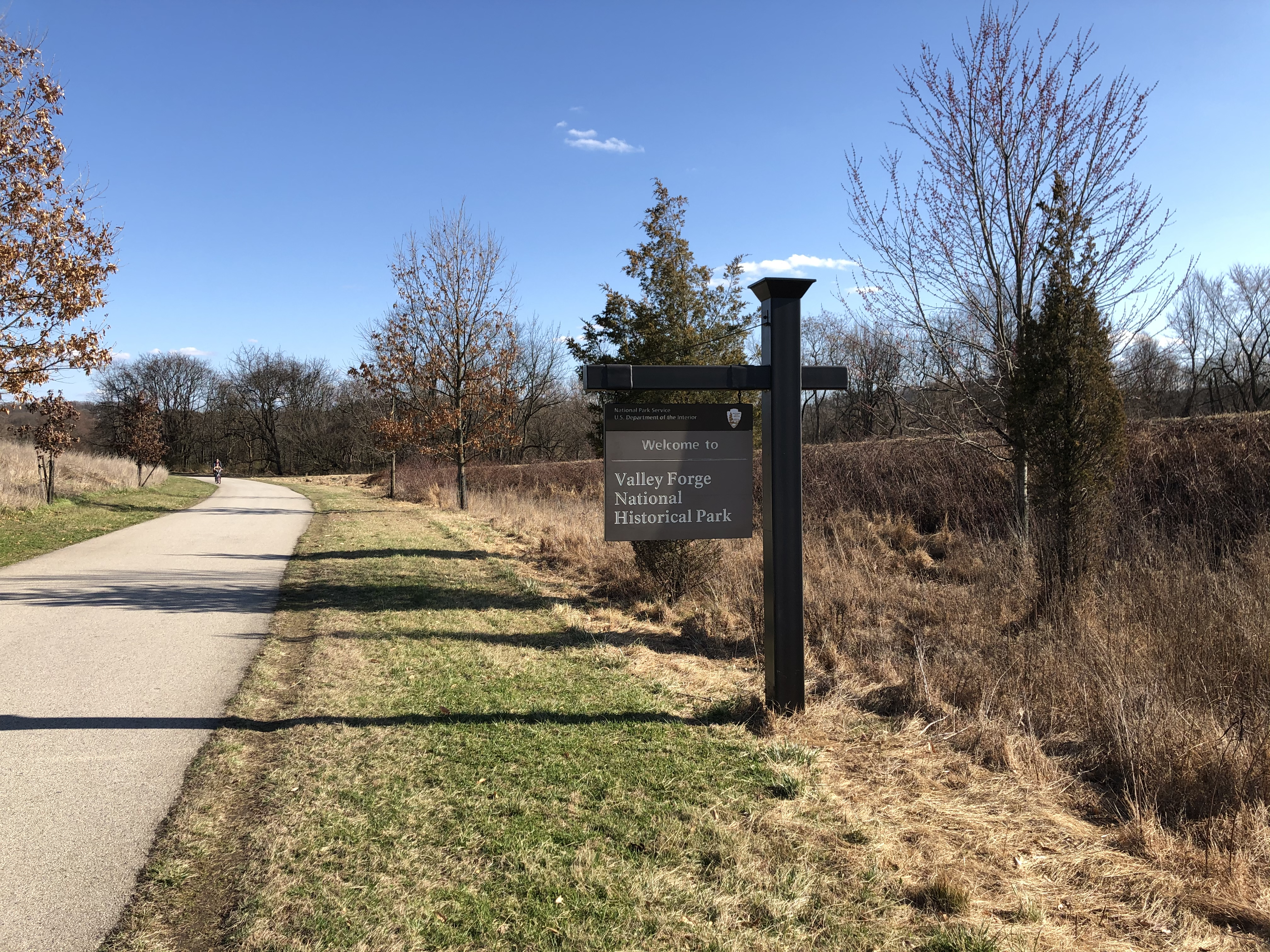
Welcome sign on the Schuylkill River Trail

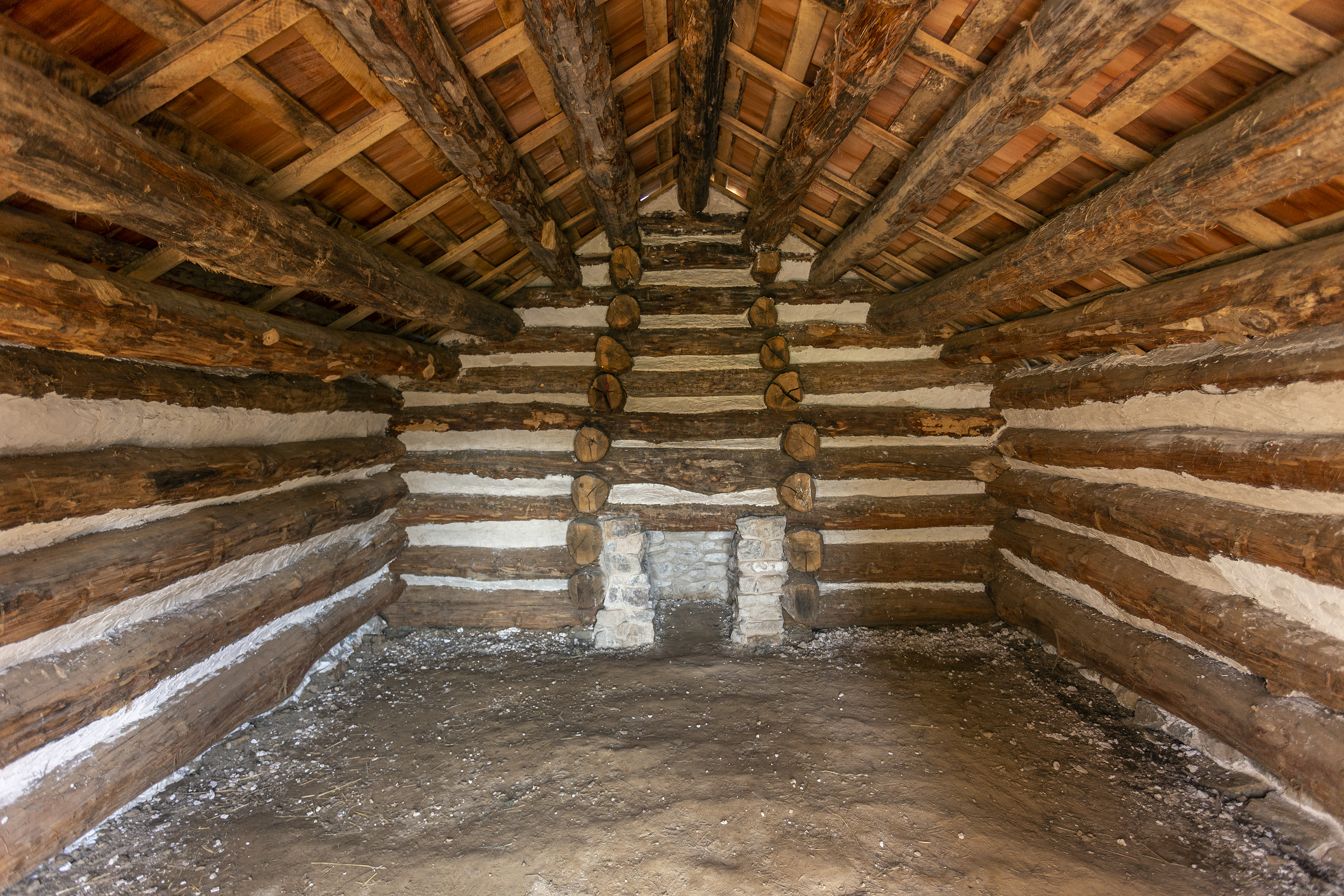
Reconstructed soldier cabin at Valley Forge National Historical Park, Pennsylvania, USA

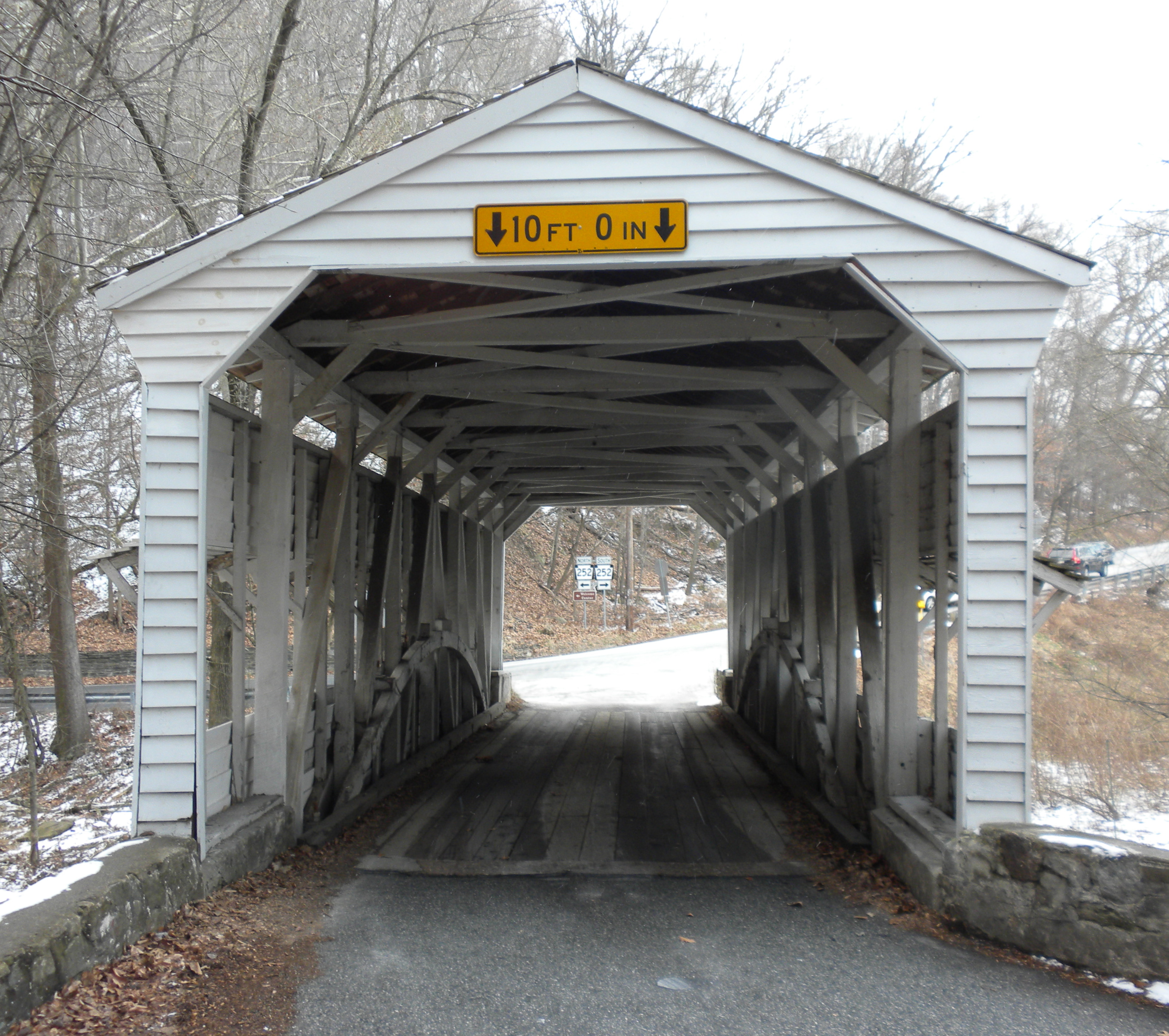
Knox Covered Bridge in Valley Forge National Historical Park across Valley Run (creek) near Lord Stirling's Quarters

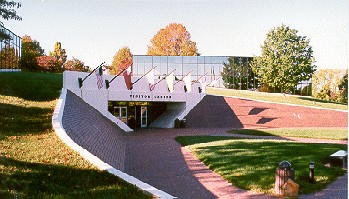
Valley Forge Park Visitor Center

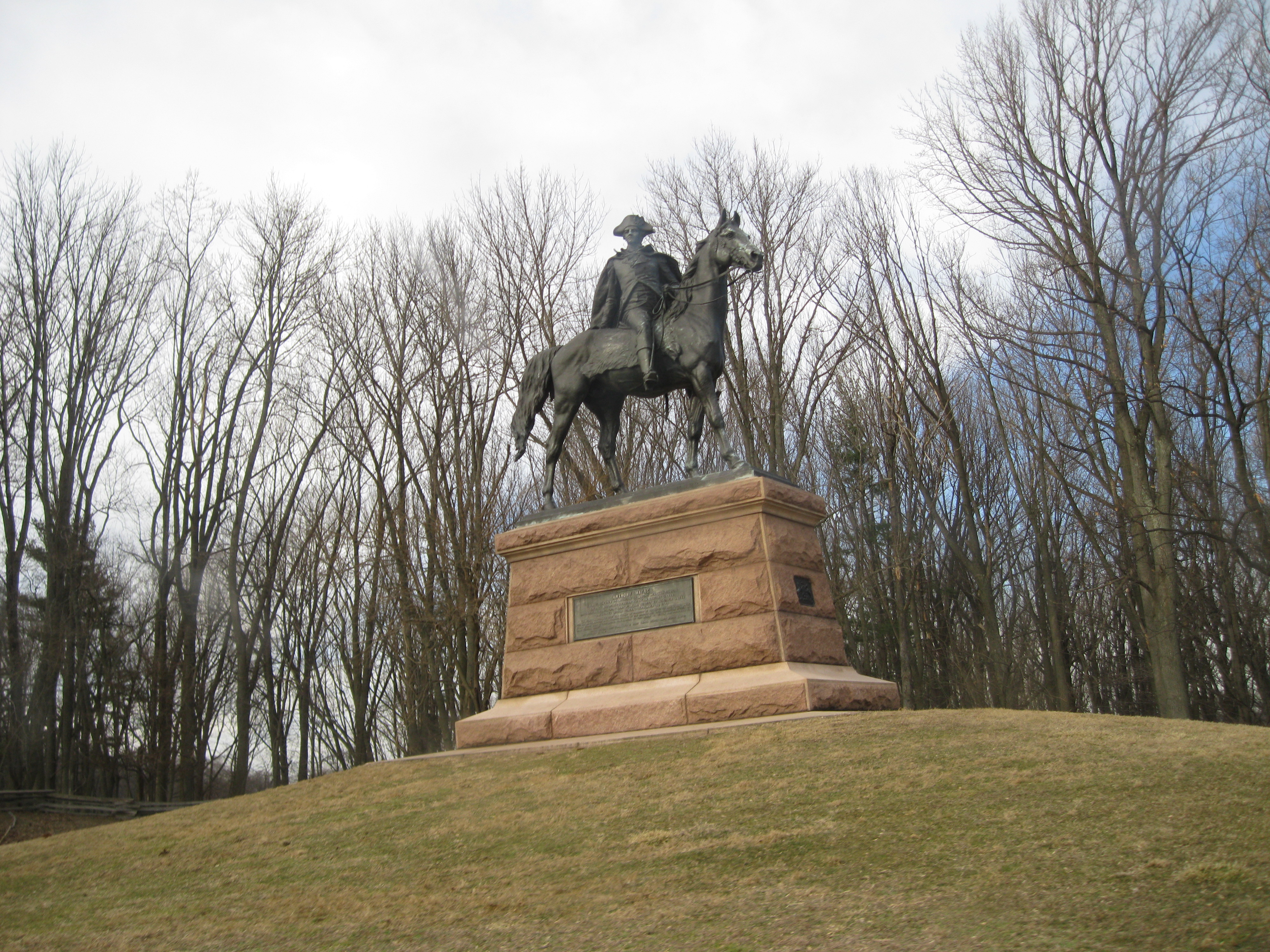
Anthony Wayne statue at Valley Forge, PA

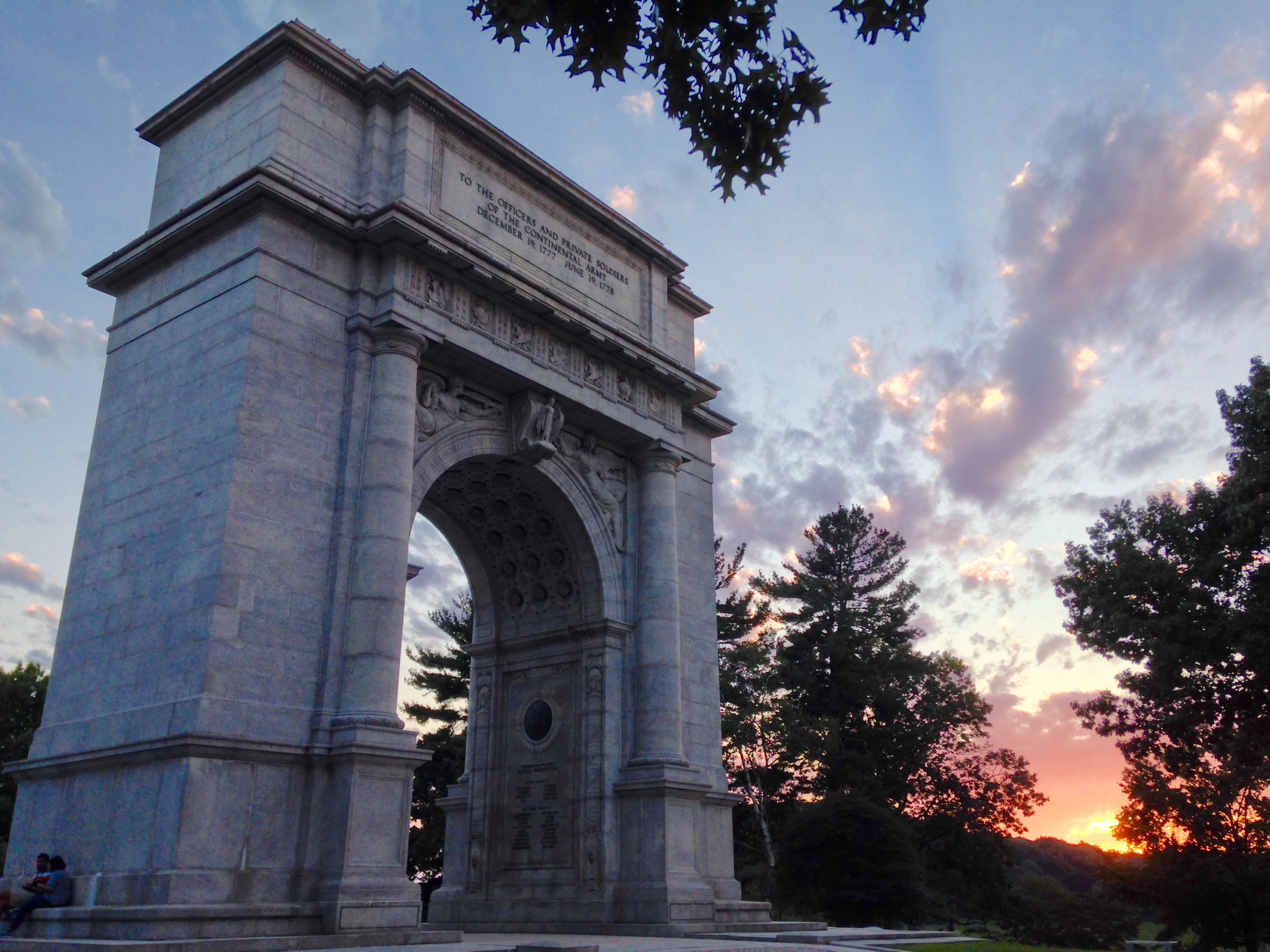
Valley Forge Memorial Arch in Valley Forge National Park, Valley Forge, PA

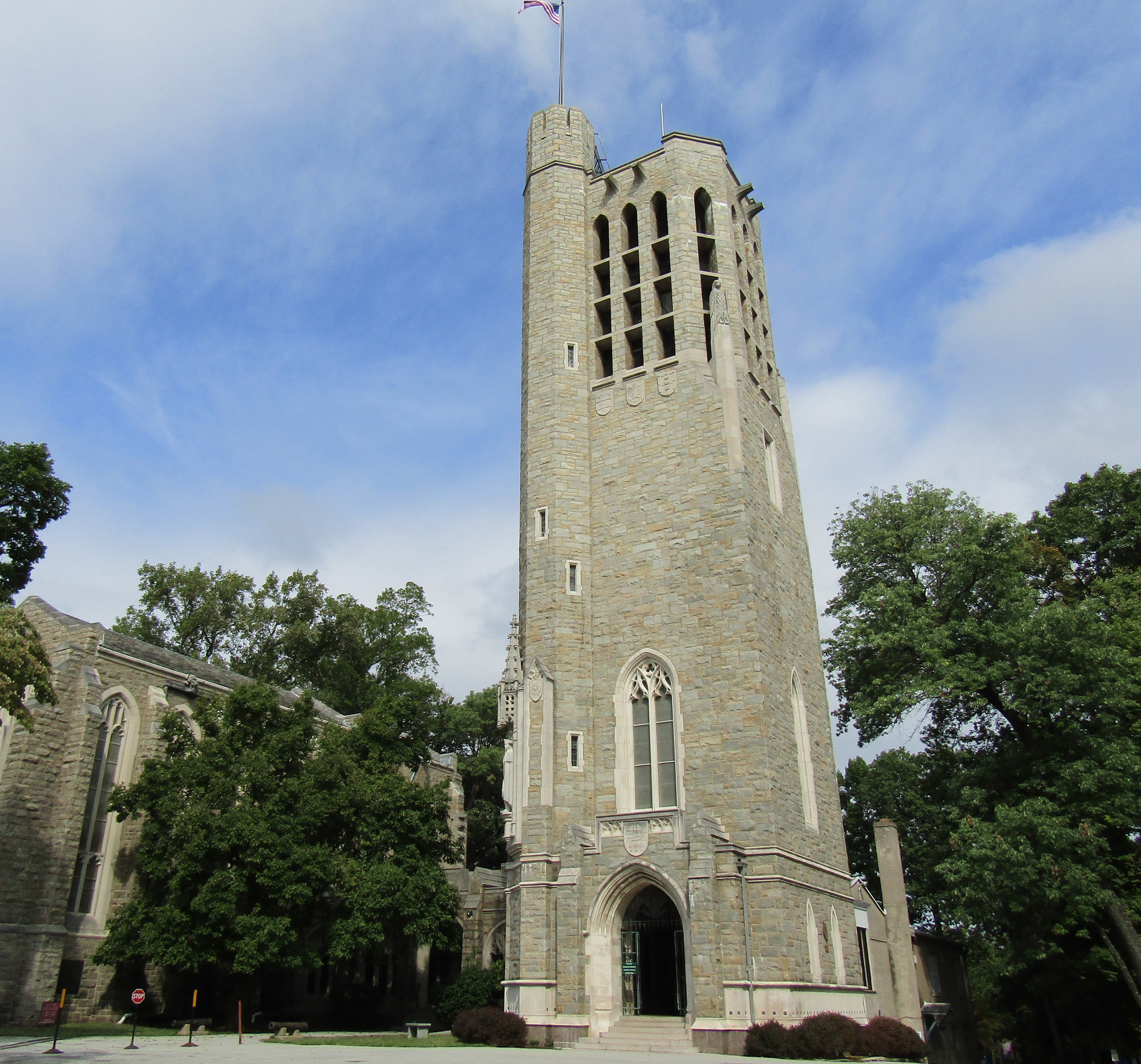
Washington Memorial Chapel (construction started 1903) located within the Valley Forge National Historical Park in Pennsylvania

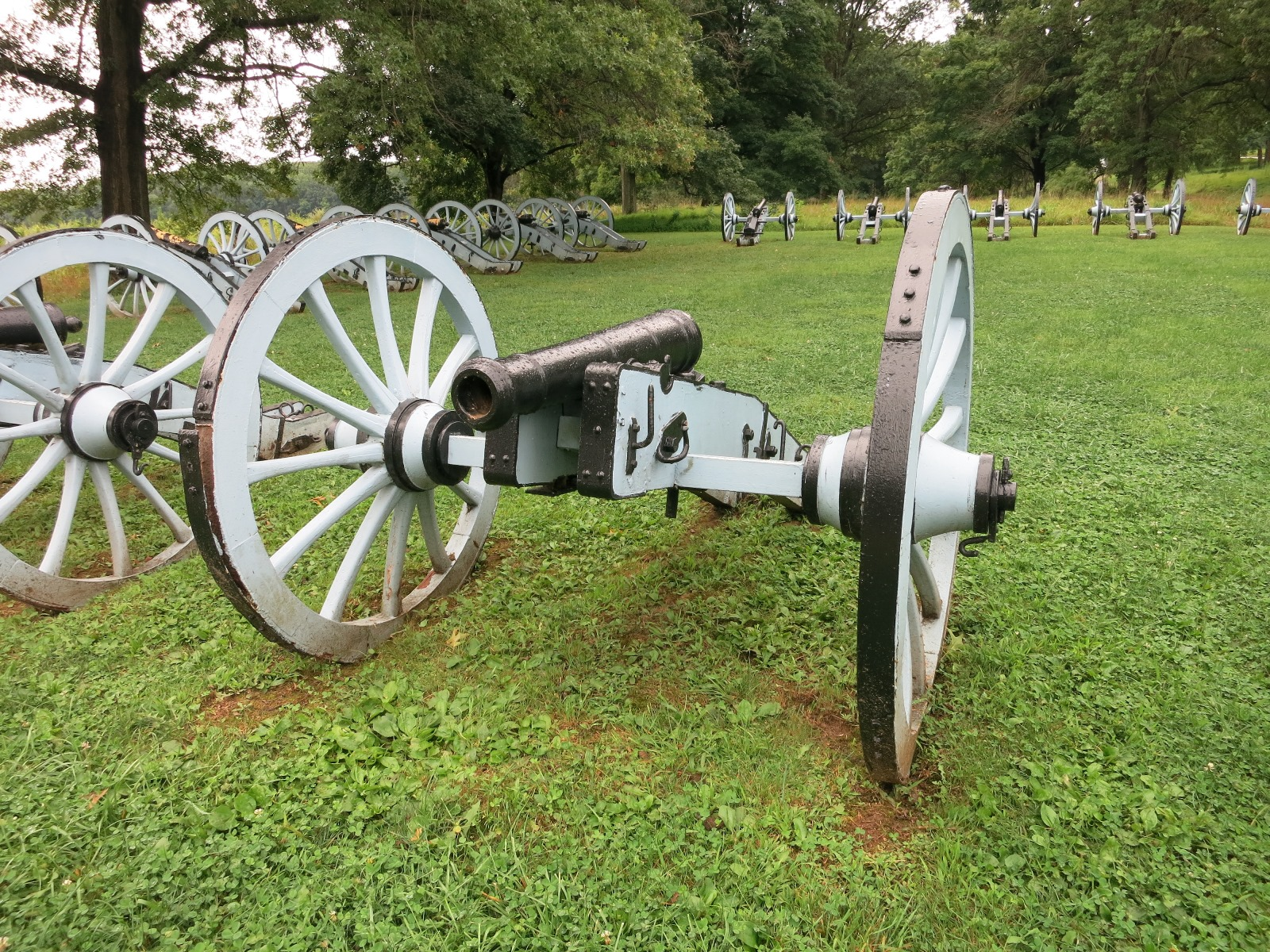
Replica cannons in the Artillery Park located east of the parking lot on East Inner Line Drive at Valley Forge National Park

== See also ==
- Freedoms Foundation at Valley Forge
- Kennedy Mansion (Valley Forge)
- List of National Historic Landmarks in Pennsylvania
