= Belmont =

Belmont may refer to:

== People ==
- Belmont (surname)

== Places ==
=== Antigua and Barbuda ===
- Belmont, Antigua and Barbuda

=== Australia ===
- Belmont, New South Wales, a suburb in the Hunter Region
- Belmont, Queensland, an outer suburb of Brisbane
  - Shire of Belmont, Queensland, a former local government area
  - Electoral district of Belmont (Queensland), a former state electorate in the Legislative Assembly of Queensland
- Belmont, Victoria, a southern suburb of Geelong
- Belmont, Western Australia, a suburb of Perth
  - City of Belmont, a Local Government Area in Western Australia, in the inner eastern suburbs of Perth
  - Electoral district of Belmont, a state electorate represented in the Western Australian Legislative Assembly

=== Canada ===
- Belmont, Edmonton, Alberta
- Belmont, Nova Scotia (disambiguation)
- Belmont, Ontario
- Belmont, Prince Edward Island
- Port Belmont (aka "Belmont"), British Columbia, a former mining community on Princess Royal Island
- Havelock-Belmont-Methuen, Ontario

=== France ===
- Belmont, Bas-Rhin
- Belmont, Doubs
- Belmont, Gers
- Belmont, Isère
- Belmont, Haute-Marne
- Belmont, Haute-Saône
- Belmont, Jura

=== Grenada ===
- Belmont, Grenada

=== Ireland ===
- Belmont, County Offaly

=== Israel ===
- Belmont Castle, a Crusader castle ruins near Suba, Jerusalem

=== Lithuania ===
- Belmontas, originally Belmont, a suburb of Vilnius

=== New Zealand ===
- Belmont, Auckland, a suburb of Auckland's North Shore
- Belmont, Wellington, a suburb of Lower Hutt

=== Saint Vincent and the Grenadines ===
- Belmont, Saint Vincent and the Grenadines

=== Switzerland ===
- Belmont Castle, Graubünden
- Belmont-sur-Lausanne, Vaud
- Belmont-sur-Yverdon, Vaud

=== Trinidad and Tobago ===
- Belmont, Port of Spain

=== United Kingdom ===
==== England ====
Settlements from north to south

- Belmont, County Durham, now part of Durham city
- Belmont, Lancashire
- Belmont, Northwich, Cheshire
- Belmont Rural, Herefordshire
- Belmont, Harrow, North London
  - Belmont (Harrow ward)
- Belmont, Sutton, South London
  - Belmont (Sutton ward), South London
- Belmont, East Sussex

Houses meeting notability criteria

- Belmont House and Gardens, a mansion in north Kent
- Belmont, Lyme Regis, a large house in south Dorset
- Belmont, East Barnet, demolished, in London
- Belmont Castle, demolished, in south Essex

Other notable articles

- Belmont transmitting station, Lincolnshire

==== Northern Ireland ====
- Belmont, Belfast, an electoral ward

==== Scotland ====
- Belmont, Ayr
- Belmont, Shetland

=== United States ===
==== Arkansas ====
- Belmont, Arkansas

==== California ====
- Belmont, California
- Neighborhoods in Long Beach:
  - Belmont Heights, Long Beach, California
  - Belmont Park, Long Beach, California
  - Belmont Shore, Long Beach, California

==== Georgia ====
- Belmont, Georgia

==== Illinois ====
- Belmont Avenue (Chicago)
- Belmont, Illinois
- Belmont Township, Iroquois County, Illinois

==== Indiana ====
- Belmont, Indiana

==== Kentucky ====
- Belmont, Bracken County, Kentucky
- Belmont, Bullitt County, Kentucky

==== Maine ====
- Belmont, Maine

==== Maryland ====
- Belmont (Chevy Chase, Maryland Subdivision)

==== Massachusetts ====
- Belmont, Massachusetts

==== Michigan ====
- Belmont, Michigan

==== Minnesota ====
- Belmont Township, Jackson County, Minnesota

==== Mississippi ====
- Belmont, Mississippi
- Belmont Plantation (Wayside, Mississippi)

==== Missouri ====
- Belmont, Missouri, site of the Civil War Battle of Belmont

==== Nebraska ====
- Belmont, Nebraska, a ghost town

==== Nevada ====
- Belmont, Nevada, a ghost town

==== New Hampshire ====
- Belmont, New Hampshire, a town
  - Belmont (CDP), New Hampshire, a village and census-designated place in the town

==== New York ====
- Belmont, New York, a village in Allegany County
- Belmont, Bronx, a neighborhood in New York City

==== North Carolina ====
- Belmont, North Carolina

==== Ohio ====
- Belmont, Ohio
- Belmont County, Ohio

==== Oregon ====
- Belmont, Portland, Oregon

==== Pennsylvania ====
- Belmont, Pennsylvania
- Belmont (Bensalem, Pennsylvania)
- Belmont District, Pennsylvania
- Belmont Mansion (Philadelphia)

==== Tennessee ====
- Belmont, Anderson County, Tennessee
- Belmont, Coffee County, Tennessee
- Belmont, Jefferson County, Tennessee
- Belmont Mansion (Tennessee)

==== Texas ====
- Belmont, Texas, in Gonzales County
- Belmont, Dallas

==== Vermont ====
- Belmont, Vermont

==== Virginia ====
- Belmont Plantation (Albemarle County, Virginia)
- Belmont (Capron, Virginia)
- Belmont (Charlottesville, Virginia)
- Belmont (Falmouth, Virginia), now known as Gari Melchers Home & Studio
- Belmont, Virginia, in Loudoun County
- Belmont, Montgomery County, Virginia
- Belmont, Roanoke, Virginia
- Belmont Manor House, Ashburn

==== Washington ====
- Belmont, Washington

==== West Virginia ====
- Belmont, West Virginia

==== Wisconsin ====
- Belmont, Wisconsin, a village in Lafayette County
- Belmont (town), Wisconsin, a town in Lafayette County
- Belmont, Portage County, Wisconsin, a town

=== Zimbabwe ===
- Belmont, Zimbabwe, site of Ingutsheni Hospital

=== Other places ===
- Belmont Abbey (disambiguation)
- Belmont Historic District (disambiguation)
- Belmont Hotel (disambiguation)
- Belmont Park (disambiguation)
- Belmont Plantation (disambiguation)
- Belmont railway station (disambiguation)
- Belmont Street (disambiguation)
- Belmont Township (disambiguation)

== Automobiles ==
- Belmont (automobile), an American electric car sold in 1916
- Holden Belmont, an Australian car sold from 1968 to 1974
- Vauxhall Belmont, a British car sold from 1986 to 1991

== Fiction ==
- Belmont, fictional Italian estate of the character Portia in the play The Merchant of Venice by William Shakespeare
- The Belmonts, a clan of vampire-hunting characters in the Japanese video game series Castlevania
- Brago and Sherry Belmont, characters in the Japanese manga series Zatch Bell!

== Music ==
- Belmont (band), an American pop punk band
- Belmont (album)
- Belmont Prize, a German music award
- The Belmonts, American doo-wop group

== Schools ==
- Belmont Abbey College, North Carolina, US
- Belmont Academy, Ayr, Scotland
- Belmont College, Ohio, US
- Belmont Elementary School, British Columbia, Canada
- Belmont Preparatory High School, New York, US
- Belmont Public Schools, Belmont, Massachusetts
- Belmont School (disambiguation), several schools
- Belmont Secondary School, British Columbia, Canada
- Belmont University, Tennessee, US

== Sport ==
- Belmont Stakes, a horse race
- Belmont Bombers, a junior ice hockey team in Belmont, Ontario, Canada
- Belmont Bruins, the sports teams of Belmont University in Nashville, Tennessee, US
- Belmont Shore RFC, a rugby union team in Long Beach, California, US

== Other uses ==
- Battle of Belmont (1899), during the Second Boer War
- Battle of Belmont (1861), during the American Civil War
- Belmont (cigarette), a Canadian brand
- Belmont Books, a publishing company
- The Belmont Cinema, an arthouse cinema in Aberdeen, Scotland
- Belmont Report, a medical ethics report
- Lake Macquarie Airport, formerly Belmont Airport
- Belmont transmitting station in Lincolnshire

== See also ==
- Balmont (disambiguation)
- Beaumont (disambiguation)
- Bellmont (disambiguation)
- Belmond (disambiguation)
- Belmonte (disambiguation)
- Earl of Bellomont
- Montebello (disambiguation)
- Schönberg (disambiguation) (German for "beautiful mountain")
