= Gilbert Mansion =

Historic house in Tennessee, United States

- U.S. National Register of Historic Places
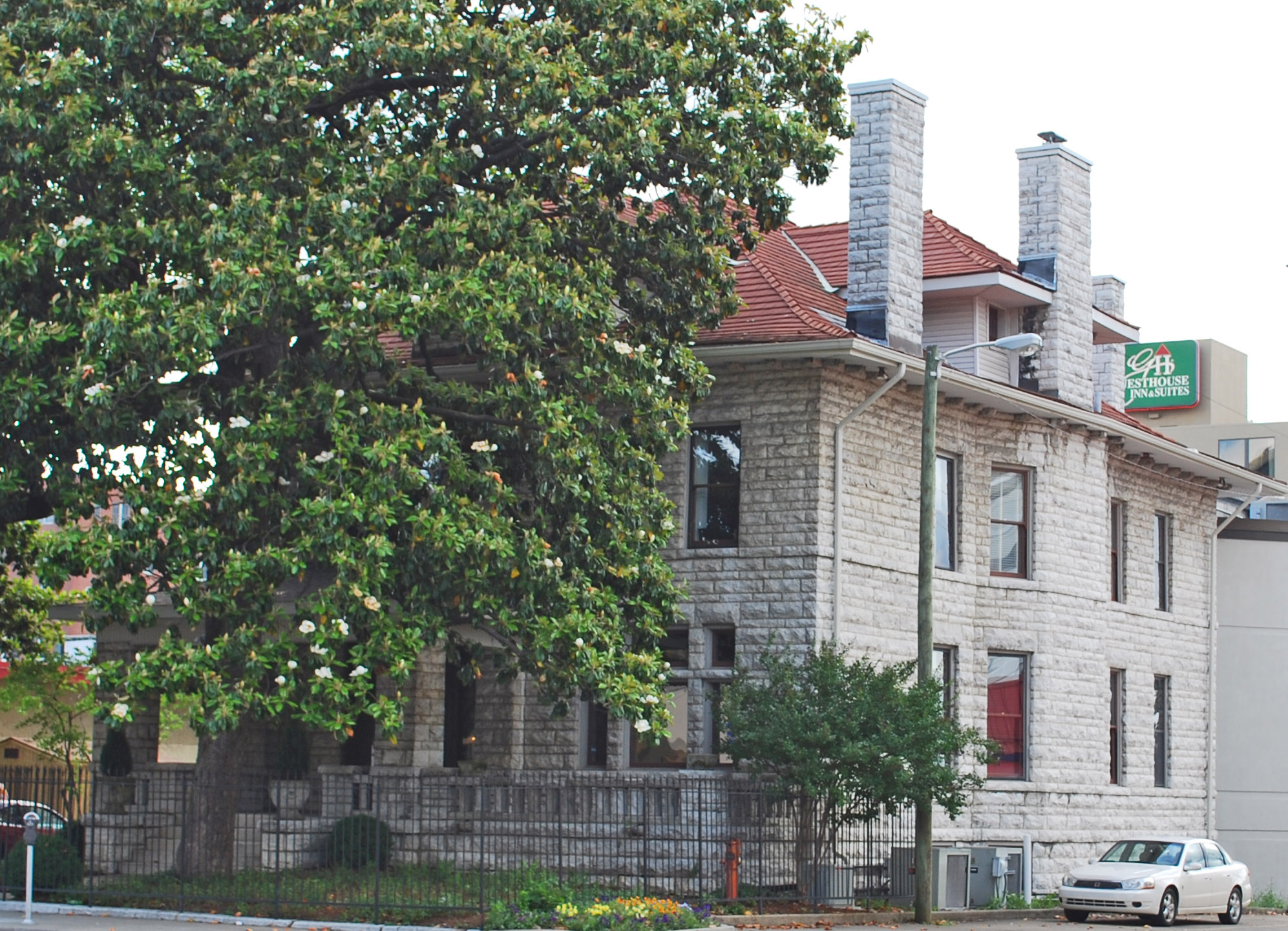
- The Gilbert Mansion in 2010

- Location within Tennessee
- Location: 1906 West End Avenue, Nashville, Tennessee
- Coordinates: 36°9′8″N 86°47′54″W
- Area: 0.2 acres (0.081 ha)
- Built: 1908
- Architectural style: Four Square
- NRHP reference No.: 79002423
- Added to NRHP: March 28, 1979

The Gilbert Mansion is a historic mansion in Nashville, Tennessee, U.S.. It was built for a Hungarian immigrant who founded Belcourt Theatre. It is listed on the National Register of Historic Places.

== History ==
The mansion was built in 1908 for Joseph Lightman. Lightman was a Jewish Hungarian immigrant who settled in Nashville in the 1880s and worked as a fruit merchant and construction contractor. He was the president of the Nashville Young Men's Hebrew Association in 1920–1921, and a member of the Cumberland Masonic lodge. In 1925, with his son Morris, Lightman opened Hillsboro Theater (later the Belcourt Theatre) in Hillsboro Village. His son founded Malco Theatres.

The house was purchased by Harris Gilbert, a clothing merchant, in 1911. After his death in 1935, it was subsequently inherited by his son, Leon Gilbert, a lawyer.

Stanley Dean Lindsey (1938-2014) and Elizabeth Lindsey were the owners of the house in 1979. Stanley was an engineer and started his structural engineering company Stanley D. Lindsey and Associates soon after earning his degrees. Lindsay renovated the house and added a modern structure to the rear that served as his firm's offices until he sold it and moved to Savannah, GA. The law firm of Riley & Jacobson, PLC has had its offices in the building since 1996.

== Architectural significance ==
The house was designed in the American Foursquare architectural style. It has been listed on the National Register of Historic Places since March 28, 1979.
