= Belmonte =

Belmonte may refer to:

== People and titles ==
=== Arts and entertainment ===
- Moses Belmonte (1619–1647), Dutch Jewish poet and translator
- Rene Belmonte (1971–2026), Brazilian screenwriter
- "Belmonte", protagonist of the Mozart opera Die Entführung aus dem Serail
- Belmonte (cartoonist), pseudonym of Benedito Carneiro Bastos Barreto

=== Sport ===
- Jason Belmonte (born 1983), Australian professional ten-pin bowler
- Juan Belmonte (1892–1962), Spanish bullfighter
- Mireia Belmonte García (born 1990), Spanish Olympic swimmer
- Nicola Belmonte (born 1987), Italian footballer

=== Other fields ===
- Prince of Belmonte or Princess Belmonte, a Spanish and Italian noble title
- Domenico Pignatelli di Belmonte (1730–1803), Cardinal of the Roman Catholic Church
- Gennaro Granito Pignatelli di Belmonte (1851–1948), Cardinal of the Roman Catholic Church
- Feliciano Belmonte Jr. (born 1936), Speaker of the House of Representatives of the Philippines from 2010 to 2016
- Kit Belmonte (born 1966), Filipino lawyer and politician, nephew of Feliciano, representative for Quezon City's 6th district from 2013 to 2022
- Joy Belmonte (born 1970), Filipino politician, daughter of Feliciano, and current mayor of Quezon City
- Wivina Belmonte, UNICEF staff member

== Places ==
=== Brazil ===
- Belmonte, Santa Catarina, a municipality in the State of Santa Catarina
- Belmonte, Bahia, a municipality in the State of Bahia

=== Iberia ===
- Belmonte, Cuenca, a municipality in the region of Cuenca, autonomous community of Castile-La Mancha
  - Castle of Belmonte (Cuenca)
- Belmonte de Campos, a municipality in the province of Palencia, autonomous community of Castile and León
- Belmonte de Gracián, a municipality in the province of Zaragoza, autonomous community of Aragon
- Belmonte de Miranda, a municipality in the autonomous community of the principality of Asturias
- Belmonte de San José, a municipality in the province of Teruel, autonomous community of Aragon
- Belmonte de Tajo, a municipality in the autonomous community of Madrid
- Belmonte, Portugal, a municipality in the district of Castelo Branco
  - Castle of Belmonte (Belmonte)

=== Italy ===
- Belmonte Calabro, a commune in the province of Cosenza, region of Calabria
- Belmonte Castello, a commune in the province of Frosinone, region of Lazio
- Belmonte del Sannio, a commune in the province of Isernia, region of Molise
- Belmonte in Sabina, a commune in the province of Rieti, region of Lazio
- Belmonte Mezzagno, a commune in the province of Palermo, region of Sicily
- Belmonte Piceno, a commune in the province of Fermo, region of Marche
- San Colombano Belmonte, a comune in the province of Turin, region of Piedmont

== Other uses ==
- Belmonte (film), a 2018 film
- Belmonte (rose)
- Belmonte (telenovela), a Portuguese telenovela which began in 2013
- Belmonte (cheese), an Italian variety of cheese

== See also ==
- Belmont (disambiguation)
- Beaumont (disambiguation)
- Bellmont (disambiguation)
- Delmonte
- Montebello (disambiguation)
- Schönberg (disambiguation)
