= Belmont Park (disambiguation) =

Belmont Park may refer to:

== Australia ==
- Belmont Park Racecourse, a thoroughbred horse racing track in Burswood, Western Australia
  - Belmont Park railway station, Perth, a closed train station near the Belmont Park Racecourse in Perth, Western Australia
- Belmont State Park, on Lake Macquarie in New South Wales

== Canada ==
- Belmont Park, Colwood, a neighbourhood of Colwood, British Columbia
- Belmont Park, Montreal, a defunct amusement park in Montreal, Quebec
- Belmont Provincial Park on Prince Edward Island

== New Zealand ==
- Belmont Regional Park in Hutt City

== United Kingdom ==
- Belmont Park, Exeter, a public park provided by Exeter City Council
- Belmont Park, Sutton, southernmost part of the Shanklin Estate

== United States ==
- Belmont Park, a thoroughbred horse race track in Elmont, New York
  - Belmont Park station, a Long Island Railroad stop at the race track
- Belmont Park (San Diego), an amusement park in San Diego, California
- Belmont Park, Long Beach, California, a neighborhood in Long Beach, California
- Belmont Lake State Park, a park in Babylon, Long Island, New York.

== See also ==
- Belmont (disambiguation)
