= Belmont High School =

Belmont High School may refer to

United States:

- Belmont High School (Los Angeles, California)
- Belmont High School (Massachusetts)
- Belmont High School (New Hampshire)
- Belmont High School (Ohio)
- Belmont High School (Wisconsin)
- Belmont Preparatory High School, The Bronx, New York City
- South Point High School (North Carolina) (formerly Belmont High School), Belmont, North Carolina

Australia:

- Belmont High School (Victoria)
- Belmont City College, Belmont, Western Australia (formerly Belmont Senior High School)

Canada:

- Belmont Secondary School (formerly Belmont High School), Langford, British Columbia

== See also ==
- Belmont School (disambiguation)
