= Belmont, WA =

Belmont, WA may refer to:

- Belmont, Washington, a community in the United States
- Belmont, Western Australia, a suburb of Perth in Australia
