= Rothmans, Benson & Hedges =

Canadian manufacturer and distributor of tobacco products

Rothmans, Benson & Hedges Inc.

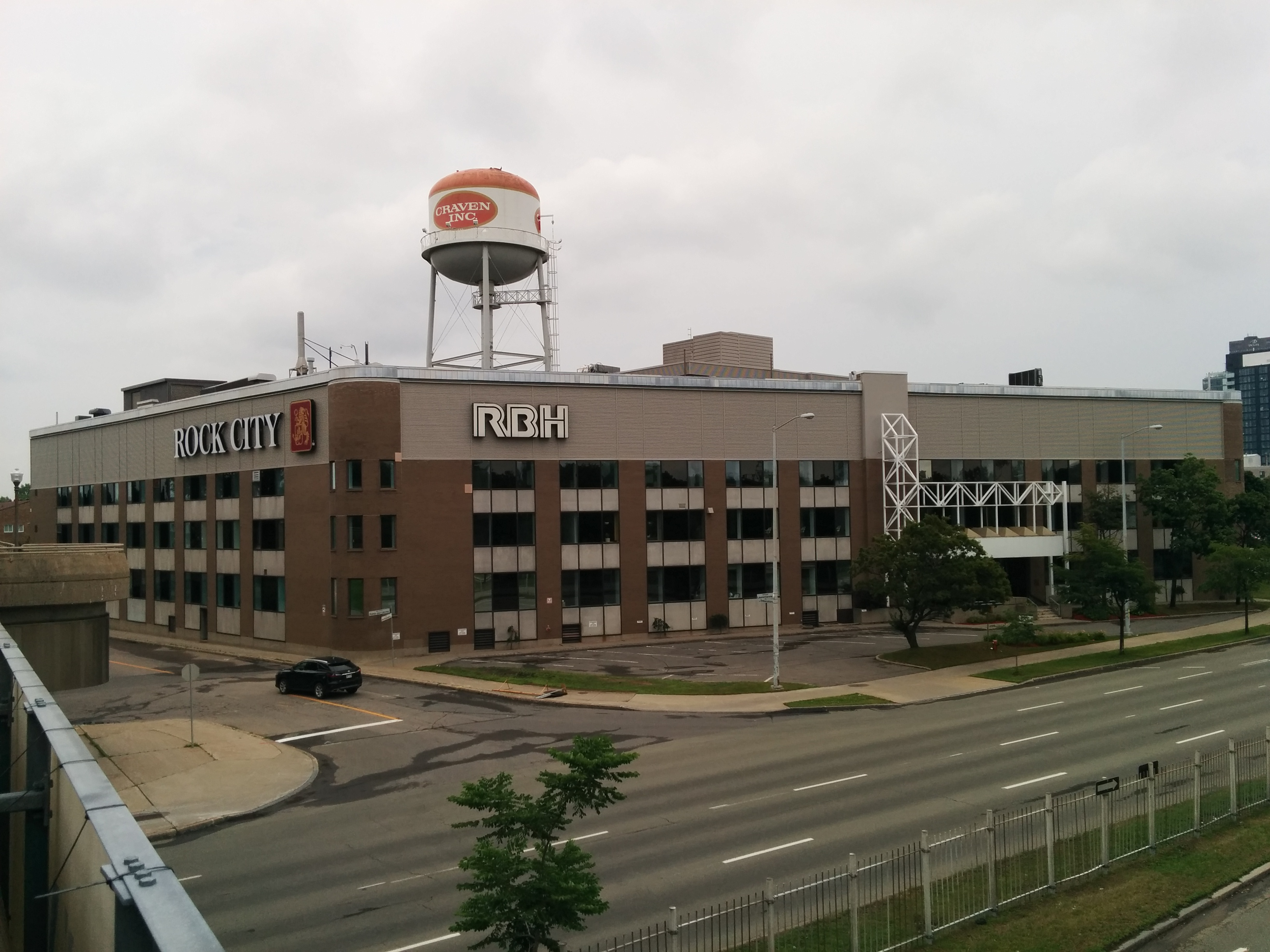
- RBH factory in Saint-Roch, Quebec City
- Company type: Subsidiary
- Industry: Tobacco
- Headquarters: Toronto, Canada
- Products: Cigarettes
- Parent: Philip Morris International
- Website: www.rbhinc.ca

Rothmans, Benson & Hedges Inc. (RBH) is a Canadian manufacturer and distributor of tobacco products. It was formed by the merger of the Canadian units of Rothmans International and the Benson & Hedges brand – owned by Philip Morris International.

== History ==
Rock City tobacco company of Quebec was founded in 1899 by Olivier-Napoléon Drouin and his brothers as well as a friend, Joseph Picard. The factory experienced prosperity from the 1910s, to the point of becoming one of the largest manufacturers of tobacco products in Canada, as well as having assets in Ontario and elsewhere in Quebec. The factory employed around 500 people, mostly women, and had about twenty sales representatives throughout Canada. Eventually, Rock City struggled and British Carreras Tobacco Company purchased it in 1936. Carreras in turn was bought out by Rothmans International in 1963.

When British American Tobacco bought Rothmans in 1999, it spun off its 60% share of Rothmans, Benson & Hedges as a separate public company. In 2008, the remaining 60% of RBH was acquired by Philip Morris International (PMI), which had controlled 40% of the firm, for US$ 2,000 million, making PMI the sole owner of the company. At the time, RBH was the second-largest cigarette maker in Canada. The acquisition by PMI was targeted to Rothmans Inc, which was a holding company for RBH.

== Brands ==
RBH owns or otherwise controls a wide variety of cigarette brands. Some of these are listed and expanded upon below:

- Accord: A discount/value brand. Brand variants offered are Red, Blue, and Green (Menthol).
- Belmont: Another flagship brand, offered as King Size, Regulars, and Compact King Size (Belmont Edge (Micro in Quebec)).
- Belvedere: A premium cigarette brand, offered in both regular and king size. Belvedere-branded empty cigarette tubes and rolling tobacco are also available for purchase.
- Benson & Hedges: The company's flagship brand offered in three formats: King Size (Black, Gold, Silver), 100s (Regular, Sterling and DeLuxe, with a menthol version) and Superslims (Black, White, and Menthol).
- Canadian Classics: A mid-tier brand. This brand is known as Québec Classique in Quebec.
- Craven A: This brand is a part of the RBH "premium brand strategy", principally within the Canadian market. In 2004, Rothmans' reported that the brand had experienced "long-term declines in market share", which was exacerbated by the elimination of all sponsorship activities in Canada in October 2003. The brand has been closely associated with a number of entertainment events in Canada. Among these has been the "Just for Laughs" Canadian Comedy Tour in March 1999.
- Davidoff: As of April 2007, RBH has started importing Davidoff cigarettes for the Canadian and Australian markets. The package does, however, state that they are still made in Germany, unlike some international cigarettes sold in Canada, which are made only in Canada.
- Mark Ten: A low mid-tier brand offered in Quebec and Atlantic Canada.
- Next: A budget brand.
- Number 7: Low end brand.
- Philip Morris: A budget brand
- Rothmans: The company's other flagship brand.

== Lawsuits ==
Rothmans has been involved in a number of lawsuits in Canada. In a key suit which commenced in 2006, Rothmans was criminally prosecuted for fraud and conspiracy for supporting the smuggling of cigarettes on the black market in the early 1990s. The allegation was that Rothmans encouraged smuggling in order to be able to convince Canadian governments to reduce cigarette taxes and thereby discourage that very smuggling. Rothmans pleaded guilty to the charges in 2008 and agreed to pay a fine of C$100 million, and C$450 million in payments for a decade after the initial fine.
