= Belmont District =

Belmont District may refer to:

- Belmont District, Pennsylvania, a defunct district that existed briefly in Philadelphia County, Pennsylvania
- Belmont Historic District (disambiguation), several places in the United States
- Belmont, a neighborhood in Portland, Oregon, United States
