= Henry Underwood =

Henry Underwood may refer to:

- Henry Underwood (politician) (1863–1945), Australian politician
- Henry Underwood (architect, born 1787) (1787–1868), English architect in Cheltenham and Bath
- Henry Jones Underwood (1804–1852), English architect in Oxford

== See also ==
- Harry Underwood (born 1969), American painter
