= Hillsboro Village =

Neighborhood in Nashville, Tennessee

- Unincorporated community
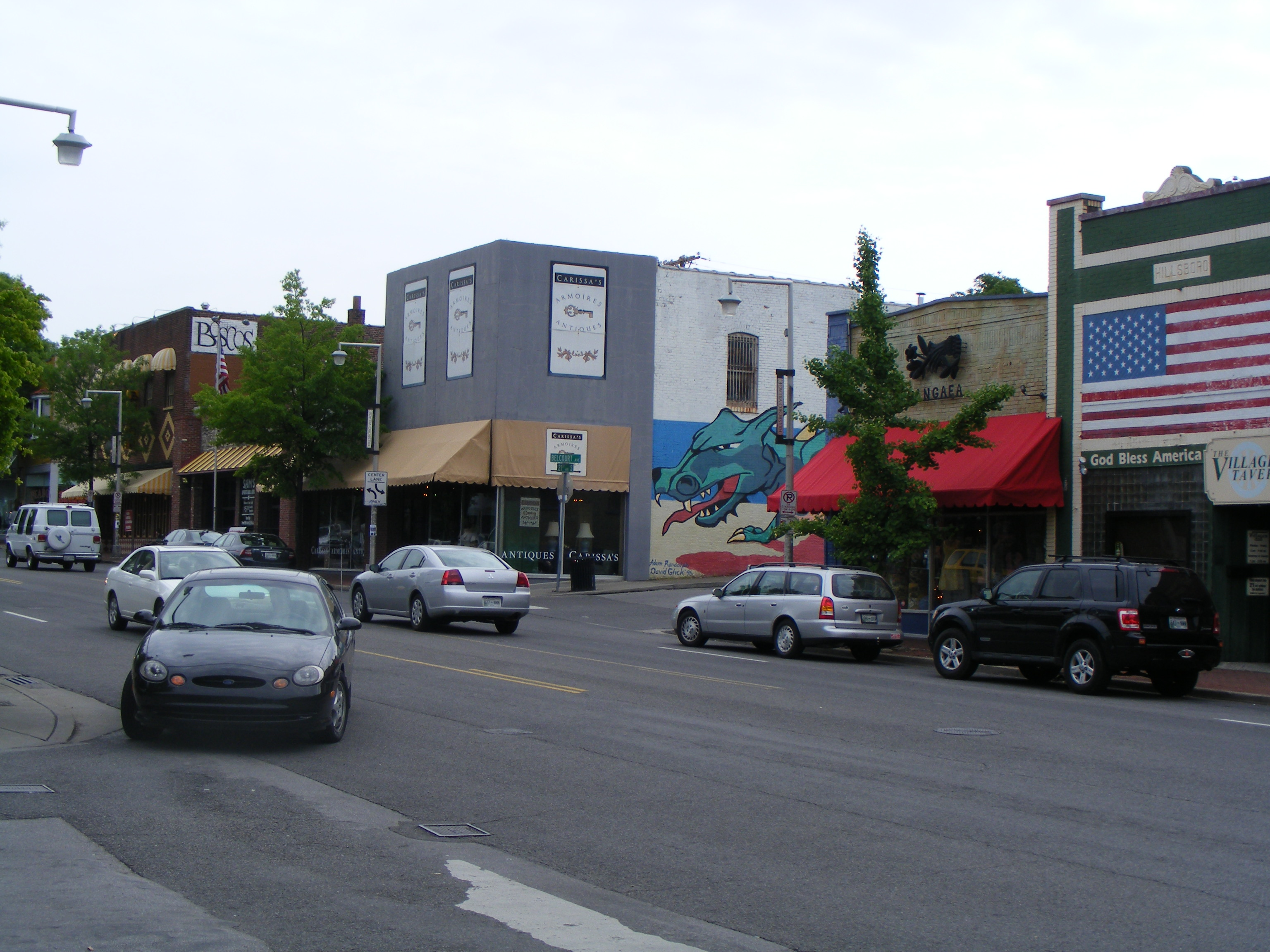
- Some of the stores in Hillsboro Village

- Location within Tennessee Location within the United States
- Coordinates: 36°08′00″N 86°48′05″W
- Country: United States
- State: Tennessee
- County: Davidson
- Time zone: UTC-6 (CST)
  - Summer (DST): UTC-5 (CDT)
- Zip code: 37212
- Area codes: 615, 629

Hillsboro Village is a neighborhood of Nashville, Tennessee, located 3 miles southwest of downtown. Hillsboro Village is governed by the Metropolitan Council of Nashville and Davidson County, because the government of Davidson County is consolidated with that of Nashville.

The center of Hillsboro Village is located along Hillsboro Road, a major thoroughfare dating from before the Civil War. It is a former streetcar suburb, and shopping and entertainment district, containing boutiques, the non-profit Belcourt Theatre, and numerous independent restaurants. The heart of Hillsboro Village is home to the Acklen Avenue Post Office, noted for its wall of autographed photos of country music stars. It is also home to local musicians Ben Folds and Mat Kearney. Hillsboro Village is adjacent to Vanderbilt University School of Medicine and close to Belmont University, and Music Row. The village is popular with college students. Hillsboro Road also divides the area into two neighborhoods: Hillsboro-West End to the West and Belmont-Hillsboro to the East.

Through the 19th century, the neighborhood now known as Hillsboro-Belmont was then part of a single estate containing the Belmont Mansion. Much of the land between Hillsboro Pike and Granny White Pike was farmland during this time. Hillsboro Village began to take shape in 1920, when two groceries and a pharmacy opened alongside the trolley line that ran down Hillsboro Road (21st Avenue). Residential houses were primarily built between 1910 and 1940.

== Architecture ==
The Acklen Estate was established by Joseph and Adelicia Acklen and originally consisted of the Belmont Mansion built in an Italian architectural style (built in 1853,) a zoo, a greenhouse, and grounds that were all open to the public. This space helped remedy the fact that there were no public parks in the area at the time. Residential development in the area began in 1890 after the sale of the Acklen Estate. In the same year, the Belmont Mansion became the central building of Belmont University.

In 1865, Roger Williams University was founded. Its campus ran from the stream south towards Belmont Avenue. The most notable building on campus was the Social-Religious Building, constructed in 1920 on 20th Ave South, which was later renamed the Wyatt Center when the university was acquired by Peabody College and then Vanderbilt University. The building is visible from blocks away and is easily recognizable by its columned exterior and its large domed roof. The majority of the developments that followed were dormitories and homes surrounding Vanderbilt University.

== See also ==
- Belmont–Hillsboro Historic District
