= Nashville Children's Theatre =

American professional children's theatre company

Nashville Children's Theater
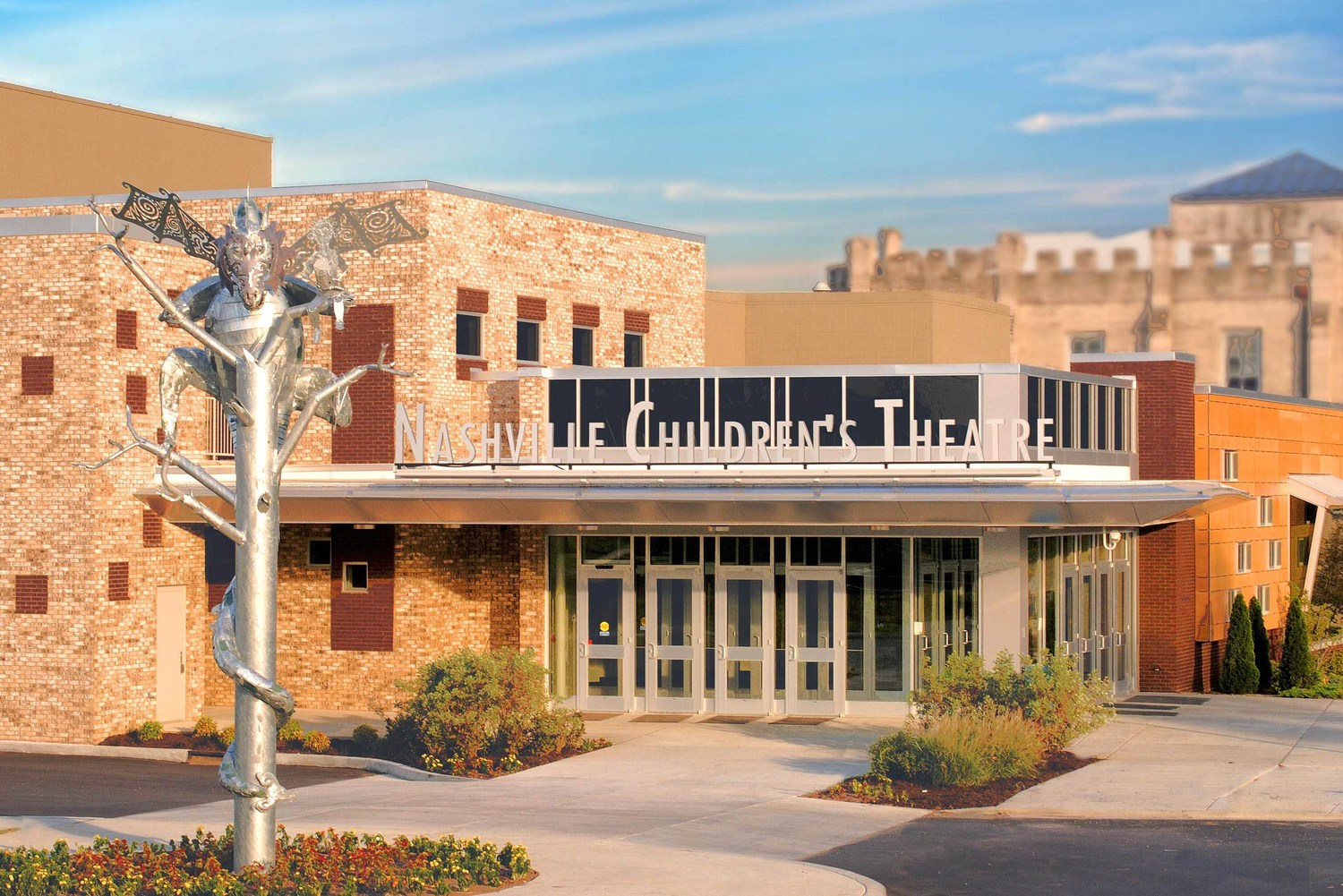
- Interactive map of Nashville Children's Theater
- Location: 25 Middleton St., Nashville
- Coordinates: 36°09′17″N 86°46′05″W
- Type: State Theater

Construction
- Opened: 1931

Website
- nashvillechildrenstheatre.org

Nashville Children's Theatre (NCT) is one of the oldest continually operating professional children's theatre company in America. It is a member of the Theatre for Young Audiences, the ASSITEJ, and is affiliated with the Actors' Equity Association.

== History ==
NCT was established in 1931 by the Junior League of Nashville. Originally called The Nashville Academy Theatre, it opened with the production of "Aladdin and His Wonderful Lamp." NCT has performed at Belcourt Theatre, Vanderbilt University and Belmont University.

=== Leadership and legacy ===
NCT's legacy includes the profound impact of Scot Copeland, who served as producing artistic director for 30 years until his sudden passing in 2016. Under his leadership, NCT produced nearly 180 plays and achieved national acclaim, including being named one of the top five children's theatres in the U.S. by Time in 2004. Copeland was celebrated for his artistic vision, nurturing of young talent, and dedication to creating meaningful theatrical experiences for young audiences. His work culminated in notable achievements like the world premiere of Jack’s Tale: A Mythic Mountain Musical Adventure in collaboration with the Kennedy Center for the Performing Arts.

Following Copeland's passing, Ernie Nolan was artistic director of the theatre from 2017-2024, at which time Jen Houghton assumed the position.

== Awards ==
Award/Recognition	Organization	Year
Five Best Children's Theatre Companies in the U.S.	TIME Magazine	2004
2009 - No. 1 Performing Arts Organization - Ranked by number of performances	Nashville Business Journal	2009
Four of NCT's 2009 Productions were ranked in NBJ's 2009 Top 25 Musical Theater/events	Nashville Business Journal	2009
Best Local Theater Company	Nashville Scene	2010
Best Live Performance	Nashville Parent	2010
Ranked #2 Performing Arts Organization in Nashville by total attendance	Nashville Business Journal	2013
Ranked #4 & #5 Top Attended Music/Theatre events in Nashville	Nashville Business Journal	2013
Ranked # 2 Performing Arts Organization based on attendance totals	Nashville Business Journal	2014
Ranked #2 Performing Arts Organization based on attendance totals	Nashville Business Journal	2015
Arts & Culture 12th Awards Winner	12th & Broad	2016
Best Local Theatre Company	The Tennessean's Toast of Music City	2015
Ranked #3 Performing Arts Organization based on attendance totals	Nashville Business Journal	2016
Ranked #1 & #2 Top Attended Performing Arts Events in Nashville	Nashville Business Journal	2016
Ranked Top Ten Entertainment and Performance Venues in Nashville based on attendance totals	Nashville Business Journal	2016
Best Professional Theatre	Broadway World Nashville	2018
Theaterati of the Year - Ernie Nolan	Midwinter's First Night	2018

== Affiliations ==
Affiliation	Year
ANE (Association of Nonprofit Executives)	2001
ASSITEJ International (International Assn of Theatre for Children and Young People)	1964
Center for Nonprofit Management Excellence Network	1999
Actors' Equity Association	1998
Nashville Chamber of Commerce	1996
Association of Junior Leagues International	1931
Nashville Arts Coalition	1994
Nashville Area Association for Young Children (NAAYC)	2006
Metro Arts Commission	1989
Association of Fundraising Professionals - Member	2008
Nashville Area Chamber of Commerce	2004
Tennesseans for the Arts	1990
The National Association for Professional Theatres for Young Audiences (TYA/USA)	1990
Hands On Network	2007
