= Belmont railway station =

Belmont railway station or Belmont Station may refer to:

== Railway stations ==
=== Australia ===
- Belmont railway station, New South Wales
- Redcliffe railway station in Perth, formerly proposed to be called Belmont railway station
- Belmont railway station, Perth, terminus of the former Belmont railway line
- Belmont Park railway station, Perth, Western Australia

=== New Zealand ===
- Belmont Railway Station, New Zealand

=== Switzerland ===
- Belmont-sur-Montreux railway station

=== United Kingdom ===
- Belmont railway station (Harrow), England
- Belmont railway station (Sutton), England
- Belmont Junction railway station (Durham), England

=== United States ===
- Belmont station (Caltrain), Belmont, California
- Belmont station (CTA Blue Line), Chicago, Illinois
- Belmont station (CTA North Side Main Line), Chicago, Illinois
- Belmont station (Metra), Downers Grove, Illinois
- Belmont Avenue/Franklin Park station, Franklin Park, Illinois
- Belmont Center station, Belmont, Massachusetts
- Belmont Park station, Queens, New York

== Other uses ==
- Belmont Station, New South Wales, a pastoral lease in Australia
- Belmont transmitting station, Lincolnshire, England

== See also ==
- Belmont (disambiguation)
