= Belmont Hotel =

Belmont Hotel or Bellmont Hotel may refer to:

- Belmont Hotel (Missoula, Montana), listed on the NRHP in Montana
- Belmont Hotel (Belmont, New York), listed on the NRHP in New York
- Belmont Hotel (New York City)
- Belmont Plaza Hotel, New York City
- Belmont Hotel (Madison, Wisconsin), listed on the NRHP in Wisconsin
- Belmont Hotel (Pardeeville, Wisconsin), listed on the NRHP in Wisconsin
