= Belmont Street =

Belmont Street may refer to:

- Belmont Street, Aberdeen
- Belmont Street (Montreal)
- Belmont Street (EP), a play

== See also ==
- Belmont Avenue in Chicago
- Belmont (disambiguation)
