= Bellemont =

Bellemont may refer to:

- Bellemont, Arizona
- Bellemont, North Carolina
- Bellemont, Oklahoma
- Bellemont, Pennsylvania

== See also ==
- Bellemonte
