= Canadian Classics =

Canadian cigarette brand

- Product type: Cigarette
- Current owner: Philip Morris International
- Produced by: Rothmans, Benson & Hedges
- Country: Canada
- Introduced: 1995; 31 years ago
- Markets: Canada, Armenia

Canadian Classics is a Canadian brand of cigarettes, currently owned by Philip Morris International, and manufactured by its subsidiary Rothmans, Benson & Hedges

== History ==
Canadian Classics were launched in 1995 as a sports-oriented, wilderness-party style cigarette, and the cigarettes were originally made in filtered and light varieties, in regular (75 mm) and king size (85 mm).

In the 2000s, an extra light variant was introduced, now known as White. Today, Canadian Classics are sold as a value brand.

Within the first three years of introduction, Canadian Classics managed to gain a near 0.2% market share in Canada.

Various promotional material was created for this brand, including matches in 1995 and 1999, promotional posters for the brand in 1996, promotional posters for wild-water rafting races sponsored by Canadian Classics in 1997 and promotional posters for bars to promote the cigarettes through Billiard in 1999.

== Packaging ==
The top of the pack features either a text or picture warning in English or French, while the rest of the pack is left to the original manufacturer of the brand. It features the words "Canadian Classics", a moose, the name of the manufacturer, the quantity of cigarettes in the pack (20 or 25 per pack) in both English and French, and various landscapes in the background. The old designs also featured the words "Additive free", but those have been removed after claims by the Physicians for a Smoke-Free Canada organisation. The lights (now known as Silver) were unique in that they originally featured various rotating scenes of nature as their pack designs.

As of November 2019, Canada introduced plain packaging for cigarette brands by removing all logos and designs. Packages are now brown with only warning labels and the brand name in small font.

== Controversy ==
In 1995, Physicians for a Smoke-Free Canada protested against the decision of Rothmans, Benson & Hedges to portray the words "Additive free" and "Additive free blend" on their cigarette packs by claiming that "Section 9 (2) of the Tobacco Products Control Act (TPCA) banned the use of extraneous information on the cigarette package. Only trademarked information was allowed". RBH responded to the criticisms by saying that by trademarking the slogans "Additive-Free" and "100% Canadian Tobacco Without Additives," the TPCA's provisions did not apply. The TPCA was in force in April 1995 when Canadian Classics was launched, but was overturned by the Supreme Court of Canada in September 1995. In the same year, Synthia Callard, which was the new executive director of Physicians for a Smoke-Free Canada at the time, entered a team for a white-water rafting race sponsored by Canadian Classics Adventures Inc. Callard and her five teammates wore T-shirts saying "Smoke Screen Team" with a picture of a broken cigarette and the message "Promote Health Not Tobacco". Even though the shirts would have been covered by life jackets, event organisers disqualified the team to ensure the race was "Safe, professional and fun."

In 1997, the organisation protested once again after RBH put a celebrity endorsement from master tobacco blender Douglas Kilpatrick ("Only the finest Canadian tobacco") on the packs. The organisation criticised the move, saying that the 1997 Tobacco Act bans the use of testimonials "however displayed or communicated" (Section 21(1)). RBH has not provided an explanation for why this testimonial is not in contravention of the Tobacco Act.

In 2015, the Canadian Cancer Society warned that the use of so-called "click" cigarettes (which contain a capsule of menthol in the ball that is clicked to release) could attract youngsters to pick up smoking, effectively increasing youth smoking.

In the same year, with the bans of menthol cigarettes in Nova Scotia in June 2015 and Alberta in September 2015, Global Tobacco Control warned that RBH was still selling menthol-like cigarettes in the two provinces with the same characteristics, but calling them "green" instead of "menthol".

In 2016, RBH introduced some limited edition packs for Canada Day, which sparked outrage from various anti-tobacco movements in Canada, such as the Canadian Cancer Society and Physicians for a Smoke-Free Canada. It is speculated that RBH uses the limited edition packaging as an advertising vehicle before the introduction of plain packaging in the future.

== Sport sponsorship ==
Canadian Classic sponsored various white-water rafting events in the mid- to late 1990s.

== Products ==
- Canadian Classics Original
- Canadian Classics Silver
- Canadian Classics White
- Canadian Classics Crush (menthol capsule)
- Canadian Classics Smooth
- Canadian Classics Rich
- Canadian Classics Light

Not all varieties are available in all provinces. For instance, Smooth can be purchased readily in Alberta but not in Ontario. This may have to do with provincial regulations regarding cigarette descriptors.
