= Belcourt Theatre =

Movie theater in Nashville, Tennessee

Coordinates: 36°8′13″N 86°48′5″W

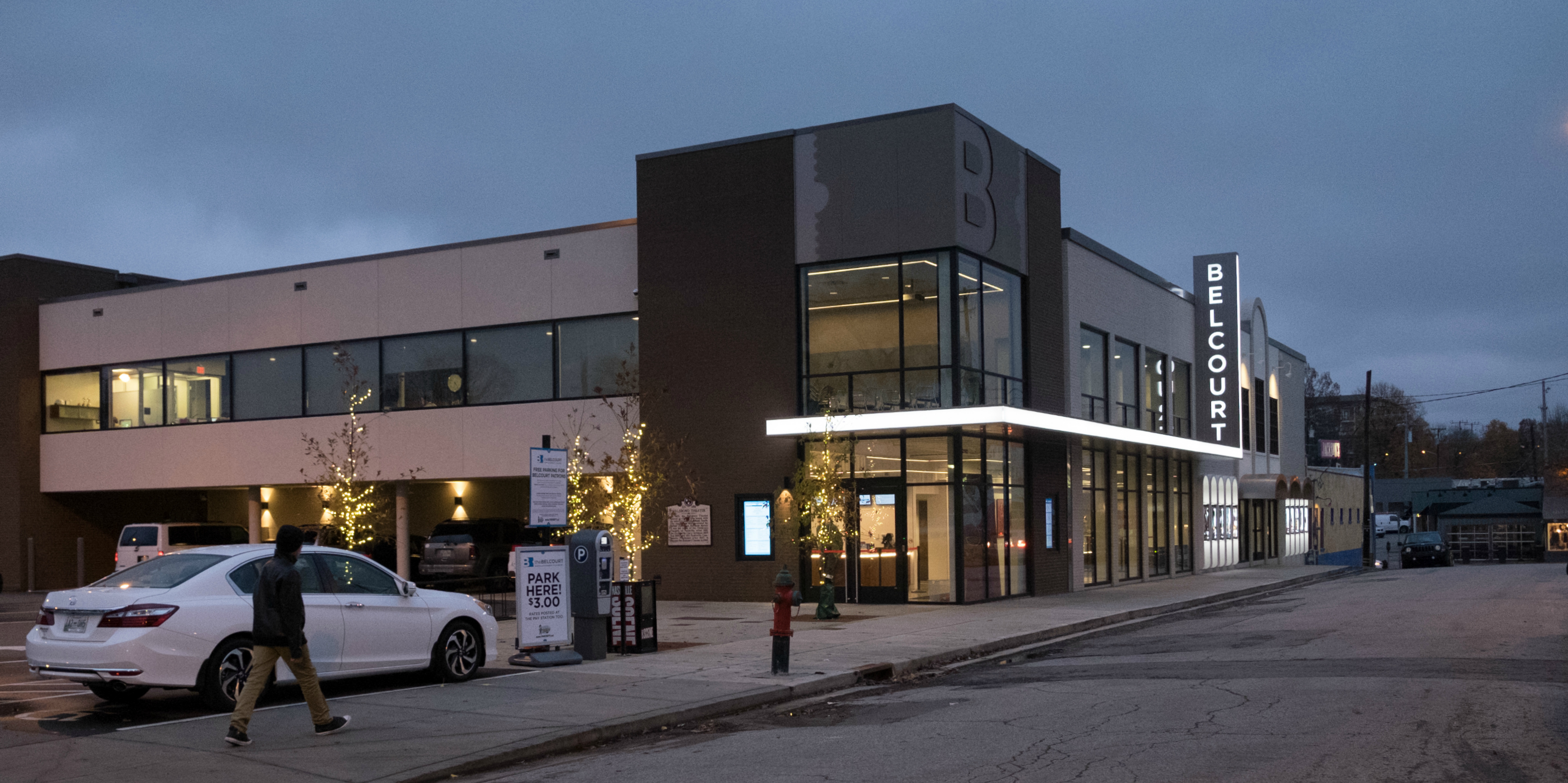
- Belcourt Theatre in 2016
- Interactive map of Belcourt Theatre
- Address: 2102 Belcourt Avenue; Nashville, Tennessee; United States

Construction
- Opened: 1925

Website
- http://www.belcourt.org

The Belcourt Theatre is a nonprofit film center located in Nashville's Hillsboro Village district.

== History ==
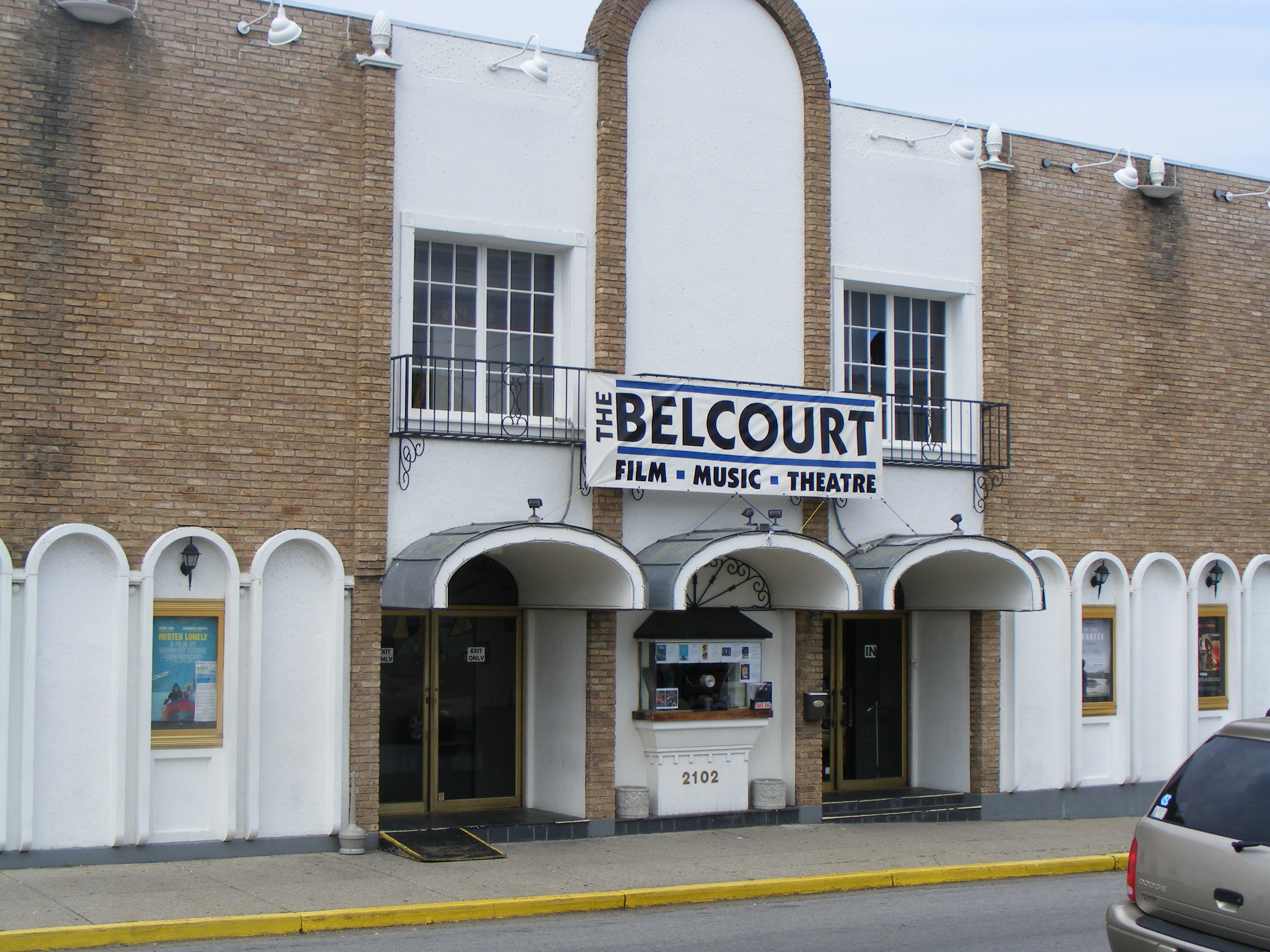
Belcourt Theatre in 2008

The theater was opened in 1925 as the Hillsboro Theatre by M.A. Lightman Sr. of Malco Theatres and his father Joseph Lightman. It was a silent movie house, boasting the most modern projection equipment and the largest stage in the city. The first film shown was America by D. W. Griffith.

As the community grew, the Belcourt adapted to the new needs of the neighborhood by providing a regular home for two highly successful performance groups. Nashville Children's Theatre, the longest running children's theatre of its kind, and the venerable Grand Ole Opry both shared the Belcourt stage during the 1930s. The Opry's tenure from 1934 to 1936 shaped the format the radio show still uses today. Due to the intimate size of the room, the Opry began playing each show to two separate audiences. Performers found themselves playing two 15-minute performances rather than the single half-hour performance to which they were accustomed.

In November 2007, the theatre was purchased by a nonprofit coalition of local arts activists (operating as "Belcourt Theatre Inc.") for $1.4 million.

In September 2015, the Belcourt Campaign was announced to renovate the theatre. On December 24 of that same year, the theatre was closed for renovation, and it reopened on July 22, 2016.

== Today ==
Its programming spans first-run (new releases) independent and documentary films (both U.S.-made and international) and repertory classics. Its concession stand includes classic movie snacks, locally made baked goods and items like tamales and empanadas, and a full bar (including wine on tap and local craft/draft beers). The Belcourt also has an active education and engagement program, sharing films with young people throughout Middle Tennessee via its Mobile Movie Theatre and frequently hosting post-screening discussions with filmmakers, issue experts, and other special guests. The Belcourt reopened in July 2016 after undergoing seven months of renovations. The renovation increased the theatre's square-footage to include a new small screening room, classroom space for film education and outreach, an elevator, and larger fully accessible restrooms.

The Belcourt is currently home to one of the largest paintings by noted painter Harry Underwood. The 4'x6' painting, Landmark Preservation, is a commentary on the uncertainty created when rapidly developing cities start to demolish historical buildings in order to make room for new construction.
