= Bellmon =

Bellmon is a surname. Notable people with the surname include:

- Anthony A. Bellmon (born 1990), American politician in Pennsylvania
- Henry Bellmon (1921–2009), American governor of Oklahoma
- Shirley Osborn Bellmon (1927 - 2000), American businesswoman

== See also ==
- Bellmont
