= Balmont =

Balmont may refer to:

- Balmont, former French commune since absorbed into Seynod
- Balmont, populated place in the French commune of Reyrieux
- Boris Balmont (1927–2022), Russian politician
- Florent Balmont (born 1980), French footballer
- Konstantin Balmont (1867–1942), Russian poet
- Balmont (horse), Thoroughbred racehorse

== See also ==
- Belmont (disambiguation)
