= Belmont School =

Belmont School may refer to:

in Australia

- Belmont High School (Victoria), Australia
- Belmont City College, a state secondary school in Perth, Western Australia.

in Canada

- Belmont Elementary School (Langley, British Columbia), a bilingual public elementary school in Langley, British Columbia, Canada
- Belmont Secondary School, located in Langford, British Columbia, Canada

in New Zealand

- Belmont Intermediate School, located in Belmont, North Shore City, Auckland, New Zealand

in the United Kingdom

- Belmont, the preparatory school of the Mill Hill School Foundation
- Belmont High School, Private School for boys aged 11-16 Rawtenstall, England
- Belmont Academy, the largest secondary school in Ayr, and the 6th largest in Scotland
- Belmont House School, Glasgow, United Kingdom
- Belmont Community School, a comprehensive school in Belmont, County Durham, England
- Belmont School (Surrey), a co-educational independent school in Holmbury St. Mary, near Dorking, Surrey

in the United States

- Belmont High School (Los Angeles, California), United States
- Belmont High School (Belmont, Massachusetts), United States
- Belmont High School (Belmont, Mississippi), United States
- Belmont Hill School, located in Belmont, a suburb of Boston, Massachusetts, United States
- Belmont High School (New Hampshire), United States
- Belmont Preparatory High School, The Bronx, New York City, New York United States
- Belmont Middle School, a public middle school in the Gaston County Schools school district located in Belmont, North Carolina, United States
- Belmont High School (Ohio), United States
- Belmont School (Philadelphia, Pennsylvania), listed on the National Register of Historic Places in west Philadelphia
- Belmont High School (Belmont, Wisconsin), United States

== Other uses ==
- Belmont - Redwood Shores School District, a school district in California, United States that serves the Belmont and Redwood Shores areas
- Belmont Elementary School District, a school district in California, United States
- Belmont Public Schools, a school district that serves Belmont, Massachusetts, United States

== See also ==
- Belmont (disambiguation)
- Bellmont High School, a public high school in Decatur, Indiana, United States
