= Bellmont =

Bellmont may refer to:

- Bellmont, Illinois, United States
- Bellmont, New York, United States
- Bellmont High School, Decatur, Indiana

== See also ==
- Belmont (disambiguation)
- Bellemont (disambiguation)
- Bellmon
