= Belmont Plantation =

Belmont Plantation may refer to:

- Any one of several Belmont Plantations in Louisiana
- Belmont Manor House, also known as Belmont Plantation, in Loudoun County, Virginia
- Belmont Plantation (Wayside, Mississippi)
- Belmont Plantation (Albemarle County, Virginia), north of Shadwell, Virginia

== See also ==
- Belmont (disambiguation)
