= Belmont (surname) =

Belmont is a surname. Notable people with the surname include:

- Alva Belmont (1853–1933), American socialite and suffrage supporter
- Andy Belmont (born 1957), American stock car racer
- August Belmont (1813–1890), American businessman and diplomat
- August Belmont Jr. (1853–1924), American financier and thoroughbred racing enthusiast
- Charles-François de Machault de Belmont (1640–1709), French naval officer, governor general of the French Antilles
- Eduardo Belmont Anderson (born c. 1945), Peruvian billionaire businessman
- François Vachon de Belmont (1645–1732), Roman Catholic bishop
- Joe Belmont, American basketball player and coach
- Joe Belmont (bird impressionist) (1876–1949), stage name of American bird impressionist and singer
- Joseph Belmont (1947–2022), Seychellois politician
- Lara Belmont (born 1980), British actress
- Oliver Belmont (1858–1908), American congressman
- Perry Belmont (1851–1947), American politician and diplomat
- Ricardo Belmont, Peruvian TV network owner and politician
- Robert Belmont (1892–1953), French politician
- Veronica Belmont (born 1982), podcast host and producer

Fictional characters:

- The Belmont family of vampire hunters from the Castlevania series of games which include: Leon, Trevor, Rose, Christopher, Simon, Richter, Sonia, Juste, Julius, Victor and Gabriel.
- Jules Belmont, fictional character from soap opera River City
- Shelley Belmont, fictional character from soap opera River City
