= Belmont, Montgomery County, Virginia =

Unincorporated community in Virginia, US

Coordinates: 37°09′46″N 80°26′49″W

Belmont is an unincorporated community along Virginia State Route 114 in western Montgomery County, Virginia, United States. Belmont is derived from the French meaning "beautiful mount".
