= Belmont (automobile) =

Defunct American motor vehicle manufacturer

- Industry: Automobiles
- Founded: 1916
- Defunct: 1916
- Headquarters: Wyandotte, Michigan
- Key people: J. H. Bishop
- Products: Electric cars and trucks

The Belmont was an electric car manufactured in Wyandotte, Michigan, by the Belmont Electric Auto Company in 1916. They produced four- and six-seater electrical limousines, along with other commercial electric vehicles.

In early 1916 it was announced that the Belmont Electric Auto Company would be formed to manufacture electric cars. The president was J. H. Bishop a man described as a "capitalist of Wyandotte" Temporary offices were at 410 Scherer Building in Detroit. The company would produce various models. A delivery car would be the most affordable at $985, a four passenger car for $1400, and a six passenger limousine for $1600. Range was up to 75 miles per charge. A feature on Belmont's was a charger that could be installed directly to the car so that the driver did not need to go to a garage to charge. The feature cost $150.

First year production was planned to be limited. Total production for the first year was expected to be under 250 cars and the company would adjust as needed. Production was expected to be at the Murphy Machine Shop on Biddle Avenue in Wyandotte. There is little evidence that any cars were ever made.
