= Belmont Park, Exeter =

Public park in Exeter, England

Coordinates: 50.7282°N 3.5172°W

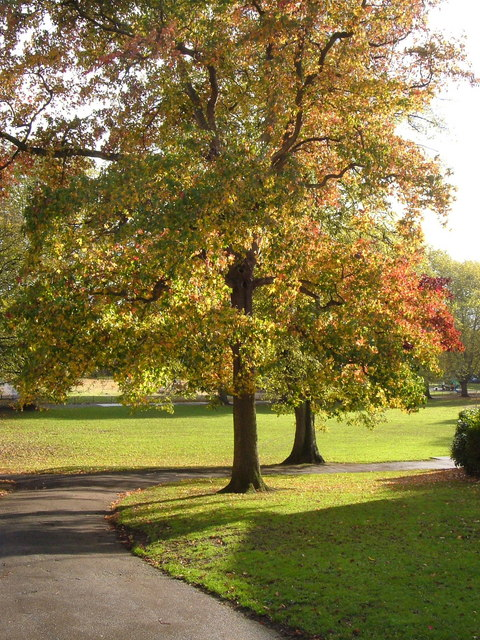
Belmont Park, Exeter

Belmont Park (also called Belmont Pleasure Grounds) is a public park in Exeter, England. Opened to the public in 1886 as a children's play area, it was subsequently enlarged for the use of the general public.

== Location ==
The park is bounded by Belmont Road, Blackboy Road, Gordon Road, Jesmond Road, Grosvener Place and Clifton Hill and is in close proximity to Clifton Hill Sports Centre and Clifton Hill Driving Range.

== Features ==
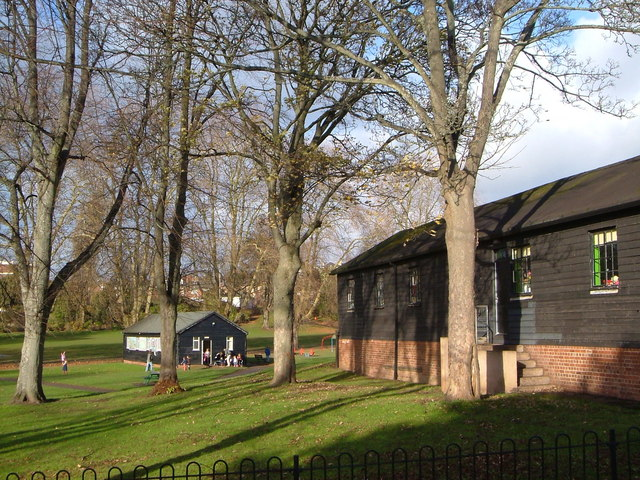
Huts in Belmont Park, Exeter

The Newtown Community Association, the Exeter Scrapstore and the Belmont Bowling Club are all located at the park. There is an area for soccer practice or other "kick about" activity, and an area dedicated to half court basketball. Seating is provided and open spaces are available for picnics. There is a large dog-free zone with equipment for younger and older children.

A sensory garden intended especially for the blind is situated at the eastern corner of the park. This aspect of the park was created in 1939 and restored in 2007.

== History ==
In 1886, Belmont park opened as a 5 acre recreational grounds. The other part of the site belonged to Mr. Philips who ran a brickfield and refused to sell his land to the council. Years later the land ownership would fall to Mr. Philips son who subsequently sold the land to Exeter City Council, who expanded the park to the footprint it takes up today.

In 1939 a sensory garden was opened in the east of the park. This was an idea by Exeter resident Daniel Manning, a gardener at the time, who later became the Devon Horticultural Superintendent.

During World War 2, the Army Pay Corps installed 20 wooden huts in the park for their use. These were then taken over by Exeter Technical College (which later became Exeter College) in 1949. By 2008 just two of these huts remained. One ran by the charity organisation Exeter Scrapstore, and the other run as a community centre through Newton Community Association.

In 2007, the Sensory Garden was restored, with new landscaping, as well as picnic tables painted by local artist Ruth Oakley and Newtown resident Gay Smith

In 2019 the old community centre was demolished and replaced with a new building, still run through Newton Community Association.

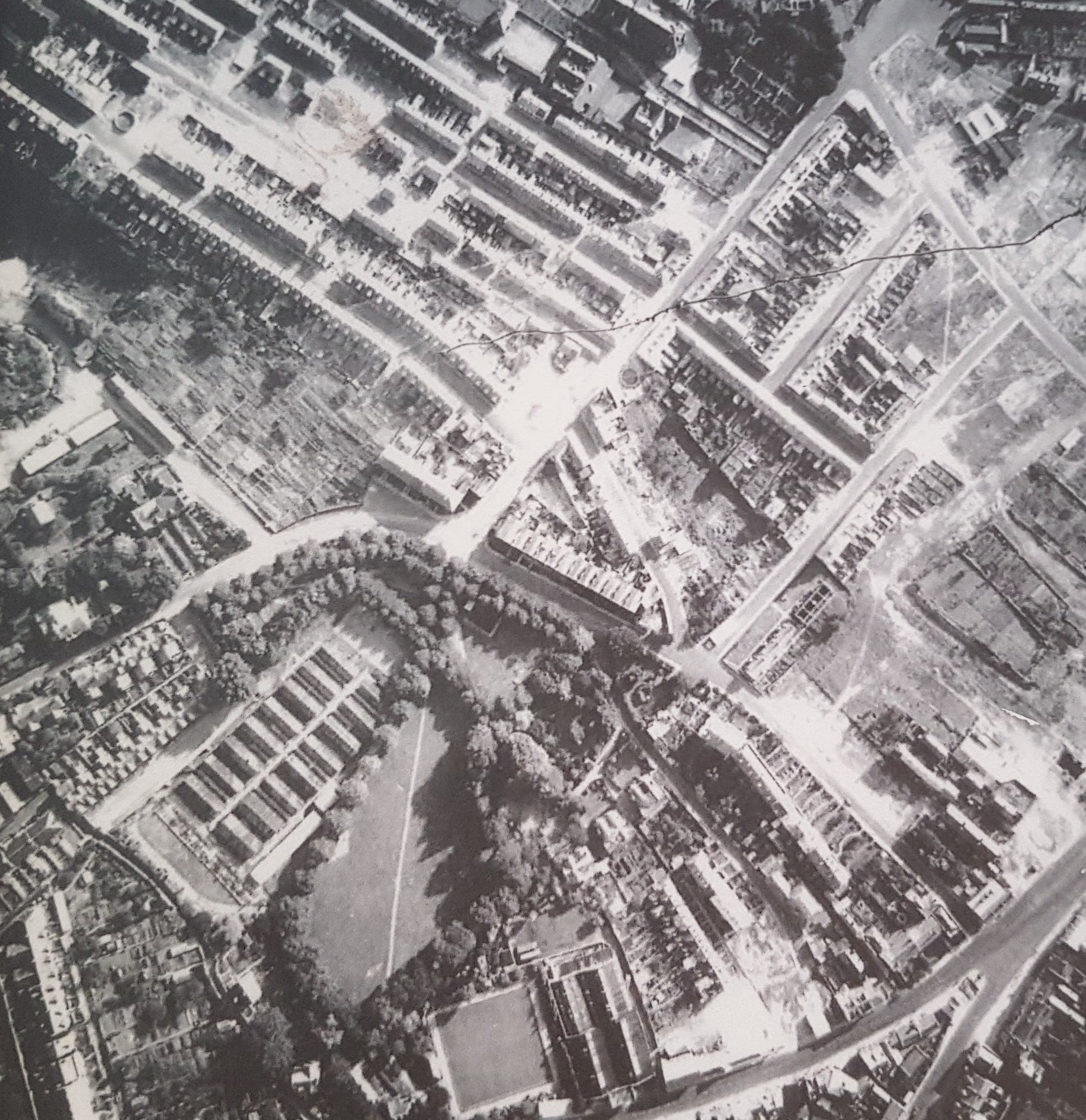
Aerial photo of Belmont Park taken during World War 2. Wooden huts installed by the Army Corps can be seen in the bottom of the image.
