= Belmont, Nova Scotia =

Belmont, Nova Scotia may refer to:

- Belmont, Colchester, Nova Scotia
- Belmont, Hants, Nova Scotia
