= Belmont (Charlottesville, Virginia) =

Historic house in Virginia, US

- U.S. National Register of Historic Places
- Virginia Landmarks Register
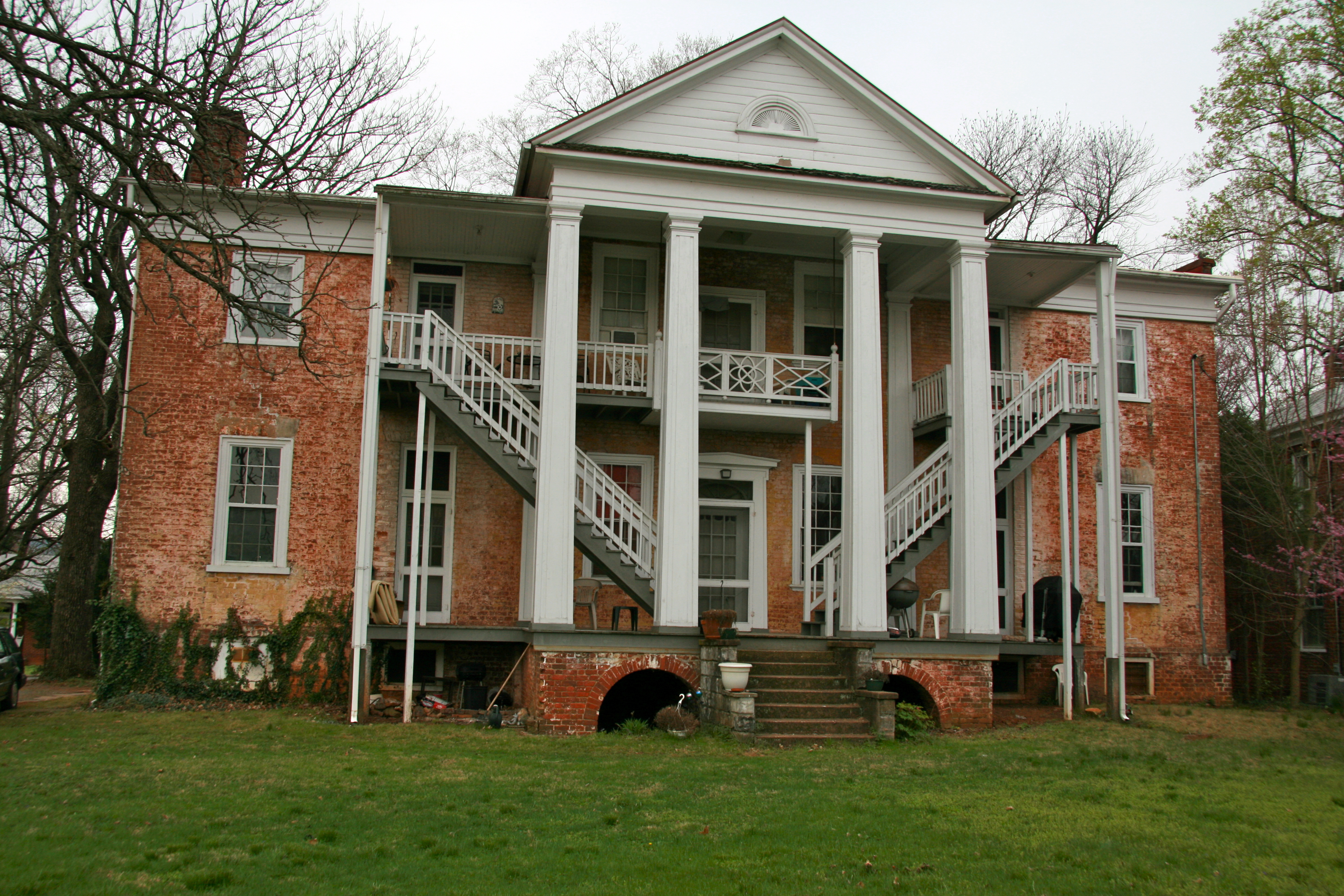
- Belmont Mansion, April 2009

- Location within Virginia Location within the United States
- Location: 759 Belmont Ave., Charlottesville, Virginia
- Coordinates: 38°1′28″N 78°28′39″W
- Area: less than one acre
- Built: before 1837
- Built by: John Jordan
- Architectural style: Greek Revival and Federal
- MPS: Charlottesville MRA
- NRHP reference No.: 82001800
- VLR No.: 104-0050

Significant dates
- Added to NRHP: October 21, 1982
- Designated VLR: October 20, 1981

Belmont, also known as the Ficklin Mansion, is a historic home located at Charlottesville, Virginia. It was built about 1820 for John Winn by Jefferson brick mason John Jordan. Originally it had a center pavilion with lower symmetrical side wings but a second story was added to the wings by John Winn's son Benjamin Bannister Winn about 1840. It is a brick dwelling showing both Greek Revival and Federal details as it was built during the transition between the two styles. It features pedimented portico supported by four square paneled columns resting on a raised brick base.

The 551-acre estate was sold at auction to Slaughter Ficklin in 1847 and he renamed it Belmont from the original Belle-mont and turned it into a renowned horse farm. In 1890 the estate was subdivided and is now the Belmont neighborhood of Charlottesville. The house has been divided into apartments.

It was listed on the National Register of Historic Places in 1982.
