= Wine on tap =

Wine on tap is a distribution method for wine.

== Process ==
Instead of pouring from a bottle, wine is packaged in stainless steel kegs or disposable plastic kegs. After the barreling stage, the wine is transferred into the kegs holding about 26 bottles of wine each (or 130 glasses) depending on the size of the keg (19.5 liters). It is pushed out of the keg with a blended gas comprising 75% nitrogen, 25% carbon dioxide, ensuring perfect wine quality till the keg is empty. Red wines and white wines are both kept at different temperatures.

== Advantages ==
Wine on tap provides cost savings at all levels, for the winery, the consumer, and the on-premise retailer. Traditionally, wine retailers have served wine by the glass by opening and resealing individual bottles. With wine on tap, the bottle, cork, capsules and carton waste are eliminated. Costs of waste from throwing away oxidized wine are also decreased and fresher, unoxidized wine is delivered to the consumer. Transportation costs are significantly reduced, as wine in keg greatly reduces the weight and space required to transport the same volume of wine, compared to bottles.

The aging process does not occur in the keg when the wine is blanketed with a gas such as nitrogen or argon to pressurize the keg. Wines not in need of significant aging times are best placed to be housed in kegs.
