= Belmont Historic District =

Belmont Historic District may refer to:

- Belmont Historic District (Belmont, North Carolina), listed on the NRHP in North Carolina
- Belmont Historic District (Belmont, Ohio), listed on the NRHP in Ohio
- Belmont–Hillsboro Historic District, Nashville, TN, listed on the NRHP in Tennessee
- Sewall–Belmont House National Historic Site, Washington, DC, listed on the NRHP in Washington, D.C.
- Belmont Historic District (Roanoke, Virginia)
