= Robert Belmont =

French lawyer and politician

- Born: 22 December 1892; Bourgoin, Isère, France
- Died: 11 April 1953 (aged 60); Bourgoin, Isère, France
- Occupation(s): Lawyer, politician

Robert Belmont (1892-1953) was a French lawyer and politician. He served as a member of the French Senate from 1933 to 1941, representing Isère.
