= Belmont Abbey =

Belmont Abbey may be

- Belmont Abbey, France, in Belmont, Haute-Marne; a French Cistercian monastery
- Belmont Abbey, North Carolina
- Belmont Abbey, Herefordshire
- Belmont Abbey College, North Carolina
