= Shanklin Village =

Housing estate in Sutton, London

Coordinates: 51.3476°N 0.1964°W

Shanklin Village, also known as the Shanklin Estate or Shanklin Village Estate, is a council housing estate in Sutton, South London, sited between Brighton Road and the Epsom Downs Branch railway line. It was built in the late 1960s to replace a number of prefabricated buildings, purpose-built after the second World War. The main road is Hulverston Close.

The estate consists of 424 deck-access flats and maisonettes built to a then-innovative layout and a few terraced houses. The southern part of the site is a large public open space known as Belmont Park.
