= Belmonte de Campos =

Coordinates: 41°56′N 4°59′W

- municipality
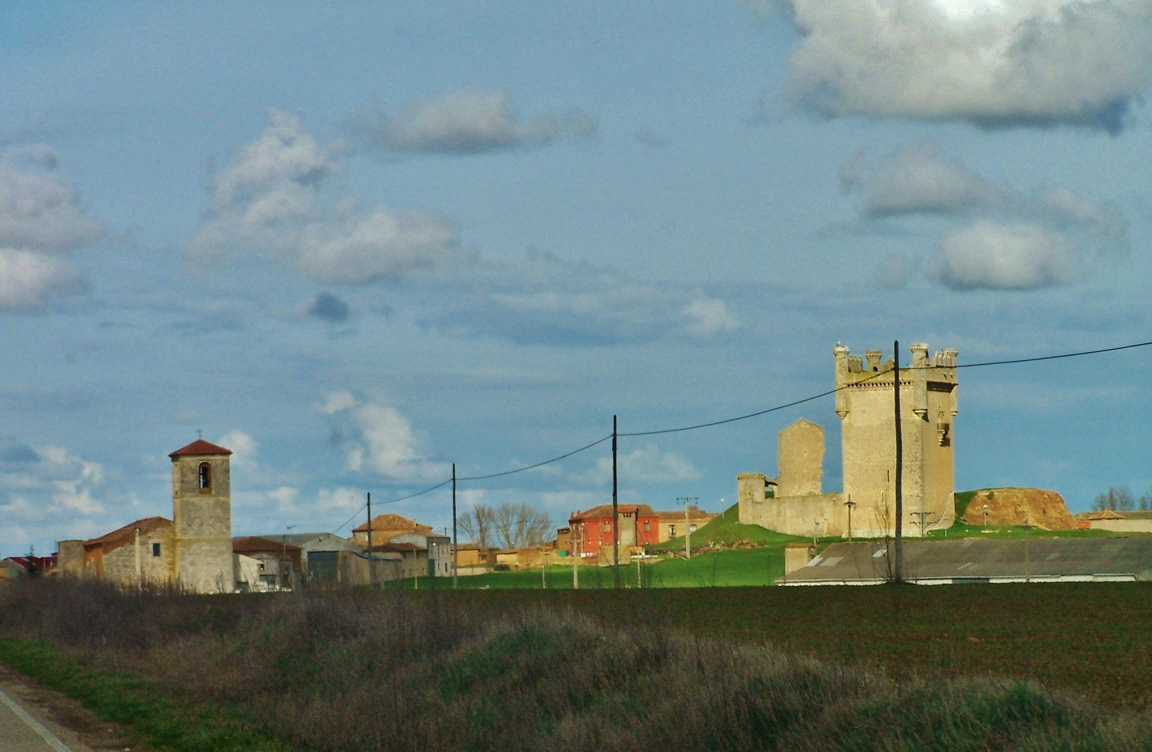
- Interactive map of Belmonte de Campos
- Country: Spain
- Autonomous community: Castile and León
- Province: Palencia
- Municipality: Belmonte de Campos

Area
  - Total: 16.14 km^{2} (6.23 sq mi)
- Elevation: 758 m (2,487 ft)

Population (2025-01-01)
  - Total: 28
  - Density: 1.7/km^{2} (4.5/sq mi)
- Time zone: UTC+1 (CET)
  - Summer (DST): UTC+2 (CEST)
- Website: Official website

Belmonte de Campos is a municipality located in the province of Palencia, Castile and León, Spain. According to the 2004 census (INE), the municipality had a population of 34 inhabitants.
