= Belmont, Bracken County, Kentucky =

Unincorporated community in Kentucky, United States

Belmont
- Unincorporated community
- Location within the state of Kentucky Belmont (the United States)
- Coordinates: 38°36′18″N 84°7′9″W
- Country: United States
- State: Kentucky
- County: Bracken
- Elevation: 886 ft (270 m)
- Time zone: UTC-6 (Central (CST))
  - Summer (DST): UTC-5 (CST)
- GNIS feature ID: 2362794

Belmont was an unincorporated community located in Bracken County, Kentucky, United States.
