= Belmont, Arkansas =

Coordinates: 35.55981°N 94.17854°W

Belmont is an unincorporated community in Crawford County, in the U.S. state of Arkansas.

== History ==
A post office was in operation at Belmont from 1848 until 1905.
