= Belmont Hotel (Missoula, Montana) =

American historic hotel

- U.S. National Register of Historic Places
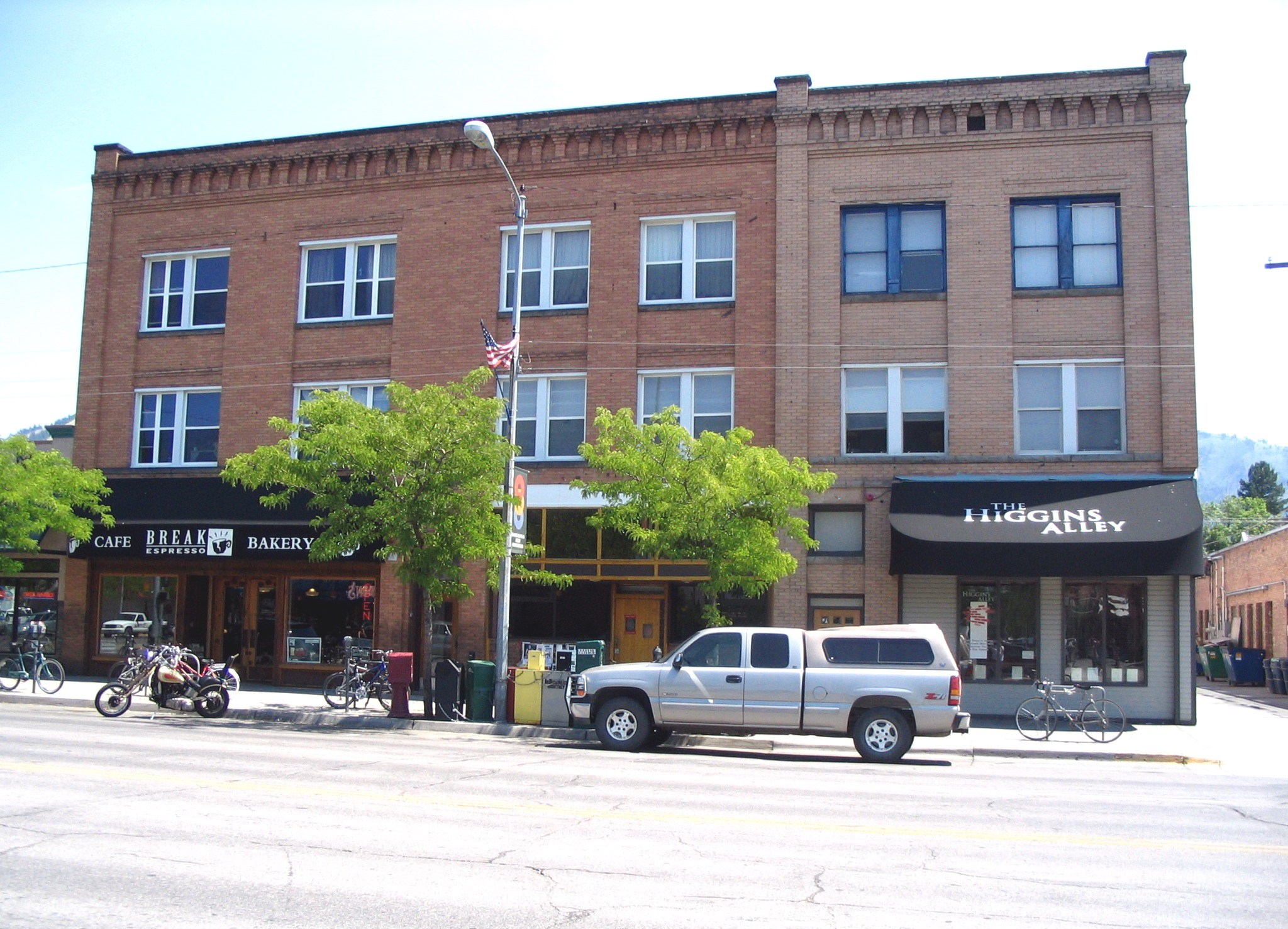
- Front of the hotel

- Location within Montana Location within the United States
- Location: 430 N. Higgins Ave., Missoula, Montana
- Coordinates: 46°52′25″N 113°59′30″W
- Built: 1913
- NRHP reference No.: 83001071
- Added to NRHP: April 20, 1983

Belmont Hotel is a hotel in Missoula, Montana. Built in 1913, it was listed on the National Register of Historic Places in 1983.

Notes on the University of Montana's collection of Belmont Hotel registers say "The Belmont Hotel was located at 430 North Higgins Avenue in Missoula, Montana, and was in business from 1911 to 1972. For the most part it operated as a railroad hotel, offering, for example, in 1927, services such as steam heat, electric light, telephone service, hot and cold-water baths, and reasonable rates by day or week. The establishment had numerous proprietors; however, Mrs. Lena Walker, a.k.a. Mrs. Lena Smith managed the hotel for most of the period of this (1918-1950) collection, from 1932 until 1956."
