= Harry Underwood =

American painter (born 1969)

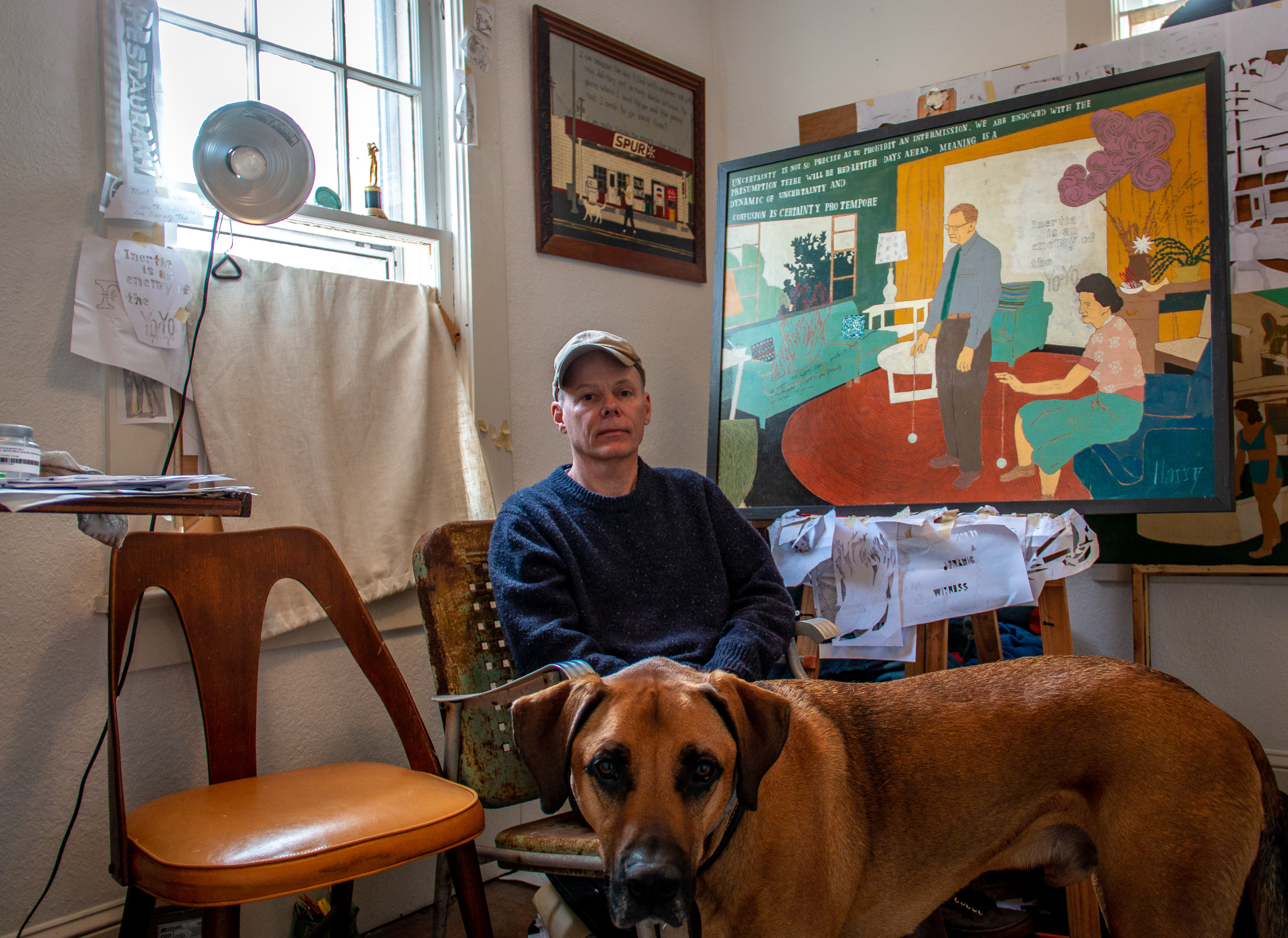
- Harry Underwood with his dog at his home studio in Springfield, Tennessee in 2018
- Born: Miami, FL
- Education: Expelled from high school (later taught self to paint)
- Known for: Painting
- Movement: Outsider art
- Website: harryunderwood.com

Harry Underwood (born 1969) is an American painter known for his use of stenciled images and literary elements executed on wood panels. His pictures are painted with house paint and written with No. 2 pencils. His subjects are an eclectic mix of realism, surrealism, pop art and invention.

Underwood has been labelled an outsider artist, a pop artist, and a folk artist. However, unlike most folk artists, his paintings are carefully planned, often taking months of ideation prior to their execution. One critic said of the detailed planning that goes into Underwood's work that "what results is more a cocktail of realism, surrealism, and pop, Edward Hopper meets Salvador Dalí meets Andy Warhol."

He is popularly known by his first name "Harry", and distinctively signs his paintings with this moniker.

== Biography ==
Harry Underwood was born in 1969 in Miami, Florida. He never completed high school, having been expelled for poor attendance.

The Most World Famous by Underwood (2005)

== Career ==
Underwood first started painting in the early 2000s while working as a flooring installer and house painter in Nashville. He discovered his color palette while going through half-used paint cans in the garage of a house where he was working.

His first major solo show was titled "A Pictorial History of Wishful Thinking" and hosted by the Estel Gallery in Nashville in 2007.

One of his paintings was used by Erin Rae as the cover of her second album, Putting on Airs.

One distinctive feature of his paintings is the text included in them. Duff Lindsay, owner of the Lindsay Gallery said of the text in Underwood's paintings: "This is not shtick. The more you read the text in his work, you realize that this is really from the heart. His text is so revealing about his longings and uncertainties. He once told me that the imagery is retro, but the text is really what he’s thinking and feeling that day. A lot of the text is that desire for sincerity and for things to be real and fair and honest."

Though labeled an outsider artist, Underwood avoids the term. When asked about it by a University of North Carolina researcher, he answered "I don’t consider myself part of a movement. I wasn’t aware of artists like Darger or Edward Hopper until I was meeting people at my shows and they began telling me I reminded them of all that. Persistence is what making art is about."

== Works ==
- Invade the Wild Kingdom
- Location is Not Essential
- Fine Weather From A Friendly Place
- The Most World Famous
- Landmark Preservation - Measuring 4' x 6', one of Underwood's largest works on long-term display at the Belcourt Theatre in Nashville. The painting is a commentary on the uncertainty created when rapidly developing cities start to demolish historical buildings in order to make room for new construction.
