= Malco Theatres =

American movie theater chain

Malco Theatres, Inc.
- Industry: Movie Theatre, Bowling Centers
- Founded: February 1915
- Founder: M.A. Lightman, Sr
- Headquarters: Memphis, Tennessee
- Area served: Arkansas, Tennessee, Mississippi, Kentucky, Missouri, Louisiana
- Key people: Stephen Lightman, Co-Chairman & CEO; Bobby Levy, Co-Chairman; Jimmy Tashie, Co Chairman; David Tashie, President & COO
- Website: www.malco.com

Malco Theatres, Inc. is an American movie theater chain founded in 1915 and based in Memphis, Tennessee. It has been owned and led by the Lightman family for four generations. Malco Theatres features 31 theatre locations with over 333 screens in six states (Arkansas, Kentucky, Louisiana, Mississippi, Missouri and Tennessee). Malco also operates three bowling centers and a family entertainment center in southern Louisiana and a family entertainment center in Oxford, Mississippi.

== Beginnings ==
M.A. Lightman, Sr. 1917

Joseph Lightman 1924

Malco Theatres' history began during World War I when Morris A. "M. A." Lightman, Sr., (known as M.A.) the son of Hungarian immigrant Joseph Lightman, left his hometown of Nashville, Tennessee, and went to Colbert County, Alabama, to work on the Wilson Dam project as an engineer. Although he held a degree in engineering from Vanderbilt University, he thought of himself more as a showman and entertainer. Lightman decided it was time to try something new one day while in Northwest Alabama, when he came upon a long line of people waiting to get into a local theatre. He decided he wanted to operate a movie theatre. Lightman traveled to Atlanta where he had made a contact in the theatre business and sought to learn the art of movie exhibition.

Upon his return two months later to Northwest Alabama, in February 1915, Lightman formed The Sterling Amusement Company and opened his first theatre in a storefront he had rented in Sheffield, Alabama. Lightman named this storefront theatre "The Liberty Theater", and later opened a 400-seat theatre, "The Majestic" across the river in Florence, Alabama at 204 North Court Street, in August 1919. Lightman opened a third theatre in the area before accepting an offer from another local theatre owner to buy out his theatres in the area. In return, Lightman received a 50 per cent stake in a theatre in North Little Rock, Arkansas.

After leaving Northwest Alabama, M.A. partnered with his father, a stone construction contractor, to build the Hillsboro Theater in Nashville, Tennessee. They opened the Hillsboro on May 18, 1925, with the D.W. Griffith film America. Three months later, Tony Sudekum, founder of Crescent Amusement Co., opened a competing theater at the opposite end of the same block. The competition with Sudekum forced M.A. and his father to close the Hillsboro Theater. The theater was used as a live production venue, including as a temporary home for The Grand Ole Opry, for many years until being converted back into a cinema and renamed the Belcourt Theatre in 1966 by a new group of owners.

The former Hillsboro Theater is still standing today and is operated by a non-profit organization as an independent art house. M.A. Lightman, Sr. left Nashville in 1926 after the Hillsboro failed and went to North Little Rock. Joseph Lightman died in 1928, in Nashville. His passing was covered on the front page of the Tennessean.

It was in North Little Rock that Lightman partnered with M.S. McCord and M.J. Pruniski forming the Malco Amusement Company. They began building a theatre chain by buying and building single screen cinemas throughout Arkansas.

In September 1926, Malco Amusement Company took on two more partners, W.F. McWilliams and L.B. Clark, in El Dorado, Arkansas. This led to the formation of Arkansas Amusement Enterprises, Inc. with a total of 32 theatres in Arkansas with locations including Little Rock, North Little Rock, Camden, Hope, and Smackover. Not long after the formation of Arkansas Amusement Enterprises, McWilliams and Clark left the partnership and bought the five El Dorado locations from the company.

In 1929, Arkansas Amusement Enterprises became Malco Theatres, Inc. This is also the year that the company took advantage of the rise of "talking pictures" by installing Vitaphone and Movietone equipment to add sound for the first time in their theatres.

Malco Theatres began acquiring cinemas not only in Arkansas but also in West Tennessee, Louisiana, Northern Mississippi, Western Kentucky, and Southeastern Missouri. It was in 1929 that Malco Theatres purchased its first location in Memphis, Tennessee, the Linden Circle Theatre.

== Movie palaces ==
=== The Memphian - Memphis, Tennessee ===
The Memphian

Malco Theatres opened The Memphian in 1935 on Cooper Avenue in Memphis. It continued operations for 50 years until being closed in 1985.

=== The Malco - Memphis, Tennessee ===
In 1940, Malco Theatres purchased the Orpheum Theatre, a former vaudevillian theatre in downtown Memphis, and renamed it The Malco. This opulent movie palace at 89 Beale Street also became the base of operations for Malco Theatres until 1976.

The Malco began operations on April 20, 1940, with its first film It's a Date. The premiere gala was sponsored by the Nineteenth Century Club.

=== The Crosstown - Memphis ===
In 1951, Malco Theatres opened The Crosstown located on Watkins in Memphis. The Crosstown cost $400,000 to build and had a seating capacity of 1,400. An overview of The Crosstown published in the 1952 Theatre Catalog describes the theatre:

A towering signature sign, measuring 90 feet (27 m) from marquee to top, and a marquee that is 75 feet (23 m) long and seven and a half feet high, strikingly distinguish the front of this neighborhood shopping district theatre. An under-the-marquee driveway for patrons to use in bad weather is provided, with a circular roadway cutting through the sidewalk under the marquee and back to the street.

The Crosstown is said to have the only contour curtain in the territory. Measuring 70 feet (21 m) across and 32 feet (9.8 m) high, the curtain rises from the floor into eight festoons, and is made of 350 yards (320 m) of 54-inch (1.4 m) plush.

Auditorium walls are in aqua, with rose-tan wainscoting and a trim of silver, gold, and red-tan. On each side wall are 45-by-22-foot murals depicting river scenes.

Malco Theatres continued to operate The Crosstown until the mid-1970s.

The Crosstown as it appeared in 1952.

The lobby and concession stand.

The auditorium with the original murals and drapes.

The floor plan of The Crosstown.

=== The Rialto - Morrilton, Arkansas ===
The Rialto was built in 1911 by Mr. Guy Vail who operated the theater until it was purchased by Malco Theaters Inc. in 1953. Mr. Vail had been not only the owner, but also the pianist of the Rialto during its silent picture days. The Rialto was purchased by the City of Morrilton in 1995 and is known as Rialto Community Arts Center.

The Rialto as it appeared in 1953

The lobby and concession stand

The auditorium and balcony

The auditorium with the original murals and drapes

The floor plan of the Rialto

=== The Temple Theater - Fort Smith, Arkansas ===
The Temple Theater was built in 1929 at the intersection of North tenth and North B Streets, but not as a movie theater, rather the building was the local Masonic Temple hence the name Temple Theater. The theater was included in the original building design as an 800-seat auditorium with a balcony, and was originally to be used for Masonic rituals. The theater first opened as a movie theater and closed in 1941. Paramount Pictures reopened the auditorium as a movie theater in 1943 through an agreement with Malco Theaters Inc, and at that time, Malco erected a large freestanding sign at the curb along North B Street. The theater was accessed via a set of three doorways along North B Street, and with the lease agreement, the temple areas of the building were secured from the theater. Also included in the lease was an agreement for the Masons to continue using the facility during specific hours. Malco closed the Temple Theater around 1973 when the new Malco Quartet was opened a few miles away. The Masons sold the building in 2013, and the building is currently being renovated as a community events center by FSM Redevelopment Partners LLC.

=== The New Theater - Fort Smith, Arkansas ===
The New Theater (Sparks Theater) located at Garrison Ave. and North 11th Streets was constructed in 1911 by George Sparks who was then president of First National Bank of Fort Smith. Sparks was so inspired by the architecture of the New Amsterdam Theater that he hired the same architect to build his theater in Fort Smith. The theater officially opened on September 29, 1911, as a performing arts venue charging $10 US per person for admission. It was in 1942 that the theater was acquired by Malco Theaters Inc. and transformed into a movie theater which was located only two blocks from the Temple Theater (above). When Malco Theaters took over the building, the auditorium had a capacity of 1,200 patrons with two full balconies. Entrances were located along Garrison Ave. as well as North 11th St. The North 11th Street (East) entrance served as the entrance for the balconies while the Garrison Ave Entrance served the main auditorium level. The East entrance had two doorways - one for whites and one for colored persons; however, both used the same stairwells to the balconies, and had shared facilities within the building. In 1970 with business declining in the downtown area, and business moving to the newly completed central mall, Malco received the approval to begin showing pornographic movies in the facility. Malco also closed the New Theater in 1973 with the Temple Theater as the new Malco Quartet had opened a few miles away. The new theater was gutted of all furnishings and fixtures when Malco sold the building, and it has remained vacant since although there have been a few investors attempt to remodel the building to its former glory. The building was listed on the National Register of Historic Places in 1999.

=== Time of change ===
After three decades of partnership, M.A. Lightman, Sr. announced on July 17, 1952, that Malco Theatres, Inc. and Malco Realty Corp. had acquired the outstanding 33 percent of the stock that was owned by M.S. McCord and M.J. Pruniski. At the time, Malco Theatres operated 63 theatres in Tennessee, Kentucky, Arkansas, Mississippi and Louisiana including the Crescent Drive-In that had just opened in New Orleans. Pruniski and McCord retained the group of theatres in North Little Rock removing them from the Malco chain.

On December 8, 1958, at age 67, M.A. Lightman, Sr. died as a result of a heart attack while in Detroit. Like his father before him, his death garnered an epitaph on the front page of the local newspaper.

During the highly controversial period of integration in the South, Malco Theatres introduced integrated seating in their five Memphis theatres without any major incident. M.A. Lightman, Sr.'s two sons, M.A. Lightman, Jr. and Richard Lightman were running the company during this time. In the segregated South, movie theatres would only permit black patrons in the balcony, providing them with a separate entrance to the building. In 1962, Richard Lightman met with Vasco Smith of the Memphis Bi-Racial Committee and set up a staggered process over a three-week span where the first week they sold tickets to the "whites only" orchestra level at The Malco (the present-day Orpheum) to one African-American couple. The second week it was increased to four couples and the third week it was increased even more. By the fourth week, all African-American patrons were permitted to buy tickets anywhere in the theatre. Richard worked with the local media to keep any news of the integration to a minimum as to avoid any conflict with the outspoken pro-segregation leaders of the time.

This initial period of integration of the Memphis theatres saw only one incident of note. During a showing of Cleopatra at The Crosstown, a white patron poured his soda down the neck of an African-American patron. Richard Lightman sought to calm the situation with the patron and keep the incident out of the news. As a result, Malco Theatres purchased the gentleman a new suit.

In the summer of 1969, it was announced that Cinerama, Inc., of New York was purchasing Malco Theatres, Inc., for $10 million. At the time Malco had 50 theatres in five states. The deal was never finalized and Malco Theatres remained in the control of the Lightman family.

=== Quartets ===
On June 4, 1970, M. A. Lightman, Jr., announced Malco Theatres' plans for the first two four-screen cinemas for the company. The first, the Highland Quartet, was in Memphis at the corner of Highland and Poplar in what was then called "Dillard Mall". The second quartet was three and a half miles away in the Clark Tower. At the time, four screen theatres were considered huge and were not yet common. M. A. Lightman, Jr. had this to say concerning these two locations:

With this setup, we can bring back films that a neighborhood house couldn't because of the overhead and small return. With our overhead more or less centralized, we could bring in a film that would attract, say, only a hundred or so, but we could do it because we wanted to and without loss.

Every type of good picture -- with the exception of the nudies, of course -- will be brought in. We haven't figured out all the combinations ourselves.

The Dillard Mall building is already completed and will be turned over to us in several weeks. It will take us only about three months to complete our additions. Plans call for the new Clark Tower to be started this spring. It should be completed in about 18 months.

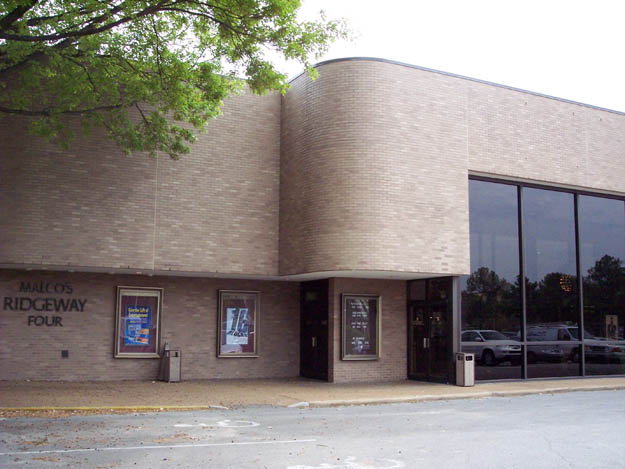
The Ridgeway - Memphis, Tennessee

The Clark Tower Quartet was never built. The Highland opened later that year and operated until the fall of 2005.

Friday, June 16, 1977, saw the opening of the Ridgeway Four theatre in East Memphis. The opening slate of films was A Bridge Too Far, The Little Girl Who Lives Down the Lane, The Other Side of Midnight, and Final Chapter - Walking Tall. The Ridgeway Four also became the location of Malco's corporate headquarters and continues to serve in that capacity.

=== Planned sale ===
Malco Theatres, Inc. confirmed to the Commercial Appeal, on July 24, 1986, the sale of the company's 38 locations to Commonwealth Amusements Corp. of Kansas City, Missouri, was scheduled to be completed by the end of that summer. The deal fell through when Commonwealth decided not to expand at that time. Commonwealth Amusements ended up selling all of their theatre assets, mostly to United Artists Theaters, by 1990.

It was in December of that same year when company president, Stephen P. Lightman (son of M.A. Lightman, Jr.) announced that Malco Theatres would expand.

Rather than sell our circuit as many small circuits around the country are now doing, we have made a commitment to become more aggressive and find our niche in the new wave of theater exhibition. We will be one of the smaller chains. We used to be a fairly good-sized chain, but it's getting down to six or seven dominant chains.

=== Multiplexes ===
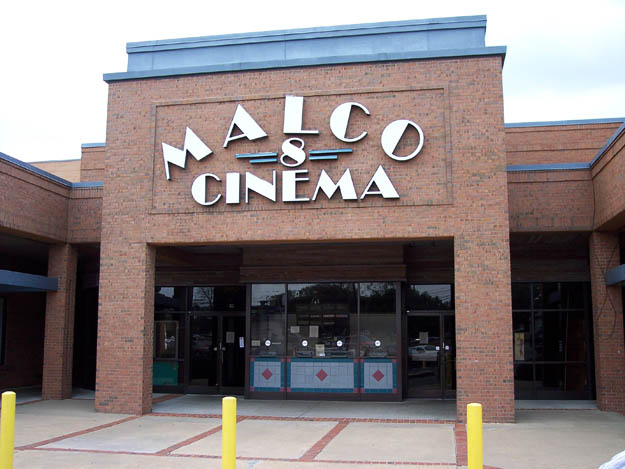
The Winchester Court - Memphis, Tennessee

On July 3, 1987, the Winchester Court cinema opened three of its eight screens as the company's and the area's first multiplex. This opening came only three and a half months after construction began. The estimated price tag for the complex was around half a million dollars. The first film shown was Innerspace.

One of the Winchester Court's two 350 seat auditoriums was THX-certified. All of the auditoriums featured JBL speakers and Dolby processors. The theatre also had 70mm film projection capability in its two 350 seat auditoriums. Four of the auditoriums could seat 210 with the remaining two auditoriums seating 160.

Malco's first and only foray into the megaplex scene began with the Majestic theatre, which opened in 1997 with 11 screens and expanded to 20 in 1998. A technological showcase, the Majestic featured THX-certified auditoriums, Dolby Digital and DTS audio, large format screens and an auditorium with a custom-designed audio system with Klipsch speakers.

=== Theatres of the past (incomplete listing) ===
==== Singles, twins, trios & quartets ====
- The Liberty (Sheffield, Alabama 1915-19??)
- Hillsboro Theater (Nashville, Tennessee 1925–26)
- The Grand (Huntsville, Alabama 1925–1928)
- Linden Circle (Memphis, Tennessee 1929–1961)
- The Ozark (Fayetteville, Arkansas 1930–1980)
- The Memphian (Memphis, Tennessee 1935–1985)
- The Palace (Fayetteville, Arkansas 1935–1969)
- The Capitol (Newport, Arkansas 1935–1964)
- The Seville (Owensboro, Kentucky 1935–1955)
- Paramount Theatre (Jackson, Tennessee ????-1986)
- The Lyric (Tupelo, Mississippi 1935–1985)
- The Strand (Jonesboro, Arkansas 1935–1975)
- The Malco (Helena, Arkansas ????)
- The Malco (Hot Springs, Arkansas ????)
- The Malco (Memphis, Tennessee 1940–1976)
- The Strand (Newport, Arkansas 1940–1975)
- U-Ark (Fayetteville, Arkansas 1945–1980)
- The Temple (Fort Smith, Arkansas 1943–1973)
- The New Theater (Fort Smith, Arkansas 1942–1973)
- The Fulton (Fulton, Kentucky 1945–1978)
- The Malco (Jackson, Tennessee ????-1987)
- The Malco (Camden, Arkansas 1950-????)
- The Malco (Pine Bluff, Arkansas ????)
- New Malco (Owenseboro, Kentucky 1950–1990)
- The Orpheum (Fulton, Kentucky 1950–1964)
- The Crosstown (Memphis, Tennessee 1951–1974)
- The Rialto (Morrilton, Arkansas 1953-????)
- The Capitol (Union City, Tennessee ????)
- The Princess (Columbus, Mississippi ????-1969)
- The State (Jonesboro, Arkansas 1961–1975)
- The Avon (West Memphis, Arkansas 1961-????)
- Phoenix 2 (Ft. Smith, Arkansas 1963–1988)
- The Lyric (Aberdeen, Mississippi 1966–1974)
- Malco Twin Cinema (Rogers, Arkansas 1902–2000)
- Mall Twin Cinema (Owensboro, Kentucky 1970–1997)
- Plaza Twin Cinema (Owensboro, Kentucky 1967-2000)
- Malco Twin Cinema (Fort Smith, Arkansas ????)
- Malco Twin Cinema (Columbus, Mississippi 197?-2004)
- Varsity Twin Cinema (Columbus, Mississippi 1979–2006)
- Malco Twin Cinema (Tupelo, Mississippi 19??-1990)
- Malco Mall Cinema (Tupelo, Mississippi 19??-1990)
- Plaza Twin Cinema (Jonesboro, Arkansas ????-1999)
- Tupelo Quartet (Tupelo, Mississippi 19??-2002)
- Malco Mall Cinema (Sikeston, Missouri 19??-1998)
- Highland Quartet (Memphis, Tennessee 1971–2005)
- Malco Quartet (Ft. Smith, Arkansas 1973–1999)
- Mall Cinema (Columbus, Mississippi ????-2005)
- Cinema III (Columbus, Mississippi ????-2005)
- The Paramount (Memphis, Tennessee 1969–1975)
- Cabana Twin (Jackson, Tennessee 19??-1991)
- Old Hickory Mall Cinema (Jackson, Tennessee 1975–1991)
- Springdale Twin (Springdale, Arkansas 1980–1995)
- Mall Twin Cinema (Fayetteville, Arkansas 1972–2009)
- Malco Trio (Blytheville, Arkansas 1945–2010)
- Malco Trio (Sikeston, Missouri 1950–2016)

==== Multiplexes ====
- Malco Cinema (Jackson, Tennessee 1976–2001) (originally Malco Quartet)
- Trinity Commons (Memphis, Tennessee 1988–2004)
- The Appletree 12 (Memphis, Tennessee 1991–2001)
- Razorback 6 (Fayetteville, Arkansas 1977–2007)
- Winchester Court (Memphis, Tennessee 1987–2008)
- Raleigh Springs Mall Cinema (2002–2011)
- Malco Quartet (Fort Smith, Arkansas 1973–1999)
- Majestic Cinema (Memphis, Tennessee 1997-2020)
- Bartlett Cinema (Bartlett, Tennessee 1989-2022)

==== Drive-ins ====
- Stardust Drive-In Theater (Watertown, Tennessee ????-present)
- Bellevue Drive-In (Memphis, Tennessee 1955–1985)
- Crescent Drive-In (New Orleans 1955–1975)
- Frayser Drive-In (Memphis, Tennessee 1955–1985)
- Starlight Drive-In (Owensboro, Kentucky 1961–1975)
- 61 Drive-In (Memphis, Tennessee 1961–1965)
- 78 Drive-In (Tupelo, Mississippi 19??-1986)
- Starvue (Fayetteville, Arkansas 19??-1985)
- Skyvue (Ft. Smith, Arkansas 19??-1986)
- Fiesta Drive-In (Columbus, Mississippi 197?-1988)
- Jaxon Drive-In (Memphis, Tennessee 1961–1969)
- Cardinal Drive-In (Mayfield, Kentucky 1961–1975)
- Southwest Twin Drive-In (Memphis, Tennessee 1968–2000)
- Summer Drive-In (Memphis, Tennessee 1950–1969, Twin 1969–1985, Quartet 1985–2007, Trio 2007–2009, Quartet 2009–2025)

== Present day ==
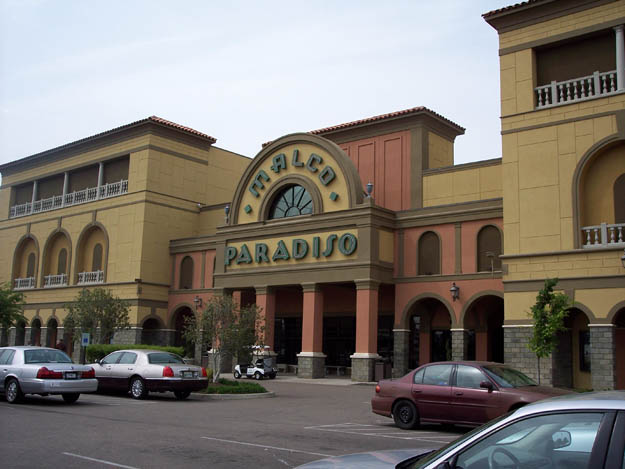
The Paradiso - Memphis, Tennessee

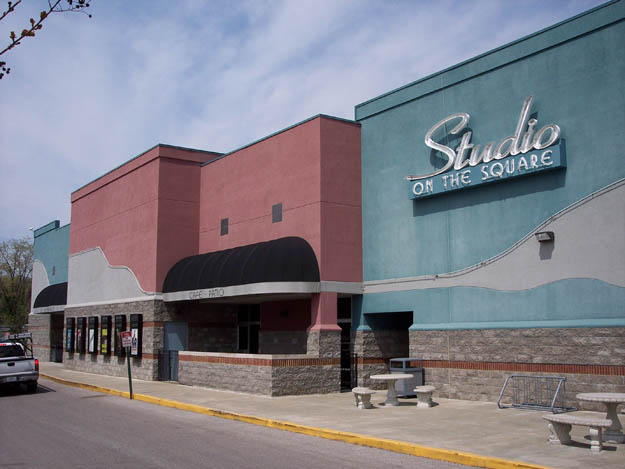
Studio on the Square - Memphis, Tennessee

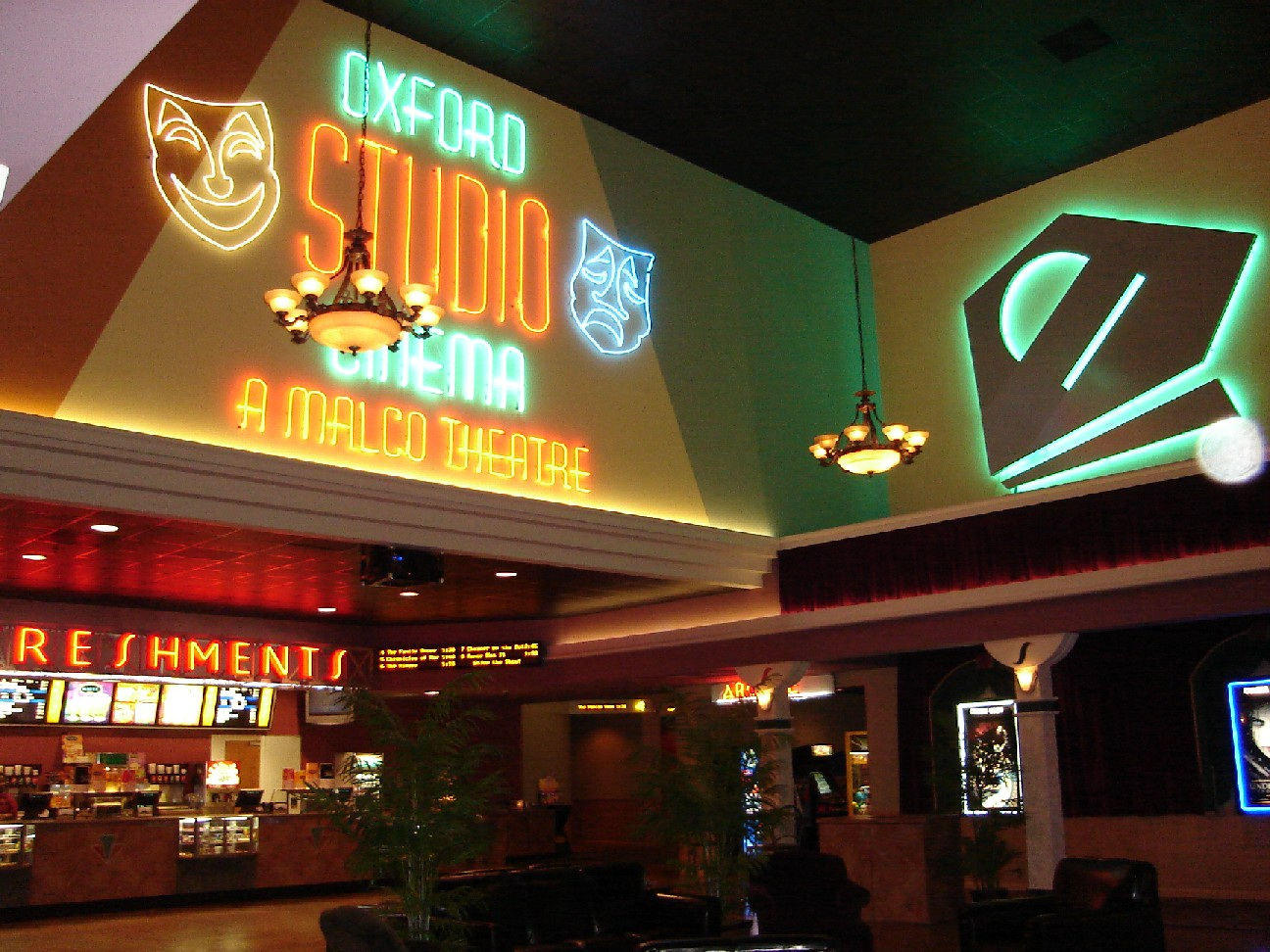
Oxford Studio Cinema - Oxford, Mississippi

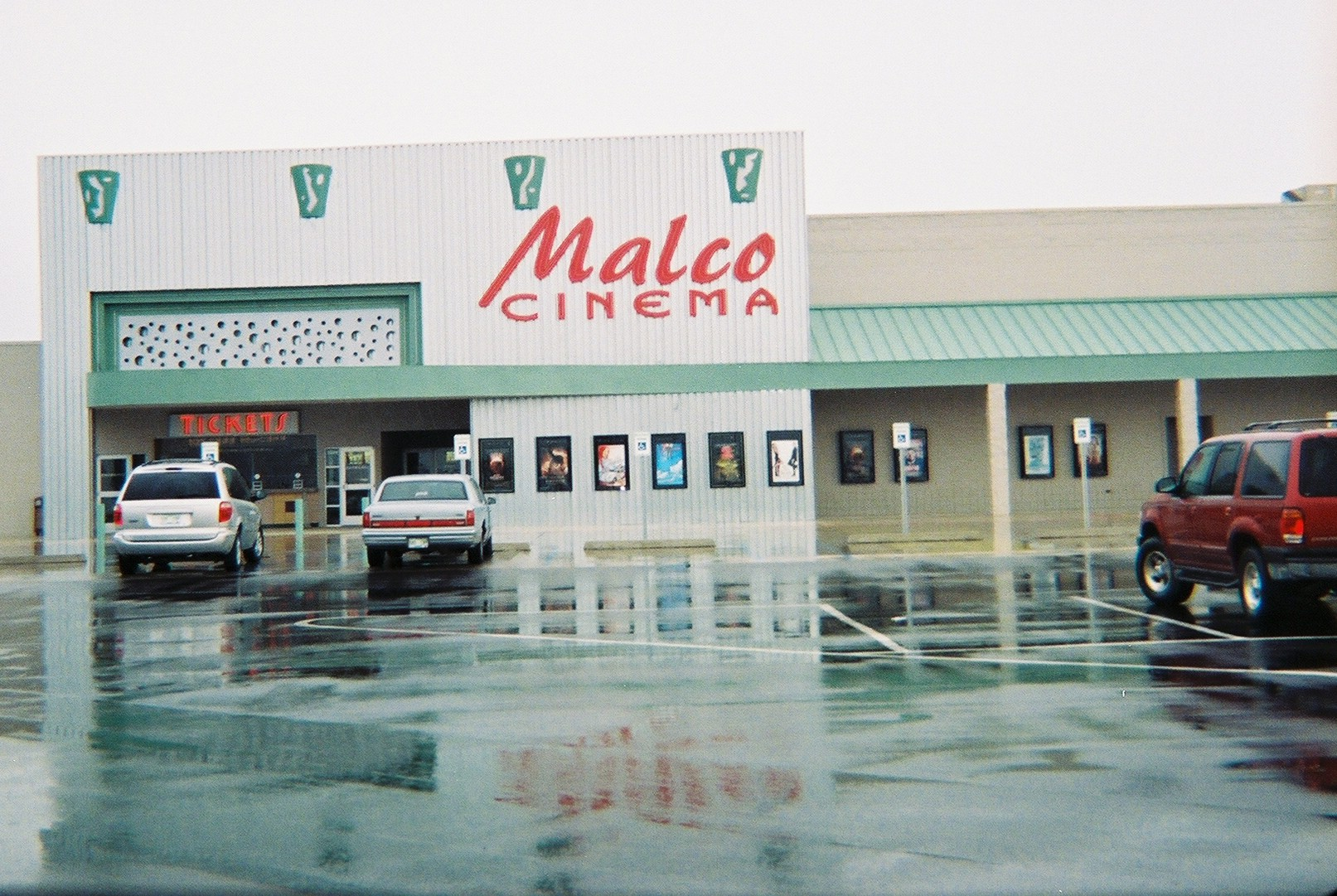
Malco Cinema 8 - Columbus, Mississippi

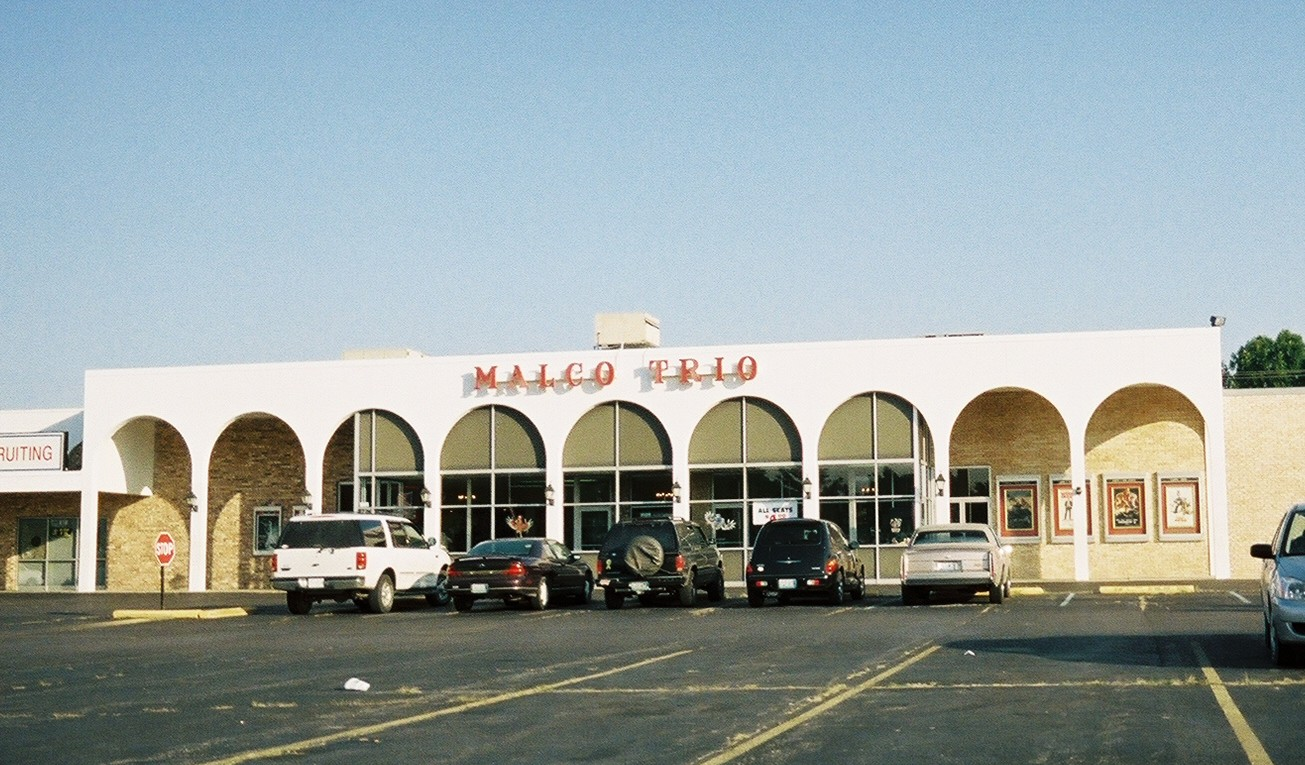
Malco Trio - Sikeston, Missouri

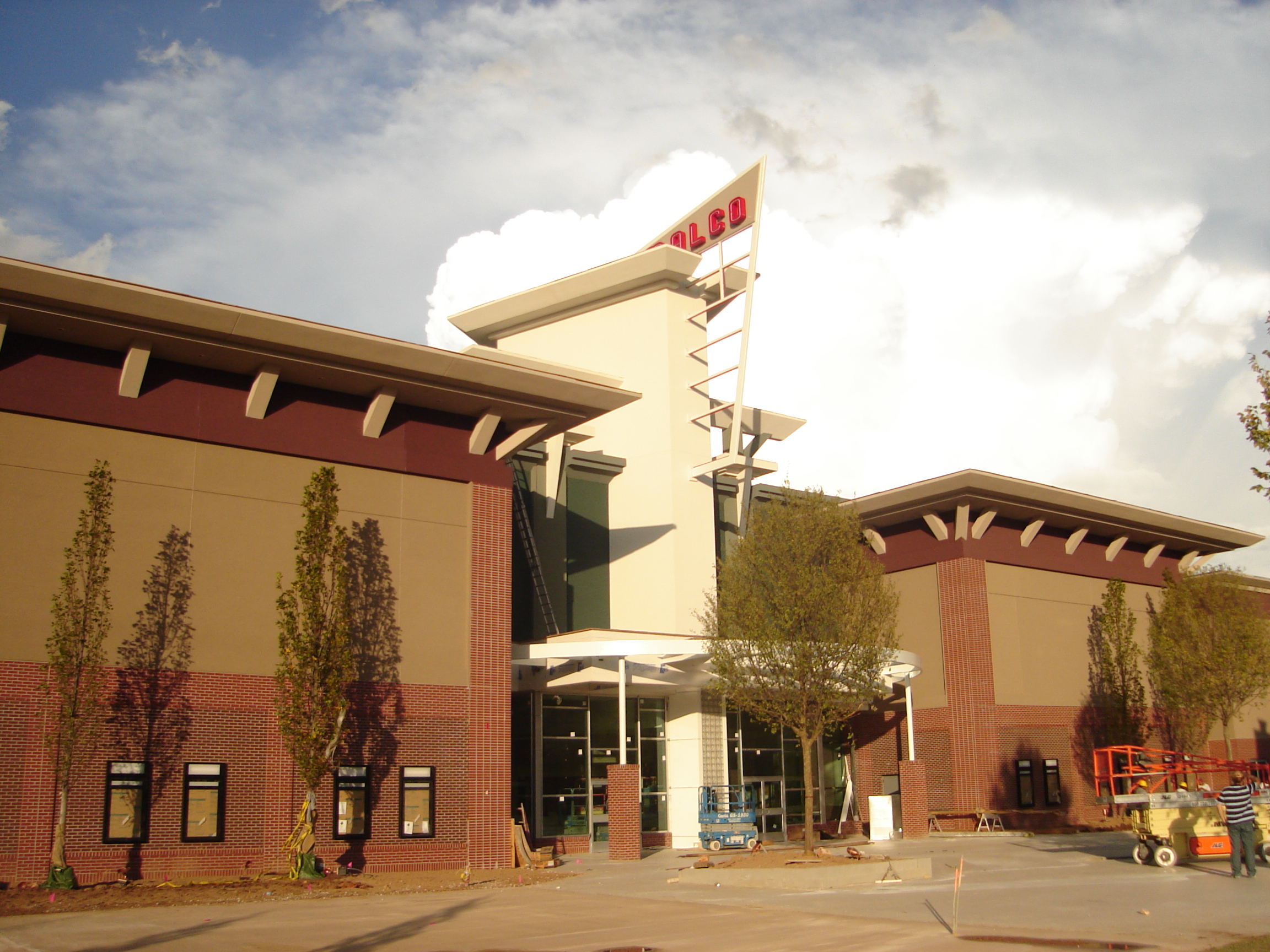
Pinnacle Hills - Rogers, Arkansas

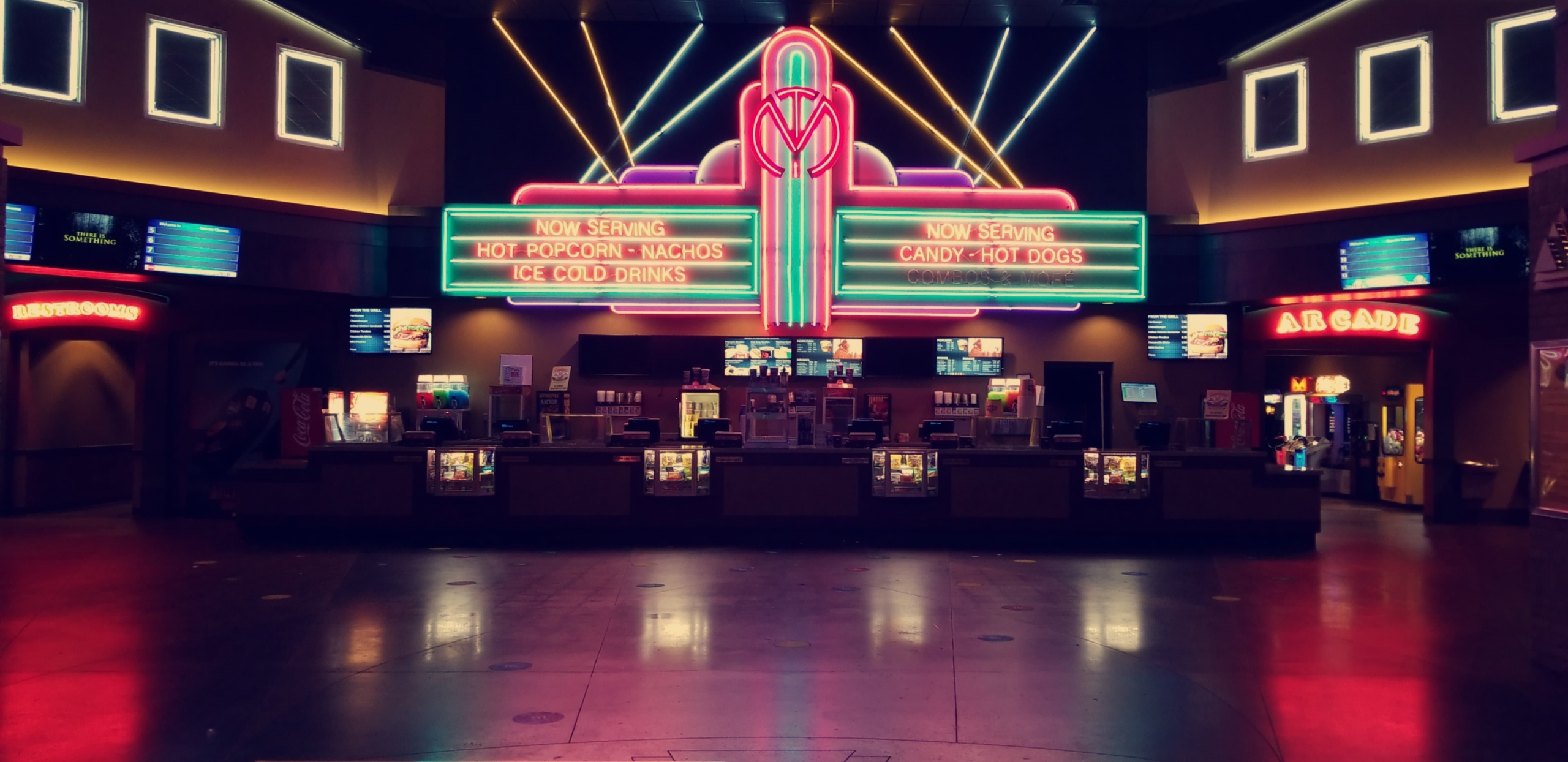
Malco Desoto Cinema and Grill- Southaven, Mississippi

=== Digital projection ===
Malco Theatres is a fully digital circuit, using Dolby Digital Cinema systems throughout as well as Dolby Digital 3D systems; although, many Malco screens still have film projection capabilities installed.

=== IMAX ===
Malco Theatres features three signature IMAX screens. Malco Paradiso Cinema Grill, Malco Razorback Cinema Grill and Malco Grandview Cinema.

Paradiso and Razorback were the first two IMAX sites for Malco, opening in December 2017; each location boosts a screen size of 65'-9" wide X 36'-2 high. Grandview Cinema marked the 3rd location for Malco, opening in December 2019 with a screen size of 68-3" wide X 38'1" high.

=== MXT ===
In 2019, Malco debuted its own large-format screen experience with the MXT “Extreme” Theatre at the Powerhouse Cinema Grill in Downtown Memphis. Featuring a 72 ft screen with laser projection and Dolby ATMOS sound, the MXT rivaled other premium experiences with exceptional state-of-the-art sight, sound and presentation. The success of the initial Malco-branded format led to the addition of an MXT screen at the Collierville Cinema Grill (Collierville, TN) and Owensboro Cinema Grill (Owensboro, KY) locations.

=== Current theatre locations ===
==== Tennessee ====
- Stage Cinema Grill (Bartlett)
- Malco Towne Cinema Grill & MXT (Collierville)
- Forest Hill Cinema Grill (Germantown)
- Paradiso Cinema Grill & IMAX (Memphis)
- Studio on the Square (Memphis)
- Wolfchase Galleria Cinema Grill (Memphis)
- Ridgeway Cinema Grill (Memphis)
- Cordova Cinema Grill (Memphis)
- Malco Smyrna Cinema (Smyrna)
- Powerhouse Cinema Grill & MXT (Downtown Memphis)

==== Arkansas ====
- Pinnacle Hills Cinema (Rogers)
- Malco Towne Cinema Grill (Rogers)
- Sunset Cinema Grill (Springdale)
- Razorback Cinema Grill & IMAX (Fayetteville)
- The Malco 16/ The Malco Mall Trio (Fort Smith)
- Mall Trio (Fort Smith)
- Hollywood Cinema (Jonesboro)
- Studio at Greensborough Village (Jonesboro)
- Hollywood Cinema (Monticello)
- Van Buren Cinema (Van Buren)

==== Mississippi ====
- Grandview Cinema & IMAX (Madison)
- Renaissance Cinema Grill (Ridgeland)
- Oxford Commons Cinema Grill (Oxford)
- Corinth Cinema (Corinth)
- DeSoto Cinema Grill (Southaven)
- Olive Branch Cinema Grill (Olive Branch)
- Tupelo Commons Cinema Grill (Tupelo)
- Columbus Cinema (Columbus)

==== Kentucky ====
- Owensboro Cinema Grill & MXT (Owensboro)
- Winchester Cinema (Winchester)

==== Missouri ====
- Sikeston Cinema & Grill (Sikeston)

==== Louisiana ====
- Gonzales Cinema (Gonzales)

==== Bowling centers ====
- Premier Lanes (Oxford, Mississippi)
- Premier Lanes (Gonzales, Louisiana)
- Acadiana Lanes (Lafayette, Louisiana)
