= Bellemonte =

Historic house in North Carolina, United States

- U.S. National Register of Historic Places
- Location within North Carolina Location within the United States
- Location: 3400 N. Wesleyan Blvd., Rocky Mount, North Carolina
- Coordinates: 36°0′56″N 77°46′17″W
- Area: 1.7 acres (0.69 ha)
- Built: 1817, c. 1820
- Architectural style: Georgian, Federal
- NRHP reference No.: 89002132
- Added to NRHP: December 21, 1989

Bellemonte, also known as Dr. John F. Bellamy House, is a historic plantation house located at Rocky Mount, Nash County, North Carolina. The main block dates to 1817, and is a two-story, five-bay, late Georgian / Federal-style frame dwelling.

The façade features a two-tier, Chippendale-inspired portico. The house has a two-story rear ell, built about 1820, that was attached to Bellemonte between 1840 and 1860. Also on the property is a contributing dependency.

Bellemonte was listed on the National Register of Historic Places in 1989. It now houses the Marketing Dept as well as offers events by North Carolina Wesleyan College.
