= Belmont, Washington =

Unincorporated community in Washington, United States

Belmont
- Unincorporated community
- Location within Washington (state) Location within the United States Location within North America
- Coordinates: 47°5′16.6″N 117°9′44.6″W
- Country: United States
- State: Washington
- County: Whitman
- Elevation: 2,510 ft (765 m)
- Time zone: UTC-8 (Pacific (PST))
  - Summer (DST): UTC-7 (PDT)
- ZIP code: 99158
- Area code: 509
- GNIS feature ID: 1513062

Belmont is an unincorporated community in Whitman County, Washington, United States.

== History ==
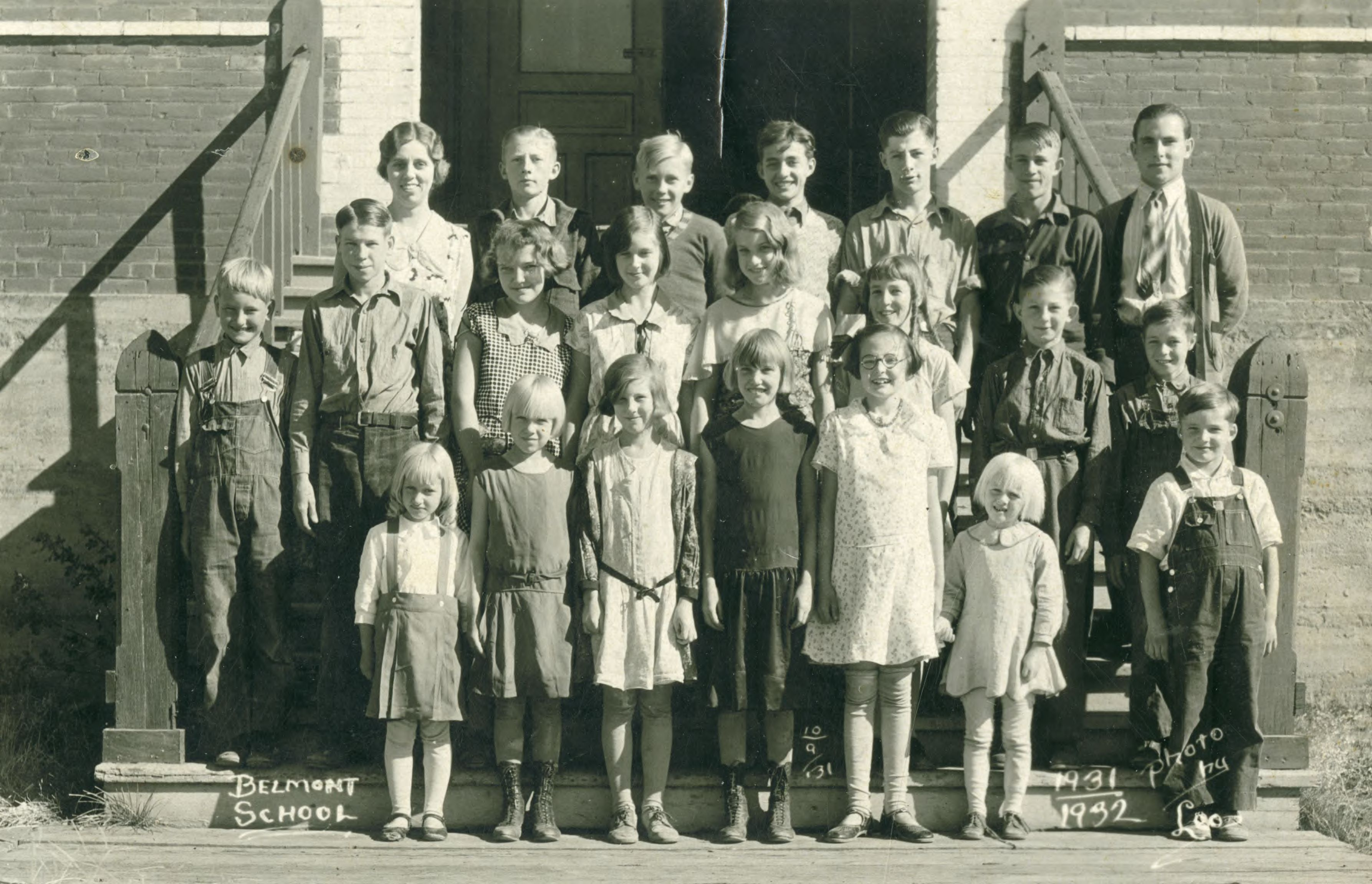
Belmont School in the 1931–1932 school year

Because it is not tracked by the U.S. Census, a Census population estimate is not available. First settled in 1886, there are only about seven houses (most of which sit empty) in Belmont, which is assigned the ZIP code 99104. A 1910 plat map of the community shows 11 full city blocks and seven partial city blocks.

In 2009 the community was the site of a controversy surrounding a proposal to store chlorine gas in rail cars on the siding in Belmont. The grain elevators in Belmont were taken down around 2014.

== Geography ==
Belmont is 22 miles (35 km) south of the town of Rosalia and 5 miles (8 km) south of Oakesdale. Belmont is 24 miles (39 km) from the Whitman County Seat of Colfax.

Washington State Route 27 passes through Belmont, connecting it with the nearby communities of Oakesdale to the north and Garfield to the south. The road, as well as a railroad track, follow the path of an intermittent stream called Kelley Creek which cuts through the rolling grasslands of the Palouse.
