= Belmont (cigarette) =

Canadian cigarette brand

- Finnish pack of Belmont
- Product type: Cigarette
- Produced by: Philip Morris International
- Country: Canada
- Introduced: The early 1960s
- Markets: See Markets

Belmont is a Canadian brand of cigarettes, currently owned and manufactured by Philip Morris International (PMI) in most parts of the world.

== History ==
Belmont cigarettes were introduced by Benson & Hedges (Canada) Ltd. in the early 1960s, and featured a charcoal filter tip. The company became Rothmans Benson & Hedges Ltd. in 1986.

The brand was renamed Belmont Milds in 1975, and remained so until 2007, when such terms on tobacco packaging were discontinued. An extra light version (known as Belmont Silver) was introduced around that time. In 2009, a slim version of Belmonts were introduced, called Belmont Edge. It was also produced in the United States briefly in the 1960s by Philip Morris USA.

In 1990, before the implementation of the Tobacco Advertising Prohibition Act, Philip Morris Australia launched a new brand, Belmont. Reports on the brand's launch were faxed directly to British American Tobacco (UK and Exports) and to Biggott, the Venezuela-based manufacturer of Belmont cigarettes, the main smuggled brand. As well, Belmonts were spotted in several stores in Serbia in June 2009, with all English packaging.

== Production and markets ==
Belmont is also produced in Guatemala (by "Tabacalera Nacional"), Panama (by "Tabacalera Istmena"), Honduras (by "Hondurena"), Nicaragua, and Costa Rica (where it was introduced by "Republic Tobacco" in 1982). It was also introduced in Finland by Amer-Tupakka circa 1975. In Finland, the cigarettes were manufactured by Philip Morris up to 2004 under an exclusive license from Amer tobacco Ltd., until the company gave up its tobacco business and began to concentrate on sports equipment under the name of Amer Sports.

Belmont is sold in the following countries: Canada, Honduras, Guatemala, Costa Rica, Dominican Republic, Brazil, Chile, Colombia, Venezuela, Ecuador, Paraguay, Finland, Spain, Egypt, South Africa, and Israel.

== See also ==
- Tobacco smoking
