= Belmont–Hillsboro Historic District =

Historic district in Nashville, Tennessee

- U.S. National Register of Historic Places
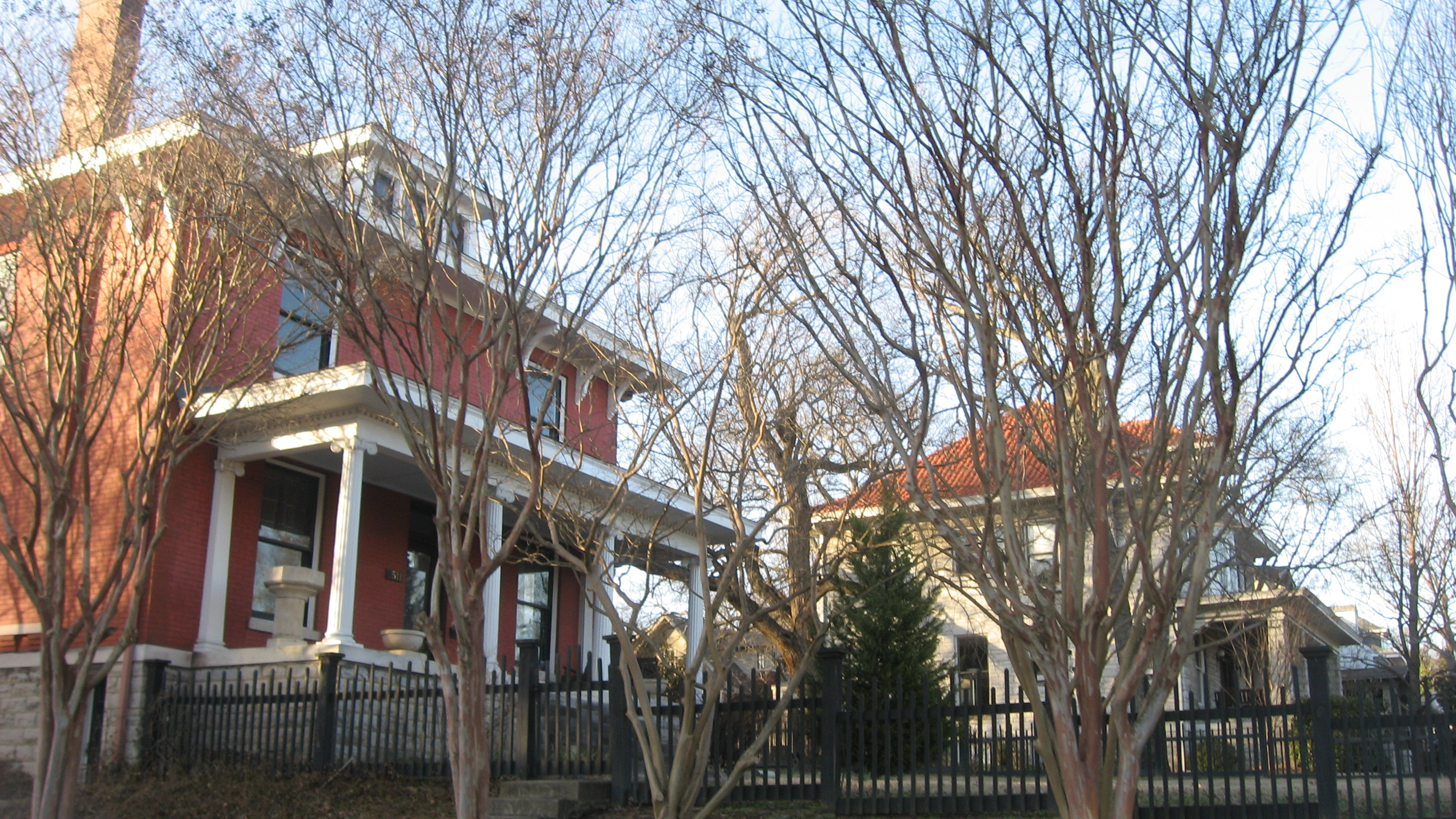
- Houses on the northwestern corner of Sweetbriar Avenue and Belmont Boulevard

- Location within Tennessee Location within the United States
- Location: Nashville, Tennessee
- Coordinates: 36.13°N 86.7975°W
- Built: 1900-1924
- Architect: Multiple
- Architectural style: Georgian architecture; Federal architecture
- Website: belmont-hillsboro.com
- NRHP reference No.: 80003784
- Added to NRHP: May 1, 1980

Belmont–Hillsboro Historic District is a historic neighborhood in Nashville, Tennessee. It was listed on the National Register of Historic Places listings in Davidson County, Tennessee (NRHP) ion May 1, 1980. The area homes are now protected by a Belmont-Hillsboro Neighborhood Conservation Zone which creates rules for homeowners within the district.

== History ==
The district's homes were built between 1920 and 1924. it is located between Primrose and 20th Avenues and between Magnolia and Belmont Boulevards.

=== Belmont-Hillsboro Neighbors, Inc. ===
The Belmont-Hillsboro Neighbors, Inc., (BHN) is the longest operating neighborhood organization in Nashville, and it was founded in 1971. The organizations goal is to protect the historic neighborhood by providing rules for homeowners.

=== Belmont-Hillsboro Neighborhood Conservation Zone ===
In 2005 The Belmont-Hillsboro Neighborhood Conservation Zoning Overlay, was created to protect the existing structures within the district. The area of conservation originally included 800 properties: it was passed by the Metro Council and signed by Mayor Bill Purcell. There have been 300 properties added to the conservation: two-hundred in 2007, and in one-hundred in 2012. the additional properties added were subsequently approved by the Metro Council and signed by Mayor Karl Dean. The zone regulates homeowners right to build a new home or garage, relocate buildings, create additions on homes or raze any buildings (in whole or part).
