= Belmont Preparatory High School =

Public school in New York City

Location
- 500 E Fordham Rd; Bronx, New York 10458; United States; 40°51′34″N 73°53′18″W

Information
- Type: Public
- Motto: Preparing students for the world of higher education
- Established: 2002
- School district: New York City Geographic District #10
- NCES School ID: 360008705182
- Principal: Hoek Choi
- Teaching staff: 29.89 (on an FTE basis)
- Grades: 9-12
- Enrollment: 396 (2021-2022)
- Student to teacher ratio: 13.25
- Campus: City: Large
- Colors: Purple, Gray, White and Black
- Mascot: Wildcats
- Website: www.belmontprephs.org

Belmont Preparatory High School, or Belmont Prep is a small school located within the Theodore Roosevelt Educational Campus, across the street from Fordham University, in the Belmont section of the Bronx, New York City.

As of the 2014–15 school year, the school had an enrollment of 418 students and 30.0 classroom teachers (on an FTE basis), for a student–teacher ratio of 13.9:1. There were 323 students (77.3% of enrollment) eligible for free lunch and 33 (7.9% of students) eligible for reduced-cost lunch.
