= Strawberry Mansion =

Strawberry Mansion may refer to:

- Strawberry Mansion (album), a 2021 album by Langhorne Slim
- Strawberry Mansion (film), a 2021 film directed and written by Albert Birney and Kentucker Audley
- Strawberry Mansion, Philadelphia, a neighborhood in Philadelphia, Pennsylvania
- Strawberry Mansion Bridge, in Fairmount Park, Philadelphia, Pennsylvania
- Strawberry Mansion High School, in Philadelphia, Pennsylvania
- Historic Strawberry Mansion, an historic house in Philadelphia, Pennsylvania
- Nannie Lee House, an historic house in Melbourne, Florida, also known as the Strawberry Mansion
