= Historic Strawberry Mansion =

Historic house in Pennsylvania, United States

Strawberry Mansion
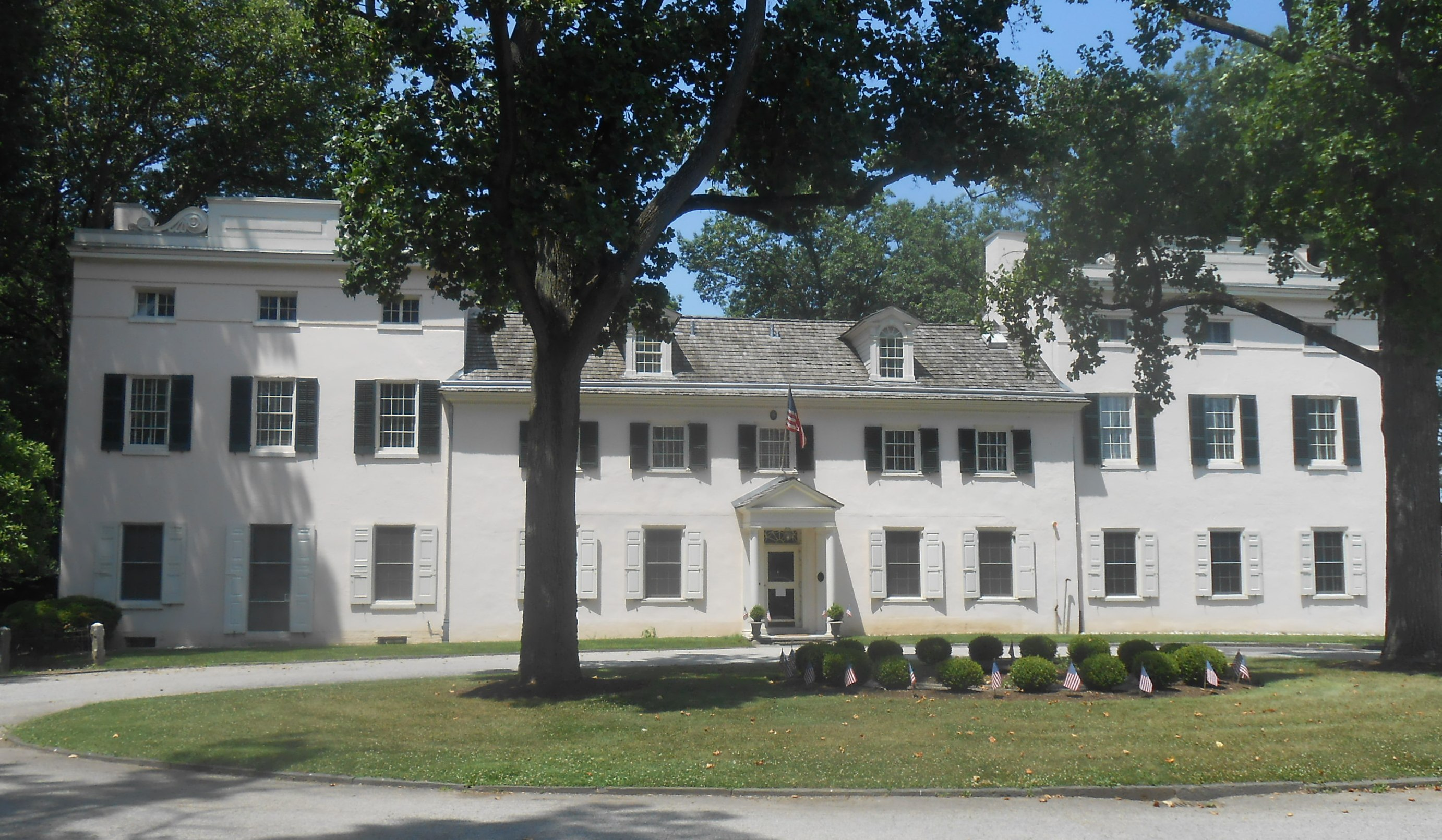
- Strawberry Mansion in 2014

- Location within Pennsylvania Location within the United States
- 39°59′40″N 75°11′26″W
- Location: Philadelphia, Pennsylvania

History
- Built: c. 1783–1789

Site notes
- Architectural style: Federal with Greek Revival wings

Philadelphia Register of Historic Places

Historic Strawberry Mansion is a summer home in East Fairmount Park, Philadelphia, Pennsylvania, United States. Built between 1783 and 1789 by Judge William Lewis, it was originally named Summerville.

== Early history ==
Lewis purchased land in what is now Fairmount Park, including some existing buildings, and built the mansion sometime between 1783 and 1789. He lived there until his death in 1819 at the age of 68.

Joseph Hemphill (born 1770) purchased Strawberry Mansion in 1821, two years after Lewis's death. His family was responsible for adding the Greek Revival wings to the Federal style structure erected by Lewis, c. 1828.

In 1867, the mansion was sold to the city by a landowner who had owned it since Hemphill's death in 1842. The purchase of the mansion, along with a great deal of the surrounding land, was part of an effort to protect the source of the city's drinking water, the Schuylkill River. The area was named East Fairmount Park, under the supervision of the Fairmount Park Commission.

== Renovations ==
In 1926, several women's clubs combined efforts with Mayor W. Freeland Kendrick to create a Sesquicentennial Exposition in South Philadelphia in honor of the 150th anniversary of the signing of the Declaration of Independence. Several women from the event did not want to disband, and instead sought an area to move many of the antique furniture collections to another location. Under the supervision of the Philadelphia Museum of Art and the Fairmount Park Commission, the new Committee of 1926 renovated Strawberry Mansion to be used as a museum and place of hospitality. Funds for the renovation were donated by Joseph Horn of Horn and Hardart's automats, who grew up in the Philadelphia area and played in the park as a child. Women's societies throughout the city filled the rooms with exceptional period furnishings. The house officially reopened in 1931 with Mrs. J. Willis Martin (Elizabeth Price) as the first president of the Committee of 1926. Today the Committee of 1926 continues to preserve the historic house museum and the principles of hospitality on which it was founded.

The mansion was renovated again in the early 21st century.

== Name ==
Between 1846 and 1867, Strawberry Mansion received its current name. It is believed that farmers occupying the mansion served strawberries and cream to the public.

== Tours ==
The mansion is open for tours from February to December, as follows:

- In February, tours are from 10 am to 4 pm on Saturdays and Sundays, by appointment only.
- In March, it is open from 10 am to 4 pm Thursday through Saturday and Sundays, by appointment only.
- In mid-April through December, the house is open Thursday through Sunday from 10 am to 4 pm. The last tour leaves promptly at 3 pm.

== See also ==
- List of houses in Fairmount Park
- Nannie Lee House aka Strawberry Mansion in Florida
- Strawberry Mansion (disambiguation)
- Strawberry Mansion Bridge
- Strawberry Mansion High School
- Strawberry Mansion, Philadelphia
