= Richard Peters (reporter) =

American attorney

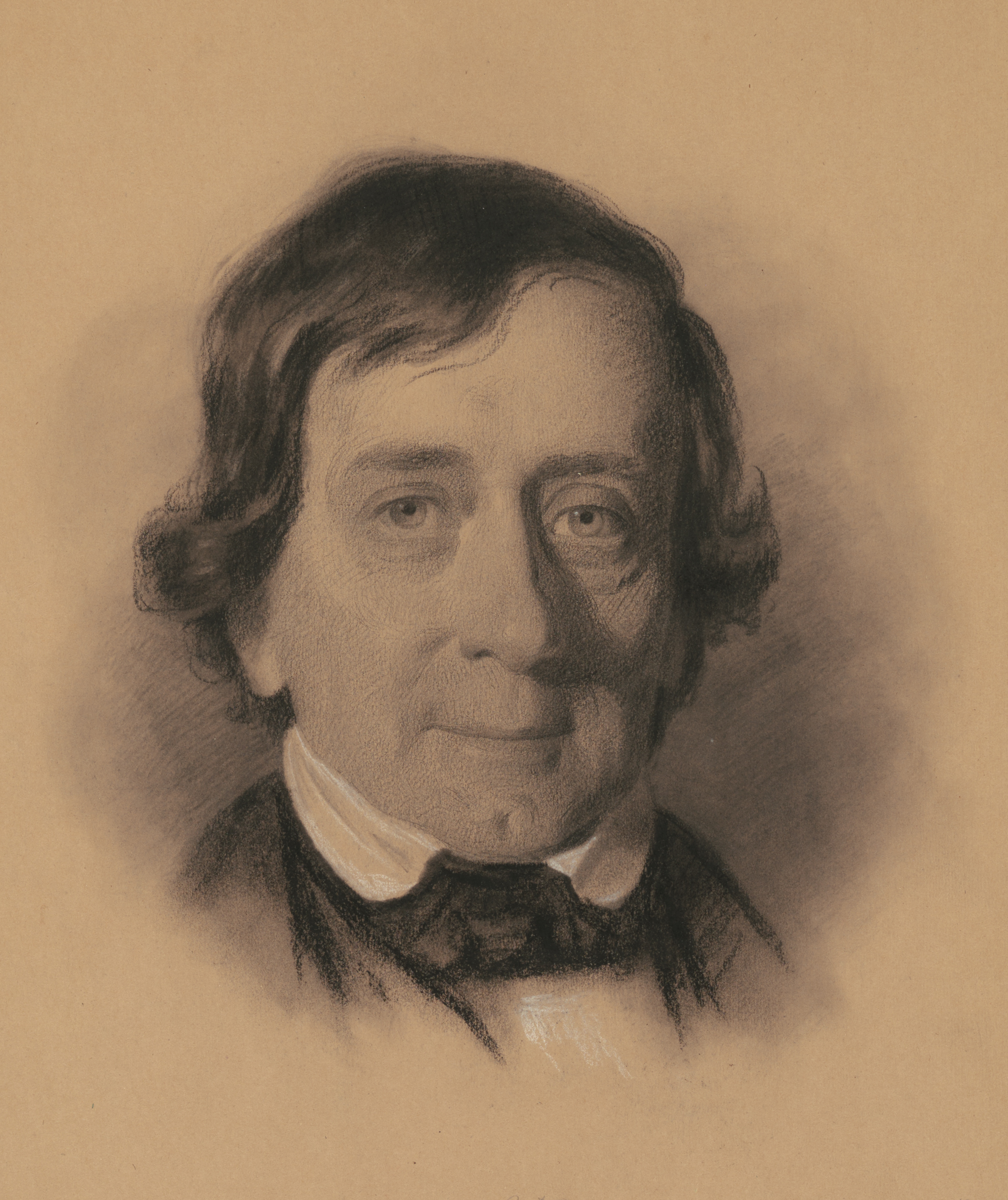
- Peters c. 1842

4th Reporter of Decisions of the Supreme Court of the United States
- In office 1828–1843
- Preceded by: Henry Wheaton
- Succeeded by: Benjamin Chew Howard

Solicitor of Philadelphia County, Pennsylvania
- In office 1822–1825

Personal details
- Born: Richard Peters Jr. August 17, 1780 Belmont, Pennsylvania, U.S.
- Died: May 2, 1848 (aged 67) Belmont, Pennsylvania, U.S.
- Spouse: Abigail Willing
- Parent: Richard Peters (father)
- Profession: Attorney

Richard Peters, Jr. (August 17, 1780 – May 2, 1848) was an American attorney and the fourth reporter of decisions of the Supreme Court of the United States, serving from 1828 to 1843.

== Early life ==
Richard Peters, Jr. was born in Belmont, Pennsylvania, the son of Richard Peters, an attorney later elected as Continental Congressman from Pennsylvania. Peters, Jr. studied law and was admitted to the bar in 1800.

== Career ==
In 1816, Peters was among a group of men led by Condy Raguet who founded the Philadelphia Savings Fund Society. In the early 20th century, it was the largest savings bank in the United States. Peters served as the editor of: Chitty on Bills, Joseph Chitty on Criminal Law (1819), Bushrod Washington's Circuit Court Reports, Third Circuit (four volumes, 1803–27), and United States Statutes at Large.

He was appointed as the solicitor of Philadelphia County, serving from 1822 to 1825.

=== Supreme Court ===
In 1828, Peters was appointed as Reporter of Decisions for the Supreme Court of the United States in Washington, DC. He condensed the reports of his three predecessors to have a more concise version for legal reviews. He eliminated the arguments of counsel, annotations, and other material, thereby reducing twenty-four volumes into six. His immediate predecessor Henry Wheaton sued. The Supreme Court rejected Wheaton's claim to a common law copyright in his own reports in the first landmark case in American copyright law, Wheaton v. Peters.

The Court dismissed Peters in 1843 because of the questionable "accuracy and fidelity" of his reports; in addition, he had offended several of the justices.

== Personal life ==
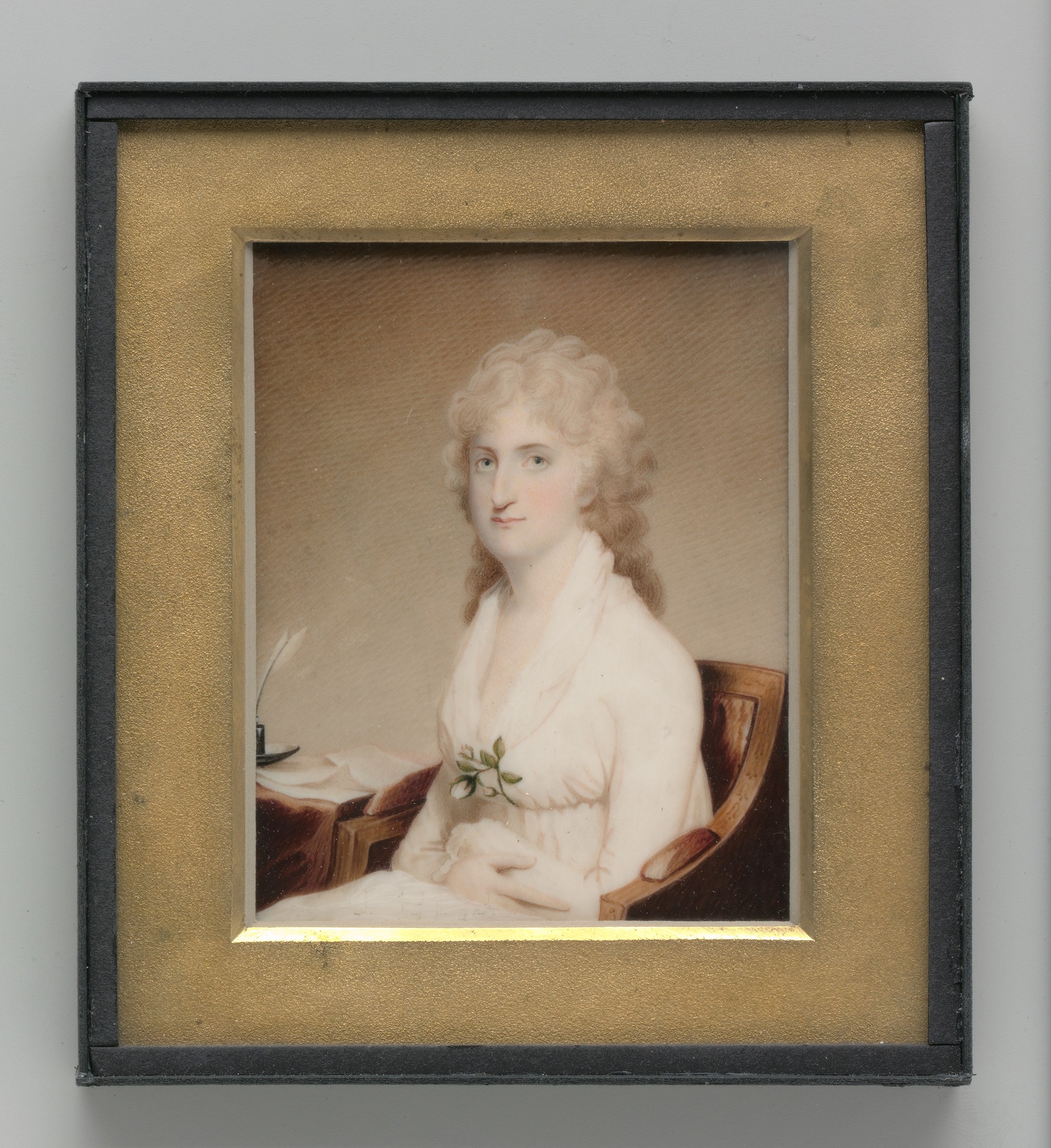
Peter's wife, Abigail Willing, painted by Archibald Robertson (c. 1803)

Peters was married to Abigail Willing (1777–1841), daughter of prominent Philadelphian Thomas Willing (1731–1821). Peters died in Belmont, Pennsylvania in 1848.

== Published works ==
- Reports of the United States Circuit Court, 1803-18 (1819);
- Reports of the United States Supreme Court, 1828-43 (seventeen volumes, 1828–43); *Condensed Reports of Cases in the United States Supreme Court from its Organization till 1827 (six volumes, 1835)

Legal offices
Preceded by Henry Wheaton	United States Supreme Court Reporter of Decisions; 1828–1843	Succeeded by Benjamin Chew Howard
