= Belmont District, Pennsylvania =

Belmont District
- Former District
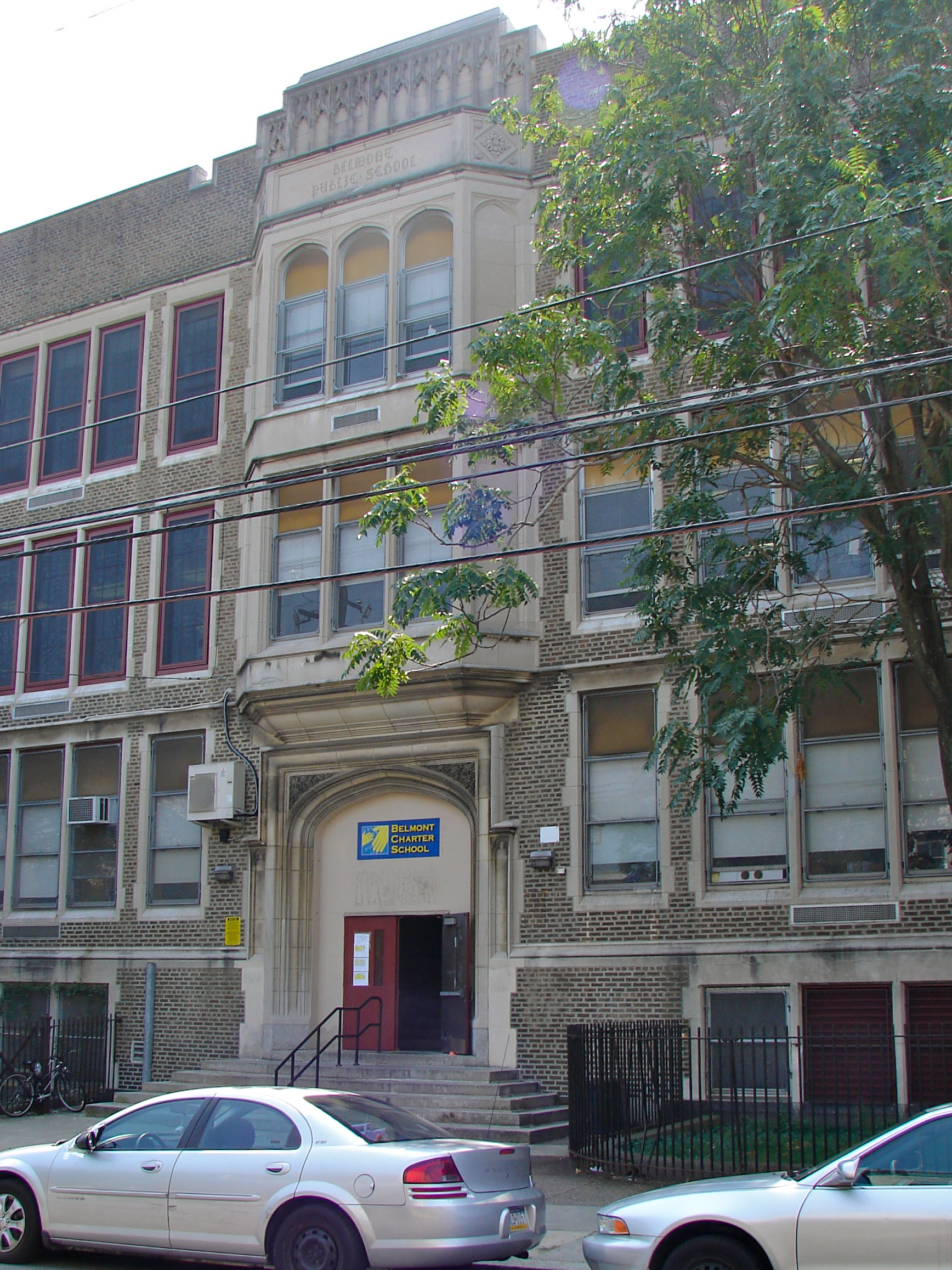
- Belmont School in Belmont, September 2010

- Location of Belmont District in Pennsylvania Belmont District (the United States)
- Coordinates: 39°58′0″N 75°12′18″W
- Country: United States
- State: Pennsylvania
- County: Philadelphia
- Time zone: UTC-5 (EST)
  - Summer (DST): UTC-4 (EDT)
- Area codes: 215, 267, and 445

Belmont District was a district that existed briefly in Philadelphia County, Pennsylvania, United States. The district was created on April 14, 1853 from northern Blockley Township ceased to exist and on February 2, 1854 the district was incorporated into the City of Philadelphia following the passage of the Act of Consolidation, 1854.

The name Belmont is still used as a neighborhood name for the area, although it no longer refers to any legal entity. Similar name-inheritance (where the name of a former municipality lives on as a neighborhood name without formal definition) is seen in other Philadelphia neighborhoods.

== History ==
Belmont District was created by act of the Assembly on April 14, 1853. It embraced the part of Blockley Township which lay along the Schuylkill River from the northern boundary-line of West Philadelphia to the northern boundary-line between Philadelphia and Montgomery counties, and had also its western boundary on that line. This district had scarcely time to be organized before the Act of Consolidation of February 2, 1854, put an end to its franchises.

The name was derived from Belmont, the country seat of the Peters family, which is now part of Fairmount Park. The mansion was erected by William Peters about 1743, and the name was descriptive of the fine position of the property and suggestive of the beautiful views of the river and valley of the Schuylkill. The property became the estate of Judge Richard Peters, Jr., of the United States District Court; he lived there until his death, August 22, 1828.

The Belmont School was added to the National Register of Historic Places in 1988.

== Sources ==
- Chronology of the Political Subdivisions of the County of Philadelphia, 1683–1854 (Daly, John; Weinberg, Allen (October 1966). Genealogy of Philadelphia County Subdivisions (Second ed.). Philadelphia Dept. of Records.)
- Information courtesy of ushistory.org
- Incorporated District, Boroughs, and Townships in the County of Philadelphia, 1854 By Rudolph J. Walther – excerpted from the book at the ushistory.org website
