= Thomas FitzSimons High School =

- Thomas Fitzsimons Junior High School
- U.S. National Register of Historic Places
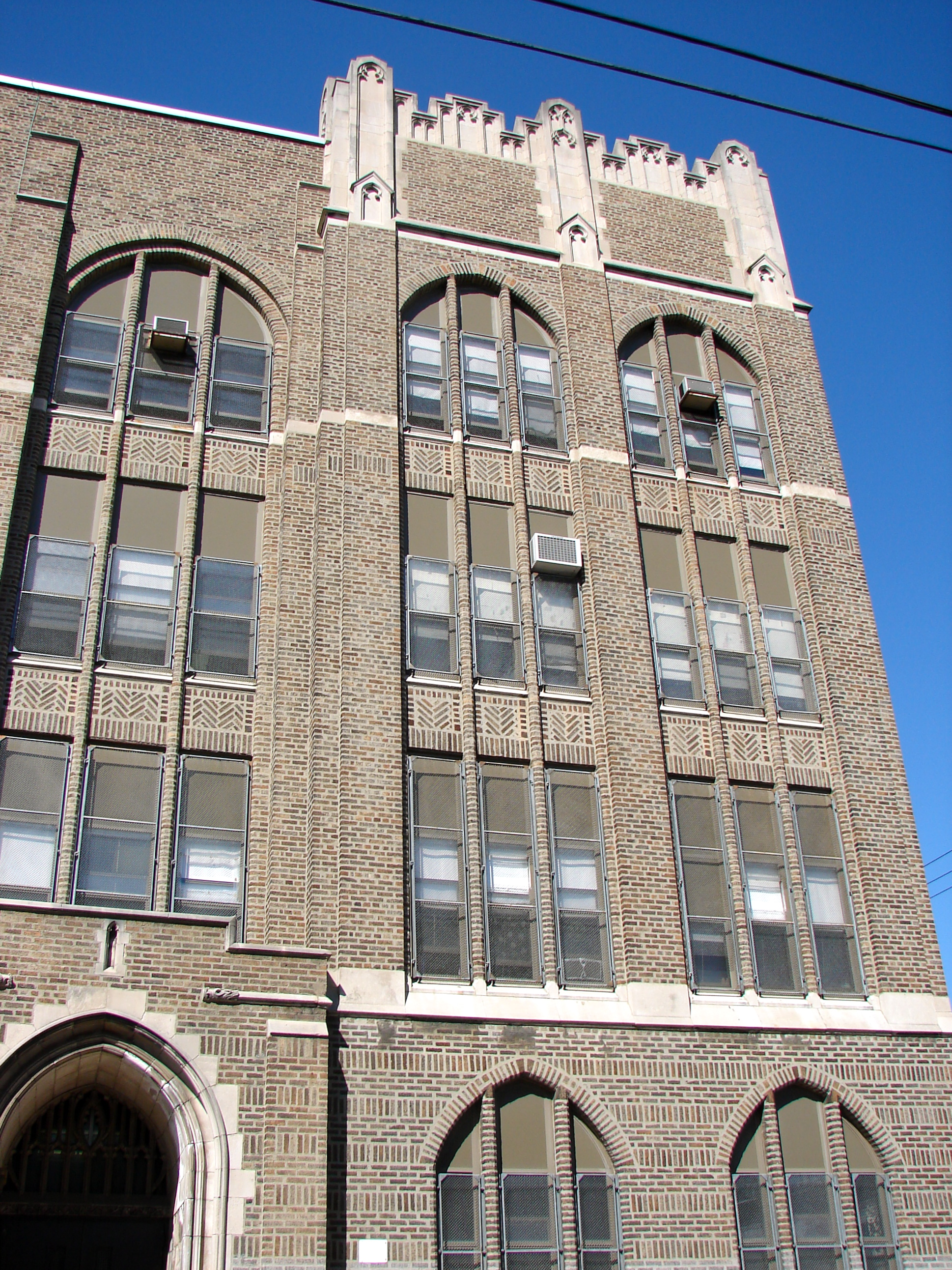
- FitzSimons High School

- Location within Philadelphia Location within Pennsylvania Location within the United States
- Location: 2601 W. Cumberland St., Philadelphia, Pennsylvania
- Coordinates: 39°59′37″N 75°10′31″W
- Area: 2.5 acres (1.0 ha)
- Built: 1926
- Built by: Cramp & Co.
- Architect: Catharine, Irwin T.
- Architectural style: Late Gothic Revival
- MPS: Philadelphia Public Schools TR
- NRHP reference No.: 88002272
- Added to NRHP: November 18, 1988

Thomas Fitzsimons Junior High School, later The Young Men's Leadership School at Thomas E. FitzSimons High School, was a public secondary school that, in its final years, was a secondary school for boys. It was located at 2601 West Cumberland Street in Philadelphia, Pennsylvania, United States and was a part of the School District of Philadelphia. The school was named after Thomas FitzSimons, who was a signer of the Constitution of the United States.

== History ==
The school building was designed by architect Irwin T. Catharine and built in 1926. It was added to the National Register of Historic Places in 1988 as the Thomas Fitzsimons Junior High School.

In September 2005, the Philadelphia School District converted FitzSimons Middle School, a coeducational middle school managed by Victory Schools Inc. since 2002, into an all-male middle and high school. During that year, the district established The Young Women’s Leadership School at E. Washington Rhodes High School for females. The males zoned to the former FitzSimons and Rhodes zones were assigned to FitzSimons, while the females in the zones were assigned to Rhodes. After the redesign, FitzSimons reported increases in assaults targeting students and teachers. Margaret Harrington, the chief operating officer of Victory, described FitzSimons as having a "transition problem." Martha Woodall of the Philadelphia Inquirer stated in a 2006 article that the boys assigned to FitzSimons had tension with the boys assigned to Rhodes and that tensions increased when the schools combined. Richard H. Jenkins Sr., the principal of FitzSimons, said in that Philadelphia Inquirer article that he began establishing order with the students as the 2005–2006 school year progressed.

Victory Schools was relieved of responsibility for the school; for the 2009–2010 school year, the school returned to the authority of Philadelphia Public Schools. At the end of the 2010–2011 school year, the Philadelphia School District relieved Principal Darryl C. Overton of his duties as the school transitioned from The Young Men's Leadership School at Thomas FitzSimons High School to Thomas FitSimons High School-Promise Academy. In August 2011, budgetary issues and political unrest within the Philadelphia School District negatively impacted the school's direction, and Thomas FitzSimons High School did not open as a Promise Academy. However, that school year, Thomas Fitzsimons High School operated as a comprehensive neighborhood high school, adopting some of the reform measures associated with the Promise Academy model. The new school, led by Principal Jafar Baraka, focused on re-shaping academic programing, highlighting gender-based education, systems building to address school safety and climate, and instructional rigor and parental partnerships. In the spring of 2012, Thomas FitzSimons High School earned AYP or " Adequate Yearly Progress" in two educational categories under the Safe Harbor designation for the first time since the adoption and implementation of the NCLB legislation of 2000.

During the summer of 2012, KIPP Du Bois Collegiate Academy, a charter high school that is part of the national KIPP network of charter schools, was housed in the Fitzsimons Building. In 2013, FitzSimons High School doors officially closed.

The students who were at Rhodes were reassigned to Strawberry Mansion High School.

=== Feeder schools ===
Feeder elementary schools included Thomas M. Peirce Elementary School, Anna B. Pratt School, John G. Whittier School, and Richard R. Wright School. Ethel Allen School, feeds into FitzSimons.
