= The Young Women's Leadership School at Rhodes High School =

Defunct high school in Pennsylvania, United States

Coordinates: 40.0026°N 75.1783°W

The Young Women's Leadership School at E. Washington Rhodes High School was a public secondary school for girls located at 3100 North 29th Street in Philadelphia, Pennsylvania, United States. The school was a part of the School District of Philadelphia.

== History ==
In September 2005 the School District of Philadelphia converted Rhodes Middle School, a coeducational middle school, into an all-female middle and high school. During that year the district established The Young Men's Leadership School at Thomas FitzSimons High School for males. The males zoned to the former FitzSimons and Rhodes zones were assigned to FitzSimons, while the females in the zones were assigned to Rhodes. After the redesign Rhodes reported a smooth transition.

In March 2012, the Philadelphia School Reform Commission voted to turn Rhodes back into a co-educational middle school. The students were reassigned to Strawberry Mansion High School. The Rhodes campus now serves as a K-8 school.

== Transportation ==
SEPTA serves the school with Routes 32, 48, and 60.

== Feeder patterns ==
Feeder elementary schools included Thomas M. Peirce Elementary School, Anna B. Pratt School, John G. Whittier School, and Richard R. Wright School. Ethel Allen School, a K-8 school, fed into Rhodes.

== School uniforms ==
Rhodes students were required to wear school uniforms.
