= Richard Peters (priest) =

English priest

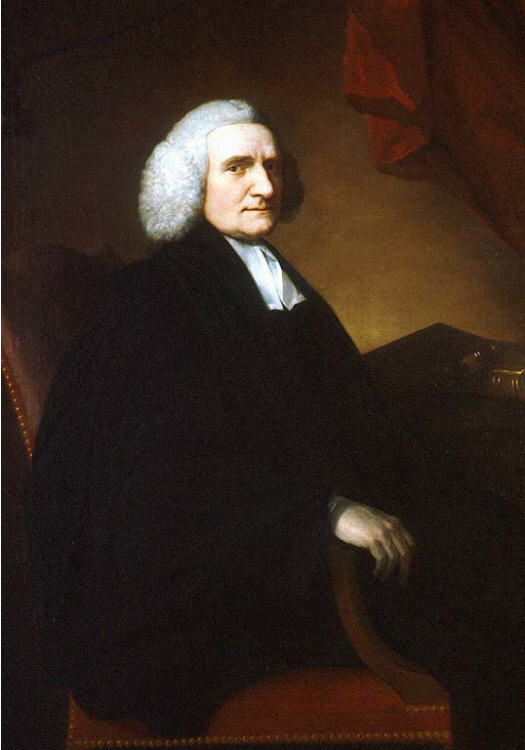
Portrait by Mason Chamberlin

Richard Peters (1704 – July 10, 1776), born in Liverpool became an attorney, Anglican minister, and civil servant. In 1735 he emigrated to Pennsylvania, where he served in numerous posts for the Penn family, including on the Governor's Council from 1749 to 1775, and eventually became rector of Christ Church in Philadelphia.

== Early life and education ==
Richard Peters was born in Liverpool, England, where his father, Ralph Peters, was an attorney and the Town Clerk. He was educated at Westminster School and continued at the Dutch University of Leyden for additional studies. He read law at the Middle Temple and became ordained in the Church of England. He later undertook further studies at Wadham College, Oxford.

== Marriage and family ==
Peters married a servant girl of Westminster. They later separated.

In 1734, believing that his first wife was dead, Peters remarried. A bigamy scandal arose when his first wife reappeared. The following year, he emigrated from Liverpool to exile in the colonies, settling in Philadelphia. His brother William Peters also immigrated to Philadelphia.

== Emigration and years in Philadelphia ==
Peters became an assistant at Christ Church in Philadelphia, the major city of the Pennsylvania colony, and served there for two years. He directly worked for the Penn proprietary family as Secretary of the Land Office, Secretary of the Province and Clerk of the council. He held these positions for a quarter of a century, and in 1749 was also appointed to the Governor's Council, serving until the Revolution.

In 1754, Peters was among several men appointed to the Pennsylvania delegation for the Albany Congress, a meeting in Albany, New York of more than 20 colonial representatives to discuss plans for defense in the face of French threat in the Seven Years' War, which front in North America was known as the French and Indian War. He recommended adoption of Benjamin Franklin's Albany Plan, an early proposal to create a unified colonial government. It was rejected by colonial assemblies and the British Board of Trade alike.

In 1762 Peters retired from the proprietary offices to his "Belmont" estate, as he made a sufficient fortune. He was called as rector of Christ Church, and served until his health forced him to resign in September 1775. Throughout these years, he was active in many religious, civic, and educational affairs.

He was the first person Benjamin Franklin spoke with (in 1743) about establishing a public academy. Six years later Franklin enlisted Peters to be part of initial founding board of trustees for the College of Philadelphia (which in 1791 became known as University of Pennsylvania) where Peters was (a) one of the founding Trustees in 1749, (b) served as President of the school's Board of Trustees from 1756 to 1764, and (c) also served for two years as its Treasurer.

Peters also served as a director of the Library Company of Philadelphia (1750-1764), a manager of Pennsylvania Hospital (1751–1752), and a member of the American Philosophical Society (1769–1776).

Peters died in Philadelphia in 1776.

His brother William had also emigrated to Pennsylvania. He named his son Richard after his brother; the boy was later known as Richard Peters Jr. to distinguish him from his uncle. Richard Peters Jr. (1744-1828) would represent Pennsylvania in the Continental Congress and later was appointed as a U.S. District Court judge in Philadelphia.
