= List of federal judges appointed by George Washington =

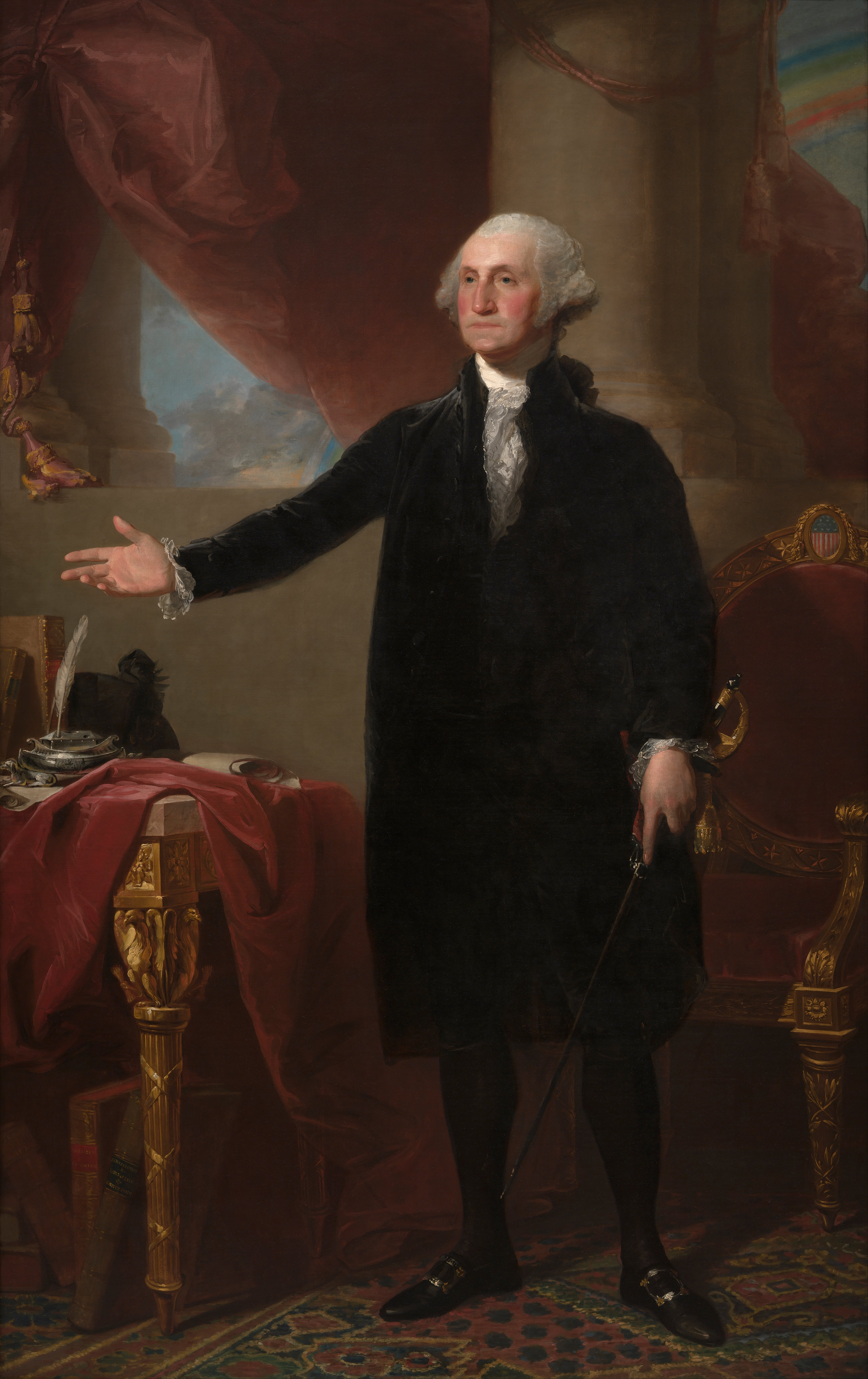
President George Washington appointed 9 justices to the Supreme Court and 28 judges to United States district courts.

United States President George Washington appointed 39 Article III United States federal judges during his presidency, which lasted from April 30, 1789, to March 4, 1797. The first group of Washington's appointments—two justices of the Supreme Court of the United States and ten district court judges—began service two days after Congress passed the Judiciary Act of 1789, which formally established the federal judiciary. Washington's last court appointee received his commission twelve days before the end of Washington's presidency.

As the first president, Washington was responsible for appointing the entire Supreme Court; he appointed a record eleven justices, including two Chief Justices who were confirmed from outside the Court, and one former Justice named as Chief Justice by a recess appointment, but not ultimately confirmed to the position. Additionally, Washington nominated Robert H. Harrison, who declined to serve, and nominated William Cushing for elevation to Chief Justice, who likewise declined. (Note: Some documents claim that he accepted the appointment and immediately resigned.)

Since there were no sitting justices at the beginning of Washington's term, he had the unique opportunity to fill the entire body of United States federal judges with his selections. Despite this, Washington appointed only 28 judges to the United States district courts, due to the smaller size of the judiciary at the time; there were far fewer states, most states had a single district court, and each district had a single judge assigned to it. Because intermediate federal appellate courts had not yet been established, this, combined with the Supreme Court appointments, constituted the total number of federal judicial appointments made by Washington. The number is roughly 10% of the record 376 judges appointed by Ronald Reagan from 1981 to 1989, when the judiciary was much larger, (Note: The Biographical Directory of Federal Judges lists 358 judges appointed by President Reagan, with reappointments and elevations bringing the number to 376.) and less than 5% of the number of active federal judges serving as of July 2010. (Note: The Biographical Directory of Federal Judges lists close to 800 judges in active status, with nearly to 500 more in senior status.) Richard Peters Jr. served for over 36 years, the longest of Washington's appointments.

Washington appointed a small number of Article IV territorial judges. He appointed Samuel Holden Parsons, John Cleves Symmes, George Turner and Rufus Putnam to the court of the Northwest Territory, Putnam being appointed to fill the vacancy caused by the death of Parsons. He appointed David Campbell, John McNairy and Joseph Anderson to the court of the Southwest Territory. After the Southwest Territory was admitted to the union as the State of Tennessee, McNairy would go on to serve as its first United States District Judge.

As no Article I legislative courts existed during Washington's administration, he made no judicial appointments under Article I. The first court created under Article I, the United States Court of Claims, would not be established until 1855, under the administration of President Franklin Pierce.

Additionally, the District of Columbia judiciary would not exist until the passage of the District of Columbia Organic Act of 1801 under President John Adams.

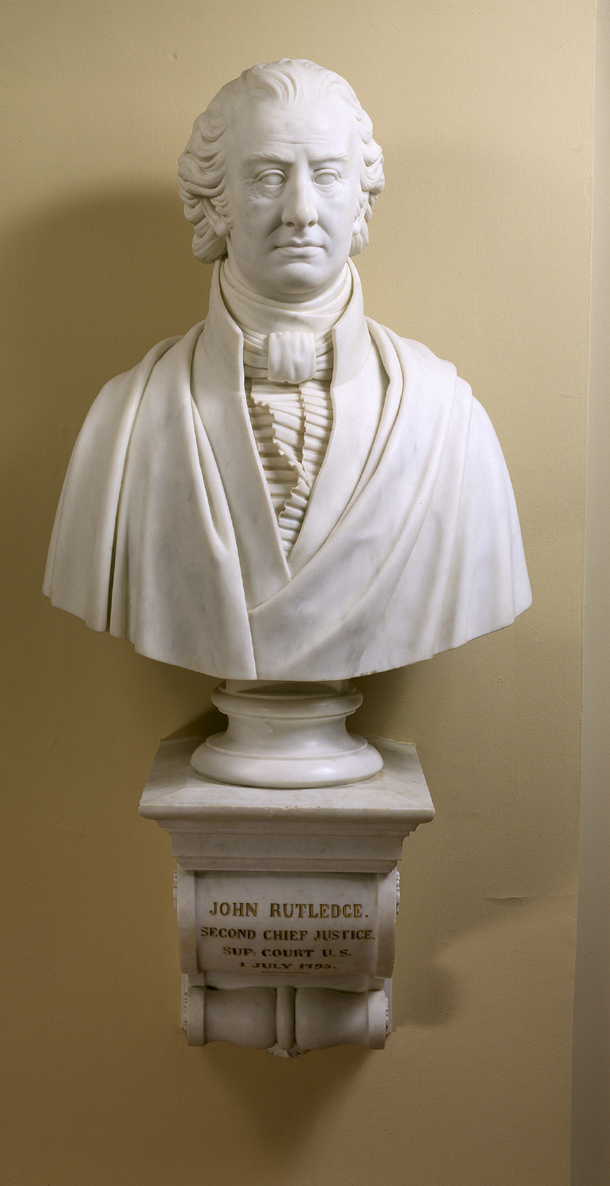
John Rutledge was appointed to the serve on the Supreme Court twice, first as associate justice and then, after a period of years off the Court, as chief justice.

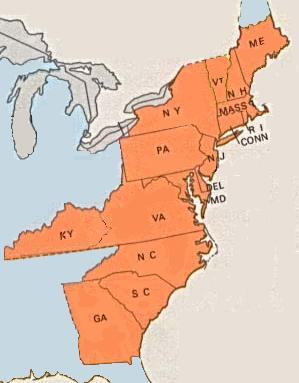
Washington appointed federal judges to 17 United States District Courts. Of these, 16 are pictured in the map above, while the 17th, the District of Tennessee, was created shortly before the end of his administration.

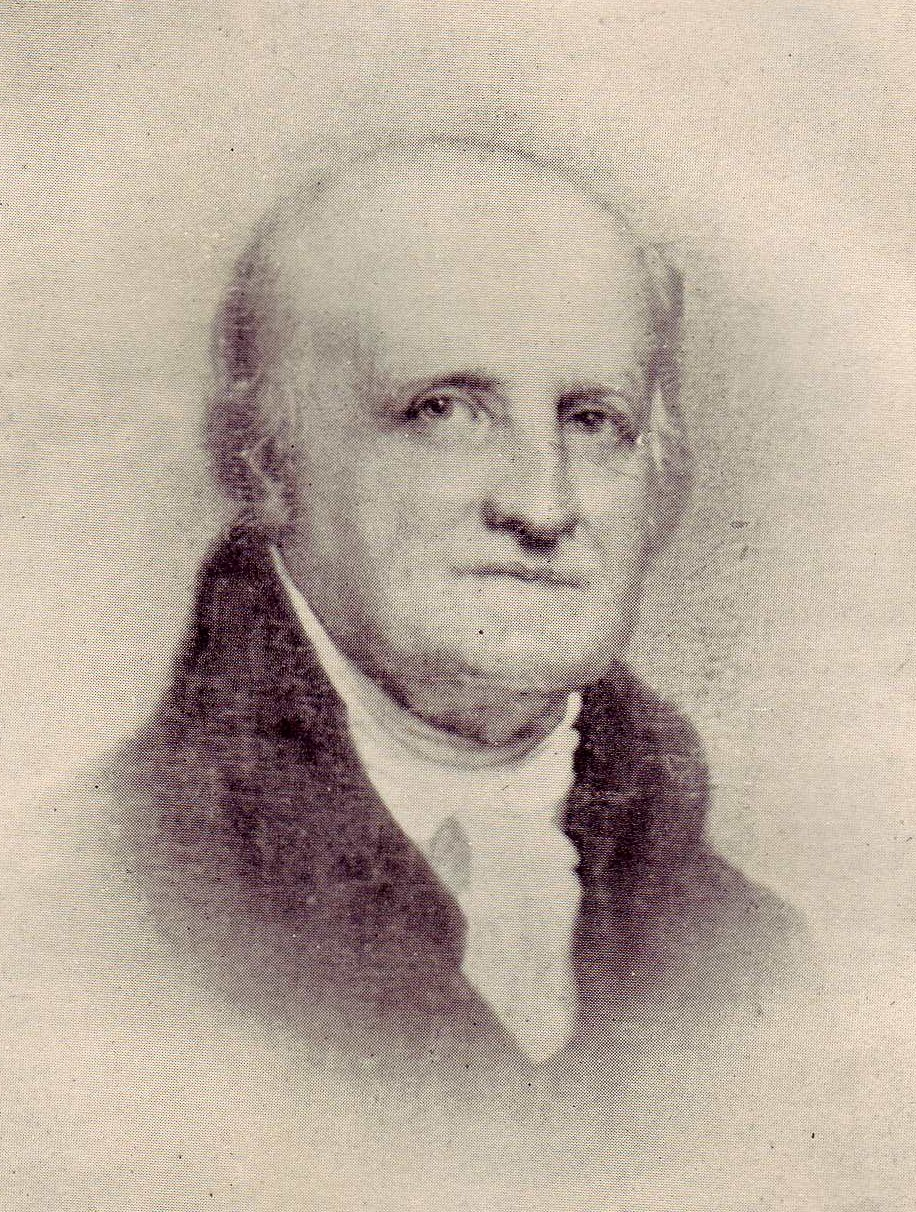
Richard Peters Jr. served on the U.S. District Court for the District of Pennsylvania for over 36 years, the longest of Washington's appointments.

== United States Supreme Court justices ==
#	Justice	Seat	State	Former justice	Nomination date	Confirmation date	Began active service	Ended active service
1	John Jay	Chief	New York	Seat established	September 24, 1789	September 26, 1789	September 26, 1789	June 29, 1795
2	John Rutledge	1	South Carolina	Seat established	September 24, 1789 (Note: Unusually, Rutledge served two different terms on the Supreme Court. He was first appointed as an Associate Justice in 1789, resigning from that position in 1791. He became Chief Justice via a recess appointment in 1795, and was formally nominated on December 10, 1795. His nomination was thereafter rejected by the Senate in December 1795, and he resigned shortly after.)	September 26, 1789	September 26, 1789	March 5, 1791
2.1	John Rutledge	Chief	South Carolina	John Jay	December 10, 1795	–	July 1, 1795	December 28, 1795
3	William Cushing	2	Massachusetts	Seat established	September 24, 1789	September 26, 1789	September 27, 1789	September 13, 1810
4	James Wilson	3	Pennsylvania	Seat established	September 24, 1789	September 26, 1789	September 29, 1789	August 21, 1798
5	John Blair Jr.	4	Virginia	Seat established	September 24, 1789	September 26, 1789	September 30, 1789	October 25, 1795
6	James Iredell	5	North Carolina	Seat established	February 8, 1790	February 10, 1790	February 10, 1790	October 20, 1799
7	Thomas Johnson	1	Maryland	John Rutledge	October 31, 1791	November 7, 1791	August 5, 1791	January 16, 1793
8	William Paterson	1	New Jersey	Thomas Johnson	March 4, 1793 (Note: Paterson was initially nominated on February 27, 1793, but the nomination was immediately withdrawn by the President for technical reasons, the message being received by the Senate on Feb 28, 1793. Paterson was successfully renominated four days later.)	March 4, 1793	March 4, 1793	September 9, 1806
9	Samuel Chase	4	Maryland	John Blair Jr.	January 26, 1796	January 27, 1796	January 27, 1796	June 19, 1811
10	Oliver Ellsworth	Chief	Connecticut	John Rutledge	March 3, 1796	March 4, 1796	March 4, 1796	December 15, 1800

== District courts ==
#	Judge	Court (Note: See List of United States district and territorial courts)	Nomination date	Confirmation date	Began active service	Ended active service
1	Gunning Bedford Jr.	D. Del.	September 24, 1789	September 26, 1789	September 26, 1789	March 30, 1812
2	David Brearley	D.N.J.	September 25, 1789	September 25, 1789	September 26, 1789	August 16, 1790
3	James Duane	D.N.Y.	September 25, 1789	September 25, 1789	September 26, 1789	March 17, 1794
4	Francis Hopkinson	D. Pa.	September 24, 1789	September 26, 1789	September 26, 1789	May 9, 1791
5	Harry Innes	D. Ky.	September 24, 1789	September 26, 1789	September 26, 1789	September 20, 1816
6	Richard Law	D. Conn.	September 24, 1789	September 26, 1789	September 26, 1789	January 26, 1806
7	John Lowell	D. Mass.	September 24, 1789	September 26, 1789	September 26, 1789	February 20, 1801
8	Nathaniel Pendleton	D. Ga.	September 24, 1789	September 26, 1789	September 26, 1789	September 1, 1796
9	David Sewall	D. Me.	September 24, 1789	September 26, 1789	September 26, 1789	January 9, 1818
10	John Sullivan	D.N.H.	September 24, 1789	September 26, 1789	September 26, 1789	January 23, 1795
11	William Drayton Sr.	D.S.C.	February 8, 1790	February 10, 1790	November 18, 1789	May 18, 1790
12	Cyrus Griffin	D. Va.	February 8, 1790	February 10, 1790	November 28, 1789	December 14, 1810
13	William Paca	D. Md.	February 8, 1790	February 10, 1790	December 22, 1789	October 13, 1799
14	Thomas Bee	D.S.C.	June 11, 1790	June 14, 1790	June 14, 1790	February 18, 1812
15	Henry Marchant	D.R.I.	July 2, 1790	July 3, 1790	July 3, 1790	August 30, 1796
16	John Stokes	D.N.C.	August 2, 1790	August 3, 1790	August 3, 1790	October 12, 1790
17	Robert Morris	D.N.J.	December 17, 1790	December 20, 1790	August 28, 1790	June 2, 1815
18	John Sitgreaves	D.N.C.	December 17, 1790	December 20, 1790	December 20, 1790	March 4, 1802
19	Nathaniel Chipman	D. Vt.	March 4, 1791	March 4, 1791	March 4, 1791	January 1, 1793
20	William Lewis	D. Pa.	October 31, 1791	November 7, 1791	July 14, 1791	January 4, 1792
21	Richard Peters	D. Pa.	January 12, 1792	January 13, 1792	January 12, 1792	August 22, 1828
22	Samuel Hitchcock	D. Vt.	December 27, 1793	December 30, 1793	September 3, 1793	February 20, 1801
23	John Laurance	D.N.Y.	May 5, 1794	May 6, 1794	May 6, 1794	November 8, 1796
24	John Pickering	D.N.H.	February 10, 1795	February 11, 1795	February 11, 1795	March 12, 1804
25	Joseph Clay Jr.	D. Ga.	December 21, 1796	December 27, 1796	September 16, 1796	May 12, 1801
26	Benjamin Bourne	D.R.I.	December 21, 1796	December 22, 1796	October 13, 1796	February 20, 1801
27	Robert Troup	D.N.Y.	December 9, 1796	December 10, 1796	December 10, 1796	April 4, 1798
28	John McNairy	D. Tenn.	February 17, 1797	February 20, 1797	February 20, 1797	September 1, 1833

== Notes ==
Renominations

== See also ==
- John Rutledge Supreme Court nominations
