= Strawberry Mansion, Philadelphia =

Strawberry Mansion
- Neighborhood of Philadelphia
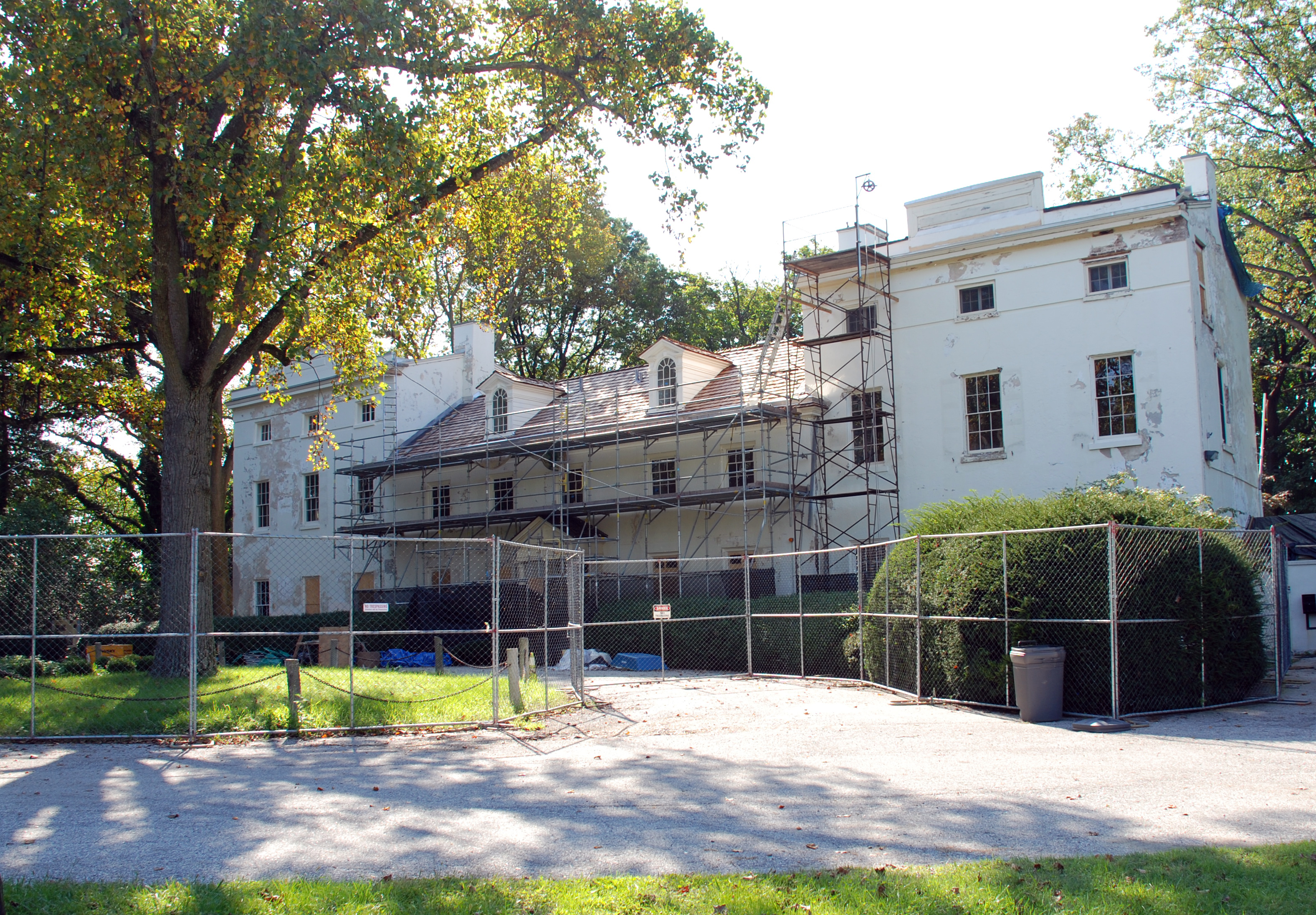
- Strawberry Mansion, under restoration in 2009, is located adjacent to the Strawberry Mansion community

- Location within Philadelphia
- Country: United States
- State: Pennsylvania
- County: Philadelphia
- City: Philadelphia
- Area codes: 215, 267, and 445

Strawberry Mansion is a neighborhood in the U.S. city of Philadelphia, Pennsylvania, located east of Fairmount Park in North Philadelphia. The neighborhood is bounded by 33rd Street to the west, 29th Street to the east, Lehigh Avenue to the north, and Oxford Street to the south. As of the 2000 census, the neighborhood had a population of 22,562. It is often associated with the historic house of the same name, Historic Strawberry Mansion, located adjacent to the neighborhood and generally thought to be the source of the community's name.

== History ==
Formerly known as Summerville, the neighborhood takes its name from a house known as Strawberry Mansion, at one time housing a restaurant known for strawberries and cream. Strawberry Mansion was home to a number of Philadelphia's wealthiest families in the 19th century. In 1880, the average home price was higher than 85% of the houses in Philadelphia.

=== 19th century ===
The Jewish community started in the late 1890s, as the community migrated from Northern Liberties and Fairmount. After the turn of the century, many Jews living in South Philadelphia moved to then-greener neighborhoods of the city.

=== 20th century ===
The first synagogue in the neighborhood was Beth Israel, which moved in 1909 from Eighth and Jefferson to 32nd and Montgomery. In 1913, a real estate broker placed an ad in the Philadelphia Jewish Herald encouraging Jews to leave South Philadelphia's Jewish quarter and move to the “fresh air” and “beautiful country landscape” of Strawberry Mansion. At its height, about one-fifth of the Jewish population in the city lived in the enclave between Lehigh and Oxford streets, and 29th and 33rd streets. The Jews built a community, and eventually left for Oxford Circle, Overbrook Park, and West Oak Lane-Mt. Airy. There were at least 21 synagogues in the neighborhood, built for the most part in the first quarter of the 20th century. By 2015, six of the buildings remained and had been transformed into churches.

The 1950s and 1960s brought an economic decline and urban decay.

=== 21st century ===
In 2000, the neighborhood had the lowest average home price in the city. Modern Strawberry Mansion has acquired a reputation as one of the most dangerous areas of Philadelphia. The neighborhood is quite large in area and in population and has been grossly neglected by police. A number of stately park-side homes in varying states of disrepair can be found in what was once one of the wealthiest areas in Philadelphia.

Strawberry Mansion has also been home to horses and urban cowboys for generations. One local group, the Fletcher Street Urban Riding Club, provides activities and support to neighborhood children in the struggling area. A notable mural, "A Tribute to Urban Horsemen," can be viewed from the community garden on Montgomery Avenue near 33rd st.

In 2015, it was announced that public access would be restored to the perimeter of a fallow basin of the East Park Reservoir in the first phase of a program to expand youth programs within the park. Then-Mayor Michael Nutter was quoted in ceremony, "What's demonstrated here today is that Strawberry Mansion will become the melting pot of the City of Philadelphia." Neighborhood residents eagerly await removal of the chain-link fence and barbed wire. The change is a significant expansion of the park side amenities afforded to neighborhood residents and the city, reflecting the wave of redevelopment in the area and renewed efforts to improve Fairmount Park.

== Community boundaries ==
The community is bounded by Fairmount Park to the west, Lehigh Avenue to the north, Sedgley Avenue and the SEPTA rail tracks to the east, and Cecil B. Moore Avenue to the south. Bordering neighborhoods include Allegheny West to the north, Glenwood and Stanton to the east, and Brewerytown to the south.

== Population ==
As of 2010, Strawberry Mansion was 94.3% black or African American, 2.3% white or European American, 1.6% Hispanic, 0.8% Asian, and 1% all other.

== Education ==
The School District of Philadelphia serves Strawberry Mansion.

Strawberry Mansion High School is in the neighborhood.

The high school and the area middle school shared a building with a third school, Leslie P. Hill Elementary School, which was a K-8 school, until it was closed in 2013. Many children, prior to the close, attended elementary, junior, and high schools without leaving the building. Now the neighborhood school that feeds into SMHS is James G. Blaine at 30th and Berks.

In 2015, a music recording studio opened at Strawberry Mansion High School financed by popular recording artist Drake.

The historic Most Precious Blood School was also located in the neighborhood.

== Notable people ==
- John Coltrane, musician and composer. The John Coltrane House, currently owned by his cousin, is designated a National Historic Landmark
- Mary Dee, radio broadcaster
- Larry Fine, comedian and member of the Three Stooges
- Meek Mill, rapper
- Ronald Murray, professional basketball player
- Allen Rosenberg, rower and rowing coach
- Sandy Stewart, singer and entertainer
- Jazmine Sullivan, Grammy award-winning singer and songwriter

== See also ==
- Historic Strawberry Mansion
- Strawberry Mansion Bridge
