= William Lewis (judge) =

American judge (1752–1819)

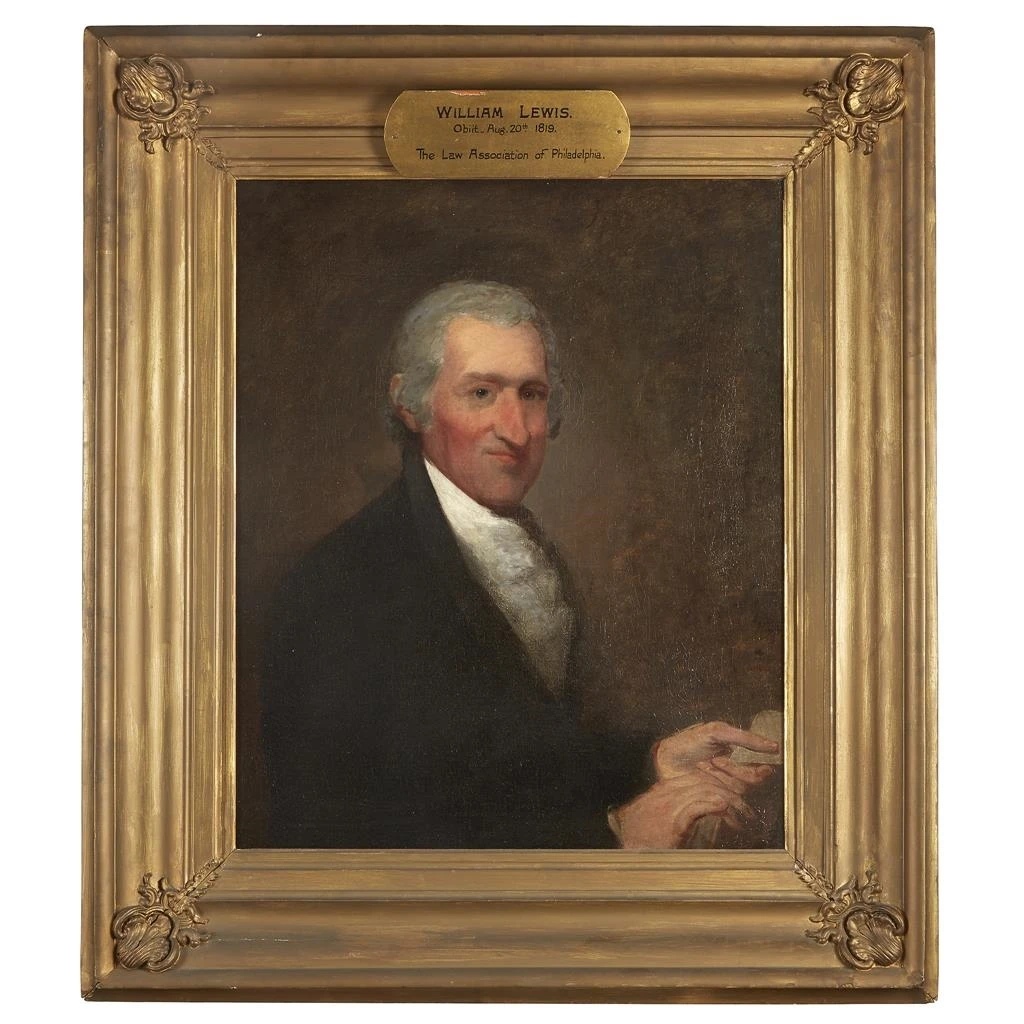

Judge of the United States District Court for the District of Pennsylvania
- In office July 14, 1791 – January 4, 1792
- Appointed by: George Washington
- Preceded by: Francis Hopkinson
- Succeeded by: Richard Peters

Personal details
- Born: January 22, 1752 Edgemont, Province of Pennsylvania, British America
- Died: August 16, 1819 (aged 67) Philadelphia, Pennsylvania
- Education: read law

William Lewis (January 22, 1752 – August 16, 1819) was a United States Attorney for the District of Pennsylvania and a United States district judge of the United States District Court for the District of Pennsylvania.

== Education and career ==
Born on January 22, 1752, in Edgemont, Province of Pennsylvania, British America, Lewis read law in 1773. He entered private practice in Philadelphia, Province of Pennsylvania (State of Pennsylvania, United States from July 4, 1776) from 1773 to 1787. He was a member of the Pennsylvania House of Representatives from 1787 to 1789. He was the United States Attorney for the District of Pennsylvania from 1789 to 1791.

=== Anti-slavery legislation ===
Lewis was involved in the drafting and passage of An Act for the Gradual Abolition of Slavery in 1780. This legislation was the first legal action towards the abolition of slavery in the United States of America.

== Federal judicial service ==
Lewis received a recess appointment from President George Washington on July 14, 1791, to a seat on the United States District Court for the District of Pennsylvania vacated by Judge Francis Hopkinson. He was nominated to the same position by President Washington on October 31, 1791. He was confirmed by the United States Senate on November 7, 1791, and received his commission the same day. His service terminated on January 4, 1792, due to his resignation.

== Later career and death ==
Following his resignation from the federal bench, Lewis resumed private practice in Philadelphia from 1792 to 1817. During that time, he represented people who were accused of treason during the Whiskey Rebellion, including one habeas case at the United States Supreme Court called United States v. Hamilton. He died on August 16, 1819, in Philadelphia.

== Other accomplishments and residence ==
Lewis is also known for advising Alexander Hamilton on the first national bank and building the Historic Strawberry Mansion in Philadelphia's Fairmount Park in 1789. At the time the house was known as Summerville. Lewis died peacefully at Summerville, at the age of 68. The house was converted into a historic house museum in 1931.

== Sources ==
- Historic Strawberry Mansion Official Website

Legal offices
Preceded by Francis Hopkinson	Judge of the United States District Court for the District of Pennsylvania; 1791–1792	Succeeded by Richard Peters
