= Belmont Charter School =

- Belmont School
- U.S. National Register of Historic Places
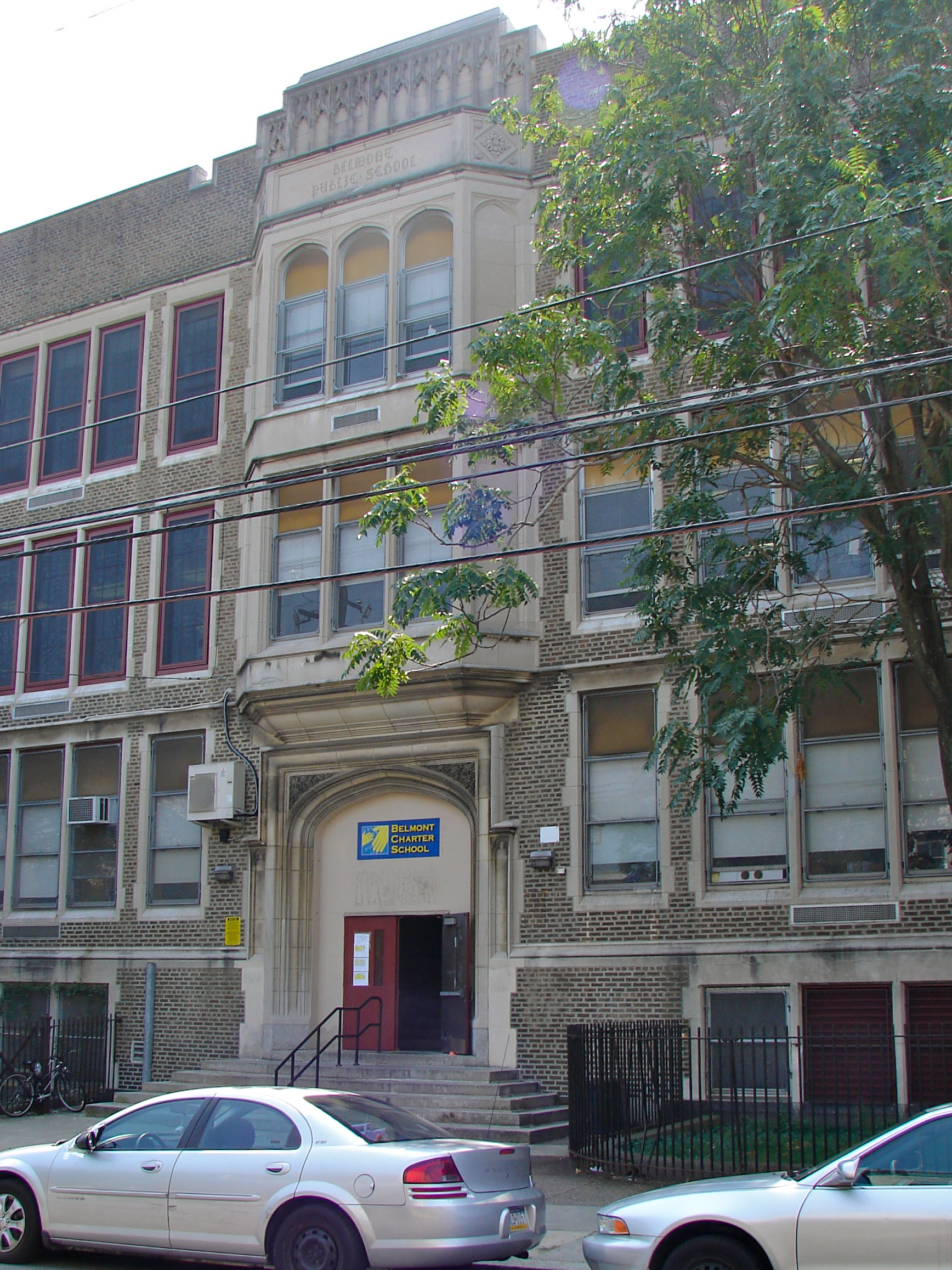
- Belmont School, September 2010

- Location within Philadelphia Location within Pennsylvania Location within the United States
- Location: 4030 Brown St., Philadelphia, Pennsylvania, United States
- Coordinates: 39°58′0″N 75°12′18″W
- Area: 3 acres (1.2 ha)
- Built: 1927
- Architect: Irwin T. Catharine
- Architectural style: Late Gothic Revival
- MPS: Philadelphia Public Schools TR
- NRHP reference No.: 88002245
- Added to NRHP: November 18, 1988

The Belmont Charter School is a historic school building located in the Belmont neighborhood of Philadelphia, Pennsylvania, United States.

It was added to the National Register of Historic Places in 1988.

== History and architectural features ==
The building was designed by Irwin T. Catharine and built in 1927. It is a three-story, brick building, which was erected on a raised basement and designed in the Late Gothic Revival-style. It features a two-story, projecting stone bay window over the main entrance.

== Belmont Charter Network ==
Since 2002, the school has been used as the Belmont Charter Elementary School, a Grades 1-5 school in the Belmont Charter Network. Other schools in the network include:

- Belmont Academy Charter School (PK-K)
- Inquiry Charter School (PK-5)
- Belmont Charter Middle School (6-8)
- Belmont Charter High School (9-12)
