= Belmont Mansion (Philadelphia) =

Historic house in Pennsylvania, United States

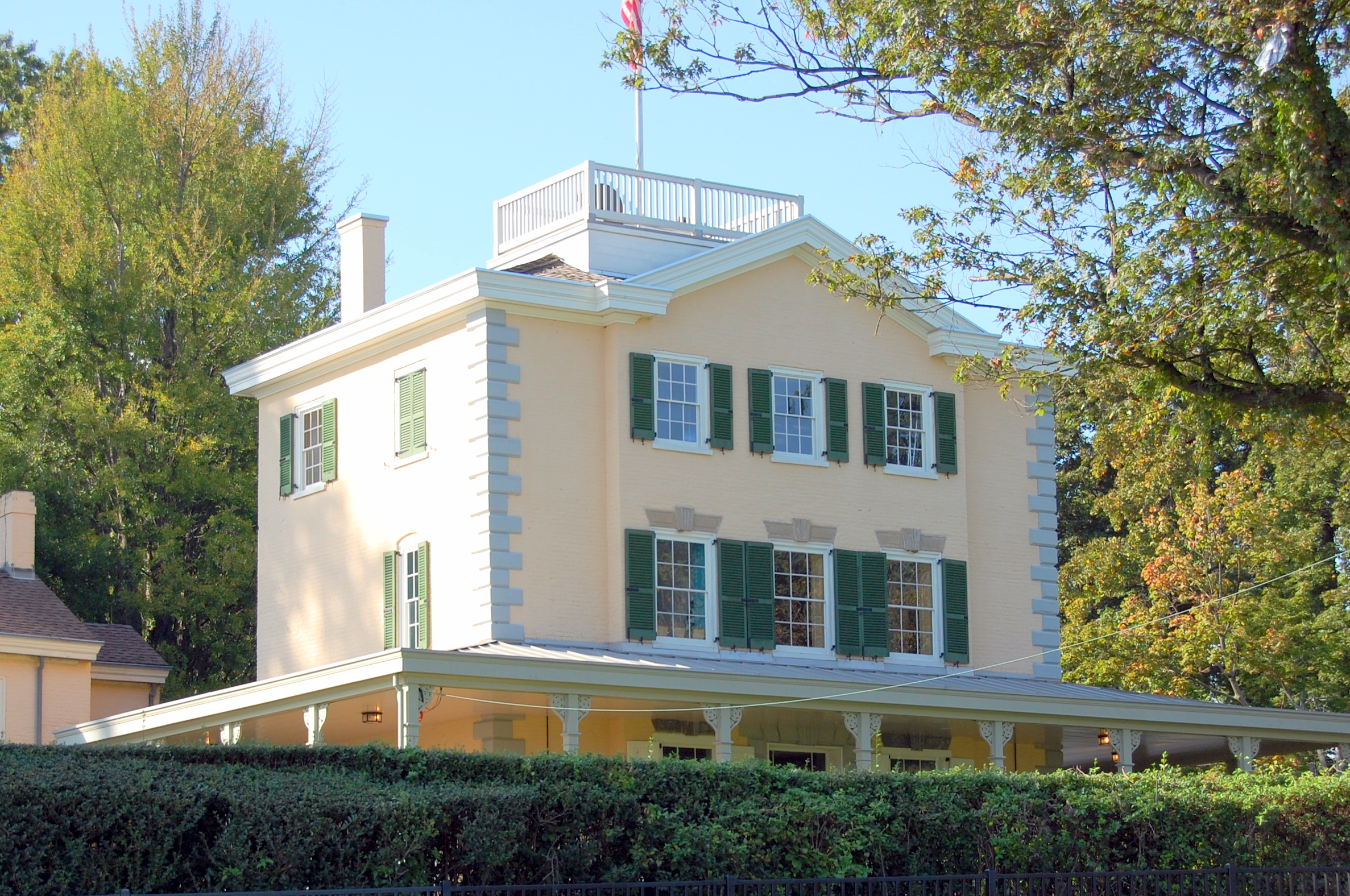
- Belmont Mansion in 2009
- Location: Philadelphia
- Coordinates: 39°59′27″N 75°12′47″W
- Public transit access: SEPTA bus: 38
- Website: http://www.belmontmansion.org

Philadelphia Register of Historic Places
- Designated: June 26, 1956

Belmont Mansion is a historic mansion located in Fairmount Park in Philadelphia. Built in the early 18th century, the mansion is one of the finest examples of Palladian architecture in the United States. Since 2007, the mansion has hosted the Underground Railroad Museum.

== Construction ==
William Peters, an English lawyer and land management agent for the Penn family, bought the property, then a group of farms, in 1742. Peters designed and built the mansion in 1745 and planted formal gardens around it.

== During the American Revolution ==
As the American Revolution approached, the estate passed to William's son, Richard Peters, Jr., who had been born there. Richard served as Speaker of the Pennsylvania Assembly, Pennsylvania State Senator and Judge of the United States District Court. An amateur scientist, he operated the estate farm as a working model of scientific agriculture.

Many prominent figures in the Revolution stayed at the mansion at this time, including George Washington, John Adams, Thomas Jefferson, and James Madison.

== Part of Fairmount Park ==
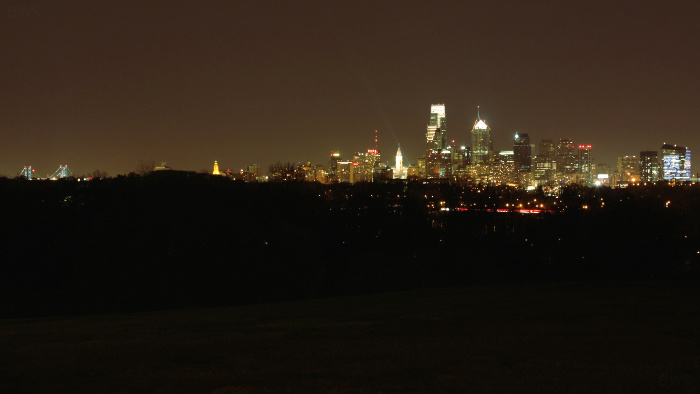
City skyline at night from mansion

The property became part of Fairmount Park in 1869 as part of a program to preserve the quality of the water supply. In anticipation of the Philadelphia Centennial Exposition in 1876, a large dining pavilion was built alongside the mansion. Belmont was added to the Philadelphia Register of Historic Places, June 26, 1956. The site continued to be used for public entertaining until it became a historic house museum under the management of the American Women's Heritage Society in 1986. The complex is also available for special events and rentals.

In June 2007, the Underground Railroad Museum was opened at the mansion.

The mansion lends its name to the surrounding neighborhood of Belmont.

== See also ==
- List of houses in Fairmount Park
