= Most Precious Blood Roman Catholic Church, Rectory and Parochial School =

Historic church in Pennsylvania, United States

- U.S. National Register of Historic Places
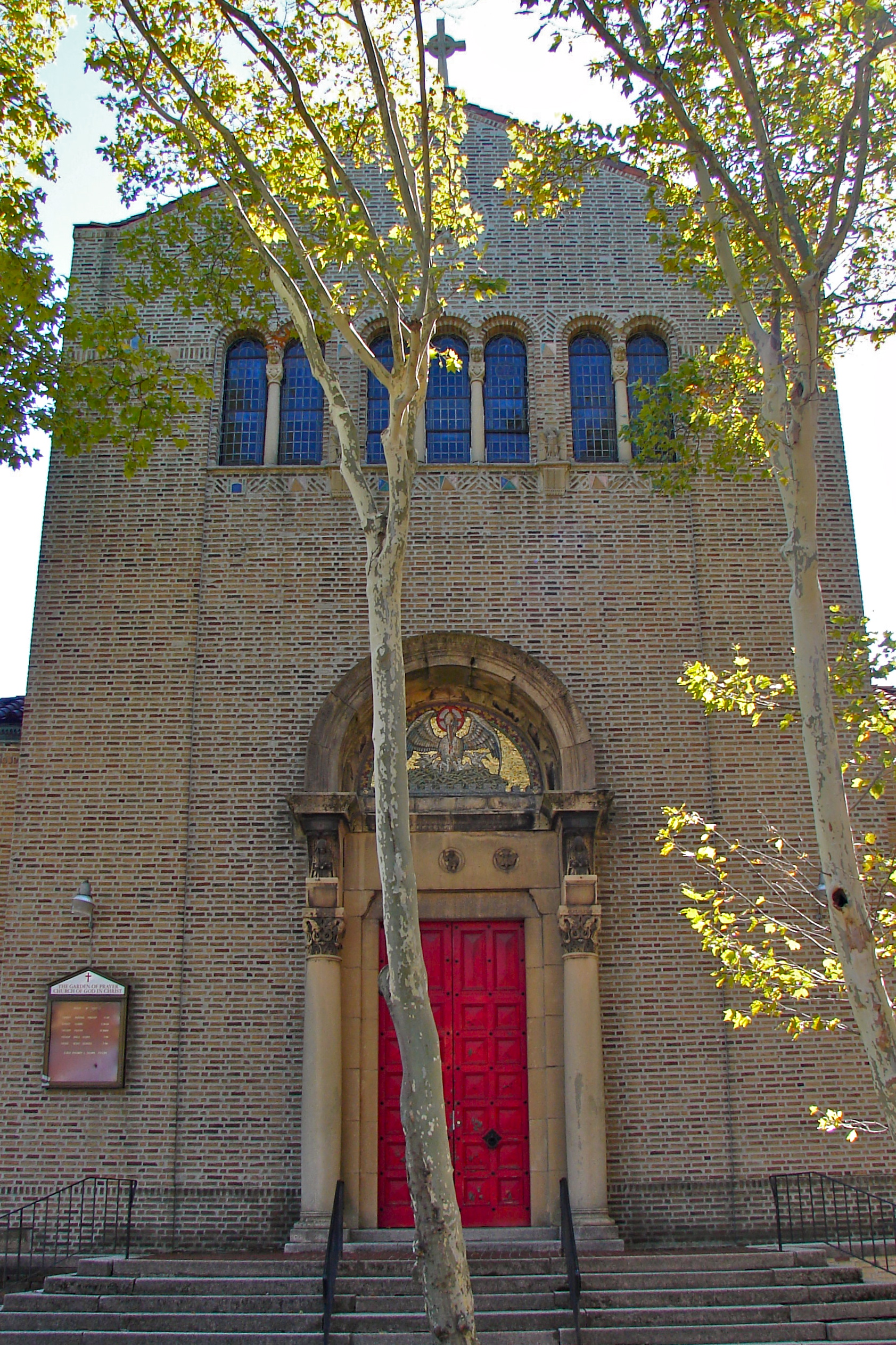
- Most Precious Blood Roman Catholic Church, September 2010

- Location within Philadelphia Location within Pennsylvania Location within the United States
- Location: 2800–2818 Diamond St., Philadelphia, Pennsylvania
- Coordinates: 39°59′15″N 75°10′46″W
- Area: 0.5 acres (0.20 ha)
- Built: 1908-1927
- Architect: Multiple
- Architectural style: Mission/Spanish Revival
- NRHP reference No.: 91002008
- Added to NRHP: January 22, 1992

Most Precious Blood Roman Catholic Church, Rectory and Parochial School is a historic Roman Catholic Church complex located at 2800–2818 Diamond Street in the Strawberry Mansion neighborhood of Philadelphia, Pennsylvania. The school was built between 1908 and 1912, the rectory in 1914, and the church between 1924 and 1927.

It was added to the National Register of Historic Places in 1992. It was demolished in 2023.
