= Nannie Lee House =

Coordinates: 28.079474°N 80.602088°W

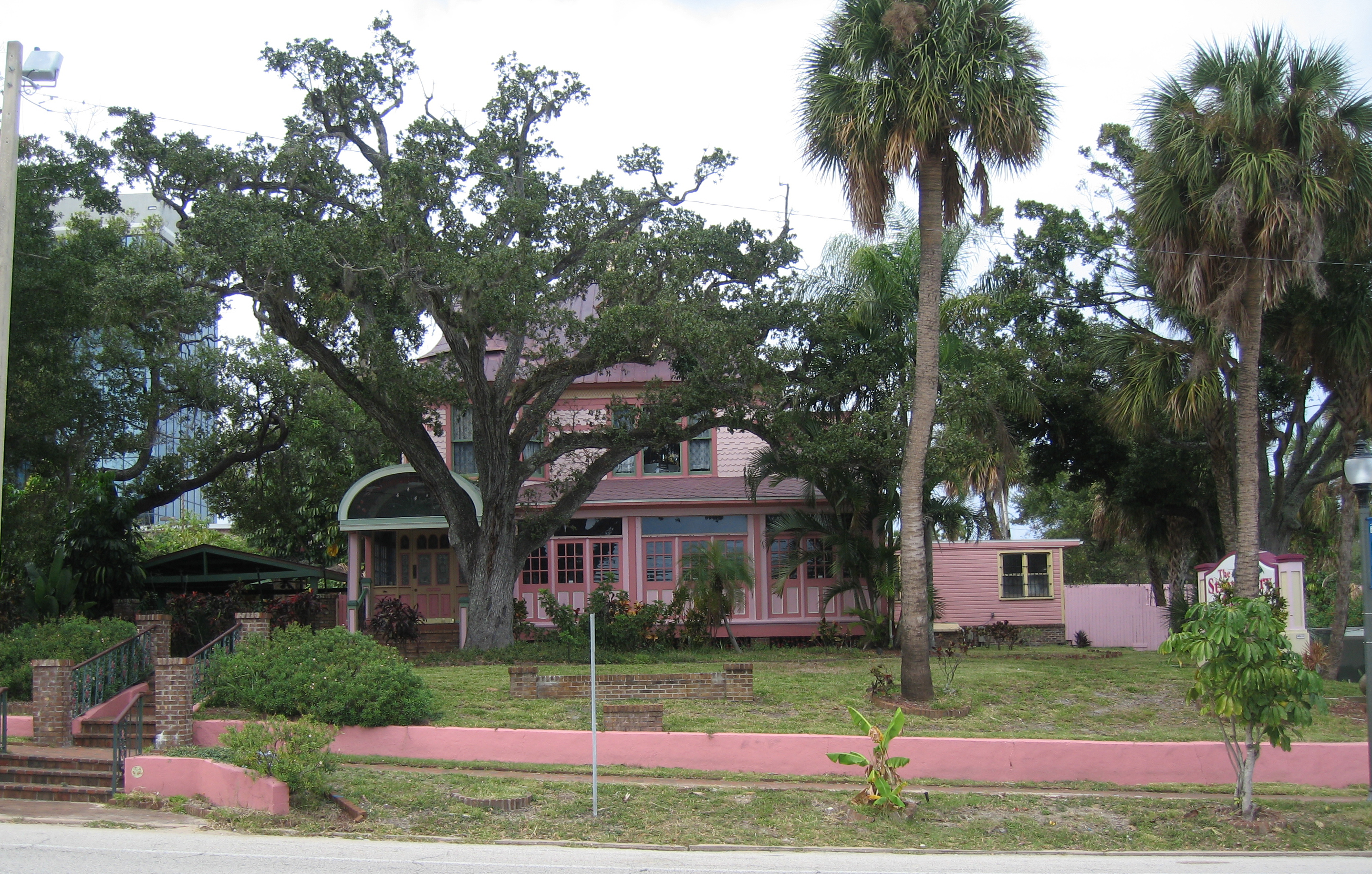
- Interactive map of the Nannie Lee House area

General information
- Type: Wood
- Architectural style: Queen Anne
- Location: 1218 East New Haven Avenue; Melbourne, Florida
- Construction started: About 1905

Technical details
- Floor count: 2

The Nannie Lee House, often referred to as Strawberry Mansion, is a historic U.S. home located at 1218 East New Haven Avenue, Melbourne, Florida. John B. Lee and his wife Nannie McBride Lee from Albion, New York built the house in 1905. Lily Tidwell, adopted granddaughter of Nannie Lee, inherited the house in 1929, and her family lived there for many years. The house served as a restaurant called The Strawberry Mansion from 1981 until 2007.

The house and attached buildings were sold in 2010. DiGiacinto purchased the property and changed it to a food business called "The Mansion of Melbourne" in 2011.

Local urban legend alleges the house as haunted with vague reports of paranormal activity, but no concrete documentation supports the claim.

== See also ==
- Historic Strawberry Mansion in Philadelphia
