= William Peters (lawyer) =

American lawyer

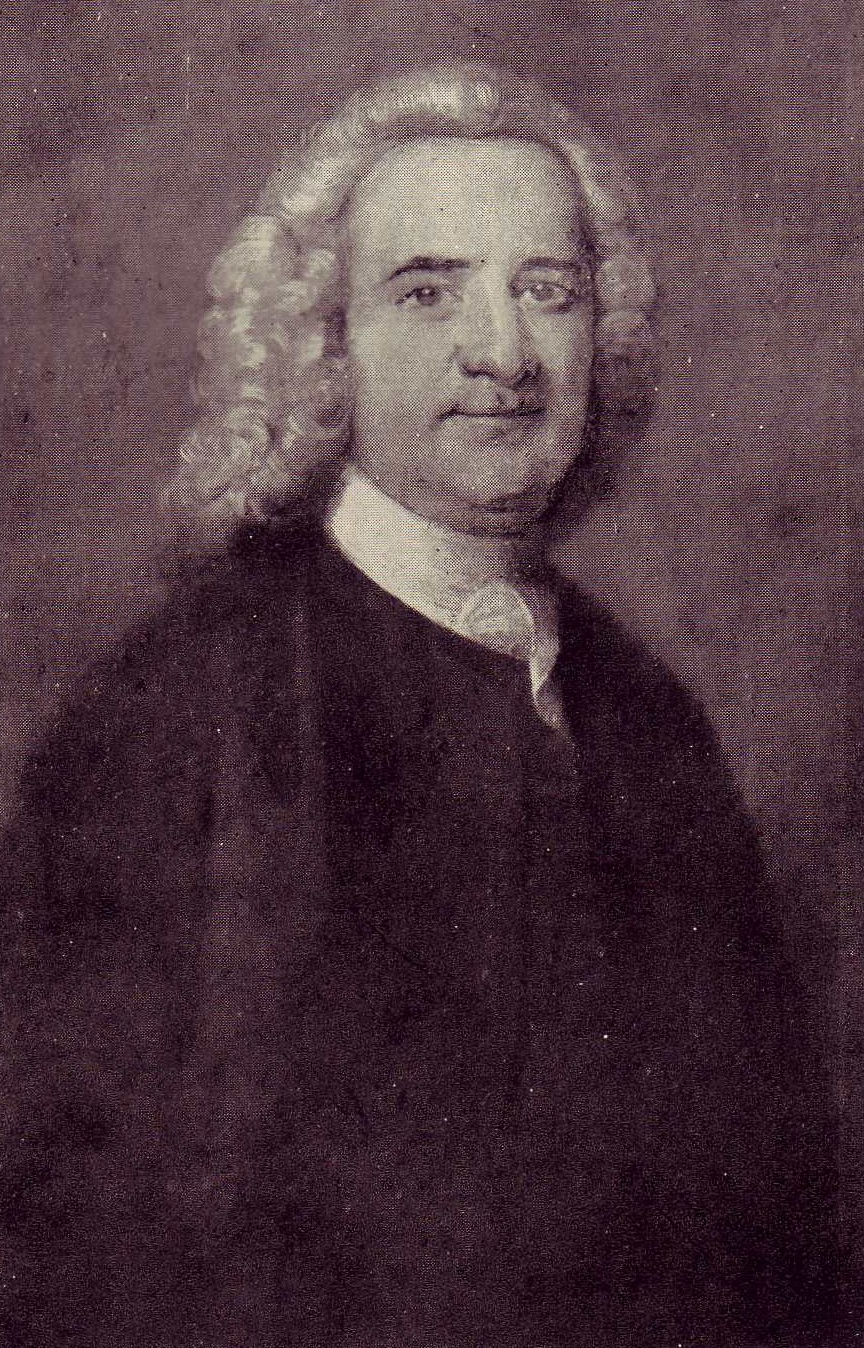
- Born: 1702; Liverpool, England
- Died: September 8, 1789 (aged 86–87); Knutsford, Cheshire
- Siglum: Coat of Arms of William Peters.svg
- Occupations: Lawyer, jurist
- Notable work: Belmont Mansion (Philadelphia)

Coat of Arms

William Peters (1702–1786) was lawyer and jurist in Philadelphia in the colonial and revolutionary era. Peters was known for building the Belmont Mansion, which remains a landmark in Philadelphia's Fairmount Park.

== Biography ==
Peters was born in Liverpool, England, and emigrated to America in 1739, where he opened a law practice. Upon arrival in Philadelphia, Peters gained the patronage of Thomas Penn. He would go to serve as judge of the courts of common pleas, quarter sessions, and orphans' court.

In July 1742 he purchased 220-acres on the west side of the Schuylkill River. There, he would build the Belmont Mansion, where he would devote considerable time to as an amateur architect.

In 1760, Thomas Penn allowed William Peters to follow his brother as secretary of the Pennsylvania Land Office. Over the next five years in the role, Peters' conduct and considerable time away from the city to develop his estate led to a rift with Thomas Penn. He returned to England in 1768, three years after being dismissed by Penn. Peters left his Belmont estate in the care of his son, Richard Peters

Today, the Belmont Mansion still stands in Philadelphia's Fairmount Park. Today the mansion is the site of the city's Underground Railroad museum.

== See also ==
- Reverend Richard Peters, brother
- William Peters House
