= Richard Peters (judge) =

American judge

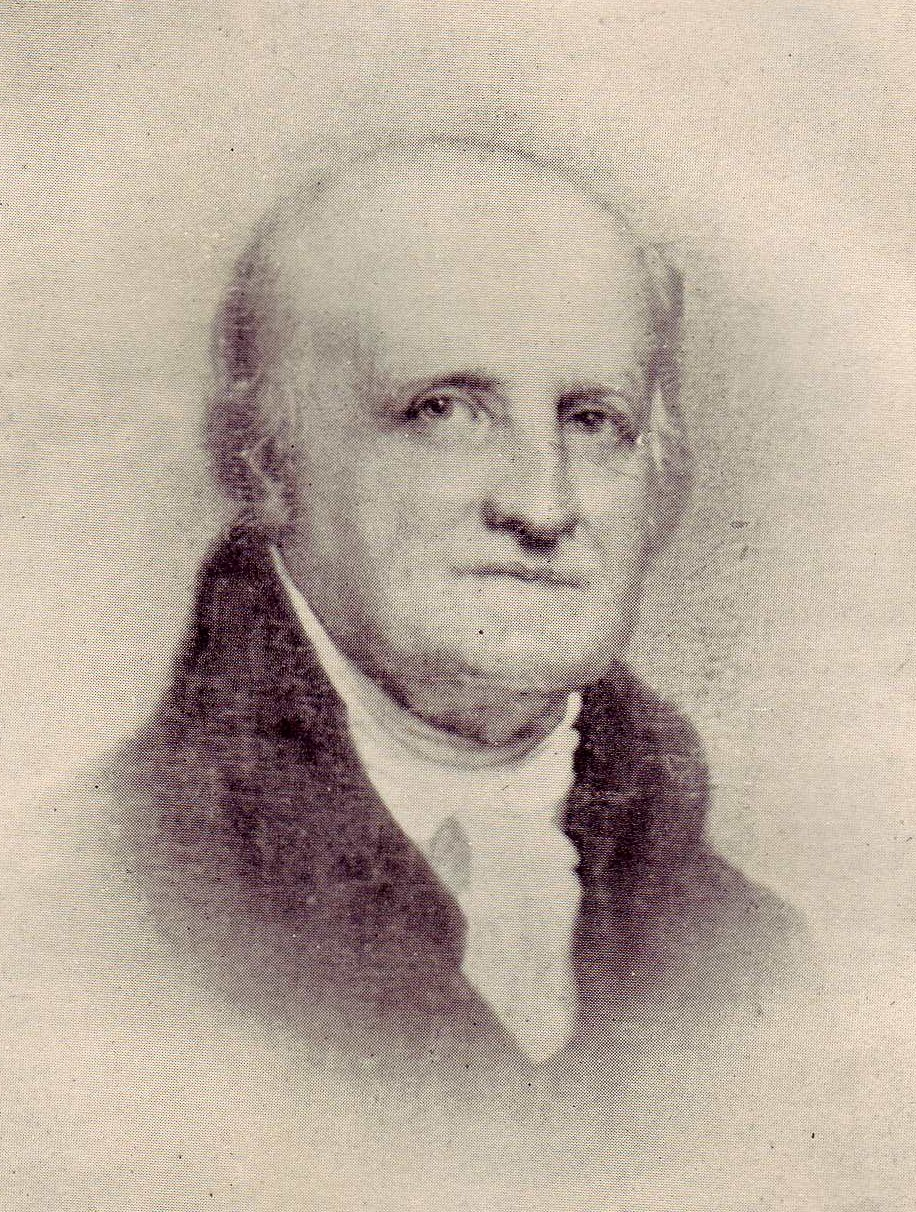

Judge of the United States District Court for the Eastern District of Pennsylvania
- In office April 20, 1818 – August 22, 1828
- Appointed by: operation of law
- Preceded by: Seat established by 3 Stat. 462
- Succeeded by: Joseph Hopkinson

Judge of the United States District Court for the District of Pennsylvania
- In office January 13, 1792 – April 20, 1818
- Appointed by: George Washington
- Preceded by: William Lewis
- Succeeded by: Seat abolished

Personal details
- Born: Richard Peters; June 22, 1744 Philadelphia, Province of Pennsylvania, British America
- Died: August 22, 1828 (aged 84) Philadelphia, Pennsylvania, U.S.
- Resting place: St. Peter's Churchyard; Philadelphia, Pennsylvania
- Children: Richard Peters Jr.
- Relatives: Richard Peters; Edward C. Peters
- Education: University of Pennsylvania read law

Richard Peters (June 22, 1744 – August 22, 1828) was a Pennsylvania lawyer, Continental Army soldier, Federalist politician, author and United States District Judge. Before his federal judicial service in the United States District Court for the District of Pennsylvania, Peters served as secretary of the Continental Board of War, delegate to the Congress of the Confederation and as member and speaker of the Pennsylvania House of Representatives and later the Pennsylvania State Senate. His son of the same name, Richard Peters, became reporter of the decisions of the United States Supreme Court.

== Early life and education ==
Born on June 22, 1744, at Belmont Mansion (then in the outskirts but now in Philadelphia, Province of Pennsylvania, British America). His father William Peters, had emigrated from Liverpool, England with his brother Rev. Richard Peters. His uncle had become involved in a family scandal, which caused their emigration. Both brothers had been trained as attorneys in England. The elder Richard became the secretary to William Penn as well as an assistant (later rector) at Christ Church, Philadelphia, held various positions with the Penn family, and beginning in 1749 became a member of the colony's Governor's Council (where he served until dying of natural causes early in the American Revolutionary War). William Peters was register of admiralty and judge of the courts of common pleas, quarter sessions and the orphan's court. From about 1762 until the war, all three Peters men lived at Belmont, and the first Judge Peters died in 1786. Meanwhile, young Peters (sometimes called Jr. to distinguish him from his uncle) graduated from the College of Philadelphia (now the University of Pennsylvania) in 1761, then read law in 1763.

== Career ==
Peters had a private legal practice in Philadelphia from 1763 to 1771. In 1771 he became registrar of the admiralty, and served in that post until 1776. Peters also farmed around and entertained visitors at his Belmont mansion described below. He helped found the Philadelphia agricultural society, became its first president (serving until his death) and published more than 100 papers in the society's "Memoirs".

Although many lawyers in town remained loyal to the Crown as relations with England soured, by 1775, Peters became a captain of the local militia, and continued in that position in the Continental Army, although his patriotic service would be mostly administrative. From June 13, 1776, until resigning on June 8, 1781, to run for the legislative post below, Peters served as secretary (and member of) the Continental Board of War. In that capacity, Peters discovered that Benedict Arnold had been misusing funds meant to purchase clothing and food for his troops, which caused a quarrel between them. In 1779, Peters gave to General George Washington draft designs for a national standard. In 1780, he was one of several prominent citizens who personally subscribed 5,000 pounds to the Pennsylvania bank to provision troops.

Peters was elected as a delegate to the Congress of the Confederation (Continental Congress) and served from 1782 to 1783. He secured an act of succession for ministers of the Protestant Episcopal Church in the United States during a trip to England in 1785. Pennsylvania voters elected and re-elected him as a member of the Pennsylvania House of Representatives from 1787 to 1790, and members elected him as their Speaker 1788–1790. Peters was then elected to the Pennsylvania State Senate, and he succeeded General Thomas Mifflin as its speaker from 1791 to 1792. When the federal government was formed, Peters declined an officer to become comptroller of the treasury. Peters also was the first president of the company which constructed the first permanent bridge over the Schuylkill River.

== Federal judicial service ==
At the recommendation of Col. Timothy Pickering, Jr., President George Washington on January 12, 1792, nominated Peters to a seat on the United States District Court for the District of Pennsylvania vacated by Judge William Lewis. The United States Senate confirmed the nomination on January 13, 1792, and Judge Peters received his commission the same day. When Justice Wilson died, Peters was mentioned as a possible successor, but declined because of the onerous circuit-riding duties, and Bushrod Washington, nephew and soon heir to General Washington, was nominated and confirmed for the position. Following the Judiciary Act of 1802, Washington was assigned to the Third Circuit, and sat on many occasions on a panel with Judge Peters. When Congress created separate judicial districts in Pennsylvania, Peters was reassigned by operation of law to the United States District Court for the Eastern District of Pennsylvania on April 20, 1818, the new seat authorized by 3 Stat. 462.

=== Notable cases ===
Peters was a party in the Supreme Court of the United States cases, United States v. Richard Peters, District Judge, and United States v. Peters.

The Ganges Incident: In 1800,The U.S. Navy sloop Ganges captured two illegal American slave vessels off Cuba and brought them to Philadelphia. 135 African men, women, and children were freed from the ships and cared for at the Lazaretto quarantine station. The owners of the ships took the government to court to return their property. Judge Richard Peters was assigned the case and ruled that the captives were people rather than property and granted them their freedom.

The freed individuals were given the surname "Ganges" and placed under the care of the Pennsylvania Abolition Society via indentures that notably guaranteed them an education and skills training."

=== Author ===
Peters became known for his expertise in admiralty law, and published "Admiralty Decisions of the District Court of the United States" (Philadelphia 1807).

== Death and legacy ==
Judge Peters' judicial service terminated on August 22, 1828, when he died at Belmont Mansion. He was interred in St. Peter's Churchyard in Philadelphia.

=== Belmont Mansion ===
Peter's home, known as "Belmont Mansion", still stands and is open as a museum. It is located at 2000 Belmont Mansion Drive in Philadelphia's Fairmount Park, which was established around it for the 1876 Centennial Exhibition.

== Famous descendants ==
Coat of Arms of Richard Peters

Peters' son, Richard Peters Jr. also became a lawyer as helped found the Philadelphia Savings Fund Society. However, he is best known for his publications, after he moved to the new federal city, and succeeded Henry Wheator as reporter of the United States Supreme Court, at first working closely with Bushrod Washington, whom he eulogized in 1830

Peters' grandson Richard Peters migrated to the South, where he became a founder of Atlanta, Georgia. That Richard's son, Edward C. Peters, bought and then sold off for development the land that is now the southern half of Midtown Atlanta.

== See also ==
- List of United States federal judges by longevity of service

== Sources ==
- United States Congress. "Richard Peters (id: P000255)". Biographical Directory of the United States Congress.
- Richard Peters at the Biographical Directory of Federal Judges, a publication of the Federal Judicial Center.
- Biographical sketch and portrait at the University of Pennsylvania
- Belmont: The Residence of Judge Peters, The Historical Society of Pennsylvania

Legal offices
Preceded by William Lewis	Judge of the United States District Court for the District of Pennsylvania; 1792–1818	Succeeded by Seat abolished
Preceded by Seat established by 3 Stat. 462	Judge of the United States District Court for the Eastern District of Pennsylvania; 1818–1828	Succeeded by Joseph Hopkinson
