= Strawberry Mansion High School =

Coordinates: 39.99073°N 75.18403°W

Location
- 3133 Ridge Ave; Philadelphia, Pennsylvania 19132; United States

Information
- Type: Public high school
- Established: 1965
- School district: The School District of Philadelphia
- Principal: Mr. Brian McCracken
- Staff: 28.12 (FTE)
- Grades: 9-12
- Enrollment: 309 (2024-25)
- Student to teacher ratio: 10.99
- Mascot: Strawberry Mansion Knights
- Website: Strawberry Mansion High School

Strawberry Mansion High School is a public high school in the Strawberry Mansion section of Philadelphia. It is part of the School District of Philadelphia. It was previously named Strawberry Mansion Junior / Senior High School, and Strawberry Mansion Middle/High School.

== History ==
Strawberry Mansion High School opened in 1965. In April 1992 the school had 1,600 students both middle and high school grades and 65% of them were from low income families. At that time the school had a high drop out rate. That year the school had a Business Academy, a "school within a school" teaching students job skills and preparing them for further education and immediate post-graduation employment.

In June 2011 Thomas FitzSimons High School and The Young Women's Leadership School at Rhodes High School closed, and the students were reassigned to Strawberry Mansion.

In May 2013 the school had 435 students. At that time 92 students were in the graduating class and 55 of them were accepted to community colleges and/or four year universities. Some of them were unable to afford the deposit fees. As of 2013 every student is required to go through a metal detector and the school had 94 security cameras. From 2008 to 2013, it was consistently on the Commonwealth of Pennsylvania's list of "persistently dangerous high schools".

It is located in a school building with a capacity of 1,762 students and 249,000 square feet (23,100 m^{2}) in space.

== Academics ==
In 1992, Kimberly McLarin of the Philadelphia Inquirer wrote that Strawberry Mansion was "not known for academic excellence". She would later write that the school's science club, named Science Force 2000, was "becoming a force at city and regional science fairs."

In 1992, a 16-year-old student submitted a science fair project that concluded that lead levels in water in residences of teachers living in Mount Airy and North Philadelphia, among other areas, were high, but at levels acceptable under federal law. Due to the project, some teachers residing in those areas began having their own water pipes tested.

== Football ==
In August 2015, the Strawberry Mansion varsity football team began to practice, after a hiatus of almost 50 years. In their first season back, they won one game.

== Controversy ==
Strawberry Mansion High School is considered to be one of the most dangerous public high schools in the country. The Pennsylvania commission on crime and delinquency consistently labeled it as one of the state's most dangerous schools until its removal from the list in 2013.

== Feeder patterns ==
Schools feeding into Strawberry Mansion include:

- Ethel Allen
- James G. Blaine
- William Dick
- Frederick Douglass
- Edward Gideon
- William D. Kelley
- Thomas M. Pierce
- E. Washington Rhodes
- Richard Wright

== Notable alumni ==
- Davis, Dwayne - Basketball player
- Farmer, Tevin - Boxer
- McCray, Darryl "Cornbread" - First graffiti artist
- Murray, Ronald "Flip" - Former NBA Player
- Newbill, Devonte Jerrell "D. J." - Basketball player
- Sullivan, Jazmine - Singer
- Williams, Robert Rihmeek - Rapper, professionally known as Meek Mill
