= Strawberry Mansion Bridge =

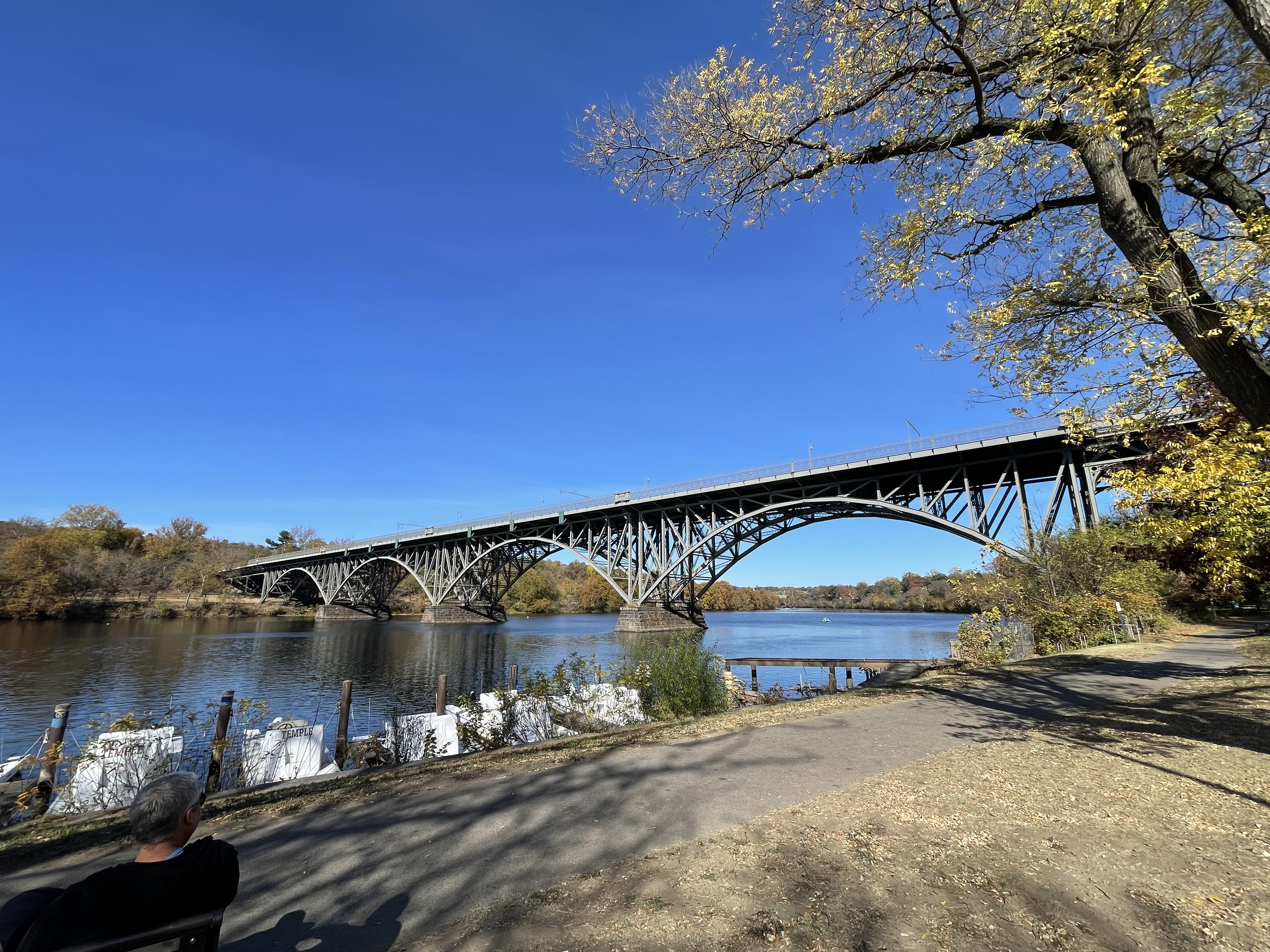
- View from the Temple University boathouse
- Coordinates: 39°59′42″N 75°11′38″W
- Carries: Strawberry Mansion Drive
- Crosses: Schuylkill River, Schuylkill River Trail, Kelly Drive, Martin Luther King Drive
- Locale: Fairmount Park, Philadelphia, Pennsylvania
- Official name: Strawberry Mansion Bridge
- Other name(s): Park Trolley Bridge

Characteristics
- Design: Steel arch
- Total length: 1,242.2 feet (378.6 m)
- Width: 80.0 feet (24.4 m): roadway, originally 40.0 feet (12.2 m)), currently 32.2 feet (9.8 m)); pedestrian walk 12.0 feet (3.7 m); former trolley right-of-way 28.0 feet (8.5 m)
- Longest span: 200.1 feet (61.0 m)

History
- Opened: April 20, 1897, reopened 1995
- Closed: 1991-1995 for renovations

Statistics
- Daily traffic: 14,500 (1996)
- Toll: none

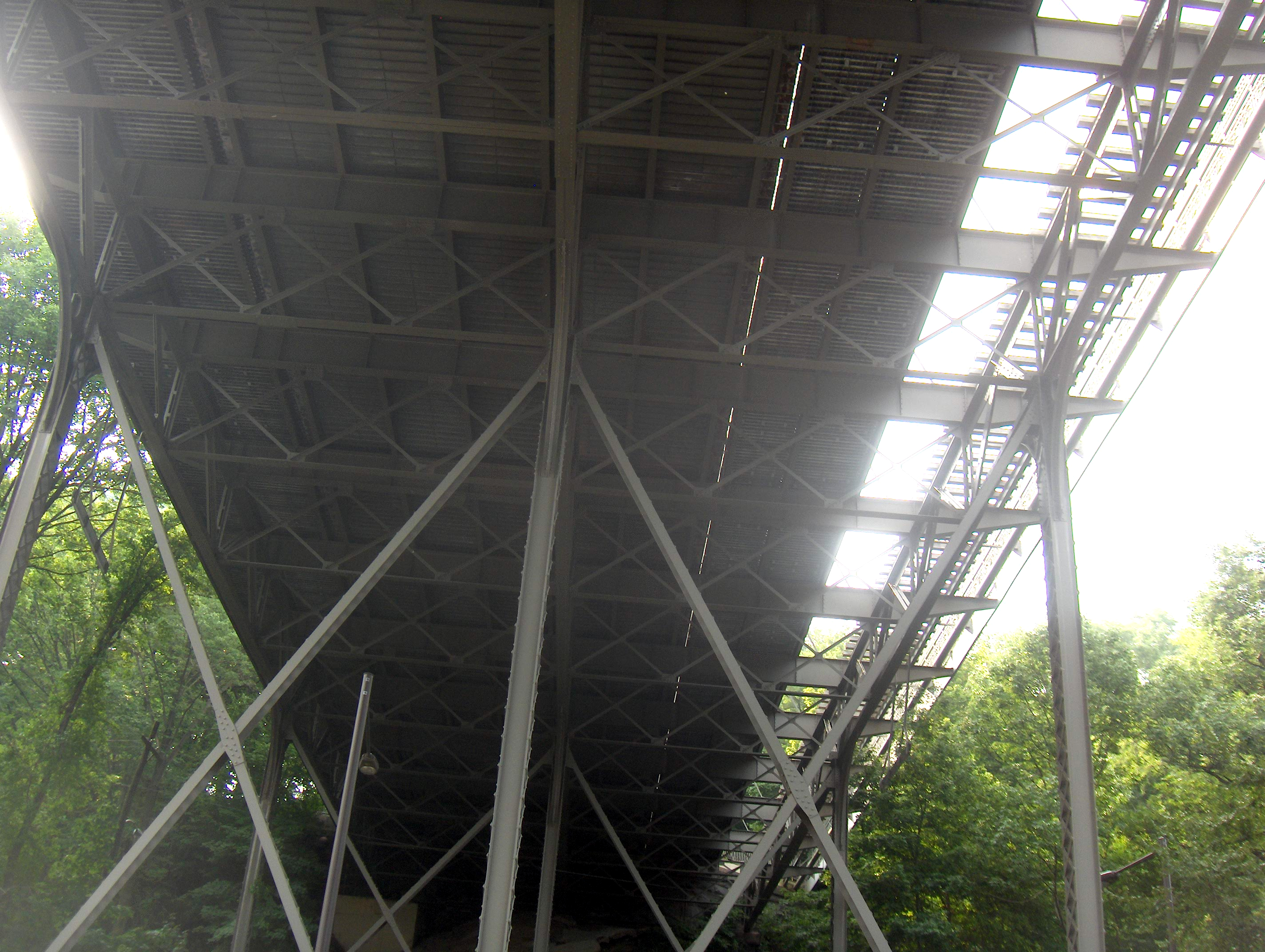
Roadway on left, pedestrian walk, former trolley tracks on right

The Strawberry Mansion Bridge is a steel arch truss bridge across the Schuylkill River in Fairmount Park in Philadelphia, Pennsylvania.

It was built in 1896–1897 by the Phoenix Iron Company in Phoenixville, Pennsylvania, under private ownership by the Fairmount Park Transportation Company, which operated trolleys over the bridge, with pedestrian and carriage lanes on the north side. Trolley service was discontinued in 1946.

The Philadelphia Historical Commission designated the bridge as a historic structure on September 7, 1978.

From 1991 to 1995, the bridge was closed to vehicular and pedestrian traffic while it was restored to its historical appearance. As of 2024, the bridge remains in use, carrying vehicular and pedestrian traffic.

The bridge was featured in season 9, episode 5 of the American sitcom It's Always Sunny in Philadelphia, titled "Mac Day."

== See also ==
- Historic Strawberry Mansion, from which the bridge takes its name
- List of bridges documented by the Historic American Engineering Record in Pennsylvania
- List of crossings of the Schuylkill River
