= George W. Nebinger School =

- U.S. National Register of Historic Places
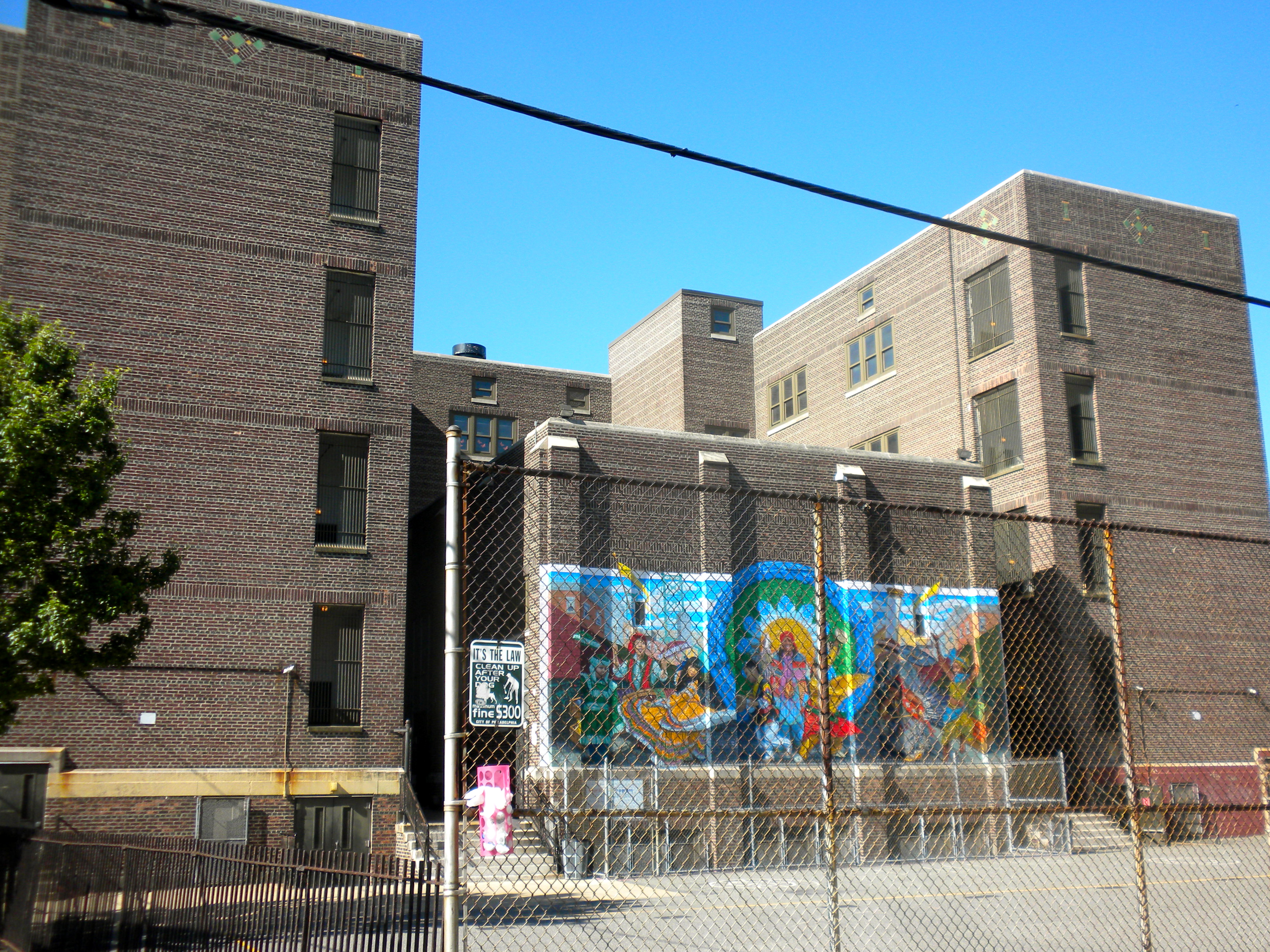
- George W. Nebinger School in May 2010

- Location within Philadelphia Location within Pennsylvania Location within the United States
- Location: 601 Carpenter St., Philadelphia, Pennsylvania, U.S.
- Coordinates: 39°56′12″N 75°09′14″W
- Area: 1.5 acres (0.61 ha)
- Built: 1924–1925
- Architect: Catharine, Irwin T.
- Architectural style: Art Deco, Utilitarian
- MPS: Philadelphia Public Schools TR
- NRHP reference No.: 88002303
- Added to NRHP: November 18, 1988

George W. Nebinger Elementary School is a K–8 school located in the Bella Vista neighborhood of Philadelphia, Pennsylvania. It is a part of the School District of Philadelphia.

Its historic school building was designed by Irwin T. Catharine and built in 1924–1925. It is a four-story, nine-bay, brick building on a raised basement in the Art Deco-style. The entrance portico features Doric order columns, and at the roofline is a brick parapet. It was added to the National Register of Historic Places in 1988.

== History ==
The School District of Philadelphia ended summer school, except for students who need to earn credits to receive high school diplomas, in 2012 due to budget cuts. As a result, Nebinger principal Ralph Burnley and Leslie Patterson-Tyler, the wife of the reverend of the Mother Bethel A.M.E. Church, established their own summer school program serving students from Nebinger and other area schools. It was financed by members of the church and the Queen Village Neighborhood Association.

== Demographics ==
In 2012 85% of Nebinger's student body was considered economically disadvantaged. That year Kristen A. Graham of the Philadelphia Inquirer wrote that compared to the William M. Meredith School in Queen Village and the George A. McCall School in Society Hill, Nebinger "struggles more".

== Feeder patterns ==
Neighborhoods assigned to Nebinger are also assigned to Furness High School.

== Gallery ==
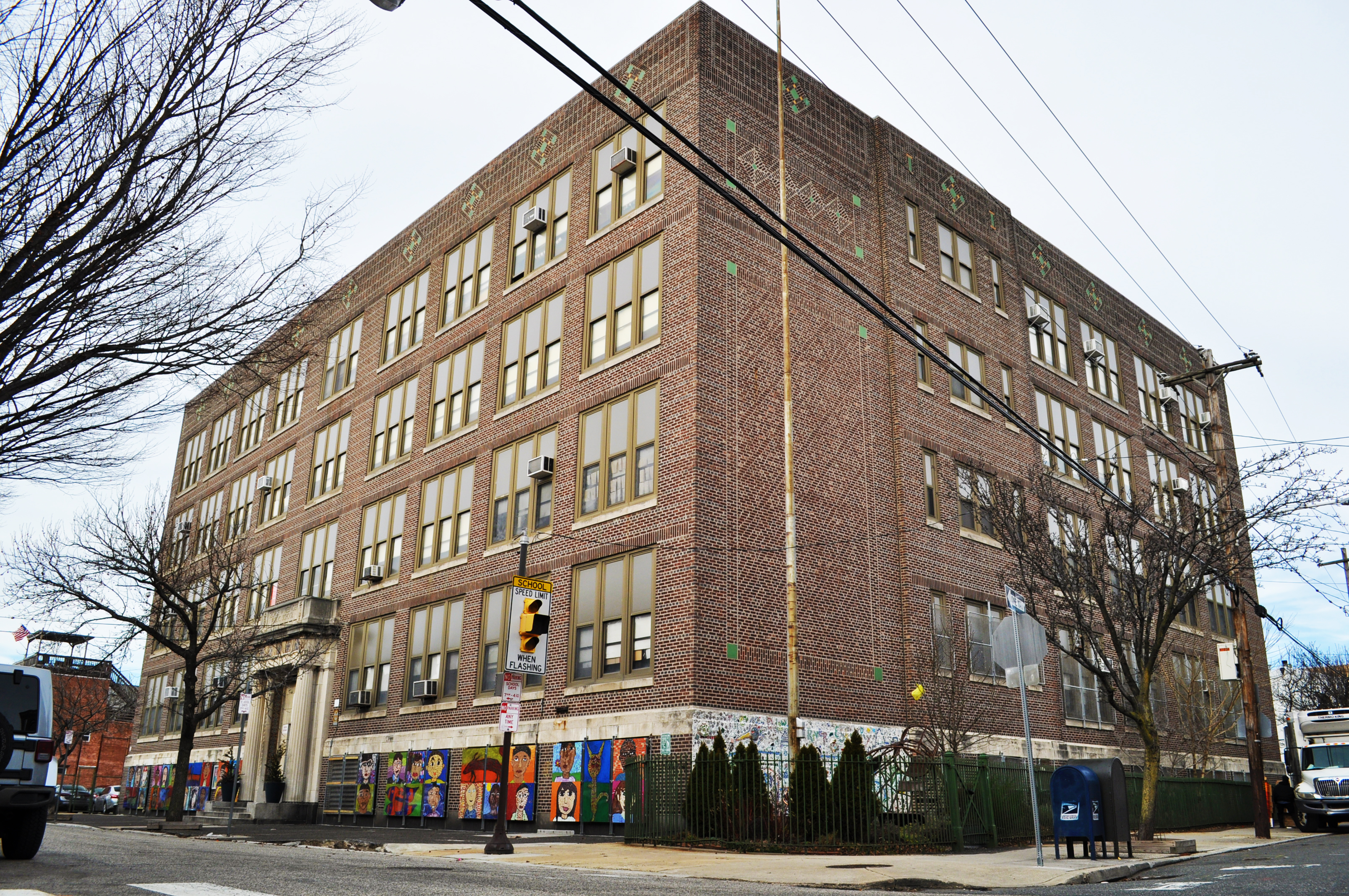

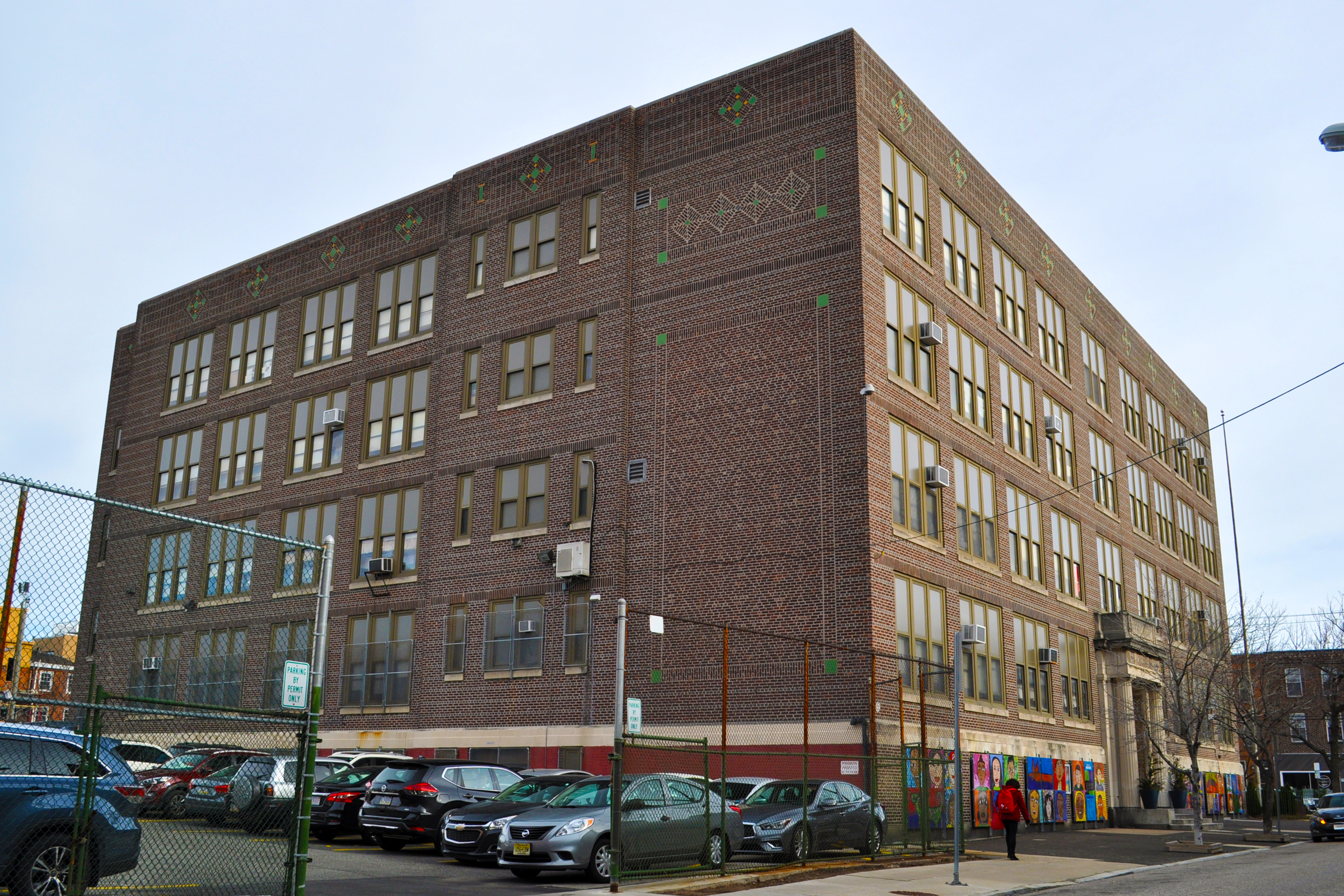

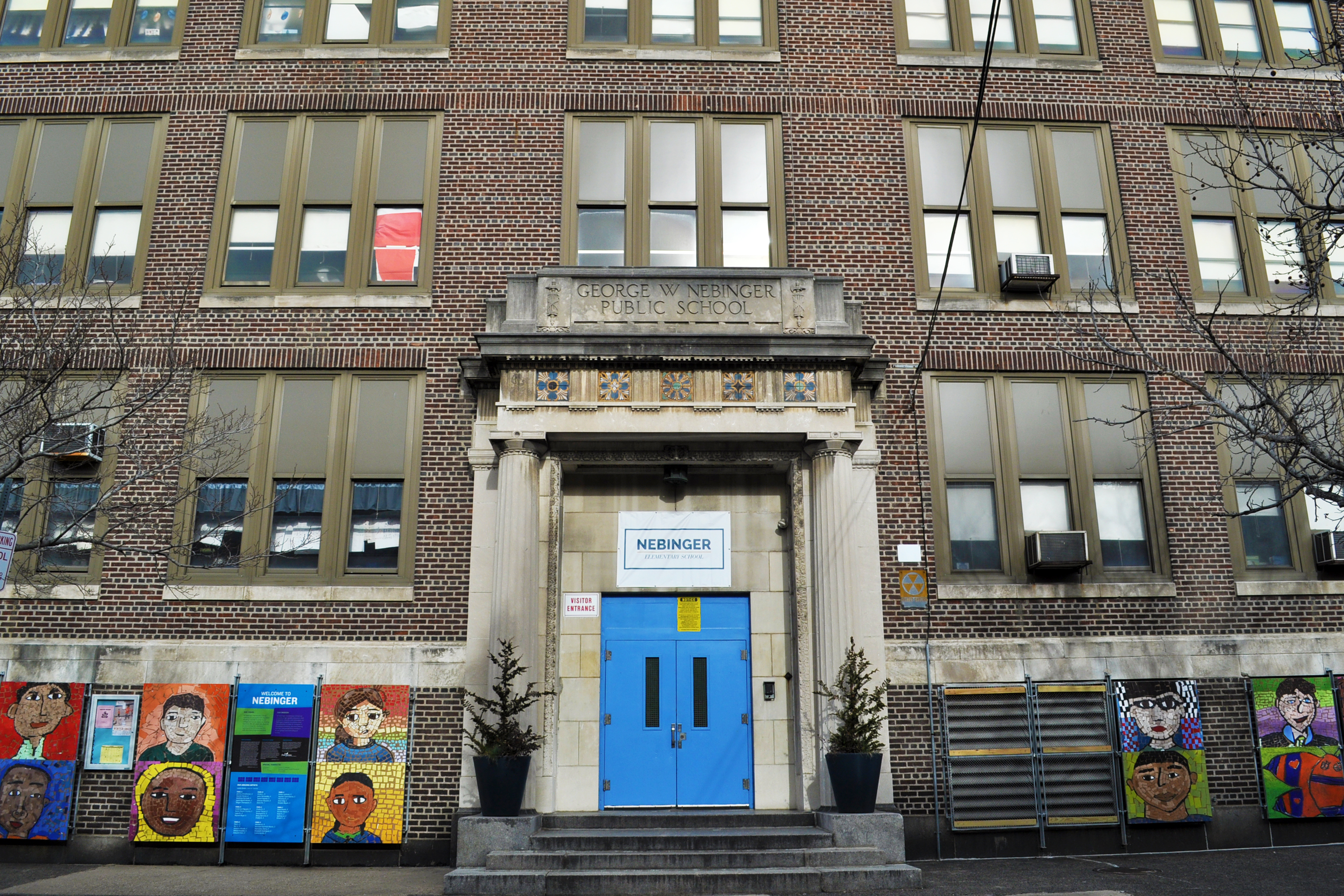

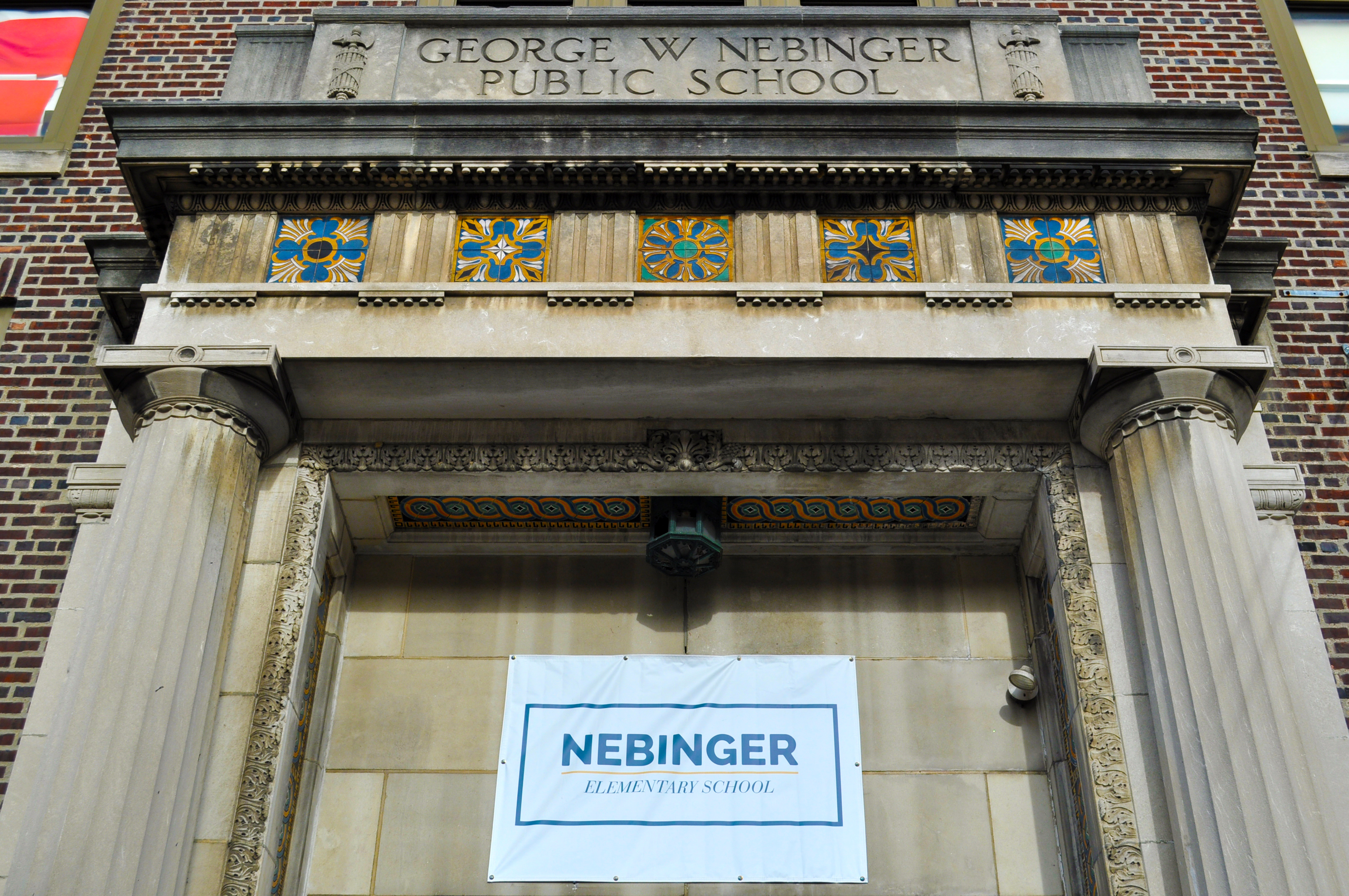
