= Capt. Thomas Moore House =

Historic house in Pennsylvania, United States

- U.S. National Register of Historic Places
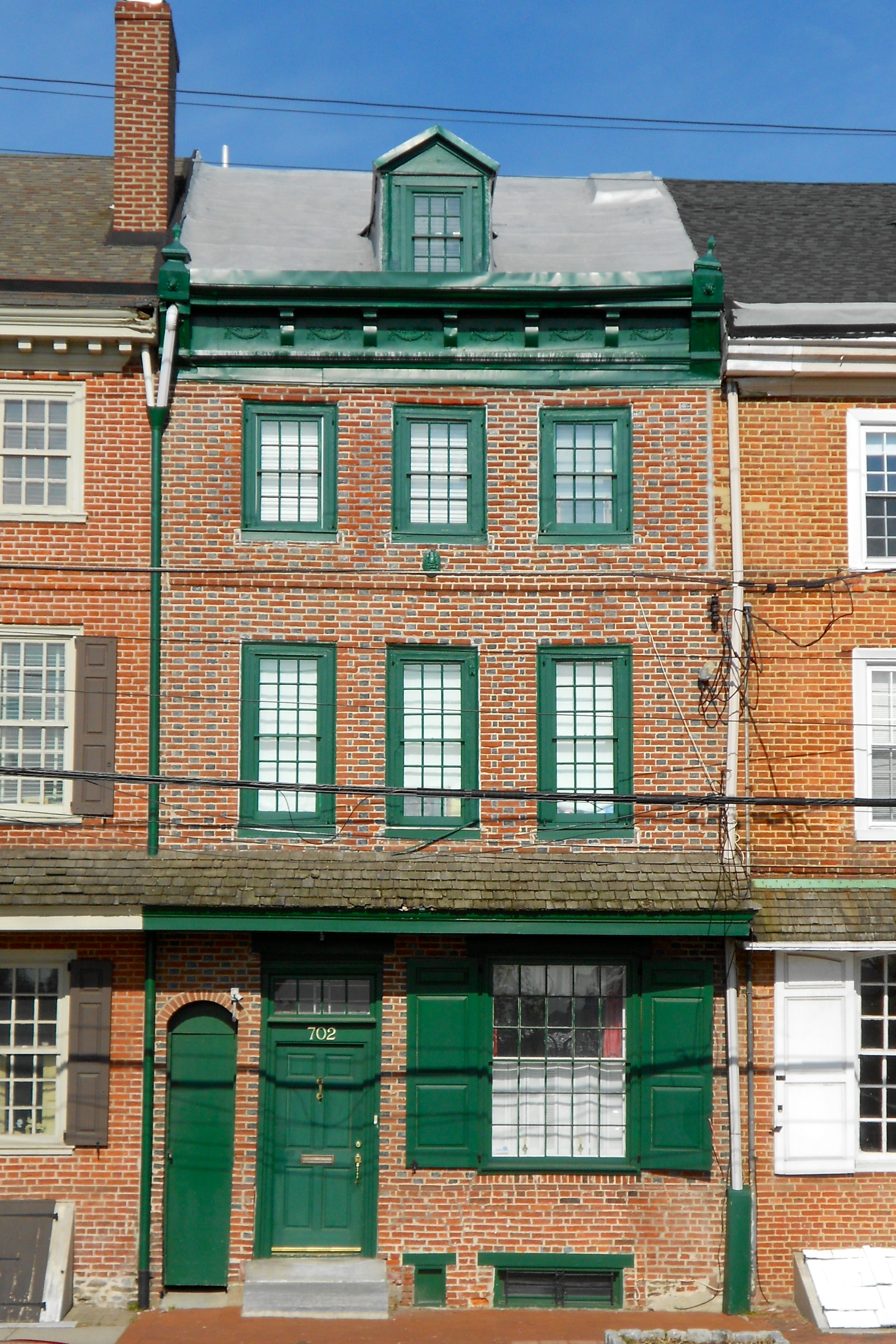
- Capt. Thomas Moore House, April 2015

- Location within Philadelphia Location within Pennsylvania Location within the United States
- Location: 702 S. Front St., Philadelphia, Pennsylvania, U.S.
- Coordinates: 39°56′23″N 75°8′42″W
- Area: less than one acre
- Built: 1767
- Built by: Irish, Nathaniel
- NRHP reference No.: 72001165
- Added to NRHP: March 16, 1972

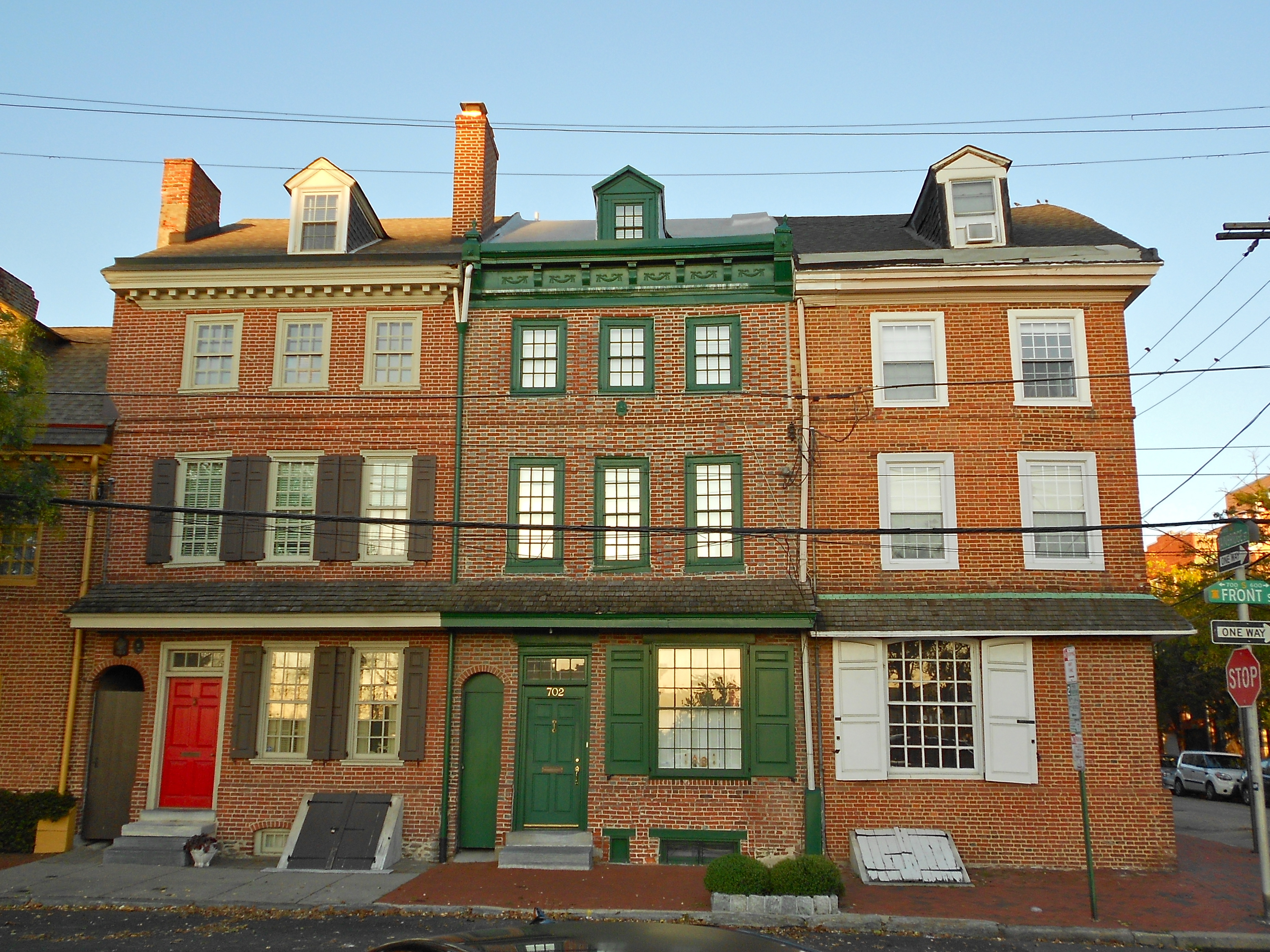
Captain Moore House (middle) in 2013

Capt. Thomas Moore House is a historic home located in the Queen Village neighborhood of Philadelphia, Pennsylvania. It is located in between the Nathaniel Irish House, to the south, and Widow Maloby's Tavern, to the north. It was built in 1767, and is a 3 1/2-story, three bay brick rowhouse. This house is believed to have been built by Nathaniel Irish.

It was added to the National Register of Historic Places in 1972. It is located in the South Front Street Historic District.
