= Queen Village, Philadelphia =

Queen Village
- Neighborhood
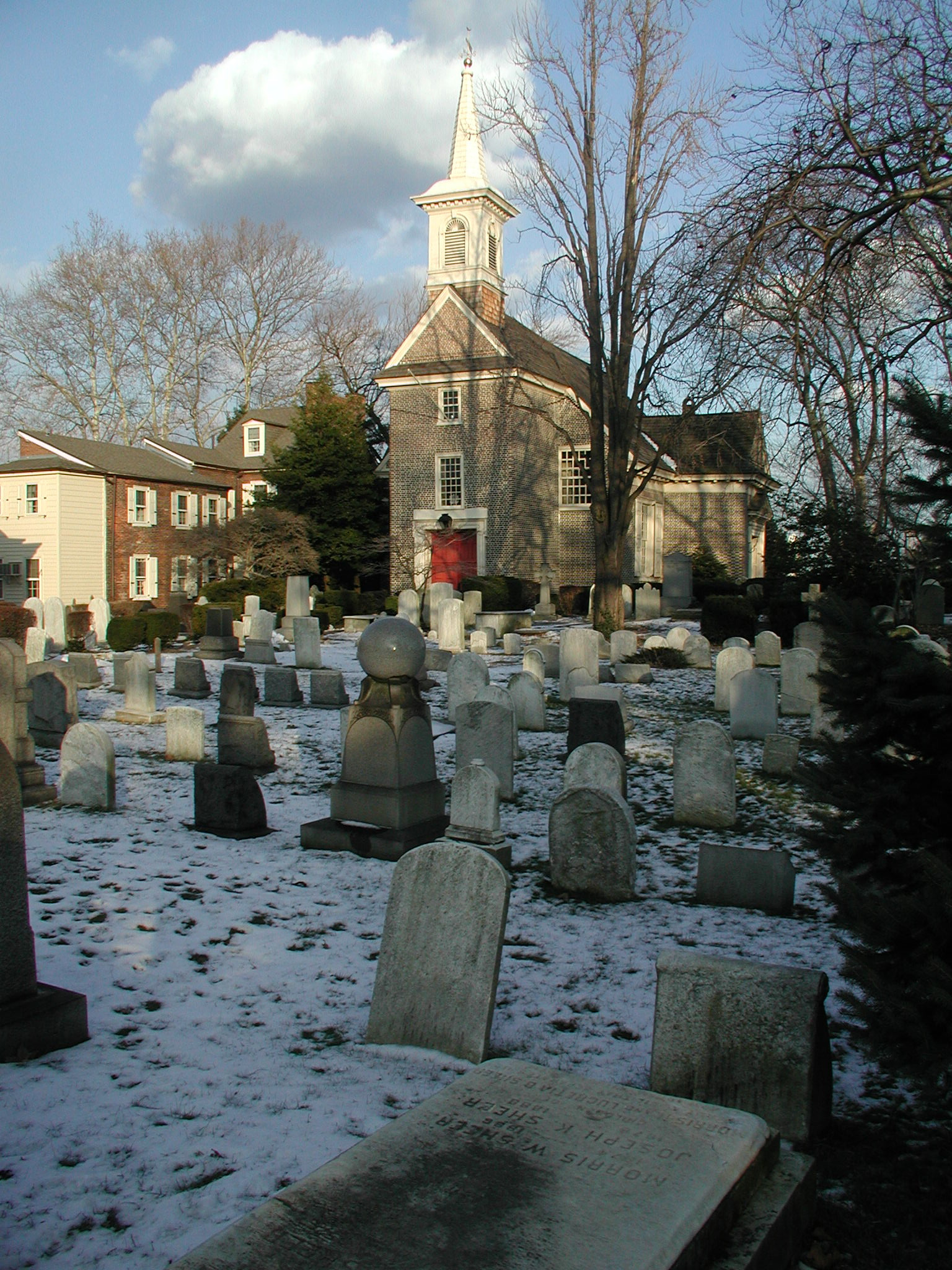
- Old Swedes' Church in Queen Village

- Location within Philadelphia
- Country: United States
- State: Pennsylvania
- County: Philadelphia
- City: Philadelphia
- Area codes: 215, 267, and 445

Queen Village is a residential neighborhood of Philadelphia, Pennsylvania, United States that lies along the eastern edge of the city in South Philadelphia. It shares boundaries with Society Hill to the north, Bella Vista to the west and Pennsport to the south. Street boundaries are the south side of Lombard Street to the north side of Washington Avenue, the Delaware River to 6th Street, encompassing two principal commercial corridors, South Street and Fabric Row on 4th Street.

Historically, the area is part of old Southwark, Philadelphia's first suburb, which was incorporated into the city in 1854 and remains the city's oldest residential neighborhood. It is known for its large Jewish and Irish immigrant population, though the South Philadelphia Irish-American community is increasingly centered in the nearby southern neighborhood of Pennsport. As with most of South Philadelphia, there is also an Italian-American community within the neighborhood.

== History ==
=== Founding ===
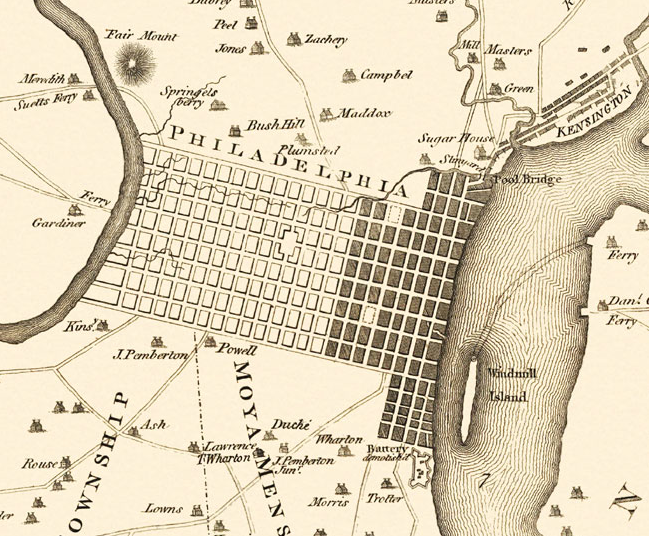
Philadelphia, c. 1777

The earliest European settlements in Queen Village were part of "New Sweden" in a region inhabited by indigenous Lenni Lenapi who themselves called the area "Wiccaco", or "Pleasant Place". New Sweden was contested by England, the Netherlands, and Sweden for several decades before large tracts of it came under British control as part of the 1681 land charter granted to William Penn, who renamed Philadelphia's first suburban settlement from "Wiccaco" to "Southwark," after a district in London. The neighborhood was later named Queen Village after Christina, Queen of Sweden.

The best-known extant structure from this period is Old Swedes' Church (Gloria Dei) at Christian Street and Columbus Boulevard. Originally built as a block-house against the Lenape, the church was completed in 1700 and is now the oldest surviving building within Philadelphia.

=== Growth ===
Despite Penn's planned orderly east-to-west filling of the city, new inhabitants tended to stay close to the Delaware River, preferring to subdivide Penn's original ample lots or move just south or north of the city rather than west beyond 4th Street. To meet spill-over demand, Queen Village builders constructed homes cheaply from wood, although this had been outlawed due to fires within the city limits by 1796. Only a few wood plank front homes survive in Queen Village along the blocks of 800 South Hancock Street, 200 Christian Street, and 100 League Street.

The Village diverged from the colonial city in cultural matters as well. Since Quakers forbid theater within the city limits, Queen Village, which offered a conveniently close strip for theaters to operate, was home to the first permanent playhouse in 1766 on South Street.

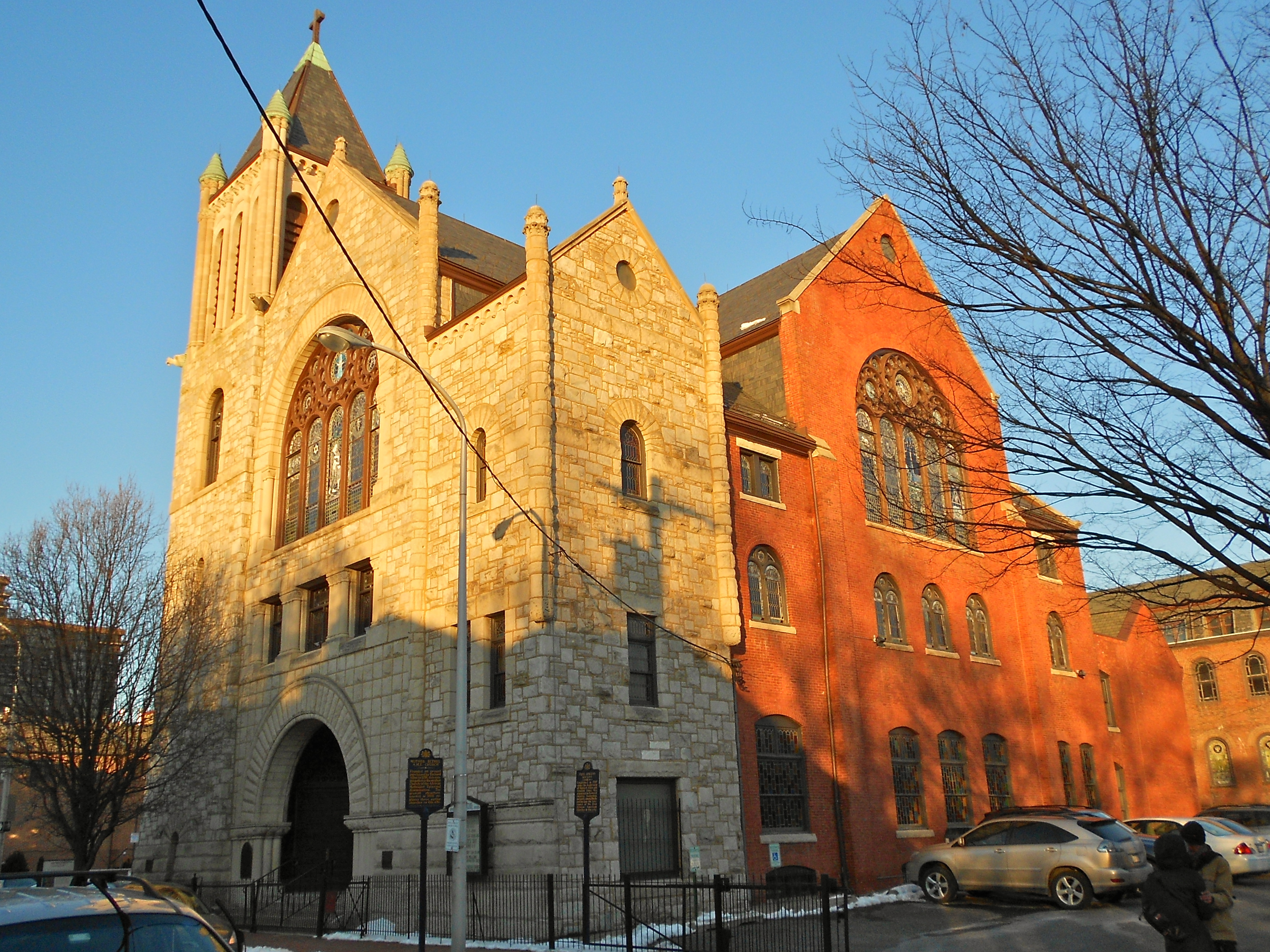
Mother Bethel AME Church in Philadelphia

Anchored by Mother Bethel African Methodist Episcopal Church at Sixth and Lombard, the "Cedar Street Corridor" (South and Lombard streets from Fifth to Seventh) was the center of Philadelphia's free Black community during the eighteenth and mid-nineteenth centuries. The presence of free Black churches and affordable housing encouraged African American settlement in Queen Village so that, by 1820, this area was home to nearly two-thirds of all of Philadelphia's Black families.

By 1830, Queen Village, as well as the southern parts of Southwark, contained a thriving community of 20,000 who made their living as weavers, tailors, ship builders, mariners or as machinists and blacksmiths in iron foundries.

Military industry was also present, including the Shot Tower and the US Naval Ship Yard, just south of Washington Avenue. Economic rivals clashed during the 1840s and 1850s through opposing labor unions, street gangs and Southwark fire companies, most of which headquartered along Catharine and Queen Streets. After the district was formally consolidated into the city of Philadelphia in 1856, a larger, centralized police force was deployed to contain mayhem fueled largely by economic competition.

By the 1890s, an Eastern European Jewish population settled along the South Street and 4th Street commercial corridors, the latter of which became Philadelphia's Fabric Row. A significant number of Poles settled along the waterfront as dockworkers; many Italians began arriving and settling in Queen Village and South Philadelphia after 1910. Severe overcrowding resulted in poor local housing conditions which were countered by housing reform efforts, including the still-active Octavia Hill Association.

By the first half of the twentieth century, Queen Village had grown into a racially and ethnically diverse neighborhood of merchants and laborers living in dense enclaves, not unlike New York's Lower East Side. The worst aspects of the neighborhood between the wars were portrayed in the hyperbolic pulp noir novels of David Goodis.

=== Decline ===
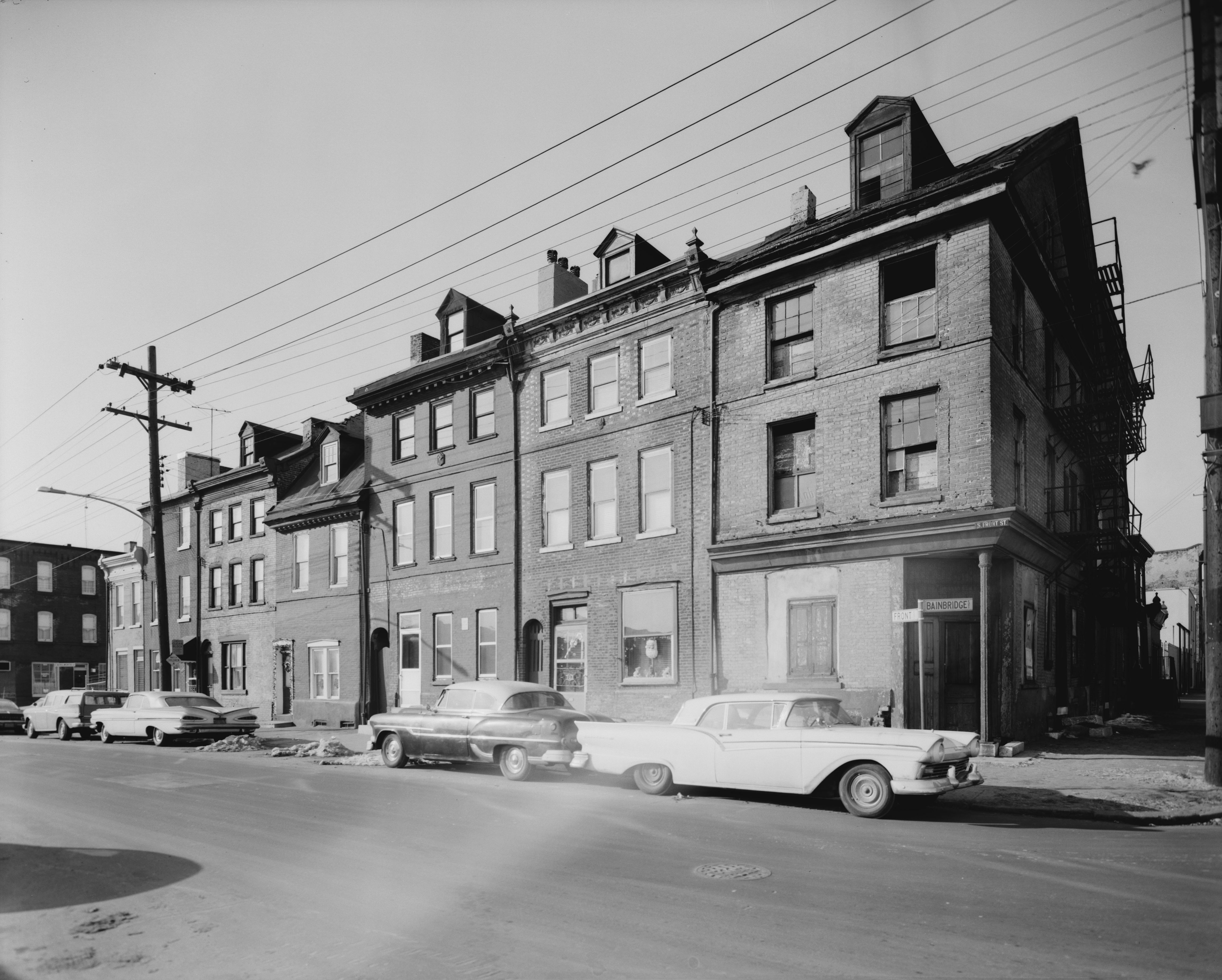
Front and Bainbridge Streets, c. 1961

After World War II, Queen Village's population began to decline for the first time in its three hundred year history as families left the city for the suburbs. Contributing to the decline, Edmund Bacon's central plan for Philadelphia cut off the neighborhood from its historical link to the river by driving I-95 through the neighborhood during the 1960s, demolishing some three hundred historic structures in the process. Bacon also planned for a Crosstown Expressway, an east-to-west highway on South Street that would have cut Queen Village off from Center City, much as the Vine Street expressway has siloed northern neighborhoods from the heart of the city. Although the Expressway was successfully fought by a civic backlash led by Denise Scott Brown, the impending threat of the highway caused South Street property values to plummet, driving away longtime businesses and leading to high vacancy and pockets of blight on South Street virtually from river to river.

Around the same time, civic planners also experimented with federal housing projects to concentrate the urban poor in high-rise towers. Entire blocks between Christian Street and Washington Avenue were cleared to create the Southwark public housing project, which became a haven for drugs and violence. Although the housing projects were ultimately torn down, the former location bore marks for many years. Queen Village's intersection of Fifth and Carpenter Streets was ranked ninth in a 2007 list of the city's top ten recreational drug corners, according to an article by Philadelphia Weekly reporter Steve Volk.

=== Renewal ===
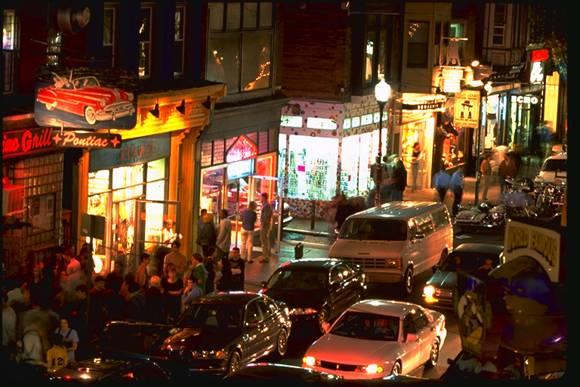
South Street at night

South Street's commercial revival began in the 1970's with a few anchor businesses like Eye's Gallery, JC Dobbs, and The Theater of the Living Arts, ramping up through a gritty punk phase into the restaurant/club/retail pastiche that exists today and extends fingers into Head House Square and 4th Street.

In 1972, the National Register of Historic Places designated Lombard to Catharine, 5th to Front Street with a bump-out from Front to Delaware between Catherine and Washington (where Old Swede's Church is located) as a historic district.

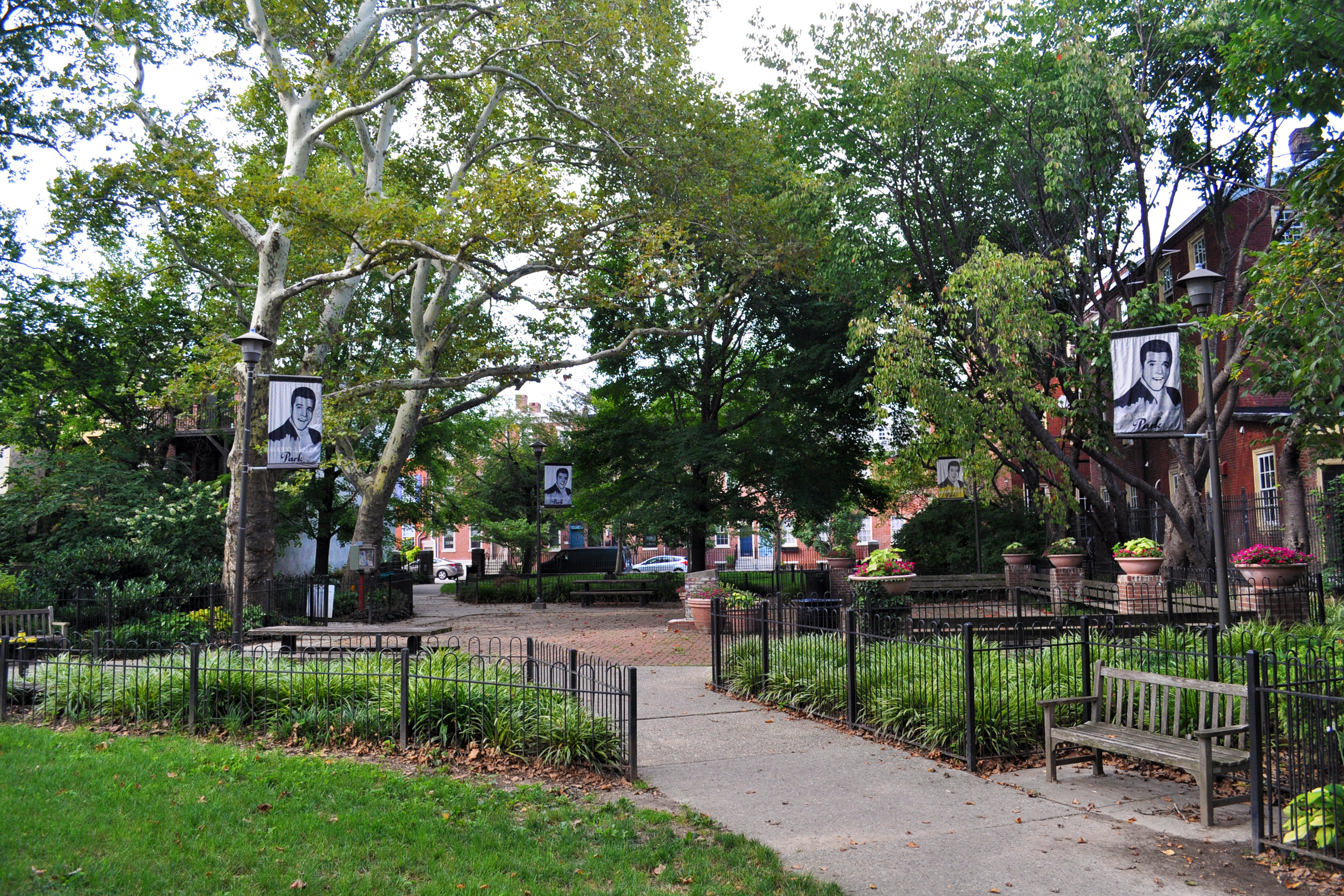
Mario Lanza Park, 235 Queen Street

Urban pioneers in the 1970s and 1980s joined gentrifiers in extensive redevelopment, rehabilitation, and new construction throughout Queen Village, which was renamed after the Queen of Sweden to acknowledge the neighborhood's earliest inhabitants. Today, the South Street-Head House District represents more than three hundred cafes, restaurants, entertainment venues, and shops, and Queen Village is home to roughly 7000 families whose median income and home values are among the highest in the city.

The district is served by the Queen Village Neighborhood Association.

== Historic structures ==
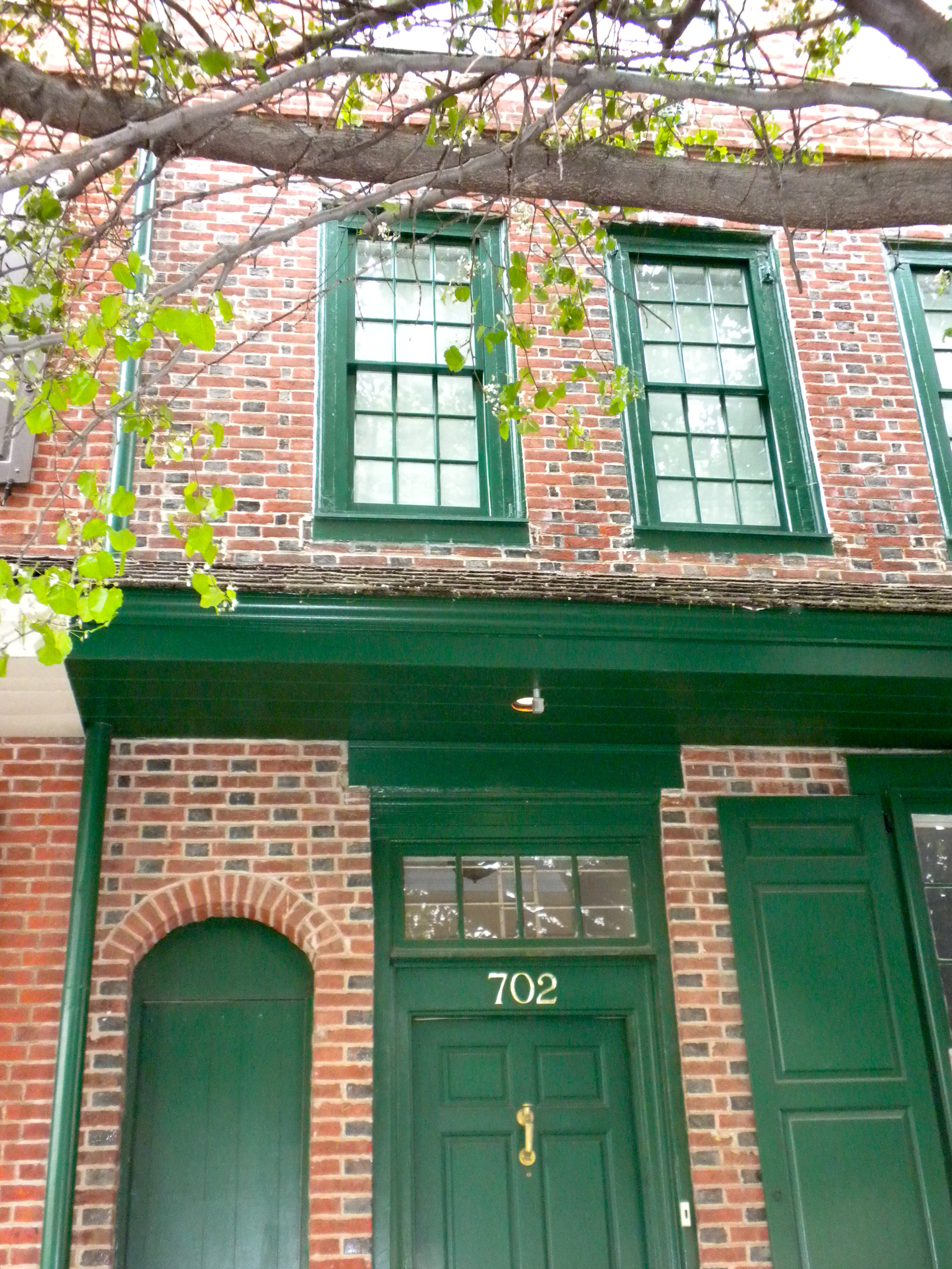
Capt. Thomas Moore House

Eight hundred extant Queen Village buildings are listed in the Philadelphia Historical Register.

Notable structures include:

- Several mid-18th-century homes still survive along Front Street between South and Christian Streets, including the Nathaniel Irish House at 704 South Front Street and the George Mifflin House on the 100 block of Pemberton Street
- Some research indicates that the Mason–Dixon line may start at Front and South Streets.
- The Sparks Shot Tower

The Nathaniel Irish House, Widow Maloby's Tavern, William M. Meredith School, Capt. Thomas Moore House, Robert Ralston School, and South Front Street Historic District are listed on the National Register of Historic Places. The Gloria Dei (Old Swedes') Church is a National Historic Landmark.

== Education ==
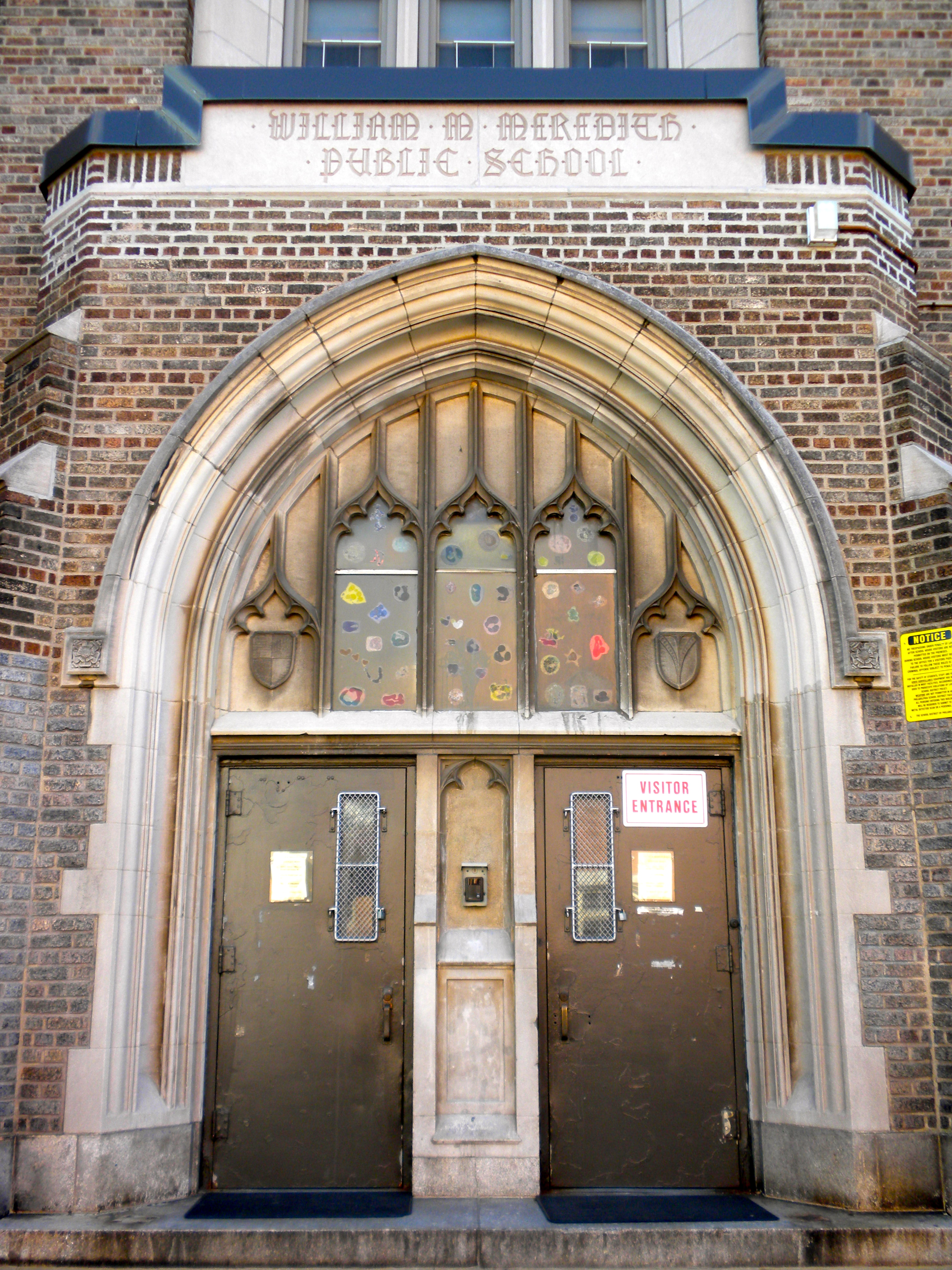
William M. Meredith School

The School District of Philadelphia serves the area. The William M. Meredith School in Queen Village and the George W. Nebinger School in Bella Vista serve separate portions of the community. Areas assigned to Meredith and Nebinger are assigned to Furness High School.

The Free Library of Philadelphia operates the Charles Santore Branch (formerly Southwark Branch), serving Queen Village. In addition, the Independence Branch in Society Hill serves Queen Village.

Other educational programs and resources:

- Settlement Music School, 416 Queen Street
- Fleisher Art Memorial, 719 Catharine Street
- Queen Village Art Center, 514 Bainbridge Street
- InMovement Studio, 500 Kenilworth St

== Transportation ==
Queen Village is served by the 40, 57 and 64 bus routes.
