= Front Street (Philadelphia) =

Road in Philadelphia, Pennsylvania

Coordinates: 39.914°N 75.149°W

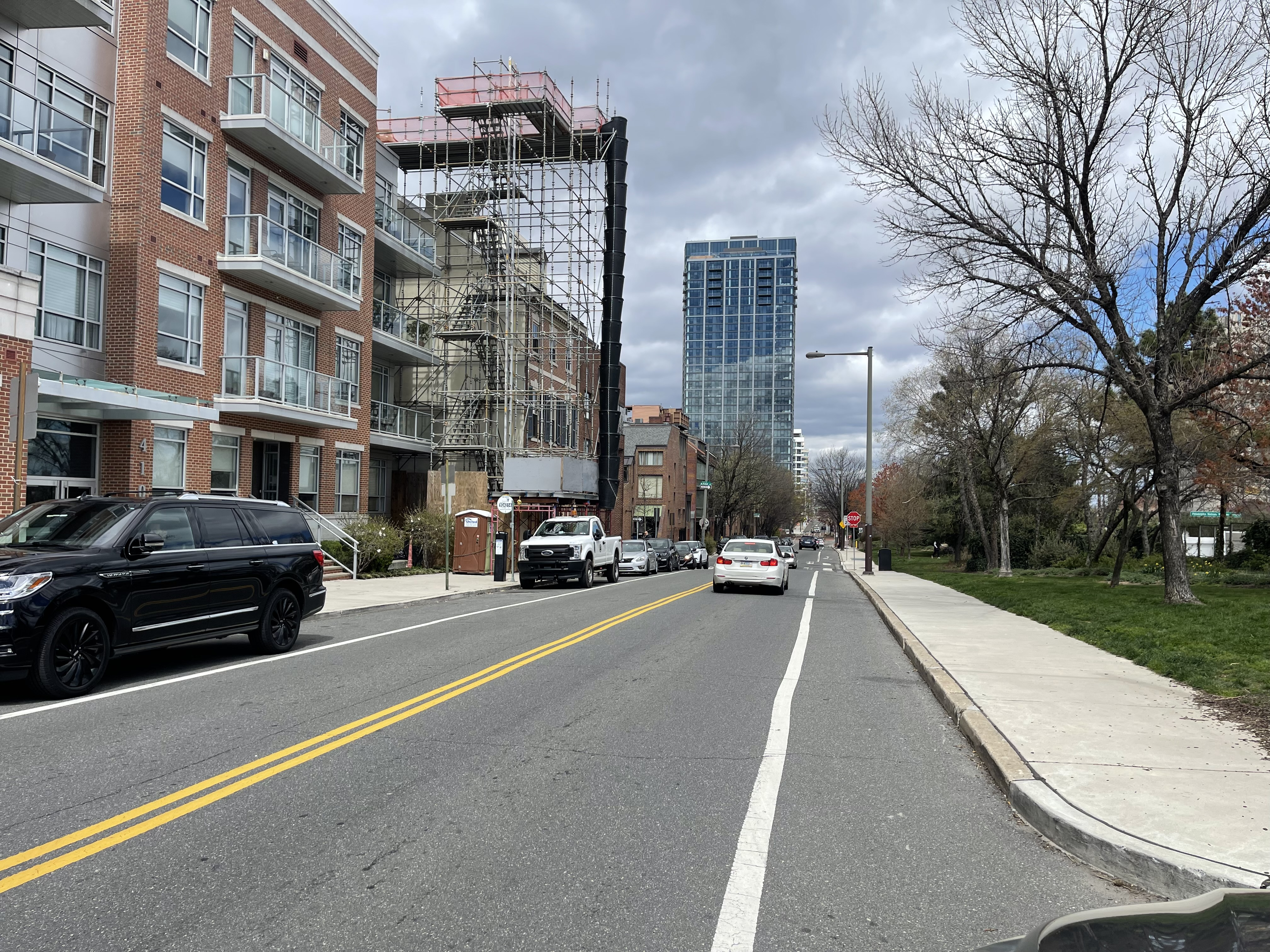
- Front Street in Society Hill
- Interactive map of Front Street
- Location: Philadelphia and Cheltenham Township, Pennsylvania
- South end: Pattison Avenue in South Philadelphia
- Major junctions: South Street in Headhouse District; Walnut Street in Penn's Landing; Chestnut Street in Penn's Landing; Market Street in Penn's Landing; Girard Avenue in Fishtown; US 1 / US 13 (Roosevelt Boulevard) in Feltonville; Cheltenham Avenue in East Oak Lane/Cheltenham Township
- North end: Ashbourne Road in Cheltenham Township

Front Street in Philadelphia, Pennsylvania is a north–south street running parallel to and near the Delaware River. In 1682, when the city was laid out by William Penn, it was the first street surveyed and built in during the colonial era Province of Pennsylvania. As part of the King's Highway, which extended from Boston to Charleston, South Carolina, and as the waterfront of Philadelphia's port, it was the most important street in the city from its founding into the 19th century.

Front Street is the origin street of Philadelphia's numbered streets. There is no First Street, Front Street exists in its place, and numbered streets begin at the next major block with 2nd Street, a tenth of a mile west.

At least three stations of SEPTA's Market–Frankford Line are built above Front Street. They include Girard station, Berks station, and York–Dauphin station. The Spring Garden Station is located on Front Street, and its platform lies in the median of Interstate 95 over Spring Garden Street, just west of Front Street.

== Historic sites ==
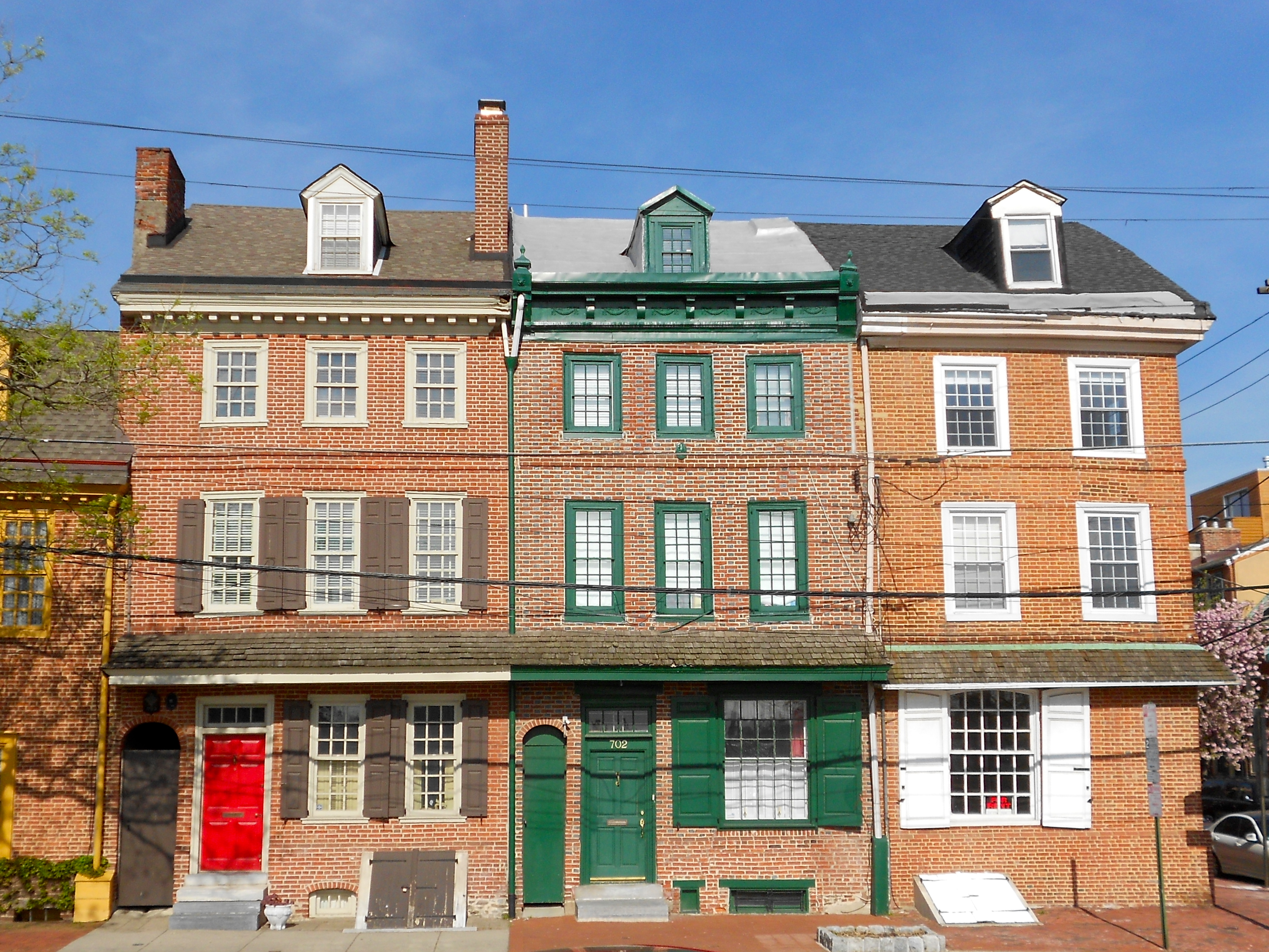
South Front Street Historic District

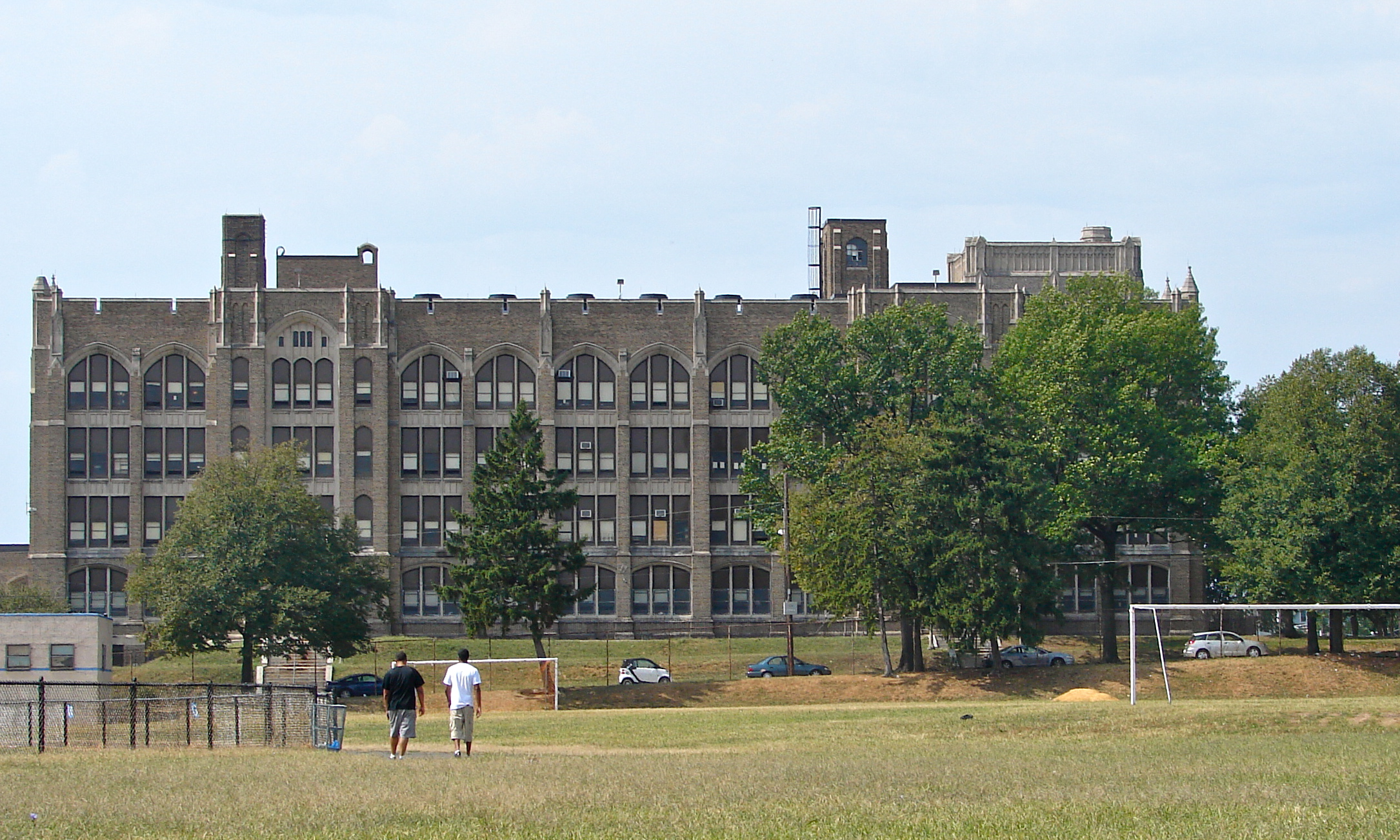
Olney High School

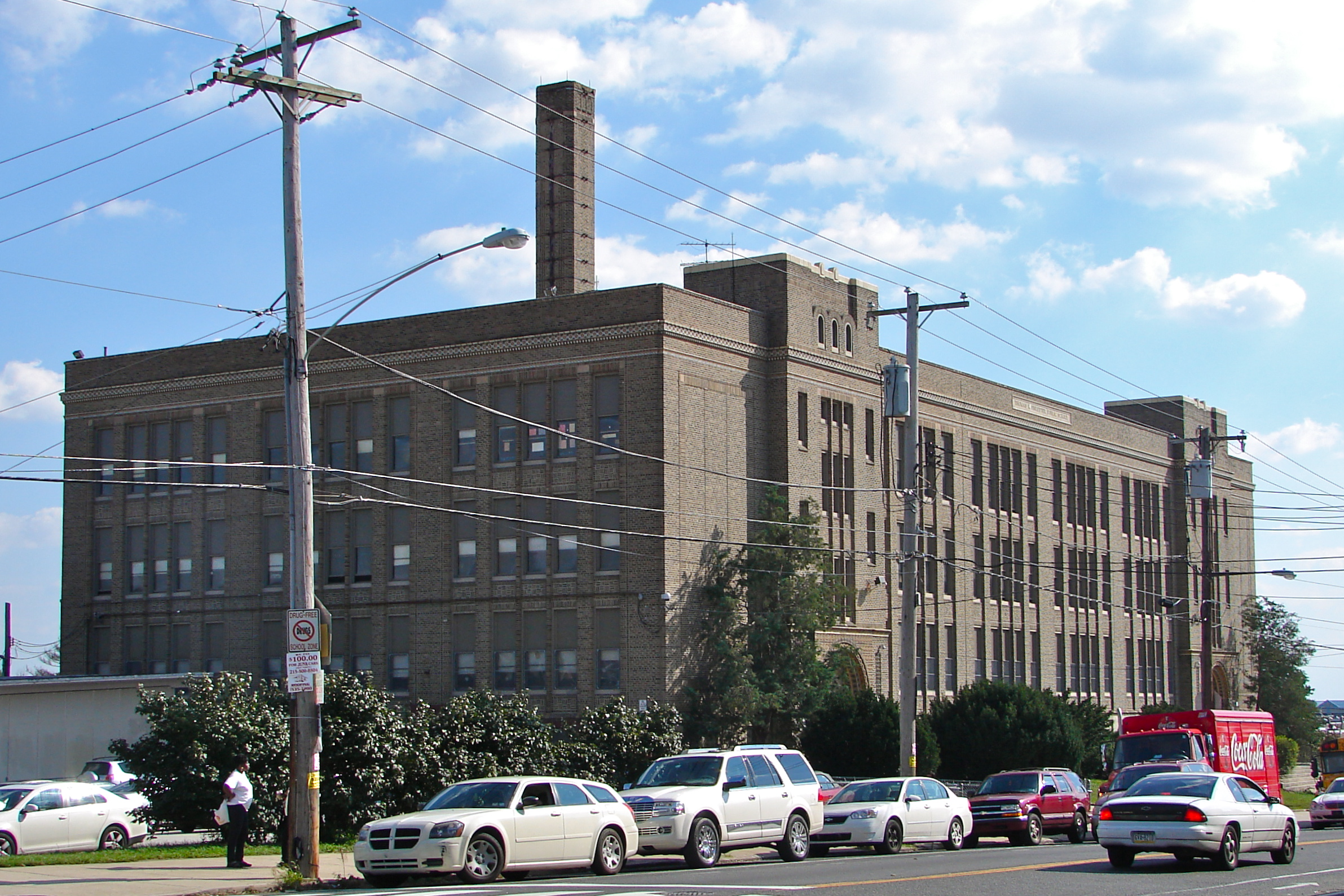
Thomas K. Finletter School

The South Front Street Historic District, which includes numbers 700–712 on the west side of South Front, is a historic district listed on the National Register of Historic Places. The district includes three buildings individually also listed on the NRHP: Widow Maloby's Tavern (700), Capt. Thomas Moore House (702), and the Nathaniel Irish House.

Four sites listed on the National Register adjoin North Front Street: Elfreth's Alley, the Quaker City Dye Works, and two schools, the Thomas K. Finletter School and Olney High School.
