= Sparks Shot Tower =

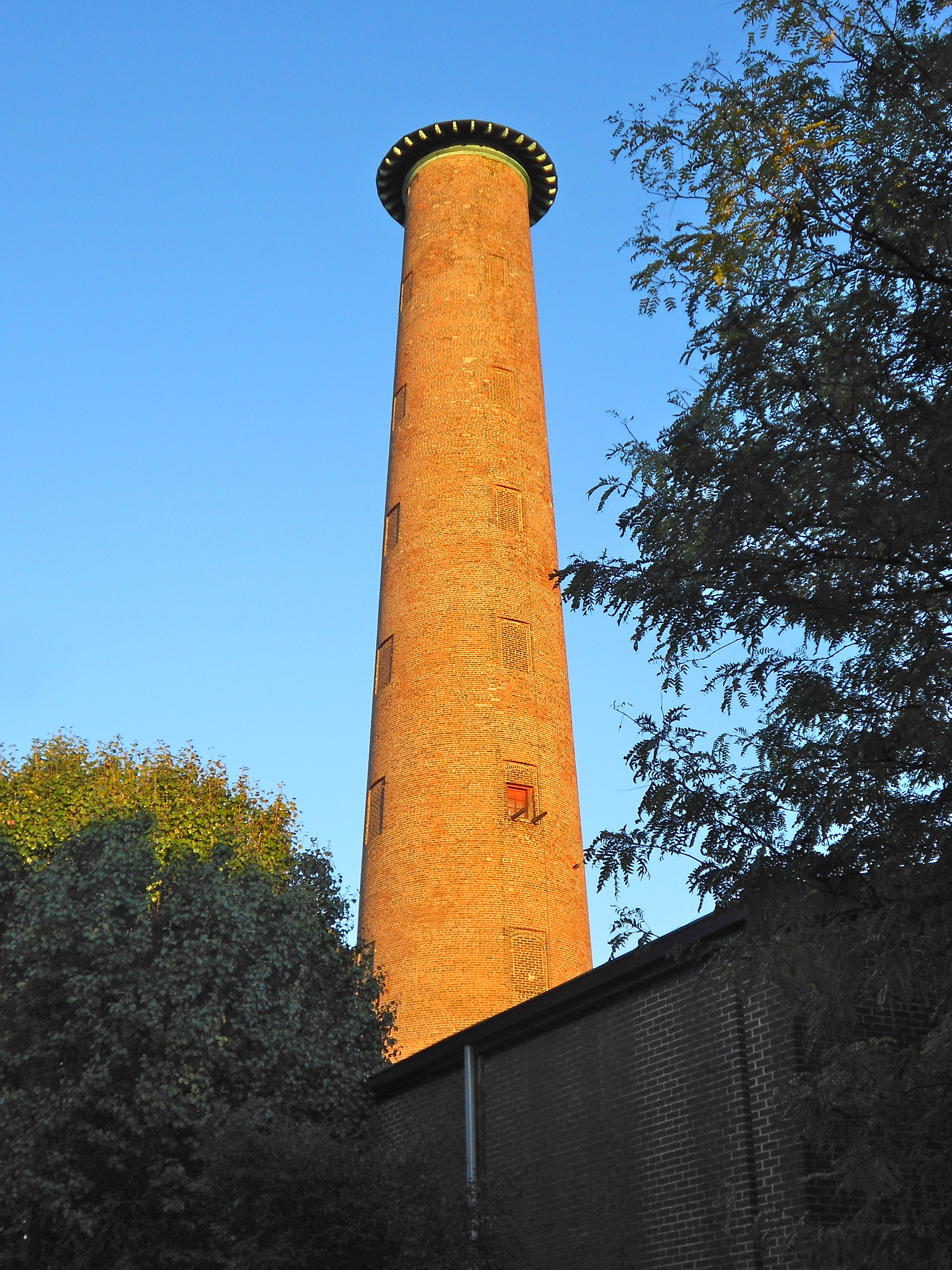
- Tower in 2013

- Location within Pennsylvania

General information
- Type: Shot tower
- Location: Carpenter Street & Front Street, Philadelphia, Pennsylvania, United States
- Coordinates: 39.9348°N 75.1463°W
- Construction started: July 4, 1808
- Owner: City of Philadelphia (Recreation Department)

Height
- Height: 142 feet (43 m)

Design and construction
- Architects: Thomas Sparks; John Bishop

Pennsylvania Historical Marker
- Designated: April 19, 1997

The Sparks Shot Tower is a historic shot tower located at 129-131 Carpenter Street in Philadelphia, Pennsylvania. Opened on July 4, 1808, it was one of the first shot towers in the United States, with the Jackson Ferry Shot Tower in Wythe County, Virginia possibly predating it by a year or so. It was built near the Delaware River waterfront at Front and Carpenter Streets, just west of Gloria Dei (Old Swedes') Church.

== History ==
Supplies of lead shot were imported from Europe before the Embargo Act of 1807. Plumbers Thomas Sparks, John Bishop, and James Clement built the tower to take advantage of the limited available supply. At the start of the War of 1812, the federal government became their major customer, buying war munitions, and Quaker John Bishop sold his part of the company to Thomas Sparks.

Before the use of shot towers, shot was made in wooden molds, which resulted in unevenly formed, low quality shot. Shot towers work on the principle that molten lead forms perfectly round balls when poured from a high place. Molten lead at the top of the tower was poured through a sieve or mesh, forming uniform spherical shot before falling into a large vat of water at the bottom of the tower.

The 142-foot (43 m) tall brick tower is 30 feet (9 m) in diameter at its base, tapering to 15 feet (5 m) at the top. Originally used to produce shot for hunters, the tower produced ammunition during the War of 1812 and the Civil War.

The tower operated for over a century, closing in 1913. Four generations of the Sparks family owned the tower until 1903, when they sold it to the United Lead Company of Pennsylvania. The City of Philadelphia bought the site in 1913. The tower is now managed by the Philadelphia Department of Parks and Recreation and is surrounded by a public recreation center and playground. It can be seen looking west from I-95.

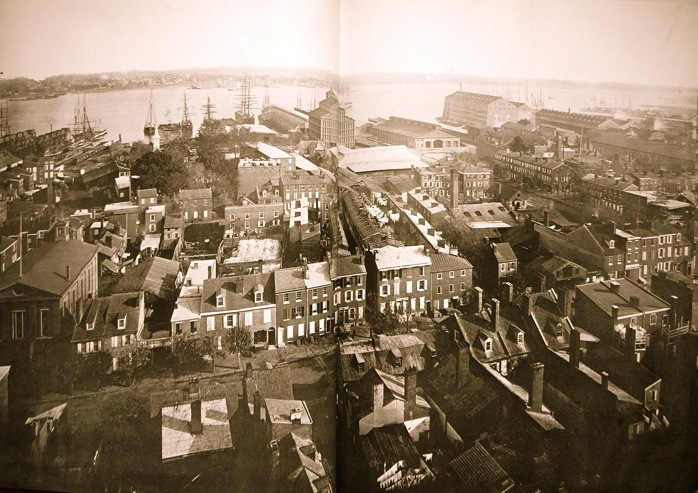
1870 photo from the top of the tower toward the Delaware River

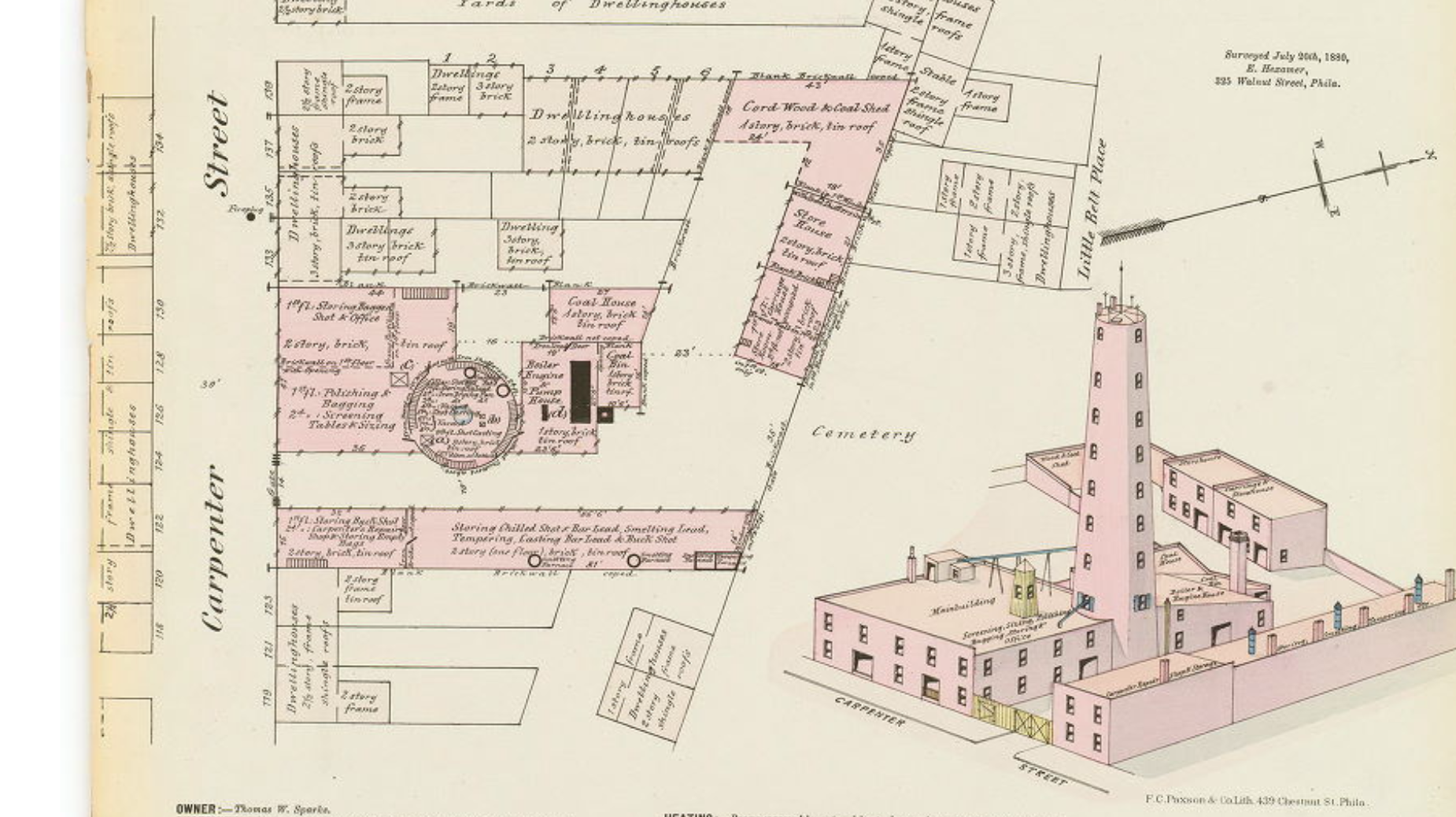
1880 Hexamer General Survey page on the tower

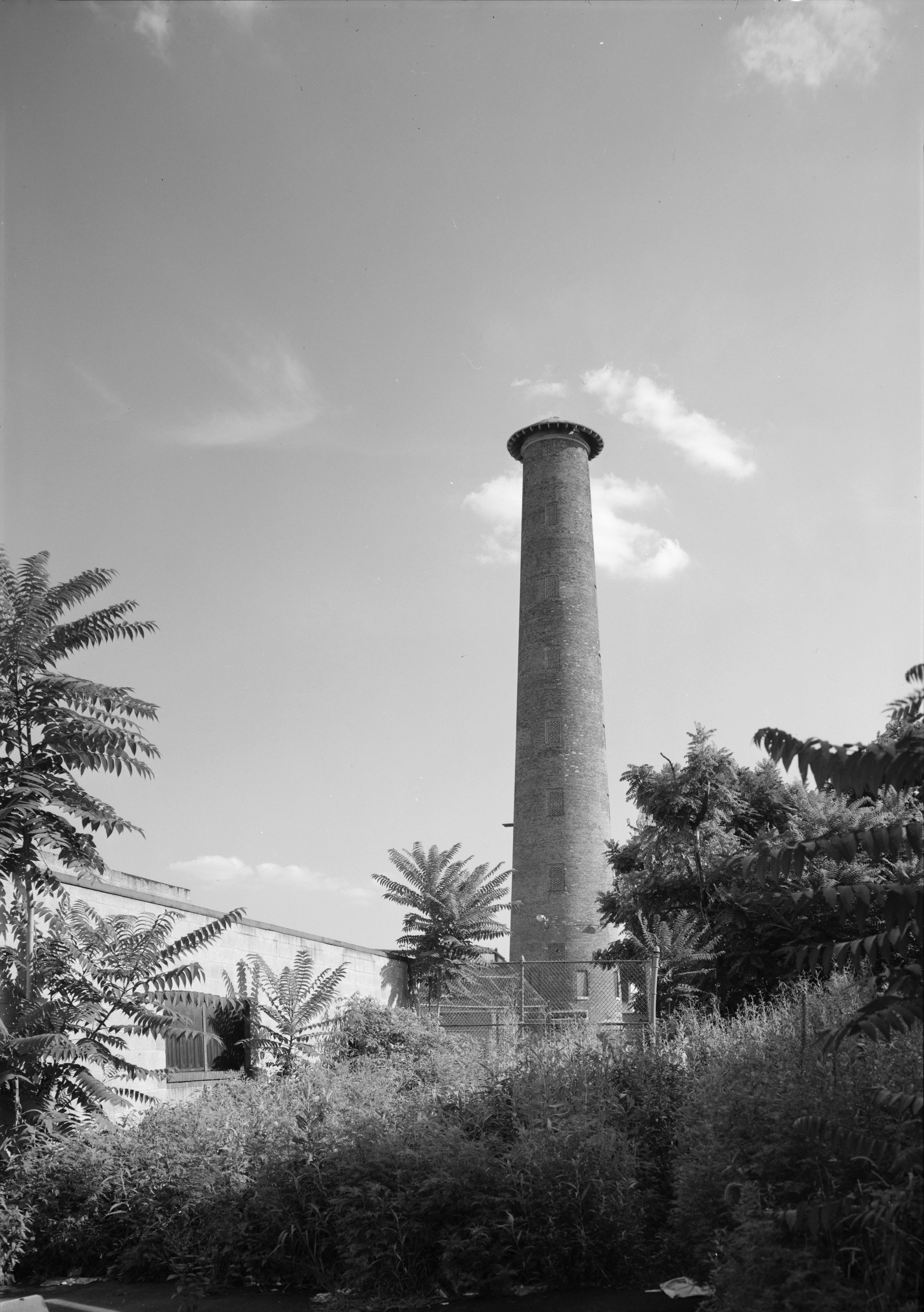
1973 Historic American Buildings Survey photo

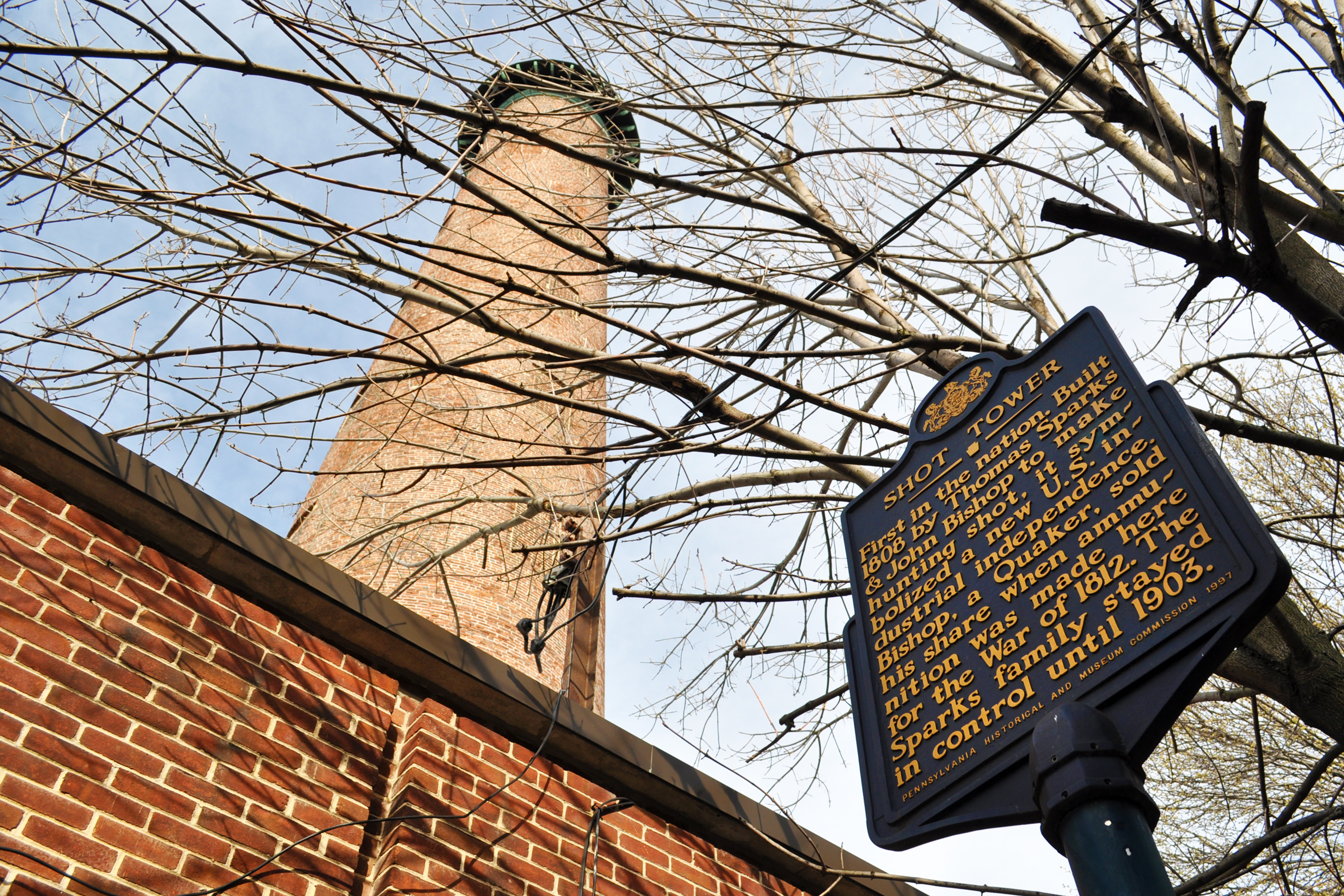
Historical Marker

== See also ==
- Lead shot
- Phoenix Shot Tower
- Shotgun shell
