= South Front Street Historic District =

Historic district in Pennsylvania, United States

- U.S. National Register of Historic Places
- U.S. Historic district
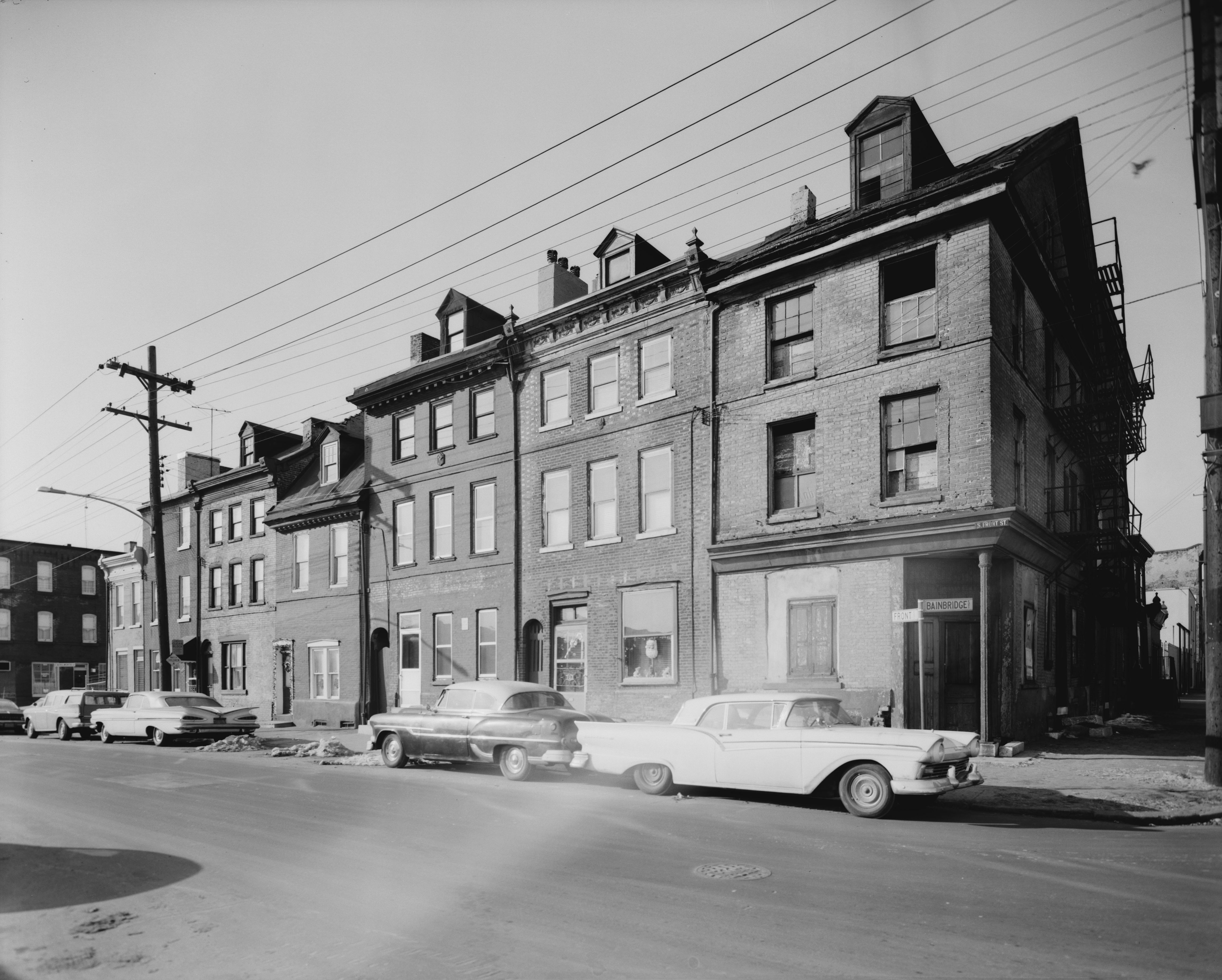
- 700 block of Front Street in 1961

- Location within Philadelphia Location within Pennsylvania Location within the United States
- Location: 700-712 S. Front St., W side Bainbridge St. to Kenilworth St., Philadelphia, Pennsylvania, U.S.
- Coordinates: 39°56′23″N 75°8′42″W
- Area: 9.9 acres (4.0 ha)
- Built: 1740
- Built by: Smith, Samuel; Irish, Nathaniel
- NRHP reference No.: 72001171
- Added to NRHP: April 25, 1972

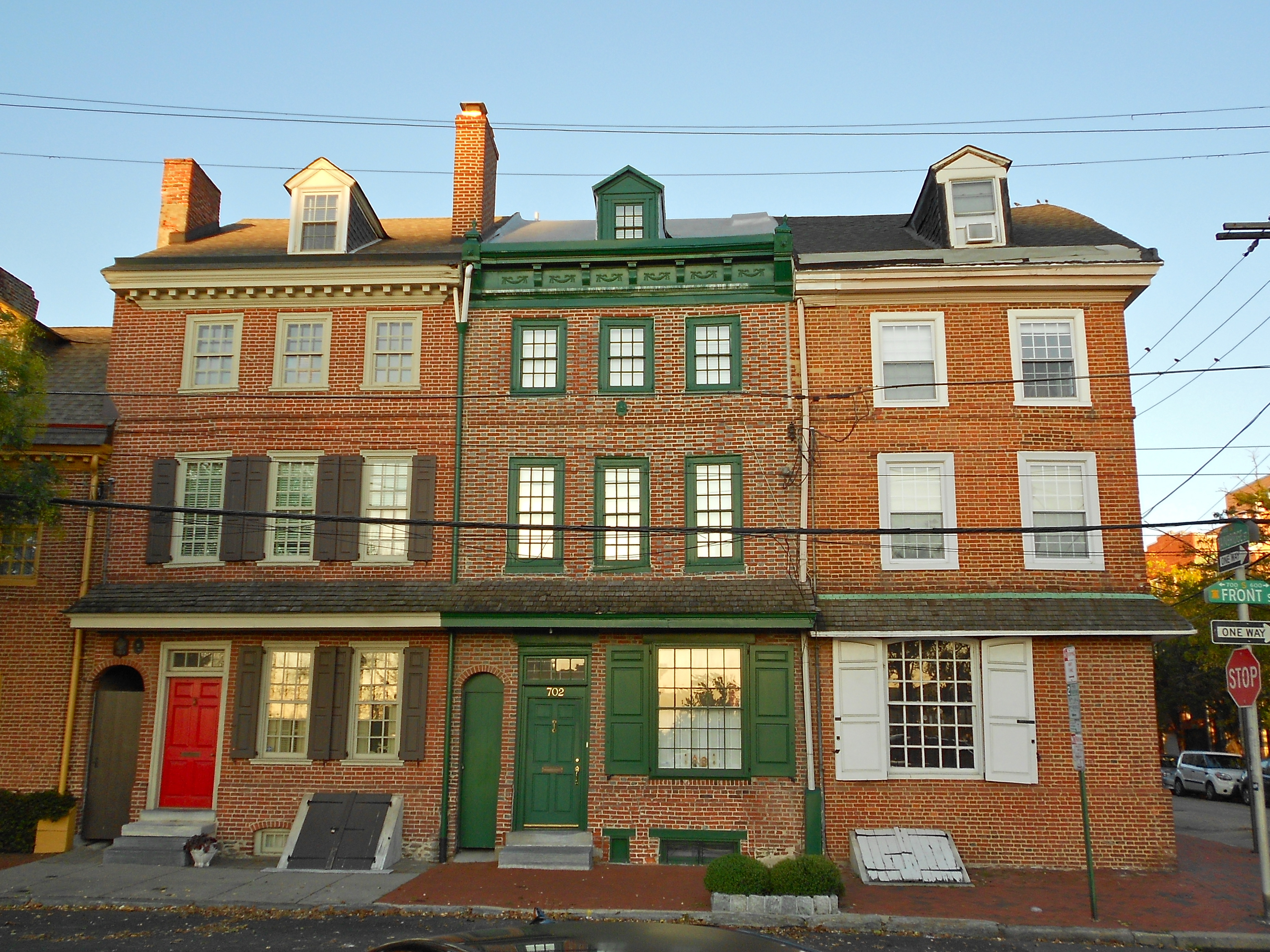
700-704 S. Front Street in 2013

South Front Street Historic District is a national historic district located in the Queen Village neighborhood of Philadelphia, Pennsylvania. It encompasses seven contributing buildings, including the Nathaniel Irish House, Widow Maloby's Tavern, and Capt. Thomas Moore House, which are individually listed on the NRHP.

It was added to the National Register of Historic Places in 1972.
