= William M. Meredith School =

- U.S. National Register of Historic Places
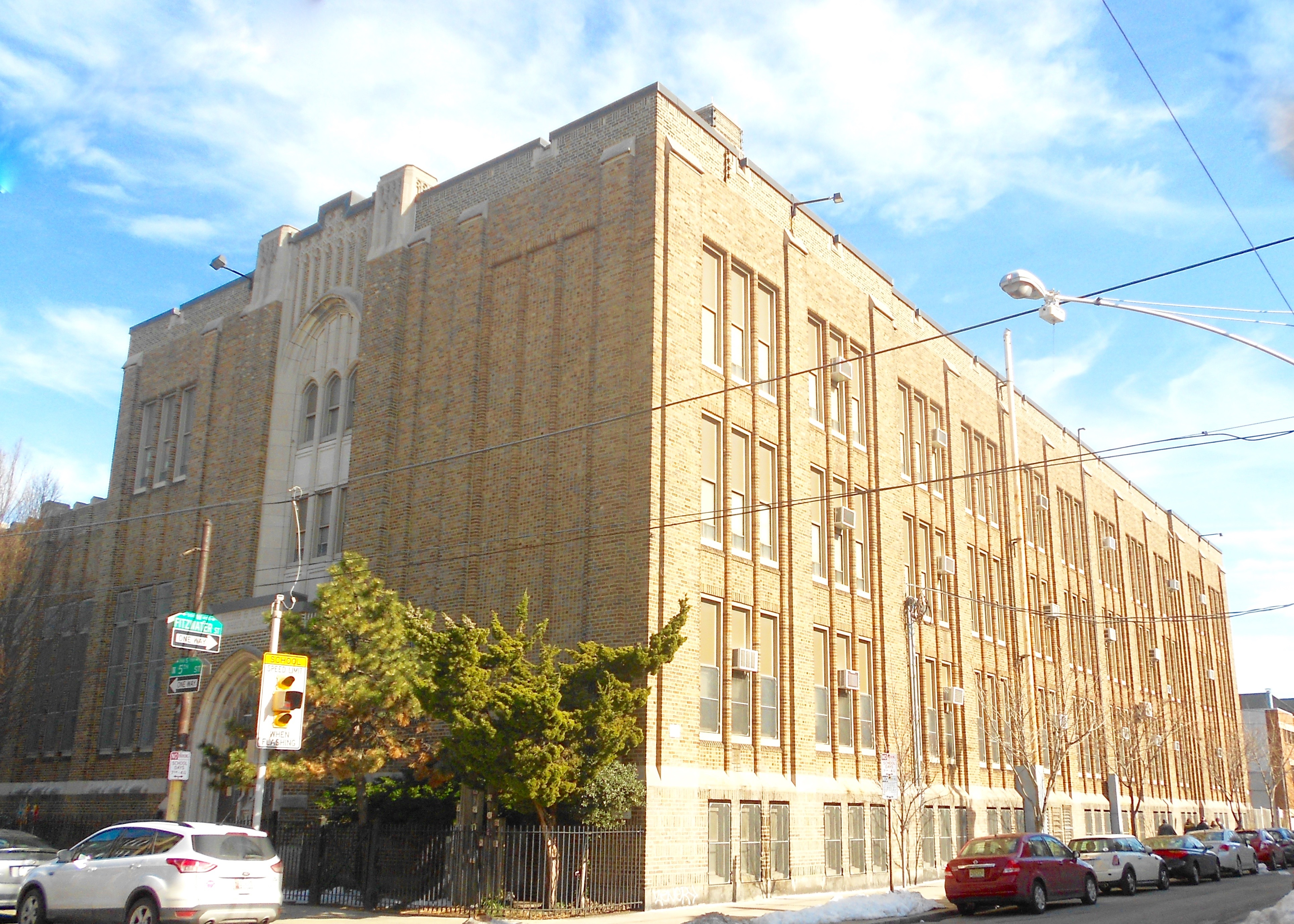
- The school's entrance in May 2010

- Location within Philadelphia Location within Pennsylvania Location within the United States
- Location: 725 S. 5th St., Philadelphia, Pennsylvania, U.S.
- Coordinates: 39.9396°N 75.1510°W
- Area: 1 acre (0.40 ha)
- Built: 1930–1931
- Architect: Irwin T. Catharine
- Architectural style: Art Deco
- MPS: Philadelphia Public Schools TR
- NRHP reference No.: 86003307
- Added to NRHP: December 4, 1986

William M. Meredith School is a public K-8 school located in the Queen Village neighborhood of Philadelphia, Pennsylvania. It is a part of the School District of Philadelphia.

== History ==
=== 19th century ===
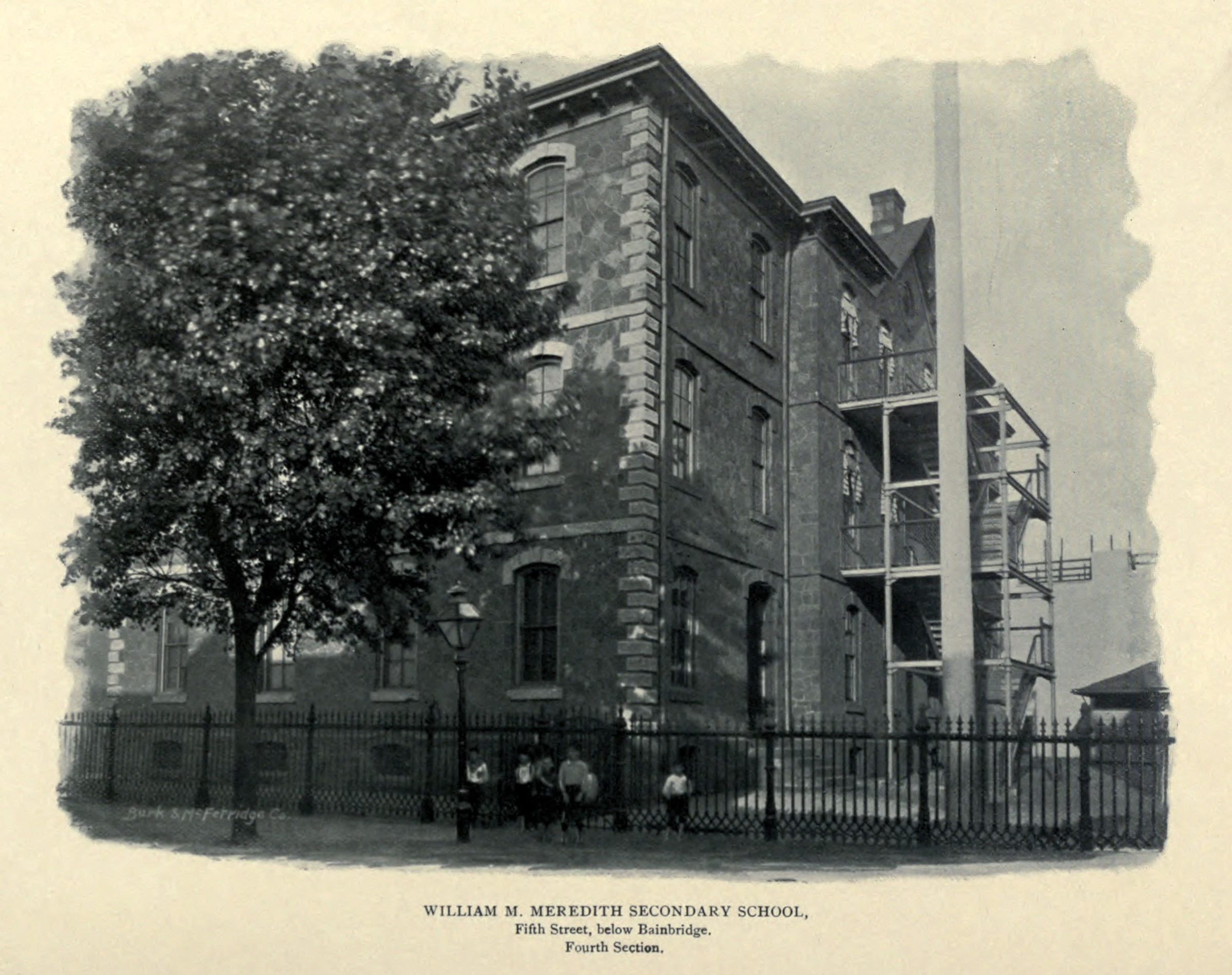
A photo of the original building in 1897

The existence of Meredith can be traced as far back to sometime around 1875 where it first appeared on the 1875 Philadelphia Atlas Map. This likely coincided with the town of Southwark's (now the neighborhood of Queen Village) integration into the city of Philadelphia. There is currently no known date for when the original Meredith building was constructed, however there exists one photo from "The public schools of Philadelphia : Historical, Biographical, Statistical", a 707-page document outlining the Philadelphia public school system circa 1897 and two from the Philadelphia Department of Records. The two pictures from the Department of Records are dated August 1, 1911. The public school document also gives the name of the principal in 1897, "Mary F. Belcher". The building was likely demolished as the neighborhood saw its population grow during the early 20th century, requiring a larger building for its students. The Art Deco styled building still stands today.

=== 20th century ===
The historic school building was designed by Irwin T. Catharine and built in 1930–1931. It is a 16 bay, yellow, white, and brown brick building on a limestone base in the Art Deco-style. It features pronounced molded brick mullions, two Gothic arched entrances, and brick piers.

Kristen M. Graham of The Philadelphia Inquirer wrote that Meredith had been "small and failing". As a way of desegregating the school, the district opened an arts program. It was added to the National Register of Historic Places in 1986. Graham wrote that after the 1970s "Gradually, Meredith turned around." In 2011 Graham wrote that Meredith was "small but high-achieving", and the following year she stated that Meredith was one of "the district's stronger neighborhood schools".

Circa 1993 Stuart Cooperstein became the principal, and he served in the position until 2008. Cooperstein stated in 2008 that the staff and teachers have a high level of devotion to students, and Graham wrote that the parent organization, which had financed the cafeteria's air conditioning system through fundraisers, was devoted. Graham added that the school had retained many of its art-related programs, including drama, music, and visual arts, despite budget cuts.

=== 21st century ===
In 2011, the district announced that it was cutting $30,370 ($43465.94 inflation-adjusted) from the school's budget. To prevent the elimination of support staff positions parents held a fundraiser: teachers raised about $5,000 ($7156.07 inflation-adjusted) and parents raised over $15,000 ($21468.2 inflation-adjusted)

In 2017, there was consideration of establishing a lottery in order to enter the kindergarten at Meredith as there were too many families seeking to send children to the school. Several area parents felt anxiety towards this possibility, as they specifically bought houses or rented apartments in the Meredith catchment area so they could use the school.

In 2018, the school was awarded the National Blue Ribbon award.

In 2019, one of the school's teachers, Lea DiRusso was exposed to cancer from Meredith Elementary asbestos. This led a talk with the School District of Philadelphia which then removed asbestos from many school district buildings and schools.

== Student body ==
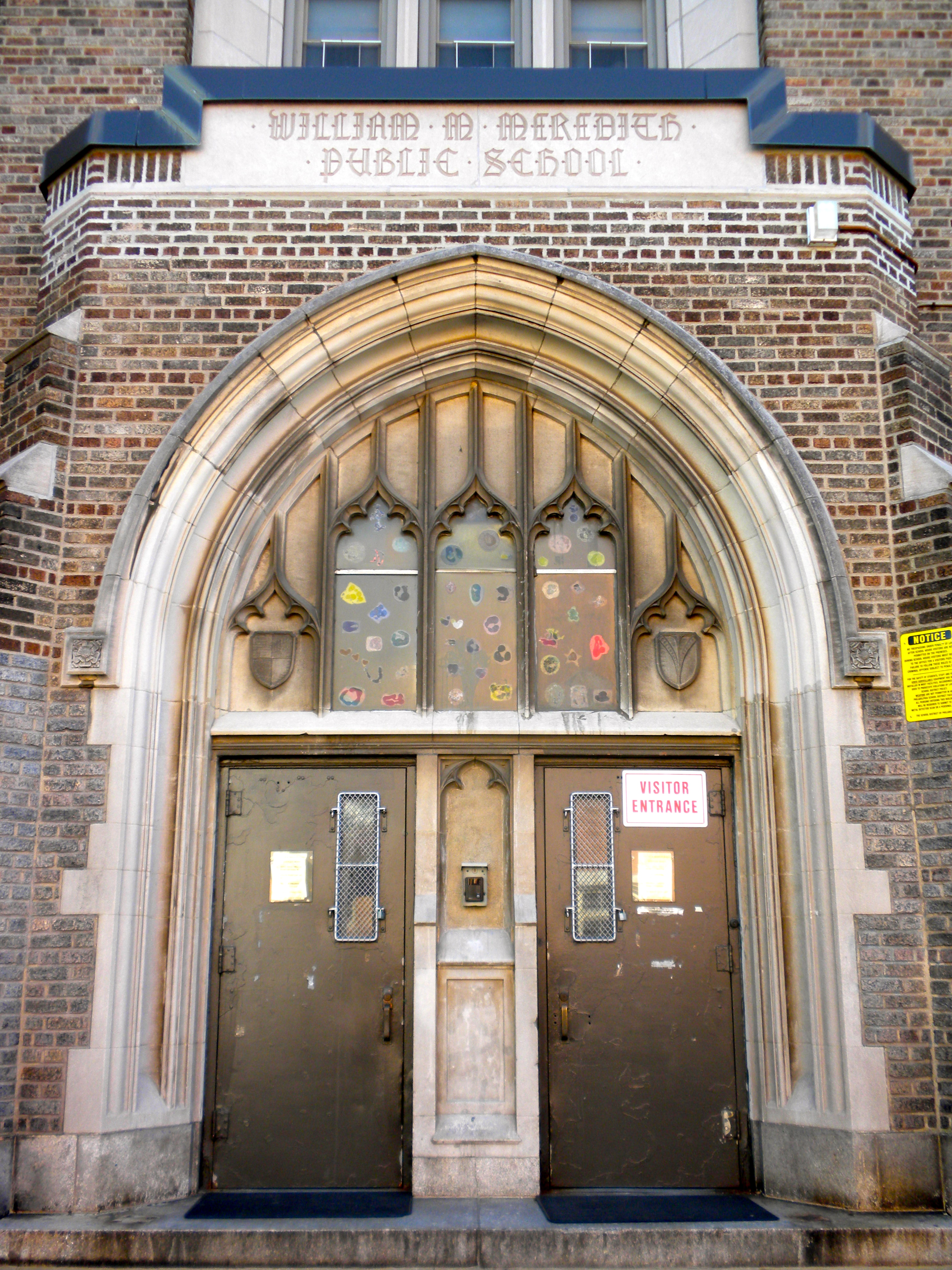
Entrance detail

In 2017 the school had 517 students. Most of them originated from the surrounding area while some commuted from elsewhere. Graham described Meredith's student body as "diverse and stable with high attendance". That year, 64% of the students were non-Hispanic white. That is compared with the School District of Philadelphia as a whole, which was 49% Black and 25% Hispanic/Latino as of the 2023-24 school year. As of 2018 about 20% of the students are below the poverty line, and that figure for 2017 was 26%.

== Feeder patterns ==
Neighborhoods assigned to Meredith are also assigned to Furness High School.
