= Nathaniel Irish House =

Historic house in Pennsylvania, United States

- U.S. National Register of Historic Places
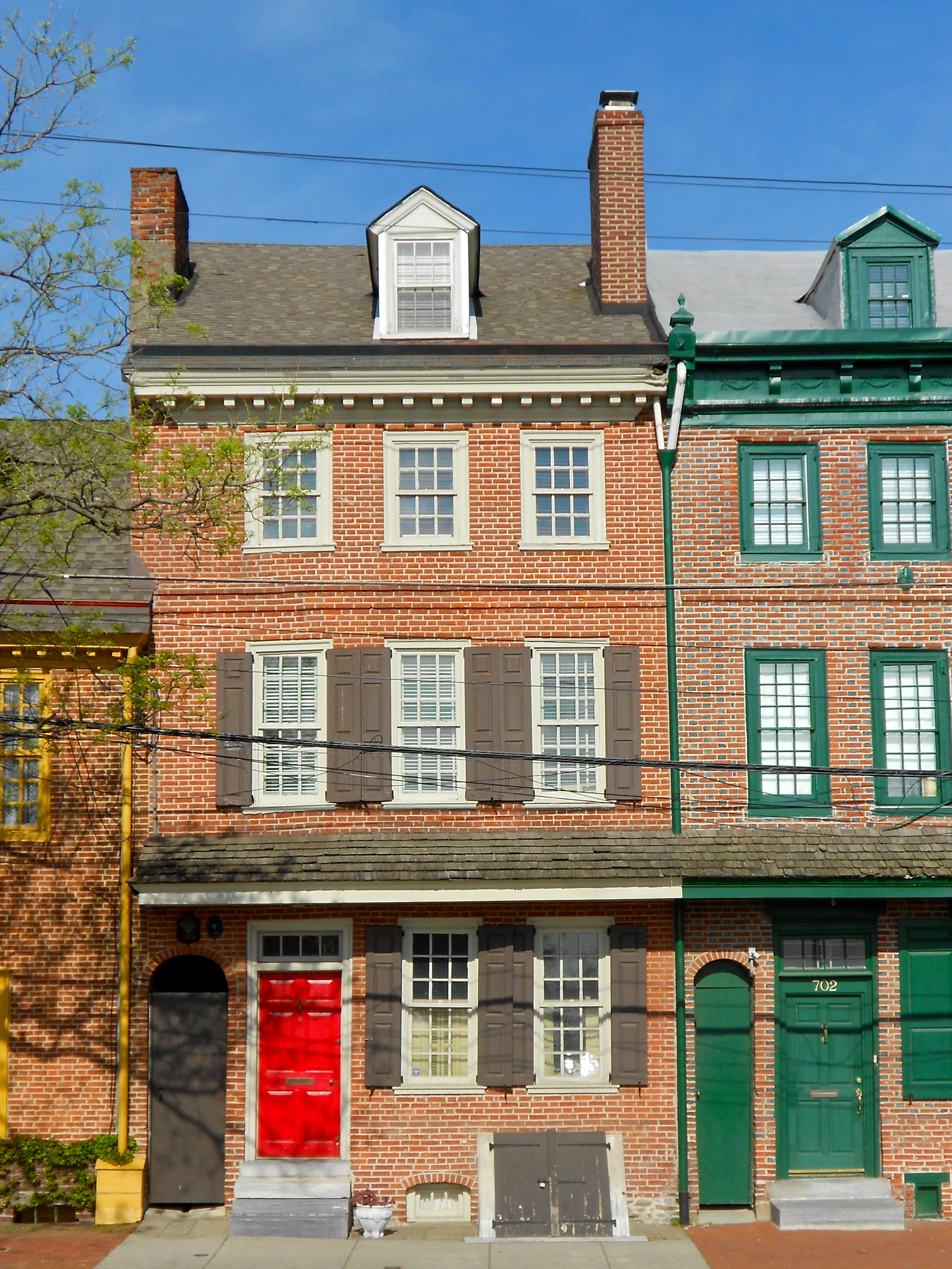
- Nathaniel Irish House in April 2015

- Location within Philadelphia Location within Pennsylvania Location within the United States
- Location: 704 S. Front St., Philadelphia, Pennsylvania, U.S.
- Coordinates: 39°56′23″N 75°8′42″W
- Area: 0.1 acres (0.040 ha)
- Built: 1763-1769
- Built by: Irish, Nathaniel
- NRHP reference No.: 72001160
- Added to NRHP: March 16, 1972

The Nathaniel Irish House is an historic home that is located in the Queen Village neighborhood of Philadelphia, Pennsylvania, United States.

Part of Philadelphia's South Front Street Historic District, it was added to the National Register of Historic Places in 1972.

== History and architectural features ==
Situated next to the Capt. Thomas Moore House, this historic structure was built between 1763 and 1769, and is a 3 1/2-story, three-bay, brick rowhouse. It has a two-story, attached rear building and a steep gable roof with dormers. The interior features seven fireplaces. This residence and the adjoining houses were built by Nathaniel Irish.

== Gallery ==
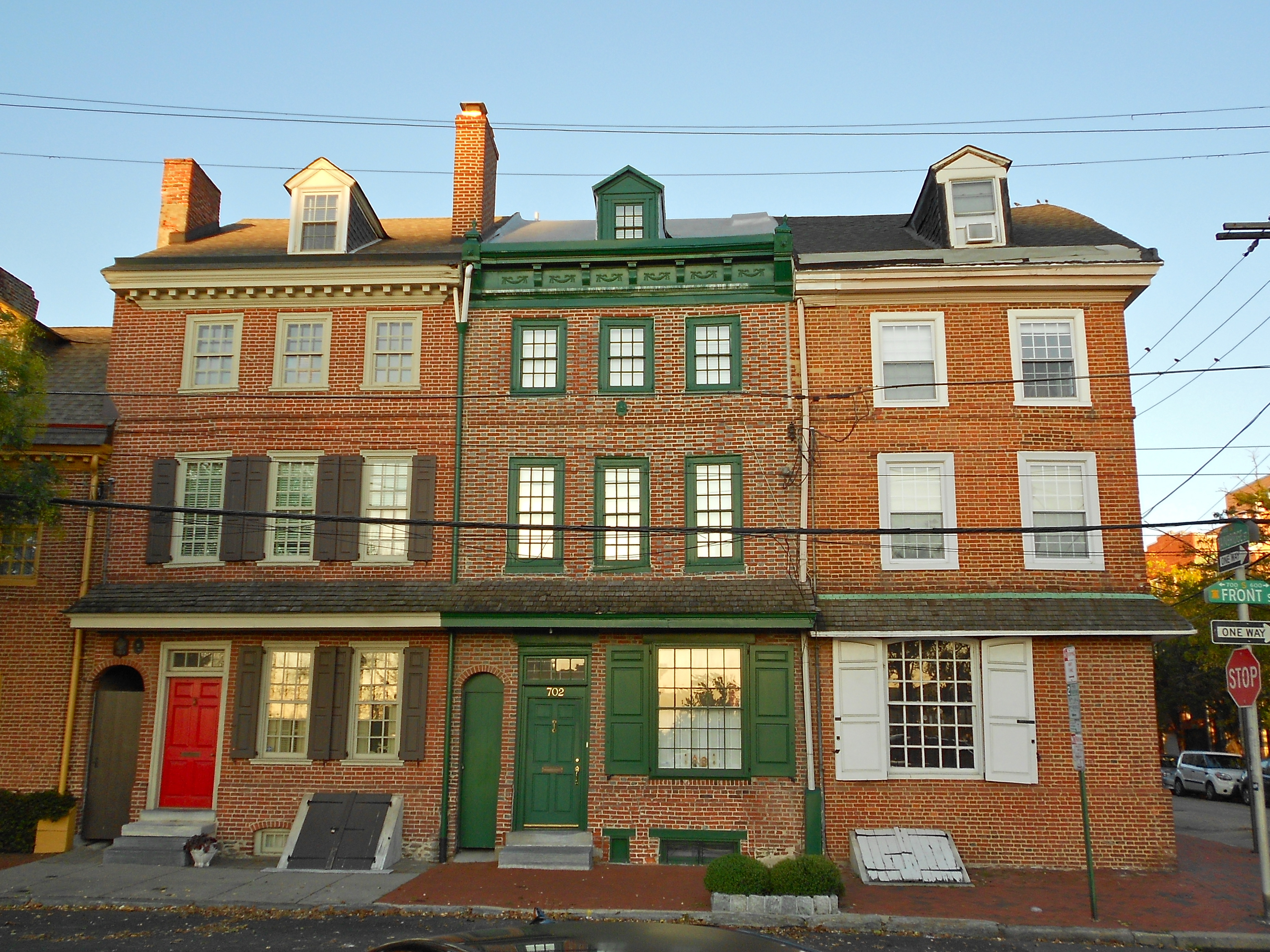
Nathaniel Irish House (left) in 2013

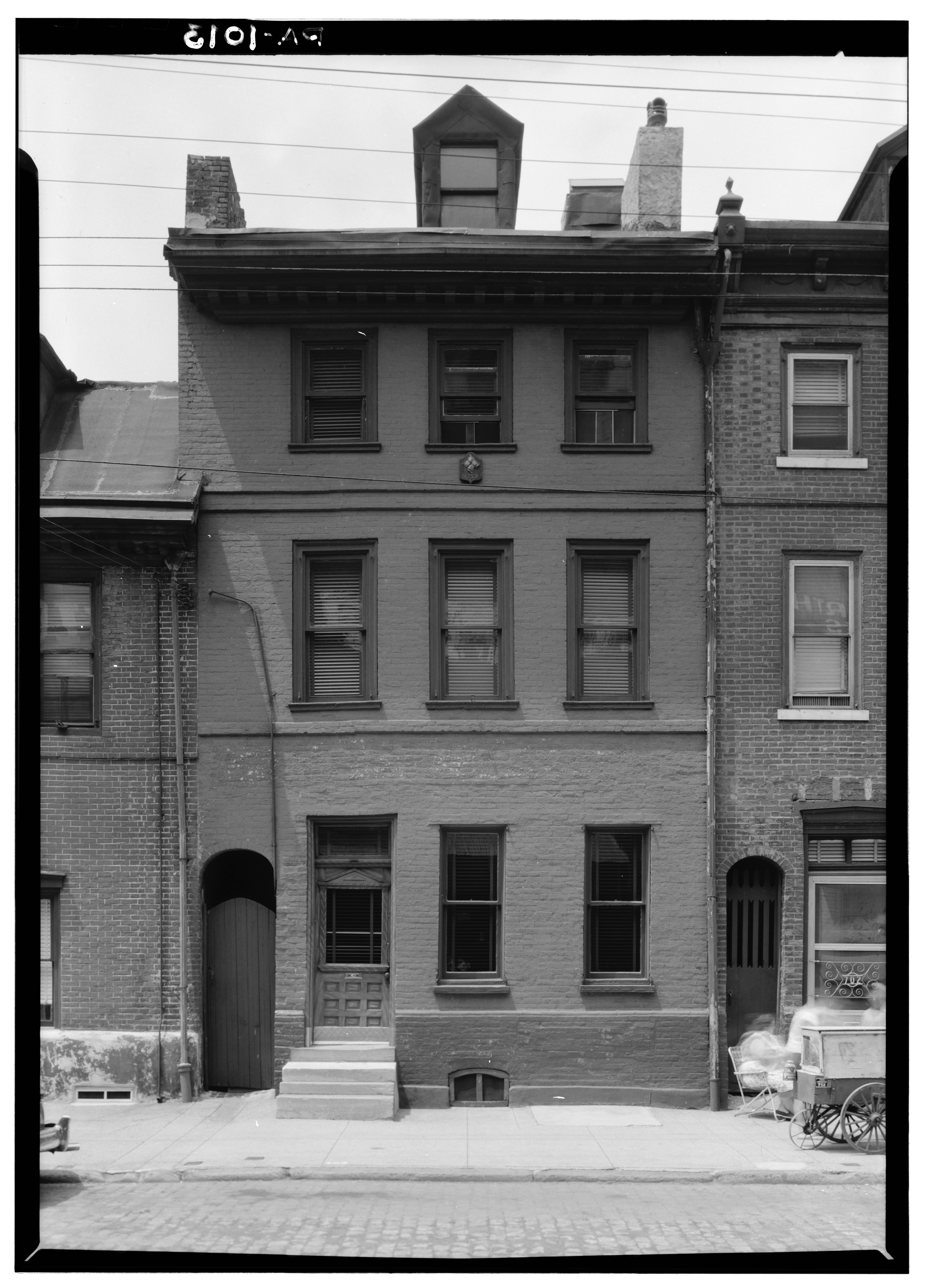
Historic American Buildings Survey photo, 1959

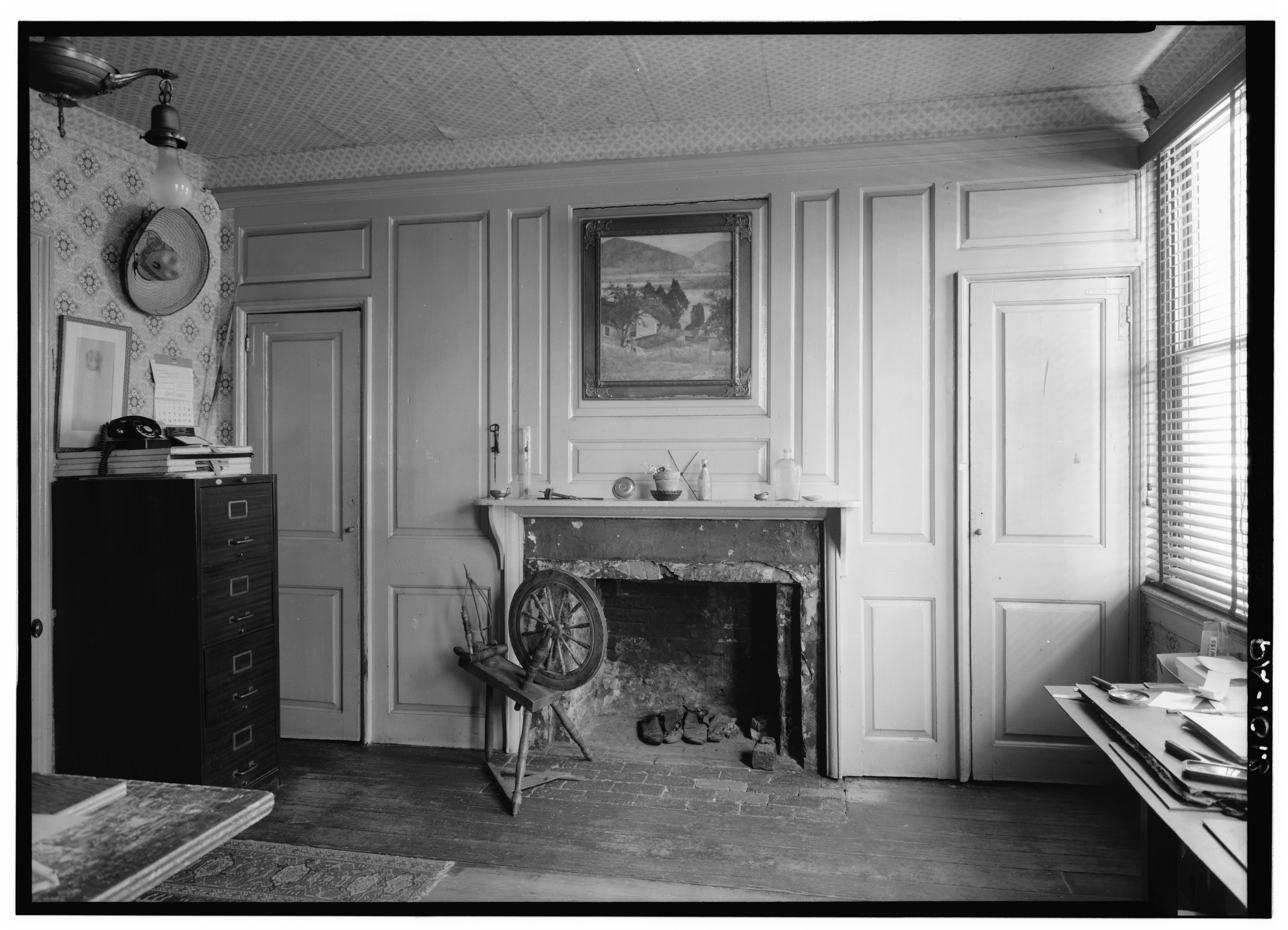
Second-floor, front room, Nathaniel Irish House, 1959
