= Widow Maloby's Tavern =

- U.S. National Register of Historic Places
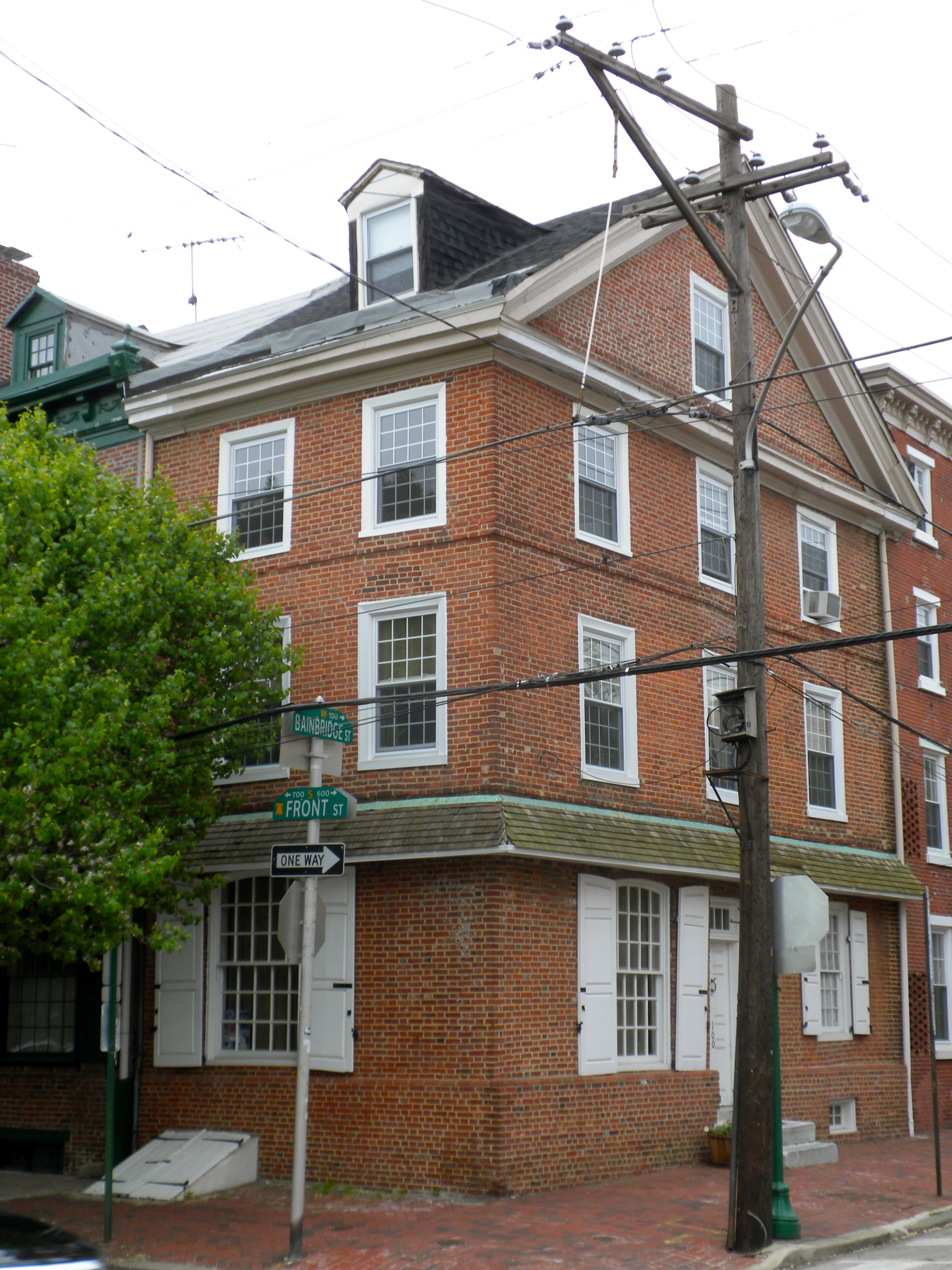
- Widow Maloby's Tavern in 2010.

- Location within Philadelphia Location within Pennsylvania Location within the United States
- Location: 700 South Front Street, South Philadelphia, Pennsylvania
- Coordinates: 39°56′23″N 75°8′42″W
- Area: less than one acre
- Built: 1764
- NRHP reference No.: 72001175
- Added to NRHP: March 16, 1972

The Widow Maloby's Tavern is an historic tavern building in the Queen Village section of South Philadelphia, Pennsylvania, United States.

Part of the South Front Street Historic District, it was added to the National Register of Historic Places on March 16, 1972.

== History and architectural features ==
Built in 1764 in Philadelphia's former Southwark district for Thomas Maloby (alternate spelling "Mallaby"), a rigger in Philadelphia's large shipping industry, this historic structure was owner-occupied in 1765, according to zoning records held by the city of Philadelphia. The owners, Maloby and his wife, Christiana, operated a bar room in the building's front parlor and a dining room in the back parlor, which also served as their family's personal dining room. That back parlor was erected adjacent to a small kitchen area at the back of the home during the home's original construction period.

During its first months of operation, the tavern supplemented the shipping industry wages that Maloby brought in, but this soon changed when he died in 1765. Ownership of the property was subsequently transferred to his widow, who continued to operate the tavern until her death. Ownership of the property was subsequently transferred.

Sold to different owners during the late nineteenth century, those owners opted to use the residential structure as an income property, but did not live there. They did, however, renovate it to remove the kitchen and add an extension at the back of the structure.

A three-and-one-half-story, three-bay by two-bay, brick rowhouse that was originally painted yellow, it remained a tavern and community gathering place for more than a century.

== Gallery ==
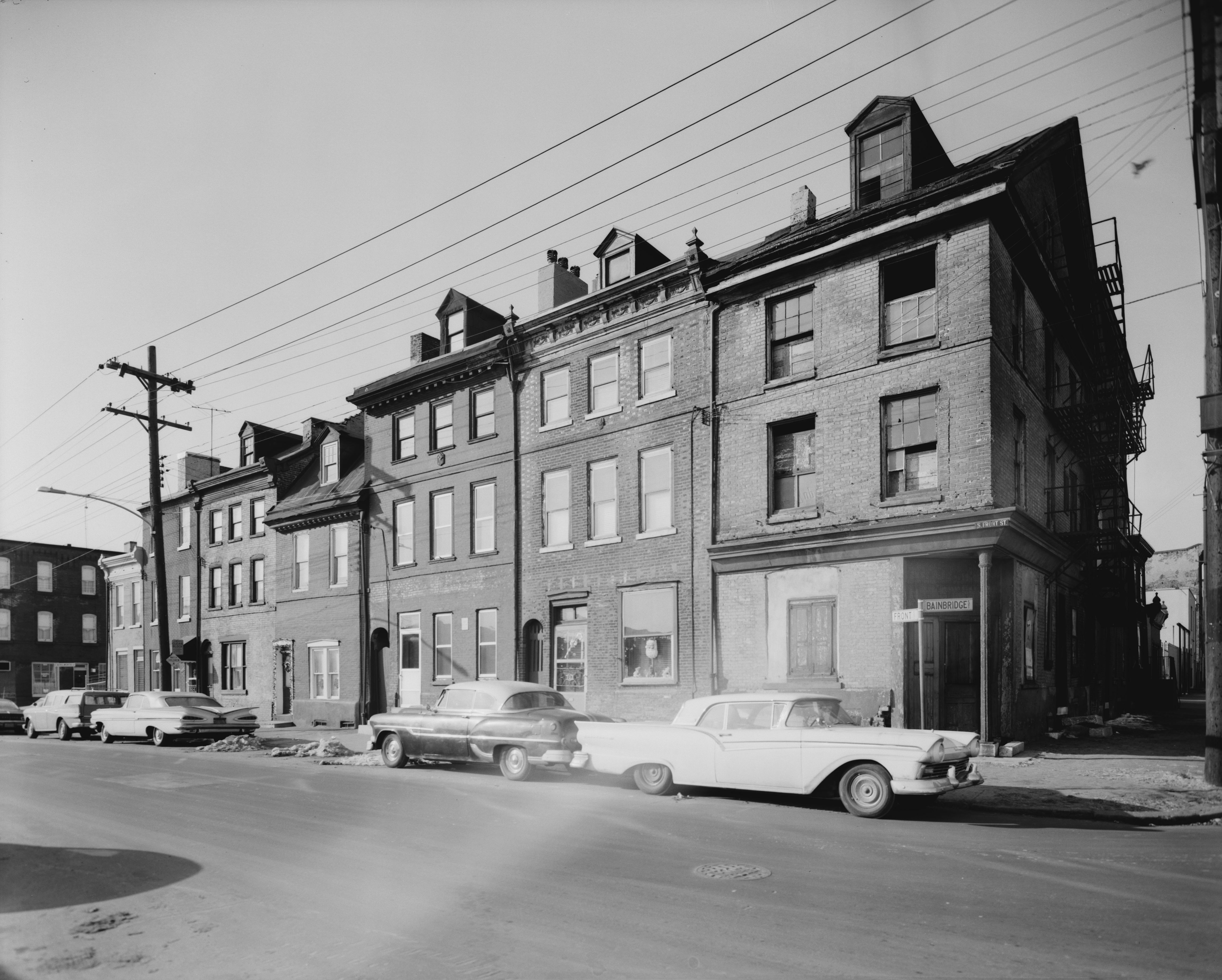
The 700 block of South Front Street in 1961 with Widow Maloby's Tavern first on the right

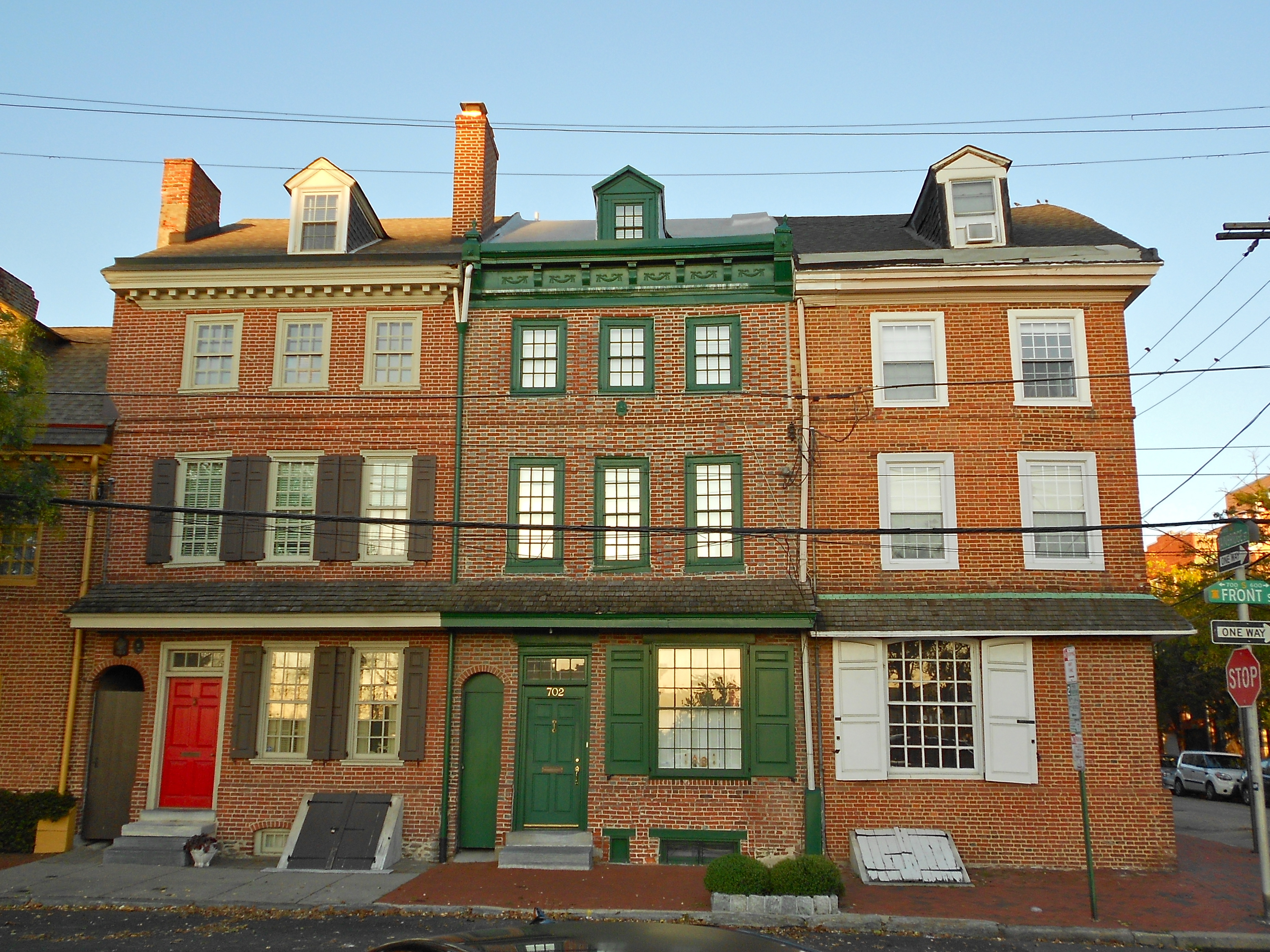
700-704 S. Front in 2013, the tavern is on the right
