= Adelphia (fancies) =

Adelphia New Years Association is one of four Fancy mother clubs in Philadelphia's centuries old Mummers Parade. They are the first new Fancy added to the Parade since Hog Island in 1942. Based in Wilmington, Delaware, they are the first Fancy formed out of state.

Unlike most older clubs, they do not have a clubhouse, warehouse full of equipment or significant funding from paid events. They are named after Adelphia Avenue in Wilmington, where one of the members of the founding family lives—they meet in his garage and his basement serves as their costume shop. "free of the undercutting of today's parade clubs".

Their first march in 2008 included all-new costumes and a performance at Washington Avenue. Most Fancies reuse portions of their costumes and do not drill at Washington Avenue. They placed last in their division that year.

== Record highlights ==
- First prize, Fancy Trio: 2008
- First prize, King Clown: 2008
- The club placed fourth (out of four) in 2008

== See also ==
- Two Street
