= Dickinson Square West, Philadelphia =

Neighborhood in Philadelphia, US

Dickinson Square West
- Neighborhood of Philadelphia
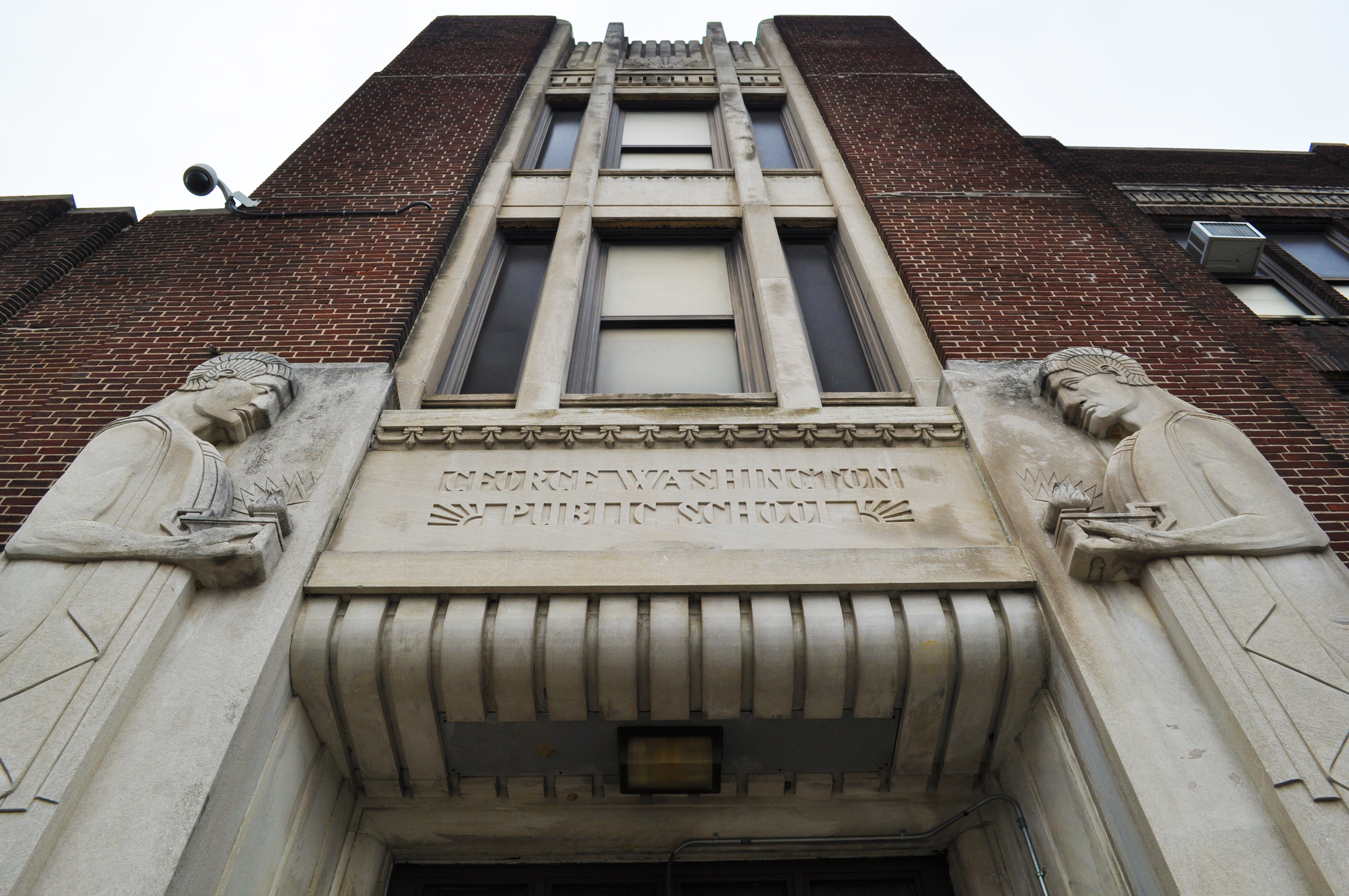
- Vare-Washington Elementary School

- Location within Philadelphia
- Country: United States
- State: Pennsylvania
- County: Philadelphia
- City: Philadelphia
- Area codes: 215, 267, 445

Dickinson Square West is a neighborhood in South Philadelphia, Pennsylvania, United States bordered by neighborhoods Queen Village to the north, Whitman to the south, Pennsport to the east and Passyunk Square and East Passyunk Crossing to the west. The neighborhood was previously referred to as "Dickinson Narrows", but was officially reestablished as "Dickinson Square West" in 2013 by the Registered Community Organization, Dickinson Square West Civic Association, located within its boundaries. In October, 2018, The Dickinson Square West Civic Association passed an amendment to expand the southern boundary from Mifflin Street to Snyder Ave

== Boundaries ==
The boundaries of Dickinson Square West are Washington Avenue to Snyder Avenue, and Fourth to Sixth streets.

== History ==
Long before William Penn and the founding of the city of Philadelphia, or even the arrival of Swedish settlers, the Lenni Lenape Indians claimed the land they called Weccacoe (pleasant place), now known as South Philadelphia. In 1638, Weccacoe became part of New Sweden when the early Swedes established Fort Christina (now Wilmington, Delaware) and settled along the Delaware River as far north as present day Trenton, New Jersey.

The Dutch briefly claimed control of what is now southeastern Pennsylvania from the Swedes in 1655, but the land was quickly ceded to the British, and in 1682 the king of England granted a land charter for what is now Pennsylvania to William Penn. Penn renamed Weccacoe Southwark, after a neighborhood in London, England. Penn's new city of Philadelphia quickly grew along the Delaware River waterfront and spilled over its original southern boundary of Cedar Street (now South Street) by the early 18th century. By 1687, the Southwark District (now South Philadelphia) was divided into two townships, which retained their original American Indian names, Moyamensing (pigeon droppings) and Passyunk (in the valley).

Provincial secretary Richard Peters noted the dramatic changes in Southwark's appearance as early as 1743, when he wrote to Governor Thomas Penn,"Southwark is getting greatly disfigured by erecting irregular and mean houses; thereby so marring its beauty that, when he shall return, he will lose his usual pretty walk to Wiccaco." Peters may have been referring to the wood-framed buildings that were common throughout Southwark. Whole blocks developed seemingly overnight; wooden houses were cheaper to construct, but harder to maintain.

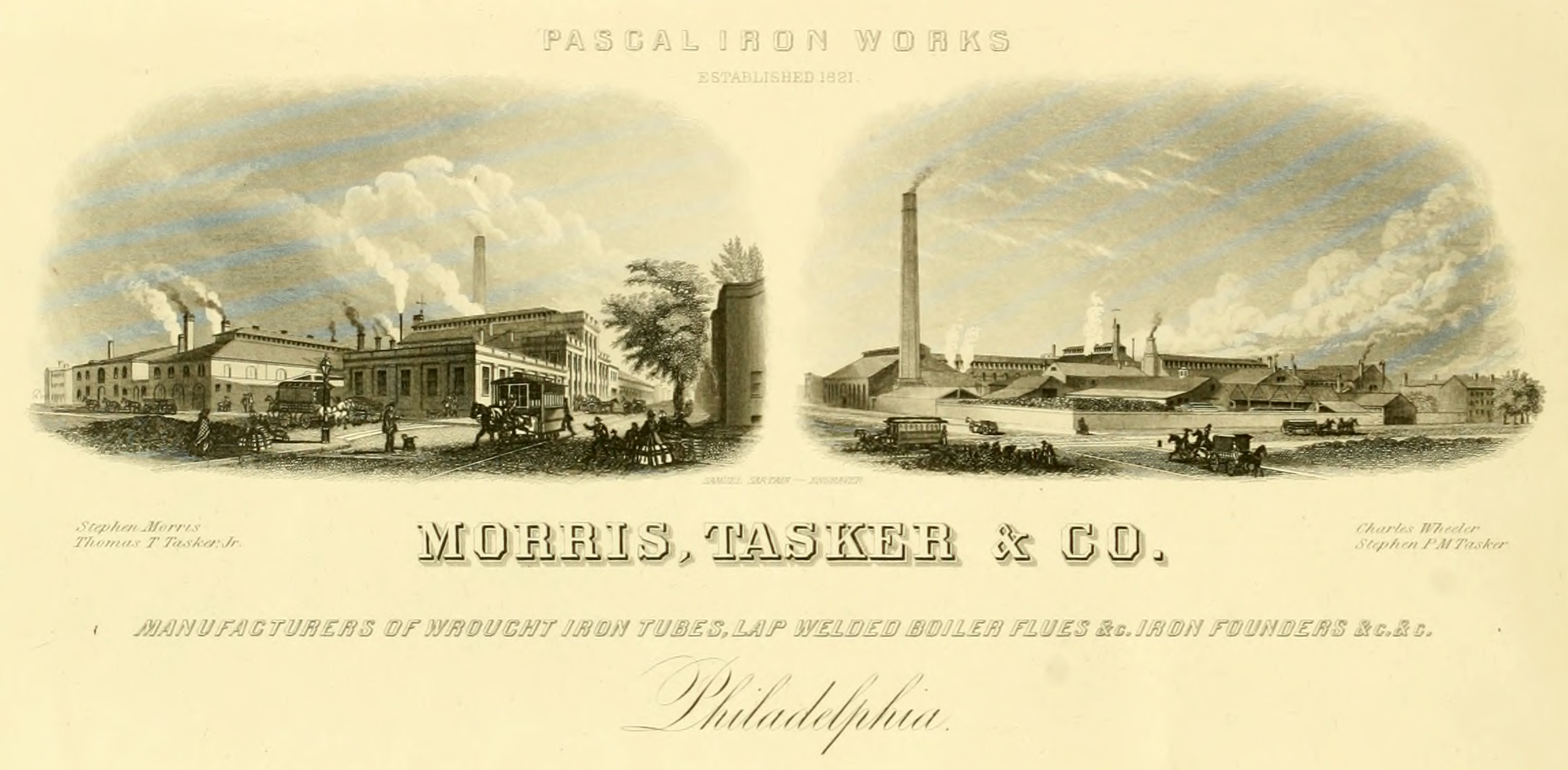
Pascal Iron Works Philadelphia (1861)

During the 19th century, Pascal Iron Works was situated in the squares between Moyamensing road and Fifth street, and Franklin (later Tasker) and Morris streets, then only the block between Fourth and Fifth streets. Stephen Paschall (1800-1865) formed Paschall Iron Works in 1821. In 1835 he was joined by his brother, Henry Morris, and Thomas T. Tasker, a Philadelphia preacher with a penchant for mechanics, to form S. P. Morris & Company. Sometime between 1835 and 1856, S. P. Morris & Co. became known as Morris Tasker & Morris, when another brother, Wistar Morris (1815-1891), took the place of retiree Stephen Paschall. By 1856, the organization's name had changed once more to Pascal Iron Works and Morris, Tasker & Company. These companies manufactured a number of different iron products throughout the 1800s, including stoves, grates, pipes, valves, fountains, radiators, and fire hydrants.

Newcomers in the early 20th century continued to move farther south. This is evidenced by the building of Mt. Sinai Hospital (recently demolished) in 1921 by Russian Jews between 4th and 5th streets along Reed street, between the community's initial center at 5th and Bainbridge streets and the area south of Snyder where it would relocate. By World War I, 7th Street, mostly south of Tasker Street, had become “a shopping mecca,” where Jewish merchants sold anything that could be bought. It would become the major artery of the Jewish neighborhood in South Philadelphia, surrounded by important community centers like the Workmen's Circle on 6th Street and Tasker Street. After World War II, many of South Philadelphia's ethnic enclaves began a long and steady decline as the children of new immigrants left the neighborhood for other parts of the city and nearby suburbs.

== Schools ==
- Vare-Washington School (K-8), 1198 S. 5th Street.

== Parks, playgrounds and gardens ==
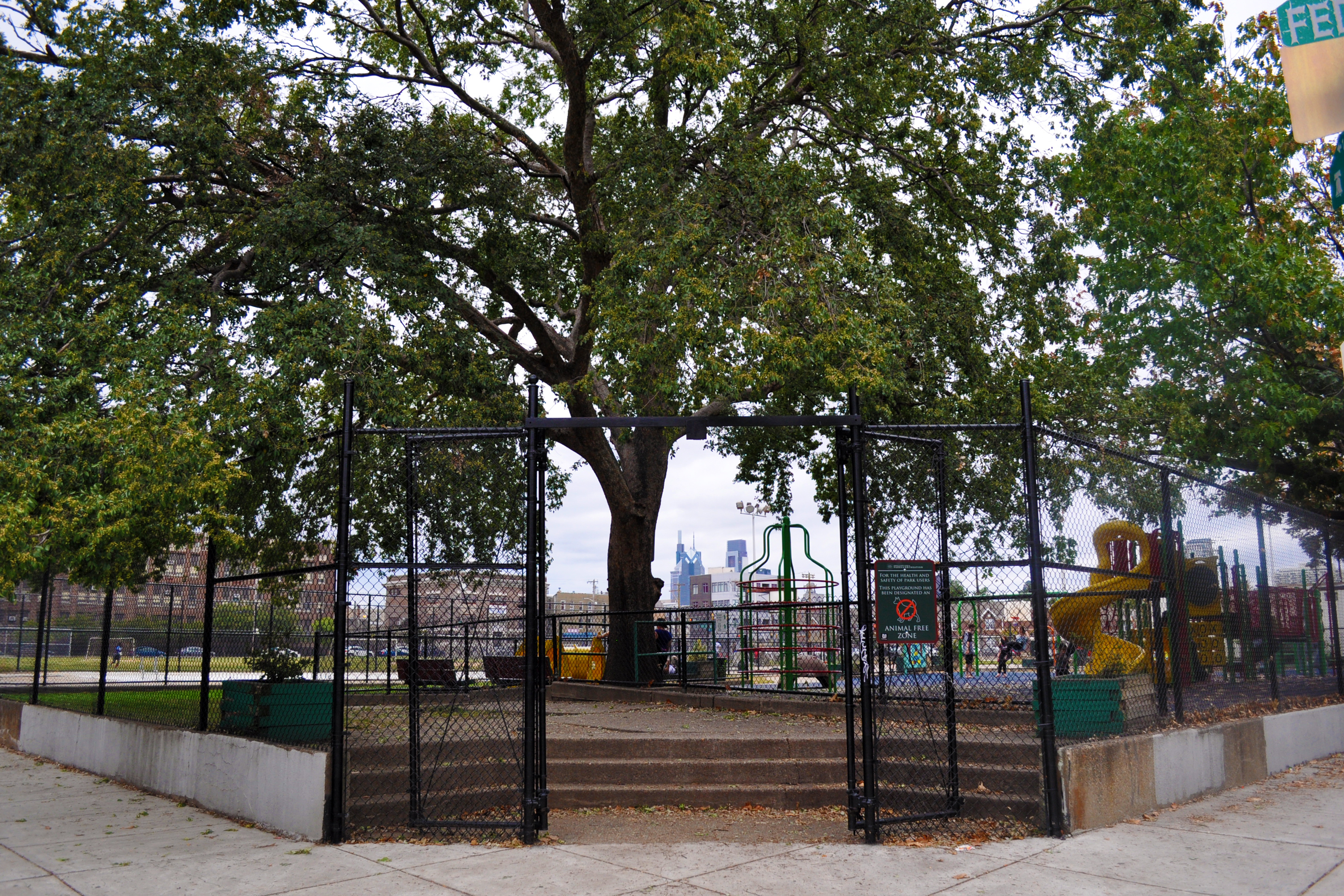
Solomon Sacks Playground

- Moore Street Community Garden, 1736-1738 S. 5th Street.
- Sacks Playground, 400 Washington Avenue.
- Manton Street Park and Community Garden, 405 Manton Street.

== Landmarks ==
- Mount Sinai Hospital (opened 1905, shuttered 1997, demolished 2015–2016)
- Free Library of Philadelphia, Southwark Branch (opened 1912, now Philadelphia Overseas Chinese Association), 1108 S 5th Street.
- Vare-Washington School, National Register of Historic Places (added 1986), 1198 S. 5th Street.
- Places of worship:
  - Mount Moriah Temple Baptist Church, 410 Wharton Street.
  - Russell Tabernacle C.M.E. Church, 518 Wharton Street.
  - Gilead Praise & Worship Center INC, 1837 S. 5th Street.
