= George Washington Hotel (New York City) =

Hotel in Manhattan, New York

- U.S. National Register of Historic Places
- New York State Register of Historic Places
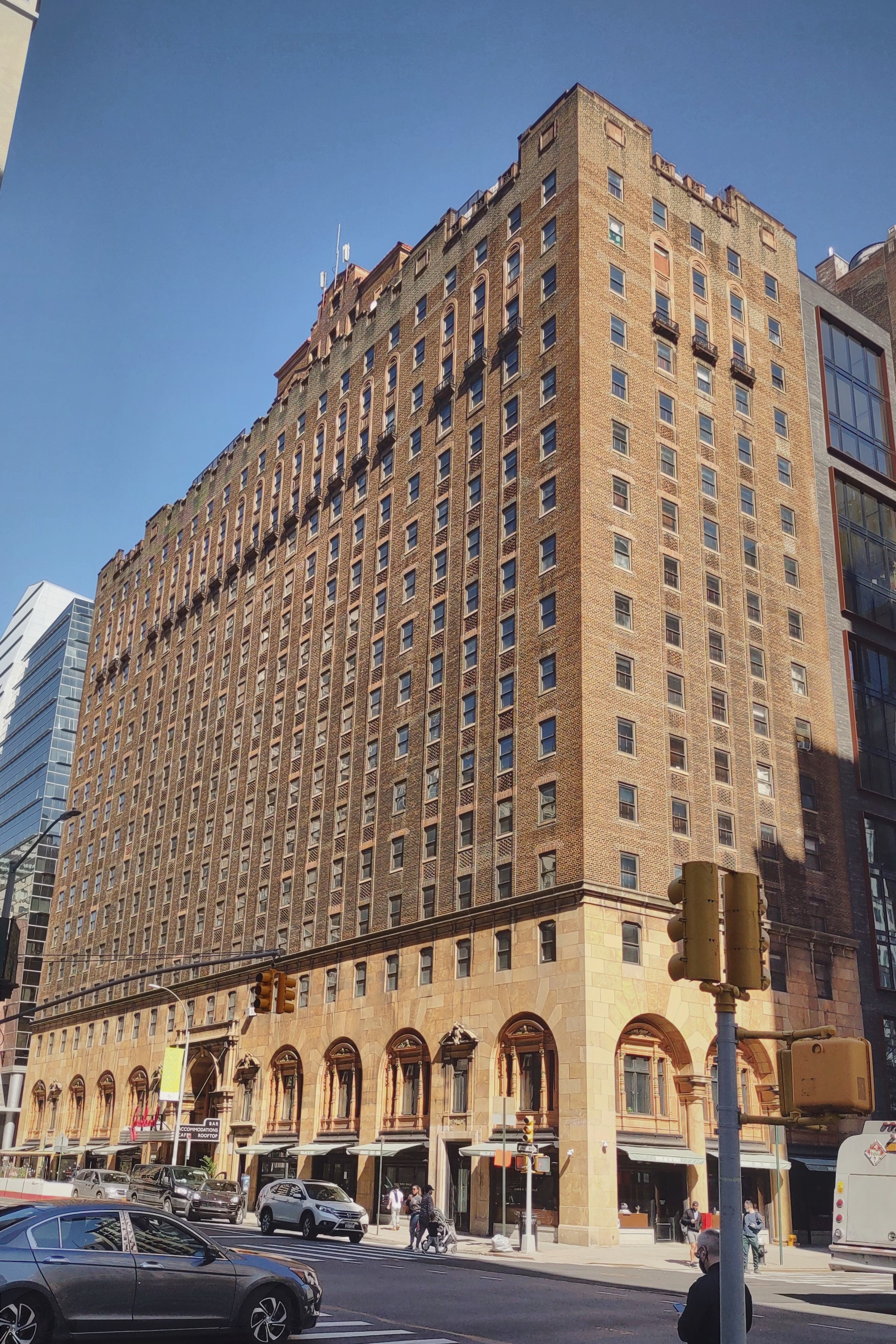
- West and South sides, 2021

- Location within New York City
- Location: Gramercy Park, Manhattan, New York, NY
- Coordinates: 40.739627°N 73.984647°W
- Built: 1930
- Architects: Frank Mills Andrews, John Peterkin
- Architectural style: French Renaissance Revival
- Website: freehandhotels.com/new-york/
- NRHP reference No.: 100003931
- NYSRHP No.: 06101.010715

Significant dates
- Added to NRHP: May 20, 2019
- Designated NYSRHP: March 27, 2019

The Freehand New York Hotel is located at 23 Lexington Avenue (between 23rd Street and 24th Street) in Gramercy Park, Manhattan, New York City.

== History ==
Located adjacent to the Baruch College and School of Visual Arts campuses, the hotel was opened in 1928 as the George Washington Hotel. At different times it has been used both as a brothel and as a boot-legging house during Prohibition.

In the 1980s, the hotel was raided by the police. For a period of time the building was in receivership; its demolition was prevented by support from a local historical society. The hotel was later purchased at auction, and space was leased to not-for-profit Educational Housing Services in the mid-1990s. Much of the space was under sublease to the School of Visual Arts except for apartments still occupied by original (non-student) tenants who pay stabilized rent, and who are still protected under NYC rent laws. SVA broke the sublease and built a new dorm on 24th Street in mid-2016. The ground lease for the property was bought by investment firm Alliance Bernstein in 2016. The company developed the property into a hotel which is now known as the Freehand/New York.

In 2019 it was listed on the National Register of Historic Places. In 2025, the Historic Districts Council, in partnership with the Rose Hill/Kips Bay Coalition, requested the New York City Landmarks Preservation Commission evaluate the building for potential designation as an individual landmark.

== Notable people ==
The building was occupied by many famous writers, musicians, and poets. These include W. H. Auden and Christopher Isherwood, who lived there in the 1930s; Auden even dedicated a poem to the hotel. Another was Keith Haring, who lived in the building as a student at SVA.

In the late 1960s, Minoru Yamasaki and a team of architects drafted the early plans for the World Trade Center in a suite at the George Washington. From 1975 until his death in 1979 Al Hodge, who played Captain Video in the popular children's 1950s TV series, lived in an inexpensive rental unit in the hotel. In the 1990s Dee Dee Ramone occupied a room there, as did playwright Jeffrey Stanley and comedian Judah Friedlander.

== See also ==
- List of former hotels in Manhattan
- National Register of Historic Places listings in Manhattan from 14th to 59th Streets
