= Congregation Shivtei Yeshuron-Ezras Israel =

Unaffiliated Jewish synagogue in Philadelphia, Pennsylvania, US

Congregation Shivtei Yeshuron Ezras Israel
- Hebrew: קאנגרעגיישאן שבטי ישורון עזרת ישראל
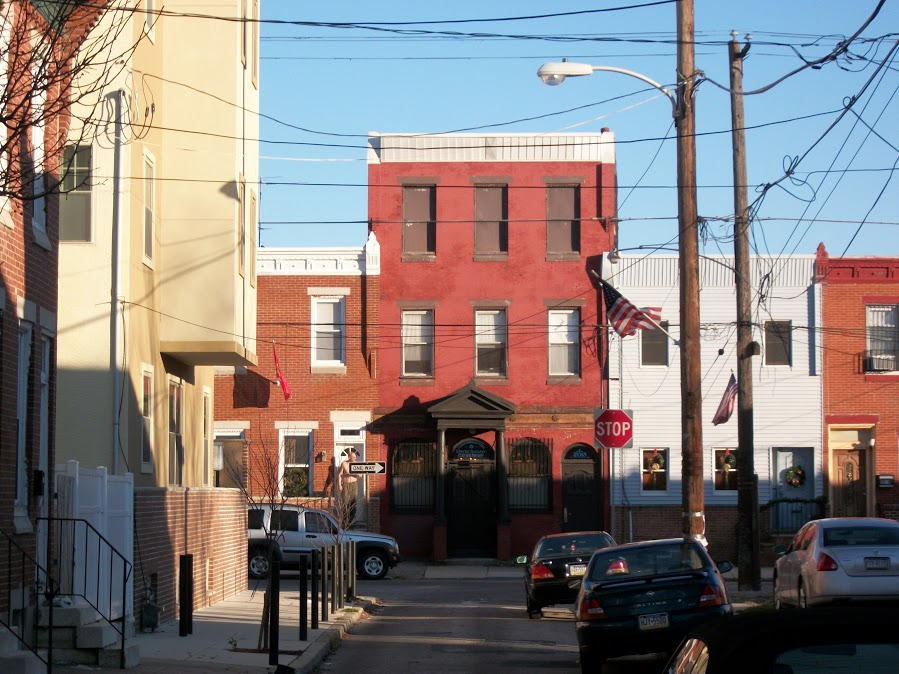
- The synagogue in 2012

- Location in Philadelphia

Religion
- Affiliation: Judaism
- Rite: Unaffiliated, yet Nusach Ashkenaz
- Ecclesiastical or organisational status: Synagogue
- Leadership: Lay led
- Status: Active

Location
- Location: 2015 S 4th Street, Philadelphia, Pennsylvania
- Country: United States
- Coordinates: 39°55′23″N 75°09′12″W

Architecture
- Style: Synagogue
- Established: 1876 (as a congregation); 1892 (Chartered by the State)
- Completed: 1909
- Capacity: 80 worshippers

Website
- thelittleshul.org

Congregation Shivtei Yeshuron Ezras Israel (Hebrew: קאנגרעגיישאן שבטי ישורון עזרת ישראל) is an unaffiliated Jewish congregation and synagogue located in the Pennsport neighborhood of South Philadelphia, Pennsylvania, in the United States. The congregation moved to its current location in 1909 and had purchased the building by 1917. It is South Philadelphia's oldest continuously active synagogue building and congregation. Religious services are lay led and conducted in the Ashkenazi rite. The congregation offers cultural events and tours open to the public.

== Congregation History ==
The congregation first organized itself in 1876 at 322 Bainbridge Street and chartered itself in 1892 as "Shivtei Yeshurun". As the population of Jews from Eastern Europe increased in Philadelphia between 1881 and 1924, the Jewish community extended from Society Hill south to Oregon Avenue. The congregation moved to its current location at 2015 South 4th Street, near 4th Street and Snyder Avenue, in 1909. Community craftsman redesigned the interior and the synagogue became an active synagogue along with a meeting place for community beneficial societies and events.

Max Karafin came to Philadelphia from Odessa in the 1920s, and served as cantor, conducting services. His wife, Baila Karafin, helped to start the Ladies Auxiliary during the 1930s' Great Depression in support of community members in need.

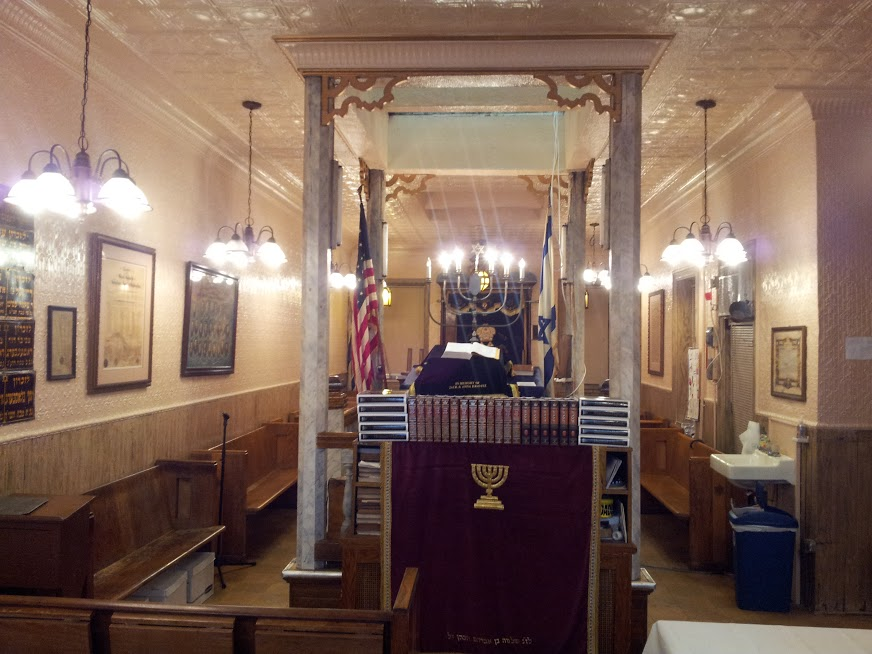
Synagogue interior in 2014

South Philadelphia's urban Jewish community contracted in the years following World War II when many families moved to the suburbs and exurbs. Shivtei Yeshuron survived by virtue of several mergers. In 1961, Shivtei Yeshuron combined with Mishkan Israel and Raim Ahuvim (Anshe Kalker, who held Nusach Sefard). In 1968, Shivtei Yeshuron welcomed the merger of Heisner, and of Congregation Ezras Israel, formerly of Sixth and Cantrell Streets, to become Shivtei Yeshurun - Heisner Ezras Israel. Shivtei Yeshuron Ezras Israel subsequently absorbed the members of six other area synagogues that closed between 1970 and 1983.

Rabbi Wilner led High Holiday services from the 1970s until 2005. Rabbi Yadidya Dagovitz led Sabbath services at the synagogue from the 1980s until his death in 2004, and joined R. Wilner for the High Holidays. The congregation was one of two active South Philadelphia synagogues until the 2019 opening of the South Philadelphia Shtiebel. The congregation meets for Sabbath services the first Saturday of the month; conducts High Holiday services; has presented speakers, music, and community events; and is a member of the Kehillah of Center City.

== Building ==
The congregation's building was built between 1886 and 1895 as a retail storefront with living quarters on the second and third floors, and a horse stable at its rear-facing Moyamensing Avenue. Many members were skilled craftsmen, trained as tinworkers, carpenters and electricians, and they did extensive renovations when the congregation moved to the building. They built the ark on the east wall and dedicated it in 1916. They installed exterior columns on the entrance that distinguish the building from the other residential homes and corner stores along the street. The sanctuary walls and ceilings are made of tin. City maps show the building's transformation from store to synagogue took place between 1914 and 1919.

In 2007, the rear wall of the old stable building collapsed, endangering the structure including the sanctuary. The city condemned the entire property and the synagogue risked losing the building if it did not reconstruct. The synagogue leadership, with critical support from local architect and historian Joel Spivak, raised funds and began to repair the building. Then-Councilman James F. Kenney, grew up in the neighborhood and offered to help preserve the historic community site. The congregation reopened for High Holiday services in 2008 and completed the renovations in 2009.

== Revitalization ==
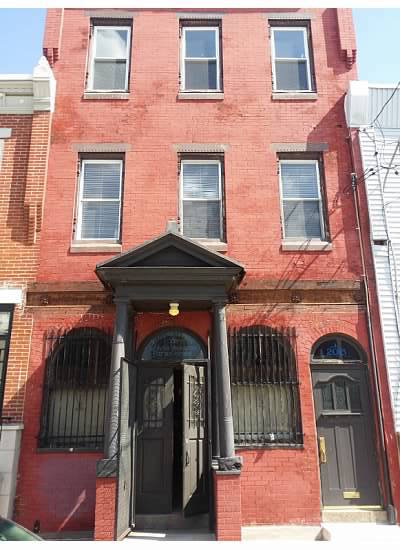
Synagogue exterior in 2016

The 2007 to 2009 renovations enabled the congregation to retain its building, and rebuild the synagogue as a Jewish and Philadelphia community destination.

The synagogue raised funds and repaired its primary Torah scroll in 2010.

The synagogue hosted a Hanukah party in December 2011, and arts event, "Studio Aggada: New Ideas Lab" in January 2012 with Brooklyn's Jewish Art Now.

In June 2013, Shivtei Yeshuron was a host site for the Hidden City Philadelphia Festival which highlighted its history in South Philadelphia and standing as one of the last pre-World War I synagogues. The synagogue hosted an interactive machine knitting laboratory, and served as a concert space for “Radical Jewish Music: A Concert Series” featuring Masada Book Two – The Book of Angels, by composer John Zorn, screened the film Punk Jews; and presented a Sunday morning speaker series. Zorn's compositions were performed by Shanir Ezra Blumenkranz (Abraxas: Book of Angels Volume 19), Erik Friedlander (Volac: Book of Angels Volume 8), and Uri Caine (Moloch: Book of Angels Volume 6).

Jeffrey Stanley presented a theatrical production in the synagogue's 1890s basement during the 2013 Philadelphia Fringe Festival. The Andy Statman Trio performed in concert at Shivtei Yeshuron in March 2014. Congregation Shivtei Yeshuron marked Holocaust Remembrance Day with a talk in April 2014. Former-Pennsylvania governor Ed Rendell cited a speaking commitment at the synagogue on June 1, 2014, that prevented him from being a passenger on a private Gulfstream IV business jet that had crashed the previous night, killing all on board.

The congregation erected a Sukkah in 2018 and welcomed its use by the wider Philadelphia community.

== Name ==
The English spelling of the congregation's name has evolved through its history. The congregation refers to itself in 2019 as Congregation Shivtei Yeshuron Ezras Israel. The 1901 American Jewish Year Book identifies the congregation as Shifte Yeshurun Anshe Philadelphia. The 1954 Philadelphia Directory of Streets and Information identifies the synagogue as Shivtai Jeshurun.

== See also ==
- Jewish Quarter of Philadelphia
- History of the Jews in Philadelphia

== Visual media ==
- Joe Brin (Producer) (February 20, 2019). SHIVTEI: Lost & Found. Philadelphia, Pennsylvania: The Magic of Drawing.
- David Berg (Interviewee); Mark Gerstein (Interviewer) (September 1, 2015). The Little Shul in Philadelphia. Amherst, Massachusetts: Yiddish Book Center.
- Ty Citerman, Adam D Gold, Douglas Yates, Ben Holmes (June 17, 2014). Bop Kabbalah at The Little Shul. Philadelphia, Pennsylvania: Kinan Faham.
- Ben Holmes, Patrick Farrell (June 15, 2014). Ben Holmes & Patrick Farrell at The Little Shul. Philadelphia, Pennsylvania: Kinan Faham.
- Walter Palmer (Director) (2014). Hidden City at Shivtei Yeshuron-Ezras Israel. Philadelphia, Pennsylvania: Walter Palmer.
- Jeffrey Stanley (August 18, 2013). Don't Be Alarmed. Philadelphia, Pennsylvania: Jefe's House.
- The Little Row House Shul. New York, New York: The Forward. July 5, 2013.
- Morris Levin, Rich Sisman, Joel Spivak (2013). Hidden City Festival - Shivtei Yeshuron. Philadelphia, Pennsylvania: Hidden City.
