= Southwark, Philadelphia =

Southwark District
- Former District
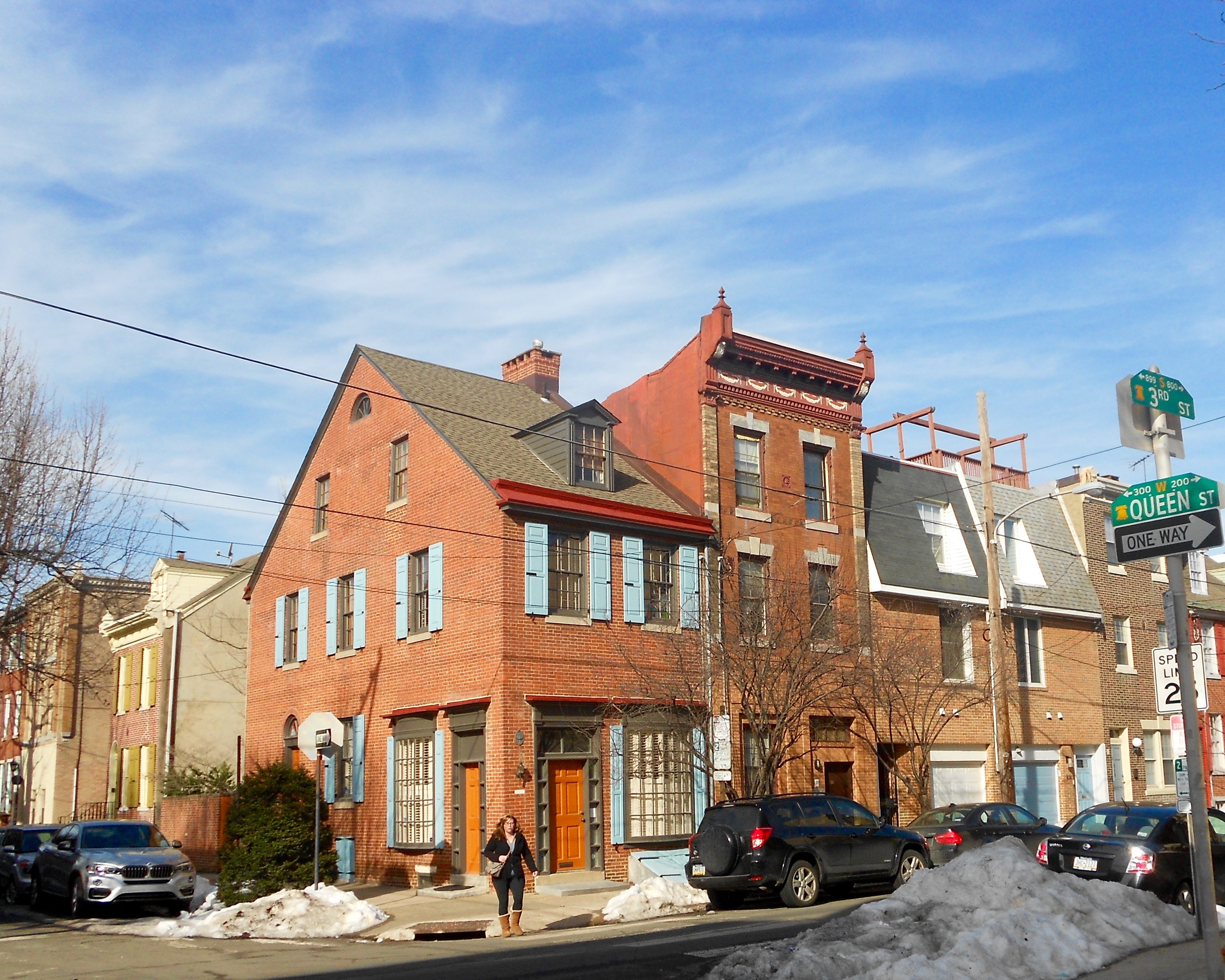
- Corner of 3rd and Queen Streets

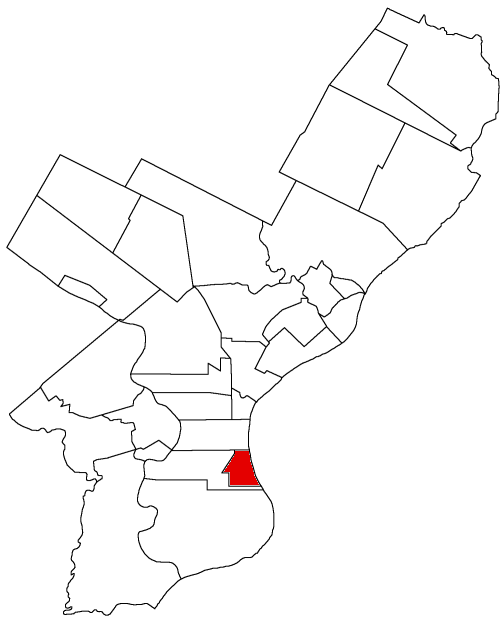
- Map of Philadelphia County, Pennsylvania highlighting Southwark District prior to the Act of Consolidation, 1854
- Coordinates: 39°56′16″N 75°08′52″W
- Country: United States
- State: Pennsylvania
- County: Philadelphia
- Time zone: UTC-5 (EST)
  - Summer (DST): UTC-4 (EDT)
- Area codes: 215, 267 and 445

- Southwark District
- U.S. National Register of Historic Places
- U.S. Historic district
- Location within Philadelphia Location within Pennsylvania Location within the United States
- Location: Bounded by Delaware, Washington Aves., 5th, Lombard, Front, and Catharine Sts., Philadelphia, Pennsylvania
- Area: 720 acres (290 ha)
- Built: 1703
- Architect: Multiple
- NRHP reference No.: 72001172
- Added to NRHP: May 19, 1972

Southwark was originally the Southwark District, a colonial-era municipality in Philadelphia County, Pennsylvania, United States. Today, it is a neighborhood in the South Philadelphia section of Philadelphia, Pennsylvania. Because of its location south of the early Philadelphia, the name was adopted in allusion to the borough of Southwark in the county of Surrey, England, just south of the city of London.

== History ==
Historical population
Year	Pop.	±%
1790	5,661	—
1800	9,621	+70.0%
1810	13,707	+42.5%
1820	14,713	+7.3%
1830	20,581	+39.9%
1840	27,548	+33.9%
1850	38,799	+40.8%

Southwark is one of the oldest English settlements in the County of Philadelphia. It is actually the oldest district founded by settlers in Philadelphia, as a result of its inclusion in the former Swedish colony of New Sweden. Southwark was originally a tract of ground on the fast land of the Neck, lying between Passyunk and Wicaco. Due to the populations of the Swedish settlements of Wicaco and Moyamensing, Southwark grew earlier than other parts of the county apart from the city of Philadelphia.

The General Assembly created the district of Southwark on May 14, 1762, to facilitate cooperation with regard to street-building. As early as 1838, the district had its own police force. Southwark was the location of the shipbuilding complex of Joshua Humphreys, the shipbuilder and naval architect who built the first six ships of the United States Navy and is known as the "Father of the U.S. Navy".

In 1854, when it was incorporated into the city of Philadelphia by the Act of Consolidation, the borough comprised the area bounded on the north by South Street, on the west by Passyunk Avenue from 5th and South to 10th and Reed; the boundary then ran along Reed Street, down 7th, and along Mifflin Street to the river.

Only a few traces of the name "Southwark" remain in this part of Philadelphia. The Southwark Post Office is located at 925 Dickinson Street. Other namesakes include Southwark Restaurant at 4th and Bainbridge Sts. and Southwark Development Corp., a public-housing project along Washington Avenue from 3rd to 5th Sts. Although not part of the Southwark District, the word "Southwark" is painted on a wall at 23rd Street and Washington Avenue.

In 1969, this area of Philadelphia was renamed, and the Northern portion is now commonly known as Queen Village. The neighborhood of Pennsport is the primary southern half of what was Southwark. The area is a diverse community, a multi-racial neighborhood of middle class, working class, and professionals.

The historic district, as defined by the National Register of Historic Places, is bounded by 5th Street on the west, Lombard Street on the north, Washington Avenue on the south, and Front, Catharine, and Queen Streets and Columbus Boulevard (formerly Delaware Avenue) on the east.

== Education ==
Residents are within the School District of Philadelphia.

Residents are zoned to Southwark School (K-8) and South Philadelphia High School.

The Vare-Washington School, which occupies the former George Washington School, is in proximity to Southwark. Persons zoned to Vare-Washington are also zoned to Furness High School. and residents of the former Abigail Vare School zone, are also zoned to Furness High School.

"The Swedish Church Southwark with the building of the Frigate Philadelphia," Plate 29 of Birch's Views of Philadelphia (1800)

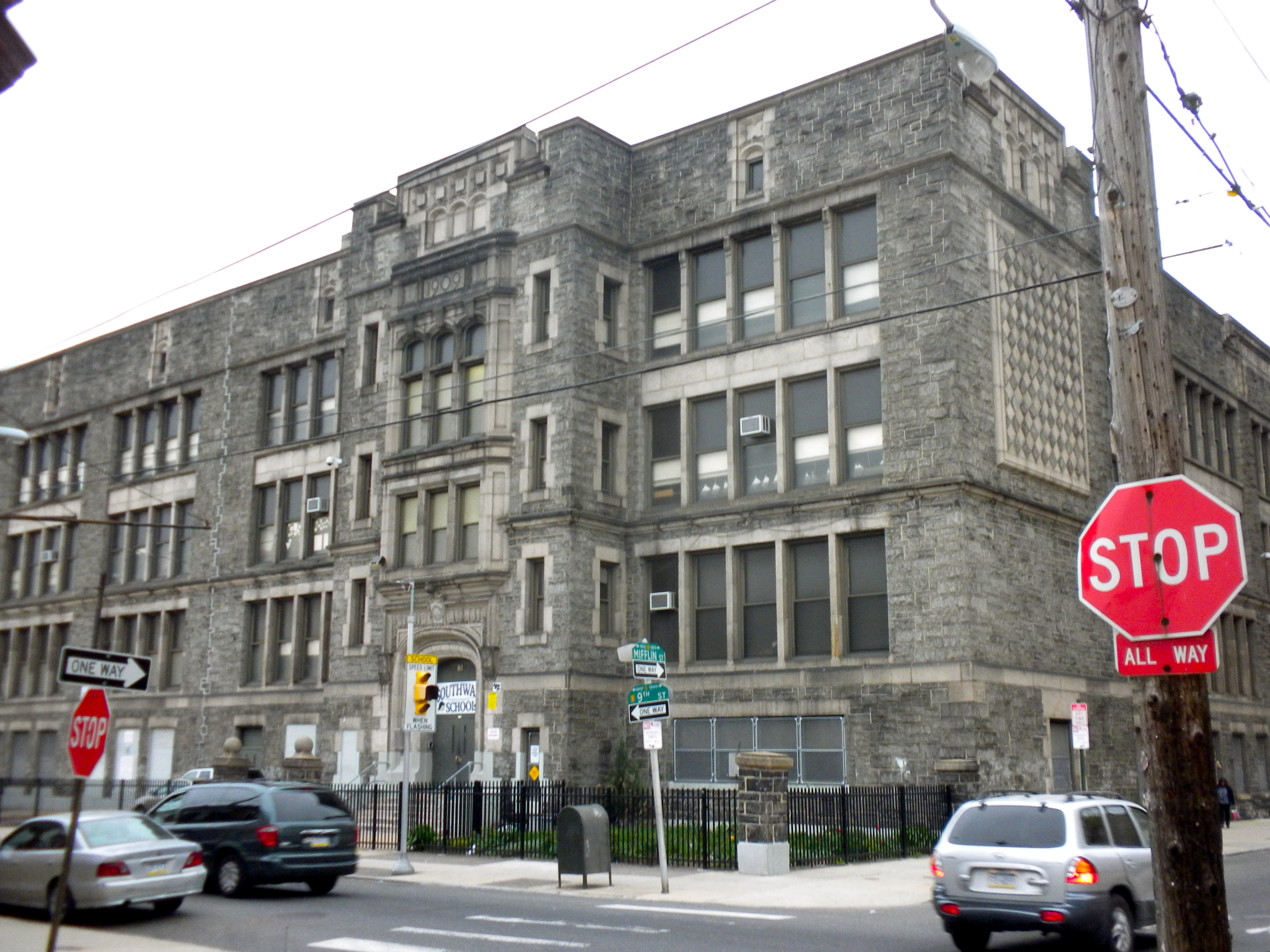
Southwark School

== See also ==
- Queen Village, Philadelphia
- Fabric Row (Philadelphia)

== Related reading ==
- Johnson, Amandus (1927) The Swedes on the Delaware (International Printing Company, Philadelphia)
- Weslager, C. A. (1988) New Sweden on the Delaware 1638-1655 (The Middle Atlantic Press, Wilmington ) ISBN 0-912608-65-X
