= 1810 United States census =

Third US census

- August 6, 1810
- Seal of the United States Marshals Service, which administered the census

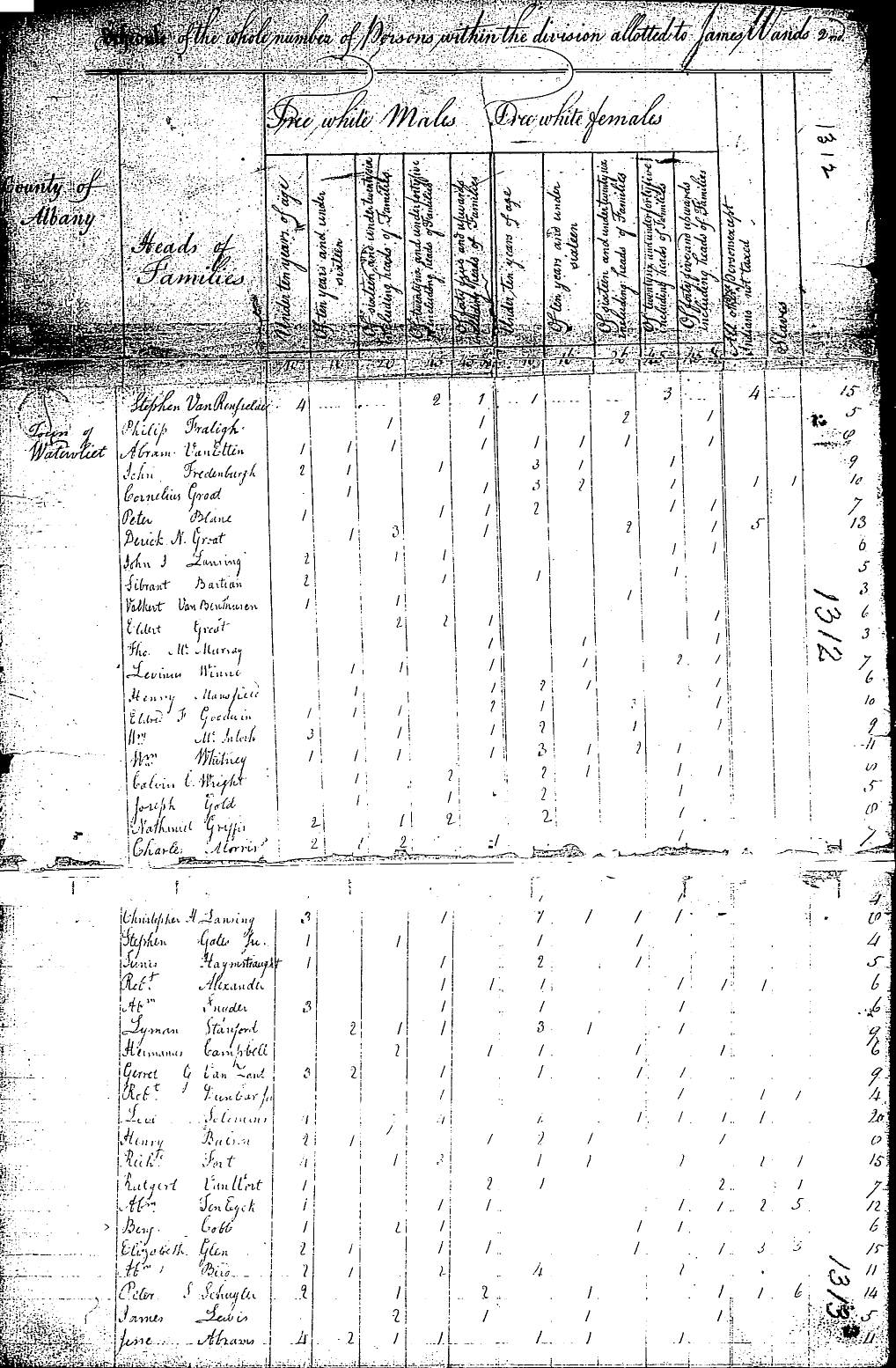
- A page of the 1810 United States census

General information
- Country: United States
- Authority: Office of the United States Marshal

Results
- Total population: 7,239,881 (▲36.4%)
- Most populous state: Virginia; 983,152
- Least populous state: Delaware; 72,674

The 1810 United States census was the third census conducted in the United States. It was conducted on August 6, 1810. It showed that 7,239,881 people were living in the United States, of whom 1,191,362 were slaves.

The 1810 census included one new state: Ohio. The original census returns for the District of Columbia, Georgia, Mississippi, New Jersey, and Ohio were lost or destroyed over the years. Most of Tennessee's original forms were also lost, other than Grainger and Rutherford counties.

This was the last census with Virginia ranked as the most populous state.

== Census questions ==
The 1810 census form contained the following information (identical to the 1800 census):

1. City or township
2. Name of the head of family
3. Number of free white males under age 10
4. Number of free white males age 10 to under 16
5. Number of free white males age 16 to under 26
6. Number of free white males age 26 to under 45
7. Number of free white males age 45 and over
8. Number of free white females under age 10
9. Number of free white females age 10 to under 16
10. Number of free white females age 16 to under 26
11. Number of free white females age 26 to under 45
12. Number of free white females age 45 and over
13. Number of all other free persons
14. Number of slaves

== Note to researchers ==
Census taking was not yet an exact science. Before 1830, enumerators lacked pre-printed forms, and some drew up their own, resulting in pages without headings. Some enumerators did not tally their results. As a result, census records for many towns before 1830 are idiosyncratic. This is not to suggest that they are less reliable than subsequent censuses, but that they may require more work on the part of the researcher.

== Data availability ==
No microdata from the 1810 population census are available, but aggregate data for small areas, together with compatible cartographic boundary files, can be downloaded from the National Historical Geographic Information System.

== State rankings ==
| Rank | State | Population |
|---|---|---|
| 01 | Virginia | 983,152 |
| 02 | New York | 959,049 |
| 03 | Pennsylvania | 810,091 |
| 04 | Massachusetts | 700,745 |
| 05 | North Carolina | 556,526 |
| 06 | South Carolina | 415,115 |
| 07 | Kentucky | 406,511 |
| 08 | Maryland | 380,546 |
| 09 | Connecticut | 262,042 |
| 10 | Tennessee | 261,727 |
| 11 | Georgia | 251,407 |
| 12 | New Jersey | 245,555 |
| 13 | Ohio | 230,760 |
| — | Maine | 228,705 |
| 14 | Vermont | 217,713 |
| 15 | New Hampshire | 214,360 |
| – | West Virginia | 105,469 |
| 16 | Rhode Island | 76,931 |
| — | Louisiana | 76,556 |
| 17 | Delaware | 72,674 |
| — | Mississippi | 31,306 |
| — | Indiana | 24,520 |
| — | Missouri | 19,783 |
| — | District of Columbia | 15,471 |
| — | Illinois | 12,282 |
| — | Alabama | 9,046 |
| — | Michigan | 4,762 |
| — | Arkansas | 1,062 |

== City rankings ==
| Rank | City | State | Population | Region (2016) |
|---|---|---|---|---|
| 01 | New York | New York | 96,373 | Northeast |
| 02 | Philadelphia | Pennsylvania | 53,722 | Northeast |
| 03 | Baltimore | Maryland | 46,555 | South |
| 04 | Boston | Massachusetts | 33,787 | Northeast |
| 05 | Charleston | South Carolina | 24,711 | South |
| 06 | Northern Liberties | Pennsylvania | 19,874 | Northeast |
| 07 | New Orleans | Territory of Orleans | 17,242 | South |
| 08 | Southwark | Pennsylvania | 13,707 | Northeast |
| 09 | Salem | Massachusetts | 12,613 | Northeast |
| 10 | Albany | New York | 10,762 | Northeast |
| 11 | Providence | Rhode Island | 10,071 | Northeast |
| 12 | Richmond | Virginia | 9,735 | South |
| 13 | Norfolk | Virginia | 9,193 | South |
| 14 | Washington | District of Columbia | 8,208 | South |
| 15 | Newark | New Jersey | 8,008 | Northeast |
| 16 | Newport | Rhode Island | 7,907 | Northeast |
| 17 | Newburyport | Massachusetts | 7,634 | Northeast |
| 18 | Alexandria | District of Columbia | 7,227 | South |
| 19 | Portland | Massachusetts | 7,169 | Northeast |
| 20 | Portsmouth | New Hampshire | 6,934 | Northeast |
| 21 | Nantucket | Massachusetts | 6,807 | Northeast |
| 22 | Gloucester | Massachusetts | 5,943 | Northeast |
| 23 | Schenectady | New York | 5,903 | Northeast |
| 24 | Marblehead | Massachusetts | 5,900 | Northeast |
| 25 | New Haven | Connecticut | 5,772 | Northeast |
| 26 | Petersburg | Virginia | 5,668 | South |
| 27 | New Bedford | Massachusetts | 5,651 | Northeast |
| 28 | Lancaster | Pennsylvania | 5,405 | Northeast |
| 29 | Savannah | Georgia | 5,215 | South |
| 30 | Charlestown | Massachusetts | 4,959 | Northeast |
| 31 | Georgetown | District of Columbia | 4,948 | South |
| 32 | Pittsburgh | Pennsylvania | 4,768 | Northeast |
| 33 | Beverly | Massachusetts | 4,608 | Northeast |
| 34 | Groton | Connecticut | 4,451 | Northeast |
| 35 | Brooklyn | New York | 4,402 | Northeast |
| 36 | Middleborough | Massachusetts | 4,400 | Northeast |
| 37 | Gilmanton | New Hampshire | 4,338 | Northeast |
| 38 | Lexington | Kentucky | 4,326 | South |
| 39 | Woodbridge | New Jersey | 4,247 | Northeast |
| 40 | Plymouth | Massachusetts | 4,228 | Northeast |
| 41 | Lynn | Massachusetts | 4,087 | Northeast |
| 42 | Hudson | New York | 4,048 | Northeast |
| 43 | Hartford | Connecticut | 3,955 | Northeast |
| 44 | Taunton | Massachusetts | 3,907 | Northeast |
| 45 | Middletown | New Jersey | 3,849 | Northeast |
| 46 | Smithfield | Rhode Island | 3,828 | Northeast |
| 47 | Danbury | Connecticut | 3,606 | Northeast |
| 48 | South Kingstown | Rhode Island | 3,560 | Northeast |
| 49 | Greenwich | Connecticut | 3,533 | Northeast |
| 50 | Reading | Pennsylvania | 3,462 | Northeast |
| 51 | Evesham | New Jersey | 3,445 | Northeast |
| 52 | New London | Connecticut | 3,238 | Northeast |
| 53 | Andover | Massachusetts | 3,164 | Northeast |
| 54 | South Amboy | New Jersey | 3,071 | Northeast |
| 55 | Trenton | New Jersey | 3,002 | Northeast |
| 56 | Norwalk | Connecticut | 2,983 | Northeast |
| 57 | Elizabeth | New Jersey | 2,977 | Northeast |
| 58 | Norwich | Connecticut | 2,976 | Northeast |
| 59 | North Kingstown | Rhode Island | 2,957 | Northeast |
| 60 | Coventry | Rhode Island | 2,928 | Northeast |
| 61 | York | Pennsylvania | 2,847 | Northeast |
| 62 | Hackensack | New Jersey | 2,835 | Northeast |
| 63 | Berlin | Connecticut | 2,798 | Northeast |
| 64 | Springfield | Massachusetts | 2,767 | Northeast |
| 65 | Londonderry | New Hampshire | 2,766 | Northeast |
| 66 | Farmington | Connecticut | 2,748 | Northeast |
| 67 | Bristol | Rhode Island | 2,698 | Northeast |
| 68 | Haverhill | Massachusetts | 2,682 | Northeast |
| 69 | Pittsfield | Massachusetts | 2,665 | Northeast |
| 70 | Worcester | Massachusetts | 2,577 | Northeast |
| 71 | Cincinnati | Ohio | 2,540 | Midwest |

== Images ==
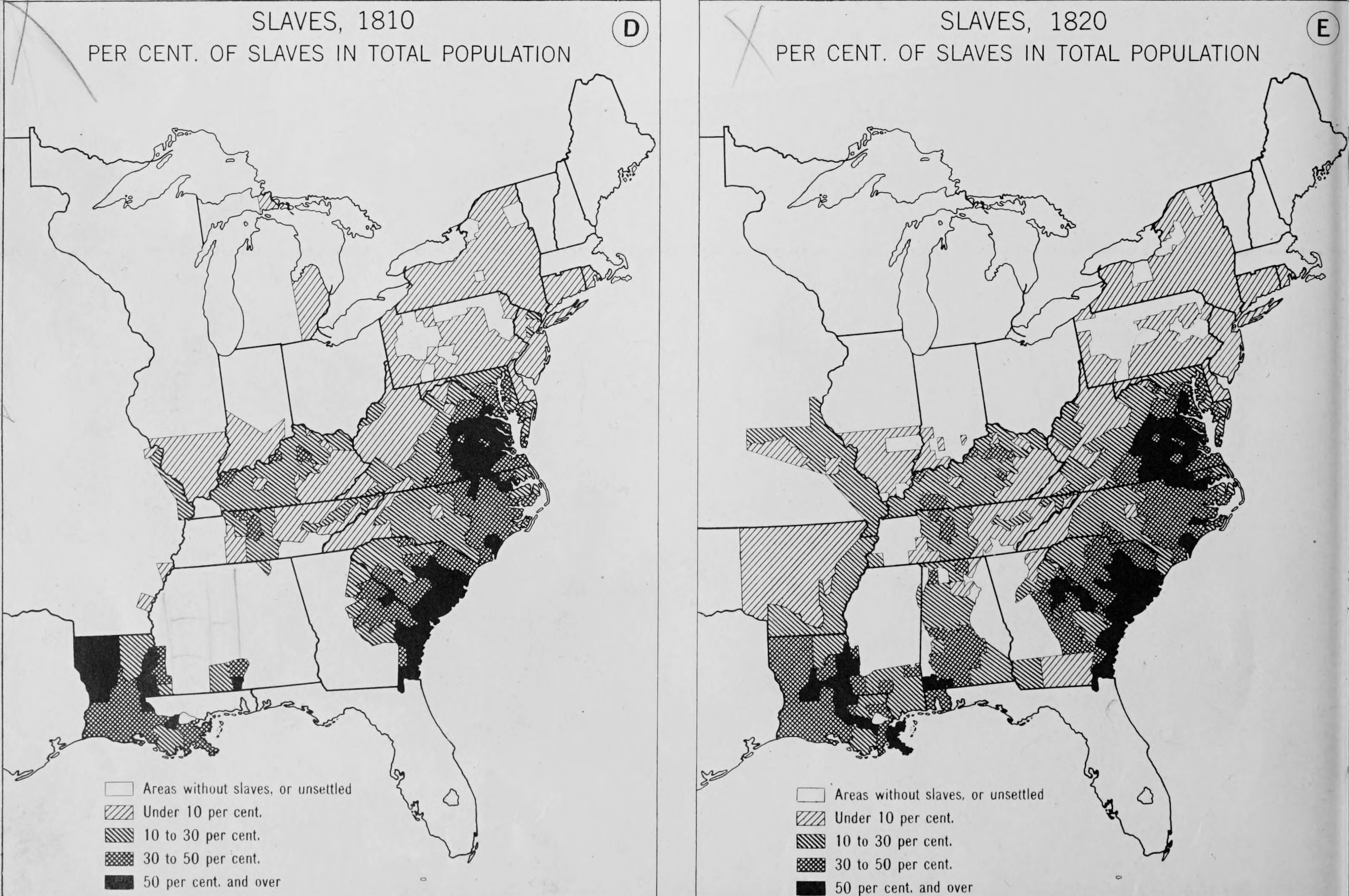
Slaves as a percentage of the total population in 1810 and 1820.
