= 1830 United States census =

Fifth US census

- June 1, 1830
- Seal of the United States Marshals Service, which administered the census

General information
- Country: United States
- Authority: Office of the United States Marshal

Results
- Total population: 12,866,020 (▲33.5%)
- Most populous state: New York; 1,918,608
- Least populous state: Delaware; 76,748

The 1830 United States census, the fifth census undertaken in the United States, was conducted on June 1, 1830. The only loss of census records for 1830 involved some countywide losses in Massachusetts, Maryland, and Mississippi.

It determined the population of the 24 states to be 12,866,020, of which 2,009,043 were slaves. The center of population was about 170 miles (274 km) west of Washington, D.C. in present-day Grant County, West Virginia.

This was the first census in which a city—New York—recorded a population of over 200,000.

== Census questions ==
The 1830 census asked these questions:

- Name of head of family
- Address
- Number of free white males and females
  - in five-year age groups to age 20
  - in 10-year age groups from 20 to 100
  - 100 years and older
- number of slaves and free colored persons in six age groups
- number of deaf and dumb
  - under 14 years old
  - 14 to 24 years old
  - 25 years and older
- number of blind
- foreigners not naturalized

== Data availability ==
No microdata from the 1830 population census are available, but aggregate data for small areas, together with compatible cartographic boundary files, can be downloaded from the National Historical Geographic Information System.

== State rankings ==
Rank	State	Population
01	New York	1,918,608
02	Pennsylvania	1,348,233
03	Virginia	1,220,978
04	Ohio	937,903
05	North Carolina	737,987
06	Kentucky	687,917
07	Tennessee	681,904
08	Massachusetts	610,408
09	South Carolina	581,185
10	Georgia	516,823
11	Maryland	447,040
12	Maine	399,455
13	Indiana	343,031
14	New Jersey	320,823
15	Alabama	309,527
16	Connecticut	297,675
17	Vermont	280,652
18	New Hampshire	269,328
19	Louisiana	215,739
X	West Virginia	176,924
20	Illinois	157,445
21	Missouri	140,455
22	Mississippi	136,621
23	Rhode Island	97,199
24	Delaware	76,748
X	Florida	34,730
X	Arkansas	30,388
X	District of Columbia	30,261
X	Michigan	28,004
X	Wisconsin	3,635

Apportionment Populations

In the U.S. Constitution, Article 1, Section 2, Clause 3 states:

Representatives and direct Taxes shall be apportioned among the several States which may be included within this Union, according to their respective Numbers, which shall be determined by adding to the whole Number of free Persons, including those bound to Service for a Term of Years, and excluding Indians not taxed, three fifths of all other Persons.

In order to correctly apportion Representatives pursuant to this Census, it was necessary for the Census to compute not only the total population of each state, but the number of free persons and slaves, and then to compute the apportionment population, or Federal number, for each state (and territory) by adding three-fifths of the slave population to the free population. (This was computed by county, so the totals for each state may be off by as many as 1.2 persons due to rounding.)

State	Total	Free	Slave	Federal
Maine	399437	399431	6	399434
New Hampshire	269328	269323	5	269326
Massachusetts	610408	610404	4	610406
Rhode Island	97199	97185	14	97193
Connecticut	297675	297650	25	297665
Vermont	280657	280657		280657
New York	1918608	1918532	76	1918577
New Jersey	320823	318569	2254	319922
Pennsylvania	1348233	1347830	403	1348072
Delaware	76748	73456	3292	75431
Maryland	447040	344046	102994	405842
Virginia	1211405	741648	469757	1023502
North Carolina	737987	492386	245601	639747
South Carolina	581185	265784	315401	455025
Georgia	516823	299292	217531	429810
Kentucky	687917	522704	165213	621832
Tennessee	681903	540300	141603	625263
Ohio	935884	935878	6	935882
Louisiana	215739	106151	109588	171904
Indiana	343031	343028	3	343030
Mississippi	136621	70962	65659	110358
Illinois	157445	156698	747	157147
Alabama	309527	191978	117549	262508
Missouri	140455	115364	25091	130419
Territory of Michigan	31639	31607	32	31625
Territory of Arkansas	30388	25812	4576	28557
Territory of Florida	34730	19229	15501	28529
District of Columbia	39834	33715	6119	37389

== City rankings ==
Rank	City	State	Population	Region (2016)
01	New York	New York	202,589	Northeast
02	Baltimore	Maryland	80,620	South
03	Philadelphia	Pennsylvania	80,462	Northeast
04	Boston	Massachusetts	61,392	Northeast
05	New Orleans	Louisiana	46,082	South
06	Charleston	South Carolina	30,289	South
07	Northern Liberties	Pennsylvania	28,872	Northeast
08	Cincinnati	Ohio	24,831	Midwest
09	Albany	New York	24,209	Northeast
10	Southwark	Pennsylvania	20,581	Northeast
11	Washington	District of Columbia	18,826	South
12	Providence	Rhode Island	16,833	Northeast
13	Richmond	Virginia	16,060	South
14	Salem	Massachusetts	13,895	Northeast
15	Kensington	Pennsylvania	13,394	Northeast
16	Portland	Maine	12,598	Northeast
17	Pittsburgh	Pennsylvania	12,568	Northeast
18	Brooklyn	New York	12,406	Northeast
19	Troy	New York	11,556	Northeast
20	Spring Garden	Pennsylvania	11,140	Northeast
21	Newark	New Jersey	10,953	Northeast
22	Louisville	Kentucky	10,341	South
23	New Haven	Connecticut	10,180	Northeast
24	Norfolk	Virginia	9,814	South
25	Rochester	New York	9,207	Northeast
26	Charlestown	Massachusetts	8,783	Northeast
27	Buffalo	New York	8,668	Northeast
28	Georgetown	District of Columbia	8,441	South
29	Utica	New York	8,323	Northeast
30	Petersburg	Virginia	8,322	South
31	Alexandria	District of Columbia	8,241	South
32	Portsmouth	New Hampshire	8,026	Northeast
33	Newport	Rhode Island	8,010	Northeast
34	Lancaster	Pennsylvania	7,704	Northeast
35	New Bedford	Massachusetts	7,592	Northeast
36	Gloucester	Massachusetts	7,510	Northeast
37	Savannah	Georgia	7,303	South
38	Nantucket	Massachusetts	7,202	Northeast
39	Hartford	Connecticut	7,074	Northeast
40	Smithfield	Rhode Island	6,857	Northeast
41	Moyamensing	Pennsylvania	6,822	Northeast
42	Springfield	Massachusetts	6,784	Northeast
43	Augusta	Georgia	6,710	South
44	Wilmington	Delaware	6,628	South
45	Lowell	Massachusetts	6,474	Northeast
46	Newburyport	Massachusetts	6,375	Northeast
47	Lynn	Massachusetts	6,138	Northeast
48	Cambridge	Massachusetts	6,072	Northeast
49	Taunton	Massachusetts	6,042	Northeast
50	Lexington	Kentucky	6,026	South
51	Reading	Pennsylvania	5,856	Northeast
52	Nashville	Tennessee	5,566	South
53	Warwick	Rhode Island	5,529	Northeast
54	Dover	New Hampshire	5,449	Northeast
55	Hudson	New York	5,392	Northeast
56	Roxbury	Massachusetts	5,247	Northeast
57	Marblehead	Massachusetts	5,149	Northeast
58	Middletown	New Jersey	5,128	Northeast
59	Middleborough	Massachusetts	5,008	Northeast
60	St. Louis	Missouri	4,977	Midwest
61	Groton	Connecticut	4,805	Northeast
62	Plymouth	Massachusetts	4,758	Northeast
63	Lynchburg	Virginia	4,630	South
64	Andover	Massachusetts	4,530	Northeast
65	Auburn	New York	4,486	Northeast
66	Frederick	Maryland	4,427	South
67	New London	Connecticut	4,335	Northeast
68	Harrisburg	Pennsylvania	4,312	Northeast
69	Danbury	Connecticut	4,311	Northeast
70	Schenectady	New York	4,268	Northeast
71	Evesham	New Jersey	4,239	Northeast
72	Danvers	Massachusetts	4,228	Northeast
73	York	Pennsylvania	4,216	Northeast
74	Worcester	Massachusetts	4,173	Northeast
75	Fall River	Massachusetts	4,158	Northeast
76	Dorchester	Massachusetts	4,074	Northeast
77	Beverly	Massachusetts	4,073	Northeast
78	Norwalk	Connecticut	3,972	Northeast
79	Woodbridge	New Jersey	3,969	Northeast
80	Trenton	New Jersey	3,925	Northeast
81	Haverhill	Massachusetts	3,896	Northeast
82	Orange	New Jersey	3,887	Northeast
83	Coventry	Rhode Island	3,851	Northeast
84	Gilmanton	New Hampshire	3,816	Northeast
85	Greenwich	Connecticut	3,801	Northeast
86	New Bern	North Carolina	3,796	South
87	Wilmington	North Carolina	3,791	South
88	South Amboy	New Jersey	3,782	Northeast
89	Concord	New Hampshire	3,720	Northeast
90	Carlisle	Pennsylvania	3,707	Northeast
91	Cumberland	Rhode Island	3,675	Northeast
92	South Kingstown	Rhode Island	3,663	Northeast
93	Pittsfield	Massachusetts	3,559	Northeast
94	Easton	Pennsylvania	3,529	Northeast
95	Burlington	Vermont	3,526	Northeast
96	North Providence	Rhode Island	3,503	Northeast
97	Elizabeth	New Jersey	3,455	Northeast
98	Saddle Brook	New Jersey	3,399	Northeast
99	Hagerstown	Maryland	3,371	South
100	Franklin, Somerset County	New Jersey	3,352	Northeast

== Images ==
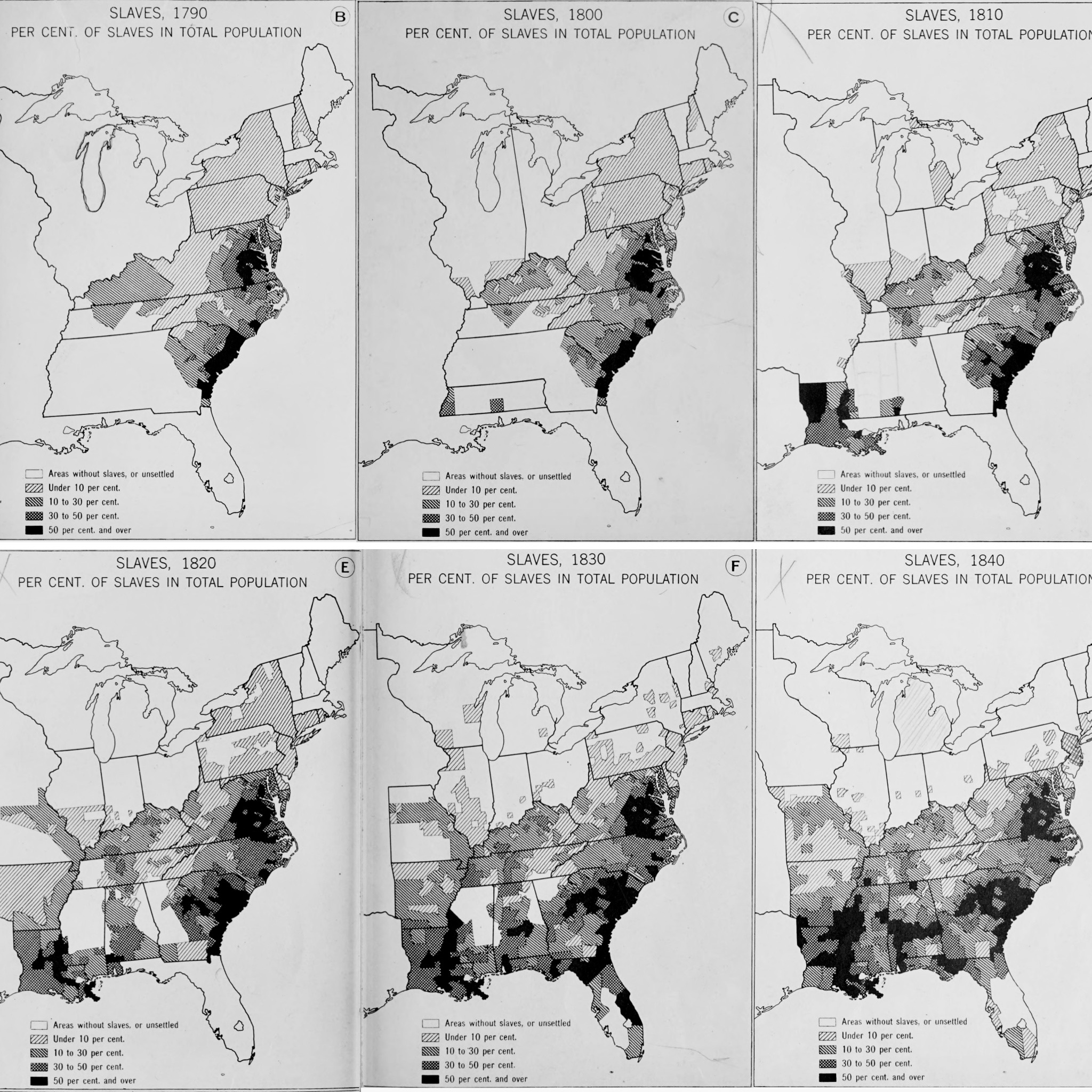
Slaves as a percentage of the total population from 1790 to 1840 (including for 1830).
