= Pennsport, Philadelphia =

Pennsport
- Neighborhood of Philadelphia
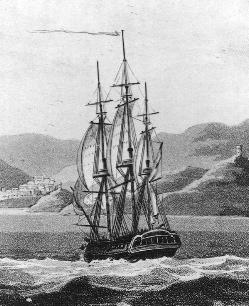
- Drawing of the USS Philadelphia, built in Joshua Humphreys' shipyard in Pennsport, 1799.

- Location within Philadelphia
- Country: United States
- State: Pennsylvania
- County: Philadelphia
- City: Philadelphia
- ZIP Code: 19147, 19148
- Area codes: Area codes 215, 267, and 445

Pennsport is a neighborhood in the South Philadelphia section of Philadelphia, Pennsylvania, United States.

Pennsport is home to a large working-class Irish American population, many of them descendants of immigrants from the mid to late 19th century. They maintain social organizations (also called "clubs"), which are located along 2nd Street (known locally as "Two Street"). Each year the clubs spend months preparing costumes, music and performances for Philadelphia's annual Mummers Parade on Broad Street on New Year's Day.

At one time, Pennsport was proposed as a location for development of casinos along the Philadelphia waterfront. Many residents opposed this, as they wanted development that would provide better jobs. The state and city had conducted some negotiations with the Mashantucket Pequot, whose reservation is based in Connecticut, to establish Foxwoods Casino Philadelphia in this neighborhood, but the proposal never gained approval.

== Location ==
Pennsport is bounded by the Delaware River to the east, the Queen Village neighborhood to the north, Whitman to the south, and Dickinson Square West to the west. The Pennsport Redevelopment Area Plan of 1968 listed the border streets as Washington Avenue on the north, Snyder Avenue on the south, and Fourth Street on the west.

== Demographics ==
The 2000 census listed Pennsport's population as 26,300, but this figure includes the populations of Southwark, Queen Village, and Whitman neighborhoods.

Pennsport's population identifies as 70% white, 17% African American, 8% Asian American, and 5% Hispanic and Latino American, of any race. Roughly 40% of the population is under 18.

== History ==
"The building of the Frigate Philadelphia", Plate 29 of Birch's Views of Philadelphia (1800). The man standing in the foreground may be a portrait of Humphreys

According to the Genealogy of Philadelphia County Subdivisions, Pennsport was originally part of Moyamensing Township. Most of the area north of present-day Mifflin Street was included in the Southwark District from 1794 until the consolidation of Philadelphia in 1854. At that point, it was mostly contained in the First Ward. The First and Second wards ran east of Passyunk Avenue and were divided by Wharton Street (First to the south, Second to the north). The southern boundary of the First Ward initially spanned south to the river, but it was stopped at Mifflin Street in 1898.

The Washington Avenue Immigration Station was an immigrant processing facility located at the end of Washington Avenue at Pier 53 on the Delaware River. It operated from 1873 to 1915.

During King George's War in 1748, a young Benjamin Franklin erected the "Association Battery" or "Grand Battery" here along the river. These were earthwork defenses fitted with artillery.

The first United States naval yard started in the 1770s as a private commercial yard located in what is now Pennsport at Federal Street on the Delaware River. It was owned and operated by noted shipbuilder Joshua Humphreys. He designed the original six frigates of the United States Navy. In addition, the frigate USS Philadelphia, not one of those six, was also built at what became the official navy yard.

The naval yard was designated for the US Navy in 1801 and was active until 1875. That year it was relocated to new facilities built on League Island. The shipyard expanded to support production and repair of ships. During World War II, some 40,000 people worked here in shifts that operated 24 hours a day.

The shipyard was closed in 1991, as a result of a decision by the Base Realignment and Closure Commission. Nearly 1000 acres was transferred to the City of Philadelphia for redevelopment. What is known as The Navy Yard has been developed for businesses and manufacturing. A part of the site is still devoted to shipbuilding.

The neighborhood has other buildings and structures of historic interest. Furness High School and the former Abigail Vare School are listed on the National Register of Historic Places. The Historic rowhouse synagogue, Congregation Shivtei Yeshuron-Ezras Israel, was featured in the Hidden City Philadelphia 2013 Festival.

== Education ==
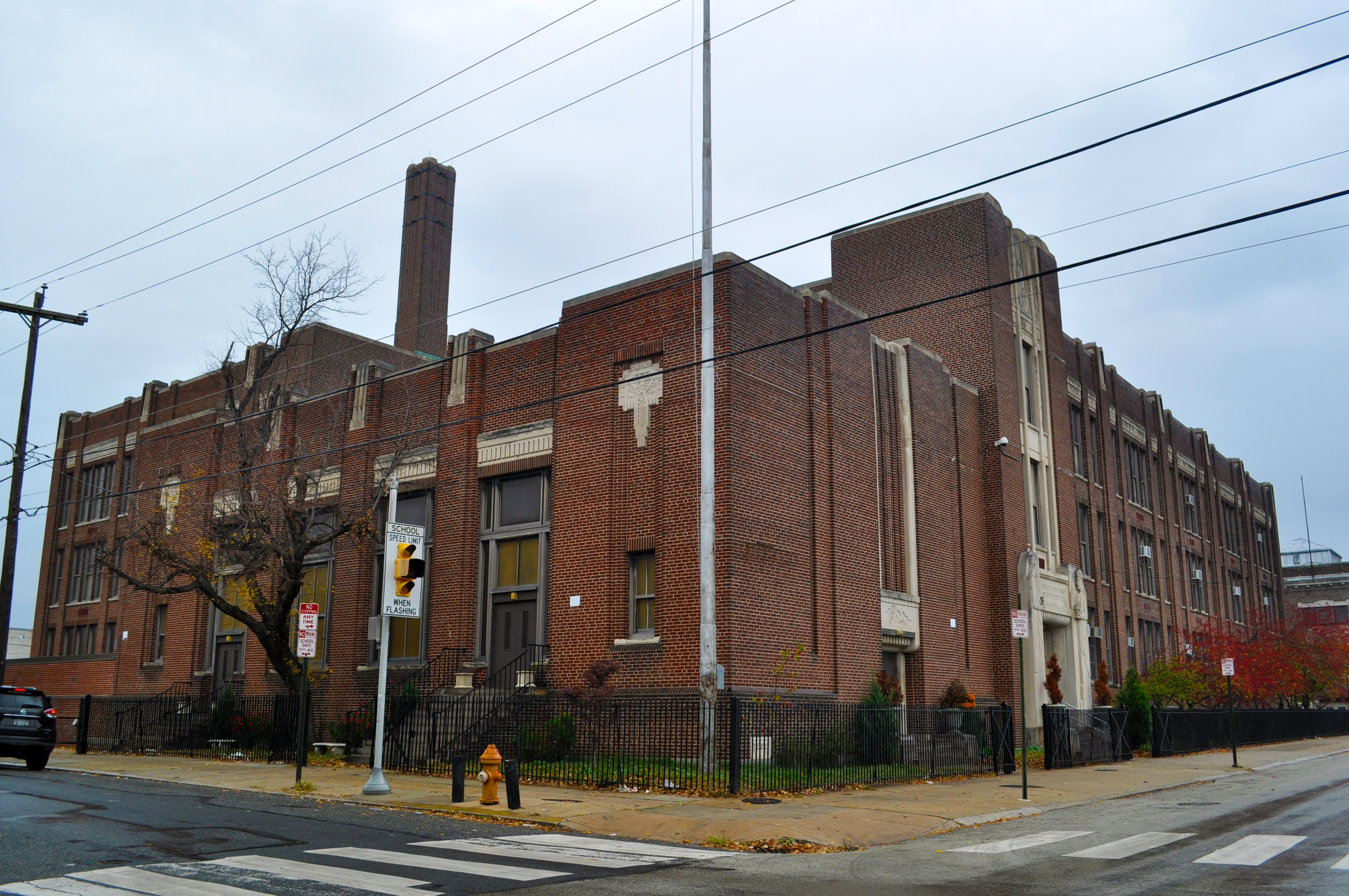
The Vare-Washington School, in the former Washington School in Dickinson Square West, serves Pennsport.

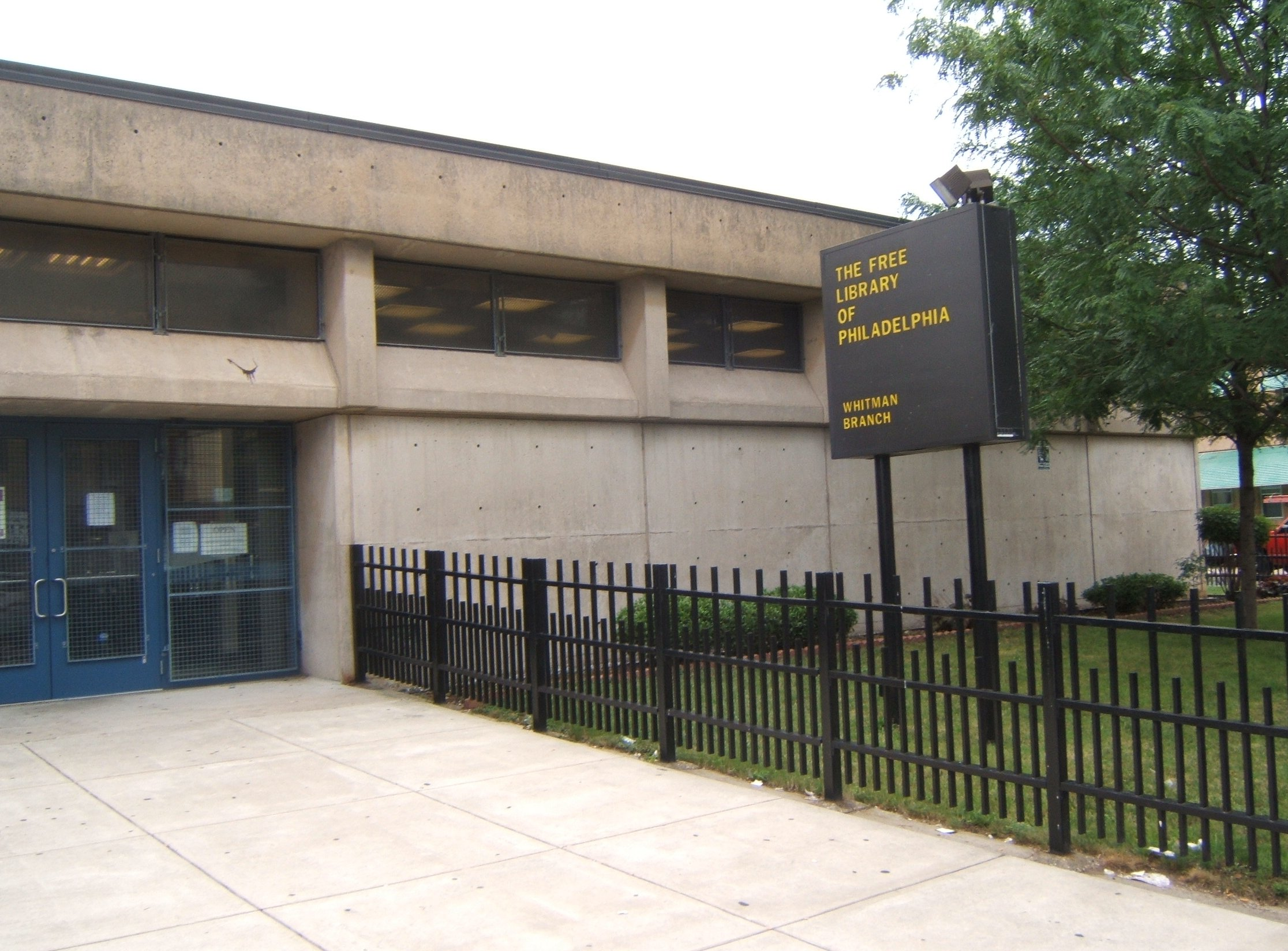
Whitman Branch of the Free Library of Philadelphia

The School District of Philadelphia operates public schools serving Pennsport.

Vare-Washington School serves grades K-8. The school was previously named Abigail Vare School and had occupied a building in Pennsport. In October 2013 the Philadelphia School Reform Commission (SRC) voted to close Washington School in Dickinson Square West. Abigail Vare School moved from its previous building to the former Washington building at 1198 South 5th Street.

Furness High School also serves area residents.

=== Public libraries ===
The Free Library of Philadelphia Whitman Branch in Whitman serves Pennsport.

== Notable people ==
- Rob McElhenney – actor, creator of It's Always Sunny in Philadelphia
- Edward "Babe" Heffron - A paratrooper in Company E, 506th Parachute Infantry Regiment, 101st Airborne Division, Heffron took part in the Battle of the Bulge in Belgium and helped liberate the Kaufering concentration camp in Landsberg, Germany. He received a Bronze Star and Purple Heart.
- William "Wild Bill" Guarnere (April 28, 1923 – March 8, 2014) - a United States Army soldier who fought in World War II as an NCO with Easy Company, 2nd Battalion, 506th Parachute Infantry Regiment, in the U.S. Army's 101st Airborne Division. HBO produced a miniseries Band of Brothers (2001), based on Guarnere and his unit; Guarnere was portrayed by Frank John Hughes. Guarnere later wrote and published his own account: Brothers in Battle, Best of Friends: Two WWII Paratroopers from the Original Band of Brothers Tell Their Story (2007). Long-time friend Edward "Babe" Heffron and journalist Robyn Post were co-authors.

Bronze statues of William “Wild Bill” Guarnere and Edward “Babe” Heffron have been installed at a park on 2nd and Reed Streets. It portrays the pair as young men, as they looked just before leaving Pennsport to fight in Europe during World War II.

== Gallery ==
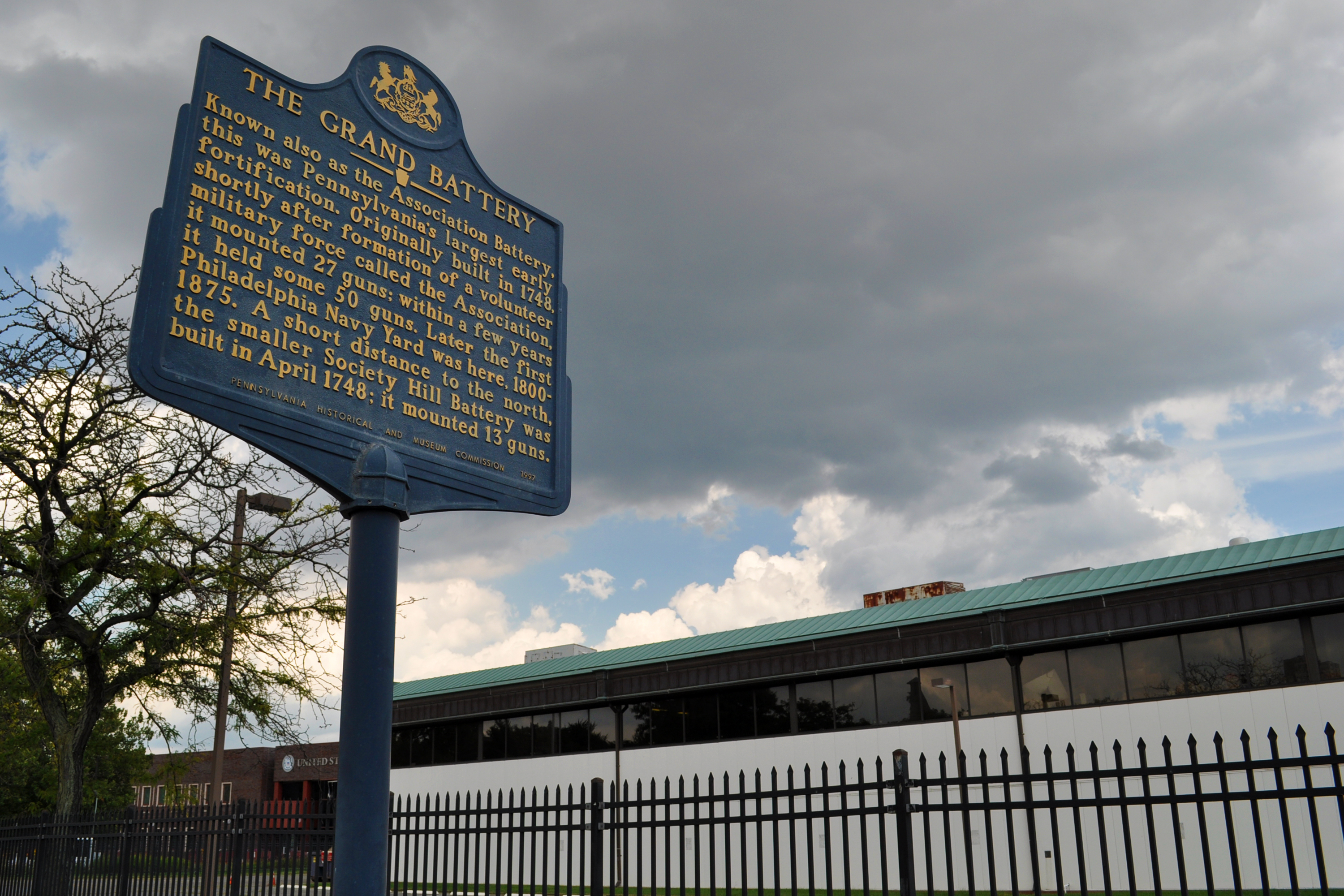
Grand Battery Historical Marker, U.S. Coast Guard Station, Philadelphia

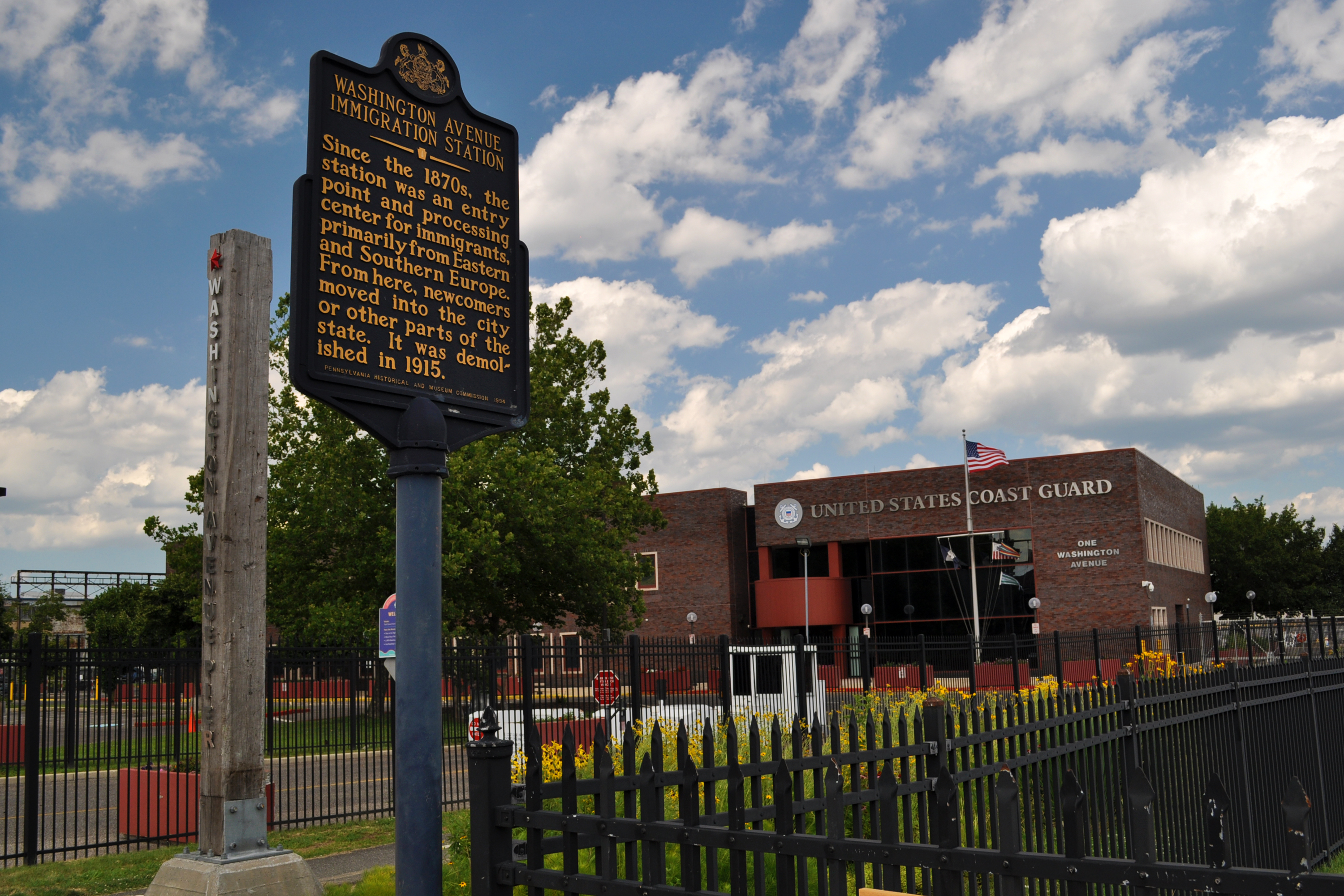
Washington Avenue Immigration Station Historical Marker, 1 Washington Avenue, Philadelphia
