= Furness High School =

- Horace Howard Furness High School
- U.S. National Register of Historic Places
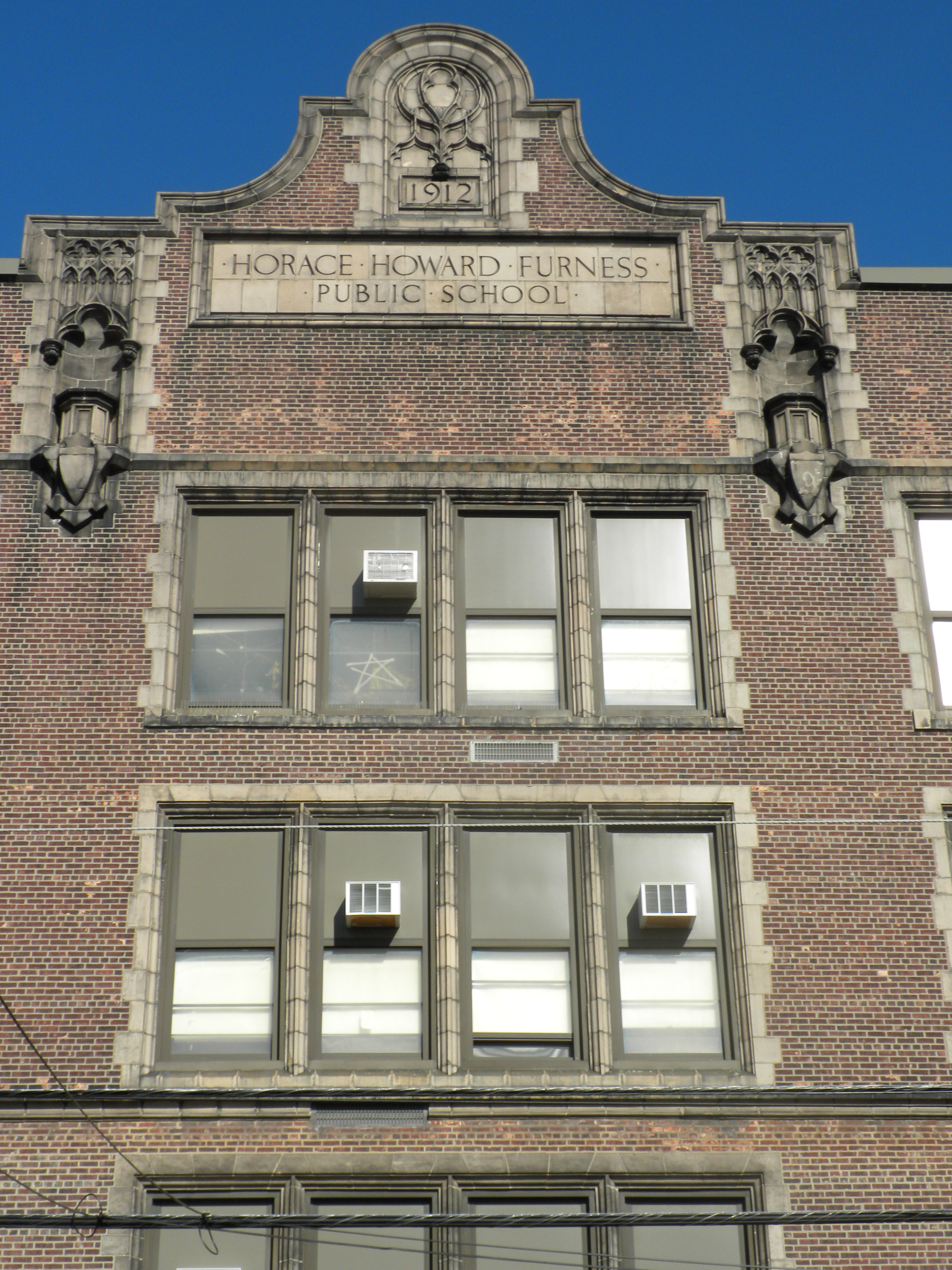
- Furness High School in May 2010

- Location within Philadelphia Location within Pennsylvania Location within the United States
- Location: 1900 S. Third St., Philadelphia, Pennsylvania 19148
- Coordinates: 39°55′26″N 75°09′03″W
- Area: 2 acres (0.81 ha)
- Built: 1914
- Built by: Cramp & Co.
- Architect: Henry deCourcy Richards
- Architectural style: Late Gothic Revival, Academic Gothic
- MPS: Philadelphia Public Schools TR
- NRHP reference No.: 86003286
- Added to NRHP: December 1, 1986

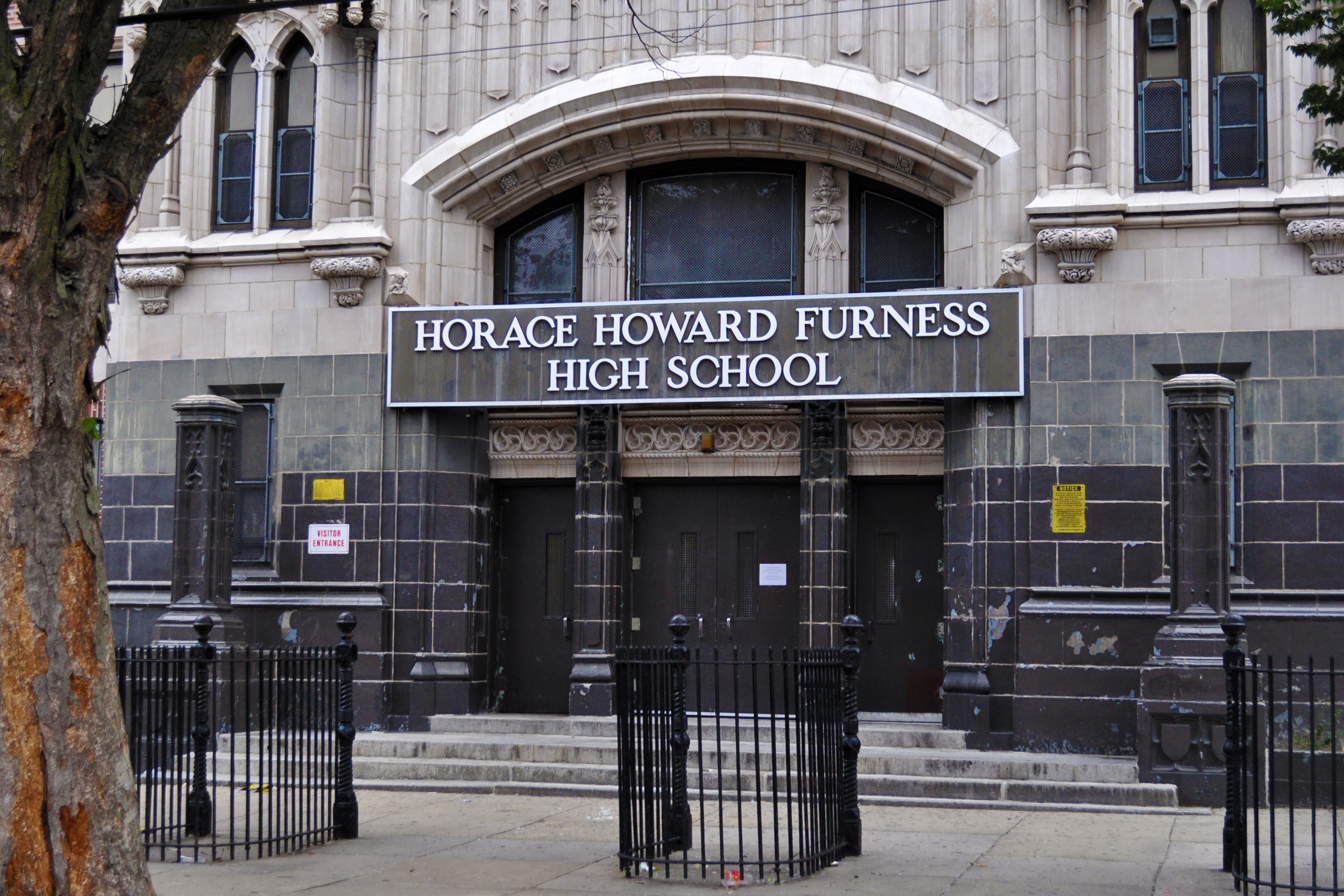

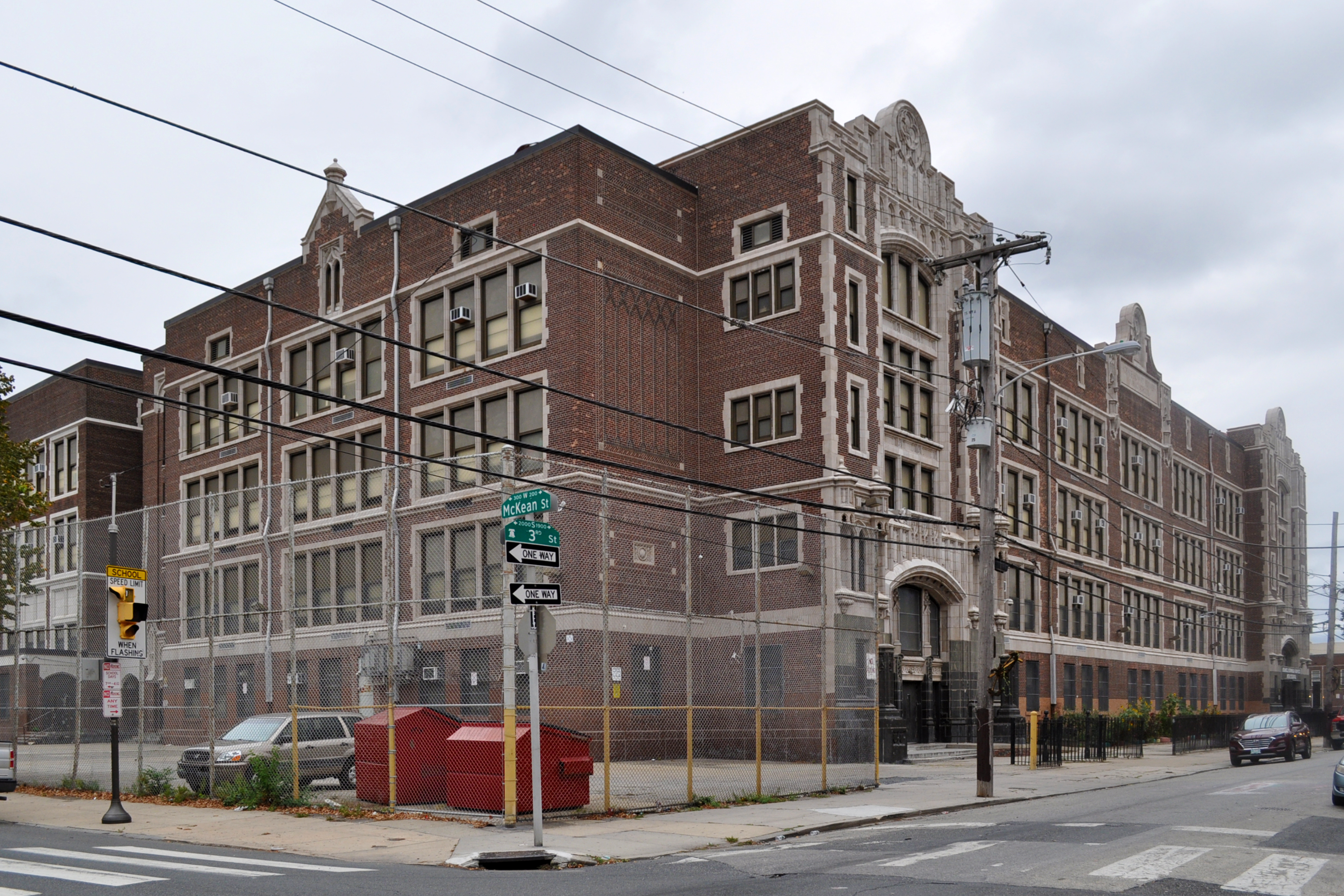

Horace Howard Furness High School is a secondary (9th-12th) school in South Philadelphia. It is part of the School District of Philadelphia.

Portions of South Philadelphia (including Bella Vista, Passyunk Square, Pennsport, Queen Village, and Whitman) are zoned to Furness. A section of Center City, including Society Hill and Old City, was formerly zoned to Furness for high school.

== History ==
It was originally built as an elementary school, with construction starting in 1913 and ending in 1914; it later became Horace Furness Junior High School. It was named for Shakespearean scholar Horace Howard Furness (1833–1912).

It was added to the National Register of Historic Places as Horace Furness Junior High School in 1986. It was later converted into a senior high school, and its first high school graduation was held in 1991.

In 2012 Daniel Peou, a Cambodian American man who was once a refugee and had lived in Philadelphia, became the principal of Furness.

== Architecture ==
The school building was designed by Henry deCourcy Richards and built by Cramp & Co. It is a four-story, rectangular, reinforced concrete building clad in brick and terra cotta in the Late Gothic Revival-style. It features an oversized arched entryway, blind panels, terra cotta quoining, and a brick parapet.

== Student body ==
As of 2015 the school had 694 students. These students used over 25 different languages.

In 2000 the school had about 1,200 students. In the 2009-2010 school year the school had 673 students, with 40% being African-American and 38% being Asian.

Benjamin Herold of the Philadelphia Public School Notebook stated that Furness was largely free of racial tensions.

== Academic performance ==
In regards to Pennsylvania's state achievement tests, of 11th graders at Furness, the percentages of students meeting the standard or higher were 43% in reading and 58% in mathematics. In terms of Philadelphia's comprehensive schools these percentages were higher than the average.

== Transportation ==
SEPTA routes 29, 57 and 79 serve Furness.

== School uniforms ==
Furness requires its students to wear school uniforms. Students may wear a gray shirt that must have a collar on it with black pants.

== Feeder patterns ==
K-8 schools feeding into Furness include:

- Fanny Jackson Coppin School (formerly Andrew Jackson School)
- Eliza Butler Kirkbride School
- William M. Meredith School
- George W. Nebinger School
- George Sharswood School
- John H. Taggart School
- Vare-Washington School (formerly Abigail Vare School and George Washington School)

Previously George A. McCall School in Society Hill fed Furness High.

== See also ==
- Horace Howard Furness
