= Tesla's Letters =

Tesla's Letters is a play by Jeffrey Stanley. This semi-autobiographical wartime drama set in the Balkans just before the Kosovo crisis premiered Off Broadway at the Ensemble Studio Theatre in 1999. The cast included Victor Slezak, Judith Roberts, Keira Naughton and Grant Varjas. The play went on to many other productions and public readings around the world.

== Plot ==
The play takes place in 1997, two years after Operation Storm and the Dayton Agreement and two years prior to the start of the Kosovo War and the US-led 1999 NATO bombing of Yugoslavia, with the scenes set at the Nikola Tesla Museum in the Serbian capital, Belgrade, on a bus at the Serbian-Croatian border, and at Tesla's birthplace in the Croatian village of Smiljan. Daisy Archer is a trendy young Ph.D. student from the US who has won a research grant to fly to Belgrade to research the life of eccentric electrical pioneer, Nikola Tesla. Tesla, who was of Serbian descent, spent 60 years of his life as a US citizen; this tri-national pedigree alone will present Daisy with semantics problems more complicated than she imagined.

On her first day in Belgrade she meets museum director Dragan and his elderly secretary Biljana. Dragan will decide whether Daisy is to be granted access to an archive of Tesla's personal letters. He begins making aggressive advances on her, and his plan seems simple: sex in exchange for the letters. But Dragan explains that he wants Daisy to go to Smiljan, which, at that point in time, is still unsettled and the scene of recent fighting, to take photographs of the house in which Tesla was born and raised, as well as of the church in which his father was a Serbian Orthodox priest. If Daisy complies, he will give her access to Tesla's letters. She agrees to strike the dangerous bargain.

On the bus to Croatia, Daisy meets Zoran, a handsome, charismatic young man and ex-Croatian soldier. Upon learning that she plans on driving to the remote region where Smiljan is located, an area which US State Department travel advisories have warned Americans to avoid, he insists on coming along as her guide. In Smiljan, Daisy witnesses the immediate aftermath of a military attack on a civilian neighborhood and sees a moment of deadly violence as it occurs. She takes photographs of Tesla's birthplace and returns to Belgrade for a final confrontation with Dragan.

In the end Daisy rejects nationalism in any form, refuses to take sides and arrives at a cynical and seemingly prophetic conclusion that the war will soon resume in the Balkans and around the world because humans, including even her hero Tesla, are savages who enjoy plotting, planning and executing destruction.
