= Abigail Vare School =

- U.S. National Register of Historic Places
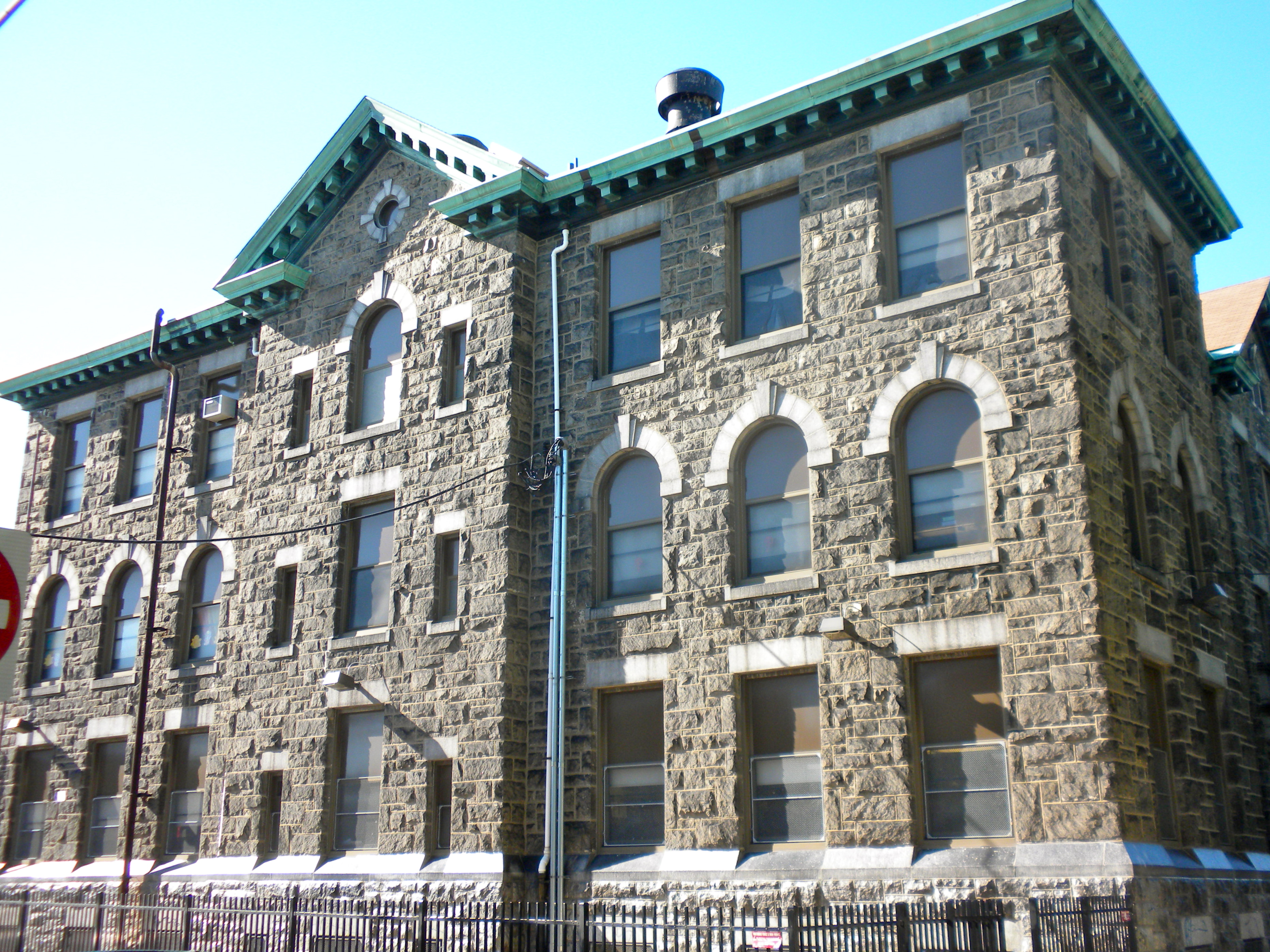
- Abigail Vare School, May 2010

- Location within Philadelphia Location within Pennsylvania Location within the United States
- Location: 1619 E. Moyamensing Ave., Philadelphia, Pennsylvania
- Coordinates: 39.9728°N 75.1507°W
- Area: 1 acre (0.40 ha)
- Built: 1903–1904
- Built by: Samuel Garley, Jr.
- Architect: James Gaw
- Architectural style: Classical Revival
- MPS: Philadelphia Public Schools TR
- NRHP reference No.: 86003339
- Added to NRHP: December 4, 1986

Abigail Vare School is a former school building located in the Pennsport neighborhood of Philadelphia, Pennsylvania. It is located across from Dickinson Square Park.

The building was added to the National Register of Historic Places in 1986.

== History ==
It was built in 1903–1904, and is a three-story, square stone building in the Classical Revival-style. It features a central projecting pediment with Ionic order columns and decorative Palladian window, an oversized molded cornice, and a hipped and gable roof with decorative brackets. The school was named after Abigail Vare, the mother of the three Vare Brothers (including William Scott Vare), who became politicians and contractors.

In December 2012 Superintendent William R. Hite Jr. presented a proposal that would close the George Washington School and move Abigail Vare School into Washington's building. At the time Washington's building was in a better condition compared to Vare's, while the Vare school had an academic performance superior to that of Washington's. In March 2013, the school district voted to close Washington. Abigail Vare School moved from its previous building to the former Washington building, and it is now known as Vare-Washington School.

After Washington-Vare moved to the former Washington school, the former Vare school remained vacant. The school district and the Philadelphia Industrial Development Corporation listed the Vare building for $2.5 million. Concordia Group, a company headquartered in Bethesda, Maryland, acquired the Vare building, along with Germantown High School and three other schools, for $6.8 million. The SRC voted on this sale in September 2014.

In 2015 Concordia Group announced that it wished to construct six townhouses next to the former Vare building and also convert Vare itself into 45 apartment units. The developer engaged in a community meeting with area residents, and it reduced the number of units to 41, in addition to reducing the amount of parking.
