= Jeffrey Stanley =

American dramatist (born 1967)

- Stanley in 2005 on a New York City Subway platform
- Born: September 3, 1967 (age 58); Roanoke, Virginia
- Education: New York University (NYU)
- Occupations: playwright, screenwriter
- Writing career
- Notable work: Tesla's Letters (1999)

Jeffrey Stanley (born September 3, 1967) is a playwright born in Roanoke, Virginia. He began writing in elementary school, and graduated from New York University Tisch School of the Arts Undergraduate Film & TV Program and Graduate Dramatic Writing Program. He was also a fellow at Yaddo, a Copeland Fellow at Amherst College, an Amtrak Residency for Writers recipient, and a Fulbright-Nehru Research Scholar to India. He remains active as a Legacy Fulbright Scholar Alumni Ambassador.

His first success came with the play Tesla's Letters (1999), a semi-autobiographical wartime drama set in the Balkans just before the Kosovo crisis, produced Off Broadway at the Ensemble Studio Theatre. The cast included Victor Slezak and Judith Roberts. The play has gone on to many other productions and public readings around the world.

That was followed by Medicine, Man (2003), a supernatural dark comedy inspired by his grandmother's death in an Appalachian hospital and his discovery that he is part Cherokee. The play was commissioned by and premiered at the Mill Mountain Theatre in Stanley's hometown and featured Janelle Schremmer (Chalk), Bev Appleton (The Answer Man) and George C. Hosmer (The Hebrew Hammer).

He also performs autobiographical comic monologues including The Golden Horseshoe: A Lecture On Tragedy, Beautiful Zion: A Book of the Dead and Jeffrey Stanley's Boneyards.

He has written and directed a number of short plays, one of which he adapted into the award-winning short film Lady in a Box, a satire loosely inspired by the Terri Schiavo case, starring Sarita Choudhury and John Lordan (The Company). He is a past president of the board of directors of the New York Neo-Futurists experimental theatre troupe.

Stanley has written articles for The Washington Post, Time Out New York, The New York Times, the New York Press, The Brooklyn Rail, Hemispheres, Contingent Magazine, peer-reviewed scholarly journals Democratic Communiqué and Race & Class, and he was a senior editorial adviser to the nonfiction book on apocalypse movements The End That Does. He has been a guest on Coast to Coast AM, and appeared in the limited streaming series Manbhanjan in India.

He teaches film and theatre courses at New York University and Drexel University, and has taught at the Lee Stasberg Theatre and Film Institute.
