= Vare-Washington School =

- George Washington School
- U.S. National Register of Historic Places
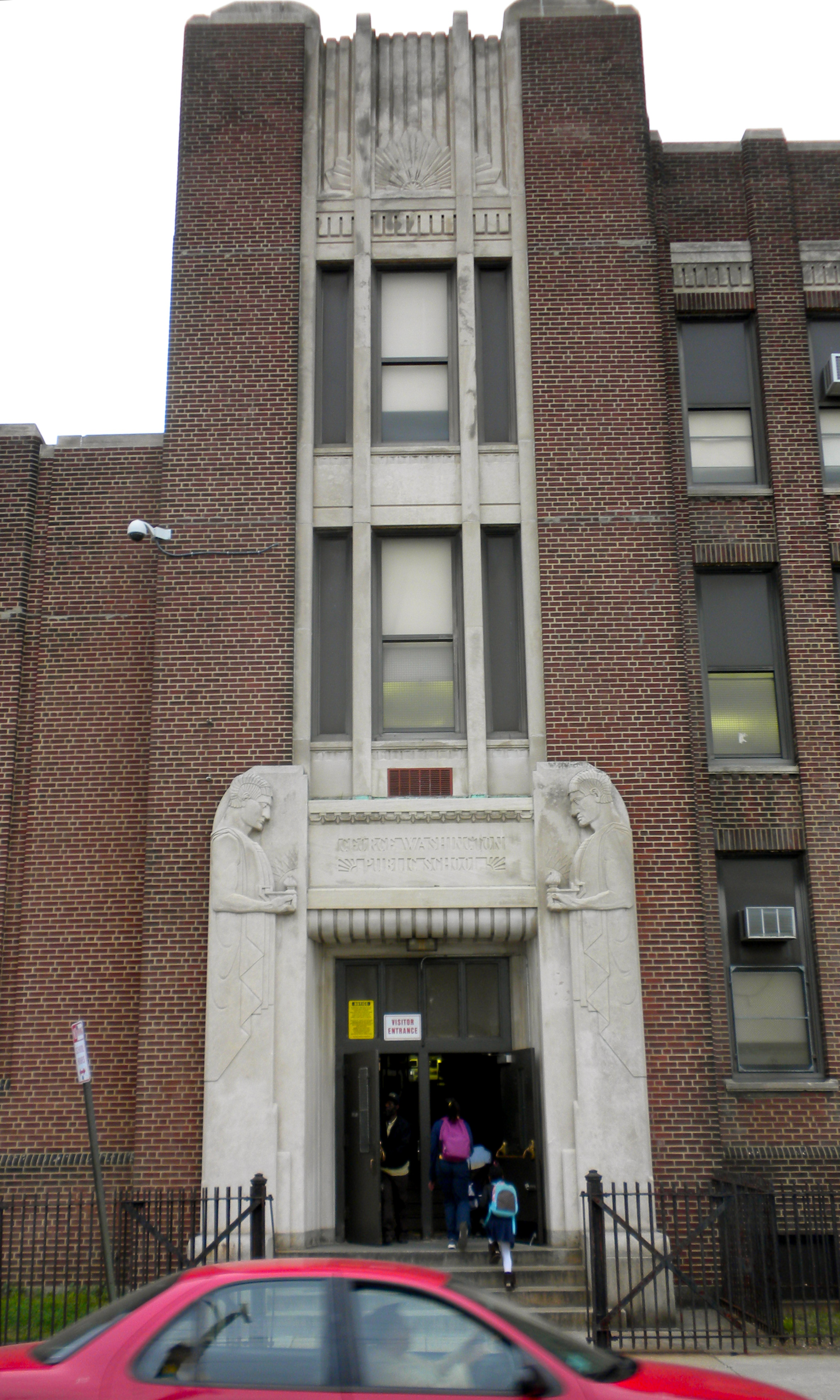
- George Washington School, April 2010

- Location within Philadelphia Location within Pennsylvania Location within the United States
- Location: 1198 S. 5th St., Philadelphia, Pennsylvania
- Coordinates: 39.9337°N 75.1528°W
- Area: 2 acres (0.81 ha)
- Built: 1935–1937
- Architect: Irwin T. Catharine
- Architectural style: Moderne, Art Deco
- MPS: Philadelphia Public Schools TR
- NRHP reference No.: 86003343
- Added to NRHP: December 4, 1986

Vare-Washington School, is a K-8 school in South Philadelphia, Pennsylvania, United States. It is a part of the School District of Philadelphia. It occupies the former George Washington School building in the Dickinson Narrows neighborhood, in proximity to Southwark.

== History ==
The Abigail Vare School was named after Abigail Vare, the mother of the three Vare Brothers (including William Scott Vare), who became politicians and contractors.

The historic Washington school building was designed by Irwin T. Catharine and built in 1935-1937. It is a three-story, brick and limestone building in the Art Deco / Moderne-style. It features ribbon windows, brick piers, and a projecting entrance with skyscraper-like details and rounded corners with decorative figures. The school was originally established to serve children of workers in the Philadelphia Navy Yard and had been in operation since the U.S. Civil War period.

In 1985 Washington and one other school were the first two Philadelphia public schools to sign up for Education for Parenting, a program in which students are taught about parenting by observing real infants.

The building was added to the National Register of Historic Places in 1986.

In December 2012 Superintendent William R. Hite Jr. presented a proposal that would close Washington and move Abigail Vare School into Washington's building. At the time Washington's building was in a better condition compared to Vare's, while the Vare school had an academic performance superior to that of Washington's. In March 2013, the school district voted to close Washington. Vare moved from its previous building to current building, and was renamed Vare-Washington School. Since the move, the former Vare School has remained empty.

As a result of the closing of Washington, all Washington staff and teachers were to lose their positions, even though the Washington building was staying open. On May 14, 2013, the Philadelphia Federation of Teachers filed a grievance to try to reverse this decision.

== Feeder patterns ==
Residents of the current Vare-Washington zone, and residents of the former Abigail Vare School zone, are zoned to Furness High School.

== Gallery ==
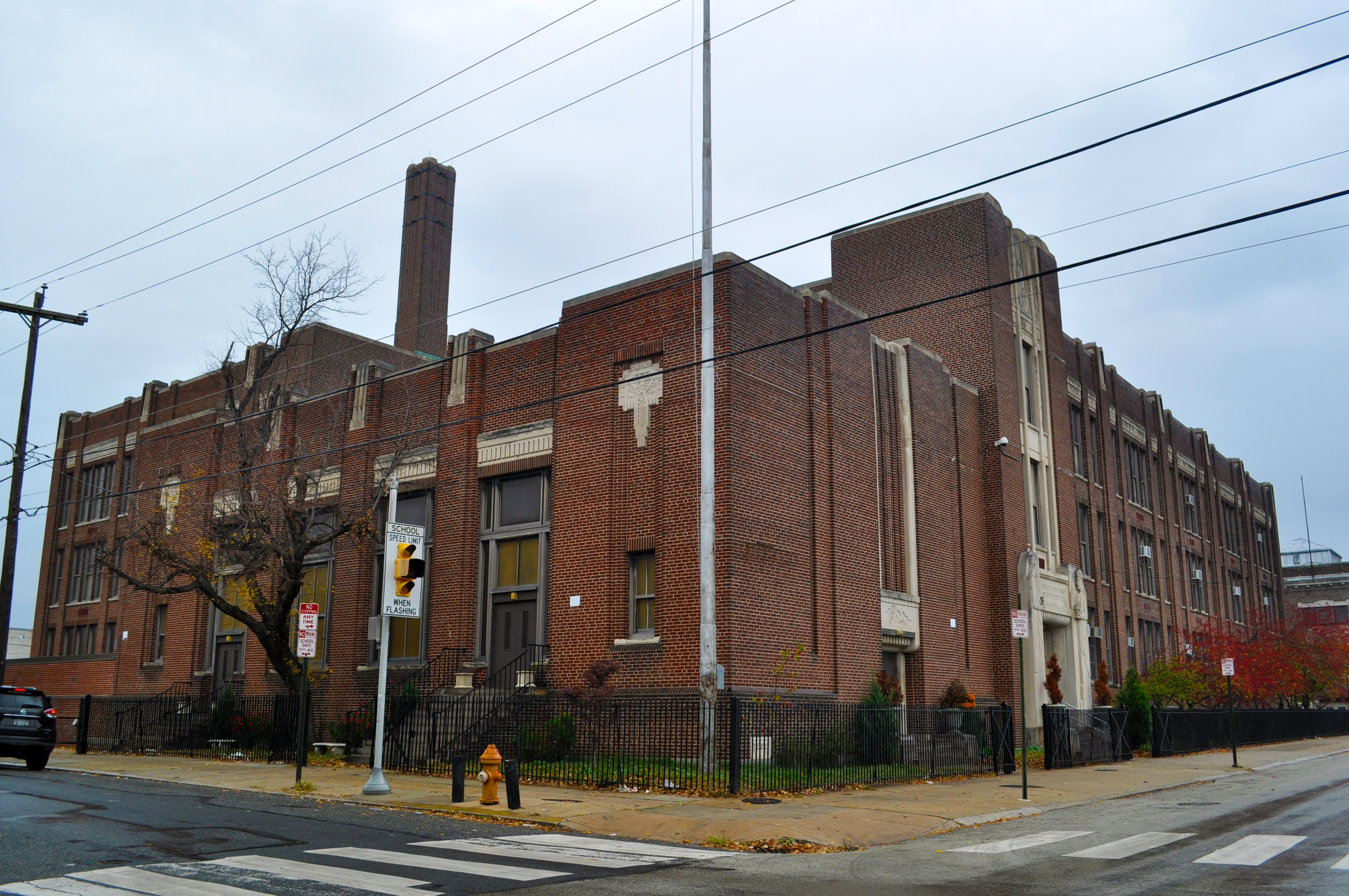

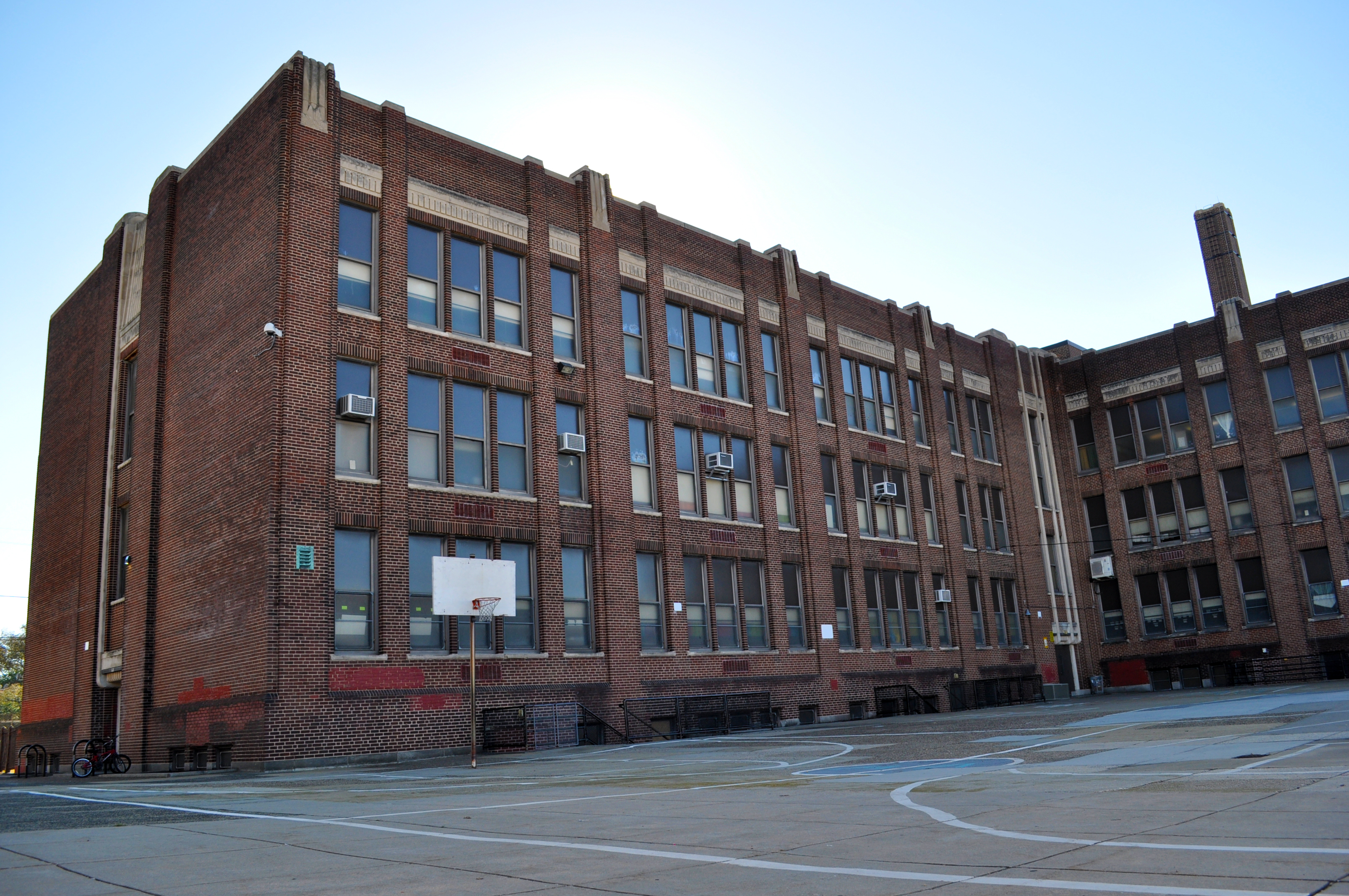

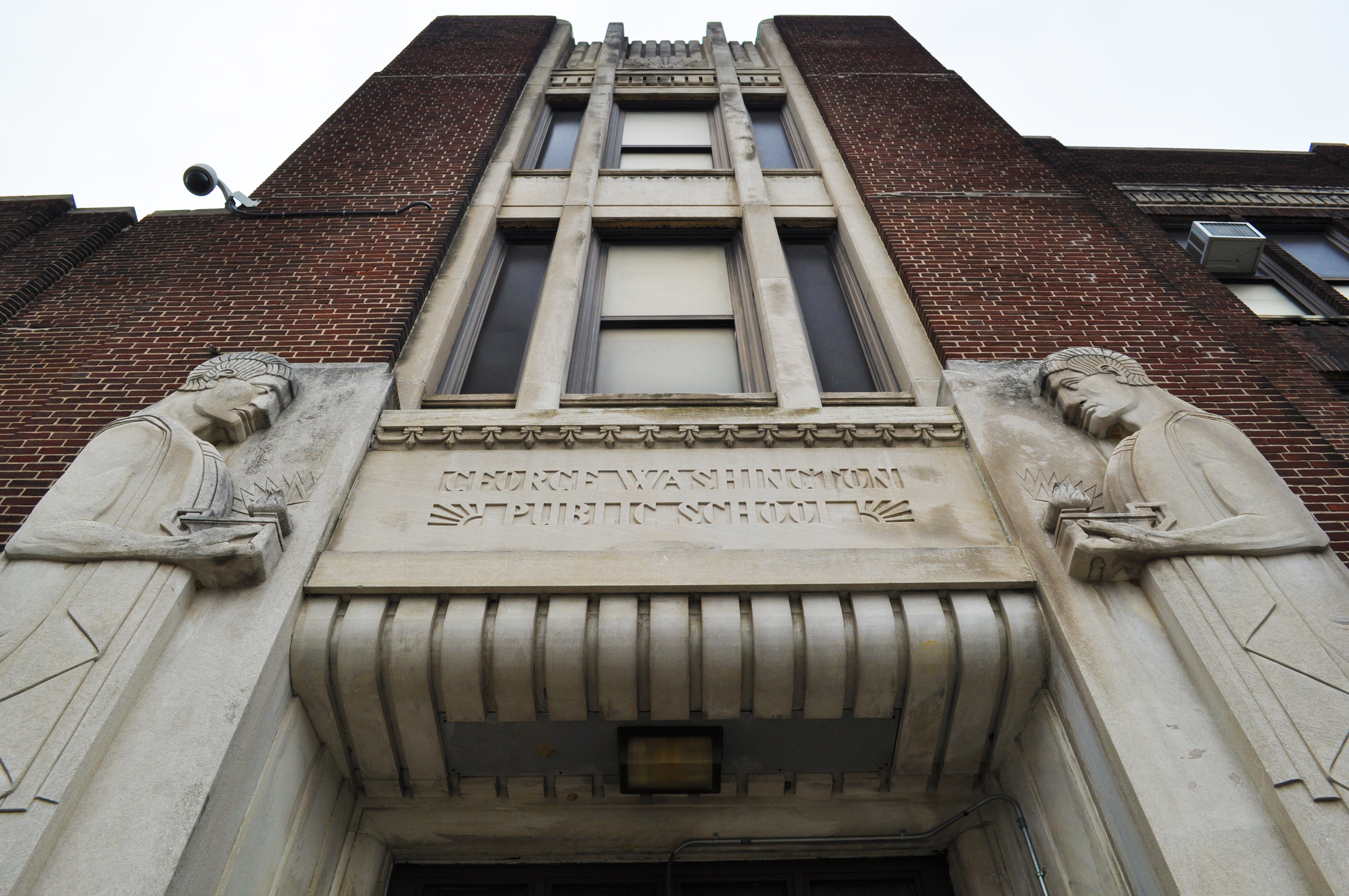

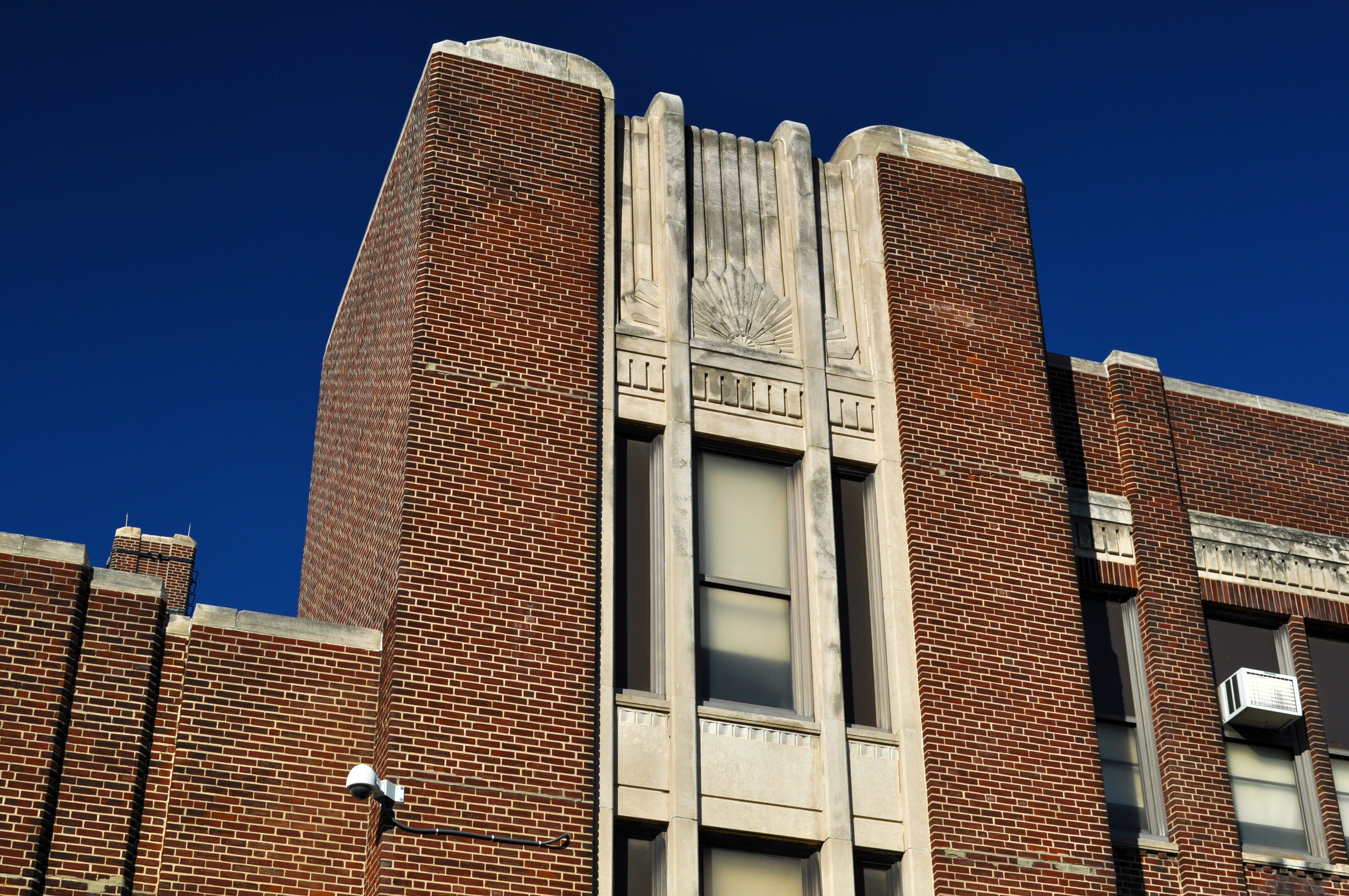

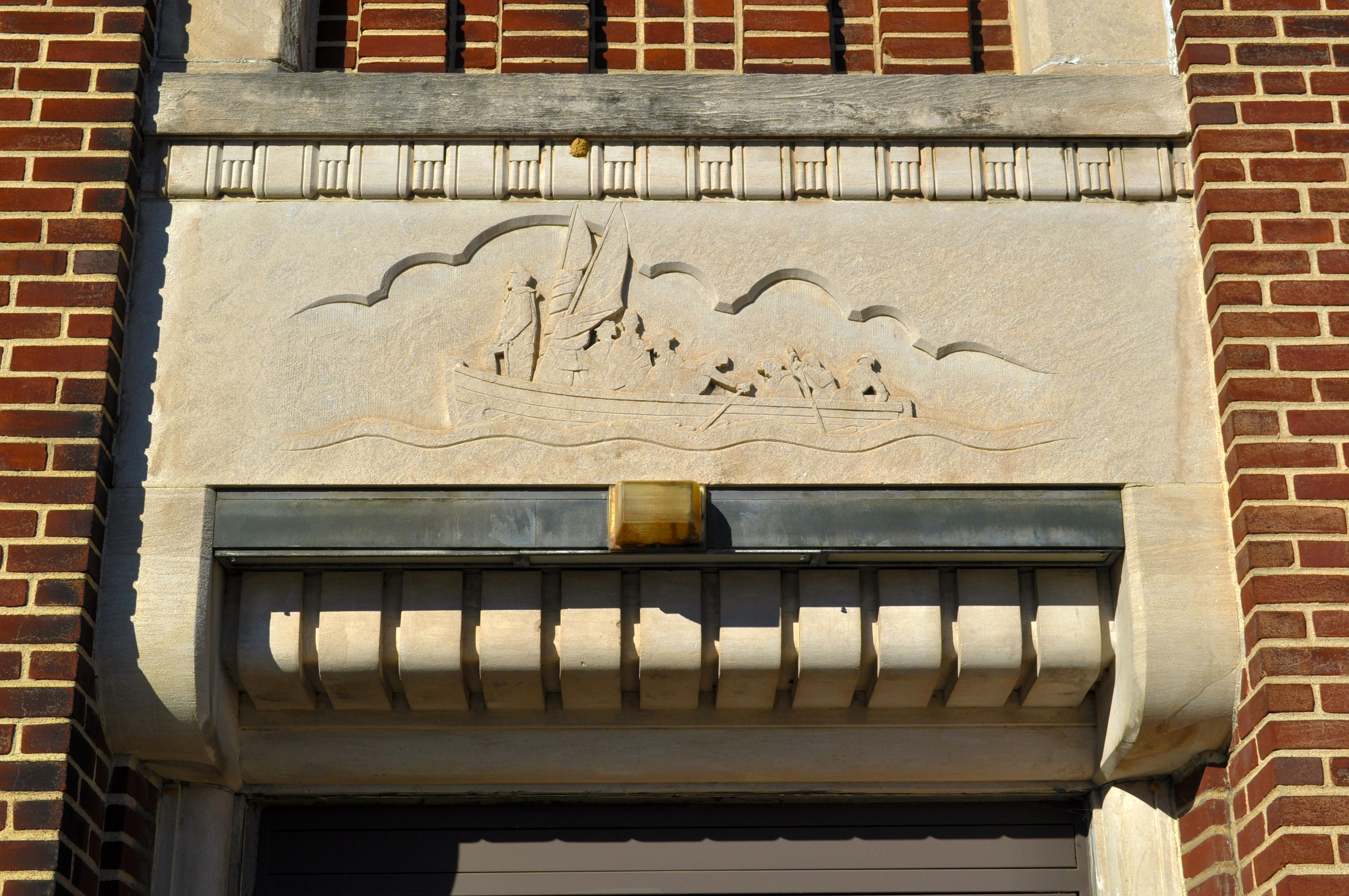

== Additional Information ==
From National Historic Landmarks & National Register of Historic Places in Pennsylvania, Pennsylvania Historic Resource Survey Form, July 1986

Physical Description

The George Washington School is similar in appearance to the Robert Fulton and George Meade Schools. Constructed of brick and limestone, the school is three stories high and spans almost the length of the block. Designed in the Art Deco/Moderne style, the building is dominated by its vertical lines. Ribbon bands of windows punctuated by thin and thick brick piers further emphasize this verticality. The main entrance, an attenuated column, projects from the building roofline in skyscraper fashion. The building fenestration pattern is regular with triplet sash separating a single sash with a thin brick pier. All of the sash is double hung six over six. Limestone sills give some horizontal emphasis to the regular pattern of the windows. A thick limestone lintel above the third floor sash is a bold contrast to the attenuated detailing above. The large brick piers, rising above the parapet line, in battlement style, have limestone caps. The main entrance tower has an ornately carved, limestone entrance surround. The overscale detail, with the characteristic rounded corners is created by two figures, wearing robes and carrying lanterns, lighting the way to the main door. These figures constitute the columns which support a smooth dressed entablature with a carved name plate and fascia detailing. Rising from the entablature is a band of windows two stories in height. The sash is figured with a double hung center opening and two small, double hung side sash. A decorative limestone panel continues to the roofline. Adjacent to the main entrance is the auditorium area which continues the building's appearance with the exception of the window pattern.
