= Lady with a Harp: Eliza Ridgely =

Painting by Thomas Sully

- Artist: Thomas Sully
- Year: 1818
- Medium: Oil on canvas
- Dimensions: 214.5 cm × 142.5 cm (84.4 in × 56.1 in)
- Location: National Gallery of Art, Washington, D.C.

Lady with a Harp: Eliza Ridgely is an oil on canvas painting by English American Thomas Sully, from 1818. It is held in the National Gallery of Art, in Washington, D.C.

== History and description ==
Sully was known as an accomplished portraitist when he created this painting. It depicts Eliza Ridgely, aged then only 15 years old, the daughter of Nicholas Ridgely, a wealthy merchant from Baltimore. The young girl appears dressed in a satin Empire dress, typical of the upper classes female fashion of her time, while she is playing gently an harp. The musical instrument is a symbol of her social status and her talent and intellectual interests. The portrait presents Eliza with a deliberate idealized appearance. Sully makes her look older than her age, and with disproportionated long legs. This exaggeration was on purpose, because like Sully stated: "From long experience I know that resemblance in a portrait is essential; but no fault will be found with the artist, at least by the sitter, if he improve the appearance." The portrait takes place with a background which opens into a landscape, with the sunset visible, giving the painting an atmosphere of a "romantic reverie", according with the National Gallery of Art website.

== Provenance ==
The portrait had been commissioned by Eliza's father, and later went to Hampson Mansion. It remained there in her family until being sold to the National Gallery of Art, in 1945.
