= Thomas Sully Residence =

Historic house in Pennsylvania, United States

- U.S. National Register of Historic Places
- U.S. National Historic Landmark
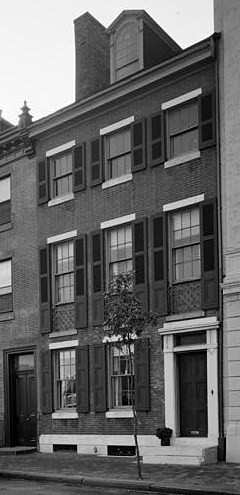
- Thomas Sully Residence

- Location within Philadelphia Location within Pennsylvania Location within the United States
- Location: 530 Spruce St., Philadelphia, Pennsylvania
- Coordinates: 39.94501°N 75.15136°W
- Built: 1828
- NRHP reference No.: 66000691

Significant dates
- Added to NRHP: December 21, 1965
- Designated NHL: December 21, 1965

The Thomas Sully Residence is a historic rowhouse at 530 Spruce Street in Philadelphia, Pennsylvania, USA. It was briefly (1828–29) a home of painter Thomas Sully (1783–1872), who lived in Philadelphia for the last 64 years of his life.

It was declared a National Historic Landmark in 1965.

It is a private residence, and is not open to the public.

== Description and history ==
The Thomas Sully House is located in Center City, Philadelphia, on the south side of Spruce Street roughly midway between 5th and 6th Streets. One of several brick rowhouses on the block, it is 3 1/2 stories in height, with a gabled roof pierced by a single gabled dormer.

The facade is three bays wide, with the entrance in the rightmost bay. The entrance is framed by pilasters, and a transom window with cornice above. The trim is all white marble.

The building is not architecturally distinguished.

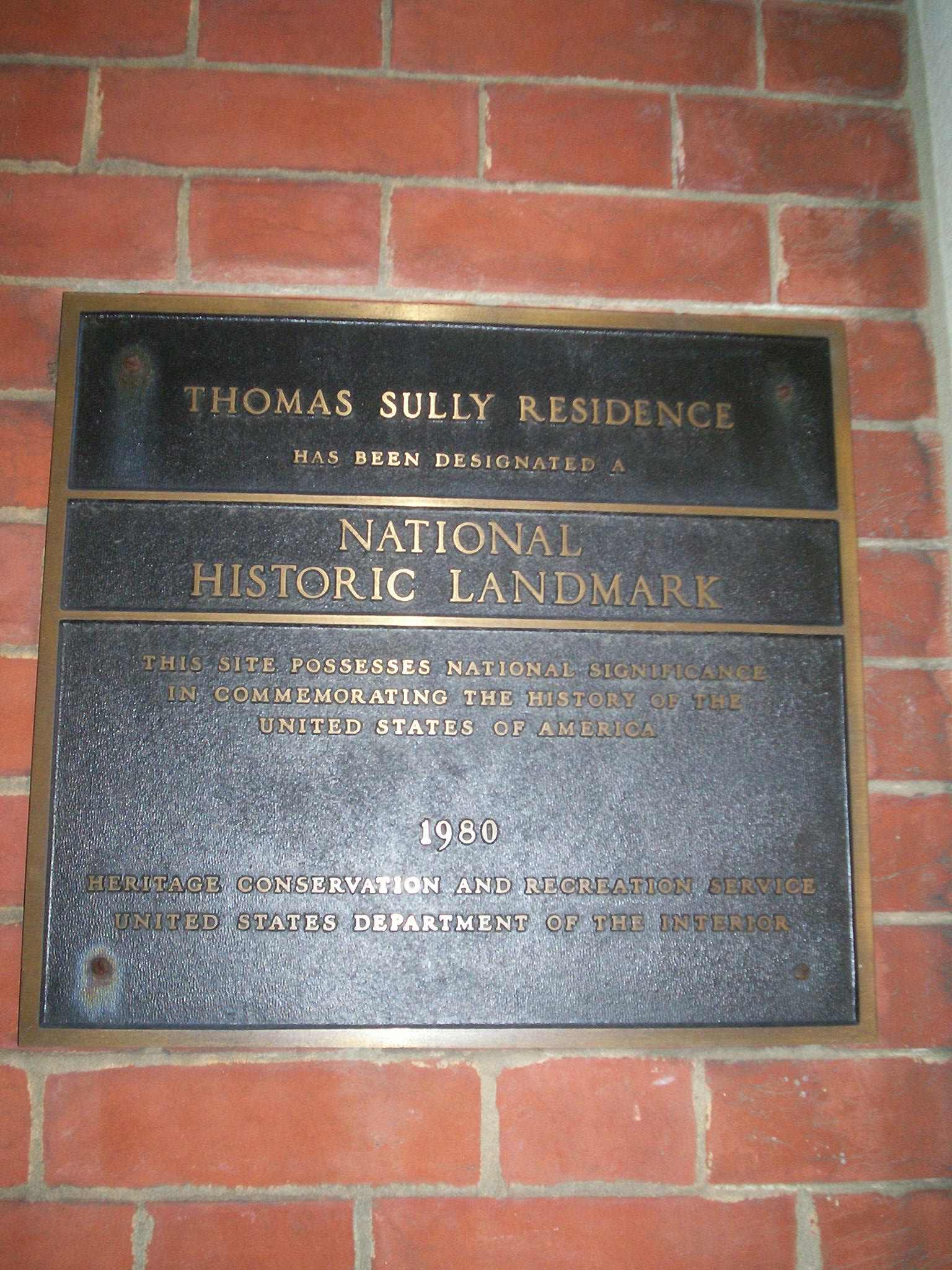
Plaque on the former home of Thomas Sully in Society Hill

The house was built in 1820, with subsequent construction in 1860.

It is one of many homes occupied by the painter Thomas Sully during sixty-four years of residence in the city. Although he was born in England, Sully came to the United States as a child in 1792, and became one of the nation's most prolific painters of the first half of the 19th century, producing more than 2,600 works in his long career.

After living in Charleston, South Carolina and New York City, Sully came to Philadelphia in 1808.

It remained his home until his death in 1872, although he is recorded as living at many different local addresses.

== See also ==
- List of National Historic Landmarks in Philadelphia
- National Register of Historic Places listings in Center City, Philadelphia
