= Rosalie Sully =

American painter (1818-1847)

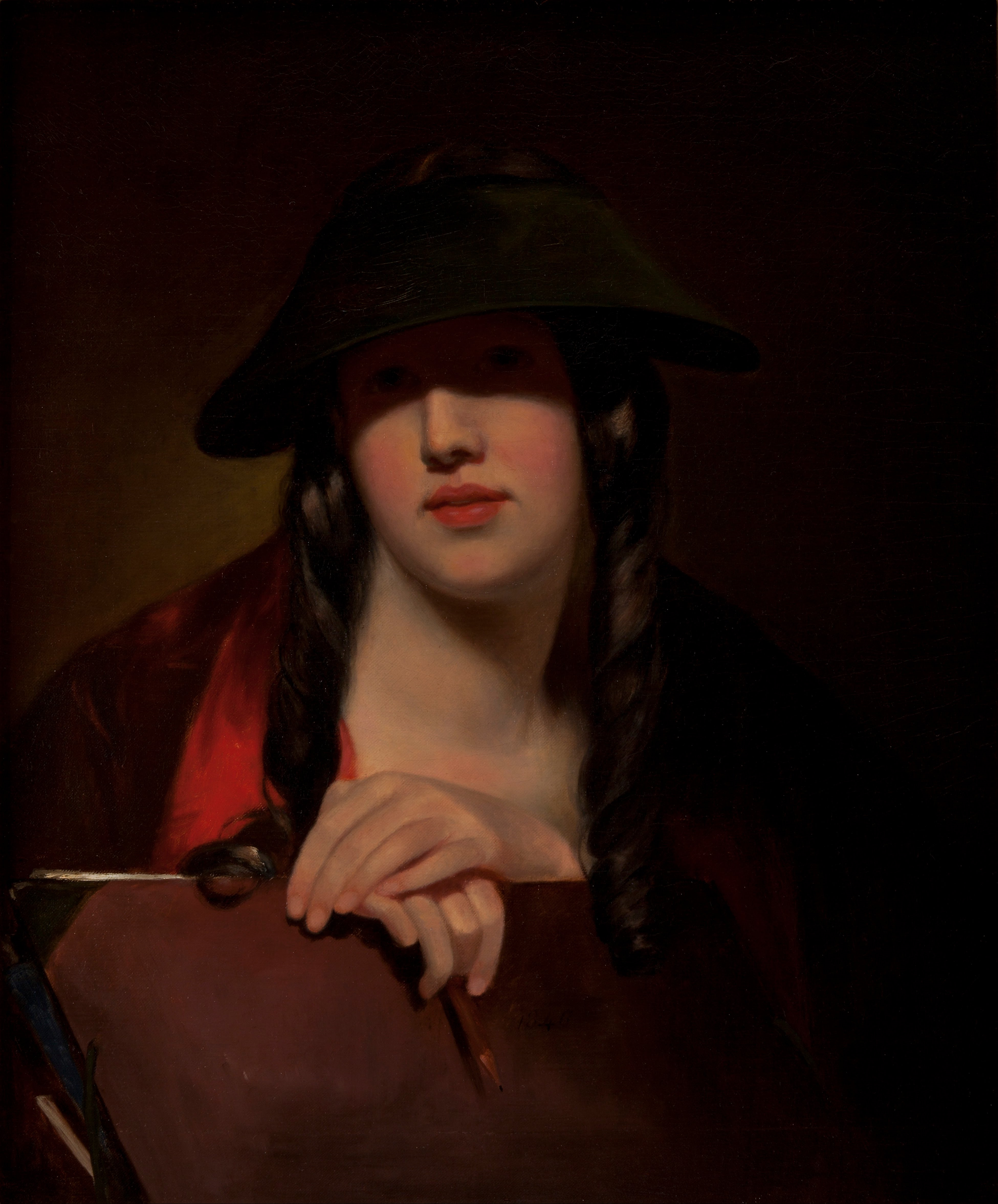
- Rosalie Sully, painted by Thomas Sully
- Born: June 3, 1818
- Died: July 8, 1847 (aged 29); Philadelphia, Pennsylvania, U.S.
- Resting place: Laurel Hill Cemetery, Philadelphia, Pennsylvania, U.S.
- Occupation: Painter
- Relatives: Thomas Sully (father); Alfred Sully (brother)

Rosalie Kemble Sully (June 3, 1818 – July 8, 1847) was an American landscape and portrait miniature painter. She is the daughter of the famous painter Thomas Sully and had a romantic relationship with Charlotte Cushman.

== Early life ==
Sully was born on June 3, 1818, to the famous painter Thomas Sully and Sarah Annis Sully.

== Career ==
Sully was a painter and exhibited her landscape paintings in New York in 1839, but was dependent on her family for financial support. She painted several miniatures for family and friends including actress Charlotte Cushman. Her work was created in a small studio adjoining her father's larger studio.

== Personal life ==
Sully met Charlotte Cushman in the summer of 1843, when Cushman hired Rosalie's father to paint her portrait. After their meeting, Cushman and Sully became romantically involved and exchanged many passionate letters. On June 1, 1844, Cushman sent Sully a ring for her birthday, a precursor of events to come. On July 5, 1844, Cushman wrote in her diary that she had "Slept with Rose" and, on July 6, 1844, Cushman wrote that they were "married". However, their time together as a "married" couple was short-lived. Cushman left in November 1844 on an English tour, which put a strain on the couple's relationship but did not end it, until Sully found out that Cushman had started seeing someone else overseas. Upon receipt of this news, Sully sank into a severe depression which she remained in until her death.

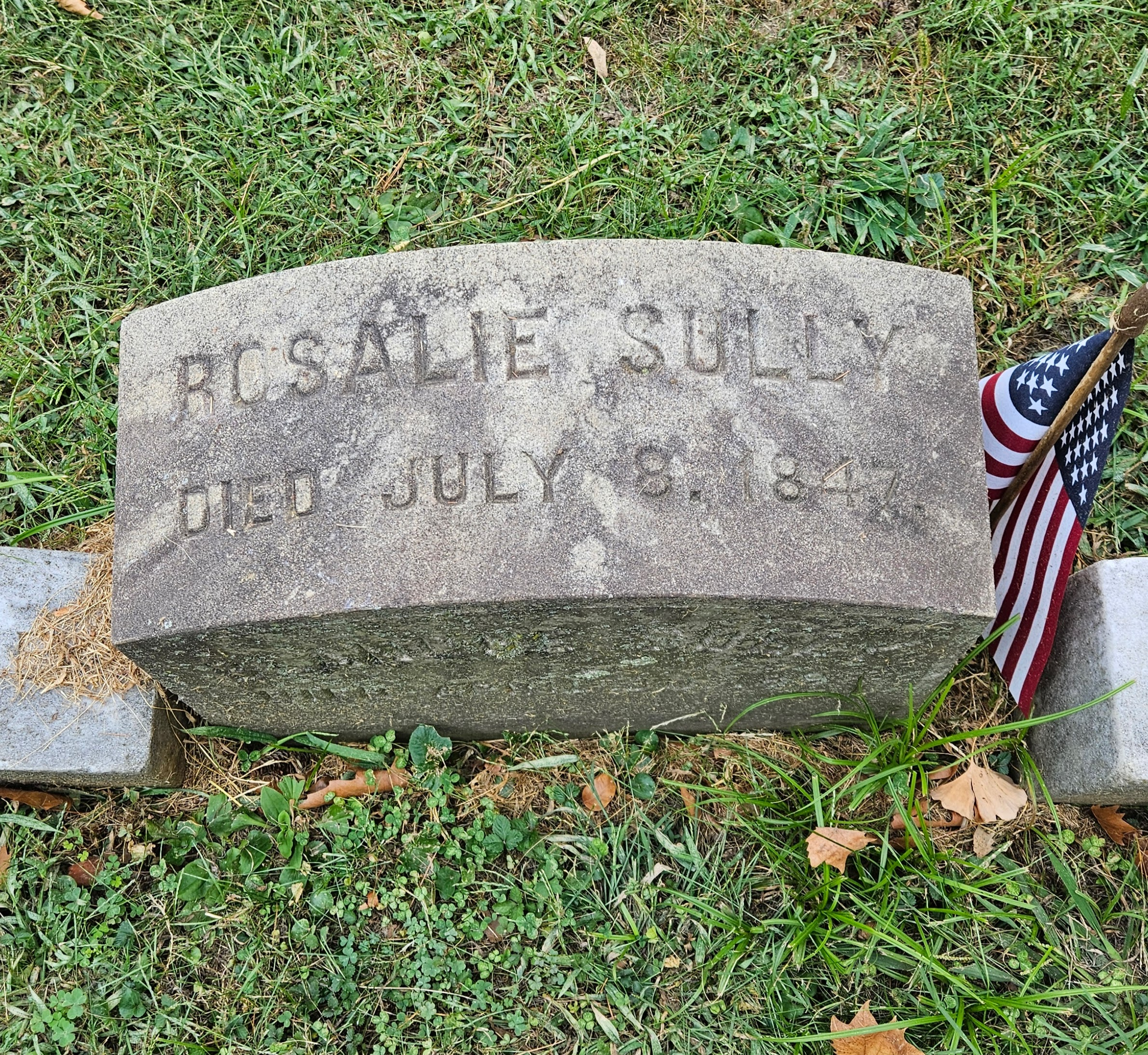
Rosalie Sully tombstone in Laurel Hill Cemetery

Sully died from fever on July 8, 1847, in Philadelphia, and was interred at Laurel Hill Cemetery.
