= Cinderella at the Kitchen Fire =

Painting by Thomas Sully

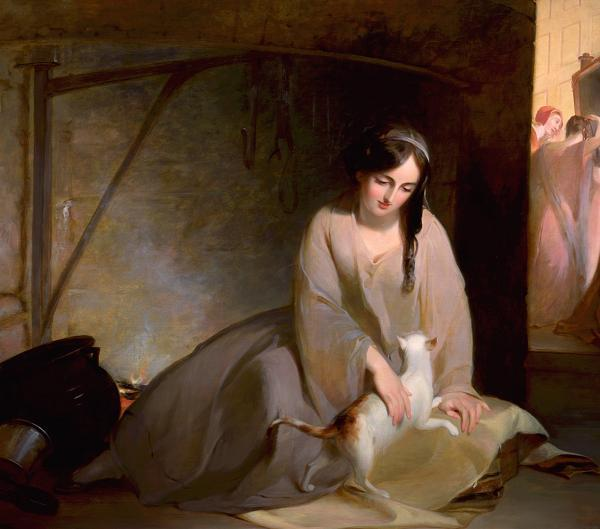
- Artist: Thomas Sully
- Year: 1843
- Medium: Oil on canvas
- Dimensions: 147.32 cm × 62.56 cm (58.00 in × 24.63 in)
- Location: Dallas Museum of Art, Dallas

Cinderella at the Kitchen Fire is an oil on canvas painting by English-American painter Thomas Sully, from 1843. It is held at the Dallas Museum of Art.

== History and description ==
Sully, since the late 1830s, made several paintings inspired by literary subjects, mostly because he was facing financial problems. This painting, inspired by the fairy tale "Cinderella, or the Little Glass Slipper" by Charles Perrault, became one of the most famous he made in this genre. The current work illustrates a scene from Cinderella's life of poverty. The beautiful looking girl is seated in the ground, near the kitchen fire, with some sparks still visible, and a fallen black pot at her left. She is dressed poorly and plainly, in a greyish dress, while she pets gently a playful cat. She is framed by the kitchen fire that serves as her background. The scene illustrates not only Cinderella's harsh life of servitude to her stepsisters and stepmother, but also her kind and gentle character. At the right background, her two mean stepsisters are preparing themselves for the upcoming ball, to which also Cinderella would surprisingly attend.
