= Thomas Sully =

American painter (1783-1872)

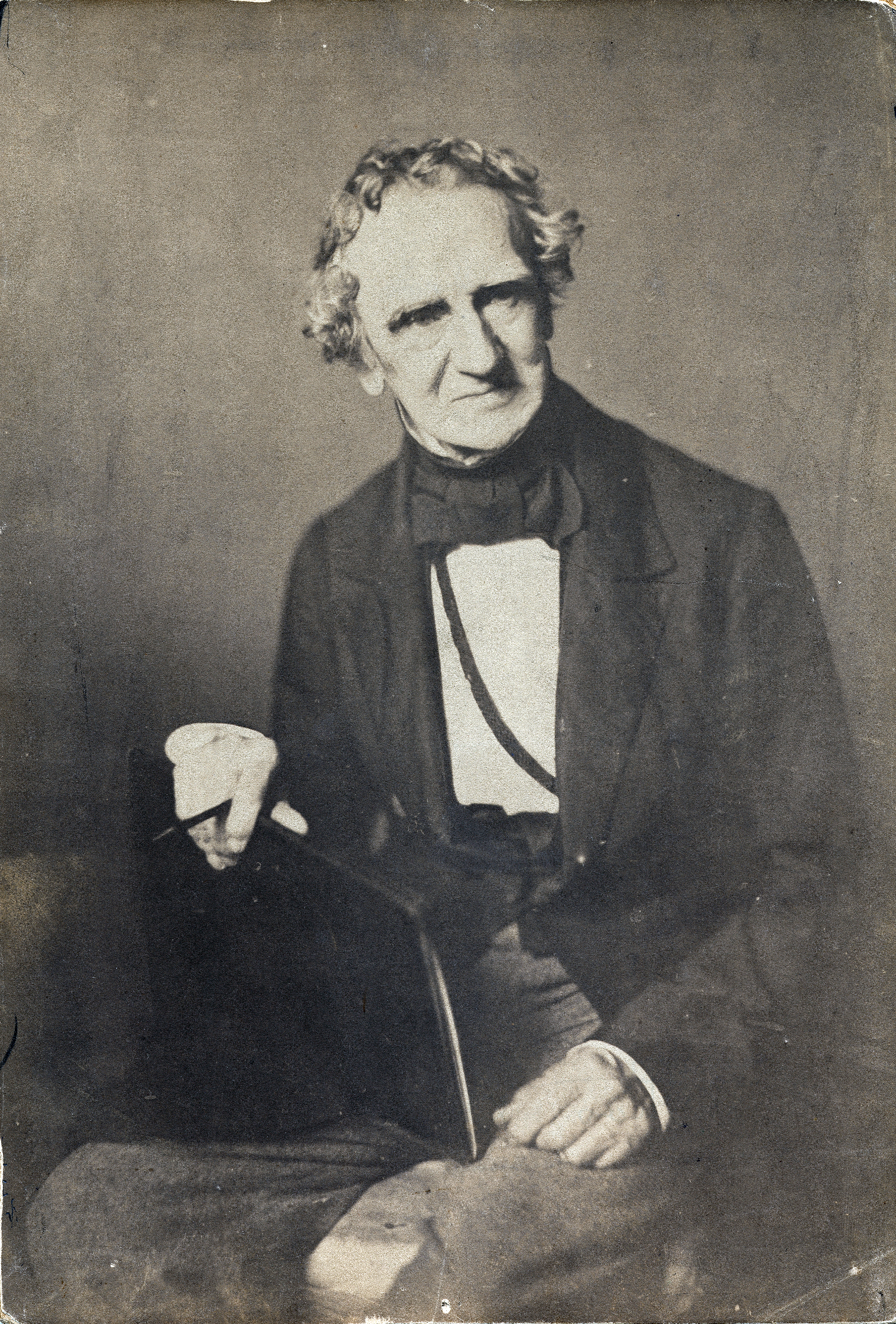
- Sully in 1869
- Born: June 19, 1783; Horncastle, Lincolnshire, England
- Died: November 5, 1872 (aged 89); Philadelphia, Pennsylvania, U.S.
- Resting place: Laurel Hill Cemetery, Philadelphia, Pennsylvania, U.S.
- Occupation: Painter
- Spouse: Sarah (Annis) Sully (m. 1805)
- Children: 9, including: Alfred Sully; Rosalie Sully
- Parents: Matthew Sully (father); Sarah Chester (mother)

Thomas Sully (June 19, 1783 – November 5, 1872) was an English-American portrait painter. He was born in England, became a naturalized American citizen in 1809, and lived most of his life in Philadelphia, Pennsylvania, including in the Thomas Sully Residence. He studied painting in England under Benjamin West. He painted in the style of Thomas Lawrence and has been referred to as the "Sir Thomas Lawrence of America".

He produced over 2,300 paintings over his 70 year career. His subjects included United States presidents Thomas Jefferson, John Quincy Adams, and Andrew Jackson; Revolutionary War hero General Marquis de Lafayette, and Queen Victoria. In addition to portraits of wealthy patrons, he painted landscapes and historical pieces such as the 1819 The Passage of the Delaware. His work was adapted for use on United States coinage.

== Early life ==
Sully was born in Horncastle, Lincolnshire, England in 1783 to actors Matthew Sully and Sarah Chester. In March 1792, the Sullys and their nine children emigrated to Charleston, South Carolina, where Thomas's uncle Thomas Wade West managed a theater. Sully made his first appearance in the theater as a tumbler at the age of 11. After a brief apprenticeship to an insurance broker, who recognized his artistic talent, at about age 12 Sully began painting. He went to school with Charles Fraser and received informal instruction from him. He studied with his brother-in-law Jean Belzons (active 1794–1812), a French miniaturist, until they had a falling-out in 1799. Between 1801 and 1802, Sully lived in Norfolk, Virginia, the city from which his aunt Margaretta Sully West ran her theater and opera company.

== Career ==
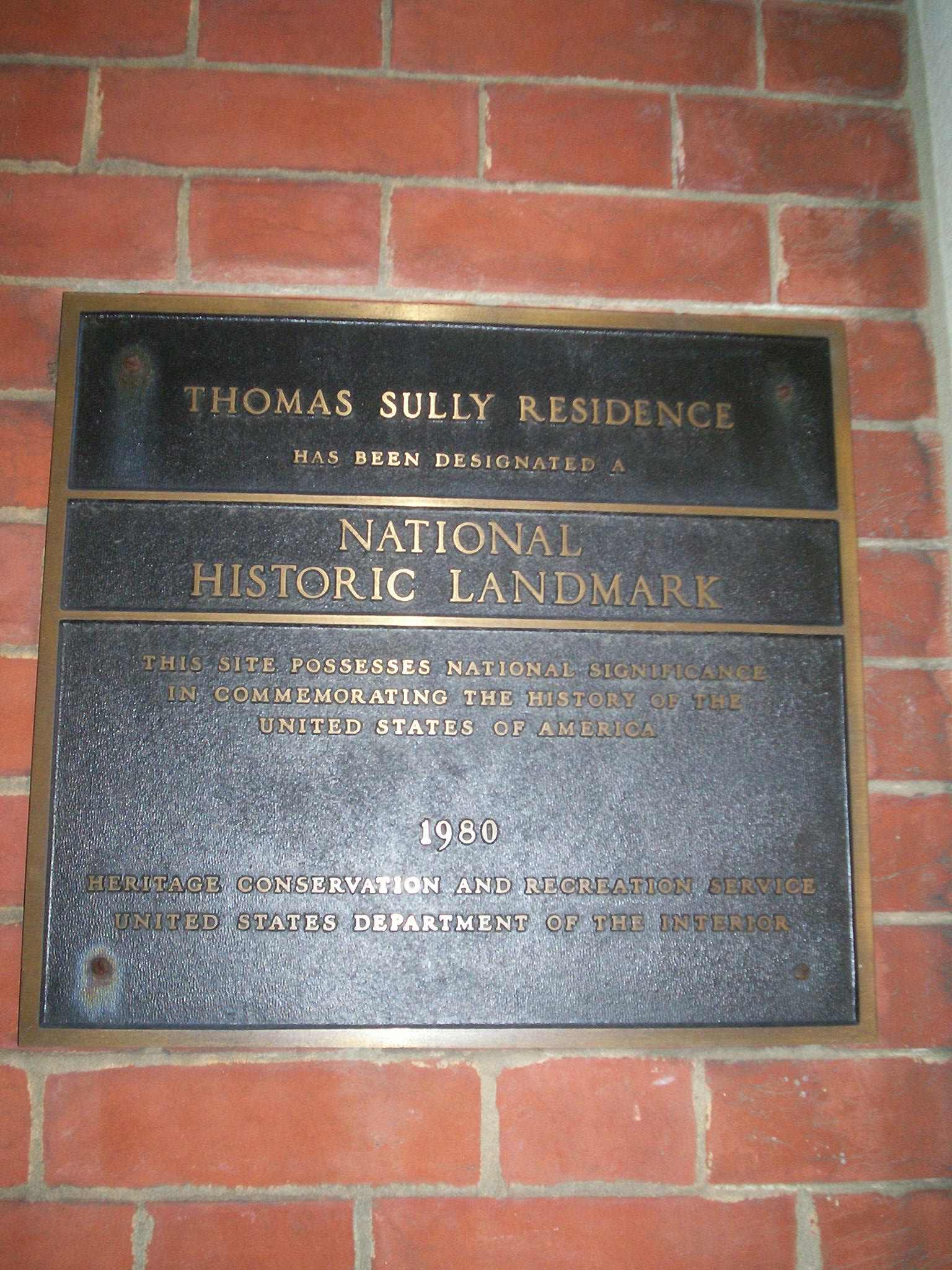
Plaque on the former home of Thomas Sully in Society Hill

Sully became a professional painter at age 18 in 1801, while living in Norfolk, Virginia, with his brother Lawrence. By 1802, he and elder brother Lawrence Sully changed their base to Richmond, Virginia, where they continued to work together. In 1805, Thomas Sully married his brother's widow, Sarah (Annis) Sully. He took on the rearing of Lawrence's children.

Sully moved to New York in 1806. The next year, he studied portrait painting under Gilbert Stuart in Boston for three weeks. By 1808, he had settled in Philadelphia, where he resided for the remainder of his life. He received his American citizenship on May 17, 1809, and soon after traveled to London for nine months of study under Benjamin West, who had established his painting career in London. Sully also befriended the portrait painter Charles Bird King who was also studying under West in London.

West had stopped painting portraits and encouraged Sully to study the work of portrait artists he admired. Sully formed a friendship with Thomas Lawrence, whose influence was so profound that Sully came to be known as the "Sir Thomas Lawrence of America." Sully returned to the U.S. in 1810.

Sully's 1824 portraits of John Quincy Adams, who became President within the year, and the general Marquis de Lafayette, brought him widespread recognition. His Adams portrait is held in the National Gallery of Art, Washington. Many notable Americans of the day had their portraits painted by him. In 1837–1838, he was in London to paint Queen Victoria at the request of the St. George Society of Philadelphia. His daughter Blanche assisted him as the Queen's "stand-in," modeling the Queen's costume when she was not available. One of Sully's portraits of Thomas Jefferson is owned by the Jefferson Literary and Debating Society at the University of Virginia and hangs in that school's rotunda. Another Jefferson portrait, this one head-to-toe, hangs at West Point, as does his portrait of General Alexander Macomb.

Sully taught portrait painting to Marcus Aurelius Root, who later became an internationally successful daguerreotypist. Other students of his included Jacob Eichholtz, Charles Robert Leslie and John Neagle.

Sully was a prolific artist and produced more than 2,300 paintings over the course of his seventy year career. His style resembles that of Thomas Lawrence.(cf. Rilla Evelyn Jackman "AMERICAN ARTS" 1928 pg. 61) Though best known as a portrait painter, Sully also made historical pieces and landscapes. An example of the former is the 1819 The Passage of the Delaware, now in the Museum of Fine Arts, Boston.

== Professional connections and honors ==
Sully was one of the founding members of The Musical Fund Society in Philadelphia. He painted the portraits of many of the musicians and composers who were also members. In 1812, he was elected as an honorary member of the Pennsylvania Academy of Fine Arts and served in multiple roles including as a member of the board of directors until 1831. In 1835, Sully was elected a member of the American Philosophical Society.

== Death and legacy ==
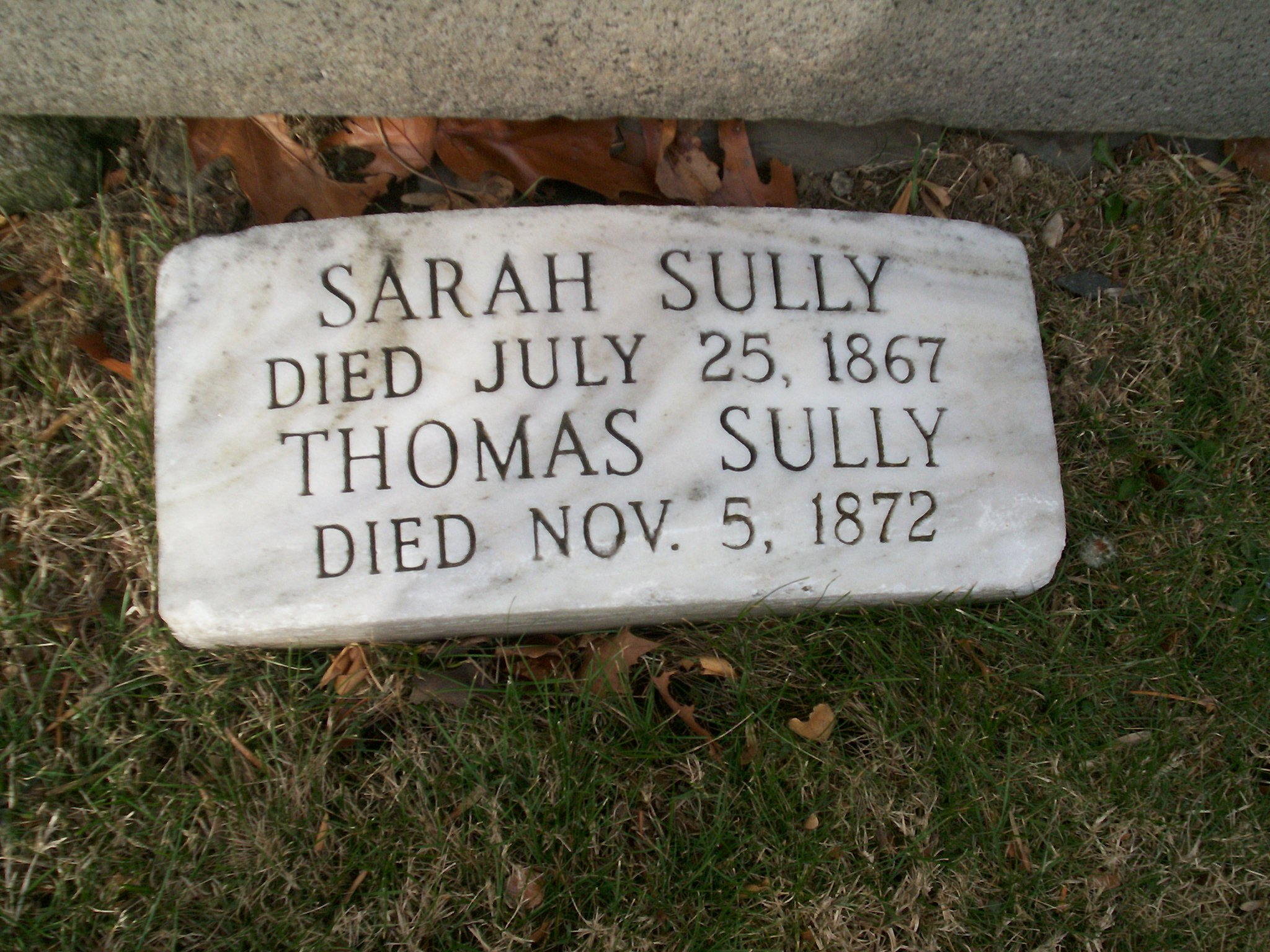
Grave marker for Thomas Sully and his wife Sarah

Sully died in Philadelphia on November 5, 1872, and was interred in Laurel Hill Cemetery.

His book Hints to Young Painters was published posthumously.

His paintings are held and displayed permanently in many of the world's leading art museums. Two of Sully's portraits hang in the chambers of the Dialectic and Philanthropic societies of the University of North Carolina. Portraits, including that of President James K. Polk, were commissioned of notable alumni from the Societies. The obverse design of the United States Seated Liberty coinage, which began with the Gobrecht dollar in 1836 and lasted until 1891, was based on his work. The Sully painting Portrait of Anna and Harriet Coleman was sold at auction in 2013 for $145,000.

== Personal life ==
Thomas and Sarah Sully had nine children together. Among the children were Alfred Sully, Mary Chester Sully (who married Sully's protégé, the painter John Neagle), Jane Cooper Sully (who married a Mr. Darley who would later have a son, Francis Thomas Sully Darley, who would marry, Cecelia Baldwin the daughter of Mathias W. Baldwin), Blanche Sully, Rosalie Sully, and Thomas Wilcocks Sully.

His son, Alfred Sully, served as a brigadier general in the Union Army during the American Civil War. Through Alfred, Thomas Sully is the great-grandfather of Ella Deloria, the noted Yankton Dakota ethnologist and writer; the great-grandfather of artist Mary Sully (also known as Susan Mabel Deloria, 1896–1963); and the great-great-grandfather of Vine Deloria, Jr., Standing Rock Dakota scholar and author of Custer Died For Your Sins (1969), an American Indian civil-rights manifesto.

Sully was a great-uncle of Thomas Sully (1855–1939), the New Orleans–based architect who was named for him.

The World War II Liberty Ship SS Thomas Sully was named in his honor.

== Gallery of works ==
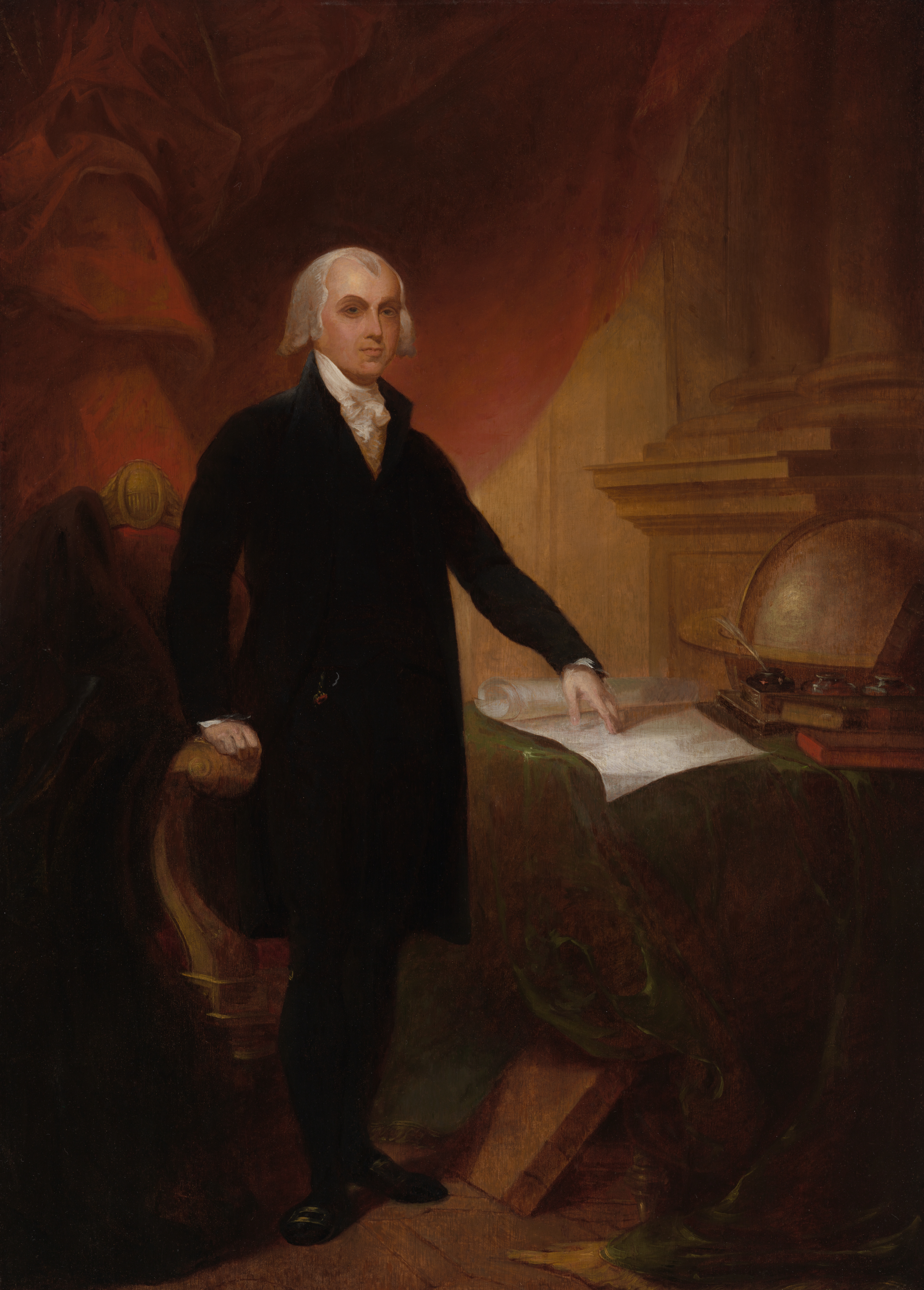
Portrait of James Madison, c. 1809, oil on panel

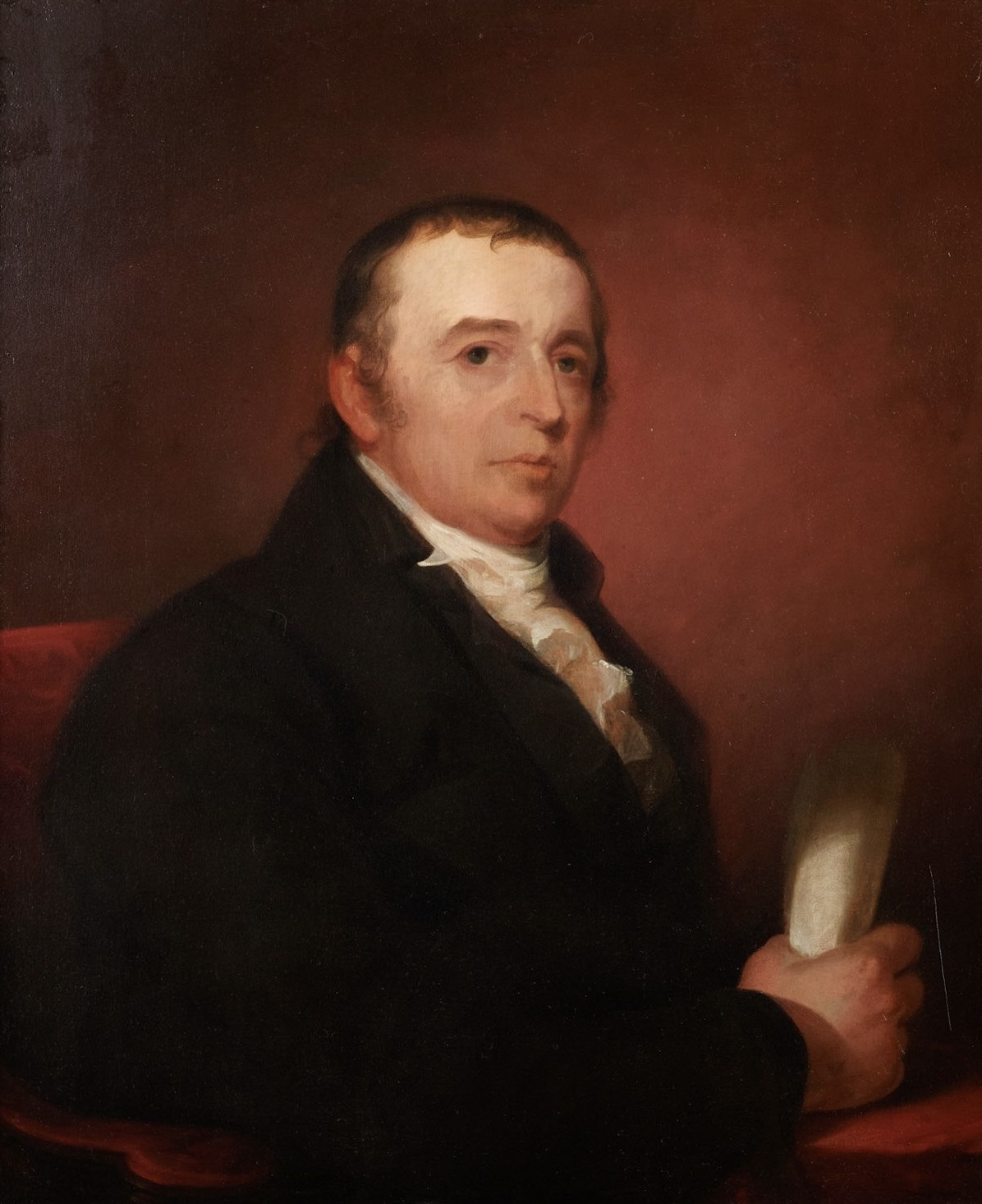
Portrait of Simon Snyder, c. 1809, oil on panel

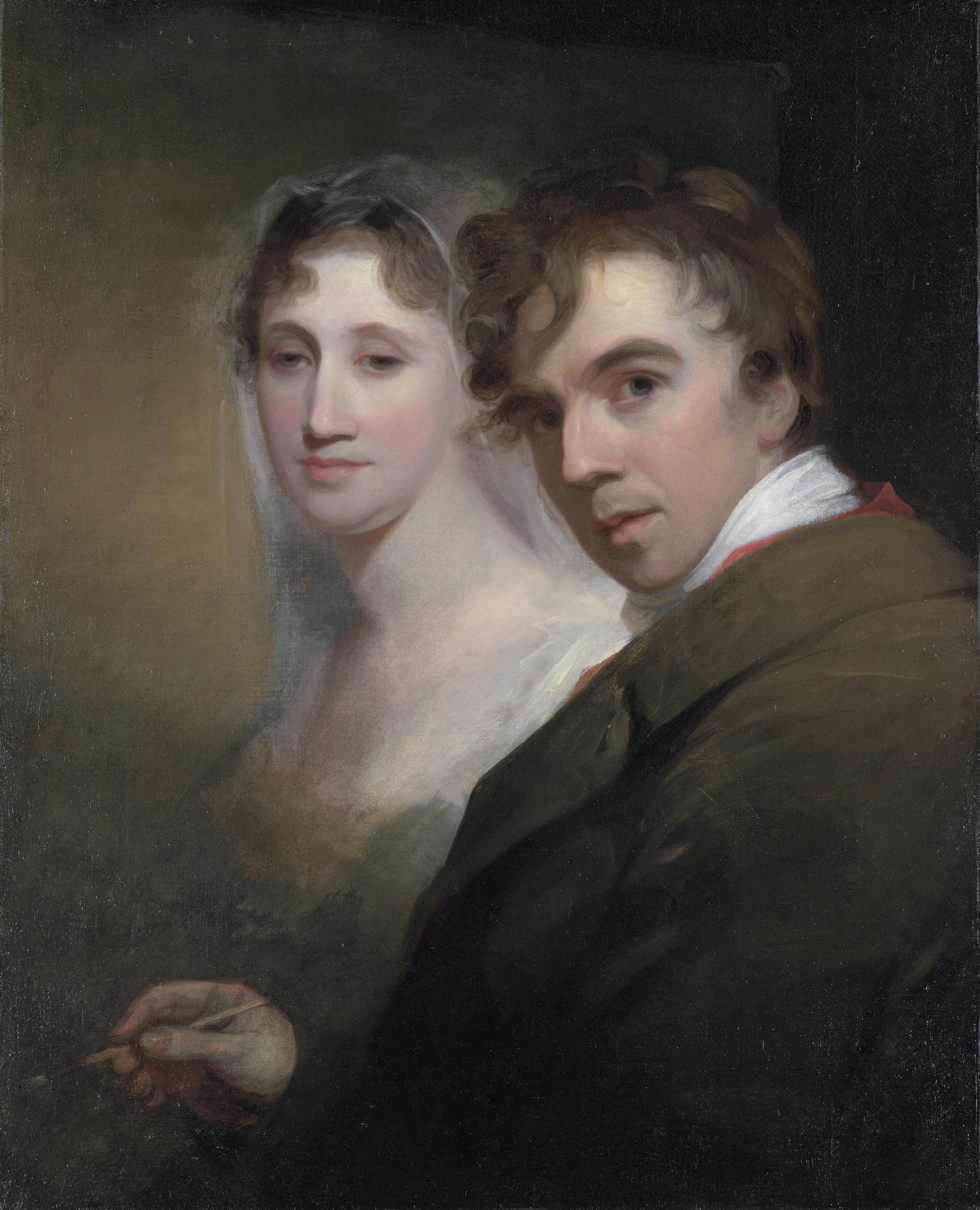
Portrait of the Artist Painting His Wife, c. 1810, oil on canvas, Yale University Art Gallery

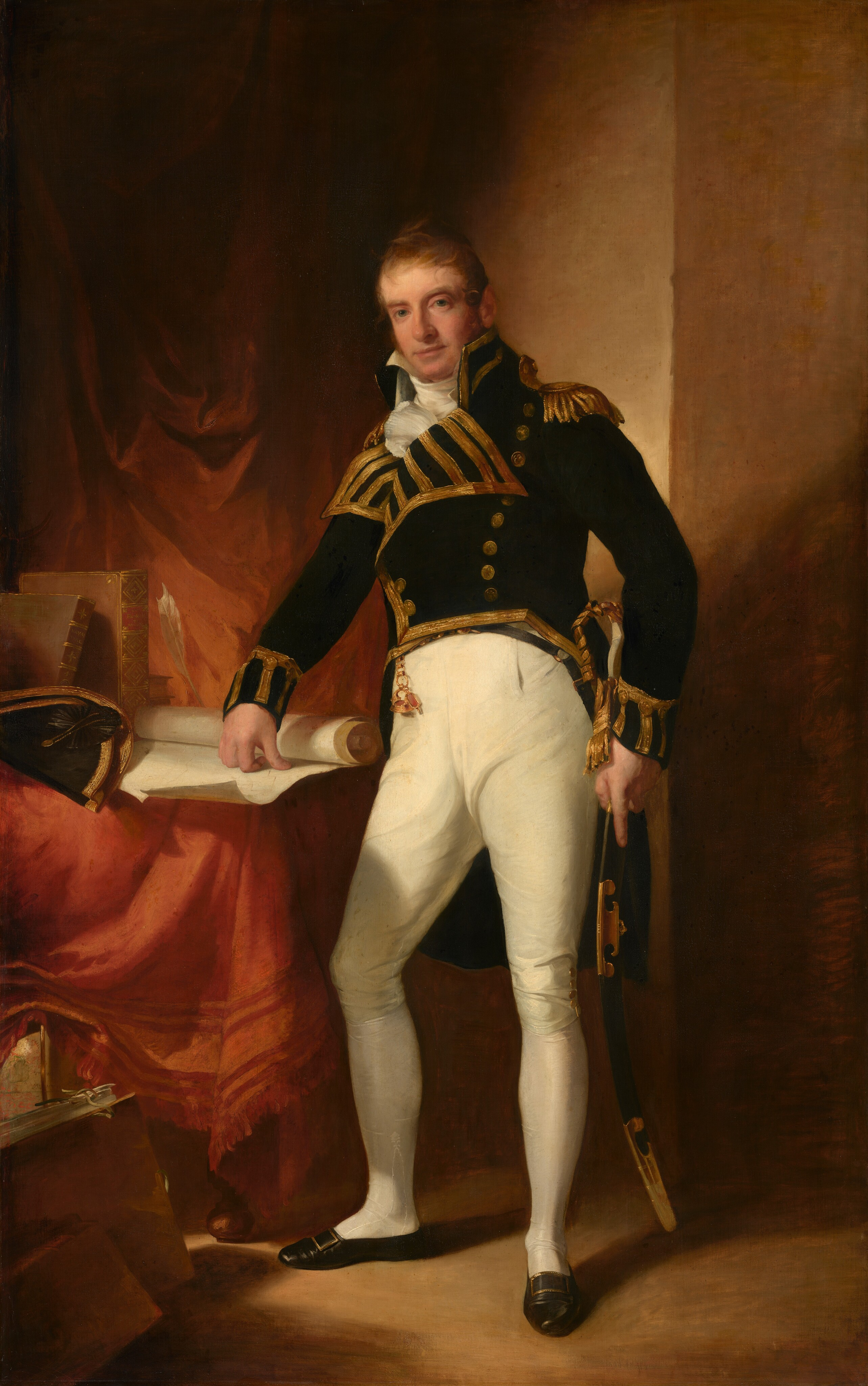
Portrait of Charles Stewart, c. 1811–1812, oil on canvas, National Gallery of Art

Lady with a Harp: Eliza Ridgely, 1818, a portrait of Eliza Ridgely, was at Hampton Mansion from the 1820s to 1945, when it was sold to the National Gallery of Art.

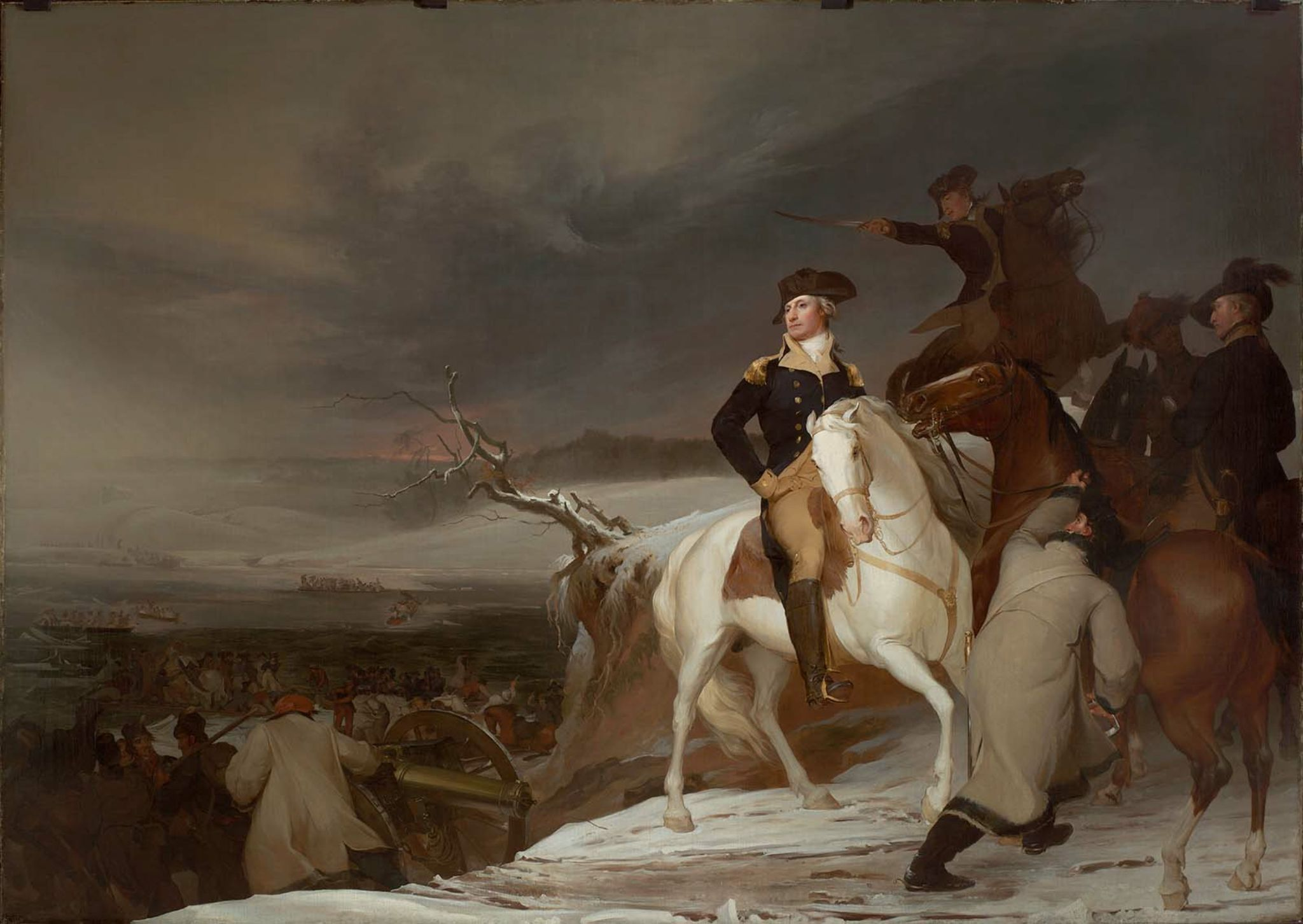
The Passage of the Delaware, 1819, Museum of Fine Arts, Boston

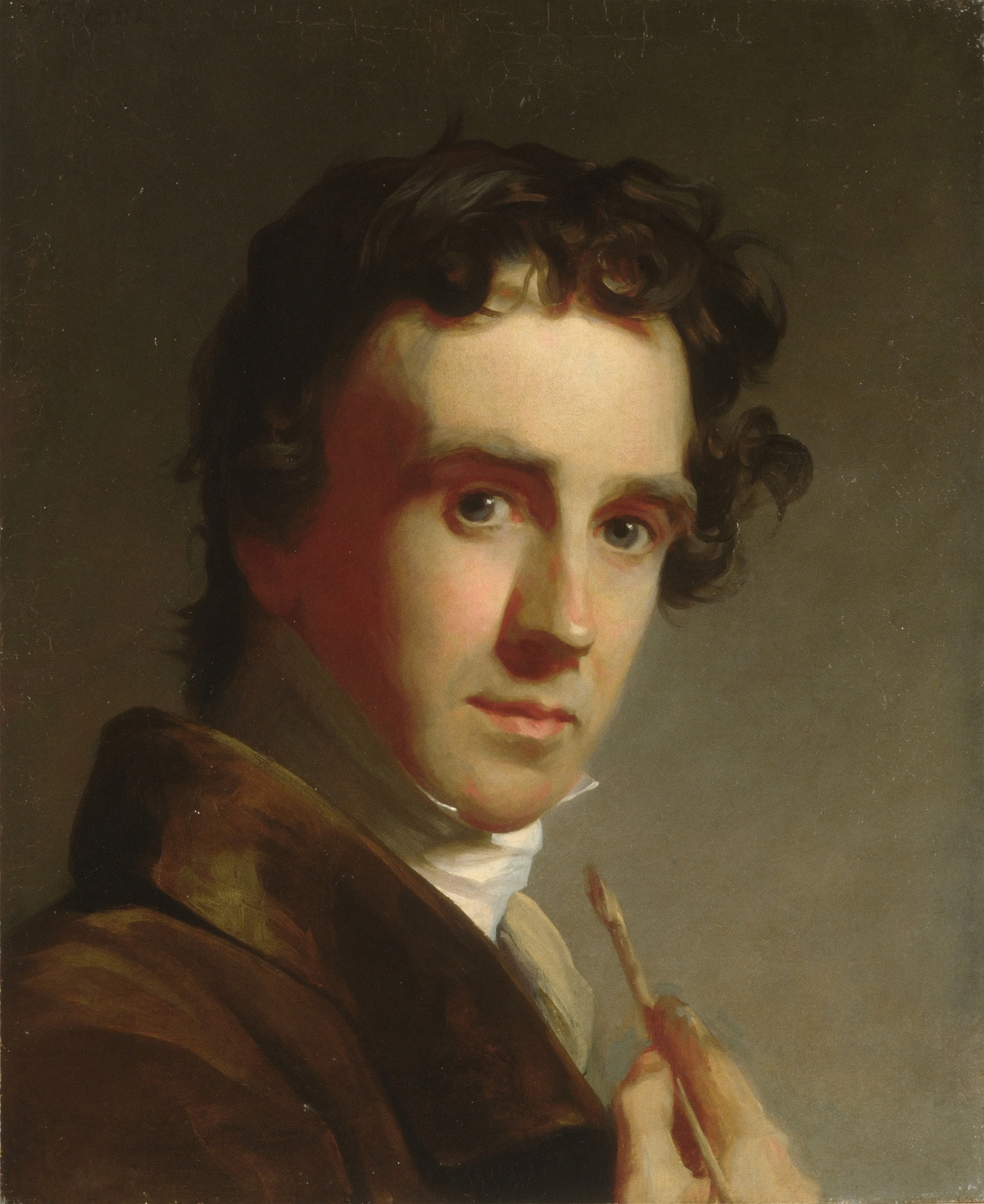
Portrait of the Artist, 1821, Metropolitan Museum of Art

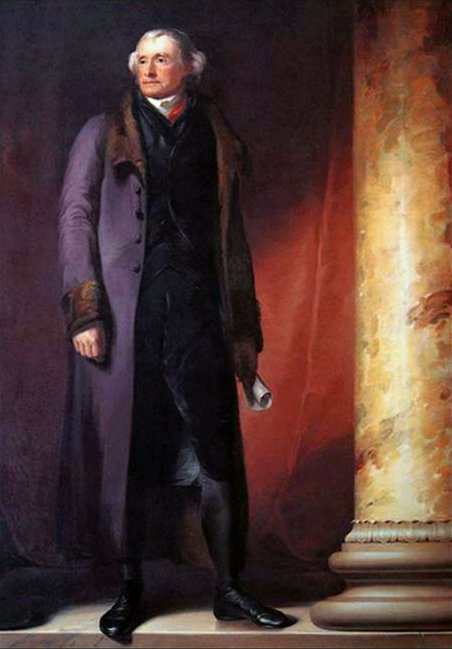
Portrait of Thomas Jefferson, c. 1821, West Point

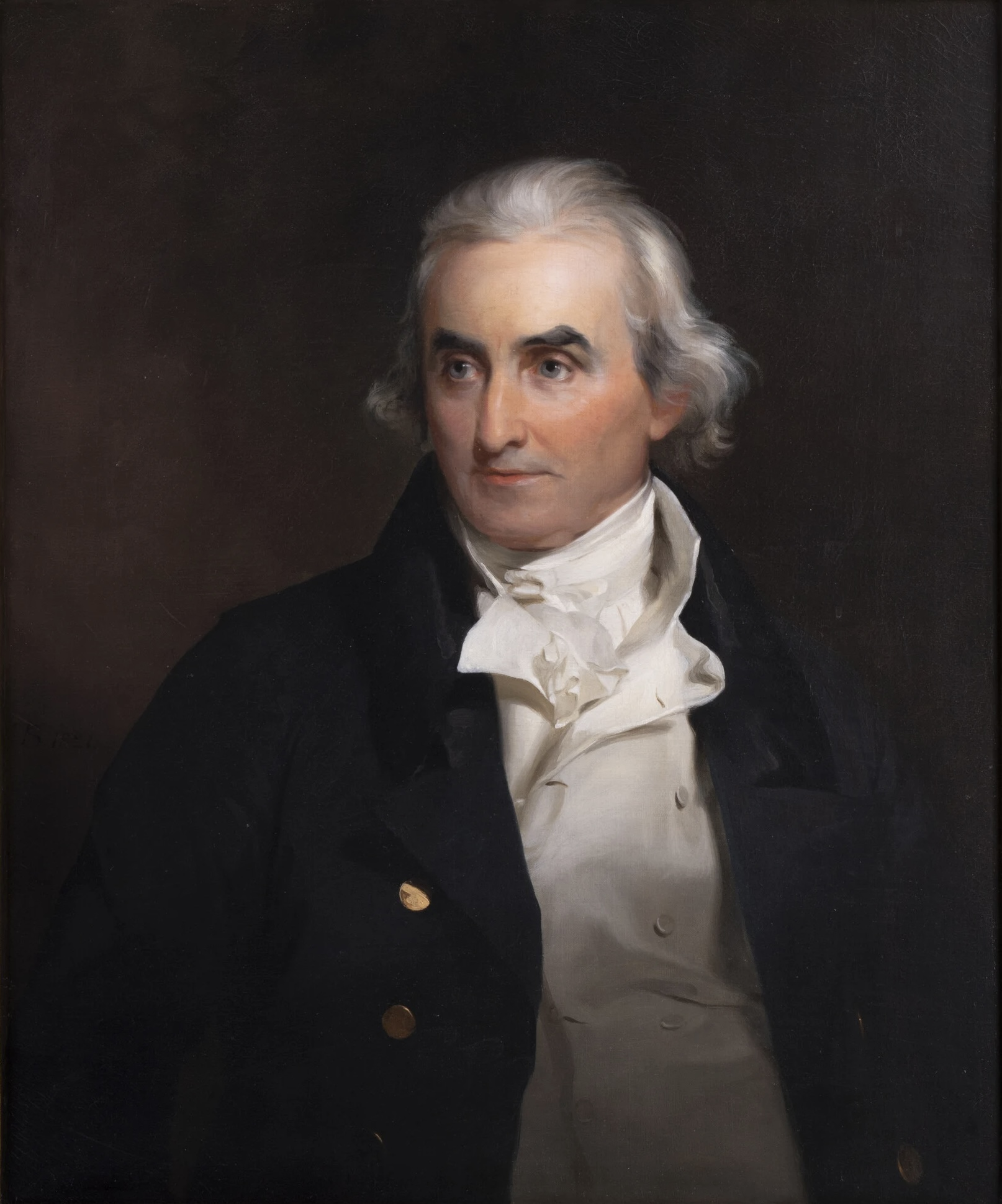
Portrait of William Patterson, c. 1821, Maryland Center for History and Culture

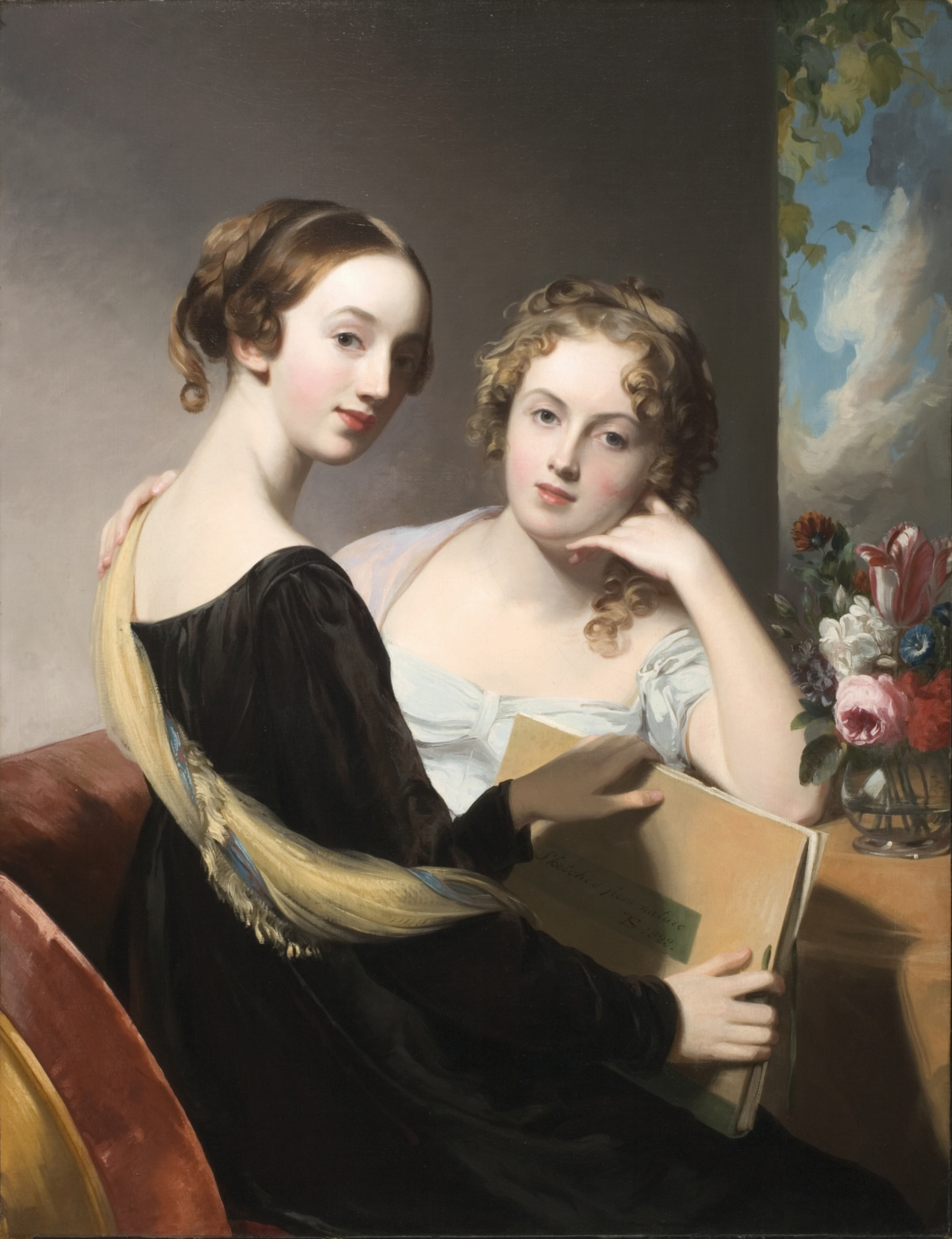
Portrait of the Misses Mary and Emily McEuen, 1823, Los Angeles County Museum of Art

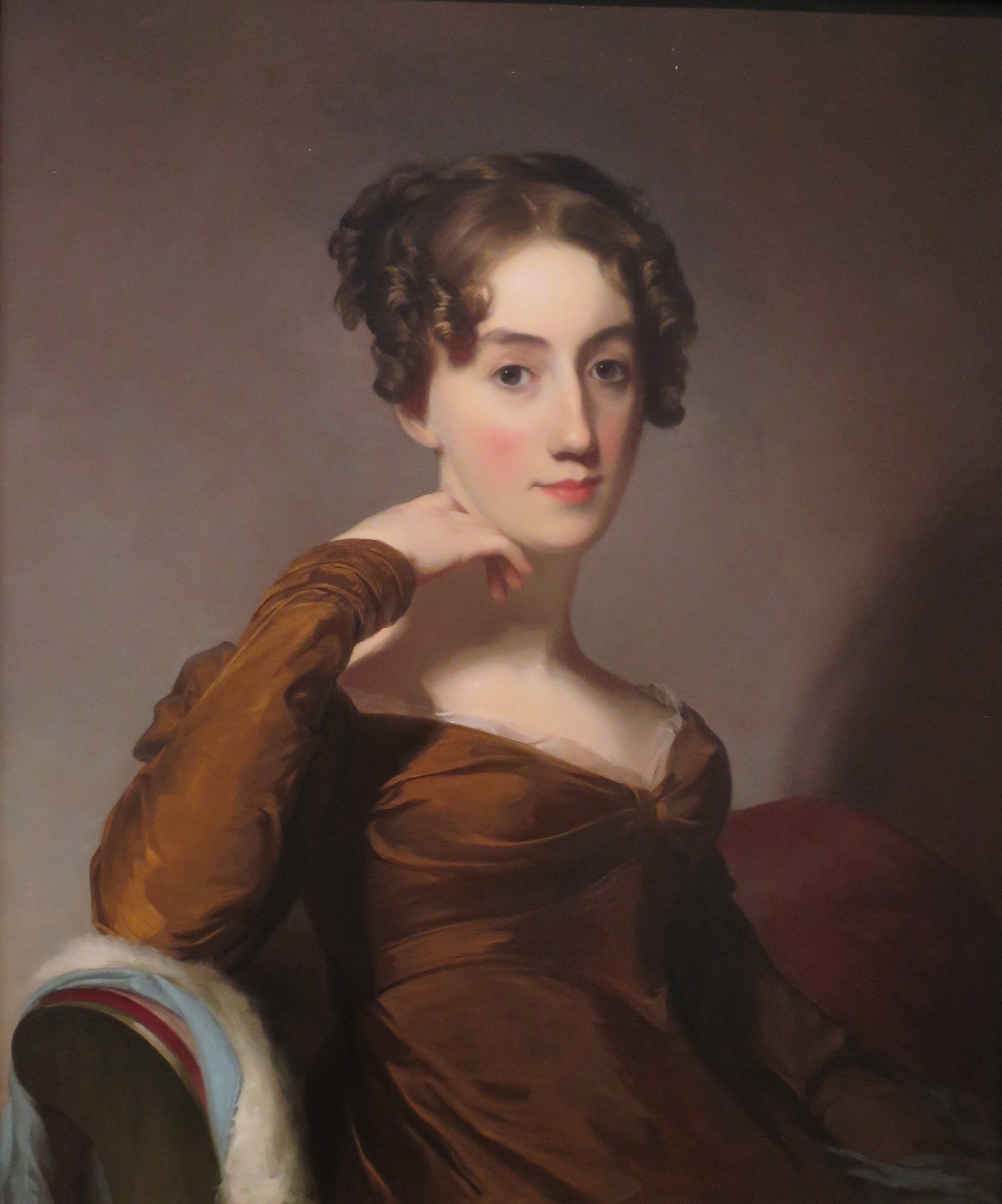
Portrait of Elizabeth McEuen Smith, 1823, oil on canvas, Honolulu Museum of Art

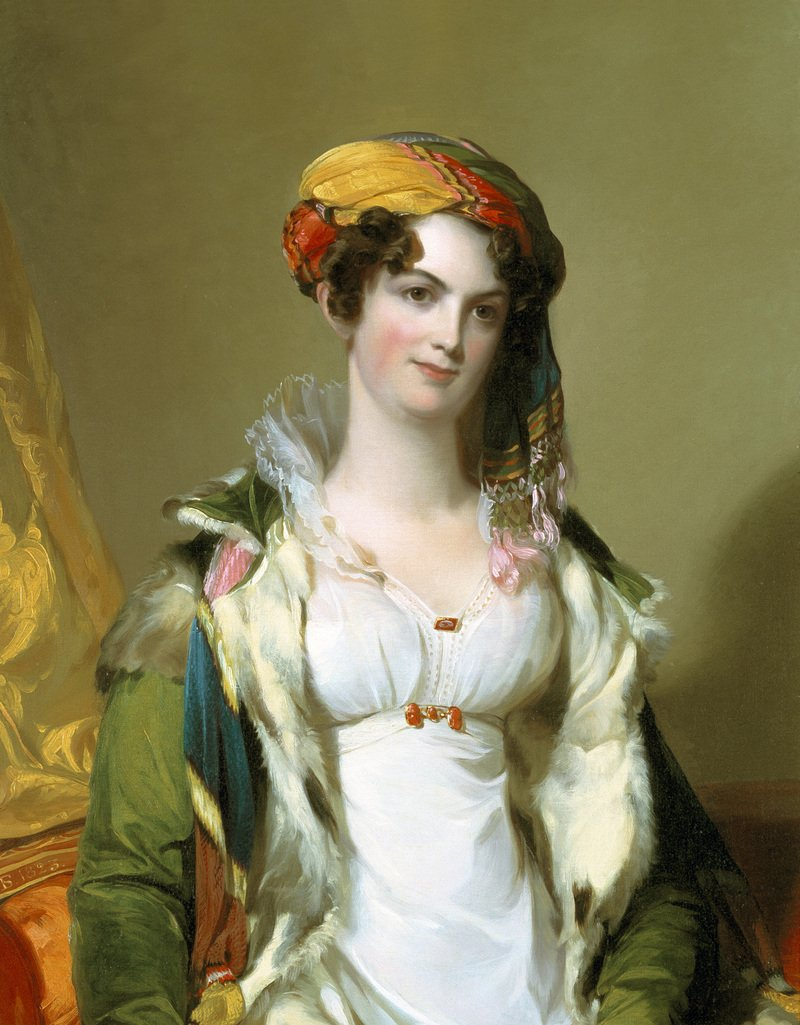
Mrs. Robert Gilmor, Jr. (Sarah Reeve Ladson), 1823

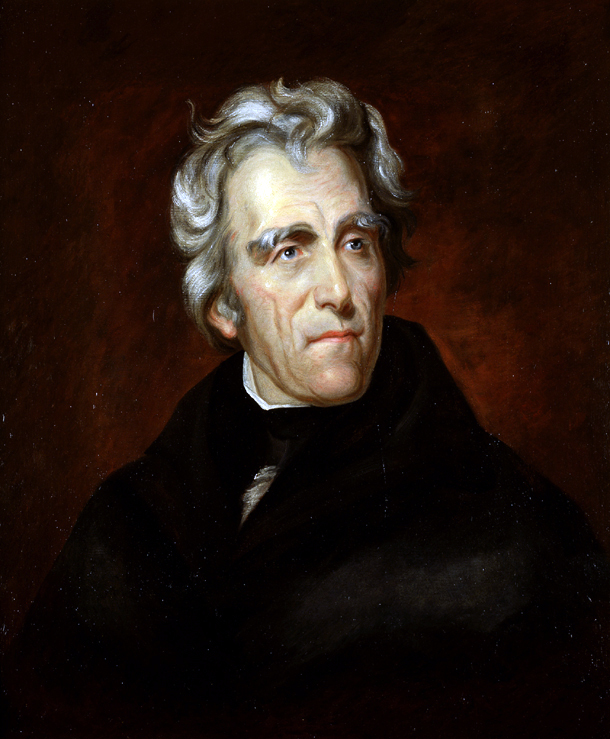
Portrait of Andrew Jackson, 1824, used for the United States twenty-dollar bill from 1928 onward

John Quincy Adams, 1824, National Portrait Gallery

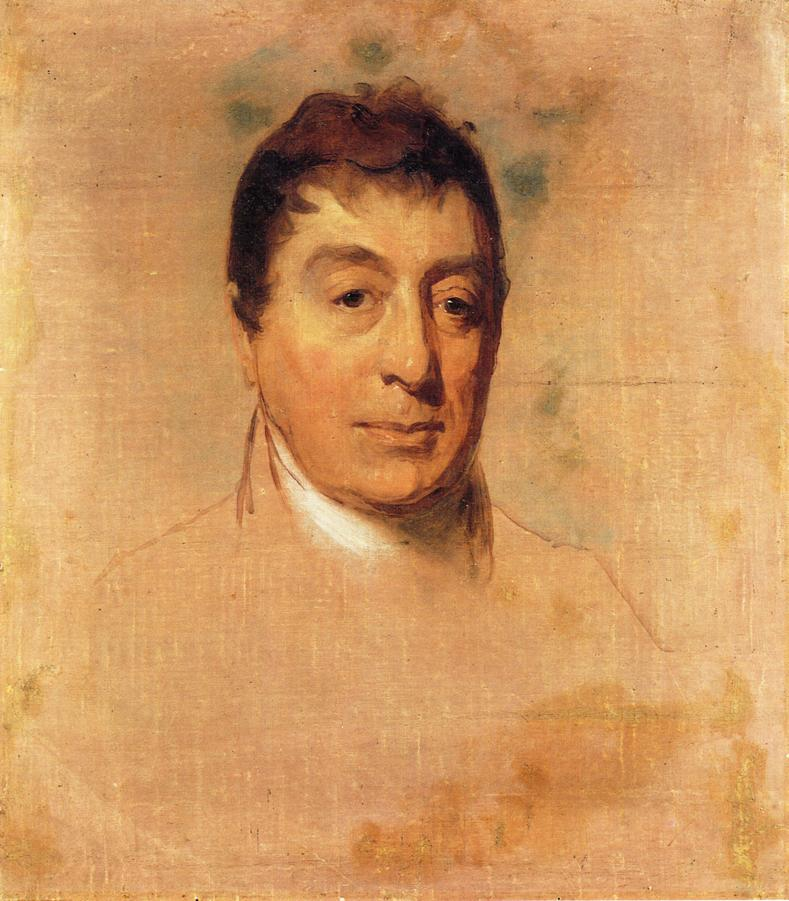
A Life Study of the Marquis de Lafayette, c. 1824–1825, oil on canvas

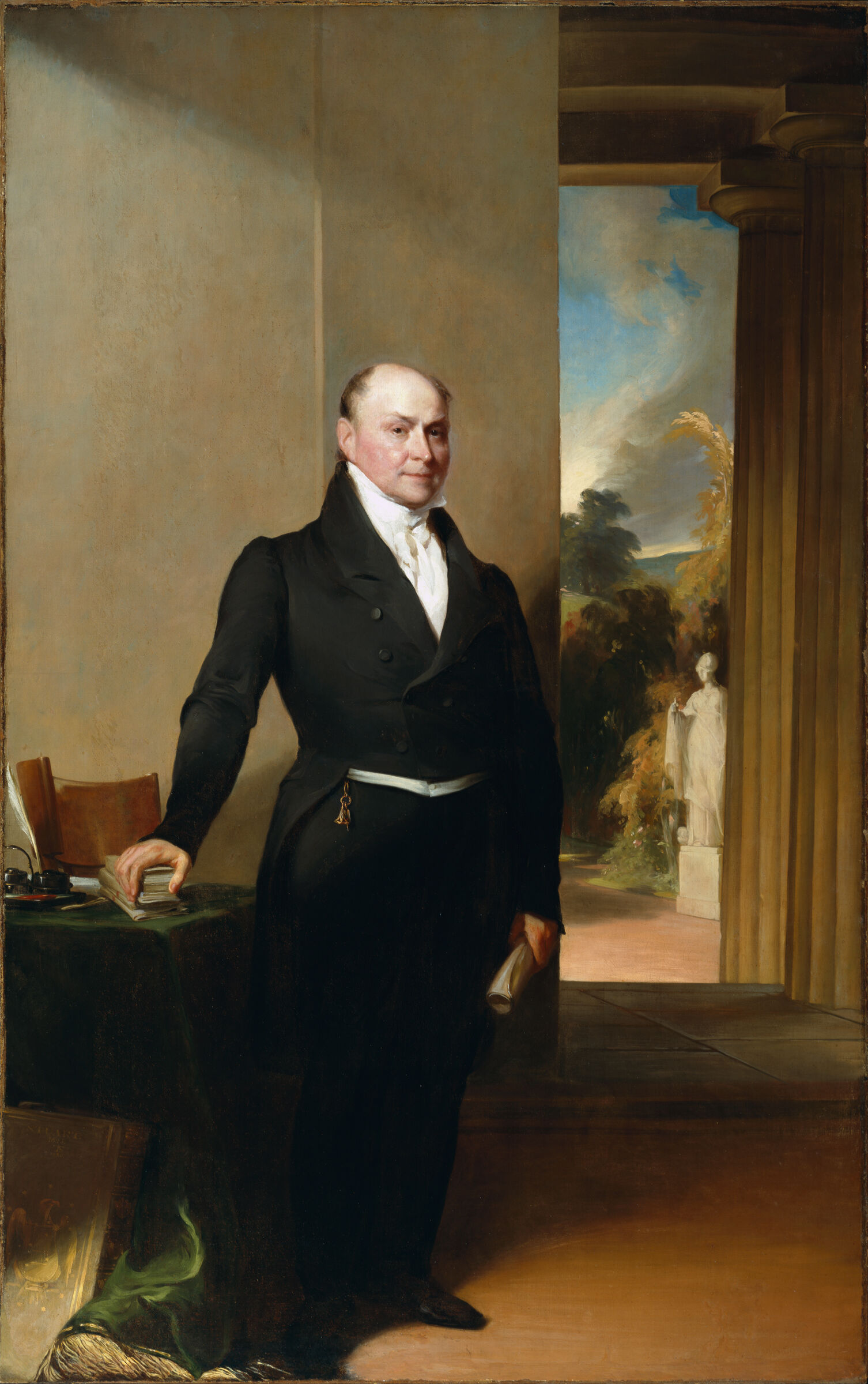
Gilbert Stuart painted John Quincy Adams' face for this 1828 portrait; Sully did all the rest (Harvard University Collection)

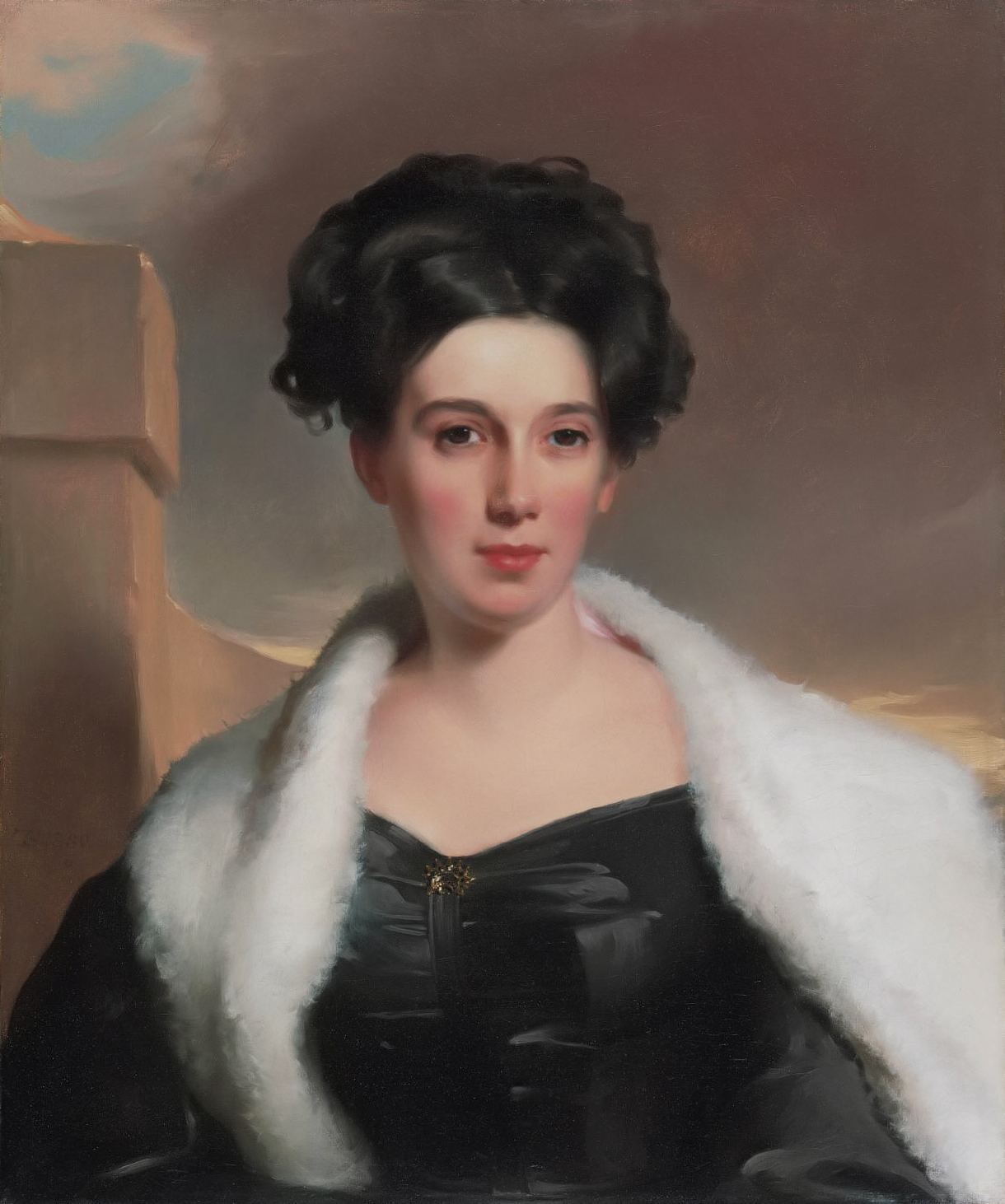
Portrait of Mary Ann Heide Norris, 1830, Philadelphia Museum of Art

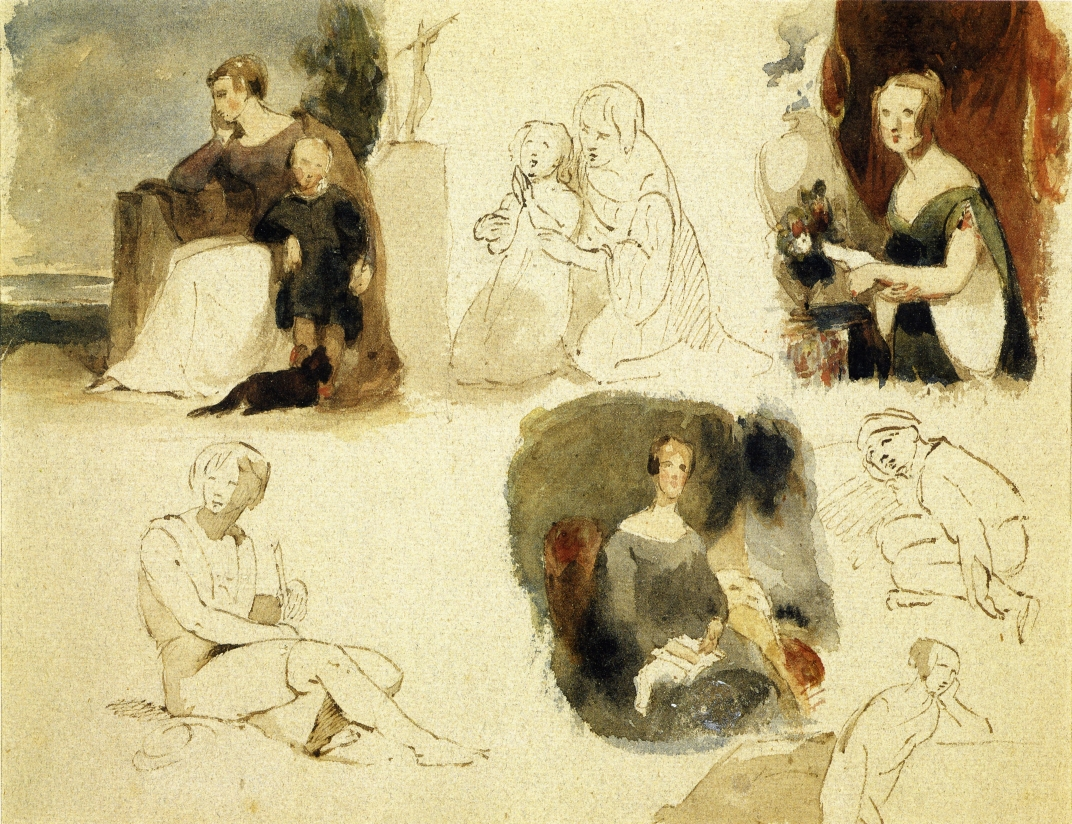
Sheet of figure studies, 1830–1839, Museum of Fine Arts, Boston

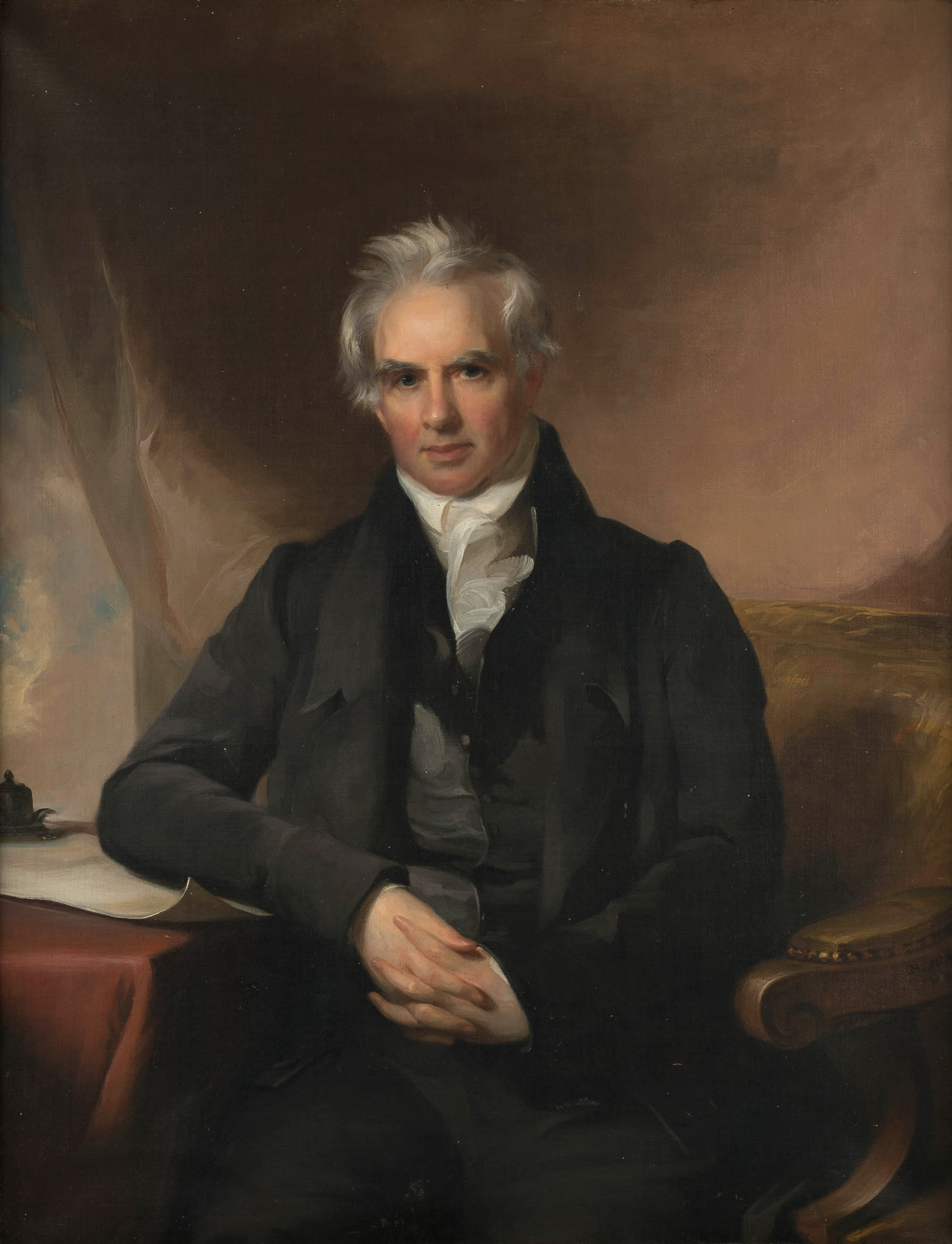
Thomas L. Winthrop, 1831, oil on canvas, Massachusetts Historical Society

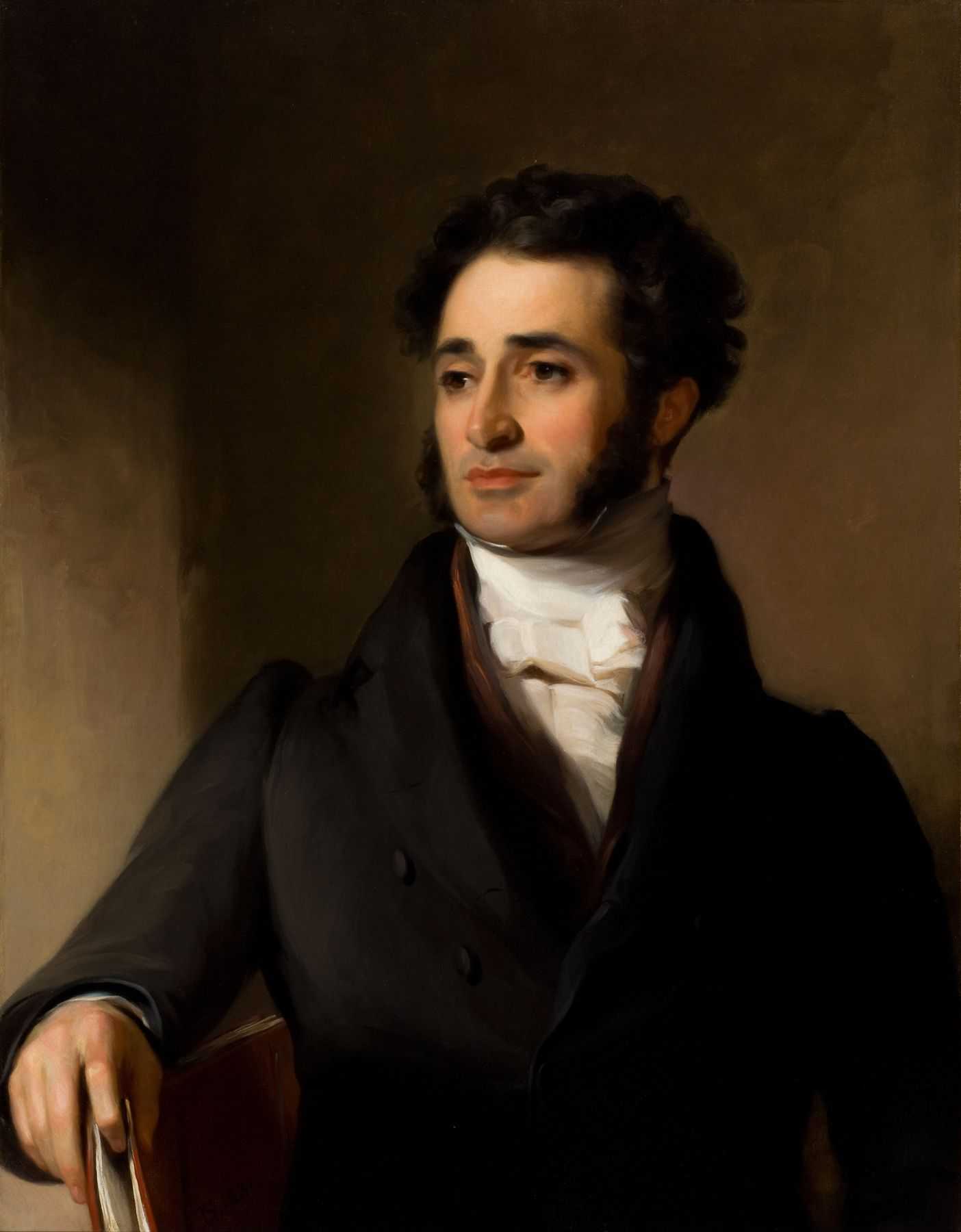
Jared Sparks, 1831, oil on canvas, Reynolda House Museum of American Art

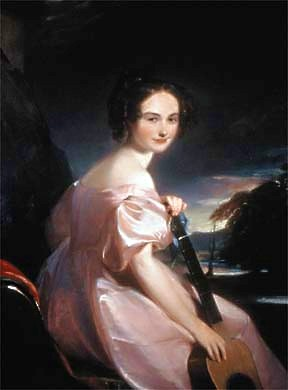
Miss Walton of Florida, 1833, oil on canvas, a portrait of Octavia Walton Le Vert

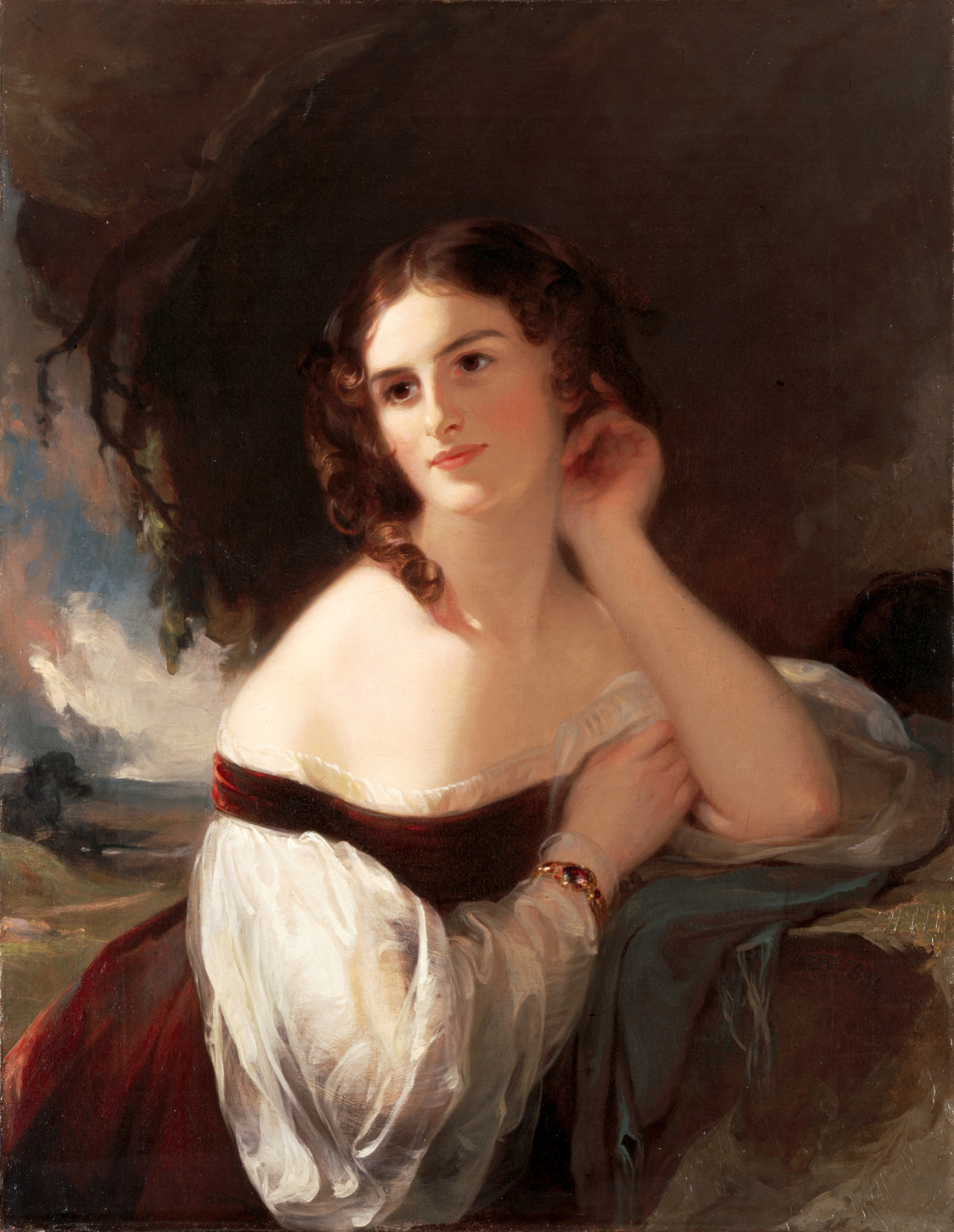
Portrait of Fanny Kemble, 1834

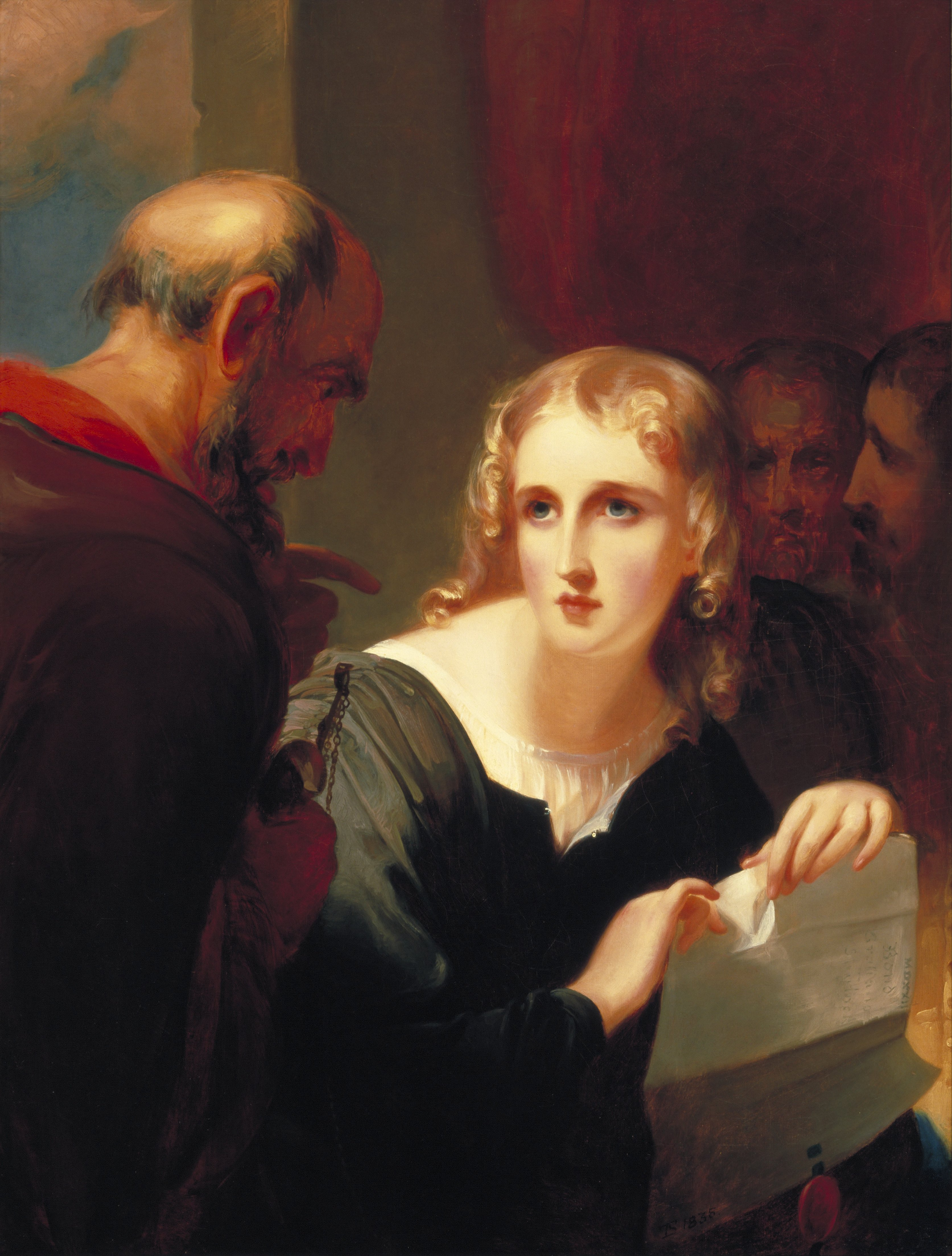
Portia and Shylock, 1835

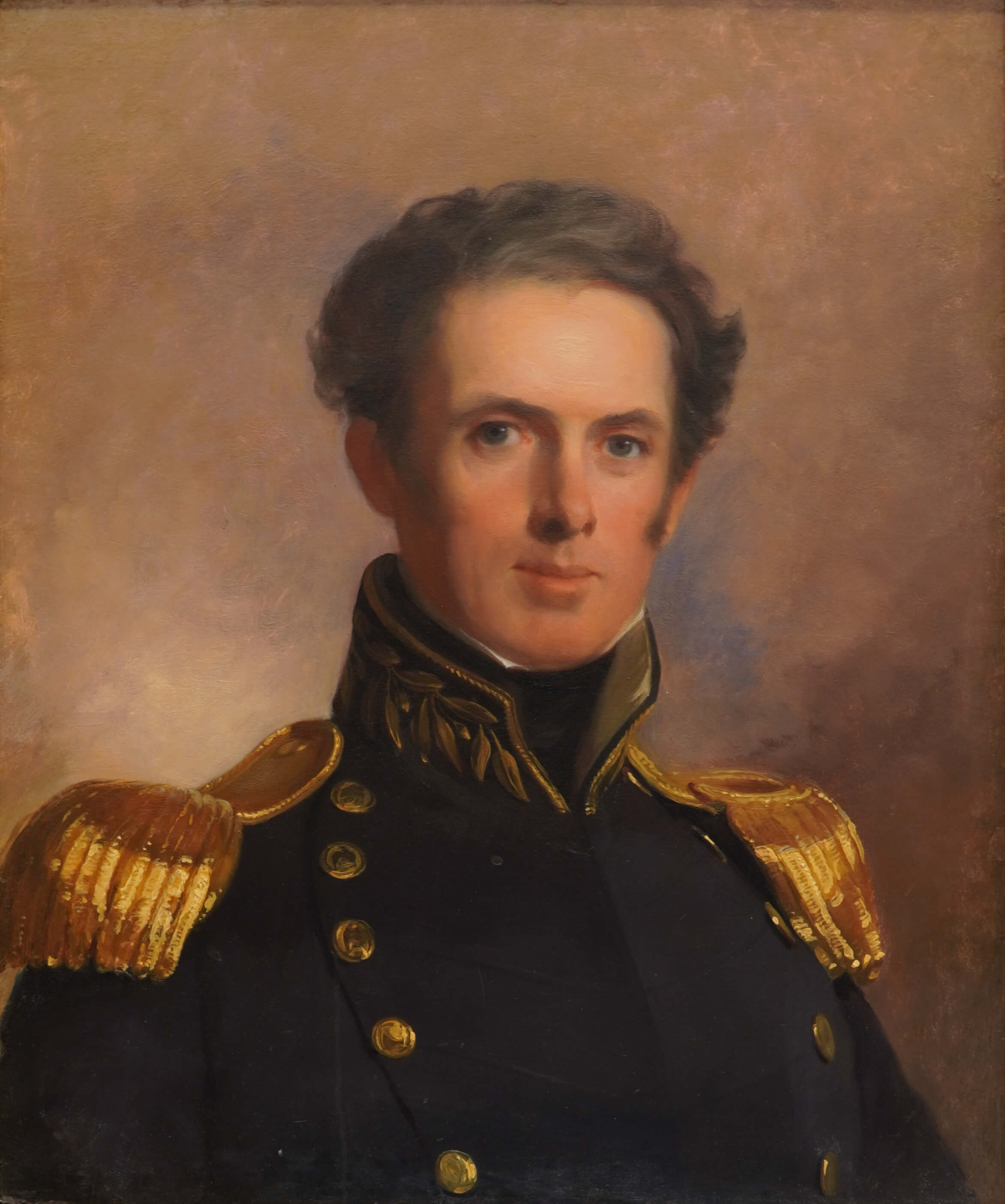
John Gwinn, 1837

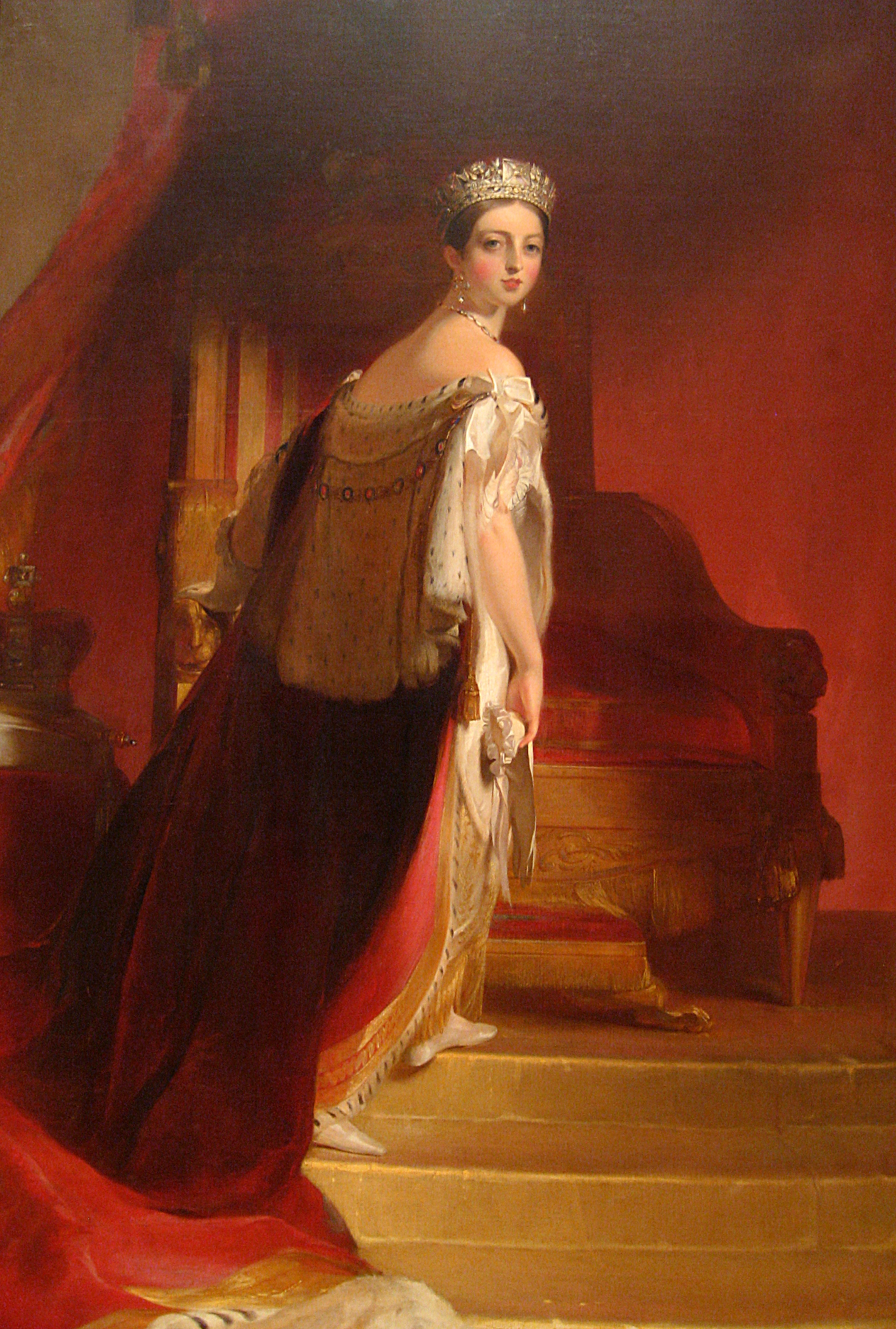
Portrait of Queen Victoria, 1838

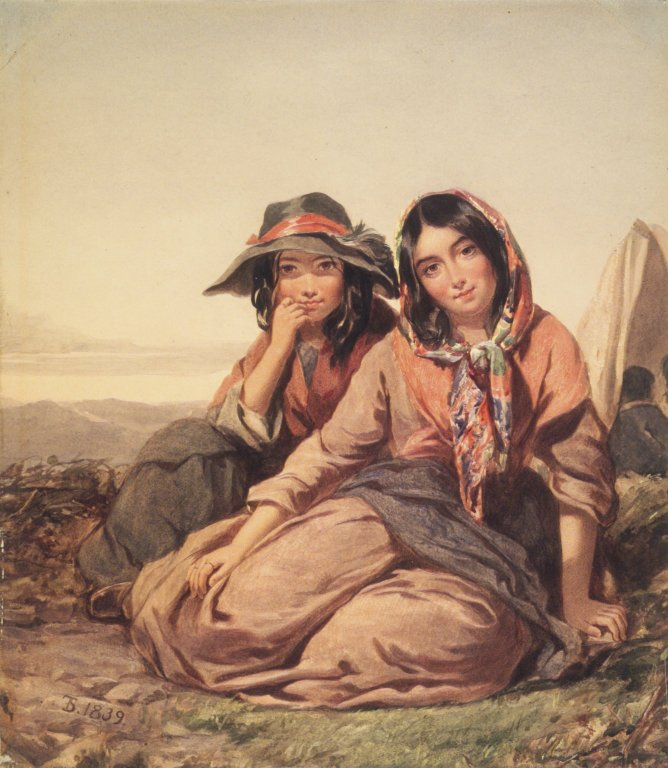
Gypsy Maidens, 1839, watercolor, Brooklyn Museum

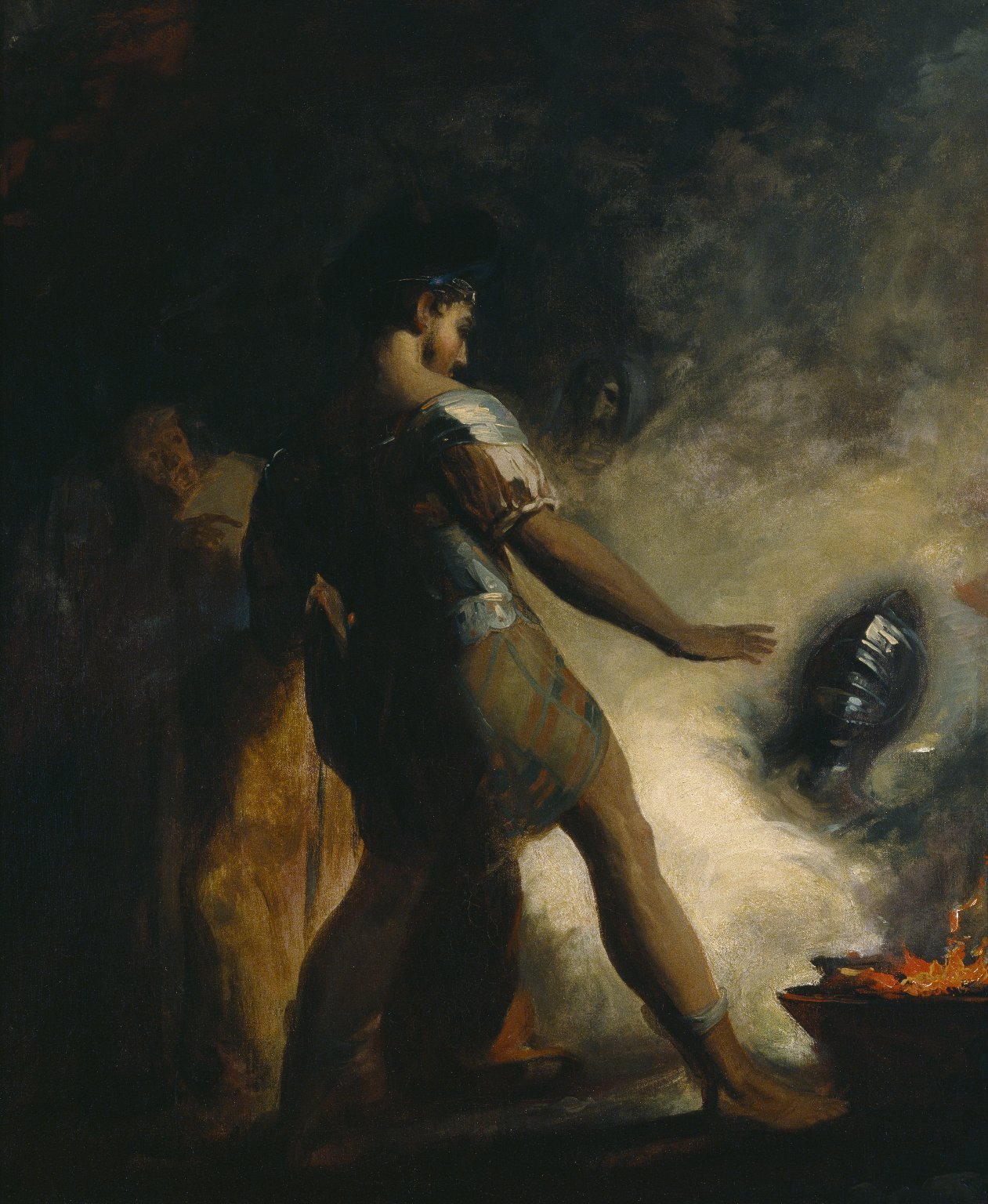
Macbeth in the witches' cave, 1840, Folger Shakespeare Library

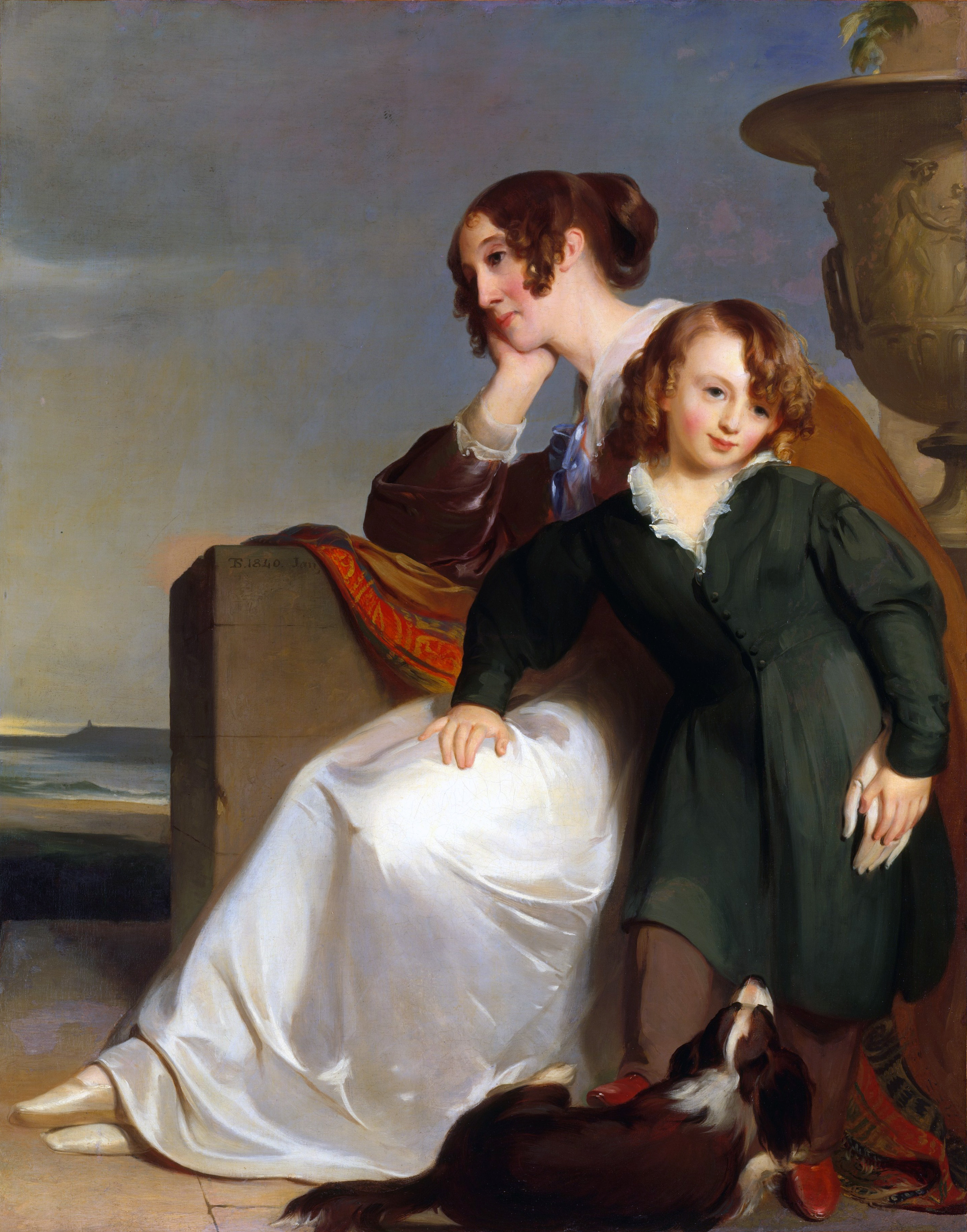
Mother and Son, 1840, oil on canvas, Metropolitan Museum of Art, New York

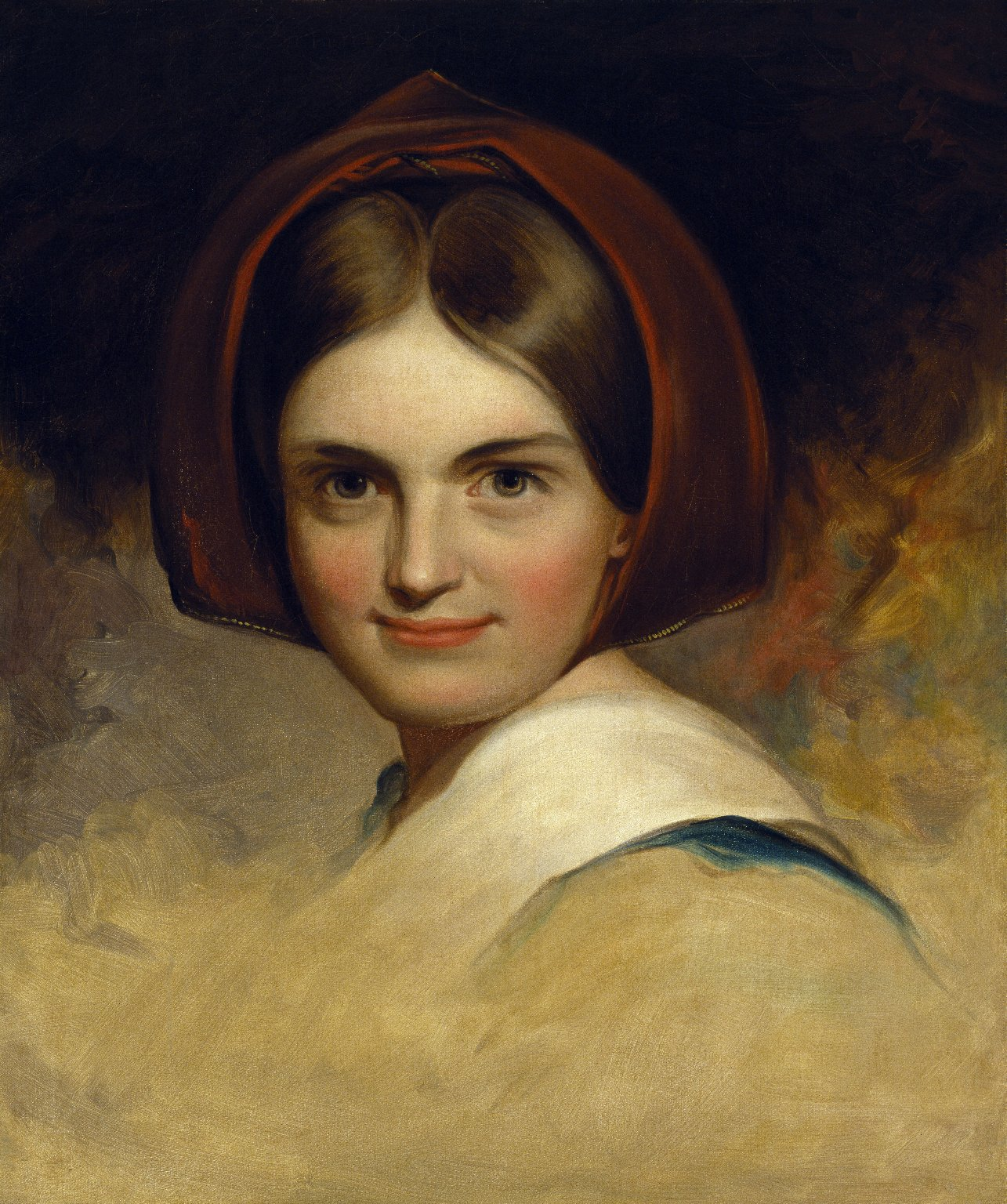
Charlotte Cushman, 1843, Folger Shakespeare Library

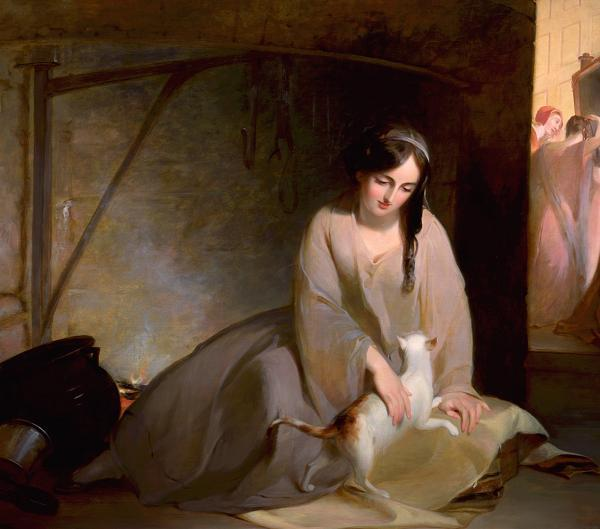
Cinderella at the Kitchen Fire, 1843, Dallas Museum of Art

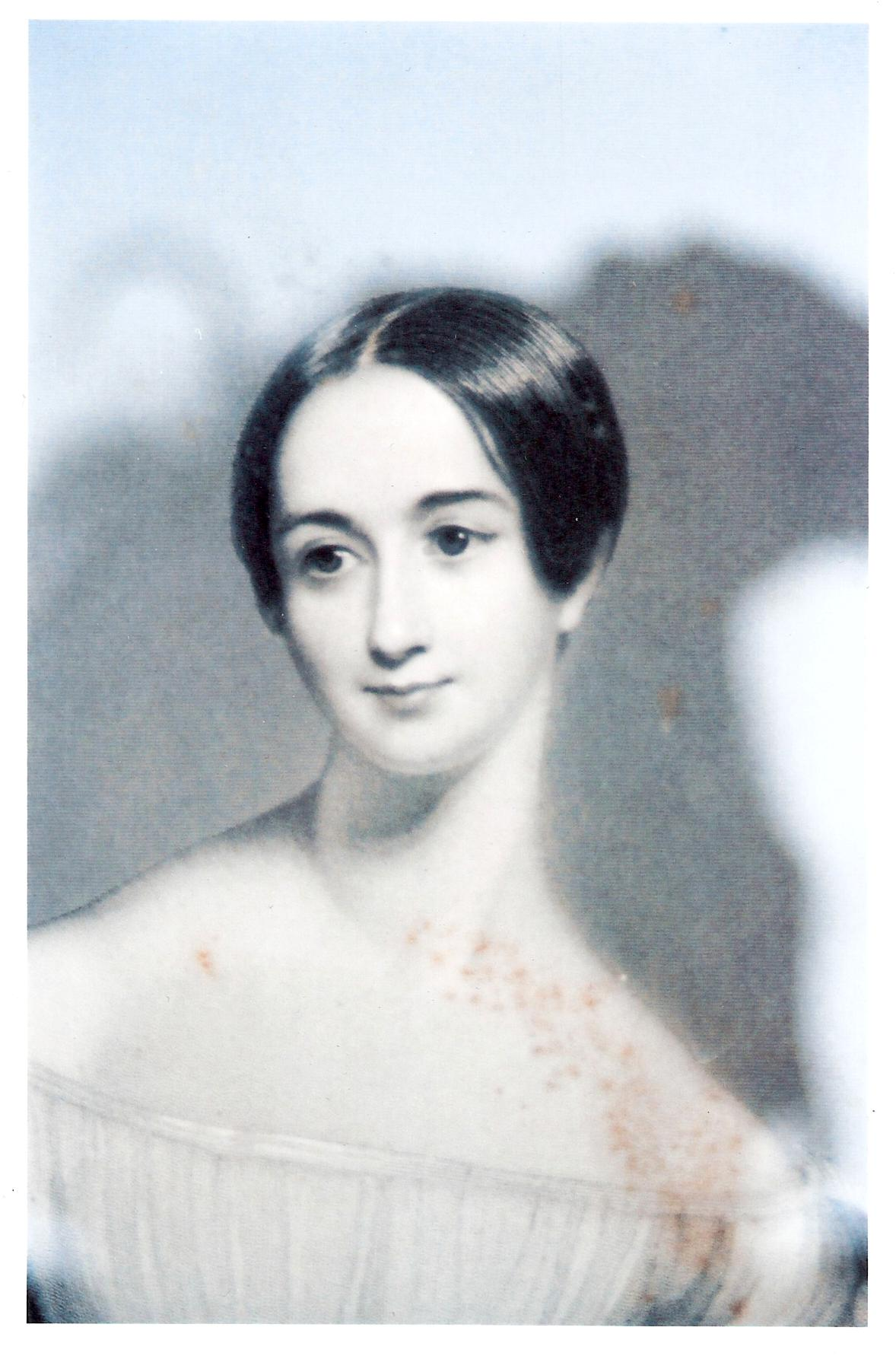
Engraving of Sully's portrait of Eliza, daughter of Joshua Bates of Boston (US), and wife to the Belgian statesman Sylvain van de Weyer

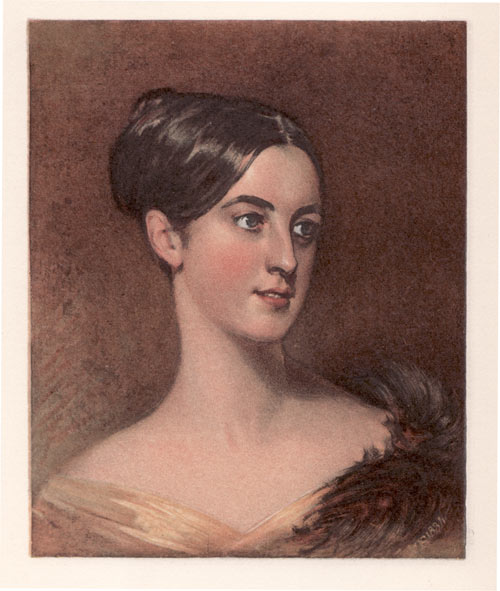
Elizabeth/Elise Wadsworth, wife of Sir Charles Murray

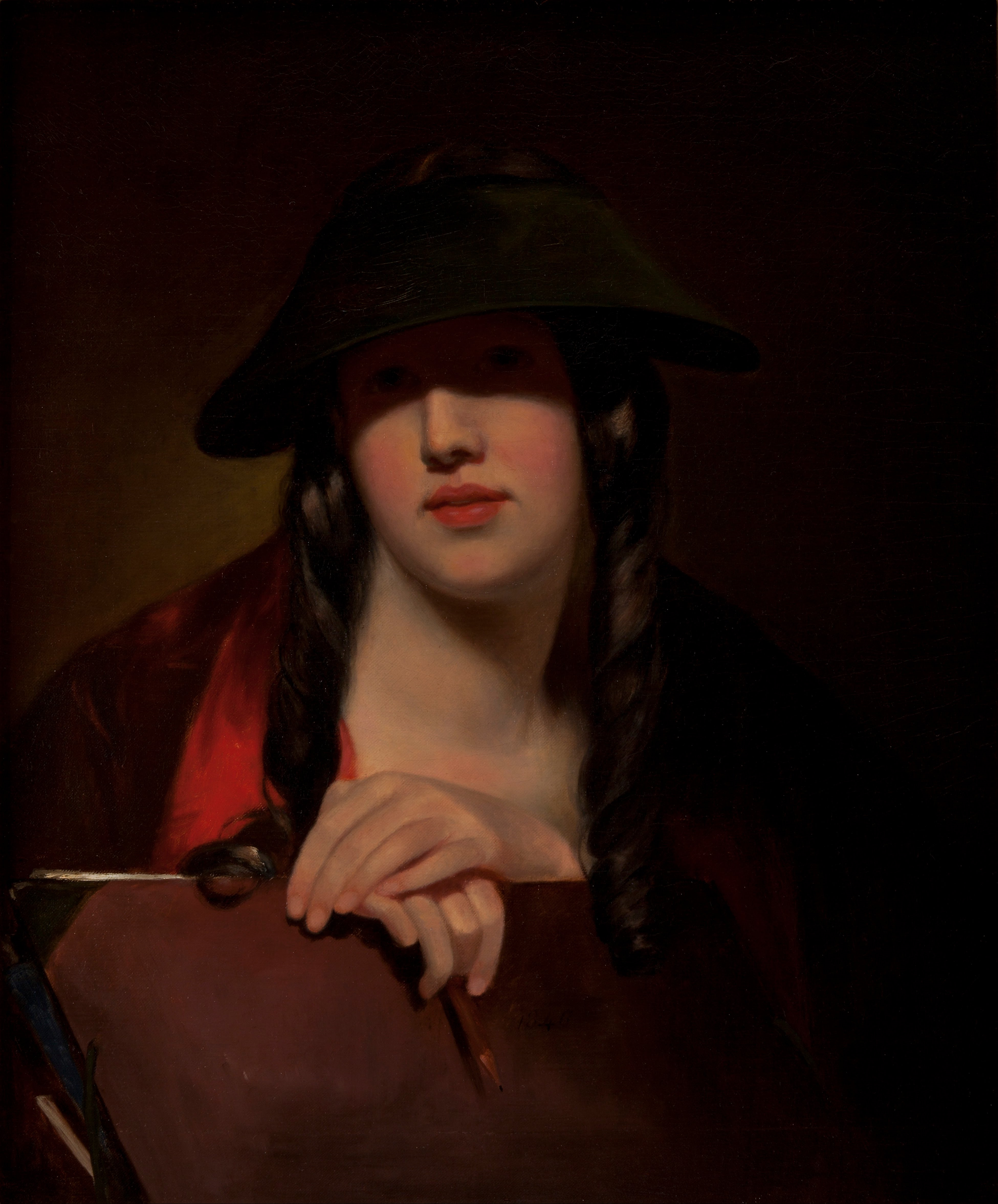
The Student, of Sully's daughter Rosalie Sully, 1848

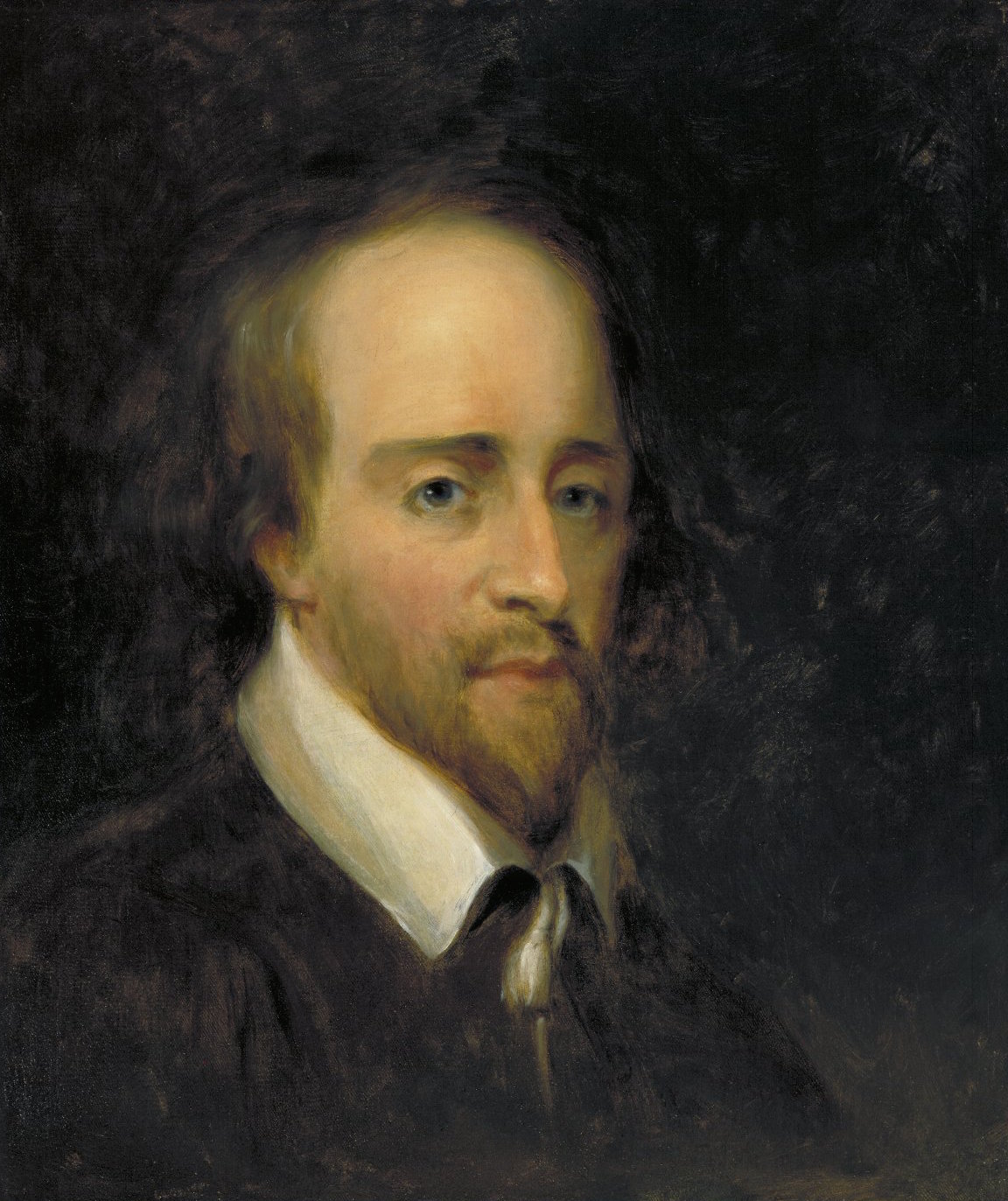
Portrait of Shakespeare, 1864, Folger Shakespeare Library

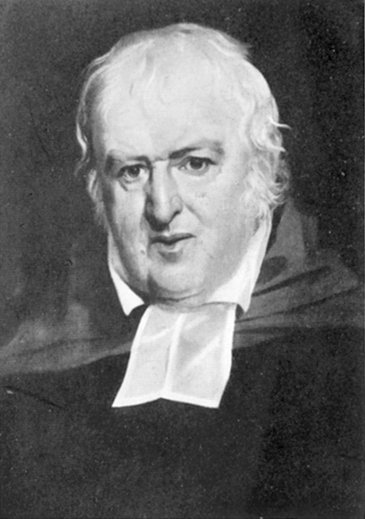
Portrait of Rev. John Andrews D.D. Provost of University of Pennsylvania

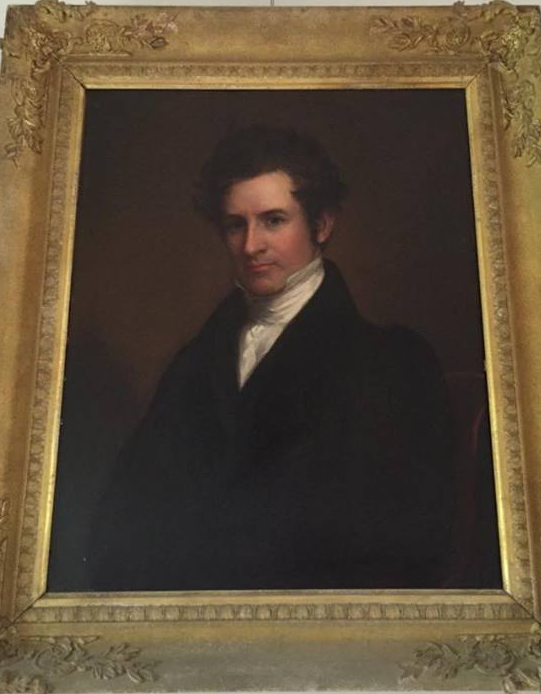
Portrait of Benjamin Ogle Tayloe American businessman, bon vivant, diplomat, and influential political activist in Washington, D.C., during the first half of the 19th century. Son of John Tayloe III

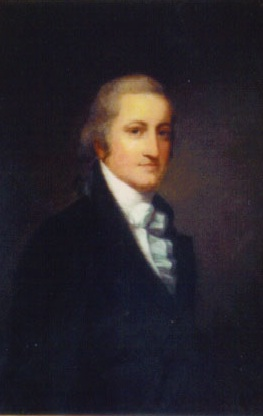
John Tayloe III, reproduction by Thomas Sully from the original by Gilbert Stuart

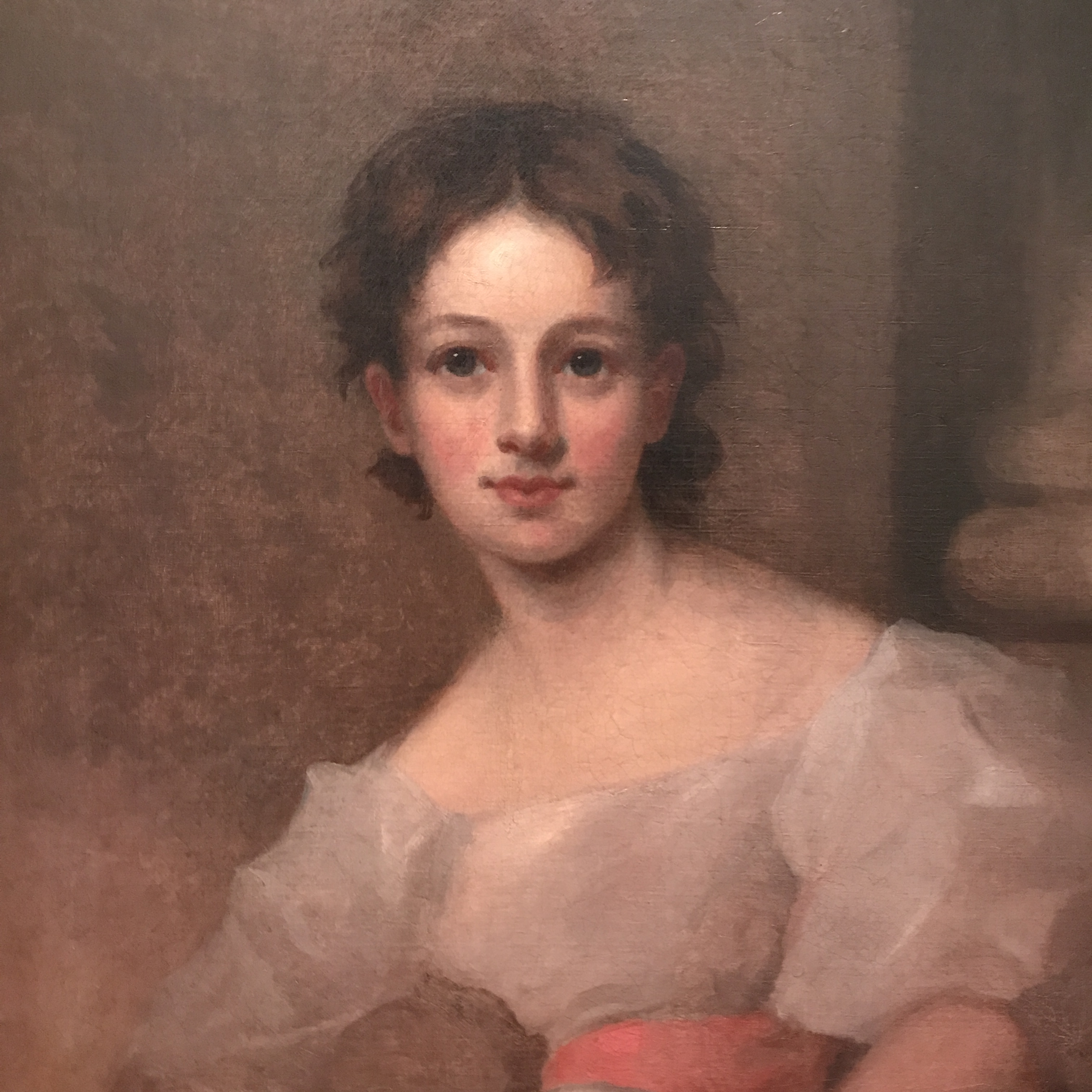
Portrait of Miss Marie Louise Parker
