= Kesher =

Kesher (Hebrew: קֶשֶׁר, lit. 'knot') is the name of various Jewish or Israeli organizations:

- KESHER, a defunct college outreach program of Reform Judaism

== See also ==
- Kesher Israel (disambiguation)
