= Benjamin Franklin High School (Philadelphia) =

Coordinates: 39.9636°N 75.1621°W

Franklin High School

Location
- 550 N Broad Street; Philadelphia, Pennsylvania 19130; United States

Information
- Type: Public
- School district: The School District of Philadelphia
- Principal: Gregory Hailey
- Staff: 40.00 (FTE)
- Enrollment: 543 (2023–2024)
- Student to teacher ratio: 13.58
- Color
- Nickname: Electrons
- Website: https://bfhs.philasd.org/

Benjamin Franklin High School is a public high school located in Philadelphia, Pennsylvania. The school, located north of Center City, is a part of the School District of Philadelphia. Franklin serves sections of North Philadelphia and Center City.

Franklin is a mostly African American school. In the late 1960s, there was a student-led effort to rename the school in honor of recently slain Malcolm X. This effort officially failed, but some students referred to the school by this name for a time.

Around 2005, Franklin began housing a charter school catering to Chinese Americans. In addition, as part of an international studies academy, it added Mandarin Chinese as a foreign language for study in 2005. The new international studies focus attracted 40 new students from the Chinatown area.

== History ==
Although housed in the 37-year-old building previously used by Central High School, Benjamin Franklin High School was dedicated on April 26, 1939. Two-thirds of the faculty and two-thirds of the student body were carried over from Central. Franklin's first principal, Dr. A. Oswald Michener, was to coordinate "the century-old tradition of Central High School with the modern spirit of scientific inquiry which Franklin represented."

Following World War II, nearly 5,000 returning veterans were provided with twelve to fourteen months of special classes at Franklin under the auspices of the Veterans Accelerated Program. In 1947, there were 1,800 veterans in classes, and graduates had enrolled in over 200 colleges and universities, including Harvard.

During the McCarthy era, Francis P. Jennings, President of the Philadelphia Teachers Union and a social studies teacher at Franklin, was suspended for alleged communist activity. Testifying before the House Un-American Activities Committee, he declared that teachers were required to sacrifice constitutional rights to qualify for employment.

Conservative economist and columnist Walter E. Williams, who graduated in 1954, was a critic of Franklin, but praised English teacher, Dr. Martin Rosenberg.

Wesley Cook, although he never graduated, was a student at Franklin. In 1969, as a fourteen-year-old, he was inspired by a Black Panther Party newspaper to become involved in that movement and was one of those who proposed changing the school's name to honor Malcolm X. Subsequently, at the suggestion of a Kenyan teacher of African studies at Franklin, he adopted a "class" African name, Mumia, to which, following the birth of a son, he later added Abu-Jamal. As Mumia Abu-Jamal, he was convicted of murdering a police officer and while in prison became well known as an author.

Over a period of many years, Franklin athletes have had successful careers. George Nock, Wendell Tucker, and J. T. Turner played for the National Football League, and Fred Carter, Paul Graham, Pooh Richardson, and Randy Woods played for the National Basketball Association. Bryant Jennings is a heavyweight championship boxer.

In September 1979 the school opened up to the first 9th graders and females. The class of 1979–1980 graduated its first and only female, Iris Chase, who wore a white and red robe instead of a blue and gold one.

Franklin was one of the first high schools in Philadelphia serving the African American community. By the late 1980s the school had become run down and plagued with violence. Conditions at Franklin worsened when the School District of Philadelphia cut the school's funding due to many economic problems in the area.

Dropouts and transfers were common. There were 164 freshmen enrolled in 1986, and another 71 entered the following fall, but only 181 graduated in 1990, a loss of 22 percent.

In 2007, a $4 million renovation was made. The renovations included the gymnasium, auditorium and classrooms, and front entrance facade, as well as the replacement of doors and windows. In order to create new classroom space, a small rooftop building addition was constructed, with the addition of new steel dunnage and air handling units.

In 2011, James Brunson Lauren Murphy-Sands and Larry Conlan started a rugby team. Their story was made into a 2019 film called The Nomads.

In January 2016 a fight occurred in a hallway, and an individual fired a gun. Nobody was injured by the gunfire, and one student was arrested.

== Zoned neighborhoods ==
Franklin serves several areas, including the Fairmount, Spring Garden, the section of Northern Liberties south of Poplar Street, and portions of Center City, including Chinatown, Old City, Rittenhouse Square, Logan Square, and Society Hill.

In 2005 Chinatown was zoned to Franklin. Franklin currently serves Harrison Plaza, Richard Allen Housing Projects and Francisville.

== Feeder patterns ==
Feeder K–8 schools include:

- Bache-Martin
- Dunbar
- Greenfield
- General Philip Kearny
- McCall
- Meade
- Morris
- Spring Garden
- Laura Wheeler Waring

Former feeder K–8 schools include:

- Ferguson
- Harrison
- Hartranft

== Notable alumni ==
- Mumia Abu-Jamal, political activist and journalist convicted of murdering Philadelphia police officer Daniel Faulkner
- Bootsie Barnes, jazz saxophonist
- Fred Carter, NBA shooting guard (1969–1977)
- Major Coxson, Philadelphia drug kingpin in the early-1970s
- Paul Graham, NBA shooting guard (1991–1994)
- Bryant Jennings, boxer
- Brad Lomax, disability rights activist
- George Nock, NFL running back (1969–1972)
- Pooh Richardson, NBA point guard (1989–1999)
- Nicodemo Scarfo, boss of the Philadelphia Crime Family
- Wendell Tucker, NFL flanker and wide receiver (1967–1970)
- J.T. Turner, NFL right guard (1977–1984)
- Walter E. Williams, economist and professor
- Randy Woods, NBA point guard (1992–1996)
