= George A. McCall School =

General George A. McCall School
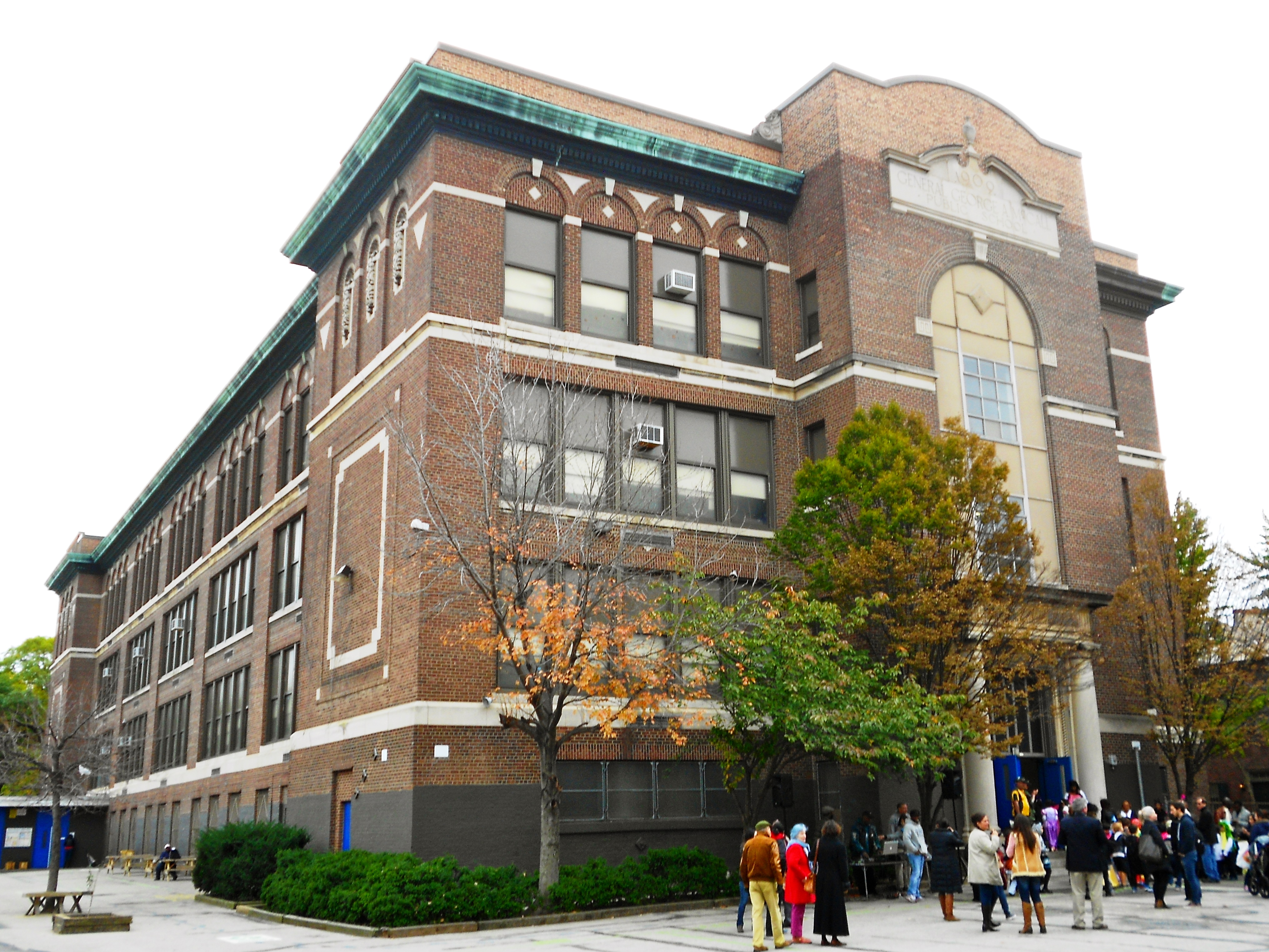

Location
- United States
- Coordinates: 39.944583°N 75.152595°W

Information
- Type: K-8 school
- Established: 1911
- School district: School District of Philadelphia
- Principal: Antoinette Powell
- Teaching staff: 45
- Grades: K-8th
- Website: mccall.philasd.org

General George A. McCall School is a public K–8 school in the Society Hill section of Center City, Philadelphia. The McCall School, located at 325 S. 7th Street, serves Society Hill, Chinatown, and Old City. The school, a part of the School District of Philadelphia, is named after George A. McCall. On September 28, 2017, McCall was named a National Blue Ribbon School.

== History ==
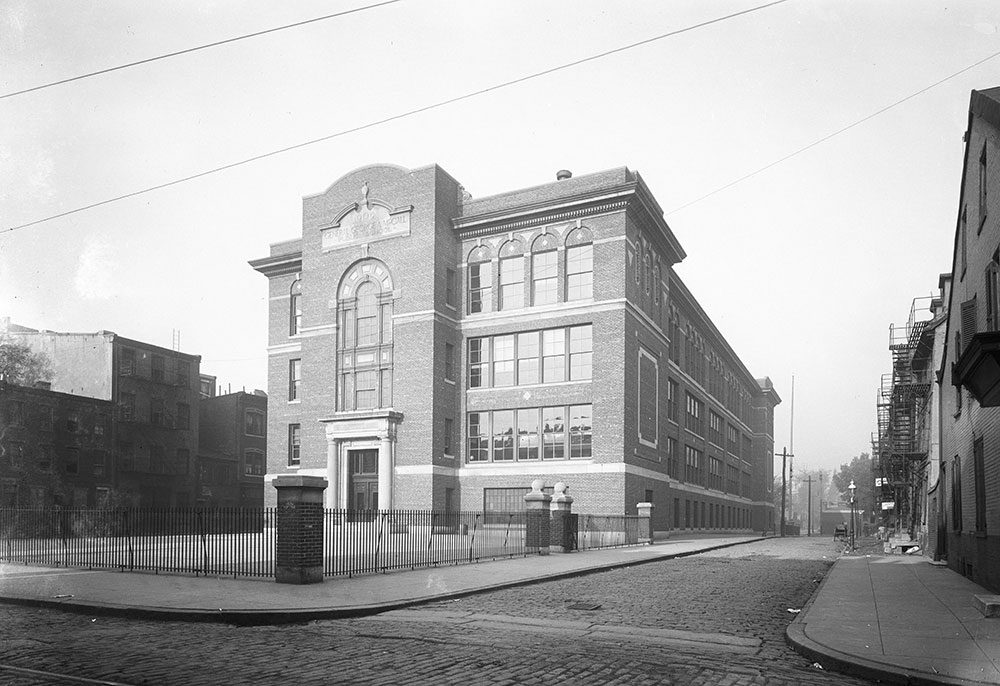
McCall Public School, September 24, 1913

The official opening of McCall occurred in February 1911; the construction of the building had been awarded on October 26, 1909. It relieved Horace Binney School, and the first principal of McCall, Louis Nusbaum, was previously Binney's principal.

McCall, in the 1920s and 1930s, was known for its "Continuation School", a program for students aged 14 and up, until age 16, where they attend school once per week while finding work. At the time compulsory school attendance was until age 14.

In the 1950s McCall introduced a program of English as a second language for students, the first of its kind offered by a U.S. public school. In 1953 the students in its ESL program numbered over 200 and originated from over 20 countries.

Black Enterprise stated that circa 1964 McCall "was mostly Black, neglected and hardly deserved to be called an institution of learning." This reflected the state of the neighborhood which the same magazine described back then as "one of the city's most depressing slums". Around that period wealthier residents began sending their children to other schools. By 1976 the neighborhood gentrified and became heavily white.

In the mid-1960s it received an auditorium and gymnasium, and prior to 1976 it received a renovation. By then the neighborhood became mostly white and wealthy. By 1976 the school became one of the highest-ranked schools in Philadelphia; the student body of McCall reflected the wealthier and white majority demographics. According to Black Enterprise, the demographic and academic transformation of McCall was a demonstration of the phrase "The better the neighborhood, the better the schools."

By September 1998 the school, which had 650 students, established a bilingual English-Chinese program to serve Chinese American students, and that month it began hiring teachers fluent in both languages to teach core subjects. At the time 25% of the students were Chinese, and the number of Chinese students had doubled in the previous two-year period. Russell Scott Smith of Edutopia wrote that in 2004, compared with other schools in Philadelphia, "McCall already had a fairly good reputation for academic rigor and safety" and that by 2009 it had improved even more. In 2012 Kristen A. Graham of The Philadelphia Inquirer stated that McCall was one of "the district's stronger neighborhood schools".

== Operations ==
The school's parent–teacher association is the McCall Home and School Association.

== Student body ==
As of 2009 the racial percentages of McCall's student body were 55% Asian, 27% black, 11% white, 4% from other racial backgrounds, and 1.7% Hispanic and Latino. In 2012 about 50% of the student body was below the poverty line.

As of 2005 most Chinatown residents who are unable to afford tuition to send their children to private school send their children to McCall.

In 1975, the student enrollment was 713, with white students being 49%, black students being 45%, and Asian students being 6%.

== Campus ==
In 1976 Black Enterprise stated that there is more emphasis on saving historical buildings in Philadelphia compared to other major American cities; it stated that "in any other large American city it would probably have been torn down by now."

The school received a "cybrary" in 2007—a library facility with 22 computers and materials in Mandarin Chinese financed by fundraisers and bake sales.

== School uniforms ==
Its mandatory school uniform policy went into effect in 2001 when the school district required all schools to have strict dress codes.

== Transportation ==
In 1993 the school district began a school bus route between Chinatown and McCall. The school is 1.4 miles (2.3 km) away from the furthest point of Chinatown. The district was not required to install the route, but parents advocated for the route because they believed that traffic at Market Street and Washington Square endangered their children. When the district proposed to eliminate the route in 1994, parents complained.

== Feeder patterns ==
All persons zoned to McCall are also zoned to Benjamin Franklin High School. Previously, Furness High School was the zoned high school for McCall zone residents.

== Notes ==
- Some content originated from Society Hill
