= St. Peter's School, Philadelphia =

St. Peter's School

Location
- 319 Lombard Street; Philadelphia, Pennsylvania 19147; United States; 39.94262133063725°N 75.14816959571023°W

Information
- Type: Private School
- Established: 1834; 192 years ago
- Head of school: Matt Evans
- Faculty: 30
- Grades: ECE + K-8
- Enrollment: 158
- Student to teacher ratio: 5:1
- Campus type: Urban
- Colors: Garnet and Grey
- Mascot: Cardinal
- Newspaper: The Independent
- Website: www.st-peters-school.org

St. Peter's School is an independent, coeducational, nonsectarian day school for children ages 3–14. Founded in 1834, it is located in the Society Hill neighborhood of Philadelphia, Pennsylvania.

== History ==
The school was originally associated with St. Peter's Church, which is adjacent to it. When St. Peter's Church separated from Christ Church in 1832, a home was purchased at 319 Lombard Street for Sunday School classes. In 1834, Bishop White founded a Day School as an adjunct of the church. "Girls and small boys" were educated in spelling, reading, writing, arithmetic, geography and sewing for a tuition set at twelve and a half cents per week. The school initially enrolled 19 students but grew quickly, to 55 just one year later. In 1839, the building underwent a major renovation and some additions to provide additional space. In 1839, Samuel and Elizabeth Welsh deeded an adjacent building (321 Lombard Street) to St. Peter's; over time, the church acquired additional lots (317-323 Lombard Street), which together formed the campus of the present school.

=== Choir School years ===
By the turn of the century, attendance at the parish school had dropped considerably: the public school system was now offering education to all at no cost, and the City of Philadelphia had built a new school, the George M. Wharton Public School, at 3rd and Lombard in 1869. In early 1903, the church organist, Ernest Felix Potter, suggested to convert the school to a choir school, which would offer not only a strong academic education but also intensive musical instruction not available in the public or private school systems. Potter's proposal was approved, and the new St. Peter’s Choir School for Boys opened on Sept. 15, 1903, with Potter as the first headmaster and choirmaster. There were 30 boys from third to eighth grade attending. In 1916, Dr. Harold Wells Gilbert was appointed choirmaster; he became headmaster of the choir school in 1919. Under his direction, the choir became widely known; it produced several RCA Victor recordings, sang and toured with the Philadelphia Orchestra, and performed in Carnegie Hall; some of its concerts were broadcast nationally. Gilbert led the school for the following 45 years, until his retirement in 1960.

=== Caroline Seamans years ===
Under the leadership of Gilbert's successor, Reverend Joseph Koci, Jr., the school began a transformation from a choir school to an independent school. It first became the St. Peter’s School for Boys, but turned coeducational shortly afterwards and was renamed to St. Peter's School. The school now offered grades 3 through 9; Kindergarten and first grades were added the following year. The school completed the transformation by legally separating from the church in 1969 and became an independent school, but continued to lease its building from the church for the next 47 years, until purchasing it in 2016.

In 1967, Caroline E. Seamans was appointed by the vestry as the first full-time Head of School. At the time, the school had about 90 students but was facing significant challenges, including an aging building and a small staff. Seamans initiated major repairs, including a $75,000 investment in structural renovations. Enrollment increased dramatically, to 215 students in 1973. Renovations continued, including a new stair tower in 1975 and a playground in 1976; the school also formed a partnership with the Friends of Old Pine Church to raise funds and help build the Old Pine Community Center, which is located next door. The Center opened in 1977 and provided access to additional classroom space as well as a gym, enabling the school to convert its existing gym on the third floor to a library and extra classrooms. 1983 saw the completion of a new wing, later named the Caroline E. Seamans Wing, which today contains the preschool and prekindergarten classrooms. Seamans continued to lead the school until 1991.

=== Recent years ===
Seamans was succeeded by David K. Murray, and, two years later, by Melissa Lowe Vosburgh, who had originally started at the school as an English teacher and continued to lead the school until 2000. David J. Costello then served as Head of School until 2012, and Shawn Kelly until 2018, when she was succeeded by the current Head of School, Matt Evans.

== Campus ==
St. Peter's School is in Philadelphia's Society Hill neighborhood; it occupies the southern half of the block between 3rd and 4th Street, and Pine and Lombard Street. The main building, at 319 Lombard Street, is in the Gothic Revival style and is a part of the Society Hill Historic District. Directly adjacent to the north is St. Peter's Church with its historic church yard, including several Osage orange trees that were grown from seeds sent back from the Lewis and Clark Expedition. The church continues to collaborate with the school and hosts certain events, such as the school's annual Celebration of Light and graduation. The School's athletic facilities, as well as several classrooms for special classes, are located in Old Pine Community Center, just across 4th Street. A green space near 4th Street houses a playground and organic gardens.

== Student Life ==
Today, the School is organized into three divisions: the Early Childhood Division, which includes preschool, prekindergarten, and kindergarten classes; the Lower School, which consists of grades 1 through 4, and the Upper School, which continues to grade 8. Upon entering the Lower School, students are assigned to one of the two school colors, Garnet or Grey, at the annual Calling of the Colors. The two colors compete regularly throughout the year, e.g., at athletic events.

Since 1964, the School has organized an annual Harvest Festival in the fall, with activities for students and families. Originally conceived as a way to kindle interest in the school, the festival has become a tradition that continues to this day. In spring, the School hosts a May Day celebration with performances and maypole dances.
