= Society Hill =

Neighborhood in Philadelphia, Pennsylvania

- Society Hill Historic District
- U.S. National Register of Historic Places
- U.S. Historic district
- Philadelphia Register of Historic Places
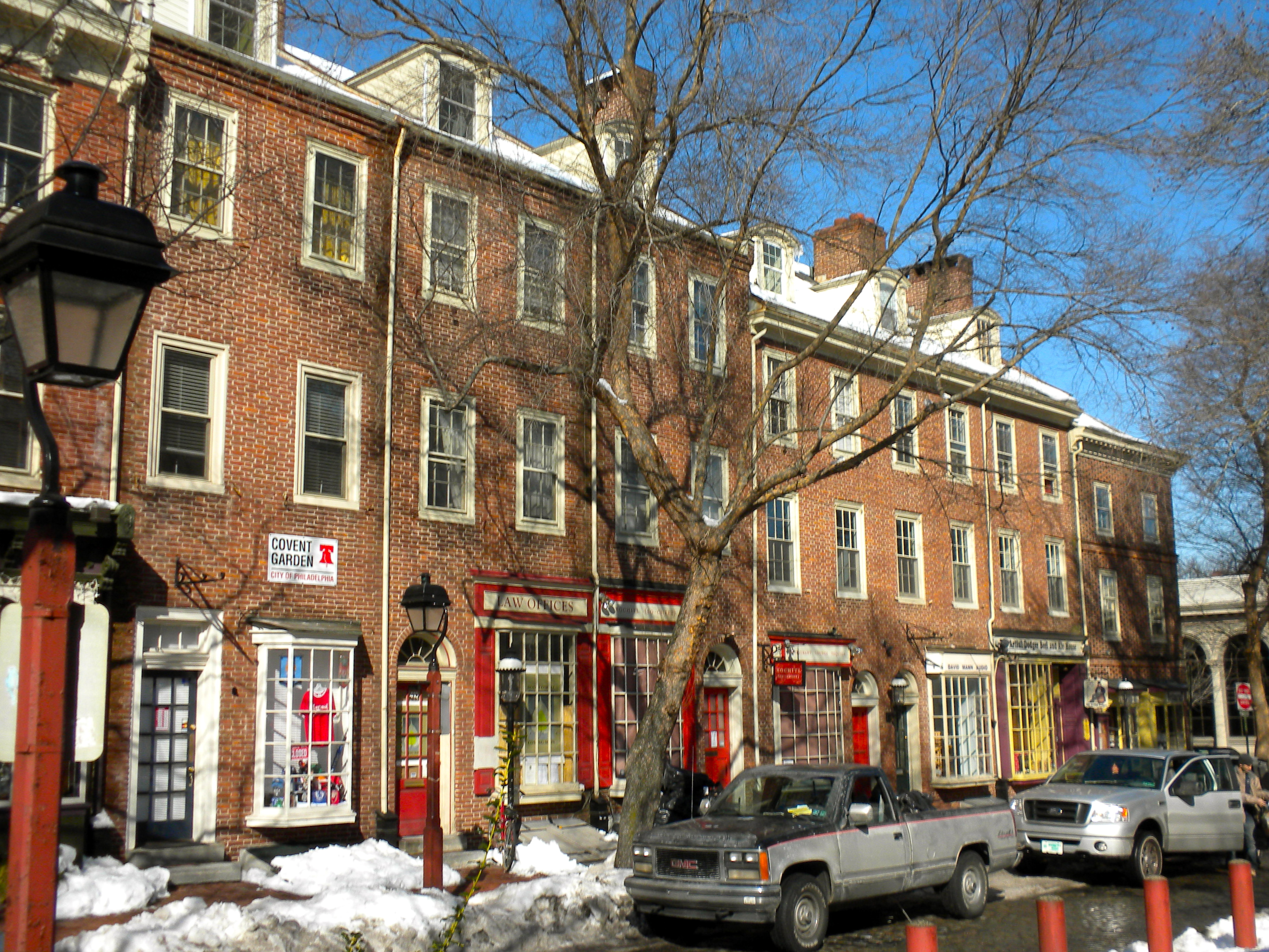
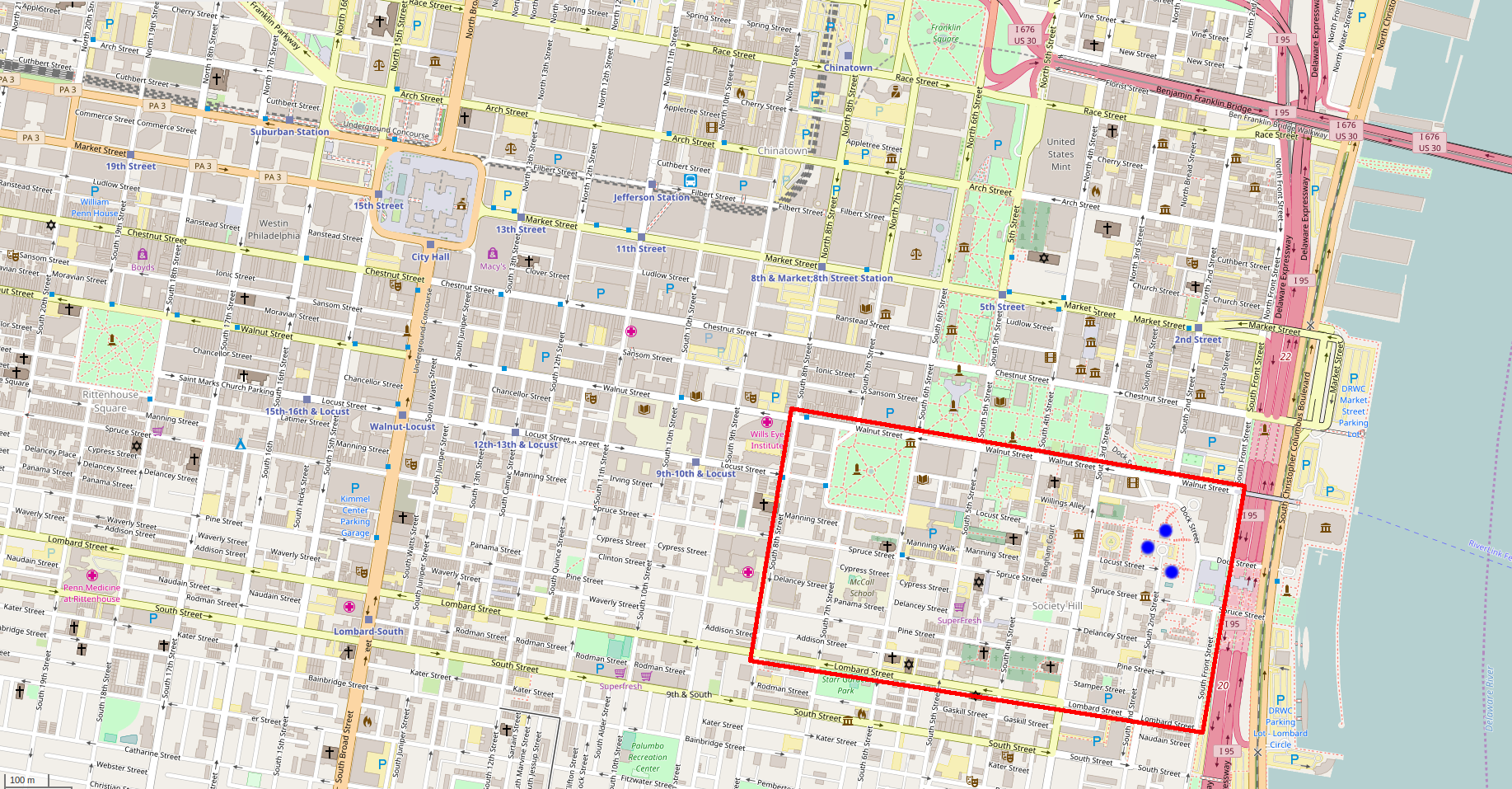
- Head House Square on the 400 block of S. 2nd Street Map of Center City Philadelphia with Society Hill outlined in red

- Location of Society Hill in Philadelphia Society Hill (Pennsylvania) Society Hill (the United States)
- Location: Center City, bounded by 8th, Front, Walnut, and Lombard Streets (Note: The Philadelphia Register of Historic Places (PRHP) set its proposed boundaries for the Society Hill historic district to include five adjacent groups of buildings. See the PRHP map reference and page 6 of the nomination document. The National Register of Historic Places boundaries include the area between Front St. and the Delaware River.)
- Coordinates: 39.945°N 75.149°W
- Area: 163 acres (66 ha)
- Built: 18th-century and later
- Architectural style: Georgian, Federal, Greek Revival
- NRHP reference No.: 71000065

Significant dates
- Added to NRHP: June 23, 1971
- Designated PRHP: March 10, 1999

Society Hill is a historic neighborhood in Center City, Philadelphia, Pennsylvania, United States, with a population of 6,215 as of the 2010 United States census. Settled in the early 1680s, Society Hill is one of the oldest residential neighborhoods in Philadelphia. After urban decay developed between the late 19th and early 20th centuries, an urban renewal program began in the 1950s, restoring the area and its many historic buildings. Society Hill has since become one of the most expensive neighborhoods with the highest average income and second-highest real estate values in Philadelphia. Society Hill's historic colonial architecture, along with planning and restoration efforts, led the American Planning Association to designate it, in 2008, as one of the great American neighborhoods and a good example of sustainable urban living.

The neighborhood hosts one of the largest concentrations of original 18th- and early 19th-century buildings in the United States. Society Hill is noted for its Franklin street lamps, brick sidewalks, cobblestone and Belgian block streets bordered by two- to four-story brick rowhouses in Federal and Georgian architecture, and public buildings in Greek Revival architecture such as the Merchants' Exchange Building (Note: Though the Merchants' Exchange Building is located on the north side of Walnut St. and could also be considered part of the Old City neighborhood, buildings on both sides of Walnut are included in the National Register of Historic Places boundaries for the Society Hill historic district.) and the Old Pine Street Church.

== Etymology ==
Society Hill is named after the 17th-century Free Society of Traders, which had its offices at Front Street on the hill above Dock Creek. The Free Society of Traders was a company of elite merchants, landowners, and personal associates of William Penn who were granted special concessions in order to direct the economy of the young colony.

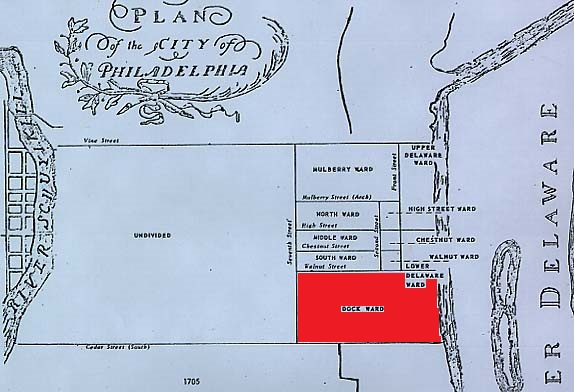
Society Hill known as the Dock Ward (1705)

Society Hill was initially known as the Dock Ward, an appropriate designation until the post-World War II period when the shipping industry declined and relocated. The Dock Ward, first defined in 1705, was one of the ten original wards that the city used to subdivide land east of 7th Street. As part of the 1854 Act of Consolidation, the Dock Ward was renamed the 5th Ward. The wards were realigned in 1965 and the boundaries of the 5th Ward no longer correspond to Society Hill's boundaries.

== Geography ==
The land area of Society Hill is approximately 0.254 square miles (163 acres). Bordering the Delaware River just south of Old City and Independence Hall, Society Hill is loosely defined as bounded by Walnut, Lombard, Front and 8th Streets. The Society Hill Civic Association further subdivides Society Hill along Spruce Street and 4th Street into quadrants by intercardinal directions: northeast (NE), southeast (SE), southwest (SW), and northwest (NW). Across different sources, variation in the exact border includes extending the eastern boundary to the Delaware River, the southern border to South Street, the northern border to Chestnut Street, or limiting the western border to 7th Street, making the boundaries coterminous with U.S. Census tracts 10.01 and 10.02.

== History ==
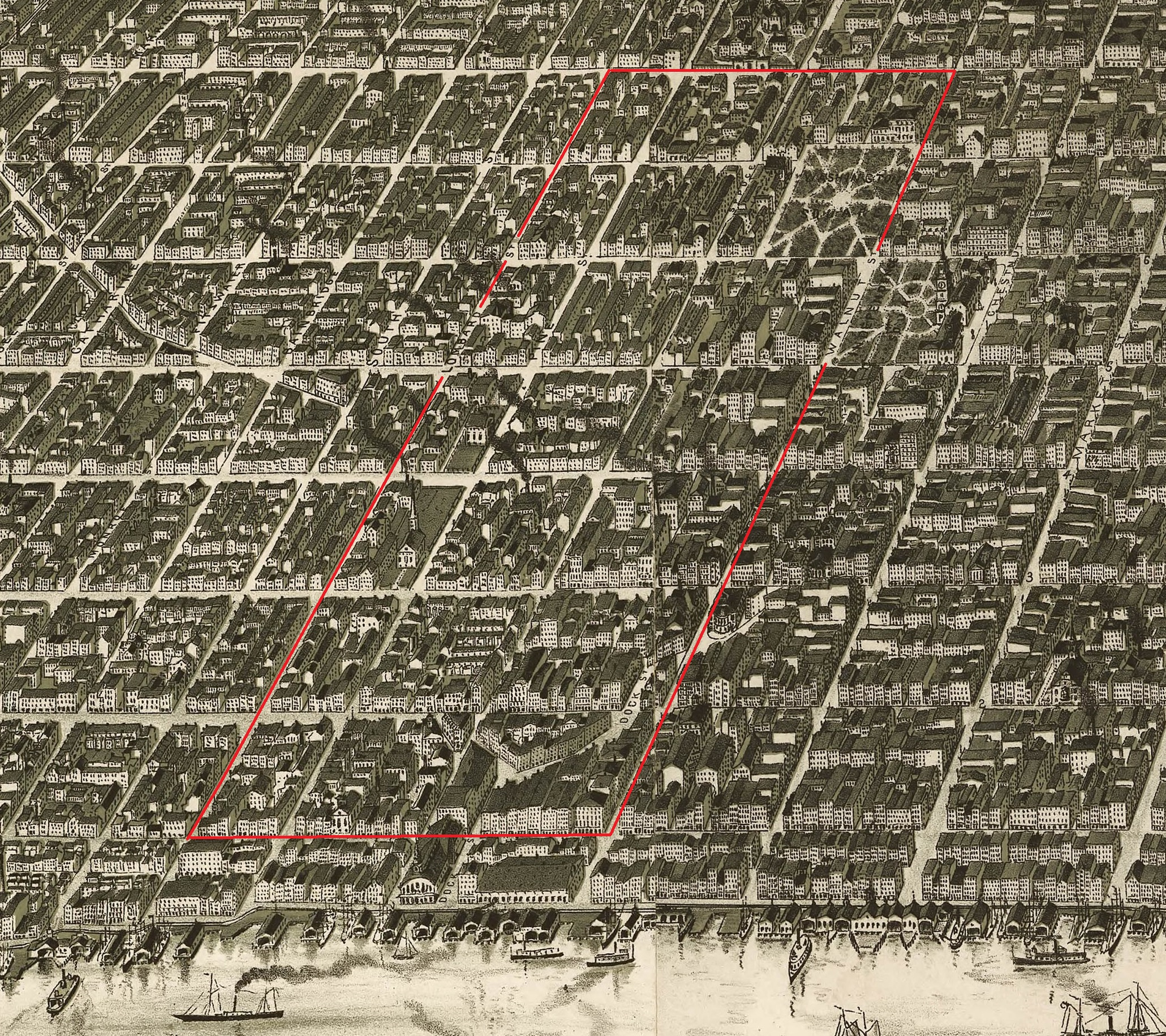
Society Hill (1886)

With prime access to the Delaware River and Philadelphia's civic buildings, including Independence Hall, the neighborhood quickly became one of the most populous areas in colonial Philadelphia. Several market halls, taverns and churches were built alongside brick houses of Philadelphia's affluent citizens.

After the Revolutionary War, the polluted Dock Creek—which had been used as a public sewer—became Dock Street when the city filled in the creek and created a new food distribution market. Though the streets of Philadelphia were carefully laid out in a grid, the new Dock Street's arc connecting Chestnut and Spruce Streets between 2nd and 3rd, owes its uncharacteristic shape to the path of the former creek as it ran to the river.

In the 19th century, the city expanded westward and the area lost its appeal. Houses deteriorated, and by the 1940s, Society Hill had become a slum neighborhood, one of the worst in the city.

In the 1950s, the city, state and federal governments began one of the first urban renewal programs aimed at the preservation of historic buildings. While most commercial 19th-century buildings were demolished, historically-significant houses were restored by occupants or taken over by the Philadelphia Redevelopment Authority and sold to individuals who agreed to restore the exteriors. Replicas of 18th-century street lights and brick sidewalks were added to enhance the colonial atmosphere. Empty lots and demolished buildings were replaced with parks, walkways, and modern townhouses.

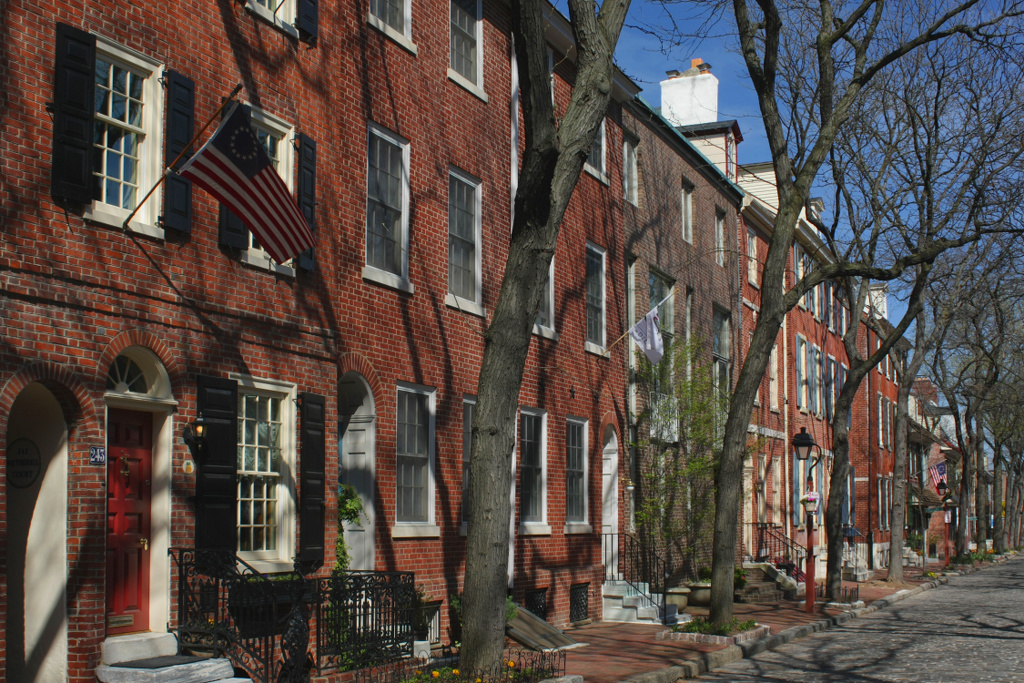
Delancey Street (2009)

From 1957–1959, the Greater Philadelphia Movement, the Redevelopment Authority and the Old Philadelphia Development Corporation bought 31 acres (130,000 m^{2}) around Dock Street. They demolished and relocated the Dock Street market, setting aside 5 acres (20,000 m^{2}) of land that would become the Society Hill Towers. In 1957, Edmund Bacon, the executive director of the Philadelphia City Planning Commission, awarded developer-architect firm Webb and Knapp the competition for the redevelopment of Society Hill. Architect I. M. Pei and his team designed a plan for three 31-story Society Hill Towers and low-rise buildings. The Towers and townhouses project was completed in 1964, while the entire plan was completed in 1977. Architect Louis Sauer designed dozens of rowhouse projects for the area around Society Hill, including Waverly Court and Penn's Landing Square.

Historic buildings in Society Hill include the Society Hill Synagogue, built in 1829 as a Baptist church by Philadelphia architect Thomas Ustick Walter, one of the architects of the United States Capitol in Washington, D.C. The synagogue was entered into the National Register of Historic Places in 1971. Another notable building is St. Peter's Church, constructed between 1758 and 1761 by Robert Smith. Congregation Kesher Israel occupies and has renovated the building constructed by the Universalist Church in 1796 at 412 Lombard Street.

The Society Hill Historic District was listed on the National Register of Historic Places in 1971. In 1999, it was listed on the Philadelphia Register of Historic Places.

== Demographics ==
Historical population
| Year | Pop. | ±% |
|---|---|---|
| 1860 | 24,792 | — |
| 1950 | 7,000 | −71.8% |
| 1970 | 4,841 | −30.8% |
| 1980 | 5,213 | +7.7% |
| 1990 | 5,715 | +9.6% |
| 2000 | 5,808 | +1.6% |
| 2010 | 6,215 | +7.0% |
| 2020 | 7,644 | +23.0% |
Source: Encyclopedia of Greater Philadelphia for 1860 and 1950 populations. Center City District for populations from 1970-2010. 2020 population for Census tracts 10.01 (2,993) and 10.02 (4,651).

As of the 2010 U.S. Census, there were 6,215 people residing in Society Hill, which accounts for 0.4% of Philadelphia's total population. With 22,281 people per square mile, Society Hill's population density is about twice that of Philadelphia's 11,497 people per square mile.

== Education ==
=== Primary and secondary schools ===
Residents of all neighborhoods in Philadelphia are assigned to specific public schools by the School District of Philadelphia. Society Hill residents are zoned to the General George A. McCall School, located at 325 S. 7th Street, for kindergarten through eighth grade, and all persons zoned to McCall are assigned to Benjamin Franklin High School. Previously Furness High School was the zoned high school for Society Hill.

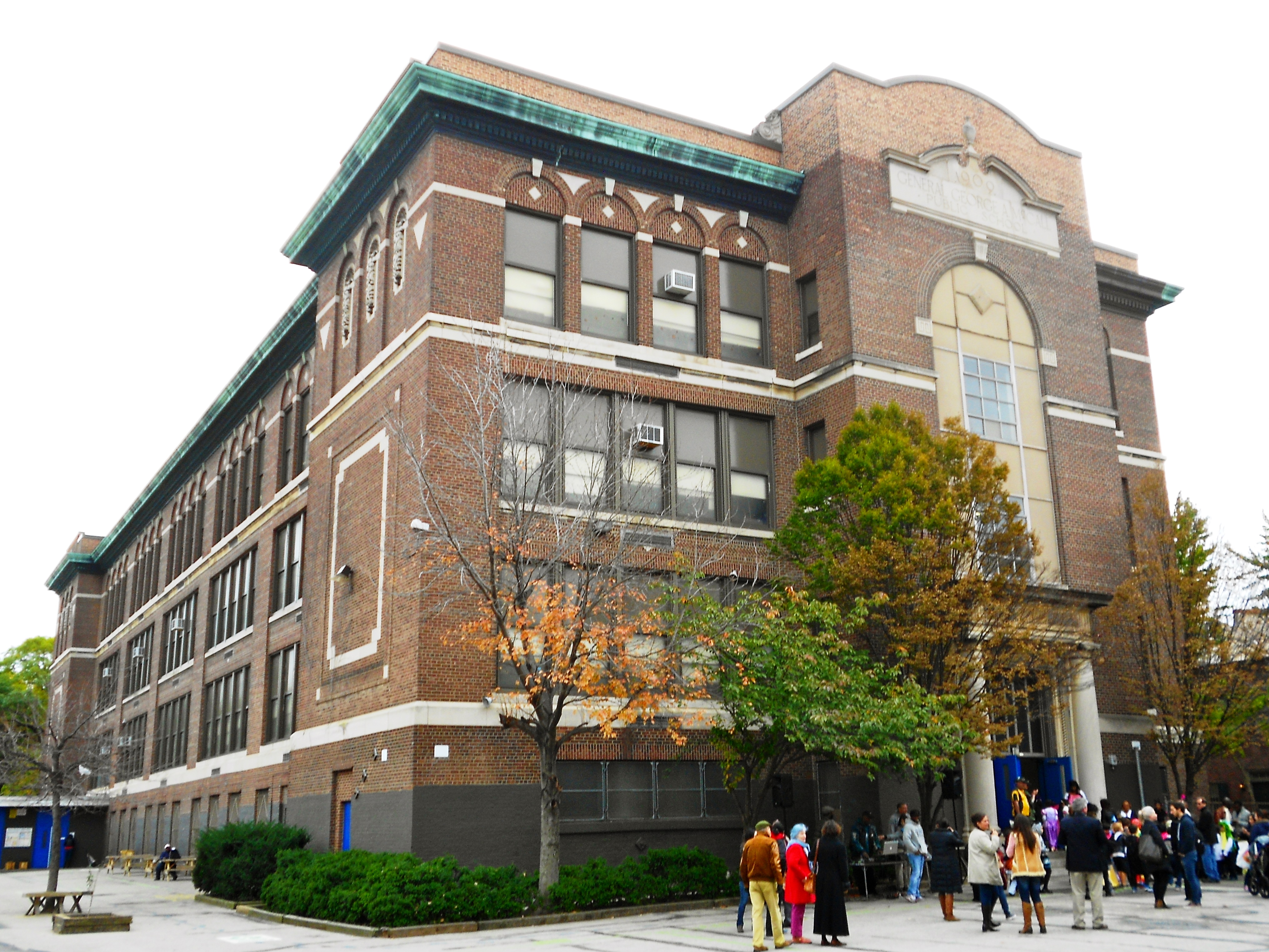
George A. McCall School, the public K-8 school

The McCall School serves Society Hill and the Chinatown areas. A construction contract for the McCall school building was awarded on October 26, 1909 and the official opening occurred in February 1911. Russell Scott Smith of Edutopia wrote that in 2004, compared with other schools in Philadelphia, "McCall already had a fairly good reputation for academic rigor and safety" and that by 2009 it had improved even more. In 2012 Kristen A. Graham of The Philadelphia Inquirer stated that McCall was one of "the district's stronger neighborhood schools".

St. Peter's School, located on Lombard Street between 3rd and 4th, is an independent, coeducational, non-sectarian day school, serving students in preschool (age 3) through eighth grade. The school was founded in 1834.

The designated parochial grade school of Old St. Mary's Church and Old St. Joseph's Church, of the Roman Catholic Archdiocese of Philadelphia, is St. Mary Interparochial Grade School.

=== Libraries ===
The Free Library of Philadelphia operates the Independence Branch at 18 South 7th Street. The Athenaem is a private library and museum with collections including architecture and interior design history, particularly for the period from 1800 to 1945.

== Historic congregations ==
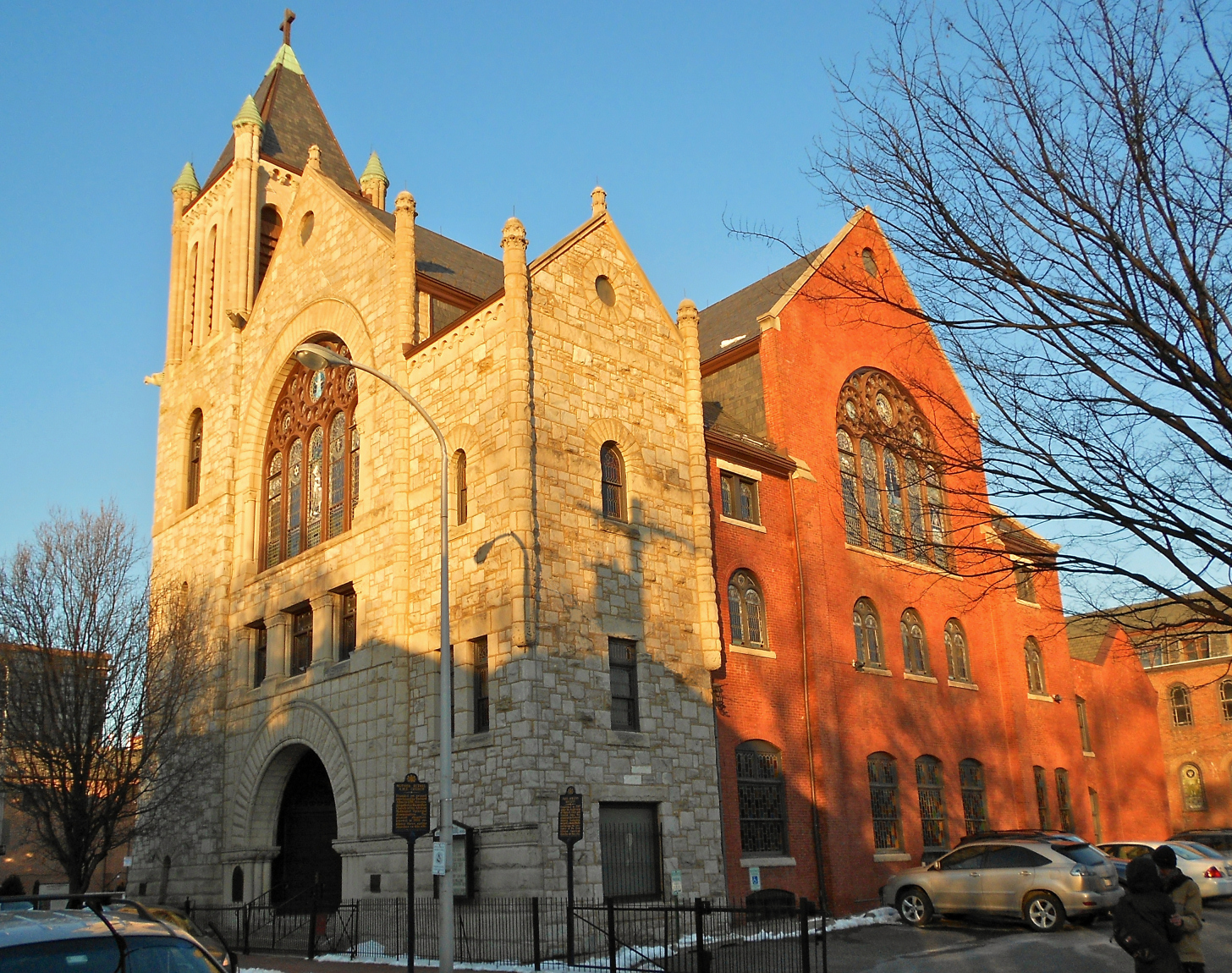
Mother Bethel AME Church at Lombard and 6th Streets

Society Hill's many historically significant congregations reflect the fruition of William Penn's Quaker maxim of religious toleration.

- Old St. Joseph's Church (1733)
- St. Peter's Church (1761)
- Old St. Mary's Church (1763)
- Old Pine Street Church (1768)
- Holy Trinity Church (1784)
- Mother Bethel A.M.E. Church (1794)
- Society Hill Synagogue (since 1967; First Baptist from 1829–1909; Roumanian-American Hebrew Congregation from 1910-1966)

== Transportation ==
Society Hill is accessible via several forms of public transportation.

=== Rapid Transit ===
Transportation network
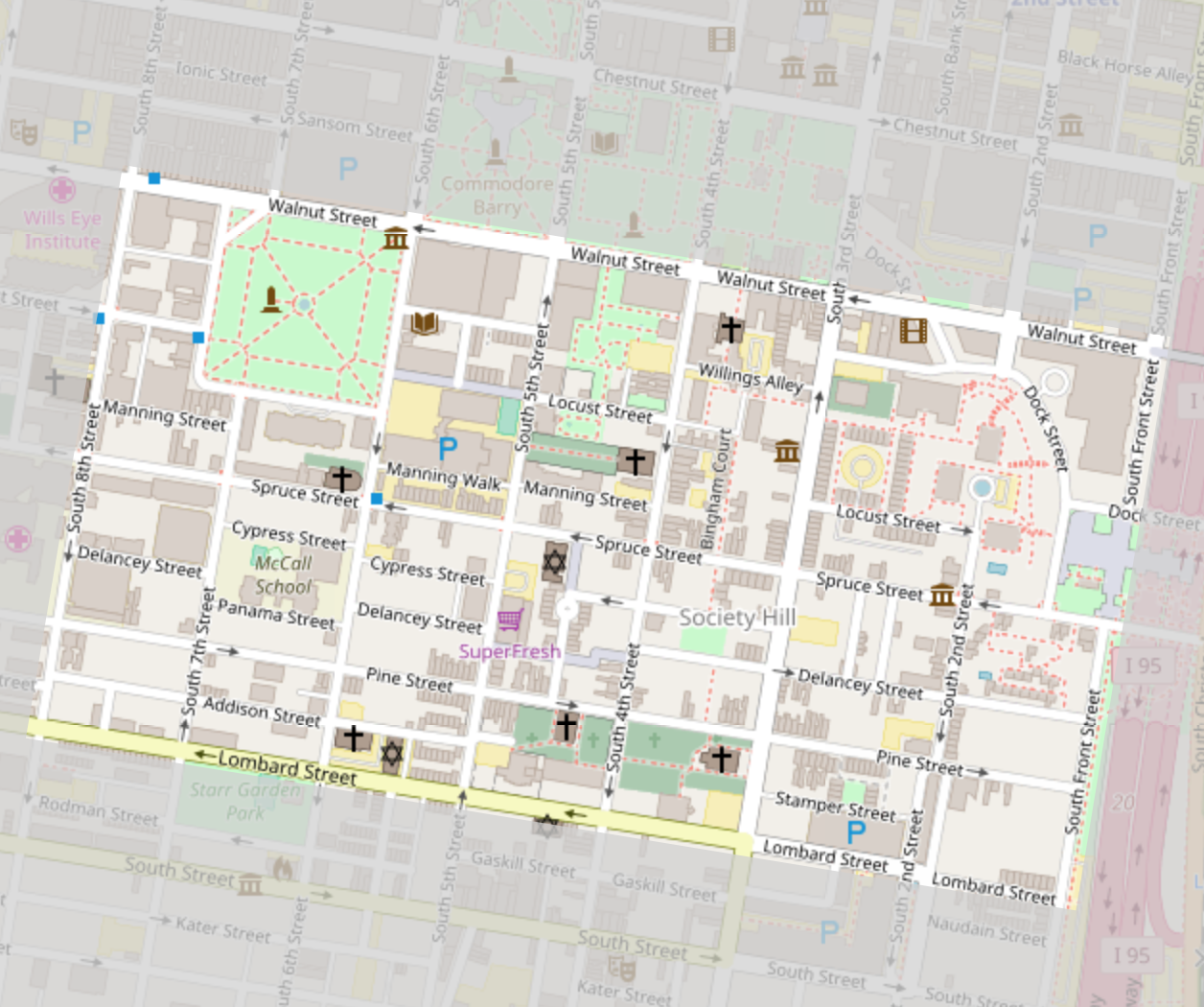
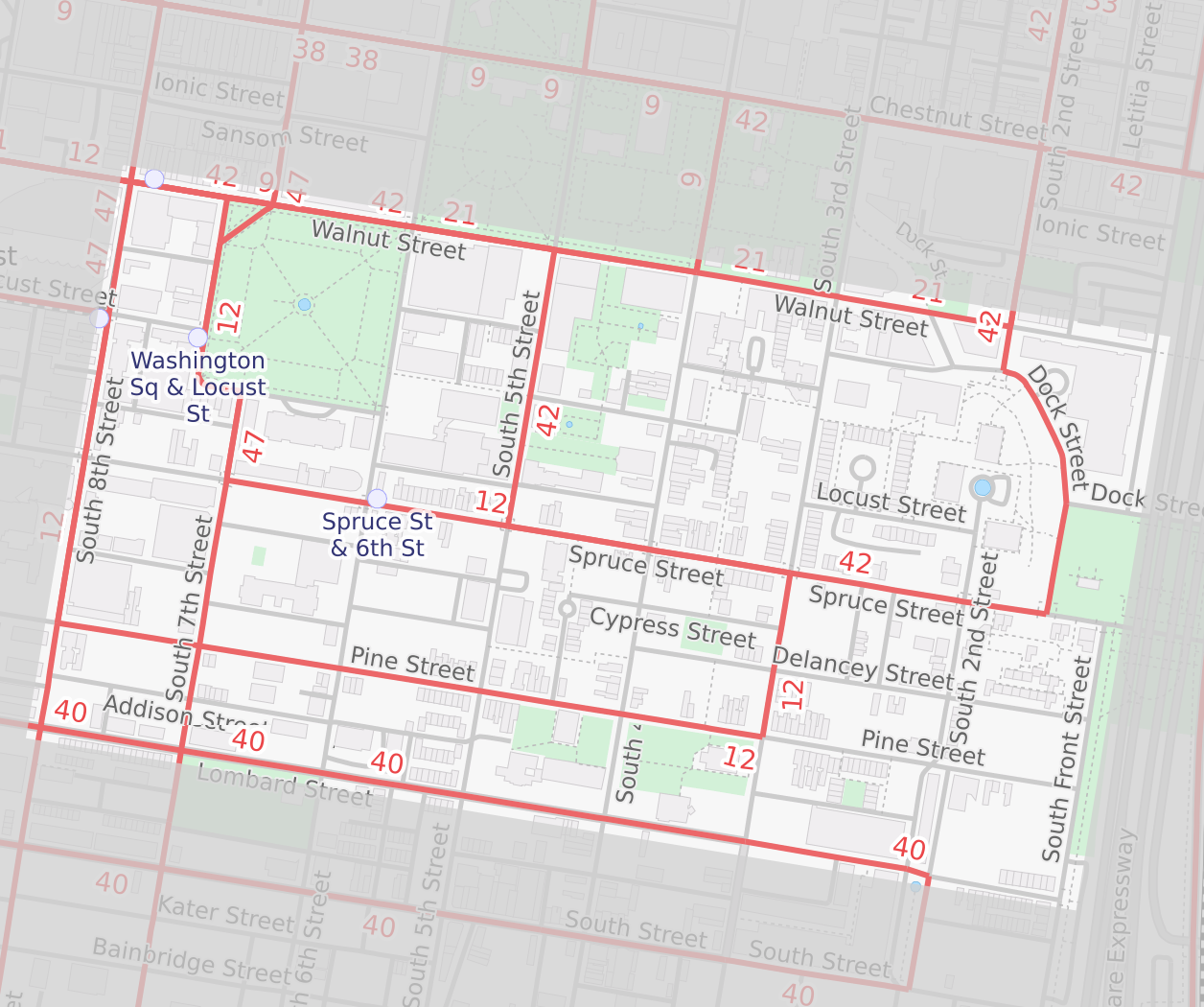
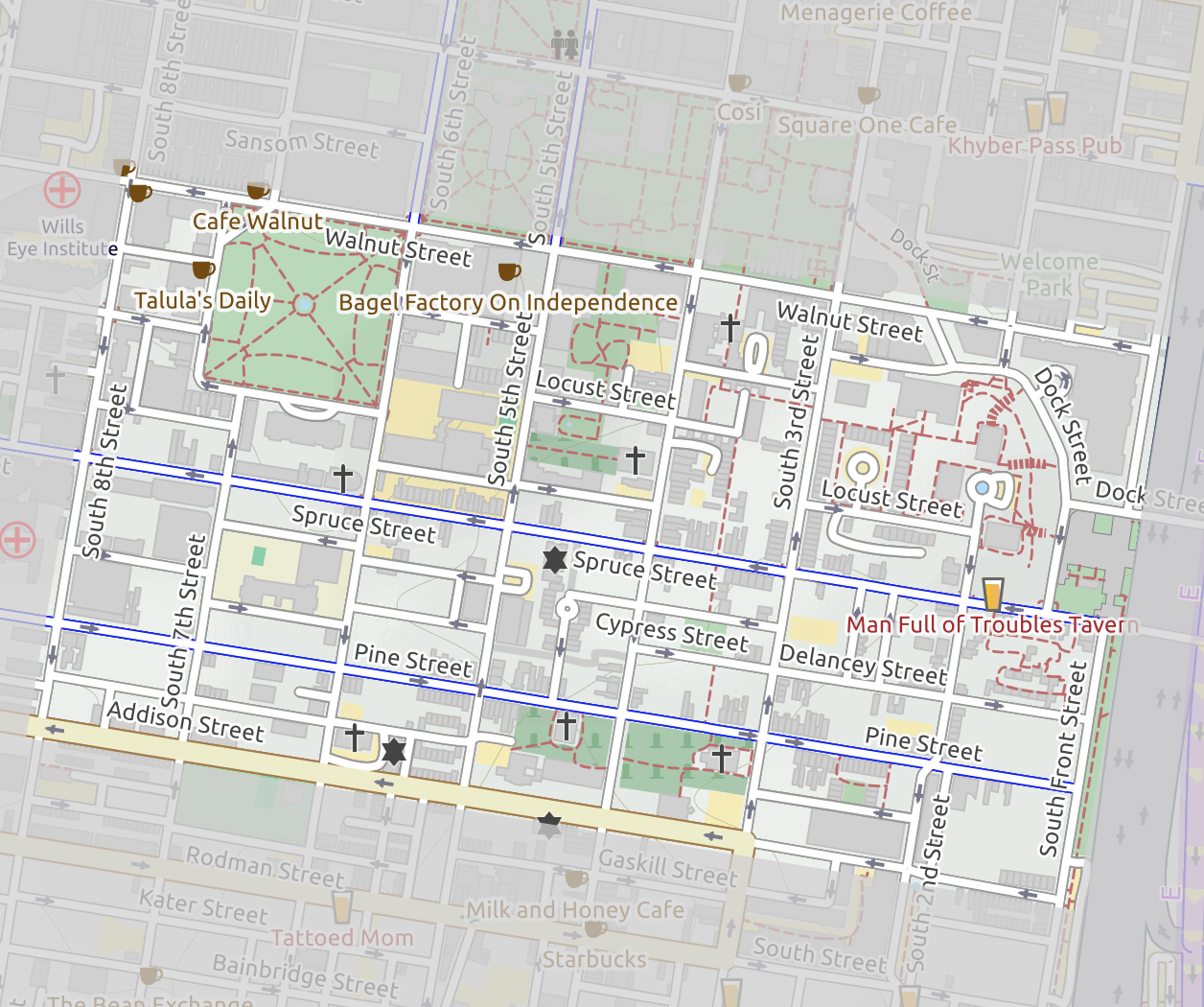
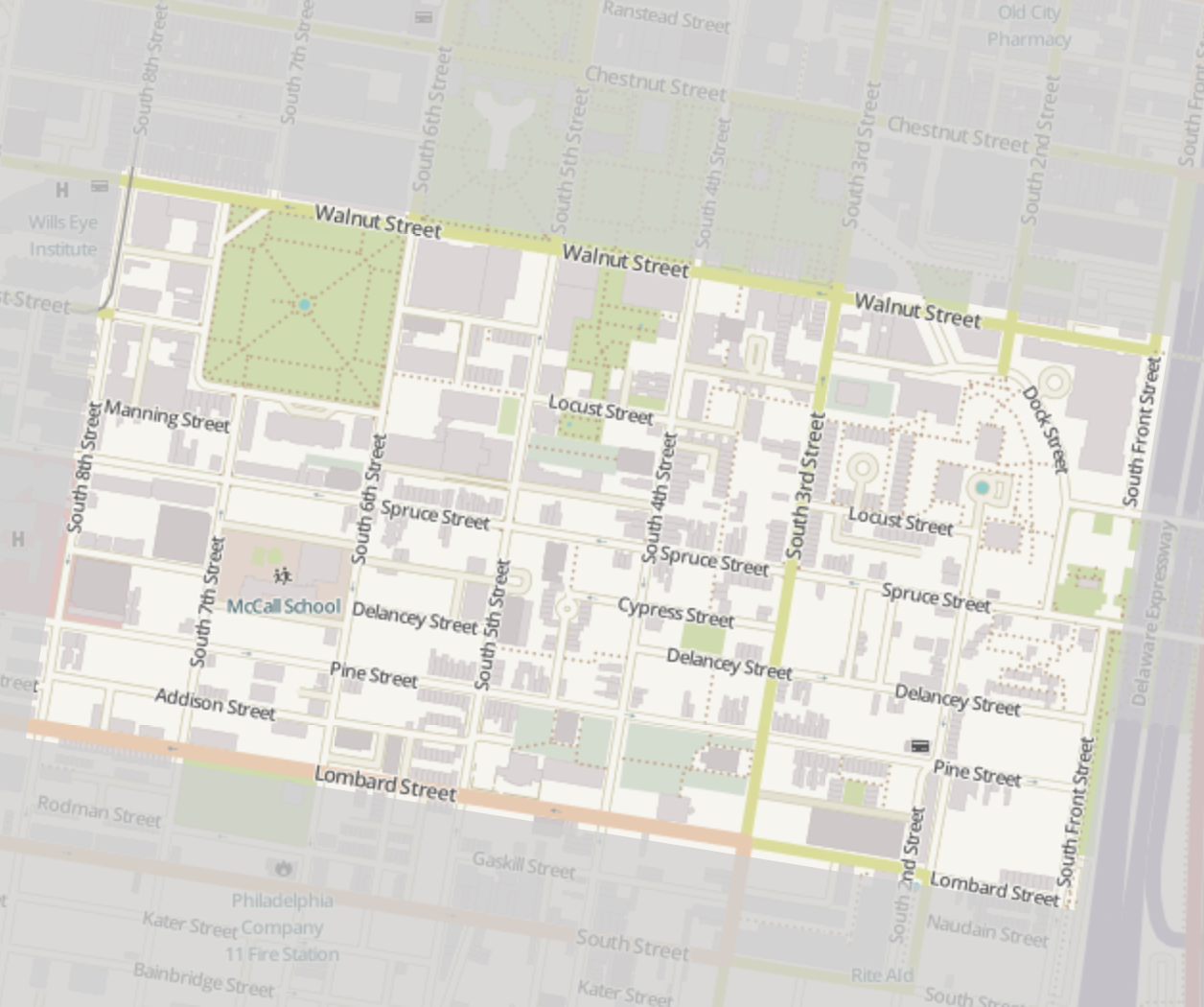
- Location within Society Hill Location within Society Hill Bus Routes Location within Society Hill Bike Lanes Location within Society Hill Greenways

The Market–Frankford subway line stops at 2nd Street and 5th Street, which are two blocks north of Society Hill's Walnut Street boundary.

The PATCO Speedline, a rapid transit system connecting Philadelphia and southern New Jersey stops at 8th and Market Street station, two blocks north of Society Hill, and at the 9th and Locust Street station, which is one block west of Society Hill's 8th Street boundary.

=== Bus ===
The SEPTA 9 and 21 buses run westbound along Walnut Street. The 12 and 42 run westbound along parts of Spruce and Walnut Streets. The 12 also runs eastbound along Pine Street. The 47 runs northbound along 7th Street and southbound along 8th Street. The 57 runs northbound along 3rd Street and southbound along 4th Street.

=== Bikeshare ===
Since 2009, as part of a crosstown buffered bike lane pilot project, bike lanes were installed that run eastbound along Pine Street and westbound along Spruce Street. Society Hill is served by Indego bike-share stations at 9th and Locust Streets, 4th and Walnut Streets, Dock and Front Streets, 2nd and Lombard Streets, and 6th and Locust Streets.

=== Greenways ===
Society Hill contains pathways that connect the residential neighborhood with historic areas to the north. These paths are known as greenways and were designed specifically for pedestrian travel to minimize interaction with automobile traffic. The landscaped greenways were conceived by Edmund Bacon, who hired John Collins of Adleman, Collins & DuTot to design small-scale greenway parks and pedestrian connections woven mid-block between buildings. St. Joseph's Way, St. Peter's Way, and Lawrence Court Walk are greenways that connect community places including St. Peter's, Old Pine, Three Bears Park, and Bingham Court. The greenways feature public art and are designed to create a neighborhood that is walkable, rather than a disjointed collection of historic buildings.

== Notable people ==
Society Hill has long been a popular neighborhood for numerous notable people. Past and present notable residents include:

- Lynne Abraham (b. 1941)
- Richard Allen (1760-1831)
- Baruch Samuel Blumberg (Nobel Prize winner) (1925-2011)
- Richardson Dilworth (1898-1974)
- Terry Gross (b. 1951)
- Alexander Hamilton (1757-1804)
- Thaddeus Kosciuszko (1746-1817)
- James Madison (1751-1836) and Dolley Madison (1768-1849)
- John Penn (1729-1795)
- Philip Syng Physick (1768-1837)
- Samuel Powel (1738-1793)
- Wendell Pritchett
- Thomas Sully (1783-1872)
- Chase Utley (b. 1978), longtime major league baseball player

== Points of interest ==
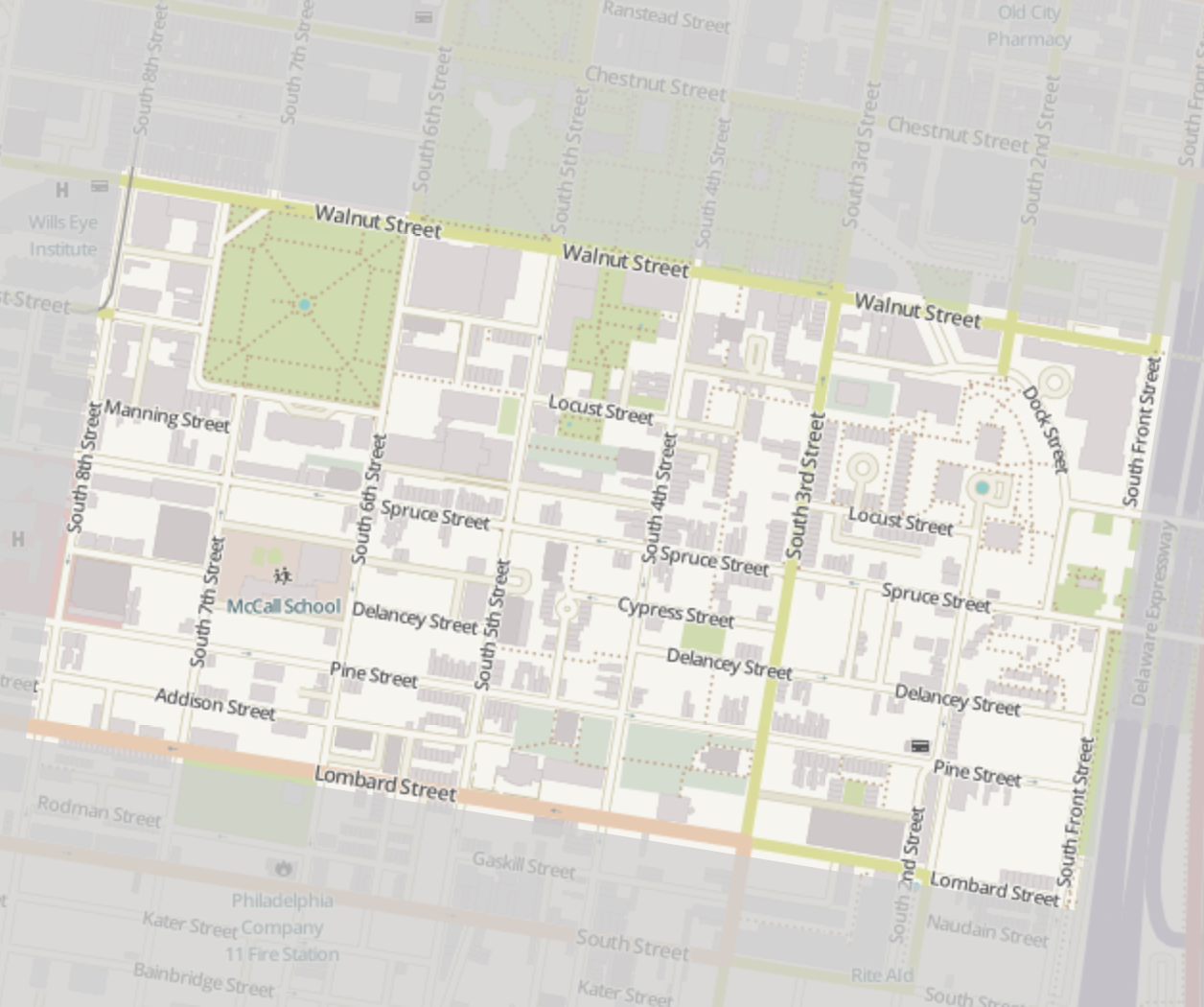
Points of interest in Society Hill (mouseover the numbers on the map above to display the place name or see the larger Wikimedia annotated version)

Some of the most notable points of interest within Society Hill are listed below and marked on the adjacent map.

1. The St. James 700 Walnut St.
2. Tomb of the Unknown Revolutionary War Soldier – Washington Square
3. Athenaeum of Philadelphia 219 S. 6th St.
4. Contributionship 212 S. 4th St.
5. Old St. Joseph's Church 321 Willings Alley
6. Powel House 244 S. 3rd St.
7. Society Hill Towers 200 Locust St.
8. Korean War Memorial 109 Spruce St.
9. Sully Residence 530 Spruce St.
10. Society Hill Synagogue 418 Spruce St.
11. St. Mary's Roman Catholic Church 252 S. Fourth St.
12. Physick House 321 S. 4th St.
13. Cassey House 243 Delancey St.
14. Mother Bethel A.M.E. Church 419 S. 6th St.
15. Cong. B'nai Abraham 523 Lombard St.
16. Vilna Congregation 509 Pine St.
17. Old Pine Street Church 412 Pine St.
18. St. Peter's School 319 Lombard St.
19. St. Peter's Episcopal Church 3rd and Pine St.
20. Kosciuszko House 301 Pine St.
21. Head House 400 block of S. 2nd St.

Points of interest just north of Society Hill are the Liberty Bell, Independence Hall, Carpenters' Hall, the First Bank of the United States, the Second Bank of the United States, the Merchants' Exchange Building, and the Museum of the American Revolution.

== Film appearances ==
- In National Treasure (2004), Nicolas Cage's character runs through the streets of Society Hill, the graveyard of Old Pine Street Church and Headhouse Market.
- The Sixth Sense (1999)

== Gallery ==
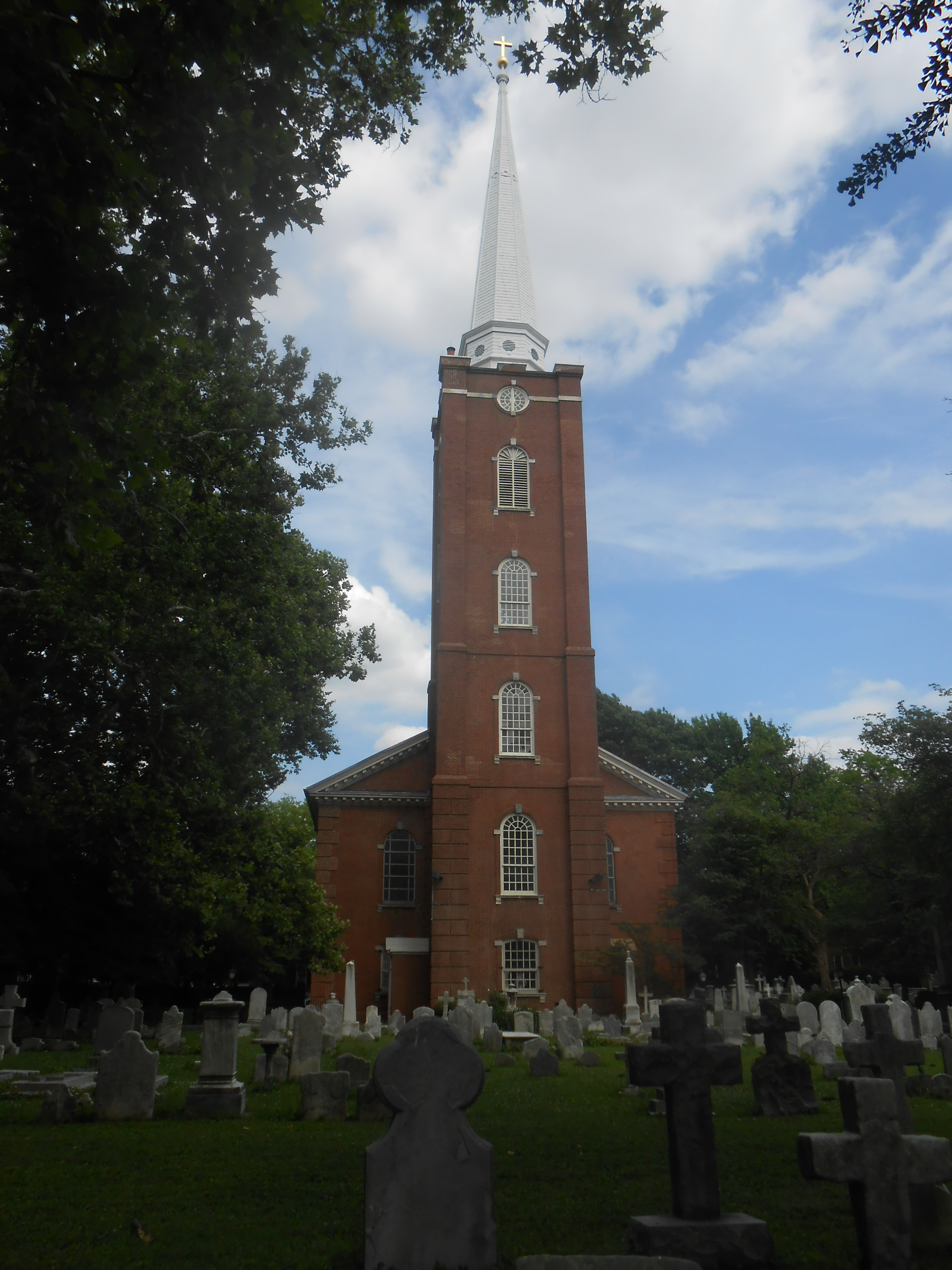
St. Peter's Church

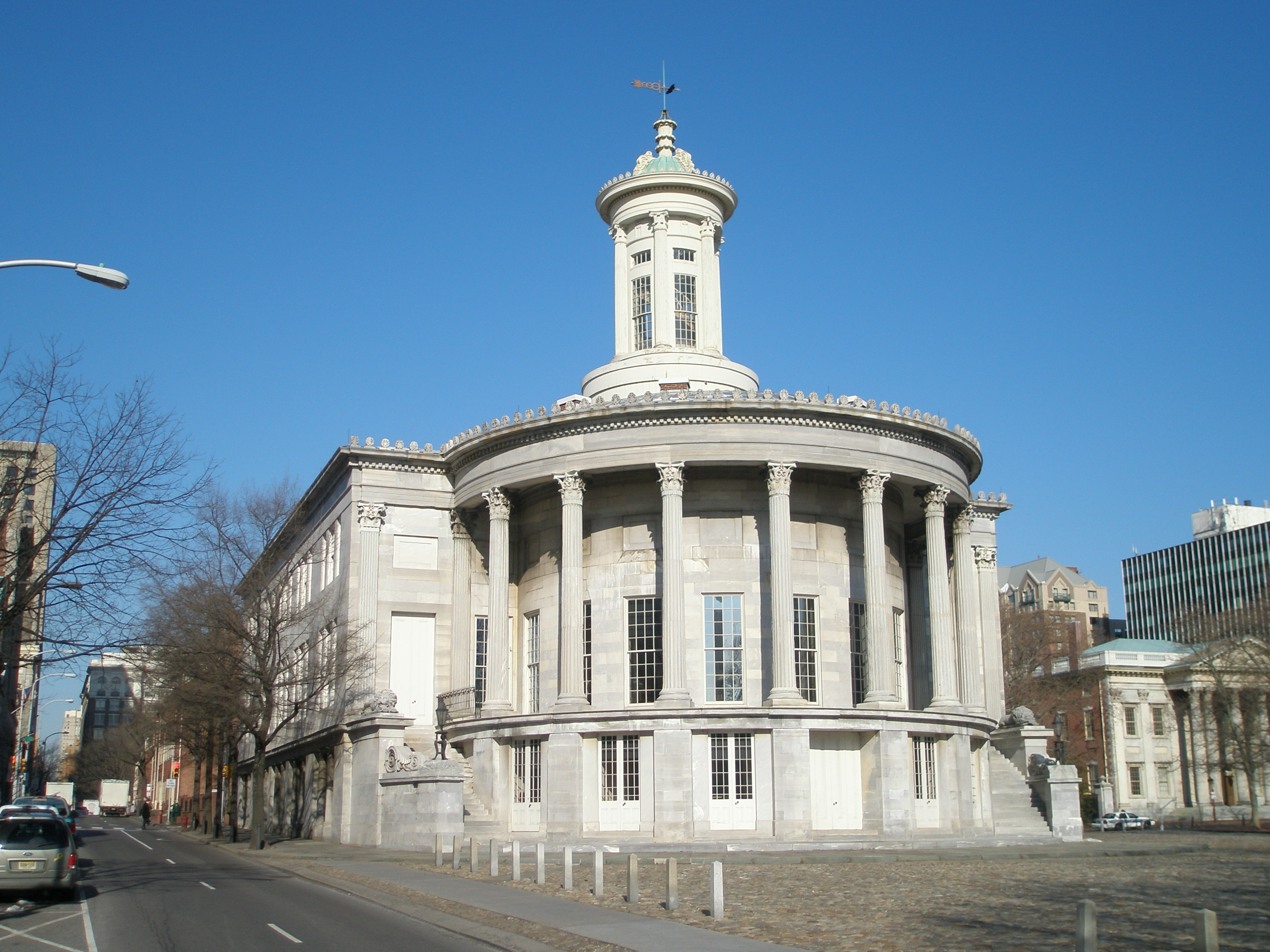
Merchants' Exchange Building

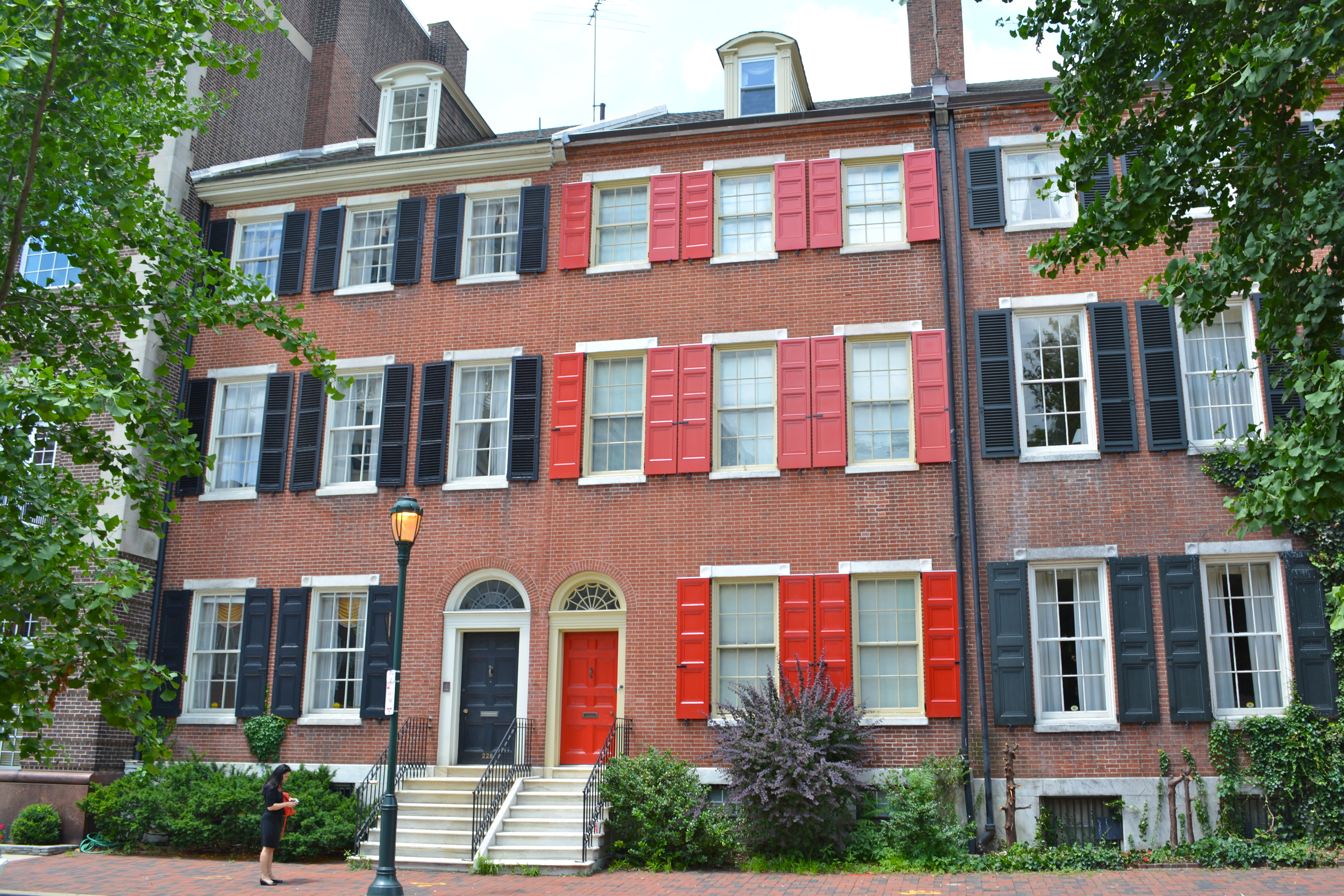
Townhouses by Washington Square

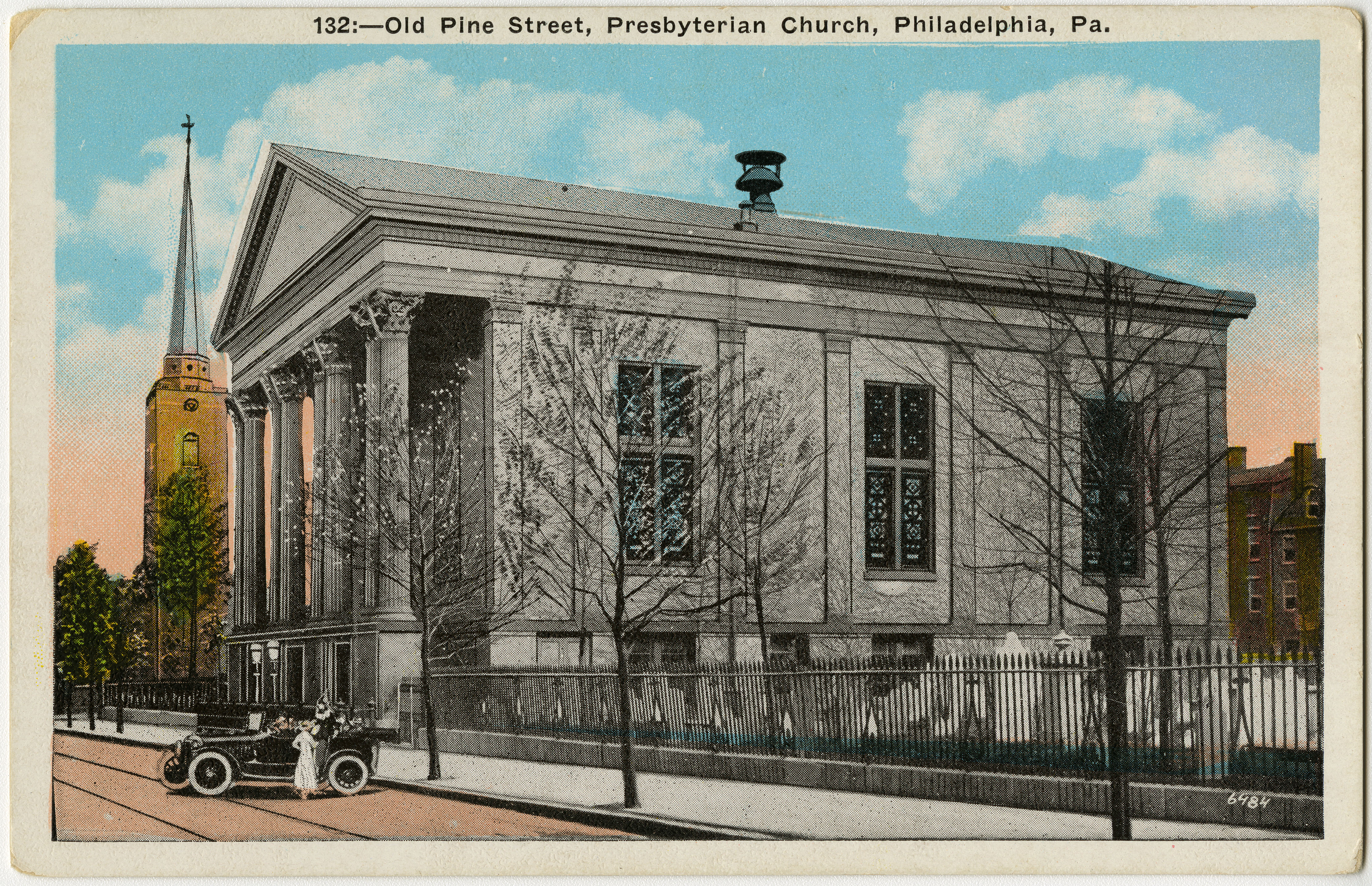
Old Pine Street Church

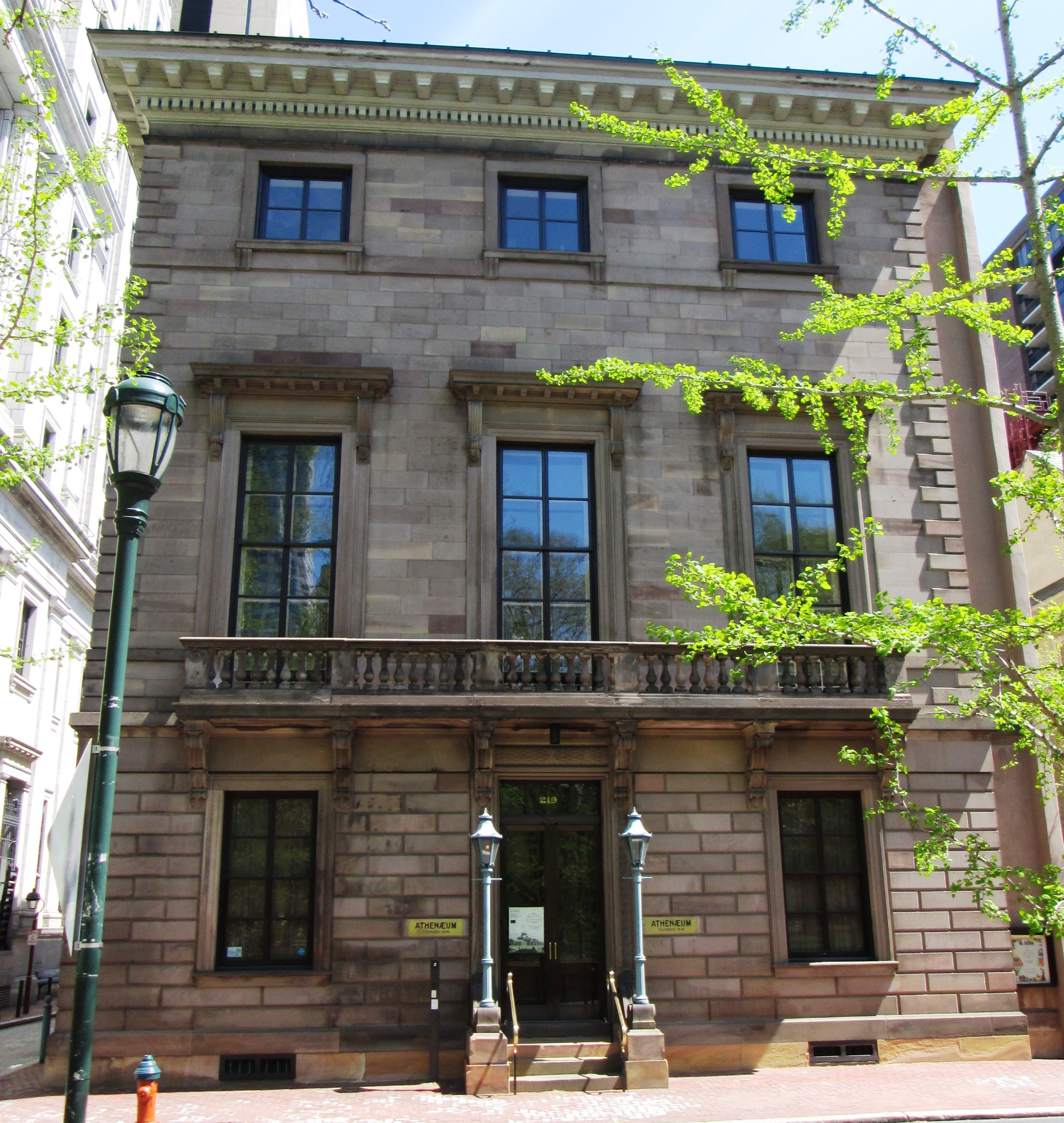
Athenaeum

== See also ==
- Cassey House
- Independence National Historical Park
- National Register of Historic Places listings in Center City, Philadelphia
- Philadelphia Korean War Memorial
