= Philadelphia Korean War Memorial =

Memorial in Philadelphia, Pennsylvania, USA

- United States
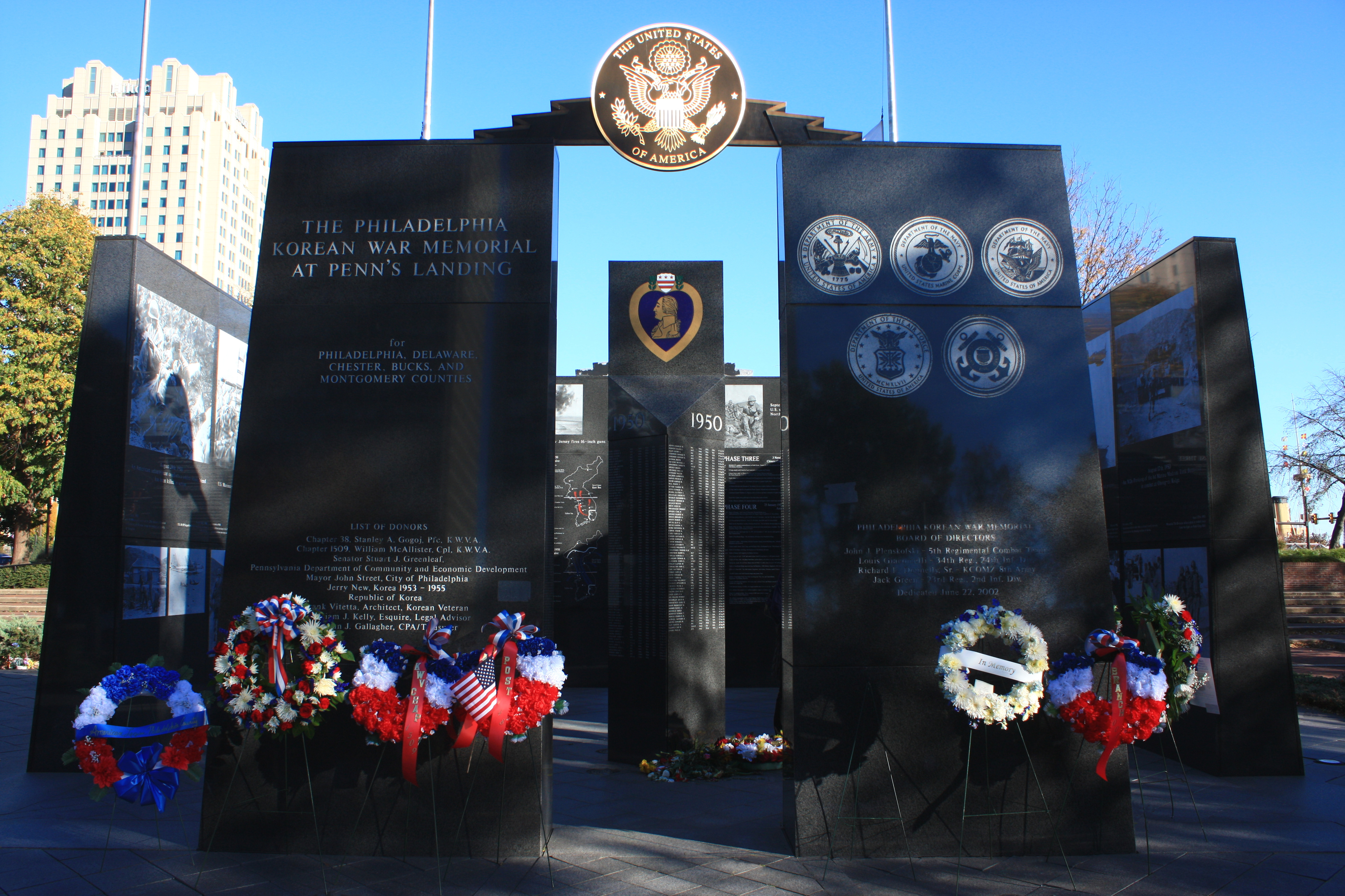
- Veterans Day wreaths at the western facade
- For all Korean War servicemen from Philadelphia and the four neighboring Pennsylvania counties.
- Established: June 22, 2002
- Location: 39.944911°N 75.143425°W; Philadelphia, Pennsylvania, USA
- Designed by: Jirair Youssefian, Vitetta Architects and Engineers
- The Philadelphia Korean War Memorial at Penn's Landing for Philadelphia, Delaware, Chester, Bucks, and Montgomery Counties

The Philadelphia Korean War Memorial at Penn's Landing in Philadelphia was initially dedicated on June 22, 2002 and was formally rededicated on Memorial Day, May 28, 2007 after additional work was completed. Each name of the more than 600 servicemen who were killed in action or listed as missing in action during the Korean War from Bucks, Chester, Delaware, Montgomery, and Philadelphia counties are etched in the memorial. Veterans Day and Memorial Day services are held onsite annually.

The memorial is located in Korean War Memorial Park in the Society Hill neighborhood, about 0.5 mi (0.80 km) from Independence Hall. The park is bounded on the south by Spruce Street, on the north by Dock Street, on the east by Christopher Columbus Boulevard along Penn's Landing and on the west by 38th Parallel Place. Interstate 95 runs under the eastern part of the park, while the memorial is located in the western section.

The memorial is owned by the city of Philadelphia and leased to a non-profit organization called the Friends of the Philadelphia Korean War Memorial which is based in the city.

== Design ==
The Philadelphia Korean War Memorial was designed by Jirair Youssefian of Vitetta Architects and Engineers in 1992. After a decade of planning and fundraising, along with site clearing and construction work performed by J.J. White Inc., the major parts of the memorial were finished by June, 2002. The remainder of the full design was constructed in 2007 after additional funding was obtained.

The central part of the memorial includes four 16 ft (4.9 m) tall black granite-clad columns which list all the Philadelphia area Korean War casualties—those killed in action, missing in action, or taken as a prisoner of war but never returned and presumed dead—from each year of the four-year conflict (1950-1953). The memorial also features six granite-clad monoliths with information sandblasted onto the surfaces including the major units involved in the war, specific events and battles, maps of the four phases of the war, laser engraved photographs, and markers honoring other participants such as the nurses of the Korean War. A bronze statue entitled The Final Farewell by artist Lorann Jacobs was added to the site in 2007, along with additional landscaping and granite pavers to create a new platform for the entire memorial.

== Gallery ==
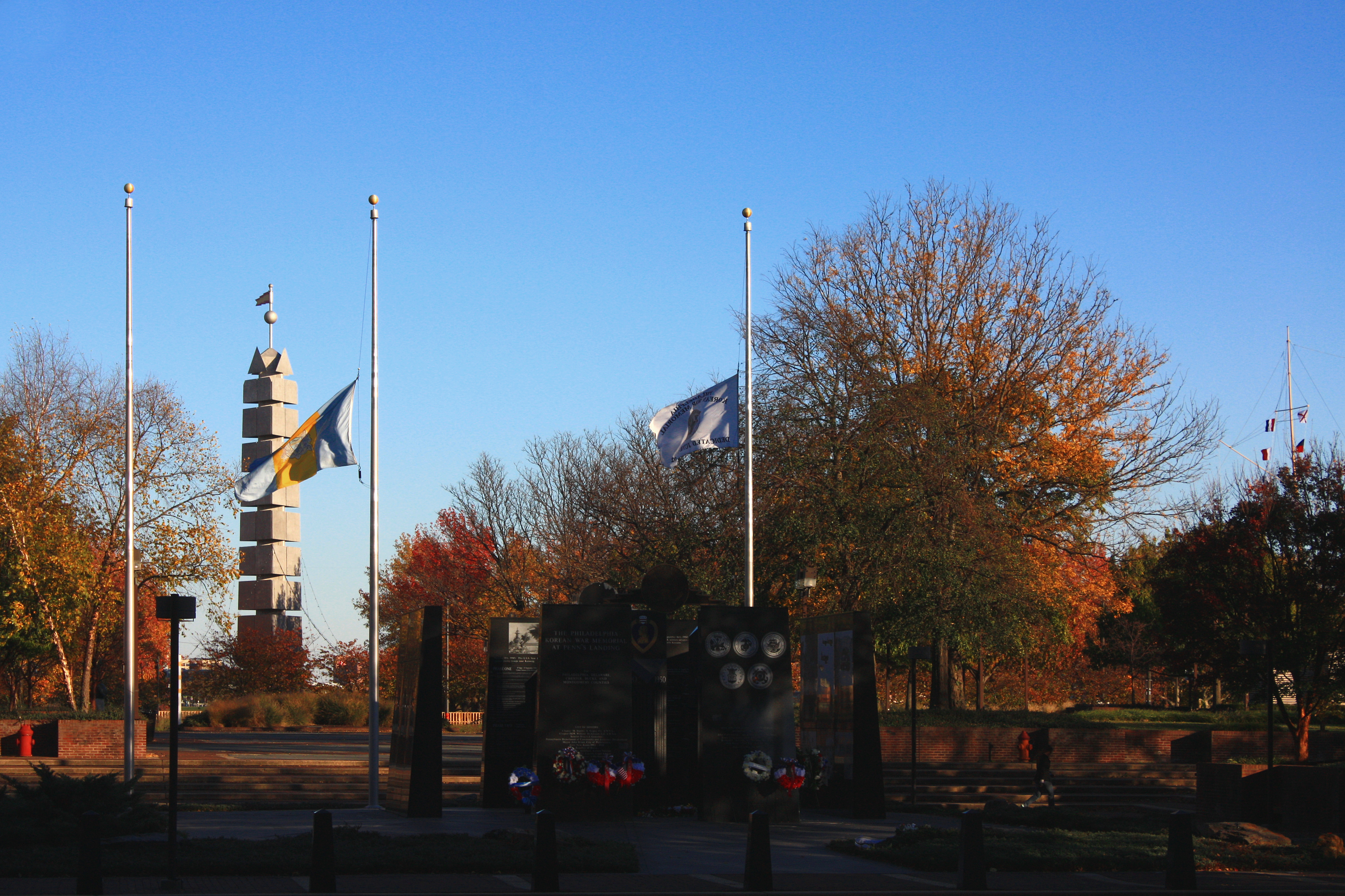
Wide view from the west

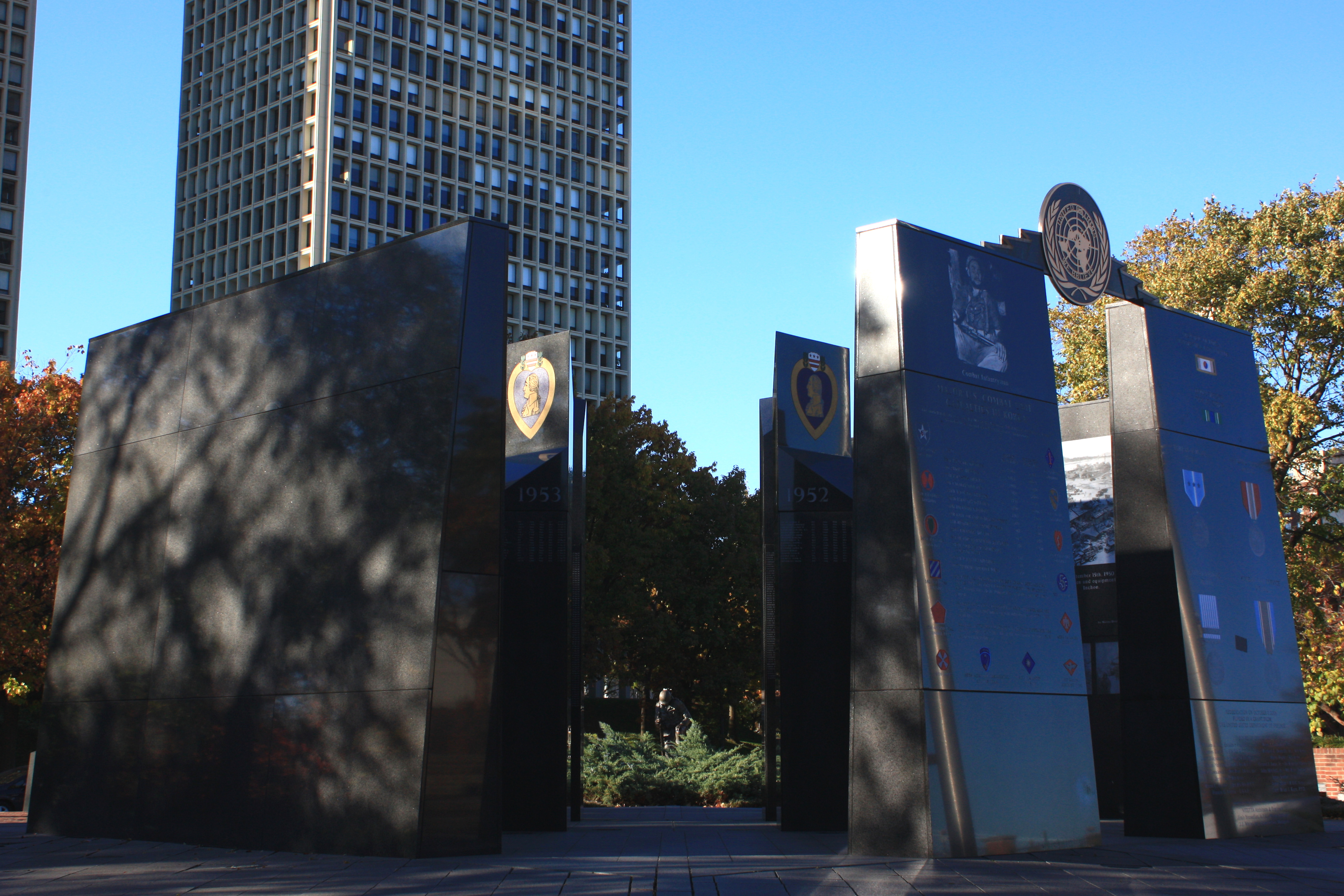
From the southeast

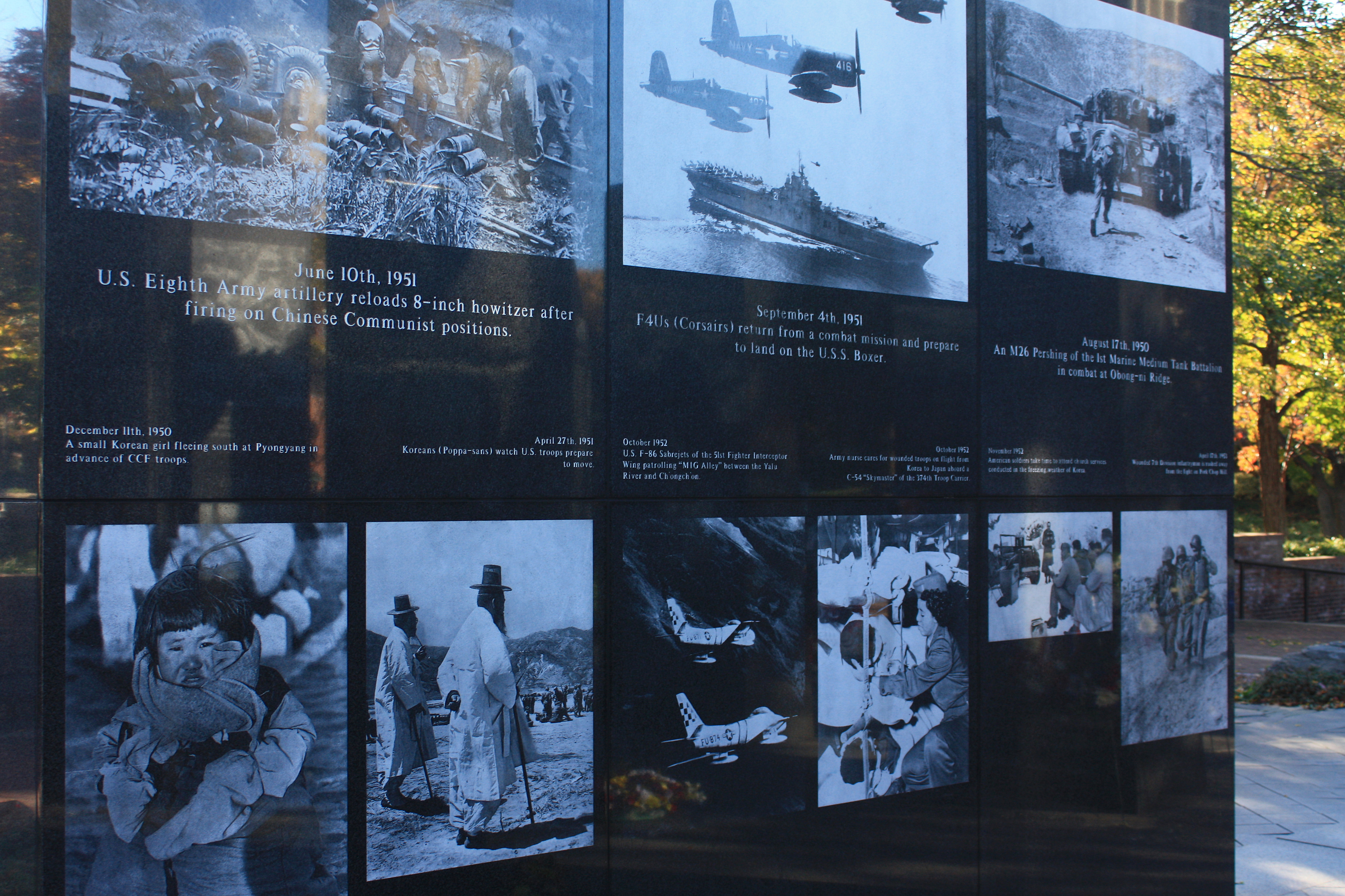
South image panel

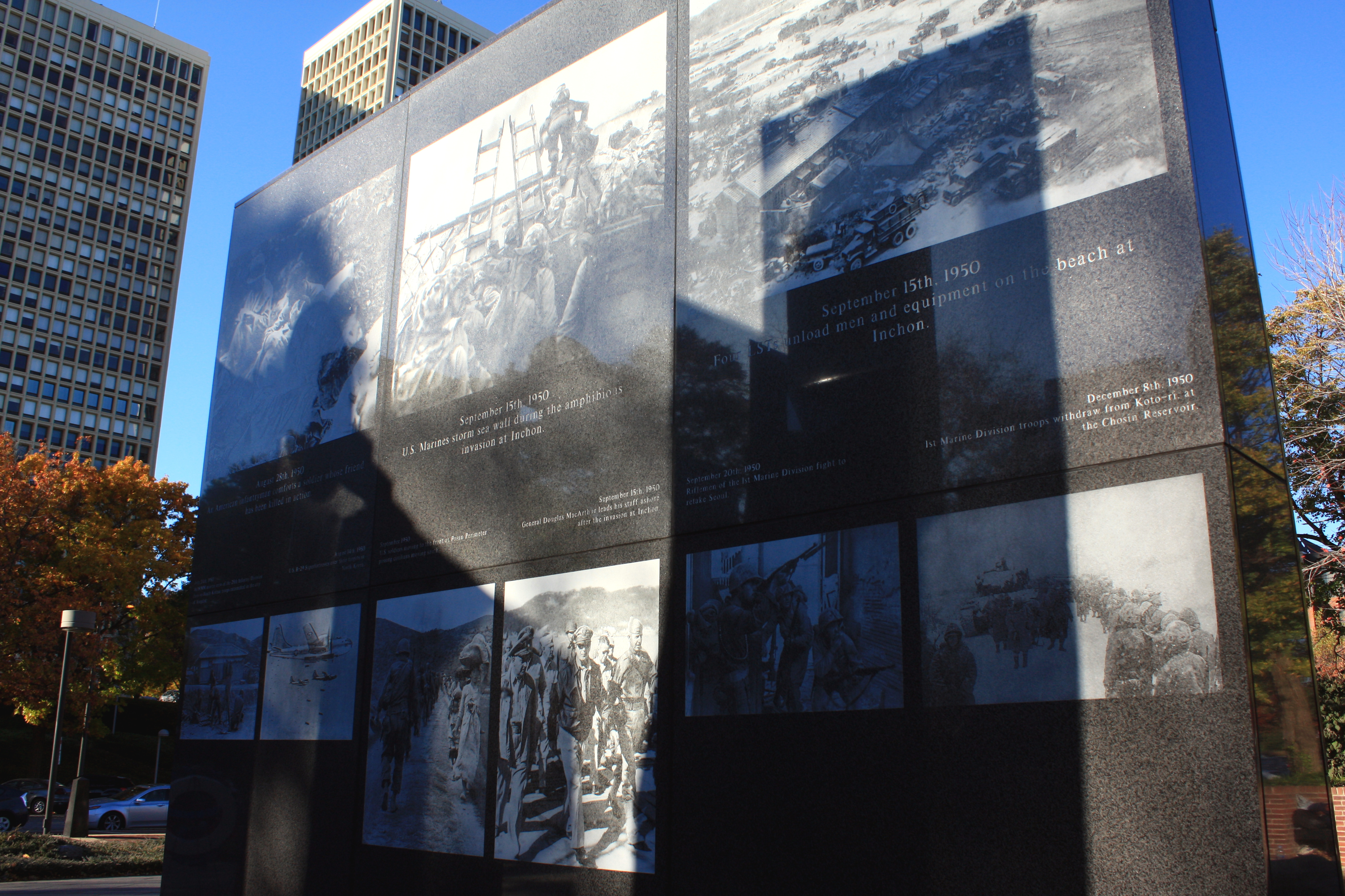
North image panel

== See also ==
- Korean War Veterans Memorial, national memorial in Washington, D.C.
- List of Korean War memorials, memorials around the world
