= Society Hill Synagogue =

Synagogue in Philadelphia, PA

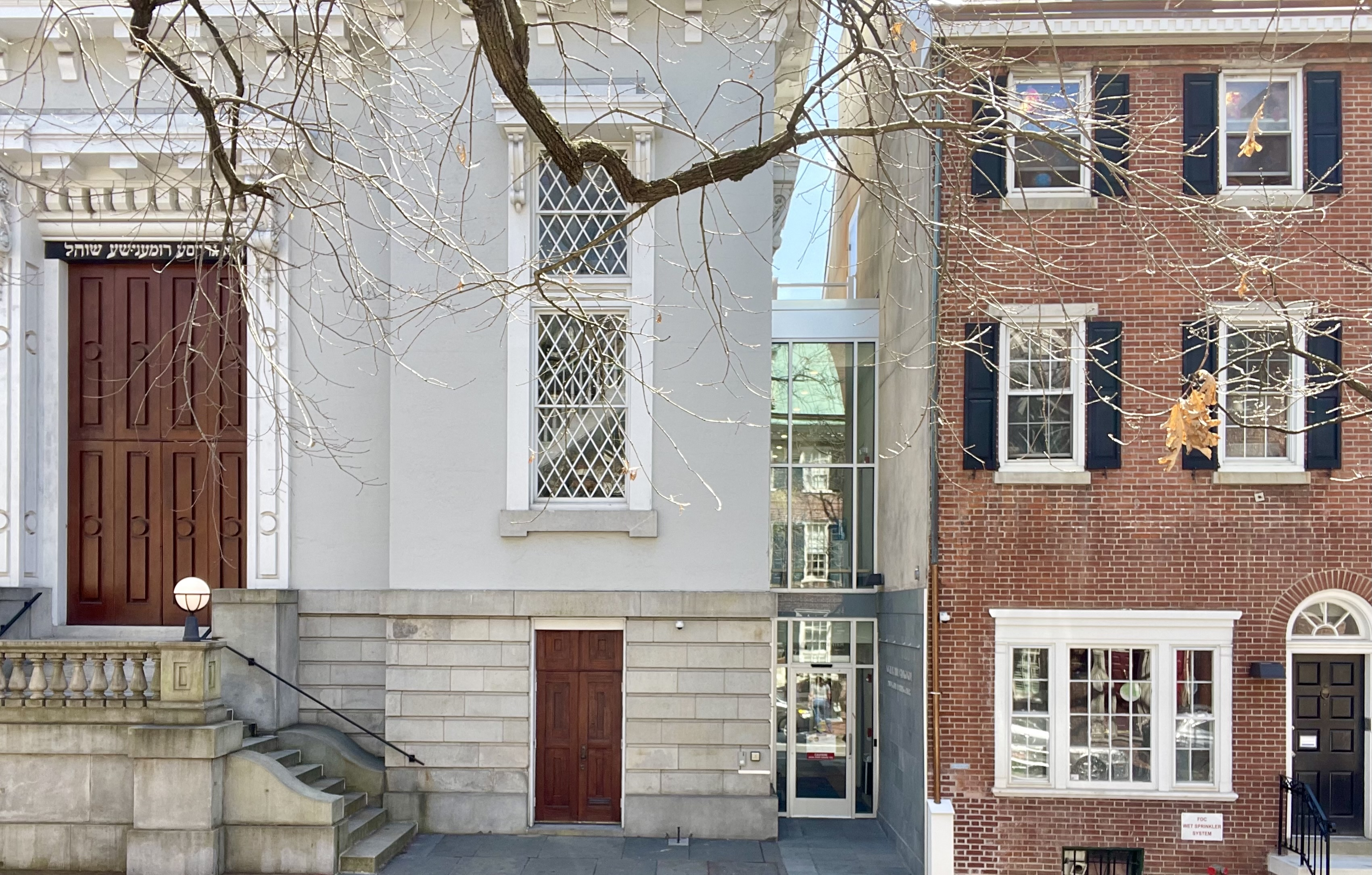
- Society Hill Synagogue

- Location in Philadelphia

Religion
- Affiliation: Judaism
- Rite: Unaffiliated
- Ecclesiastical or organisational status: Baptist church (1829 - 1908); Synagogue (since 1910)
- Leadership: Rabbi Nathan Kamesar; Rabbi Avi Winokur (Emeritus); Cantor Jessi Roemer; Sahar Oz, Executive Director
- Status: Active

Location
- Location: 418 Spruce Street, Philadelphia, Pennsylvania
- Country: United States
- Coordinates: 39°56′42″N 75°08′58″W

Architecture
- Architects: Thomas Ustick Walter (1829); Henry Magaziner (1968); James A. Oleg Kruhly (1985)
- Type: Church
- Established: 1967 (as a congregation)
- Completed: 1829 (as a church); 1910 (as a synagogue)
- Direction of façade: North

Website
- societyhillsynagogue.org

Society Hill Synagogue is an independent Jewish congregation and synagogue located in the Society Hill section of Center City, Philadelphia, Pennsylvania, in the United States.

The synagogue is home to a 432-household congregation with Shabbat and holiday services, a preschool for children 18 months to 5 years old, a Hebrew school for early childhood learning through high school grades, adult education, social and communal activities, impactful social action, and engaging intergenerational programs.

== History ==
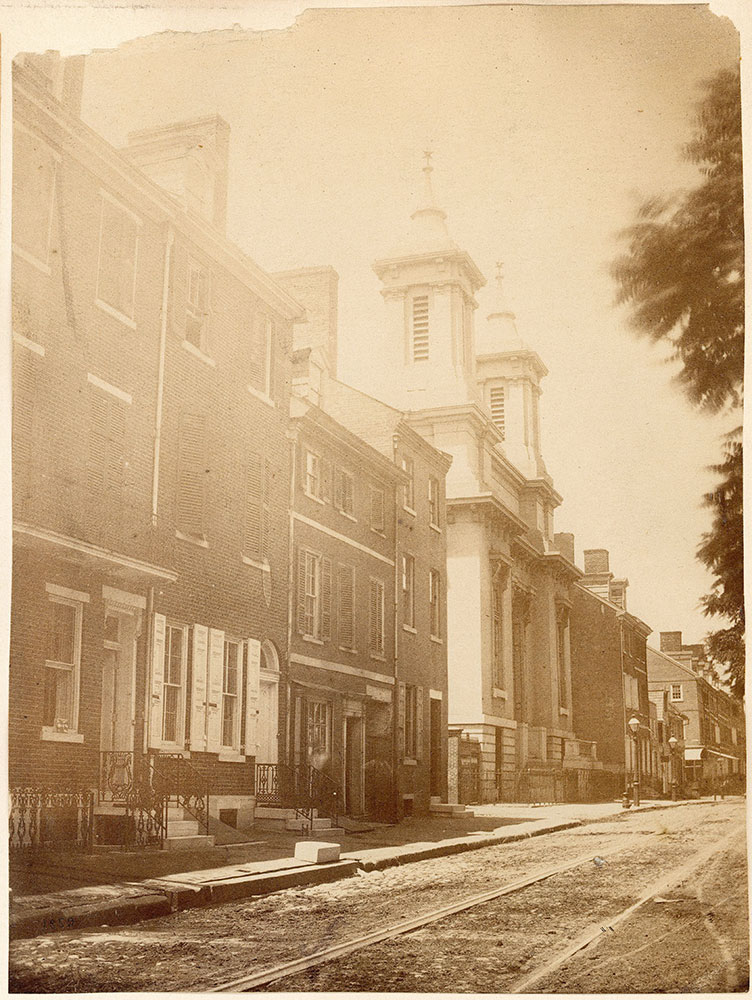
Spruce Street Baptist Church, south side of Spruce Street above 4th Street in 1859

Society Hill Synagogue is located at 418 Spruce Street. The building was designed by architect Thomas Ustick Walter in 1829 to serve as the home of the Spruce Street Baptist Church. Congregation Beth Hamedrash Hagadol Nusach Ashkenaz purchased the building in 1910. Within three years, the synagogue's official name was changed to the Roumanian American Congregation, also known as "Or Chodash-Agudas Achim" (New Light-Union of Brethren). That congregation was succeeded by Society Hill Synagogue, which continues to operate in the historic property and built the synagogue's adjacent Paula Kline Learning Center in 2021. The historic building is located within the Society Hill Historic District that was listed on the National Register of Historic Places in June 1971.

=== Spruce Street Baptist Church ===
Former members of First Baptist Church commissioned Thomas Ustick Walter to design the building at 418 Spruce Street in 1829. Walter also served as clerk of the church and superintendent of the Sunday school. In 1851, the church was enlarged, and a new façade with an attic story was designed by Walter with cupolas over the side bays of the façade. The congregation made additions to the rear of the building in 1871 and 1877.

Spruce Street Baptist Church moved to 50th and Spruce Streets in 1908, and in 1963 to Newtown Square where it continues as an active congregation.

=== Great Roumanian Shul ===
The building was sold at auction in 1910 and was purchased by the Roumanian American Congregation, which represented the merger of Or Chodash and Agudas Achim Congregations. Or Chodash was organized in 1886 as a beneficial society with daily services held in the second floor at 512 S. Third Street. Agudas Achim was organized in 1905.

The synagogue became commonly known as the Great Roumanian Shul (Yiddish: דיא גרויסע רומענישע שוהל). It served the Philadelphia Jewish Quarter's Eastern European Jews in general, and was the center for the city's Roumanian Jewish community and fraternal organizations, hosting meetings and speakers. The Roumanian synagogue hosted Dr. Wilhelm Filderman for a mass meeting during a visit to Philadelphia in March 1926.

Society Hill declined in the years following World War II. Immigrant Jewish communities assimilated, moved to suburbs, membership declined, and by the 1960s, the synagogue building had fallen into disrepair.

=== Society Hill Synagogue ===
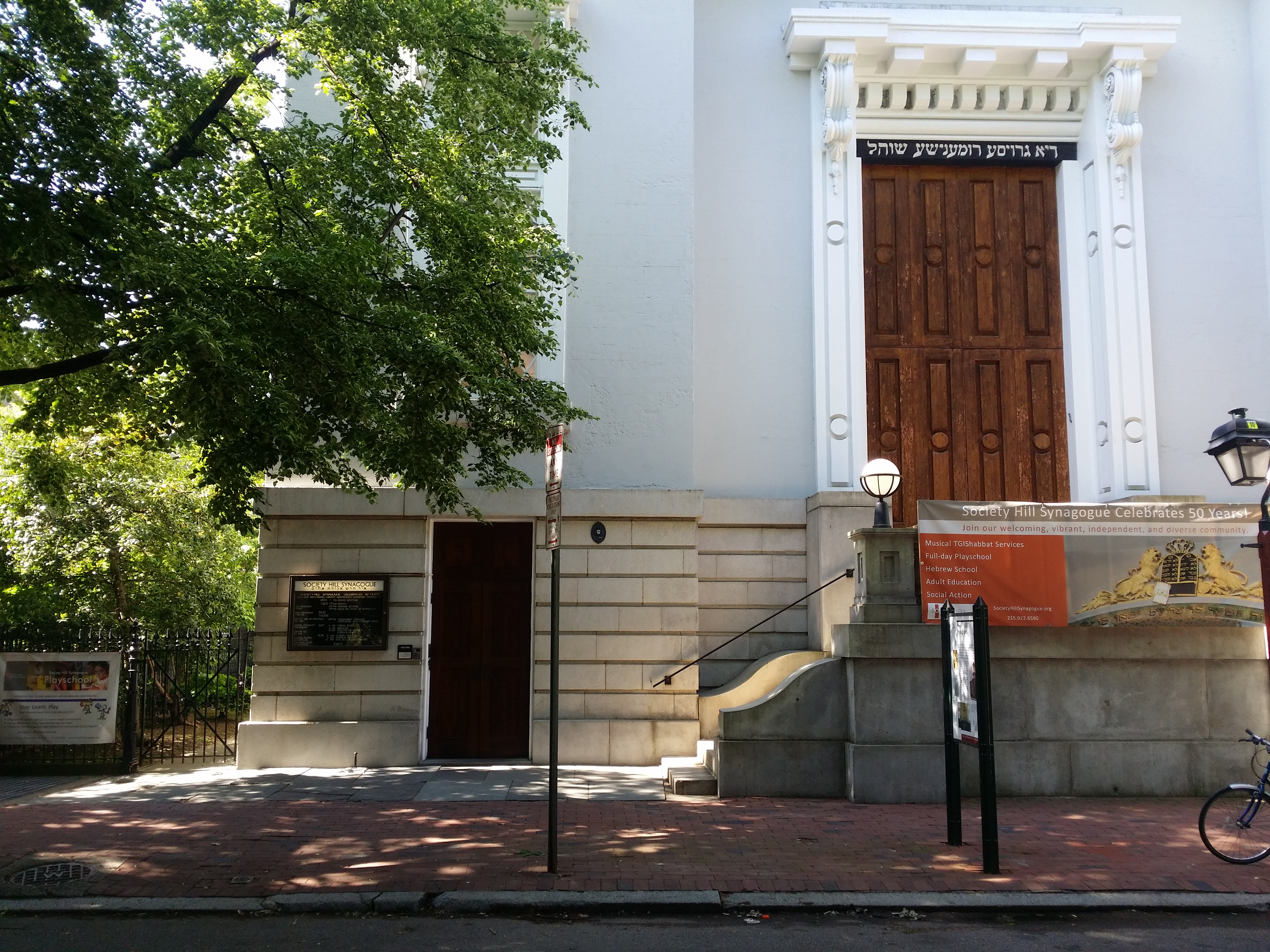
Society Hill Synagogue (2016)

In the 1960s, a new community of Jews in the Society Hill neighborhood were looking for a spiritual home. This new congregation purchased the building in 1967.

Restoration began in 1968 under the supervision of architect Henry J. Magaziner. The restoration cost $300,000 and included updates to the 1829 building, repair of Walter's façade, and the addition of air-conditioning, a contemporary kitchen, and a new social area. There were approximately 100 member families at the time. Additional work in 1971 was directed by Cauffman, Wilkenson & Pepper, with John Milner. The building is listed as a Philadelphia City Landmark and is on the state and National Registers of Historic Places.

Society Hill hired Larry Fader as cantor in October 1971. The synagogue opened its preschool to ages 2½ to 5 year olds in 1972.

On New Year's Eve, December 31, 1975, the Liberty Bell was moved to a new pavilion across from Independence Hall at the dawn of the Bicentennial year. In celebration of the Liberty Bell's move, and in celebration of the Bicentennial year, Congregation Mikveh Israel, still at Broad and York Streets, sponsored a joint New Year Eve's service with Society Hill Synagogue at Society Hill's building.

In 1985, architect James A. Oleg Kruhly designed a new addition. In 2005, the synagogue completed more than $80,000 worth of interior work, which included adding a permanent Beit Midrash.

The synagogue purchased the building next door, to its west, to add classrooms in 2007, and in 2009 secured a grant for repairs to the envelope of the 19th century sanctuary and annex. Between 2007 and 2019, Society Hill Synagogue raised more than $3 million in order to purchase its neighboring building and undertake major construction and renovation throughout its two buildings. Construction began in 2020 and was completed in 2021. In June 2021, the synagogue opened its new adjacent three-story Paula Kline Learning Center, which is connected to the historic synagogue building by a multistory gallery annex. The construction and space improvements expanded the historic building's Social Hall, renovated the Beit Midrash, built six new classrooms, developed a large private courtyard to the synagogue's south, and added an Americans with Disabilities Act-compliant elevator and ADA-compliant restrooms.

The congregation is independent, and its services are based on Conservative liturgy while incorporating influences from the Reconstructionist, Renewal, and Reform movements, and beyond. Society Hill Synagogue embraces its diverse membership, including interfaith couples and families, LGBTQ+ people, people of color, and people of all abilities.

Ivan Caine served as Rabbi from the congregation's founding in 1967 until 2001. In the mid-1970s, Rabbi Caine also served as a part-time Rabbi to Congregation Kesher Israel around the corner in the neighborhood. Cantor Alan Cohn served the synagogue from 1974 through 2000.

Avi Winokur served as Rabbi from 2001 to 2020. Nathan Kamesar was hired as Associate Rabbi in 2018 and succeeded Rabbi Winokur as Rabbi in July 2020. Hazzan Jessi Roemer has served as Cantor since 2018. The synagogue has grown from 275 member families in 2020 to more than 400 families in September 2025 and 420 in April 2026. Friday night Shabbat services regularly attract 60 to 80 attendees, and Saturday morning Shabbat services bring together more than 125 participants weekly.

United States Senator Arlen Specter and Philadelphia City Council member Joan Specter were members of the congregation in the 1980s.

== See also ==
- History of the Jews in Pennsylvania
- National Register of Historic Places listings in Center City, Philadelphia
