= Kesher Israel =

Kesher Israel is the name of various synagogues:

- Congregation Kesher Israel (Philadelphia), Pennsylvania
- Kesher Israel Congregation (Harrisburg, Pennsylvania)
- Kesher Israel (Washington, D.C.), also known as the Georgetown Synagogue
