= Little Saigon, Philadelphia =

Neighborhood in Philadelphia, US

Little Saigon
- Neighborhood of Philadelphia
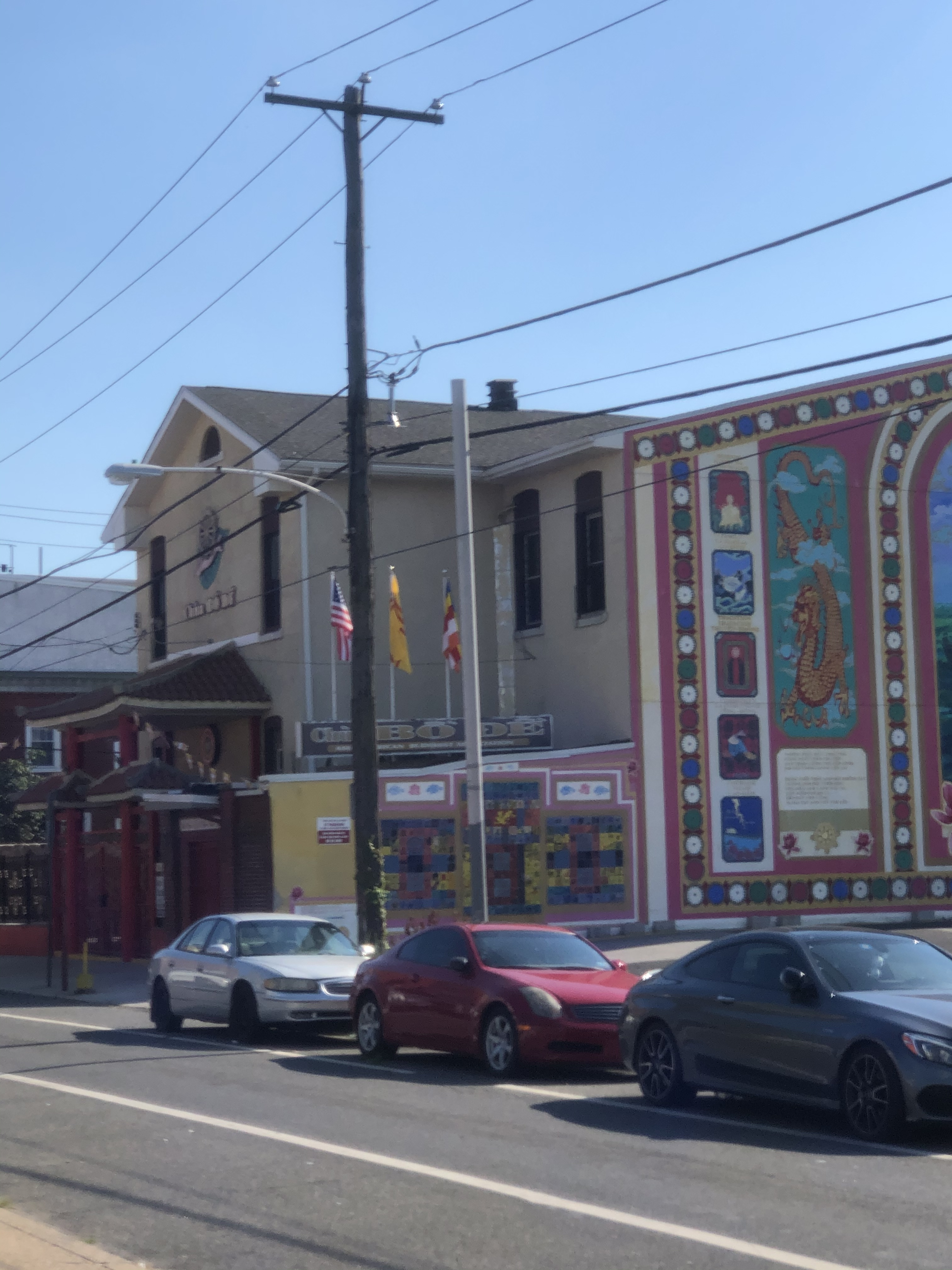
- Vietnamese temple near Washington Avenue

- Location within Philadelphia
- Country: United States
- State: Pennsylvania
- County: Philadelphia
- City: Philadelphia
- ZIP Code: 19147
- Area codes: 215, 267 and 445

One of the largest Vietnamese neighborhoods in the United States is Philadelphia's Little Saigon, located in Passyunk Square, a neighborhood in South Philadelphia. This heart of the Philadelphia metropolitan area's rapidly growing Vietnamese community is centered on the intersection of S. Eighth Street and Washington Avenue in South Philadelphia, with "one of the largest Vietnamese populations on the east coast," and is a district where "... neon signs lure shoppers into grocery stores, restaurants, and karaoke bars set back from the street in low-rise concrete strip malls. Shoppers pushing carts laden with rice noodles, bean cakes and imported spices and sauces pack suburban-style parking lots behind the complexes." The author further states that the Vietnamese are now (as of 2013) the largest ethnic community in the Washington Avenue/Passyunk Square section of the city and that the entire Vietnamese population of Philadelphia is larger than that of New York City.

Southwest Philadelphia and Northeast Philadelphia also contain Vietnamese American neighborhoods. Mimicking Little Saigon is Baby Saigon, a small Vietnamese neighborhood located in the Whitman neighborhood of South Philadelphia, bordering Cambodia Town. Meanwhile, the Vietnamese community has additionally expanded eastward across the Delaware River to Camden, Cherry Hill, Woodlynne, and as far as Atlantic City in the neighboring U.S. state of New Jersey.

== Background ==
According to Ariel Diliberto, a Temple University anthropology scholar, "... the strip malls are typical of Vietnamese business communities across the U.S." Diliberto points out that the architecture "... is an idealization of American enterprise among South Vietnamese frustrated under communism and inspired by the 'simple, geometric high-rise buildings' constructed in Vietnamese towns and cities during the Vietnam war." Unlike other Vietnamese enclaves in the US, "... there’s no gaudy, generically 'Asian' archway entreating the passersby to explore, just a string of unannounced shopping malls and a smattering of nearby businesses integrated into the ever-evolving immigrant territory of the Italian Market and the building materials bazaar along Washington Avenue."

== History ==
Starting from the 1990s, the Vietnamese shopping areas started with Hoa Binh Plaza, followed by Wing Phat Plaza, both of which were dwarfed in 1998 with the construction of the New World Plaza and 1st Oriental Market. According to Dilberto who quotes Pappas that the origins of the Little Saigon closely follow the patterns seen in "... Westminster (a suburb of LA) and Falls Church (a suburb of DC)."

== See also ==
- Vietnamese American
- Chinatown, Philadelphia
- Koreatown, Philadelphia
- Italian Market, Philadelphia, a neighborhood within which Little Saigon is intertwined.
- Washington Avenue Historic District (Philadelphia, Pennsylvania)

== Gallery ==
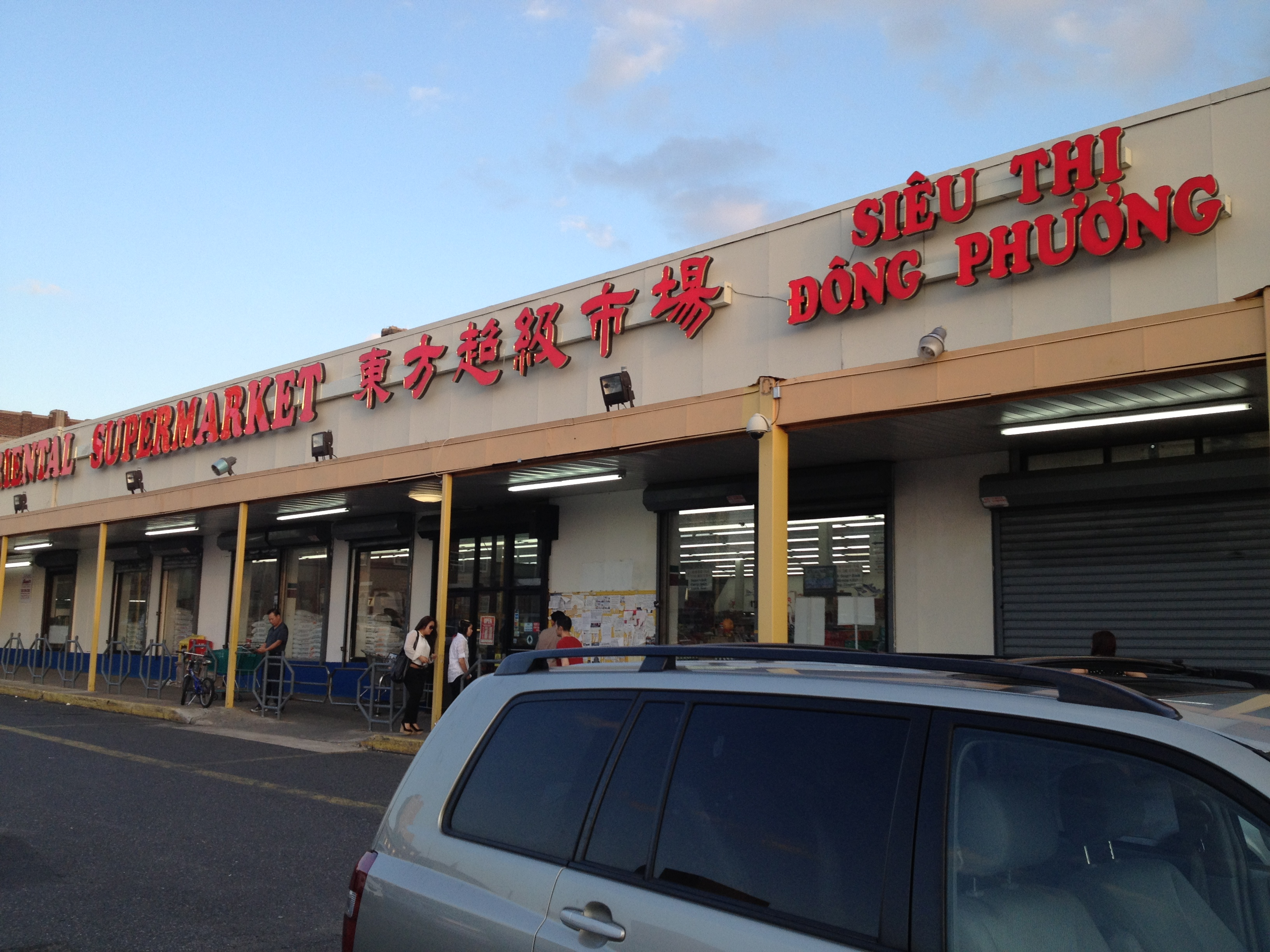
1st Oriental Supermarket at 6th and Washington

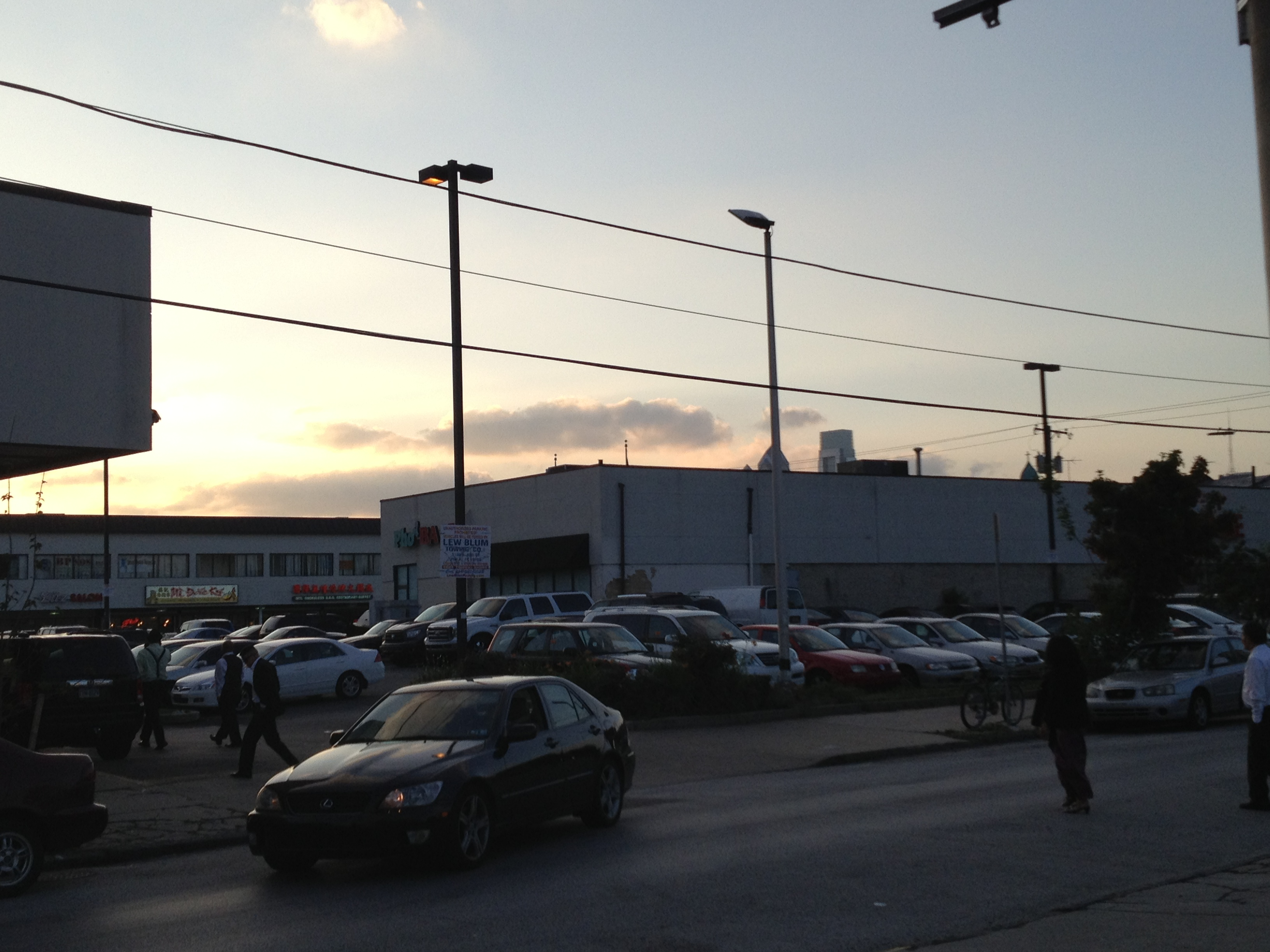
Vietnamese Shopping Center
