= Cambodian Americans =

Americans of Cambodian ancestry

ជនជាតិខ្មែរអាមេរិកាំង
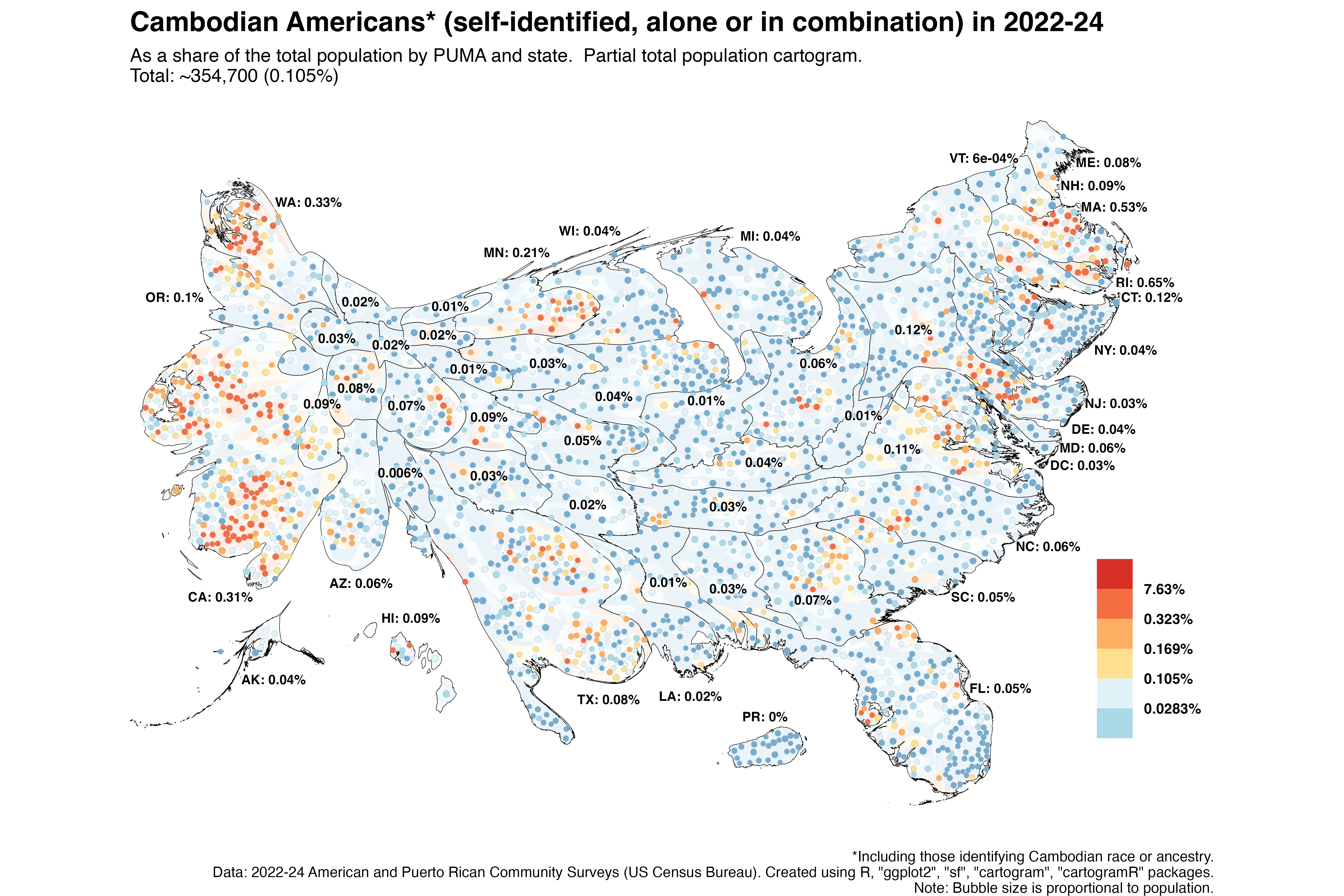

Total population
- 361,760 (ancestry or ethnic origin, 2023); 151,167 (born in Cambodia, 2023)

Regions with significant populations
- California (Los Angeles, Long Beach, San Francisco, Oakland, Richmond, Santa Rosa, San Jose, Fresno, Stockton, Modesto), Massachusetts (Boston, Lowell, Lynn), Minnesota (Minneapolis–St. Paul, Brooklyn Park, Rochester), New York (New York City, Utica), Texas (Dallas, Houston), Rhode Island (Providence), Pennsylvania (Philadelphia), Colorado (Denver, Colorado Springs), Georgia (Stone Mountain, Riverdale) and Washington (Seattle, Tacoma)

Languages
- Khmer, American English, Cham, French

Religion
- Theravada Buddhism (majority); Islam, Christianity, and other religions (minority)

Related ethnic groups
- Khmers, Vietnamese Cambodians, Chinese Cambodians, Asian Americans

Cambodian Americans, (Note: Khmer: ជនជាតិខ្មែរអាមេរិកាំង, romanized: Chônchéatĕ Khmêr Amérĭkăng; Khmer pronunciation: [cɔnciət kʰmae ʔaːmeːrikaŋ]) also Khmer Americans, are Americans of Cambodian or Khmer ancestry. In addition, Cambodian Americans are also Americans with ancestry of other ethnic groups of Cambodia, such as the Chams and Chinese Cambodians.

According to the 2010 US Census, an estimated 276,667 people of Cambodian descent reside in the United States, with most of the population concentrated in California, Pennsylvania and Massachusetts.

After the fall of Phnom Penh to the Khmer Rouge regime in 1975, few Cambodians were able to escape; it was not until after the regime was overthrown in 1979 did large waves of Cambodians begin immigrating to the US as refugees. Between 1975 and 1994, nearly 158,000 Cambodians were admitted. About 149,000 of them entered the country as refugees, and 6,000 entered as immigrants and 2,500 as humanitarian and public interest parolees. To encourage rapid cultural assimilation and to spread the economic impact, the US government dispersed the refugees into various cities and states throughout the country. However, once established enough to be able to communicate and travel, many Cambodians began migrating to certain places where the climate was more like home, they knew friends and relatives had been sent, or there were rumored to be familiar jobs or higher government benefits. Consequently, large communities of Cambodians took root in cities such as Long Beach, Fresno, Modesto and Stockton in California; Providence; Philadelphia, Pennsylvania; Cleveland, Ohio; Lynn and Lowell in Massachusetts; Tacoma, Seattle and Portland in the Pacific Northwest.

Since 1994, Cambodians admitted into the United States have entered the country as immigrants and not as refugees, but the number per year is small. Most of the increase in the ethnic Cambodian population can be attributed to American-born children of Cambodian immigrants or of newer people of Cambodian descent. Although the Cambodians were spared from the destruction of their home country, whose tragedies maintained a lasting impact into the 21st century, they would come to face newer adversities and hardships in America.

The 2010 census counted 276,667 persons of Cambodian descent in the United States, up from 206,052 in 2000. Of them, 231,616 (84%) are all-Cambodian and 45,051 part-Cambodian.

== Demographics ==
The states with the highest concentration of Cambodian American residents are Rhode Island (0.5%; 5,176), Massachusetts (0.4%; 25,387), Washington (0.3%; 19,101), California (0.2%; 86,244), and Minnesota (0.2%; 7,850).

=== West Coast ===
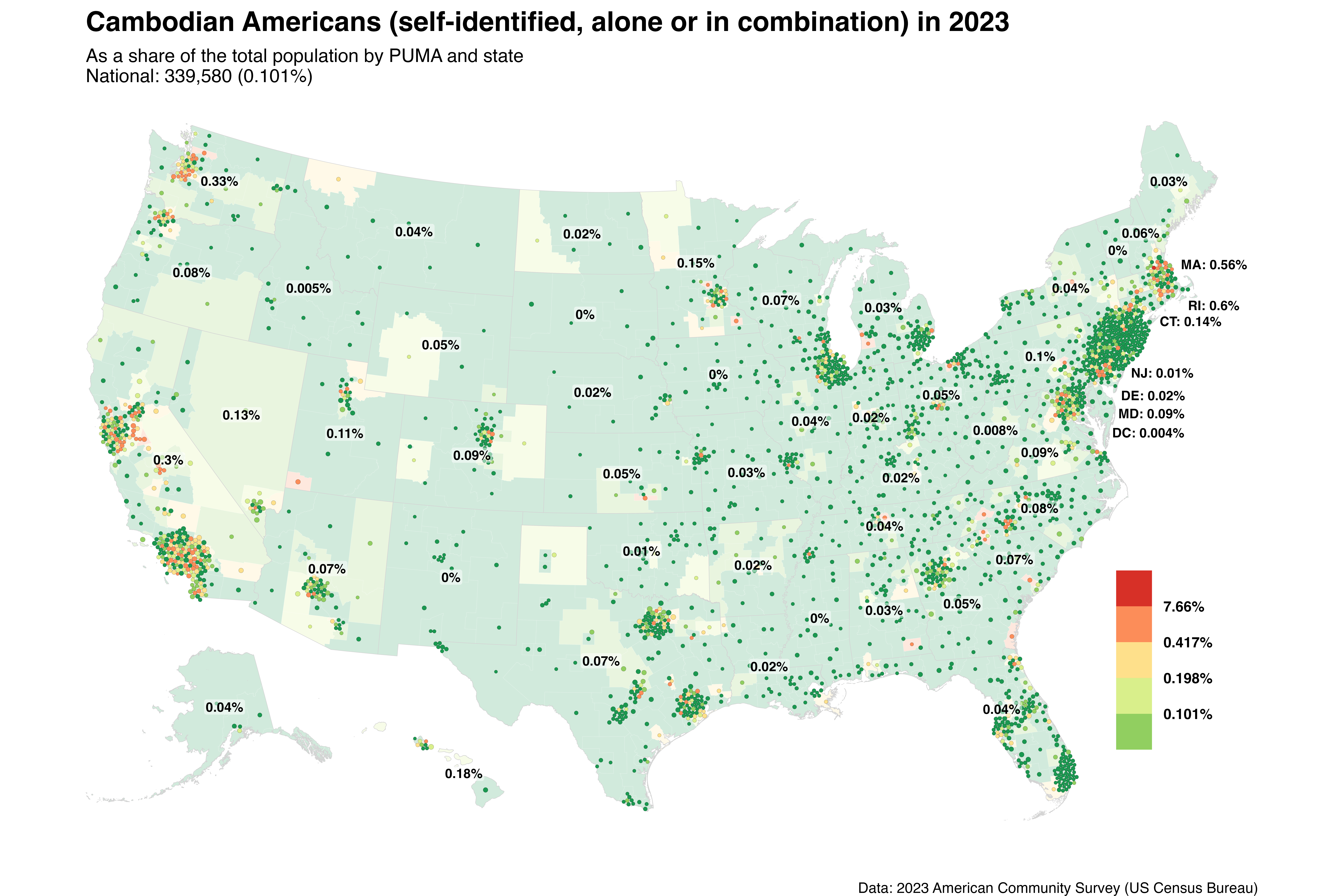
Cambodian Americans

In Southern California, there is a large Cambodian population in Long Beach, and smaller yet significant communities of Cambodians are present in Los Angeles and San Diego metropolitan areas. Four percent of Long Beach's population is of Cambodian descent, mainly concentrated on the city's east section, where there is a Cambodia Town neighborhood. Long Beach, California, has the highest population of people of Cambodian ancestry outside of Cambodia itself. The Pueblo Del Rio housing projects in South Los Angeles were home to around 200 Cambodian families in the 1980s, and as of 2010, remains a smaller but sizable Cambodian American community. The Los Angeles Chinatown has more than 600 Cambodian residents. Santa Ana, California, is 0.5% Cambodian American. The City Heights neighborhood in eastern San Diego has a large concentration of Cambodians. One of the main legacies of Cambodian Americans in Southern California are local donut shops that package their donuts in pink boxes, which are attributed to Ted Ngoy and Ning Yen after helping other Cambodians set up donut shops.

In Northern California, Stockton, Modesto, and Oakland have significant Cambodian populations, while San Jose, Santa Rosa and Sacramento have sizable communities as well. Outside of California, the Pacific Northwest is home to another large Cambodian settlement, specifically in cities such as Tacoma, where Cambodians enumerate at thousands, or 1.6% of the population. There are also growing Cambodian American communities in Las Vegas, Nevada; Phoenix, Arizona; Salt Lake City, Utah; and Denver, Colorado. In Utah, there is a community of Cambodians in West Valley City.

=== East Coast ===
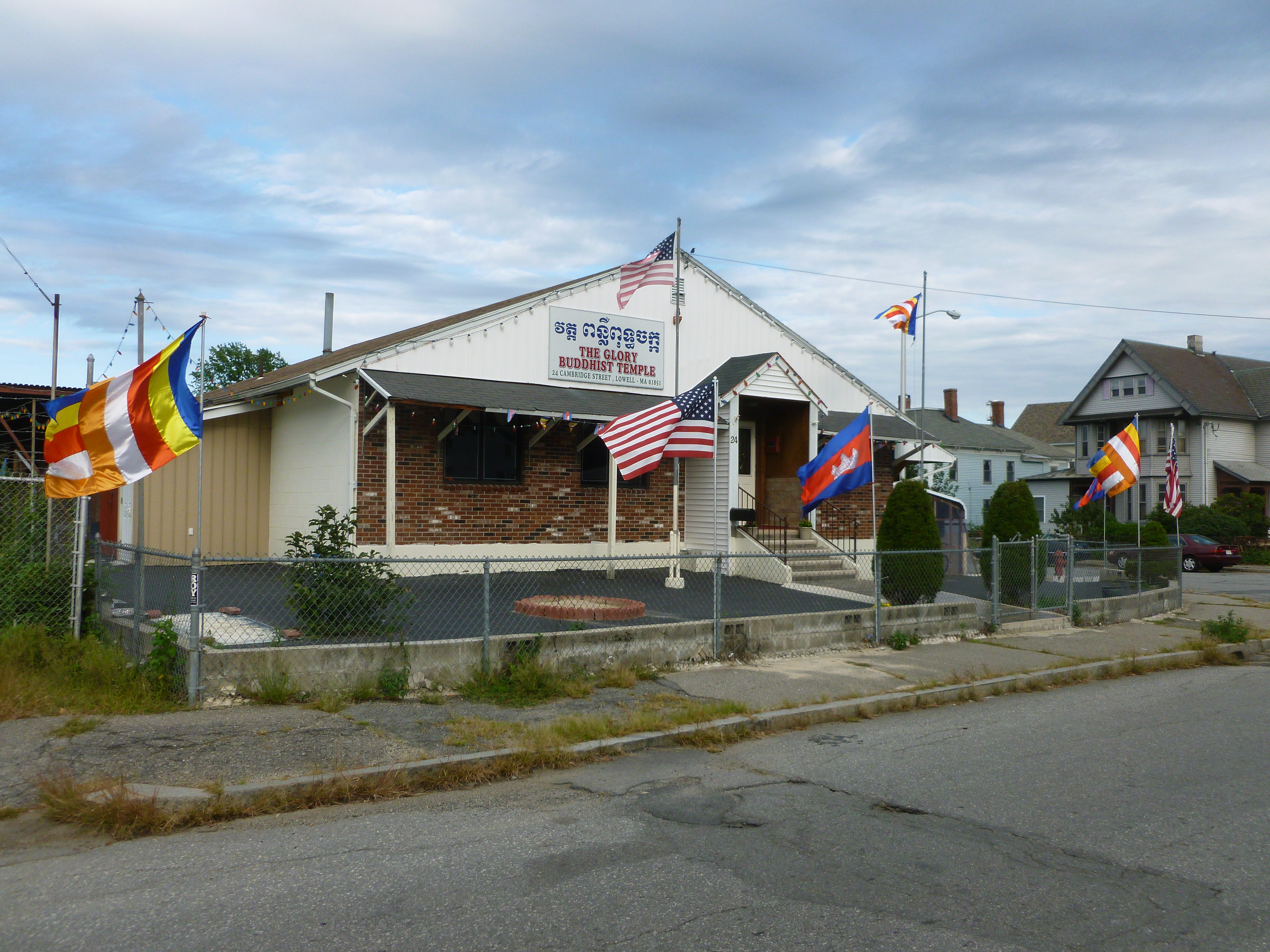
Glory Buddhist Temple, one of many examples of Cambodian-American culture in Lowell, Massachusetts

Lowell, Massachusetts, has the second highest population of Cambodian Americans in the U.S., and is a center of Cambodian population on the east coast. 13% of its population is of Cambodian descent. Cambodian immigrants settled in Lowell during the mid-1980s, where they opened dozens of small businesses. Lynn, Massachusetts, which is nearby Lowell, has the third largest Cambodian American population. Within New England, Providence, Rhode Island, and Portland, Maine (647 residents; 1%), also contain sizable Cambodian American populations. Outside of New England, New York City, Philadelphia, Pennsylvania, and the Washington, D.C. metropolitan area have many residents of Cambodian descent. 480 people of Cambodian descent reside in Utica, New York.

=== South ===
In the South, there is a sizable community of Cambodian Americans in Jacksonville, Florida. 1,700 people of Cambodian descent live in Jacksonville. In Spartanburg County, South Carolina, there are 1,123 Cambodian Americans (0.4% of the county). There are very sizable Cambodian American communities in Charlotte, North Carolina, and the Atlanta metropolitan area. There is a Cambodian community in the New Orleans metropolitan area, especially in the town of Buras, Louisiana, which is 9% Cambodian. Many Cambodian immigrants in Plaquemines Parish, Louisiana, are employed as shrimpers and fishermen. There are some Cambodian Americans in Marietta, Georgia, Stone Mountain, Georgia and in Riverdale, Georgia. In Riverdale, Georgia they have a Cambodia Town. There is a nonprofit organization in Georgia called the Cambodian American Association of Georgia.

=== Midwest ===
The Minneapolis–Saint Paul, Minnesota, metropolitan area has been a home to many Southeast Asian refugees, mainly Hmong, but also have thousands of Cambodian American residents. Denver, Colorado, has a growing population of Cambodian Americans with a population of 2,399 and growing as of 2016. Rochester, Minnesota, is 1.2% Cambodian American. As of 2010, there were 1,600 Cambodian Americans living in Columbus, Ohio (0.2%), many of whom live in the Hilltop neighborhood. In Chicago, Illinois, there is a Cambodian community in the Albany Park neighborhood.

== Academic study of the community ==
Aside from personal memoirs of coming to America, such as those by Loung Ung, a few books have been dedicated to studying the Cambodian American population, such as Khmer American: Identity and Moral Education in a Diasporic Community by Nancy J. Smith-Hefner. The book is an anthropological study of Khmer refugee families, largely from the perspective of the parental generation, residing in metropolitan Boston and eastern Massachusetts. This book was one of the early books among the few circulating that talks about this diasporic community. It exhibits some understanding of both traditional Khmer culture and contemporary American society, but it is not a historical study of Khmer Americans.

A more recent book is Buddha Is Hiding, written by Aiwha Ong, an ethnographic study that tells the story of Cambodian Americans and their experiences of American citizenship. The study primarily investigated Khmer refugees in Oakland and the San Francisco Bay Area. The experiences portrayed in the book exemplify what most Cambodian refugees face when dealing with American institutions such as health care systems, welfare, law, police force, church, and school. The book reveals, through extensive ethnographic dialogues, how Cambodian refugees interpret and negotiate American culture, often at the expense of their own Theravada Buddhist cultural upbringing.

Survivors: Cambodian Refugees in the United States, written by Sucheng Chan, is a multidisciplinary study of Cambodian Americans drawing on interviews with community leaders, government officials, and staff members in community agencies as well as average Cambodian Americans to capture perspectives from a variety of socioeconomic backgrounds.

Not Just Victims: Conversations with Cambodian Community Leaders in the United States, by Sucheng Chan, is a collection of oral history interviews. The interviews, mostly collected in the 1990s, describe the challenges faced by the Cambodian community, and the various organizational efforts to assist with refugee resettlement, cultural assimilation, and social services. It also provides a brief history of the Cambodian genocide and diaspora, and a chapter about the Khmer Krom in the United States.

== Issues ==
=== Lack of education ===
According to the 2000 census, Cambodian American populations had a lower level of education compared to other populations in the United States, with 53.4% of Cambodian Americans over the age of 25 not possessing a high school diploma, compared to 19.6% of all Americans.

=== Poverty/ Socioeconomic Status/ Demographics ===
In 2023, Cambodian Americans had a high median household income of $83,452 which was higher than the total population and Non-Hispanic Whites. However, Cambodian Americans had a lower per capita Income of $35,725.

In 2023, Cambodian Americans had a low poverty rate of 11.8%; this has decreased since 2010. This was lower than the total population. This shows that over the years Cambodian Americans have had socioeconomic upwards mobility. However the community is still largely less educated, as 25.6% of Cambodian Americans only had a high school diploma or less.

In 2000, Cambodian American families reported a median household income of $36,152. A 2008 NYU study reported that 29.3% of the Cambodian American community lived under the poverty line. That was higher than the American average of people living below the poverty line, which, in 2011, was recorded as 16% of all Americans.

In 2014, it was reported that Cambodia Town, Long Beach, California, the only officially recognized ethnic enclave of Cambodian Americans, had a poverty rate of 32.4%. That was a little over twice the average of America society as a whole, which was 16% according to a 2011 study by the government.

In 2014, a factfinder census, with Americans' per capita income being divided by ethnic groups, Cambodian Americans were revealed to have a per capita income of only $20,182, below the American average of $25,825.

The Personal Responsibility and Work Opportunity Reconciliation Act, which was signed into law by President Bill Clinton in 1996, resulted in many legal immigrants losing the federal aid that they had been receiving from the Social Security Administration. That especially affected Cambodian immigrants and other Southeast Asians, who were the largest per capita race or ethnic group receiving public assistance in the United States. Under the Indochina Migration and Refugee Assistance Act of 1975, many Southeast Asian refugees were placed on federal welfare rolls. That was intended as a temporary measure until they integrated, but by 1996, they had been stripped of their refugee status. However, nearly 80 percent of California's Southeast Asian population was living in poverty and/or welfare-dependent. That made the law have a large impact on Cambodian Americans and other citizens of Southeast Asian descent. That is a contributing factor to the high poverty rates of Cambodian Americans since the first major wave of Cambodian refugees emigrated to the United States in 1975.

=== Assimilation ===
Cambodians faced many difficulties upon settling in the United States, such as having few transferable job skills, lack of English, and having experienced trauma as refugees and genocide survivors. The factors greatly impacted overall household income after resettlement. Many refugees arrived without formal education since the educated and professional classes were targeted during the genocide. That contributed to the difficulty in learning to speak English and in assimilating to the American educational system.

Another common phenomenon experienced by some Cambodian American refugees is a lack of familiarity with the history of their homeland. That is prevalent among refugees who were young children when they emigrated to the US and are now adults. Because of their age, they are not able to remember or understand the history of Cambodia that led to their family's migration. Contributing to this unfamiliarity are the facts that Cambodian history is rarely taught in American public schools, and that many older refugees refuse to discuss the horrors they witnessed in Cambodia. Their racial and ethnic identity has also provoked social barriers between them and other immigrant groups and American ethnic groups.

=== Poor mental health ===
It was estimated in 1990, five years after most arrived to the US, nearly 81% of Cambodians in America met the criteria for major affective disorder, which encompasses depression and generalized anxiety, accounting for the largest subgroup of Southeast Asians afflicted by mental health problems at the time.

=== Physical health ===
One study conducted among Cambodian Americans residing in Long Beach, California, found that 13.0% of the adult respondents were current cigarette smokers. When the study was broken down by gender, 24.4% of men included in the study were smokers, and 5.4% of women included in the study were smokers. The prevalence of smoking was found to be higher in Cambodian American males than in other males residing in California. Additionally, smoking rates are estimated to be higher among Cambodian Americans than among other Asian American groups, with the prevalence of cigarette smoking among the aggregate Asian population in the US around 9.6%, with men and women combined.

== Culture ==
=== Cambodia Towns ===
Cambodian culture is preserved in the various Cambodia Towns throughout the United States, in Cambodian owned restaurants, businesses, and pharmacies. In Cambodia Town in Long Beach, California, the Homeland Cultural Center offers classes in Khmer martial arts. Khmer language classes are offered at the Mark Twain Neighborhood Library. Smot, a traditional form of Buddhist chanting, has been taught at The Khmer Arts Academy.

=== Museums ===
Two museums in the US are devoted to the story of Cambodians in America: the Cambodian Cultural Museum and Killing Fields Memorial in Seattle and the National Cambodian Heritage Museum and Killing Fields Memorial in Chicago, both founded in 2004. The Seattle museum was founded by Dara Duong, a survivor of the Cambodian genocide.

== Politics ==
In 2012, 62% of registered Cambodian Americans voted in the presidential election, of which 75% voted for Barack Obama. In the 2016 presidential election, 78% of Cambodian Americans voted for Hillary Clinton.

== See also ==
- Preah Buddha Rangsey Temple located in Philadelphia, Pennsylvania
- Wat Khmer Palelai Monastery located in Philadelphia, Pennsylvania
- List of Cambodian Americans
- List of U.S. cities with large Cambodian-American populations
- Deportation of Cambodian-Americans
- Cambodian Canadians
- Cambodians in France
- Cambodian Australians
- Cambodia–United States relations
- Cambodia Town, Long Beach, California

== Sources ==
- Bankston, Carl L., III. "Cambodian Americans." Gale Encyclopedia of Multicultural America, edited by Thomas Riggs, (3rd ed., vol. 1, Gale, 2014), pp. 381–393. Online
- Chan, Sucheng. Survivors: Cambodian Refugees in the United States (University of Illinois Press, 2004) online.
- Kim, Audrey U. Not just victims: Conversations with Cambodian community leaders in the United States (University of Illinois Press, 2003) online.
- Tang, Eric. Unsettled: Cambodian Refugees in the New York City Hyperghetto. (Philadelphia: Temple University Press, 2015). xiv, 220 pp.
- Wright, Wayne E. 2010. "Khmer as a Heritage Language in the United States: Historical Sketch, Current Realities, and Future Prospects" (Archive). Heritage Language Journal, 7(1). pp 117–147
