= Mekong NYC =

Non-profit organization in New York City

Mekong NYC is a nonprofit organization based in the Bronx, New York. The organization aims to improve the quality of life for the Southeast Asian community in the Bronx and throughout New York, which consists primarily of Vietnamese Americans and Cambodian Americans, through arts, culture, community organizing, and advocacy. Mekong NYC also hopes to provide a safety net for the Southeast Asian community by improving access to essential social services including Khmer and Vietnamese interpretation, advocacy in housing court, help with public assistance documents, and other safety net programs.

The organization's name is inspired by the Mekong River, which connects Vietnam and Cambodia. According to the organization, immigrants from these countries, who settled in the Bronx where housing was cheap, have often been "left without economic, social and linguistic support, resulting in a closed-off Southeast Asian community in the area that has remained disconnected from the surrounding borough and city for years."

== Board members ==
List of board members:

- Socheatta Meng, Mekong NYC Board Chair, Chief of Staff, New York City Council
- Carolyn Trần, Mekong NYC Board Treasurer, Chief of Staff, New York City Council
- Chhaya Chhoum, Executive Director, Mekong NYC
- Jeehae Fischer, Executive Director, Korean American Family Service Center
- Jules Nguyễn, Manager, Kirin Lin
- Ngô Thanh Nhàn, Ph.D. Linguistics, Vietnam Agent Orange Relief and Responsibility Campaign, and Visiting Scholar, New York University
- Joyce Wong, LCSW, Coordinator, Indochinese Mental Health Program Montefiore Medical Group Family Health Center
