= George Sharswood =

American politician and judge (1810-1883)

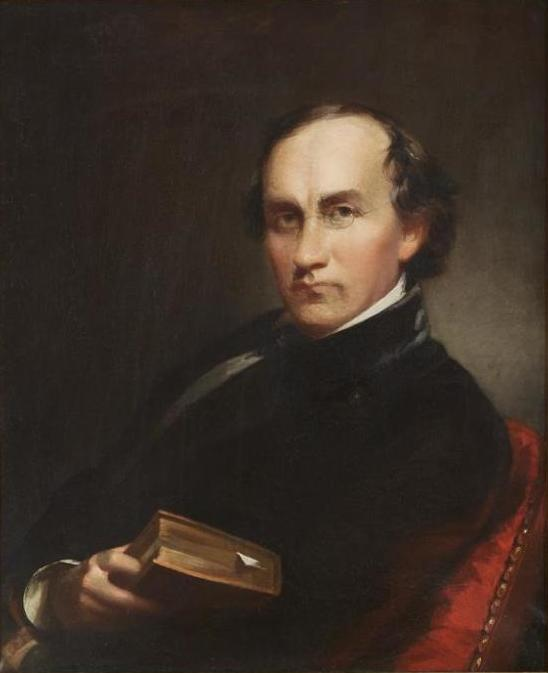

Member of the Pennsylvania House of Representatives
- In office 1837-1838
- In office 1842-1843

Select council for Philadelphia
- In office 1839-1840

Pennsylvania district judge
- In office 1845-1867

Associate justice of the Supreme Court of Pennsylvania
- In office 1868-1879

Chief justice of the Supreme Court of Pennsylvania
- In office 1879-1882
- Preceded by: Daniel Agnew
- Succeeded by: Ulysses Mercur

Personal details
- Born: July 7, 1810 Philadelphia, Pennsylvania, U.S.
- Died: May 28, 1883 (aged 72)
- Resting place: Laurel Hill Cemetery, Philadelphia, Pennsylvania, U.S.
- Party: Whig
- Education: University of Pennsylvania

George Sharswood (July 7, 1810 – May 28, 1883) was an American politician and judge. He served as a Whig member of the Pennsylvania House of Representatives from 1837 to 1838 and 1842 to 1843. He served on the select council for Philadelphia from 1839 to 1840, as a district judge in Pennsylvania from 1845 to 1867, as a justice on the Supreme Court of Pennsylvania from 1868 to 1879 and as chief justice from 1879 to 1882. He was a professor of law at the University of Pennsylvania Law School and served as Dean from 1852 to 1868.

== Early life and education ==
Sharswood was born in Philadelphia, Pennsylvania, on July 7, 1810. He attended the University of Pennsylvania at the age of 15 and graduated as valedictorian in 1828. He read law in the office of Joseph Reed Ingersoll and was admitted to the bar of the Commonwealth of Pennsylvania no September 5, 1831. He received honorary doctorate of laws degrees from Columbia College (now known as Columbia University) and the University of the City of New York (now known as New York University) in 1856.

== Career ==
He served as a Whig member of the Pennsylvania House of Representatives from 1837 to 1838 and again from 1842 to 1843. He served on the select council for Philadelphia from 1839 to 1840. He served as a district judge in Pennsylvania from 1845 to 1867.

In 1850, he became a professor of law at the University of Pennsylvania Law School. He was Dean of the Law School from 1852 to 1868.

In 1851, he was elected as a member to the American Philosophical Society.

He was appointed to the Supreme Court of Pennsylvania in 1868, and was named Chief Justice in the court in 1879. He retired in 1882.

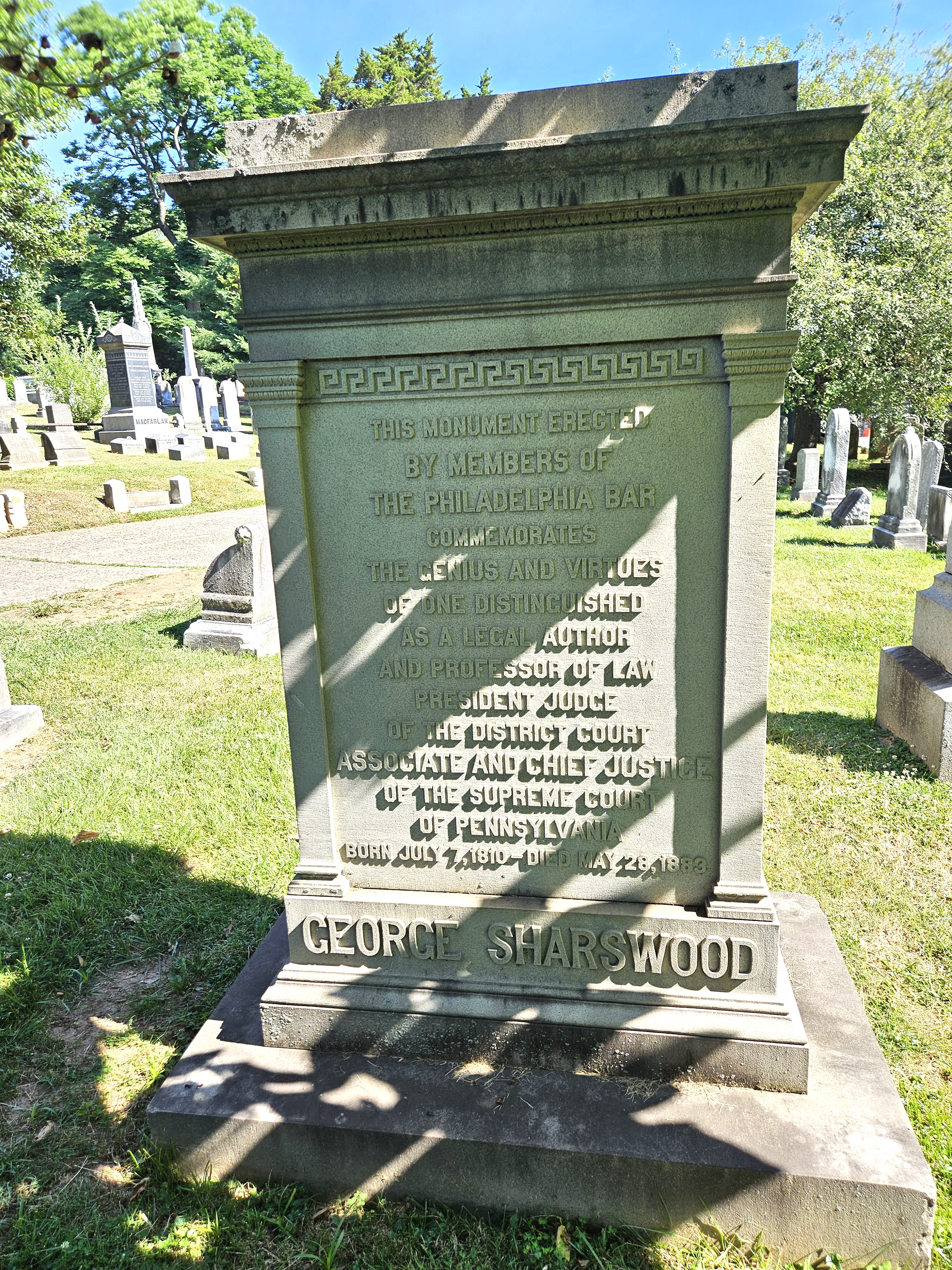
George Sharswood Grave in Laurel Hill Cemetery

Sharswood died on May 28, 1883, and was interred at Laurel Hill Cemetery, Section R, Plots L501 & 503.

== Legacy ==
The Liberty Ship SS George Sharswood served during World War II and was named in his honor.

The George Sharswood Fellowship was created in 2007 by the University of Pennsylvania Carey Law School for students interested in a career in legal academia.

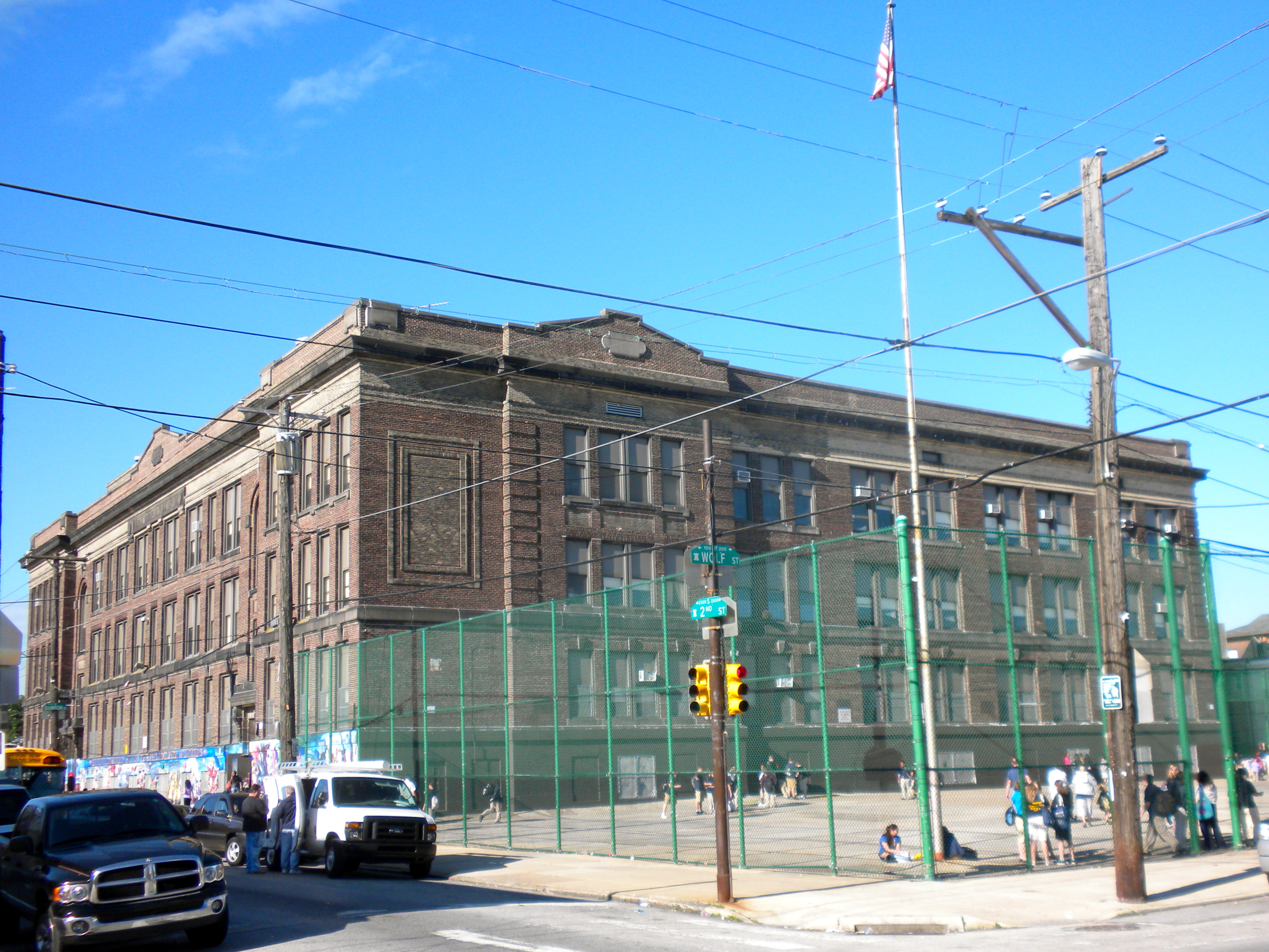
The George Sharswood School in the Whitman neighborhood of Philadelphia

In 1908, the George Sharswood School was established in the Whitman neighborhood of Philadelphia.

== Publications ==
- A Compend of Lectures on the Aims and Duties of the Profession of the Law. Delivered Before the Law Class of the University of Pennsylvania., Philadelphia: T. & J.W. Johnson, 1854
- The Common Law of Pennsylvania. A Lecture Read Before the Law Academy of Philadelphia, at the Opening of the Session of 1855-6., Philadelphia: L.R. Bailey, 1855
- Address Delivered at the University of Pennsylvania, Before the Society of Alumni, on the Occasion of Their Annual Celebration, December 10th, 1856, Philadelphia: King & Baird Printers, 1857
- Reviewed Work: Commentaries on the Laws of England, in Four Books by William Blackstone, George Sharswood, (1860), The North American Review, 90(187), 550-552.
- An Essay of Professional Ethics, Philadelphia: T. & J.W. Johnson & Co., 1884

Preceded by none; first	Dean of the University of Pennsylvania Law School; 1852–1868	Succeeded by E. Spencer Miller

Legal offices
Preceded by Daniel Agnew	Chief Justice of the Supreme Court of Pennsylvania; 1883–1887	Succeeded by Ulysses Mercur
