= Philadelphia Koreatown =

Neighborhood of Pennsylvania, United States

Koreatown
- Neighborhood of Philadelphia
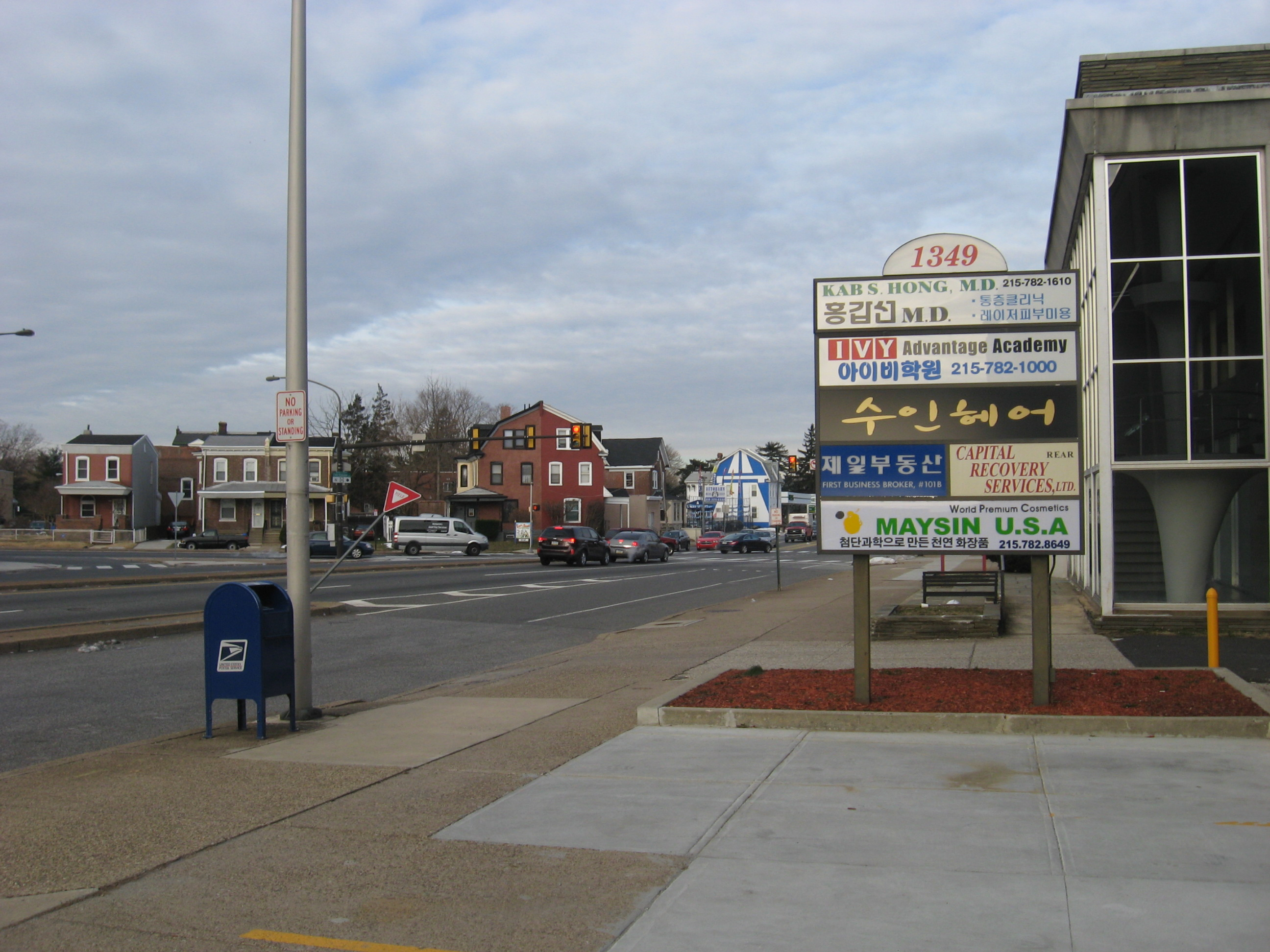
- Professional offices along Cheltenham Avenue in Cheltenham, one of several places in the Philadelphia metropolitan area that has a significant Korean population. In the background is the northern terminus of Broad Street.

- Location within Philadelphia
- Country: United States
- State: Pennsylvania
- County: Philadelphia
- City: Philadelphia
- Area codes: 215, 267 and 445

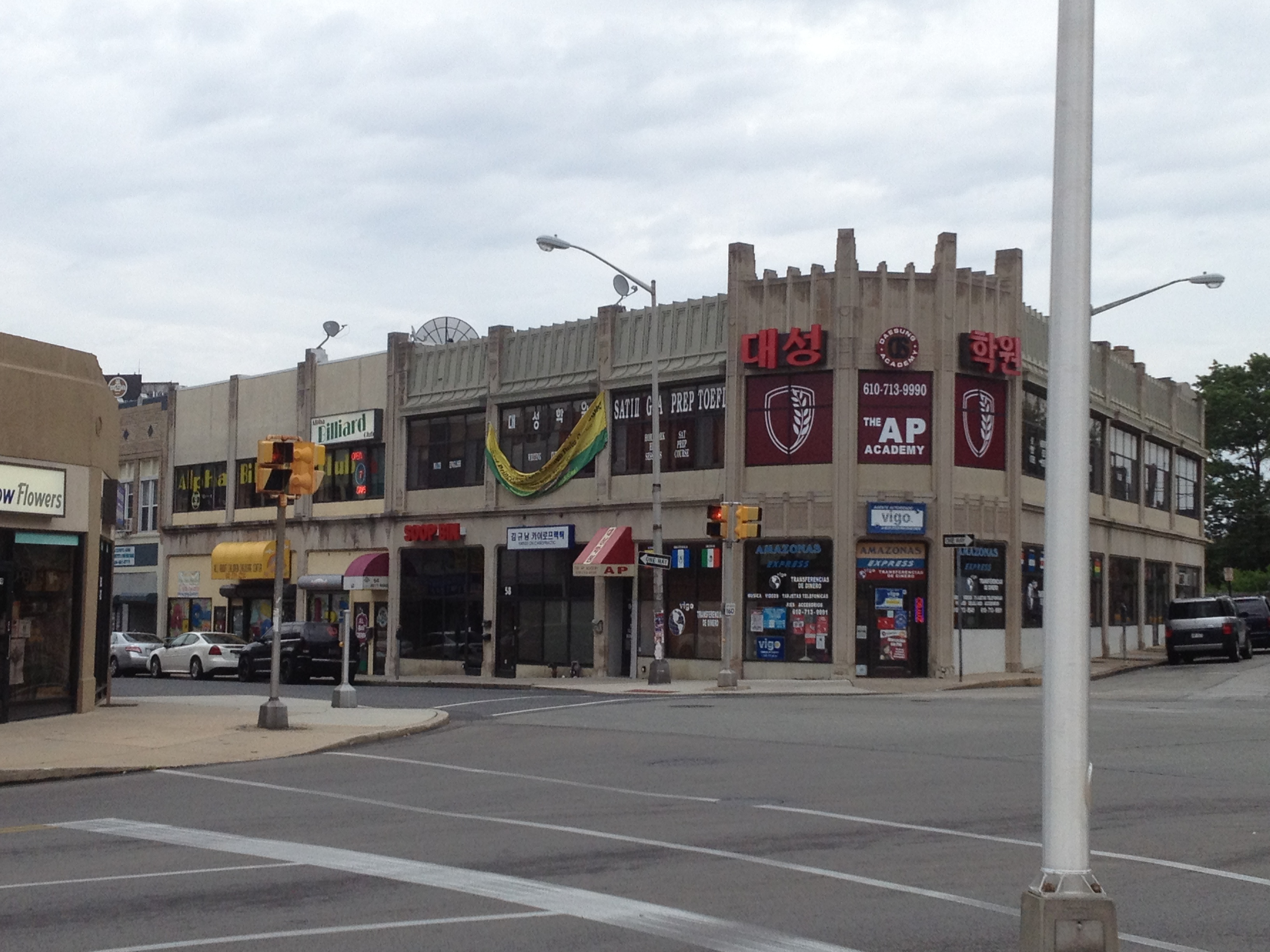
Upper Darby Township is another area where there are significant pockets of Korean people and commerce, at Fairfield Avenue and Garrett Road.

The first Philadelphia Koreatown (Korean: 필라델피아 코리아타운) is located around the Olney section of the city of Philadelphia, United States. Since the late 1980s, the Korean community has expanded northward, and it now straddles the border between North Philadelphia in Philadelphia proper and the northern suburb of Cheltenham, although many Korean-American businesses and organizations and some residents remain in Olney and adjoining neighborhoods. Upper Darby Township, bordering West Philadelphia, also has a large Korean-American population; meanwhile, a rapidly growing Korean population and commercial presence has emerged in suburban Cherry Hill, New Jersey since 2010, centered along Marlton Pike, attracted to the Cherry Hill Public Schools. Signage in Hangul is ubiquitous in some neighborhoods in these areas.

== History ==
According to The Philadelphia Inquirer, the Koreatown had "moved" from the Logan neighborhood into the Olney section in the early 1980s, attributing the migration from Logan to "too much crime" and the "schools weren't so good" at the time in Logan. In Olney, tensions were high between Koreans and the German community, as well as the black community, who did not want the section of the town to be officially declared "Koreatown", causing much violence and crime to be committed not only against Koreans, but East Asians in general. The original Koreatown existed on North 5th Street in Olney since 1984, with Korean language signs put up to help official recognition of the area; those signs were vandalized in the late 1980s but eventually resurrected. In 2024, U.S. Representative Andy Kim from Marlton, New Jersey, another South Jersey suburb of Philadelphia with a significant and growing Korean population, became the first elected uniracial Korean American U.S. Senate candidate.

== Religion ==
There is a large Korean Catholic church, Holy Angels.

== See also ==
- Koreatown
- Korean American
- Chinatown, Philadelphia
- Little Saigon, Philadelphia
- Cambodia Town, Philadelphia
- Upper Darby Township, Pennsylvania
- Millbourne, Pennsylvania
- Cheltenham Township, Pennsylvania
- Cherry Hill, New Jersey
- Koreatown, Palisades Park (벼랑 공원 코리아타운)
- Koreatown, Fort Lee (포트 리 코리아타운)
- List of U.S. cities with significant Korean-American populations

== Gallery ==
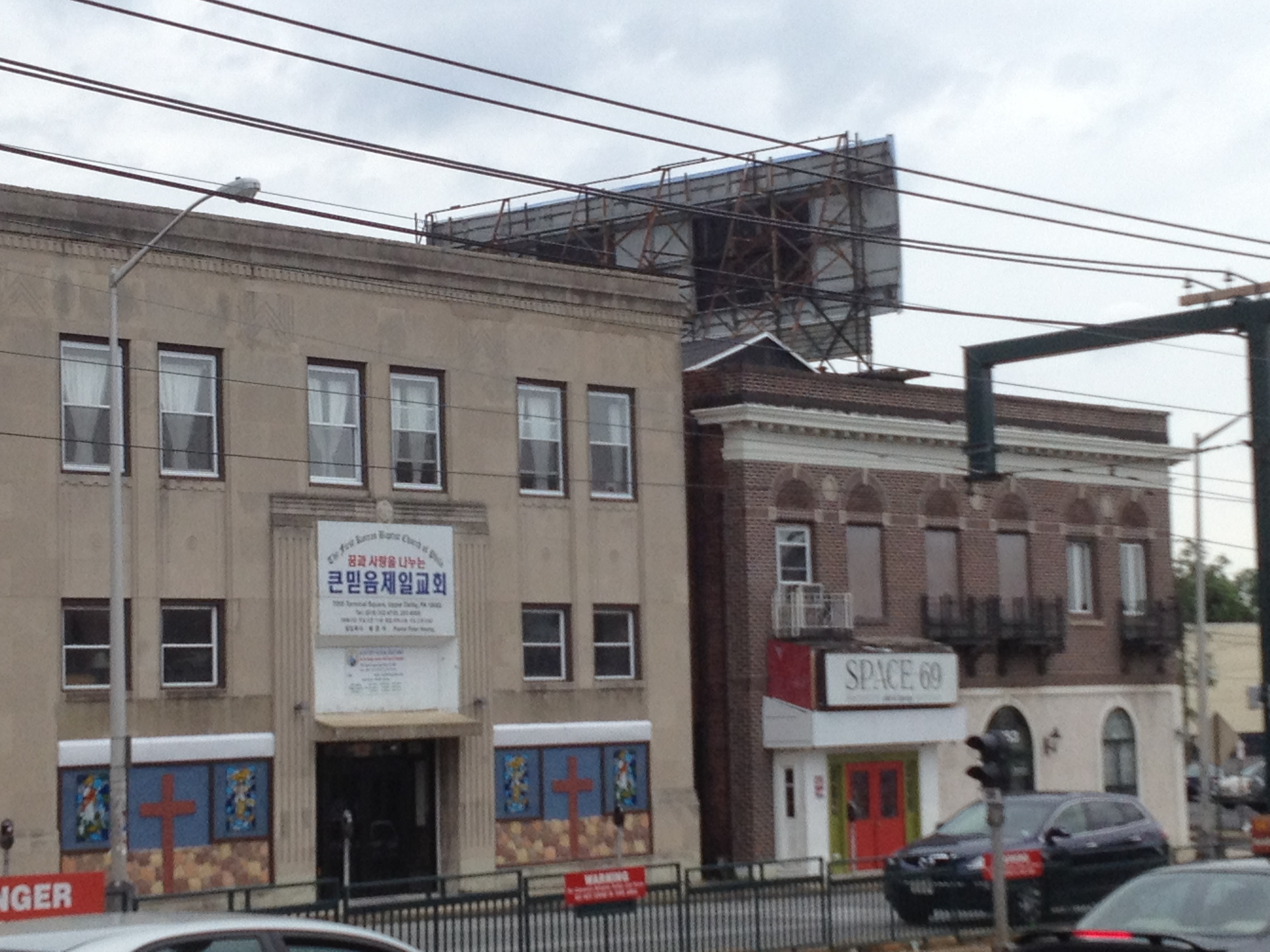
View towards Market Street PA route 3, across from H-Mart, at Terminal Square. The 69th Street Transportation Center is also nearby.

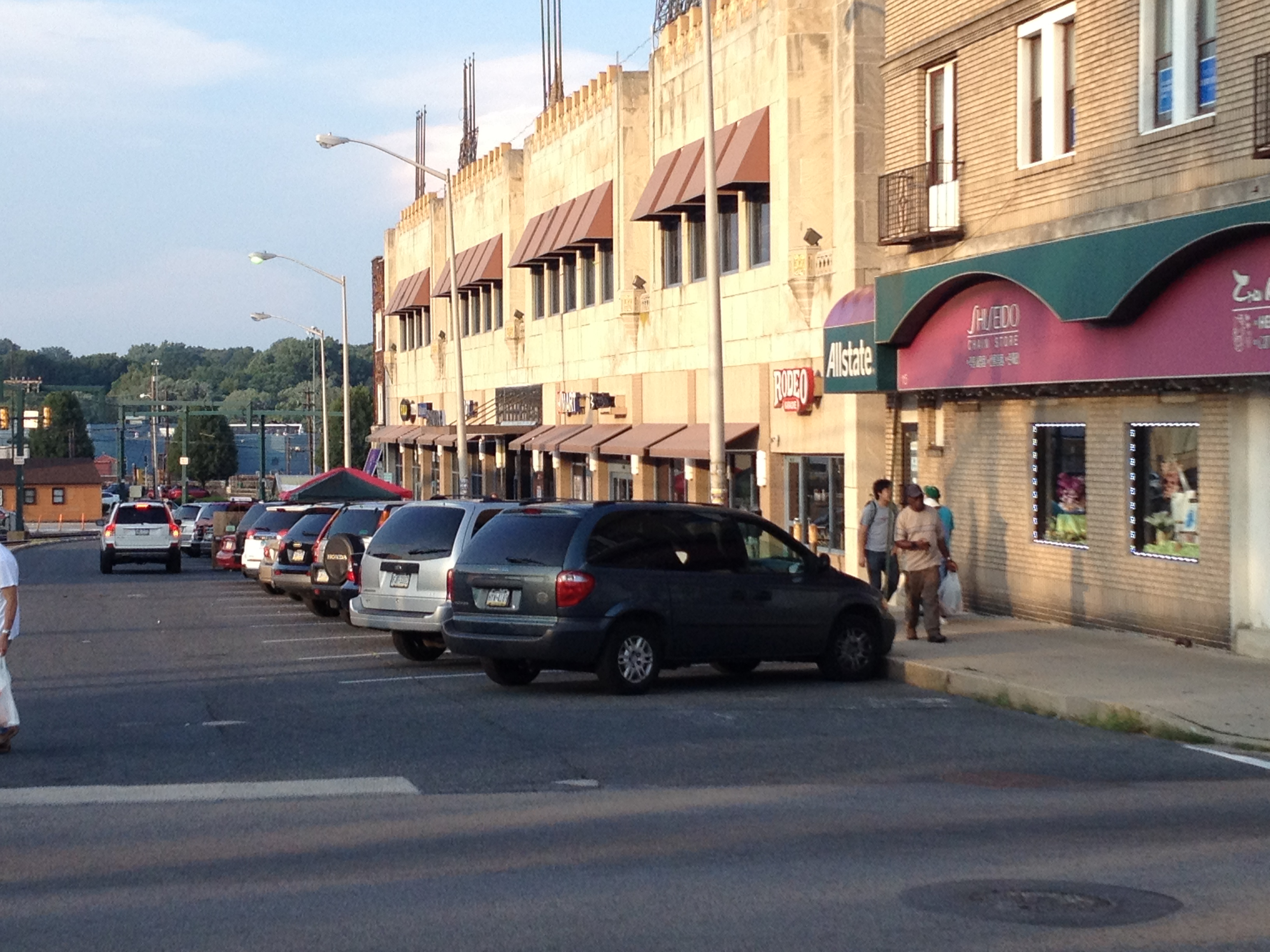
H-Mart in Upper Darby Township, Pennsylvania

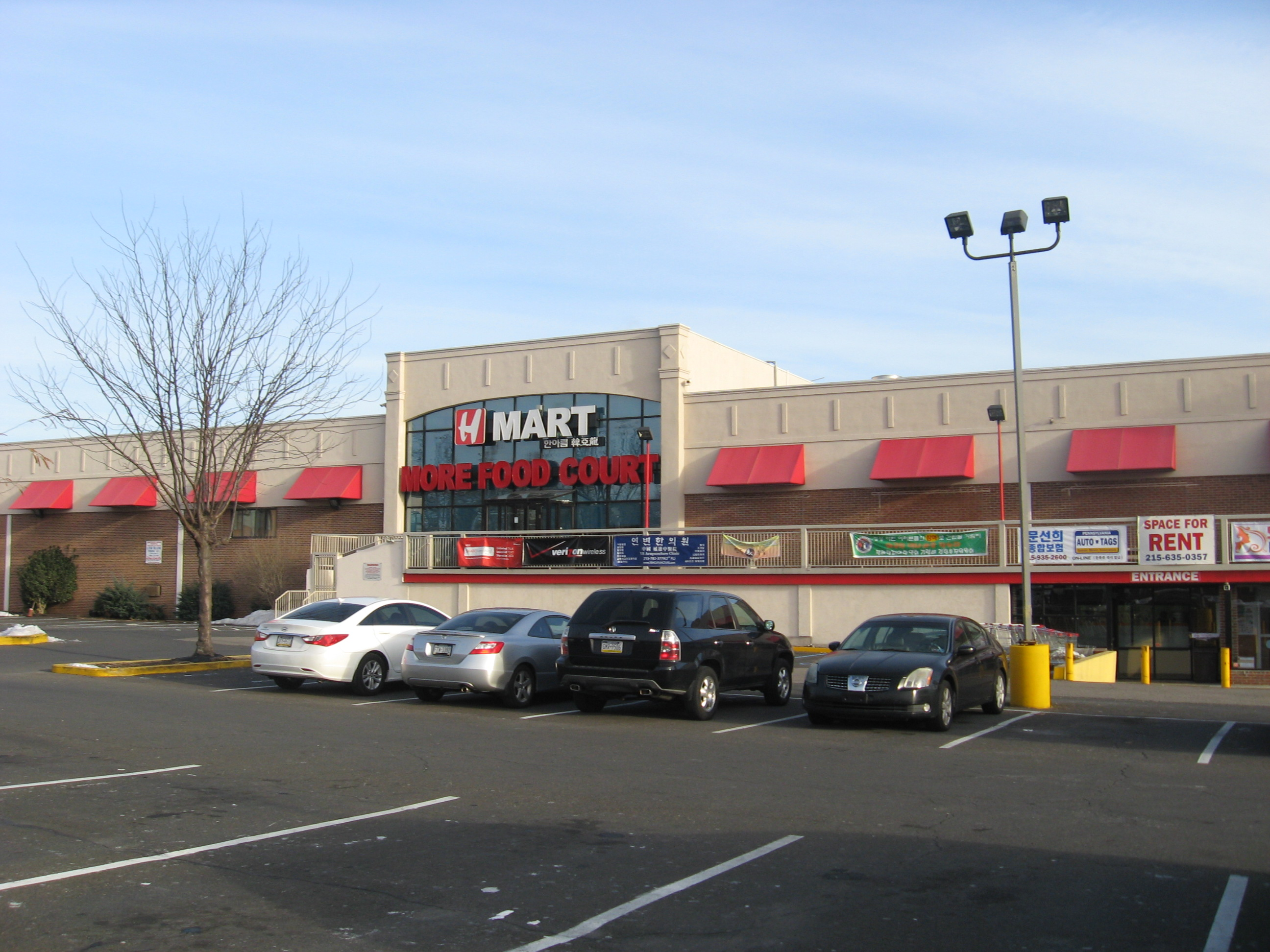
H-Mart and other Korean-American businesses in Cheltenham

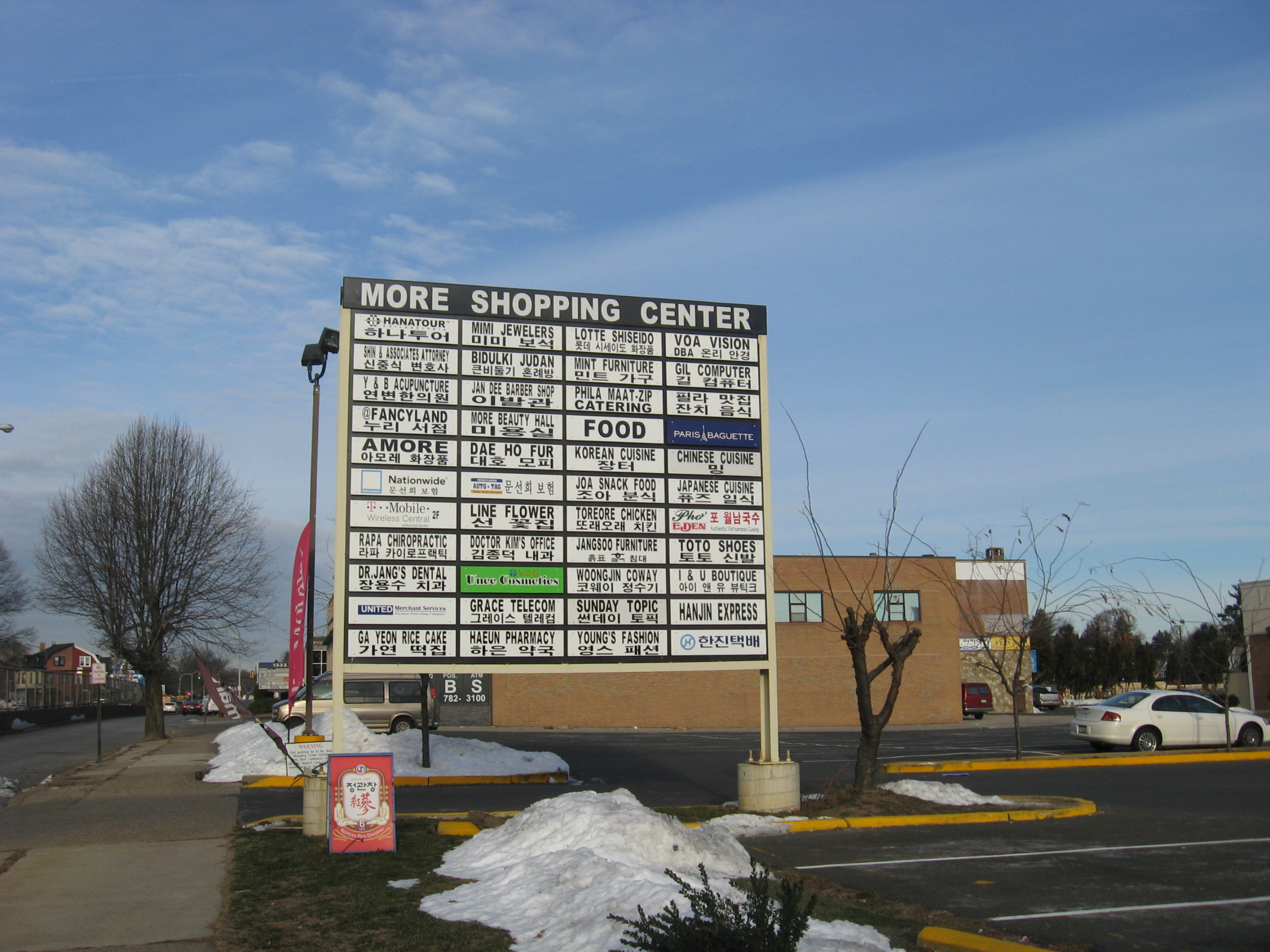
More Korean businesses in Cheltenham
