= List of U.S. cities with large Cambodian-American populations =

Cities with large Cambodian American populations, with a critical mass of at least 1% of the total urban population. Information is based on the 2020 U.S. census.

The list includes those who immigrated from Cambodia and those who are multi-generational Cambodian Americans. As of 2020, Americans of Cambodian or Khmer descent make up about 0.1% of the United States population, or 300,000 people.

== Large cities ==
The list of large cities (population greater than 250,000) with a Cambodian-American population in excess of one percent of the total population (2020).

Rank	City	State	Cambodian-Americans	Percentage
1	Long Beach	California	17,071	3.7%
2	Stockton	California	10,522	3.3%

== Medium-sized cities ==
List of medium-sized cities (population between 100,000 and 250,000) with a Cambodian-American population in excess of one percent of the total population (2020).

Rank	City	State	Cambodian-Americans	Percentage
1	Lowell	Massachusetts	15,899	13.8%
2	Lynn	Massachusetts	3,751	3.7%
3	Tacoma	Washington	3,410	1.6%
4	Providence	Rhode Island	2,634	1.4%
5	Rochester	Minnesota	1,503	1.2%
6	Modesto	California	2,484	1.1%

== See also ==
- Little Cambodia (locations in the United States)
