= SS George Sharswood =

Liberty ship of WWII

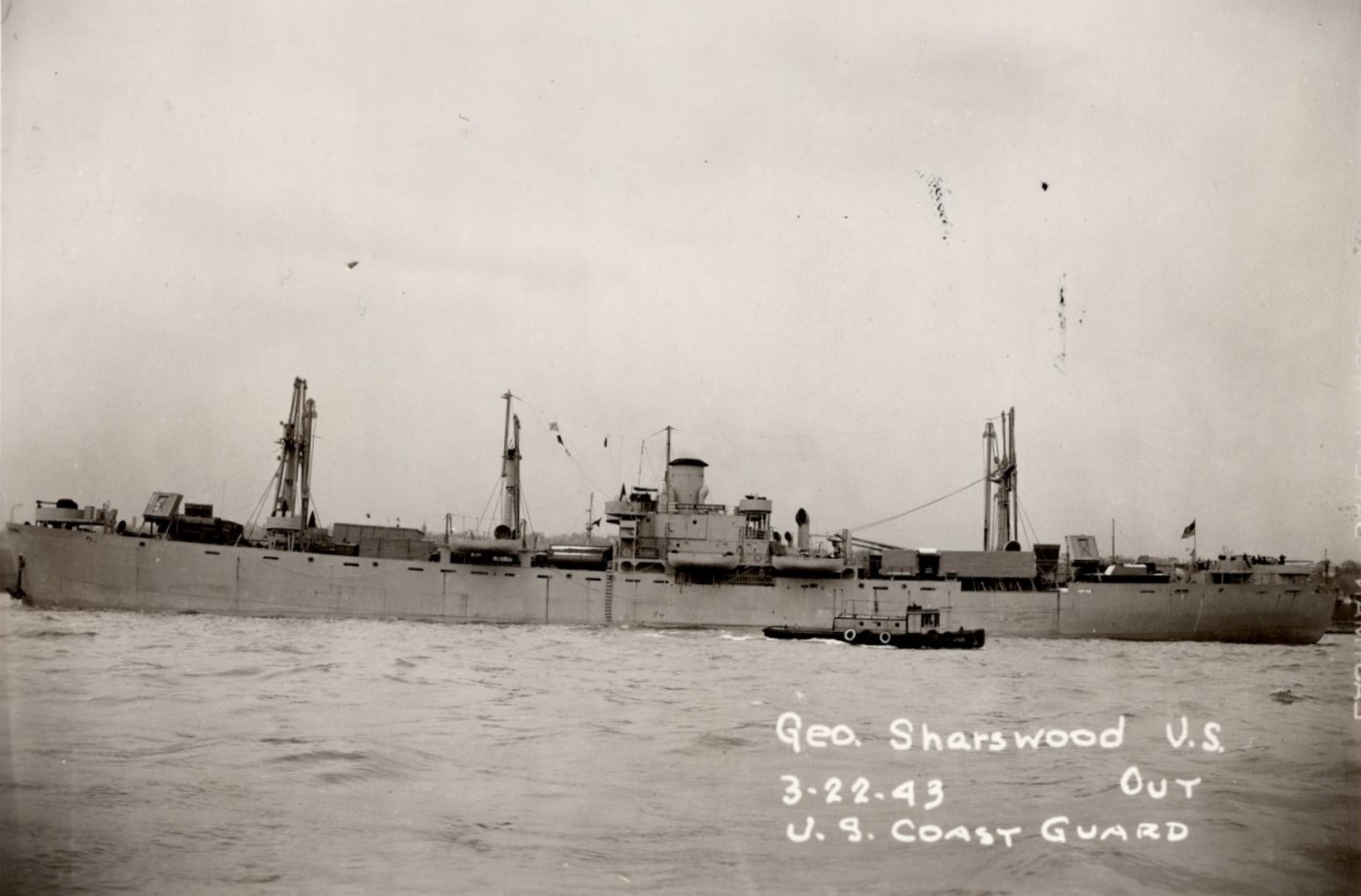
- Liberty ship SS George Sharswood, 22 March 1943

History

United States
- Name: George Sharswood
- Namesake: George Sharswood
- Owner: War Shipping Administration (WSA)
- Operator: Dichmann, Wright & Pugh, Inc.
- Ordered: as type (EC2-S-C1) hull, MCE hull 945
- Awarded: 30 January 1942
- Builder: Bethlehem-Fairfield Shipyard, Baltimore, Maryland
- Cost: $1,072,492
- Yard number: 2095
- Way number: 15
- Laid down: 11 January 1943
- Launched: 19 February 1943
- Sponsored by: Mrs. John L. Roy
- Completed: 6 March 1943
- Identification: Call sign: KKMV
- Fate: Sold, 2 July 1947

United States
- Name: New Rochelle Trails
- Owner: East Harbor Trading Corp.
- Fate: Sold, 3 August 1950

United States
- Name: North Light
- Owner: Merchants SS Corp.
- Fate: Sold, January 1954

United States
- Name: North Light
- Owner: Delphi Steamship Co.
- Fate: Sold, April 1955

United States
- Name: Willamette Trader
- Owner: Columbia Steamship Co. (1955-1956); Standard SS Corp. (1956-1958); West Coast SS Co. (1958-1961)
- Fate: Exchanged and laid up in reserve fleet, 24 October 1961, sold for scrap 1 January 1962

General characteristics
- Class & type: Liberty ship; type EC2-S-C1, standard
- Tonnage: 10,865 LT DWT; 7,176 GRT
- Displacement: 3,380 long tons (3,434 t) (light); 14,245 long tons (14,474 t) (max)
- Length: 441 feet 6 inches (135 m) oa; 416 feet (127 m) pp; 427 feet (130 m) lwl
- Beam: 57 feet (17 m)
- Draft: 27 ft 9.25 in (8.4646 m)
- Installed power: 2 × Oil fired 450 °F (232 °C) boilers, operating at 220 psi (1,500 kPa); 2,500 hp (1,900 kW)
- Propulsion: 1 × triple-expansion steam engine, (manufactured by Worthington Pump & Machinery Corp, Harrison, New Jersey); 1 × screw propeller
- Speed: 11.5 knots (21.3 km/h; 13.2 mph)
- Capacity: 562,608 cubic feet (15,931 m^{3}) (grain); 499,573 cubic feet (14,146 m^{3}) (bale)
- Complement: 38–62 USMM; 21–40 USNAG
- Armament: Varied by ship; Bow-mounted 3-inch (76 mm)/50-caliber gun; Stern-mounted 4-inch (102 mm)/50-caliber gun; 2–8 × single 20-millimeter (0.79 in) Oerlikon anti-aircraft (AA) cannons and/or, 2–8 × 37-millimeter (1.46 in) M1 AA guns

SS George Sharswood was a Liberty ship built in the United States during World War II. She was named after George Sharswood, was an American politician and judge. He served as a Whig member of the Pennsylvania House of Representatives from 1837 to 1838 and 1842 to 1843. He served on the select council for Philadelphia from 1839 to 1840, as a district judge in Pennsylvania from 1845 to 1867, as a justice on the Supreme Court of Pennsylvania from 1868 to 1879 and as chief justice from 1879 to 1882. He was a professor of law at the University of Pennsylvania Law School and served as Dean from 1852 to 1868.

== Construction ==
George Sharswood was laid down on 11 January 1943, under a Maritime Commission (MARCOM) contract, MCE hull 945, by the Bethlehem-Fairfield Shipyard, Baltimore, Maryland; she was sponsored by Mrs. John L. Roy, and launched on 19 February 1943.

== History ==
She was allocated to the Dichmann, Wright & Pugh, Inc., on 6 March 1943.

On 26 May 1947, she was sold to East Harbor Trading Corp., and renamed New Rochelle Trails. On 3 August 1950, she was sold to Merchants SS Corp., for $18,084, and renamed North Light. In January 1954, she was sold to Delphi Steamship Co., and renamed Willamette Trader. She was again sold in 1955 and 1959, before being exchanged and placed into the Defense Reserve Fleet, in Astoria, Oregon, on 24 October 1961. She was sold to Zidell Explorations, Inc., on 11 January 1962, for scrapping.

== Bibliography ==
- "Bethlehem-Fairfield, Baltimore MD". www.ShipbuildingHistory.com. 7 August 2021.
- Maritime Administration. "George Sharswood". Ship History Database Vessel Status Card. U.S. Department of Transportation, Maritime Administration.
- Davies, James (May 2004). "Specifications (As-Built)" (PDF). p. 23.
- "SS George Sharswood".
- Williams, Greg H. (2014). The Liberty Ships of World War II. Jefferson, North Carolina: McFarland & Company, Inc. ISBN 9780786479450.
- Sawyer, L.A.; Mitchell, W.H. (1985). The Liberty Ships. Bury St. Edmunds, Suffolk, Great Britain: St. Edmundsbury Press Ltd. ISBN 1850440492.
