= Daniel Agnew =

American judge

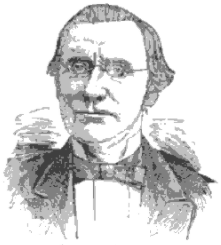

Chief Justice of the Supreme Court of Pennsylvania
- In office 1873–1879
- Succeeded by: George Sharswood

Personal details
- Born: January 5, 1809 Trenton, New Jersey, US
- Died: March 9, 1902 (aged 93) Beaver, Pennsylvania, US
- Resting place: Cemetery and Mausoleum, Beaver, Pennsylvania
- Spouse: Elizabeth (Moore) Agnew (1810–1888)
- Children: 6
- Education: University of Pittsburgh; Washington & Jefferson College; Dickinson College

Daniel Agnew (January 5, 1809 – March 9, 1902) was the Chief Justice of the Supreme Court of Pennsylvania from 1873 to 1879.

== Early years ==
Agnew was born at Trenton, New Jersey on January 5, 1809. His Irish/Welsh heritage family moved to Pittsburgh, Pennsylvania, when Agnew was about four years old. Agnew grew up there, attended the University of Pittsburgh (then known as the Western University of Pennsylvania), and then studied law with two experienced attorneys. He was admitted to the bar in 1829, at age twenty and began practicing law.

== Career ==
He soon relocated his legal practice about 35 miles north, to the town of Beaver, Pennsylvania, the county seat of Beaver County. He became an expert on land titles, an important topic in western Pennsylvania at that time. In his retirement, he used this expertise to write a book on the subject, published in 1887 and entitled: A History of the Region of Pennsylvania North of the Ohio and West of the Allegheny River, of the Indian Purchases, and the Running of the Southern, Northern and Western Boundaries.

In 1836, he was chosen as a delegate to the Constitutional Convention of Pennsylvania. In 1851, he was appointed to fill a vacancy as President Judge of a four-county district. Within a few months, he was elected to a full ten-year term for that position; in 1861, he was elected to a second ten-year term.

In 1863, he attracted statewide attention for a speech that he gave with the title Our National Constitution: Its Adaptation to a State of War or Insurrection. Subsequently, he was nominated in 1864 to run for a seat as Associate Justice of the Supreme Court of Pennsylvania. Running on a Republican ticket that also included the popular Republican governor Andrew Curtin, Agnew defeated the incumbent, then-Chief Justice Walter H. Lowrie. In 1873, he became the Chief Justice. His service on the Court included writing the opinion in the case of Commonwealth v. Drum, which is often cited as the foundation authority on the legal definition of murder in Pennsylvania.

He received honorary Legum Doctor degrees from Washington College in 1864, and Dickinson College in 1880, both in Pennsylvania. Agnew was in the Whig Party until the Republican Party was being organized in the late 1850s. He assisted in that party's organization and was thereafter known as a Republican. He attended the Methodist Episcopal church.

== Last years ==
At the conclusion of his term in 1879, Agnew retired to his home in Beaver and from that point handled only a very few select legal matters. He occupied his time by writing a number of pamphlets devoted to the history of the Beaver area. In 1880 he was chosen as the first president of the constitutional temperance amendment association of New Jersey. His health began to decline around 1899 and he died on March 9, 1902.

== Family ==
Agnew's father was a Princeton-educated doctor and his mother was part of the Howell family that was prominent in New Jersey affairs of that era.

In 1831, Agnew married Elizabeth Moore, daughter of Robert Moore, a prominent citizen and politician in Beaver. They had six children.

Legal offices
Preceded by John M. Read	Chief Justice of the Supreme Court of Pennsylvania; 1873–1879	Succeeded by George Sharswood
