= George Sharswood School =

- U.S. National Register of Historic Places
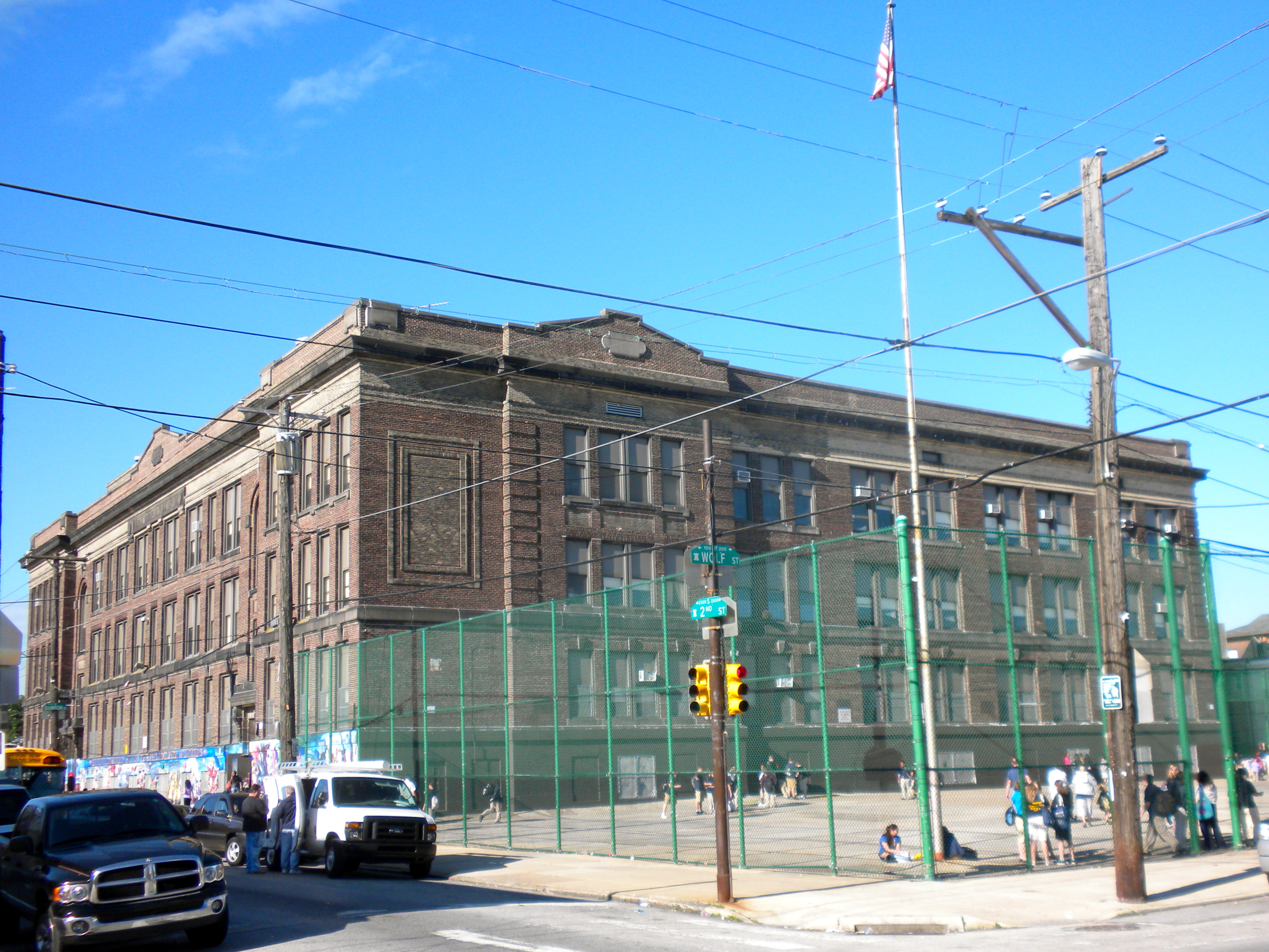
- George Sharswood School, May 2010

- Location within Philadelphia Location within Pennsylvania Location within the United States
- Location: 2300 S. 2nd St., Philadelphia, Pennsylvania
- Coordinates: 39°55′07″N 75°09′03″W
- Area: 2 acres (0.81 ha)
- Built: 1906–1908
- Built by: Charles McCaul Co.
- Architect: Henry deCourcy Richards
- Architectural style: Colonial Revival
- MPS: Philadelphia Public Schools TR
- NRHP reference No.: 88002320
- Added to NRHP: November 18, 1988

George W. Sharswood School is a K-8 school located in the Whitman neighborhood of Philadelphia, Pennsylvania. It is a part of the School District of Philadelphia.

== History ==
The school building was designed by Henry deCourcy Richards and built in 1906–1908. It is a three-story, seven-bay, brick building in the Colonial Revival-style. It features projecting end bays with entrances, a large stone cornice, and brick and stone parapet. George Sharswood was a member of the Pennsylvania House of Representatives, a Philadelphia city council member and a judge. The building was added to the National Register of Historic Places in 1988.

In 2008 Jack Stollsteimer, a former U.S. attorney, and an area school safety advocate, criticized the school after the principal failed to report an assault of a student in a timely manner. As a result, the school district demanded more thorough reporting from its schools, and the rate of reported incidents sharply increased.

== Feeder patterns ==
Neighborhoods assigned to Sharswood are also assigned to Furness High School.
