= YPC Shari-Eli =

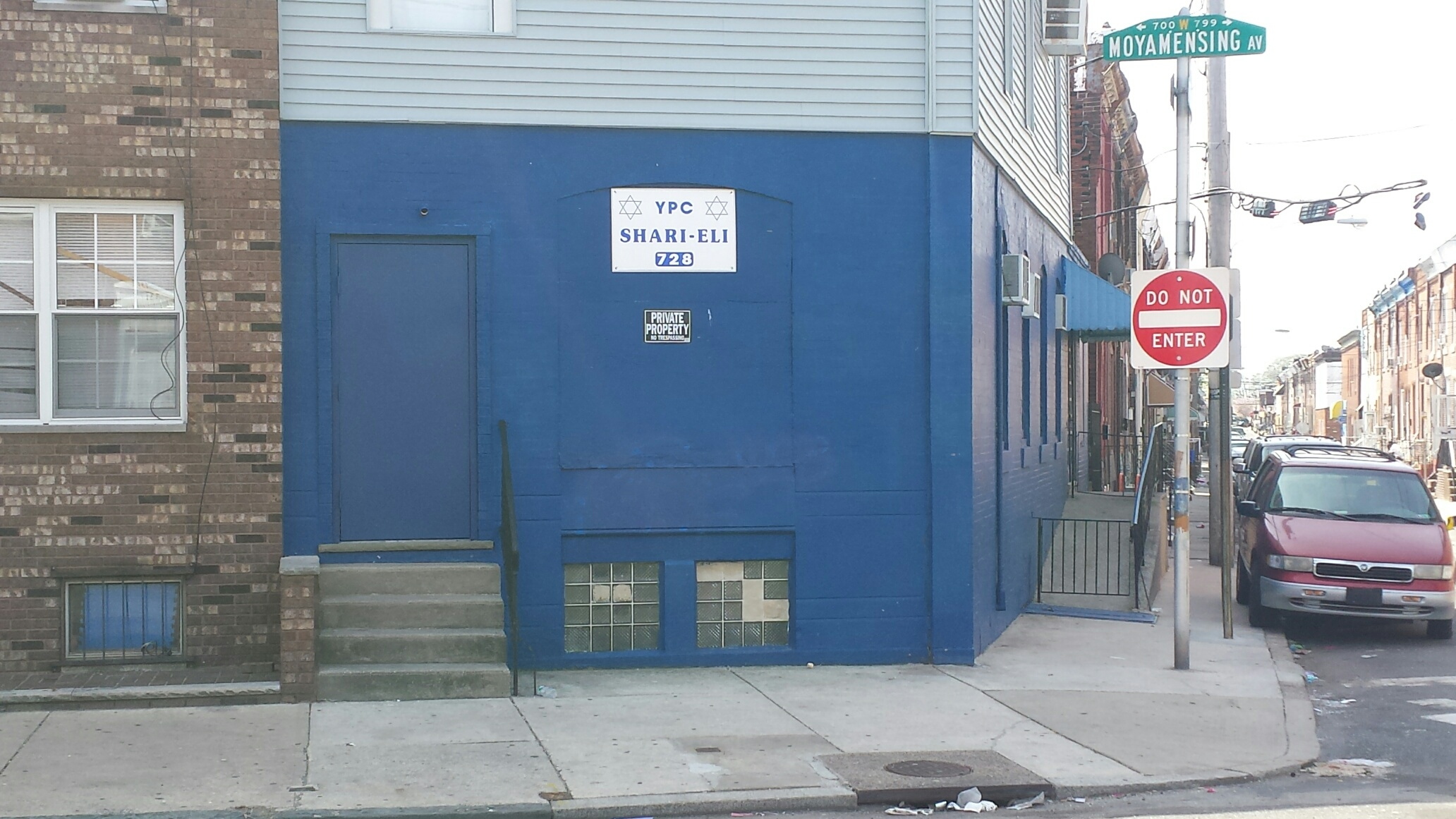
- YPC Shari-Eli synagogue, in 2015

- Location in Philadelphia

Religion
- Affiliation: Conservative Judaism
- Ecclesiastical or organizational status: Synagogue
- Leadership: Rabbi Dr. Gail Glicksman
- Status: Active

Location
- Location: 728 West Moyamensing Avenue, Whitman, Philadelphia, Pennsylvania 19148
- Country: United States
- Interactive map of YPC Shari-Eli
- Coordinates: 39°55′13″N 75°09′35″W

Architecture
- Established: 1948 (as a congregation)

Website
- hypcsharieli.mailchimpsites.com

YPC Shari-Eli is an unaffiliated Conservative synagogue located in the Whitman neighborhood of South Philadelphia, Pennsylvania, in the United States. Congregational services are lay-led. YPC Shari Eli was founded in 1948. It is South Philadelphia's last active Conservative synagogue and only synagogue located south of Snyder Avenue.

== History ==
Young People's Congregation (YPC) Shari-Eli was founded in 1948 when a group of younger members of Shaari Eliohu (8th and Porter Streets), under the leadership of Kelman Israel, broke away, formed a Conservative congregation, and moved into the building of the former Shaare Torah synagogue at Franklin Street and Moyamensing Avenue. YPC Shari-Eli established a building fund in 1953 with a goal to raise $25,000. Shari Eli remodeled its building in 1961. The congregation replaced the removable ceiling opening to the second-floor women's section balcony with a permanent ceiling.

Harry Bietchman was hired as rabbi in 1954 and served the congregation for 18 years. Israel Wolmark was appointed rabbi in 1972 and served for approximately thirty years.

Struggling to attract a minyan for Shabbat services in December 1971, Shari Eli joined Shar Israel, 4th and Porter Streets, on Friday evenings for services, and then welcomed Shar Israel to its building on Saturday afternoons for the third meal and evening services.

== See also ==
- History of the Jewish Quarter of Philadelphia
