= Deportation of Cambodian immigrants from the United States =

Deportation of Cambodians from the United States typically refers to the forced repatriation of Cambodians who are convicted of crimes in the United States and are not American citizens.

== History ==
In 1977, the US Congress arranged for Cambodians fleeing the Khmer Rouge to become permanent residents of the country through the Indochina Migration and Refugee Assistance Act, eventually making them eligible for citizenship. Most were placed in neighborhoods in Lowell and Lynn, Massachusetts, and in Long Beach, California, often with little continuing support from the federal government.

In 1996, the Clinton administration signed into law immigration reforms intended to crack down on illegal immigration and terrorism under the Illegal Immigration Reform and Immigrant Responsibility Act of 1996. Deportation of Cambodians was legally permitted under that act but could not be effected without agreement between the American and Cambodian governments. In March 2002, the two governments signed a treaty regulating deportation between the two countries. Cambodians who had not applied for American citizenship were then liable to deportation upon final conviction of a crime in the United States, regardless of legal residency or marriage to American citizens.

Some 600 Cambodian-Americans have been deported since 2002. Federal data show that deportations averaged 41 per year from 2001 through 2010, increasing to 97 in 2011 and 93 in 2013. As of 2014, nearly 1900 had final orders of removal, while 669 were in deportation proceedings. Deportees are typically young men in their twenties and thirties who were born in Cambodia or the Thai refugee camps and arrived in the United States as small children, members of the so-called 1.5 generation. A survey by one immigrant advocacy organization showed that deportees had spent an average of 20 years in the United States.

As such, they received most or all of their education in the US, often speak Khmer poorly, and lack socialization to Cambodian culture. Some left wives and children in the United States, while others have married or fathered children in Cambodia.

During the second Trump administration, Cambodian illegal immigrants were among those that passed while in ICE custody.

== Cambodian reaction ==
The incidence of deportation has been projected to increase significantly; as of 2005, out of 1200 to 1500 potential deportees, 127 had been returned to Cambodia, up from 40 three years previously. Bill Herod, a long-time resident of Cambodia, established the Returnee Assistance Program, a non-governmental organization, to assist deportees in transitioning to life in Cambodia. However, deportees receive no official support, and Cambodian government officials have expressed their consternation that the United States is dumping "American gang members" on the streets of Cambodia.

The integration of these deportees has been mixed. Some have completely integrated into Cambodian society, but most tend to live near each other and socialize with one another. Currently, several deportees set up and work for a local harm reeducation organization, Korsang, providing help for drug addicts.

Korsang has received a lot of attention from the local media as well as international support from leading organizations for its ground-breaking work. They hire Cambodian deportees who go through the neighborhoods and streets in order to talk to drug users. They give out condoms and tell drug addicts about the danger of spreading HIV through sharing needles for heroin use and offer them help in cutting down or quitting their addiction.

== See also ==
- Cambodian Americans
