= Whitman, Philadelphia =

Neighborhood of Philadelphia, Pennsylvania

Whitman
- Neighborhood of Philadelphia
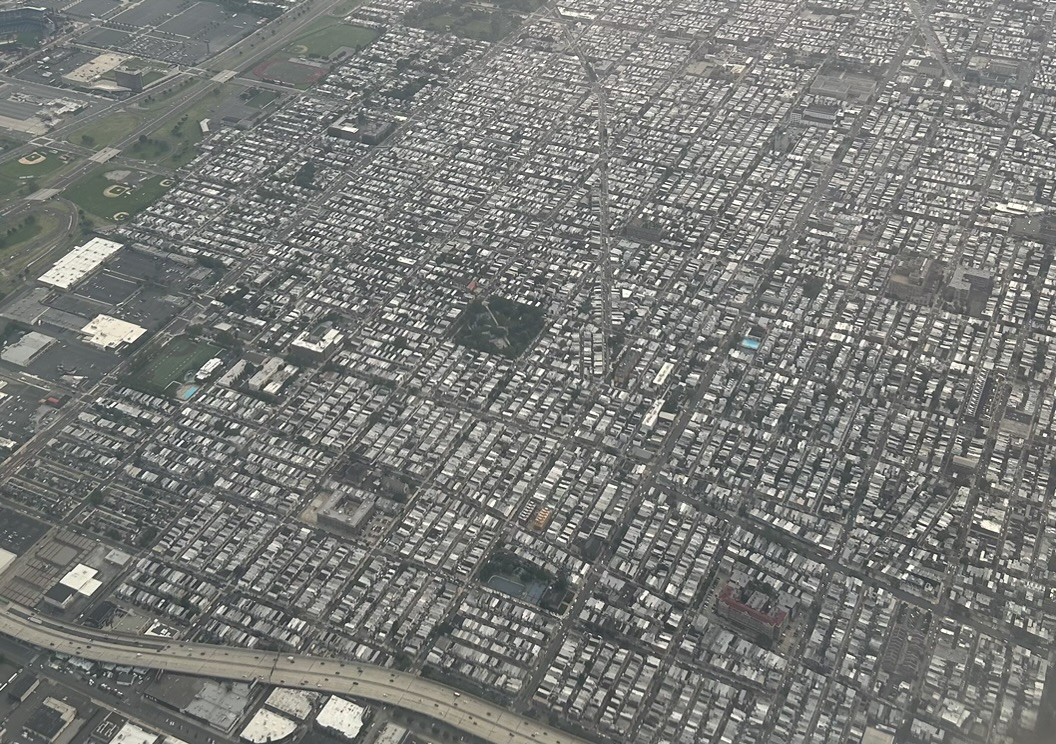
- Whitman, in the foreground, as seen from the air, with Mifflin Square Park and George Sharswood School visible in center. North is to the right of the image.

- Location within Philadelphia
- Country: United States
- State: Pennsylvania
- County: Philadelphia
- City: Philadelphia
- Zip code: 19148
- Area codes: 215, 267 and 445

Whitman is a neighborhood in the South Philadelphia section of Philadelphia, Pennsylvania, United States. It is bounded on the west by Sixth Street, on the east by Interstate 95, on the south by Bigler Street, and on the north by Snyder Avenue. The name "Whitman" was adopted when the nearby Walt Whitman Bridge, named after poet Walt Whitman, was being constructed in the 1950s.

== Demographics ==
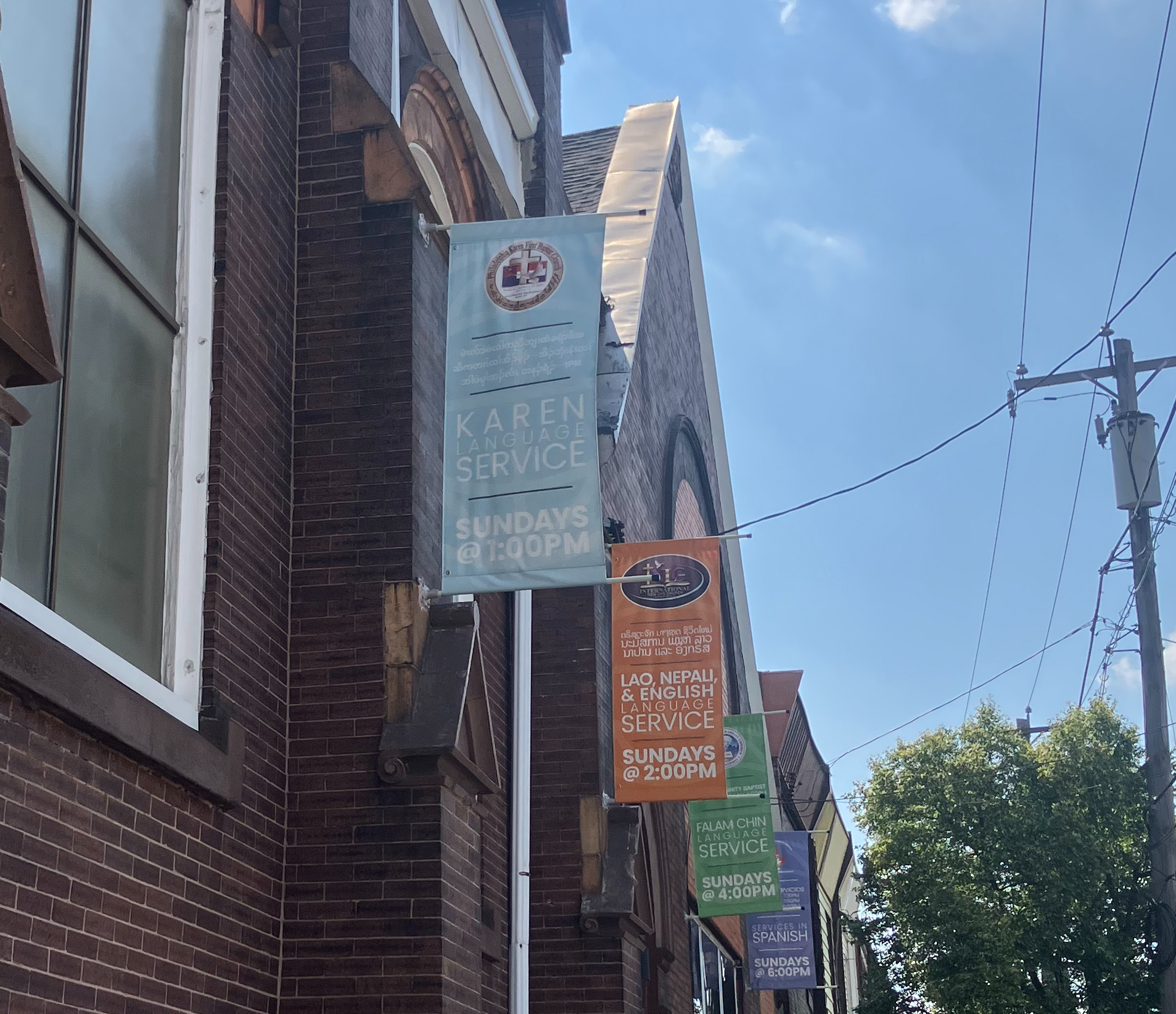
A church in Whitman at 3rd St & Snyder Avenue offering services in a variety of languages.

According to the 2020 Census, Whitman had 10,320 residents, up from 9,598 in 2010 (an increase of 7.5%). The racial makeup of the community is 63% white, 6% Black, 23% Asian, 7% mixed race. The population of the neighborhood is 12% Hispanic or Latino. According to a local nonprofit organization, the neighborhood is home to families from 77 countries who collectively speak 55 distinct languages at home. A large portion of the estimated 12,000 Cambodian Americans residing in Philadelphia live in Whitman and the adjacent Lower Moyamensing neighborhood.

A well-established commercial corridor on South 7th Street caters to the large population of Southeast Asian Americans with grocery stores, restaurants and immigrant services.

== Major landmarks ==
- Whitman Plaza shopping center, Fourth Street and Oregon Avenue.
- YPC Shari-Eli synagogue, 728 W Moyamensing Avenue
- Preah Buddha Rangsey Temple on the southeast corner of Mifflin Square

The George Sharswood School and SS United States are listed on the National Register of Historic Places.

== Playgrounds ==
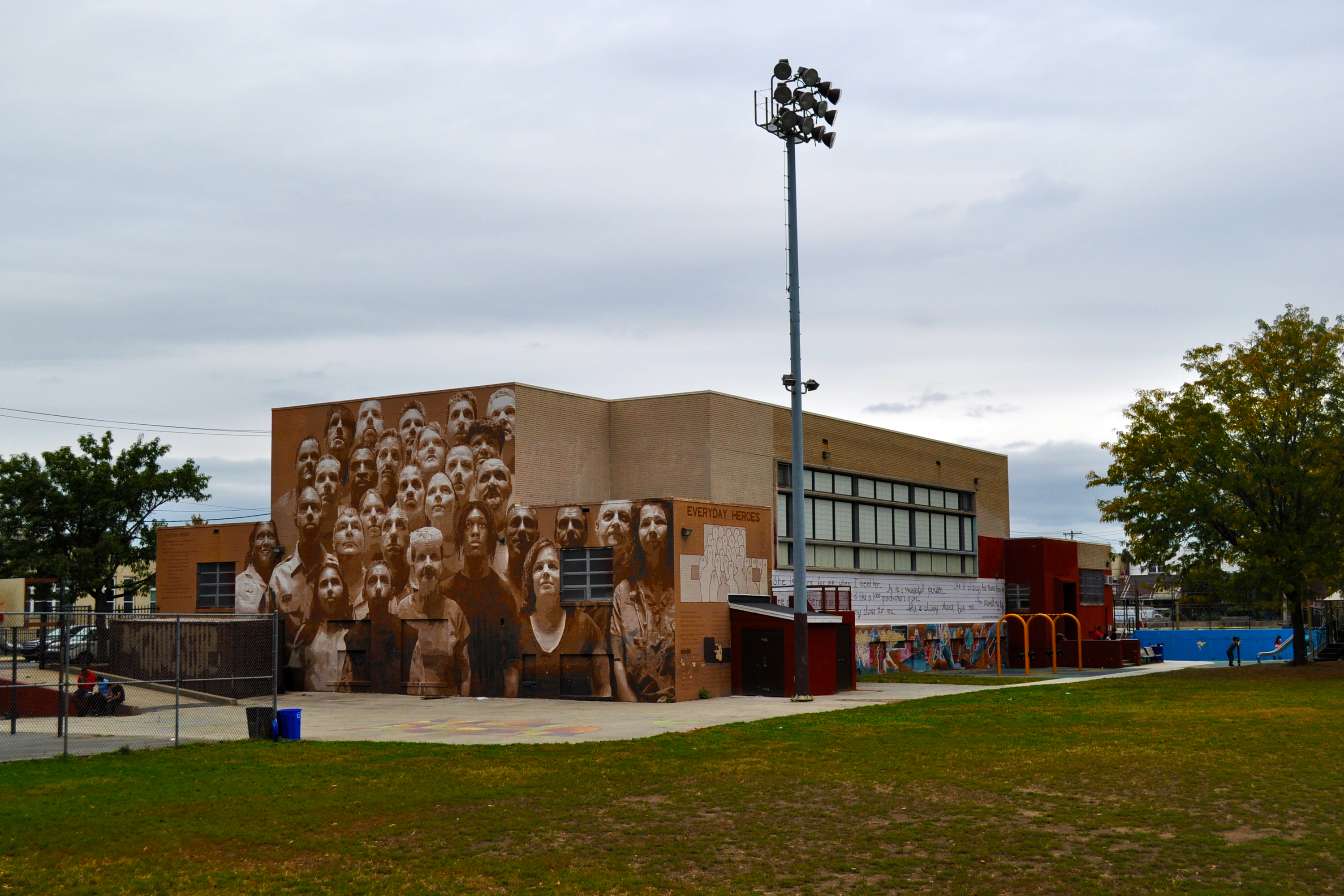
Lawrence E Murphy Recreation Center

Lawrence E. Murphy Recreation Center, 300 W. Shunk St. This 4.9-acre park has playground equipment, a pool, a basketball court, and sports fields. The five-room building has a gymnasium and multi-purpose rooms. The site was renamed in honor of Lawrence E. Murphy in 1964. He was an employee of the recreation department for 37 years. He worked at this site when it was known as "Greenwich Recreation Center."

Mifflin Square, 500 Wolf St. This 4.2-acre park in South Philadelphia has large trees, walkways, playground equipment and a basketball court.

Reverend Edward P. Burke Playground, 200 Snyder Ave. A 1.7-acre site with playground equipment, a basketball court and hockey court. Located adjacent to the Whitman branch of the Free Library. The site was named in honor of Reverend Edward P. Burke in 1963. Burke was pastor at Our Lady of Mount Carmel church from 1950 until his death in 1960. He was a vocal opponent of housing and expressway construction projects that threatened to destroy homes in the area. He was ordained in 1922 and served as a U.S. Army chaplain in WWII, retiring with the rank of major.

== Education ==
=== Schools ===
The School District of Philadelphia operates public schools in the Whitman neighborhood.

- George Sharswood Elementary, 2300 S. Second St.
- John H. Taggart Elementary, 400 Porter St.

Neighborhoods assigned to Sharswood are also assigned to Furness High School.

=== Public libraries ===
The Free Library of Philadelphia Whitman Branch serves the community.

== Notable people ==
- Joey Coyle, who stole $1.2 million that fell from an armored truck in 1981. His story was developed into a 1993 movie, Money for Nothing, starring John Cusack
- Jim Kenney, the 99th mayor of Philadelphia, grew up in the Whitman neighborhood and once served as a board member of Whitman Council Civic Association
- Mark Squilla, city councilman

== District and local organization ==
=== State Senate district ===
- First, Nikil Saval (D)

=== State House district ===
- 184th, Elizabeth Fiedler (D)

=== City Council district ===
- First, Mark Squilla (D)

=== Ward ===
- 39th

=== Police district ===
- Third

=== Civic groups and town watches ===
- Whitman Plaza Community
- Pennsport/Whitman Town Watch
- Mifflin Square Patrol
- Whitman Council, which holds monthly meetings and distributes bimonthly newsletters
