= Wat Khmer Palelai Monastery =

Theravada Buddhist temple in Pennsylvania, United States

- វត្តខ្មែរបាលិលេយ្យ
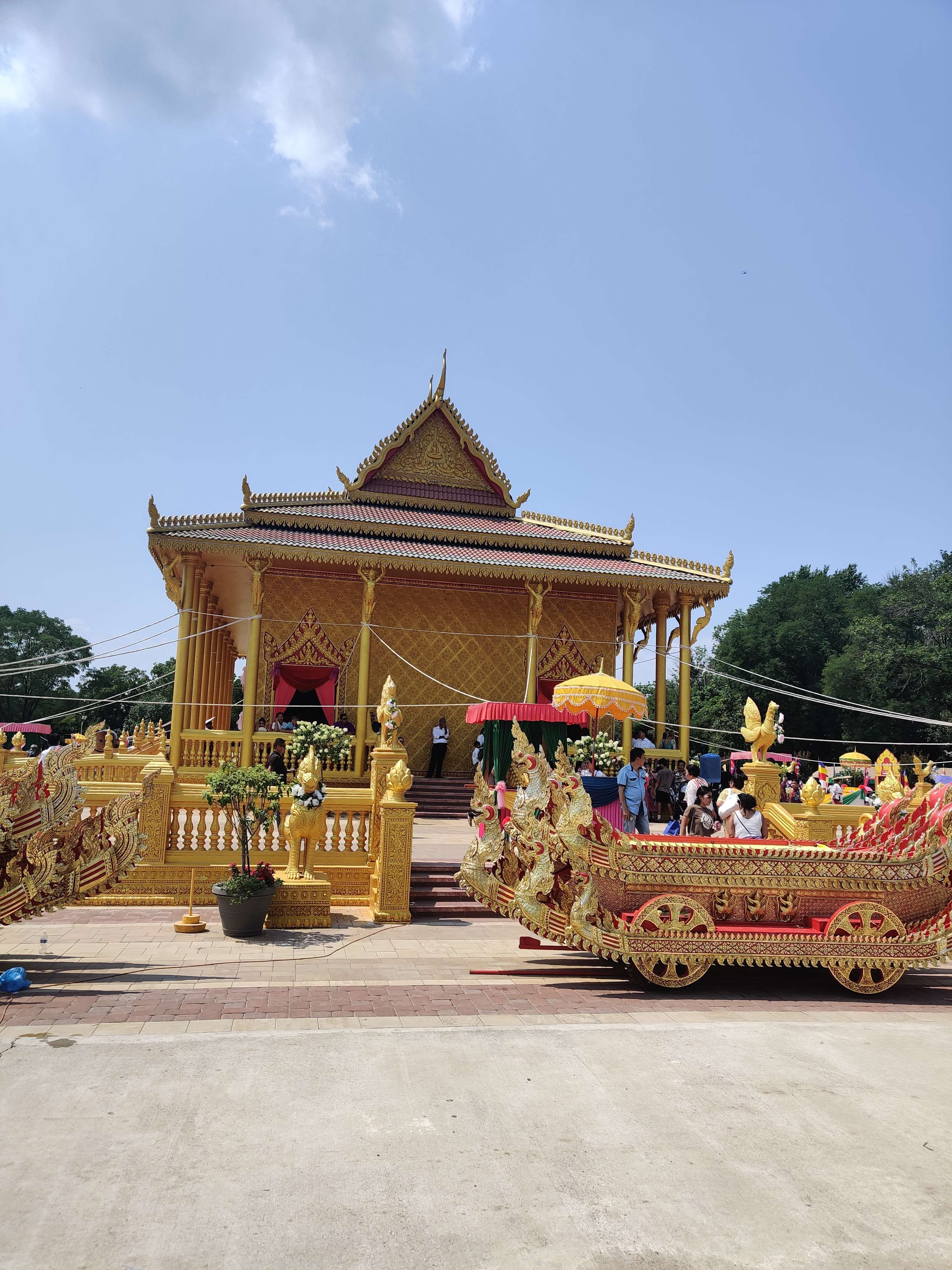

- Location in Philadelphia Wat Khmer Palelai Monastery (Pennsylvania) Wat Khmer Palelai Monastery (the United States)

Religion
- Affiliation: Theravada Buddhism
- Status: Operational

Location
- Location: 2701 S 58th St, Philadelphia, PA 19143
- Country: United States
- Interactive map of Wat Khmer Palelai Monastery
- Coordinates: 39°55′38″N 75°13′00″W

Architecture
- Completed: 1986 (First location), 2010 (Second location), July 14, 2024 (Pagoda construction finished at second location)

Wat Khmer Palelai Monastery is a Cambodian Theravada Buddhist temple located in Philadelphia, Pennsylvania. The monastery was founded in 1986 in a South Philadelphia row house. In 2010, the community acquired a 238,000-square-foot plot of land, where the current temple stands. The temple complex took nearly a decade to complete as the project was funded over time through donations from the local community.

== Gallery ==
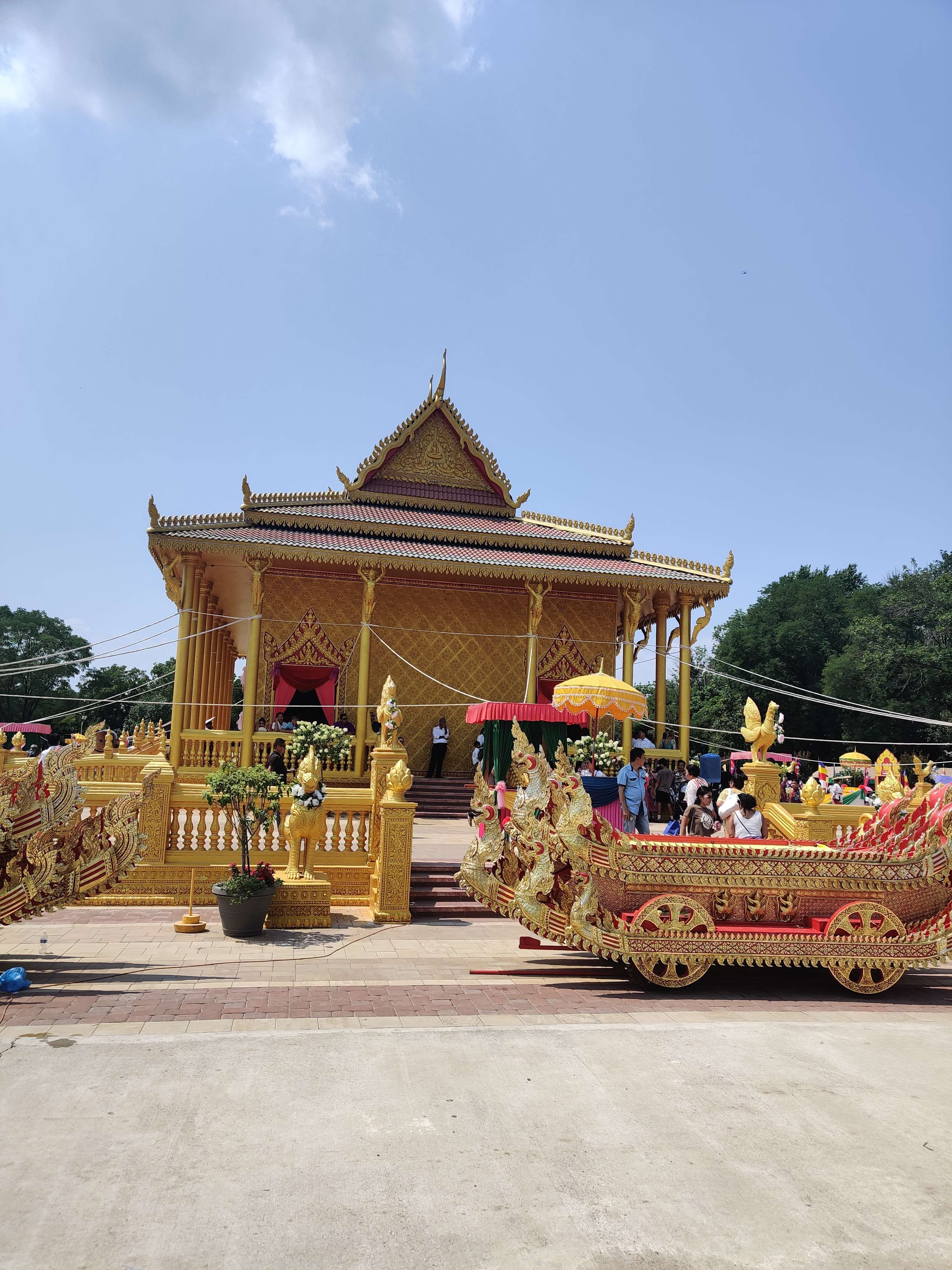
Wat Khmer Palelai Philadelphia during its official opening ceremony of the Pagoda on July 14, 2024

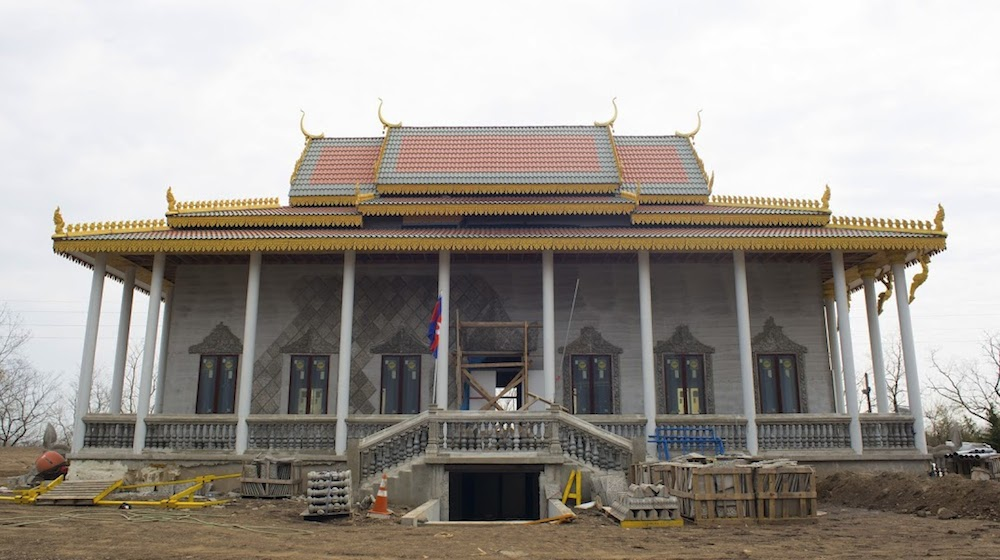
Wat Khmer Palelai Philadelphia Under Construction

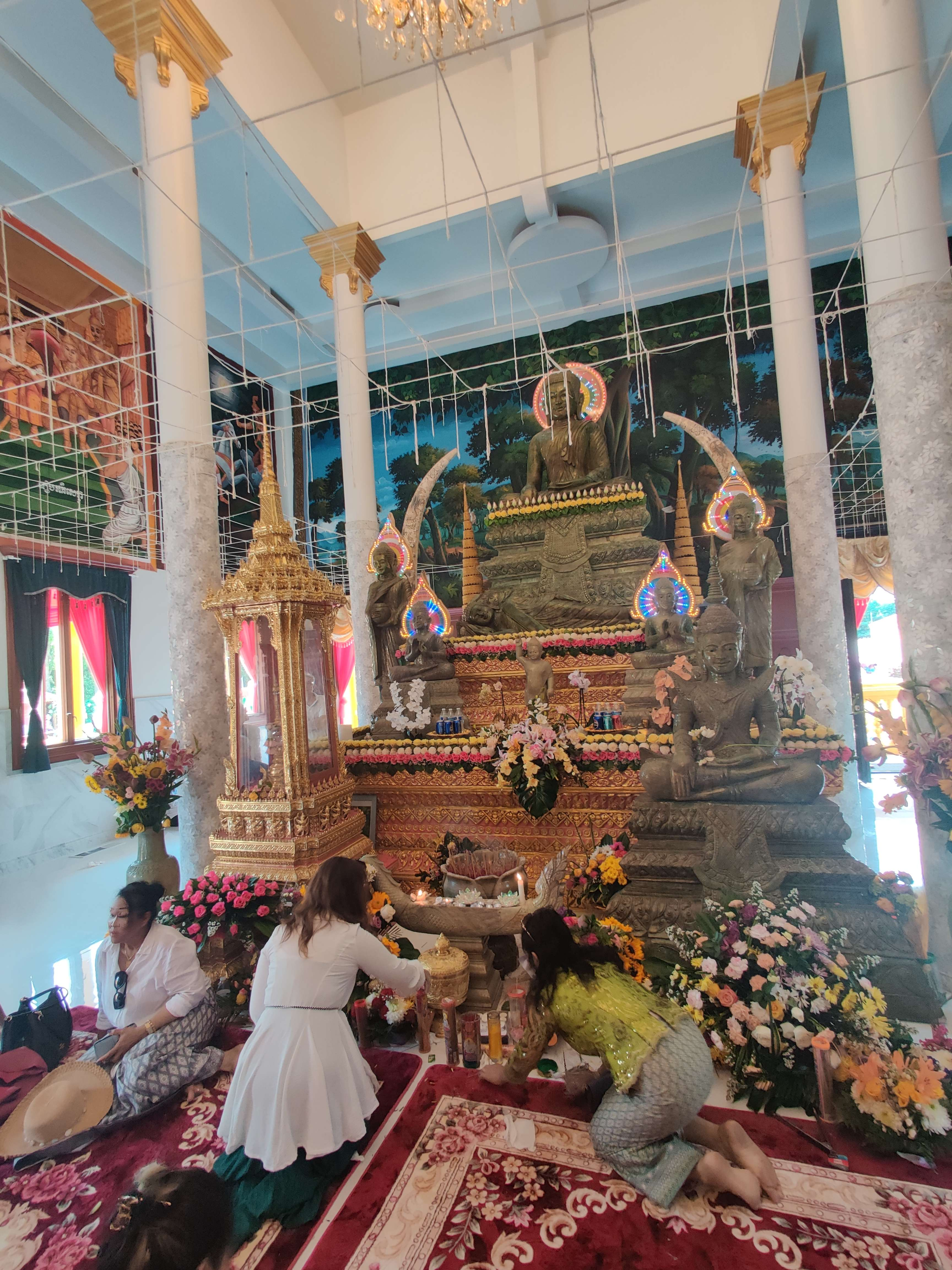
The inside of the main Pagoda of Wat Khmer Palelai Philadelphia during the opening day, featuring statues of the Gautama Buddha and the interior design.
