= Preah Buddha Rangsey Temple =

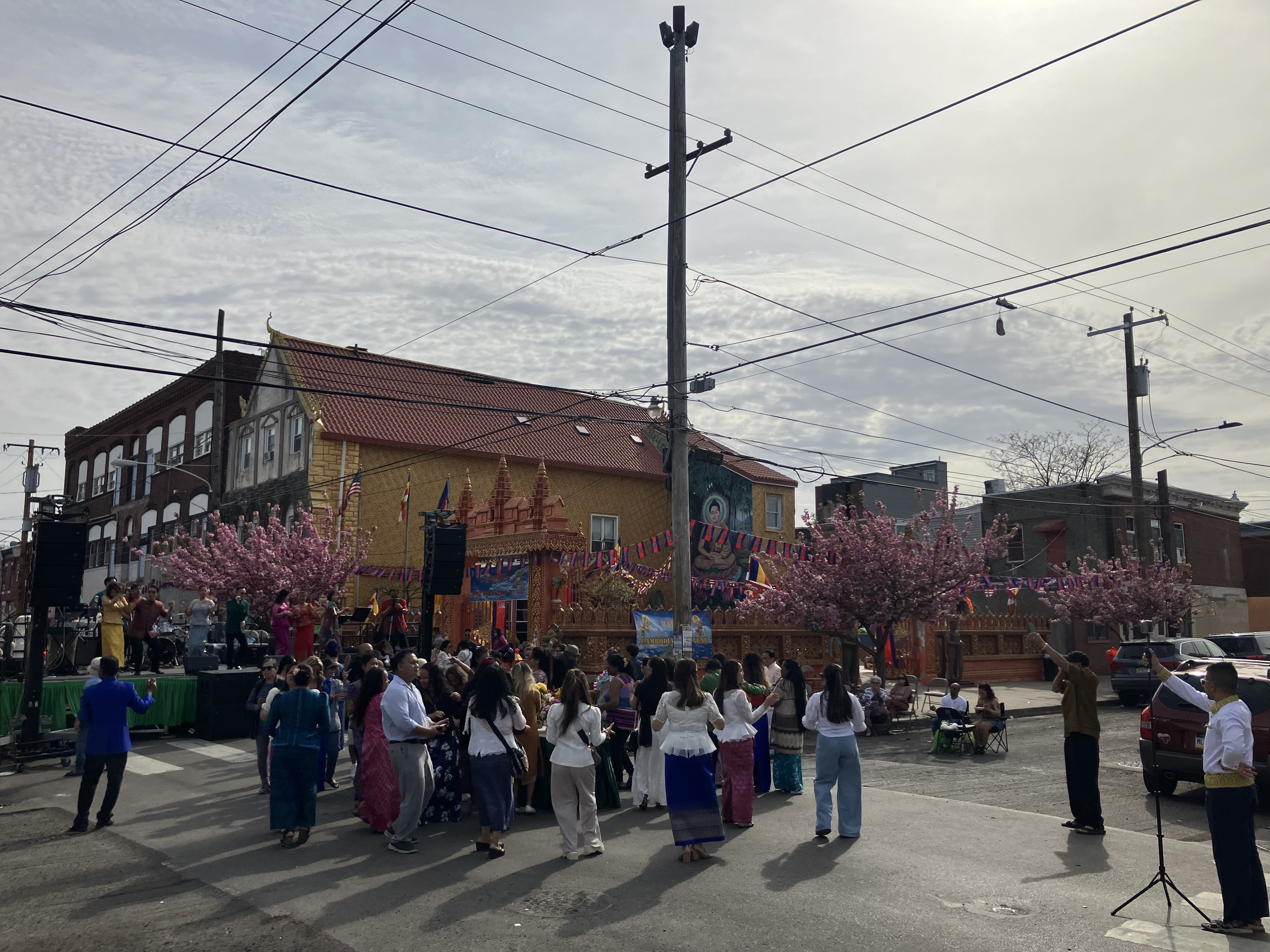
- Preah Buddha Rangsey Temple during Cambodian New Year celebrations, April 2025

- Location within Pennsylvania

Religion
- Affiliation: Buddhism
- Sect: Theravada Buddhist

Location
- Location: Philadelphia
- State: Pennsylvania
- Country: U.S.
- Interactive map of Preah Buddha Rangsey Temple
- Coordinates: 39°55′07.8″N 75°09′26.9″W

Preah Buddha Rangsey Temple, also spelled Phra Buddha Ransi Temple, is a Cambodian Theravada Buddhist temple located in the Whitman neighborhood of Philadelphia, Pennsylvania. In 2004, the Khmer Buddhist Humanitarian Association relocated the temple to the dilapidated St. Andrew's Lutheran Church, which was built in 1903. The temple also managed to acquire a vacant synagogue across the street, that serves as a crematory.

There is also a second location in Voorhees Township, New Jersey. It was founded by the Khmer Buddhist Humanitarian Association and the monks of the first location in Philadelphia they formerly resided in.
