= Little Cambodia =

Ethnic enclave

- Cambodian enclaves are made up mostly of refugees from the country of Cambodia since the 1980s.

Khmer name
- Khmer: ក្រុងខ្មែរ UNGEGN: Krŏng Khmêr; ALA-LC: Krung Khmaer; IPA: [kroŋ kʰmae]

Little Cambodia or Cambodia Town (Khmer: ក្រុងខ្មែរ) is an ethnic enclave of people from the country of Cambodia.

== History ==
Cambodian presence in the West traces back to the French colonisation of Cambodia from the 1860s to mid-1950s, in which a number of Cambodians migrated to France as students or workers. This group formed the basis of the Cambodian population in France.

While some were able to flee to France shortly after the Khmer Rouge took over in 1975, most Cambodians left their country after the regime in the 1980s, with most arriving in the United States (specifically to Long Beach, California; Lowell, Massachusetts, and the New York City borough of the Bronx), as well as Australia (specifically Sydney, Melbourne, and Perth).

== Locations ==
=== United States ===
==== Bronx, New York ====
In the Bronx, Little Cambodia is known for its "... spicy Cambodian noodle soup made with beef, shrimp and fish balls." The Cambodian population was mainly concentrated in the neighbourhoods of Fordham, University Heights and Bronx Park East areas. The Cambodian population in the Bronx and New York City has declined since the 1980s, as many of the Cambodian immigrants moved to California, Massachusetts and Texas.

==== Chamblee, Georgia ====
Buford Highway near Atlanta, Georgia, nicknamed "Chambodia" for the city is named Chamblee, Georgia. This is a common misnomer as there are actually very few Khmer businesses in the Buford Highway area. It is predominantly Chinese, Vietnamese, and Mexican.

==== Long Beach, California ====
Cambodia Town, Long Beach, California "... is a neighborhood in Long Beach's East Side centered on Anaheim Street between Atlantic and Junipero." The community has been around since 1959 which was made up of students from the nearby universities such as the University of Southern California, UCLA, and California State University at Los Angeles, to name a few.

==== Lowell, Massachusetts ====
In 2010, Lowell had the highest proportion of residents of Cambodian origin of any place in the United States at 12.5% of the population. The Government of Cambodia opened up its third U.S. Consular Office in Lowell, on April 27, 2009. The other consular offices are in Long Beach, California, and Seattle, Washington, which also have large Cambodian-American communities. In 2022, Lowell elected Sokhary Chau, the first Cambodian-American mayor in the United States.

In 1999, the municipality had significant numbers of Hmong, lowland Lao, and Vietnamese people.

==== Philadelphia, Pennsylvania ====
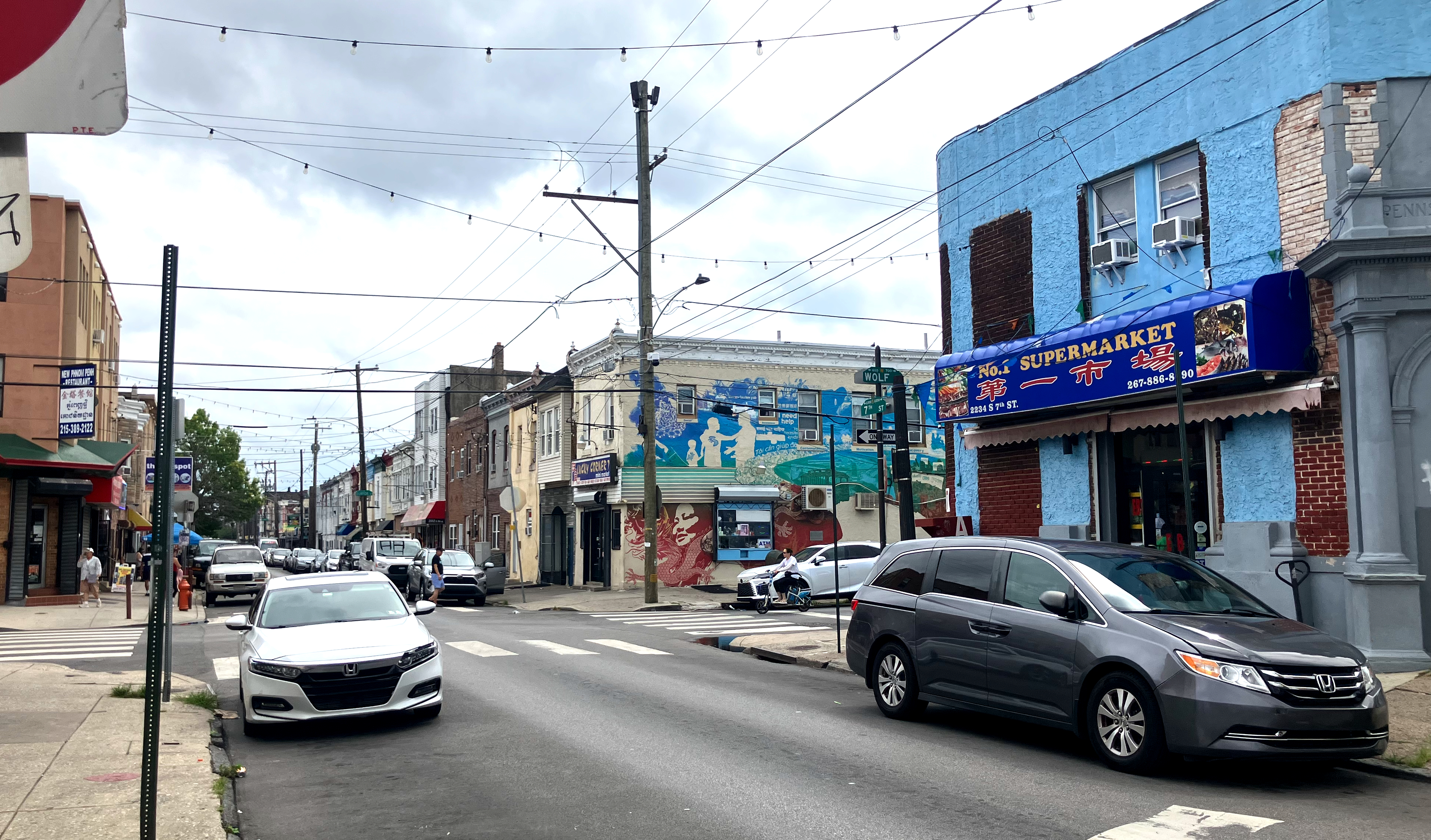
South Philadelphia's Little Cambodia commercial district at 7th St. & Moymansing Avenue, facing south.

Philadelphia's Cambodia Town district is in South Philadelphia at the juncture of the Whitman and Lower Moyamensing neighborhoods, and has long been home to many different groups of immigrants. Exemplifying that, the broader neighborhood surrounding Philly's Cambodia Town is extremely diverse, having been cited as roughly a third white, a third African American and Latino, and a third Asian. By 2010 census numbers, Philadelphia's Cambodia Town is the fourth largest Cambodia Town in the United States, trailing only Long Beach, Lowell, and Stockton. Attempts to officially rename the area "Little Cambodia" were dropped in 2017 due to resistance from longtime African American residents.

Its main commercial corridor is along S. 7th Street — and to some extent S. 6th and even S. 8th Streets — between Morris Street to the north and Oregon Avenue to the south, including Mifflin Square Park. (Others have more narrowly defined the central aspect of this to between Snyder Avenue to the north and Porter Street to the south.) The neighborhood contains extensive references to Cambodian and Khmer culture, including street and business signage as well as Cambodian temples that serve as spiritual and cultural centers. Notably, the diaspora in the community contains, but is not limited to, people who identify as Khmer (ethnic Cambodians from Cambodia), ethnic Chinese from Cambodia, ethnic Cambodians from South Vietnam, and ethnic Vietnamese from Cambodia.

Many Cambodian restaurants in the neighborhood, such as I Heart Cambodia, New Phnom Penh, Heng Seng, Sweet Basil Express, and Sophie's Kitchen, have been recognized in greater Philadelphia-area media for their outstanding food. Cambodian restaurants in other parts of Philadelphia, such as Khmer Grill in Chinatown, Daleng in West Philadelphia, and Nam Vang in Northeast Philadelphia, have also received broader local media attention. Philadelphia's prominent supper club scene also boasts a Khmer supper club hosted by Seri Chao, whose relationship with his wife Catzie Vilayphonh of restaurant Laos in the House has been described as "the Southeast Asian power couple" of Philadelphia.

In addition to the many local Cambodian small businesses in Cambodia Town itself, the Southeast Asian Market in FDR Park is also nearby, directly off the Broad Street Line subway at NRG Station and directly across Broad Street from Lincoln Financial Field, home of the Philadelphia Eagles. Originally started by Cambodia Town's residents as a series of pop-up tents in a parking lot within FDR Park, the market's organizers lobbied for and in 2023 received a permanent structure within the park. In addition to Cambodian stalls, the market also features fare from many other Southeast Asian cultures that have a diaspora community within South Philadelphia, such as from Little Saigon and the Indonesian diaspora traditionally centered in Newbold. The market has received coverage beyond the area, including in national media outlets.

==== San Francisco and Oakland ====
The Tenderloin near Downtown San Francisco has a significant Cambodian population, with Khmer language services and Cambodian restaurants about. Cambodian communities can be found throughout San Francisco, including in the southeast area, as well as in Oakland too, along the International Blvd. area.

==== White Center, Washington ====
- White Center, a suburb of Seattle, has a significant Cambodian-American community (642 Cambodian-Americans; 4.8% of the city's population). There are several Cambodian grocery stores, and Cambodian New Year is celebrated in this city.

=== France ===
==== Lognes ====
With Asians comprising over 40% of the city's population, the Parisian suburb of Lognes has the highest proportion of Asians in France of any city in the country. Vietnamese, Laotian and Cambodian business districts and community services are found throughout the commune. Cambodian community organisations, Buddhist temples and businesses are scattered around Lognes, and Cambodians form the largest Asian group in the city.
