= National Register of Historic Places listings in South Philadelphia =

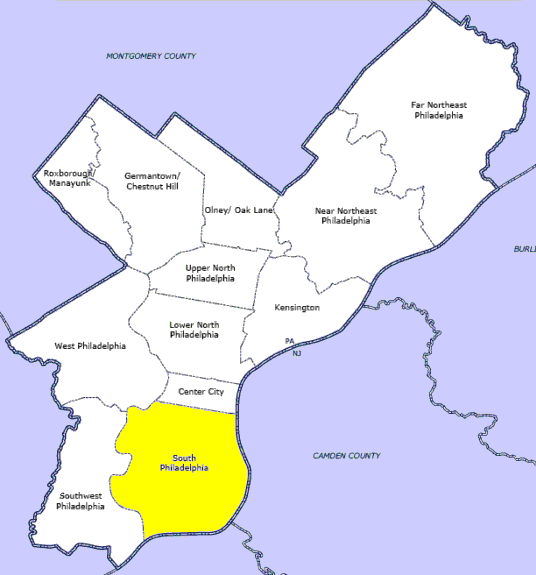
Location of South Philadelphia in Philadelphia

This is a list of the National Register of Historic Places listings in South Philadelphia.

This is intended to be a complete list of the properties and districts on the National Register of Historic Places in South Philadelphia, Pennsylvania, United States. The locations of National Register properties and districts for which the latitude and longitude coordinates are included below may be seen in an online map.

There are more than 600 properties and districts listed on the National Register in Philadelphia, including 67 National Historic Landmarks. South Philadelphia includes 65 of these properties and districts, including 2 National Historic Landmarks; the city's remaining properties and districts are listed elsewhere. One site is split between South Philadelphia and other parts of the city, and is thus included on multiple lists.

== Current listings ==
	Name on the Register	Image	Date listed	Location	Neighborhood	Description
1	James Alcorn School	James Alcorn School	November 18, 1988 (#88002225)	1500 South 32nd Street; 39°56′07″N 75°11′51″W	Grays Ferry	
2	Marian Anderson House	Marian Anderson House	April 14, 2011 (#11000198)	762 South Martin Street; 39°56′32″N 75°10′29″W	Southwest Center City	
3	Charles Y. Audenried Junior High School	Charles Y. Audenried Junior High School	November 18, 1988 (#88002239)	1601 South 33rd Street; 39°56′01″N 75°11′58″W	Grays Ferry	The photo shows the replacement school on the same site
4	Baptist Institute for Christian Workers	Baptist Institute for Christian Workers	April 21, 1983 (#83002265)	1427 Snyder Avenue; 39°55′29″N 75°10′14″W	West Passyunk	
5	Bartlett School	Bartlett School	December 4, 1986 (#86003315)	1100 Catharine Street; 39°56′24″N 75°09′42″W	Hawthorne	
6	Bethel Burial Ground	Bethel Burial Ground	January 5, 2016 (#15000734)	415 Queen Street; 39°56′16″N 75°09′04″W	Queen Village	
7	Edward Bok Vocational School	Edward Bok Vocational School	December 4, 1986 (#86003264)	1901 South 9th Street; 39°55′33″N 75°09′37″W	Central South Philadelphia	
8	F. Amadee Bregy School	F. Amadee Bregy School	November 18, 1988 (#88002249)	1700 Bigler Street; 39°54′52″N 75°10′36″W	Marconi Plaza	
9	George W. Childs School	George W. Childs School	November 18, 1988 (#88002257)	1501 South 17th Street; 39°55′53″N 75°10′22″W	Point Breeze	Built 1894–96, designed by Joseph Anschutz
10	Commandant's Quarters	Commandant's Quarters	June 3, 1976 (#76001661)	U.S. Naval Base; 39°53′48″N 75°10′38″W	Navy Yard	
11	Francis M. Drexel School	Francis M. Drexel School	December 4, 1986 (#86003272)	1800 South 16th Street; 39°55′42″N 75°10′23″W	Point Breeze	Built 1888–89, designed by Joseph Anschutz; Demolished Feb., 2010
12	Federal Street School	Federal Street School	December 1, 1986 (#86003294)	1130–1148 Federal Street; 39°56′05″N 75°09′48″W	Passyunk Square	
13	D. Newlin Fell School	D. Newlin Fell School	November 18, 1988 (#88002268)	900 Oregon Avenue; 39°54′56″N 75°09′48″W	East Oregon	
14	First Federal Savings & Loan Association of Philadelphia	First Federal Savings & Loan Association of Philadelphia	August 8, 2025 (#100012081)	1330-32 Point Breeze Avenue; 39°56′05″N 75°10′47″W	Point Breeze	
15	Samuel S. Fleisher Art Memorial	Samuel S. Fleisher Art Memorial	November 14, 1982 (#82001547)	711–721 Catharine Street; 39°56′21″N 75°09′18″W	Bella Vista	
16	Franklin Hose Company No. 28	Franklin Hose Company No. 28	December 3, 1980 (#80003604)	730–732 South Broad Street; 39°56′32″N 75°09′58″W	Southwest Center City	
17	Horace Furness Junior High School	Horace Furness Junior High School	December 1, 1986 (#86003286)	1900 South 3rd Street; 39°55′26″N 75°09′03″W	Pennsport	
18	Gloria Dei (Old Swedes') Church National Historic Site	Gloria Dei (Old Swedes') Church National Historic Site	October 15, 1966 (#66000682)	Swanson Street, between Christian and Water Streets; 39°56′04″N 75°08′38″W	Queen Village	
19	Grays Road Recreation Center	Grays Road Recreation Center	April 21, 1988 (#88000448)	2501 Christian Street; 39°56′33″N 75°11′06″W	Grays Ferry	
20	Frances Ellen Watkins Harper House	Frances Ellen Watkins Harper House	December 8, 1976 (#76001663)	1006 Bainbridge Street; 39°56′31″N 75°09′34″W	Bella Vista	
21	Nathaniel Hawthorne School	Nathaniel Hawthorne School	December 4, 1986 (#86003289)	712 South 12th Street; 39°56′30″N 75°09′44″W	Hawthorne	
22	Howell and Brothers Paper Hangings Manufactory	Howell and Brothers Paper Hangings Manufactory	December 21, 2017 (#100001912)	2101 Washington Avenue; 39°56′22″N 75°10′45″W	Southwest Center City	Built 1865. Demolished in 2018.
23	Institute for Colored Youth	Institute for Colored Youth	December 4, 1986 (#86003324)	10th and Bainbridge Streets; 39°56′31″N 75°09′28″W	Bella Vista	
24	Nathaniel Irish House	Nathaniel Irish House	March 16, 1972 (#72001160)	704 South Front Street; 39°56′24″N 75°08′40″W	Queen Village	
25	Francis Scott Key School	Francis Scott Key School	December 1, 1986 (#86003296)	2238 South 8th Street; 39°55′15″N 75°09′38″W	Central South Philadelphia	Built 1889, designed by Joseph Anschutz
26	Eliza Butler Kirkbride School	Eliza Butler Kirkbride School	November 18, 1988 (#88002290)	626 Dickinson Street; 39°55′48″N 75°09′22″W	Passyunk Square	
27	David Landreth School	David Landreth School	December 4, 1986 (#86003299)	1201 South 23rd Street; 39°56′16″N 75°10′54″W	Point Breeze	Built 1889, designed by Joseph Anschutz
28	Marine Barracks	Marine Barracks	July 13, 1976 (#76001664)	Building 100, Philadelphia Naval Shipyard, 4800 S. 13th Street; 39°53′32″N 75°10′28″W	Navy Yard	
29	Marine Corps Depot of Supplies, Schuylkill Warehouse	Marine Corps Depot of Supplies, Schuylkill Warehouse	November 12, 2004 (#04001228)	700–734 Schuylkill Avenue; 39°56′41″N 75°11′12″W	Schuylkill	
30	Marine Corps Supply Activity	Marine Corps Supply Activity	August 6, 1975 (#75001662)	1100 South Broad Street; 39°56′15″N 75°10′02″W	Point Breeze	
31	Delaplaine McDaniel School	Delaplaine McDaniel School	December 4, 1986 (#86003303)	2100 Moore Street; 39°55′46″N 75°10′53″W	Point Breeze	
32	William M. Meredith School	William M. Meredith School	December 4, 1986 (#86003307)	5th and Fitzwater Streets; 39°56′23″N 75°09′03″W	Queen Village	
33	Capt. Thomas Moore House	Capt. Thomas Moore House	March 16, 1972 (#72001165)	702 South Front Street; 39°56′24″N 75°08′40″W	Queen Village	
34	George W. Nebinger School	George W. Nebinger School	November 18, 1988 (#88002303)	601–627 Carpenter Street; 39°56′12″N 75°09′14″W	Bella Vista	
35	Jeremiah Nichols School	Jeremiah Nichols School	November 18, 1988 (#88002241)	1235 South 16th Street; 39°56′06″N 75°10′14″W	Point Breeze	
36	William S. Peirce School	William S. Peirce School	November 18, 1988 (#88002307)	2400 Christian Street; 39°56′30″N 75°10′58″W	Southwest Center City	
37	Philadelphia Macaroni Company Factory		February 17, 2026 (#100012716)	1101 Catharine Street; 39°56′25″N 75°09′40″W	South Philadelphia	
38	Philadelphia Naval Shipyard Historic District	Philadelphia Naval Shipyard Historic District	December 22, 1999 (#99001579)	South Broad Street; 39°53′N 75°11′W	Navy Yard	
39	Philadelphia Quartermaster Depot	Philadelphia Quartermaster Depot	January 26, 2010 (#09001212)	2724 South 20th Street; 39°54′59″N 75°10′57″W	Girard Estate	
40	Philadelphia, Wilmington and Baltimore Railroad Freight Shed	Philadelphia, Wilmington and Baltimore Railroad Freight Shed	September 8, 2011 (#11000649)	1001 South 15th Street; 39°56′21″N 75°10′04″W	Southwest Center City	
41	Edgar Allan Poe School	Edgar Allan Poe School	December 4, 1986 (#86003318)	2136 Ritner Street; 39°55′20″N 75°10′59″W	Girard Estate	
42	Robert Ralston School	Robert Ralston School	December 4, 1986 (#86003321)	221 Bainbridge Street; 39°56′26″N 75°08′48″W	Queen Village	
43	Royal Theater	Royal Theater	February 8, 1980 (#80003619)	1524–1534 South Street; 39°56′38″N 75°10′06″W	Southwest Center City	
44	St. Anthony de Padua Parish School	St. Anthony de Padua Parish School	May 7, 1992 (#92000400)	2325 Carpenter Street; 39°56′28″N 75°10′56″W	Southwest Center City	
45	St. Elisabeth's Episcopal Church	St. Elisabeth's Episcopal Church	January 3, 2025 (#100011232)	1900 S. 16th Street; 39°55′37″N 75°10′21″W		
46	St. Gabriel's Roman Catholic Church Complex	St. Gabriel's Roman Catholic Church Complex	January 14, 2021 (#100006036)	1440 South 29th Street; 2922-28 and 2930-36 Dickinson Street; 39°56′06″N 75°11′37″W	Grays Ferry	
47	George Sharswood School	George Sharswood School	November 18, 1988 (#88002320)	200 Wolf Street; 39°55′07″N 75°09′03″W	Whitman	
48	Walter George Smith School	Walter George Smith School	December 4, 1986 (#86003329)	1300 South 19th Street; 39°56′06″N 75°10′33″W	Point Breeze	
49	South Front Street Historic District	South Front Street Historic District	April 25, 1972 (#72001171)	700 block of South Front Street, western side of Bainbridge Street to Kenilworth Street; 39°56′24″N 75°08′40″W	Queen Village	
50	Southwark District	Southwark District	May 19, 1972 (#72001172)	Bounded by Delaware & Washington Avenues; 5th, Lombard, Front, and Catherine Streets; 39°56′16″N 75°08′54″W	Southwark	
51	Southwark Municipal Piers	Southwark Municipal Piers	July 26, 2024 (#100010585)	B775 S. Christopher Columbus Blvd. 39°56′15″N 75°08′31″W	Southwark	
52	Southwark School	Southwark School	December 1, 1986 (#86003330)	8th and Miflin Streets; 39°55′31″N 75°09′36″W	Central South Philadelphia	
53	SS United States (Steamship)	SS United States (Steamship)	June 3, 1999 (#99000609)	Pier 82; 39°55′06″N 75°08′11″W	Whitman	Moving toward Florida (February 2025) to become a reef
54	Edwin M. Stanton School	Edwin M. Stanton School	November 18, 1988 (#88002326)	1630 Christian Street; 39°56′25″N 75°10′15″W	Southwest Center City	
55	George C. Thomas Junior High School	George C. Thomas Junior High School	November 18, 1988 (#88002330)	2746 South 9th Street; 39°54′56″N 75°09′48″W	East Oregon	
56	Tindley Temple United Methodist Church	Tindley Temple United Methodist Church	April 15, 2011 (#11000199)	756 South Broad Street; 39°56′29″N 75°09′59″W	Southwest Center City	
57	U.S. Naval Home	U.S. Naval Home	August 21, 1972 (#72001173)	Gray's Ferry Avenue at S. 24th Street; 39°56′38″N 75°11′01″W	Southwest Center City	
58	University Avenue Bridge	University Avenue Bridge	May 26, 1994 (#94000515)	South University Avenue over the Schuylkill River; 39°56′34″N 75°11′49″W	Grays Ferry	Extends into West Philadelphia
59	Abigail Vare School	Abigail Vare School	December 4, 1986 (#86003339)	Morris Street and Moyamensing Avenue; 39°55′38″N 75°09′03″W	Pennsport	
60	Edwin H. Vare Junior High School	Edwin H. Vare Junior High School	November 18, 1988 (#88002331)	2100 South 24th Street; 39°55′33″N 75°11′09″W	Wilson Park	
61	Washington Avenue Historic District	Washington Avenue Historic District	September 7, 1984 (#84003561)	Roughly bounded by Carpenter, Washington, 10th, and Broad Streets; 39°56′17″N 75°09′44″W	Hawthorne	
62	George Washington School	George Washington School	December 4, 1986 (#86003343)	5th and Federal Streets; 39°56′01″N 75°09′10″W	Dickinson Narrows	
63	Anthony Wayne School	Anthony Wayne School	December 1, 1986 (#86003344)	2700 Morris Street; 39°55′55″N 75°11′28″W	Grays Ferry	
64	Widow Maloby's Tavern	Widow Maloby's Tavern	March 16, 1972 (#72001175)	700 South Front Street; 39°56′24″N 75°08′40″W	Queen Village	
65	James Wilson Public School	James Wilson Public School	December 12, 2012 (#88002238)	1148 Wharton Street; 39°56′01″N 75°09′49″W	Passyunk Square	

== See also ==
- List of National Historic Landmarks in Philadelphia
- National Register of Historic Places listings in Philadelphia, Pennsylvania
