= William S. Peirce =

William S. Peirce may refer to:

- William S. Peirce (United States Army officer)

== See also ==
- William S. Peirce School, Philadelphia, Pennsylvania
- William S. Pierce, cardiothoracic surgeon and chemical engineer
