= Southwest Center City Philadelphia =

Southwest Center City Graduate Hospital South of South
- Neighborhood of Philadelphia
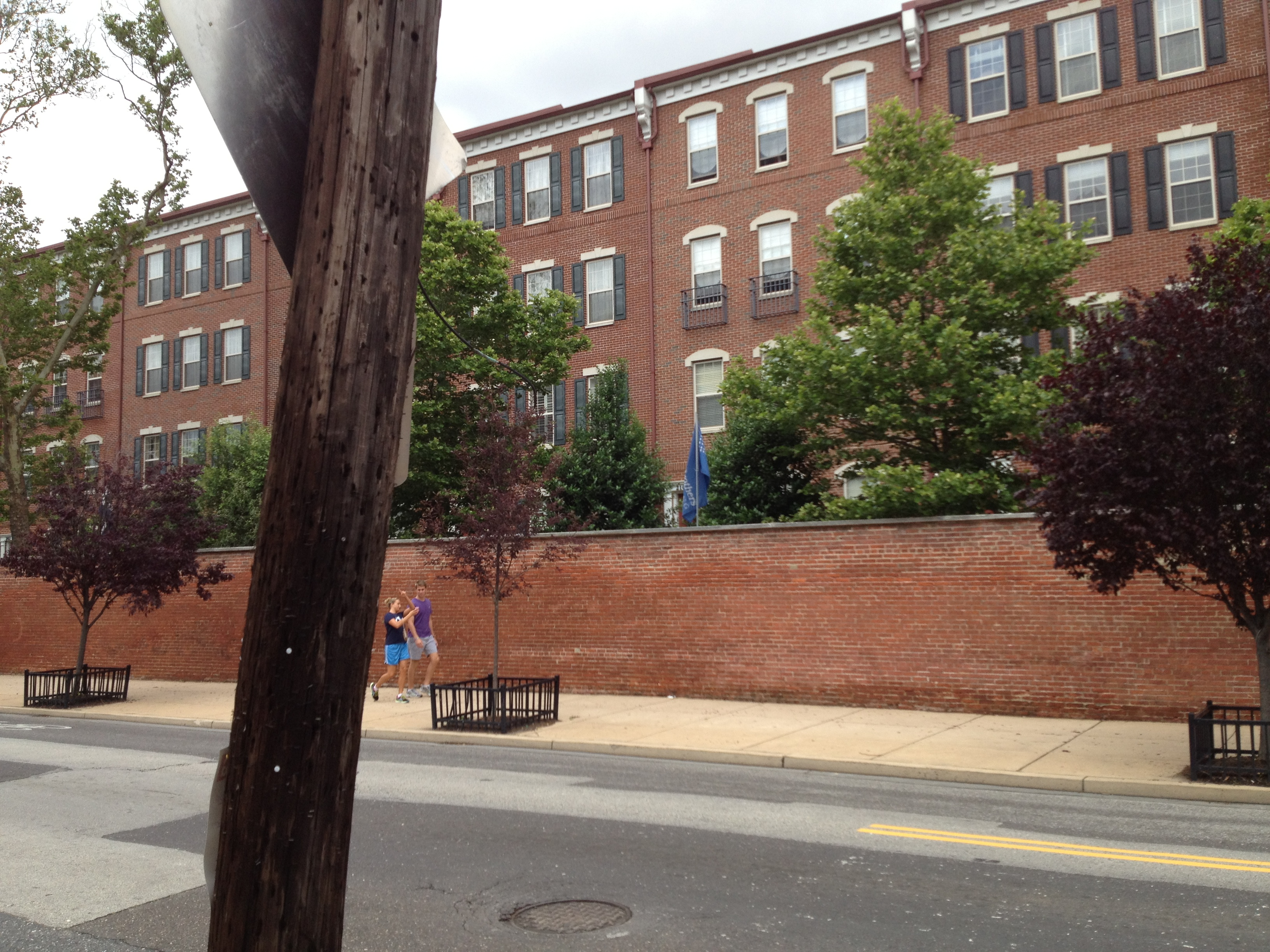
- Naval Square

- Location within Philadelphia
- Country: United States of America
- State: Pennsylvania
- County: Philadelphia
- City: Philadelphia

Area
  - Total: 0.391 sq mi (1.01 km^{2})

Population (2010)
  - Total: 14,919
  - Density: 38,130/sq mi (14,720/km^{2})
- ZIP Code: 19146

Southwest Center City (SWCC), also known as Graduate Hospital, is a neighborhood that is located in Center City Philadelphia.

The neighborhood is bordered on the north by South Street, on the south by Washington Avenue, on the west by the Schuylkill River, and on the east by Broad Street.

It is an area adjacent to the Fitler Square and Rittenhouse Square neighborhoods to the north and Point Breeze to the south, and is home to community service organizations, restaurants, churches, retail establishments, and some light industry.

== Names ==
The neighborhood has many nicknames. The Philadelphia Planning Commission refers to it as Southwest Center City. Since the 1980s, it has been often referred to as Graduate Hospital, after the medical facility on the northern edge of the neighborhood. This name has become merely historical in nature since the hospital closed in 2007. Despite this, it is still used and is sometimes shortened to G-Ho. The area is also referred to as South of South or So-So. A small corner of this area is sometimes known as Devil's Pocket.

== Composition ==
The neighborhood consists primarily of nineteenth and twentieth-century rowhouses interspersed with corner stores, 22 churches and a few larger architectural landmarks. On the eastern half of the neighborhood is the Scottish Rite affordable housing complex which consists of two multi-story apartment buildings that cater mostly to elderly and low income individuals. The former buildings of Graduate Hospital lie on South Street, the northern border of the neighborhood. Along Grays Ferry Avenue is the former Philadelphia Naval Asylum or Naval Home, designed in 1826 by William Strickland. This National Historic Landmark, first constructed in 1833, closed in 1976, and has been developed into condos is now known as Naval Square. The Schuylkill Arsenal was originally built at the edge of this neighborhood, but has since been demolished.

== History ==
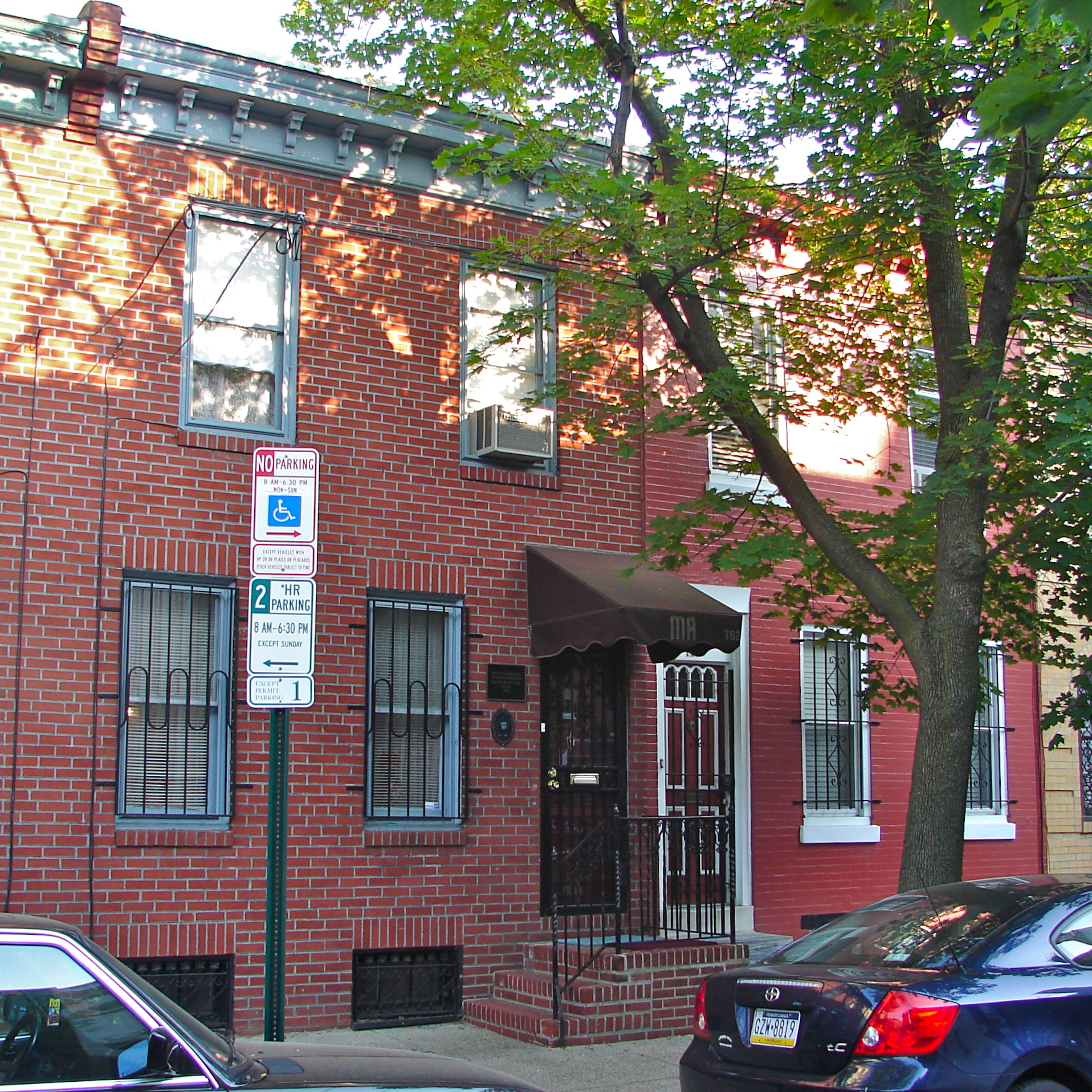
Marian Anderson House on Martin Street

Prior to the Act of Consolidation, 1854, this neighborhood was part of Moyamensing Township. Moyamensing was originally chartered by the Dutch governor Alexander d'Hinoyossa, and in 1684, William Penn confirmed the title.

The neighborhood began taking shape after the Civil War. In 1870, it was predominantly an Irish American community; however, the neighborhood was in a transitional period, and by 1920, a majority of its residents were African Americans. It continued to experience significant in-migration from the south prior to, during, and immediately after World War II. It remained a solid working-class neighborhood for most of the first half of the twentieth century.

In the 1960s a crosstown expressway running along South Street was planned. This would have created a barrier between Center City and the neighborhoods to the south. The result was widespread abandonment of properties in SWCC and the decay of the South Street business corridor. The loss of jobs and residents caused the neighborhood to decline as buildings were abandoned and left to deteriorate.

The Marian Anderson House, Franklin Hose Company No. 28, William S. Peirce School, Philadelphia, Wilmington and Baltimore Railroad Freight Shed, Royal Theater, St. Anthony de Padua Parish School, Edwin M. Stanton School, and Tindley Temple United Methodist Church are listed on the National Register of Historic Places.

== Recent development ==
In recent years, the area has experienced growth and gentrification. Hundreds of single family homes and condominium units have been built or refurbished. As a result of the neighborhood's proximity to Center City and increasing desirability, a variety of new businesses catering to the increasingly gentrified population have opened. Despite the improvements, the neighborhood still contains some abandoned and dilapidated housing, especially towards the south.

The Grammy Award winning musician and local resident Kenneth Gamble founded Universal Companies in Southwest Center City to revitalize the neighborhood. Universal Community Homes, a division of the company, began the Universal Court housing project in the neighborhood in the 1990s. Originally, some tension existed between the company and the local South of South Neighborhood Association, but this was soon resolved as the project was deemed a success. Universal Companies has since opened several small neighborhood businesses, low-income housing, and a charter school.

=== Children's Hospital Expansion 2017 ===
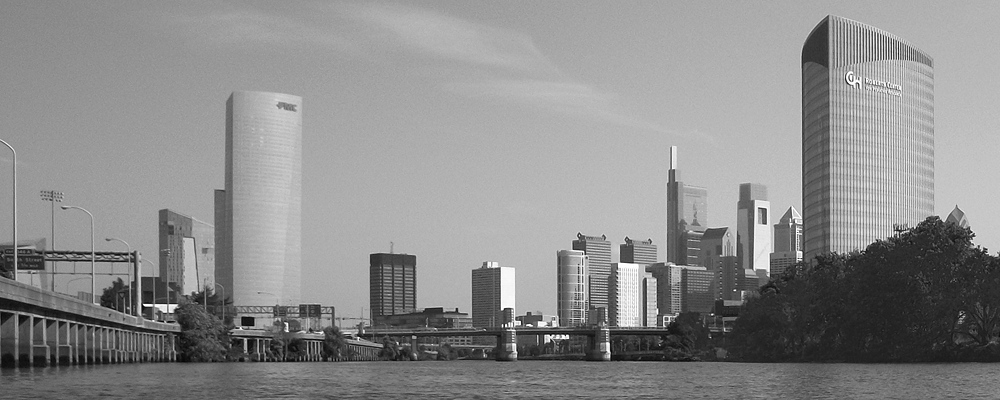
The Roberts Center for Pediatric Research is at the right.

The Children's Hospital of Philadelphia is expanding in the western part of the neighborhood and opened its first facility in 2017 along the Schuykill River. It replaced the Springfield Beer Distributor and the former JFK Vocational Center (earlier the Marine Corps Depot of Supplies), which were demolished. The Philadelphia Inquirer states that the area will be undergoing gentrification to the point that the area may no longer be known by its current name "Devil's Pocket." Furthermore, the area is expected to become a major contributor to Philadelphia's economy with the potential of $63 billion pumped into the economy as well as a job generator. The hospital has hired a consultant to plan the traffic patterns around the area as they did for Delaware Waterfront and New York's Battery Park. The plan is for "... three towers, of about 26 stories each, would be lined up along Schuylkill Avenue." The plans unveiled by the city show that Schuylkill Avenue is part of a six region area that also includes University City all the way to the Philadelphia International Airport that is part of a revitalization plan to stimulate the region.

The proposal for three new Schuylkill Avenue towers proposed by the Children's Hospital of Philadelphia is for the towers to take the place of the Springfield Beer Distributor, and the former JFK Vocational School, with each tower being 26 stories high.

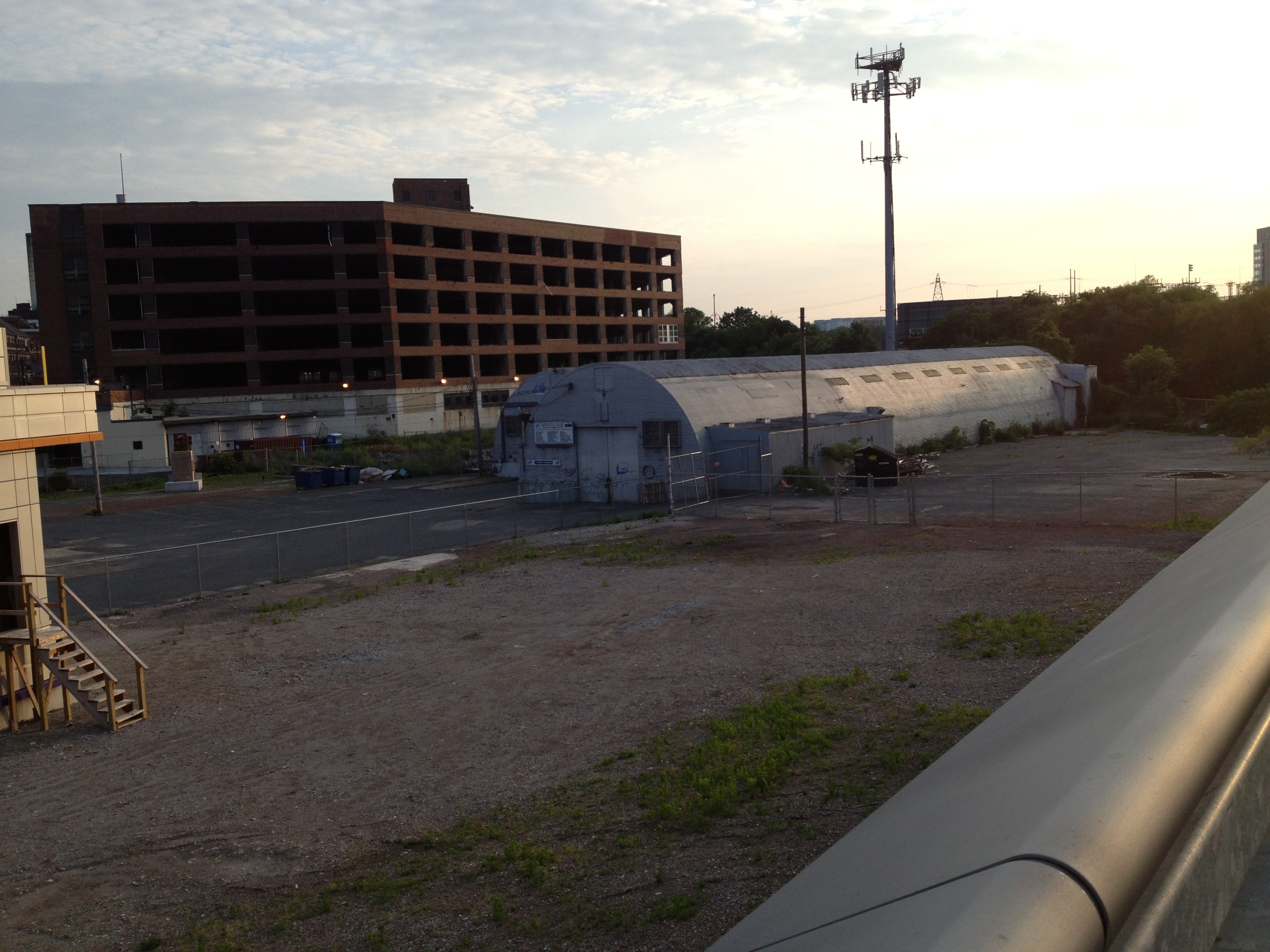
CHOP plans to build on these 2 properties, with the JFK Vocational School (in the back) and Springfield Beer Distributor in the front.

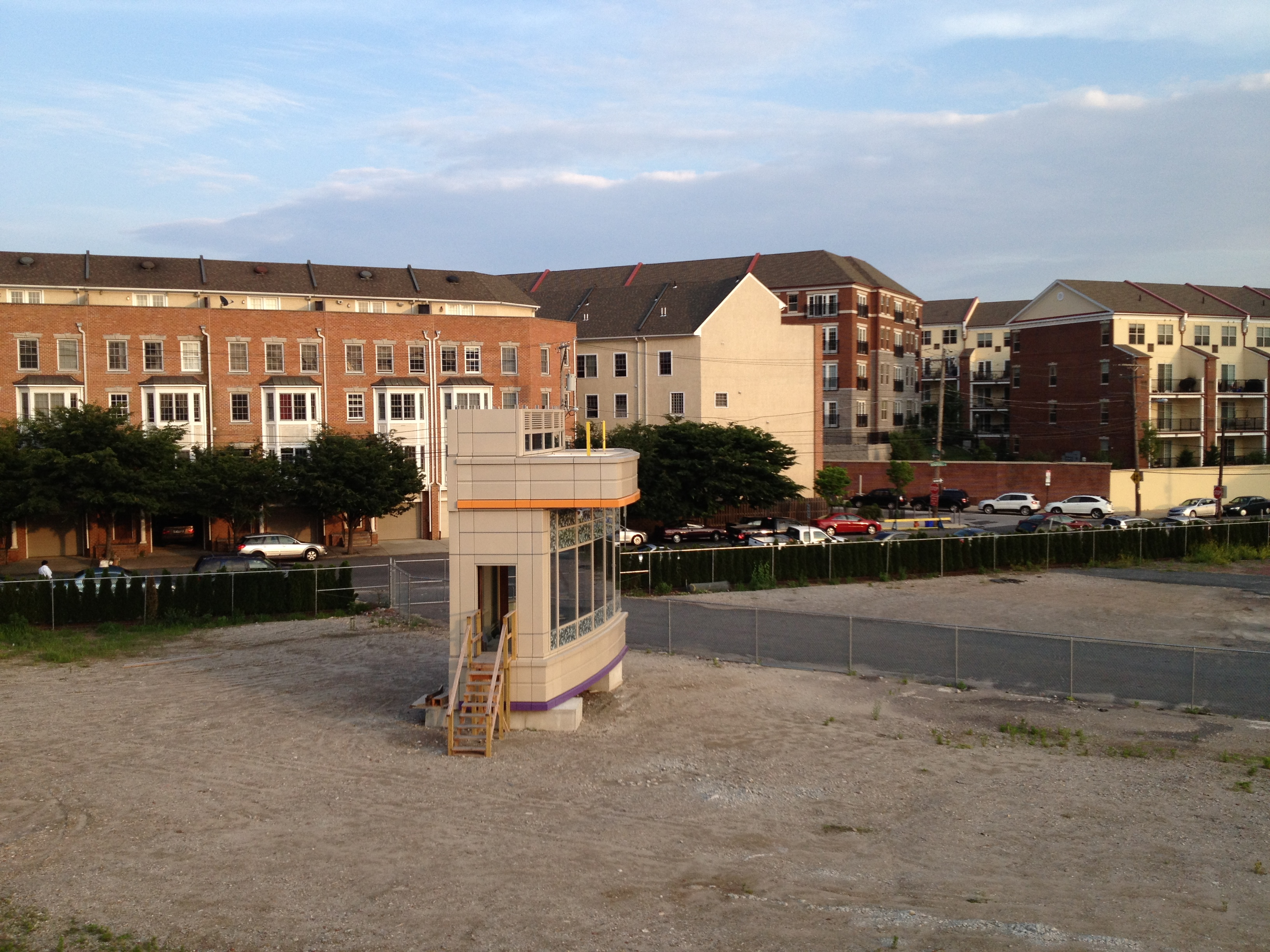
CHOP prototype of building facade for demonstration

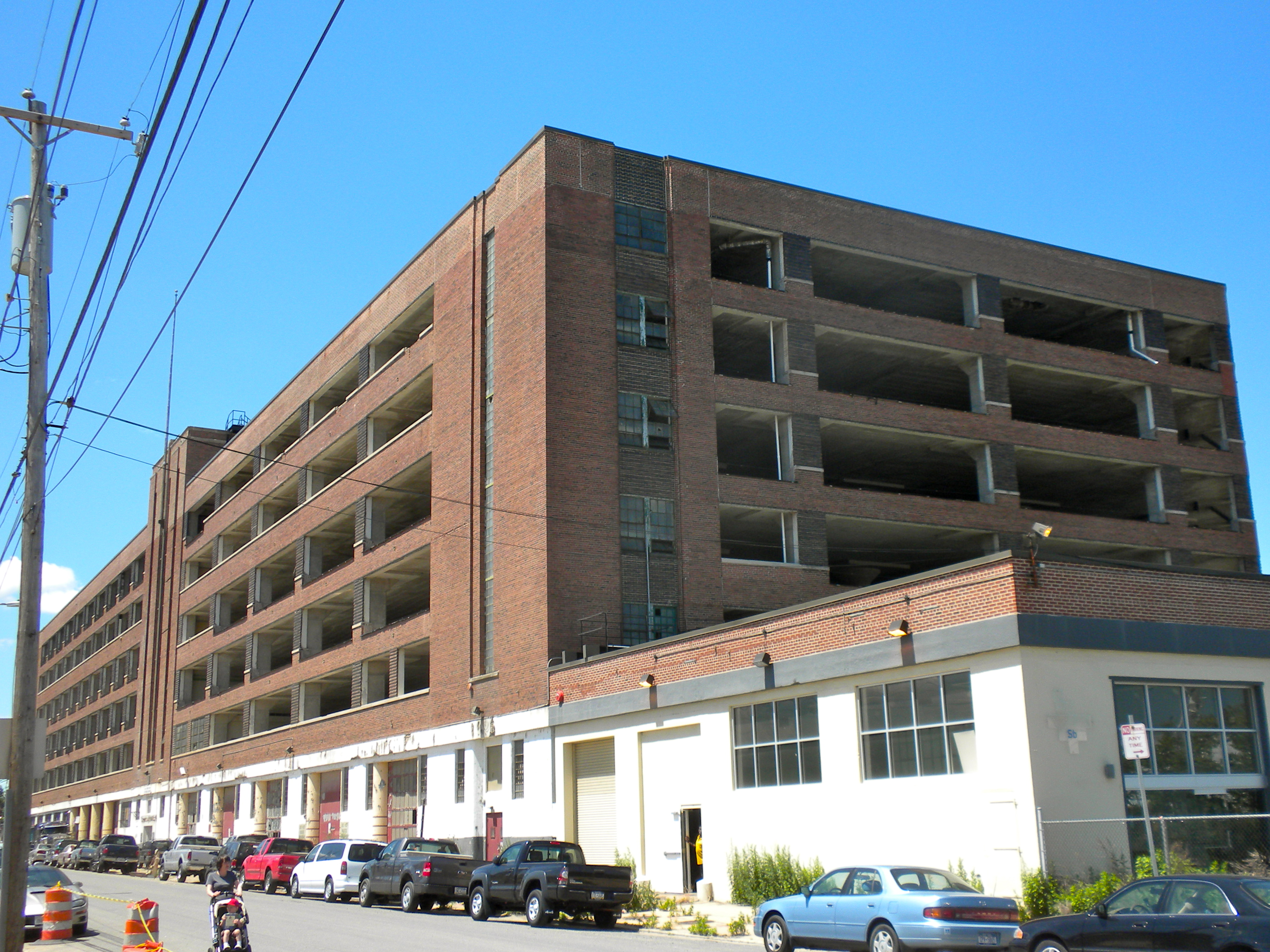
The Marine Corps Depot of Supplies, Schuylkill Warehouse

== Culture ==
Every year since 1975, the area hosts Philadelphia's Odunde festival, a one-day festival and mostly a street market catered to African-American interests and the African diaspora. It is derived from the tradition of the Yoruba people of Nigeria, in celebration of the new year. It is centered at the intersection of Grays Ferry Avenue and South Street.
