= Watson Comly School =

- U.S. National Register of Historic Places
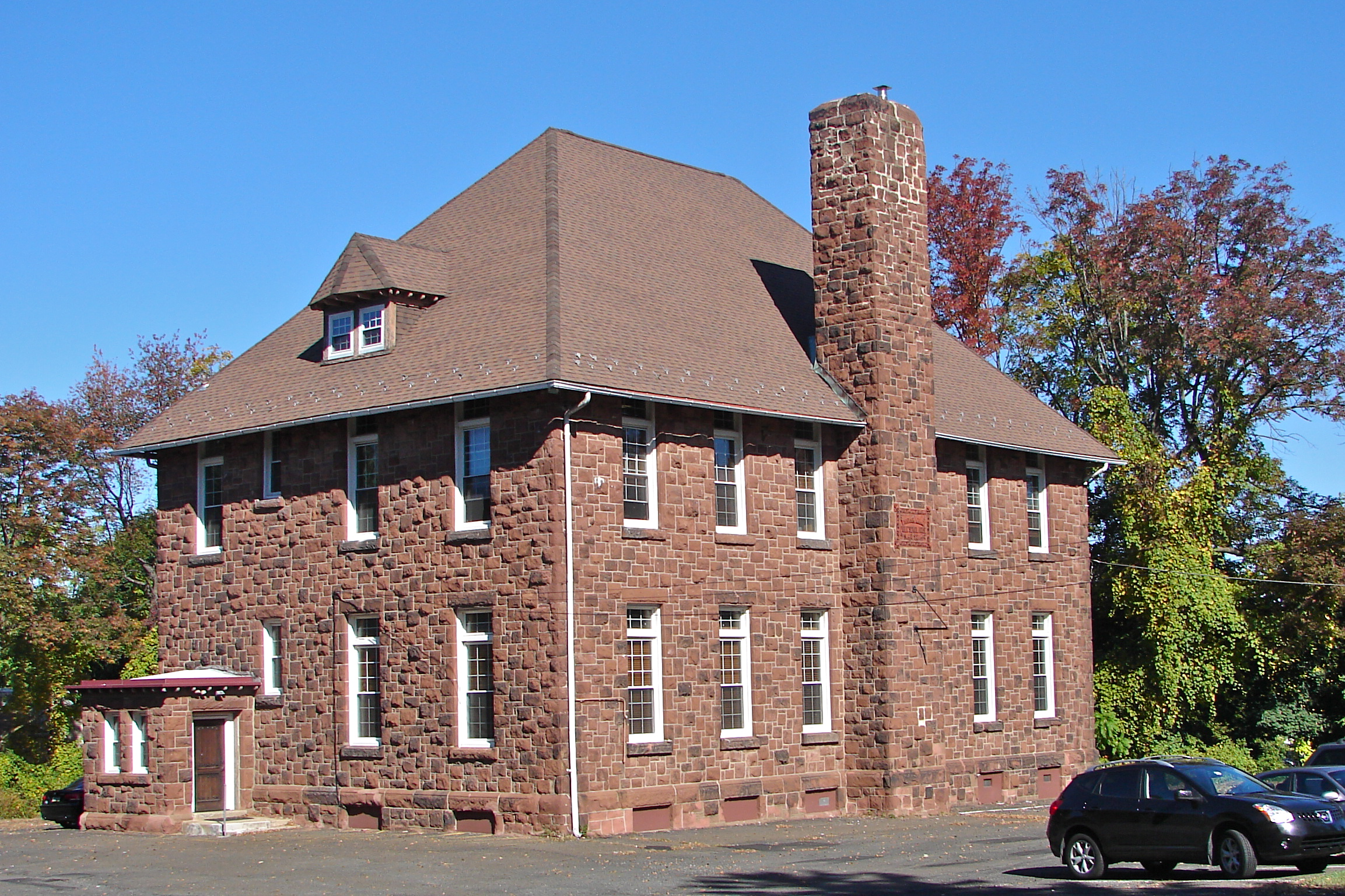
- Watson Comly School, October 2010

- Location within Philadelphia Location within Pennsylvania Location within the United States
- Location: 13250 Trevose Rd., Philadelphia, Pennsylvania
- Coordinates: 40.1266°N 75.0128°W
- Area: 8 acres (3.2 ha)
- Built: 1892–1893
- Built by: L. Dieterich
- Architect: Joseph Anschutz
- Architectural style: Colonial Revival
- MPS: Philadelphia Public Schools TR
- NRHP reference No.: 88002324
- Added to NRHP: November 18, 1988

Watson Comly School, also known as Somerton Masonic Hall, is a historic school building located in the Somerton neighborhood of Philadelphia, Pennsylvania.

Built in 1892–1893, it is a two-story, four-bay, brownstone building in the Colonial Revival style. It features a one-story stone entrance pavilion and large hipped roof with stone chimney. The school was named for Watson Comly, a local resident who held many public offices, including serving several terms as a representative in the state legislature.

The building served as a school from its completion until 1928, when it was replaced by a larger building on Byberry Road. The same year, the site was acquired by the Masons, in exchange for the land on which the new school was built. The Masons used it for many years from 1930 as a lodge hall.

The site was added to the National Register of Historic Places in 1988.
