= Naval Square, Philadelphia =

Neighborhood of Philadelphia, Pennsylvania

Naval Square
- Neighborhood of Philadelphia
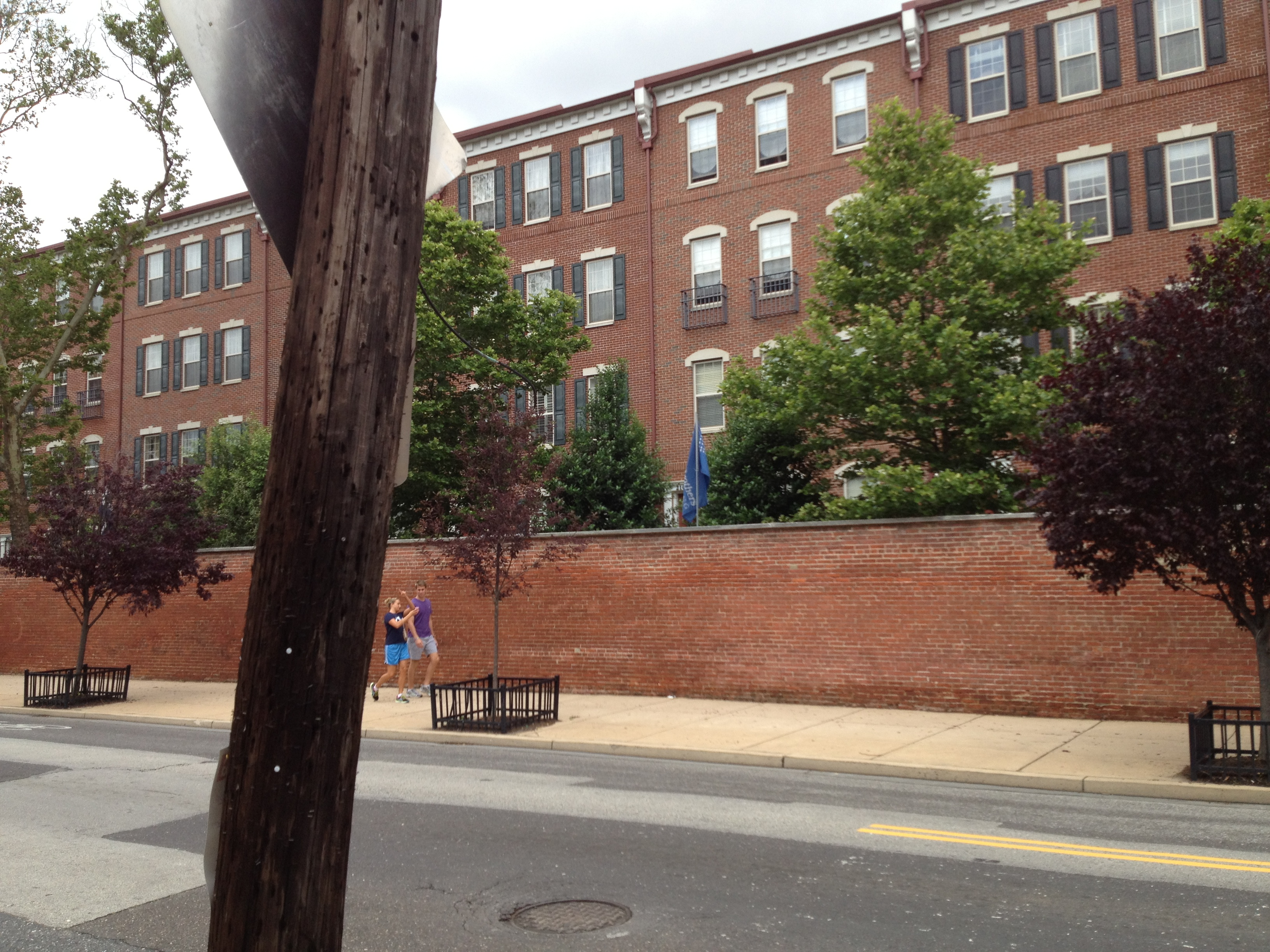
- The Naval Square gated neighborhood behind wall on Grays Ferry Avenue

- Location within Philadelphia
- Coordinates: 39°57′12″N 75°10′12″W
- Country: United States
- State: Pennsylvania
- County: Philadelphia
- City: Philadelphia
- ZIP Code: 19146
- Area codes: 215, 267 and 445

Naval Square is a gated community within the Graduate Hospital neighborhood of Philadelphia that served as the first United States Naval Academy from 1838 to 1845, when the Naval Academy formed in Annapolis. It continued as a retirement home for sailors and Marines and was called the Naval Home until 1976, when the facility was relocated to Mississippi.

According to the Office of Housing and Community Development, the neighborhood became official, as the three independent parties, the city of Philadelphia (Office of Housing and Community Development), the OHNP (Office of Housing and Neighborhood Preservation), and Toll Brothers worked to bring the historic location to prominence. The Philadelphia Inquirer said that the neighborhood, considered a condo development, succeeded in bucking "the trend with what buyers cited as a combination of location, security, and newness." Prices for houses ranged from $300,000 to $900,000, with 618 units built.

== Features ==
Set on more than 20 acres (8.1 ha), the campus includes three buildings designed by architect William Strickland that are considered some of the best examples of Greek Revival architecture in the United States: Biddle Hall (the 1833 main building), the surgeon's residence and the governor's residence.

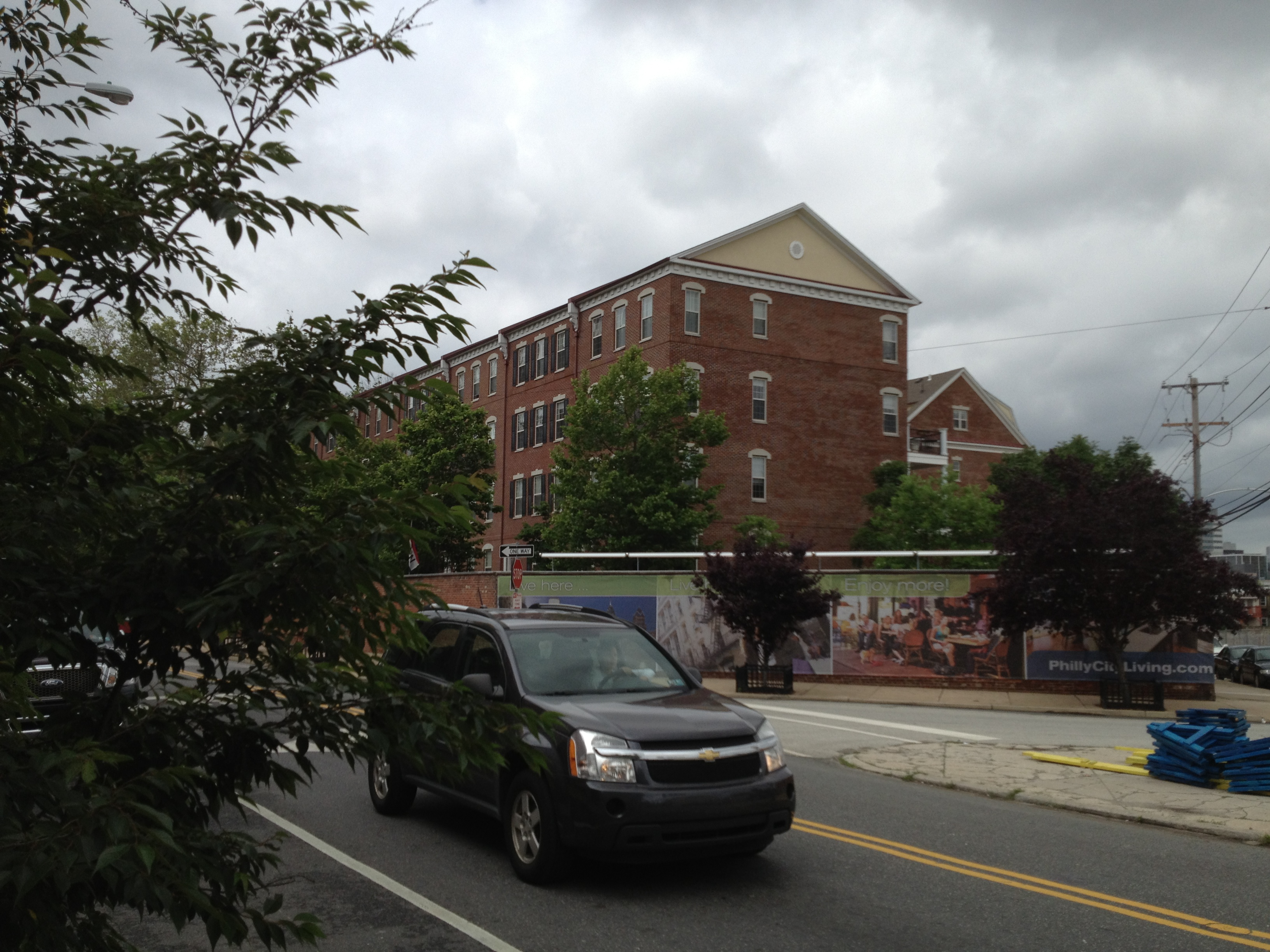
Bainbridge Street outside view of Naval Square gated community

A unique notable feature of Naval Square is that the neighborhood has a "suburban feel" inside the city, unlike other neighborhoods in the city. According to the source, one resident chose the neighborhood because he wanted a home "near bars, but not in them."

The New York Times states that Naval Square is part of a trend of the city's gentrification, driven by new tax abatement policies. The boundaries of the neighborhood are set by the surrounding brick wall on Grays Ferry Avenue to the east, Bainbridge Street to the north, Schuylkill Avenue to the west, and Christian Street to the south. The Children's Hospital of Philadelphia will be building three new 26-story towers next door to this community in the Schuylkill neighborhood, just outside the gated community, by 2017.

== History ==
- U.S. Naval Home
- U.S. National Register of Historic Places
- U.S. National Historic Landmark
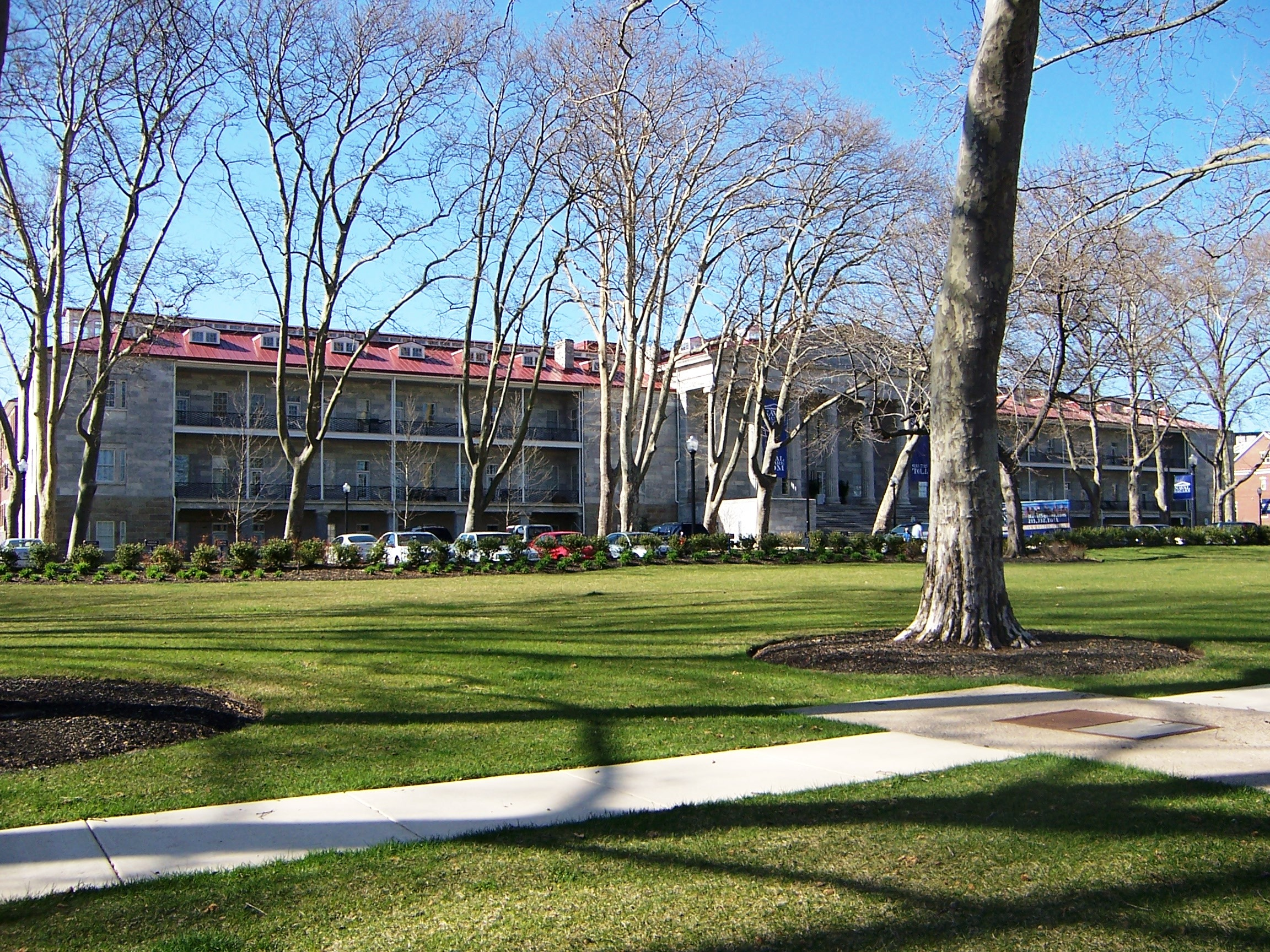
- Naval Asylum Building
- Location: Gray's Ferry Ave. at 24th St. Philadelphia, Pennsylvania
- Coordinates: 39°56′38″N 75°11′2″W
- Built: 1827
- Architect: William Strickland
- Architectural style: Greek Revival
- NRHP reference No.: 72001173
- Added to NRHP: August 21, 1972

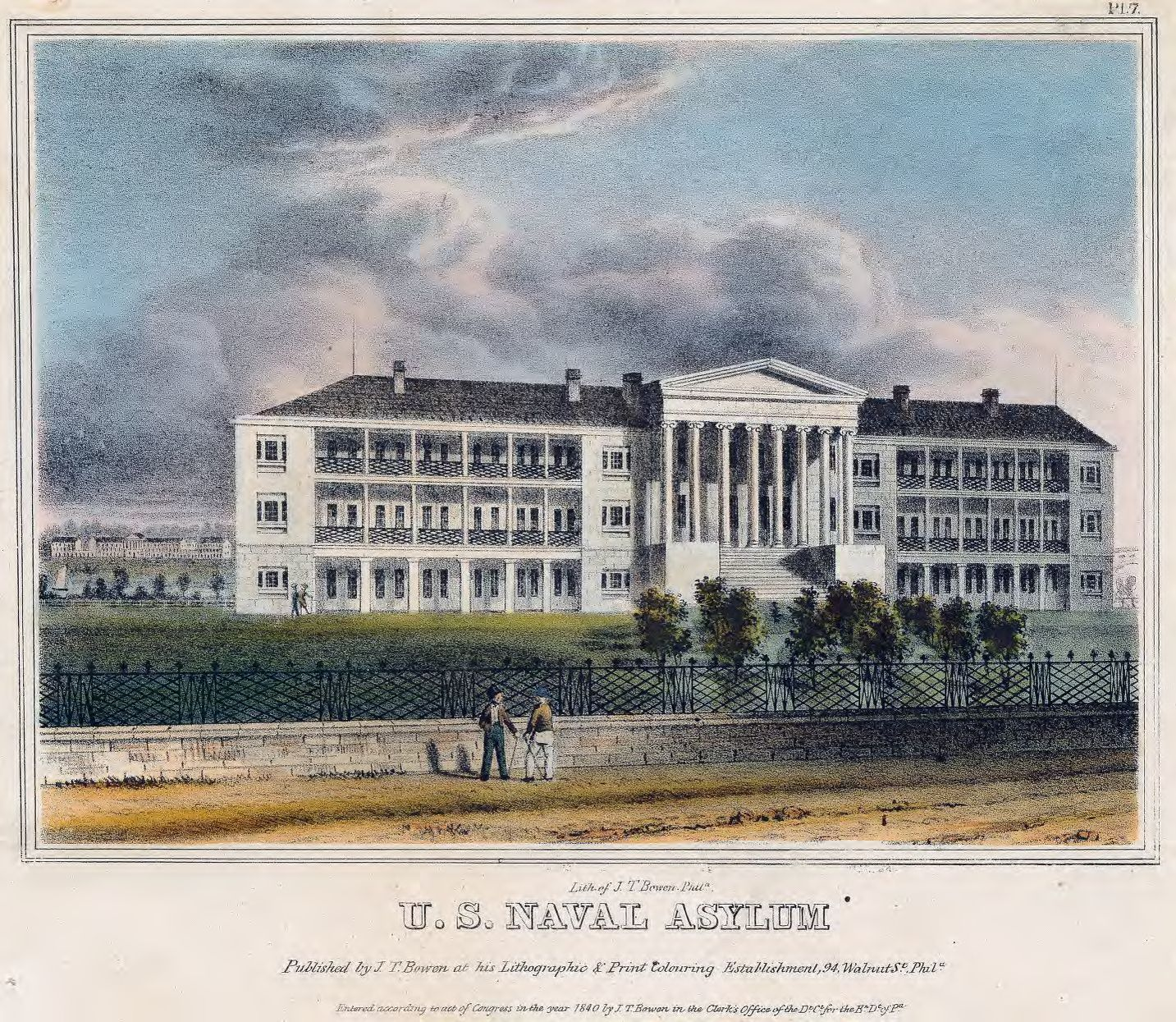
U S Naval Asylum 1838, John Caspar Wild,

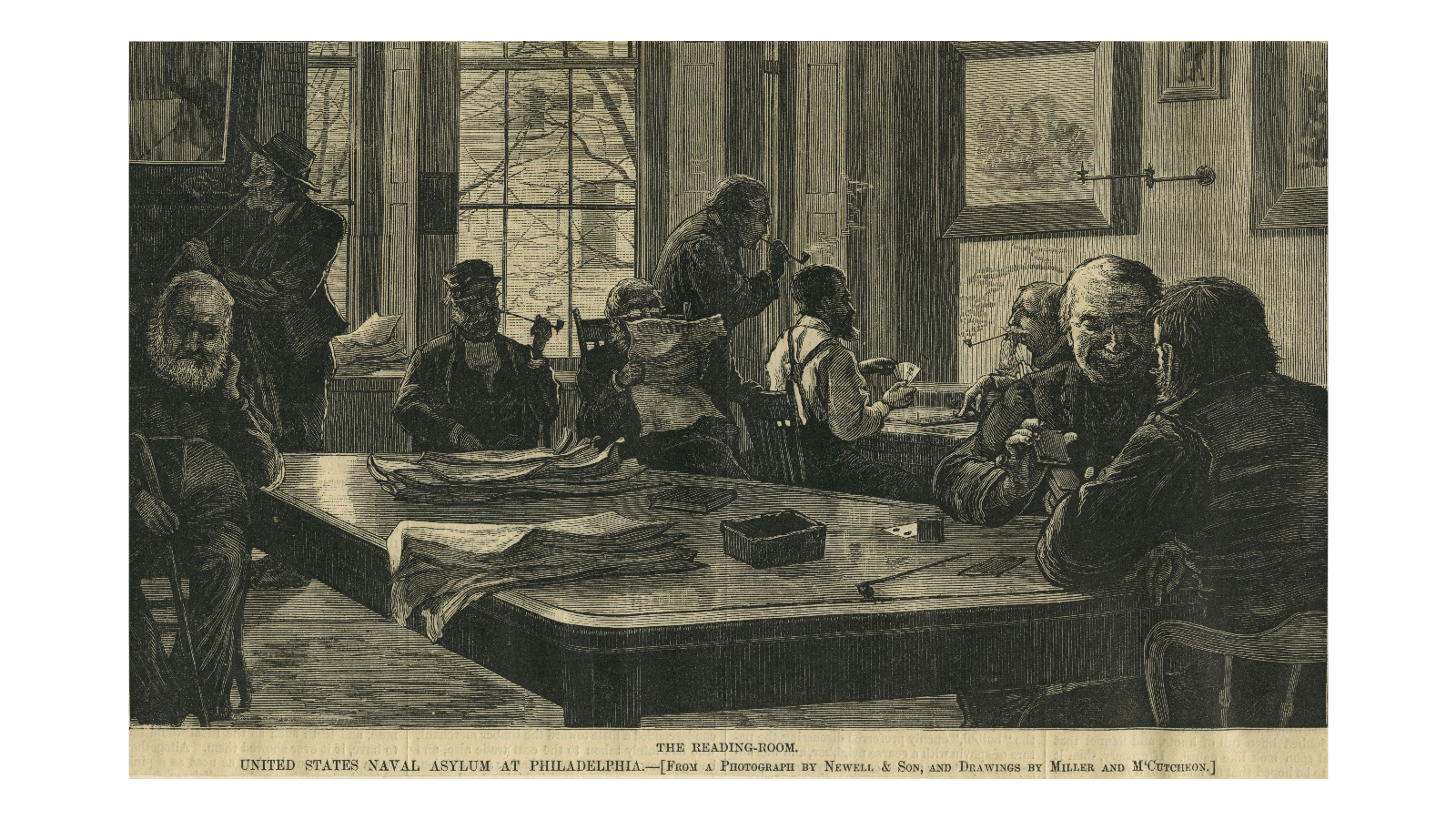
The Reading- Room, U.S.Naval Asylum,1878

For seven years, from 1838 until 1845, the campus housed the Philadelphia Naval School, a precursor to the United States Naval Academy. Beginning in 1838, midshipmen approaching examinations for promotion were assigned to the school for eight months of study. In 1842, William Chauvenet was placed in charge of the school and formalized much of the study. When the Naval Academy was formed in 1845, four of the seven faculty members came from the Philadelphia school.

On July 1, 1889, its name was changed to Naval Home. In 1976, the Naval Home was moved to Gulfport, Mississippi, after it was determined that the Philadelphia facility could not be economically expanded and modernized. The historic section of the neighborhood was placed on the National Register of Historic Places and was designated a National Historic Landmark in 1971.

In 1988, the property was sold to residential developer Toll Brothers. The main building was damaged by arsonists in 2003. It has since been restored as luxury condominiums. In 2004, Toll Brothers began the first phase of development, with 345 condominiums. In 2009, the firm sold 220 condos and 74 townhomes.

== See also ==
- Schuylkill Arsenal
- List of National Historic Landmarks in Philadelphia
- National Register of Historic Places listings in South Philadelphia
