= Joseph Anschutz =

American architect

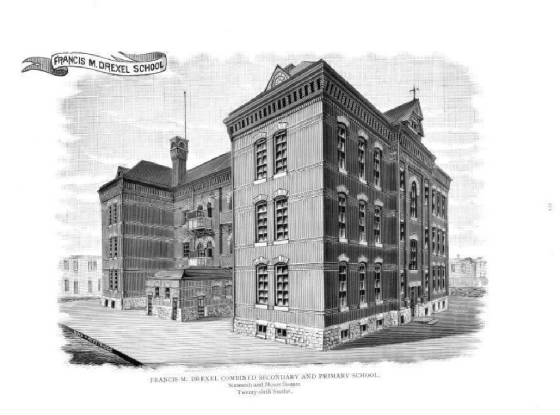
Francis M. Drexel School

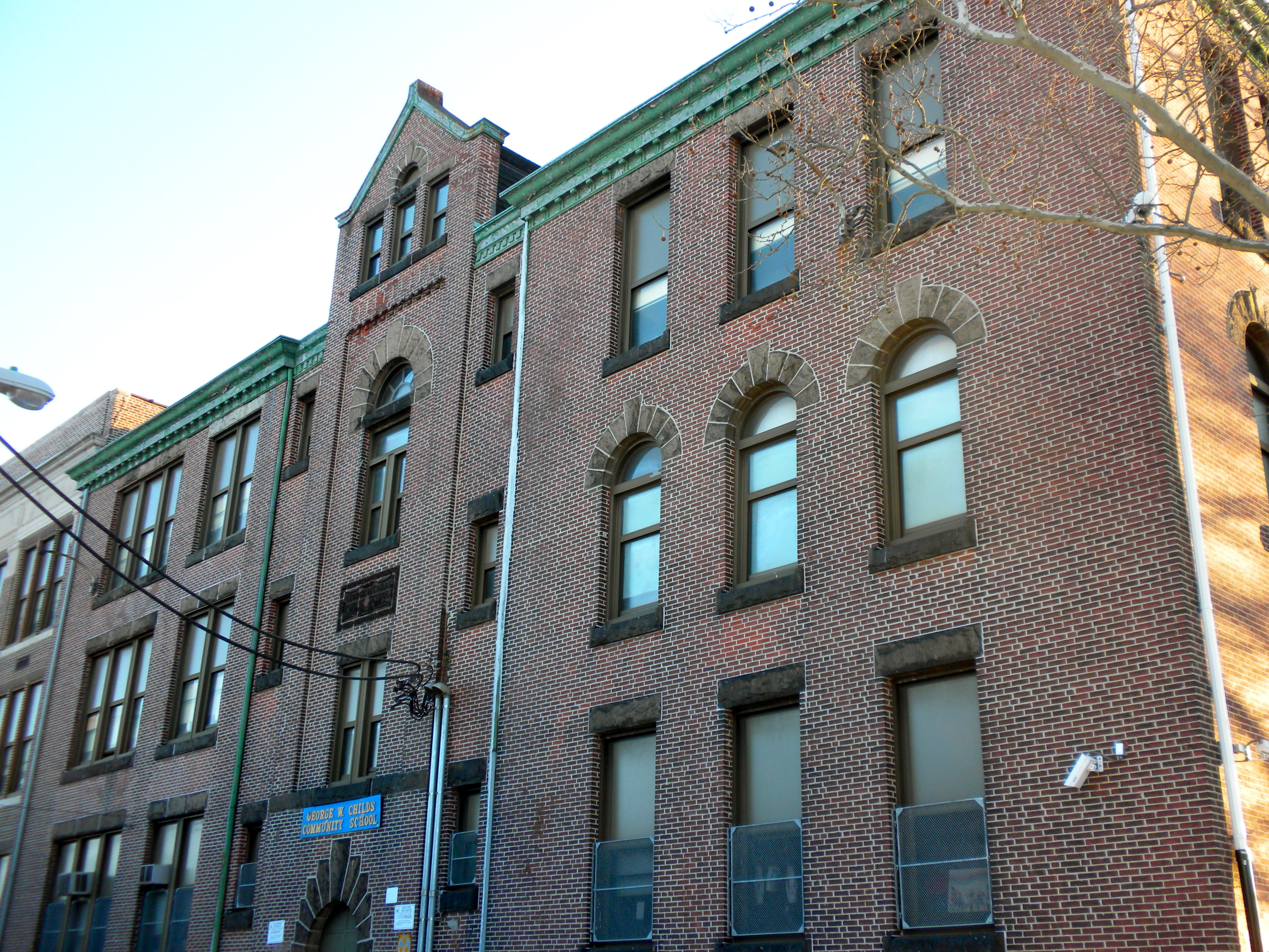
George W. Childs School

Joseph Anschutz, or Joseph Anshutz, was an American architect who designed schools in the Philadelphia, Pennsylvania area.

He designed approximately 75 schools, some nearly identical.

Works designed or co-designed by Anschutz that have been listed on the U.S. National Register of Historic Places include:

listed as Joseph Anschutz or Joseph W. Anschutz

- George W. Childs School, 1501 S. 17th St., Philadelphia PA
- Watson Comly School, 13250 Trevose Rd., Philadelphia PA
- Francis M. Drexel School, 1800 S. Sixteenth St., Philadelphia PA
- William Levering School, 5938 Ridge Ave., Philadelphia PA
- James Martin School, 3340 Richmond St., Philadelphia PA
- Philip H. Sheridan School, 800–818 E. Ontario St., Philadelphia PA

listed as Joseph W. Anshutz or J.W. Anshutz or Joseph Anshutz

- Germantown Grammar School (Boundary Increase), 45 W. Haines St., Philadelphia PA
- Francis Scott Key School, 2226–2250 S. Eighth St., Philadelphia PA
- David Landreth School, 1201 S. Twenty-third St., Philadelphia PA

The Landreth School has been redeveloped.

- Thomas Powers School, Frankford Ave. and Somerset St., Philadelphia PA

An early 20th-century article that uses the "Anshutz" spelling says he also co-designed Philadelphia's Central High School.

== See also ==
- Louis Anshutz, an architect who designed two NRHP-listed Philadelphia schools
