= Germantown Grammar School =

- U.S. National Register of Historic Places
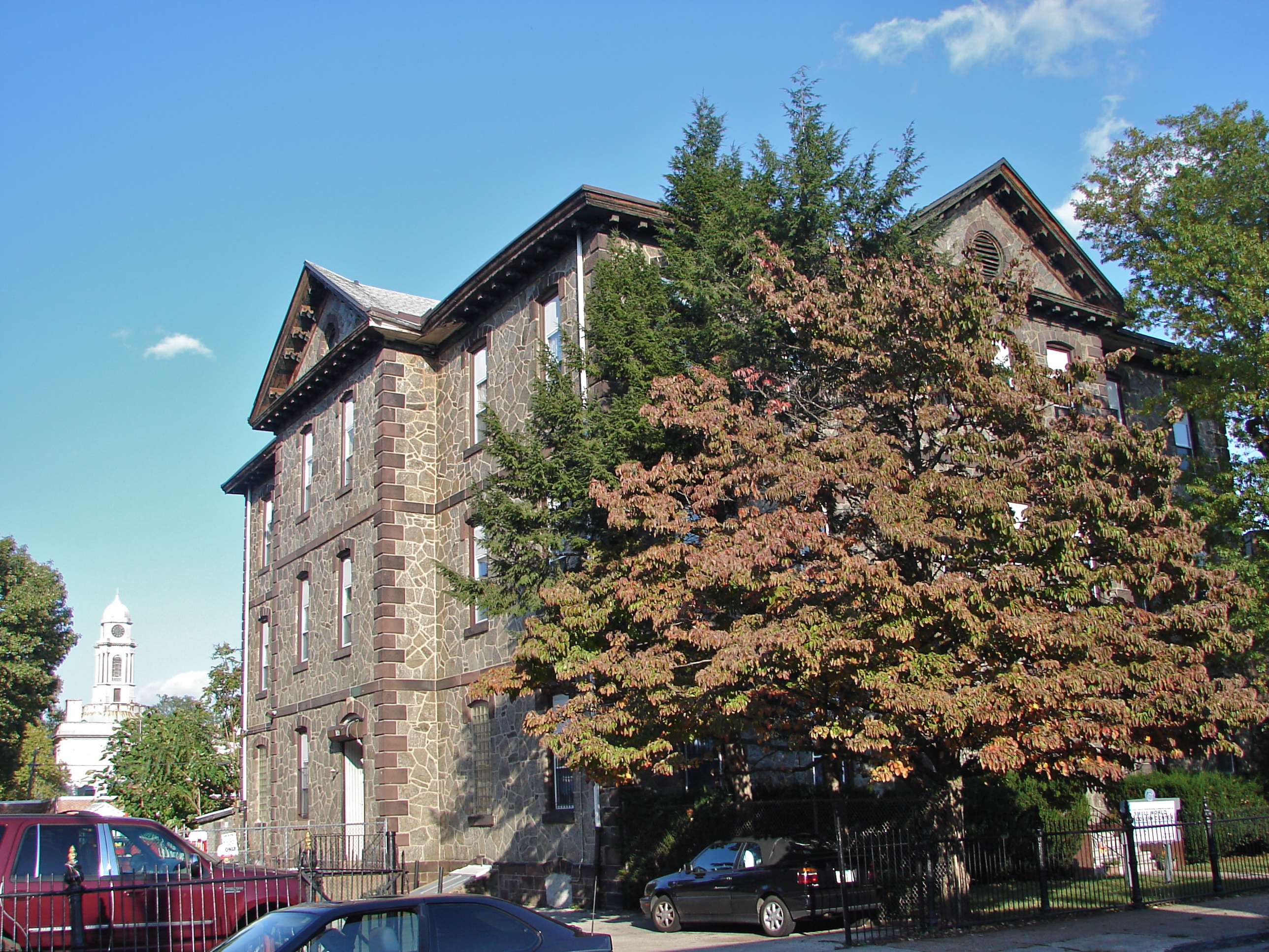
- Germantown Grammar School #1, October 2010

- Location within Philadelphia Location within Pennsylvania Location within the United States
- Location: 5933 McCallum St., Philadelphia, Pennsylvania
- Coordinates: 40°02′15″N 75°10′43″W
- Area: less than one acre
- Built: 1874–1875, 1886–1887
- Architect: Esler, Louis; Anshutz, Joseph W.
- Architectural style: Italianate
- MPS: Philadelphia Public Schools TR
- NRHP reference No.: 86003287, 06000430 (boundary increase)
- Added to NRHP: December 1, 1986, May 19, 2006 (boundary increase)

Germantown Grammar School, also known as Lafayette Grammar School and Opportunities Industrial Center, Inc., are two historic school buildings located in the Germantown neighborhood of Philadelphia, Pennsylvania.

Germantown Grammar School No. 1 (originally known as "Germantown Combined Grammar, Secondary, and Primary School" and later as "Opportunities Industrial Center, Inc.") was added to the National Register of Historic Places in 1986. Germantown Grammar School No. 2 was then added in 2006, following the approval of a boundary increase request for this same register listing, which was submitted in January of that same year.

== History ==
=== Germantown Grammar School No. 1 ===
Germantown Grammar School No. 1 (Opportunities Industrial Center, Inc.) was built in 1874 at 5933-51 McCallum Street in Philadelphia. Originally known as the "Germantown Combined Grammar, Secondary, and Primary School," it was designed by Louis H. Esler, the first architect to be appointed as Building Supervisor by Philadelphia's school district, and is a three-story, serpentine brownstone building in a combined Italianate / Gothic-style. During the mid-1880s, as the school's popularity grew, Philadelphia school leaders determined that more space was needed. As a result, they erected a new annex nearby at 45 West Haines Street, named it "Germantown Grammar School No. 2," and renamed the original school building as "Germantown Grammar School No. 1." The building principal at this time was James Monroe Willard.

For the calendar year ending December 31, 1893, the Board of Public Education reported that the school continued to be led by building principal J. Monroe Willard, that the student body was entirely male, and that the school had begun the year with 816 boys in attendance, averaged 850 boys in attendance throughout the year, and ended with a total of 867 boys enrolled. In addition, the report listed the faculty as: Margaret D. Bockins, S. H Bryan [Sarah H. Bryan], Isabella F. Clark, Elizabeth C. Friedman, Sarah A. Hodson, Helena T. Law, Margaret J. McCoy, E. T. Menough, Minnie M. Metzler, Sue C. Schrack, Kate R. Sorber, Kate W. Stevens, Frances C. Swift, Mary S. Swift, Mary Unger, Emma L. Varwig, and Mary L. Willcox. The janitor was William Logan.

For the calendar year ending December 31, 1895, the Board of Public Education reported that J. Monroe Willard was still the supervising principal, that the student population was still entirely male, and that the school had begun the year with 865 boys in attendance, averaged 897 boys in attendance throughout the year, and ended with a total of 918 boys enrolled. In addition, the report noted that the faculty remained largely unchanged, and included: Margaret D. Bockius, Sarah H. Bryan, Isabella F. Clark, Elsie J. deKraft, Sadie S. Elderton, Elizabeth C. Friedman, Sarah A. Hodson, Helena T. Law, E. F. Menough, Minnie M. Metzler, A. S. Righter, Sue C. Schrack, Edith Scott, Harriet L. Smith, Kate R. Sorber, Kate W. Stevens, Frances C. Swift, Mary C. Swift, Mary Unger, Emma L. Varwig, and Mary L. Willcox. William Logan was also still employed as the janitor.

In June 1896, The Philadelphia Inquirer reported that as "supervising principal of the Germantown Combined Grammar, Secondary and Primary School and president of its Educational Club," J. Monroe Willard had ensured that "forty to sixty teachers were in attendance on the University Extension courses in Germantown during the past season."

By 1900, the supervising principal was William H. Arnhold. Still in charge two years later, Arnhold's student body was still all male, averaging 761 for the year and ending with 777 enrolled. That year's faculty were: J. E. Burnett Buckenham, Sadie S. Elderton, Elizabeth C. Freedman [Friedman], Laura M. Haines, Sarah A. Hodson, Helena T. Law, Mary K. Montgomery, Mary E. Platt, Sue C. Schrack, Edith Scott, Kate R. Sorber, Blanche Stevens, W. Wesley Stevenson, Frances Swift, Mary S. Swift, and Mary L. Willcox. William Logan also continued in his role as janitor.

By 1906, the student body of the combined grammar and primary school was still all male, but the school was now also beginning to admit girls via its co-educational kindergarten. Still led by supervising William H. Arnhold, the increasingly diversified faculty that year included: Mary H. Beatty, George C. Cochran, Sadie Elderton, Elizabeth C. Friedman, Laura M. Haines, Sarah H. Hodson, Helena T. Law, Lavinia Mayer, Mary K. Montgomery, Mary E. Platt, Sue C. Schrack, Kate R. Sorber, Blanche Stevens, Frances C. Swift, Mary S. Swift, Edmund A. Thompson, and Mary L. Wilcox. The school's janitors that year were Louis Greaser and Frederick W. Stock.

During the 1980s, a two-story addition was then tacked on to the original Germantown Grammar School structure; it features dressed brownstone trim; a projecting, pedimented front section; and projecting cross-gables.

=== Germantown Grammar School No. 2 ===
In response to the successful operation of the Germantown Combined Grammar, Secondary, and Primary School, leaders of Philadelphia's school system elected to expand the school's operation by constructing a new annex to the original building. Known as Germantown Grammar School No. 2, this new annex cost roughly $20,000, and was designed by architect Joseph W. Anshutz. Erected at 45 West Haines Street in Philadelphia between 1886 and 1887, the contractor was W. H. Brunner. A two-story, four bay by nine bay, brick building faced in Wissahickon schist in a vernacular Italianate-style, it was designed to serve as an annex to the original Germantown Grammar School (Germantown Grammar School No. 1). Both the annex and the original grammar school were then managed by building principal James Monroe Willard.

Initially omitted from the 1986 nomination of public school buildings in Philadelphia for listing on the National Register of Historic Places ("Philadelphia Schools Thematic Resources") and that nomination process's 1988 addendum, Germantown Grammar School No. 2 was added to this register listing in 2006 after Dara Zitzman of Powers & Co., Inc. submitted a boundary increase nomination in January 2006.

=== Listing of these structures on the National Register of Historic Places ===
Germantown Grammar School No. 1 (Opportunities Industrial Center, Inc.) was added to the National Register of Historic Places in 1986. In January 2006, a boundary increase was sought to this NRHP in order to include Germantown Grammar School No. 2 as part of this same listing; this request was approved later that same year.
