= D. Newlin Fell School =

- U.S. National Register of Historic Places
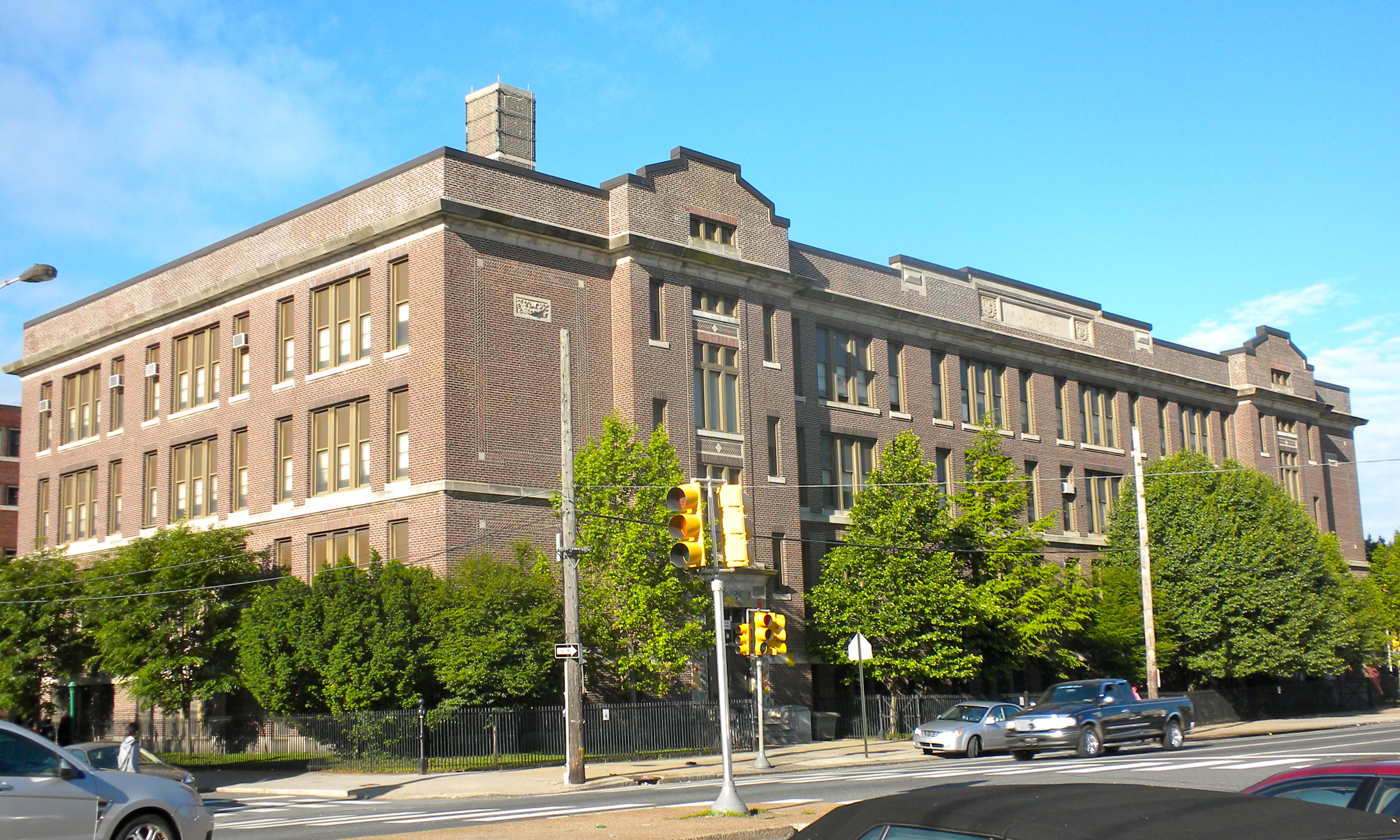
- D. Newlin Fell School, May 2010

- Location within Philadelphia Location within Pennsylvania Location within the United States
- Location: 900 Oregon W. Ave., Philadelphia, Pennsylvania
- Coordinates: 39.9155°N 75.1634°W
- Area: less than one acre
- Built: 1922-1924
- Architect: Irwin T. Catharine
- Architectural style: Colonial Revival
- MPS: Philadelphia Public Schools TR
- NRHP reference No.: 88002268
- Added to NRHP: November 18, 1988

D. Newlin Fell School is a public elementary school located in the East Oregon neighborhood of South Philadelphia. It is part of the School District of Philadelphia, and shares a site with the George C. Thomas Junior High School. It was named in honor of D. Newlin Fell, who served as a Justice of the Pennsylvania Supreme Court from 1894 to 1910 and Chief Justice until 1915.

The historic building was designed by Irwin T. Catharine and built in 1922–1924. It is a three-story, eight-bay, brick building on a raised basement in the Colonial Revival-style. It features two projecting entrances with stone surrounds and a brick parapet.

It was added to the National Register of Historic Places in 1988.

Students zoned to Fell are zoned to South Philadelphia High School.
