= Philadelphia, Wilmington and Baltimore Railroad Freight Shed =

- U.S. National Register of Historic Places
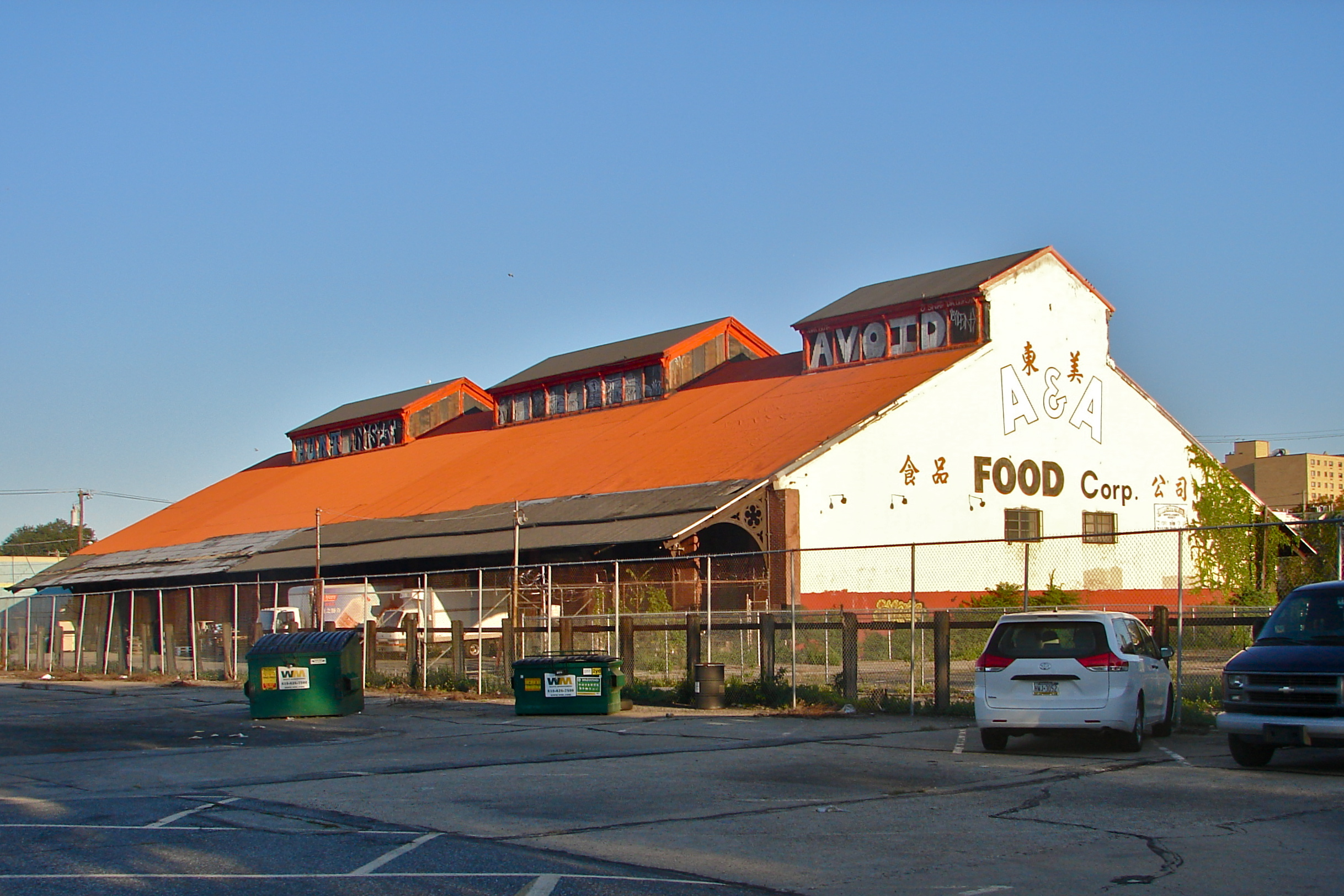
- Philadelphia, Wilmington and Baltimore Railroad Freight Shed, October 2011

- Location within Philadelphia Location within Pennsylvania Location within the United States
- Location: 1001 South 15th Street, Philadelphia, Pennsylvania
- Coordinates: 39°56′21″N 75°10′04″W
- Area: 1 acre (0.40 ha)
- Built: 1876
- Built by: Philadelphia, Wilmington and Baltimore Railroad
- Architect: Fuller, Sidney T.
- Architectural style: Late Gothic Revival
- NRHP reference No.: 11000649
- Added to NRHP: September 8, 2011

The Philadelphia, Wilmington and Baltimore Railroad Freight Shed is an historic freight station in the Southwest Center City neighborhood of Philadelphia, Pennsylvania, along Broad Street. It was added to the National Register of Historic Places in 2011 and is today part of the Lincoln Square mixed-use development.

== History and notable features ==
The site had long been used by the Philadelphia, Wilmington and Baltimore Railroad; in 1865, President Abraham Lincoln's funeral train made its first Philadelphia stop here.

In 1876, the railroad began construction on the shed, a large one-and-one-half-story brick and stone building in the Late Gothic Revival style. It measures 99 feet, 5 inches wide and 235 feet long. It has a long, sloping roof supported by a Fink truss system, with glazed monitors.

The shed was used for passenger trains for four years, but was used solely for freight operations after January 1882.

The passenger station, along Washington Avenue, was demolished by the federal government during World War II to make space to store Marine Corps munitions and vehicles awaiting transport. By the late 1960s, the shed was sold for use as a warehouse. The head house and eight eastern bays were demolished a few years later.

In 2011, the shed was added to the National Register of Historic Places.

In 2016, developer Alterra Property Group began work on Lincoln Square, a $100 million mixed-use development on the site. The shed was rehabilitated and an eastern entrance added to create a space for a Sprouts supermarket. Designed by Philadelphia architectural firm Kelly Maiello, the project received several awards for preservation and adaptive reuse.
