= Alternative Middle Years at James Martin School =

- James Martin School
- U.S. National Register of Historic Places
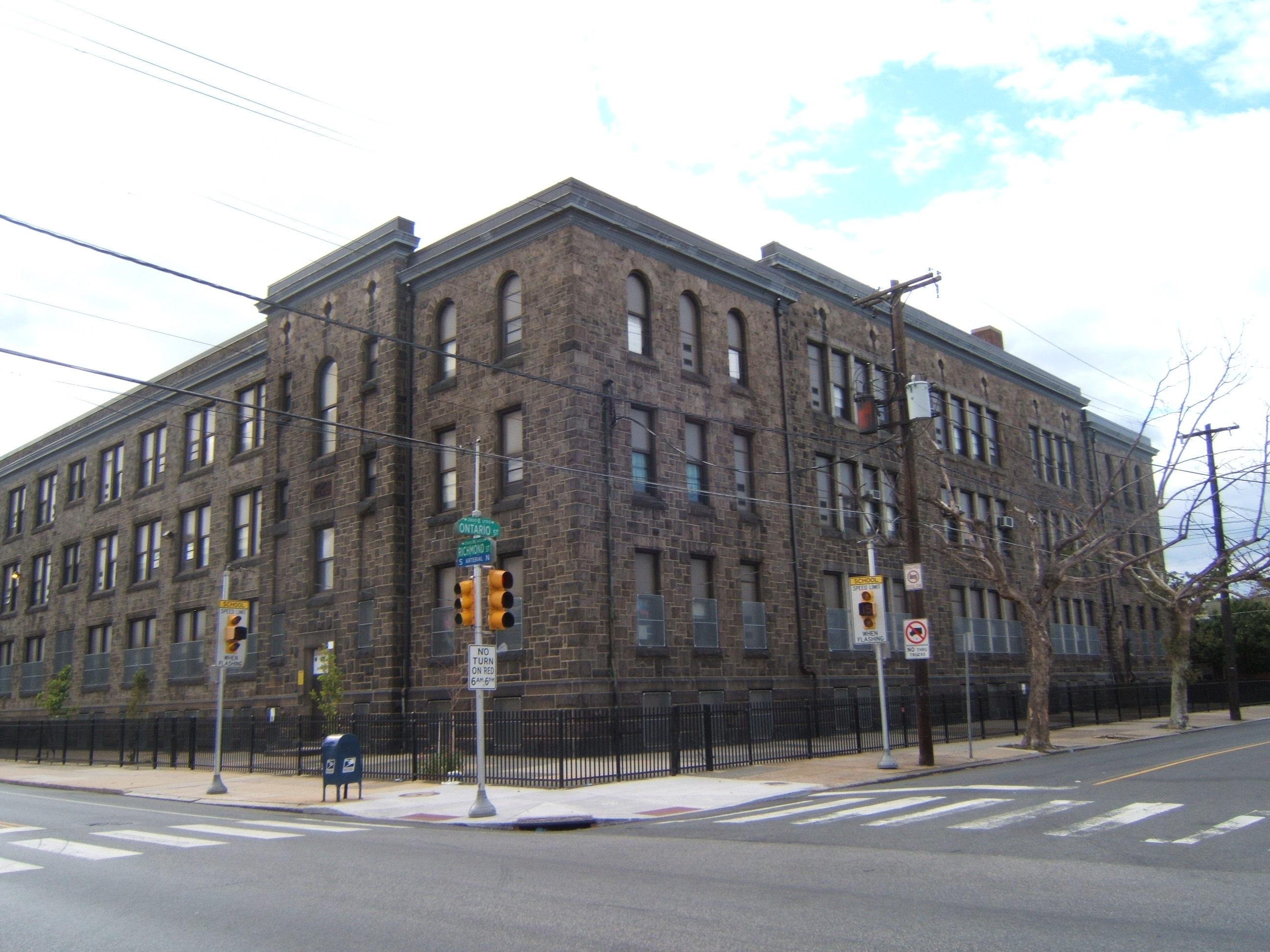
- James Martin School, September 2010

- Location within Philadelphia Location within Pennsylvania Location within the United States
- Location: 3380 Richmond St., Philadelphia, Pennsylvania
- Coordinates: 39°59′08″N 75°05′50″W
- Area: 1.4 acres (0.57 ha)
- Built: 1894–1896, 1922
- Architect: Joseph W. Anschutz
- Architectural style: Romanesque
- MPS: Philadelphia Public Schools TR
- NRHP reference No.: 88002299
- Added to NRHP: November 18, 1988

The Alternative Middle Years at James Martin School is a historic, American middle school that is located in the Fishtown neighborhood of Philadelphia, Pennsylvania.

Part of the School District of Philadelphia, it was added to the National Register of Historic Places in 1988.

== History and architectural features ==
This historic building was built between 1894 and 1896, and was expanded in 1922. It is a three-story, five-bay, stone building that sits on a raised basement. Designed in the Romanesque style, it features portholes above the central three bays.
