= Francis M. Drexel School =

- U.S. National Register of Historic Places
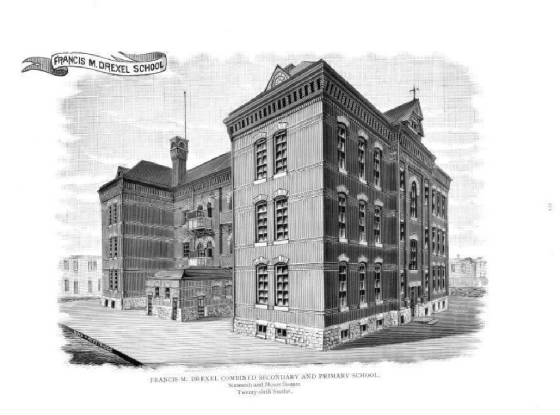
- Exterior of the Drexel School in 1897

- Location within Philadelphia Location within Pennsylvania Location within the United States
- Location: 1800 S. 16th Street, Philadelphia, Pennsylvania
- Coordinates: 39°55′42″N 75°10′21″W
- Area: 1 acre (0.40 ha)
- Built: 1888
- Architect: Joseph Anschutz; Charles O'Neill, Jr.
- Architectural style: Late Victorian
- MPS: Philadelphia Public Schools TR
- NRHP reference No.: 86003272
- Added to NRHP: December 4, 1986

The Francis M. Drexel School was a historic school in Philadelphia, Pennsylvania, United States. Located along S. 16th Street, the school was designed by Joseph Anschutz and built under the direction of Charles O'Neill, Jr. The three-story brick building was built in a regular rectangular plan in the Victorian style of architecture, with three chimneys dominating its facade.

The school was named for Francis Martin Drexel, whose son, banker and philanthropist Anthony J. Drexel, founded Drexel University two years after the construction of the school.

== The school ==
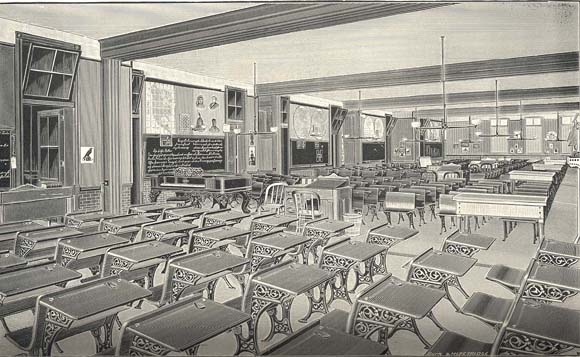
Interior of the school in 1897. Gaslights hang down from the ceiling, and the moveable classroom walls have been folded and stored.

At the time of the Drexel School's construction, Philadelphia's school system had a decentralized administration, with Drexel being a part of the Twenty-sixth Section. The school buildings, however, were designed by the central administration.

The Drexel family was intensely involved with education at this time. Anthony J. Drexel, as the partner of J.P. Morgan, was an internationally important financier, and as the partner of George W. Childs, publisher of the Philadelphia Public Ledger, was influential in local affairs as well. He was a close friend of Childs, and together they worked to offer free or inexpensive education to the working class. According to Childs, Drexel gave "many munificent gifts to established educational and charitable institutions," as well as founding and endowing the Drexel Institute, which later became Drexel University. Drexel's orphaned niece, Katherine Drexel, sought advice from Childs and Drexel on her plans to become a nun in the service of educating Native Americans and African-Americans. This work led to her beatification by Pope John II. Two other nieces, Elizabeth Drexel Smith and Louise Drexel Morrell, founded and endowed the St. Francis Industrial School at Eddington, Pennsylvania in 1888. The George W. Childs School, also designed by Anschutz, was built in 1894 just three blocks north of the Francis M. Drexel School.

Completed in 1889, the Drexel School included features common to late nineteenth-century Philadelphia schools. Earlier schools were generally built entirely of brick, and the 1870s saw the introduction of stone schools, but schools built between 1883 and 1900, including Drexel, typically combined brick walls and brownstone finishing.

Anschutz worked in the tradition of Samuel Sloan's "Philadelphia Plan" of school architecture: On each floor, classrooms opened onto a single corridor, and were divided by moveable partitions. Coatrooms were provided in each classroom. Stairways and other non-classroom space were located at the end of the corridor, near the outside of the building. The architectural plans closely follow these principles. The school's windows were enlarged in 1914, and in 1922, lighting was changed from gas to electric.

Although it originally housed classes for both elementary and secondary students, Drexel was built at a time when school boards were beginning to open separate schools for different purposes. It remained in use by the Philadelphia Public Schools into the late twentieth century.

== Recognition and demolition ==
In 1986, the Francis Drexel School was listed on the National Register of Historic Places in recognition of its architectural significance. While many Philadelphia schools had been modeled on the Drexel School in the late nineteenth century, most had been destroyed or significantly remodeled; only Drexel and two other schools remained in a condition similar to that of their original construction. Fifty-two other Philadelphia schools, including five designed by Anschutz, were added to the Register on the same day as part of the Philadelphia Public Schools multiple property submission.

The Drexel School was demolished in February, 2010.

== Gallery ==
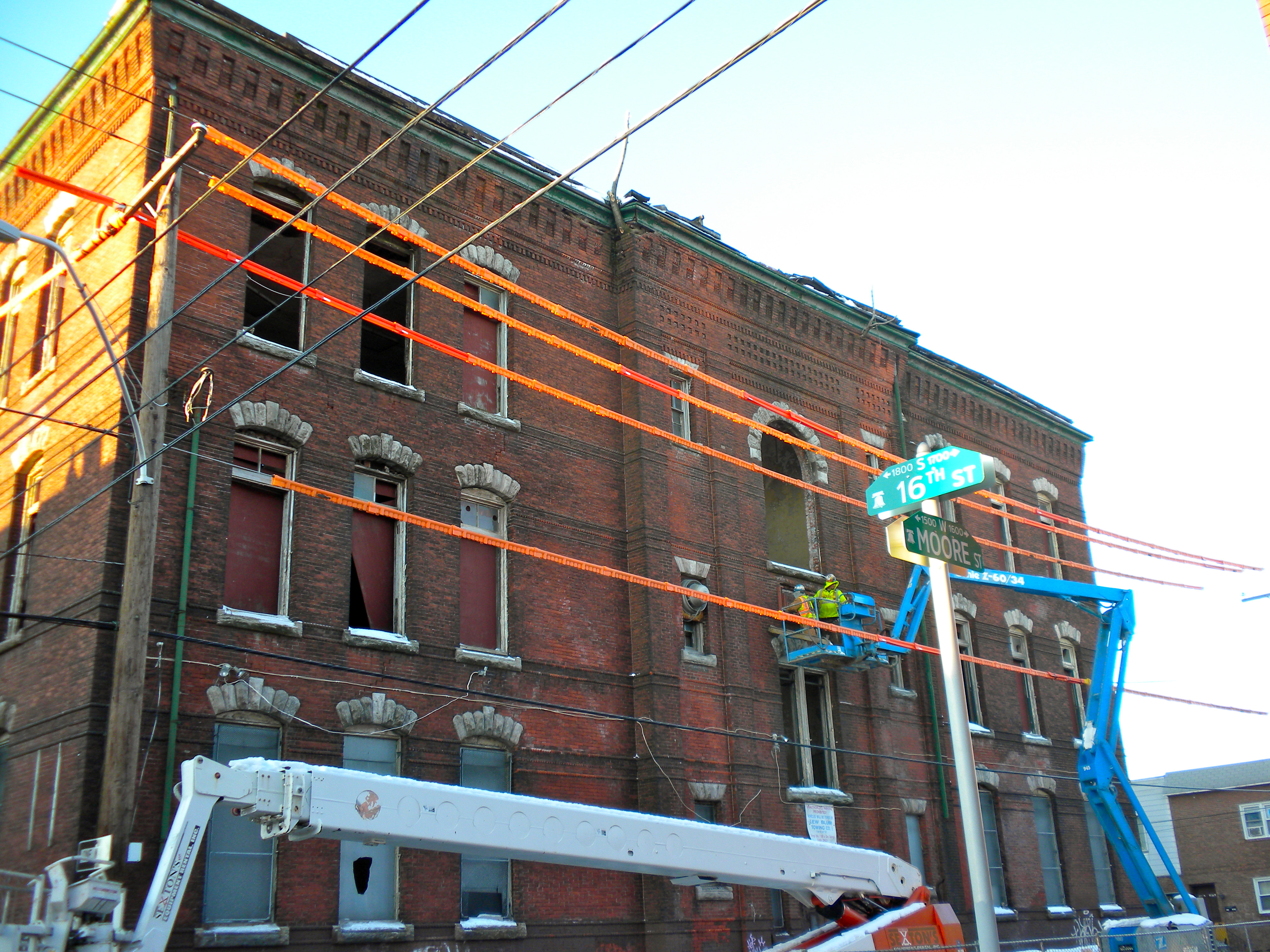
Crews preparing to demolish the school

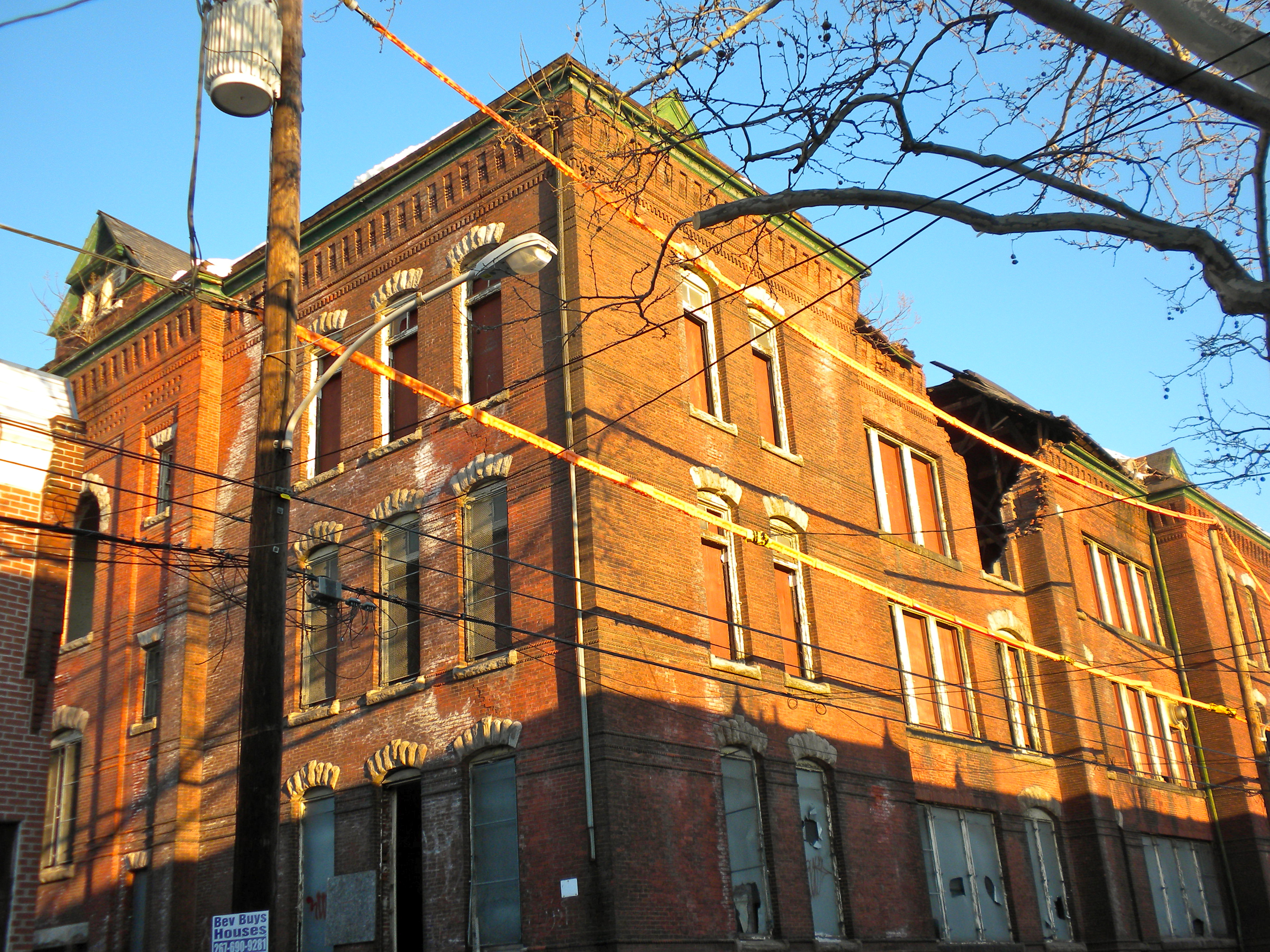
Exterior of the school as demolition begins
