= St. Anthony de Padua Parish School =

- U.S. National Register of Historic Places
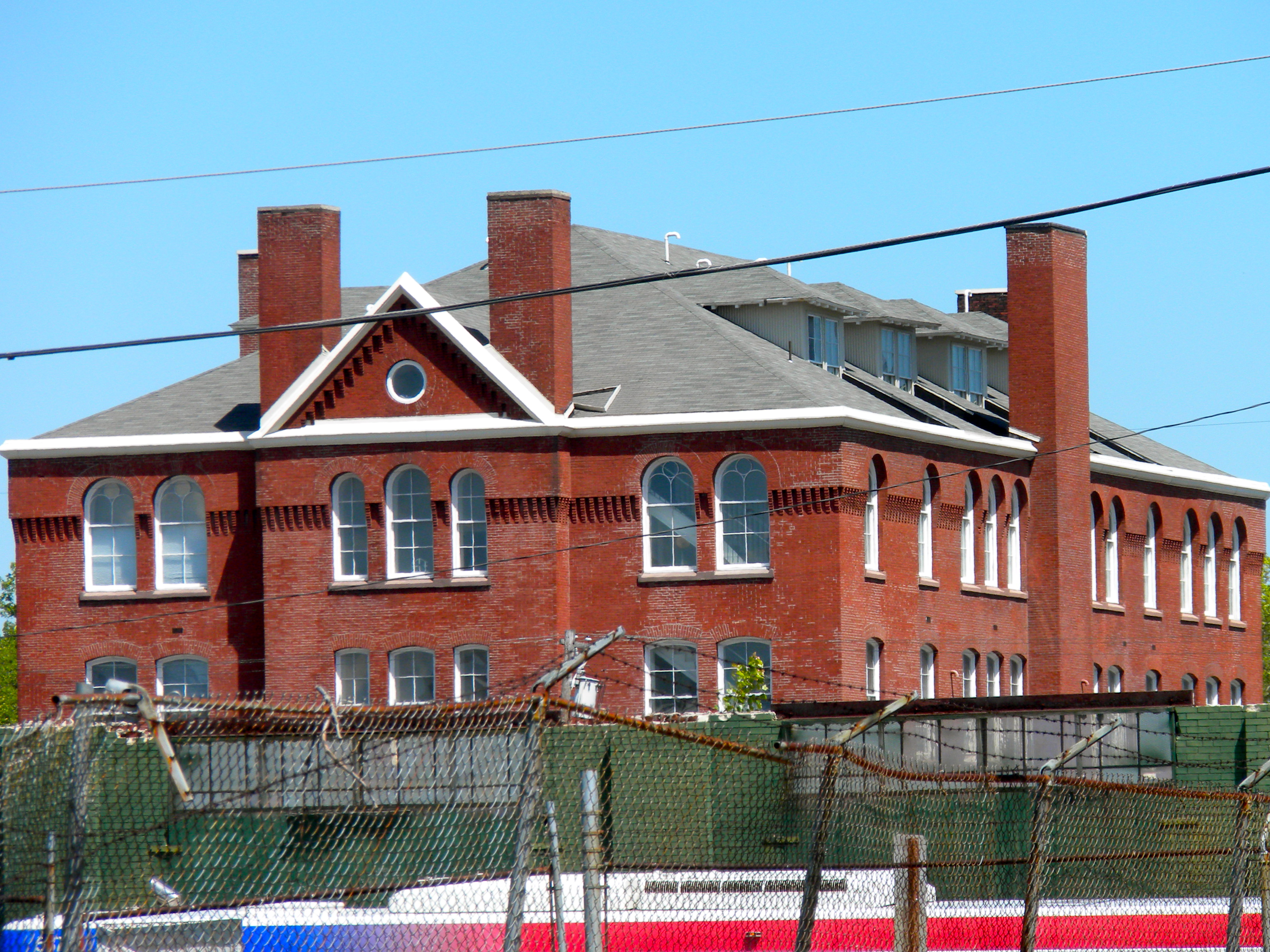
- St. Anthony de Padua Parish School, May 2010

- Location within Philadelphia Location within Pennsylvania Location within the United States
- Location: 2309 Carpenter St., Philadelphia, Pennsylvania
- Coordinates: 39.9412°N 75.1821°W
- Area: 0.5 acres (0.20 ha)
- Built: 1897
- Architect: Frank R. Watson
- Architectural style: Romanesque
- NRHP reference No.: 92000400
- Added to NRHP: May 7, 1992

St. Anthony de Padua Parish School is a historic Catholic school building located in the Southwest Center City neighborhood of Philadelphia, Pennsylvania. It was built in 1897, and is a four-story, red brick building with stone trim in the Romanesque Revival-style. It has rounded arched window openings, a hipped roof with dormer, and freestanding brick fire tower.

It was added to the National Register of Historic Places in 1992. It is currently used as senior housing.
