= Marine Corps Depot of Supplies, Schuylkill Warehouse =

- U.S. National Register of Historic Places
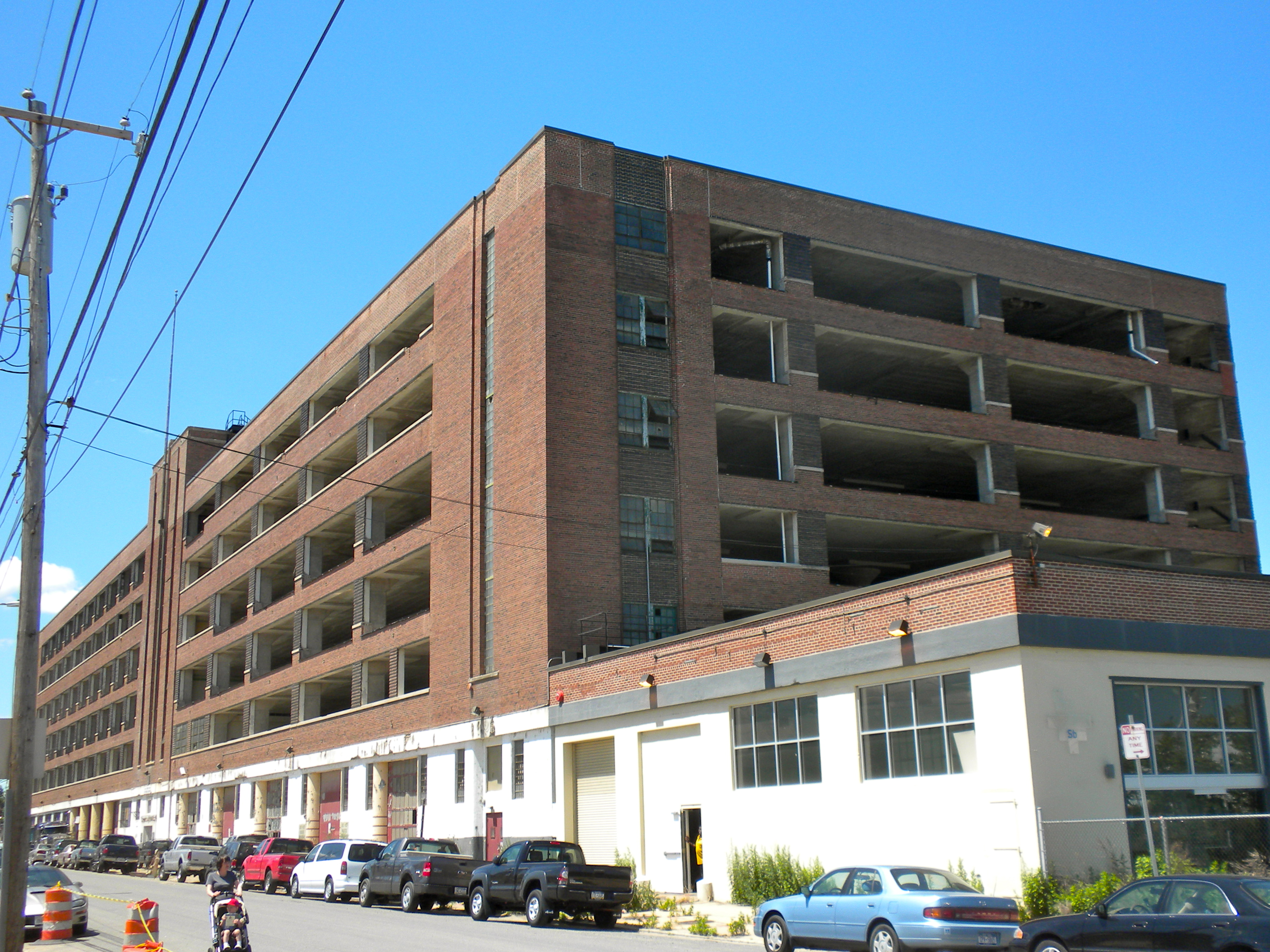
- Marine Corps Depot of Supplies, Schuylkill Warehouse, May 2010

- Location within Philadelphia Location within Pennsylvania Location within the United States
- Location: 700-734 Schuylkill Ave., Philadelphia, Pennsylvania
- Coordinates: 39°56′42″N 75°11′14″W
- Area: 5 acres (2.0 ha)
- Built: 1941, 1943, 1970
- Architect: Stopper, Eugene A.
- Architectural style: Moderne
- NRHP reference No.: 04001228
- Added to NRHP: November 12, 2004

The Marine Corps Depot of Supplies, Schuylkill Warehouse was an historic warehouse that was located in the Schuylkill neighborhood of Philadelphia, Pennsylvania, United States. The structure was demolished in 2015 to make way for the Children's Hospital of Philadelphia expansion.

It was added to the National Register of Historic Places in 2004.

== History and architectural features ==
Built by the United States Marine Corps in two sections in 1941 and in 1943, this historic structure was a six-story, orange brick building that was designed in the Moderne style. A one-story, brick addition was built circa 1970. The warehouse has an off-center tower over the entrance, unornamented parapet and flat roof, long bands of steel windows, and wide loading bays separated by rounded concrete columns. Occupied by the U.S. Marine Corps into the 1960s, it was subsequently used as a vocational training facility, the John F. Kennedy Vocational Center, by the School District of Philadelphia into the 1980s, and then used for administrative offices and storage.
