= Mastery Charter School Thomas Campus =

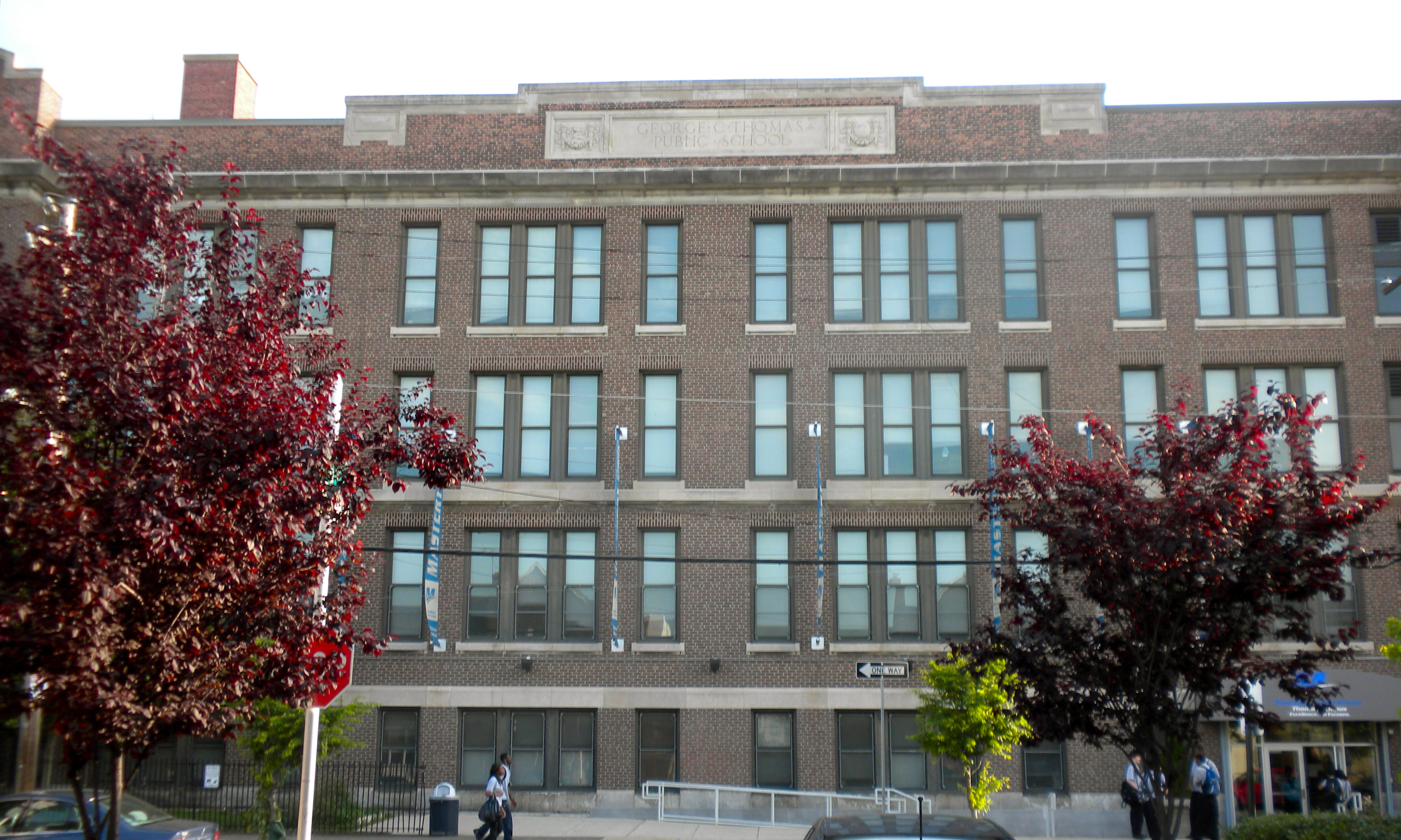
- Thomas Junior High School from Johnston Street

Location
- 927 Johnston Street; Philadelphia, Pennsylvania 19148; 39°54′53″N 75°09′49″W

Information
- Type: Charter school
- Authority: Mastery Charter Schools
- Grades: 7–12
- Campus: urban
- Colors: Navy Blue and Gray
- Mascot: Bulldogs
- Website: masterycharter.org/secondary-schools/thomas-campus
- George C. Thomas Junior High School
- U.S. National Register of Historic Places
- Area: 1 acre (0.40 ha)
- Built: 1920–1921
- Architect: Irwin T. Catharine
- Architectural style: Colonial Revival
- MPS: Philadelphia Public Schools TR
- NRHP reference No.: 88002330
- Added to NRHP: November 18, 1988

Mastery Charter School Thomas Campus, formerly the George C. Thomas Junior High School, is a secondary charter school located in the south section of Philadelphia, Pennsylvania. It is run by Mastery Charter Schools. It is located at the intersection of 9th and Johnston Streets just north of the South Philadelphia Sports Complex. Nearby are the residential neighborhoods of Marconi Plaza, Lower Moyamensing, and Packer Park; the recreational parkland of FDR Park; and the historical and new business-development center of the Philadelphia Naval Shipyard. The school is located within the boundaries of the Sports Complex Special Services District, directly on the Oregon Avenue urban corridor of small shops and restaurants anchored by larger shopping plazas on the east and west end of Oregon Avenue, and near the revitalized commercial area of Passyunk Avenue. It shares a site with the D. Newlin Fell School.

The school serves portions of South Philadelphia programmed for grades 7 through 12. It was previously part of the School District of Philadelphia. In 2009, a charter school college-bound curriculum was established at George C. Thomas, and the interior building was renovated, along with the main entrance on the south side, facing Johnston Street.

== History ==
The building was designed by Irwin T. Catharine and built in 1920–1921. It is a three-story, 8x3 bay, brick building on a raised basement in the Colonial Revival-style. An addition was built in 1952. It features two projecting entrances with stone surrounds and a brick parapet.

The school was named for George Clifford Thomas, a notable person in mid-19th century America. He was a prominent banker; Protestant church and civic leader; philanthropist; and collector of art, rare books and manuscripts.

He was a banking-house partner of Jay Cooke and Company in 1861, where he took a prominent part in the work accomplished by the firm, which strengthened the finances of the government so that it was enabled to carry on the Civil War. Later he partnered at the financial firm of Drexel & Co. For 13 years he was treasurer of the Domestic and Foreign Missionary Society of the Protestant Episcopal Church, and for 21 years he was deputy to General Conventions. He was elected accounting warden of the Holy Apostles and was superintendent of that Sunday school for 41 years.

In 1870 Mr. Thomas originated and organized the Sunday School Association of the Diocese of Pennsylvania, of which he was vice president from 1875 to the day of his death in 1909. Among his collection of art were works by Whistler, Delacroix, Millet, and Troyon.

The school was added to the National Register of Historic Places in 1988.

== Transportation ==
SEPTA serves the school with Routes 7, 23, 47, and G. Students living at least 1.5 miles (2.4 km) away are given a free SEPTA transit pass every week to get to school.

== Notable alumni ==
- James Darren (Class of 1952): Actor, singer, best known as love interest in Gidget movies
- Fabian (Class of 1960): Actor, singer, best known for song "Turn Me Loose"
- Eddie Fisher (Class of 1946): Singer, actor, ex-husband of Elizabeth Taylor and father of actress Carrie Fisher
- Gene Demby (Class of 1994): Journalist, reporter at NPR and host of the Code Switch podcast

== See also ==
- South Philadelphia
- List of schools of the School District of Philadelphia
