= Franklin Hose Company No. 28 =

- U.S. National Register of Historic Places
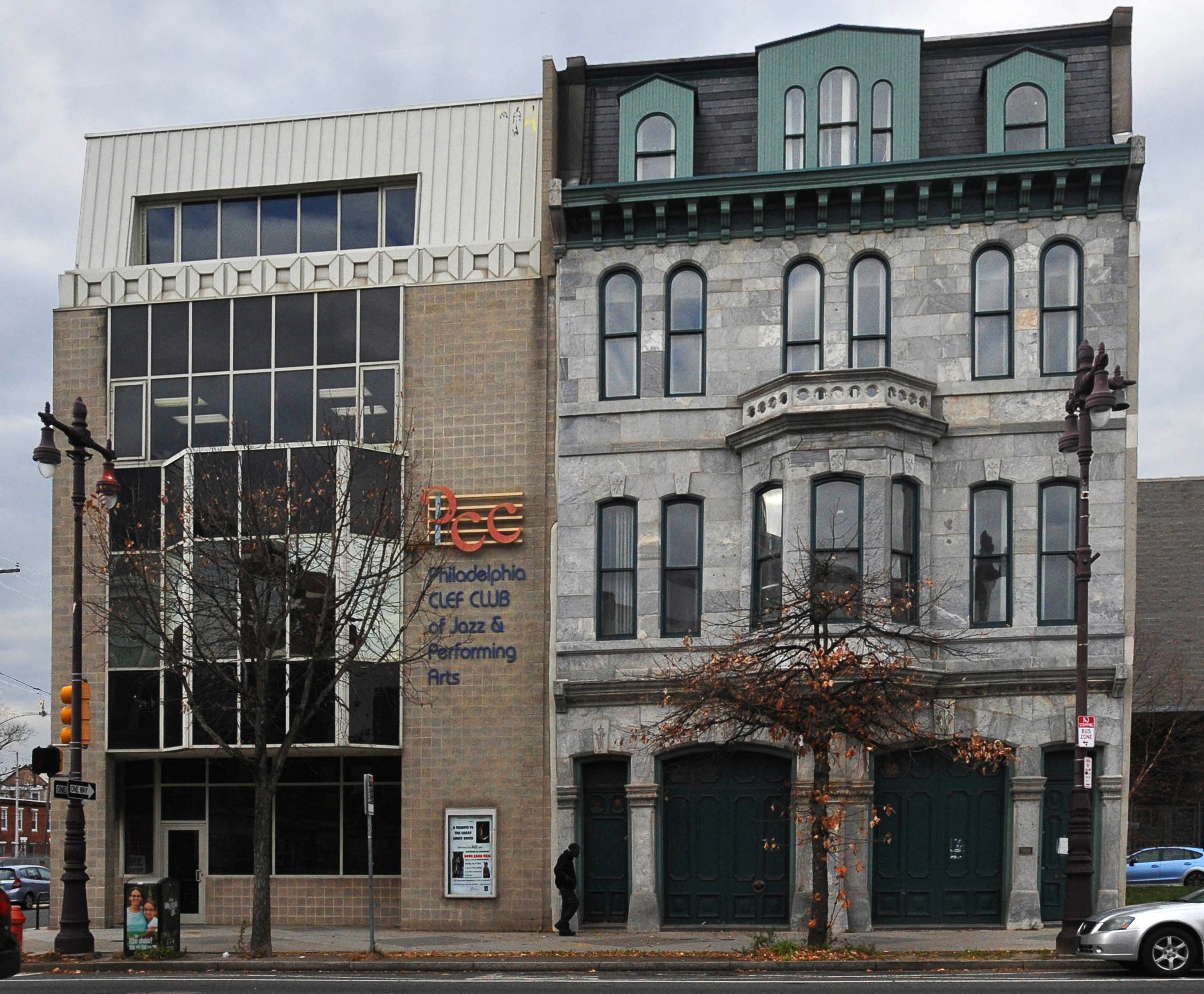
- Franklin Hose Company No. 28, November 2014

- Location within Philadelphia Location within Pennsylvania Location within the United States
- Location: 730–732 South Broad Street, Philadelphia, Pennsylvania
- Coordinates: 39°56′31″N 75°9′59″W
- Area: less than one acre
- Built: c. 1849, 1868–1869
- NRHP reference No.: 80003604
- Added to NRHP: December 3, 1980

Franklin Hose Company No. 28, also known as Harmony Engine Company No. 6, is a historic fire station located in the Southwest Center City neighborhood of Philadelphia, Pennsylvania. It was originally built about 1849, and considerably altered with a new front in 1868–1869. It is a four-story, three-bay-wide building measuring 34 by 60 feet (10 by 18 m). It is constructed of brick, with an ashlar granite-faced first story and a mansard roof. It features round arched window openings and a heavy wood cornice. In February 2010, the building was undergoing renovation.

The building was added to the National Register of Historic Places in 1980.

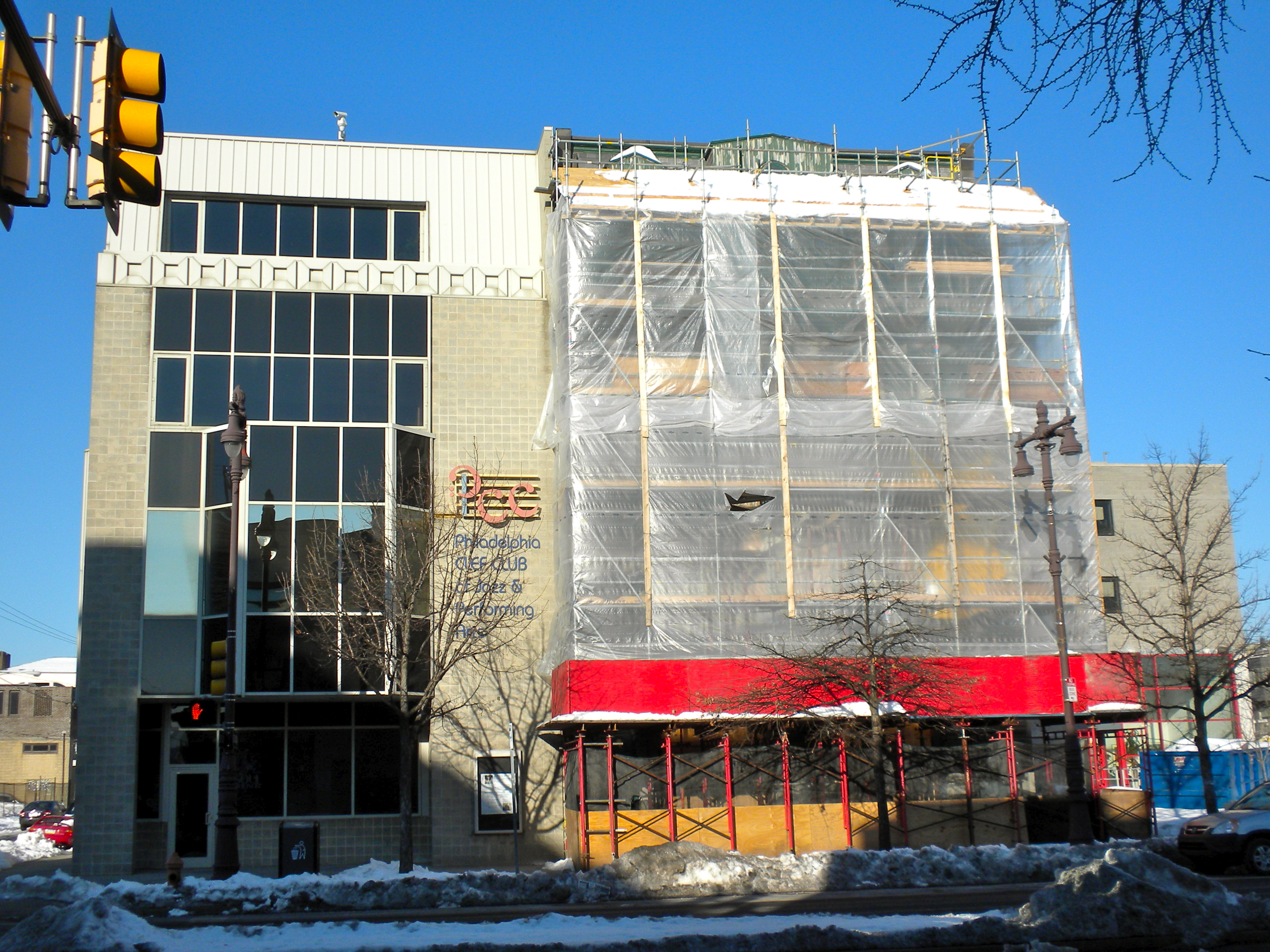
Undergoing renovation in 2010
