= William S. Peirce School =

- U.S. National Register of Historic Places
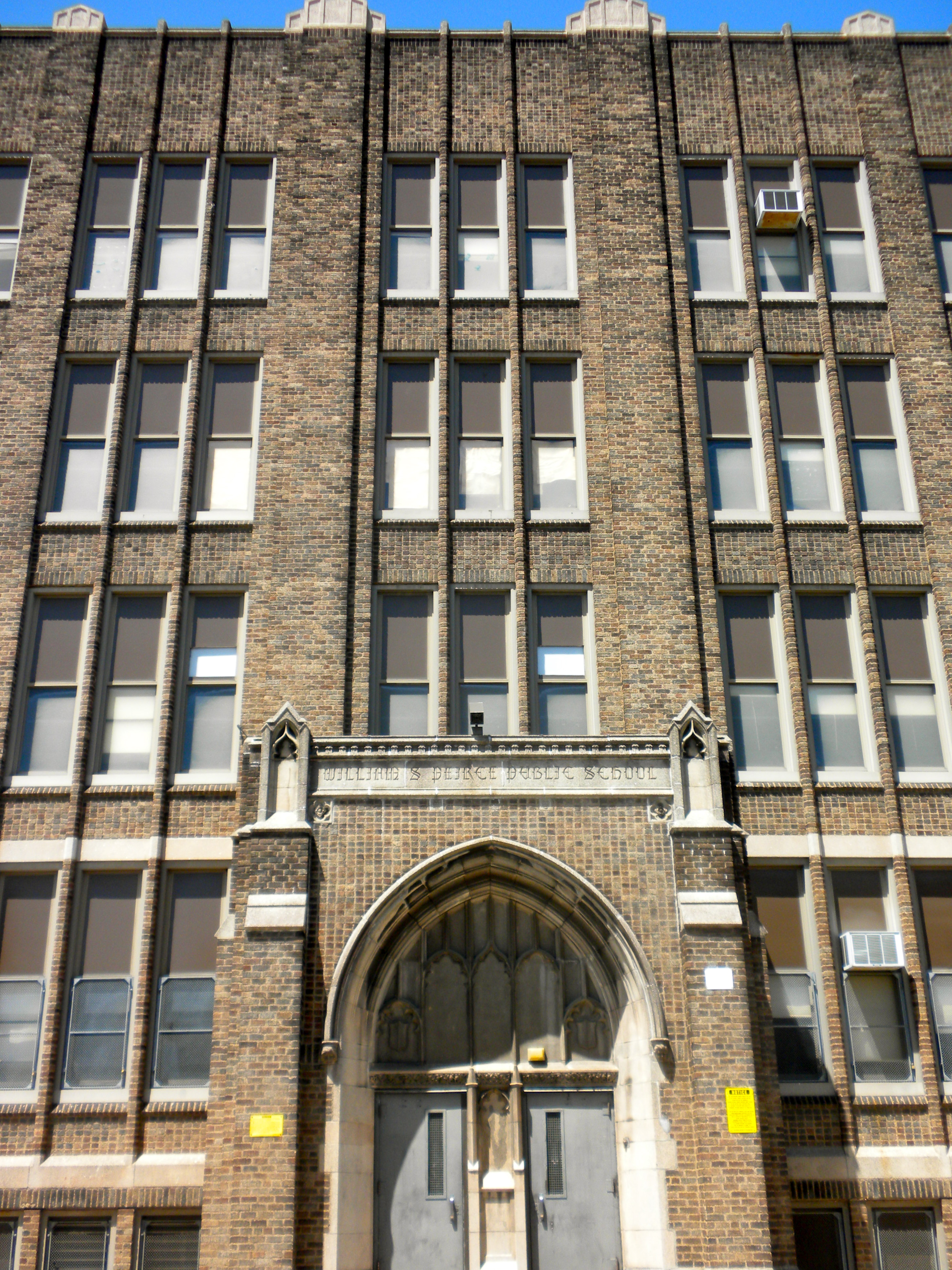
- William S. Peirce School, May 2010

- Location within Philadelphia Location within Pennsylvania Location within the United States
- Location: 2400 Christian St., Philadelphia, Pennsylvania, United States
- Coordinates: 39.9418°N 75.1830°W
- Area: 2 acres (0.81 ha)
- Built: 1928–1929
- Built by: Weiss Construction Co.
- Architect: Irwin T. Catharine
- Architectural style: Late Gothic Revival
- MPS: Philadelphia Public Schools TR
- NRHP reference No.: 88002307
- Added to NRHP: November 18, 1988

The William S. Peirce School is a historic school building that is located in the Southwest Center City neighborhood of Philadelphia, Pennsylvania, United States.

Designed by Irwin T. Catharine and built between 1928 and 1929, it is a four-story, nine-bay, brick building that sits on a raised basement. Created in the Late Gothic Revival-style, it features pilasters with limestone caps and a projecting entrance pavilion with an arched opening.

== History ==
This historic building opened in 1928 as a K-8 school, but elementary grades were dropped in 1988.

It was added to the National Register of Historic Places in 1988.

By 2002 Universal Companies took control of the school.

The school has been closed since 2007, although the building is still owned by the School District of Philadelphia.
