= Royal Theater (Philadelphia) =

Former center of African American culture in Philadelphia, Pennsylvania

- U.S. National Register of Historic Places
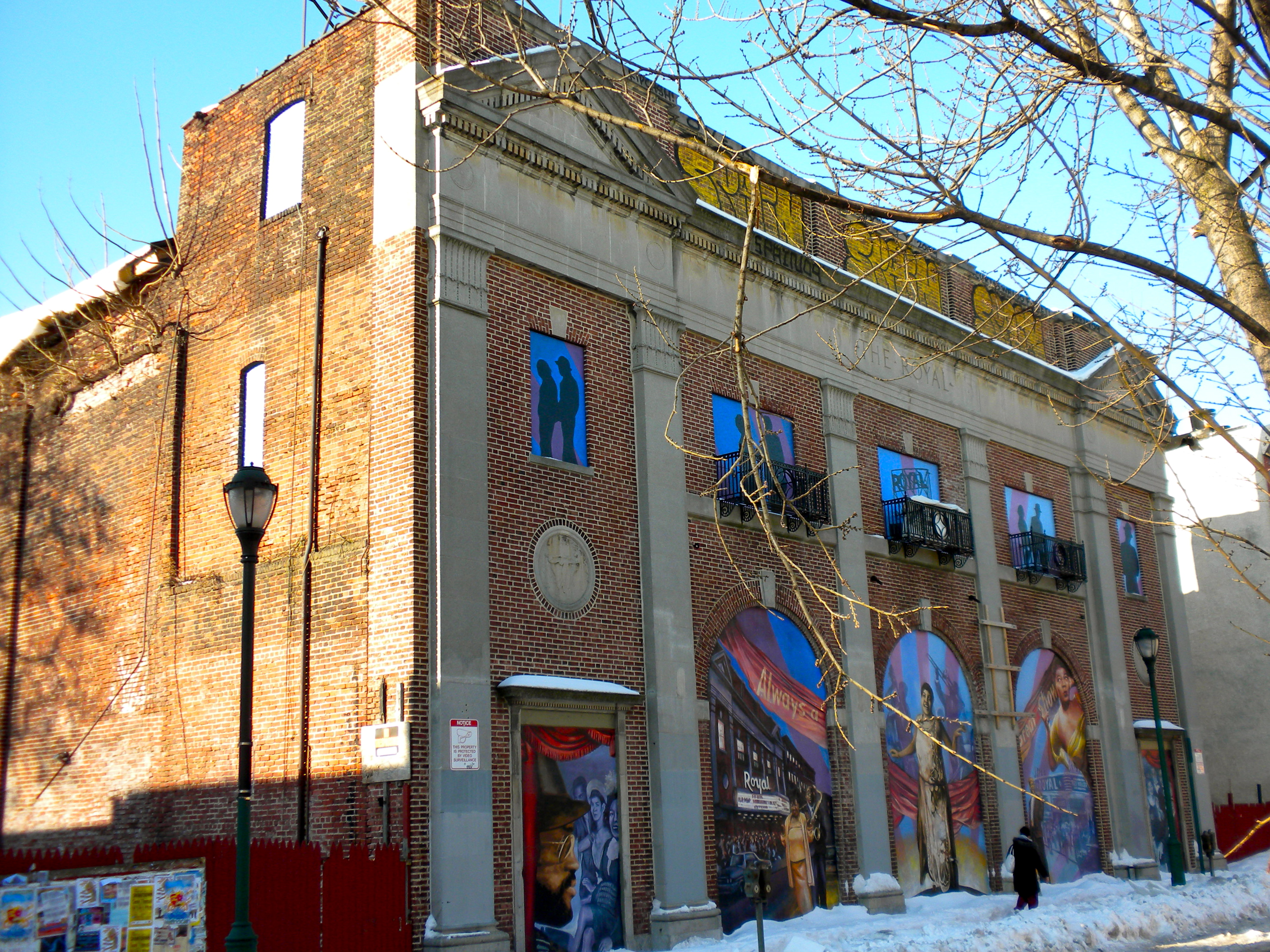

- Location within Philadelphia Location within Pennsylvania Location within the United States
- Location: 1524–1534 South St., Philadelphia, Pennsylvania
- Coordinates: 39°56′37″N 75°10′6″W
- Area: 0.3 acres (0.12 ha)
- Built: 1919
- Architect: Frank E. Hahn
- Architectural style: Regency Revival
- NRHP reference No.: 80003619
- Added to NRHP: February 8, 1980

The Royal Theater was a center of African American culture in Philadelphia, Pennsylvania. Built in 1919, by the 1930s the theater had earned the reputation as "America's Finest Colored Photoplayhouse". The theater closed in 1970, after attendance dwindled and the threat of the Crosstown Expressway had decimated the neighborhood. (The proposed highway was never built.)

In 2000, Kenny Gamble's Universal Companies purchased the Royal, 1522 and 1536 South, buildings on either side of the theater, as well as 1523, 1537 and 1539 Kater St. (the narrow street just south of South) and 1521–1523 South St. (across the street), from the Preservation Alliance for Greater Philadelphia for $250,000.

== Conservatorship lawsuit ==
In April 2013, Universal Companies applied for a demolition permit claiming the renovation was "economically unfeasible." Universal's proposal would preserve only the facade and a small portion of the front for culture use while the remaining property would be developed for commercial use. On May 20, 2013, local Philadelphia resident Juan Levy filed in the Pennsylvania Court of Common Pleas a petition seeking to appoint local real estate developer Ori Feibush as conservator over the property to save it from further deterioration.

== Redevelopment study ==
In April 2015 an independent architectural surveyor presented a financial feasibility analysis for various reuse scenarios for the Royal. The surveyor concluded that the building was reduced to a shell and "...there is no use to which the Royal Theater may be reasonably adapted given the cost of renovations and the revenues that can be expected by those uses..." In July 2015 the Philadelphia Historical Commission approved the owners plan to demolish the auditorium and preserve the Royal's facade which would be incorporated into a new retail and residential building. Demolition of the auditorium began in 2017. In the fall of 2021, the Royal re-opened as a restaurant, Rex at the Royal (Rex previously existing as REX 1516 down the street from the theater).

== Legacy ==
In 1936 the staff of the Royal organized to form the Colored Motion Picture Operators Union. The last public event to be held at the Royal occurred in June 2009. A preservation coalition presented two performances of jazz and video in the ruins of the auditorium.
