= West Passyunk =

- Neighborhood of Philadelphia
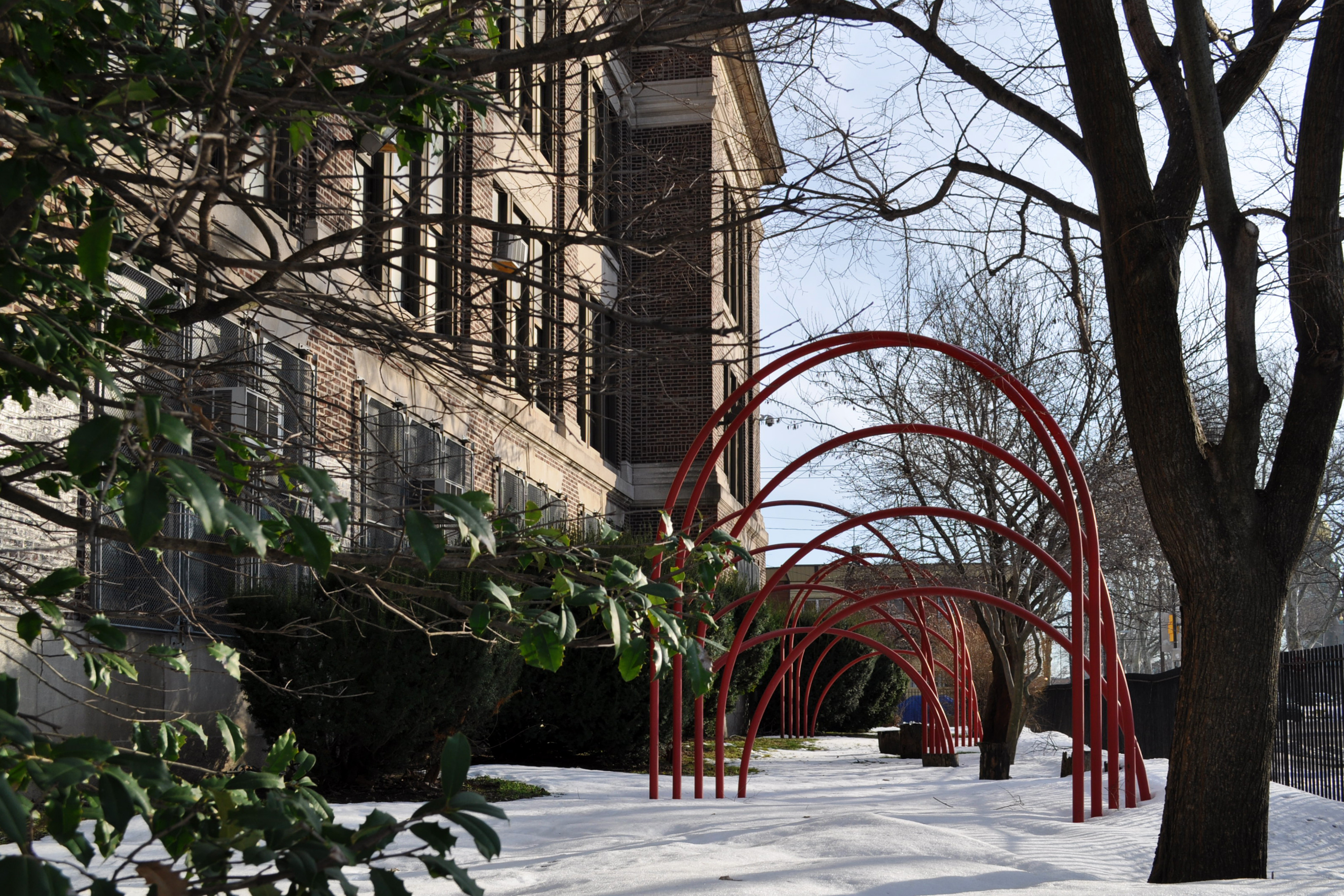
- Universal Vare Charter School in Winter

- Location within Philadelphia
- Country: United States
- State: Pennsylvania
- County: Philadelphia
- City: Philadelphia
- ZIP code: 19145
- Area codes: Area codes 215, 267, and 445

West Passyunk is a neighborhood in South Philadelphia, Pennsylvania, United States. It is bounded by Mifflin Street to the north, West Passyunk Avenue to the south, South 18th Street to east, and South 25th Street to the west. It is served by the 1st Police District, located at 24th and Wolf Streets.

== Education ==
=== Primary and secondary schools ===
Residents are zoned to the School District of Philadelphia.

Neighborhood children attend either Stephen Girard School (K-4) at 18th Street and Snyder Avenue, James Alcorn Elementary (K-8) at 32nd and Dickinson Street in Grays Ferry, or Delaplaine McDaniel Elementary School (K-6) at 21st and Moore Streets in nearby Point Breeze for elementary school as assigned by the School District of Philadelphia by geographical location.

Designated middle schools are Norris S. Barratt Middle (7-8) at 16th and Wharton Streets in Newbold or Universal Vare Charter School, formerly the Edwin H. Vare Middle School (5-8) at 24th Street and Snyder Avenue.

High schoolers attend South Philadelphia High School at Broad Street and Snyder Avenue in East Passyunk Crossing.

GAMP, a special admissions school for grades 5-12 focusing on performing arts, is also located nearby at 22nd and Ritner Streets in Girard Estate.

The Archdiocese of Philadelphia also operates St. Monica School (PK-8), with locations at both 1725 West Ritner Street (senior school) & 16th and Porter Streets (junior school) in Girard Estate, along with St. Thomas Aquinas Parish School (PK-8) at 1718 Morris Street in Newbold, in close proximity.

== Public libraries ==
The Free Library of Philadelphia Thomas F. Donatucci, Sr. Branch (formerly the Passyunk Branch), located at 20th and Shunk Streets, serves West Passyunk. The library received its current name in 2004.

== Public housing ==
Wilson Park, a 727 unit complex consisting of high & low-rises, is located at 25th and Jackson Streets.

== Playground and park ==
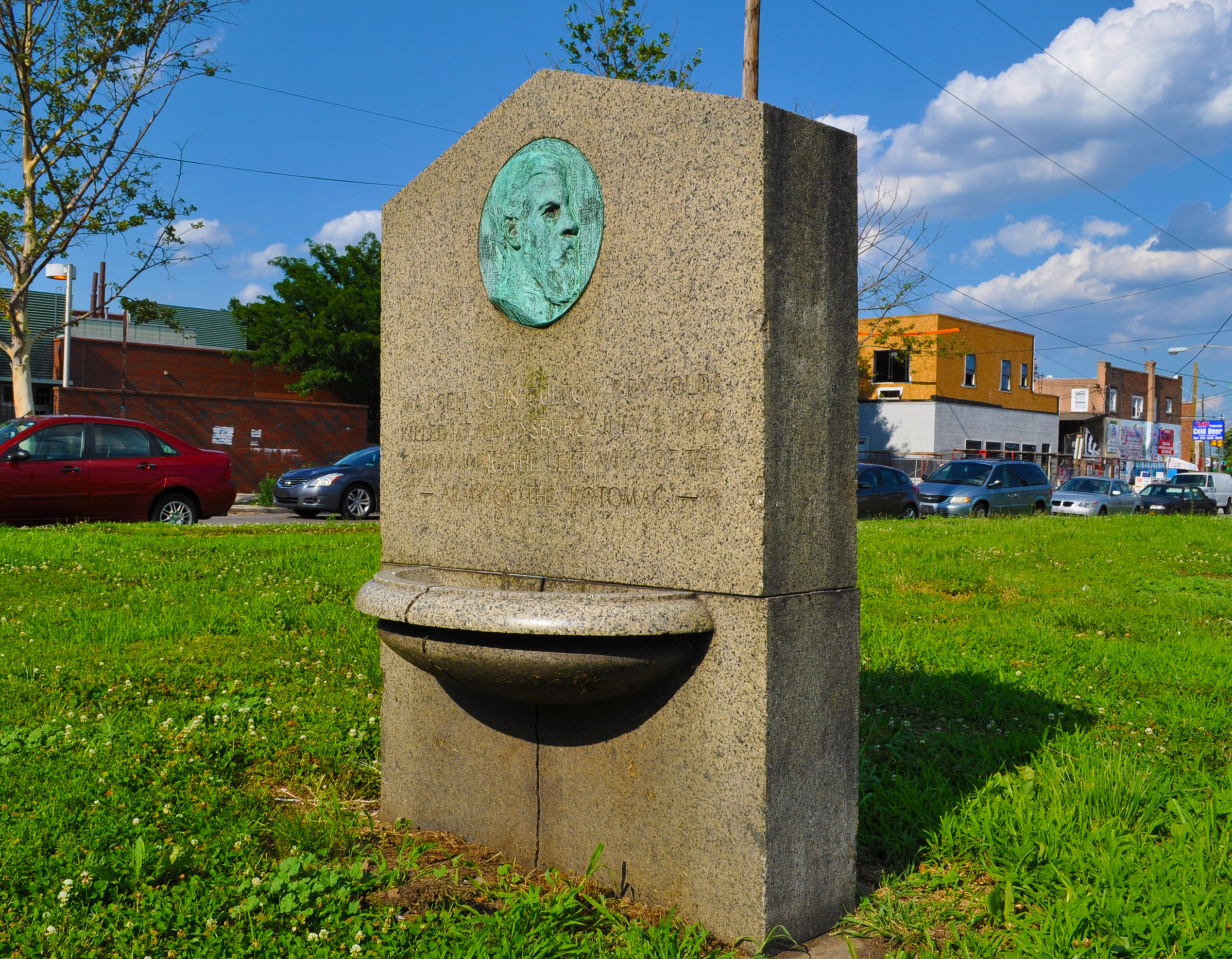
Major General John Fulton Reynolds Monument, Warriner Park Triangle

Thomas B. Smith Recreation Center, 2100 S 24th St. 7.6-acre site with playground equipment, a sprayground, basketball courts, handball courts, and sports fields, a football field with artificial turf, a fitness trail, and solar-paneled shade structures. The three-room building has a public computing center and multi-purpose spaces that host a mix of youth activities. In 1917 the site was named for mayor Thomas B. Smith.

Along 24th Street, from McKean Street to Passyunk Avenue, is a tree-lined parkway and walkway, which ends at the triangular Warriner Park, where a monument to Major General John Fulton Reynolds stands.

== Public transit ==
The Southeastern Pennsylvania Transportation Authority (SEPTA) operates a number of buses in the area:

- Rt 79 - East/Westbound on Snyder Ave.
- Rt 37 - East/Westbound on Passyunk Ave.
- Rt 17 - Southbound on 19th St.
- Rt 17 - Northbound on 20th St.
- Rt 7 - Northbound on 22nd St.
- Rt 7 - Southbound on 23rd St.

== Civic group ==
West Passyunk Neighbors Association (WPNA) is a volunteer based registered community organization of residents, property owners and business owners.

== See also ==
- Passyunk Township, Pennsylvania
