= Landreth =

Landreth is a surname. Notable people with the surname include:

- Bill Landreth (born 1963), American computer hacker
- Chris Landreth (born 1961), Canadian film maker
- Larry Landreth (born 1955), Canadian baseball player
- Molly Landreth, American freelance photographer and artist
- Orian Landreth (1904–1996), American football coach
- S. Floyd Landreth (1885–1977), American senator of Virginia
- Sonny Landreth (born 1951), American musician
- The Bros. Landreth, Canadian musicians

== See also ==
- Landreth Glacier, Antarctica
- David Landreth School, historic school building
- D. Landreth Seed Company, oldest seed company in the United States
