= EPX =

EPX may refer to:

- Eosinophil peroxidase, a protein
- East Passyunk Crossing, Philadelphia, Pennsylvania, a neighborhood
- Eric's Pixel Expansion, a pixel art scaling algorithm
