= Zoe Strauss =

American photographer

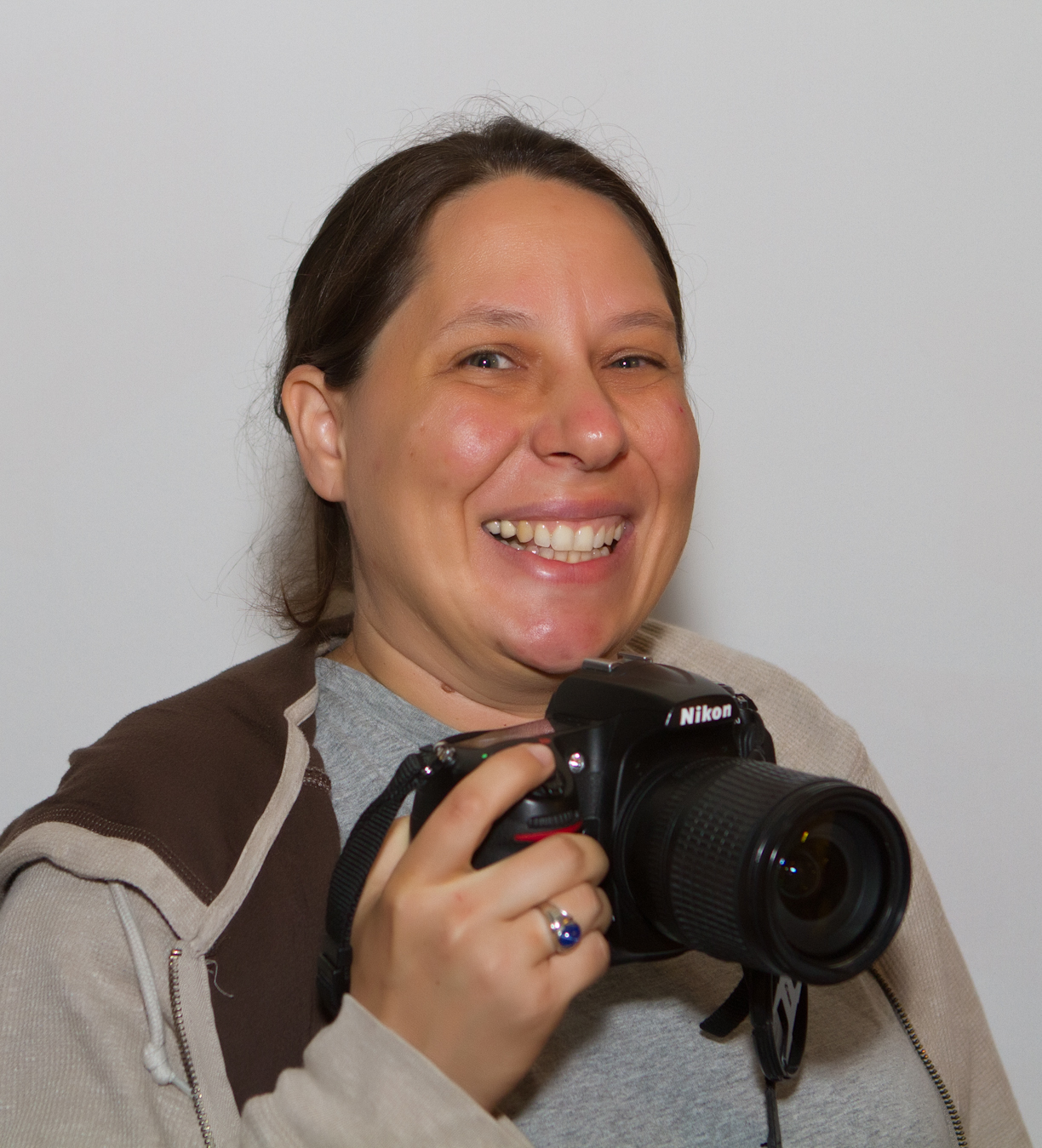
- Strauss in 2011
- Born: 1970 (age 55–56); Philadelphia, Pennsylvania, U.S.
- Known for: Photography
- Website: www.zoestrauss.com

Zoe Strauss (born 1970) is an American photographer and a nominee member of Magnum Photos. She uses Philadelphia as a primary setting and subject for her work. Curator Peter Barberie identifies her as a street photographer, like Walker Evans or Robert Frank, and has said "the woman and man on the street, yearning to be heard, are the basis of her art."

In 2006 her work was included in the Whitney Biennial and her solo exhibition, Ramp Project: Zoe Strauss, was shown at the Institute of Contemporary Art, Philadelphia. In 2012 a mid-career retrospective, Zoe Strauss: 10 Years, was shown at Philadelphia Museum of Art, accompanied in Philadelphia by a display of 54 billboards showing her photographs, and at the International Center of Photography in New York City.

Strauss received a Seedling Award from the Leeway Foundation in 2002, a Pew Fellowship in 2005, a USA Gund Fellowship and a grant of $50,000 by United States Artists in 2007, and a Guggenheim Fellowship in 2017.

== Life and work ==
Strauss was born in 1970 in Philadelphia. Her father died when she was 5. She was the first member of her immediate family to graduate from high school. For her 30th birthday she was given a camera and started photographing in the city's marginal neighborhoods. She is a photo-based installation artist who uses Philadelphia as a primary setting and subject for her work. Strauss typically photographs overlooked (or purposefully avoided) details with a humanist perspective and eye for composure.

In 1995, Strauss started the Philadelphia Public Art Project, a one-woman organization whose mission is to give the citizens of Philadelphia access to art in their everyday lives. Strauss calls the Project an "epic narrative" of her own neighborhood. "When I started shooting, it was as if somewhere hidden in my head I had been waiting for this," she has said.

Between 2000 and 2011, Strauss's photographic work culminated in a yearly Under I-95 show which took place in a public space beneath an I-95 highway overpass in South Philadelphia. She displayed her photographs on concrete bridge supports under the highway and offered photocopies for $5 each. The exhibit Zoe Strauss: 10 Years was organized by the Philadelphia Museum of Art, where it appeared in 2012, and was also shown at the International Center of Photography, New York City, in 2013/2014. The show was a mid-career retrospective, building upon Strauss' ten years of photographic works, shown yearly from 2001 up to 2010. The 2012 exhibition was the first critical assessment of Strauss' ten-year project, and was accompanied by a 250-illustration catalogue, Zoe Strauss: 10 Years.

The 2012 Philadelphia Museum of Art exhibition included the installation throughout Philadelphia of 54 billboards featuring Strauss' photographs. Although they could be viewed individually, the images were loosely structured around the themes of the Odyssey, journey and homecoming. In this, the Billboard Project was similar to Strauss' annual I-95 exhibition which she describes as an "epic narrative about the beauty and struggle of everyday life". The Billboard Project included photographs from Strauss's travels around the country, from the Gulf of Mexico to Fairbanks, AK.

She frequently photographs near her grandparents' former home at 16th and Susquehanna. Her photographs include shuttered buildings, empty parking lots and vacant meeting halls in South Philadelphia. Strauss says her work is "a narrative about the beauty and difficulty of everyday life."

In July 2012 Strauss was elected into the Magnum Photos agency as a nominee.

Strauss served as a Dodd Chair (2014–2015) at the Lamar Dodd School of Art.

== Publications ==
- America. AMMO, 2008. ISBN 978-1934429136.
- Zoe Strauss: 10 Years. Philadelphia: Philadelphia Museum of Art; New Haven: Yale University, 2012. ISBN 978-0300179774. Exhibition catalogue.

== Exhibitions ==
=== Solo exhibitions ===
- 2002–2009: Works-in-Progress, Southwark Community Center, Southwark, Philadelphia, last week of October annually
- 2001–2010: Under I-95 exhibit, under Interstate 95, Front St. and Mifflin St., Philadelphia, the first weekend of May annually
- 2006: Projected and Selected Images, Acuna-Hansen Gallery, Los Angeles, CA
- 2006: Ramp Project, Institute of Contemporary Art, Philadelphia
- 2007: I-95 Works in Progress, Etc. Galerie, Prague
- 2007: If You Reading This, Silverstein Photography, New York City
- 2008: Zoe Strauss: Works in Progress, Peeler Art Center, DePauw University, Greencastle, Indiana
- 2009: America: We Love Having You Here, Bruce Silverstein Gallery, New York City
- 2010: Zoe Strauss: Works for Columbus, OH, Wexner Center for the Arts, Columbus, Ohio
- 2012: Zoe Strauss: 10 Years, Philadelphia Museum of Art, Philadelphia, January 2012 – April 2012; Zoe Strauss: 10 Years: A Slideshow, Bruce Silverstein Gallery, New York City, 2012; International Center of Photography, New York City, October 2013 – January 2014.

=== Group exhibitions ===
- 1997: Indianapolis Installation Festival, Whirlforce Medical Research Laboratories, Indianapolis Juried Exhibition, 3rd in show.
- 2002: Leeway Award winners group show, Philadelphia Art Alliance, Philadelphia
- 2004: Big Nothing Cabaret, Institute of Contemporary Art, Philadelphia
- 2004: Works on Paper 2004, 23rd biennial juried show for area artists, Arcadia University, Glenside, PA
- 2006: Whitney Biennial: Day for Night, 73rd Whitney Biennial, Whitney Museum of American Art, New York City
- 2006: Summer Vacation: Photographs from the Collection, Philadelphia Museum of Art, Philadelphia
- 2006: This Is America, Centraal Museum, Utrecht, Netherlands
- 2008: History Keeps Me Awake at Night: A Genealogy of Wojnarowicz, PPOW Gallery, New York City
- 2008: L’Été photographique de Lectoure, Lectoure, France.
- 2008: Who's Afraid of America?, Wonderland Art Space, Copenhagen
- 2009: On the Scene: Jason Lazarus, Wolfgang Plöger, Zoe Strauss, Art Institute of Chicago, Chicago, IL
- 2010: Queer Brighton: Molly Landreth & Zoe Strauss, Lighthouse, Brighton, UK. Part of Brighton Photo Biennial.
- 2013: Homesteading was part of the 2013 Carnegie International, Pittsburgh
- 2026: This Is America: Selections from PAMM's Collection, Pérez Art Museum Miami, Florida

== Commissions ==
- 2007 Philadelphia Eagles/Lincoln Financial Field, vinyl print of Mattress Flip
- 2008 World Class Boxing, Art Miami

== Collections ==
Strauss' work is held in the following permanent public collection:

- Philadelphia Museum of Art, Pennsylvania
- International Center of Photography, New York
- Pérez Art Museum Miami, Florida

== Awards ==
- 2002: Seedling Award, Leeway Foundation, Philadelphia, PA
- 2004: Joint winner, Friends of Arcadia Awards, during Works on Paper 2004, Arcadia University, Glenside, PA
- 2005: Pew Fellowship in the Arts, Pew Center for Arts & Heritage, Philadelphia, PA
- 2007: $50,000 grant from United States Artists, Chicago, IL
- 2017: Guggenheim Fellowship from the John Simon Guggenheim Memorial Foundation
