= Landrith =

Landrith is a surname. Notable people with the surname include:

- George Landrith (born 1960), American lawyer and political activist
- Hobie Landrith (1930–2023), American baseball player
- Ira Landrith (1865–1941), American Presbyterian minister and temperance activist

== See also ==
- Landreth (disambiguation)
