= Point Breeze, Philadelphia =

Point Breeze
- Neighborhood of Philadelphia
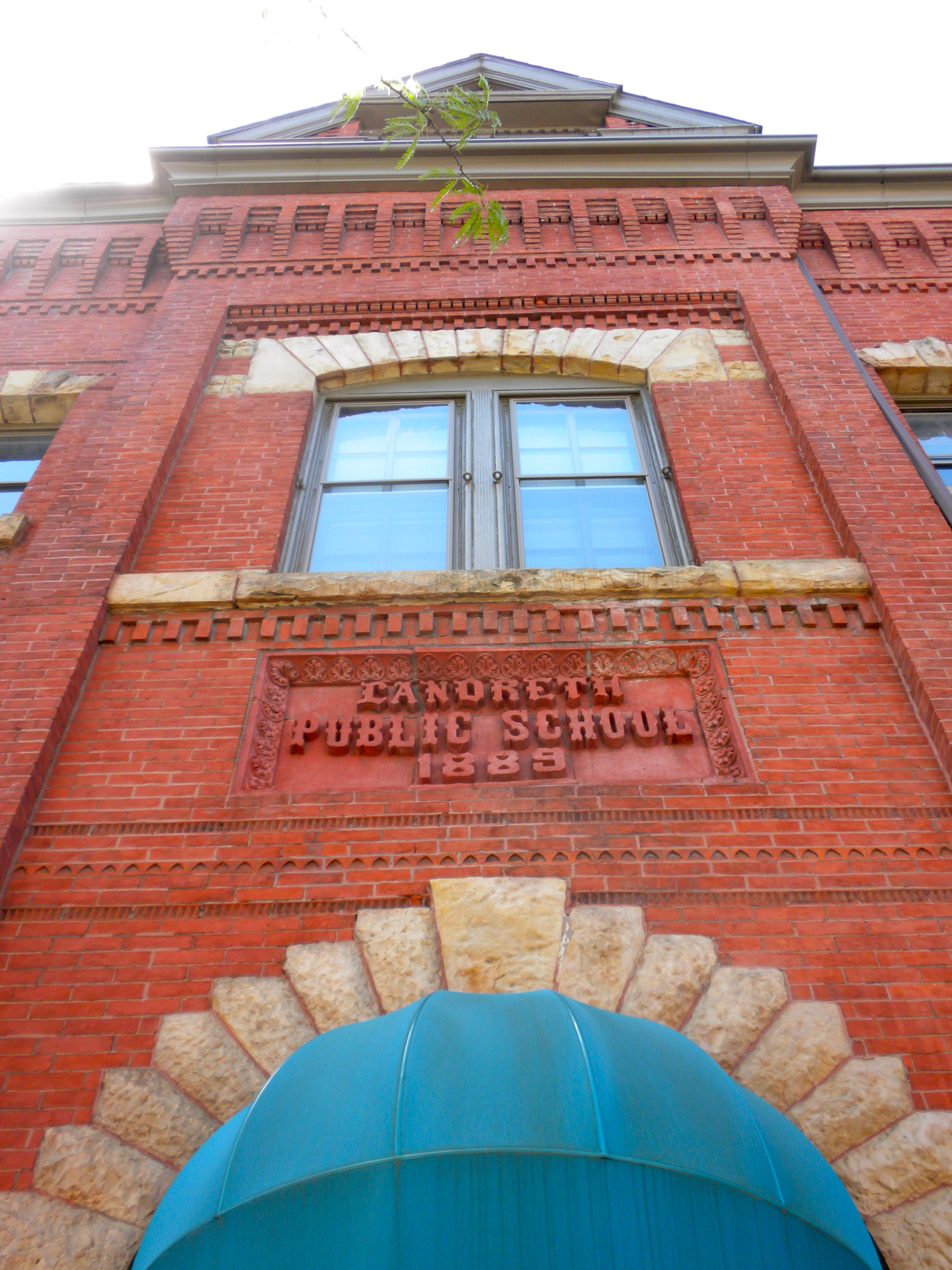
- David Landreth School

- Location within Philadelphia
- Country: United States
- State: Pennsylvania
- County: Philadelphia
- City: Philadelphia
- ZIP Code: 19145, 19146
- Area codes: 215, 267 and 445

Point Breeze is a multicultural neighborhood in South Philadelphia. It is bounded by 25th Street to the west, Washington Avenue to the north, Broad Street to the east, and Moore Street to the south. Southwest Center City lies to its north. Passyunk Square and East Passyunk Crossing lie to its east. Point Breeze is separated from Grays Ferry to the west by a CSX railway viaduct over 25th Street.

== History ==
According to historical maps, much of what is South Philadelphia, including Point Breeze, was still not yet developed and integrated into the rectilinear grid system by 1843 or later. "Point Breeze" was a point on the western side of the Schuylkill River, approximately where the Passyunk Avenue bridge is today.

In the 1860s it and the area across on the eastern side of the river were developed as an area for oil refinery by the Atlantic Petroleum Company, later the Atlantic Richfield Company (ARCO). Oil that had been extracted in Western Pennsylvania could be processed here and then shipped down the Schuylkill, to the Delaware and out to sea. The Avenue that connected the city proper to the east side of the river at Point Breeze was known in 1808 as "Long Lane."

In the mid-to-late 1800s, development of Philadelphia continued westward from the Delaware River and southward from Market Street. Long Lane also began to be known as Point Breeze Avenue by 1895 and lent its name to the neighborhood that was to spring up here. "The earliest references to Point Breeze" as a neighborhood "date to 1895." The area was first settled by working-class European Jewish immigrants, followed by Italian and Irish immigrants. In 1930s numerous African Americans settled here, some of whom had come North in the Great Migration, escaping Jim Crow in the South and looking for work in industrial cities. At this time the African-American center of Philadelphia was shifting from near Mother Bethel African Methodist Episcopal Church at 6th and Lombard, to west of Broad.

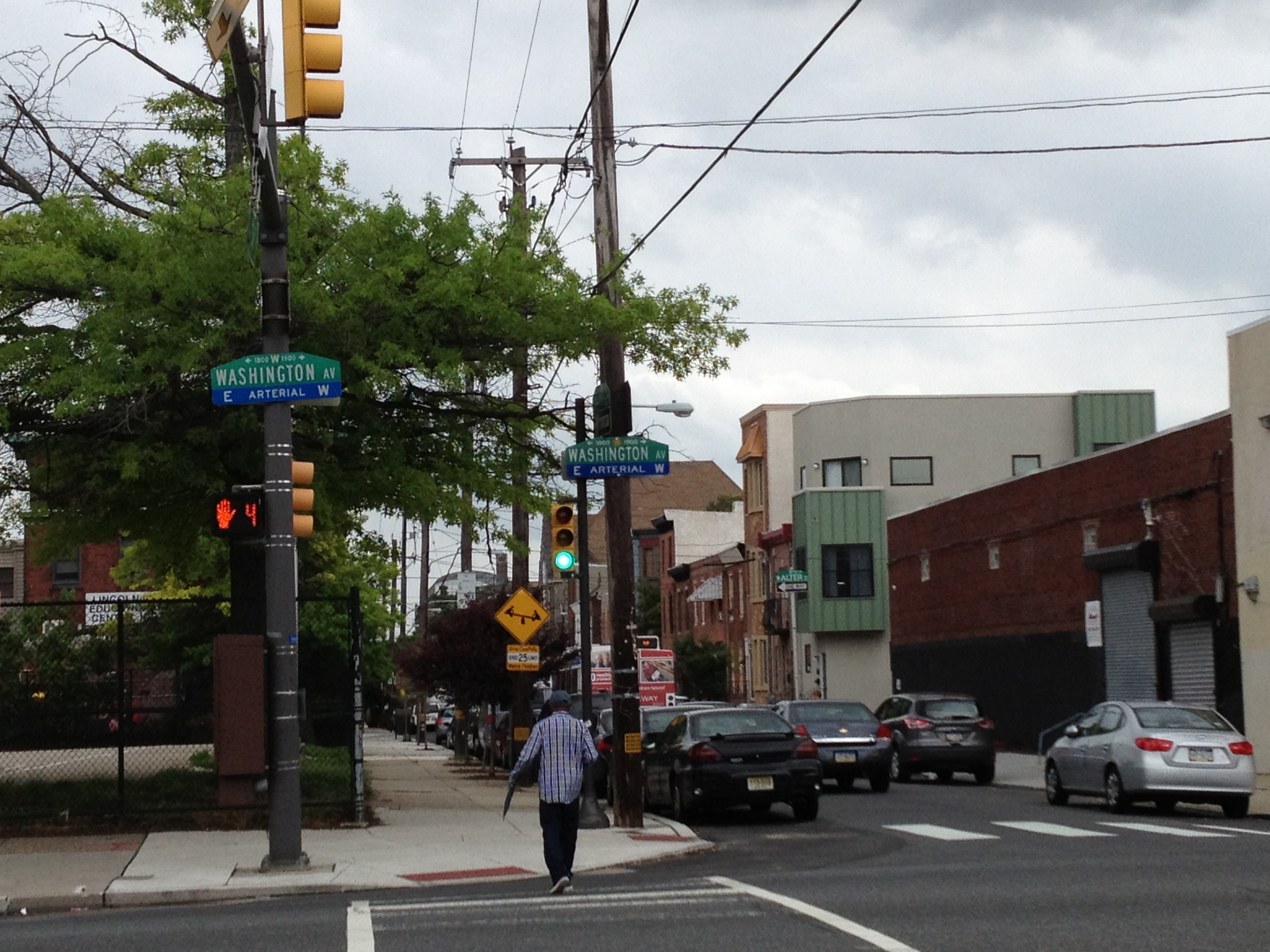
Washington Avenue and 19th Street, looking into Point Breeze

Through the 1960s Point Breeze was reported to be a safe, clean, relatively integrated, and self-sufficient neighborhood, with a thriving business district along Point Breeze Avenue. Residents called it "The Breeze." Rising racial tensions, fear of race riots and white flight in the 1960s and 1970s resulted in many businesses moving away, and the neighborhood becoming majority African American. Also at this time, people who could afford it often moved to newer suburban housing, aided by greater ease in commuting by public transit and highways.

The heroin epidemic of the 1970s, and crack epidemic of the '90s and related crime adversely affected Point Breeze. Between 1988 and 1990 the Philadelphia Police department conducted raids in Point Breeze to shut down the Carr family drug ring; it reportedly had been selling $1.3 million per year in crack, cocaine and prescription drugs.

The Point Breeze Performing Arts Center opened in 1984 on Point Breeze Avenue. From 1990 through 2000 Point Breeze lost approximately 10% of its population. Despite this, since the 1990s some revitalization efforts have taken place; such organizations as South Philadelphia H.O.M.E.S. and Universal Companies, owned by Kenny Gamble, have helped build low-income housing and schools in the area.

Immigrants from Southeast Asia have moved into Point Breeze in the 1990s and 2000s. For example, in the 2000 census Point Breeze contained the highest concentration of Vietnamese in the city; the more than 900 Vietnamese people comprised nearly 12% of the population of Point Breeze.

In the 2000s and beyond, Point Breeze has had some revitalization through gentrification. Real estate investors such as John Longacre and Ori Feibush have begun developing property here, especially along the Broad Street and Washington Avenue corridors. While many residents resent the changing neighborhoods and feel displaced in areas they once called home, others believe such change signals a booming resurgence in the area, which has both trendy bars and lower crime. In 2016 the YouTube channel "New Neighbors" interviewed longtime Point Breeze residents about the gentrification efforts. One man said existing residents were harassed by increased police scrutiny; a woman said that her brother was killed here long ago. She noted the lack of shopping for regular goods.

She said,

"We have everything in Point Breeze that's no good for any human consumption, it [Point Breeze] does not nurture any entrepreneur spirit or anything else - other than people that are foreigners, that come in and get money to open up businesses in the community. Who do not necessarily give back when you ask...but I think it's a great thing in terms of the changes in the community, I welcome it with open arms."

In July 2019 the Philadelphia Inquirer published an op-ed titled "Gentrification displaced my family from Point Breeze", written by Angelita Ellison, Philadelphia City Clerk. She described the hardship of being displaced from her neighborhood of 16 years, and after leaving, seeing the renovation of a long unused and unfunded neighborhood tennis court.

As a response to recent gentrification in the area, a community land trust sponsored by the Women's Community Revitalization Project was created to cover at least five homes in the area with 99-year transferable leases. Overall public reaction to gentrification remains mixed. While some residents are not bothered and outreach organizations are helping those in need, some residents have vandalized new properties, spraying anarchy symbols and other messages such as "(expletive) the rich.

A number of historic buildings in the area, including the George W. Childs School, David Landreth School, Marine Corps Supply Activity, Delaplaine McDaniel School, Jeremiah Nichols School, Walter George Smith School, and the former Francis M. Drexel School are listed on the National Register of Historic Places.

== Name origin ==
'Point Breeze' was originally the name given to a spot on the west side of the Schuylkill River. Point Breeze Avenue then became the road that cut southwest to provide access to the spot from what was at the time Philadelphia proper. The avenue cuts diagonally through the neighborhood's rectilinear street grid.

== Culture ==
Point Breeze is home to several Philadelphia Mural Arts Program murals. In 1987 Keith Haring collaborated with CityKids, a New York-based youth organization, to create a mural titled We the Youth located at 22nd and Ellsworth in Point Breeze. In 2013 the Mural Arts program restored the mural and a small community garden was built beneath it.

== Education ==
Residents are zoned to the School District of Philadelphia. There are 4 catchment areas in Point Breeze. Delaplaine McDaniel School K–8 (named after the Quaker merchant) at 22nd and Moore serves the westernmost catchment, Edwin M. Stanton School K-8 (named after the Secretary of War under Lincoln) at 17th and Christian serves the northernmost catchment and George W. Childs School K–8 (named after the publisher) at 16th and Wharton serves the easternmost catchment. All of the students in these three catchment areas are eligible to attend South Philadelphia High School. (Norris S. Barratt middle school was formerly the name of the school at 16th and Wharton but it closed in 2011 due to declining enrollment. The former George W. Childs elementary school built in 1894 at 17th and Tasker was placed on the National Register of Historic Places in 1988 but was shuttered in 2010 and its fate remains uncertain.) The southernmost catchment of Point Breeze attends Stephen Girard School K–4 (named after the wealthy banker) at 18th and Snyder, Universal Institute Charter School at Vare (for 5–8) at 24th and Snyder and Universal Institute Charter School at Audenried (grades 9-12) at 33rd and Tasker.

== Infrastructure and government ==
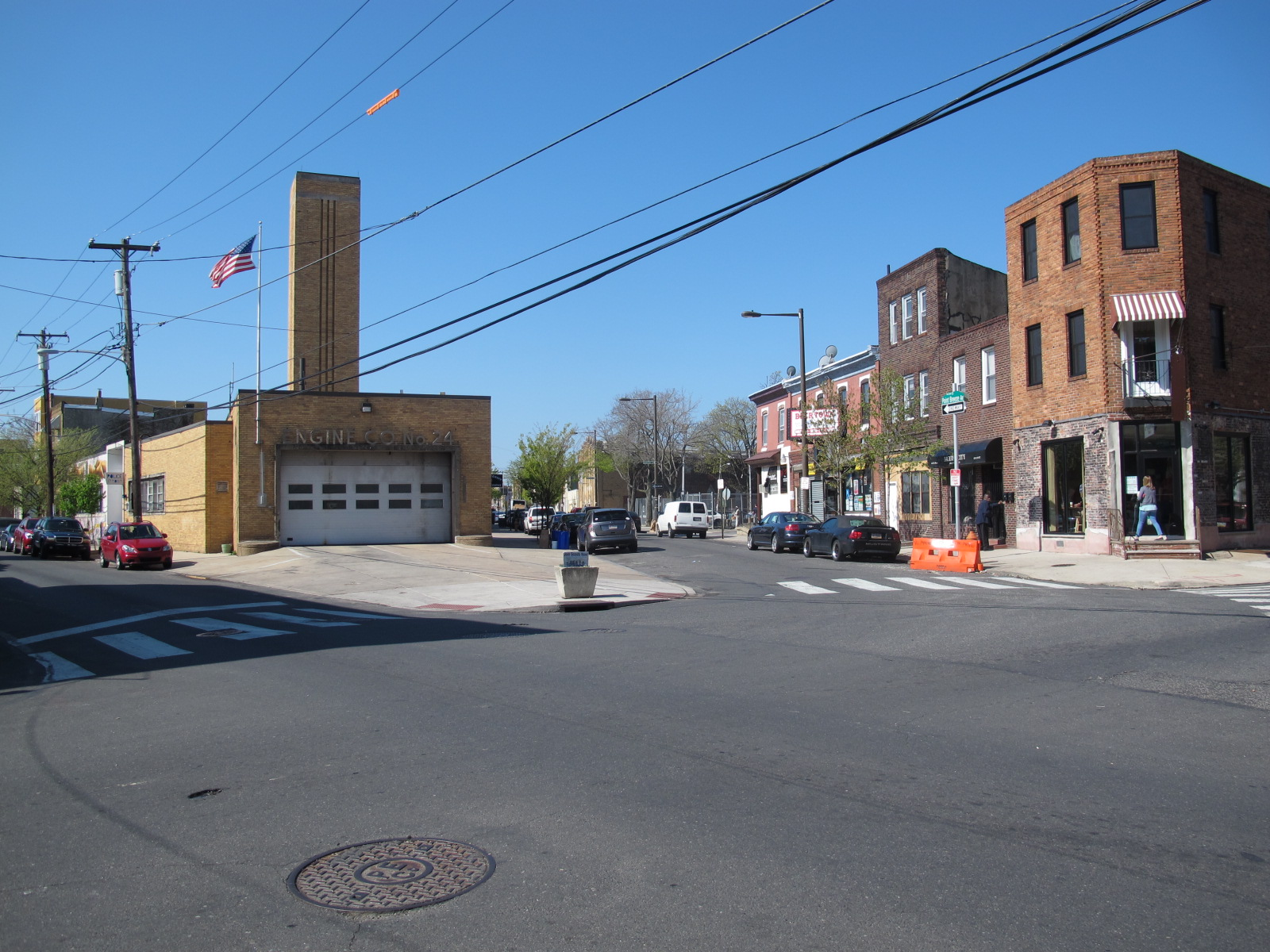
Point Breeze Avenue northern terminus. Federal Street running west is in the foreground. 20th Street is on the left, Point Breeze Avenue on the right. Philadelphia Fire Department Engine Company 24 visible at the corner with the Philadelphia Police Department 17th District office on the far left.

The United States Postal Service operates the Point Breeze Post Office at 2500 Snyder Avenue.

The Philadelphia Police Department's 17th District station is at the northern terminus of Point Breeze Avenue where it intersects 20th and Federal.

The Free Library of Philadelphia operates two branches in Point Breeze: the South Philadelphia Branch at Broad and Morris and the Queen Memorial Library at 23rd and Federal (located in the Landreth Apartments for seniors). On May 9, 2016 the $45.2 million, 96,000-square foot, LEED-certified South Philadelphia Community Health and Literacy Center officially opened at Broad and Morris Streets in Point Breeze. It houses the new South Philadelphia library branch, a CHOP pediatric primary care center, a Philadelphia Department of Public Health community health center, and a new DiSilvestro Playground and Recreation Center.

Point Breeze has several indoor and outdoor recreational areas:

- Chew Playground and Recreation Facility, 19th and Washington
- Wharton Square and Recreation Facility, 23rd and Wharton
- Smith Playground and Recreation Facility/Wilson Park, 24th and Snyder

== Transportation ==
Point Breeze is served by the SEPTA Broad Street Line, accessible at Snyder, Tasker-Morris, and Ellsworth-Federal stations, and several SEPTA bus routes run through the neighborhood.

== Notable people ==
- Tariq Trotter, a.k.a. Black Thought, rapper with Grammy award winning hip-hop group The Roots, from 23rd and Watkins
- Rasual Butler, NBA basketball player, from 20th and Manton
- Dwight Grant a.k.a. Beanie Sigel, rapper, from 24th and Sigel
- H. Patrick Swygert, former president of Howard University, from 15th and Wharton
- The Heath Brothers, jazz trio
- Dona Drake, Hollywood actress who passed for Latina in the 1940s, lived at 1622 W. 21st Street.
- Gene Perret, TV writer, of Sigel St.
- Richie Rome, producer, arranger and conductor, from 20th and
- Anthony Burrell, dancer who taught and choreographed at Point Breeze Performing Arts Center, from 22nd and Dickinson
- Anna C. Verna, former president of Philadelphia City Council, from 22nd and Dickinson
- John Blake, was an American jazz violinist, from 22nd and Oakford
- Mamie Nichols, local community activist
- Josh Kruger, Journalist and social justice advocate

== See also ==
- Francis M. Drexel School, formerly located in Point Breeze
