= South Philadelphia Shtiebel =

Synagogue in East Passyunk, South Philadelphia

- Yiddish: סאַוט פֿילאַדעלפֿיע שטיבל
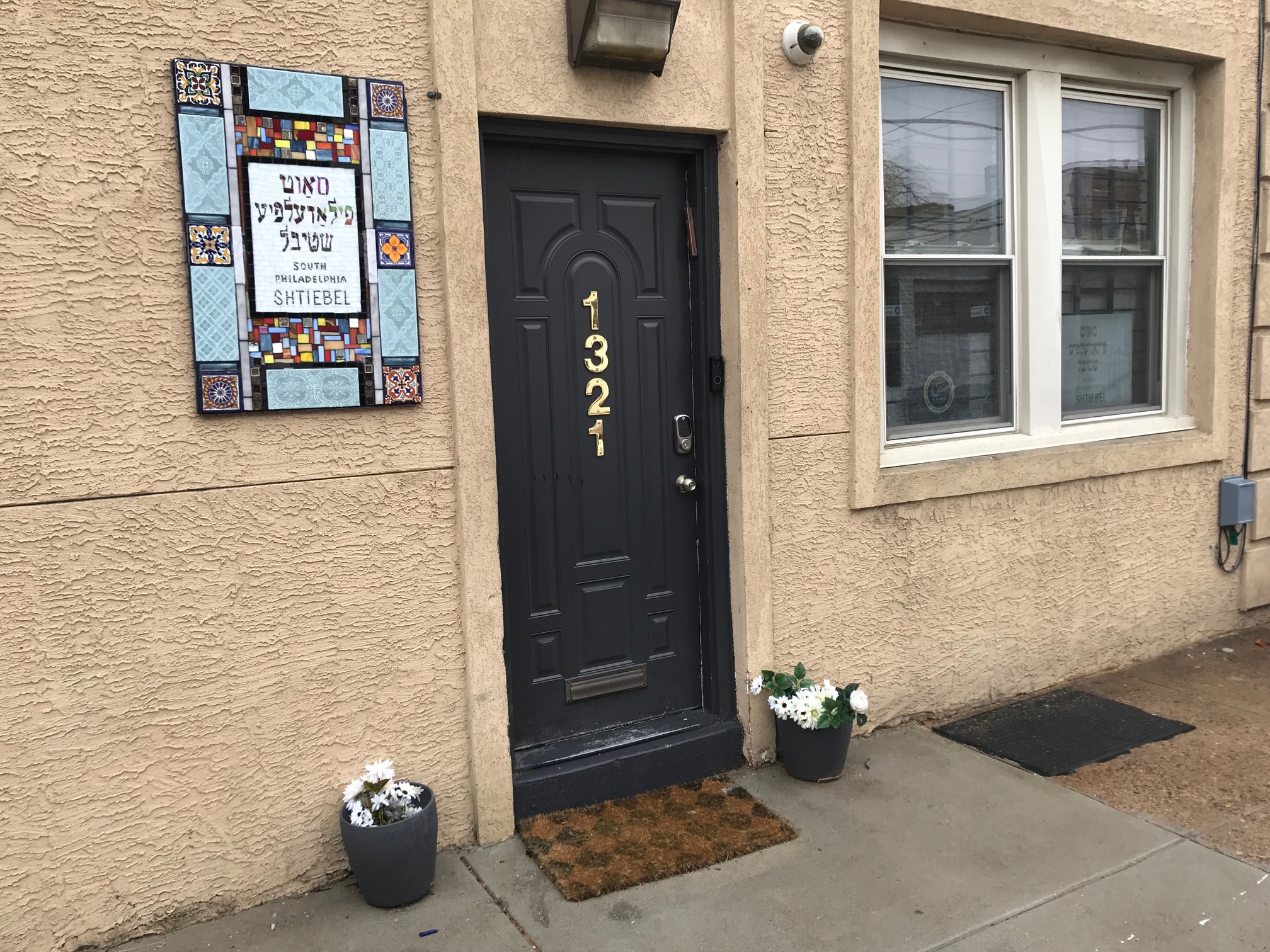
- The synagogue in 2022

- Location in Philadelphia

Religion
- Affiliation: Judaism
- Rite: Nusach Ashkenaz; Open Orthodox; Modern Orthodox; Religious Zionism
- Ecclesiastical or organisational status: Synagogue
- Leadership: Hadas Fruchter
- Status: Active

Location
- Location: 1311 South Juniper Street, East Passyunk, Philadelphia, Pennsylvania 19147
- Country: United States
- Coordinates: 39°56′01″N 75°10′00″W

Architecture
- Established: 2019 (as a congregation)
- Completed: 2021 (current location)

Website
- southphiladelphiashtiebel.org

The South Philadelphia Shtiebel (Yiddish: סאַוט פֿילאַדעלפֿיע שטיבל) is a Jewish congregation, synagogue, and community center, located in the East Passyunk neighborhood of South Philadelphia, Pennsylvania, in the United States. The congregation is led by Rabbanit Hadas "Dasi" Fruchter, and offers educational, community, and religious programming. Its prayers follow traditional Ashkenazi Modern Orthodox traditions, but it uniquely uses a "tri-chitzah," a mechitzah (the divider between the men's and women's sections) that has a third section for those who feel more comfortable sitting outside the gender-binary-defined two-section construction.

== History ==
South Philadelphia's Jewish community flourished between the 1880s and World War II. Between Third and Eighth Streets, and from Spruce Street south to Oregon Avenue, the Jewish community numbered 150,000 at its height in the 1940s. South Philadelphia was home to more than 150 "rowhouse Shuls" — small synagogues located in rowhouses where often the rabbi lived upstairs, and prayer took place downstairs. Rabbanit Fruchter chose to call the synagogue a "Shtiebel" in homage to this history.

The number of South Philadelphia shuls decreased in the late 1960s and early 1970s with changes in neighborhood demography. In 2019 there were approximately ten active synagogues in Society Hill and South Philadelphia, with only two south of South Street. In recent years, South Philadelphia neighborhoods have attracted new residents including a growing number of Orthodox Jews.

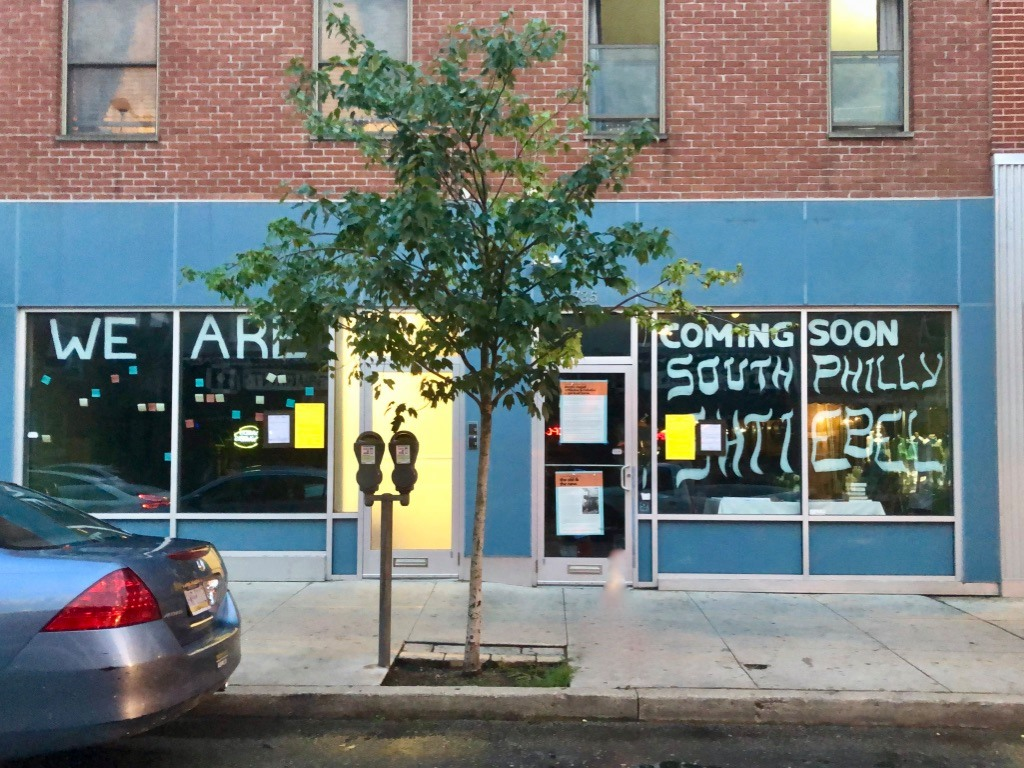
The synagogue's former location at 1733 E Passyunk Ave (June 2019)

Hadas "Dasi" Fruchter was ordained by the Open Orthodox-affiliated Yeshivat Maharat in June 2016 upon completion of the Maharat Semikha Program. She served three years as assistant spiritual leader at Beth Sholom Congregation and Talmud Torah in Potomac, Maryland. With initial funding and support from Hillel International's Office of Innovation, private donors, and Start-Up Shul, an Open Orthodox-affiliated organization that builds institutions, Fruchter announced her plans in July 2018 to move to Philadelphia and open her own synagogue that "will look like a typical modern Orthodox congregation".

Seeing the growing Jewish community in South Philadelphia and interest in additional local Jewish programming, Fruchter founded the South Philadelphia Shtiebel in 2019. The synagogue moved into a space at 1733 East Passyunk Avenue in March 2019, previously Philadelphia Scooters.

The synagogue held its first prayer services on Friday night, July 19, 2019, with 80 in attendance.

The synagogue was unable to hold indoor gatherings in its storefront following Purim in March 2020 and through the COVID-19 pandemic in Philadelphia. Programming was offered online and limited services held in open outdoor spaces. In closing its Passyunk Avenue location, the synagogue announced its plans to move into a larger physical location when indoor activities proved safe to resume. During the pandemic, as many as 40 people would gather outside each Shabbat and meet in backyards, public spaces, parking lots, and a senior center bocce court.

The synagogue relocated in 2021 to a building on South Juniper Street in the same neighborhood. The community has continued to grow and organize community activities including hosting an annual public Hanukkah lighting, and in January 2026, an event showcasing the area's Jewish day school and after school education programs.

As of 2026, the Shtiebel attracts approximately 175 attendees for Saturday morning services. The synagogue does not have mandatory dues but receives donations from households and individuals at whatever level they may afford, as well as sponsorships for community meals and programs.

== See also ==
- History of the Jews in Pennsylvania
- List of synagogues in Pennsylvania
