= Walter George Smith School =

- U.S. National Register of Historic Places
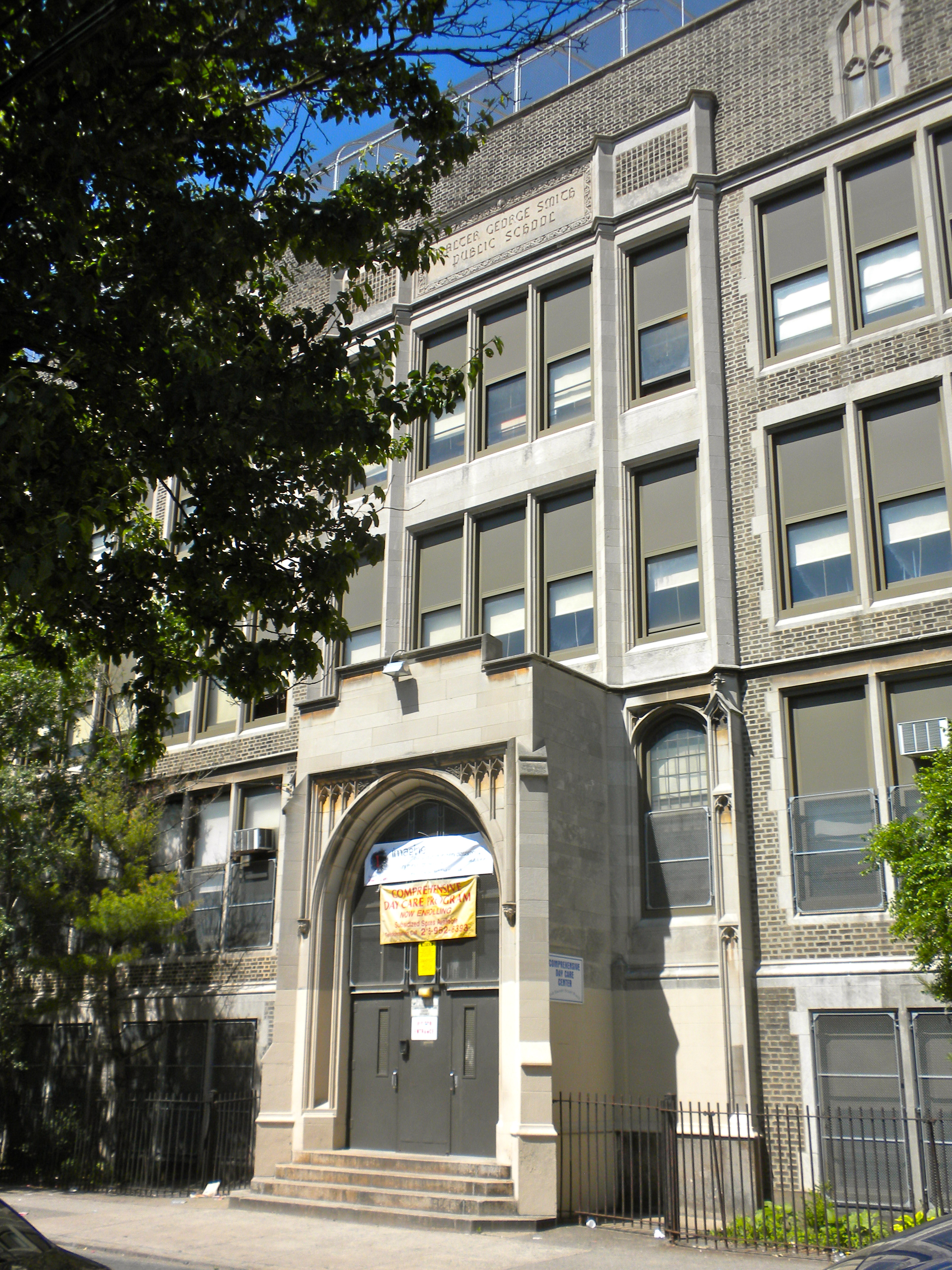
- Walter George Smith School, May 2010

- Location within Philadelphia Location within Pennsylvania Location within the United States
- Location: 1300 S. 19th St., Philadelphia, Pennsylvania
- Coordinates: 39.9349°N 75.1758°W
- Area: 2 acres (0.81 ha)
- Built: 1924–1925
- Architect: Irwin T. Catharine
- Architectural style: Late Gothic Revival, Academic Gothic
- MPS: Philadelphia Public Schools TR
- NRHP reference No.: 86003329
- Added to NRHP: December 4, 1986

The Walter George Smith School is a former school building that is located in the Point Breeze neighborhood of Philadelphia, Pennsylvania, United States.

It was added to the National Register of Historic Places in 1986. The school was closed in 2013; as of 2016, it was in the process of being converted to apartments.

== History and architectural features ==
Designed by Irwin T. Catharine and built between 1924 and 1925, this historic structure is a four-story, brick building with limestone trim that was created in the Late Gothic Revival style. It features two projecting ends, a main entrance with enclosed porch and Gothic arch, Gothic arched windows, and a battlement parapet.
