= George W. Childs School (former building) =

- U.S. National Register of Historic Places
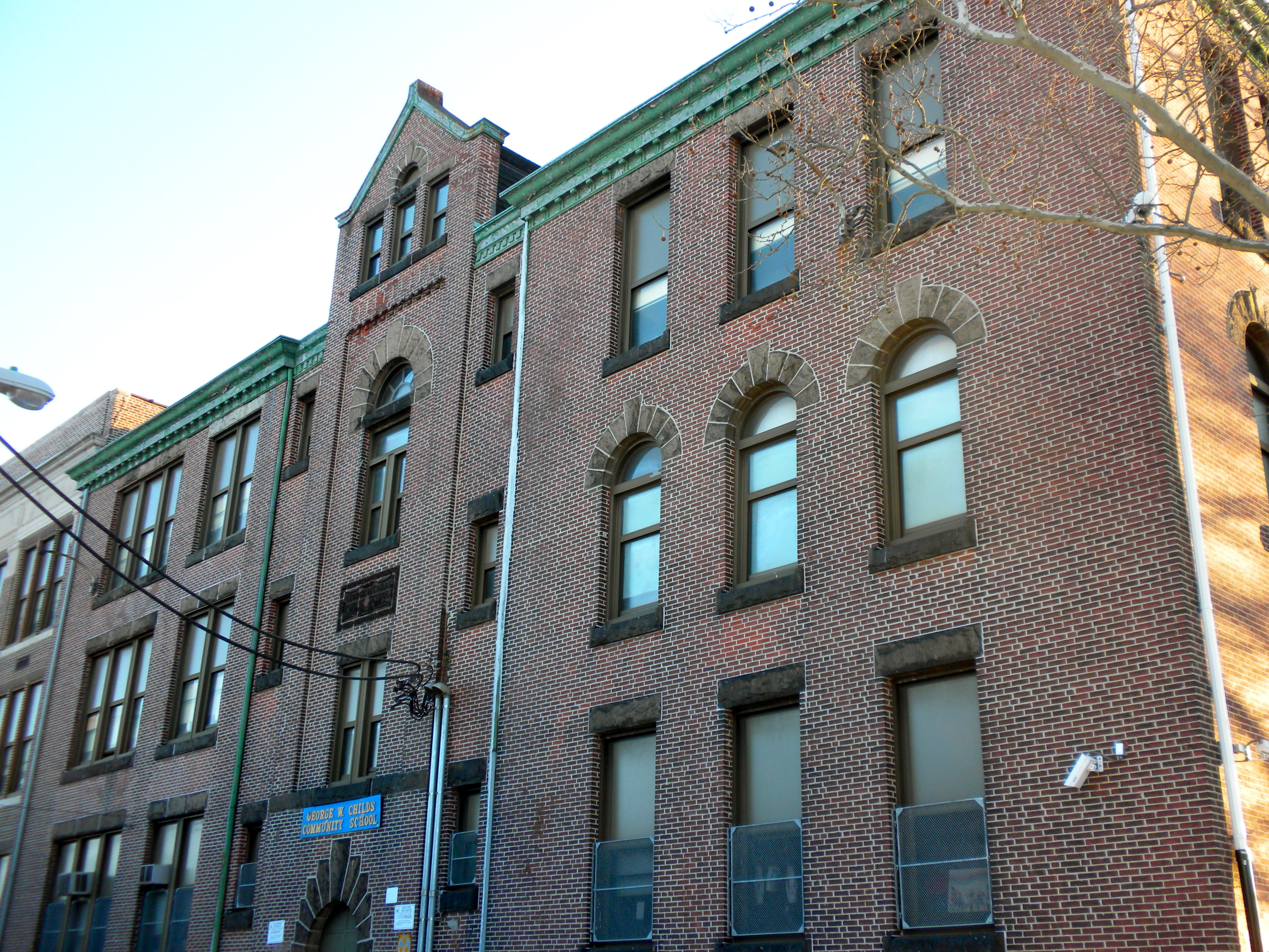
- George W. Childs School, February 2010

- Location within Philadelphia Location within Pennsylvania Location within the United States
- Location: 1501 S. 17th St., Philadelphia, Pennsylvania
- Coordinates: 39°55′53″N 75°10′22″W
- Area: 1.1 acres (0.45 ha)
- Built: 1893
- Built by: Johnson & Byrens
- Architect: Joseph W. Anschutz
- Architectural style: Classical Revival
- MPS: Philadelphia Public Schools TR
- NRHP reference No.: 88002257
- Added to NRHP: November 18, 1988

The George W. Childs School is a historic school building which is located in the Point Breeze neighborhood of Philadelphia, Pennsylvania. It was a facility of the School District of Philadelphia.

It was added to the National Register of Historic Places in 1988.

== History and architectural features ==
Built between 1893 and 1894, the George W. Childs School is a three-story, three-bay, brick building with brownstone trim, which was designed in the Classical Revival-style. A three-story, nine-bay yellow brick addition was subsequently erected in 1928, which features a stone arched entrance, Palladian window, and copper cornice.

It was added to the National Register of Historic Places in 1988.

In 2010, the school building was closed, and the school and students were moved several blocks north to the former Barratt Junior High School building.
