= G.W. Childs Elementary School =

- G.W. Childs Elementary School (listed in the NRHP as "Jeremiah Nichols School")
- U.S. National Register of Historic Places
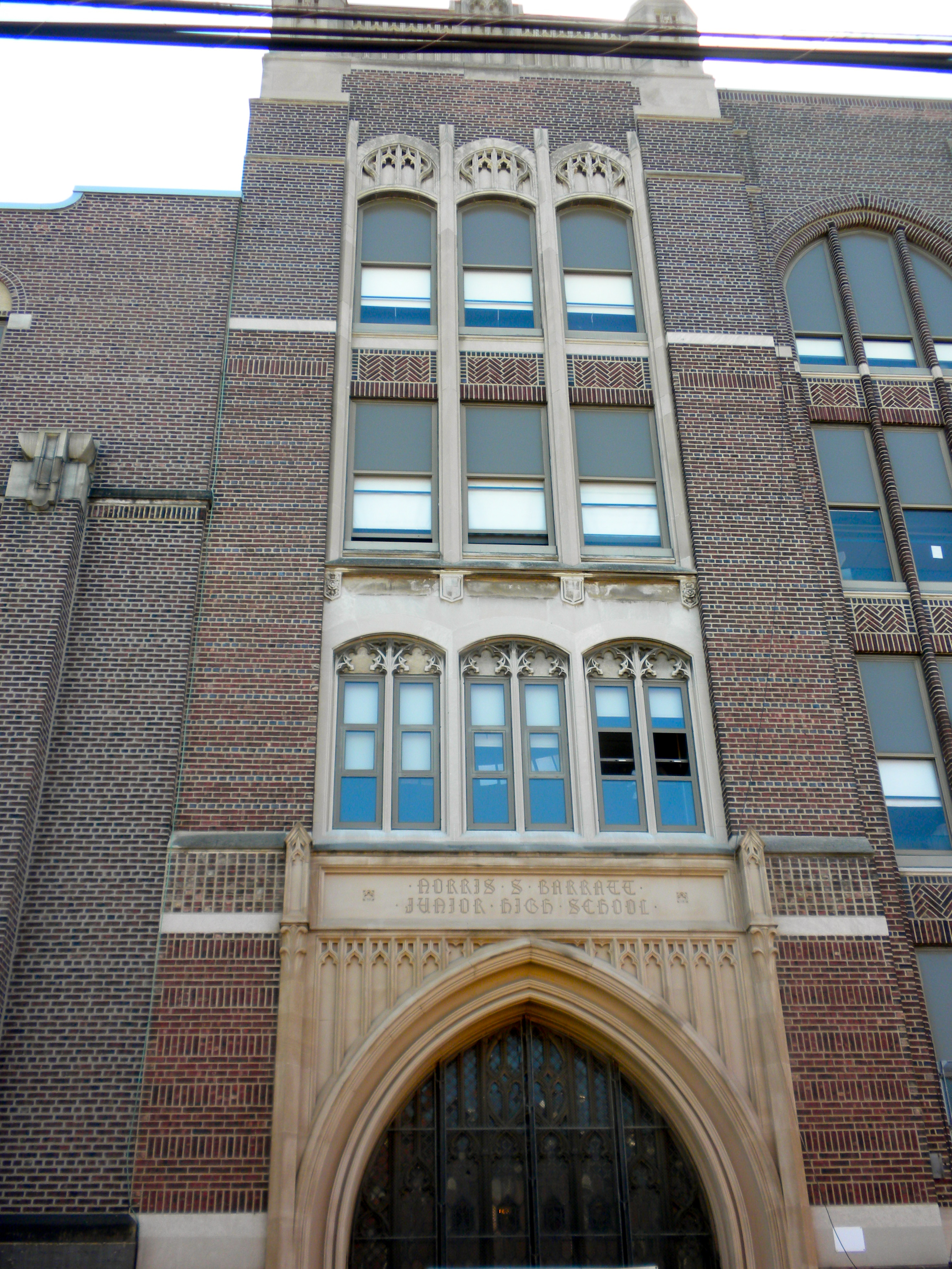
- Jeremiah Nichols School, May 2010

- Location within Philadelphia Location within Pennsylvania Location within the United States
- Location: 1599 Wharton St., Philadelphia, Pennsylvania
- Coordinates: 39°56′06″N 75°10′13″W
- Area: 1.8 acres (0.73 ha)
- Built: 1908
- Architects: Henry deCourcy Richards, Irwin T. Catharine
- Architectural style: Late Gothic Revival, Art Deco
- MPS: Philadelphia Public Schools TR
- NRHP reference No.: 88002241
- Added to NRHP: November 18, 1988

George W. Childs Elementary School is a K-8 school located in the Point Breeze neighborhood of Philadelphia, Pennsylvania. It is part of the School District of Philadelphia, and the historic building it occupies previously housed the Jeremiah Nichols School and Norris S. Barratt Junior High School.

The current school building was built in stages. The first building was designed by Henry deCourcy Richards in 1908. An expansion was built in 1926–1927 and was designed by Irwin T. Catharine. The Richards building is a three-story, three-bay, brick building on a raised basement in the Late Gothic Revival-style. The Catharine building is a four-story, seven-bay, brick building on a raised basement in the Art Deco-style.

The building was added to the National Register of Historic Places in 1988. In 2010, the previous Childs school building was closed, and students were moved to the current location. In 2013 Walter G. Smith Elementary School closed, with students redirected to Childs. Therefore, by December of that year the student body numbered 800.

On October 26, 1967, six months before he was assassinated Martin Luther King Jr. made his "What Is Your Life's Blueprint" Speech in the current G.W. Childs auditorium.
