= Newbold, Philadelphia =

Newbold (a sub-neighborhood within Point Breeze)
- Neighborhood of Philadelphia
- Location within Philadelphia
- Country: United States
- State: Pennsylvania
- County: Philadelphia
- City: Philadelphia
- ZIP Code: 19145, 19146
- Area code: Area code 215

Newbold is a fabricated neighborhood located in South Philadelphia, Pennsylvania, United States.

Developer John Longacre (owner of the South Philadelphia Taproom, American Sardine Bar, Brew, 2nd District, and Renewbold) dubbed this section of the Point Breeze neighborhood as "Newbold" in 2003. Longacre’s marketing tactic drew inspiration for the name from the original name of Hicks Street. Soon he formed the Newbold CDC and a civic association, which gave rise to other area civic groups.

== Boundaries ==
Newbold Civic Association (NCA), created in 2006, and Newbold Neighbors Association (NNA), now East Point Breeze Neighbors (EPBN), created in 2007, disputed north/south boundaries of the neighborhood and the separation of the section from the Point Breeze neighborhood. Both organizations considered Broad Street and 18th Street to be the east/west boundaries of the section. The Newbold Neighbors Association claimed the northern boundary of the area to be Washington Avenue and the southern boundary of the area to be Passyunk Avenue.

== Community ==
Civic groups active in the area include Newbold Civic Association, South Broad Street Neighborhood Association, Greater Philadelphia Community Alliance. Point Breeze Community Development Coalition, Point Breeze Network Plus, Neighbors in Action, and, Concerned Citizens of Point Breeze.

== Demographics ==
Based on a Zillow “Home Value Index”, a slideshow released in Nov. 2009 after the real estate market crash on CNBC has two Philly zip codes coming in at second and third place in the U.S. showing strong growth in Newbold during tough times.

Newbold is identified as the fourth "hottest" neighborhood in the Philadelphia region by Redfin.com with a 435% increase in interest in the neighborhood and a $155,750 median home sale price.

== Transportation ==
Newbold is served by the SEPTA Broad Street Line (BSL), accessible at the Snyder, Tasker-Morris, and Ellsworth-Federal Stations, as well as several bus lines.

== Namesakes ==
Newbold IPA, a beer released in 2008 by Philadelphia Brewing Company was named after the neighborhood.

== See also ==
- Point Breeze
- South Philadelphia
- Gentrification
