= Universal Vare Charter School =

- Edwin H. Vare Junior High School
- U.S. National Register of Historic Places
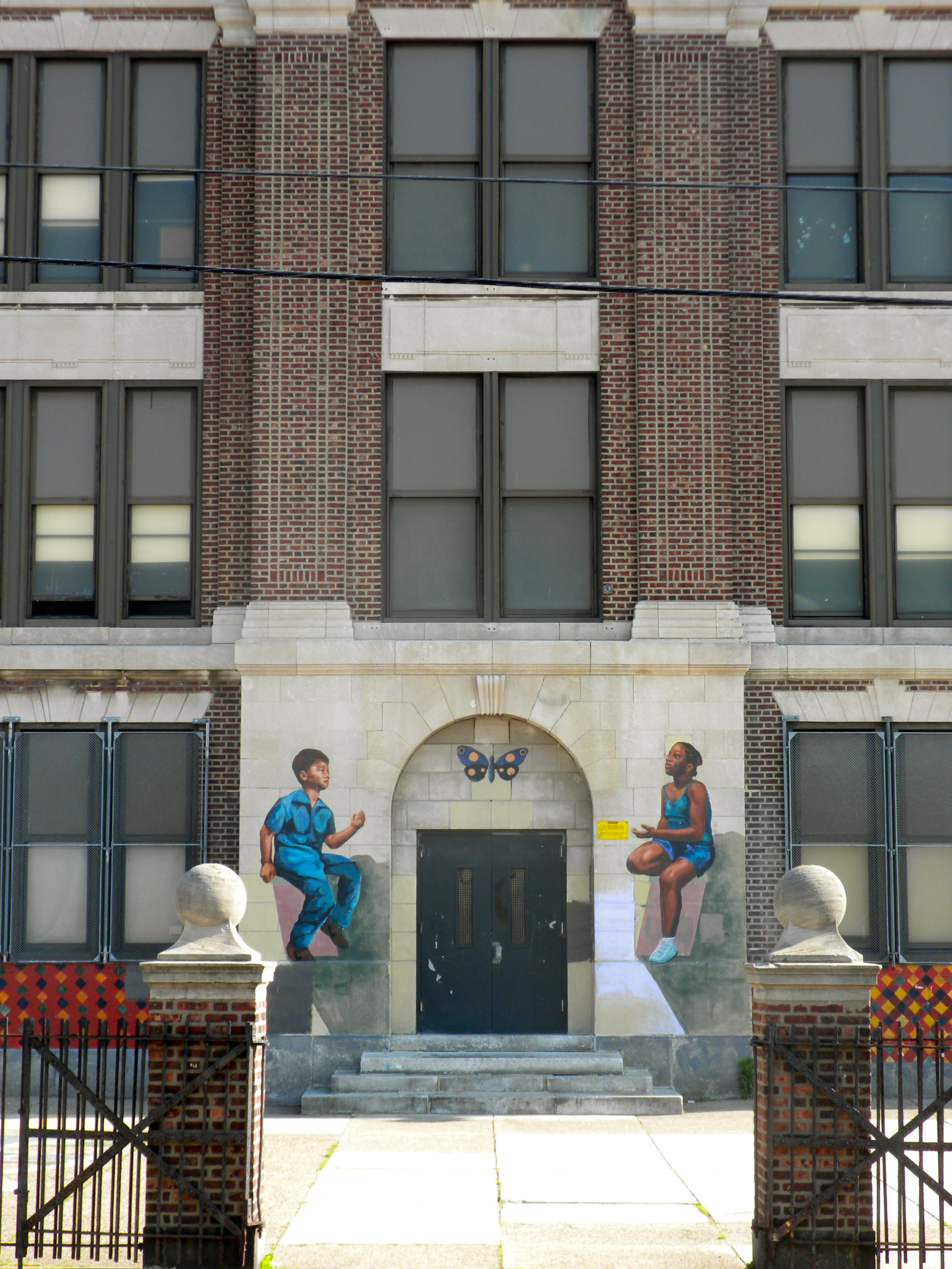
- Edwin H. Vare Junior High School entrance, May 2010

- Location within Philadelphia Location within Pennsylvania Location within the United States
- Location: 2100 S. 24th St., Philadelphia, Pennsylvania, United States
- Coordinates: 39°55′33″N 75°11′09″W
- Area: 4 acres (1.6 ha)
- Built: 1922–1924
- Architect: Irwin T. Catharine
- Architectural style: Colonial Revival
- MPS: Philadelphia Public Schools TR
- NRHP reference No.: 88002331
- Added to NRHP: November 18, 1988

The Universal Vare Charter School, formerly the Edwin H. Vare Junior High School, and Edwin H. Vare Middle School, is a historic junior high school building located in the Wilson Park neighborhood of Philadelphia, Pennsylvania, United States. It is currently a charter school run by Universal Family of Schools.

This building was added to the National Register of Historic Places in 1988.

== History and architectural features ==
This historic building was designed by Irwin T. Catharine and built between 1922 and 1924. It is a three-story, seventeen-bay, brick building that sits on a raised basement, Created in the Colonial Revival style, and built in the shape of a shallow "W," it features an entrance pavilion with arched openings, pilasters, and a brick parapet.

The building was added to the National Register of Historic Places in 1988.

Due to asbestos issues, the Edwin Vare building is no longer used effective April 2023, and for the 2023-2024 school year, the school instead used the McDaniel Annex Building; this is not the same building as the Delaplaine McDaniel School. As of 2024, The Building is slated to be demolished after the 2024-2025 school year.
