= Girard Estate, Philadelphia =

Neighborhood in Philadelphia, US

Girard Estate
- Neighborhood of Philadelphia
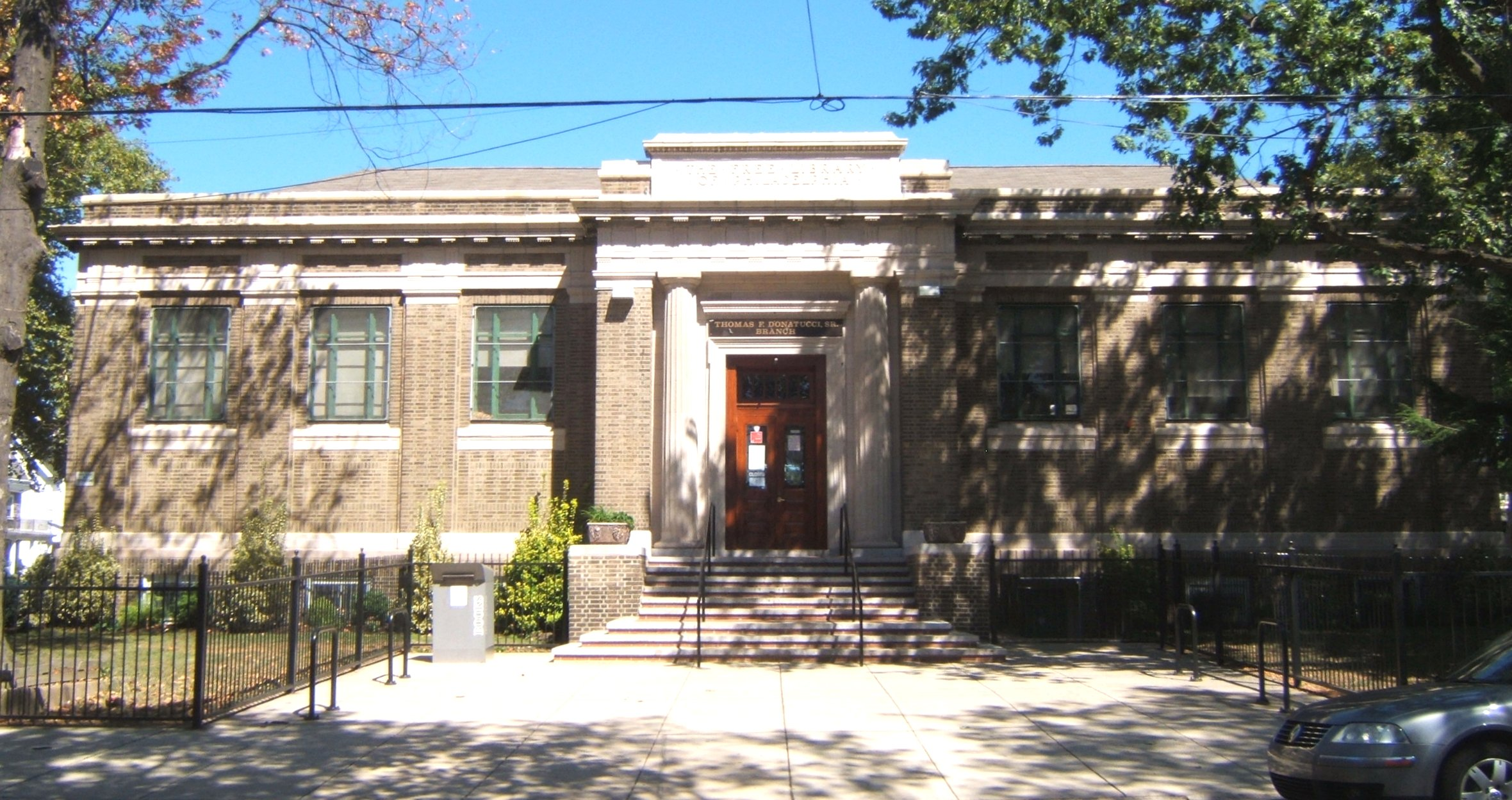
- Donatucci Branch of the Free Library of Philadelphia

- Location within Philadelphia
- Country: United States
- State: Pennsylvania
- County: Philadelphia
- City: Philadelphia
- Area codes: 215, 267, and 445

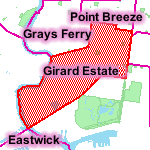

Girard Estate, also known as Girard Estates, is part of South Philadelphia, Pennsylvania, United States. Its boundaries stretch from South 22nd Street on the west to South 17th Street on the east. The southern boundary is clearly defined as the south side of Shunk Street, but its northern boundary is irregular in stretching from the north side of Porter Street between South 17th Street and South 21st Streets, along the east side of South 21st Street to West Passyunk Avenue, then along the south side of West Passyunk Avenue to its northwestern tip at South 22nd Street. It is named after Stephen Girard, whose South Philadelphia property was developed in the 1920s by the City of Philadelphia.

== History ==
Girard's country home was on a plot of land he named Gentilhommiere in what was formerly called Passyunk Township of Philadelphia County. He was likely the richest man in the United States when he died in 1831, and he left most of his $6 million estate to the City of Philadelphia.

Girard's will stated that the city must establish a school for poor orphaned white boys in his name, and that Gentilhommiere must not be sold. To meet the second stipulation, the Board of City Trusts, trustee of the Girard Estate, developed 481 rental homes which became the Girard Estate homes.

Most of the semi-detached homes were designed by architects John and James H. Windrim, and were built from 1906 to 1916. The architectural styles included Bungalow, Prairie, Mission, Jacobean Revival and Colonial Revival. They are a marked difference from the typical South Philly row homes.

In 1950, the city received permission to sell all 481 homes to private owners. All the homes were sold within two years.

In 1979, Girard Estate became a location for "Rocky II." The crew filmed scenes on the 2300 block of S. Lambert Street for a week. In the film, the character Rocky Balboa bought 2313 S. Lambert St. with his winnings from the bout in the first film. (He even comments on the address, pointing out that the number "almost add up to nine!") All exteriors were shot on the street; house interiors were shot on a soundstage.

On March 15, 1981, Philadelphia organized crime boss Phillip Testa returned to his Girard Estates twin home at 2117 Porter Street and as he was opening the door a nail bomb exploded under his front porch killing him and doing extensive damage the house.

The Philadelphia Quartermaster Depot and Edgar Allan Poe School are listed on the National Register of Historic Places.

== Education ==
The School District of Philadelphia operates public schools.

The Free Library of Philadelphia Thomas F. Donatucci, Sr. Branch (formerly the Passyunk Branch) serves Girard Estate. The library received its current name in 2004.

== Notable people ==
- Stephen Girard (1750-1831), philanthropist, banker, and slave owner
- Pat Martino (1944-2021), jazz musician
- Philip Testa (1924-1981), mobster
