= David Landreth School =

- U.S. National Register of Historic Places
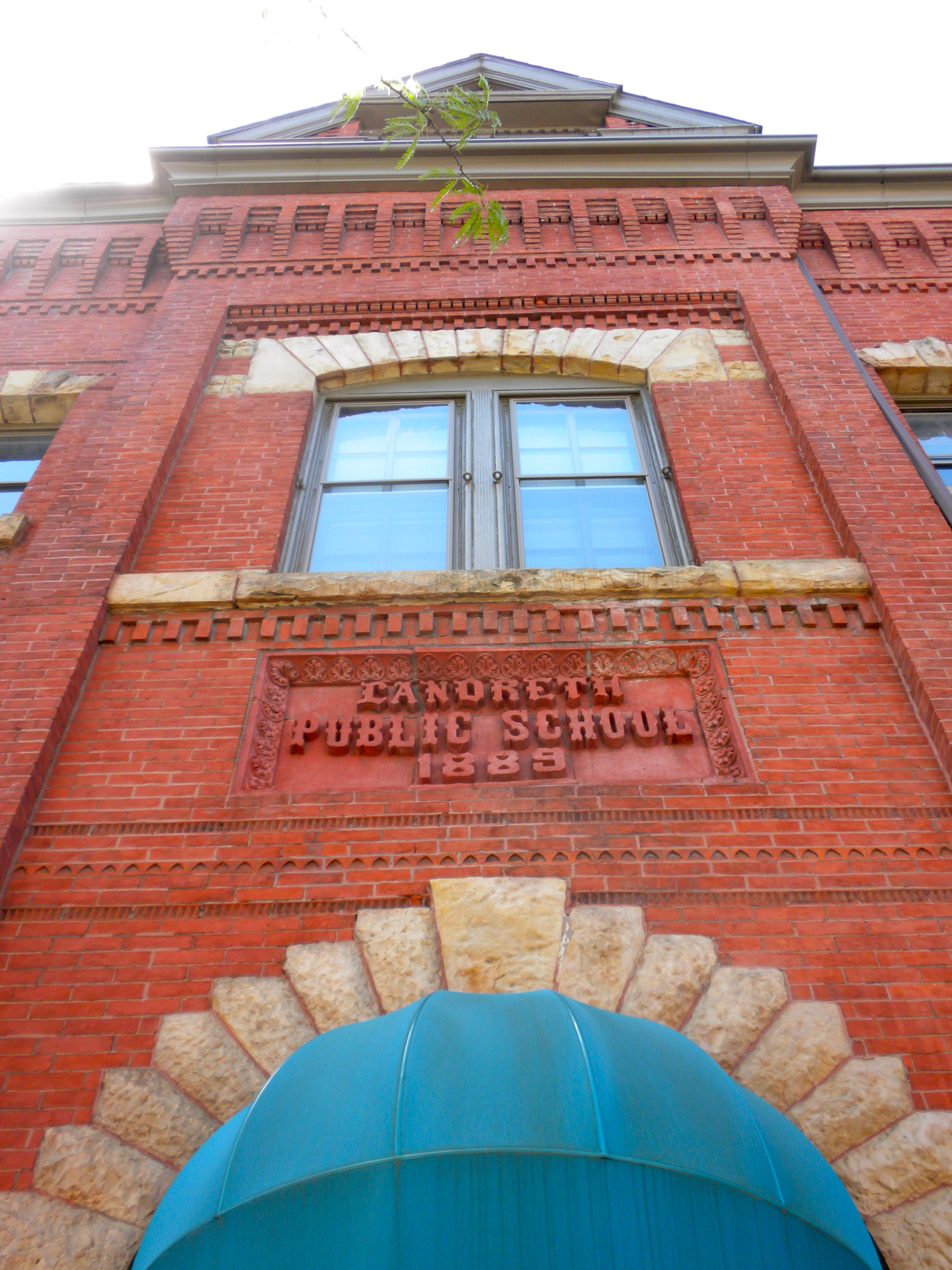
- David Landreth School, May 2010

- Location within Philadelphia Location within Pennsylvania Location within the United States
- Location: 1201 S. Twenty-third St., Philadelphia, Pennsylvania
- Coordinates: 39°56′16″N 75°10′54″W
- Area: 1 acre (0.40 ha)
- Built: 1889
- Built by: Charles McCaul
- Architect: Joseph W. Anshutz
- Architectural style: Gothic
- MPS: Philadelphia Public Schools TR
- NRHP reference No.: 86003299
- Added to NRHP: December 4, 1986

David Landreth School is a historic school building located in the Point Breeze neighborhood of Philadelphia, Pennsylvania. It was built in 1889 after the original school caught fire (it had been on the nursery grounds of the D. Landreth Seed Company).

It is a two-story, three-bay, brick building with a stone foundation in the Gothic Revival style. A three-story, nine-bay, yellow brick addition was built in 1928. It features a large corbelled brick cornice, sandstone sills and lintels, and three large brick chimneys with corbelled caps. The school was named after the founder of the D. Landreth Seed Company.

The building was added to the National Register of Historic Places in 1986.

The Queen Memorial Branch of the Philadelphia Public Library opened in its current location within the Landreth School building on Tuesday, January 17, 1995 in the Landreth Apartments, a residence for seniors that occupies the former school. Mamie Nichols, then Executive Director of the Point Breeze Federation, was a prime leader behind the renovation of the school into a "multi-purpose achievement center."
