= D. Landreth Seed Company =

American seed company

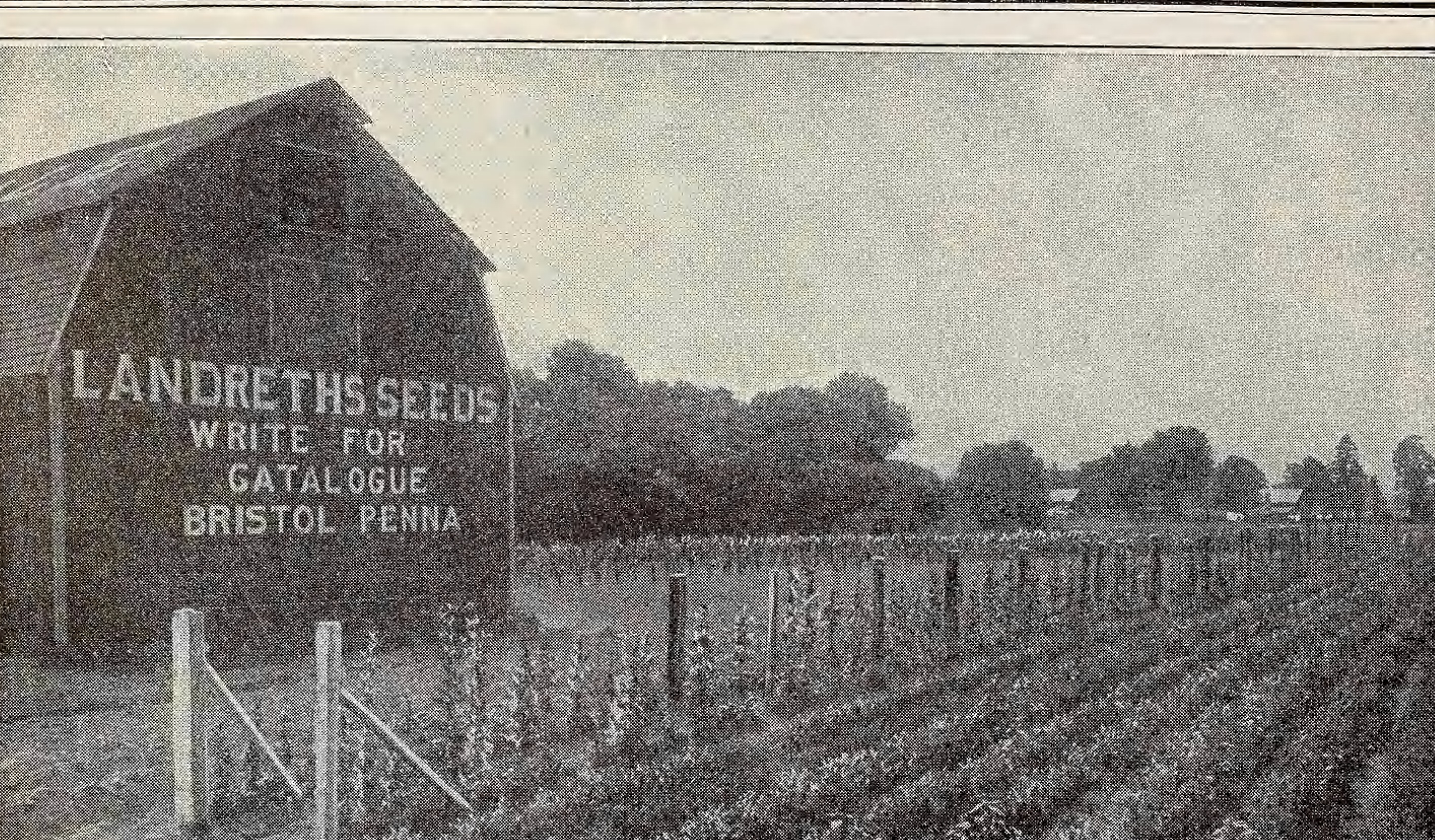
- Bloomsdale Farms, 1914
- Founded: Philadelphia, Pennsylvania, United States (1784)
- Founder: David Landreth
- Headquarters: Shelburne, Vermont, United States
- Products: Seeds
- Website: landrethseed.com

The D. Landreth Seed Company is an American seed company founded in 1784 by David and Cuthbert Landreth in Philadelphia, Pennsylvania.

== History ==
David Landreth was born in 1752 in Northumberland, England. In 1780, Landreth immigrated with his family to Montreal, Canada, to establish a seed company. The harsh Canadian climate forced him to relocate to Philadelphia in 1783. In 1786, he partnered with his brother Cuthbert to run the business in Philadelphia.

At first, he sold seeds to the city of Philadelphia and nearby estates. Over time his business grew, and George Washington, Thomas Jefferson, and Joseph Bonaparte were among his customers when they visited the city during the Constitutional Convention in 1787. In 1818, a store was founded in Charleston, South Carolina, and a second in St. Louis in 1854, which later closed at the start of the Civil War. Landreth and his son David, who joined the company in 1820, were among the founders of the Pennsylvania Horticultural Society in 1827 and produced the first agricultural journal in the United States, Floral Magazine, in 1832.

In 1845 the Landreth family granted a parcel of land to the city of Philadelphia for the building of a public school named the Landreth School, later expanded to 23rd and Federal Streets. D. Landreth and Sons moved to Bloomsdale Farms to test seeds on 600 acres in Bristol, Pennsylvania, in 1847, where the company continued to grow. Seeds were distributed nationally and internationally to the West Indies, South Africa, India, China, and Japan. In 1852, Landreth's supplied seeds for Commander Matthew C. Perry trip to Japan as gifts. Upon Perry's return in 1855, Landreth received the first major importation of Japanese seeds into the United States for cultivation and distribution, including the red shiso and wineberries.

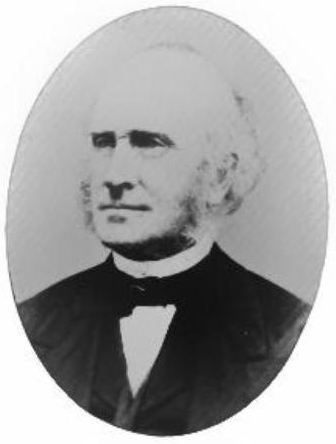
David Landreth II (1802–1880)

In 1880, David Landreth II died, and his sons Oliver, Burnet (1869–1941), and Leopold took over the business. In 1904, the company changed names to D. Landreth Seed Company and was headed by Landreth's great-grandsons.

In 1942, it was sold to the Buist Seed Co. of Philadelphia. During World War II, the US government condemned much of Bloomsdale Farms for defense contractors and housing. Suburban sprawl took care of the balance of the farm. The company was sold to the Goldberg Co., which moved it to Baltimore until 2006.

In 2003, venture capitalist Barbara Melera purchased the company and became its president to save it from closure. In 2010, the company began turning a profit, and customers increased to 4,000 from 350 after a growing interest in heirloom seeds. After using a combination of her personal finances and loans to finance the company, she was later sued by creditors in 2012.

In 2016, the company was listed for auction and was acquired by American Meadows, Inc.

== Products ==
The introduction of the company's creative plant breeding placed them at the forefront of modern cooking preferences. The company introduced the zinnia in 1789, the first truly white potato in 1811, and the tomato in 1820 to the United States.

== Catalog ==
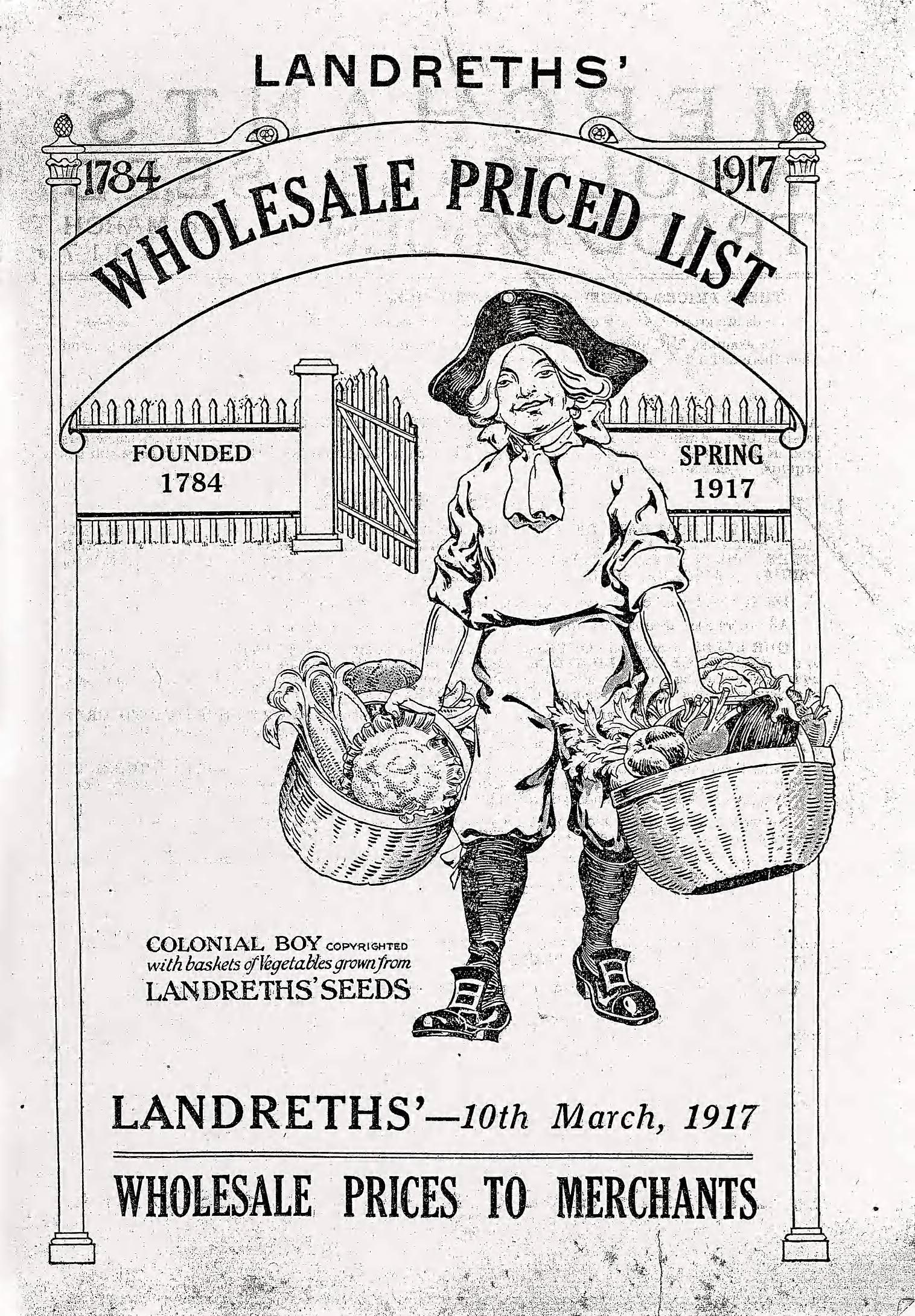
D. Landreth Seed Company catalog, 1917

Catalogs featured the D. Landreth Seed Company's test fields touting that seeds were fresh because they were grown themselves, any unsold stock at the end of the planting season was burned, and seed packages were labeled with dates ensuring seed viability. After the Civil War, the company began associating itself with nationalism using slogans such as "American seeds for the American climate" and "preeminently the AMERICAN SEED HOUSE" as well as employing the Liberty Bell in its logo. In 1881, they took advantage of the new federal trademark law, trademarking the logo and brand names. The catalogs featured illustrative woodcuts until the 1890s, when the company became one of the first to introduce photography to show how the plants appeared in real life.

In 2010, Michael W. Twitty worked with the company to compile the African American Heritage Collection of heirloom seeds for the company's 225th anniversary. The collection features roughly 30 plants, including the long-handled dipper gourd and the fish pepper, showcasing how instrumental they were to African-American survival and independence.
