= Girard Academic Music Program =

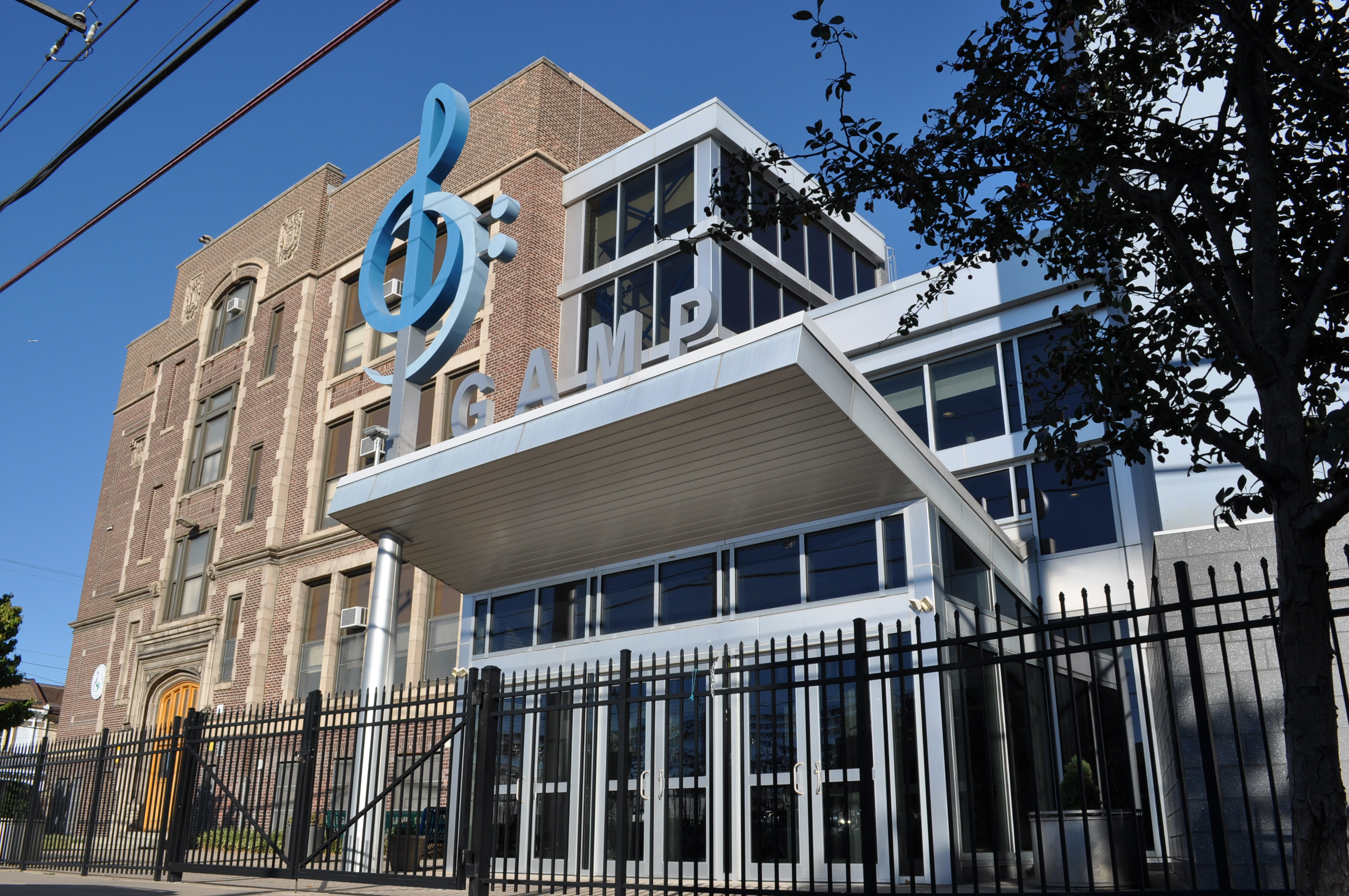
- GAMP Main Entrance

Location
- 2136 W. Ritner Street; Philadelphia, Pennsylvania 19145; United States; 39°55′20″N 75°11′00″W

Information
- Type: Public
- Established: 1974
- Founder: Jack Carr
- School district: The School District of Philadelphia
- Principal: Thomas Emerson
- Grades: 5-12
- Campus type: urban
- Colors: Kelly Green & Blue
- Mascot: The Pioneers
- Website: gamp.philasd.org
- Edgar Allan Poe School
- U.S. National Register of Historic Places
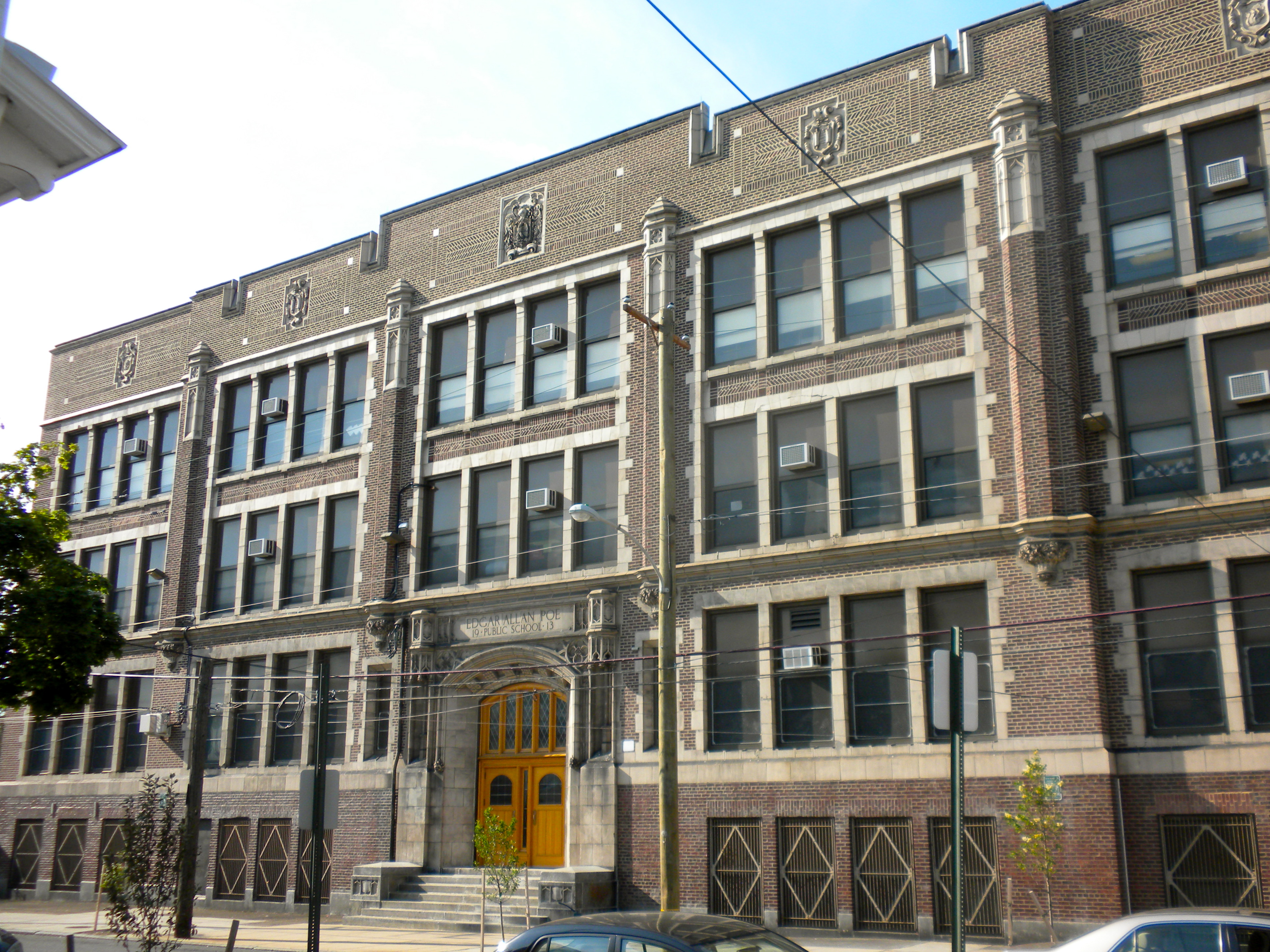
- Edgar Allan Poe School, May 2010
- Location: 2136 Ritner St., Philadelphia, Pennsylvania
- Area: 1 acre (0.40 ha)
- Built: 1913–1914
- Built by: Charles McCaul Co.
- Architect: Henry deCoursey Richards
- Architectural style: Tudor Revival, Jacobean
- MPS: Philadelphia Public Schools TR
- NRHP reference No.: 86003318
- Added to NRHP: December 4, 1986

The Girard Academic Music Program (GAMP) is a public magnet secondary school in Philadelphia and is part of the School District of Philadelphia. Students at the school are in grades 5 to 12 and have the option to pursue music as a major subject area.

== History ==
The Girard Academic Music Program began operation in September 1974 as an alternative program within the Stephen Girard School at 18th and Snyder Avenue. It began with one 4th and one 5th grade class of approximately 55 students, 2 academic teachers, a teacher's aide, and a music teacher/coordinator. The school has found academic and musical success. It has been based in several places. From its inception until 1976, it was located in the Trinity Church Parish House at 18th & Wolf Streets). In 1976, it moved to the Armory, now owned by St. Rita's Church, located at Broad and Wharton Streets.

Since 1979, the school has been located in the former Edgar Allan Poe School at 22nd & Ritner Streets, in the Girard Estate neighborhood of Philadelphia. The building was designed by Henry deCoursey Richards and built in 1913–1914. It is a four-story, five-bay, brick and limestone building on a raised basement in the Tudor Revival-style. It features a three-bay, projecting center section with an arched limestone entrance, decorative panels, and a parapet with battlement cuts. It was named for author Edgar Allan Poe. The Poe school was added to the National Register of Historic Places in 1986.

Established as one of Philadelphia's initial Small Learning Communities, GAMP serves over 600 students in grades 5 through 12 with a staff of 30. The school requires al enrolled students to major in music while maintaining a core academic curriculum. Graduating classes report college acceptance rates between 97% and 100%, with graduating seniors annually securing $1 million to $2 million in higher education scholarships.

== Music studies ==
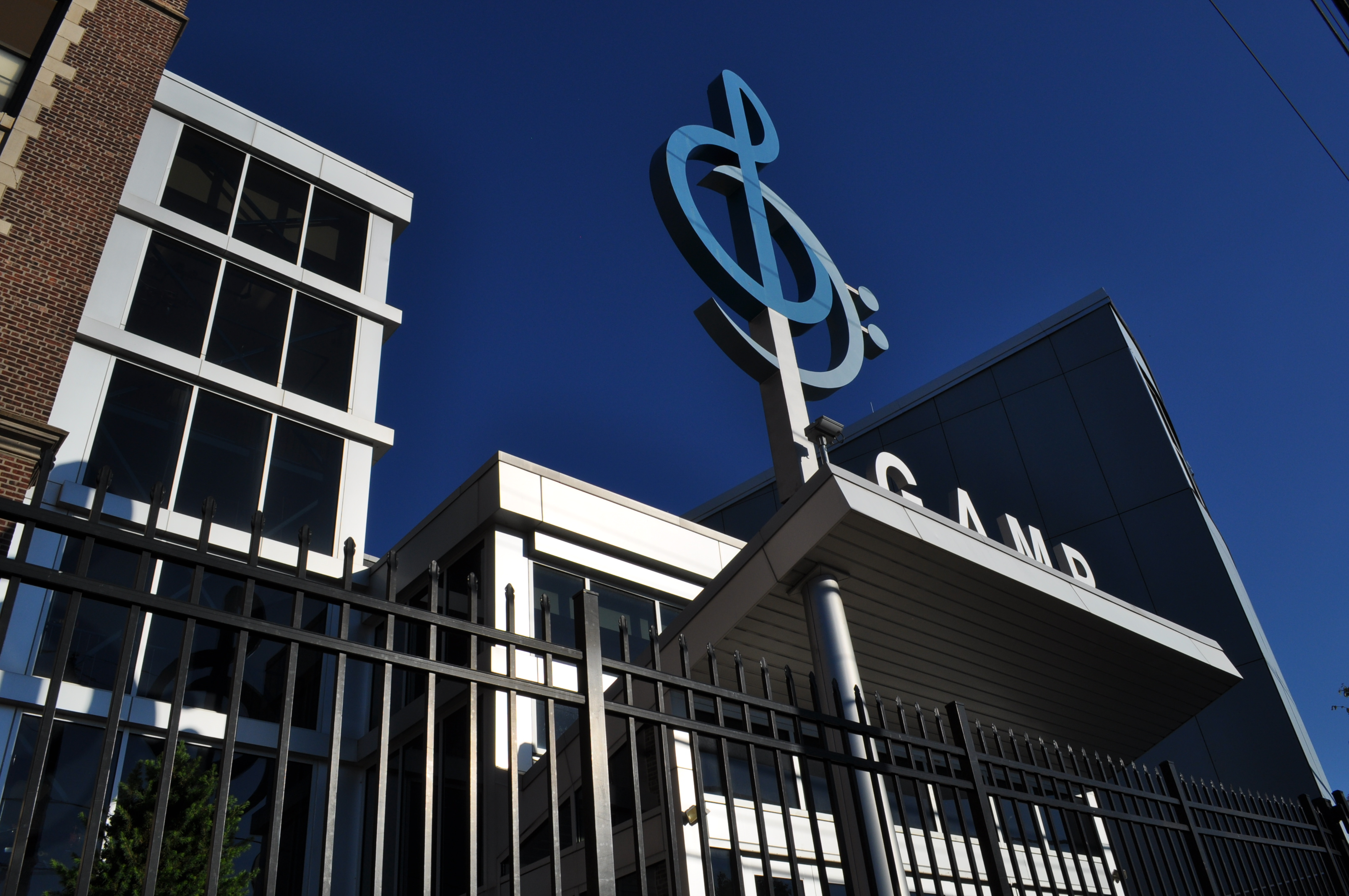
GAMP Clef Musical Symbol

In addition to a rigorous, college-preparatory curriculum, students are required to enroll in several music courses every year, and may choose additional classes or ensembles to further develop their musicianship. All students at GAMP participate in general choir, which is organized by grade groups: 5th and 6th grade, 7th and 8th grade, and 9th to 12th grade. The concert choir is an auditioned group which performs the most advanced repertoire and travels for various performances throughout the school year. The concert choir has performed for President Bill Clinton and President Barack Obama, the Philadelphia Phillies, Governor Ed Rendell, Mayor John Street and Mayor Michael Nutter, at the inauguration for Mayor Jim Kenney, for the Philadelphia Eagles for Super Bowl LIX, and alongside Idina Menzel, who has earned a Grammy Award.

Some students have two or three periods of music theory classes each week. In theory class, students lean the basic building blocks of music, including sight singing, rhythm performance, dictation, written theory, composition, and functional piano skills. Advanced Placement music theory courses are offered for 11th and 12th grade students.

The instrumental music department consists of a variety of ensembles for both middle and high school students, including string orchestra, concert band, jazz band, swing band, symphonic band, wind ensemble, chamber orchestra, and marching band. Students enrolled in instrumental music are provided weekly group lessons for their instrument. Ensembles have performed at a diverse number of locations and events including the Philadelphia Museum of Art, Side by Side with the Philadelphia Orchestra, the Rittenhouse Square Flower Show, the Warwick Hotel, and the marching band in the annual Philadelphia Columbus Day Parade.

== Sports ==
The school has cross country, tennis, basketball, softball, and cheerleading. Additionally, students may participate in other sports including baseball, football, and volleyball through a partnership with South Philadelphia High School. The GAMP mascot is the Pioneer.
