= Molly Landreth =

Molly Landreth is an American freelance photographer and artist born in Washington.

Her large-format portraits address topics such as gender and sexuality in the LGBT community. She began documenting the queer community in 2004, hoping to redefine the narrative of sexuality within relationships in the community. She is currently working on an eight-year-long photography project called the Embodiment Project which focuses on her photography along with personal statements regarding her work.

She has been awarded several grants, including the Individual Artist Projects Grant from 4Culture, the Humble Arts Foundation Grant, and the Artist Projects Grant from Artist Trust in 2008.

== Works ==
- Embodiment, 2004
- Queer Brighton
- Landscapes
- Tearsheets
