= East Passyunk Crossing, Philadelphia =

Neighborhood in Philadelphia, US

East Passyunk Crossing
- Neighborhood of Philadelphia
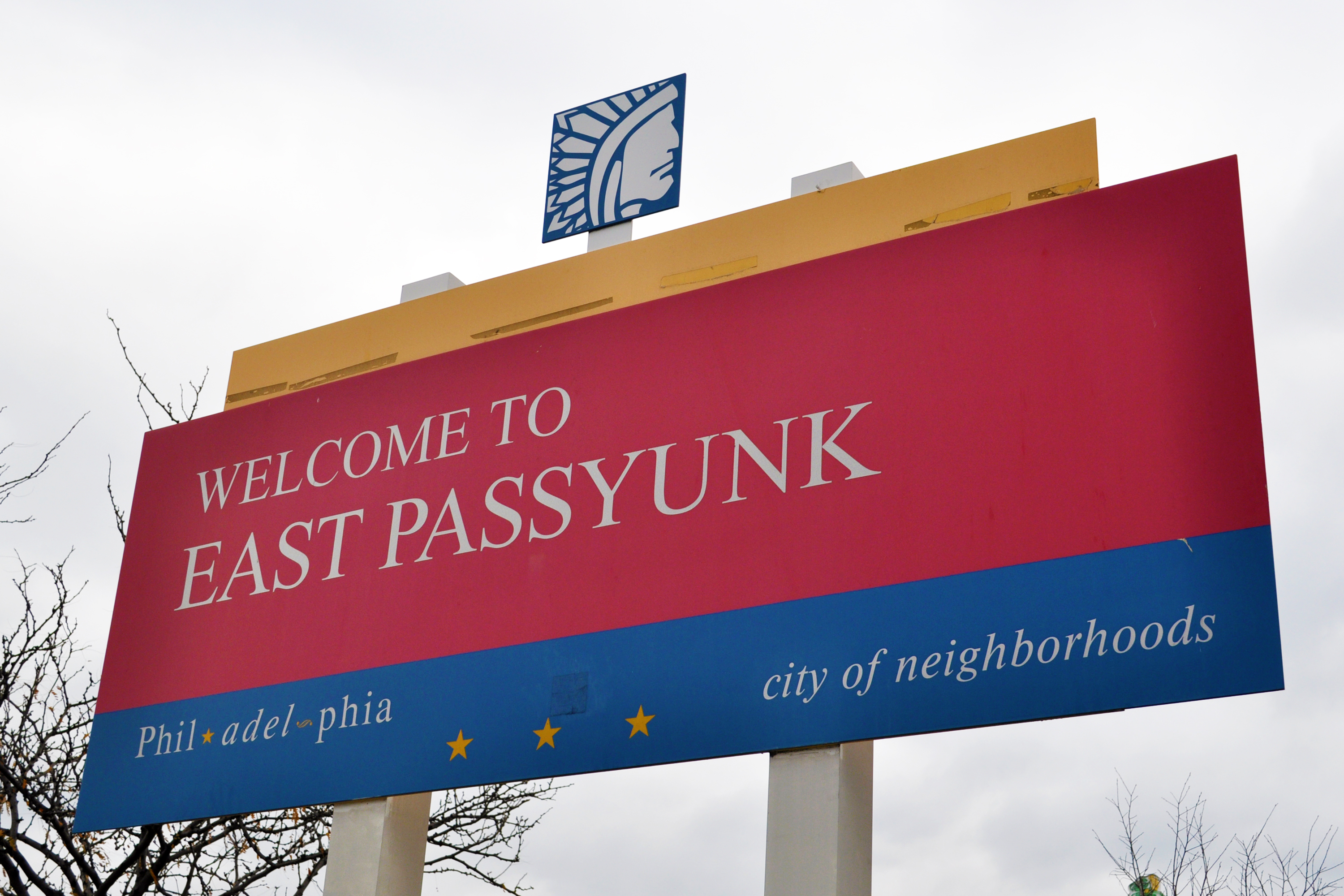
- Gateway Plaza East Passyunk Welcome Sign

- Location within Philadelphia
- Country: United States
- State: Pennsylvania
- County: Philadelphia
- City: Philadelphia
- ZIP code: 19148
- Area codes: 215, 267, and 445

East Passyunk Crossing is a neighborhood in South Philadelphia, Pennsylvania, United States. Its location is considered to be from Tasker Street to Snyder Avenue and Broad Street to 6th Street.

The address range of southbound and northbound streets is 1600 to 2099, and of eastbound and westbound streets it is 600 to 1399.

The name and boundaries of East Passyunk Crossing originated when the East Passyunk Crossing Civic Association (EPX), a Registered Community Organization of the City of Philadelphia, was formed. The neighborhood is bounded by the neighborhoods of Newbold to its west, Passyunk Square to its north, Dickinson Square West and Greenwich to its east, and Lower Moyamensing to its south.

== Demographics ==
The neighborhood has a population of over 12,000 residents, with the majority being homeowners, and the median age is about 35. The rowhouse is the primary type of home construction, most built over 100 years ago.

The increasing LGBTQ population in the area, along with LGBTQ-owned or friendly businesses in the area has led some to name the area the "New Gayborhood". Joseph F. Marino, co-chair of the East Passyunk Crossing Civic Association and Town Watch said, "When I was a boy, there were maybe three gay men in the neighborhood. Now there are three on every block."

== Shopping district ==
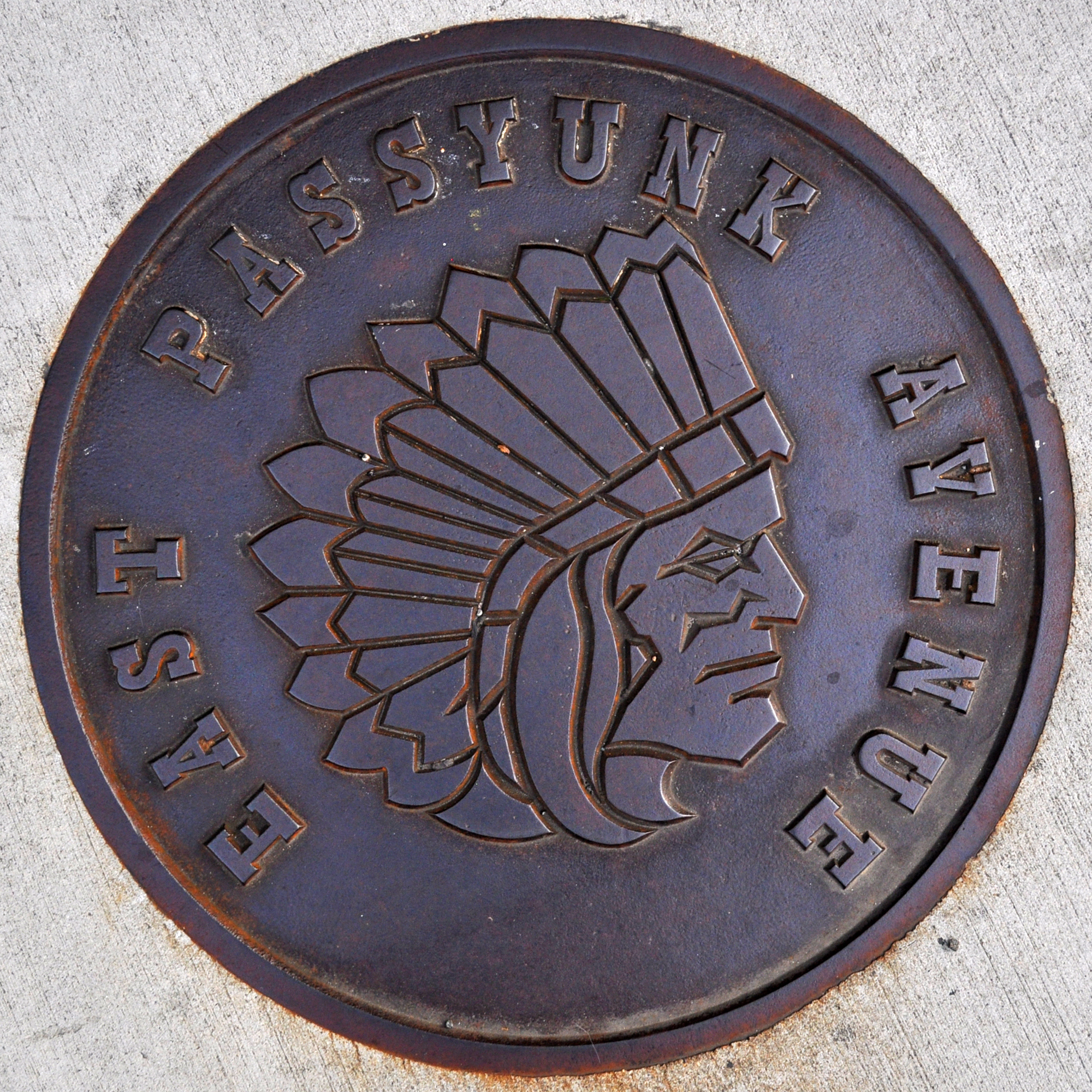
East Passyunk Avenue Sidewalk Medallion

The East Passyunk Avenue Shopping District encompasses over 150 independently owned businesses, including many restaurants, along Passyunk Avenue from 9th to Broad Streets.

The City of Philadelphia designated Passyunk Avenue from the south side of Federal Street to the east side of Broad Street as the East Passyunk Avenue Business Improvement District and collects levies from the approximately 300 commercial properties there in order to promote the Avenue, for sidewalk sweeping and beautification, for economic development, and for personnel and general operation expenses.

The Passyunk Avenue Revitalization Corporation, a non-profit real estate development and management company, owns and leases many properties and maintains the public space along the East Passyunk Avenue corridor.

Regularly spaced along the sidewalks of East Passyunk Avenue, from Broad to Tasker Streets, are embedded 88 cast iron medallions, 30 inches (76 cm) round, displaying the name East Passyunk Avenue and the face and headdress of an indigenous person. The logo has been used in promotional materials for the shopping district since around the turn of the 21st century. The design was called out in 2018 for its "casual racism" and inaccurate portrayal of the headdress worn by the Lenni-Lenape people who lived in the area, and in October 2020 the East Passyunk Avenue Business Improvement District began the process to replace the logo.

== Major landmarks ==
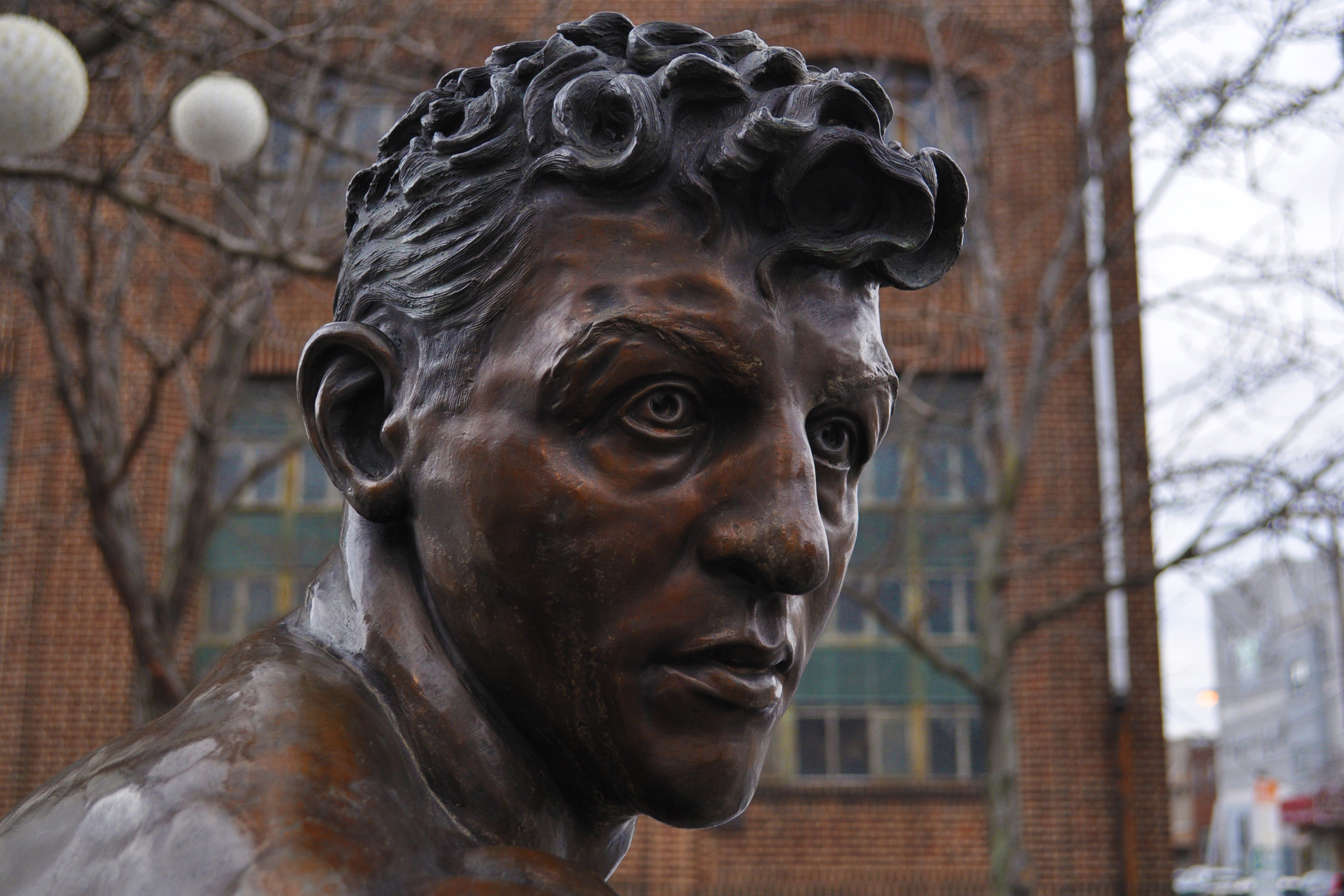
East Passyunk Crossing statue honoring former boxing middleweight champion Joey Giardello

The East Passyunk Gateway Park is a landscaped triangle bounded by Passyunk Avenue, McKean and Broad Streets, located at the traffic entrance to the East Passyunk Avenue shopping district.

The Joey Giardello Statue park, situated in the triangle formed by Passyunk Avenue, Mifflin and 13th Streets, is a tree covered relaxation space with tables and benches. It features a statue, installed May 21, 2011, honoring the 1963 world middleweight boxing champion Joey Giardello.

The History of Italian Immigration Museum, 1834 East Passyunk Avenue, celebrates Italian-Americans represented throughout U.S. society, the Supreme Court, sports, show business, politics, science, art, and music.

On the northwestern border of the neighborhood can be found The Singing Fountain, situated in the triangle formed by Passyunk Avenue, Tasker and 11th Streets. Besides being a popular relaxation spot, with tables and benches, and hidden speakers that play music, it is used by the Shopping District for planned events throughout the year. During warmer months the triangle hosts a Farmers Market every Wednesday afternoon.

The Free Blockbuster Box is located outside of South Fellini 1507 E. Passyunk Avenue, a public movie exchange where people can take or leave a DVD, VHS or Betamax.

== Education ==
=== Schools ===
- Saints John Neumann and Maria Goretti Catholic High School, a Roman Catholic high school for 9th to 12th grade, 1736 South 10th Street.
- Southwark School, a Philadelphia Public School for Pre-K to 8th grade, 1835 S. 9th St.
- St. Anthony of Padua Regional Catholic School, for Pre-K to 8th grade, 913 Pierce Street.

=== Public libraries ===
The Free Library of Philadelphia's South Philadelphia Library branch, at 1700 South Broad Street, serves this neighborhood.

== Recreation and community centers ==
- East Passyunk Community Recreation Center, 1025 Mifflin Street
- United Communities Houston Center, 2029 South 8th Street
- James Otis Ford Playground and Recreation Center, 631 Snyder Avenue

== Postal facility ==
The United States Postal Service operates its Castle Branch at 1713 South Broad Street.

== Public transit ==
SEPTA stations of the Broad Street Subway are located at Tasker-Morris (with entrances on both Tasker Street and Morris Street) and Snyder Avenue. It also operates several bus routes:

- Broad Street Route 4, northbound and southbound
- 12th Street Route 45, southbound
- 11th Street Route 45, northbound
- 9th Street Route 47M, northbound
- 8th Street Routes 47 and 47M, southbound
- 7th Street Route 47, northbound
- Snyder Avenue Route 79, eastbound and westbound
- Morris Street Route 29, eastbound
- Tasker Street Route 29, westbound

== Houses of worship ==
- St. Nicholas of Tolentine Roman Catholic Church
- St. John's Baptist Church
- Indonesian Light Church Philadelphia
- International Bethel Church
- Bethany Indonesian Church of God
- Abundant Life Chinese Church
- Prophetic Church of Christ
- First Christian Assembly
- Abundant Harvest House of Prayer
- Little David Baptist Church
- St. George Coptic Orthodox Center
- Indonesian Full Gospel Fellowship Church
- South Philadelphia Shtiebel
- Zhen Ru Temple Zhen Buddhist temple
- Iglesia De Cristo Misionera

== District and local organization ==
=== State Senate district ===
- First, Nikil Saval (D)

=== State House district ===
- 184th, Elizabeth Fiedler (D)

=== City Council district ===
- First, Mark Squilla (D)

=== Ward ===
- 1st
- 39th

=== Police district ===
- Third

== Civic groups and town watches ==
The East Passyunk Crossing Civic Association and Town Watch, Inc. aims to "advance the civic pride and preserve the historic integrity" of the area. The organization's activities are directed by five standing committees: Beautification (Clean and Green), Public Safety/Town Watch, Zoning/Planning, Community Relations (Marketing and Events) and Membership. Activities include monthly street clean-ups, neighborhood fairs, weekly Town Watch patrols and representation at local Zoning Board Commission hearings.

== See also ==
- Passyunk Township, Pennsylvania
- Main Street Programs in the United States
- Angelo Bruno, head of the Philadelphia Crime Family who lived at 10th and Snyder.
