= Delaplaine McDaniel School =

- U.S. National Register of Historic Places
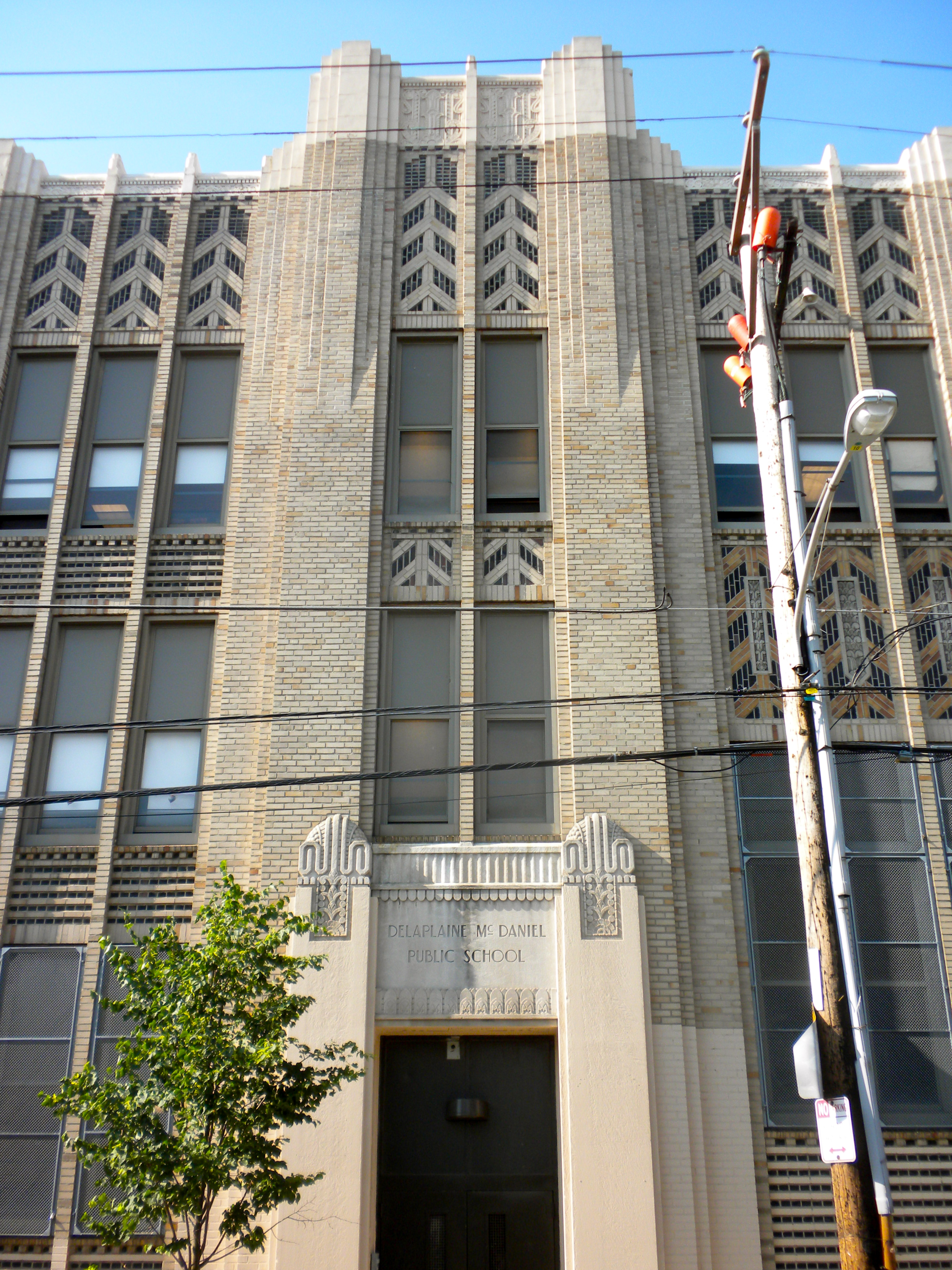
- Delaplaine McDaniel School entrance, May 2010

- Location within Philadelphia Location within Pennsylvania Location within the United States
- Location: 1801 S. 22nd Street, Philadelphia, Pennsylvania
- Coordinates: 39°55′46″N 75°10′54″W
- Area: 3 acres (1.2 ha)
- Built: 1935–1937
- Built by: Appleton, Murta & Co.
- Architect: Irwin T. Catharine
- Architectural style: Art Deco
- MPS: Philadelphia Public Schools TR
- NRHP reference No.: 86003303
- Added to NRHP: December 4, 1986

Delaplaine McDaniel School is a historic K-8 school located in the Point Breeze neighborhood of Philadelphia, Pennsylvania. It is part of the School District of Philadelphia. The building was designed by Irwin T. Catharine and built in 1935–1937. It is a three-story, 16 bay, yellow brick building in the Art Deco-style. It features three zigzag brick and limestone panels, brick pilasters with stepped capitals, and entrances with limestone pilasters. The school was named for the Philadelphia Quaker iron ore manufacturer and merchant Delaplaine McDaniel (1817–1885), who left funds for the establishment of the school.

The building was added to the National Register of Historic Places in 1986.

Residents zoned to McDaniel are zoned to South Philadelphia High School.

== Gallery ==
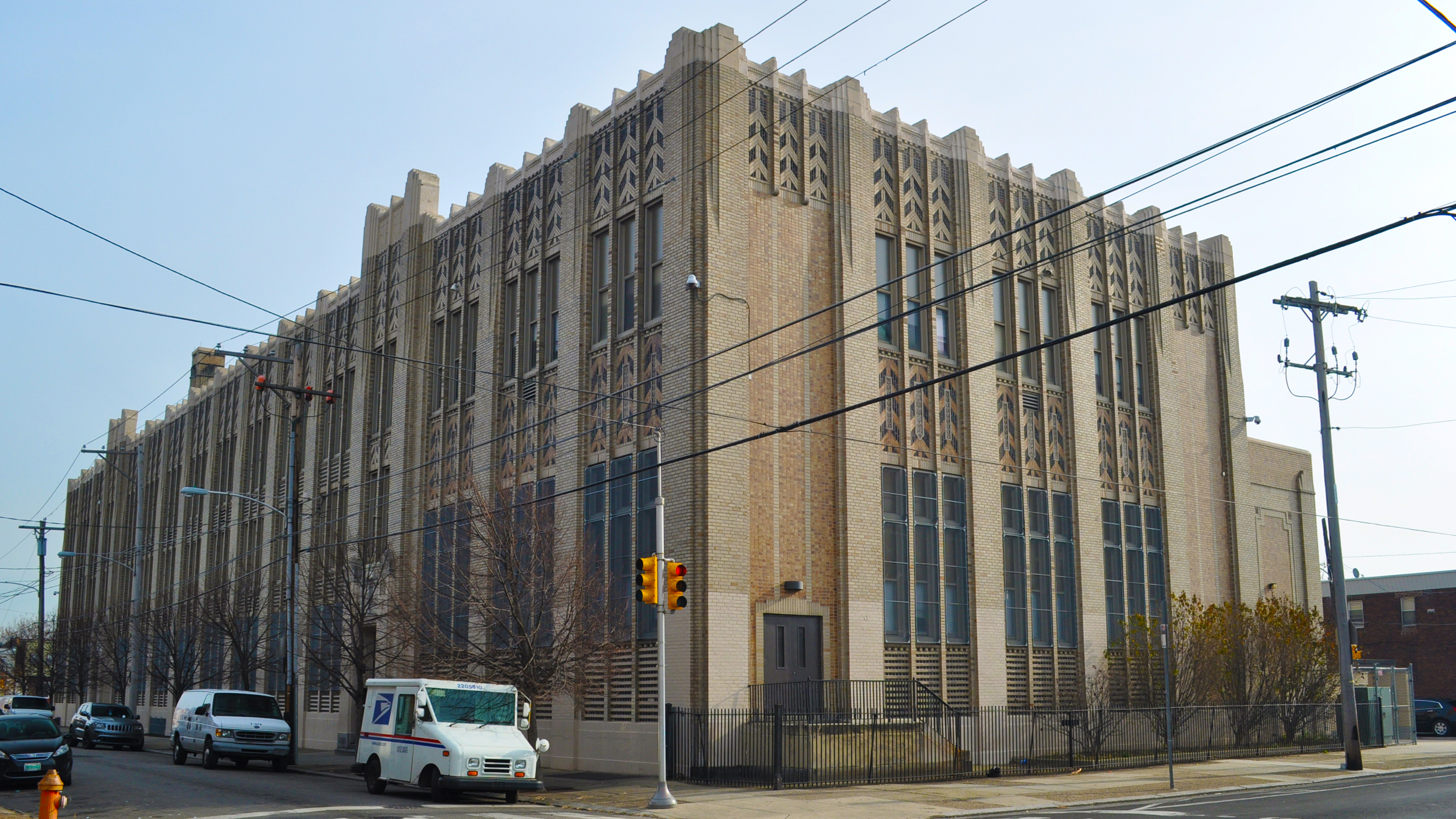

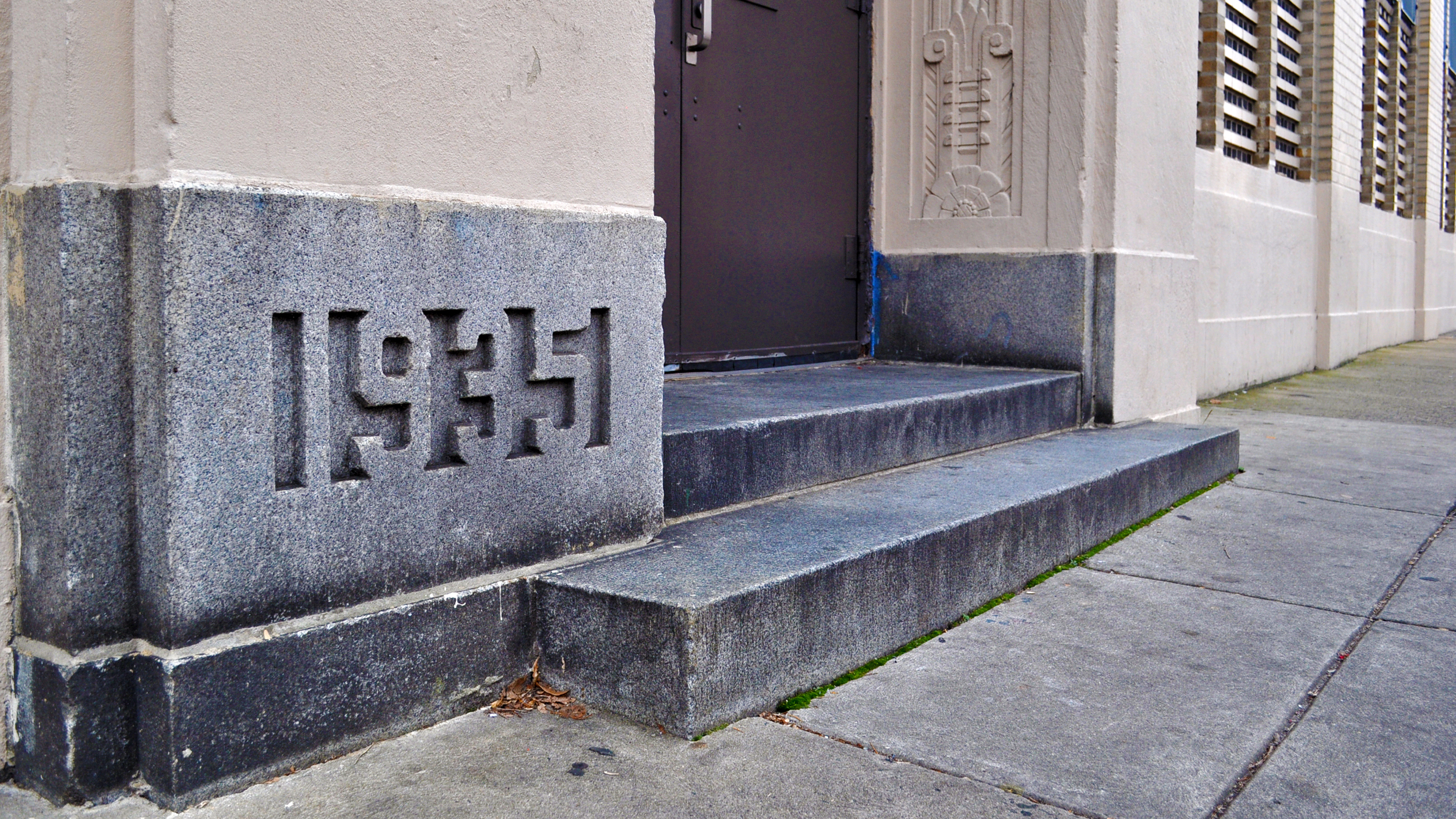
