= South Philadelphia =

Neighborhood of Philadelphia, Pennsylvania

- Neighborhood
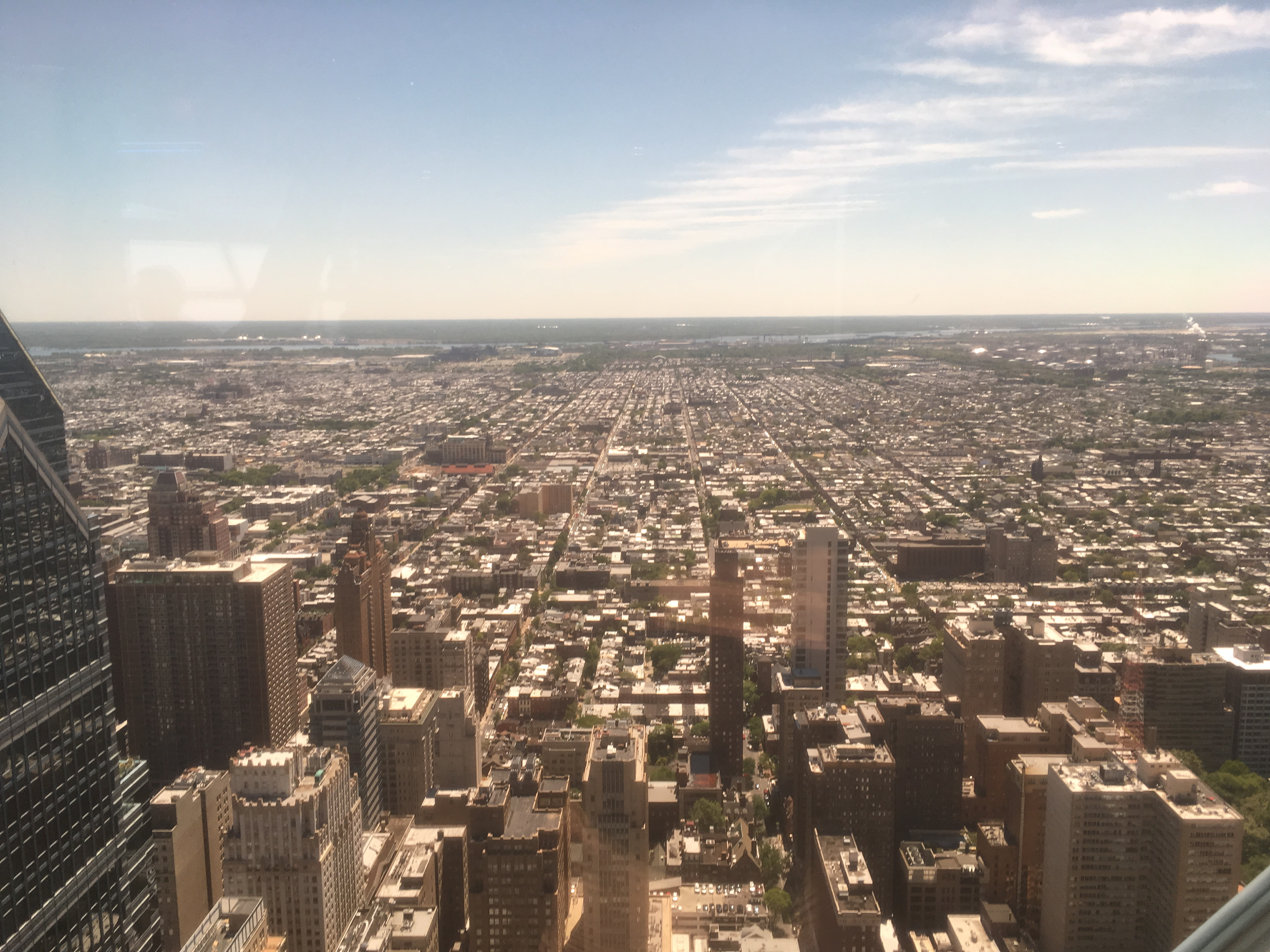
- South Philadelphia as seen from the One Liberty Observation Deck in May 2017

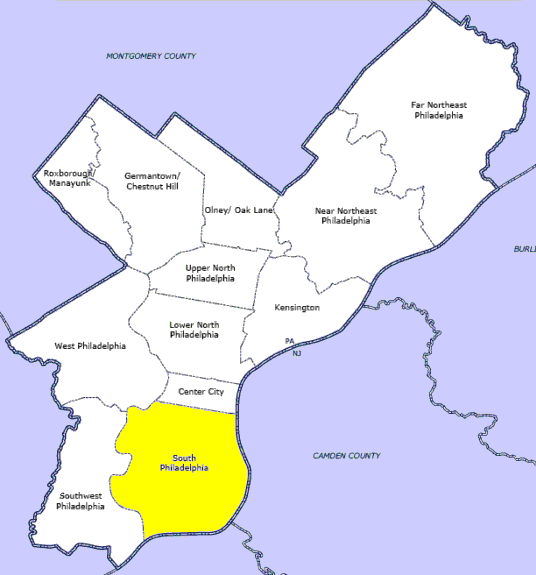
- South Philadelphia highlighted on a map of Philadelphia County
- Coordinates: 39.9231°N 75.1753°W
- Country: United States of America
- State: Pennsylvania
- County: Philadelphia
- City: Philadelphia

Area
  - Total: 9.7 sq mi (25 km^{2})

Population (2020)
  - Total: 175,717 (estimated)
  - Density: 18,115/sq mi (6,994/km^{2})
- ZIP Codes: 19112, 19145, 19146, 19147, 19148
- Area codes: 267, 215, 445

South Philadelphia, nicknamed South Philly, is the section of Philadelphia bounded by South Street to the north, the Delaware River to the east and south, and the Schuylkill River to the west. A diverse working-class community of many neighborhoods, South Philadelphia is well known for its large Italian-American population, though it also contains large Irish-American, Asian-American, African-American, and Latino populations.

== History ==
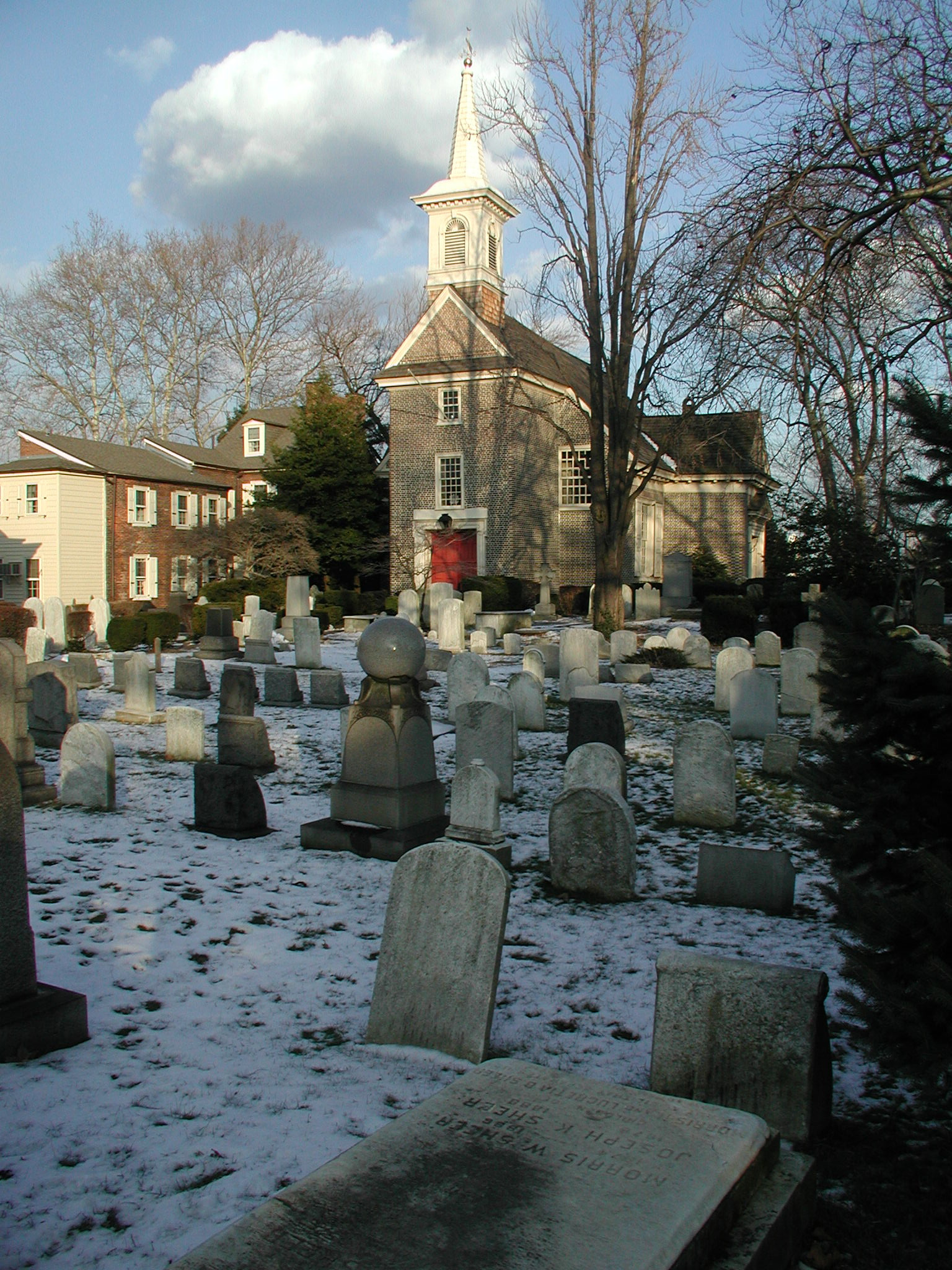
Gloria Dei Church

South Philadelphia began as a satellite town of Philadelphia, with small townships such as Moyamensing and Southwark. Towards the end of the First Industrial Revolution, the area saw rapid growth in population and urban development. This expansion was in part due to an influx of working class laborers and immigrants looking for factory jobs and dock work, as well as the first wave of mass immigration of Irish refugees or impoverished immigrants from Ireland in the wake of the Great Irish Hunger. South Philadelphia's urbanized border eventually expanded to reach that of Philadelphia proper, or what is today known as Center City Philadelphia. Along with all other jurisdictions in Philadelphia County, South Philadelphia became part of the City of Philadelphia proper with passage by the Pennsylvania legislature of the city–county Act of Consolidation, 1854.

The area continued to grow, becoming a vital part of Philadelphia's large industrial base and attracting immigrants from Italy, Ireland, Poland and many Southern European and Eastern European countries during the late 19th and early to mid-20th centuries, as well as Black American migrants from the southern United States during the Great Migration of the early 20th century. The immigrants and migrants became the basis of South Philadelphia's unique and vibrant culture that developed over the next several decades. Struggling to maintain their Catholic identity in a mostly Protestant city, the Irish built a system of Irish Catholic churches and parochial schools for their children, including Catholic high schools. The later immigrant populations of Italians and Poles were also Catholic. Initially, these populations attended existing Catholic churches but built their own ethno-national churches when possible. However, the more established Irish-American ethnic community controlled the Catholic clergy and hierarchy for decades in Philadelphia and throughout the region, often excluding the more recent Italian (and, to a lesser extent, Polish) populations from participating in the church hierarchy.

In addition to the influx of Catholic immigrants to the majority Protestant city of Philadelphia, many Polish Jews and other Jews from Central and Eastern Europe settled in South Philadelphia during the first half of the 20th century, especially in the diverse area now known as Queen Village where Jewish immigrants lived among Catholic Polish immigrants, Irish-Americans, and Italian immigrants. A smaller but significant Greek immigrant community also flourished around this time, leading to the establishment of Greek Orthodox parishes in South Philadelphia, while Lebanese immigrants established Lebanese Maronite parishes. Despite this dramatic growth in population, the low funding of education by the city resulted in the first public high school not being formed in South Philadelphia until 1934.

Attracted to the industrial jobs, the new residents of South Philadelphia created communities that continued many of their Old World traditions. While many of the new arrivals were Catholic, neighborhood parishes reflected their ethnic and national traditions. Monsignor James F. Connelly, the pastor of the Stella Maris Catholic Church and an editor of the 1976 work The History of the Archdiocese of Philadelphia, said in a 2005 Philadelphia Inquirer article that each parish church "offer[s] the immigrants the faith they were familiar with." Coptic Orthodox Christian churches were also established in South Philadelphia in the 1960s. With the dramatic loss of industrial jobs during mid-20th century restructuring, there were population losses in South Philadelphia as well as other working-class parts of the city, and some neighborhood Catholic schools had to close.

Today, many of South Philadelphia's communities are largely Italian Americans. Many of these communities contain both older and more recent Italian immigrants and Italian speakers, and Italian saint festivals and cultural celebrations, including the South 9th Street Italian Market festival, are popular in the South Philadelphia Italian-American communities. In addition, South Philadelphia continues to be home to many ethnic Irish American communities and African American communities. Both Irish American and African American communities can be found in the neighborhoods of Grays Ferry and Southwest Center City, while the nearby neighborhood of Point Breeze is largely African American and is often considered the center of the South Philadelphia's African American communities. The neighborhood of Pennsport remains primarily a working class Irish-American neighborhood and the cultural center of Irish-American South Philadelphia.

An increase in late 20th-century and early 21st-century immigration has given South Philadelphia significant populations from Asia, particularly Southeast Asia, including populations from Vietnam, Cambodia, Indonesia, and Thailand. In addition, there has been an increase in recent years of immigrants from Russia, Mexico, and Central American nations such as Honduras, Guatemala, and El Salvador. Today, many vendors that work alongside the Italian-Americans at the Italian Market are of Asian descent and Mexican or Central American descent, and Vietnamese, Thai, Mexican, and Central American restaurants are interspersed with historic Italian restaurants in the Market area. The recent revitalization of Center City Philadelphia and the subsequent gentrification of adjacent neighborhoods has also led to dramatic rises in prices of housing in the neighborhoods of historic Queen Village, Bella Vista, and some other northern parts of South Philadelphia, leading to an influx of young urban professionals in those more northern neighborhoods.

Many of the community clubs that create the annual Mummers Parade every New Year's Day have traditionally been from South Philadelphia, especially those located on the largely Irish-American S. 2nd Street ("Two Street") in the Pennsport neighborhood.

== Government and infrastructure ==
Portions of South Philadelphia are within Philadelphia City Council Districts 1 and 2. As of 2014 Councilman Mark Squilla and Councilman Kenyatta Johnson represent the two districts.

The Philadelphia Fire Department operates nine fire stations serving South Philadelphia. Most of South Philadelphia resides in Fire Battalion 1, headquartered at 711 S. Broad Street. Portions of South Philadelphia reside in Battalion 4, headquartered at N. 4th and Arch streets, and Battalion 11, headquartered at 43rd and Market streets.

The Philadelphia Police Department patrols three districts located within South Philadelphia. The three patrol districts serving South Philadelphia are the 1st, 3rd and 17th districts.

== Geography ==
According to the United States Census Bureau, South Philadelphia has an area of 9.7 sq. miles, all land.

=== Neighborhoods ===
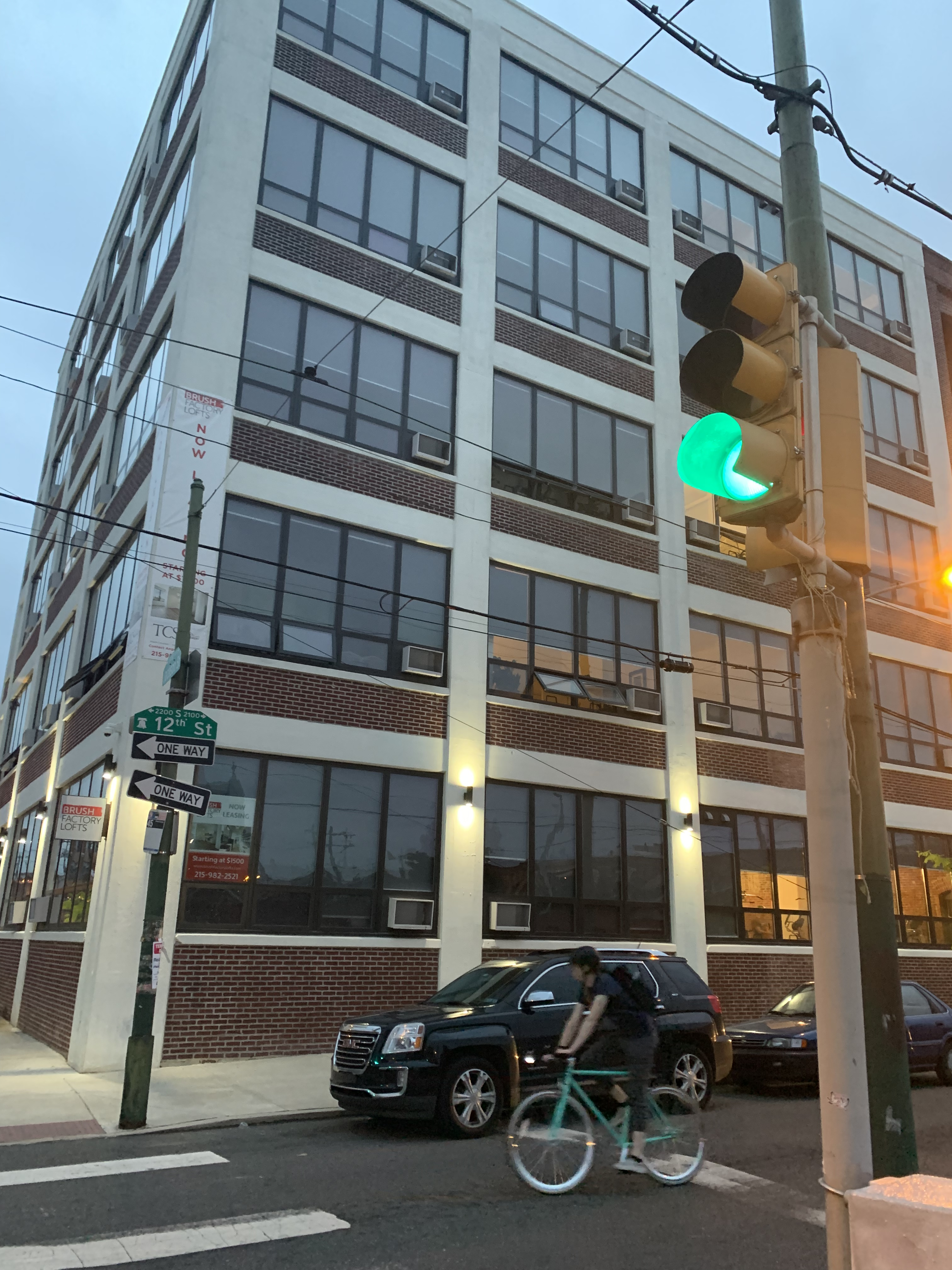
A factory converted into lofts in Lower Moyamensing

The South Philadelphia Planning Analysis Section is bounded by South Street on the north and the Delaware and Schuylkill rivers to their confluence. The portions on either side of Broad Street are known as South Philadelphia West and South Philadelphia East.

- Bella Vista: North to South Street, South to Washington Avenue, West to 11th Street, East to 6th Street
- Cambodia Town
- Central South Philadelphia
- Devil's Pocket: Irish neighborhood west of Grays Ferry Avenue
- Dickinson Square West - Diverse neighborhood. Washington to Mifflin, 4th to 6th.
- East Passyunk Crossing: North to Tasker Street, South to Snyder Avenue, West to Broad Street, East to 9th Street
- Franklin Delano Roosevelt Park
- Girard Estate
- Greenwich: 4th to 9th Streets, Mifflin to Snyder
- Grays Ferry: North to Gray's Ferry Ave., south to Passyunk Ave., west to the Schuylkill River, east to 24th Street
- Hawthorne: From South Street to Washington Ave., Broad Street to 11th Street
- Italian Market: Along 9th Street from Fitzwater Street in the north to Wharton Street in the south.
- Little Saigon
- Lower Moyamensing: North to Snyder Avenue, South to Oregon Avenue, West to Broad Street, East to 7th Street
- Marconi Plaza
- Moyamensing
- Newbold
- Packer Park
- Passyunk Square: Washington Ave. to Tasker Street, 6th Street to Broad Street
- Pennsport: Locally referred to as "Two Street", Penn's Port is a predominantly Irish-American Catholic neighborhood.
- Point Breeze, a largely African-American neighborhood.
- Queen Village: North to Lombard Street, south to Washington Ave., east to the Delaware River, west to 6th Street. The neighborhood contains a large Jewish-American population.
- Schuylkill
- Southwark: The limits of the district started on Cedar (South) Street and the Delaware River, and proceeded west to Passyunk Ave.; along the latter to Moyamensing Ave.; then by Keeler's Lane to Greenwich Road; then to the Delaware River, and along the several courses of the same until reaching the beginning point again.
- Southwest Center City: North to South Street (Rittenhouse/Fitler), south to Washington Ave., east to Broad Street (Hawthorne), west to 24th Street (Gray's Ferry)
- Sports Complex
- West Passyunk
- Wharton
- Whitman

== Demographics ==
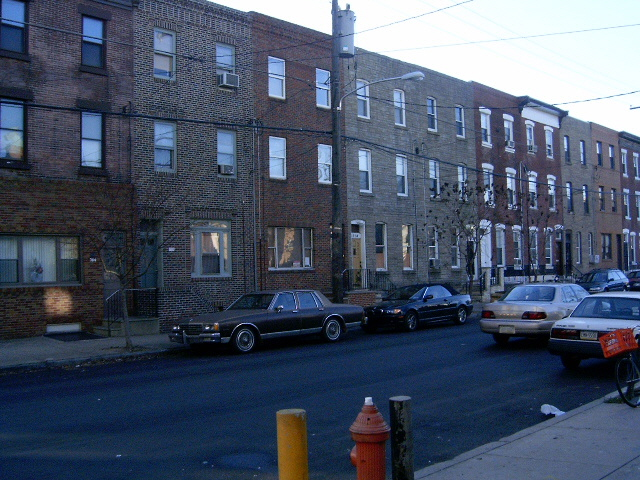
Row housing in South Philly, 2004

In 2010, the area's population was 168,782. Though mostly known for its large Italian population, South Philadelphia contains a diverse population of Italians, Irish, African Americans, and Mexicans, as well as growing populations of Vietnamese, Chinese, Cambodian, Indonesian, Thai, and Central Americans. In addition, the area contains smaller but historically significant Greek, Jewish, and Maronite Lebanese communities.

On January 22, 2010 the Associated Press said "South Philadelphia has been growing more diverse for decades, but the last 20 years have seen the greatest influx of Asian and Hispanic families." David Elesh, a Temple University urban sociologist, said that of the almost 60,000 Philadelphia residents who reported being born in China, many lived in South Philadelphia.

As of the 2010 Census, there are 168,782 people in 78,440 housing units. The population density is 16,771 people per square mile. 46.6% of the population is male, and 53.4% is female. The South Philadelphia area comprises the zip codes of 19145, 19146, 19147 and 19148.

=== Ethnic demographics ===
- Non-Hispanic White: 87,268 (51.8%)
- African-American: 43,404 (25.7%)
- Asian: 20,926 (12.4%)
- Hispanic or Latino: 12,866 (7.6%)
- Mixed or Other: 10,531 (6.1%)
- American Indian: 656 (0.3%)

==== Italians ====
The largest and oldest Italian immigrant settlements in Philadelphia are in South Philadelphia. Though rare and small in size, some early Italian immigrant settlements appeared in South Philadelphia prior to the 1890s; however, these small settlements generally consisted of a few skilled workers, merchants, and artists from Genoa and other wealthier areas of Northern Italy. In contrast, beginning in the 1890s, the vast majority of Italian immigrants that settled in Philadelphia came from impoverished regions of Southern Italy, with most Italian immigration to Philadelphia occurring in the 20th century. By 1910 there were over 75,000 Italians resident in Philadelphia, both foreign and native born, with two thirds or over 50,000 living in South Philadelphia, chiefly in the 2nd and 26th ward. Though Italians in Philadelphia emigrated from various Southern Italian regions, most Italians in Philadelphia emigrated from or have origins in three main areas: the previously combined regions of Abruzzo and Molise; the city of Messina in Sicily and the surrounding province; and Salerno and Avellino in Campania. To this day, dialects from those regions mixed with English are spoken in many South Philadelphia households and neighborhoods.

Italians in South Philadelphia experienced widespread discrimination from the larger majority populations of Philadelphia. For example, Italian neighborhoods in South Philadelphia were heavily redlined for decades specifically due to their Italian-American demographics. However, Italian-Americans in South Philadelphia have contributed greatly to the culture of Philadelphia, establishing the Italian Market, creating both the cheesesteak and the hoagie, and introducing Italian roast pork sandwiches, water ice, tomato pie and pizza to the cuisine of Philadelphia. Recently, some Italian-American South Philadelphians have moved to Southern New Jersey. However, the Italian-American population in Philadelphia remains the second largest in the country.

In 1852, the first Italian Catholic parish in the United States, St. Mary Magdalen de Pazzi, was founded by pre-mass immigration Italians. Donna J. Di Giacomo, author of Italians of Philadelphia, wrote that this church "was a hallmark of the neighborhood and touched many a South Philadelphia Italian's and Italian American's life in one way or another for generations."

==== Irish ====
Much of South Philadelphia's Irish population is located in the eastern part of the South Philadelphia, specifically Pennsport and Whitman. Pennsport, which is also locally referred to as "Two Street", is arguably the most well known Irish neighborhood in South Philadelphia. Pennsport is also home to many of the city's Mummers clubs, where some are known for their Irish American themes. Other Irish neighborhoods are located in the northwestern area of South Philadelphia, including Grays Ferry, Devil's Pocket and areas of Girard Estate, Southwest Center City and Schuylkill.

Philadelphia's large Irish community, however, is more prominent in other sections of the city, most notably Northeast Philadelphia.

==== Mexicans ====
As of 2000 the largest Mexican community in Philadelphia was in the area bounded by Front Street, 18th Street, Oregon Avenue, and Washington Avenue in South Philadelphia. As of 2011 most Mexicans in South Philadelphia originate from the state of Puebla.

==== African Americans ====
African Americans have lived in South Philadelphia since the early 19th century at the very least, though the city of Philadelphia proper was home to a significant population of freed and fugitive slaves from at least the 18th century onward. The majority of the current African American population in South Philadelphia, however, is descended from Southern migrants who moved into the city in high numbers during the first Great Migration in the early 20th century. South Street was originally considered the cultural and commercial center of this community, though the community became increasingly concentrated to western areas below South Street, including Point Breeze, Southwest Center City, Schuylkill and Grays Ferry. Point Breeze and South Street particularly served as Philadelphia's "Harlem" during the first half of the 20th century. The first police station and fire station staffed by African Americans were located on South Street. Famous South Philadelphians include opera contralto Marian Anderson and musicians Kenny Gamble and Chubby Checker. The Odunde Festival, arguably the largest street festival in Philadelphia, is an African-American celebration that is held annually in the South Street area. As of 2013, those who identified as "Black alone" or in combination with another ethnicity totaled 45,482 persons living in the zip codes 19145, 19146, 19147 and 19148. The African American population in South Philadelphia has historically constituted between 25% and 30% of South Philadelphia's population - 27% "Black alone" and in combination with another ethnicity, as of a 2013 population estimate.

== Transportation ==
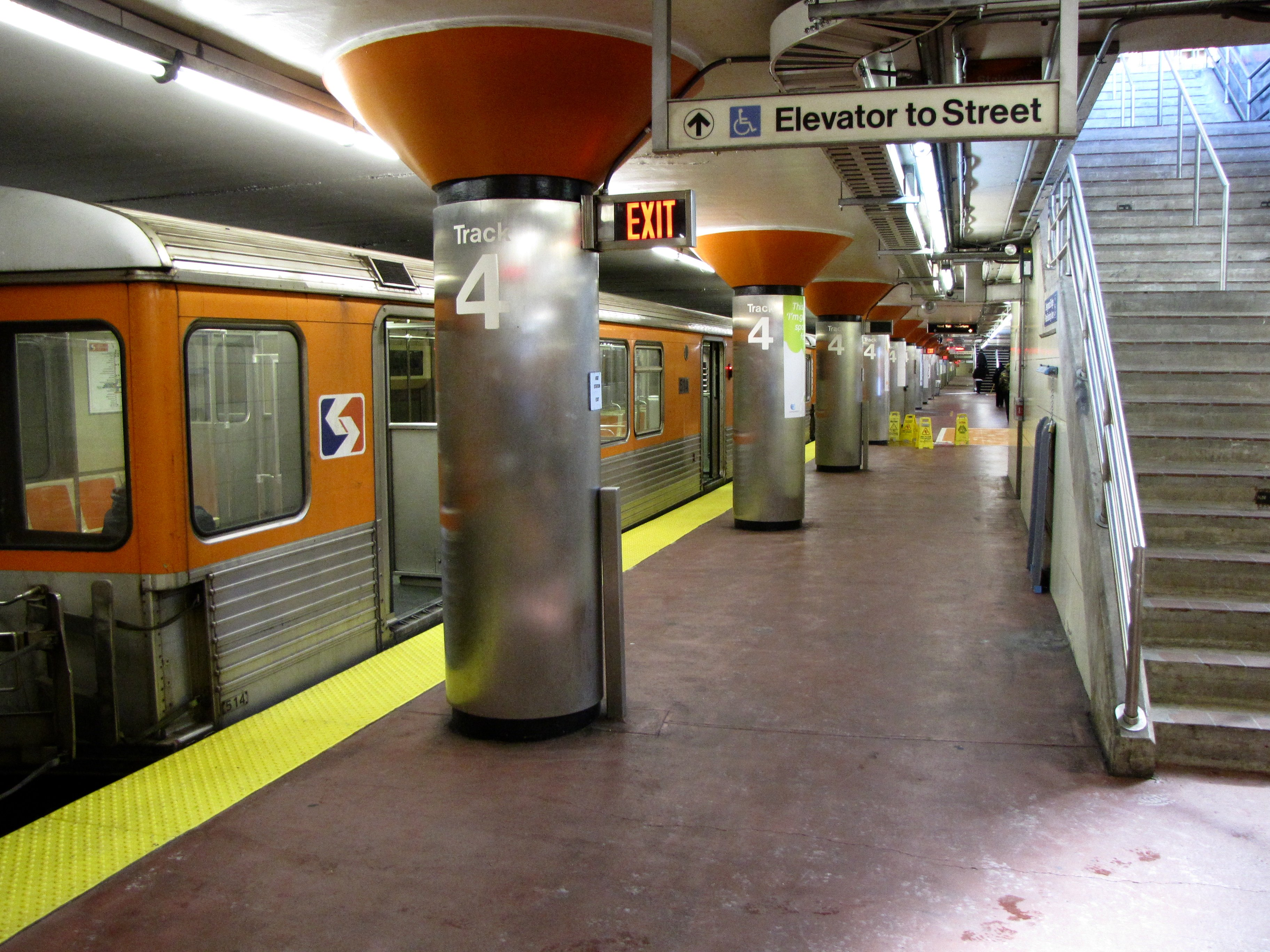
SEPTA's NRG Station (formerly Pattison station)

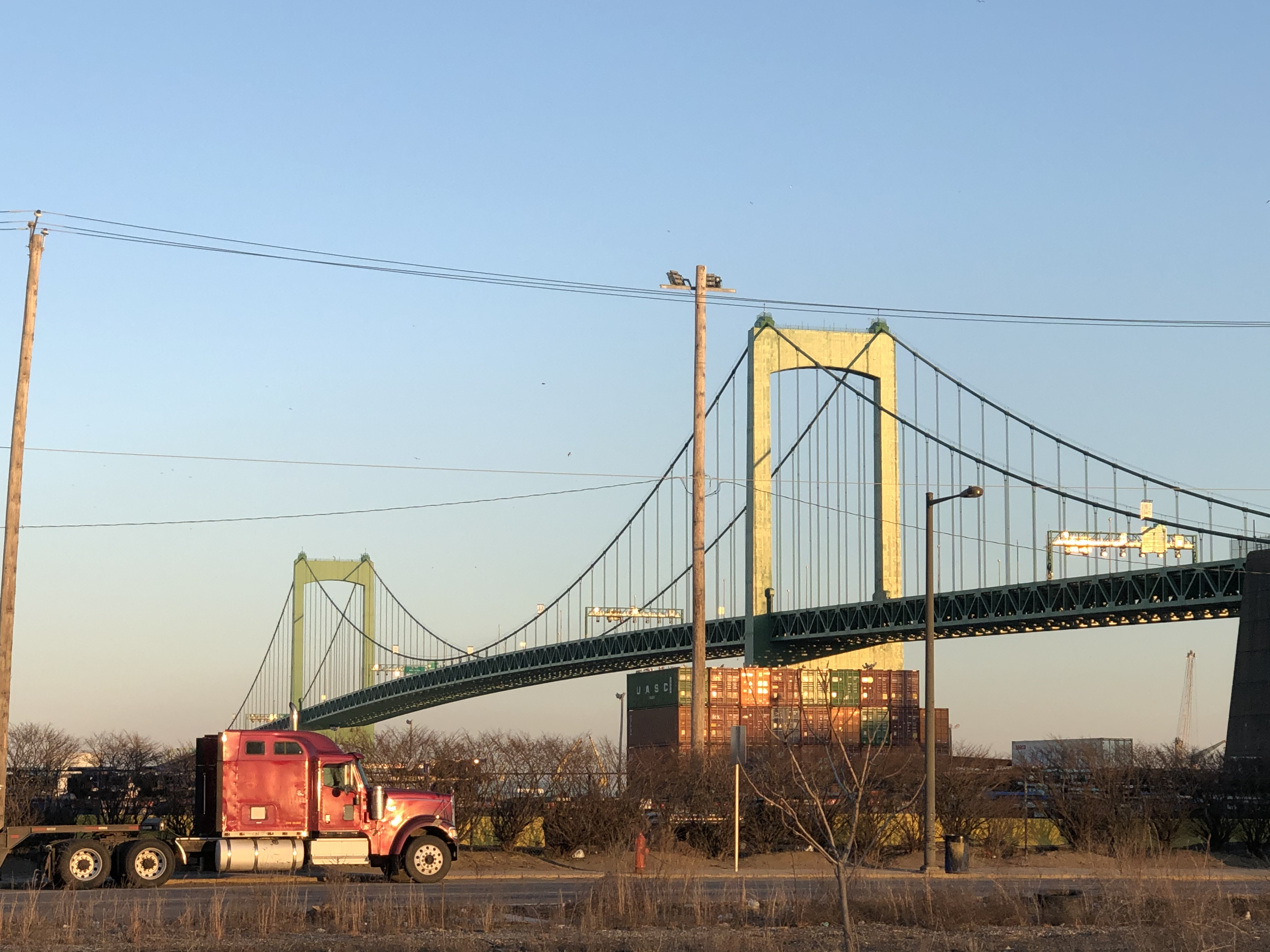
Walt Whitman Bridge connects South Philadelphia with South Jersey

SEPTA's Broad Street Line subway services South Philadelphia and provides quick access to Center City and North Philadelphia. A number of SEPTA bus routes also serve South Philadelphia, ferrying commuters to and from Center City and the surrounding neighborhoods and suburbs.

I-95 runs north and south through South Philadelphia and, in this area, provides commuters with access to Philadelphia International Airport, I-76, the South Philadelphia Sports Complex and the Walt Whitman Bridge. The Girard Point Bridge section of I-95 crosses over the mouth of the Schuylkill River, where it merges with the Delaware River.

I-76 runs from the Walt Whitman Bridge to Passyunk Avenue in South Philadelphia and allows access between this section of the city and University City, Center City, 30th Street Station and the western suburbs.

In addition, PA Route 291 serves as a major artery between the area and Delaware County, crossing the Schuylkill River via the Platt Bridge, named for Medal of Honor recipient George C. Platt. Broad Street is part of PA Route 611.

South Philadelphia is served by unprotected bike lanes on many streets going in all directions. Snyder Avenue has unprotected bike lanes going East and West. Columbus Boulevard has North and South bike lanes which are separated from automobile traffic from Reed Street to Center City. 22nd Street provides Northward lanes for cyclists. Some streets such as 11th Street have both Bike lanes and Sharrows or Shared lane marking. In 2022, Washington Avenue east of Broad Street was transformed into a multimodel road with protected bike lanes and pedestrial crossings. The span of Washington Avenue west of Broad Street underwent repaving and minor changes to bike lanes.

As of 2016 two Taiwanese airlines, China Airlines and EVA Air, provide private bus services to and from John F. Kennedy International Airport in New York City for customers based in the Philadelphia area. These bus services stop in South Philadelphia.

== Crime ==
The Italian-American Mafia family known as the Philadelphia crime family is active in the area, maintaining much of its operations in South Philadelphia. The African-American Black Mafia and its offshoot, the Junior Black Mafia, have also had a presence in the Point Breeze section of South Philadelphia since the late 1960s.

Historical gangs include the Italian Philadelphia poison ring as well as the Lanzetta brothers, a gang of six Italian-American brothers who were drug traffickers and bootleggers. All six brothers were born in the Third Ward of South Philadelphia. South Philadelphia (along with Atlantic City) was a part of their territory, in which they fought with rival bootleggers William Michael "Mickey Duffy" Cusick and Joe Bruno during Prohibition.

Angelo Bruno, who was boss of the Philadelphia crime family, was murdered in front of his house at 10th and Snyder Avenues in 1980.

== Education ==
=== Primary and secondary schools ===
==== Public schools ====
Residents are with the School District of Philadelphia's South District. Zoned public high schools in South Philadelphia include South Philadelphia High School, Audenried High School, and Furness High School. Historic school buildings include Francis Scott Key School and Southwark School.

Academy at Palumbo, Girard Academic Music Program and The Philadelphia High School for the Creative and Performing Arts (CAPA), all public magnet schools, are in South Philadelphia, at 11th and Catharine streets, 21st and Ritner streets, and Broad and Carpenter streets, respectively.

The Mastery Charter Schools system operates the Thomas School (grades 7–12) in South Philadelphia. It was formerly the district school Thomas Middle School, and shares a campus with a district elementary school, D. Newlin Fell School, at 9th Street and Oregon Avenue.

==== Private schools ====
Saints John Neumann and Maria Goretti Catholic High School is in South Philadelphia. It is a merger of the former Saint John Neumann High School and the Saint Maria Goretti High School. In addition, there are several Catholic elementary schools in South Philadelphia, usually tied to a local parish church. In 2010 South Philadelphia Catholic elementary schools had 2,572 students, a decline by 27% from the 2006 figure.

Philadelphia Free School, patterned on the Sudbury school model, is located at the intersection of 21st and Christian streets.

=== Public libraries ===
Free Library of Philadelphia operates six branches in South Philadelphia: Charles Santore, Fumo Family, Queen Memorial, South Philadelphia, Thomas F. Donatucci Sr. and Whitman. Prior to its 1999 reopening in a new building, the Fumo Branch was known as the Ritner Children's Branch. Prior to 2004, the Donatucci Branch was the Passyunk Branch, and the Santore Branch was the Southwark Branch.

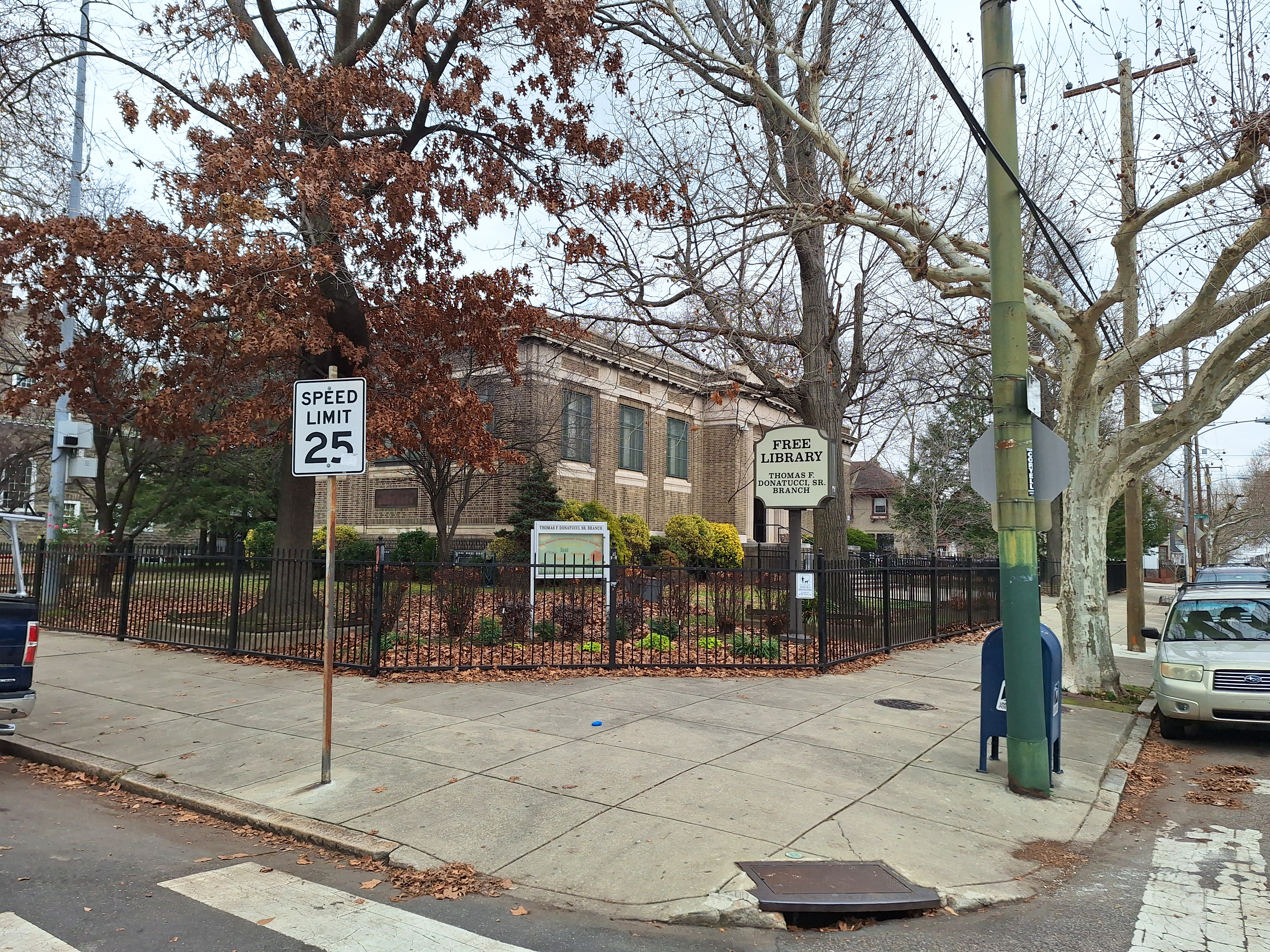
Donatucci Branch

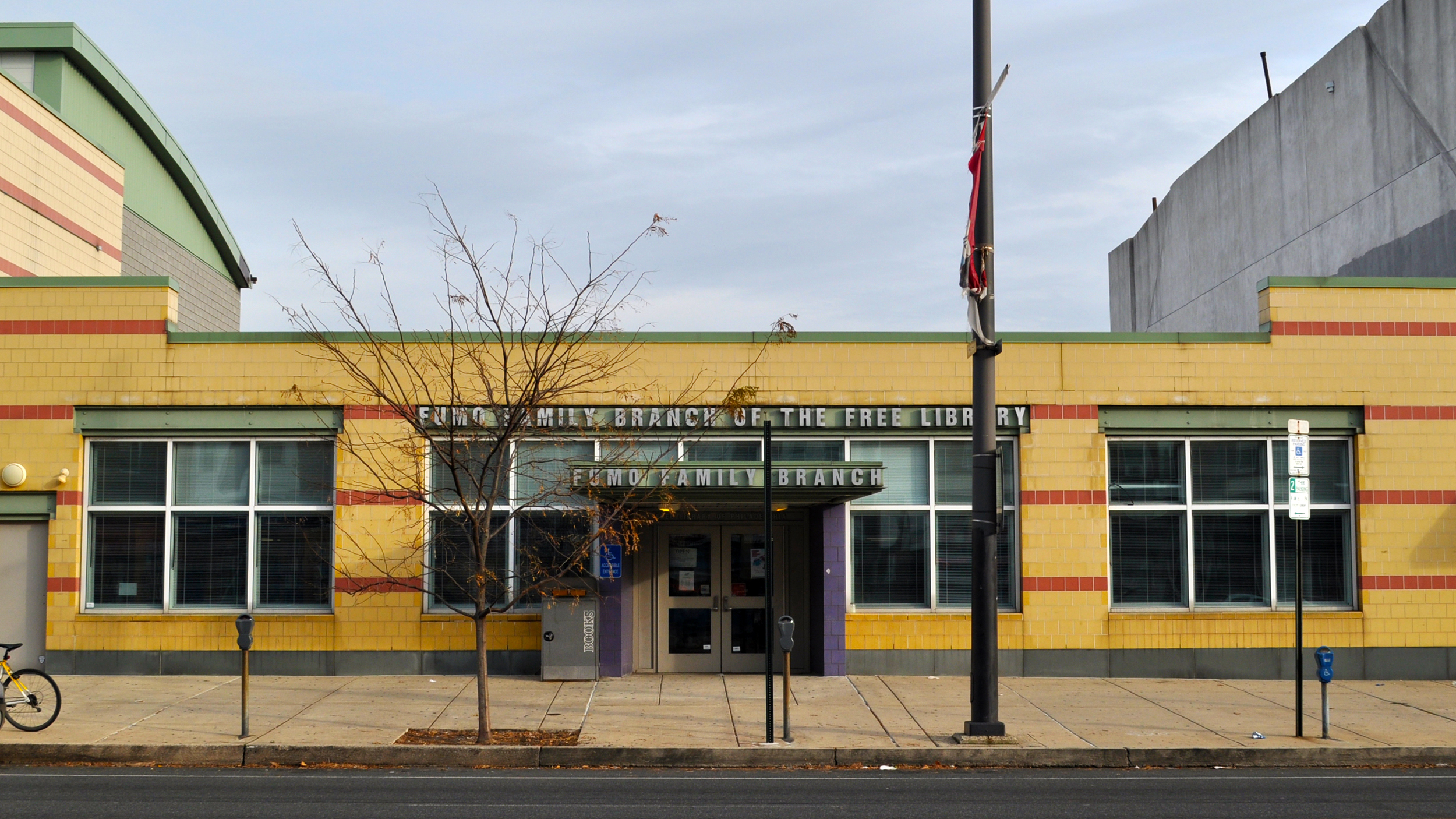
Fumo Branch

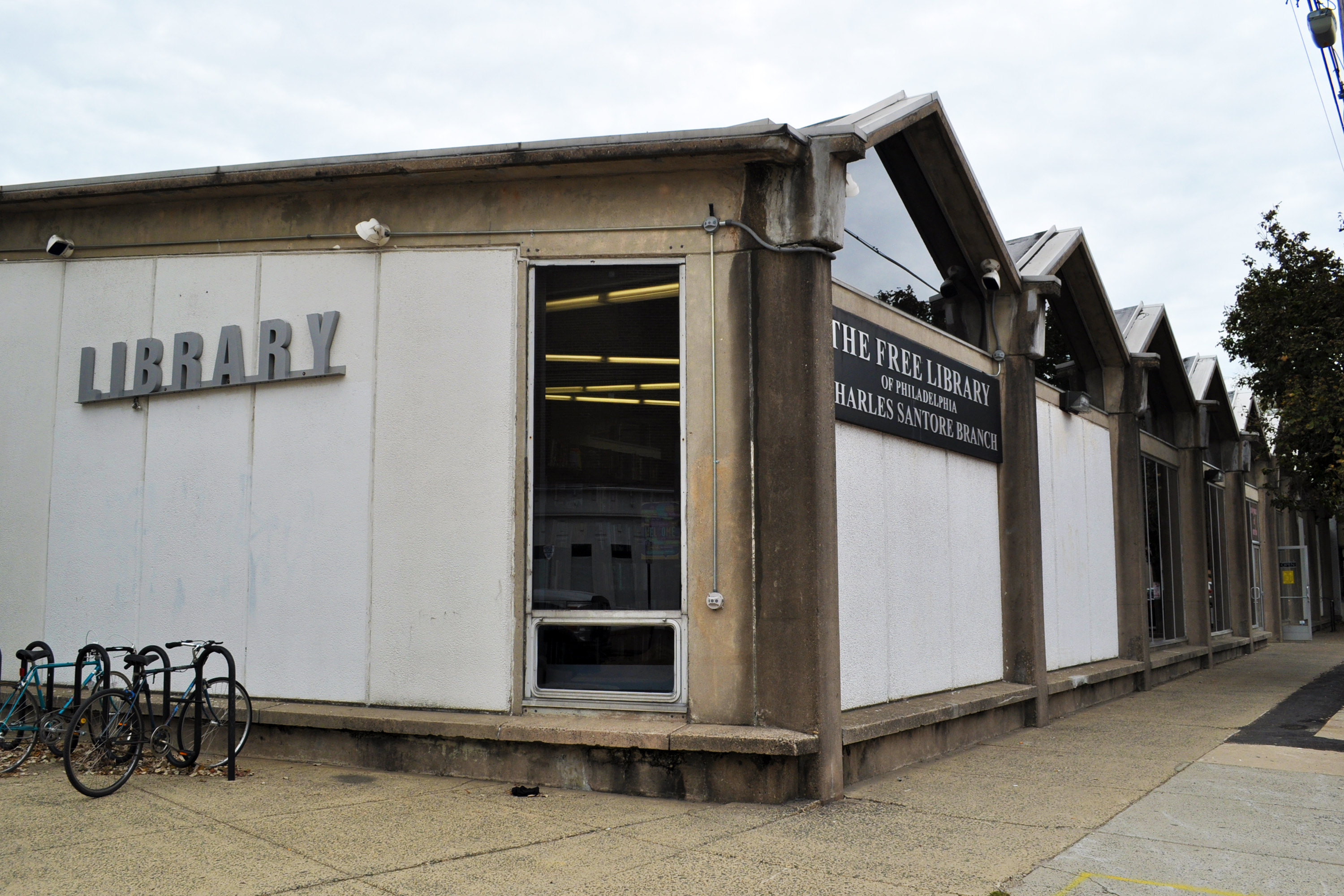
Santore Branch

== Places of note ==
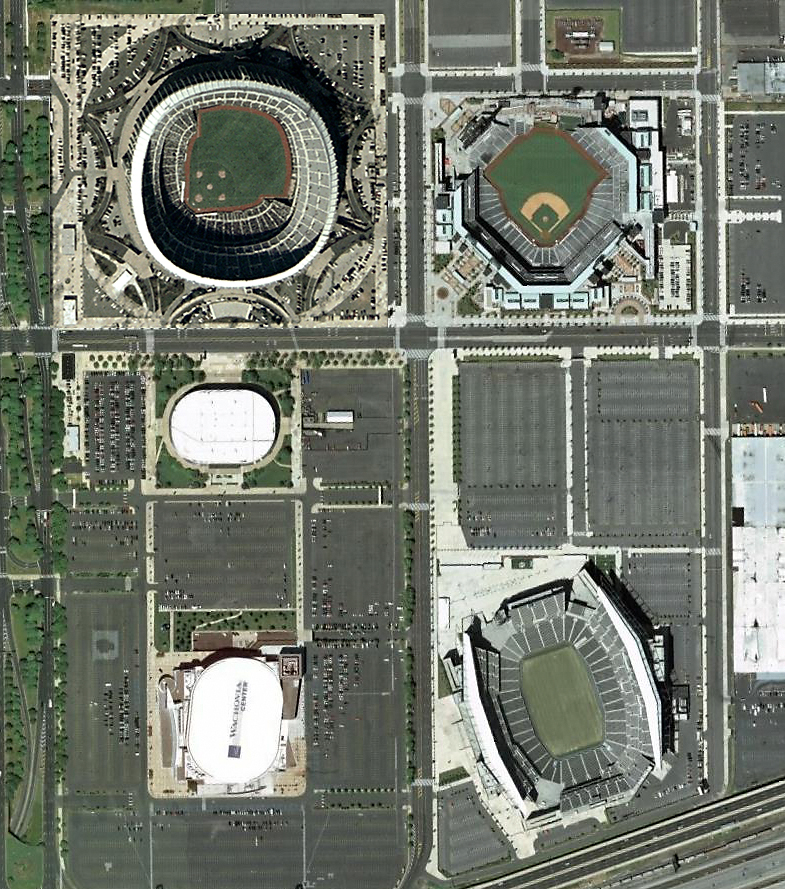
The configuration of the South Philadelphia Sports Complex in early 2004. Clockwise from top right: Citizens Bank Park, Lincoln Financial Field, Xfinity Mobile Arena (formerly the site of John F. Kennedy Stadium), Wachovia Spectrum (razed in 2010–11), and Veterans Stadium (demolished on March 21, 2004). Interstate 95 can be seen running through the bottom right corner of the photo.

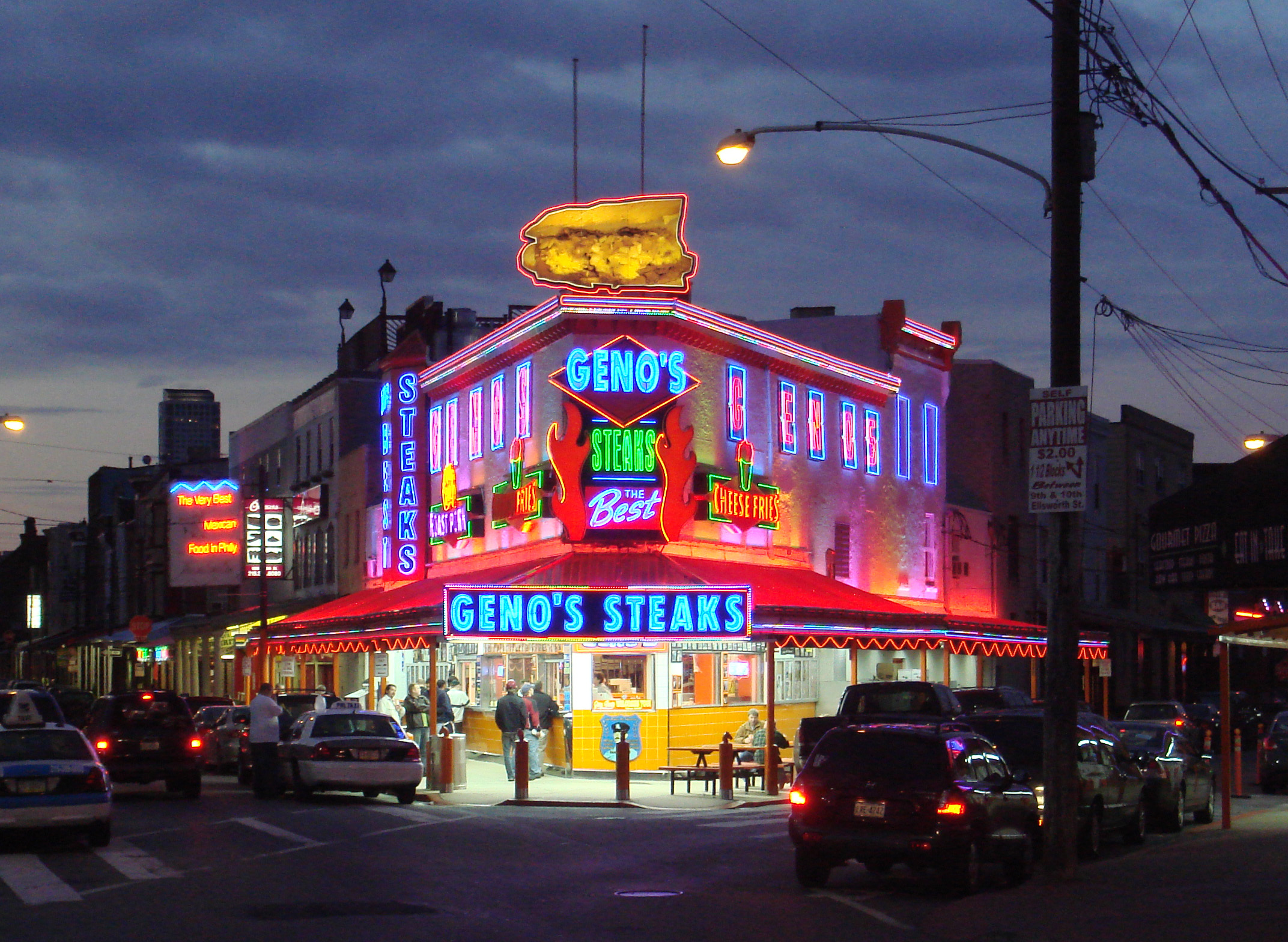
Geno's Steaks at 1219 S. 9th Street in South Philadelphia

South Street has long been considered the border between South Philadelphia proper and Center City. It originally ran east and west (although traffic is now routed east one-way). Many bars, nightspots, shops and restaurants are located along this neon-lit hotspot, with occasional live music venues (including the Theatre of Living Arts) along the way.

The intersection of 9th Street and Passyunk Avenue is home to the regionally famous Geno's Steaks and Pat's King of Steaks cheesesteak shops, fierce competitors in the local deli market for decades. Also, nearby is the city's open-air Italian Market, specializing in fresh produce, meats and other foods. It is lined by specialty shops, such as butchers, bakeries and cheese/grocery stores, as well as one for kitchen goods, and new cafes and coffee houses. The area was featured in the film Rocky and its sequels. This is the heart of an annual street festival celebrating the neighborhood's food.

Edward W. Bok Technical High School, listed on the National Register of Historic Places, has been converted into a workspace and community center.

Among the largest landmarks in South Philadelphia is the South Philadelphia Sports Complex at the corner of Broad Street and Pattison Avenue. Here, the Philadelphia Phillies (professional baseball), Philadelphia Eagles (professional football), Philadelphia 76ers (professional basketball), Philadelphia Flyers (professional ice hockey), Philadelphia Soul (professional arena football), Temple Owls (college football) make their home in the massive state-of-the-art sports arenas surrounding the well-known intersection: Citizens Bank Park, Lincoln Financial Field and Xfinity Mobile Arena. Also located at the sports complex is Stateside Live!, a dining and entertainment complex.

The South Philadelphia Sports Complex is home to both Citizens Bank Park, the home field of the Philadelphia Phillies, Lincoln Financial Field, the home field of the Philadelphia Eagles, Xfinity Mobile Arena, the home arena of the Philadelphia 76ers and Philadelphia Flyers, and the NovaCare Complex, the practice facility of the Philadelphia Eagles. The sports complex region also once housed Veterans Stadium, the former home field of the Eagles and Phillies, which stood from 1971 to 2004, John F. Kennedy Stadium, which stood from 1925 to 1992, and the Spectrum, the former arena of the 76ers and Flyers, which was in use from 1967 to 2009 and was demolished in 2011.

Live! Casino & Hotel Philadelphia is located in South Philadelphia near the South Philadelphia Sports Complex. The casino has over 2,100 slot machines and electronic table games, 150 table games, a poker room, and a sportsbook. The complex also has a 12-story hotel, dining, entertainment, and an event center. The South Philadelphia Race & Sportsbook operated by Parx Racing is located in South Philadelphia near the South Philadelphia Sports Complex, offering off-track betting and sports betting.

Franklin Delano Roosevelt (FDR) Park (originally named League Island Park) is a park located along the Delaware River in the southernmost point of South Philadelphia, comprising some 348 acres (1.41 km^{2}). The park was built to the design of Olmsted Brothers, the firm of Frederick Law Olmsted Jr. and John Charles Olmsted in the early 20th century. The American Swedish Historical Museum is located in Franklin Delano Roosevelt Park.

The Philadelphia Naval Shipyard is located in this section of town along the Delaware River. For decade during the World Wars and after, the shipyard was a major employer, whose craftsmen built new ships and repaired and maintained existing ones. With the decline in the military uses, the area is being redeveloped by the Navy and city for a variety of business and industrial uses.

A refurbished area of South Philadelphia alongside Columbus Boulevard/Delaware Avenue (near the Walt Whitman Bridge), Columbus Commons, provides big box shopping and chain restaurants.

Washington Avenue, between 16th St. on the west and Front St. on the east, is home to many Asian businesses, including Vietnamese, Chinese and Korean. Among these are restaurants of all types, two large Asian supermarkets, jewelers and a wide variety of specialty shops.

Passyunk Avenue, running on a diagonal from Broad Street to South Street, is a formerly thriving consumer district currently undergoing revitalization efforts. Within the past few years, several coffeeshops, restaurants and bars have opened which appeal to the younger population beginning to live in the area. In addition, a farmers' market is held on Wednesday nights at one of the squares.

2300 Arena (better known as the ECW Arena) at the corner of Swanson Street and Ritner Street is a venue known for hosting boxing and professional wrestling events.

== Notable people ==
- Al Alberts (born Al Albertini), singer and composer; co-founder and lead singer of The Four Aces
- Marian Anderson, opera singer and Congressional Gold Medal recipient
- Frankie Avalon (born Francis Avallone), actor, singer, teen idol
- Joey Bishop, actor, comedian, member of the "Rat Pack"
- Black Thought, MC and co-founder of The Roots
- Angelo Bruno, former head of the Philadelphia crime family.
- Octavius Valentine Catto, educator, intellectual, and civil rights activist
- Mario Cerrito, filmmaker known in the horror genre.
- Danny Cedrone, bandleader, guitarist for "Rock Around the Clock"
- Chubby Checker, singer of The Twist
- Stanley Cowell, jazz pianist, founder of Strata-East Records, member of the Heath Brothers
- Jim Croce, singer-songwriter
- Joey DeFrancesco, jazz organist, trumpeter, vocalist
- Buddy DeFranco, jazz clarinet player
- James DePreist, conductor of the Tokyo Metropolitan Symphony Orchestra, director at the Juilliard School, laureate music director of the Oregon Symphony
- Fred Diodati, lead singer of The Four Aces
- Michael "Mickey" Duffy, mobster
- Charles Earland, jazz composer, organist, saxophonist
- Fabian (born Fabiano Forte), 1950s teen idol
- Wilhelmenia Fernandez, soprano, star of the film Diva
- Larry Fine, member of the comedy act The Three Stooges
- Linda Fiorentino, actress (Dogma, Men in Black, The Last Seduction)
- Al Fisher, guard for the Kent State Golden Flashes
- Eddie Fisher, singer, entertainer ("Oh My Papa", "Lady of Spain")
- Edwin Forrest, 19th century stage actor
- Kenny Gamble, Rock and Roll Hall of Fame songwriting and record production team Gamble and Huff
- Dusolina Giannini, soprano (Metropolitan Opera)
- Vittorio Giannini, composer of operas, symphonies, and band music
- Stephen Girard, banker, philanthropist, slave owner.
- Charlie Gracie, rock pioneer and singer
- Johnny Grande , musician
- Isadore Granoff, founder of the Granoff School of Music
- Buddy Greco, singer ("The Lady is a Tramp") and pianist
- William Guarnere, nicknamed "Wild Bill", member of 506th Parachute Infantry Regiment E, "Easy Company"
- Frank Guarrera, baritone (Metropolitan Opera)
- Albert "Tootie" Heath, jazz drummer, member of the Heath Brothers
- Jimmy Heath, jazz tenor saxophonist, member of the Heath Brothers
- Percy Heath, double bass player for the Modern Jazz Quartet, member of the Heath Brothers
- Edward "Babe" Heffron, member of 506th Parachute Infantry Regiment E, "Easy Company"
- Sherman Hemsley, actor (All in the Family, The Jeffersons, Amen)
- Max "Boo Boo" Hoff, mobster
- Dom Irrera, comedian
- Albert Innaurato, playwright, theatre director, and writer
- Jerry Jaye, country/rockabilly singer ("My Girl Josephine")
- Kitty Kallen, singer ("Little Things Mean a Lot")
- Irvin Kershner, director (The Empire Strikes Back, RoboCop 2)
- Jack Klugman, actor (The Odd Couple, Quincy, M.E., 12 Angry Men)
- Kenny Koplove, baseball player
- Joseph Kramm, playwright (Pulitzer Prize for The Shrike), actor, and director
- Eddie Lang, jazz guitarist
- Mario Lanza, tenor and actor (The Great Caruso)
- Joseph Anthony "Uncle Joe" Ligambi, current boss of the Philadelphia crime family.
- Hy Lit, Philadelphia-area DJ from the 1950s until 2005
- George Litto, film producer (Thieves Like Us, Dressed to Kill and Blow Out)
- Walter P. Lomax Jr., physician and entrepreneur
- Bernie Lowe, songwriter, producer, arranger, founder of Cameo Records, launched careers of Chubby Checker, Charlie Gracie, Dee Dee Sharp, Bobby Rydell, The Orlons
- Man Ray, modernist/Dada/Surrealist artist
- Gloria Mann, pop singer ("Earth Angel")
- Guy Marks, actor, singer, comedian and impressionist
- Al Martino, singer ("Here in My Heart", "Volare") and actor (The Godfather, The Godfather Part III)
- Joey Merlino, alleged mafia boss of the Philadelphia crime family.
- Pat Martino, jazz guitarist and composer
- Rob McElhenney, actor and creator of "It's Always Sunny in Philadelphia"
- Meek Mill, rapper (He was born in South Philadelphia but was raised in North Philadelphia)
- N. Richard Nash, writer and dramatist (The Rainmaker)
- Fayard Nicholas, dancer (Nicholas Brothers)
- Harold Nicholas, dancer (Nicholas Brothers)
- Drew O'Keefe - U.S. Attorney for the Eastern District of Pennsylvania
- Harry Olivieri, co-inventor of the cheesesteak
- Pat Olivieri, co-inventor of the cheesesteak
- Frank Palumbo, restaurateur, humanitarian and power broker; owner of Palumbo's"
- Lisa Peluso, actress (Saturday Night Fever, Search for Tomorrow, Loving, Another World, One Life to Live)
- Vincent Persichetti, composer, pianist, teacher at the Juilliard School (students included Philip Glass, Hall Overton, Kenneth Fuchs and Thelonious Monk)
- Questlove, drummer and co-founder of The Roots
- Florence Quivar, mezzo-soprano (Metropolitan Opera, Grammy Award for Porgy and Bess)
- Peter Mark Richman, actor (Santa Barbara, Dynasty, Three's Company, Friday the 13th Part VIII: Jason Takes Manhattan)
- Frank Rizzo, mayor of Philadelphia (1972–1980)
- LaVaughn Robinson, tap dancer, choreographer (a National Endowment of the Arts "Living National Treasure" and NEA National Heritage Fellowship award)
- Bobby Rydell, singer ("Wild One", "Volare"), actor (Bye Bye Birdie), teen idol
- Jodie Sands, singer ("With All My Heart", "Someday (You'll Want Me to Want You)")
- Dee Dee Sharp, singer ("Slow Twistin'" (with Chubby Checker), "Mashed Potato Time")
- Beanie Sigel, rapper
- Bessie Smith (1894-1937), Empress of the Blues
- Frank Spellman (1922–2017), Olympic champion weightlifter
- Sylvester Stallone, actor (Rocky, Rambo, The Expendables franchises)
- Joseph Stefano, Edgar Award-winning screenwriter (Psycho)
- George Tunnell, vocalist (Jan Savitt and the Top Hatters)
- Charlie Ventura, tenor saxophonist and bandleader
- Joe Venuti, jazz violin pioneer
- Stanley Weintraub, professor, historian, and biographer
- Anne Brancato Wood, politician, the first woman to serve in the Pennsylvania House of Representatives as a Democrat

== See also ==
- Aquarama Aquarium Theater of the Sea
- Benjamin Franklin Bridge
- Franklin Delano Roosevelt Park
- Italian Market, Philadelphia
- Little Saigon, Philadelphia
- Moyamensing Prison
- Naval Hospital Philadelphia
- Philadelphia Naval Shipyard
- Sesquicentennial Exposition
- Settlement Music School
- South Philadelphia High School
- South Philadelphia Sports Complex
  - Citizens Bank Park
  - John F. Kennedy Stadium
  - Lincoln Financial Field
  - The Spectrum
  - Veterans Stadium
  - Xfinity Mobile Arena
- Walt Whitman Bridge
