= The Web (1950 TV series) =

1950s American television series

- Presented by: Jonathan Blake
- Country of origin: United States
- Original language: English
- No. of seasons: 4

Production
- Running time: 25 minutes

Original release
- Network: CBS
- Release: July 11, 1950 – September 26, 1954

The Web is an American dramatic anthology series that aired live on CBS for four seasons from July 11, 1950, to September 26, 1954. The program was produced by Mark Goodson and Bill Todman, and was narrated by Jonathan Blake. A series with the same title and a similar premise was also broadcast briefly by NBC during the summer of 1957.

Herbert Hirschman and Lela Swift directed on alternate weeks. Kent cigarettes and Embassy Cigarettes sponsored the program, which originated at WCBS-TV.

In 1951, it featured the first televised adaptation of a work by Nigel Kneale, adapted from a short story in his collection Tomato Cain & Other Stories.

The series won an Edgar Allan Poe Award.

== Synopsis ==
The dramas on The Web were all adaptations of stories written by members of the Mystery Writers of America.

== Notable appearances ==
=== Stars ===
Among the future stars who appeared on The Web are:

- Anne Bancroft, credited as Ann Marno, in The Customs of the Country [S2, E1]
- Edward Binns in St. Petersburg Dilemma [S2, E11], RX Death [S1, E30] and The Beast [S3, E16]
- John Carradine in Stone Cold Dead [S1, E26] and Golden Secret [S2, E8]
- Ray Danton in A Cry of Trumpets [S3, E28]
- James Dean in Sleeping Dogs [S2, E22]
- Brandon deWilde in The Real Thing [S3, E23] (with his father, billed as "Frederick de Wilde")
- James Gregory in All the Way to the Moon [S2, E2] and The Keyhole [S3, E5]
- Hurd Hatfield in Tiger in the Closet [S3, E3]
- Eileen Heckart in The Dishonorable Thief [S1, E60]
- Conrad Janis in "Fit to Kill" (November 19, 1950)
- Henry Jones as Mr. Fickett in The Dishonorable Thief [S1, E60]
- Grace Kelly in Mirror of Delusion [S1, E18]
- Richard Kiley in Journey By Night [S1, E17] and No Escape [S1, E52]
- Jack Lemmon in Cops Must Be Tough [S1, E48]
- E.G. Marshall in Murder's Challenge [S1, E12], The Deadly Friend [S1, E23], The Shadowy Men [S1, E36] and Sleeping Dogs [S2, E22]
- Felicia Montealegre Bernstein in Encore [S3, E40]
- Paul Newman in 'The Bells of Damon' [S3, E43] and One for the Road [S4, E1]
- Leslie Nielsen in Home For Christmas [S1, E7] and You Killed Elizabeth [S1, E30]
- Jack Palance in The Last Chance [S3, E22]
- Mark Rydell in K for Killer [S3, E6]
- Eva Marie Saint in The Last Chance [S3, E22]
- Joseph Schildkraut in A Time For Dying [S3, E24]
- Eli Wallach in Deadlock [S3, E1]
- Ray Walston in A Time For Dying [S3, E24]
- Joanne Woodward in Welcome Home [S4, E50 (final episode of the series)]

Other notable television and film actors whose careers were either launched or furthered by appearing on the series:

=== Notables, Season 1 (1950–51) ===
Wesley Addy, Denise Alexander, Robert Allen, Joseph Anthony, Bertha Belmore, Donald Buka, Don Briggs, Peter Capell, Richard Carlyle, Audrey Christie, Clay Clement, Nancy Coleman, Jerome Cowan, James Daly, James Darren, Diana Douglas (married to Kirk and mother to Michael), Mildred Dunnock, Robert Emhardt, Hugh Franklin, Jack Grimes, Preston Hanson, Russell Hardie, Will Hare, Jonathan Harris, Vinton Hayworth, Duke of Iron, George Ives, Conrad Janis, Edith King, Phyllis Kirk, Richard Kollmar, Charles Korvin, Berry Kroeger, Anna Lee, Audra Lindley, Lynn Loring, Gene Lyons, John Marley, Catherine McLeod, Meg Mundy, John Newland, Peter Pagan, Neva Patterson, Robert Pastene, John Randolph, Rex Reason, George Reeves, Maria Riva (daughter of Marlene Dietrich), Anthony Ross, Polly Rowles, Herbert Rudley, Alfred Ryder, Mary Sinclair, Howard Smith, Warren Stevens, Haila Stoddard, Mary Stuart, Murvyn Vye, Richard Webb, Roland Winters and noted television theme composer Morton Stevens (composed Hawaii Five-O (1968) theme and others).

=== Notables, Season 2 (1951–52) ===
Joseph Anthony, John Baragrey, Whit Bissell, Sidney Blackmer, Ray Boyle, John Connell, Peter Cookson, Jerome Cowan, Pat Crowley, James Daly, Charles Dingle, Mildred Dunnock, Betty Field, Paul Ford, Tamara Geva, Don Hanmer, Russell Hardie, Tom Helmore, Peter Hobbs, Anne Jackson, Edith King, Paul Langton, Jane Morgan, Lenka Peterson, William Redfield, Edmon Ryan, Alfred Ryder, Anne Seymour, Ann Shoemaker, Mary Sinclair, Edgar Stehli, Haila Stoddard, Beatrice Straight, Reba Tassell, Richard Webb, Patricia Wheel, Christine White, Perry Wilson

=== Notables, Season 3 (1952–53) ===
Wesley Addy, Joseph Anthony, Joseph Barbera as Joseph Roland, Arthur Batanides, Harry Bellaver, Sidney Blackmer, Alan Coe Bunce, Norman Burton, Frank Campanella, Connie Clausen, Patricia Collinge, Russell Collins, Ben Cooper, Joan Copeland, Adrienne Corri, Jerome Cowan, James Daly, Robert Dryden, Mildred Dunnock, Stephen Elliott, Bramwell Fletcher, Constance Ford, Virginia Gilmore, John Hamilton, Russell Hardie, Dean Harens, Michael Higgins, John Hudson, Martin Kosleck, Berry Kroeger, Wesley Lau, Audra Lindley, Alexander Lockwood, Joan Lorring, Joe Maross, Carmen Mathews, Darren McGavin, John McLiam, Eli Mintz, Dennis Patrick (as Dennis Harrison), Lloyd Richards, Robert F. Simon, Mary Sinclair, Howard St. John, Robert Sterling, Warren Stevens, Harry Townes, Richard Webb, Patricia Wheel, Perry Wilson, Bill Zuckert as William Zuckert

== Episodes ==
=== 1950–1951 ===
Partial List of Episodes of The Web (1950-1951)
Date	Episode	Actor(s)
July 4, 1950	"The Twelfth Juror"	Robert Pastene, John Shay
July 11, 1950	"The Orderly Mr. Appleby"	Selena Royle, Howard Wierum
August 1, 1950	"Help Wanted"	Howard Wierum
August 3, 1950	"Solo in Singapore"	Guy Spaull, Robert Chrisholm, Berry Kroeger, Peter Capell, Kaie Dee, and Pucille Patton.
August 8, 1950	"Heaven Ran Last"	John McQuade, Dort Clark, and Rita Lynn.
December 27, 1950	"Stone Cold Dead"	John Carradine, Duke of Iron.

=== 1952–1953 ===
Partial List of Episodes of The Web (1952–1953)
Date	Episode	Actor(s)
October 12, 1952	"Tiger in the Closet"	Hurd Hatfield, Malcolm Keen, Kathleen Comegys, Ivor Francis, James Coots
October 19, 1952	"Shadow on the Sun"	Joseph Anthony, Perry Wilson, Jimmy Sommer, Guy Spaull, John Marley, Charles Reynolds, Mario Ballo, Aaron K. Howard, Carroll Saint
October 26, 1952	"The Keyhole"	Audra Lindley, James Gregory, Susan Hallaran, Lloyd Richards, Frank Marth, John Shellie
November 2, 1952	"K For Killer"	Carmen Mathews, Ethel Penney, Mark Rydell, Allen Martin, Don White, Sandra Kagen, Elizabeth Johnson, John C. Becher, George Douth, Jay Easton, Harvey Mann
November 9, 1952	"Turn Back"	Darren McGavin, Joan Copeland, Thomas Chalmers, Thomas Heaphy, Lewis Charles, Alan Devitt, David Opatoabu, Tony Brand, Earl Dawson
November 16, 1952	"The Switch"	Jerome Cowan, Flora Campbell, Paul Potter, Royal Beal, Rudulph Justice Watson, Shirley Standlee, Anne Seaton

== Critical response ==
A review of the premiere episode in the trade publication Variety called The Web "a fair whodunit". It complimented the work of actors Robert Pastene, John Shay, and Anna Minot and "good production touches", including use of the camera as the 12th juror in a trial. The review also noted that the story "left a lot of unanswered questions" and had "some unsettled details".
