= The Web (1957 TV series) =

The Web is an American anthology series produced by Mark Goodson and Bill Todman in association with Screen Gems that aired on NBC from July 7, 1957, to September 29, 1957, as a summer replacement for The Loretta Young Show. It consisted of 13 half-hour filmed dramas that were adapted from writings of the Mystery Writers of America. Its 1958 syndication title was Undercurrent.

It was narrated by William Bryant. Guest stars included Raymond Burr, Teresa Wright, James Darren, Alexander Scourby, Joyce Meadows, and DeForest Kelley. Among its directors was Walter Doniger.

A program with the same title and a similar premise previously aired on CBS from 1950 to 1954.
