= Devil's Pocket, Philadelphia =

Neighborhood in Philadelphia, US

- Neighborhood of Philadelphia
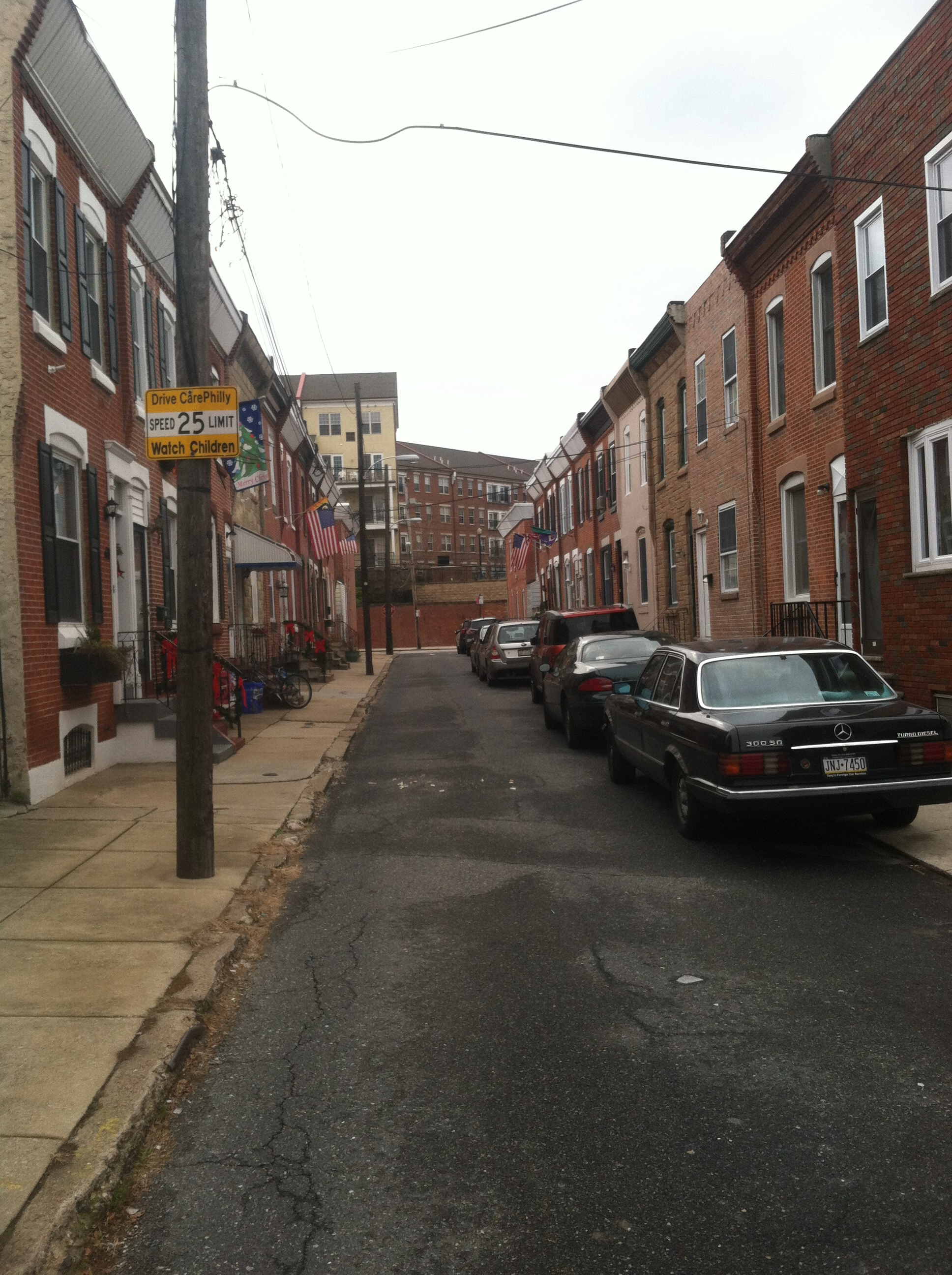
- Street in Devil’s Pocket

- Location within Philadelphia
- Coordinates: 39.942493°N 75.18609°W
- Country: United States
- State: Pennsylvania
- County: Philadelphia
- City: Philadelphia
- ZIP Code: 19146
- Area codes: 215, 267, and 445

Devil's Pocket is a small neighborhood in the South Philadelphia section of Philadelphia, Pennsylvania, United States. The neighborhood, bordered by Christian and LeCount streets, Grays Ferry Avenue, and the Naval Square development (the former U.S. Naval Asylum), consists of rowhouses tucked near an industrial landscape near the Schuylkill River. A historically Irish-American neighborhood, Devil’s Pocket has seen real estate development and gentrification in recent years, including a major expansion of the Children’s Hospital of Philadelphia.

According to one legend, Devil's Pocket got its name after a priest said the local youth were rough enough to steal from the devil’s pocket.

The 1983 novel God's Pocket by Pete Dexter and its later 2014 film adaptation are set in the fictional South Philadelphia neighborhood of God's Pocket, which is based on the real-life Devil's Pocket and its tough, working class reputation.

== See also ==
- God’s Pocket
- Hell's Kitchen, Manhattan
