= Jamboree (1957 film) =

1957 film by Roy Lockwood

- Mexican release poster
- Directed by: Roy Lockwood
- Written by: Leonard Kantor; Milton Subotsky
- Produced by: Max Rosenberg; Milton Subotsky
- Starring: Dick Clark; Frankie Avalon; Fats Domino; Charlie Gracie; Buddy Knox; Jerry Lee Lewis; Carl Perkins; Slim Whitman; Ron Coby
- Cinematography: Jack Etra
- Edited by: Robert Broekman
- Music by: Neal Hefti
- Production company: Vanguard Pictures
- Distributed by: Warner Bros.
- Release date: 1957
- Running time: 86 minutes
- Country: United States
- Language: English

Jamboree, known as Disc Jockey Jamboree in the United Kingdom, is a 1957 American rock and roll film directed by Roy Lockwood. Its story is about a boy and girl, Pete Porter and Honey Wynn (played respectively by Paul Carr and Freda Holloway), who become overnight sensations as a romantic singing duo who run into trouble when their squabbling managers (Kay Medford and Bob Pastene), try to turn them into solo acts. Against this backdrop in cameo performances appear some of the biggest names of rock and roll in the 1950s lip-syncing to their recordings.

== Overview ==
Jamboree was among several musical films intended to capitalize on the popularity of rock and roll music, and appears to have derived its name from a show hosted by disc jockey Alan Freed that began airing over Radio Luxembourg in 1956, with Freed recording his featured segments while working for WINS in New York City. A rivalry developed during this time between Freed and Philadelphia DJ Dick Clark, who both appear in this film. Freed had pioneered rock and roll package tours as well as rock and roll movies (Rock Around the Clock, Don't Knock the Rock and Rock, Rock, Rock); however, U.S. Congressional hearings into payola practices in radio broadcasting eventually ruined Freed's career, while Clark's career was uninterrupted.

Jamboree was essentially a film where the storyline (romance and rivalry between two young rising singers and their managers) was secondary to the musical performances, and the film gained historical importance due to appearances by various performers and DJs.

== Featured stars ==
Jamboree features influential American disc jockeys Alan Freed and Dick Clark appearing as themselves, along with a roster of international DJs in cameo roles and several leading rock, pop and country & rockabilly acts of the time. Clark acts as the host for a televised musical variety show within the film, with performances by Fats Domino ("Wait and See"); Buddy Knox ("Hula Love"); Jimmy Bowen ("Cross Over"); Charlie Gracie ("Cool Baby"); Jerry Lee Lewis ("Great Balls of Fire", in a version different from his Sun 45 release); Louis Lymon and the Teenchords ("Your Last Chance"); Carl Perkins ("Glad All Over"); Jodie Sands ("Sayonara"); Frankie Avalon ("Teacher's Pet"); Slim Whitman ("Unchain My Heart"); The Four Coins ("A Broken Promise"); and Count Basie and His Orchestra, with Joe Williams on vocals ("I Don't Like You No More"). Connie Francis overdubbed Freda Holloway's singing voice for the film, a taske she had previously provided on the film Rock! Rock! Rock!

Carl Perkins (second from left) performing "Glad All Over" with (left to right) Clayton Perkins, W.S. "Fluke" Holland, and Jay Perkins

The cast also includes hit songwriter Aaron Schroeder (as The Songwriter); and cameo appearances by Brazilian singer Cauby Peixoto (as Ron Coby) and British bandleaders Jack Jackson (host of the Decca Records show on Radio Luxembourg) and Jack Payne, among other radio personalities. Clark is shown hosting the "second hour" of a "United Charities" telethon to raise money to fight what is described only as "this dreaded disease". Clark introduces various disc jockeys from across the U.S. and Canada, who then introduce the featured acts. (He is listed in the film's disc jockey credits as a DJ at WFIL in Philadelphia, the city where, at the time, he also hosted the original local program that would become American Bandstand.) Later in the film, DJs Jackson (ATV) and Payne (BBC) in London, Werner Goetze (Bayerischer Rundfunk) in Munich, and Chris Howland (Westdeutscher Rundfunk) in Cologne are shown introducing records by "Pete and Honey" on the air. Finally, performances are the entertainment at a convention of the Music Operators of America, a group of jukebox owners that bought 150 records per week in the 1950s.

== Cast ==
- Alan Freed as Disc-jockey
- Fats Domino as Himself
- Jerry Lee Lewis as Himself
- Jimmy Bowen as Himself
- Jack Jackson as Himself
- Buddy Knox as Himself
- Charlie Gracie as Himself
- Joe Williams as Himself
- Jodie Sands as Herself
- Frankie Avalon as Himself
- Lewis Lymon and the Teenchords as Teen Group Band
- Slim Whitman as Himself
- Carl Perkins as Himself
- Jack Payne as Himself
- Andy Martin as Himself
- Aaron Schroeder as Songwriter
- The Four Coins as Singing Group
- Cauby Peixoto as Ron Coby
- Rocco and his Saints as Rock band
- Connie Francis as Herself
- Kay Medford as Gracie Show
- Robert Pastene as Lew Arthur
- Paul Carr as Peter Porter
- Freda Holloway as Honey Wynn
- David King-Wood as Warren Sykes
- Jean Martin as Cindy Sykes, Asst. Mgr.
- Tony Travis as Stage Manager
- Leonard Schneider as Asst. Stage Mgr.
- Ed Bonner as Disc-jockey, St. Louis
- Joe Finan as Disc-jockey, Cleveland
- Dick Clark as Disc-jockey, Philadelphia
- Milt Grant as Disc-jockey, Washington
- Jocko Henderson as Disc-jockey, New York

== Production ==
The film was produced by Milton Subotsky and Max Rosenberg who had previously made the successful Rock, Rock, Rock!. Warner Bros had the foreign distribution rights for that film and decided to invest in another rock film. Rosenberg said "Jamboree was a studio picture. We had quote a plot unquote and we had recognizable actors. It was shot on the old Fox studio at Tenth Avenue and 56th Street. It was probably a three-week shoot.”

Subotsky said "The idea we had was to have a group of DJs across the US and Canada introducing as many of the top rockers as we could line up. It only meant a couple of days filming for most of the acts, and we just brought them into the studios and put them before the cameras and had them do their latest hit records." The producers wanted Buddy Holly but his manager turned down the offer.

Investors in the film included Bob Marcucci, Bermie Binnick and Dick Clark.

Subotsky later claimed the serious plot was insisted upon by Warner Bros. He reflected "Adding a serious plot like that to a musical can be deadly. I don't think Jamboree worked that well because every time a musical number occurred, it fought the story".

Warner Brothers Records made a small number of copies of the movie sound-track album, which were sent to disc jockeys as a promotional tool. However the artists were upset with the billing so Warner Bros decided to cancel plans to release the disc commercially. The promotional albums are the only copies left of the Jamboree soundtrack.

== Songs ==
- A Broken Promise (Four Coins)
- Cool Baby (Charlie Gracie)
- Crazy to Care (Mary Lou Harp)
- Cross Over (Jimmy Bowen)
- For Children of All Ages (Connie Francis)
- Glad All Over (Carl Perkins)
- Great Balls of Fire (Jerry Lee Lewis)
- Hula Love (Buddy Knox)
- I Don't Like You No More (Joe Williams)
- If Not for You (Paul Carr)
- Jamboree (Count Basie);
- One O'clock Jump (Count Basie);
- Record Hop Tonight (Andy Martin)
- Siempre (Connie Francis)
- Teacher's Pet (Frankie Avalon, Rocco and the Saints);
- Toreador (Ron Colby)
- Twenty Four Hours a Day (Paul Carr, Connie Francis)
- Unchain My Heart (Slim Whitman)
- Wait and See (Fats Domino)
- Who Are We to Say (Paul Carr, Connie Francis)
- Your Last Chance (Louis Lymon and the Teenchords)

== Reception ==
Variety called the film "old-fashioned in concept, reminiscent of the early days of talking pictures when producers slapped a group of singing acts together; Perhaps okay for program situations where younger patrons like their vocalistics. Technical credits are all good."

Filmink called it "one of a number of low budget rock’n’roll movies made around this time, which took a thin story and shoved them full of musical acts."

== See also ==
- List of American films of 1957
