= The Matchmaker (1958 film) =

1958 film by Joseph Anthony

- Theatrical release poster
- Directed by: Joseph Anthony
- Screenplay by: John Michael Hayes
- Based on: The Matchmaker by Thornton Wilder
- Produced by: Don Hartman
- Starring: Shirley Booth; Anthony Perkins; Shirley MacLaine; Paul Ford
- Cinematography: Charles Lang
- Edited by: Howard Smith
- Music by: Adolph Deutsch
- Distributed by: Paramount Pictures
- Release date: July 23, 1958
- Running time: 101 minutes
- Country: United States
- Language: English
- Box office: $1 million (US and Canada rentals)

The Matchmaker is a 1958 American romantic comedy film directed by Joseph Anthony from a screenplay by John Michael Hayes, based on the 1954 play by Thornton Wilder. The film stars Shirley Booth in her final film, Anthony Perkins, Shirley MacLaine, and Paul Ford. The costumes were by Edith Head.

== Plot ==
Set in 1884, the story focuses on Dolly Gallagher Levi, a widow who supports herself by a variety of means, with matchmaking as her primary source of income. Horace Vandergelder, a wealthy but miserly merchant from Yonkers, New York, has hired her to find him a wife, but unbeknownst to him, Dolly is determined to fill the position herself. When he expresses his intent to travel to New York City to woo milliner Irene Molloy, Dolly shows him the photograph of a woman she calls Miss Ernestina Simple and tells him the buxom beauty would be a far better choice for him. Horace agrees to have dinner with Ernestina at the Harmonia Gardens after visiting Irene.

Meanwhile, Horace's head clerk, Cornelius Hackl convinces his sidekick Barnaby Tucker that they too, deserve an outing to New York. The two cause cans of tomatoes to explode, spewing their contents about the store, which justifies their closing it for the day and heading to the city. While there, they come across Irene's hat shop, and Cornelius is instantly taken with her. The pair are forced to hide when Mr. Vandergelder and Dolly arrive. Though Dolly and Irene cover up for them, Mr. Vandergelder still realizes that Irene is hiding people in her shop (though he doesn't know who) and leaves in disgust. Irene furiously demands that Cornelius and Barnaby repay her by taking her and the shop assistant, Minnie out to a fancy restaurant for dinner (Dolly had led her to believe that the men were secretly members of high society).

By total coincidence, Cornelius, Barnaby, Irene, Minnie, Horace, and Dolly all dine at the same restaurant. Horace realizes that Dolly tricked him and that there is no such person as Ernestina Simple. Cornelius worries over how to pay for the meal until a well-meaning diner gives him Mr. Vandergelder's wallet (which the diner believes Cornelius dropped). Over the course of the evening, Irene and Cornelius fall in love as Barnaby falls for Minnie. The two men escape being caught by Mr. Vandergelder by disguising themselves as women and dancing towards the door. Before going, they leave the two women a note confessing who they really are and that they love them.

The next day, Dolly and Cornelius pretend to be setting up a store of their own across the street from Mr. Vandergelders. Frightened by the competition, Horace gives the shopkeepers better working hours and wages. Realizing how foolishly he's been acting, he agrees to marry Dolly as well.

== Cast ==
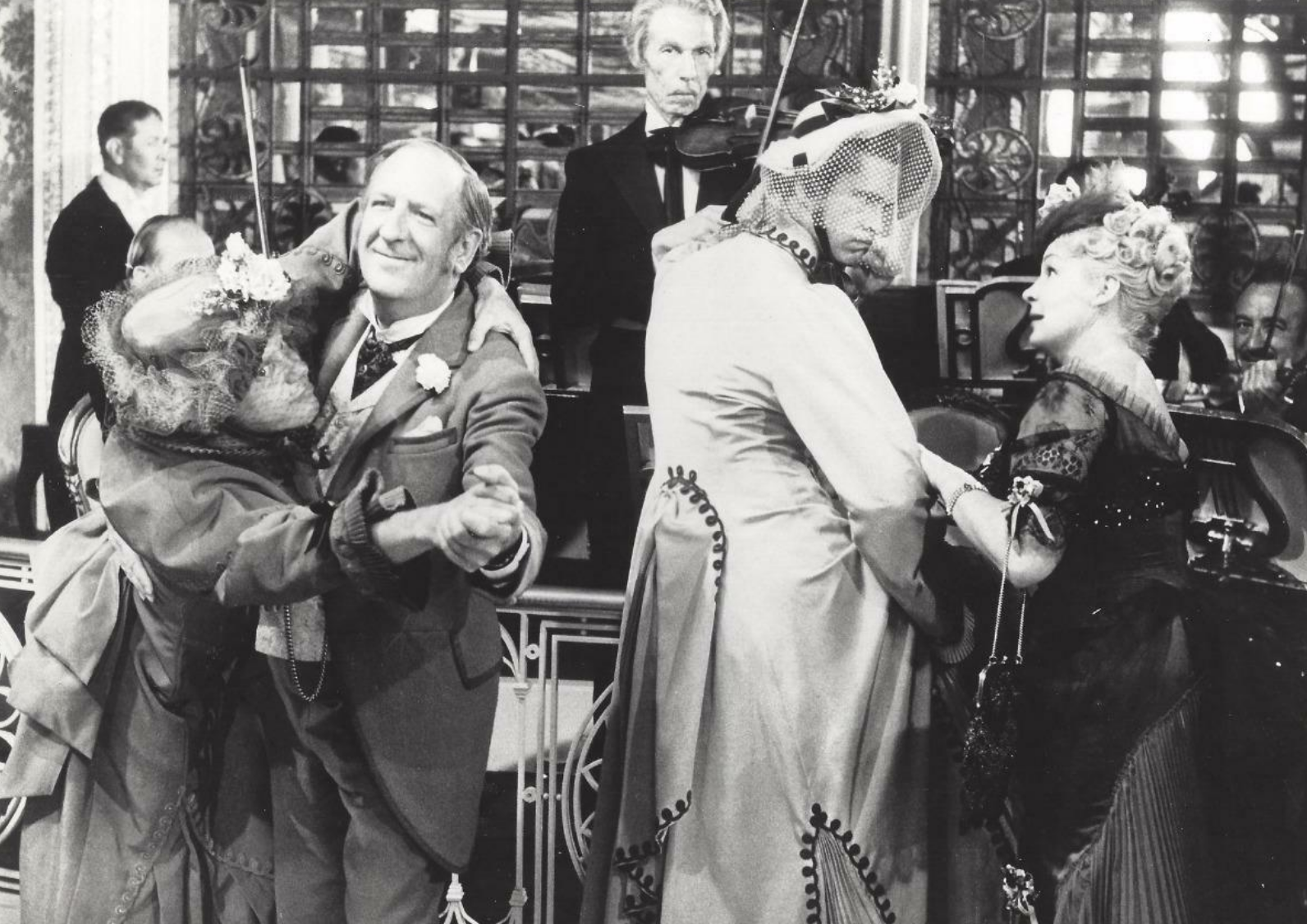
L–R: Robert Morse, Paul Ford, Anthony Perkins, and Shirley Booth in The Matchmaker

- Shirley Booth as Dolly Levi
- Anthony Perkins as Cornelius Hackl
- Shirley MacLaine as Irene Molloy
- Paul Ford as Horace Vandergelder
- Robert Morse as Barnaby Tucker
- Perry Wilson as Minnie Fay
- Wallace Ford as Malachi Stack
- Russell Collins as Joe Scanlon
- Rex Evans as August
- Gavin Gordon as Rudolph
- Torben Meyer as Alex the headwaiter

== Production ==
Don Hartman acquired the story for Paramount Pictures and took it over when he left Paramount to become an independent producer. He died shortly before its release.

== Reception ==
Stanley Kauffmann of The New Republic wrote, "The film-script by John Michael Hayes condenses and alters the original but not in any outrageous fashion; it is the director and actors who fail it."

== See also ==
- Hello, Dolly! (1969)
- List of American films of 1958
- Matchmaking
