= Granoff School of Music =

Music school in Pennsylvania, United States

Coordinates: 39.951517°N 75.168832°W

- Philadelphia, Pennsylvania; United States

Information
- Founder: Isadore Granoff

The Granoff School of Music was a music school in Philadelphia, Pennsylvania. It was founded by Isadore Granoff (1902 - 2000), a Ukrainian immigrant.

Alumni of Granoff include Dizzy Gillespie, Sonny Fortune, McCoy Tyner and John Coltrane. Some of his students later became well-known classical, jazz, swing, big band and Latin musicians.
