= Gondolier (song) =

- Cover of EP

Single by Dalida
- Released: December 1957
- Recorded: December 9, 1957
- Studio: Hoche
- Genre: Chanson; exotica
- Length: 2:55
- Label: Barclay
- Composer: Pete DeAngelis
- Lyricist: Jean Broussolle

"Gondolier" is a song by the French singer Dalida, first released on an EP in December 1957. It was her second major hit after "Bambino". Reaching No. 1 on both the La Bourse des Chansons chart and the Music Hall chart in France, it was the title song for Dalida's 1958 album Gondolier. The song also reached No. 1 on the Belgian and Canadian charts.

== Description ==
The song's melody was composed by Peter De Angelis with lyrics by Jean Broussolle. It was released as a promotional single on February 22, 1957, but it received no promotion because of the prolonged success of "Bambino".

As the song did not reach its audience, De Angelis and his colleague Bob Marcucci wrote the English language version which gained success in the US and UK in mid-1957. During an interview in 1958, Dalida said, "I heard on radio Petula Clark singing it in English, and I like it very much so I decided to use the song for my Christmas special show."

At the end of 1957, Dalida used "Gondolier" as the title song of a French TV Christmas special, in which she was the main attraction. The song was issued on EP the next day and it gained instant success. It entered the charts at No. 1 in the first week of January 1958, and eventually spent 53 weeks in the top 20, until the last week of December 1958. It spent 9 weeks as No. 1 in January and February and again reached No. 1 for 10 weeks during the summer, earning Dalida her third gold disc.

Eventually, it became the most sold record of 1958; promotions through TV and concert performances made the song a pop standard in France and one of Dalida's signature tracks.

== Cover versions ==
"Gondolier" has been covered by many artists.

In English, the song has been recorded by several artists under the title "With All My Heart", including:

- Jodie Sands recorded the first version in English, released in April or May 1957. It reached No. 1 in Belgium and was her only major hit in the United States (reaching No. 15 on the Billboard Pop Singles chart in 1957).
- Petula Clark released it in June or July 1957 in Belgium and the United Kingdom (it reached No. 4 on the UK Singles Chart), which was before she became known in the US.
- Judy Scott in 1957.
- Eve Boswell in 1957.
- Dave King in 1957.
- Bing Crosby in 1958.
- Betty Curtis in Italian titled "Con tutto il cuore" in 1958.
- Dawn Robertson in 1977 released a disco version as a maxi-single.

== Charts ==
Chart	Peak position
Belgium (Ultratop Flanders)	1
Belgium (Ultratop Wallonia)	1
Canada	1
France (Bourse des chansons)	1
France (Music Hall Charts)	1

== Bibliography ==
- Daniel Lesueur, L'argus Dalida: Discographie mondiale et cotations, Éditions Alternatives, 2004. ISBN 2-86227-428-3 and ISBN 978-2-86227-428-7. (in French)
