= Joseph Anthony =

American playwright, actor, and director (1912–1993)

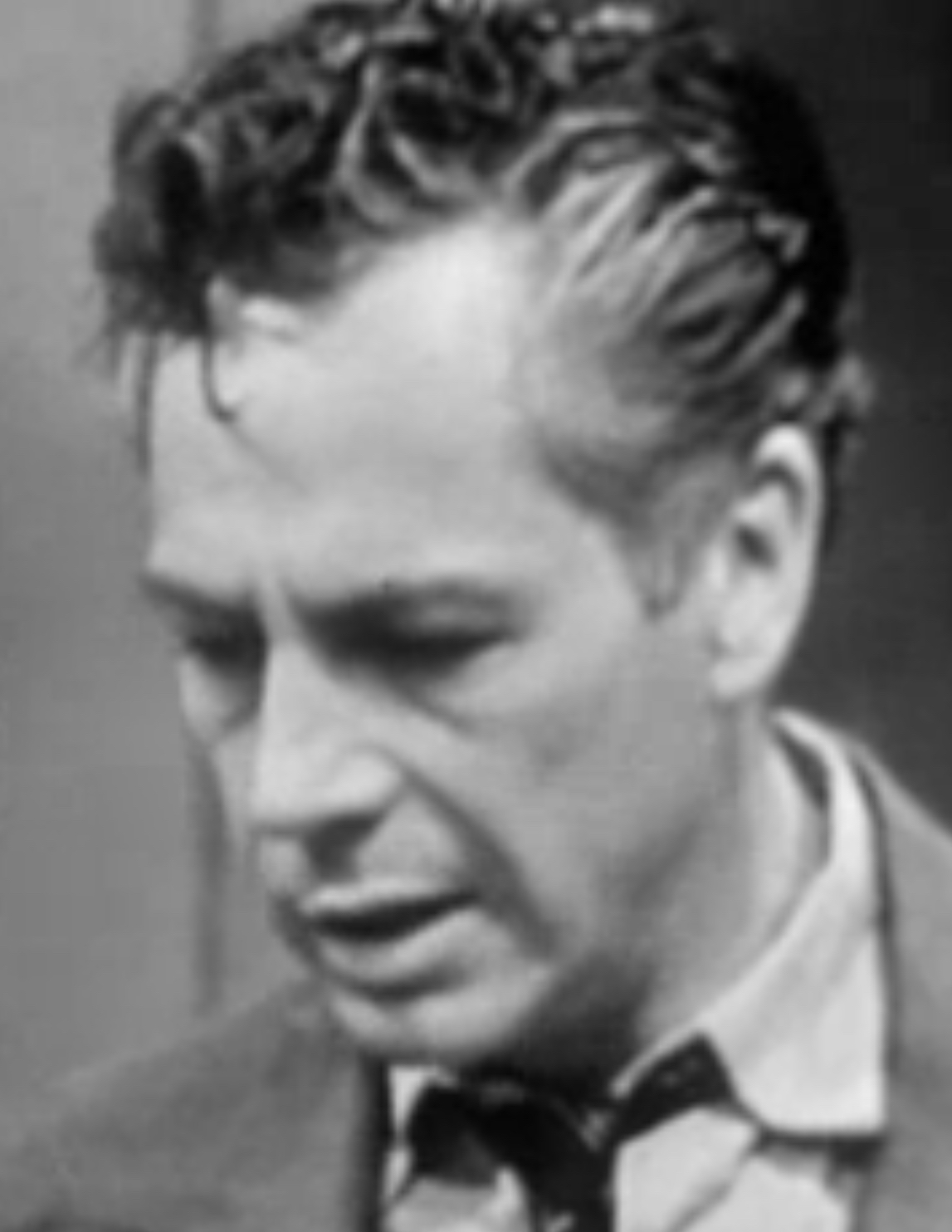
- Born: Joseph Deuster; May 24, 1912; Milwaukee, Wisconsin, U.S.
- Died: January 20, 1993 (aged 80); Hyannis, Massachusetts, U.S.
- Occupations: Playwright; actor; director
- Spouse: Perry Wilson (1942 - )

Joseph Anthony (born Joseph Deuster; May 24, 1912 – January 20, 1993) was an American playwright, actor, and director. He made his film acting debut in the 1934 film Hat, Coat, and Glove and his theatrical acting debut in a 1935 production of Mary of Scotland. On five occasions he was nominated for a Tony Award for Best Direction.

== Biography ==
Joseph Anthony married Perry Wilson on August 2, 1942, in New York City. He prepared for the stage at the Pasadena Playhouse from 1931 to 1935 and at the Daykarhanova School from 1935 to 1937. Anthony served in the United States Army during World War II from 1942 to 1946. He trained at Camp Ritchie and its Composite School Unit. On January 20, 1993, Joseph Anthony died at the age of 80 in a nursing home in Hyannis, Massachusetts.

== Career ==
=== Stage work ===
Joseph Anthony, then appearing under his original name of Joseph Deuster, made his professional acting debut in 1935 playing the role of Rizzio in a production of Mary of Scotland. In 1937 he appeared in the touring production of Dead End. He went on to make his first New York City appearance two years later with the Federal Theatre Project Company playing the title role in a production of Professor Mamlock at Daly's 63rd Street Theatre. After returning from service in World War II, Anthony reappeared on Broadway under the name Joseph Adams at the Belasco Theatre as the Second Man in a 1946 production of Truckline Cafe. He first performed under the name Joseph Anthony in January 1948 at the Maxine Elliott Theatre in a production of Skipper Next to God. He continued to perform under this name through the 1950s, appearing in such original Broadway theatre productions as "The Country Girl", 1951, at the Lyceum Theatre, NYC, Flight into Egypt in 1952, Camino Real in 1953, and Anastasia in 1954.

Joseph Anthony made his New York City directorial debut in April 1948 directing a production of Celebration at the Maxine Elliott Theatre. In 1954, Anthony directed the original production of The Rainmaker (a play of which he would later direct the film adaptation), and, in 1955, The Lark. From March 1960 through March 1961, Anthony successfully opened the original Broadway productions of four shows which ran simultaneously: The Best Man at the Morosco Theatre, Under the Yum Yum Tree at Henry Miller's Theatre, Rhinoceros at the Longacre Theatre, and Mary, Mary at the Helen Hayes Theatre. Mary, Mary was Anthony's longest-running production, lasting nearly four years and more than 1500 performances. Anthony also directed several other original Broadway productions, including Romulus in 1962, Slow Dance on the Killing Ground in 1964, Jimmy in 1969, and the notoriously unsuccessful Breakfast at Tiffany's in 1966.

=== Film work ===
Joseph Anthony first major film appearance was in Hat, Coat, and Glove in 1934. He went on to appear in She in 1935, Shadow of the Thin Man in 1941, and Joe Smith, American in 1942. Anthony's first film direction was the 1956 film adaptation of The Rainmaker, a play he also directed. Anthony also directed such films as The Matchmaker in 1958, Career in 1959, All in a Night's Work in 1961, and Tomorrow in 1972.

== Awards and nominations ==
Year	Award	Category	Work	Result
1956	Tony Award	Best Director	The Lark	Nominated
1957	Tony Award	Best Director	A Clearing in the Woods	Nominated
1957	Tony Award	Best Director	The Most Happy Fella	Nominated
1957	Blue Ribbon Awards	Best Picture of the Month for the Whole Family (February)	The Rainmaker	Won
1960	Tony Award	Best Direction of a Play	The Best Man	Nominated
1961	Tony Award	Best Direction of a Play	Rhinoceros	Nominated
1964	Tony Award	Best Direction of a Musical	110 in the Shade	Nominated
