= Robert Pastene =

American actor (1918–1991)

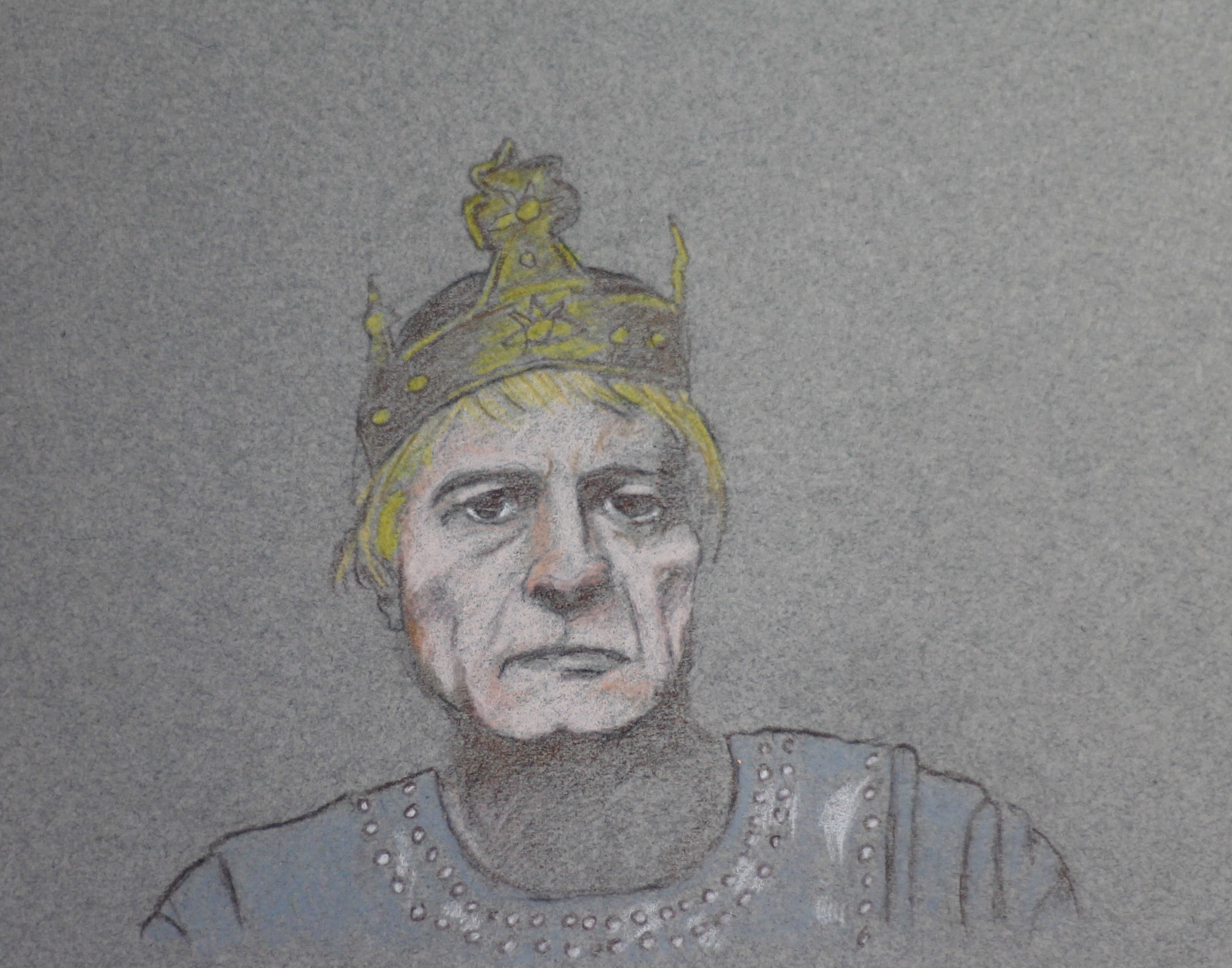
- Robert Pastene as the title character in Pirandello's play Enrico IV
- Born: January 29, 1918
- Died: October 15, 1991 (aged 73)
- Occupation: Actor

Robert Pastene (January 29, 1918 – October 15, 1991) was an American actor who appeared films, television and on stage. He acted in a variety of television dramas during what is known as the Golden Age of Television throughout the 1950s and 60s. On Broadway he performed in plays by Shakespeare, Strindberg, Brecht, Aeschylus, Shaw and Lillian Hellman. In the 1960s and 70s he had a significant career at the Guthrie Theater in Minneapolis, which began in 1963 with the theater’s inaugural season.

== Stage ==
In 1963, Pastene appeared as Polonius in Shakespeare’s Hamlet at the Guthrie Theater. It was the first production at the new theater, it was directed by Tyrone Guthrie, and it featured George Grizzard in the title role, and Jessica Tandy as Gertrude. He then went on to play many roles at the Guthrie, in dramas and comedies, modern and classic. He played Henry in Pirandello’s play Enrico IV, a production that also featured Michael Moriarty and Gale Sondergaard.

The actress, Zoe Caldwell, acted with Pastene at the Guthrie Theater several times, including productions of Chekov’s Three Sisters and Shakespeare’s Hamlet. She describes him in her memoir, I Will Be Cleopatra; An Actress’s Journey:

Pastene is a tall, elegant man, who for reasons known only to himself, keeps his head on one side. Sometimes more, sometimes less. It doesn't matter because he is one of the best actors in the world. All the equipment is his. He is dangerous, intelligent, articulate, and beautiful, and has a well of sadness to draw from. Wit is his easy companion. He keeps himself away from the big cities of the world and so he will never have a Tony, an Oscar, an agent, or a big bank account, but he will forever have my admiration and respect because I have never seen him play any role that he did not totally define.”

He first appeared on Broadway in 1945, in a production of the comedy The First Crocus; the cast also included Jocelyn Brando. In his second appearance on Broadway, in 1947, was in a production of Hamlet, which starred Maurice Evans in the title role. He performed in the 1952 Broadway production of Lillian Hellman’s play The Children’s Hour as Dr. Joseph Cardin. Hellman also directed the play. Cast member, Patricia Neal, said the author could be quite a brutal director, and that Pastene bore the brunt of Hellman’s lashing out, which, as related by Neal and Christopher Plummer, supposedly gave Pastene a permanent crick in his neck.

In 1947 Pastene appeared in the Broadway production Crime and Punishment in a cast that also included John Gielgud, Lillian Gish, Sanford Meisner, Alexander Scourby and Marian Seldes.

He appeared in off-Broadway plays, including the 1949 Lenox Hill Playhouse production of George Bernard Shaw’s play Saint Joan, with Kim Stanley playing Joan. Two years later he appeared in the same play, Saint Joan, and in the same role, but this time it was on Broadway with Uta Hagen playing Joan.

Pastene appeared in 1973 at the McCarter Theatre in a production of John Osborne’s play The Entertainer, earning very positive reviews.

== Television ==
In television he appeared in a variety of dramas. His biography for the theatre program of The Children’s Hour, states: "TV, he confesses, has been his mutton. In three years’ service in the infant medium he has played everything from Abraham Lincoln (Studio One) to the title role in Buck Rogers in the 25th Century. The Studio One production of Abraham Lincoln also includes a 21 year old James Dean in the cast.

== Personal life ==
Pastene was born in Brockton, Massachusetts. Towards the end of the run of the Broadway production of The Children’s Hour, Pastene travelled a few miles north to Greenwich, Connecticut, to marry the singer and actress Susan Johnson, on May 11, 1953. At the time she was performing at Le Ruban Blue, a nightclub on the upper east side of Manhattan. Later they divorced.

== Selected filmography ==
Year	Title	Role	Notes
1950-1951	Buck Rogers in the 25th Century	Buck Rogers	
1957	Jamboree	Lew Arthur	
1960	BUtterfield 8	Tipsy Man	Uncredited
