= Perry Wilson =

American actress

- Born: Mary Elizabeth Wilson; July 13, 1916; Bound Brook, New Jersey, U.S.
- Died: December 30, 2009 (aged 93); Chestnut Hill, Massachusetts, U.S.
- Occupation: Actress
- Years active: 1936–1962
- Spouse: Joseph Anthony (m. 1942; died 1993)

Perry Wilson Anthony (born Mary Elizabeth Wilson; July 13, 1916 – December 30, 2009) was an American actress most active during the 1950s and 1960s. She was best known for her role in the 1957 film Fear Strikes Out.

== Early life and education ==
Perry was born Mary Elizabeth Wilson on July 13, 1916, in Bound Brook, New Jersey. She was raised by her parents, Dorothy Roe and Edward Arthur Wilson, a noted illustrator. In 1922, the family moved to Truro, Massachusetts. Wilson changed her first name to Perry when she was 13 years old. She was a Christian Scientist. Wilson attended the Tamara Daykarhanova School for the Stage in New York City. where she met her future husband, Joseph Anthony.

== Career ==
Wilson and Anthony co-founded the American Actors Company in 1938. The company's first performance was The Trojan Women, which co-starred Mildred Dunnock and Horton Foote. Wilson married Anthony in 1942, seven years after they first met. Wilson's Broadway credits included Cream in the Well, which was directed by Mary Hunter and written by Lynn Riggs. She also appeared on Broadway in The First Crocus, Pillar to Post, Village Green, and His and Hers. Wilson toured nationally with Ethel Barrymore in the production of The Corn is Green, in which she portrayed Bessie Watty. Her film credits included the 1957 film, Fear Strikes Out, co-starring Karl Malden and Tony Perkins. She also appeared in the films, The Matchmaker. On television, Wilson appeared in episodes of The United States Steel Hour, Naked City, The Philco-Goodyear Television Playhouse, The Defenders and the Kraft Mystery Theatre.

== Personal life ==
Wilson met her husband, Joseph Anthony, at Tamara Daykarhanova School for the Stage in New York City. They married on August 3, 1942, in New York City. They remained married until his death in 1993.

She largely retired from acting after the birth of her two children, Ellen Anthony and Peter Anthony. She took up painting and studied with Jerry Farnsworth in Truro, Massachusetts. Her paintings focused largely on landscape scenes. She later retired to her home in Truro, Massachusetts.

== Death ==
Perry Wilson died at the Chestnut Hill Benevolent Association in Chestnut Hill, Massachusetts, on December 30, 2009, at the age of 93. She was survived by her children and grandchildren.

== Filmography ==
Year	Title	Role	Notes
1957	Fear Strikes Out	Mrs. John Piersall	
1958	The Matchmaker	Minnie Fay	
