= Jodie Sands =

American singer

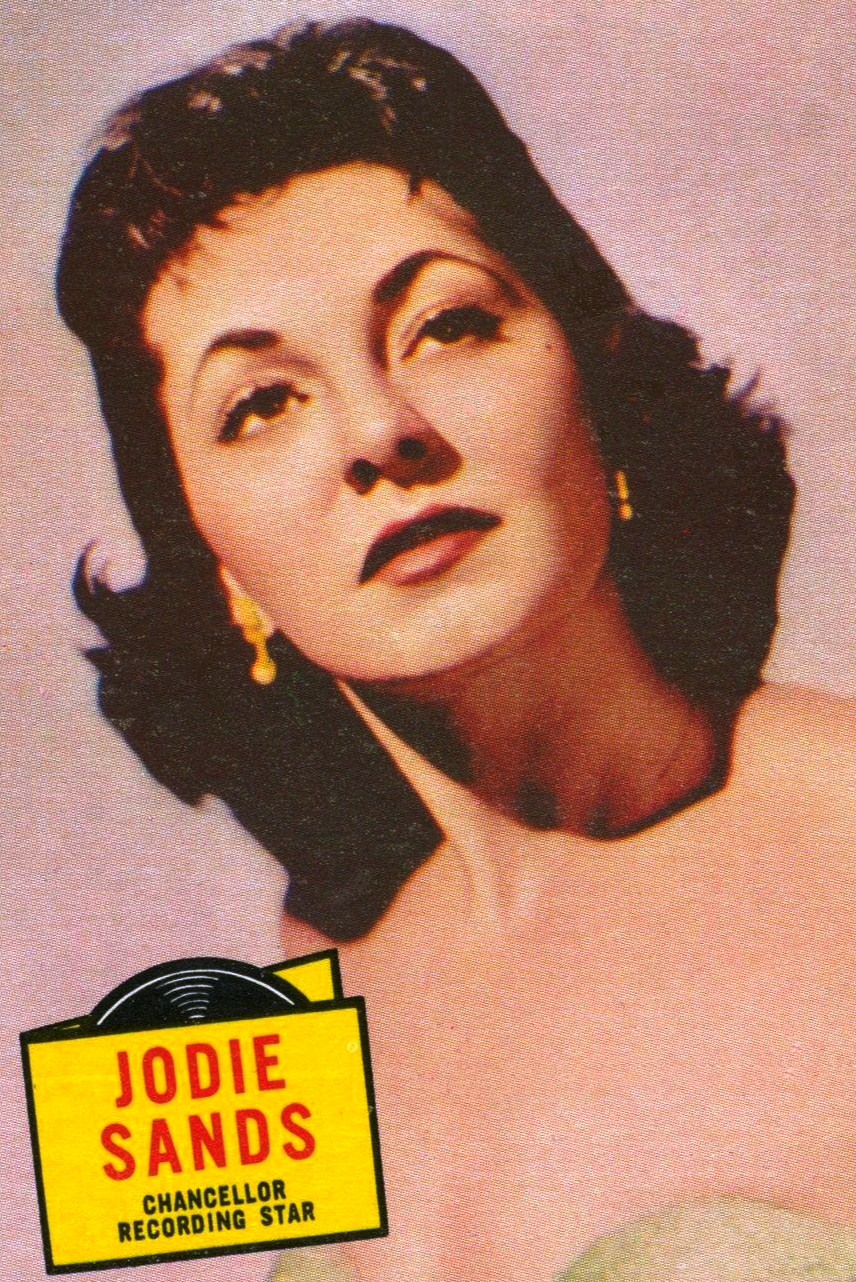
- Sands in 1957.

Background information
- Born: Eleanor DiSipio c. 1927; Philadelphia, Pennsylvania, U.S.
- Died: 2015
- Genre: Traditional pop
- Occupation: Singer
- Years active: c. 1955–c. 1975
- Label: Chancellor

Jodie Sands (born Eleanor DiSipio c. 1927) is an American singer of popular music.

== Biography ==
Eleanor DiSipio was born in Philadelphia, Pennsylvania in 1927/1928, to Rocco (born 1886) and Angelina DiSipio (née Cattefesta, 1891–1966). Her father was an opera singer, and she trained in the hope of following the same career. She worked in clubs in the United States and Canada in the early 1950s, and she appeared on local television shows in Philadelphia. She also started making recordings for Chancellor Records.

Sands had only one major hit, "With All My Heart", an English cover version of "Gondolier", which reached No. 15 on the Billboard Hot 100 chart in 1957. Her next recording "Someday (You'll Want Me to Want You)" barely made the Top 100 chart the following year, reaching No. 95, but did better in the United Kingdom, where it reached No. 14 in the UK Singles Chart. She toured with Alan Freed's cohort of stars, including Chuck Berry and the Everly Brothers, and in Hawaii with Jerry Lee Lewis, Buddy Holly, and Paul Anka. She also appeared in the 1957 film Jamboree.

By 1962, she signed for ABC-Paramount Records, but none of her later recordings were successful. She continued to perform in clubs until at least 1975.

Death notices for her siblings in 1996 and 2000, refer to Sands by the name of Eleanor Ferro.

== Notable songs ==
- "With All My Heart" (1957)
- "Someday (You'll Want Me to Want You)" (1958)
- "Love Me Forever" (1958)

== Filmography ==
- American Bandstand (1957)
- Jamboree (1957)
