= Kirkbride School =

Kirkbride School may refer to:

- Kirkbride Primary School in Kirkbride, Wigton, Cumbria, England
- Eliza B. Kirkbride School in Philadelphia, Pennsylvania, USA
- Kirkbride School in Surrey, BC, Canada - Surrey Schools
