= Building Little Italy =

1998 book by Richard N. Juliani

- Author: Richard N. Juliani
- Language: English
- Genre: Logic
- Publisher: Penn State University Press
- Publication date: 1998
- Pages: 422
- ISBN: 978-0271-0286-44

Building Little Italy: Philadelphia's Italians before Mass Migration is a 1998 nonfiction book by Villanova University sociologist professor Richard N. Juliani, published by Penn State University Press. The book discusses Italian immigration to Philadelphia, Pennsylvania from its beginnings in the 1750s through the 1870s. The book discusses the individual Italian Americans and the social issues the early Italian American community faced.

John Zucchi of McGill University wrote that Building Little Italy was against the practice of being filiopietistic, or members of an ethnic group emphasizing "the presence of their "tribe" in a particular locale from the early history of a European presence in that locus" in order "to bolster the community or to respond to a perceived self-disesteem of their ethnic group". Stefano Luconi of the University of Florence wrote that this book differed from a trend of most research of Italian Americans being "a hagiographic defense of Italian immigrants' contributions to the cultural, political, and economic development of American society to counter negative stereotypes of Italians as foreigners incapable of assimilation into their adoptive country."

== Background ==
Juliani is a professor of sociology at Villanova University. Juliani began his research career in the mid-1960s, and had researched Philadelphia's Italian community for 30 years prior to the publication of the book.

The book uses many sources related to Father Antonio Isoleri, who, from 1870 through 1926, served as the pastor of an Italian American church in Little Italy, Saint Mary Magdalen dei Pazzi Church, America's first Italian ethnic church. These sources include notes, sermons, letters, plays, and poems, with a total of over 20,000 pages. Other sources used include newspapers, Immigration and Naturalization Services (INS) documents, and U.S. Census documents.

As of 1999, the Italians in the United States in the 1880-1940 and post 1940 periods had received more scholarly attention than those pre-1880, and as of 2000 most researchers begin at 1880. The book's subjects are skilled northern Italians, while the more commonly studied later immigrants were mostly southern Italians who had less skills and education than the previous group.

== Contents ==
The book has an introduction and eight chapters. The first describes what is known about the people who lived in the earliest Italian settlements in Philadelphia while chapters two through eight discuss how the community evolved. The book has one chapter dedicated to Little Italy during the discussed time period; Zucchi stated that this chapter "is particularly useful as a reconstruction of an ethnic neighbourhood." The book also discusses how Philadelphia's Italian community responded to the American Civil War and the Italian unification, and Michael Miller Topp of the University of Texas El Paso argued that this "political dimension" was "one of the greatest strengths of his book." The book's content ends at the 1870 Census. The book also has a bibliographic essay, titled "Authenticating an Early Presence," and an appendix.

Supplementary materials include scans of documents, maps, and photographs. Documents include assessment rolls, census records, city directories, church registers, naturalization records, newspapers, and wills. One of the documents is the 1870 manuscript census. Charles L. Flynn, Jr. of Assumption College described the second half of the book as "richer" since it describes a fully formed Italian community and uses the manuscript census and other sources generated during the period.

Donna R. Gabaccia of University of North Carolina at Charlotte wrote that "The strength of Juliani's study is his ability to tease out the implications of these early years of migration and settlement for the subsequent history of Philadelphia's Little Italy."

Salvatore J. Lagumina of Nassau Community College wrote that Juliani "correctly describes" the early Philadelphia Italian community; Lagumina wrote that Juliani was forced to use "deductive reasoning" and "tentative conclusions" due to a lack of quality archives, a paucity of known primary sources, and differences in spelling of names. Topp stated that this lack of evidence had hampered the quality of the book's initial two chapters.

== Reception ==
Joseph J. Casino of the Archives of the Roman Catholic Archdiocese of Philadelphia wrote that the book had "clear explanations and engaging style" and that "If it were not for the erudition and craftsmanship of its author, this work might have choked on its own richness."

Gabaccia argued that "Juliani seems to have experienced greater difficulties in interpreting Philadelphia's early Italian residents within the context of their own times, especially before the Napoleonic Wars." She suggested using a "global and comparative approach" instead.

Luconi wrote "Juliani has produced a work of remarkable scholarship." He argued that since Liguria was the place of origin of most of Philadelphia's early Italians, a reader may want to have more information about the subjects' pre-immigration backgrounds.

Sam Migliore of the University College of Cape Breton wrote that Juliani "makes an important contribution to this general body of literature".

Stephen J. Sullivan, an employee of Lawrence High School in Cedarhurst, New York, wrote in the Journal of Urban History that he was "quite impressed" by how the book's author "painstakingly examines and describes the complex matrix of social and political institutions already established by Italian pioneers before the great post-1870 migrations began".

Topp had an overall positive reaction to the book. He argued that the "painstaking examinations of census records" may not have been concise enough and may not be of interest to readers, and Topp believed "Juliani's assumption that his subjects regarded assimilation as a singular and uncomplex goal [was] unsettling."

Richard A. Varbero of State University of New York, New Paltz stated that the book was "a fine contribution to the studies of Philadelphia" and is "a probing and valuable account of Philadelphia as it evolved into a major integer of the rapidly industrializing nation." Varbero added that due to the less concentrated and smaller nature of the early Italian community, "the portraits he paints lack the intensity, volatility, and human drama discovered in the wards, the schools, and the churches of the post-1880 period."

Diane Vecchio of Furman University wrote that the author "successfully demonstrates that by 1870 the Italian population in Philadelphia had created an ethnic community that was clearly in place as the origins of Italian immigrants shifted from Italy's northern and central areas to regions of the South and Sicily"; she argued that the book had a good explanation of how the emigration interacted with the cities politics and its "examination of early immigrant communal development within the political, commercial, and intellectual context of the city"; Vecchio argued that the author should have elaborated more on the role of women in the community.

Robert M. Zecker, a PhD candidate in American civilization at the University of Pennsylvania, wrote that the book is a "fascinating study of the early “protocommunity”" that has a "wealth of insights".

Zucchi stated that the book was well written and that it "crowns years of research on the part of a sociologist who seems very much at home in the discipline of history. He added that due to the large amount of detail, it was "not an easy read." He suggested that the book could rely on its tables instead of including the data within the text.

== See also ==
- Staying Italian
- History of the Italian Americans in Philadelphia
