= Cheesesteak =

Sandwich

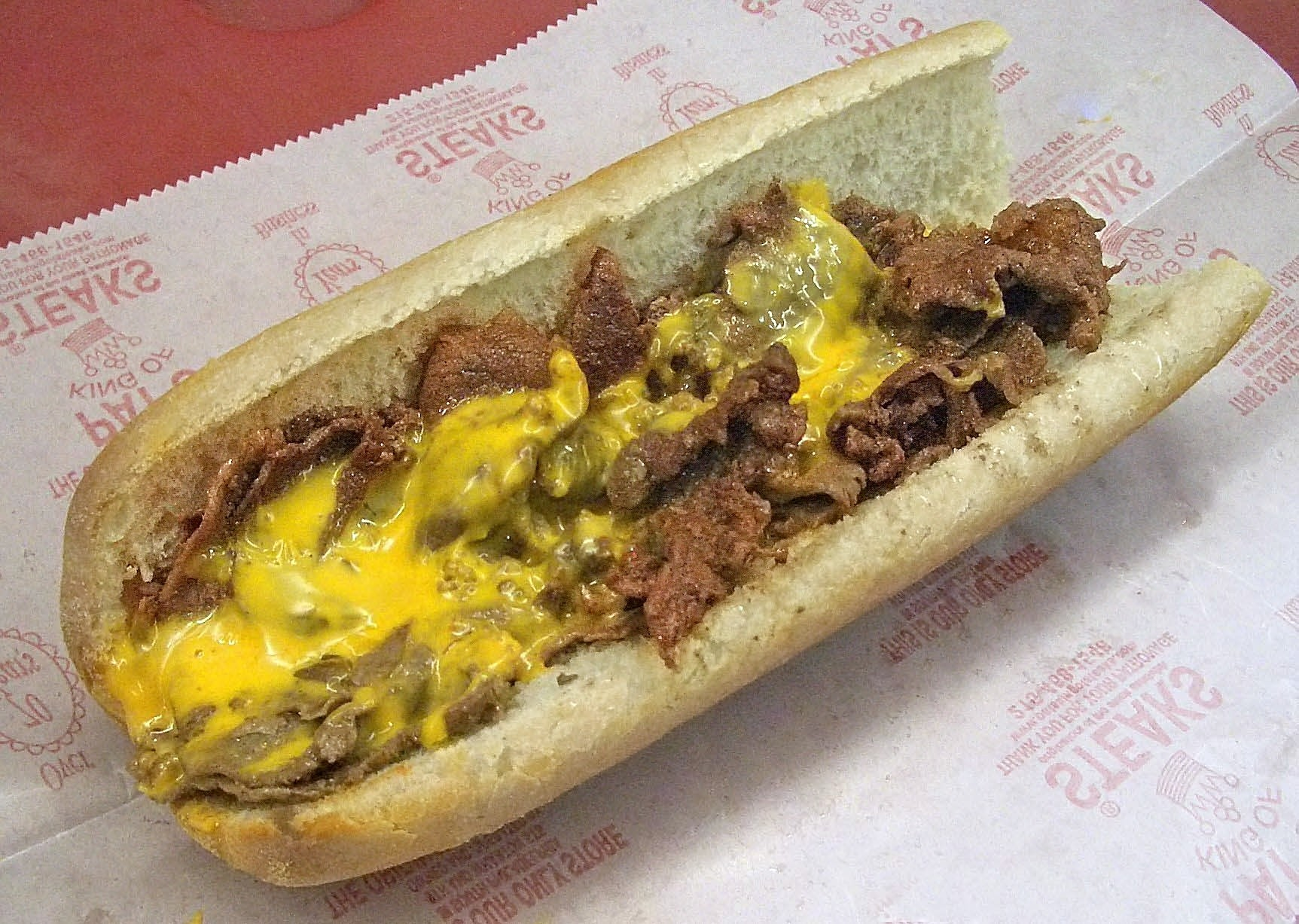
- A cheesesteak sandwich with Cheez Whiz
- Alternative names: Philadelphia cheesesteak, Philly cheesesteak
- Course: Main course
- Place of origin: United States
- Region or state: Philadelphia, Pennsylvania
- Created by: Pat and Harry Olivieri
- Serving temperature: Hot
- Main ingredients: Sliced steak, cheese, bread
- Variations: Multiple

A cheesesteak (Note: also known as a Philadelphia cheesesteak, Philly cheesesteak, cheesesteak sandwich, cheese steak, or steak and cheese) is a sandwich made from thinly sliced pieces of beefsteak (often rib eye) and melted cheese in a long hoagie roll. A popular regional fast food, it has its roots in the American city of Philadelphia, Pennsylvania.

== History ==
The cheesesteak was developed in the early 20th century "by combining frizzled beef, onions, and cheese in a small loaf of bread," according to a 1987 exhibition catalog published by the Library Company of Philadelphia and the Historical Society of Pennsylvania.

Philadelphians Pat and Harry Olivieri are often credited with inventing the sandwich by serving chopped steak on an Italian roll in the early 1930s. The exact story behind its creation is debated, but according to many accounts, Pat and Harry Olivieri originally owned a hot dog stand, and on one occasion, decided to make a new sandwich using chopped beef and grilled onions. While Pat was eating the sandwich, a cab driver stopped by and was interested in it, so he requested one for himself. After eating it, the cab driver suggested that Olivieri quit making hot dogs and instead focus on the new sandwich. They began selling this variation of steak sandwiches at their hot dog stand near South Philadelphia's Italian Market. They became so popular that Pat opened up his own restaurant which still operates today as Pat's King of Steaks.

The sandwich was originally prepared without cheese. According to Pat's son Herb Olivieri, American cheese was first added by "Cocky Joe" Lorenza, a manager at the Ridge Avenue location in March of 1951. (However, other Olivieri members may say it was provolone.) There is some dispute over whether Pat's was the first to add cheese, though to date no concrete evidence has emerged to disprove Olivieri's story.

Cheesesteaks have become popular at restaurants and food carts throughout the city with many locations being independently owned, family-run businesses. Variations of cheesesteaks are now common in several fast food chains. Versions of the sandwich can also be found at high-end restaurants. Many establishments outside of Philadelphia refer to the sandwich as a "Philly cheesesteak".

== Description ==
=== Meat ===
The meat traditionally used is thinly sliced rib-eye or top round, although other cuts of beef are also used. On a lightly oiled griddle at medium temperature, the steak slices are quickly browned and then scrambled into smaller pieces with a flat spatula. Slices of cheese are then placed over the meat, letting it melt, and then the roll is placed on top of the cheese. The mixture is then scooped up with a spatula and pressed into the roll, which is then cut in half.

Common additions include sautéed onions, mushrooms, bell peppers, salt, and black pepper.

=== Bread ===
In Philadelphia, cheesesteaks are invariably served on hoagie rolls. Among several brands, perhaps the most famous are Amoroso rolls; these rolls are long, soft, and slightly salted. One source writes that "a proper cheesesteak consists of provolone or Cheez Whiz slathered on an Amoroso roll and stuffed with thinly shaved grilled meat," while a reader's letter to an Indianapolis magazine, lamenting the unavailability of good cheesesteaks, wrote that "the mention of the Amoroso roll brought tears to my eyes." After commenting on the debates over types of cheese and "chopped steak or sliced", Risk and Insurance magazine declared, "The only thing nearly everybody can agree on is that it all has to be piled onto a fresh, locally baked Amoroso roll."

In 2019, Angelo's Pizzeria in South Philadelphia introduced a homemade roll with a firm crust and sesame seeds, a style that has been widely popular among modern cheesesteak restaurants. Philadelphia magazine has hailed it part of the "new era" of the reimagined "cheesesteak 2.0".

Food distributors often suggest or sell sandwiches which are inspired by the classic cheesesteak. For example, Pillsbury provides a recipe for "Philly Cheesesteak Wraps" which substitutes a tortilla for the bread. Nestlé offers a "Philly Steak and Cheese" made in the form of a Hot Pocket.

=== Cheese ===
American cheese, provolone, and Cheez Whiz are the most commonly used cheeses or cheese products put on to the Philly cheesesteak.

The Philadelphia Inquirer's restaurant critic Craig LaBan said, "Provolone is for aficionados, extra-sharp for the most discriminating among them." Geno's owner Joey Vento said, "We always recommend the provolone. That's the real cheese."

Cheez Whiz, first marketed in 1952, was not yet available for the original 1932 version (or the 1951 version that first added cheese), but has expanded in popularity. A 1986 New York Times article called Cheez Whiz "the sine qua non of cheesesteak connoisseurs." In a 1985 interview, Pat Olivieri's nephew Frank Olivieri said that he uses "the processed cheese spread familiar to millions of parents who prize speed and ease in fixing the children's lunch for the same reason, because it is fast."

Cheez Whiz was first added at Pat's South Philadelphia location by Frank Olivieri Sr. in the late 1950s. By that time cheesesteaks were already popular at the Ridge Avenue/Strawberry Mansion location, but Pat and Harry Olivieri were hesitant to serve them in South Philly because many neighborhood customers kept kosher and mixing cheese and meat on a grill is not kosher. Frank Sr. got the idea to surreptitiously add the Whiz after the sandwich was made, and the idea eventually took off.

Cheez Whiz is "overwhelmingly the favorite" at Pat's, outselling runner-up American by a ratio of eight or ten to one, while Geno's claims to go through eight to ten cases of Cheez Whiz a day.

Cooper Sharp, a pasteurized process American cheese, has been gaining ground as a new cheese option since 2019 when Angelo's Pizzeria opened its South Philadelphia location and served cheesesteaks with it. Made from aged cheddar and having a higher milkfat content, the product is sharper and creamier than ordinary American cheese. According to Kosuke Chujo, who runs a cheesesteak shop in Tokyo, the cheese "was very creamy and delicious with the perfect balance of salt".

== Variations ==
- A Buffalo chicken cheesesteak is a chicken cheesesteak with Buffalo sauce, and may contain blue cheese.
- A cheesesteak hoagie contains lettuce and tomato in addition to the ingredients found in the traditional steak sandwich, and may contain other elements often served in a hoagie.
- A chicken cheesesteak is made with chicken instead of beef.
- The Heater is served at Phillies baseball games at Citizens Bank Park and is the team's official cheesesteak. Produced by Campo's, it is hot as it is topped with jalapeños, hot sauce, and jalapeño cheddar.
- In Lahore, a variation uses masalas and Indo-Pak spices.
- A mushroom cheesesteak is a cheesesteak with mushrooms.
- A pepper cheesesteak is a cheesesteak with green bell peppers, hot cherry peppers, long hot peppers, or sweet peppers.
- A pizza steak is a cheesesteak topped with pizza sauce and mozzarella cheese and may be toasted in a broiler.
- A steak milano is a cheesesteak containing grilled or fried tomatoes and oregano.
- A vegan cheesesteak is a sandwich that replaces steak and cheese with vegan ingredients, such as seitan or mushrooms for the steak, and soy-based cheese.

== See also ==
- Barros Luco
- Italian beef
- List of American sandwiches
- List of regional dishes of the United States
- List of sandwiches
- List of steak dishes
- Roast beef sandwich
- Steak sandwich
