= Geno's Steaks =

Coordinates: 39.933702°N 75.158898°W

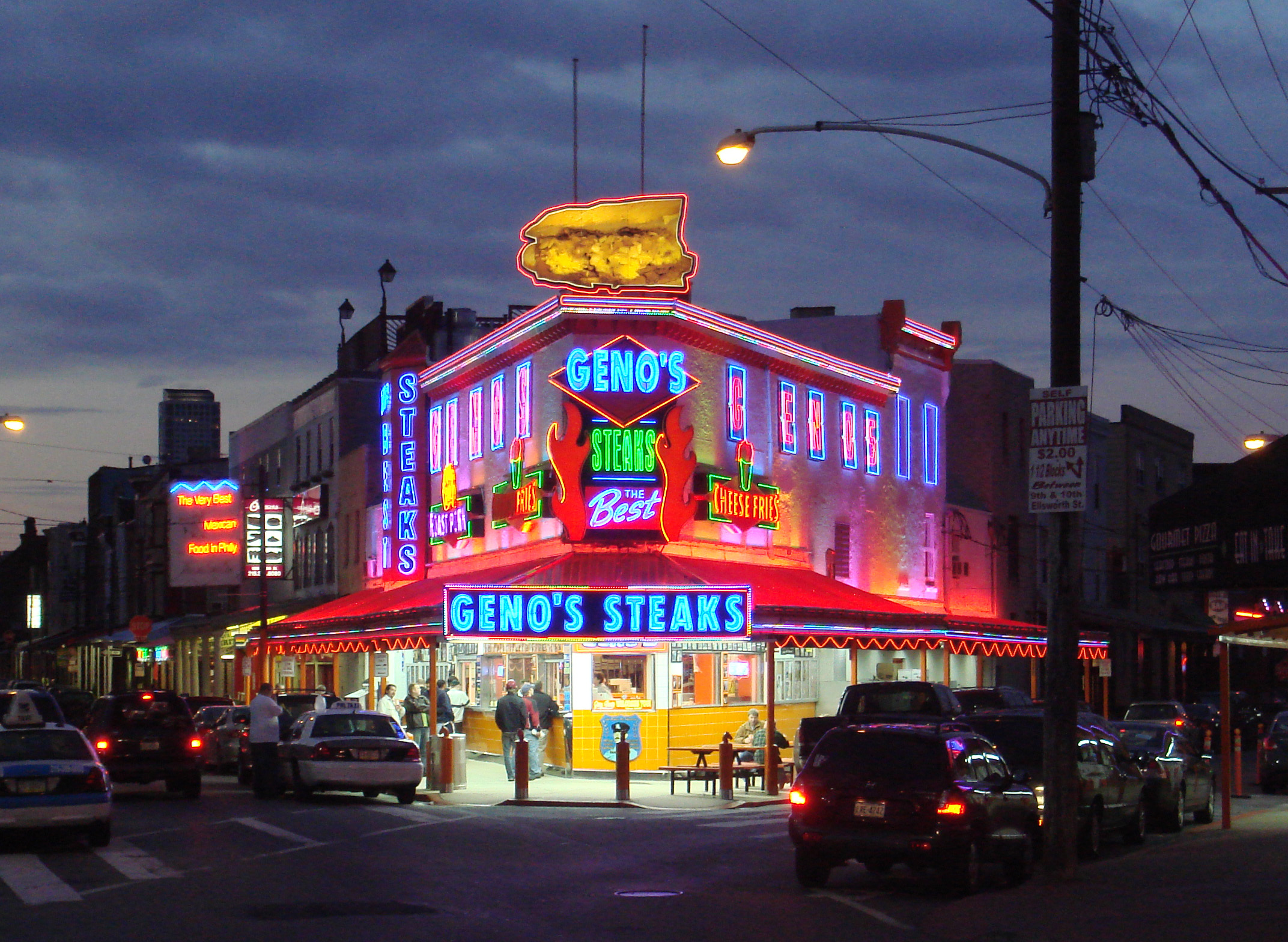
- Geno's Steaks seen at night in 2007
- Interactive map of Geno's Steaks

Restaurant information
- Established: 1966; 60 years ago
- Owner: Geno Vento
- Previous owner: Joey Vento (1966–2011)
- Food type: North American cuisine
- Location: 1219 South 9th St, Philadelphia, Pennsylvania, 19147, United States
- Website: www.genosteaks.com

Geno's Steaks is a Philadelphia restaurant specializing in cheesesteaks, founded in 1966 by Joey Vento. Geno's is located in South Philadelphia at the intersection of 9th Street and Passyunk Avenue, across the street from rival Pat's King of Steaks, which is generally credited with having invented the staple of Philadelphia cuisine in 1933.

Known for its dozens of neon lights and signs, Geno's operates 24 hours a day, seven days a week. The restaurant has been featured in television shows, including The Tonight Show and Food Network and Travel Channel programs.

Like its rival Pat's, Geno's is known for its specific ordering procedure: customers are expected to order quickly and with precise terminology, specifying the type of cheese (including "wit" or "witout" onions) and following a particular sequence. The restaurants have similar menus, but Geno's does not chop the meat while Pat's does, and Vento preferred provolone cheese. Geno's serves an estimated 30,000 sandwiches per month, and claims to have sold up to 4,500 sandwiches in a day.

== History ==
=== 20th century ===
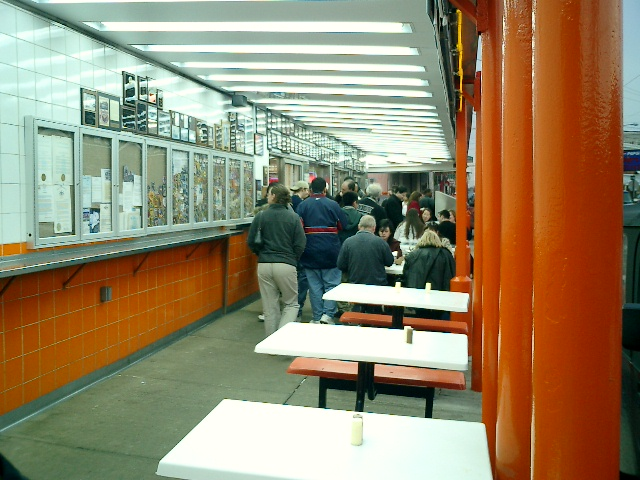
One of two outdoor eating areas at Geno's in March 2006

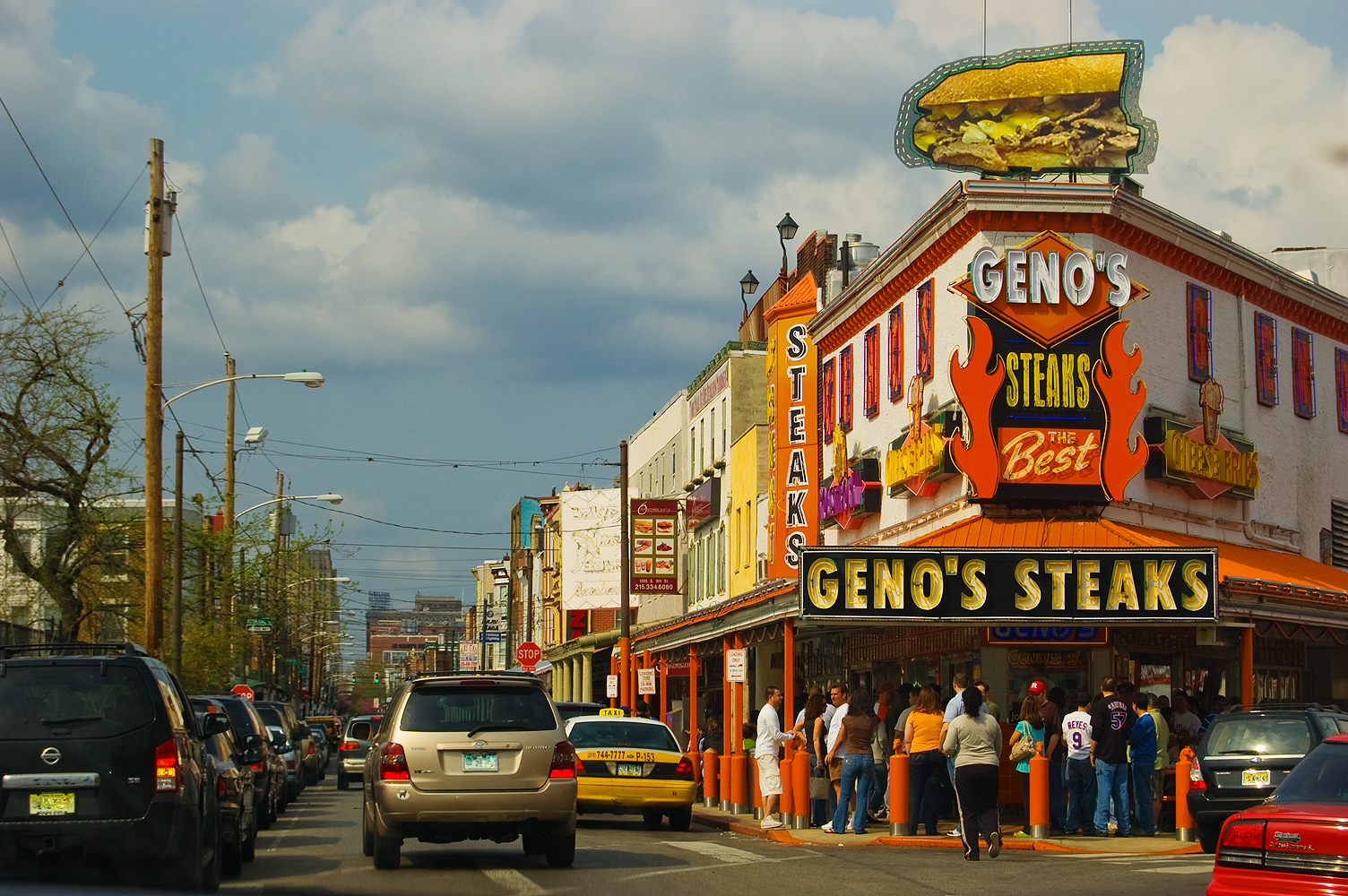
Geno's in April 2008

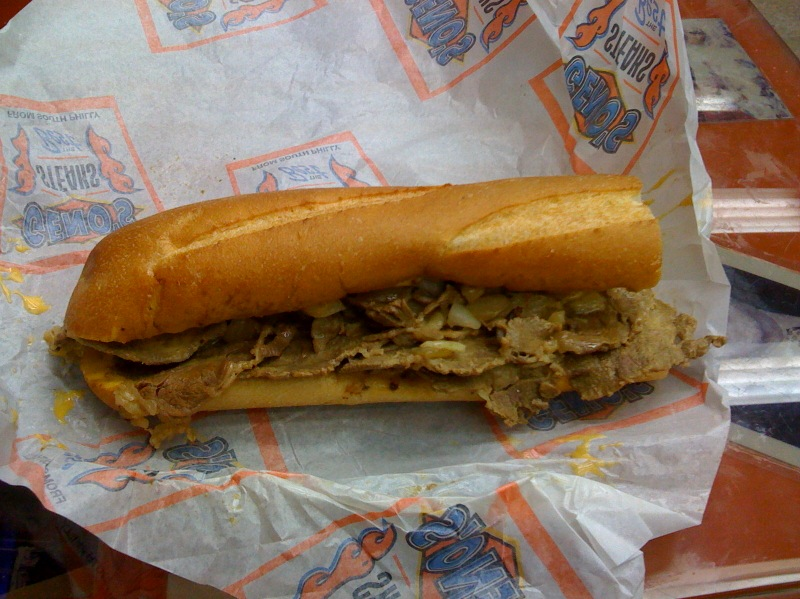
A "whiz wit" cheesesteak from Geno's in April 2009

Joey Vento was born in Philadelphia on December 18, 1939, to Eva and James Vento. He was a third-generation Italian American whose grandfather had operated a sandwich shop in the city's Italian Market in the 1920s. Vento dropped out of school in the 9th grade to help his father run a restaurant. He worked various jobs, including dishwasher and meat truck driver. In 1966, when he was 23, Vento used $2,000 in savings to open his own grill restaurant at 9th and Passyunk. This launched a rivalry with the decades-old Pat's King of Steaks.

Vento said he chose the name Geno's because "Joe's Steak Place" was already in business. He improvised the name from a broken door on which someone had painted 'GINO' and modified the spelling to prevent confusion with a regional fast food chain called Gino's.

In 1971, Vento named his newborn son Geno.

Geno's was featured in the background of the music video of the 1991 single Motownphilly by the music group Boyz II Men.

=== 21st century ===
Geno's was awarded Best of Philly for Best Takeout by Philadelphia Magazine in 2000. In April 2004, a branch of the shop opened in Citizens Bank Park, the home of the Philadelphia Phillies. This location was closed in 2006 and replaced with Rick's Steaks (operated by Rick Olivieri, grandson of Pat Olivieri, founder of Pat's King of Steaks).

On August 23, 2011, Vento died of a heart attack at his home in Shamong Township, New Jersey, at the age of 71. Ownership of Geno's Steaks passed to his son Geno, named for the restaurant.

In 2016, Geno Vento renovated the restaurant for the first time in half a century, adding outdoor seating, improving the order windows, and redesigning the interior.

Geno's Steaks has branch locations at Terminal B of Philadelphia International Airport, Live! Casino & Hotel Philadelphia, and, since September 20, 2015, at Stateside Live!.

In 2025, the restaurant was briefly renamed "Steakquon's" to commemorate the release of Madden NFL 26, which featured Philadelphia Eagles running back Saquon Barkley on its cover.

==== "Speak English" controversy ====
The 2006 sign on Geno's front window that provoked controversy

For about a decade, a sign in one of the restaurant's windows read, "This Is AMERICA: WHEN ORDERING Please "SPEAK ENGLISH"." Owner Vento installed the sign in 2006 and said it was directed at the Mexican immigrants in the neighborhood. Critics accused Vento of racism and xenophobia. The controversy received national media coverage, in part because of the ongoing nationwide debate over immigration policy.

In an interview with Fox News analyst Neil Cavuto, Vento said that he does not turn away any customer, and therefore does not discriminate. He also vowed to keep his sign no matter how much pressure he receives. He told Cavuto that his parents had to learn English when they came to the U.S. He said that if his customers order in any other language, he will give them Cheez Whiz on bread. Vento posed some rhetorical questions: "If one goes into a Puerto Rican neighborhood, how many signs would be seen in English?" and "When one is on the telephone, it may say press 1 for English, press 2 for Spanish; but where is the number for, say, Italian or Korean?"

The following year, The Philadelphia Commission on Human Relations filed a discrimination complaint, arguing that Geno's violated the city's Fair Practices Ordinance, which prohibits discrimination in public accommodation, by "denying service to someone because of his or her national origin, and having printed material making certain groups of people feel their patronage is unwelcome."

Vento said that no one has been refused service for not speaking English, but said, "If I can't understand you, you might not get the sandwich you thought you ordered."

The Philadelphia Commission on Human Relations found probable cause that the sign is discriminatory. The commission says the sign could make non-English speakers feel unwelcome or discriminated against.

Vento enlisted the aid of the Southeastern Legal Foundation, a public-interest legal organization. In 2006, the Foundation had defended a bar owner cited by the Ohio Civil Rights Commission for a sign reading "For Service, Speak English." That case was settled when the owner removed the sign.

On March 19, 2008, Philadelphia's Commission on Human Relations ruled that the restaurant did not violate the city's Fair Practices Ordinance.

After Vento died in 2011, and the restaurant was taken over by his son Geno, the sign stayed up for about five more years. It was quietly removed at some point before the 2016 Democratic National Convention, reportedly to avoid offense.

== See also ==
- Italian Market (Philadelphia)
- History of the Italian Americans in Philadelphia
