= Staying Italian =

2009 book by Jordan Stanger-Ross

Staying Italian: Urban Change and Ethnic Life in Postwar Toronto and Philadelphia
- Author: Jordan Stanger-Ross
- Publisher: University of Chicago Press
- Publication date: 2009

Staying Italian: Urban Change and Ethnic Life in Postwar Toronto and Philadelphia is a 2009 book by Jordan Stanger-Ross published by the University of Chicago Press. The book compares and contrasts Italian Americans in South Philadelphia to Italian Canadians in Little Italy, Toronto, covering the post-World War II period, and how the two communities define what it means to have an "Italian" identity. The book compares and contrasts the communities' employment patterns, religious practices, marriage practices, and choices of housing in the respective real estate markets. Toronto's Italian community became geographically dispersed while Philadelphia's Italian community remained geographically concentrated; Stanger-Ross explained that the territoriality was more important to Philadelphia's Italians compared to Toronto's, and that the lack of new Italian immigration to Philadelphia contributed to this difference. In Philadelphia African-Americans were settling the city, and Italian Philadelphians feared that their neighborhood would be invaded by black people. Philadelphia's Italians were less likely to move out of South Philadelphia, compared to Toronto's Italians in regards to their Little Italy. In Toronto Italian immigration had continued, and therefore many of the Italians were recent immigrants. Many of them moved to outlying areas of the city and the suburbs.

== Background ==
Sources used by the book include census data, church registers, ethnic presses, government studies, marriage records, oral histories, publications of Catholic parishes, and real estate records; the real estate records included mortgage records. The book also used secondary literature as sourcing.

== Contents ==
The book is organized as a comparative study of Italian immigrant settlement and ethnicity in Toronto and Philadelphia. According to reviewer Michelson, the opening chapter examines the different historical development of the two cities as a whole, establishing the broader urban, political, and social context for the case studies that follow. The remaining chapters focus more closely on South Philadelphia and Toronto's Little Italy, tracing how local institutions, neighborhood geography, and civic life shaped the experiences of Italian migrants and their descendants.

Several chapters explore the relationship between urban space and ethnic identity, including the ways Italian communities used streets, housing patterns, businesses, and public institutions to define neighborhood belonging. The book also analyzes how local conditions in each city affected the formation of community boundaries and the meaning of Italian ethnicity over time. Reviewers noted that this city-to-city comparison is central to the book's argument and distinguishes it from more traditional single-community studies.

One chapter is devoted in particular to religion and the role of religious practice in community formation. Caroline Waldron Merithew of the University of Dayton wrote that in this chapter "the comparative North American framework's purpose and possibility shine" and described it as the book's "most vital contribution to the understanding of Italian ethnicity". The volume also includes visual materials such as graphs, maps, and photographs, which Merithew identified as part of its presentation and analytical value.

Stanger-Ross deliberately avoided framing the study primarily through the concept of assimilation. This choice drew mixed responses from reviewers. Maria C. Lizzi of the University of Albany argued that the book would have benefited from greater engagement with assimilation as an interpretive framework, while John J. Bukowczyk of Wayne State University regarded the omission as "an understandable limitation".

== Reception ==
Lizzi stated that the book was "a step forward for ethnic historians of the post-war period", but that it is "impeded" by several issues, with the most significant being the omission of race relations such as Italian-American and African-American relations in Philadelphia. Lizzi argued that the lack of discussion of issues regarding assimilation and, to a lesser extent, class status were problematic.

Bukowczyk stated that scholars from the United States "will find this book an interesting and worthwhile read." He stated that the relations of blacks and whites in Philadelphia is a "relatively ignored elephant in the room" even though Stanger-Ross stated that such dynamics were present in Philadelphia but not in Toronto.

William Michelson of the University of Toronto stated that the book is "a rich examination of the persistence of and variations in Italian culture in North American cities-and a fascinating read." He suggested that the book could have added more macro knowledge.

Carmela Patrias of Brock University stated that this book was "fruitful" research.

Merithew stated that the book "adds crucial geographic and chronological breadth to scholarship on Italian immigration." She argued that the book should have better explained its photographs and explained how racism impacted demography of the Italians in Philadelphia as urban decay occurred.

Roberto Perin of York University wrote that "this book fills an important void in the field of North American immigration and ethnicity where publications on the post-war period are few and far between."

== See also ==
- Building Little Italy
- History of the Italian Americans in Philadelphia
- Italian Canadians in the Greater Toronto Area
