= Passyunk Square, Philadelphia =

Neighborhood of Philadelphia, Pennsylvania, US

Passyunk Square
- Neighborhood of Philadelphia
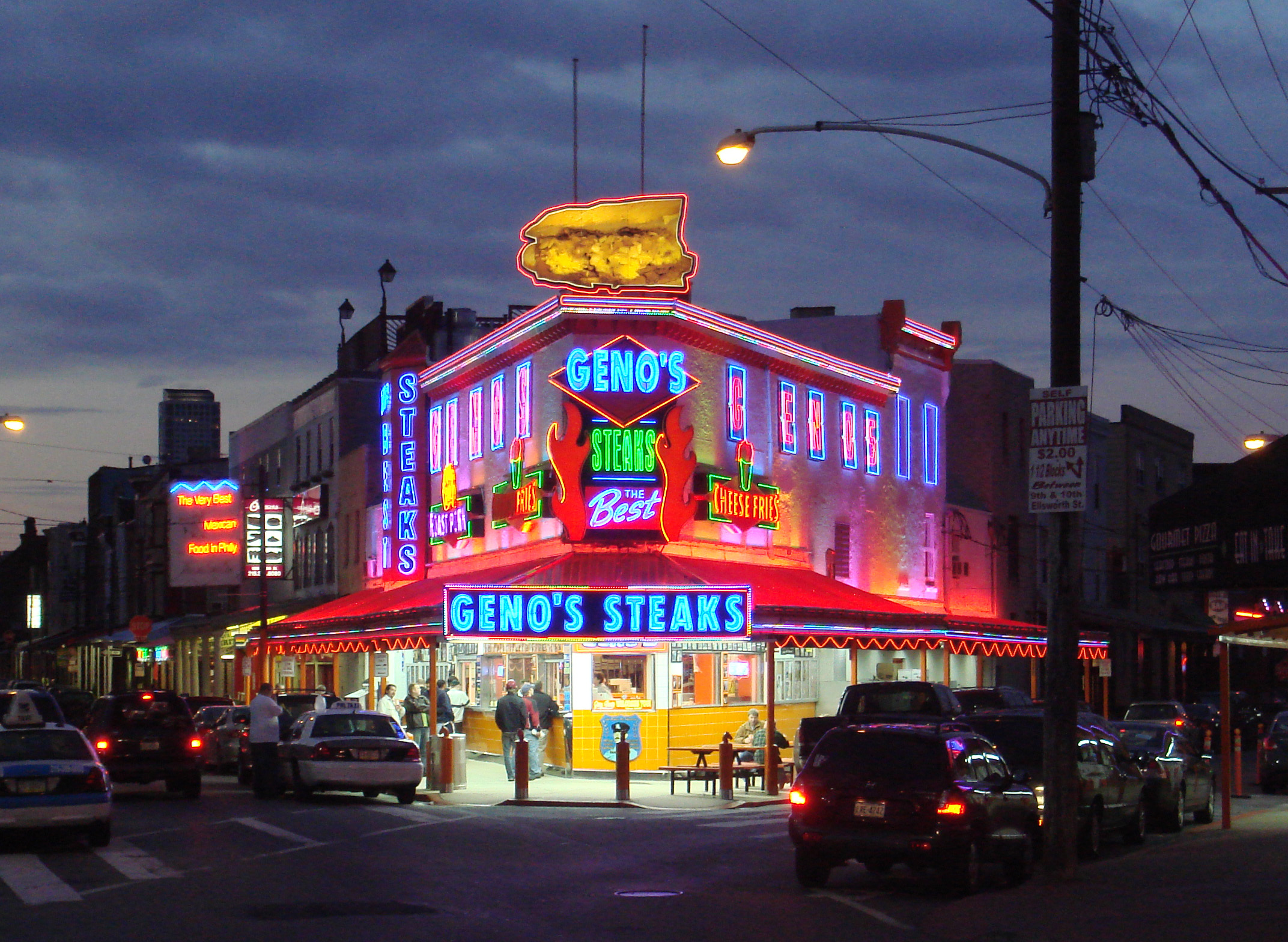
- Geno's Steaks at 9th Street and Passyunk in South Philadelphia

- Location within Philadelphia
- Country: United States
- State: Pennsylvania
- County: Philadelphia County
- City: Philadelphia
- ZIP codes: 19147, 19148
- Area codes: 215, 267, 445

Passyunk Square is a neighborhood in South Philadelphia bounded by Broad Street to the west, 6th Street to the east, Tasker Street to the south and Washington Avenue to the north. Passyunk Square is bordered by the Bella Vista, Hawthorne, Central South Philadelphia, Wharton, and Point Breeze neighborhoods. The neighborhood's etymology originates from the Lenape word "pachsegink", meaning “in the valley”. The name came from the 1800s Passyunk Township, Pennsylvania which named Passyunk Square Park, located between 12th, 13th, Reed and Wharton Streets. The park was eventually renamed Columbus Square Park, and subsequently the neighborhood became known as Columbus Square. Sue Montella, Geoff DiMasi, and a group of neighbors revived the Passyunk Square name when forming the Passyunk Square Civic Association in 2003. The name "Passyunk Square" was researched and proposed by Geoff DiMasi after considering other historical names like Wharton that had been used in the neighborhood over the years. The area has come to be known as Little Saigon for its large Vietnamese American commercial and residential presence, with one of the largest Vietnamese populations on the east coast.

== History ==
Lafayette Cemetery was established in 1828 on the block between Federal and Wharton Streets and 9th and 10th Avenues. The cemetery was originally designed to hold 14,000 bodies, but by 1946, it was in disrepair and overcrowded with 47,000 bodies. In March 1946, the city condemned Lafayette Cemetery and relocated all of the remains to Evergreen Memorial Park in Bensalem Township.

The former location of Lafayette Cemetery is used by the city of Philadelphia as the Capitolo Playground.

== Education ==
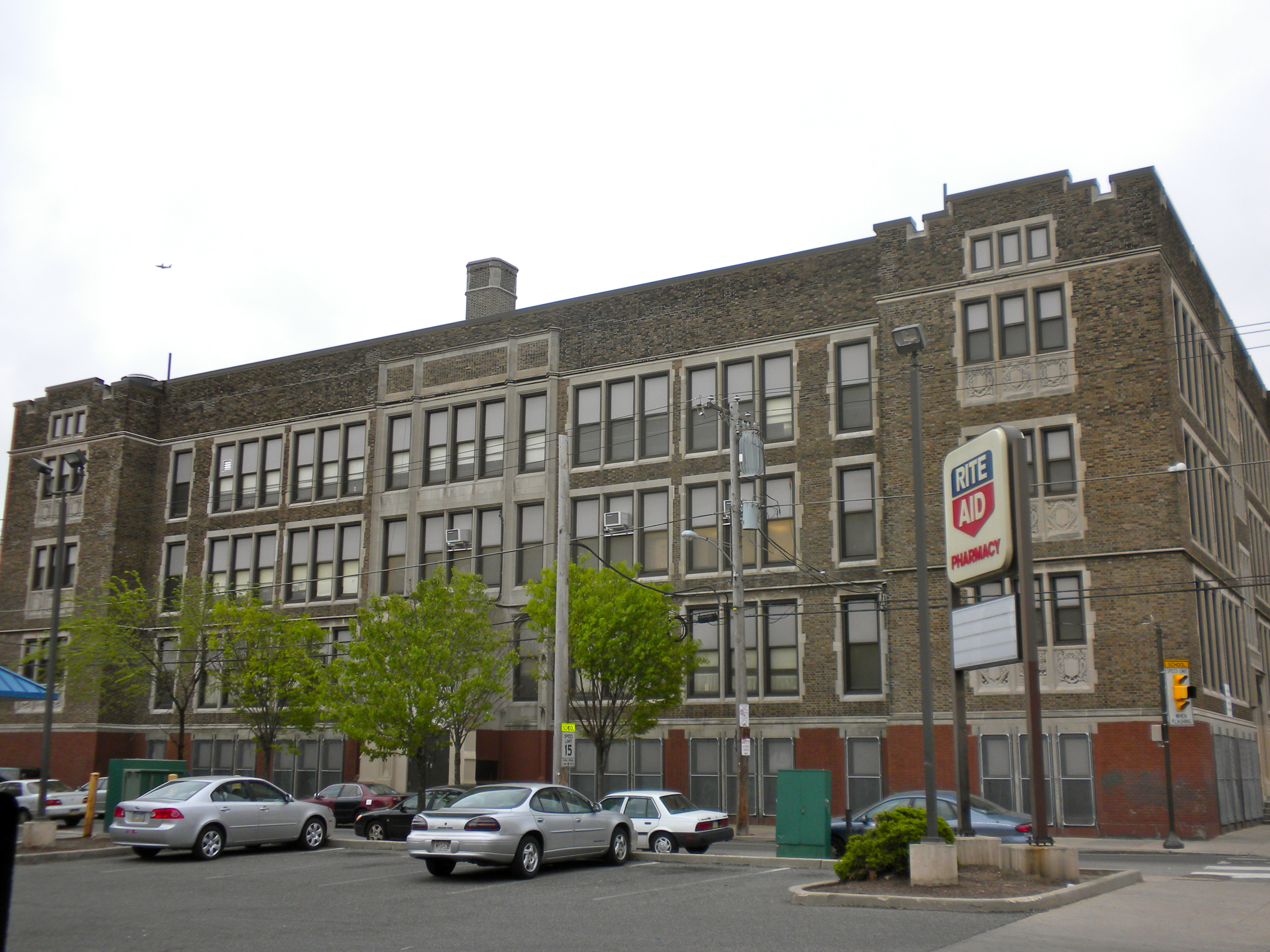
Eliza Butler Kirkbride School in Passyunk Square

The School District of Philadelphia serves the neighborhood.

Two K-8 schools, Fanny Jackson Coppin School (formerly the Federal Street School and Andrew Jackson School) and Eliza Butler Kirkbride School, are listed on the National Register of Historic Places. These schools serve portions of the neighborhood. Furness High School serves areas within both the Kirkbride and Jackson zones.

== Demographics ==
- White - 63%; Black - 4%; Asian - 17%; Hispanic - 8%; Mixed - 7%; Other - 1%

== Shopping district ==
The neighborhood is best known for its shopping and restaurants along the East Passyunk Avenue corridor.

East Passyunk Avenue features a large number of privately owned shops, restaurants, and grocery stores; additionally, it has a number of businesses such as insurance offices, salons, and pharmacies.

The northernmost portion of one of America's oldest curb markets, popularly called The Italian Market, also falls within the Association's boundaries.

== Transportation ==
Passyunk Square is served by SEPTA's Broad Street Line at Tasker-Morris and Ellsworth-Federal stations. Several SEPTA bus lines run through the neighborhood.

== See also ==
- Geno's Steaks
- Pat's King of Steaks
- South Fellini
- Passyunk Township, Pennsylvania
- South Philadelphia
- Tofani door
