= Palumbo's =

20th-century restaurant with nightclub in Philadelphia, US

Coordinates: 39°56′22″N 75°09′29″W

Palumbo’s
- Company type: Restaurant
- Industry: Entertainment
- Founded: 1940, Philadelphia, Pennsylvania, U.S.
- Headquarters: Philadelphia, Pennsylvania, USA
- Key people: Frank Palumbo
- Products: Food and beverage

Palumbo's was a popular 20th-century restaurant with nightclub entertainment located near the Italian Market section of South Philadelphia. Palumbo's included a banquet hall and Nostalgia's Restaurant. The basic format of the restaurant was an adaptation of the music hall of the United Kingdom or vaudeville in the United States, showcasing live entertainment in a restaurant and saloon setting. It was owned by local businessman and philanthropist Frank Palumbo. Amid unsubstantiated rumors of Mafia connections, Palumbo expanded a boardinghouse started by his grandfather, Antonio Palumbo into the entertainment complex. Palumbo's was destroyed by fire in 1994. The cause of the fire was determined to be arson. The site, marked by an unofficial historical plaque, is now occupied by a Rite Aid drug store.

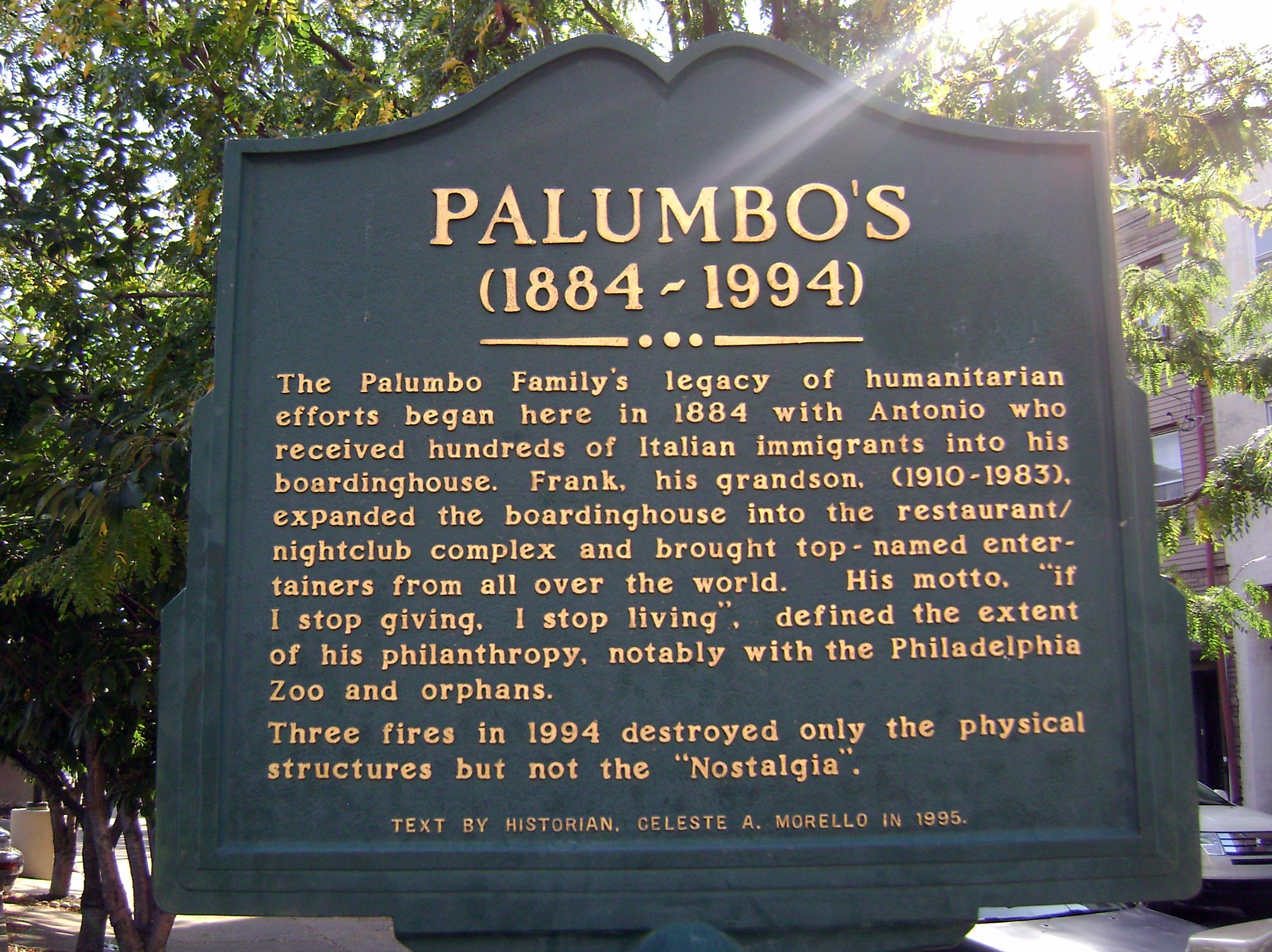
Plaque at the former location of Palumbo's

== Entertainment ==
In the 1940s and 1950s, Philadelphia was an important pop music center, with many bands and singers being made or broken in the city. The 20th Century Club, Ciro's and the opulent, art deco Click Club on Market St. which Frank also owned were significant elements in the music scene. Benny Goodman And His Orchestra with Patti Page and pianist Teddy Wilson performed a Live 1946 radio broadcast for the 'One Night Stand' show at Frank Palumbo's Click Club in Philadelphia. Frequent performers at Palumbo's included Frank Sinatra, Sergio Franchi, Louis Prima, Louis Armstrong, the Clooney Sisters, Jimmy Durante and "The Godfathers" [Al Martino], comedians and numerous entertainers. A nightly radio series broadcast concerts from the club, many of which were later released as albums.

Well beyond the club's heyday, the restaurant remained popular. Sinatra visited the “black tie saloon” frequently and Mayor Frank Rizzo spent most evenings there during his rise to power, years in office and beyond. The banquet hall became a popular cultural tradition for many social groups, business organizations, family celebrations, and special events that were mostly attracted by the reasonable prices, menu items and entertainment.
