= Pat's King of Steaks =

Restaurant in Philadelphia

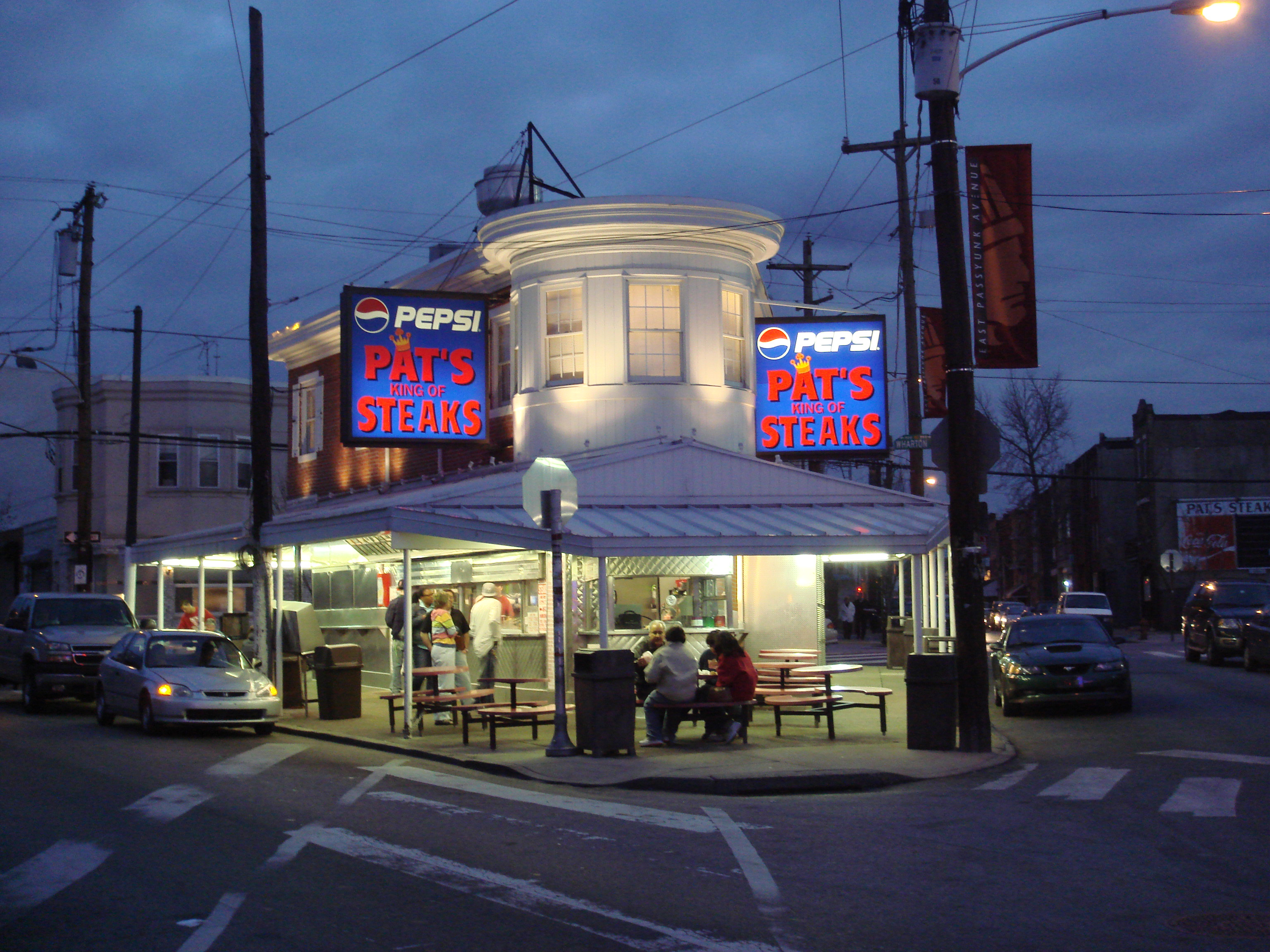
- Pat's Steaks at dusk.
- Interactive map of Pat's King of Steaks

Restaurant information
- Established: 1930; 96 years ago
- Owners: Frank Olivieri, Jr.
- Previous owners: Pat Olivieri; Harry Olivieri
- Food type: North American cuisine
- Location: 1237 East Passyunk Avenue, Philadelphia, Pennsylvania, United States
- Coordinates: 39°55′59″N 75°09′33″W
- Website: PatsKingOfSteaks.com

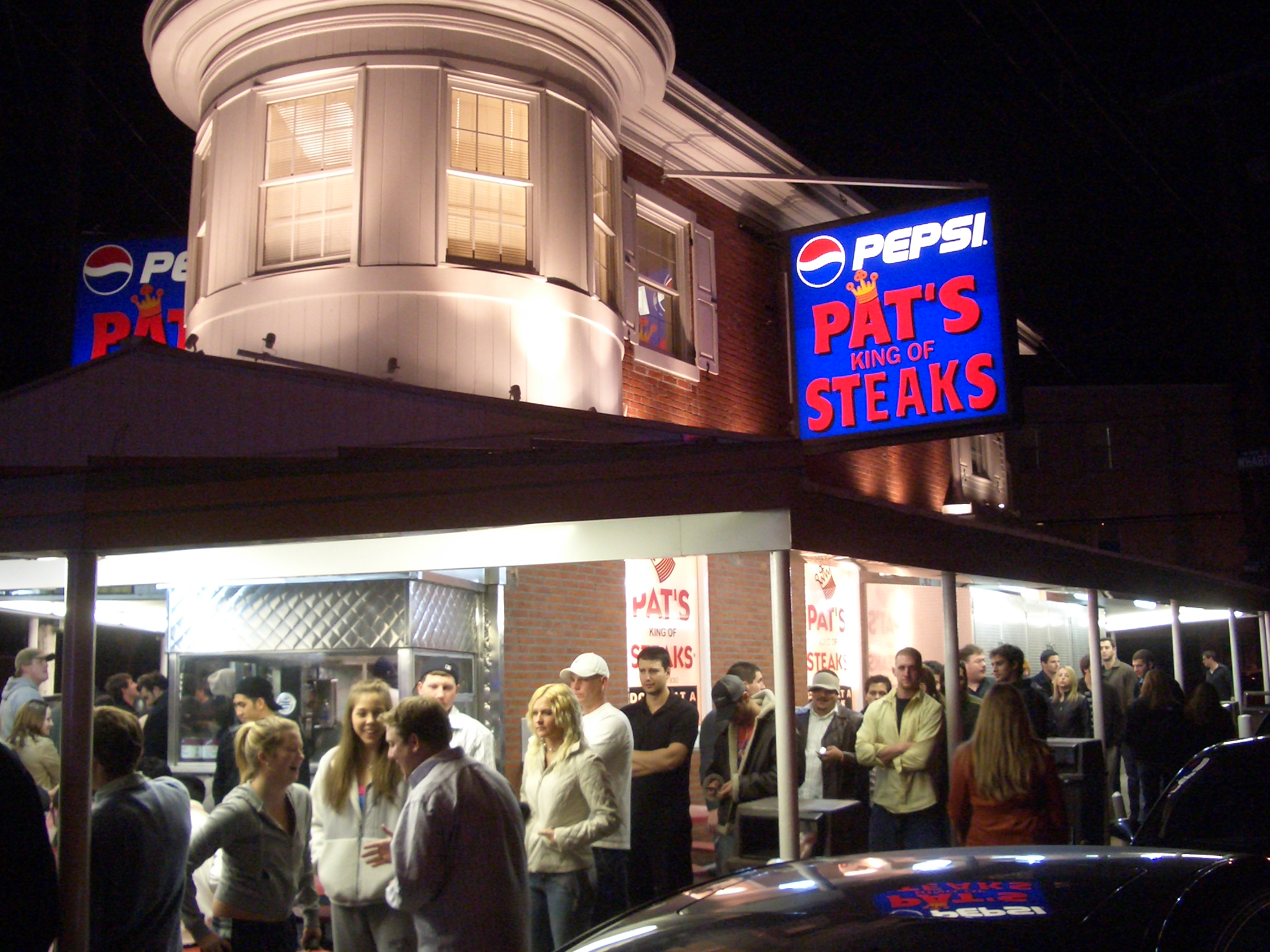
Late night diners crowded in front of Pat's Steaks, 2005

Pat's King of Steaks (also known as Pat's Steaks) is a restaurant that specializes in cheesesteaks. It is located at the intersection of South 9th Street, Wharton Street and East Passyunk Avenue in the Passyunk Square section of South Philadelphia, directly across the street from rival Geno's Steaks.

It was founded in 1930 by Italian American brothers Pat and Harry Olivieri, who are credited with the invention of the cheesesteak.

== History ==
Pat's King of Steaks was founded by Pat (1907–1974) and Harry Olivieri (May 25, 1916 – July 22, 2006) in 1930 when they opened a hot dog stall at the corners of 9th Street, Wharton Street, and Passyunk Avenue. The brothers ran the stall while holding down other jobs; Harry worked as a carpenter, while Pat made sleds.

In 1933, as the family relates the story, the brothers were working their stand when they decided to try something different for lunch. Pat Olivieri sent Harry Olivieri to the market for some inexpensive steak. The brothers thinly sliced the steak, then grilled it along with some chopped onions. The aroma attracted a cabdriver who was a regular customer; he asked to try the dish which the brothers called a steak sandwich, though the term originated from Louis' Lunch in New Haven, Connecticut, describing a similar sandwich. Pat sold him the sandwich for ten cents (equivalent to $2.49 in 2025). The steak sandwich would later evolve into the modern cheesesteak.

Soon afterwards, at the advice of the cabdriver, the brothers started selling steak sandwiches instead of hot dogs. By 1940, they had saved enough money to rent space to open a restaurant at the same spot where they had their stand. The two brothers worked at the restaurant for 15 to 18 hours a day for the next few decades while the restaurant was open 24 hours a day. Harry worked at the Philadelphia Navy Yard during World War II before returning to the restaurant.

In 1972, Harry Olivieri had a heart attack and retired from day-to-day management. He still visited the business for a few hours each day to meet and greet the customers.

Pat's appeared in the 1976 film Rocky, and the restaurant installed a plaque where the character stood. The movie's popularity resulted in the restaurant becoming a better known destination for tourists, and it contributed to the ongoing friendly rivalry with Geno's. Pat's is a stop on the Philadelphia Visitor Center's official Rocky bus tour and the cast of Rocky the Musical did a promotional event there.

After pulling back from expansion and franchising efforts in the 1980s, the business was divided up by the Olivieri family. Harry's son, Frank, eventually bought out his father, sister and cousin and kept the original location, today run by Harry's grandson, Frank Jr. Pat's son Herbert opened disputed ownership of the business with Harry and his children and "Olivieri's Prince of Steaks", later to be the source of a family dispute (see below).

In the last few years of his life, Harry lived with his daughter in Brigantine, New Jersey. He died of heart failure on July 22, 2006, in Pomona, New Jersey, at the age of 90.

== Description ==
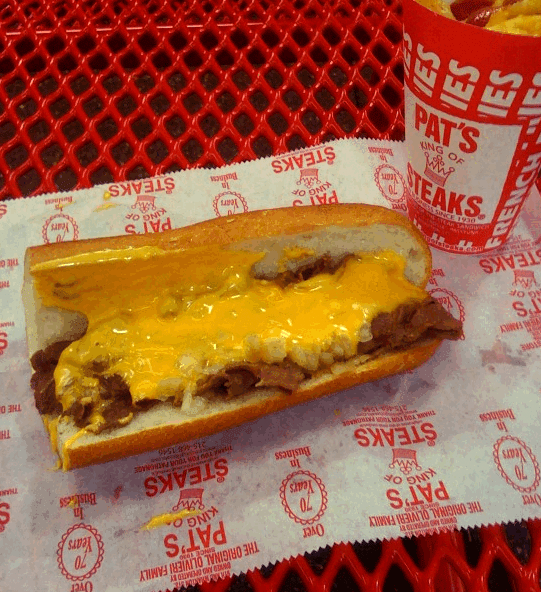
A "whiz wit" from Pat's accompanied by fries

A sign explains how to order; the customer asks for a variety of sandwich and then says "wit" or "wit-out" (i.e. 'with' or 'without' onions), a tongue-in-cheek reference to the Philadelphia accent. The varieties available are Cheez Whiz, provolone, regular American cheese, Cooper Sharp American cheese, and plain (no cheese).

Today Pat's and neighboring Geno's are considered by many locals to be tourist traps with classic but low-quality cheesesteaks. The Infatuation said of it, “It’s not a place you go willingly—or without being forced by your out-of-town cousin who watched Rocky once—but there are worse meat-on-bun options in the city (though not many).”

== Olivieri family feud ==
Pat's King of Steaks is the original shop opened by Pasquale "Pat" Olivieri and his brother, Harry. Harry's grandson, Frank, owns Pat's. Pat's grandson, Rick, owned Rick's Original Philly Steaks at Reading Terminal Market, which closed in October 2008. He subsequently opened and closed Rick's Steaks restaurants at other locations.

Pat's son Herbert (Rick's father) expanded the business by opening franchises of Pat's King of Steaks. In the 1980s, the Olivieris split up the business. Harry and Frank Sr. kept the original location, and Herbert opened Olivieri's Prince of Steaks in Reading Terminal Market. Herbert's son Rick renamed it "Rick's" in the mid-1990s, still using the crown logo and mentioning his grandfather, Pat Olivieri.

In October 2006, Pat's sued Rick's, alleging trademark infringement, trademark dilution, and unfair competition, based on the use of the crown logo and the name "Pat Olivieri".

The suit was settled in August 2007. Terms were not disclosed. Frank Olivieri Jr. said he was "...happy with the settlement and I'm sure my cousin Rick is, as well." Rick Olivieri told reporters, "It's an agreement we can both live with. Everybody is happy."

Rick Olivieri died in 2022 of frontotemporal degeneration.

== See also ==
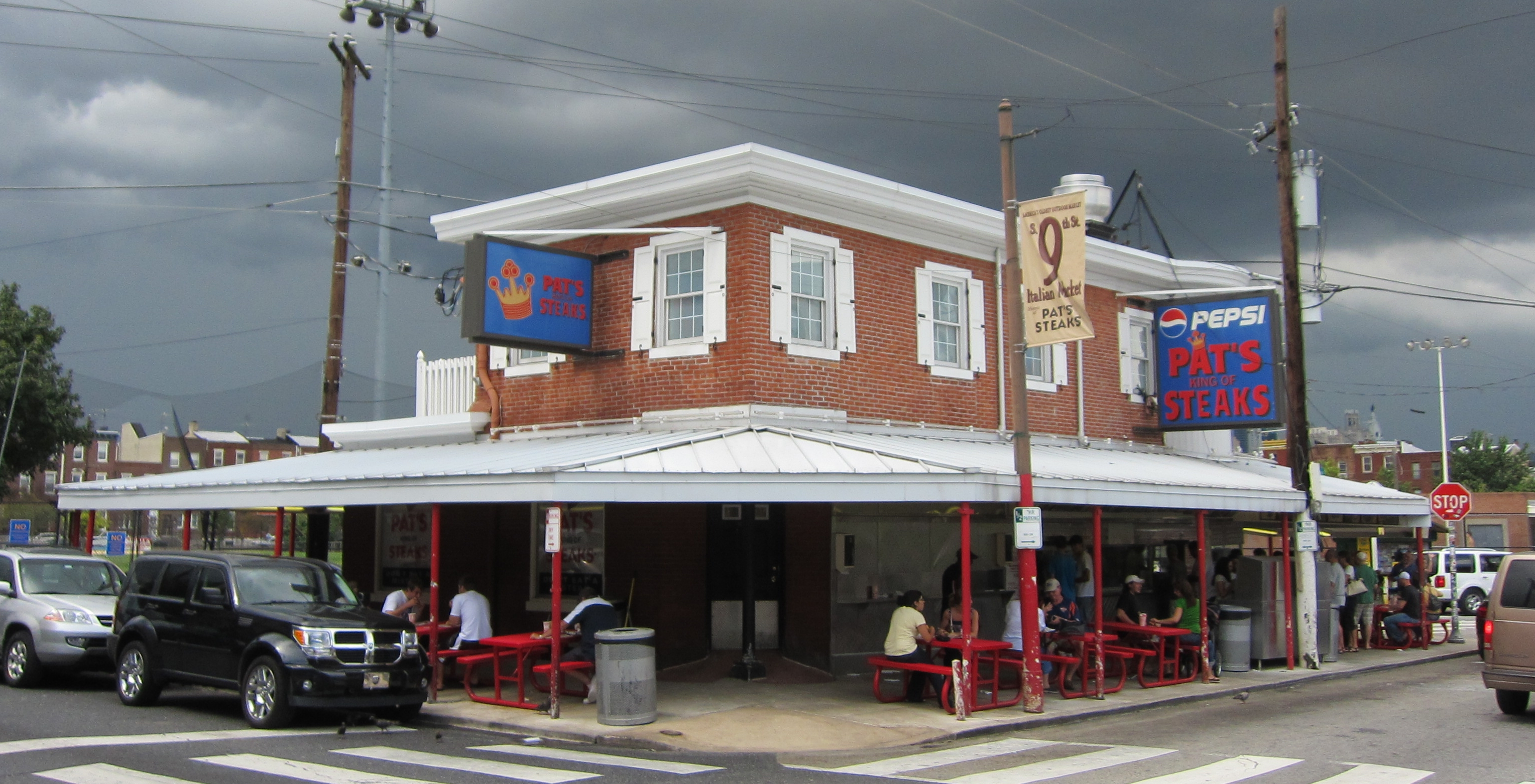
View from corner of South 9th and Wharton Streets

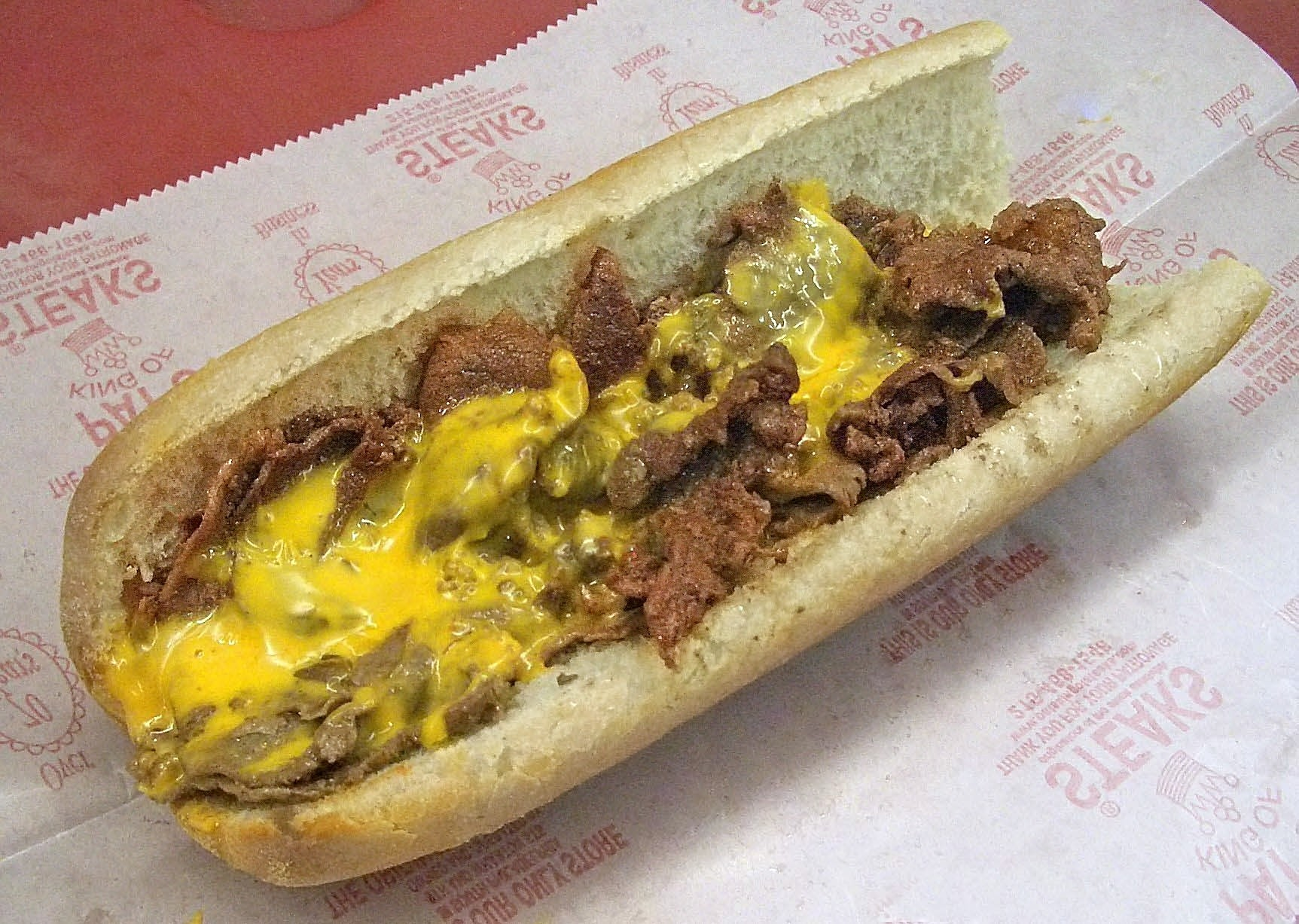
Pat's cheesesteak with Cheez Whiz

- Italian Market
- History of Italian Americans in Philadelphia
- List of submarine sandwich restaurants
