= Wharton, Philadelphia =

Wharton
- Neighborhood of Philadelphia
- Location within Philadelphia
- Country: United States
- State: Pennsylvania
- County: Philadelphia
- City: Philadelphia
- ZIP code: 19147
- Area codes: 215, 267 and 445

Wharton is a neighborhood in South Philadelphia, Pennsylvania, United States. Its boundaries are difficult to ascertain; the City of Philadelphia states it is along Wharton Street, west of Pennsport, and east of Point Breeze. According to this description, the neighborhood runs from about 4th Street to Broad, with no clear north to south boundaries. By other descriptions, the neighborhood runs from 8th to 13th Streets (east to west) and Wolf to Tasker Streets (south to north). This description places Wharton along the southern border of Passyunk Square.
