= Eliza Butler Kirkbride School =

- U.S. National Register of Historic Places
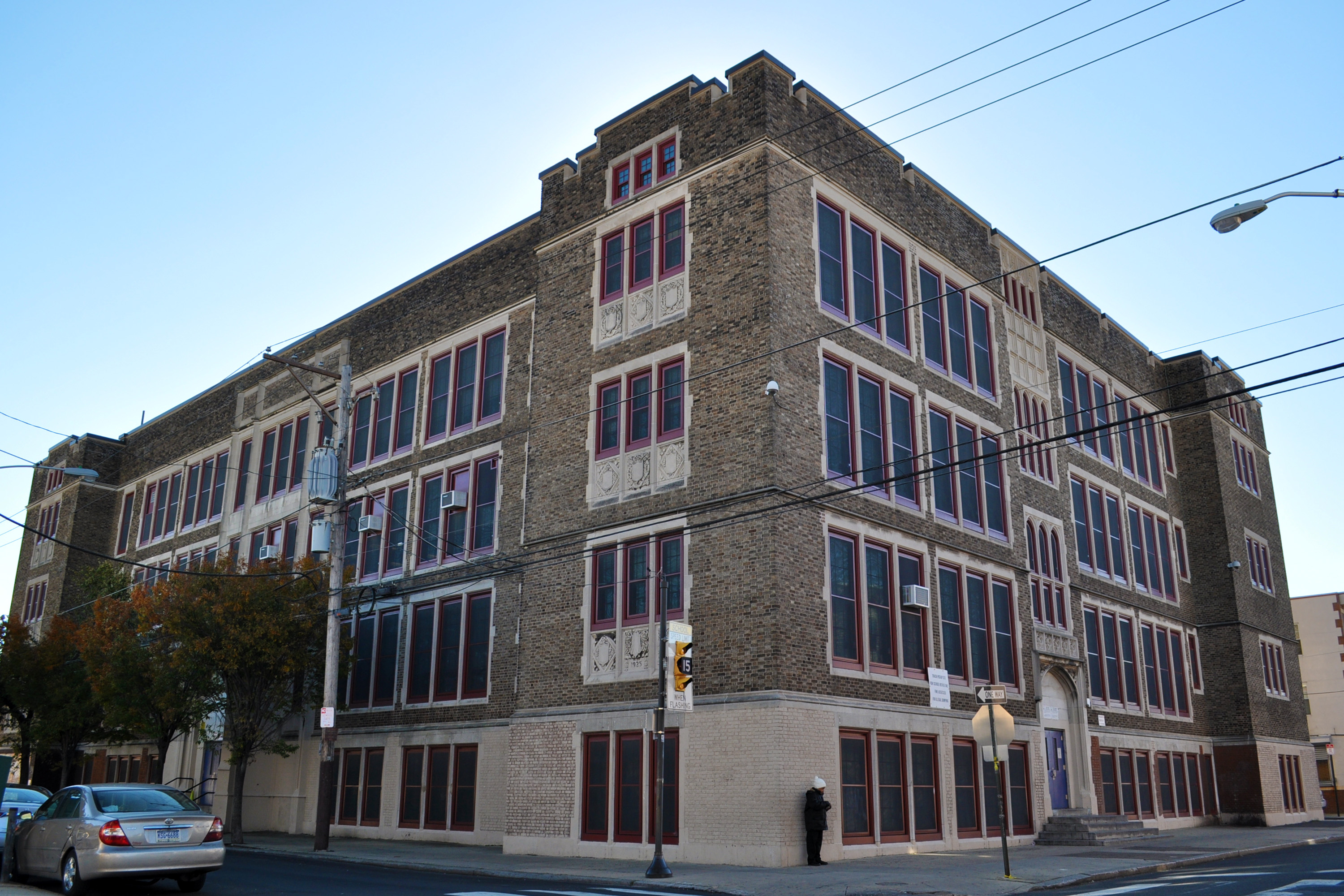
- Eliza Butler Kirkbride School

- Location within Philadelphia Location within Pennsylvania Location within the United States
- Location: 1501 S. 7th St., Philadelphia, Pennsylvania, U.S.
- Coordinates: 39°55′48″N 75°09′22″W
- Area: less than one acre
- Built: 1925–1926
- Built by: McCloskey & Co.
- Architect: Irwin T. Catharine
- Architectural style: Late Gothic Revival
- MPS: Philadelphia Public Schools TR
- NRHP reference No.: 88002290
- Added to NRHP: November 18, 1988

Eliza Butler Kirkbride School is a K–8 school located in the Passyunk Square neighborhood of Philadelphia, Pennsylvania. It is a part of the School District of Philadelphia.

The historic school building was designed by Irwin T. Catharine and built in 1925–1926. It is a four-story, five-bay, yellow reinforced concrete building faced in brick and limestone in the Late Gothic Revival-style. It features a projecting central entrance with floral and heraldic plaques in the spandrel, decorative panels, and a crenellated parapet. Each register contains three openings with limestone sills and lintels. A limestone dripcourse appears over the basement openings. The projecting end registers feature window bands with ornamental panels between the floors. These panels were a standard feature on some of Catharine's designs and often contained the datestone as one of the decorative panels.

It was added to the National Register of Historic Places in 1988.

== History ==
By 1990 the school had a Head Start Program preschool program.

== Demographics ==
In 1999 the school had 660 students, with over 50% of them being Asian.

In the 1998–1999 school year the school began a pilot bilingual English-Cambodian (Khmer) program for its immigrant students. By 1999 the school provided basic Cambodian lessons for the non-Cambodian students. In 1999 Cambodians made up almost 33% of the total student body.

As of 2015 the school has an English Language Learner (ELL) program with 200 students, with support from Chinese, Khmer, and Vietnamese-speaking counselor assistants, in addition to a bilingual counselor who speaks Chinese and Vietnamese.

== Feeder patterns ==
Neighborhoods assigned to Kirkbride are also assigned to Furness High School.

== Gallery ==
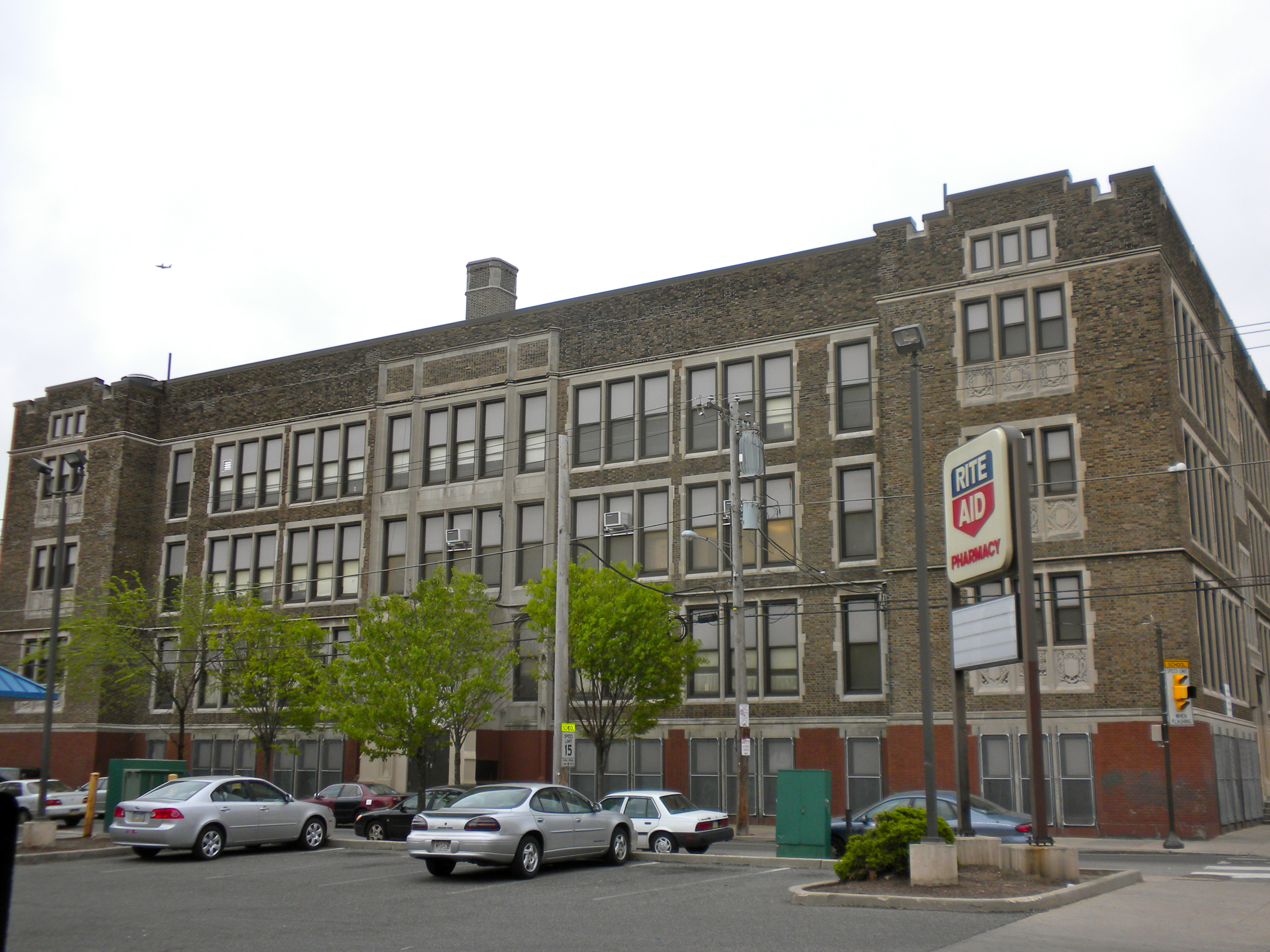

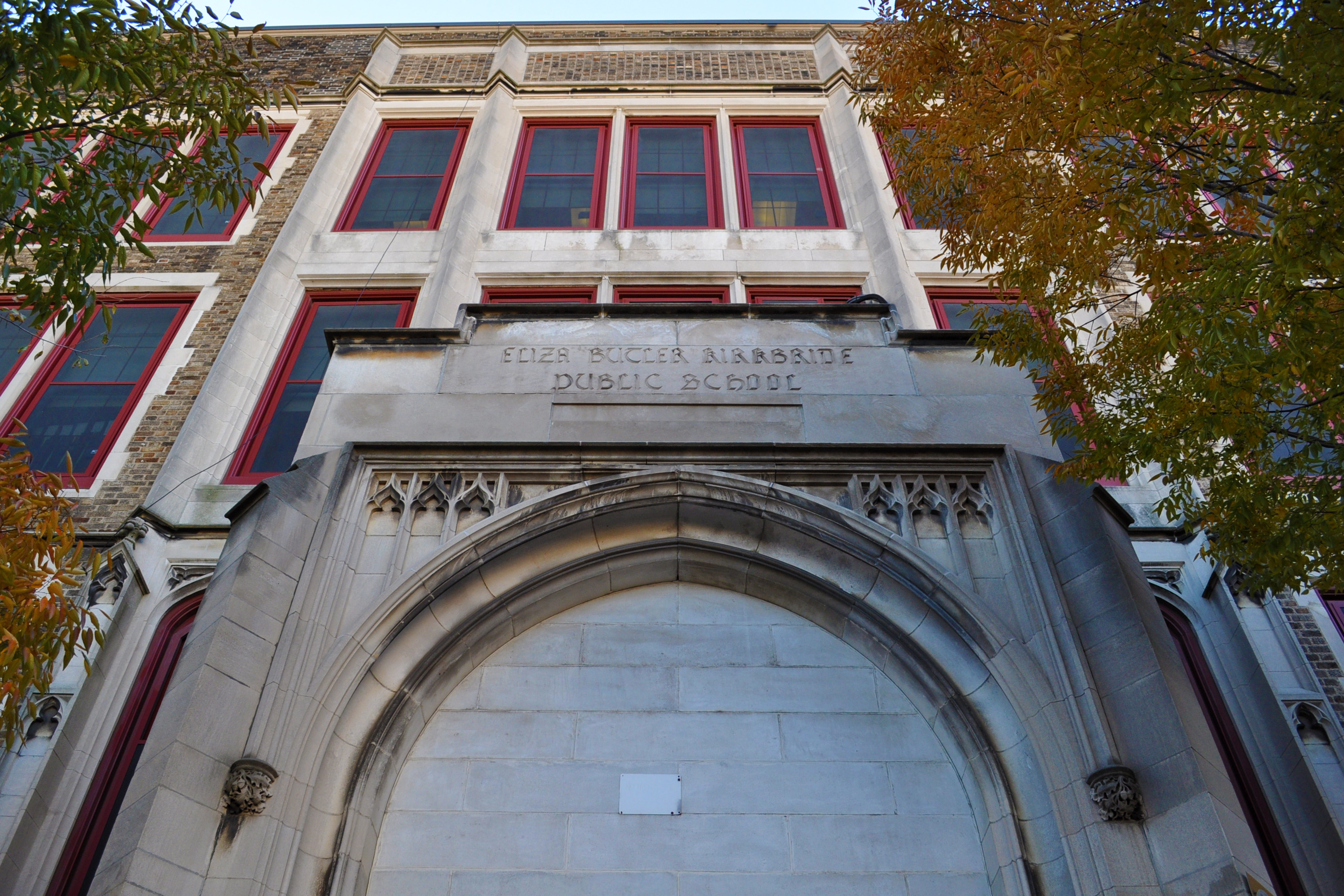

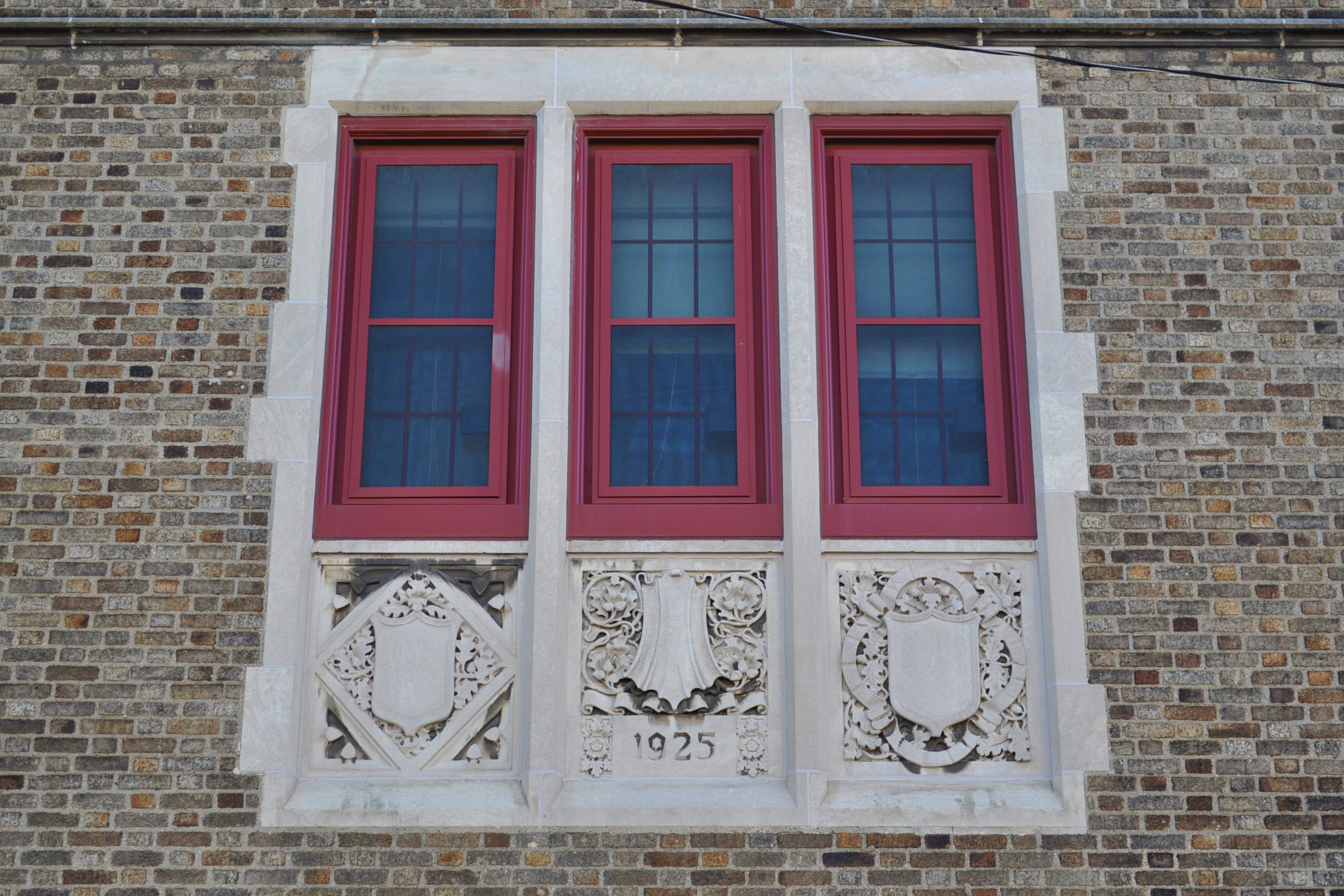
