= History of Italian Americans in Philadelphia =

Philadelphia has a significant Italian American population. In 2022, the American Community Survey estimated that in the Philadelphia metropolitan region 287,703 residents were of entirely Italian ancestry and 839,275 had some Italian ancestry.

== History ==
During the 18th century Colonial Era of the United States, the few Italian immigrants to come to Philadelphia came in small numbers and from higher class backgrounds, and these few Italians were often considered to be accomplished in business, art, and music. Some early Italian settlements appeared in South Philadelphia. In contrast to the vast majority of Italian immigrants to Philadelphia that arrived much later and originated from impoverished areas of Southern Italy, Italian immigrants from this period predominantly originated from wealthier areas in Northern Italy and towns within Genoa Province, Liguria, including Genoa and Chiavari, while only a small number came from Veneto. Donna J. Di Giacomo, author of Italians in Philadelphia, wrote that the first population was "in much smaller numbers" than the mass immigrant groups of the late 19th century and 20th century. At the time, many educated Americans had a positive view of classical culture, and thus their view of Northern Italian immigrants was more positive. Among the immigrants of this first period, Lorenzo Da Ponte, who immigrated in 1804, helped introduce Italian opera in America.

In 1819 Silvio Pellico wrote in "Breve soggiorno in Milano di Battistino Barometro" that some Italian immigrants were going to Philadelphia. Charles L. Flynn, Jr. of Assumption College stated in his book review of Building Little Italy that the Philadelphia Italian "community" didn't actually form until the 1850s and 1860s, when it achieved enough size to do so. There were 117 Philadelphia residents at the time known to have been born in Italy. By the 1870 census this increased to 517, with 82% of them living in South Philadelphia.

By the end of the 19th century and the 20th century, Italians immigrating to Philadelphia mainly came from peasant villages in Southern Italy and were from lower socioeconomic backgrounds. During that era, most Italians came to the United States and worked as unskilled manual laborers, often saving money to send back home to family in the form of remittance. A significant number would return to Italy as so-called "birds of passage", though eventually many other poor Italian immigrants would stay in Philadelphia and establish communities, especially in South Philadelphia. Immigrants in the later period mostly originated from Abruzzo, Avellino and Salerno in Campania, and Messina in Sicily. The public had a very negative perception of the poorer, swarthy Southern Italians, especially as the media focused on crimes and bad behavior, resulting in harsh discrimination against Italians and the redlining of Italian neighborhoods.

== Demographics ==
In the community's initial history (circa prior to the 1850s-1860s) about 67% of the residents were male, and about 67% were ages 15–44. The pre-1870 Italian community did not include labor agents. During that period Italians were concentrated in wards 2 through 5 in South Philadelphia.

By the early 20th century the ratio between families with children and male workers decreased.

The Ligurians held leadership roles within the Italian community during the 19th and 20th centuries.

== Geography ==
The largest and oldest Italian community is located in South Philadelphia. Other neighborhoods with historical Italian settlements include East Falls, Germantown, and Manayunk. As of 2007 some Italian businesses still operate in Chestnut Hill.

Italians began settling Germantown in 1880. The Italian community in South Philadelphia was, at a later point, reduced in size due to Italians moving to South Jersey and other parts of the Greater Philadelphia area. Italians especially moved to Washington Township. Di Giacomo wrote in 2007 that "the Germantown settlement is 98 percent gone today".

== Economy ==
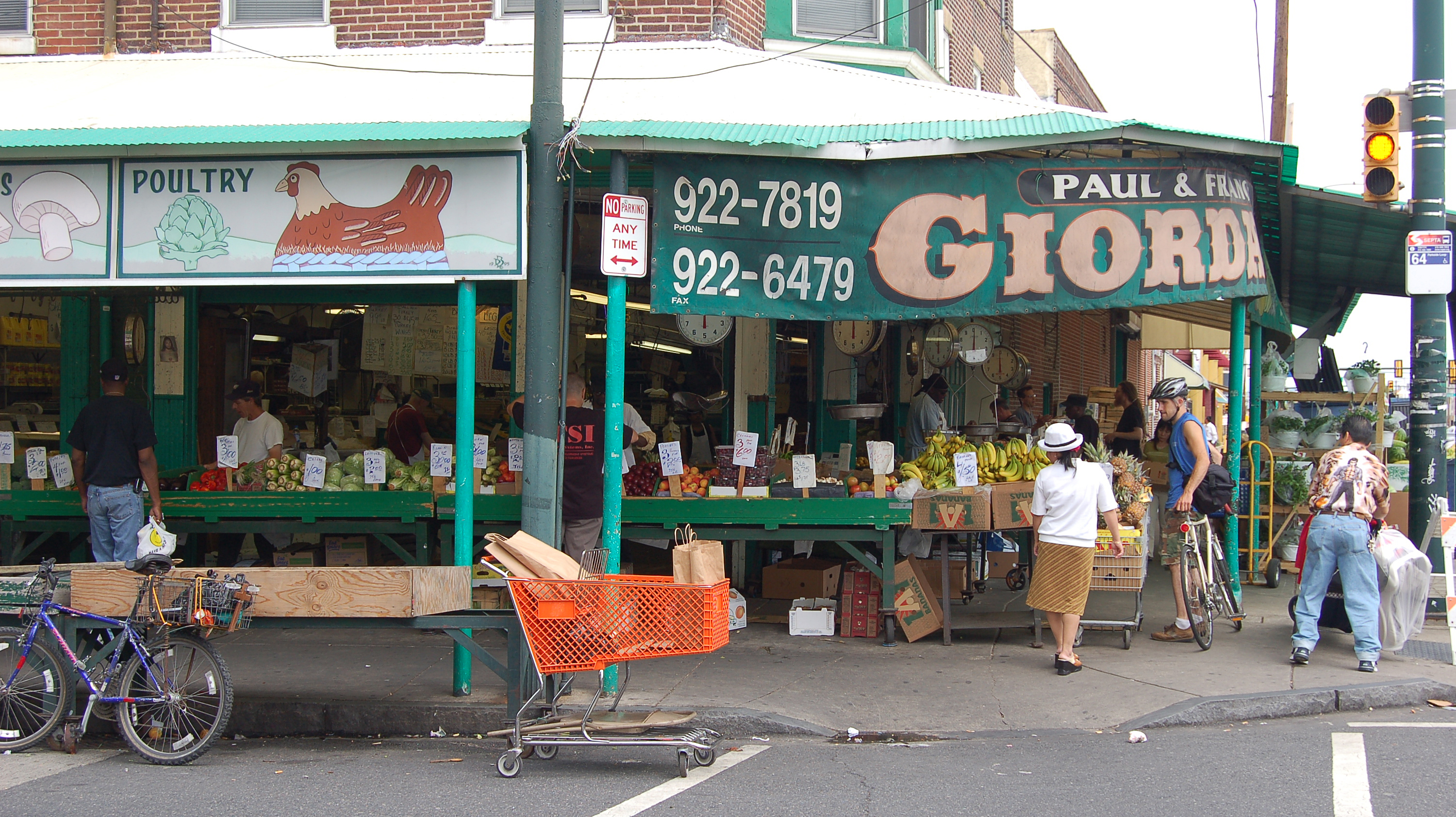
Philadelphia Italian Market

The Italian Market is located in South Philadelphia. The Philadelphia area has a large number of Italian restaurants.

== Media ==
Historically the Italian newspapers in Philadelphia included La Libera Parola, L'Opinione, and Il Popolo Italiano. The United Presbyterian Church publication was Vita. Ordine Nuovo was the newspaper of the Sons of Italy.

== Organized crime ==
The Philadelphia crime family, also known as the Philadelphia Mafia, is an Italian-American Mafia family based in South Philadelphia. This criminal organization primarily operates in various areas and neighborhoods in Philadelphia, the Greater Philadelphia Metropolitan Area (i.e. the Delaware Valley) and New Jersey, especially South Jersey. The family is notorious for its violence, due in particular to its succession of violent bosses and multiple mob wars. As the Bruno crime family under the 21-year reign of boss Angelo Bruno (1959–1980), the family enjoyed an era of peace and prosperity. A complex dispute involving disgruntled subordinates and territory claims by New York's Genovese crime family led to Bruno's murder in 1980. The killing marked the beginning of years of internal violence for control of the Philadelphia family, leading to a gradual decline in the family's stability.

== Religion ==
Italians coming to Philadelphia were predominantly Catholic. Di Giacomo wrote "The church was the focal point of neighborhood life. Nearly everything, from baptisms to funerals, played out in or around the church." Some Italians were Protestant. The Protestants included Baptists, Presbyterians, Evangelicals, and Pentecostals. In South Philadelphia second and third generations of Protestants left at a much quicker rate compared to Catholics of the same generation.

In 1852 St. Mary Magdalen de Pazzi in South Philadelphia, the first Italian Catholic parish in the United States, was founded by pre-mass immigration Italians.

In 1898 Southern Italians who felt alienated from the St. Mary's Catholic Church due to their southern background and from the Irish St. Peter's Catholic Church founded the Our Lady of Good Counsel Church (Italian: La Chiesa Nostra Signora del Buon Consiglio). In 1933 the Roman Catholic Archdiocese of Philadelphia closed Our Lady of Good Counsel. Di Giacomo wrote that "The church's constant activity is legendary to this day."

One Italian church, St. Rita of Cascia (in South Philadelphia at Broad and Ellsworth Streets), is now a shrine. Other Italian Catholic churches include King of Peace and St. Nicholas of Tolentine. The Presbyterian church had three Italian churches, with one in South Philadelphia, one in Germantown, and one in Overbrook.

== Institutions ==
The first Italian mutual aid society, the Società Italiana di Unione e Fratellanza, was organized in 1867.

The Consulate-General of Italy in Philadelphia is located in Center City, Philadelphia.

== Notable people ==
- Al Alberts (Al Albertini), singer, composer
- Frankie Avalon (Frank Avallone), singer, actor, teen idol
- Charles Carmine Antonio Baldi (C.C.A. Baldi), merchant, banker, newspaper publisher, entrepreneur and philanthropist
- Toni Basil (Antonia Christina Basilotta), singer-songwriter, actress, filmmaker, film director, choreographer, dancer, singer of "Mickey"
- Maria Bello, actress, writer
- Jerry Blavat, disc jockey, performer, "The Geator with The Heater"
- Ben Bova, writer, six-time winner of the Hugo Award
- Angelo Bruno, Don of Philadelphia crime family
- Tony Bruno, sports talk radio personality
- Roy Campanella, Hall of Fame baseball player, Brooklyn Dodgers
- John Cappelletti, football player
- Gia Carangi, fashion model
- Angelo Cataldi, sports talk radio personality
- Henry Cianfrani, politician
- Gus Cifelli, football player
- Bradley Cooper, actor, producer
- Jim Croce, Folk singer, songwriter
- Pat Croce, President of the Philadelphia 76ers
- Nick Falcon, founding member of rockabilly band "Young Werewolves"
- Angelo Dundee (Angelo Mirena), boxing trainer and cornerman
- Lawrence M. Farnese, Jr., attorney, politician
- Linda Fiorentino, actress
- Fabian Forte (entertainer), singer, actor, Teen idol
- Sam Fogarino, drummer for the band Interpol
- Thomas Foglietta (U.S. ambassador to Italy), United States Ambassador to Italy
- Vince Fumo, lawyer, politician
- Joseph Genaro, co-founder, guitarist, co-lead vocalist of The Dead Milkmen
- Alexander Giannascoli, musician, multi instrumentalist, stage name: Alex G
- Joey Giardello, world middleweight champion from 1963 to 1965
- Charlie Gracie, Rock 'N' Roll pioneer, singer
- Buddy Greco, jazz, pop singer
- William "Wild Bill" Guarnere, soldier, "Band of Brothers"
- Frank Guarrera, opera singer, Metropolitan Opera
- Natalie Guercio, "Mob Wife"
- Tommy Gunn, pornographic film actor
- Dom Irrera, stand-up comedian, actor
- Eddie Lang (Salvatore Massaro), "The Father of Jazz Guitar"
- Mario Lanza, actor, tenor
- Joey Lawrence (Joseph Lawrence Mignogna, Jr), actor, singer, game show host
- Tony Luke, Jr., Founder, cheesesteak franchise Tony Luke's
- Tony Mammarella, first producer and second host of American Bandstand
- Bob Marcucci, Manager, Frankie Avalon, Fabian, amongst other Teen idols
- Al Martino, singer, actor
- Pat Martino, jazz guitarist
- John Marzano, baseball player
- Joey Merlino, Don of Philadelphia crime family
- Mike Missanelli, sports radio personality
- Kelly Monaco, actress, model
- Vincent Montana Jr., composer, arranger, vibraphonist, and percussionist, known as "the Godfather of disco"
- Willie Mosconi, "Mr. Pocket Billiards", professional pool (pocket billiards) player, helped to popularize pool as a national recreation activity
- Pat Olivieri, co-creator of the Philly Cheesesteak.
- Harry Olivieri, co-creator of the Philly Cheesesteak.
- Frank Palumbo, owner of Palumbo's, an entertainment complex in South Philadelphia
- Vince Papale, Football player, inspiration for the 2006 movie Invincible
- Lisa Peluso, soap opera actress
- Christina Perri, singer, songwriter
- Nick Perri, founding member of rock band "Silvertide"
- Robert Picardo, actor, singer
- Jon Polito, actor, voice artist
- Frank Rizzo, First and only Italian Philadelphia Police Commissioner, 93rd mayor
- Bobby Rydell (Robert Louis Ridarelli), Teen idol, singer, actor
- Nicodemo Scarfo, Don of Philadelphia crime family
- Lisa Scottoline, author
- Sylvester Stallone, actor, filmmaker, screenwriter
- Joey Stefano, pornographic film actor
- Lawrence Venuti, translator, translation theorist, translation historian
- Anna C. Verna, President of the Philadelphia City Council
- Lee Ving (Lee James Jude Capallero), musician, actor, lead singer of punk band "Fear"
- Tony Voce, hockey player

== In popular culture ==
The ABC show Abbott Elementary (2021–present) depicted Melissa Schemmenti, a South Philadelphia-based teacher with Italian heritage.

== See also ==
- Philadelphia crime family, aka "The Mafia"
- Demographics of Philadelphia
- Italian Americans
