= Italian Market, Philadelphia =

Market area in south Philadelphia

South 9th Street Curb Market
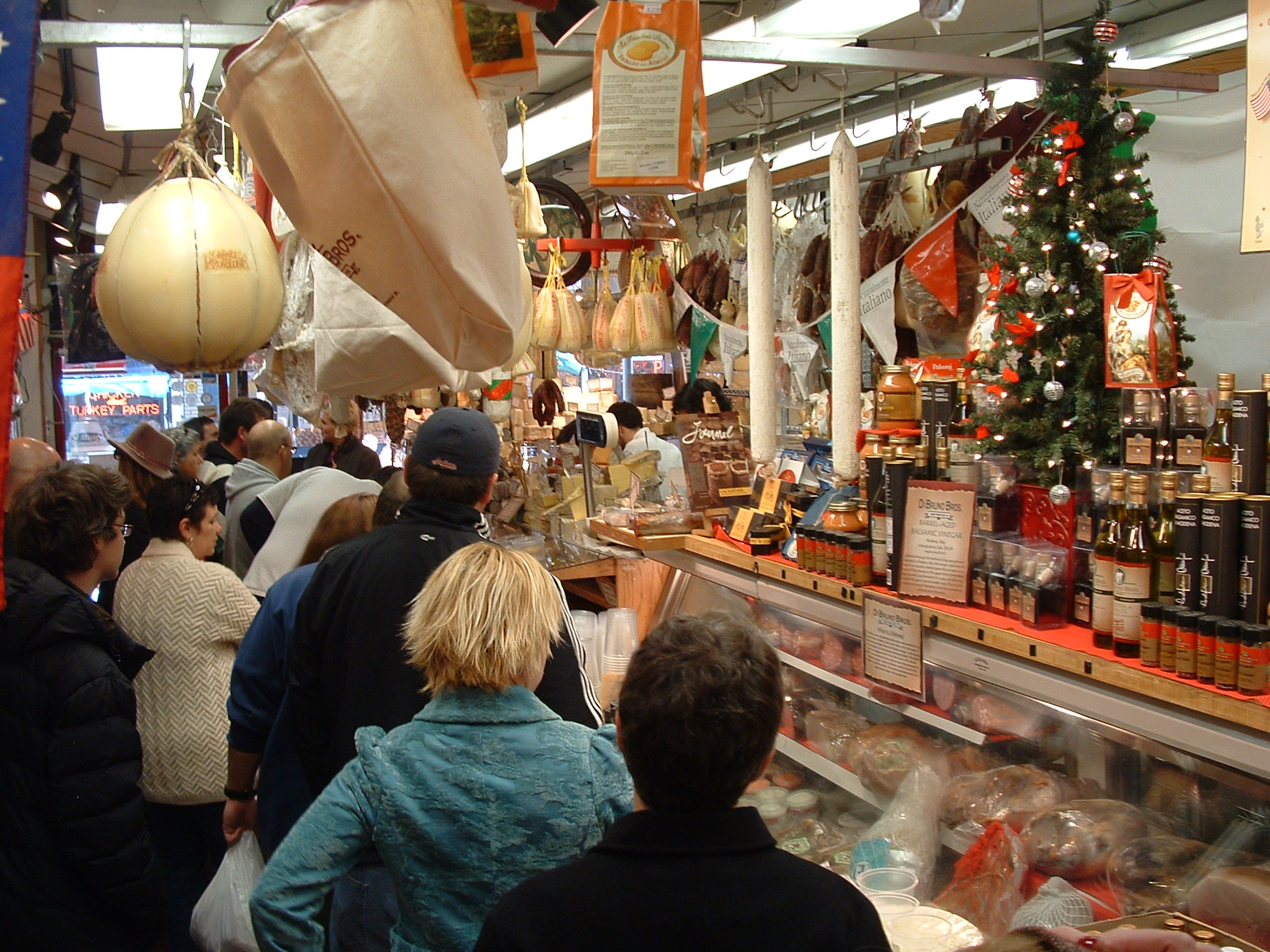
- A weekend crowd during the Christmas season at Di Bruno Bros. cheese shop in the Italian Market

- Location within Philadelphia
- 39.939°N 75.1578°W
- Location: Bella Vista, Philadelphia, Pennsylvania, U.S.

The Italian Market is the popular name for the South 9th Street Curb Market, an area of South Philadelphia featuring awning covered sidewalks, curb carts, grocery shops, cafes, restaurants, bakeries, cheese shops, butcher shops, etc., many with an Italian influence. The historical heart of the market is the area of 9th Street between Christian Street and Washington Avenue, the commercial district chartered in 1915, the South Ninth Street Business Men's Association, covered the area between Catharine to Federal and Eighth to Tenth streets, and the market is now generally considered to extend from Fitzwater Street at the north to Federal Street at the south. The term Italian Market is also used to generally describe the surrounding neighborhood between South Street to the North and Wharton Street to the South running a few blocks to the east and west of 9th street.

Although it is considered the social and commercial heart of the Philadelphia Italian community, the Ninth Street Market also contained many Jewish businesses in its inception. In recent years, an influx of immigrants from Latin America, mainly from Mexico and to a lesser degree from Central American countries like Guatemala and El Salvador, has significantly contributed to the Italian Market area, and, in the southern Italian Market in particular, the Market is now also home to many stores and restaurants catering to South Philadelphia's Hispanic population in addition to the Italian-American community.

== History ==
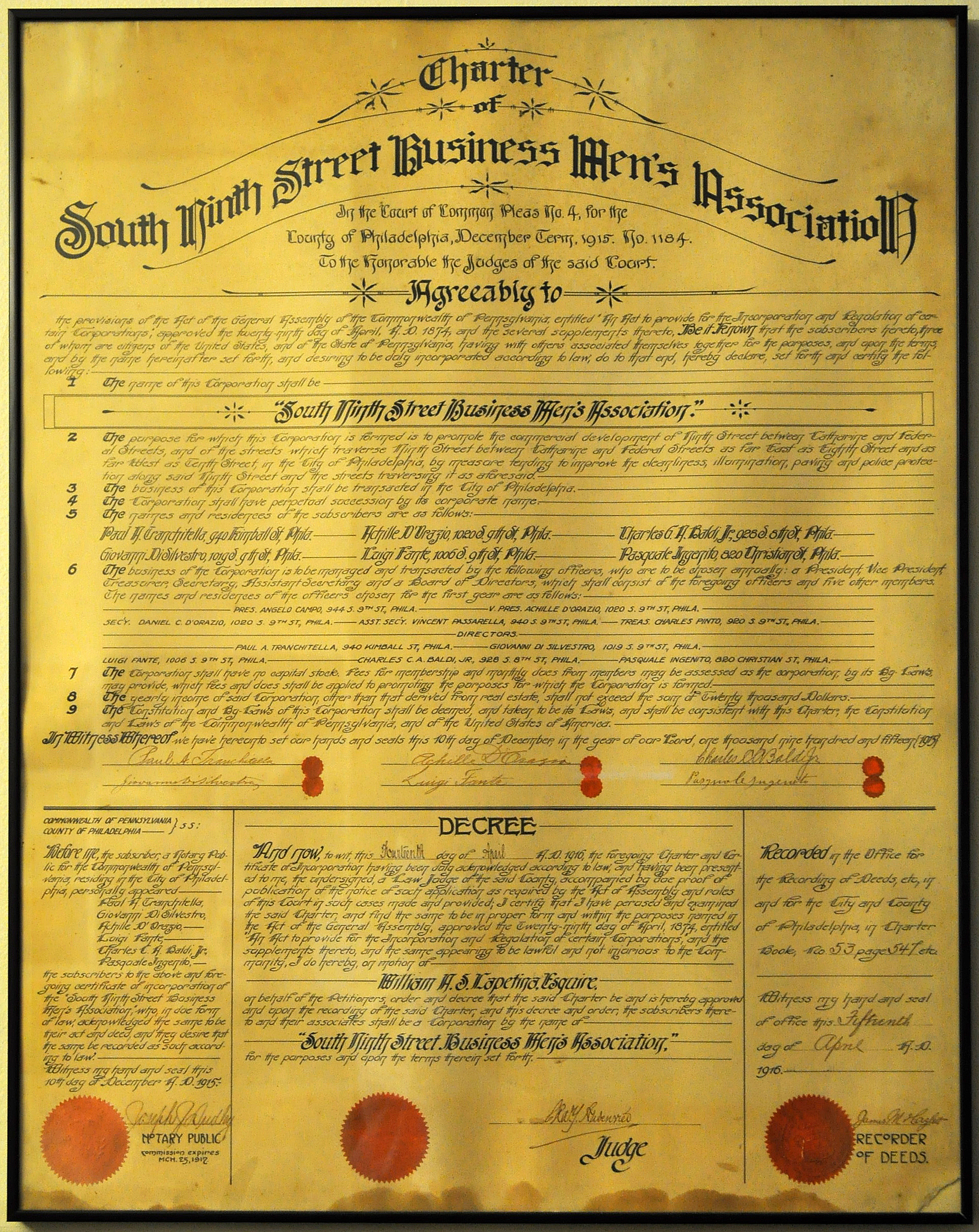
Charter of South Ninth Street Business Men's Association (1915)

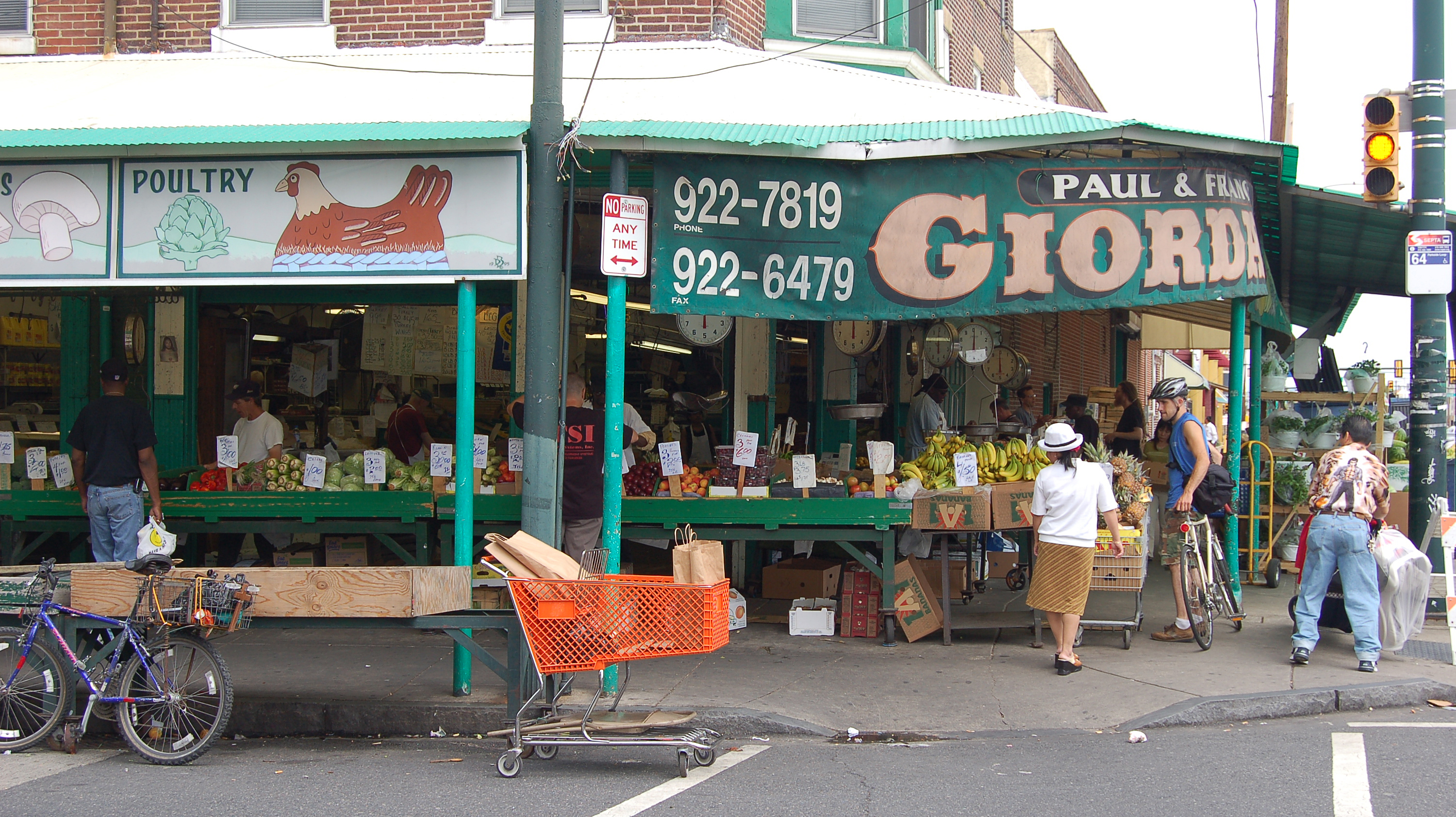
One of the produce vendors along the market

9th Street, frequently referred to simply as The Italian Market, has its origins as a marketplace in the late 19th and early 20th centuries. The area, outside the original boundaries of William Penn's planned city, was an area for immigrants to settle. Italians began to move into the area around 1884, when Antonio Palumbo began receiving Italian immigrants into his boardinghouse. Shops along 9th Street opened up shortly after to cater to the new Italian community and have remained in the area to this day, with many of the present vendors tracing the founding of their businesses back to the first decade of the 20th century.

The area continues to attract new immigrants as a significant number of Vietnamese, Korean, Chinese and Mexican-run businesses have joined the traditional Italian shops in the market. Many new Mexican stores have opened up around the market. Many Latino immigrants also work in the market.

The market also plays host to the annual Italian Market Festival with music, activities, and food.

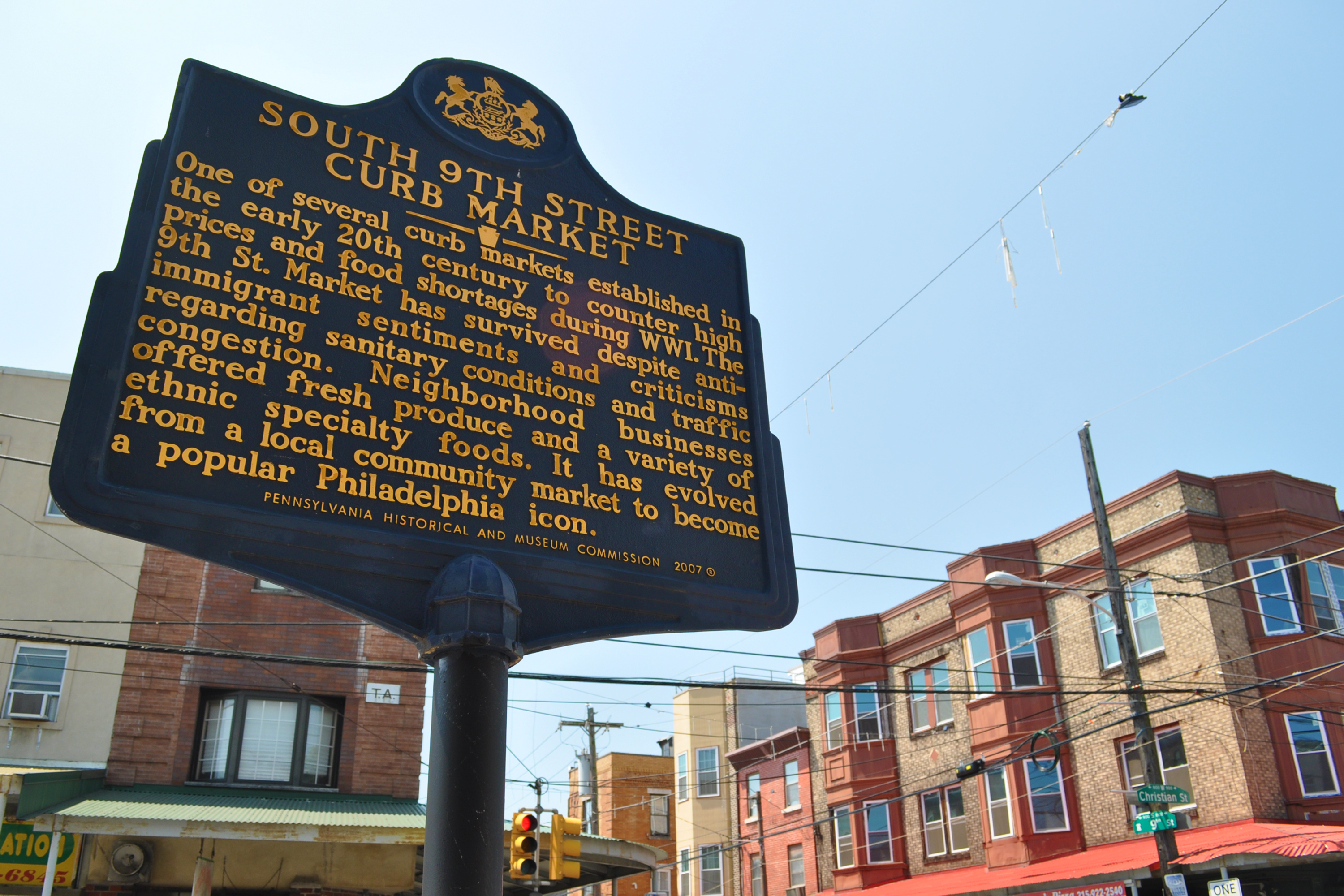
South 9th Street Curb Market historical marker

One of several curb markets established in the early 20th century offering fresh produce and a variety of ethnic specialty foods, it has evolved into a popular Philadelphia icon. On October 12, 2007, the Market was honored by the dedication of a Pennsylvania State Historical Marker as the "South 9th Street Curb Market" at the NE corner of 9th and Christian Streets.

An unofficial historical marker was erected just in front of the since-removed Frank Rizzo mural at 9th and Montrose Sts in 2008. The marker, entitled "The Italian Market," briefly explains about the Italian market area forming a business association in the early 1900s. The officers of the association were of central and southern Italian and eastern Sicilian heritages. The other members of the association were of northern and eastern European, Lebanese and Asian heritages.

== COVID-19 pandemic–present ==
During the height of the pandemic, in 2020, the market offered safer outdoor shopping, playing to its natural strength. At the same time, outdoor seating expanded—notably, with the addition of a parklet or streetery at Anthony's Coffee House, conversion of parking to dining at DiBruno's Piazza across the street, and the newly poured concrete patio of just-opened Alma Del Mar, as well as several parklets further south at Mole Poblano and Casa Mexico. The market saw some of the greatest expansions of outdoor dining in 2020 in the city, and many of which have remained since, replacing blighted boarded-up properties or the more-weathered curb stands.

And while the attempt to form a business improvement district was shelved shortly before the pandemic, several new initiatives have breathed new life into the market, including an art project that aims to connect the market and tell the stories of its vendors. Artists such as Jon Rubin, Theresa Rose, and more recently, Michelle Angela Ortiz, have promoted the merchants while addressing some of their pain points such as barriers to resources, promotion, and aesthetic appeal. In addition to the COVID-prompted outdoor revitalization, the city's Commerce Department received new funding (thanks to then-councilmember Parker), allowing S 9th Street to initiate its first-ever managed street sweeping program, running three mornings a week (the neighborhood association was already sweeping the surrounding streets via a crowd-funded effort). A newly-formed Business Association of Mexican Merchants is holding a first annual Day of the Dead festival in 2024. The market—once classified blighted by Planning in 2000—has made great strides to be a more diverse and vibrant destination where everyone feels welcomed.

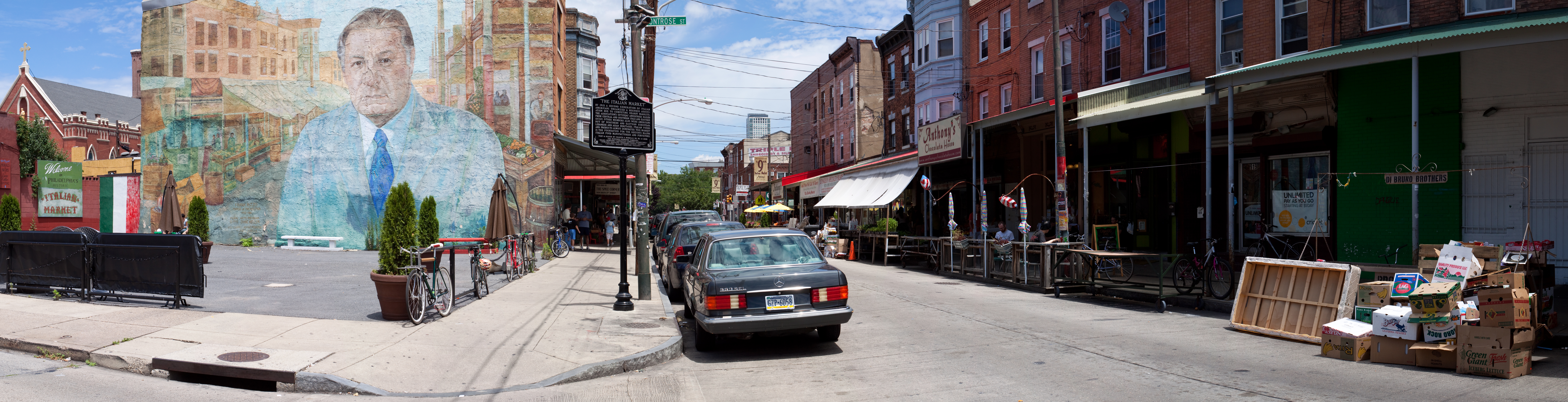
An overview of South 9th Street, which is the location for the Italian Market. Subject of mural is Frank Rizzo, former Mayor of Philadelphia, Philadelphia Police Commissioner and notable Italian-Philadelphian. The mural was painted over on June 7, 2020, at the request of Mural Arts, a nonprofit that maintained the mural.

== In popular culture ==
The market plays a role in the culture of Philadelphia, often being included in cultural depictions of the city. One example, the Italian Market was featured in Rocky and Rocky II, most notably in the running/training montage where a vendor tosses the boxer an orange in the first film. The television series Hack also filmed several episodes that featured the Italian Market, and it was also featured on a season 5 episode of the television show It's Always Sunny in Philadelphia.

== Gallery ==
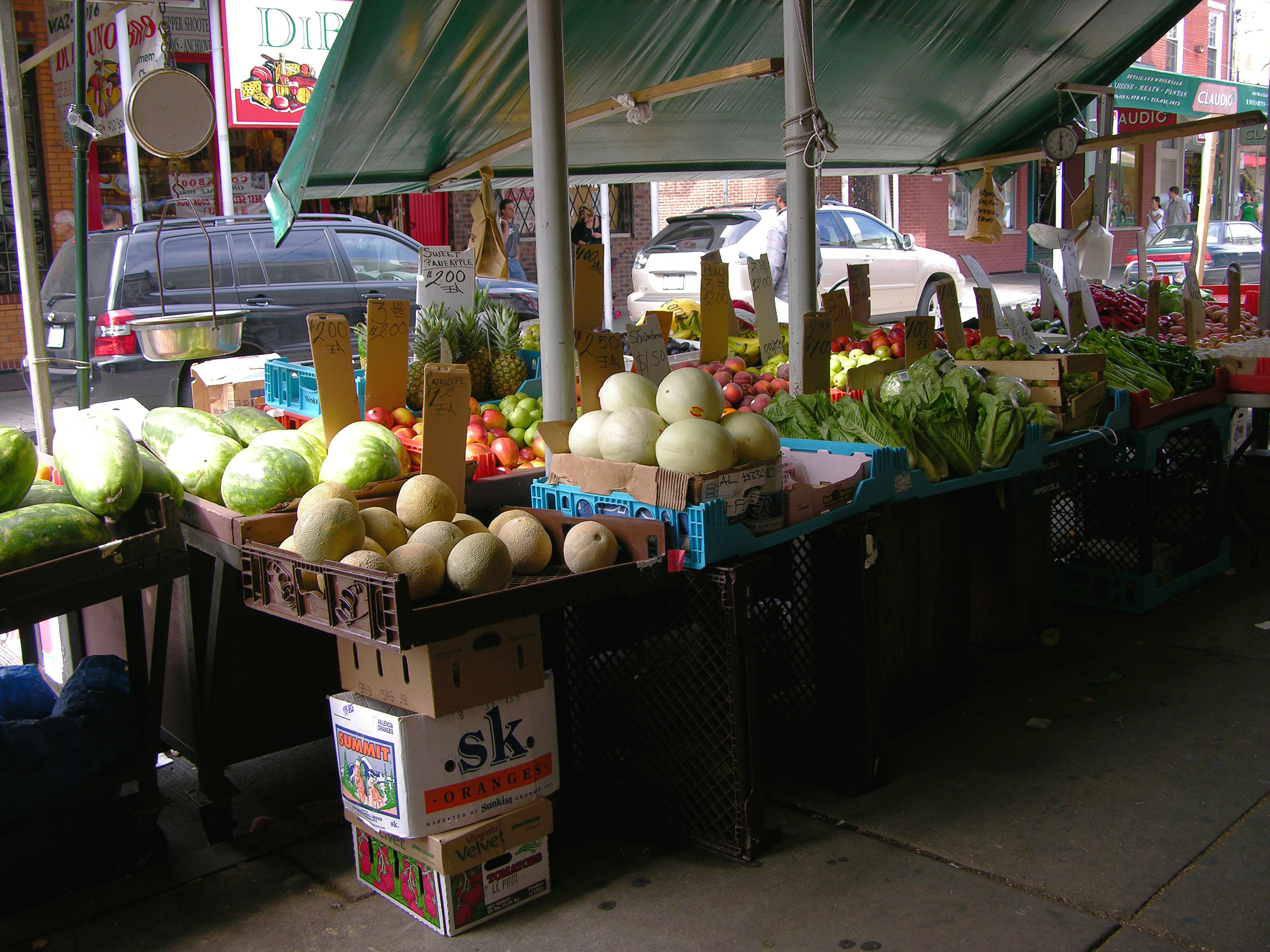

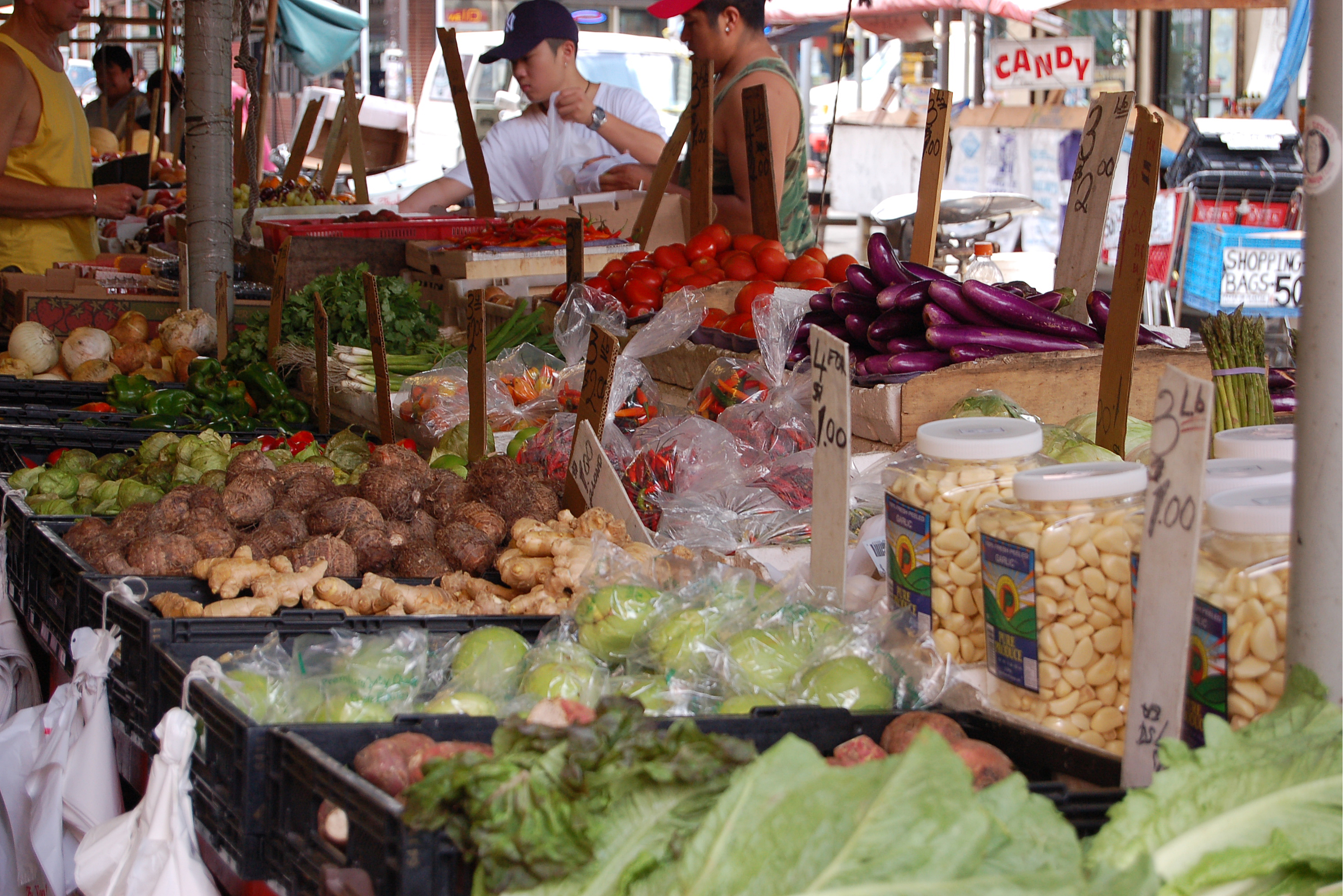

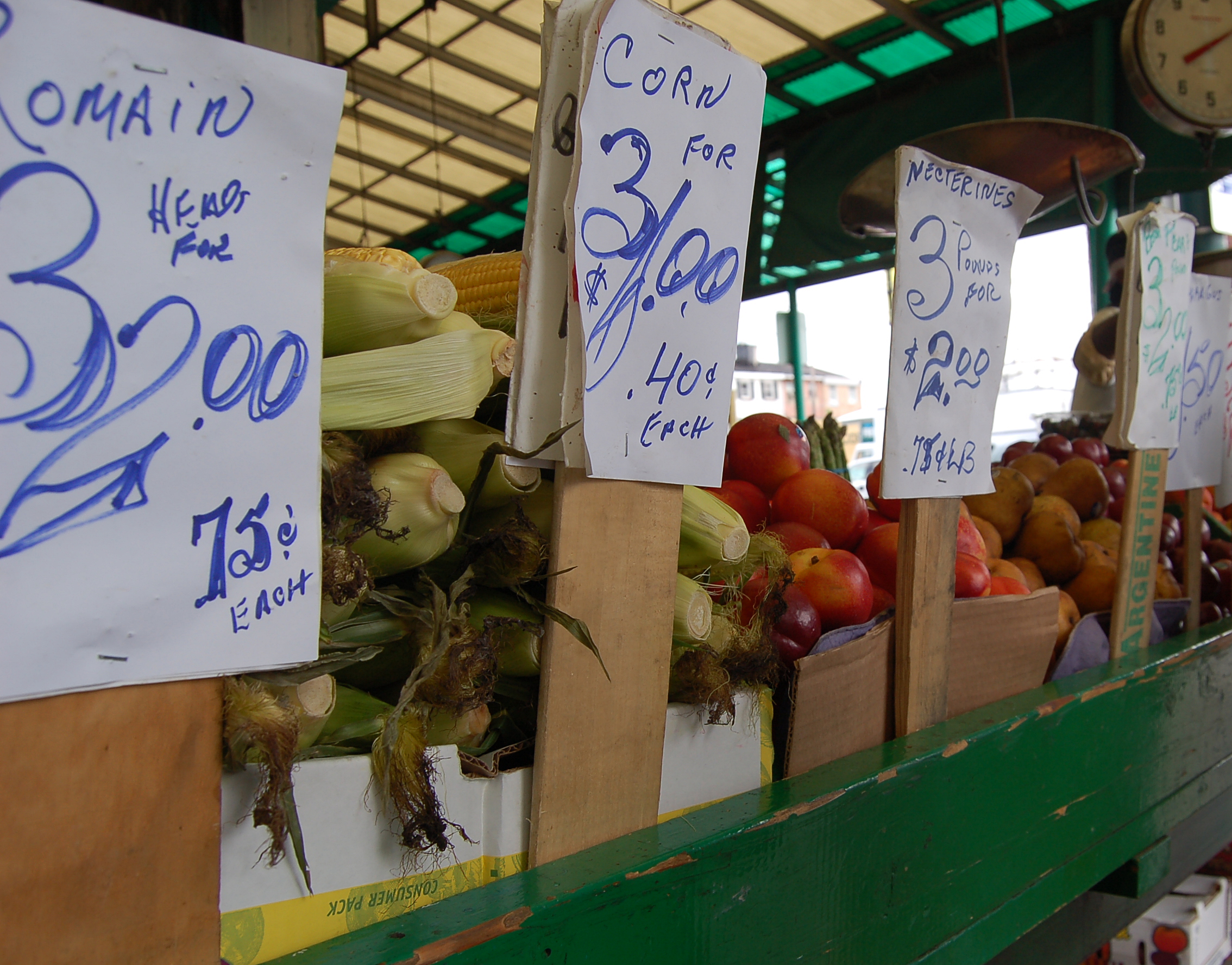

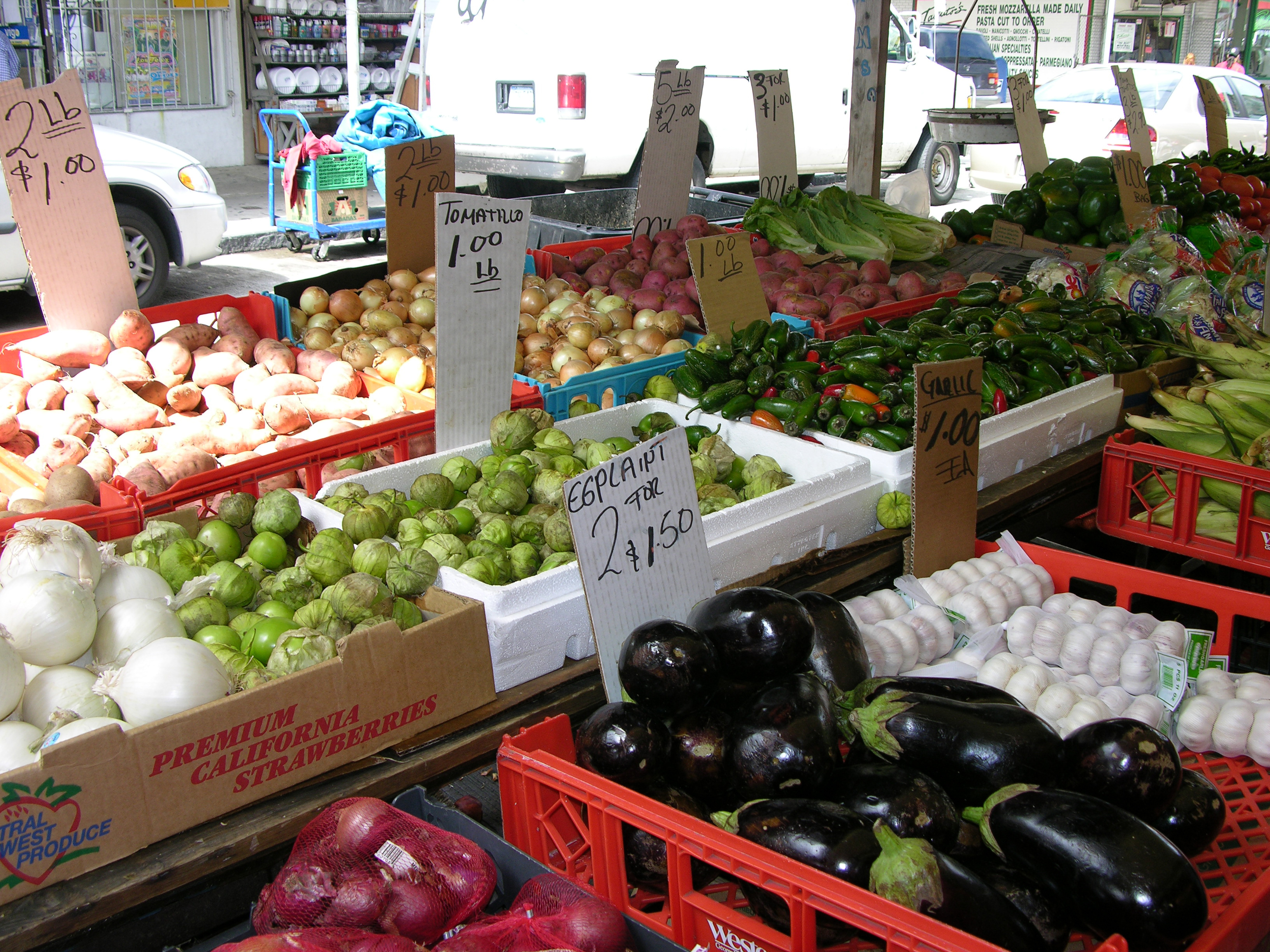

== See also ==
- Pat's King of Steaks
- Geno's Steaks
- History of the Italian Americans in Philadelphia
- Frank Palumbo and Palumbo's
- Little Saigon, Philadelphia, a neighborhood that it is intertwined with.
- Washington Avenue Historic District (Philadelphia, Pennsylvania)
