= Frank Palumbo =

American political boss, entrepreneur, and racketeer (1911–1983)

- Born: May 23, 1911
- Died: February 12, 1983 (aged 71); Merion Station, Pennsylvania, U.S.
- Spouse: Kippee Valez

Frank Palumbo (May 23, 1911 – February 12, 1983) was an American power broker, political boss, entrepreneur, and racketeer in Philadelphia, Pennsylvania.

He is best known as the owner of Palumbo's, an entertainment complex in South Philadelphia, Nostalgia's Restaurant and the Click Club. In the city, he is still widely known for his philanthropy: donating animals to the Philadelphia Zoo, helping build youth programs and funding parades. He has been called "a supporter of politicians, ordinary folk and animals."

Palumbo expanded a boarding house his grandfather, Antonio Palumbo, had started in 1884 into an entertainment complex. Palumbo held significant unofficial political power throughout the city.

In the 1940s and 1950s, Philadelphia was an important pop music center, with many bands and singers being made or broken in the city at Palumbo's clubs.

Palumbo became well known for philanthropy throughout South Philadelphia. Disturbed by an article critical of the area, singer Mario Lanza penned a response which identified Palumbo as an unsung hero of the city. Lanza lauded Palumbo for taking thousands of orphans to the circus, arranging parades for visiting celebrities and buying animals for the zoo.

== Personal life ==
Palumbo was born on May 23, 1911. He was quiet and shy, often hiding in his office during major functions and banquets, only briefly emerging to meet with the guests.

Palumbo's wife Vanda "Kippee" Bozzacco (1919–2003) was a former actress and, at Palumbo's side, became "one of Philadelphia's first ladies".

== Night clubs ==
Palumbo owned and operated numerous Philadelphia night clubs, including Nostalgia's Restaurant, the legendary Click Club, Ciro's, Palumbo's, the Thirteen Club, the Hideaway, the S.A. Club, and the 20th Century clubs, all located in the vicinity of 13th and Locust Streets, the heart of Philadelphia's nightclub district. By connecting all of the clubs through a series of doors, Palumbo operated all of them with a single hard to obtain liquor license, possible only through his political connections at the state Liquor Control Board.

The Click Club featured the world's longest bar and a rotating stage large enough for two bands, so as to provide uninterrupted music. To promote the club's opening on Labor Day in 1946, the "Frank Palumbo Award" was created for the most valuable Philadelphia baseball player, as voted by Philadelphia sports writers. Schoolboy Rowe was selected for the award and Louis Prima was engaged to play. Prima was also scheduled to perform the national anthem at the Philadelphia Phillies game earlier that day to promote the opening. Due to union rules, he was not allowed to play at the game, instead singing and awarding the trophy to Rowe. A banner plane advertised Prima's appearance that evening to great effect. 38,000 people showed up for the opening, 3,000 more than the stadium seated.

== Political influence ==
Palumbo's restaurant and clubs served as an unofficial "political nerve center in Philadelphia." Though he never held elected office, Palumbo had unofficial power with South Philadelphia's Republican ward leaders and allegedly served as the mob's "political fixer".

In the run up to U.S. entry in World War II and with growing numbers of Italian Jews in South Philadelphia's immigrant population, Palumbo organized protests by Italian American associations against growing racial intolerance in Italy.

== Mob tie allegations ==
Palumbo was the subject of regular insinuation and speculation. An Inquirer Magazine article in 1975 suggested that his intense need for privacy and philanthropic zeal may have been used to cover an unexplained secret life of some kind. Unsubstantiated rumors of Mafia connections were common.

Kefauver Committee hearings in 1950 connected Palumbo with mob numbers games, with his nightclub identified as the headquarters for roughly fifty of the city's numbers banks.

=== Frank Sinatra and the fixed fight ===
Frank Sinatra was a long-time friend of Palumbo, frequently performing at his clubs. Palumbo was best man when Sinatra married Ava Gardner.

In 1947, Sinatra turned to him for help with his image when press reports tied Sinatra to the Mafia. Together, they promoted a youth football league to provide an activity for urban children and generate positive press for them both.

Sinatra had been photographed in Cuba with top American mobsters at a mob wake, was widely accused of womanizing, and reportedly had assaulted a reporter. On 14 November 1947, Jake LaMotta threw a boxing match against Billy Fox at the request of the mob. LaMotta's manager, Al Silvani, was Sinatra's former bodyguard and friend. Fox was co-managed by Palumbo and Frank "Blinky" Palermo, a mobster who ran Philadelphia's policy racket.

As Sinatra and Palumbo were both threatened by the resulting investigation, they worked together to generate positive press coverage. Palumbo had been a long time supporter of the Pop Warner Junior Football Conference. Through Palumbo's dealings a "Santa Claus Bowl" was arranged. Philadelphia's "Venango Midgets" were renamed "Frank Palumbo's Clickets". They took on the newly formed, and thus "undefeated", "Frank Sinatra's Cyclones" in a game heavily promoted by the Philadelphia Daily News.

The News cited a fictional nationwide bidding war for coverage with other newspapers, a planned (though likely impossible) appearance by Sinatra, alleged bids to host a planned 1948 bowl and the supposed support of Milton Berle, Al Jolson, Bob Hope, Mickey Rooney and Jimmy Durante. After the game, Palumbo drew the names of two players for trips to the Sugar Bowl, generating three more days of coverage as the News ran articles penned by one of the winners.

=== Angelo Bruno ===
A 1950–1 U.S. Senate investigation into organized crime found that Palumbo's CR Club was the meeting place for some 50 of the Philadelphia mob's numbers game backers. Palermo escaped with a small fine for "impertinent ... sarcastic answers". Palumbo briefly evaded this subpoena before his lawyer Jake Kossmann got him cleared without charges. After the investigation, the Senate's file connecting Palumbo with Palermo disappeared.

In addition to being Palumbo's lawyer, Kossman also worked for mob associate Frank "Blinky" Palermo, crime boss Frank Costello, mob-involved union leader Jimmy Hoffa and Philadelphia mob boss Angelo Bruno. Bruno assassination on 12 March 1980 outside his home in South Philadelphia, took place immediately after dining with Kossmann. Kossmann was also a trustee for the Pop Warner Football League.

A 1962 federal wiretap determined that Bruno's mob used the "secure" phone in Palumbo's for most of their dealings. A 1970s treasury agent who worked undercover in the mob called Palumbo its "political fixer".

== Famous starts helped ==
=== American Bandstand ===
A young Tony Mammarella landed his first job in broadcasting (at WFIL-AM) through Palumbo's connections. It was there that Mammarella met the young Dick Clark, with whom he would soon produce American Bandstand.

=== Joey Bishop ===
Palumbo gave a first break to Joey Bishop, later to team up with Sinatra as part of the Rat Pack.

=== Tom Foglietta ===
Philadelphia City Councilman and later U.S. ambassador to Italy Tom Foglietta was godfather to Palumbo's daughter said,

His friends go down to the restaurant, and if they want to talk, or they need a favor, Frank's there. They might ask his advice on how to go about getting elected. Frank can help them by letting the committeemen and ward leaders know that he thinks a certain candidate is a good one.

== Later years ==
Well beyond the Click Club's heyday, the restaurant remained popular. Sinatra visited the "black tie saloon" frequently and mayor Frank Rizzo spent most evenings there during his rise to power, years in office and beyond.

He died on February 12, 1983, in Merion Station, Pennsylvania.

== Honors ==
Two different parks named "Palumbo Park", at 10th and Fitzwater and at 7th and Catherine Streets in the Bella Vista section of South Philadelphia, are named in Palumbo's honor. The Academy at Palumbo, 1122 Catharine Street, is also named for him.
