= Culture of Philadelphia =

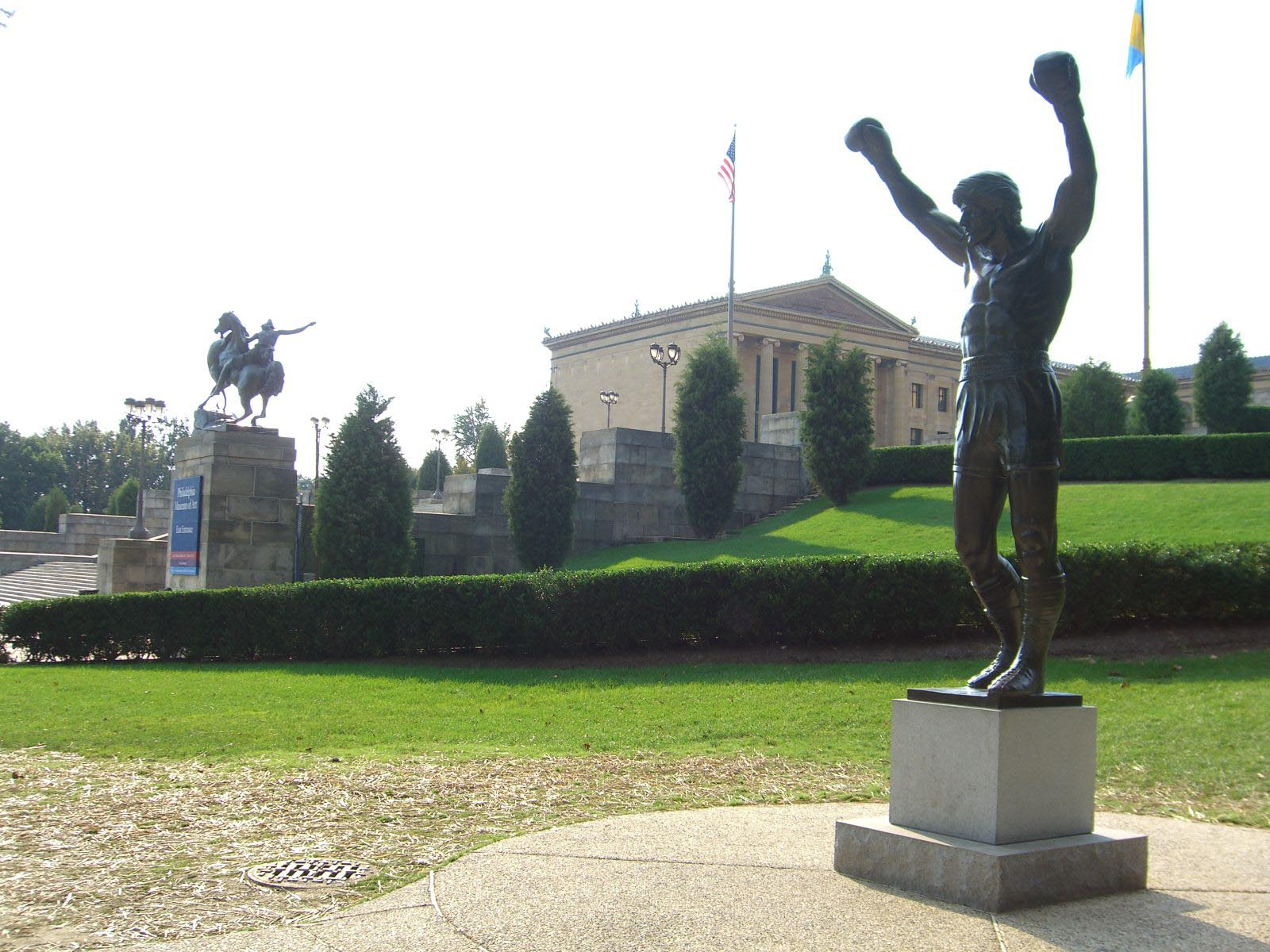
The Rocky statue on the Rocky Steps at the Philadelphia Museum of Art

The culture of Philadelphia goes back to 1682 when Philadelphia was established by William Penn, founder of the colonial-era Province of Pennsylvania. Philadelphia emerged quickly as the largest and most influential city in the Thirteen Colonies.

By the 1750s, Philadelphia was the second-largest city in the British Empire after London, and a center of early American culture, political leadership, intellectual thought, industry and manufacturing. Philadelphia served as the capital of both colonial-era British America and then, until 1800, as the first capital of the United States.

== History ==
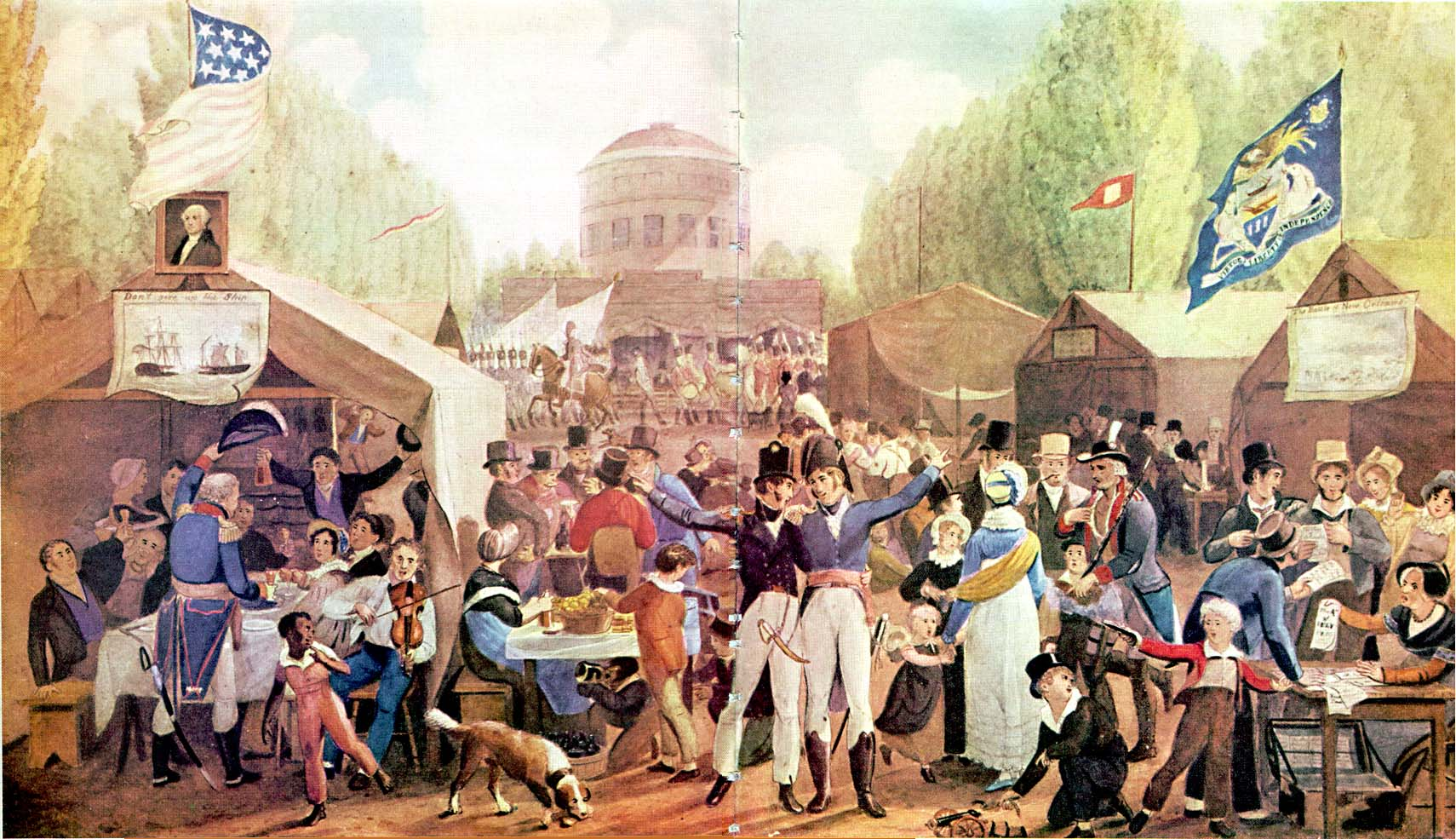
Philadelphians celebrating Independence Day on July 4, 1819

Present-day Philadelphia was formerly inhabited by the Lenape, a Native American tribe. In the 17th and 18th centuries (1600-1799) Philadelphia was known globally for its freedom of religion where people could live without fear of persecution because of their religious beliefs, affiliations or practices. Thousands of Quakers, Mennonites, and other Protestant denominations at odds with the practices of the Church of England and the Roman Catholic Church at the time fled Europe to seek refuge in Philadelphia.

Prior to the American Revolution and following it, Philadelphia grew quickly into a major political and economic center of the United States, serving as the nation's capital until 1800. During the Revolutionary War, the First and Second Continental Congress met at what today is Independence Hall at 4th and Chestnut streets.

In 1776, 56 delegates to the Second Continental Congress, determined to secure independence from British colonial rule, charged the Committee of Five, including John Adams, Benjamin Franklin, Thomas Jefferson, Robert R. Livingston, and Roger Sherman, with authoring a declaration to King George III declaring the Thirteen Colonies free and independent states.

John Adams, a leading proponent for colonial independence, persuaded the Committee of Five to charge Jefferson with writing the document's original draft. Jefferson largely wrote the document in isolation between June 11 and June 28, 1776, from the second floor of a three-story home he was renting at 700 Market Street in Philadelphia. This document became known as the Declaration of Independence. It was unanimously adopted by the Second Continental Congress on July 4, 1776, which both formalized and escalated the Revolutionary War.

The document has become one of the most iconic statements on human rights and human liberties, particularly its second sentence: "We hold these truths to be self-evident, that all men are created equal, that they are endowed by their Creator with certain unalienable Rights, that among these are Life, Liberty and the pursuit of Happiness." Historian Stephen Lucas called the Declaration of Independence "one of the best-known sentences in the English language." Historian Joseph Ellis has written that the document contains "the most potent and consequential words in American history".

Following the Battle of Gettysburg, the bloodiest battle of the American Civil War, President Abraham Lincoln famously referenced the Declaration of Independence in the Gettysburg Address, one of the most famous speeches in American history, saying, "Four score and seven years ago our fathers brought forth on this continent, a new nation, conceived in Liberty, and dedicated to the proposition that all men are created equal."

In the 19th and 20th century, immigration and migration led to large concentrations of Irish, Italians, Germans, Asians, Puerto Ricans and African Americans. Philadelphia continues to be a major destination for immigrants, with large Chinese, Vietnamese, Korean, East African, Middle Eastern, Indian and Mexican immigrant populations, among others.

The city has made contributions in art, music, television, architecture and food. Philadelphia institutions range from the Philadelphia Museum of Art to Pat's Steaks.

== People ==
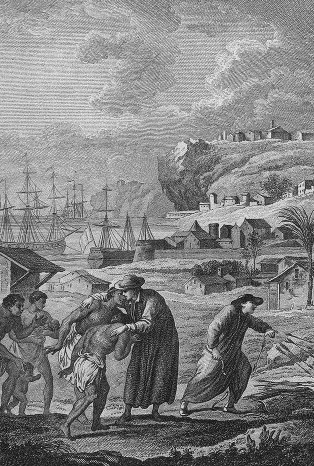
Quakers and the local Lenape depicted in an 18th century sketch

Before the first European settlers arrived in present-day Philadelphia, the region was inhabited by the Lenape, a group of Native American people. The Lenape occasionally fought with the earliest Dutch settlers, but had much better relations with William Penn and the early inhabitants of the English subjects of the colony of Pennsylvania. Still, disease and development pushed the Lenape west.

A member of the Religious Society of Friends who faced religious persecution and was imprisoned in Great Britain for challenging established religious views of the Church of England, Penn envisioned his colony as a place where many groups of people could live together and worship freely. Mennonites, Amish, Moravians, and Pietists moved to the area during the 17th century.

By the mid-18th century, Quakers and the English had become a minority in the colony as other ethnic groups such as the Welsh, Scots, free blacks, Germans, Ulster Scots, Finns, Swedes, Dutch Americans, and Irish moved to the city.

Lutherans established places of worship in the city as early as the 1720s. In 1748, Henry Muhlenberg led the founding of the Lutheran-affiliated Pennsylvania Ministerium.

In 1734, followers of what would become the Schwenkfelder Church arrived in Philadelphia and settled in the region. The first American Presbytery was founded in 1706 in Philadelphia and a year later in September 1707 the Philadelphia Baptist Association was founded, the oldest Baptist association in the United States. The city's first Catholic chapel was built in 1733 and the city's first recorded practicing Jew, Nathan Levy, arrived as early as 1735.

During most of the 19th century, immigrants mainly from Germany, England, and Ireland settled in the city. Some of these immigrants were Catholic, which fueled anti-Catholic feelings and organizations. In the 1840s Philadelphia became a major base for anti-Catholic Protestant groups which soon led to deadly riots in 1844. However, by the end of the 19th century, Roman Catholics had become the largest single denomination in Philadelphia, though all Protestant denominations combined remained a majority of the Christians in Philadelphia into the present day.

During the last decades of the 19th century and the first half of the 20th century, the origin of immigrants shifted from England, Ireland, and Germany to Italy, Southern Europe, Russia, Poland, and Eastern Europe. Italians and Poles helped increase the city's Catholic population, but Jewish immigrants, mainly from Poland, Lithuania, and Russia, were the largest religion to settle in the city during this period. Supplementing the already settled German Jews, the city's Jewish population swelled from 5,000 in 1881 to 100,000 in 1905. Philadelphia's Italian population changed from 300 in 1870 to 77,000 in 1910. Hungarian and Polish immigrants also settled in the city, but in smaller numbers. In the 20th century political power began to shift from primarily white Protestants to Irish and Italian Catholics and Jews, with the city's first Catholic and Jewish mayors elected in 1963 and 1992 respectively.

In the second half of the 19th century, immigration began from Latin America, mainly from Puerto Rico and Cuba. Starting in the 1950s, large numbers of Puerto Ricans settling primarily in North Philadelphia. By the end of the 20th century, Puerto Ricans became the largest Latino group in Philadelphia.

Immigrants from China founded Chinatown in the 1870s and 1880s; over the next century, the neighborhood grew into a diverse community with immigrants from many Asian countries. By the 21st century, Philadelphia's two largest Asian ethnic groups were Chinese and Korean immigrants. Philadelphia became the earliest recorded East Coast city with a Korean community in the 1880s; early members were largely political exiles supporting Philip Jaisohn.

Immigration from the Middle East to Philadelphia began as early as the 1880s with immigrants primarily from Lebanon. Starting in the 1960s immigrants from other Middle Eastern countries, such as Syria, the Palestinian territories and Iraq moved to the city. Other immigrants from Asia during the last decades of the 20th century include Indians, Vietnamese and Cambodians. Another community who established an identity in Philadelphia during the 20th century was the gay community. The city's homosexual community is centered in a portion of Washington Square West, nicknamed the "gayborhood" by residents.

=== African Americans ===
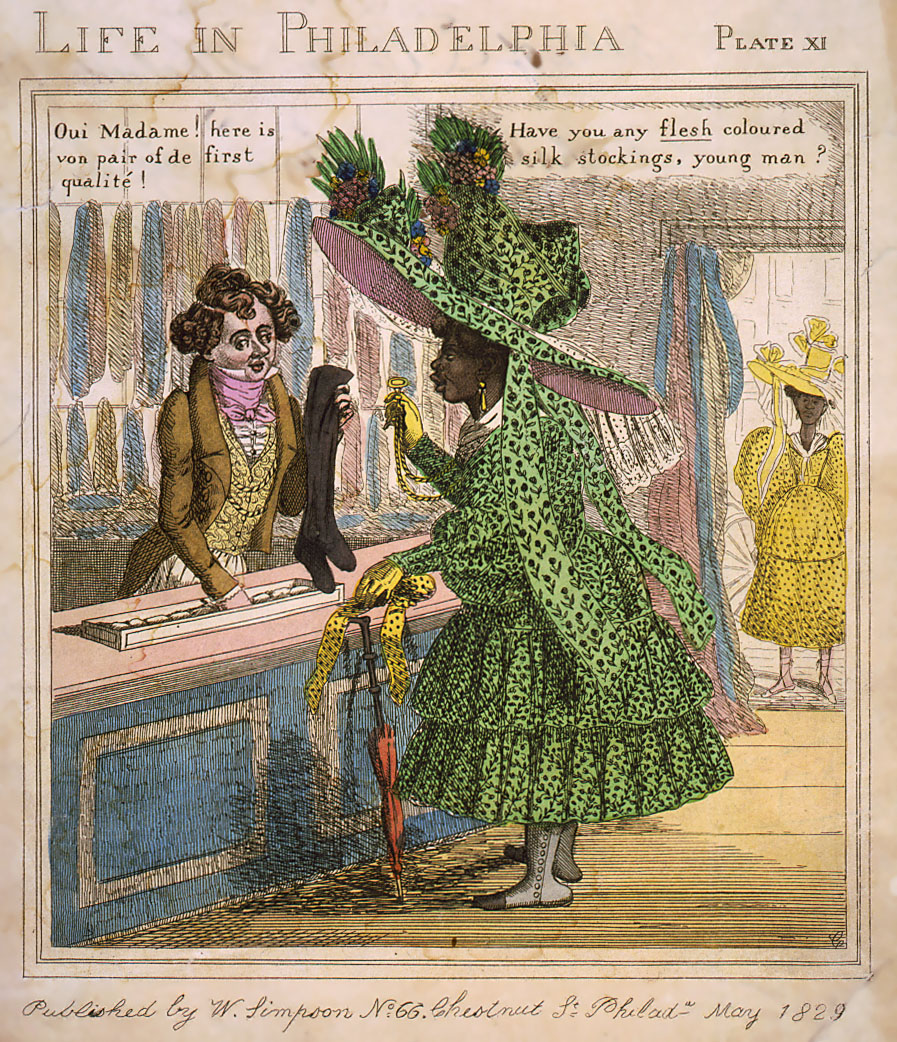
An 1829 cartoon, "Life in Philadelphia," about African American high society in 19th century Philadelphia

The first black people in Philadelphia were slaves; with at most 1,500 people living as slaves in the city during the period slavery was legal. Slaves in Philadelphia usually lived in the same house of their owners and worked as servants or in their owners' shops. An abolition law in 1780 did not free any existing slaves, but banned the slave trade in Pennsylvania and freed the children of slaves born after the law was passed once they reached a certain age. By the time the law was passed, about 400 slaves and 800 free black people lived in Philadelphia. Many newly freed slaves and escaped slaves from the South moved to the city, and by 1820 the city's African American population was nearly eleven percent. During this time one former slave, Richard Allen, founded the African Methodist Episcopal Church in Philadelphia. As the African American population grew, so did white hostility towards them. African Americans were attacked and killed in the street and in their houses during a race riot in 1834, and four years later a state law was passed that prevented African Americans from voting. Abolitionists were also targets; they were prevented from spreading their message, and one of their meeting houses was burned.

In the latter half of the 19th century and the first half of the 20th century large numbers of African Americans migrated from the Southern United States to Philadelphia giving the city the largest African American population of a northern U.S. city. In 1896 W. E. B. Du Bois came to Philadelphia and wrote his sociological book The Philadelphia Negro. Du Bois' study of the city's African Americans found many lived in Center City with growing populations in West Philadelphia. Many African Americans lived in neighborhoods near the rich white families they worked for. There was also a small group of upper class African Americans, both educated, wealthy and Philadelphia born, who descended from freedmen earlier in the century. The aristocratic African Americans were generally isolated, not recognized or even known about by the white population and alienated from the rest of the city's African American population.

As Philadelphia grew more industrialized the new factories refused to hire African Americans, with only about one percent of Philadelphia's African American population finding employment with the factories. In 1899, W. E. B. Du Bois said that ninety percent of the African American population in the city was below the poverty line. White-collar office jobs also refused to hire African Americans and many worked as domestic workers. There were African Americans that did manage to own their own businesses, while other became professionals such as doctors and lawyers. In 1884 Christopher J. Perry founded The Philadelphia Tribune, a newspaper for African Americans.

During World War II, factories began hiring African Americans. The Philadelphia Police Department first hired African Americans in 1881. In the 1950s, the first African American promoted to Police Captain was James N. Reaves. Reaves went on to integrate patrol car crews. During the 1950s and 60s the factories and a large portion of the white population left the city. African Americans became the city's largest ethnic group, with most of North Philadelphia, West Philadelphia, Germantown and portions of South Philadelphia becoming black neighborhoods. Old black working-class neighborhoods became ghettos filled with vacant lots and houses due to loss of industrial jobs. Starting in the 1970s African Americans began to gain significant independent political influence in city government, with the city's first African American mayor, Wilson Goode, being elected in 1984. Starting at the end of the 20th century a new wave of immigrants directly from Africa settled in the city. Coming from over thirty different countries there are an estimated 55,000 African immigrants in Philadelphia.

=== Philadelphia aristocracy ===
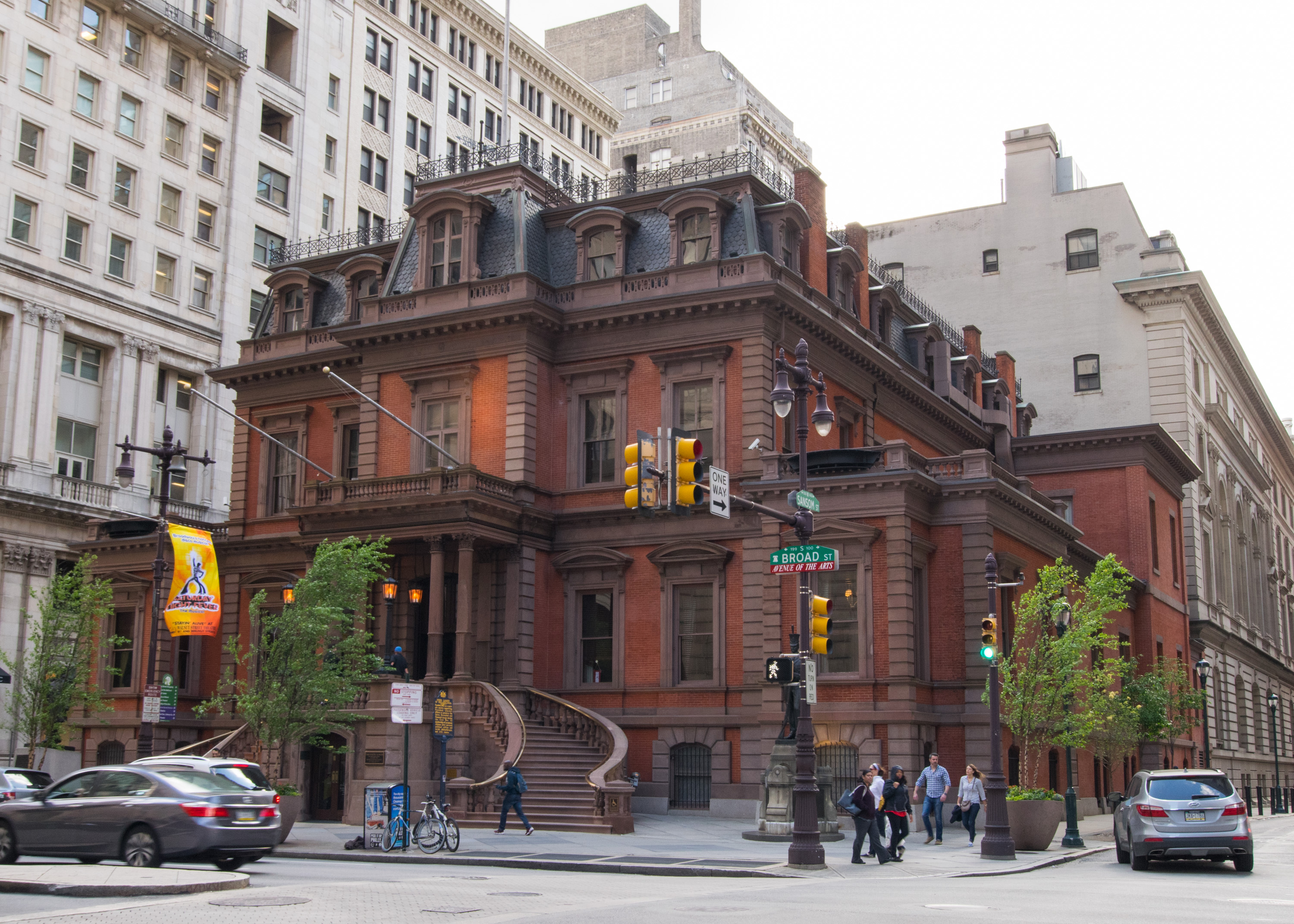
The Union League of Philadelphia on South Broad Street in May 2017

By the second half of the 18th century Philadelphia had developed an upper-class society. Many of the families that made up the upper class could trace their lineage to the earliest Quaker settlers, though many of these had subsequently joined the Church of England or Presbyterian denominations. The Philadelphia upper class was exclusive; what mattered was a person's family, not a person's wealth. Inheritance was better than self-made wealth.

In the late 19th century Mark Twain observed, "In Boston, they ask how much does he know. In New York, how much is he worth. In Philadelphia, who were his parents." A person could not enter Philadelphia society by acquisition of wealth, but their offspring, if they grew up well and married into the right family, could create a new lineage if the family stayed respectable.

In the 18th century, the wealth had been built on shipping, trade, and real estate. Despite the later generations' inheritance they were expected to pursue a career. The acceptable careers in Philadelphia were medicine and law, with insurance, banking, and brokerage next in line on the ladder of acceptability. Running the family business was also acceptable especially if it related to iron and steel making, coal, and the railroads. Beyond their careers, the Philadelphia elite strived to have a seat on a board, particularly as the chairman of the board. Business boards such as the boards for the Pennsylvania Railroad and Philadelphia Savings Fund Society were important, but so were charitable, institutional, cultural and social boards.

The Philadelphia upper class engaged in fox hunting, race horse breeding, attending balls and lavishly entertaining in their townhouses or mansions. The elite also joined exclusive clubs such as the State in Schuylkill, the Philadelphia Club, the Philadelphia Cricket Club, and the Union League. The upper class started with mansions in Old City, but through the 18th and 19th centuries upper class gradually moved west through Center City until the end of the 19th century when much of the upper class moved to large mansions along the Philadelphia Main Line. The Philadelphia aristocracy lasted well into the 20th century but by the end of the century the old rich families were overwhelmed by the new rich. By the late 20th century, membership in the upper class was defined less by ancestry, and organizations such as the Union League began to accept limited numbers of Jews, Catholics, African Americans, and even Indians.

== Art ==
=== Fine art ===
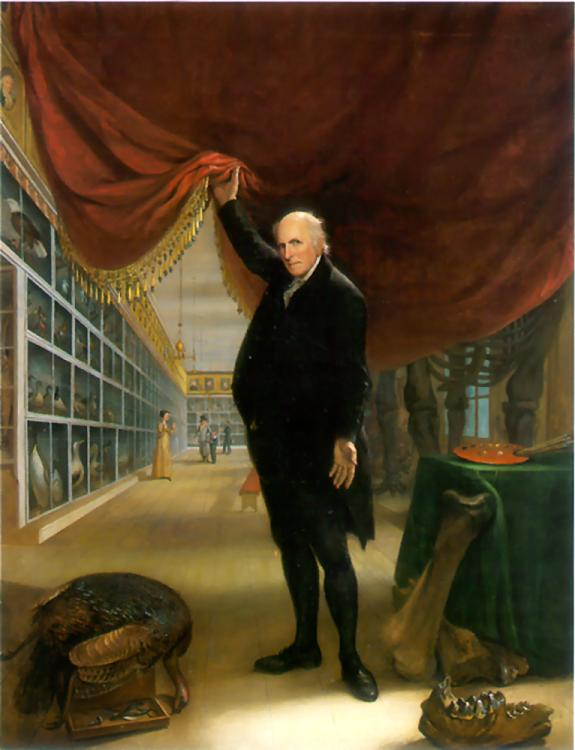
Charles Willson Peale's self-portrait The Artist in His Museum, now housed in the Pennsylvania Academy of the Fine Arts on North Broad Street in Center City

Prior to the American Revolution the upper class increasingly supported the arts, particularly by commissioning portrait paintings. The demand for portraits made Philadelphia attractive to artists and many came to the city, including William Williams who introduced oil painting to another Philadelphia artist, Benjamin West.

In 1805, an art collector, believing Philadelphia the best place for the encouragement of artistic taste, offered the city numerous paintings, sculptures, engravings and other art work. To accept the gift the city formed the Pennsylvania Academy of the Fine Arts. The Academy, the oldest art school and museum in the United States, helped establish many artists. Portraitist Charles Willson Peale and sculptor William Rush helped found the Academy of the Fine Arts and artists such as Thomas Eakins, Henry Ossawa Tanner and some of the members of the Philadelphia Ten studied there.

Notable living artists include Pepon Osorio, Allan Edmunds, and Diane Burko.

The city's major art museum, the Philadelphia Museum of Art was founded in 1876 to maintain the art exhibits from the Centennial Exposition. The museum holds over 225,000 pieces of artwork including work by Vincent van Gogh, Pablo Picasso, and Marcel Duchamp. Not far from the Museum of Art is the Rodin Museum. The museum, founded in 1929, is the largest collection of Auguste Rodin work outside France. Nearby are the Barnes Foundation and Calder Gardens.

In 1923, Albert C. Barnes was outraged that his collection of paintings by Paul Cézanne, Henri Matisse, Pablo Picasso, and Amedeo Modigliani was so poorly received by Philadelphians when put on display at the Academy of the Fine Arts that Barnes removed the collection and housed it in a building in Merion, Pennsylvania where Barnes enjoyed denying access to most Philadelphians. The controversial decision in 2002 to, against Barnes' wishes expressed in his will, move the collection to Philadelphia was based on financial reasons. In 1991, to promote Old City art galleries, the Old City Art Association began First Fridays. On the first Friday of every month, Old City galleries hold a collaborative open house night.

Philadelphia has more public art than any other American city. The inclusion of decorative art in Philadelphia structures goes back to the 19th century. In 1872, the Fairmount Park Art Association was created, the first private association in the United States dedicated to integrating public art and urban planning. The Association is responsible for the art along the Schuylkill River drives. In the late 1950s, the Philadelphia Redevelopment Authority included a clause in its development contracts requiring that at least one percent of construction budget be allocated to fine art. In 1959, lobbying by the Artists Equity Association helped create the Percent for Art ordinance, the first for a U.S. city. The program, which has funded more than 200 pieces of public art, is administered by Creative Philadelphia, the City of Philadelphia's office of arts and culture (the city's art agency). Creative Philadelphia stewards the City's collection of over 1,000 works of public art, located in civic spaces and public facilities, recreation centers and libraries, police and fire stations, and the Philadelphia International Airport. Creative Philadelphia also features work by local artists and cultural organizations inside of Philadelphia City Hall through its robust Art in City Hall program as a means to amplify community voices.

Philadelphia has more murals than any other U.S. city. In 1984, the Department of Recreation created the Mural Arts Program. The program, an extension of the city's Anti-Graffiti Network, is intended to beautify neighborhoods and also provide an outlet for graffiti artists. The Mural Arts Program, which became independent from the Anti-Graffiti Network in 1996, has funded more than 2,300 murals created by professional, staff and volunteer artists. The program also runs art education programs and tours of the murals.

=== Music ===
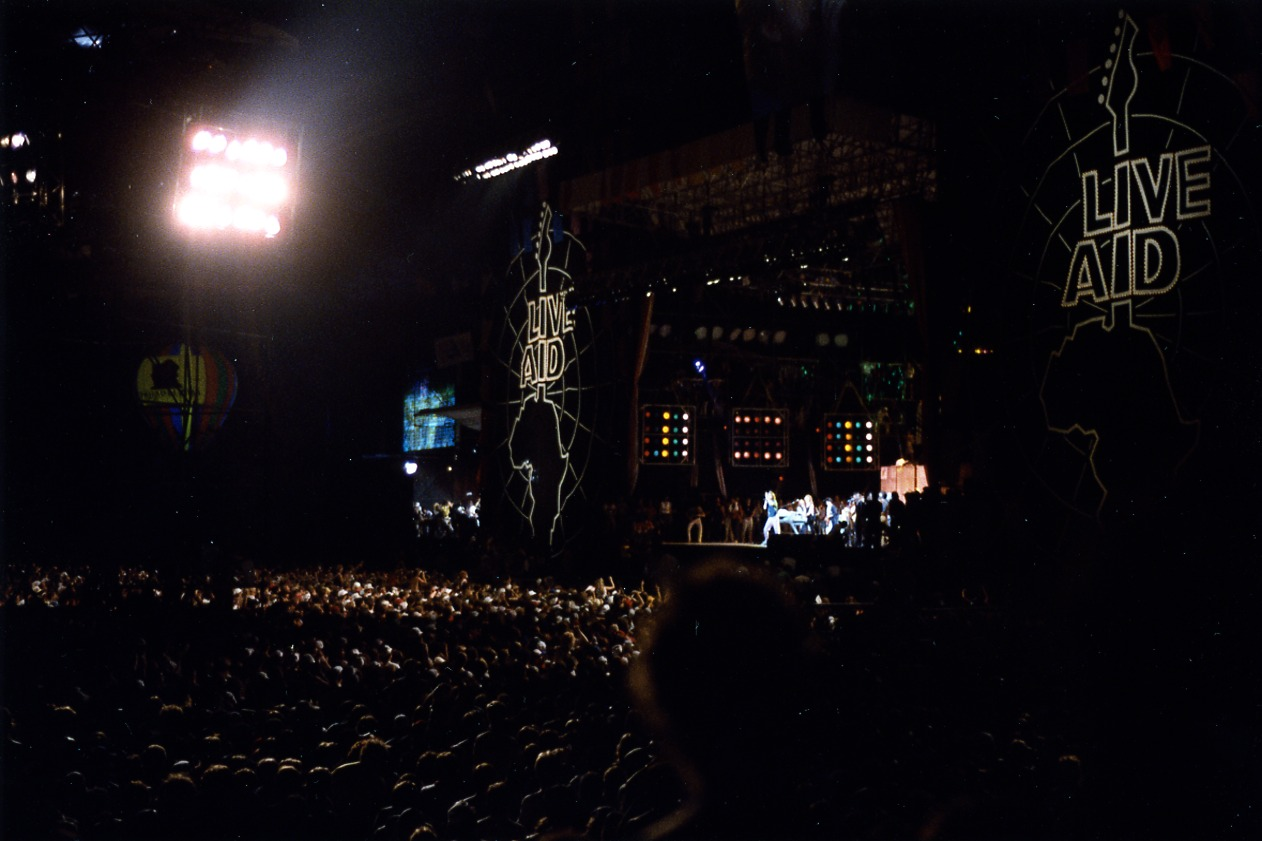
On July 13, 1985, Philadelphia hosted Live Aid, one of the nation's largest rock concerts to date featuring Black Sabbath, Eric Clapton, Bob Dylan, a reunion of the three living members of Led Zeppelin with Phil Collins on drums, Madonna, The Hooters, Tom Petty and the Heartbreakers, Neil Young, and other major musical acts at John F. Kennedy Stadium in a philanthropic concert to address famine in Ethiopia.

Music began to be a major part of city life in the middle of the 18th century. Organs began to appear in non-Quaker churches and the city staged its first opera, The Beggar's Opera. The city's musical scene grew in the 19th century with the music of William Henry Fry, and the founding of the Musical Fund Society which began underwriting concerts in 1820. The Musical Fund Society begat the Academy of Music in 1857, which now hosts the Philly Pops, the Pennsylvania Ballet and the Opera Company of Philadelphia.

Founded in 1900, the Philadelphia Orchestra, once called Philadelphia's "chief contribution to civilization" by Lawrence Gilman of the New York Herald, rose to prominence with conductors Leopold Stokowski and Eugene Ormandy in the middle of the 20th century. The orchestra's home was the Academy of Music until the Kimmel Center for the Performing Arts opened in 2001.

The city developed an early jazz scene with many future best selling artists, including John Coltrane and Charlie Biddle, coming out of Philadelphia. In 1952, WFIL-TV premiered Bandstand which, in a few years, would become American Bandstand hosted by Dick Clark. The national success of the show led to rise of local music labels such as Swan Records, Cameo-Parkway and Chancellor Records. The 1960s saw the development of Philadelphia soul, led by producers Kenny Gamble and Leon Huff. Towards the end of the century Philadelphia artists made contribution to Hip hop music with artists such as DJ Jazzy Jeff, Will Smith, The Roots, Lil Uzi Vert, PnB Rock, Meek Mill, G. Love & Special Sauce, Ot7 Quanny, and Schoolly D. Philadelphia is also a cultural center for rock music, with multiple nationally recognized rock music radio stations, including WMMR, the now-shuttered WYSP, and others. The city is a top tour venue for rock musicians.

More recently, Philadelphia has been home to a number of independent alternative musicians. Dr. Dog, The War on Drugs, Kurt Vile, Nothing (band), Philadelphia Slick, Alex G, Japanese Breakfast, Clap Your Hands Say Yeah, and Beach Slang. It is also home to Diplo and other EDM musicians.

=== Performing arts ===
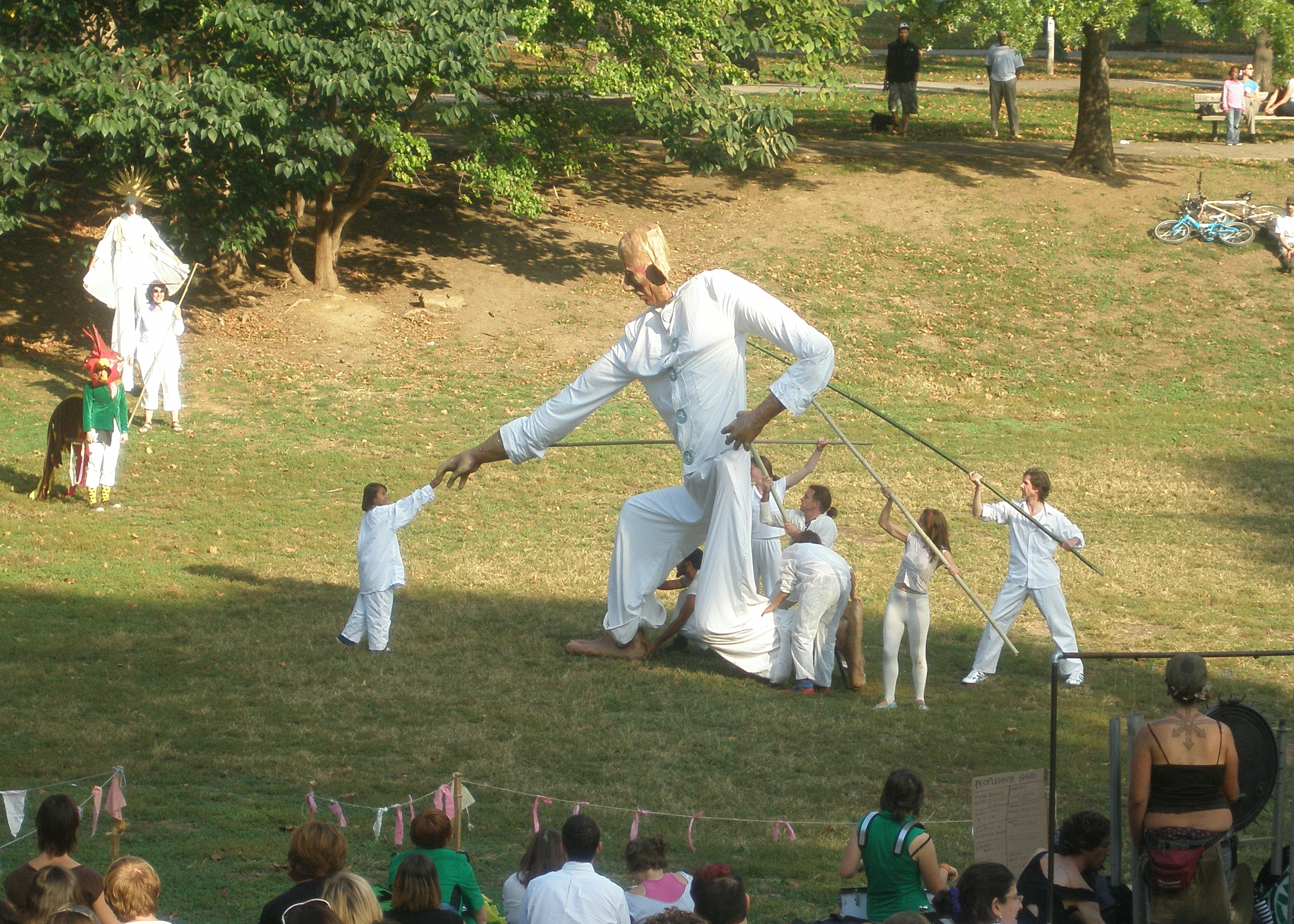
Philadelphia's Spiral Q Puppet Theater performing in West Philadelphia's Clark Park in October 2007

In Philadelphia's early history the city was visited by outside theater troupes, but experienced some resistance from conservatives and Quakers who tried to restrict performances. The creation of the Southwark Theatre in Philadelphia in 1766 marked the permanent presence of theater in Philadelphia. Theatrical performances were banned during the American Revolution, but when the ban was repealed in 1784 theater returned and another theater, the Chestnut Street Theatre, opened a decade later. Over the next century a number of other theaters opened in the city including the Walnut Street Theatre and the Forrest Theater. Philadelphia produced several major theater actors, including Edwin Forrest, John Drew, and several members of the Barrymore family. The Philadelphia Theater Company, founded in 1974 and specializes in new American plays, used to perform in the Plays and Players Theatre but moved into the Suzanne Roberts Theatre on the Avenue of the Arts in 2007.

Pennsylvania's oldest African-American theatre is the New Freedom Theatre, located on North Broad St. Other modern theaters include the Arden Theater Company, the Wilma Theater, Lantern Theater Company, and the University of the Arts' Merriam and Arts Bank theaters. The University of Pennsylvania puts on productions at the Annenberg Center for the Performing Arts, the Irvine Auditorium and the Iron Gate Theater. African American themed plays are put on at the Freedom Theater and the Bushfire Theater. Other theater companies include the Adrienne, the InterAct Theater Company, the Venture Company, the Mum Puppet Theater and the new play development conference PlayPenn. Every year the Philadelphia Shakespeare Festival performs three Shakespeare plays.

There are an estimated 120 theater organizations in the Philadelphia area. The Theatre Alliance of Greater Philadelphia was formed in 1990 form its predecessor, the Performing Arts League of Philadelphia, to promote local theater; since 1994, the organization has presented the annual Barrymore Awards for Excellence in Theater to theater productions in the area.

Dance became a part of Philadelphia with the beginning of the Philadelphia Dancing Assemblies in 1748 which remained popular into the 20th Century. Major dancing organizations include the Pennsylvania Ballet founded in 1963. The Pennsylvania Ballet performs in the Academy of Music and the Merriam Theater. The Philadelphia Dance Company (Phildanco) was founded in 1970 and specializes in modern dance. The Koresh Dance Company was formed in 1991 and performs choreography that mixes elements of ballet, jazz, modern dance, and other dance forms.

=== Film and television ===
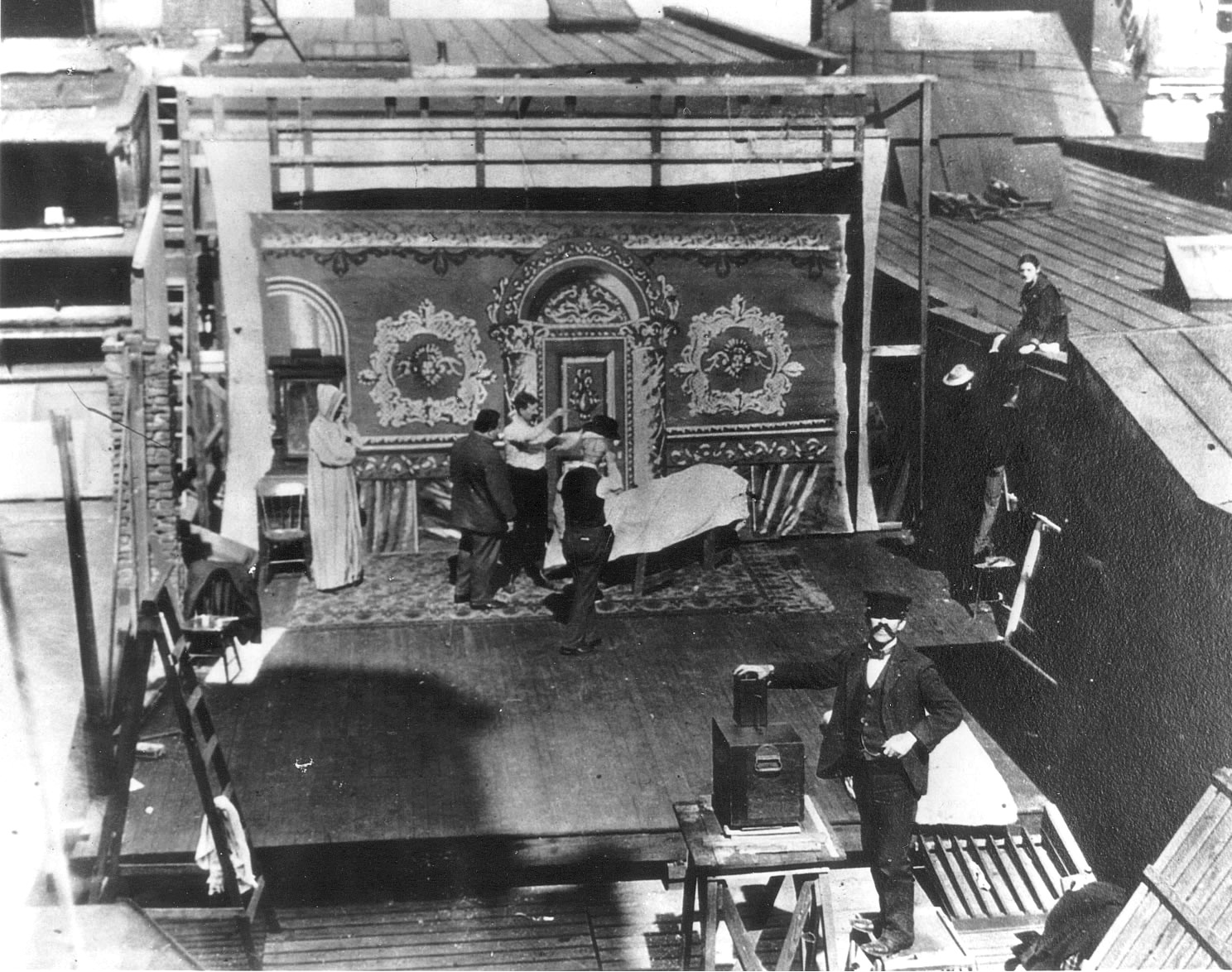
A Lubin Studios movie set in Philadelphia in 1899

On December 18, 1895 Charles Francis Jenkins showed off his film projector at the Franklin Institute. It was the first demonstration of moving pictures using flexible film in Philadelphia. A week later Woodville Latham's eidoloscope was shown to Philadelphia audiences. German immigrant and optician, Siegmund Lubin, was impressed with the technology and bought Jenkins' camera.

In Philadelphia, he filmed his first film, his horse eating hay. Lubin continued to make films in Philadelphia, now showing them commercially, and built his own cameras and projectors which he marketed. In 1902, he eventually created a production company, Lubin Manufacturing Company, and later opened up some of the city's first movie theaters.

In 1905, Jules Mastbaum opened the city's first Nickelodeon movie theater. Lubin Studios shut down in 1917 and through most of the 20th Century Philadelphia had an almost non-existent film industry.

In 1985, the Greater Philadelphia Film Office was created as part of the city government. In 1992, it became a regional economic office.

Since 1992, the GPFO, which promotes the Philadelphia region and helps coordinate film productions, has assisted in the making of over 200 films and television shows. Between 1992 and 2002 film productions have brought in US$500 Million to the city's economy.

In 2007, MovieMaker Magazine named Philadelphia the second-best city in the nation in which to make a movie, citing local talent, cost of living, and the assistance provided by the Philadelphia Film Office. Several months after the MovieMaker Magazine article, Pacifica Ventures announced that it will be opening a film studio in the Philadelphia area in 2008.

Philadelphia annually hosts the Philadelphia Film Festival, Philadelphia QFest, and the Philadelphia Asian American Film Festival.

== Cuisine ==
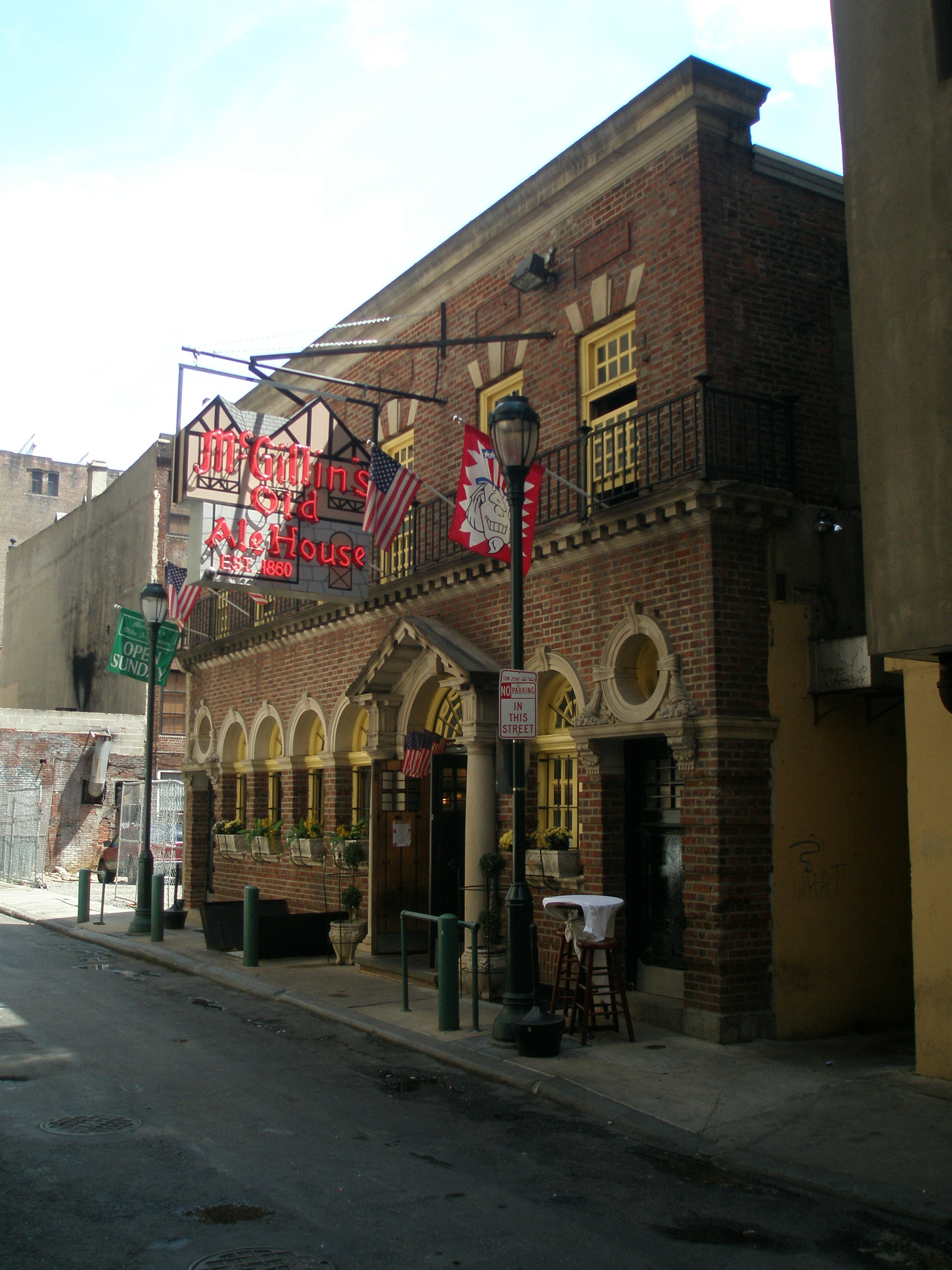
McGillin's Olde Ale House, founded in 1860, is Philadelphia's oldest drinking establishment

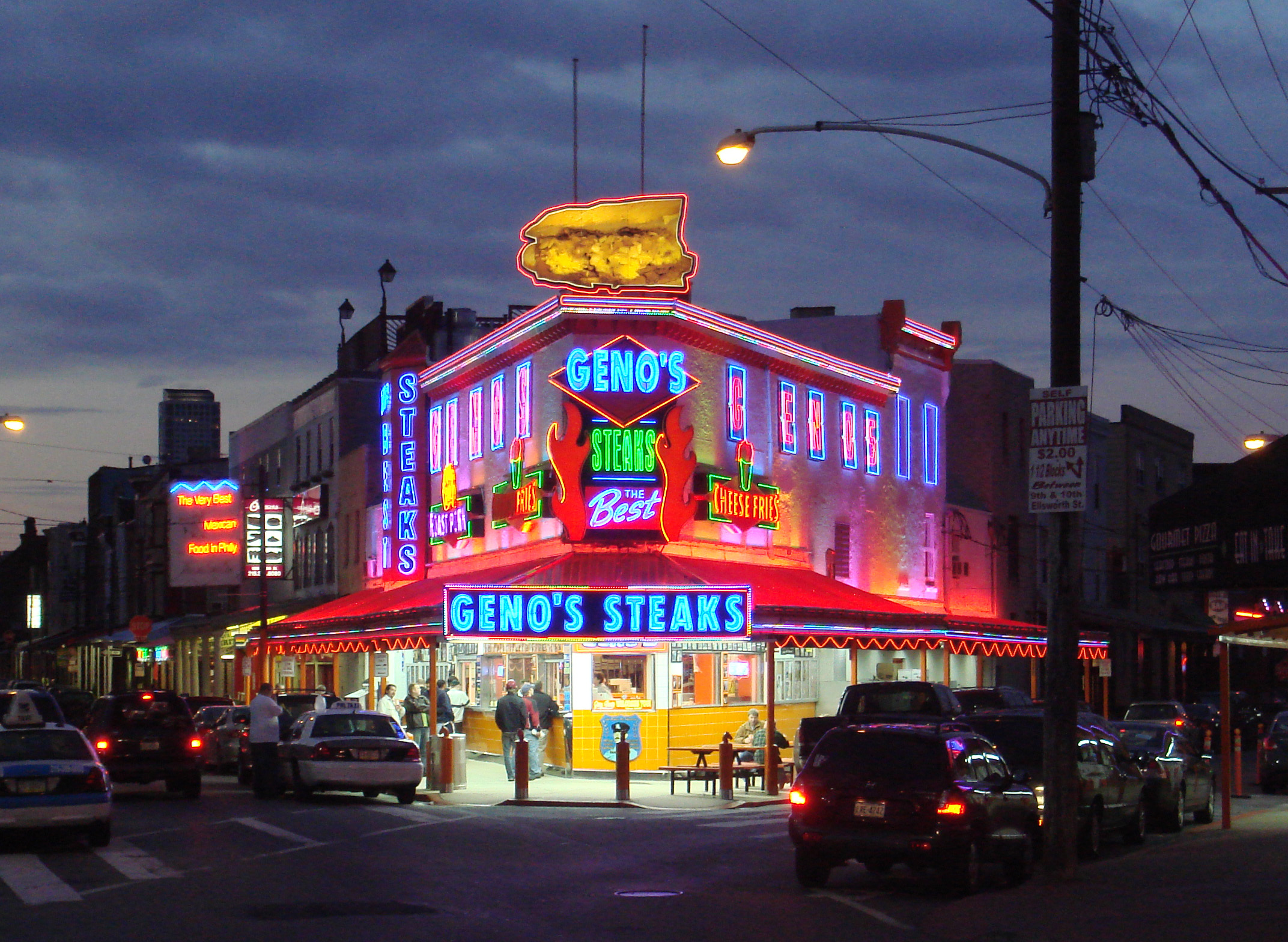
Geno's Steaks in 2007

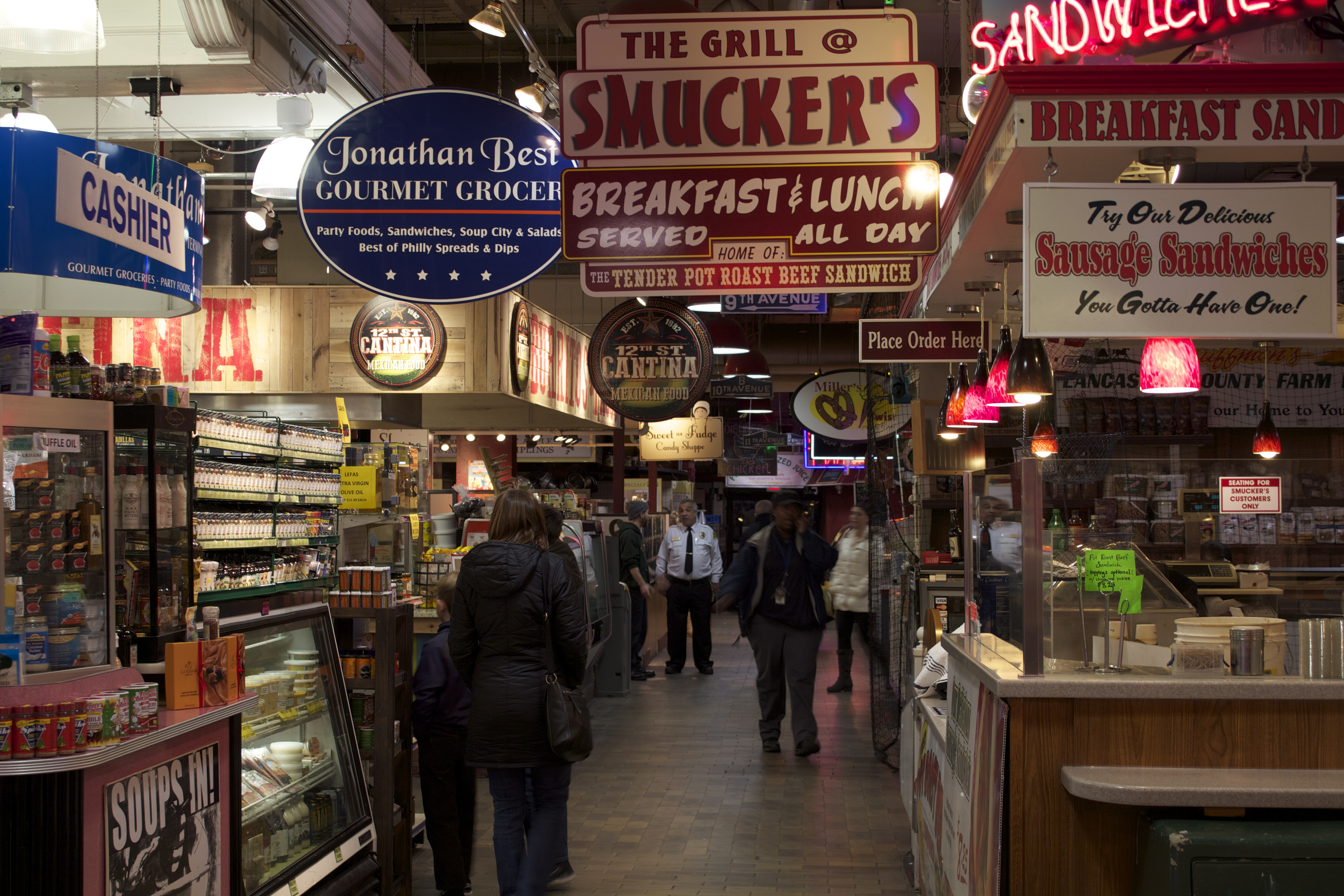
Reading Terminal Market in 2014

Philadelphia is the home of many culinary institutions, both gourmet and local staples. The city's immigrant history has resulted in the development and proliferation of multiple cuisines. The most well-known food from Philadelphia is the cheesesteak, created in the 1930s. There is a long-running feud between two cheesesteak rivals: Pat's Steaks, which invented the cheesesteak, and Geno's Steaks. However, most Philadelphians regard this debate as a tourist trap, instead opting for local cheesesteak joints. Italian ice (often referred to exclusively as "water ice" in the Philadelphia area) and soft pretzels were not invented in Philadelphia, but because of their popularity and availability have become Philadelphia staples. Philadelphia cream cheese is also well-regarded, along with other Pennsylvania Dutch foodstuffs like Scrapple. Irish potato candy is a popular Philadelphia confection that is especially popular around St. Patrick's Day. Submarine sandwiches, called hoagies, are also famous. The city has a well-known fine dining scene as well, home to restaurateurs like Steven Starr and Michael Solomonov.

During the 18th century, city taverns, including the London Coffee House and Tun Tavern, the birthplace of the United States Marine Corps in 1775, were regular meeting places for the political and business leaders. Another tavern frequented by politicians is McGillin's Olde Ale House, which is the oldest continuously operated tavern in the city.

In the late 19th century, two Philadelphia landmarks, the Reading Terminal Market and Italian Market, were created, selling all types of food and other commodities.

The early 20th century saw the creation of the first automat in the United States on Chestnut Street and the founding of the Tasty Baking Company. For most of the 20th century fine dining could only be found in private clubs or dinner parties, but with the beginning of the city's revival in the 1970s a restaurant renaissance began. Starting with Le Bec-Fin in 1970, many upscale restaurants have sprung up in the popular neighborhoods. Philadelphia has since added over 150 upscale establishments, famously including the several trendy restaurants of Stephen Starr as well as dozens of sidewalk cafes and trendy bars. Such a renaissance has led to an acclamation of Philadelphia as a world-class "food city".

Philadelphia's large Chinese, Vietnamese, and East African populations have made their marks on Philadelphia's dining scene. Philly Chinatown is home to first-class Chinese, Vietnamese, Thai, and Malaysian foods. South Philadelphia has many Vietnamese and Chinese restaurants, and West Philly is home to multiple East African restaurants, including four Ethiopian restaurants. Philadelphia also has numerous Indian and Middle-Eastern restaurants in Center City and West Philly.

== Grassroots culture ==
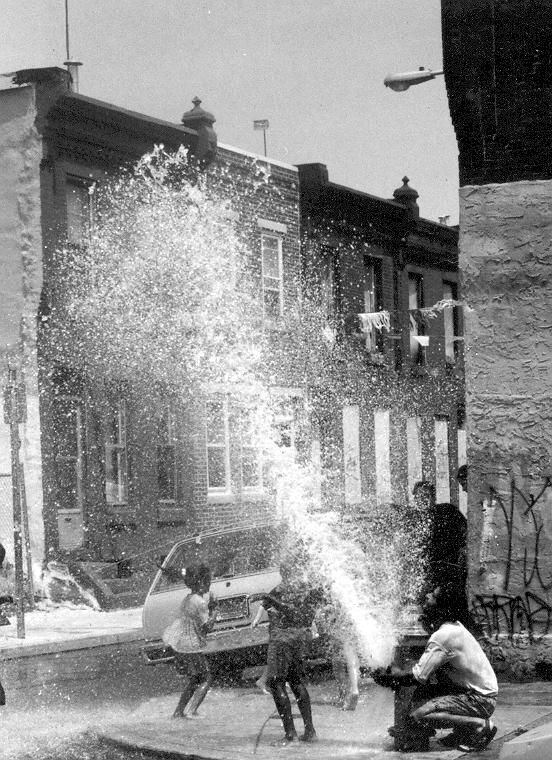
Cooling off with a fire hydrant in Philadelphia in July 1996

While not all residents regularly dine out or attend the theater, many Philadelphians participate in local community activities and organizations. Block parties and yard sales are common on weekends. Philadelphia has vibrant local markets, such as the biweekly market in Clark Park at 43rd and Baltimore, where local farmers sell produce and artists and antique collectors show their wares. Philadelphia is also home to food cooperatives such as West Philly's Mariposa.

Philadelphia has a long history of graffiti culture. The Philadelphia Anti-Graffiti Network, which gave way to the Mural Arts Project, has reduced the incidence of graffiti, but South Street is full of graffiti, and writers still perform their craft, legally and illegally, on walls throughout the city.

Philadelphia has thriving non-profits in all areas of community service. Books Through Bars, which collects books to distribute at prisons, started in Philadelphia. Philadelphia is home to one of the largest National Network for Abortion Funds (NNAF) and the Women's Medical Fund. Philly Fellows, started in 2005, have been focusing efforts on "building capacity in the non-profit sector." Philadelphia also has important faith-based organizations.

== Annual fairs and events ==
Philadelphia holds many annual festivals and events. One of the most famous is the annual Mummers Parade, held every New Year's Day since 1901. The Saint Patrick's Day Parade, which is popular with the city's large Irish population, is the second oldest parade in the United States.

The Puerto Rican Day Parade has been held in the city for over 50 years.

Since 1993, every summer around the July 4th holiday, the multi-day Welcome America event celebrates Philadelphia as the birthplace of the United States.

Three major annual shows in Philadelphia are the Philadelphia Flower Show in March, the Philadelphia Auto Show in February and antiques-focused The Philadelphia Show in April. Major events include the Greek Picnic, a reunion and celebration of African American college fraternities and sororities. Another event, the Wing Bowl is an eating contest started in 1993. Festivals include the Philadelphia Folk Festival and Unity Day an event celebrating unity between people and families. PrideFest events promote LGBT rights. In September, the month-long Philadelphia Fringe Festival highlights experimental art, performances and exhibits throughout the city.

== In popular culture ==
Philadelphia is featured prominently in film, literature, music, and television, including:

=== Films ===
Some films based in Philadelphia, or about the city, include:

- 2012: Silver Linings Playbook
- 2006: Invincible, Mark Wahlberg stars in the real-life story of Vince Papale, a Philadelphia bartender who overcomes great odds to become an NFL player with the city's beloved Philadelphia Eagles.
- 2006: 10th & Wolf, a true story about the Philadelphia crime family mob war
- 2006: Kabhi Alvida Naa Kehna, a romantic drama including scenes at 30th Street Station and Delancey Street in Philadelphia
- 2004: National Treasure, an action-adventure filmed in Philadelphia about the search for a Freemason treasure that includes a secret map on the back of the U.S. Declaration of Independence
- 2000 to present: Unbreakable (2000), the first of the Unbreakable film series, including Split (2016) and Glass (2019)
- 1999: The Sixth Sense, a psychological thriller based in Philadelphia starring Bruce Willis
- 1995: 12 Monkeys, a science fiction thriller based in Philadelphia starring Bruce Willis and Brad Pitt
- 1993: Philadelphia, a legal drama starring Tom Hanks and Denzel Washington about HIV/AIDS discrimination in a large Philadelphia law firm
- 1976 to present: The Rocky franchise, including Rocky (1976), Rocky II (1979), Rocky III (1982), Rocky IV (1985), Rocky V (1990), Rocky Balboa (2006), Creed (2015), Creed II (2018), and Creed III (2023)
- 1940: Kitty Foyle, a New York City saleswoman, played by Ginger Rogers, has flashbacks to her youth in Philadelphia as she faces a difficult personal decision.
- 1940: The Philadelphia Story, a romantic comedy starring Cary Grant, Katharine Hepburn, and James Stewart, based on the real-life story of Helen Hope Montgomery Scott, called "the unofficial queen of Philadelphia's WASP oligarchy" by Vanity Fair magazine

=== Literature ===
Some novels set in Philadelphia include:

- 2019: Such a Fun Age by Kiley Reid
- 2001: The Corrections by Jonathan Franzen
- 1845: The Quaker City, or The Monks of Monk Hall by George Lippard

=== Music ===
Some songs about Philadelphia, or that reference Philadelphia, include:

- 2012: "Dreams and Nightmares (Intro)" by Meek Mill
- 1999: "You Got Me" by The Roots
- 1993: "Philadelphia" by Neil Young
- 1993: "Streets of Philadelphia" by Bruce Springsteen
- 1991: "Summertime" by DJ Jazzy Jeff & the Fresh Prince
- 1991: "Motownphilly" by Boyz II Men
- 1990: "The Fresh Prince of Bel-Air theme song" by Will Smith
- 1988: "Punk Rock Girl" by The Dead Milkmen
- 1982: "Atlantic City" by Bruce Springsteen
- 1979: "Ain't No Stoppin' Us Now" by McFadden & Whitehead
- 1976: "Rock'n Me" by Steve Miller Band
- 1976: "Gonna Fly Now" by Bill Conti
- 1975: "Philadelphia Freedom" by Elton John
- 1974: "TSOP (The Sound of Philadelphia)" by Gamble and Huff
- 1970: "(Can't Get to Heaven on the) Frankford El" by The American Dream
- 1964: "Dancing in the Street" by Marvin Gaye
- 1963: "South Street" by Dave Appell and Kal Mann
- 1958: "Sweet Little Sixteen" by Chuck Berry

Some albums about Philadelphia, or referencing Philadelphia, include:

- 2003: Philadelphia Freeway by Freeway
- 2000: Sailing to Philadelphia by Mark Knopfler
- 1994: Freedom of '76, an album by Ween

=== Television ===
Some television shows about Philadelphia, or based in Philadelphia, include:

- 2021 to present: Abbott Elementary
- 2005 to present: It's Always Sunny in Philadelphia
- 2003 to 2010: Cold Case
- 2006 to 2007: The Class
- 2002 to 2004: Hack
- 1993 to 2000: Boy Meets World
- 1987 to 1991: Thirtysomething
- 1956 to 1963: American Bandstand

== See also ==
- Buildings and architecture of Philadelphia
- List of people from Philadelphia
- List of tourist attractions in Philadelphia
- Media in Philadelphia
- Religion in Philadelphia
