= PM Magazine =

Syndicated television show, 1978 – 1991

- Also known as: Evening Magazine (Group W–owned stations, KING-TV and WWOR); Hour Magazine (related program in national syndication)
- Genre: Infotainment
- Presented by: Various
- Country of origin: United States
- Original language: English

Production
- Running time: 30 minutes
- Production company: Group W Productions

Original release
- Network: Syndication
- Release: September 1978 – August 30, 1991

PM/Evening Magazine is a television series with a news and entertainment format. It was syndicated to stations throughout the United States. In most areas, Evening/PM Magazine was broadcast from the late 1970s into the late 1980s.

== Origins ==
During the summer of 1976, KPIX in San Francisco, California, a CBS affiliate then owned by Westinghouse (Group W) Broadcasting, premiered a local weeknight television news and entertainment series titled Evening: The MTWTF Show. The show was designed to add localism as suggested by the newly enacted "Prime Time Access Rule." At its inception, the rule was created by the Federal Communications Commission (FCC) to give back the half-hour preceding primetime (7:30 p.m. to 8:00 p.m. in the Eastern and Pacific time zones; 6:30 p.m. to 7:00 p.m. in the Central and Mountain time zones) to local network-affiliated stations in the top fifty television markets, prohibiting them from accepting network-originated programming (and later on, syndicated reruns of network programs) in that time slot.

=== KPIX's Evening Magazine ===
KPIX's Evening Magazine was first hosted by San Francisco radio personality Jan Yanehiro, journalist Steve Fox and Detroit news anchor and reporter Erik Smith. According to the tenth-anniversary special, Smith lasted 13 weeks before heading back to Detroit and returning to WXYZ-TV, where he remained until 2010. It was the first of a new breed of television show shot totally on videotape, rather than the then-standard 16mm film, taking advantage of new minicam technology. The format called for the local hosts to have on-location wraparounds (in and around their local communities) and introduce short feature stories about ordinary and interesting people doing extraordinary and quite newsworthy things.

=== Expansion ===
At the time, Westinghouse owned four other stations around the country, and with the success of Evening Magazine in the San Francisco market, it was expanded to their other properties. Soon, Group W stations in Baltimore (WJZ-TV), Boston (WBZ-TV), Philadelphia (KYW-TV), and Pittsburgh (KDKA-TV) were all doing their own local versions of the Evening format. The show's format allowed the stations to share their feature stories among each other. For example, a feature that aired in San Francisco could also be shown in Baltimore, and vice versa. The success of the format on the Group W stations gave the company management a bigger idea. Group W decided to expand and syndicate the format to other markets where they didn't own stations. The shows in non-Group W markets would generally use the name "PM Magazine."

At the end of the 1970s, with Evening and PM now all over the country, Group W Productions created a large production office in San Francisco at 855 Battery Street. This was on the bottom floor of KPIX-TV. Dick Crew was the National Executive Producer, with the following production staff: Dick Newton, Sally Jewett, Andrew Schorr, Melanie Chilek, Bill Geddie, Diane Heditsian, John Norton, Larry Emsweller, Vanita Cillo, Jim Ziegler, David Baxter, Mellen O'Keefe, Gary Cooper and Joe Tobin. Their function was to watch all of the stories being produced by the new local PM and Evening Magazine stations and create a weekly "national reel" for stations to run in local markets. Depending on local station budgets they could produce as much or as little feature material as they wanted, but still have a local show starring local talent. The cooperative production model created by Evening/PM remains unique to this day.

=== Breeding ground for television on-air and production talent ===
Evening/PM was also a "breeding ground" for television on-air and production talent. Matt Lauer, Tom Bergeron, Nancy Glass, Leeza Gibbons, Henry Tenenbaum and Jerry Penacoli were among those who became well-known because of their work with the PM/Evening programs. In Pittsburgh, KDKA-TV's broadcast of Evening Magazine featured a young Dennis Miller providing a "humorous" closing piece, similar to Andy Rooney's commentary on 60 Minutes. Over the course of its run, PM/Evening Magazine had numerous co-host male/female pairs around the country, including a number of African-American female co-hosts. Among the male co-hosts, Calvin Sneed at WATE-TV, Knoxville, Tennessee was the first African-American male co-host, a title he held for several years. In its more than a decade run, the show's local market producers traveled all over the country and the world, producing fun and memorable television. PM Magazine was a launching point for the career of actor-meteorologist Mike Randall, who co-hosted the Hartford version from 1982 to 1983, and Miami Dolphins wide receiver Jimmy Cefalo began his broadcasting career with the local edition on WTVJ.

=== Departments ===
Two long features were augmented each day by a block of "departments", featuring special tips for daily living—generally, two or three departments were featured in each program, each with a different host. In the early 1980s, "Captain Carrot" (Cary Nosler) presented the "Self" department, on healthier living; Judi Sheppard Missett presented "Jazzercise" in the "Exercise" department; Dr. James Wasco presented medical issues in the "Health" department; Chef Tell gave new "very simple, very easy" food ideas in the "Cooking" department; the "Animal" department featured Joan Embery and animals from the San Diego Zoo; Fred McBurney hosted "Outdoor Leisure", featuring tips related to hunting & fishing; and in the "Travel" department, Linda Harris visited various parts of the globe.

=== Special editions ===
Occasionally, PM Magazine would feature a prime-time "Special Edition" special, focusing on a single subject for an entire hour. These specials were hosted not by local hosts, but by better-known personalities, such as Bill Rafferty, who hosted a 1980 special edition on "Mating and Dating in the '80s"; and a 1982 "Star-Studded Super Special" hosted by Robert Guillaume.

== Decline ==
The number of stations carrying PM Magazine began to decline in the middle to late 1980s for a variety of reasons.

Some industry insiders have placed a great deal of the blame on Group W Television, which handled distribution of the franchise as well as national advertising sales for the local editions. The initial arrangements between Westinghouse and stations which subscribed to the PM Magazine format were done so on a "barter" basis, where the local affiliate and the national distributor shared an even split of advertising time and revenue. But by the mid-1980s Group W increased the program's franchise fees, and also took more advertising time within the program, thereby reducing the local affiliates' ability to make money with local spots, some by as much as 20 percent. With fewer local commercial spots to sell, and increasing production costs on the affiliate end, the PM Magazine format appeared less attractive.

By 1990, when Group W decided to cancel the format, Evening/PM had been edged out in many of its local time slots in favor of tabloid TV news–investigation programs, many with little or no local content. Shows such as A Current Affair, Hard Copy, and Inside Edition, along with the lighter-edged Entertainment Tonight, filled up the prime-time access available spots and ended Evening/PM's run, although KPIX would resurrect its own version of Evening Magazine once again, this time in the mid-1990s. During this run, one of the hosts was Mike Rowe. KPIX continued to air its version of Evening Magazine weeknights before CBS's prime time programs up until 2005, when the show's name was changed to Eye on the Bay, and the program's hosts also changed after a short transition.

== Legacy ==
The KWQC version of PM Magazine was replaced by a similar show called Paula Sands Live (known to locals by its abbreviation of PSL), which ran on the station from the 1980s until Sands' retirement in 2024, first at 4:00, and then moving to 3:00 following the cancellation of the Oprah Winfrey Show in 2011. It was subsequently replaced by Quad Cities Live, which also has a similar format.

KFTA has a similar program known as Later, with Jason Suel that airs every Saturday at 9:30 following the Fox 24 News at 9. Unlike PM Magazine, a musical guest can be heard every week on the program.

Mike Rowe, who would go on to Discovery Channel, hosted KPIX's revived version of Evening Magazine for a time.

== Stations that carried Evening/PM Magazine ==
Notes: This is an incomplete list. Information on local hosts of this program may be found within the individual stations' articles. Stations marked with an asterisk were owned by Group W.

- Albany: WTEN-TV
- Albuquerque: KOB-TV, KGGM-TV
- Amarillo, Texas: KFDA-TV
- Anchorage: KTBY
- Asheville, North Carolina: WLOS
- Atlanta: WAGA-TV
- Austin: KTBC-TV
- Baton Rouge: WBRZ-TV
- Baltimore: WJZ-TV*
- Beaumont, Texas: KFDM
- Birmingham: WBRC-TV
- Boston: WBZ-TV*
- Buffalo: WIVB-TV, WGRZ-TV
- Cedar Rapids/Waterloo, Iowa: KWWL-TV
- Champaign/Urbana/Springfield, Illinois: WCIA
- Charleston-Huntington, West Virginia: WSAZ-TV
- Charleston, South Carolina: WCBD-TV
- Charlotte: WBTV
- Chattanooga: WRCB-TV
- Chicago: WFLD
- Cincinnati: WKRC-TV, WIII-TV (final season; now WSTR-TV)
- Cleveland: WJW-TV
- Colorado Springs, Colorado: KXRM-TV
- Columbia, South Carolina: WIS-TV
- Columbia/Jefferson City, Missouri: KCBJ-TV
- Columbus, Ohio: WCMH-TV
- Corpus Christi, TX:KIII-TV
- Dallas/Fort Worth: WFAA-TV, KDFW-TV
- Davenport, Iowa: WOC-TV/KWQC-TV
- Dayton, Ohio: WDTN
- Denver: KOA-TV/KCNC-TV
- Des Moines: WHO-TV
- Detroit: WJBK (as "PM Magazine Detroit" and "PM Detroit")
- El Paso, Texas: KVIA-TV
- Evansville, Indiana: WEHT-TV
- Flint/Saginaw/Bay City, Michigan: WNEM-TV
- Fort Myers/Naples, Florida: WINK-TV
- Fort Wayne, Indiana: WANE-TV
- Grand Rapids/Kalamazoo/Battle Creek: WZZM-TV
- Green Bay, Wisconsin: WFRV-TV
- Greensboro/High Point/Winston-Salem: WFMY-TV
- Greenville/Spartanburg/Asheville: WFBC-TV/WYFF, WLOS
- Harrisburg/Lancaster/York/Lebanon: WGAL-TV
- Hartford/New Haven: WFSB
- Houston: KHOU, KHTV
- Huntington, West Virginia: WSAZ
- Indianapolis: WTHR, WISH-TV
- Jackson, Mississippi: WJTV
- Jacksonville: WJXT
- Johnstown, Pennsylvania: WJAC-TV
- Kansas City: KMBC-TV
- Knoxville: WATE-TV (as Knoxville's PM Magazine)
- Lafayette, Louisiana: KLFY-TV
- Lansing, Michigan: WJIM-TV
- Las Vegas: KLAS-TV
- Lexington, Kentucky: WKYT-TV
- Los Angeles: KTTV (CBS station KNXT aired a similar program called "2 On The Town")
- Louisville: WHAS-TV
- Lubbock, Texas: KCBD
- Madison, Wisconsin: WMTV
- Memphis: WHBQ-TV
- Miami/Fort Lauderdale: WTVJ
- Milwaukee: WISN-TV, WVTV during its last season
- Minneapolis/St. Paul: WCCO-TV
- Mobile/Pensacola: WALA-TV
- Mount Vernon, IL: WCEE-TV
- Nashville: WKRN-TV
- New Bern, North Carolina: WCTI-TV
- New Orleans: WWL-TV
- New York City: WNEW-TV/WNYW (PM Magazine), WWOR-TV (Evening Magazine)
- Norfolk/Portsmouth/Newport News: WTKR
- Oklahoma City: KTVY/KFOR-TV
- Omaha: WOWT
- Orlando/Daytona Beach: WDBO-TV/WCPX-TV
- Peoria: WMBD-TV
- Philadelphia: KYW-TV*
- Phoenix: KTVK
- Pittsburgh: KDKA-TV*
- Portland, Oregon: KGW-TV ()
- Providence/New Bedford: WJAR-TV
- Raleigh/Durham/Fayetteville: WRAL-TV
- Reno, Nevada: KTVN-TV
- Richmond, Virginia: WXEX-TV
- Roanoke/Lynchburg, Virginia: WDBJ
- Rochester, New York: WOKR
- Sacramento/Stockton: KXTV, KOVR, KCRA-TV ()
- Saint Louis: KTVI
- Salt Lake City: KUTV
- San Antonio: KSAT-TV
- San Diego: KFMB-TV
- San Francisco: KPIX*
- Scranton/Wilkes-Barre: WNEP-TV
- Seattle/Tacoma: KIRO-TV (PM Magazine), KING-TV (Evening Magazine); KING-TV version still on-air today
- Shreveport, Louisiana: KSLA-TV
- Spokane, Washington: KHQ-TV
- St. Louis, Missouri: KTVI-TV
- Syracuse, New York: WTVH, WIXT
- Tampa/Saint Petersburg: WTOG-TV, WTSP
- Toledo, Ohio: WTOL-TV, WDHO-TV
- Traverse City/Cadillac/Sault Ste. Marie, Michigan: WGTU-WGTQ
- Tucson: KOLD ()
- Tulsa: KOTV
- Utica, New York WKTV
- Waco, Texas KWTX-TV
- Washington, D.C.: WTTG, WDVM-TV/WUSA
- West Palm Beach/Ft. Pierce: WPEC-TV
- Wichita, Kansas: KAKE-TV
- Wichita Falls, Texas: KAUZ-TV
- Youngstown, Ohio: WKBN-TV

== See also ==
- Chronicle, a similar magazine format pioneered by WBZ's direct competitor in Boston, WCVB-TV and which continues to air on that station and WMUR-TV today.
- Living, a similar lifestyle show format with a mixture of local and syndicated segments; aired by CBC Television in Canada from 2007–2009.
- Better, a similar show produced by Meredith's television stations, slanted towards women.
- Evening Magazine
