= Giordano Dance Chicago =

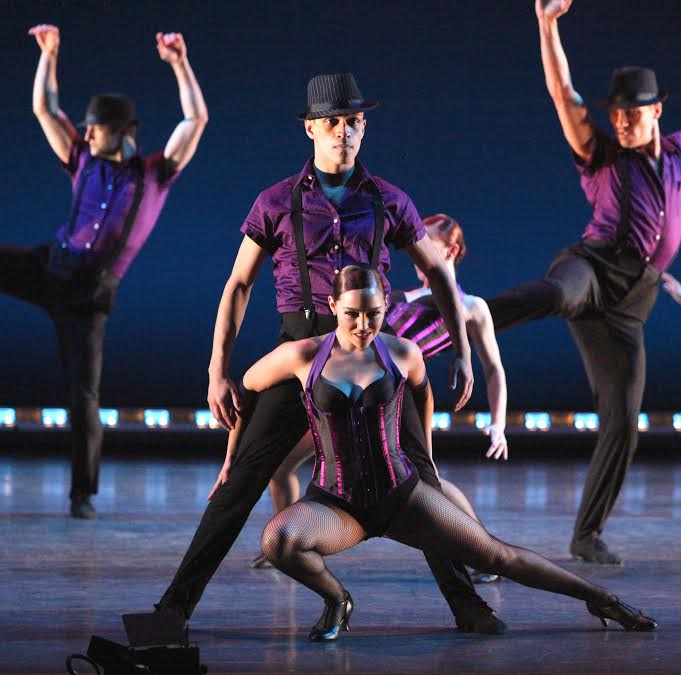
Giordano Dance Chicago performing Feelin' Good Sweet in 2014

Giordano Dance Chicago, formerly Giordano Jazz Dance Chicago and Gus Giordano's Jazz Dance Chicago, is a jazz dance company based in Chicago, Illinois. Founded by Gus Giordano in 1963 as Dance Incorporated Chicago, it has toured worldwide, including as the first jazz dance company in the Soviet Union in 1974. The company has received widespread critical acclaim, and is said to have been the first jazz dance company.

The company comprises ten dancers as well as an apprentice company, Giordano II. Its repertoire includes Giordano's works as well as pieces by Mia Michaels, Peter Chu, Ray Leeper, Roni Koresh, and Rennie Harris. Gus's daughter, Nan Giordano is Artistic Director, and Michael McStraw is Executive Director.

== History ==
Broadway performer Gus Giordano founded the company as Dance Incorporated Chicago in 1963. After giving a performance for the visiting Bolshoi Ballet, the company was invited to tour the Soviet Union in 1974. The company has since performed around Europe, the Americas, Turkey, and Japan.

Giordano founded the Jazz Dance World Congress, a biennial five-day festival attracting teachers and students from around the world, in 1990. As the host company of the Congress, Giordano Dance Chicago performed at Chukyo University in Japan, the John F. Kennedy Center for the Performing Arts in Washington, D.C., and in Wiesbaden, Germany.

After Gus Giordano died in 2008, his daughter Nan, who had been Artistic Director since the 1980s, took full leadership. In 2010, Michael McStraw was named Executive Director.

== Current activity ==
The company performs in Chicago and around the world. It continues to preserve and perform Gus Giordano's oeuvre while commissioning new repertory.

GDC runs several outreach programs, including a program integrating jazz dance into the health and science curricula of local middle schools, and “Jazz Dance Beat…Then and Now”, a concert and question-and-answer session designed to introduce audiences to jazz dance.

== Style ==
The Giordano technique is characterized by "jazz hands" (held with fingers spread and charged with energy), isolated movements of particular body parts, an active pelvis, and precise, unconventional shoulder placement. Powerful jumps, turns, and traveling steps are prized.

Giordano technique uses plié (bending of the legs) prominently, a characteristic Giordano linked to African cultures' connection to the Earth. Giordano arm and torso positions—usually open and slightly "scooped"—are designed to require the dancer's energy and mental presence. Giordano movements are executed with "counterforce", an isometric resistance to the primary motion which creates an aesthetic of power and vitality, in contrast to other jazz dance styles' emphasis on elegance or finesse.
