= Gus Giordano =

American jazz dancer, teacher and choreographer (1923 – 2008)

Gus Giordano (July 10, 1923 – March 9, 2008) was an American jazz dancer, choreographer, and dance educator. He performed on Broadway, in theatre, and on television. He founded the Gus Giordano Dance School in 1953 and Gus Giordano Jazz Dance Chicago in 1963. In 1990, he established the First American Jazz Dance World Congress, and in 1975 he authored Anthology of American Jazz Dance.

== Personal life ==
Giordano was born in St. Louis, Missouri, in 1923. At the age of five, he visited New Orleans, where his cousin taught him the Charleston step. After returning to St. Louis, he studied with local dance teacher Minette Buchman and later took classes in ballet and modern dance. He trained in New York City during summers with Hanya Holm, Katherine Dunham, Peter Gennaro, and Alwin Nikolais. He was later hired at the Roxy Theatre in New York, performing four shows daily.

During World War II, Giordano served in the United States Marine Corps, training as a bomber pilot and performing at the Hollywood Canteen. After the war, he completed a Bachelor of Arts degree at the University of Missouri, where he met his future wife, Peg Thoelke. They married on October 14, 1950. Peg Giordano died in 1993, and Gus Giordano died on March 9, 2008, of pneumonia at the age of 84. They had four children.

== Career ==
After accepting a position at The Film Council of America in Evanston, Giordano began teaching dance in 1953, founding the Gus Giordano Dance School the same year. Notable employees include Judi Sheppard Missett, who developed Jazzercise while teaching classes at the school. He also produced televised dance programming on Chicago's WTTW Channel 11. In the mid-1970s, he wrote Anthology of American Jazz Dance, and in 1992, he published Jazz Dance Class: Beginning Thru Advanced.

In 1963, he founded Gus Giordano Jazz Dance Chicago, which was renamed in 2009 by his daughter, Nan Giordano. The company has performed at venues including the Harris Theater in Chicago. He also established the American Jazz Dance World Congress in 1990, with events later held in Wiesbaden, Germany (1997), Nagoya, Japan (1995), and Monterrey, Mexico (2001).

His theater choreography included productions such as A Christmas Carol at the Goodman Theatre for over 15 years, the Northwestern University The Waa-Mu Show for more than 25 years, and Hair.

== Tribute ==
In 2009, Giordano's daughter Amy produced Gus: An American Icon, a documentary including interviews with colleagues and former students, narrated by Colleen Zenk. The film received awards at the Canada International Film Festival and the 2010 Burbank International Film Festival.

Giordano's work has been credited by scholars with helping to establish theatrical jazz dance as a recognized performance style.

== Awards ==
- 1980 – The Rehearsal won an Emmy, a PBS award, and the Ohio State award.
- 1985 – April 25 declared Gus Giordano Day in Illinois by Governor James R. Thompson.
- 1989 – October 13 declared Gus Giordano Day in Chicago by Mayor Richard M. Daley.
- 1991 – "Circle of Dance Award" from Dance Teacher Now magazine.
- 1991 – Katherine Dunham Award for contributions to the arts.
- 1993 – Ruth Page Lifetime Service to the Field Award, shared with Peg Giordano.
- 1996 – Scholar-in-Residence Award from the University of Missouri.
- 2005 – Heritage Award from the National Dance Association and Chicago Senior Citizen of the Year Award from Mayor Daley.
