= Religion in Philadelphia =

Religion in Philadelphia (2014)
1. Protestantism (41.0%)
2. Roman Catholicism (26.0%)
3. Jehovah's Witnesses (1.00%)
4. No religion (24.0%)
5. Judaism (3.00%)
6. Islam (1.00%)
7. Buddhism (1.00%)
8. Hinduism (1.00%)
9. Other religion (1.00%)
10. No response given/Unknown (1.00%)

Philadelphia has a number of centers of worship for a multitude of faiths. According to the Pew Research Center, the most practiced religion is Christianity with 68%, (41% Protestant and 26% Catholic) followed by Irreligion with 24%, Judaism with 3%, and other religions with 5%.

The most predominant, Christianity, has been seen in the city since its foundation. However many new religions have arrived, including Islam and Hinduism. With immigration from the Middle East, the Horn of Africa, Pakistan, Bangladesh, and India, these two religions have increased their presence. The largest concentrations of Muslims and Hindus live in the Northeast and North parts of the city, Center City, West Philadelphia, and sprawling into the nearby suburbs.

== Christianity in Philadelphia ==
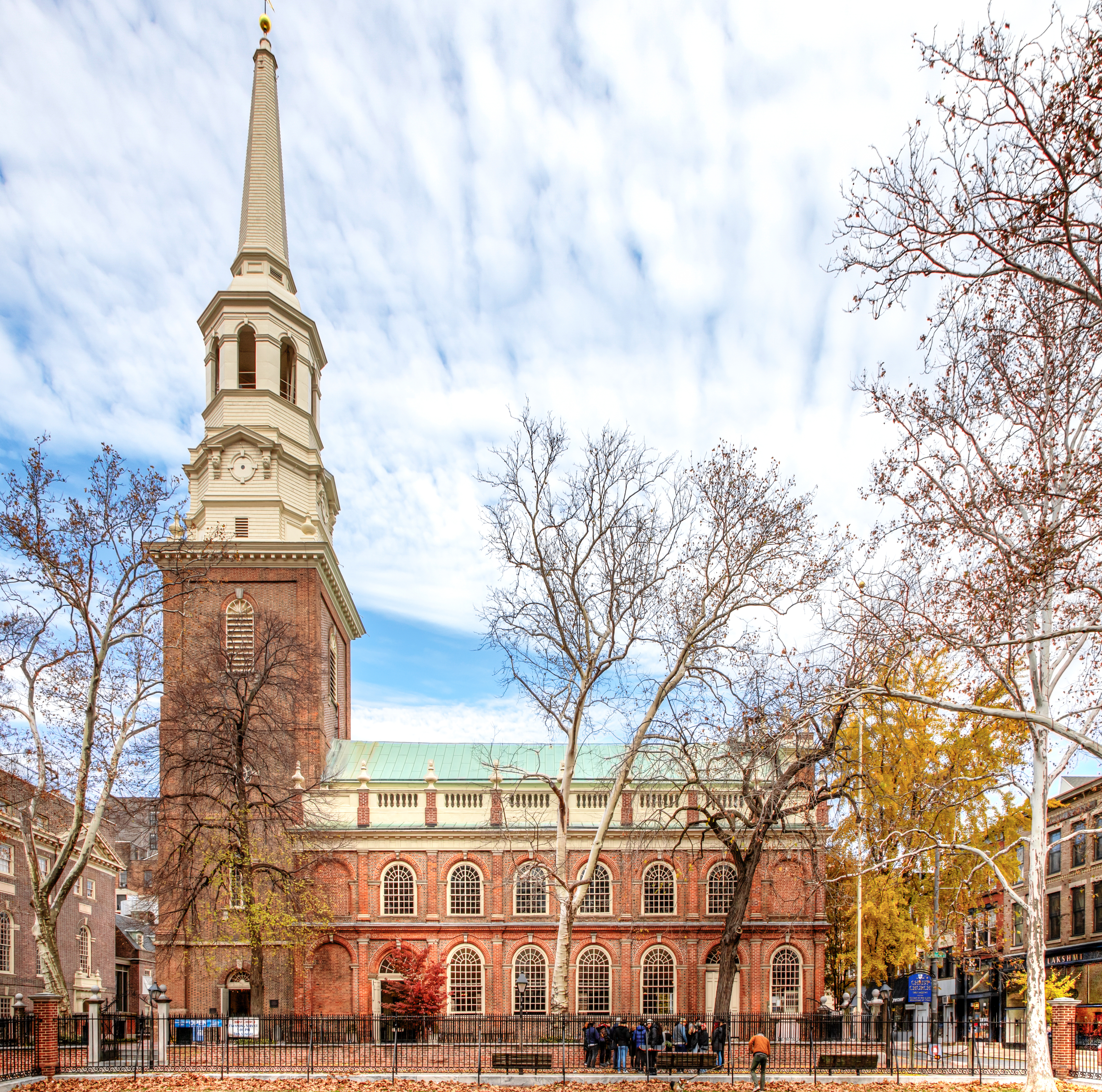
Christ Church is a Georgian style Christian church opened in 1722.

Christianity is the dominant religion in the city of Philadelphia. According to a 2014 study by the Pew Research Center, as high as 68% of the population of the city identified themselves as Christians. These findings were not official however.

There are over 65 Christian churches in the Philadelphia area.

== Judaism in Philadelphia ==
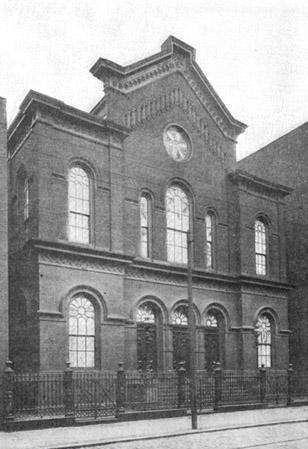
Mikveh Israel Synagogue, Philadelphia

Metropolitan Philadelphia's Jewish population, the sixth-largest in the United States, was estimated at 206,000 in 2001 and almost 300,000 in 2009. (though this number includes many unaffiliated Jews).

Jewish traders were operating in southeastern Pennsylvania long before William Penn. Furthermore, Jews in Philadelphia took a prominent part in the War of Independence. Although the majority of the early Jewish residents were of Portuguese or Spanish descent, some among them had emigrated from Germany and Poland. About the beginning of the 19th century, a number of Jews from the latter countries, finding the services of the Congregation Mickvé Israel unfamiliar to them, resolved to form a new congregation which would use the ritual to which they had been accustomed.

== Islam in Philadelphia ==
With immigration from the Middle East, the Horn of Africa, West Africa, Pakistan, Bangladesh, and India, Islam has seen a huge growth in Philadelphia. The largest concentrations of Muslims live in the Northeast and North parts of the city, Center City, West Philadelphia, and sprawling into the nearby suburbs. Also the Muslim African American community in Philadelphia has grown exponentially over the last decade, and is often seen as a cultural hub for African American Muslims across the country. According to several statistics, Philadelphia has surpassed Detroit and New York City to become the American metropolitan area with the highest proportion of Muslims.

== Other religions ==
Religions with less numerous adherents can also be found. There are significant pockets of Buddhists in Center City, Chinatown, Northeast Philly, and other neighborhoods with significant Asian American populations. There are Caribbean and African traditional religions in North and West Philadelphia. These numbers are also growing. Historically the city has strong connections to The Religious Society of Friends, Unitarian Universalism, and Ethical Culture, all of which continue to be represented in the city. The Friends General Conference is based in Philadelphia. African diasporic religions are popular in Hispanic and Caribbean communities in North and West Philadelphia.

== Gallery ==
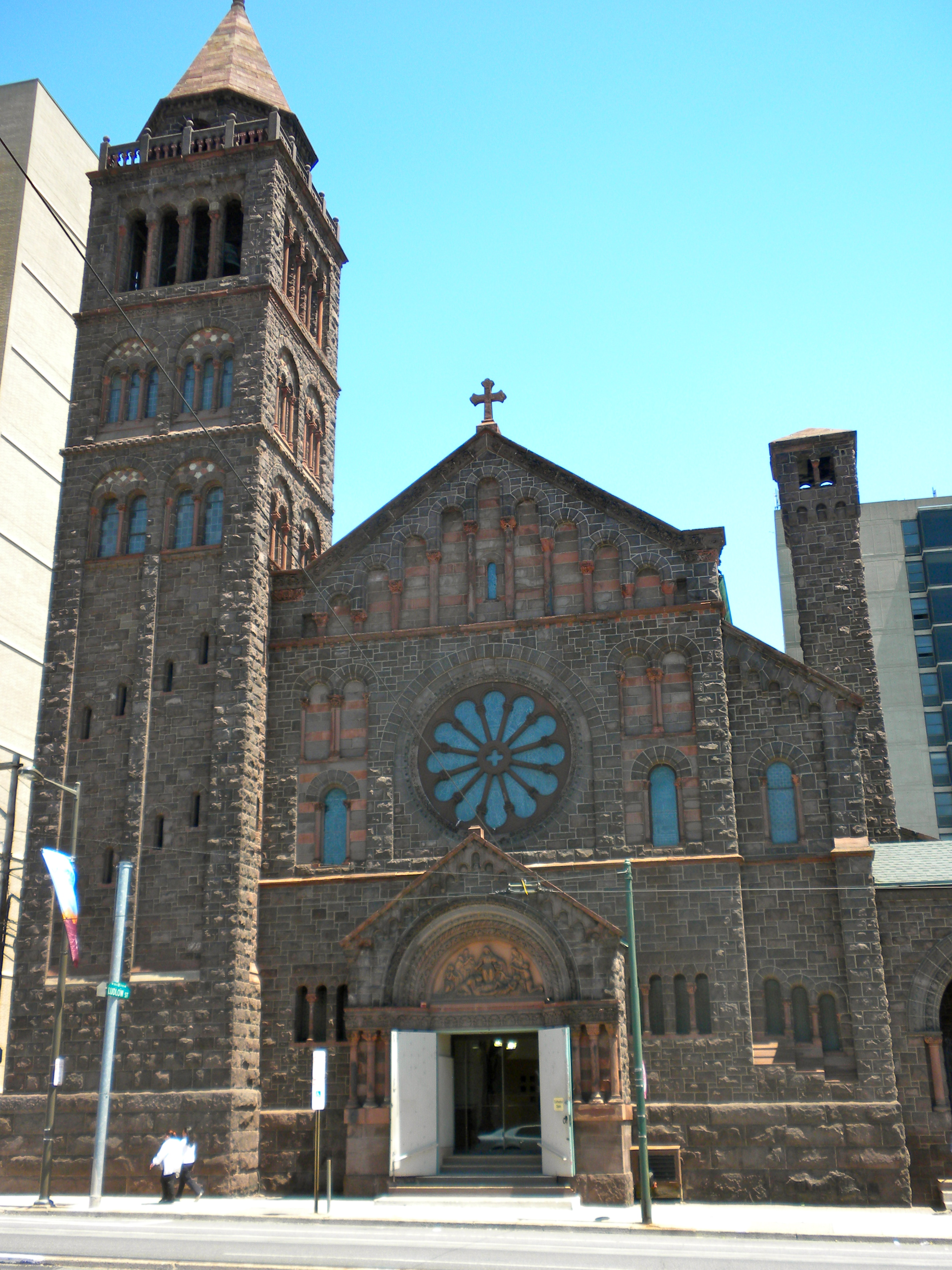
Philadelphia Episcopal Cathedral at 19 South 38th Street

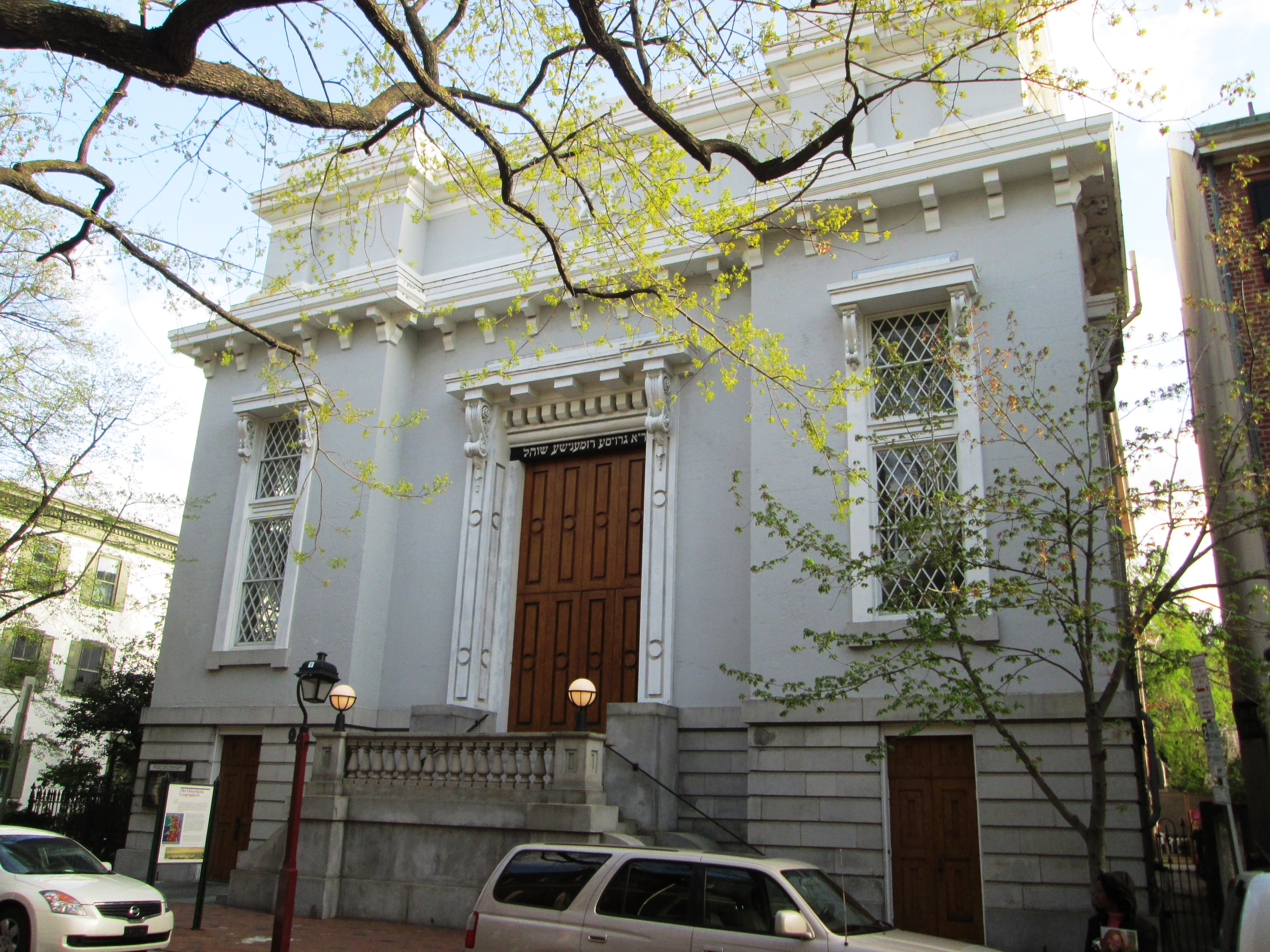
Society Hill Synagogue

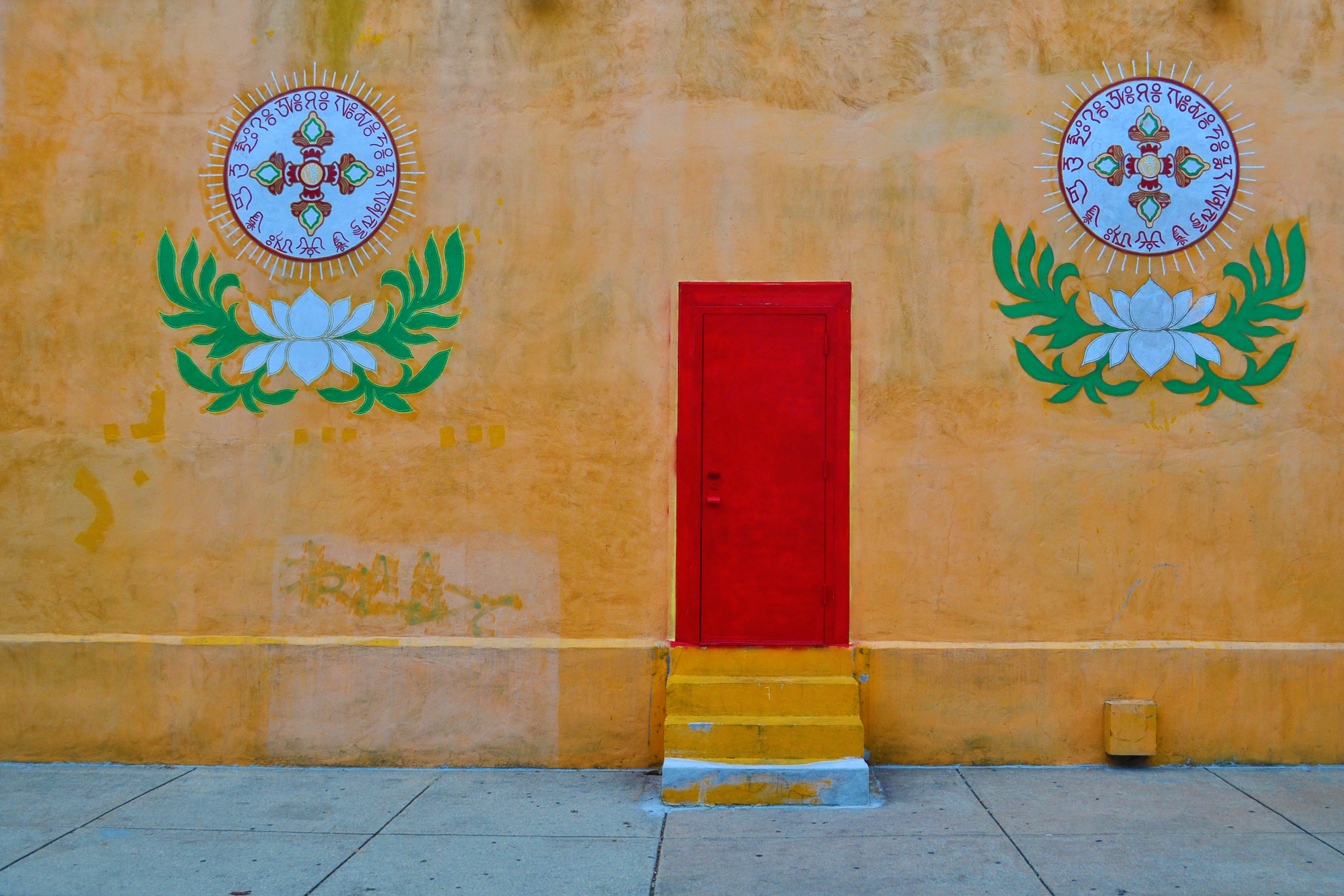
Lian Sheng True Buddhist temple

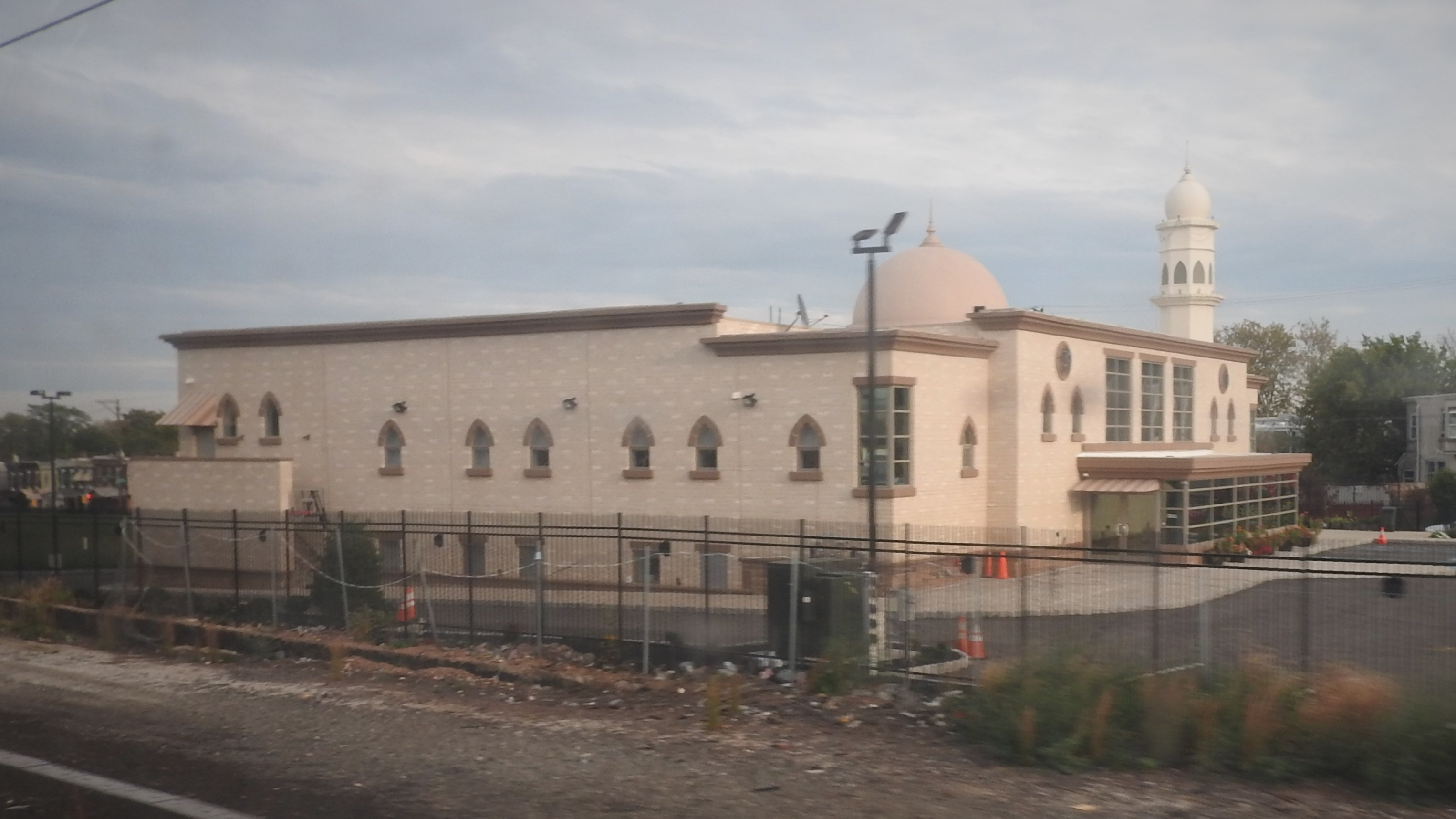
Bait Ul Aafiyat mosque in North Philly

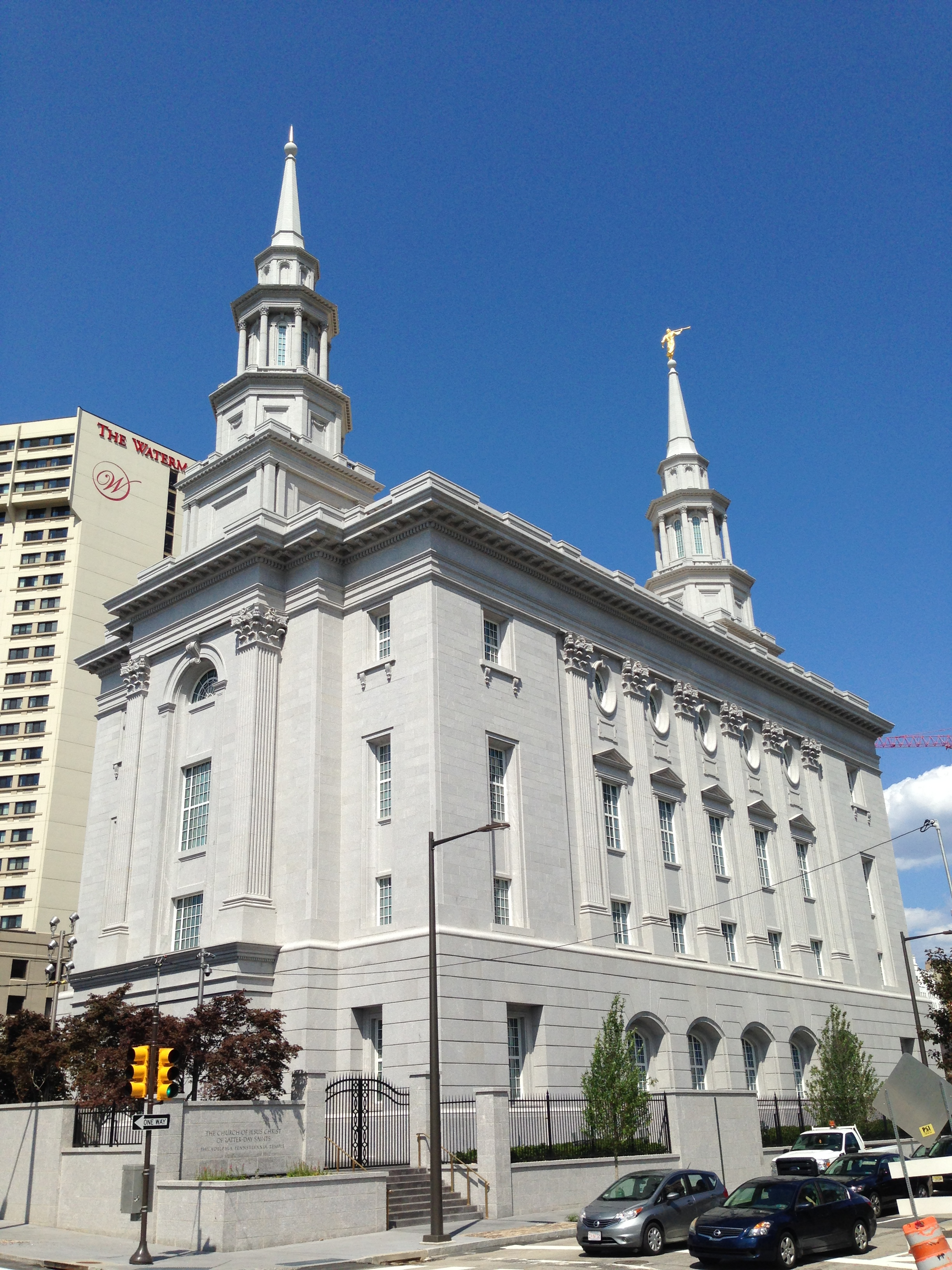
Philadelphia Pennsylvania Temple

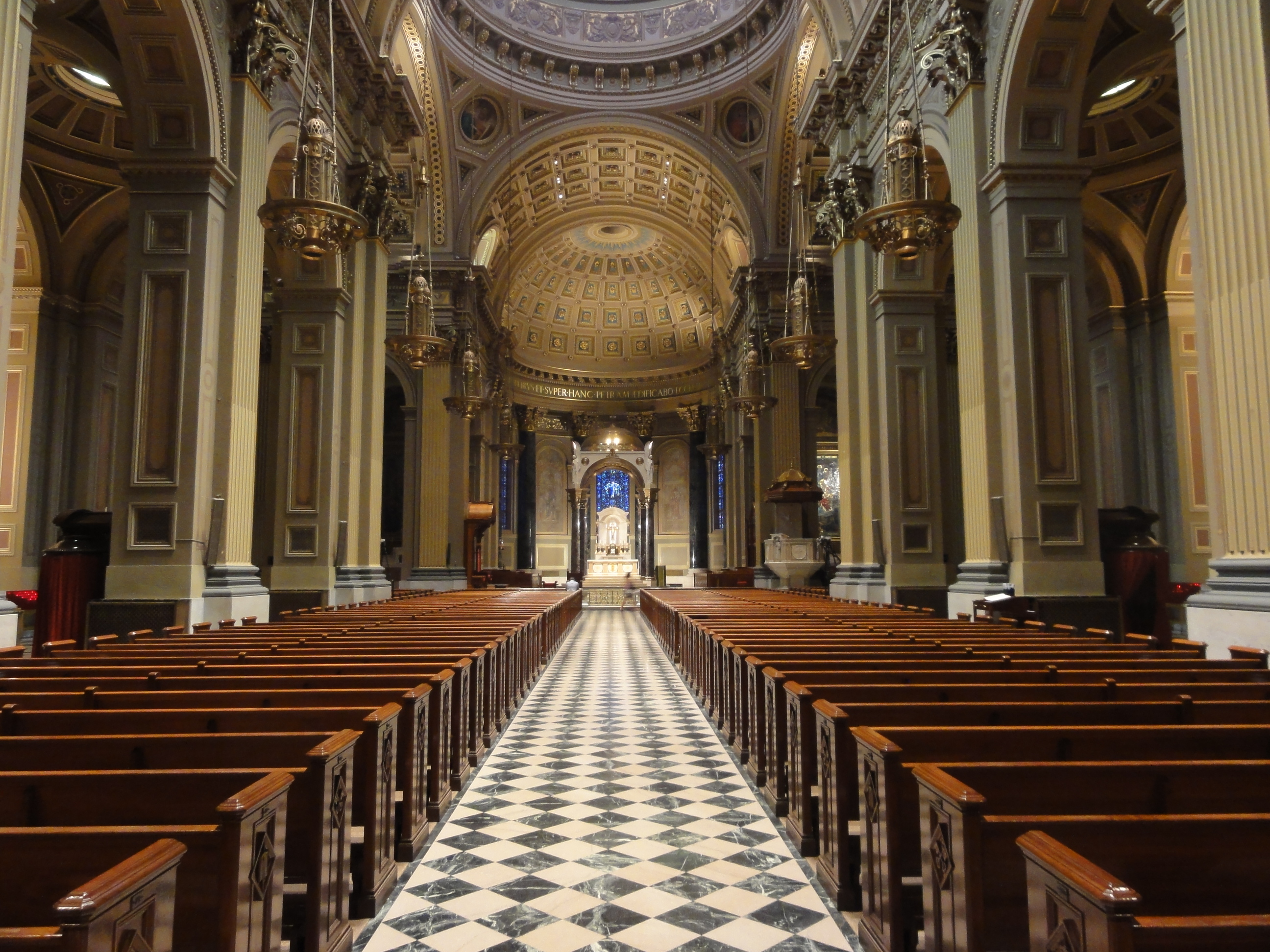
Interior of the Cathedral Basilica of Saints Peter and Paul

== See also ==
- Demographics of Philadelphia
- Culture of Philadelphia

== Bibliography ==
- Religion in Philadelphia by Elizabeth Hayes Alvarez, Philadelphia: Temple University Press, 2016
