= Philly Mosque =

Mosque in Philadelphia, Pennsylvania, United States

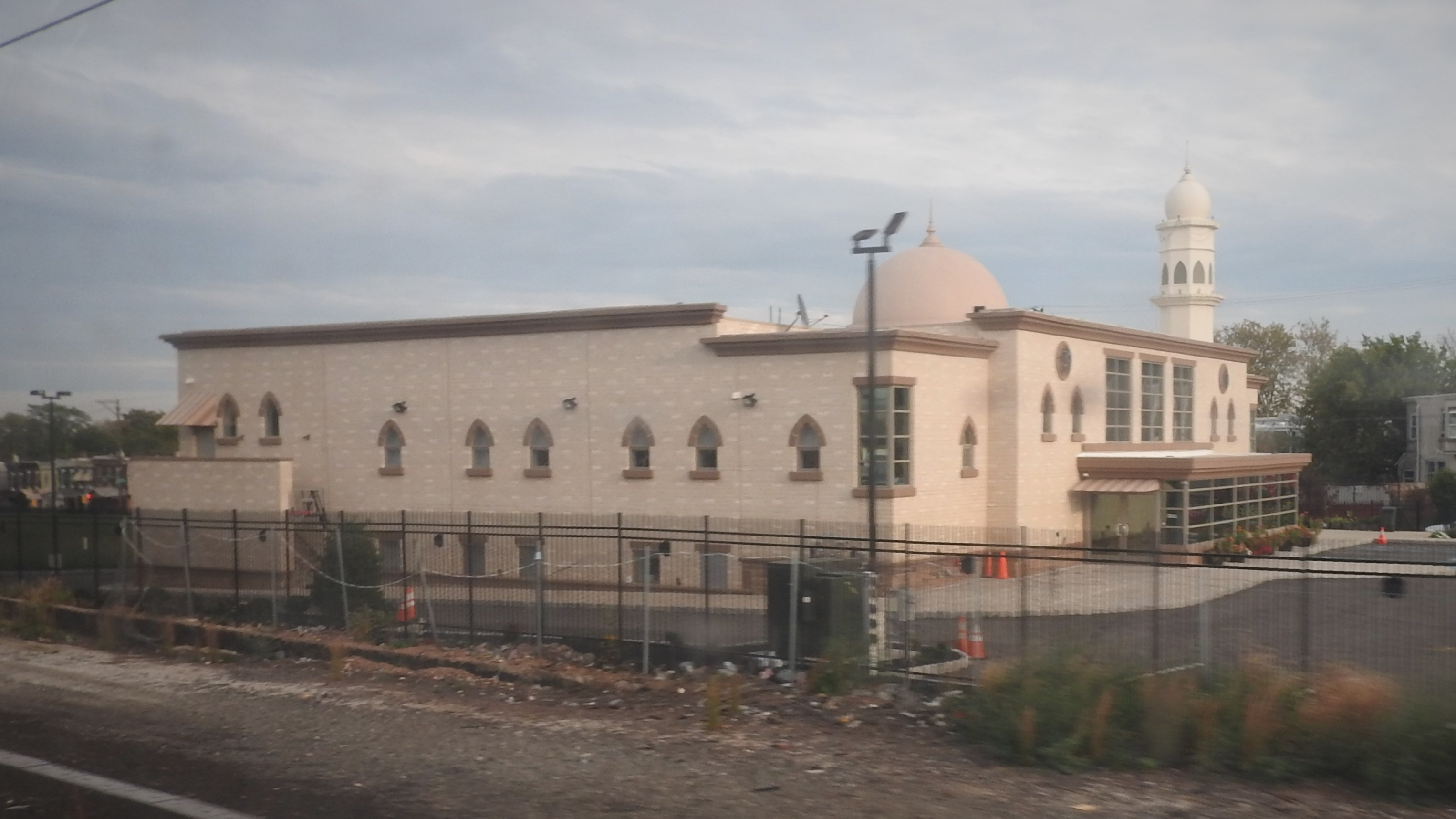

- Location of the mosque in Philadelphia

Religion
- Affiliation: Islam
- Branch/tradition: Ahmadiyya
- Ecclesiastical or organizational status: Mosque
- Status: Active

Location
- Location: Philadelphia, Pennsylvania
- Country: United States
- Interactive map of Philly Mosque
- Coordinates: 39°59′53.0″N 75°09′05.2″W

Architecture
- Architect: Rich Olaya
- Type: mosque
- Groundbreaking: 2013
- Completed: 2018
- Construction cost: US$7 million

Specifications
- Capacity: 700 worshipers
- Interior area: 21,400 square feet (1,990 m^{2})
- Dome: One
- Minaret: One
- Minaret height: 55 feet (17 m)

Website
- www.phillymosque.com

The Bait Ul Aafiyat mosque, more commonly known as the Philly Mosque, or the North Philly Mosque, is a large mosque in Philadelphia, Pennsylvania, in the United States.

== History ==
The construction of the mosque began with fundraising efforts since 2003. Later a vacant land where the mosque currently stands today was purchased in 2007. The land used to be a tire dumping ground. Construction work of the mosque began in 2013. The mosque was officially opened on October 19, 2018 after it was constructed with a cost of US$7 million.

== Architecture ==
The mosque was constructed with traditional Islamic architectural style and consists of a 55-foot (17 m) high minaret. It was designed by Rich Olaya of Olaya Studio. The building consists of 3 floors and it covers an area of 21,400 square feet (1,990 m^{2}). The basement consists of commercial kitchen, the middle floor consists of accommodation rooms and the top floor consists of library and offices. The prayer hall of the mosque spans over an area of 5,000 square feet (460 m^{2}), which are divided into two for male and female, with a combined number that it can accommodate of 700 worshipers.

== See also ==
- Islam in the United States
- List of mosques in the United States
- Religion in Philadelphia
