= Judi Sheppard Missett =

American entrepreneur and dancer (born 1944)

- Born: 1944 (age 81–82); Red Oak, Iowa, U.S.
- Education: Northwestern University
- Occupations: Entrepreneur, dancer
- Known for: Founder of Jazzercise

Judi Sheppard Missett (born 1944) is an American entrepreneur and dancer best known for founding Jazzercise, which she also served as CEO of from 1969 to 2022. Her album "Jazzercise" was the first workout album to be certified gold by RIAA. She currently serves as the company's Executive Chair.

== Biography ==
Judi Sheppard Missett was born in 1944 and born and raised in Red Oak, Iowa. She began dancing at age two and a half, and opened her own dancing studio at age 11. At age 14, she began performing with a touring company as a dancer, where she appeared in shows including Coco, West Side Story, and Mame.

She attended Northwestern University, where she earned a bachelor's degree in theatre and dance, and taught dance classes at a jazz studio under Gus Giordano, but her classes had a 90% drop-out rate. Participants commented to her that she was "teaching the class like we're gonna be professional dancers. But we don't want to be a professional dancer, we just want to look like one." In 1969, she subsequently decided to experiment, having all participants turn away from the mirror, simplifying techniques, and using more encouragement and better music. She featured a warm-up inspired by jazz dance techniques, an up-tempo main workout, and a cooldown period of stretching. By the third class like this, participants had quadrupled, and they continued to grow beyond the limits of the studio. After a recommendation, she called her new technique "Jazzercise".

She moved to Carlsbad, California and began teaching dance for the Parks and Recreation department. It got so popular that the city decided to limit the classes to only people with a Carlsbad address, but women then got PO boxes in Carlsbad to be able to attend classes. She first taught 35 classes a week, but after growing vocal cord nodules from her constant screaming over the music, she reduced her load to twelve. She then decided to start training fellow instructors to meet the demand, first 11, then more and more, switching from in-person training to videos before launching their own production company for it.

She has stated one of her biggest supports in early growth were early instructors who were military personnel or military spouses, many of whom continued to teach Jazzercise even after being transferred. She didn't originally have a business plan. She incorporated in 1979 and began to allow franchising in 1981. As CEO, she continued to teach five classes a week and choreograph the routines, of which she created new ones every ten weeks.

By 2019, she had reduced her class load to three classes per week. She stepped down as CEO in 2022, but has continued as executive chair. As of May 2025, as executive chair she is still considered the company's leader. She has stated the company will "stay around long after" her death.

Her album "Jazzercise" became the first exercise album to be certified gold by the Recording Industry Association of America in 1982. She has also fundraised more than $25,000,000 for charity through Jazzercise as of 2005. She has written multiple books, including The Jazzercise Workout Book and Building a Witness with a Beat.

== Personal life ==
She has been married to her husband Jack, a former TV news reporter, since the mid-to-late 1960s.
