= Unity Day (Philadelphia) =

Unity Day was an annual celebration held in Philadelphia, Pennsylvania, previously along the Benjamin Franklin Parkway. The event promoted unity among family as well as peace among people of all walks of life. Unity Day events and activities focused on family values and multiculturalism. The event provided positive entertainment and information for all ages.

== Event ==
The event was previously sponsored by Philadelphia's WDAS-FM radio station, Southwest Airlines, Chrysler, the Pennsylvania Lottery, VH1 Soul, Western Union, and 20 other companies that provided food, vendors, art exhibitions, literary workshops, a softball game, children's activities, and free music performances.

The 29th annual event was held on August 19, 2007. The 30th annual event, billed as Unity Weekend, was held August 23-24, 2008, at Penn's Landing.

In 2009, The last Unity Day was held August 23, returning to the Ben Franklin Parkway. It was also no longer affiliated with WDAS-FM, after Clear Channel Communications discontinued the event.

== See also ==
- Greek Picnic
