= Greek Picnic =

Coordinates: 39.988270°N 75.188237°W

The Greek Picnic is an annual week-long event during the month of July in Philadelphia, Pennsylvania. Originally designed as a reunion celebrating African American college fraternities and sororities, it later gained popularity among a large population that do not attend college due to its various popular social activities.

== History ==
The Philadelphia Greek Picnic was established in July 1974 at the Belmont Grove in Fairmount Park. The Philadelphia Greek Picnic continues to be the nation's oldest reunion for members of the historic nine African-American fraternities and sororities and people who appreciate and understand college and African American Greek-lettered life.

The Philadelphia Greek Picnic is co-sponsored by the City of Philadelphia, the Office of the Managing Director, the Fairmount Park Commission, the Philadelphia Police Department and the National Pan-Hellenic Council Inc. of Philadelphia. It is managed and coordinated by volunteers of the nine organizations wishing to make the entire week-long experience unforgettable based upon the themes of Scholarship, Fellowship and Respect.

No picnic was planned in 2020 because of the COVID-19 pandemic. They resumed the next year.

The Philadelphia event has inspired other Greek Picnic events in other cities across the United States, including Charlotte, North Carolina.

== Popularity ==
During the early to mid 1990s the picnic grew national notoriety, attracting college students and party-goers from all over the east coast of the United States. The primary festival held in Fairmount Park frequently registered an attendance of 100,000+ people, with another 100,000-200,000 people scattered across the city in support of the events. Also various hip-hop and R&B celebrities can be seen attending the events.

During the week the city receives a large economic boost due to tourism. Hotel and rental-car companies throughout Philadelphia, South Jersey, and Delaware are reserved weeks to months in advance and opportunities for price gouging as the event grows closer are prevalent.

In recent years, the event has grown smaller, quieter and less troublesome to the police as well as attendants due to restructuring by the event organizers.

== See also ==
- Unity Day (Philadelphia)
