= Koresh Dance Company =

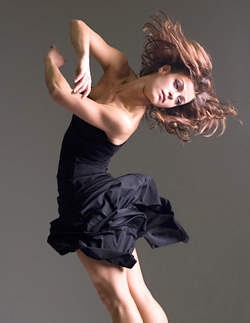
Koresh Dance Company member Jessica Daley

The Koresh Dance Company is a professional dance troupe based in Philadelphia, Pennsylvania. The organization was founded in 1991 by Artistic Director Ronen (Roni) Koresh. The company tours nationally and appears locally two to four times annually. Part of the company's tour schedule is supported by the National Endowment for the Arts' Regional Arts Touring Program and the Pennsylvania Council on the Arts. The troupe's choreography often blends dance styles from a variety of backgrounds and genres including ballet, modern dance, and jazz.
