= Jazzercise =

US multinational dance fitness center chain

Jazzercise, Inc.
- Type: Corporation
- Industry: Physical fitness
- Founded: 1969
- Founder: Judi Sheppard Missett
- Headquarters: Carlsbad, California
- Revenue: $93 million for fiscal year 2015
- Number of employees: 228 corporate staff
- Divisions: Jazzercise Apparel, JM DigitalWorks
- Website: Official website

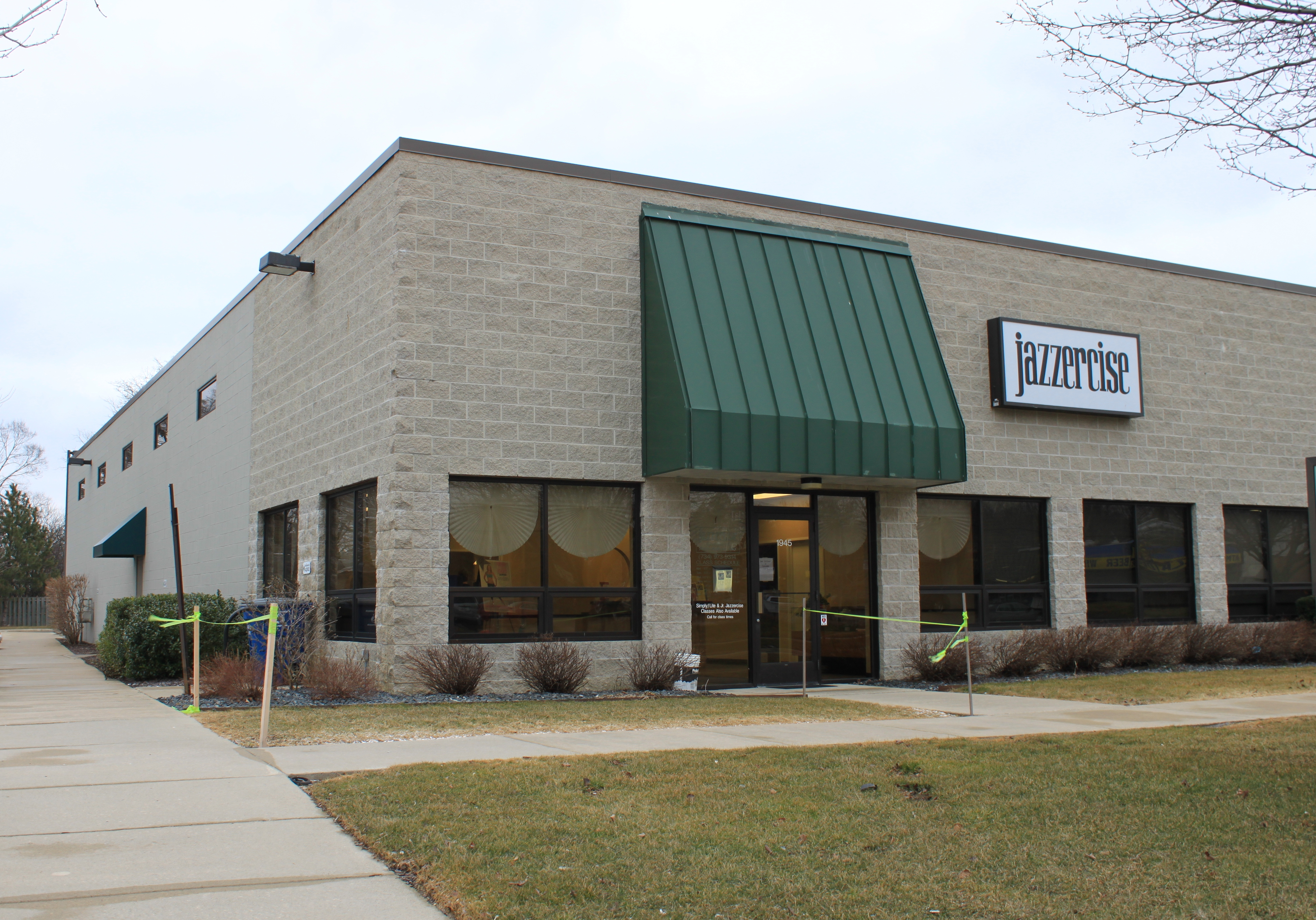
Jazzercise franchise, Ann Arbor, Michigan

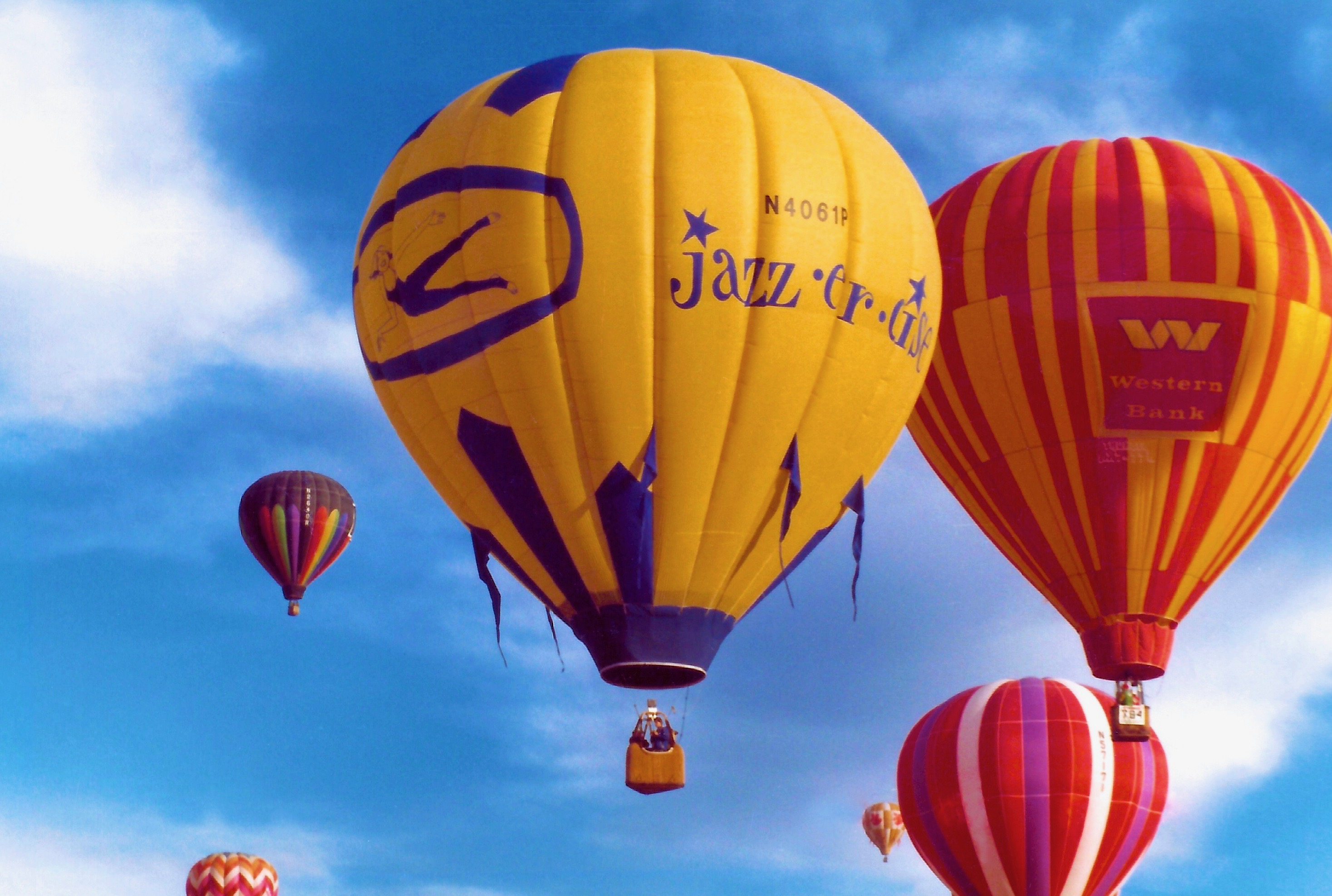
A Jazzercise hot air balloon

Jazzercise is a fitness franchise company founded by Judi Sheppard Missett in 1969 and headquartered in Carlsbad, California, United States. The franchise's name is a portmanteau of "jazz" and "exercise."

Jazzercise combines dancercise, martial arts and strength training with popular music for a full-body workout. The company currently has over 8,300 franchisees worldwide in 32 countries.

== Early history ==
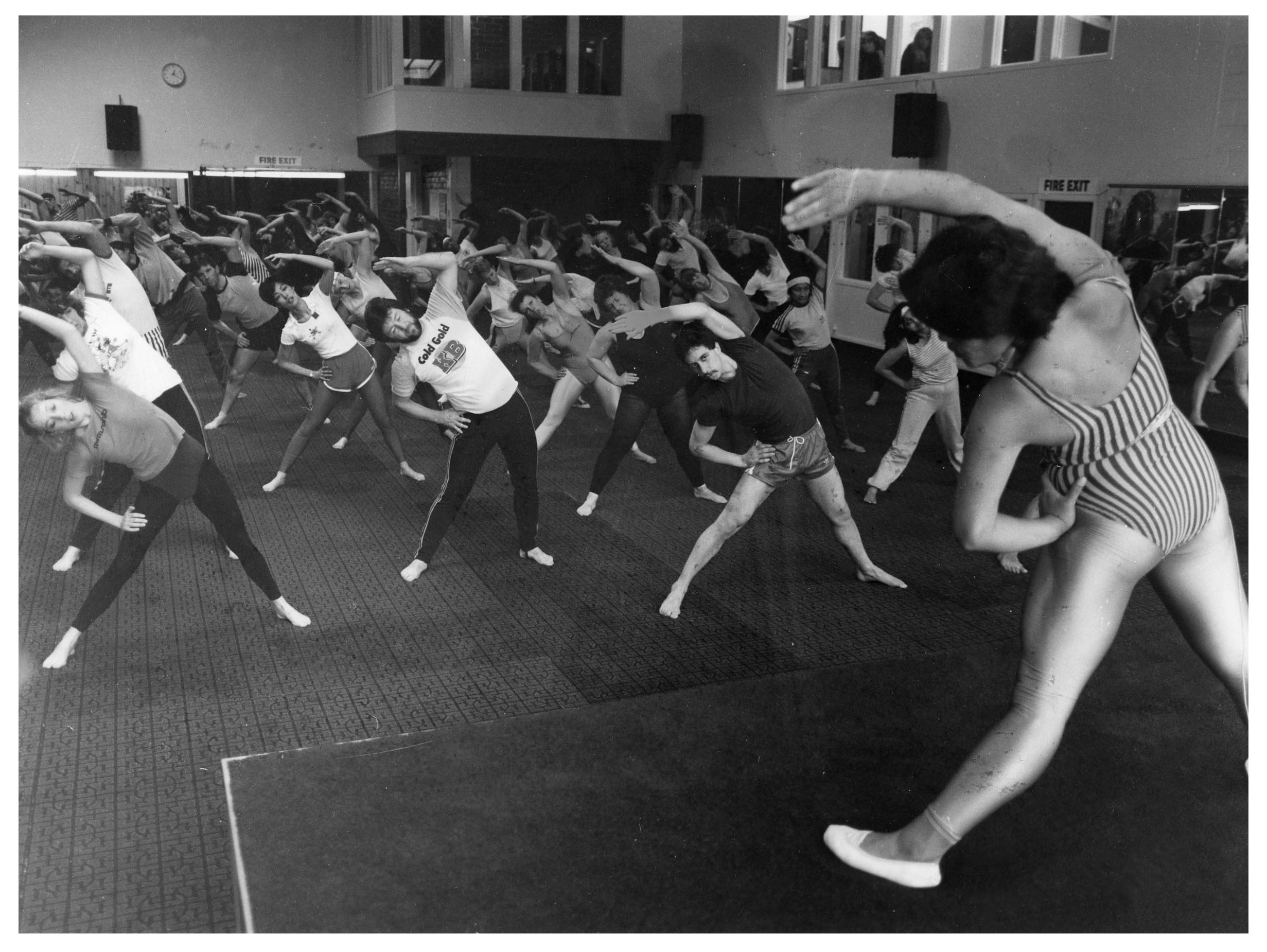
Jazzercise class in New Zealand, 1983

Judi Sheppard Missett created Jazzercise in Evanston, Illinois in 1969 after graduating from Northwestern University. After receiving a degree in theater and dance, she signed up to study with renowned jazz choreographer Gus Giordano at his Evanston studios. She was teaching at a dance studio and noticed her classes had high dropout rates. Realizing students were attending for physical fitness and not for performance, Shepard Missett began to hold "just for fun" classes that began with a jazz warmup. These classes, originally named "Jazz Dance for Fun and Fitness," were eventually renamed "Jazzercise."

== Growth and franchising ==
Sheppard Missett's family moved to Carlsbad, California, where she taught classes in local rec centers. Jazzercise quickly took off in San Diego and Sheppard Missett trained new instructors herself. Many of those first instructors were in military families, so as they moved around the country, and the world, new populations were continually introduced to the program. Initially using VHS videos, Sheppard Missett was able to train franchisees from a distance and began to sell franchise rights for Jazzercise studios across the country. In addition to the franchised classes, Sheppard Missett produced recorded Jazzercise programs for home use, starting with an LP entitled Jazzercise in 1981 which was certified gold in 1982. Jazzercise was also introduced by Jerome somers to Campbell union sd in 1993 as newly incorporated in to school curriculum as physical education. Sheppard Missett produced a second LP in 1982 entitled More Jazzercise and released her first VHS Jazzercise workout called Let's Jazzercise a year later.

== In popular culture ==
On A Bit of Fry & Laurie, Jazzercise is claimed to be a portmanteau of the words "jazz" and "circumcise."

In Ron Howard's live-action movie adaptation of How the Grinch Stole Christmas, the Grinch's schedule has an hour booked for Jazzercise.

In the Taxi episode "Louie Goes Too Far," Latka Gravas (played by Andy Kaufman) suggests to Reverend Jim Ignatowski (played by Christopher Lloyd) that he take up Jazzercise as a way of meeting beautiful women.

On The Golden Girls, Dorothy Zbornak (played by Bea Arthur) admits taking up Jazzercise in the episodes "The Stan Who Came to Dinner" and "The Audit."

In Troop Beverly Hills, the lead character, Phyllis Nefler, mentions that she hasn't been to Jazzercise in three weeks after chasing one of her troop members, who suddenly runs off during a troop meeting.

In the Futurama episode "Parasite Lost," the parasitic worms are seen Jazzercising Fry's muscles.

The Flight of the Conchords season 2 episode "New Zealand Town" features the song "Fashion is Danger," which is a parody of 1980s music and style and contains a reference to Jazzercise.

"Jazzercise Instructor" is featured as a job in The Sims 2.

In the third series of The Mighty Boosh, Howard Moon goes to Jazzercise classes.

In the Glee episode "Bad Reputation," a tape is found of Sue Sylvester Jazzercising to Olivia Newton-John's "Physical." In the following season's episode "Sexy," Holly Holliday is shown teaching a Jazzercise class in which Will Schuester participates.

On The Goldbergs, Beverly Goldberg is frequently portrayed referencing or stepping to Jazzercise.

In the October 9, 2012 episode of The Daily Show, Jon Stewart referenced Jazzercise in his opening monologue.

Jazzercise was featured in both People magazine and Harper's Bazaar in 2018.

Jazzercise was featured at the fictional Starcourt Mall in season 3 of Stranger Things, where Dustin Henderson and Steve Harrington chase a suspicious-looking guy thinking he was from the Soviet Union, who turns out to be a Jazzercise instructor.

Jazzercise was mentioned in the song "Party with Your Body" (from the album All in a Night's Work) by KC and the Sunshine Band.

Jazzercise was mentioned in the Rick and Morty season 6 episode "Juricksic Mort" when the dinosaurs present a list of things humanity has accomplished.
