= List of restaurants in Philadelphia =

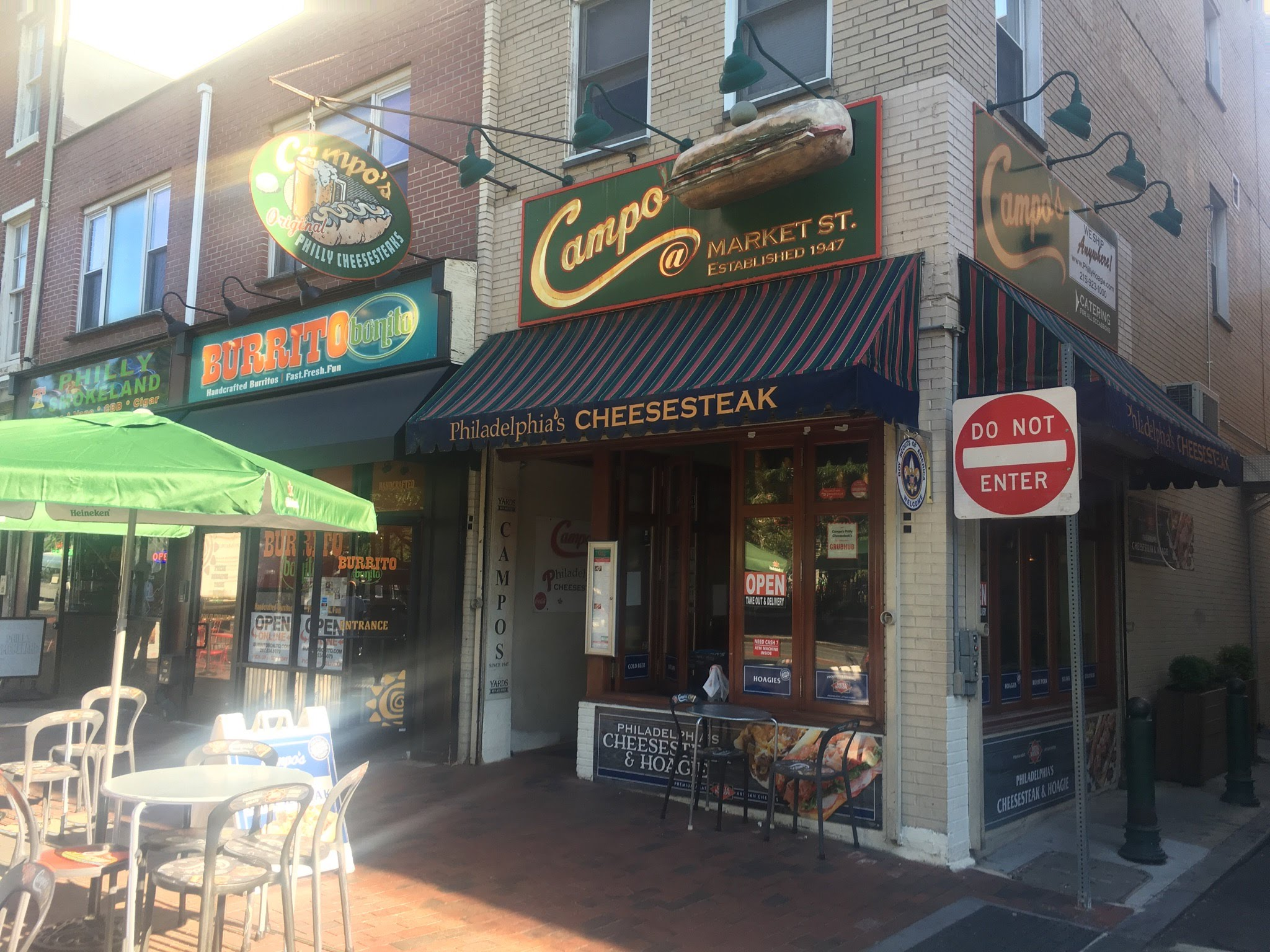
Campo's

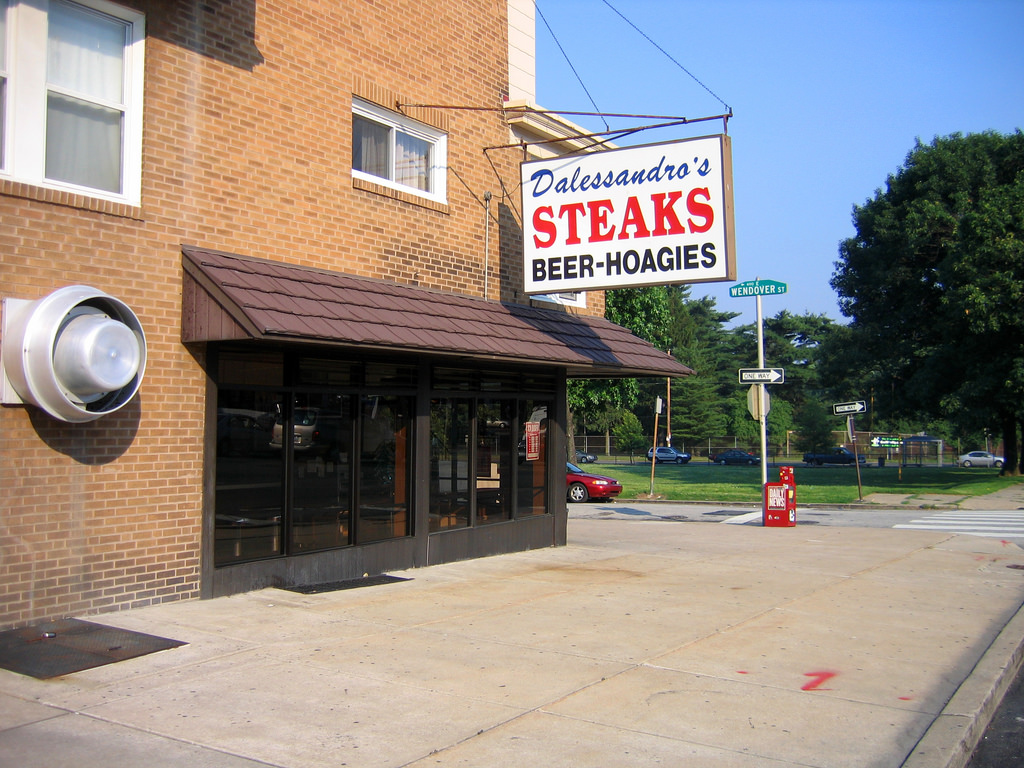
Dalessandro's Steaks

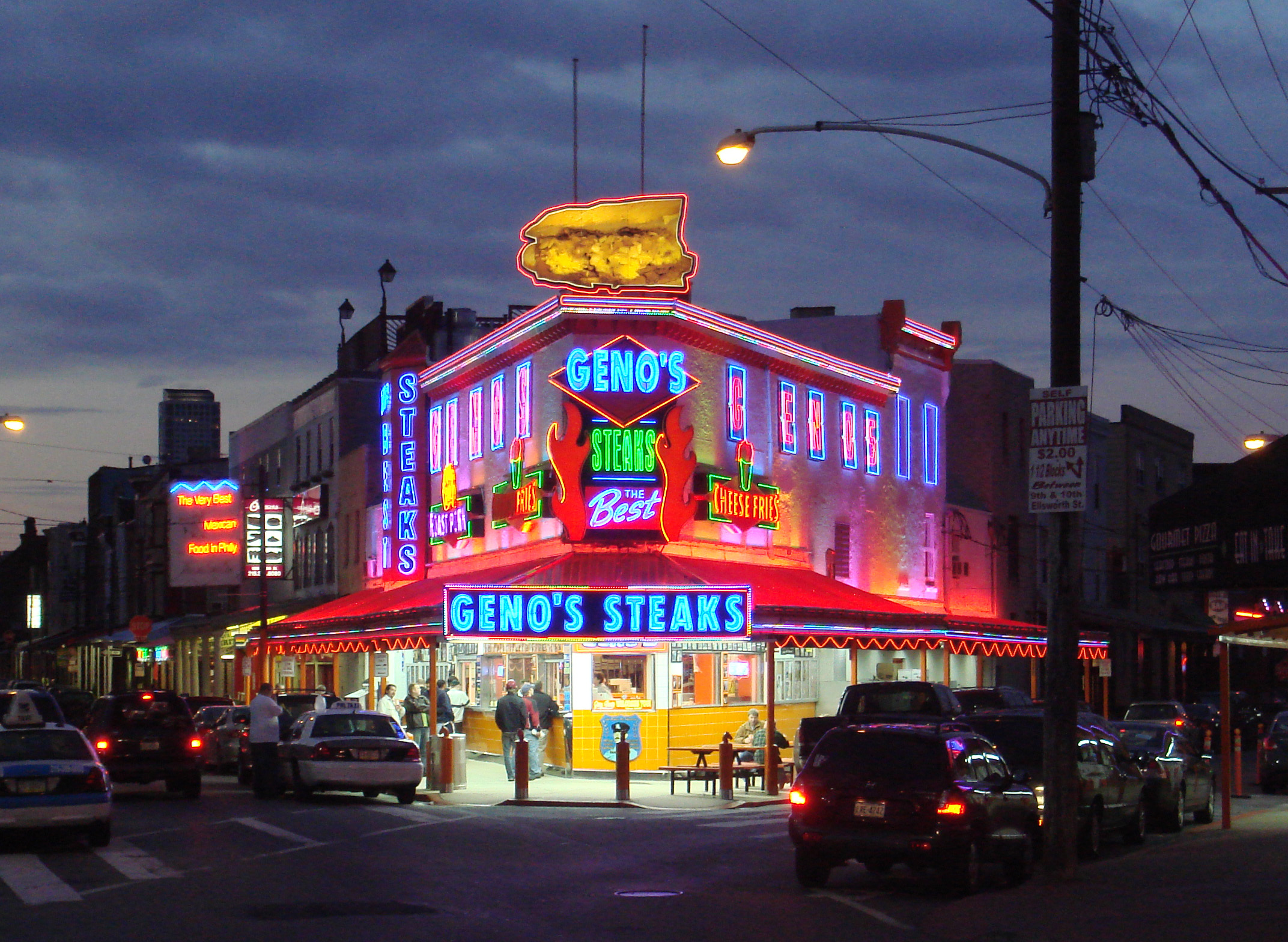
Geno's Steaks

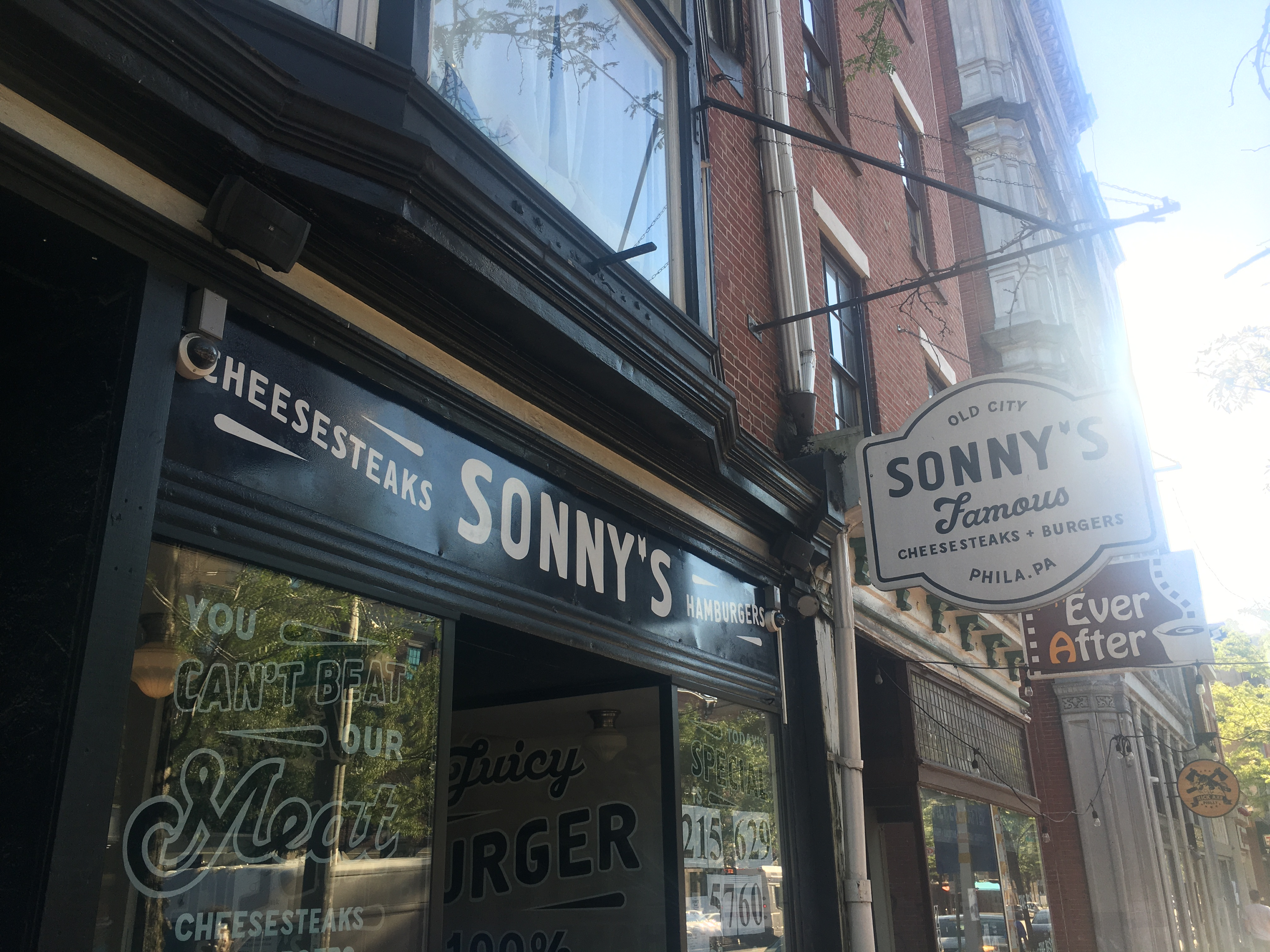
Sonny's Famous Steaks

The following is a list of notable restaurants that have operated in Philadelphia, Pennsylvania:

- Barclay Prime
- Bassett's
- Buddakan
- Campo's
- Cherry Street Tavern
- Chicken George
- Chickie's & Pete's
- City Tavern
- Dalessandro's Steaks
- El Chingon
- Federal Donuts
- Friday Saturday Sunday
- Geno's Steaks
- Her Place Supper Club
- Honeysuckle Provisions
- Horn & Hardart
- Jim's South Street
- Jim's Steaks
- Joe's Steaks + Soda Shop
- John's Roast Pork
- Kalaya
- Le Bec-Fin
- Little Baby's Ice Cream
- London Coffee House
- The Love
- Machine Shop
- Max's Steaks
- McGillin's Olde Ale House
- Meetinghouse
- Moshulu
- My Loup
- Old Original Bookbinder's
- Palumbo's
- Pat's King of Steaks
- Pizza Brain
- Primo Hoagies
- Provenance
- Res Ipsa
- River Twice
- Saxbys Coffee
- Sonny's Famous Steaks
- South Philly Barbacoa
- Steve's Prince of Steaks
- Tony Luke's
- Tun Tavern
- Urban Farmer
- Vedge
- Vietnam Restaurant
- White Dog Cafe
- Zahav

== See also ==
- List of Michelin-starred restaurants in American Northeast Cities
