= 2017 Youth Sailing World Championships – Boy's RS:X =

Boy's RS:X at the 2017 Youth Sailing World Championships
- Venue: Sanya, China
- Dates: 9–16 December
- Competitors: 26 from 26 nations

Medalists
gold medal	Yoav Cohen	Israel
silver medal	Hao Chen	China
bronze medal	Sil Hoekstra	Netherlands

The boy's RS:X competition at the 2017 Youth Sailing World Championships took place between 9 and 16 December. 26 sailors from 26 nations competed in the evnt which was won by Israeli Yoav Cohen.

== Results ==
Pos	Helm	Country	R1	R2	R3	R4	R5	R6	R7	R8	R9	R10	R11	R12	R13	Total	Nett
1	Yoav Cohen	Israel	1	1	3	5	1	2	1	(6)	1	1	1	4	5	32	26
2	Hao Chen	China	2	6	1	1	2	1	2	(8)	2	3	3	1	3	35	27
3	Sil Hoekstra	Netherlands	6	5	4	2	4	4	4	2	4	2	6	(13)	2	58	45
4	Luca Di Tomassi	Italy	4	2	(11)	3	5	5	8	1	7	4	9	3	1	63	52
5	Fernando Gonzalez de la Madrid Trueba	Spain	5	3	2	(9)	3	3	3	3	9	5	7	2	8	62	53
6	Andy Brown	United Kingdom	7	(14)	5	4	13	6	5	5	3	6	8	8	4	88	74
7	Ching Yin Cheng	Hong Kong	(11)	4	7	7	7	8	7	7	10	10	2	10	7	97	86
8	Tom Arnoux	France	3	11	10	(27 DSQ)	6	12	9	9	16	8	5	5	9	130	103
9	Ilia Kirichuk	Russia	8	9	6	10	10	9	13	14	6	7	(17)	7	11	127	110
10	Max van der Zalm	New Zealand	9	16	13	11	8	7	6	10	8	11	(18)	6	17	140	122
11	Jakob Ruud	Norway	13	13	(17)	6	9	13	11	4	11	14	14	9	6	140	123
12	Aleksander Przychodzeń	Poland	16	18	12	8	11	(20)	10	11	14	12	19	19	12	182	162
13	Takumi Ikeda	Japan	10	17	8	22	16	10	12	18	(23)	9	12	14	16	187	164
14	Reynold Chan	Singapore	17	7	14	12	12	11	14	21	20	21	4	12	(25)	190	165
15	Cristobal Hagerman	Mexico	14	8	18	15	15	15	20	20	(22)	17	15	11	13	203	181
16	Daniel Pereira	Brazil	12	10	9	13	17	21	15	17	15	15	(24)	20	19	207	183
17	Steven Cramer	United States	15	19	(23)	18	23	16	17	13	5	18	13	17	10	207	184
18	Belisario Kopp	Argentina	21	15	16	14	14	17	19	(27 DSQ)	19	13	10	22	14	221	194
19	Thomas Broucke	Belgium	20	12	20	19	18	19	(23)	15	13	20	23	16	20	238	215
20	Ting Yu Wang	Chinese Taipei	(24)	21	15	21	21	14	16	16	21	23	16	18	21	247	223
21	Luis Goktepe	Turkey	(25)	24	21	20	25	23	21	12	18	16	11	24	15	255	230
22	Hyeonsu Kim	South Korea	18	20	22	17	19	18	18	(24)	17	24	20	15	24	256	232
23	Alexander Halank	Australia	19	22	(24)	16	22	22	22	19	12	22	22	21	18	261	237
24	Richard Geiger	Hungary	22	23	19	25	20	26	24	(27 DNF)	27 DNF	19	21	25	23	301	274
25	Roco Hrvoj	Croatia	23	25	25	23	24	25	(26)	23	24	25	25	23	22	313	287
26	Emil Lund	Denmark	(27 DNF)	26	26	24	26	24	25	22	25	26	26	26	26	329	302
