= Her Place Supper Club =

Restaurant in Philadelphia, Pennsylvania, U.S.

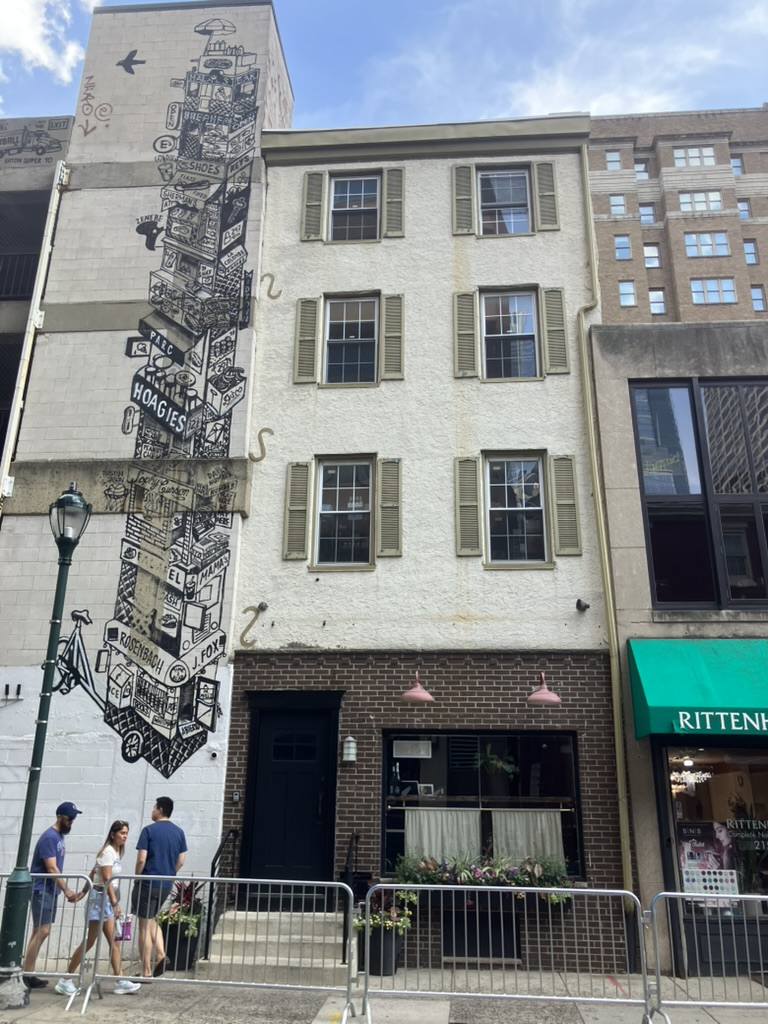
- Her Place Supper Club's exterior in June, 2026
- Interactive map of Her Place Supper Club

Restaurant information
- Established: June 10, 2021; 5 years ago
- Owner: Amanda Shulman
- Head chef: Amanda Shulman
- Food type: French; Italian; Jewish
- Rating: (Michelin Guide)
- Location: 1740 Sansom Street, Philadelphia, Pennsylvania, 19103, United States
- Coordinates: 39°57′03″N 75°10′13″W
- Seating capacity: 24
- Reservations: Recommended
- Website: www.herplacephilly.com

Her Place Supper Club, or simply Her Place, is a Michelin-starred restaurant in Rittenhouse Square, Philadelphia. Founded in 2021 by head chef and owner Amanda Shulman, in November 2025, it became one of the first restaurants in Philadelphia to receive a Michelin star, along with Friday Saturday Sunday and Provenance.

== See also ==
- List of Michelin-starred restaurants in American Northeast Cities
- List of restaurants in Philadelphia
