= Martin's Famous Pastry Shoppe =

American bakery company headquartered in Pennsylvania

Martin's Famous Pastry Shoppe, Inc.
- Type: Private
- Industry: Food (bakery)
- Founded: 1958
- Founders: Lloyd and Lois Martin
- Headquarters: Chambersburg, Pennsylvania, U.S.
- Key people: Jim Martin (Executive chair); Tony Martin (President)
- Products: Potato rolls, breads
- Website: potatorolls.com

Martin's Famous Pastry Shoppe, Inc., is a family owned and operated bakery company, headquartered in Chambersburg, Pennsylvania, United States. Its potato roll is favored as a hamburger and sandwich bun by many famous chefs, including Danny Meyer and David Chang. J. Kenji López-Alt once considered the roll "the gold standard of burger buns", although he no longer supports the company due to political donations by Jim Martin, its chairman.

== History ==
=== 20th century ===
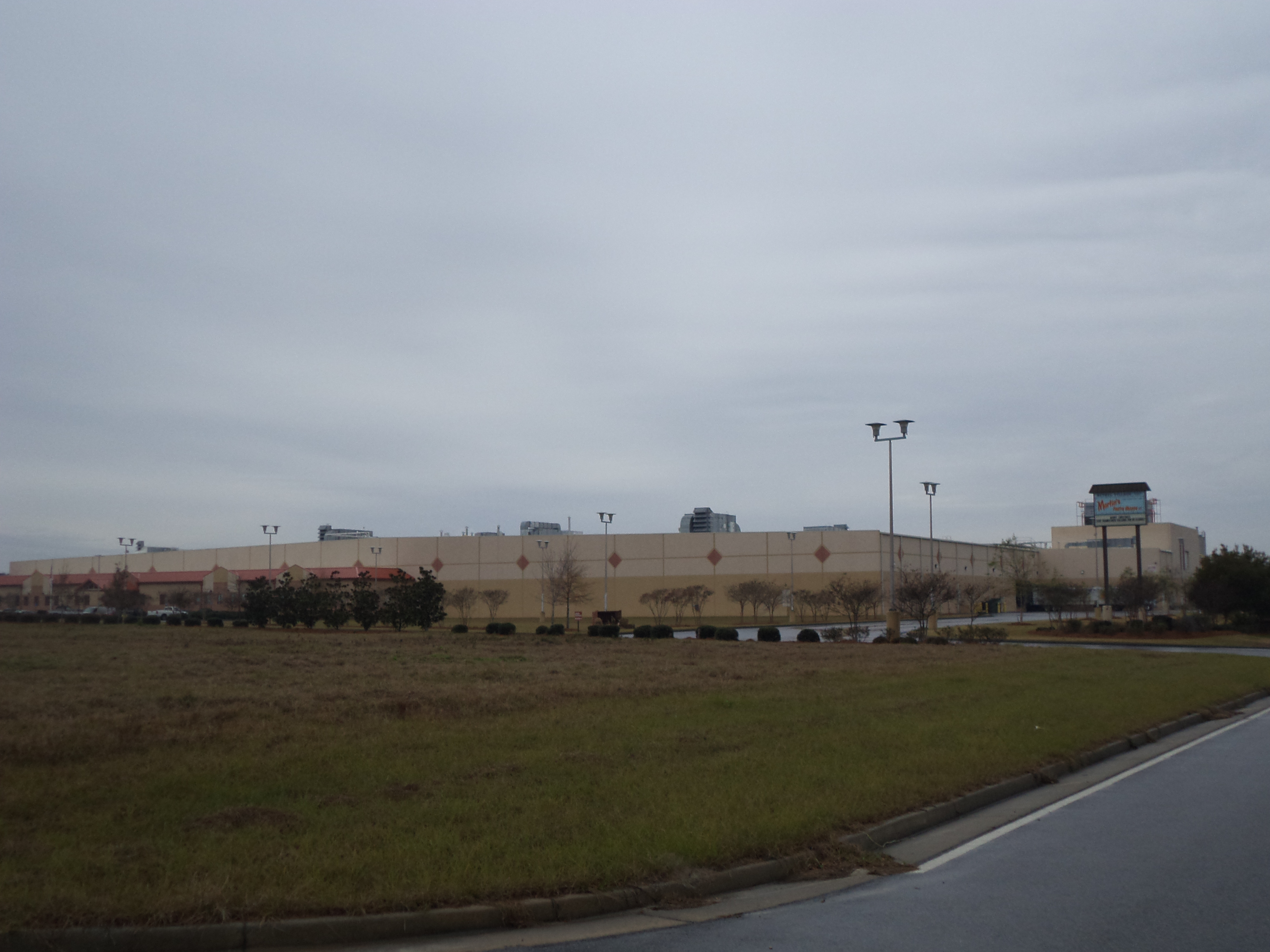
The company's Valdosta, Georgia, location

In the 1950s, Lloyd Martin worked as a baker for his parents-in-law at Wenger's Bakery, but was replaced in 1955 after expressing his desire to open a bakery of his own. Afterwards, Lloyd and his wife, Lois Martin, began baking potato rolls from their home in Chambersburg, selling them to local grocery stores and weekend farmer's markets, along with cookies, pastries, and other snacks. They were successful enough that Martins incorporated their home business in 1957, converting their garage into a bakery and eventually opening Martin's Family Restaurant in 1967, with restaurant space and a dedicated bakery at the back. By 1978, the restaurant could no longer meet the demand for Martin's Potato Rolls, so the bakery was moved to its present location on Potato Roll Lane in Chambersburg, Pennsylvania. When the facility was initially built it was about a fifth of its current size.

=== 21st century ===
Chef Danny Meyer selected the Martin's potato roll for his new hamburger restaurant, Shake Shack, in 2004. The growth of the Shake Shack chain would bring international demand and widespread attention in culinary circles.

Increased competition in the restaurant business led Jim Martin, Lloyd's son and then-president of the company, to narrow the bakery's focus to core products and distribution through grocery stores.

In 2007, Martin's broke ground on a 220,000 square-foot second production facility in Valdosta, Georgia, with plans for a 170,000 square-foot expansion. Production began in late 2008.

In 2012, the company announced that it was opening a visitors' center in Guilford Township, just outside Chambersburg. The "Golden Roll" features Lloyd and Lois Martin's original garage bakery and other artifacts from the company's history.

Jim Martin passed the role of president to his son, Tony, in July 2021. Jim remains involved with the direction and strategy of the company, and other Martin family members are active as parts of the company's senior leadership.

=== Controversy ===
In 2022, campaign finance records revealed that the Martin family had contributed over $125,000 to Pennsylvania gubernatorial candidate Doug Mastriano. Jim Martin donated $110,000 in 2021, more than twice the amount from any other donor. Customers called for a boycott, upset by Mastriano's positions on President Donald Trump, denial of the 2020 presidential election, support of a total abortion ban, opposition to LGBT rights, and other issues. Philadelphia chain Federal Donuts dropped Martin's as a supplier for its chicken sandwiches, in favor of Baltimore-based Schmidt Baking Company. Shake Shack declined to break its relationship with the bakery, but claimed that the donations did not "express the values of Shake Shack", promising "active conversations with Martin’s to express [their] concern."

Martin's released a statement that the donations were the personal decisions of individual Martin family members and the company itself was committed to "the values that have made our company successful – baking quality products, providing excellent service to our customers, and supporting the communities around [it]."

== See also ==
- List of bakeries
