= Little Baby's Ice Cream =

Ice cream company

Restaurant information
- Established: 2011
- Closed: November 2019
- Food type: Ice cream
- Location: Philadelphia

Little Baby's Ice Cream was an American ice cream company and a restaurant chain based in Philadelphia, Pennsylvania. It permanently closed in 2019.

== History ==
The company began in 2011, selling ice cream from tricycles. A brick and mortar location opened in August 2012. The company received national attention for a 2012 commercial, "This is a Special Time", in which a person apparently made of ice cream uses a spoon to consume ice cream from their own head. The commercial was directed by Doug Garth Williams and narrated by Matthias Bossi, with the ice cream person portrayed by Asa Scheibe. The music was composed by Jon Guez. The actual substance used on Scheibe was Jet-Puffed Marshmallow Cream. Williams used After Effects to create the special effects for the ice cream person's head dent, carving out Scheibe's head by warping it in post. The company introduced pre-packaged ice cream pints in 2015 in containers similar to oyster pails.

The company had locations in Philadelphia, Washington D.C. and Baltimore. Along with pizza restaurant Pizza Brain, the company faced harassment from Pizzagate conspiracists.

In November 2019, Little Baby's permanently closed.

== Products ==
The company was known for its specialty flavors, including Earl Grey Sriracha, Vanilla Cardamom Cream, and Pizza. In 2018, the company released a CBD-infused ice cream.

Little Baby's had collaborated on foods with many other Philadelphia-based companies: pizza-flavored ice cream with Pizza Brain, PYNK-flavored ice cream with Yards Brewing Company, and multiple collaborations with Federal Donuts.
