= Kadima-Zoran =

Local council in Israel

Kadima-Zoran קָדִימָה צוֹרָן
- Local council (from 2003)

Hebrew transcription(s)
  - ISO 259: Qadíma-Çoran
  - Also spelled: Kadima-Tzoran (official)
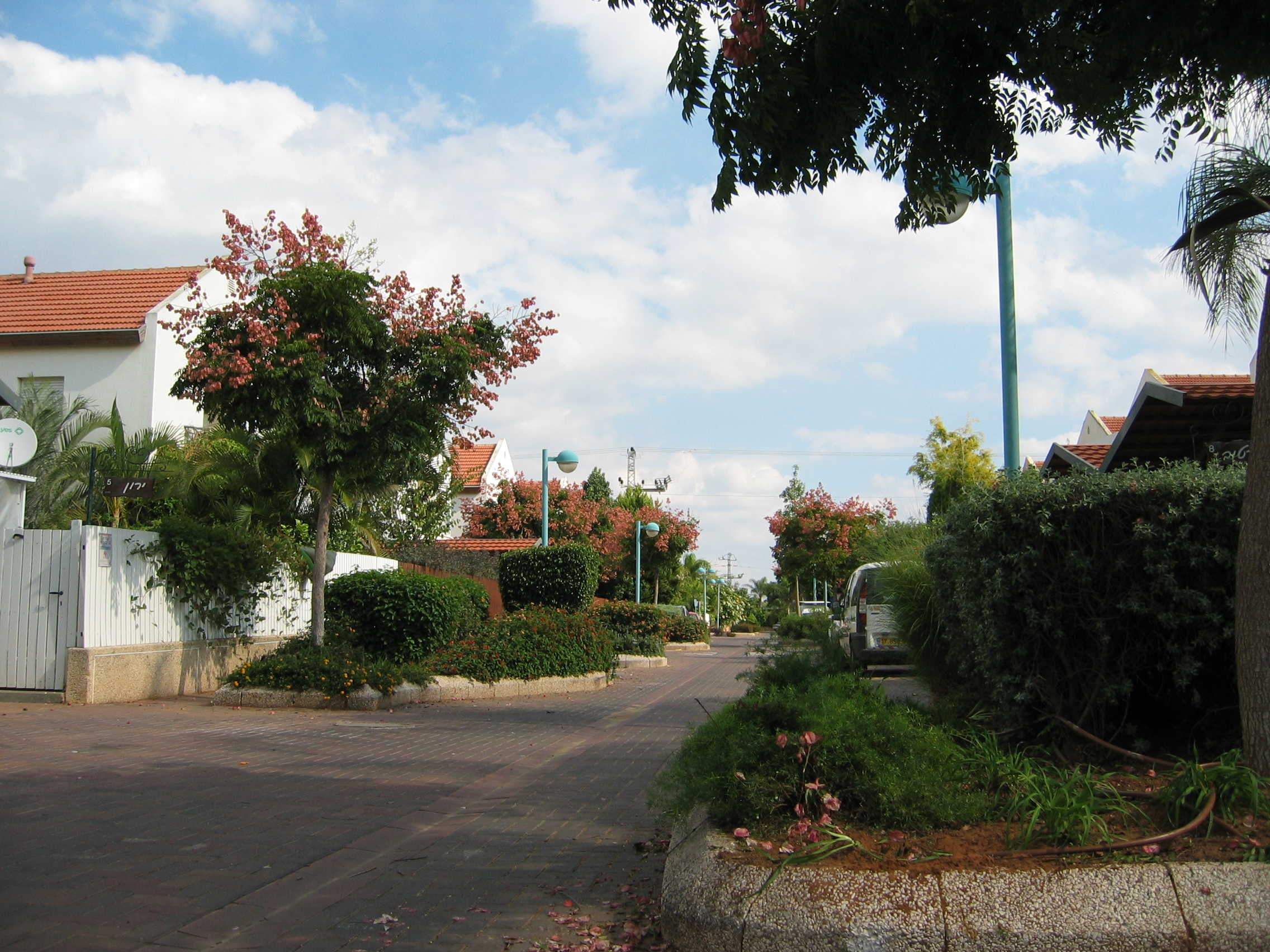

- Location within Central Israel Location within Israel
- Coordinates: 32°16′34″N 34°54′40″E
- Country: Israel
- District: Central
- Subdistrict: HaSharon
- Natural Region: Western Sharon
- Founded: 2003 (merger)

Government
  - Head of Municipality: Keren Green

Area
  - Total: 10,372 dunams (10.372 km^{2}; 4.005 sq mi)

Population (2024)
  - Total: 22,655
  - Density: 2,184.2/km^{2} (5,657.2/sq mi)
- Name meaning: "Forward"-"Silicon"

Kadima-Zoran (Hebrew: קדימה-צורן), also known as Kadima-Tzoran, is a local council in the Central District of Israel. The result of the 2003 union of the Tzoran and Kadima councils, in 2024 it had a population of 22,655.

Kadima-Zoran is home to the "Ta'am Shel Pa'am" (A Taste of Old Times) museum for the history of the settlement in the elementary school Nitzanei HaSharon.

== History ==
Before the 20th century, the territory of Kadima-Zoran formed part of the Forest of Sharon, a hallmark of the region's historical landscape. It was an open woodland dominated by Mount Tabor Oak (Quercus ithaburensis), which extended from Kfar Yona in the north to Ra'anana in the south. The local Arab inhabitants traditionally used the area for pasture, firewood and intermittent cultivation. The intensification of settlement and agriculture in the coastal plain during the 19th century led to deforestation and subsequent environmental degradation known from Hebrew sources.

=== Kadima ===
Kadima was founded on 5 July 1933 as an agricultural settlement at the initiative of Yehoshua Hankin. Most of the settlers were German immigrants. The name means "forward" in Hebrew, and was taken from a Biblical verse (Habakkuk 1:9). The town was declared a local council in 1950.

=== Tzoran ===
Tzoran, meaning silicon, was founded in 1992 and was planned by architect Rachel Walden. The settlement was named after a Hasmonean city that had existed in the area. It was first populated in 1994, and declared a local council in 1997.

== Demographics ==
Historical population
Year	Pop.	±%
1972	4,100	—
1983	3,300	−19.5%
1995	5,100	+54.5%
2008	16,500	+223.5%
2022	22,153	+34.3%
2024	22,655	+2.3%

== Voting Patterns ==
In the 2022 election, 64 percent of voters in Kadima-Zoran voted for the parties of the center-left coalition led by Yair Lapid, while 34 percent voted for the parties of the right-wing coalition led by Benjamin Netanyahu and 0.2 percent voted for the Arab parties.

In the 2026 election, 65 percent of voters in Kadima-Zoran voted for the parties of the center-left coalition led by Gadi Eisenkot, while 30 percent voted for the parties of the right-wing coalition led by Benjamin Netanyahu and 0.2 percent voted for the Arab parties. An additional 3.6 percent voted for the Reservists, and 1.5 percent voted for Amcha Yisrael. Voter turnout increased 14 percent from the 2022 election.

== Notable people ==
- Tohar Butbul (born 1994), Olympic judoka
- Yoav Cohen (born 1999), Olympic windsurfer
- Roi Huber (born 1997), basketball player
- David Levin (born 1999), ice hockey player
- Yizhar Shai, (born 1963), Israeli politician
