= Sonny's Famous Steaks =

Restaurant in Pennsylvania, United States

Sonny’s Famous Steaks
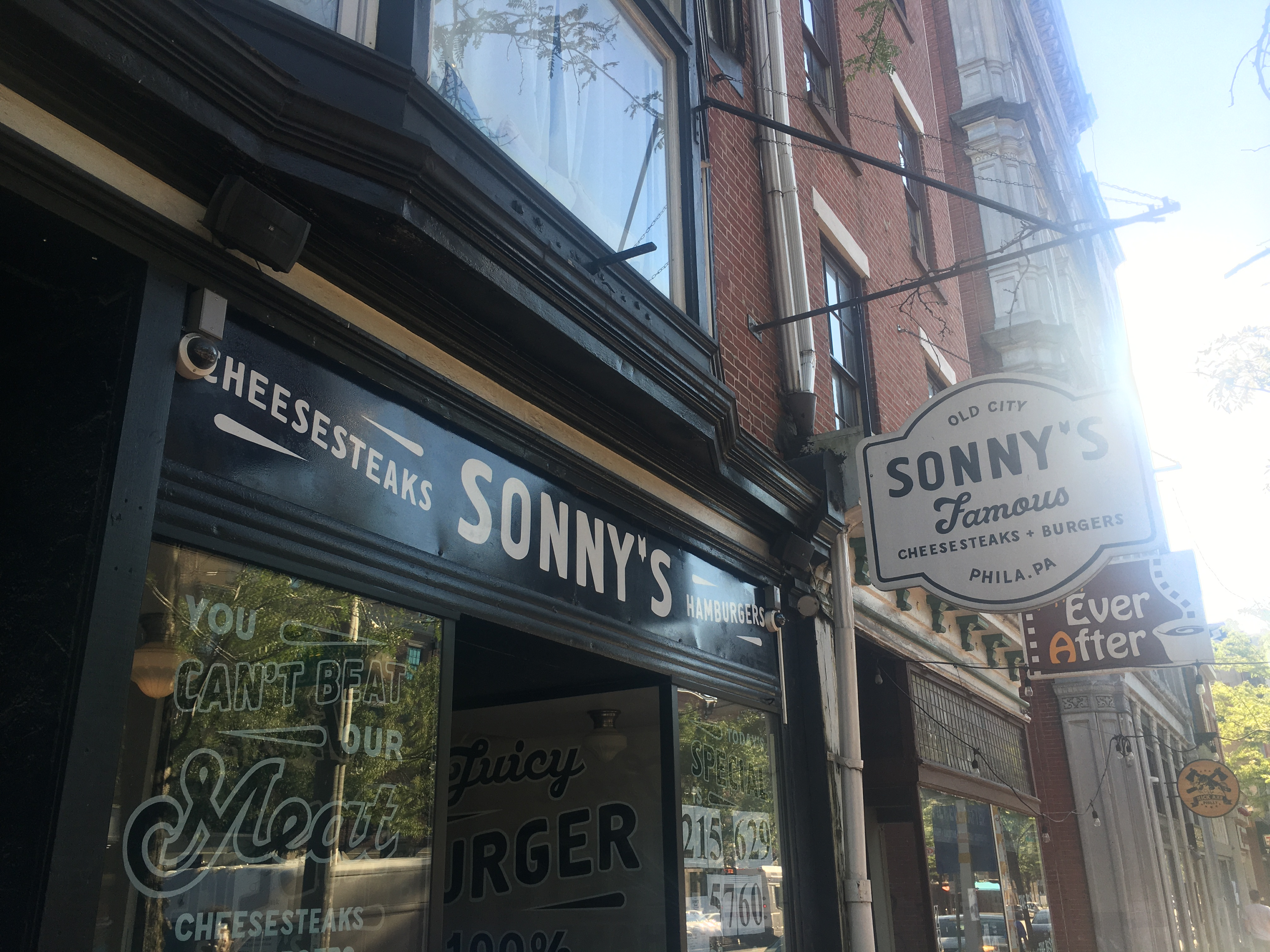
- Entrance to Sonny's

Restaurant information
- Established: 1999; 27 years ago
- Owners: Kevin Bagby, Faye Jew Woody, and Ellen Mogell
- Food type: Cheesesteaks and other sandwiches
- Dress code: Casual
- Location: 228 Market St, Philadelphia, United States, Pennsylvania, 19106
- Website: www.sonnyscheesesteaks.com

Sonny's Famous Steaks is a cheesesteak restaurant located on Market Street in Old City, Philadelphia. It consistently ranks as one of the best cheesesteaks in Philadelphia.

== History ==
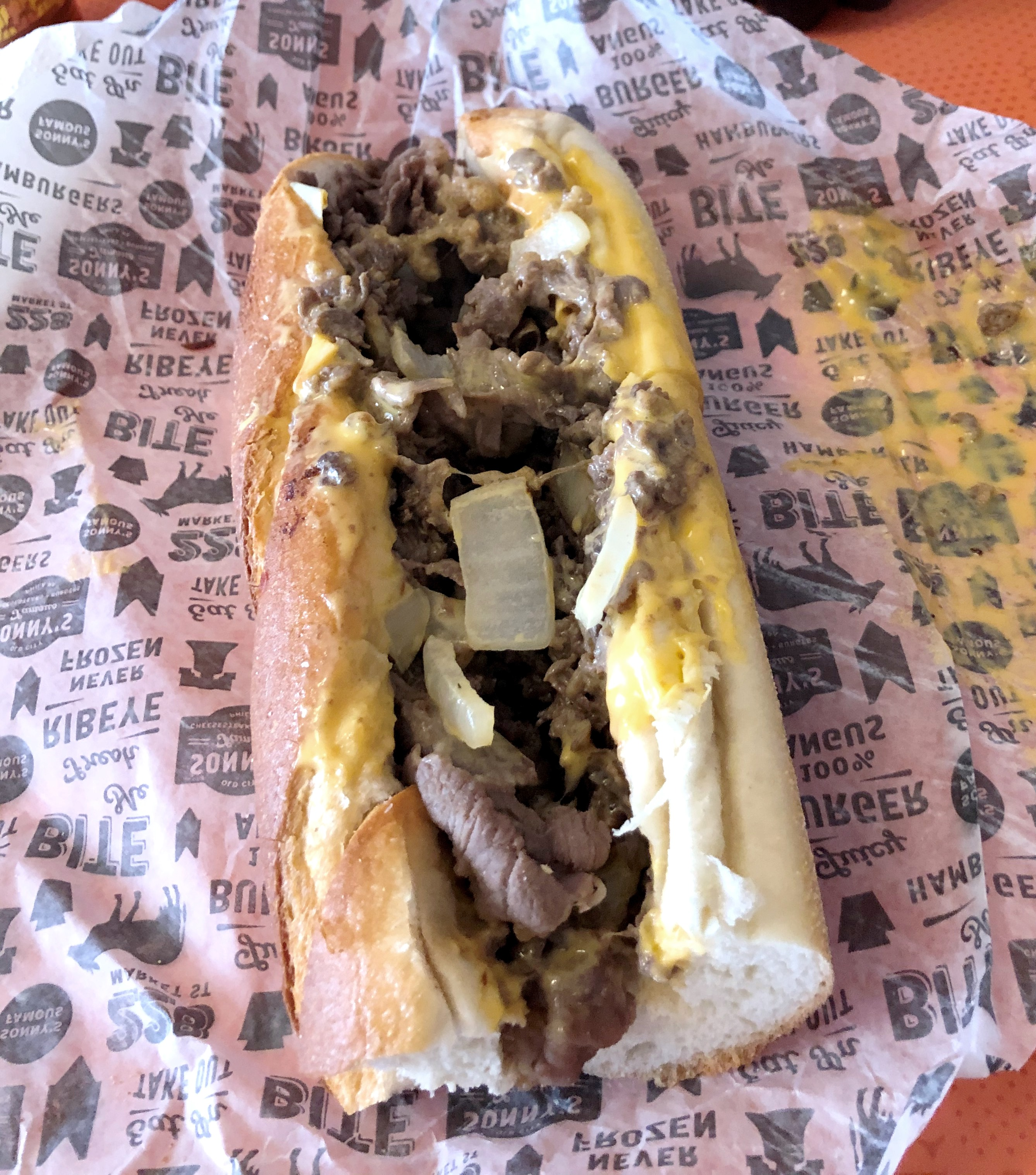
A cheesesteak from Sonny's

Sonny's opened in 1999. It is currently owned by Ellen Mogell and Kevin Bagby. Bagby began working at Sonny's in 2001 while he was a Temple University student. He claims he ate a lot of cheesesteaks while working there and started Brazilian jiu-jitsu to lose weight. Sonny's won Best of Philly's Best Cheesesteak in 2001.

In 2013, Sonny's underwent renovations and created its current black and white design. The interior is black with white walls and an old storefront look with "chrome-rimmed, fifties-style, communal tables".

In 2014, GQ Magazine ranked Sonny's the best cheesesteak in Philadelphia. The rankings were published in an article by food correspondent Alan Richman. Twenty-three cheesesteaks were evaluated by five judges—Richman, University of Pennsylvania physician Benjamin Abella, a former Philadelphia Magazine restaurant critic Maria Gallagher, Chicago Magazine restaurant critic Jeff Ruby, and Philadelphia sports broadcaster Ray Didinger.

John L. Dorman of The New York Times recommended Sonny's for an "authentic cheesesteak experience" over Pat's King of Steaks and Geno's Steaks.

Serious Eats's founder Ed Levine and editor Niki Achitoff-Gray tried over 30 cheesesteaks in two days and said Sonny's was in their favorite four, which also included Dalessandro's Steaks, John's Roast Pork and Campo's. Arthur Etchells of Philadelphia magazine's food blog Foobooz agreed, ranking John's and Sonny's above Dalessandro's and Campo's.

In 2017, U.S. News & World Report named Sonny's one of the top five cheesesteaks in Philadelphia, citing its proximity to Independence Hall and the Liberty Bell.

In 2022, Tripadvisor recognized Sonny's as one of the best dining destinations in the United States as part of their Traveler's Choice Award series.

== See also ==
- List of submarine sandwich restaurants
