= Lindley Johnson =

American architect

Lindley Johnson (January 18, 1854—February 27, 1937) was a noted Philadelphia architect. Johnson was born in the Germantown neighborhood of Philadelphia, Pennsylvania, and attended Germantown Academy before graduating from the University of Pennsylvania in 1875. He went on to be trained at École des Beaux-Arts for three years.

Johnson spent one year in the office of Frank Furness, another noted Philadelphia architect before starting his own firm.

He was one of the founders of Philadelphia's T-Square Club.

== Notable buildings ==
- Designed than 20 commissions on Grindstone Neck, Winter Harbor, Maine. Including the Winter Harbor Yacht Club, the Episcopal Church, and The Grindstone Inn.
- Princeton Club at 1221 Locust Street, Philadelphia, Pennsylvania
- Poplar House, Radnor Township, Pennsylvania
