= Meetinghouse (restaurant) =

Restaurant in Philadelphia, Pennsylvania, U.S.

- Interactive map of Meetinghouse

Restaurant information
- Location: 2331 E. Cumberland St., Philadelphia, Pennsylvania, 19125, United States
- Coordinates: 39°58′49″N 75°07′23″W

Meetinghouse is a restaurant in Philadelphia, Pennsylvania.

== History ==
The restaurant replaced Memphis Taproom, which occupied the space for 15 years. Meetinghouse was opened by Colin McFadden, Keith Shore, Marty West and Andrew DiTomo. The restaurant serves beer under its own label, brewed by Tonewood Brewing.

== Reception ==
In a review for Philadelphia Magazine, Jason Sheehan awarded the restaurant two of four possible stars, and praised its beer and the ambience. Meetinghouse was named one of the twenty best new restaurants of 2024 by Bon Appétit.

Nikita Richardson chose Meetinghouse as her "Restaurant of the Year" for 2025, praising the restaurant's ambience, offerings, and affordability. The restaurant was also featured on the New York Times list of the 50 best restaurants in the United States for 2025, with a positive review written by Richardson.

== See also ==
- List of restaurants in Philadelphia
