= Ganei Yehuda =

Ganei Yehuda: גני יהודה (Hebrew)
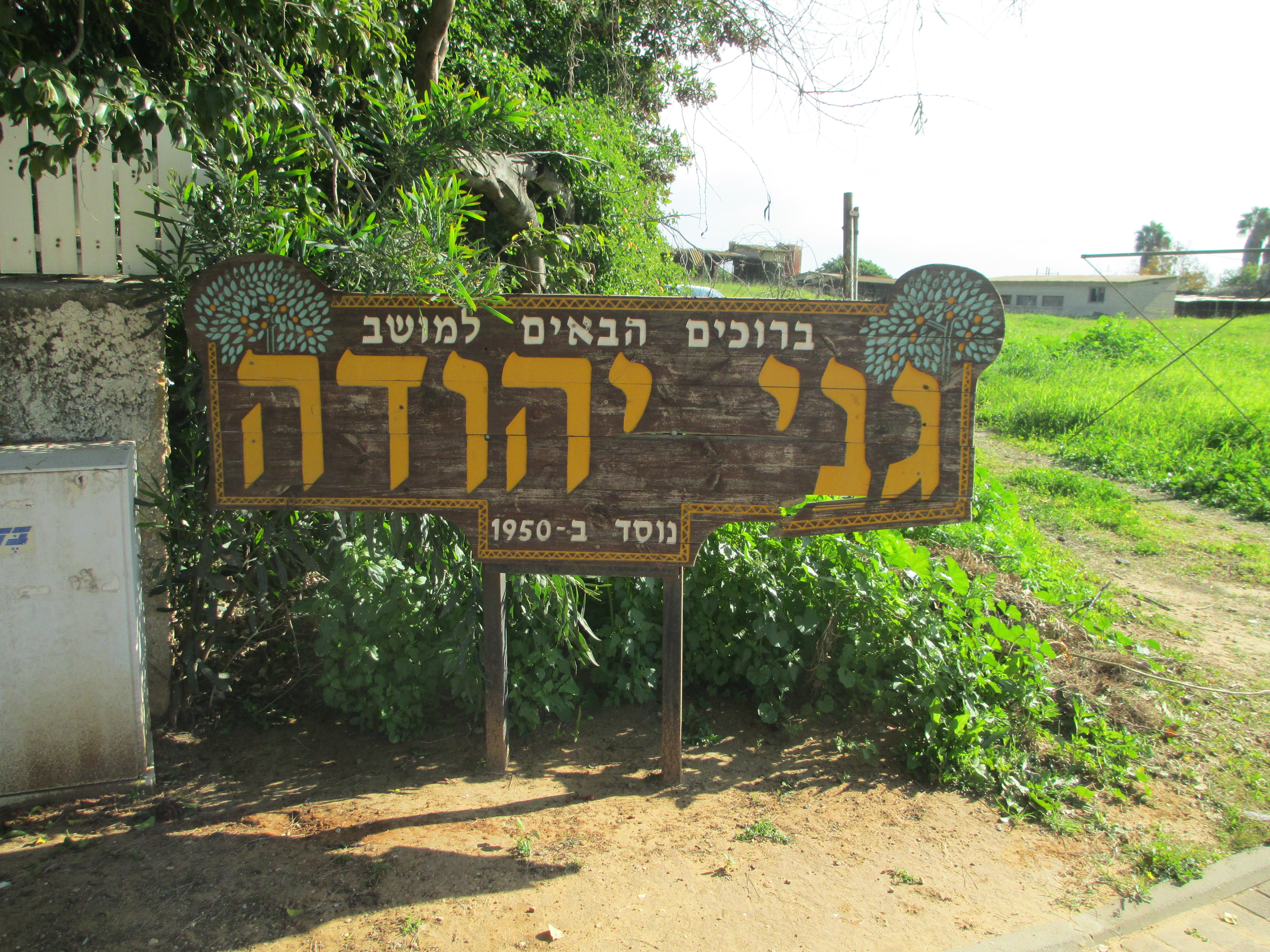

- Location within Central Israel Location within Israel
- Coordinates: 32°2′21″N 34°52′35″E
- Country: Israel
- District: Central
- Founded: 1950

Ganei Yehuda (Hebrew: גני יהודה, lit. 'Gardens of Judah') was a moshav founded in 1950 in the Ono Valley, adjacent to the cities of Yehud and Kiryat Ono. It was named after the biblical figure Judah whom was the fourth son of Jacob and Leah and the founder of the Israelite Tribe of Judah.

In 2003 Ganei Yehuda was merged into Savyon.

Both Savyon and Ganei Yehuda are located on land that had belonged to the Palestinian village of al-'Abbasiyya, which was depopulated in the 1948 Arab–Israeli War.

== Notable people ==
- Yoav Cohen (born 1999), Israeli Olympic windsurfer
- Michael Solomonov, Israeli-American restauranter and chef
