= Princeton Club (Philadelphia) =

- U.S. National Register of Historic Places
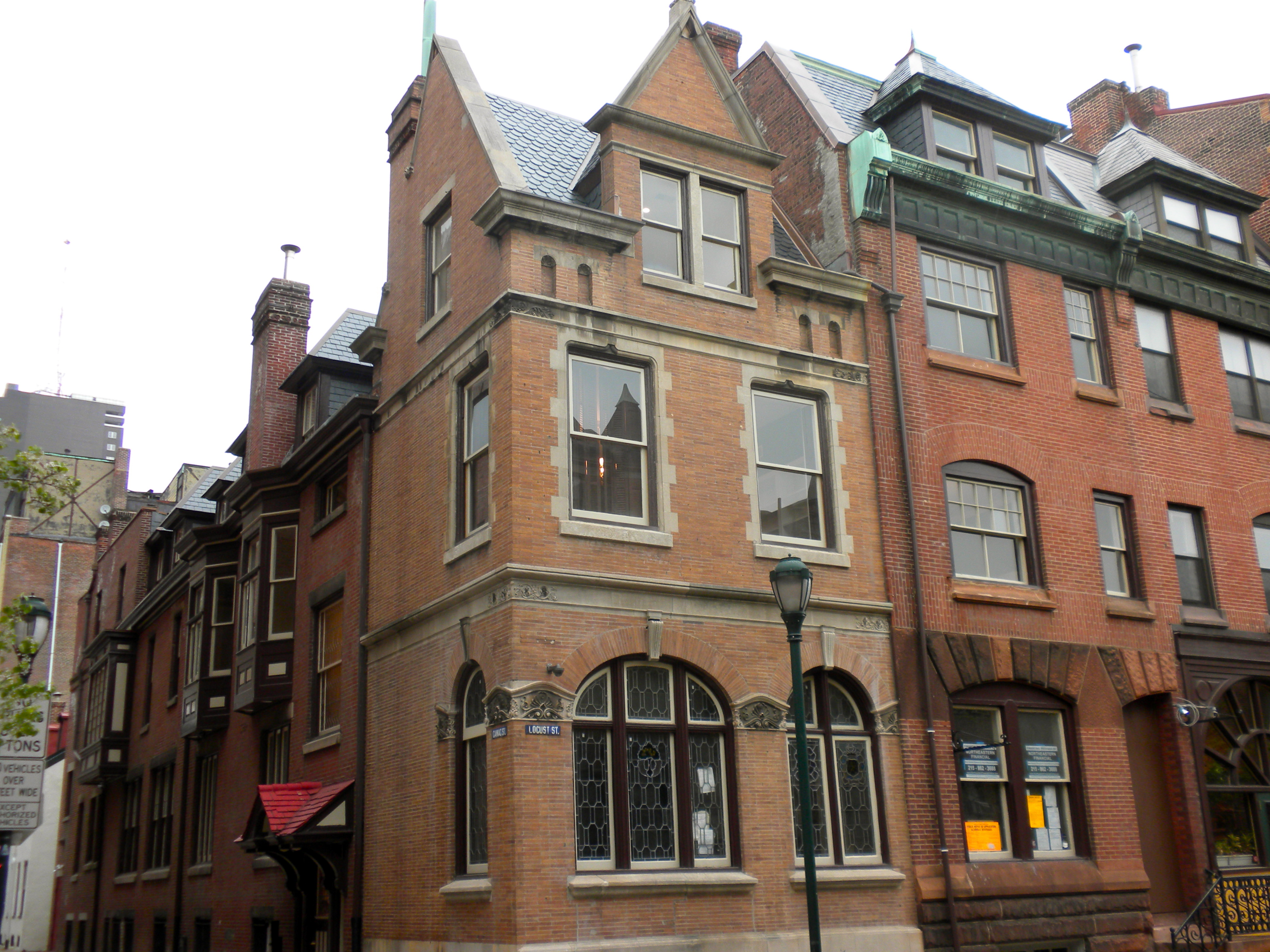
- Frank Furness designed the corner house at 1223 Locust Street

- Location within Philadelphia Location within Pennsylvania Location within the United States
- Location: 1221--1223 Locust Street, Philadelphia, Pennsylvania
- Coordinates: 39°56′52″N 75°9′43″W
- Area: 0.3 acres (0.12 ha)
- Built: 1891
- Architect: Frank Furness (1223); Lindley Johnson (1221)
- Architectural style: Colonial Revival, Late Gothic Revival
- NRHP reference No.: 80003617
- Added to NRHP: December 04, 1980

The Princeton Club is a pair of historic buildings located at 1221 and 1223 Locust Street in Philadelphia, Pennsylvania.

== History ==
=== Princeton Club of Philadelphia ===
The Princeton Club of Philadelphia was founded in 1868, and was housed in five other buildings before moving to Locust Street. According to its 1912 Yearbook, the club served "to foster good fellowship among Princeton University men; and also to provide a suitable place for Alumni meetings, smokers, etc."

=== Buildings ===
The building at 1223 was designed by architect Frank Furness; the building at 1221 is believed to have been partly designed by architect Lindley Johnson. They were built in the 1890s.

In 1910, the Princeton Club of Philadelphia moved into the buildings, making alterations in 1915 and 1919 to join the buildings together. They left the buildings sometime in the 1970s.

In 2022, it was reported that the owner of the building was Tiger Building LP. Larry Krasner, District Attorney of Philadelphia, held a 40 percent stake in the Tiger Building limited partnership.

The restaurant Deux Cheminées occupied the buildings from 1988 to 2007. Since 2011, the property has been occupied by the restaurant Vedge.

== See also ==
- National Register of Historic Places listings in Center City, Philadelphia
