= My Loup =

French restaurant in Philadelphia, Pennsylvania, U.S.

Coordinates: 39°57′2.5″N 75°10′26.5″W

- Interactive map of My Loup

Restaurant information
- Established: May 2023
- Owners: Alex Kemp; Amanda Shulman
- Head chef: Alex Kemp; Amanda Shulman
- Food type: French; Québécois
- Location: 2005 Walnut St, Philadelphia, Pennsylvania, 19103, United States
- Website: www.myloupphl.com

My Loup is a French restaurant with Québécois inspiration in Rittenhouse Square, Philadelphia, Pennsylvania. Established in May 2023, the business was included in The New York Times's 2023 list of the 50 best restaurants in the United States. It was also named one of twelve best new restaurants in the nation by Eater, and was a semifinalist in the Best New Restaurant category of the James Beard Foundation Awards in 2024. My Loup was named of the twenty best new restaurants of 2024 by Bon Appétit.

The chef-owners of My Loup, Alex Kemp and Amanda Shulman, are married. Shulman is also the sole chef-owner of the Michelin-starred Her Place Supper Club, also in Rittenhouse Square.

== See also ==
- List of French restaurants
