= Goldie (restaurant) =

Israeli restaurant in Philadelphia

- Interactive map of Goldie

Restaurant information
- Owner: Michael Solomonov
- Head chef: Caitlin McMillan
- Food type: Vegan Israeli cuisine
- Location: Philadelphia, Pennsylvania
- Coordinates: 39.9512°N 75.1726°W
- Website: www.goldiefalafel.com

Goldie is a Philadelphia based chain restaurant serving vegan Israeli food. The restaurant was created and is currently owned by Michael Solomonov under the restaurant group CookNSolo, which also owns the Philadelphia-based restaurants K'far, Federal Donuts, Jaffa Bar, Laser Wolf and Zahav. The restaurant's venue "Lilah" is named after the Hebrew word for night. The restaurant serves food that is kosher and vegan, including falafel dishes and tehini shakes. The restaurant's head chef is Caitlin McMillan.

== Operations ==
The restaurant maintains multiple locations in Philadelphia. Another location was opened in Google's New York City campus in 2024, serving exclusively employees of Google.

=== 2023 protests ===
More than 400 people attended protests outside of Goldie's restaurants after the restaurant fired three staff members for expressing pro-Palestinian sentiment following the 2023 Hamas-led attack on Israel, either by wearing Palestinian flag pins or by expressing support for Palestine on social media. The firing was accompanied by a post on social media by the restaurant's owner, Michael Solomonov, announcing that 100% of his restaurants' profits on October 12, 2023 would go to supplying aid and medical assistance to the Israel Defense Forces. At least $100,000 was raised for the Friends of United Hatzalah, affiliated with the IDF. The Philly Palestine Coalition called for a boycott of Solomon's restaurants. Governor Josh Shapiro condemned the protest, as did President Biden and other political officials, stating that the chant was antisemitic for having targeted a restaurant owned by an Israeli-Jewish owner.
