= Zahav =

Israeli restaurant in Philadelphia, Pennsylvania, U.S.

- Interactive map of Zahav

Restaurant information
- Established: May 3, 2008
- Owners: Steven Cook; Michael Solomonov
- Head chef: Michael Solomonov
- Food type: Israeli; Jewish
- Dress code: Casual
- Rating: Gayot: 14/20
- Location: 237 St James Place, Philadelphia, Pennsylvania, 19106, United States
- Coordinates: 39°56′47″N 75°08′43″W
- Reservations: Recommended
- Website: www.zahavrestaurant.com

Zahav (Hebrew: זהב, romanized: zahav, lit. 'gold') is an Israeli restaurant in Philadelphia founded in 2008. It is managed by head chef Michael Solomonov.

== History ==
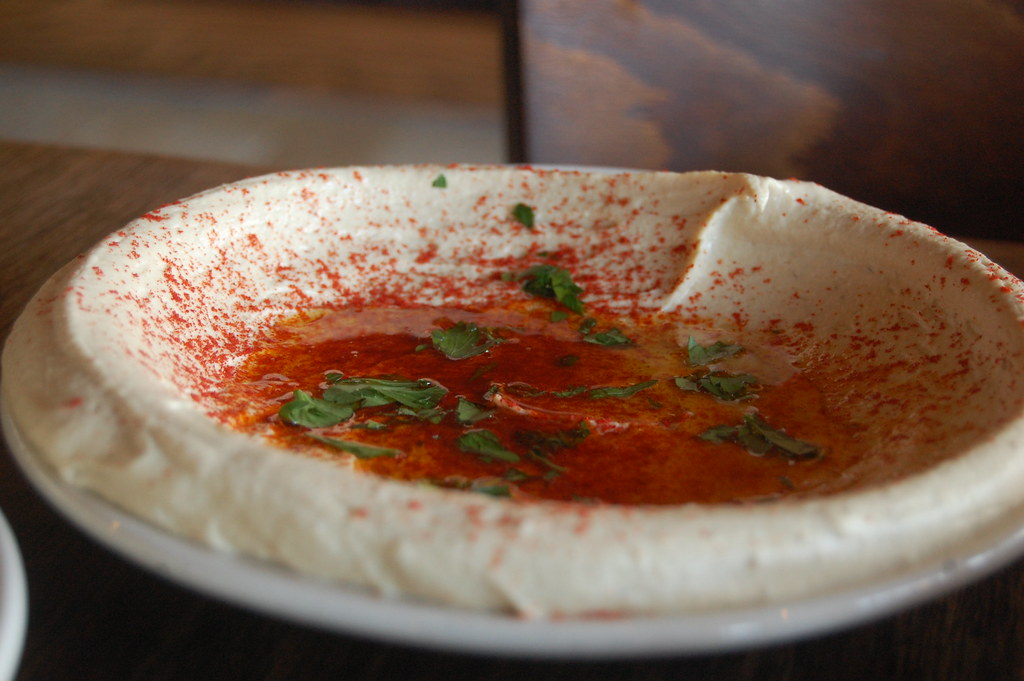
Solomonov's preparation of hummus, which he dubbed "hummus tehina", served at Zahav.

Zahav received the James Beard Foundation Award for Outstanding Restaurant in 2019 and was listed as one of the 100 Best Wine Restaurants in the United States by Wine Enthusiast in 2015.

Zahav's pomegranate lamb shoulder with chickpeas is regarded as the restaurant's signature dish. It was created in 2006 and is loosely based on another signature dish, the bossam from David Chang's Momofuku Ssam Bar.

== See also ==
- List of restaurants in Philadelphia
