= List of Michelin-starred restaurants in northeastern cities of the United States =

As of the 2025 Michelin guide, there are 121 restaurants in cities in the northeastern United States with a Michelin-star rating. Michelin classifies the region as comprising Boston, Chicago, New York City, Philadelphia, and Washington, D.C..

The Michelin Guides have been published by the French tire company Michelin since 1900. They were designed as a guide to tell drivers about eateries they recommended to visit and to subtly sponsor their tires, by encouraging drivers to use their cars more and therefore need to replace the tires as they wore out. Over time, the stars that were given out started to become more valuable.

Multiple anonymous Michelin inspectors visit the restaurants several times. They rate the restaurants on five criteria: "quality of products", "mastery of flavor and cooking techniques", "the personality of the chef represented in the dining experience", "value for money", and "consistency between inspectors' visits". Inspectors have at least ten years of expertise and create a list of popular restaurants supported by media reports, reviews, and diner popularity. If they reach a consensus, Michelin awards restaurants from one to three stars based on its evaluation methodology: One star means "high-quality cooking, worth a stop", two stars signify "excellent cooking, worth a detour", and three stars denote "exceptional cuisine, worth a special journey". The stars are not permanent and restaurants are constantly being re-evaluated. If the criteria are not met, the restaurant will lose its stars.

Michelin first began assessing restaurants in the region with a guide for New York City that debuted in 2007, followed by standalone lists for Chicago (2011) and Washington, D.C. (2017), all updated annually. Beginning in 2023, Michelin held a joint ceremony to announce the yearly updates for all three cities, while still considering them distinct lists. In May 2025, Michelin announced its expansion to begin assessing restaurants in Boston and Philadelphia, combining lists for all five cities into one titled MICHELIN Guide Northeast Cities. Despite the title, the guide’s geographic scope does not align with the official definition of the Northeastern United States, as Chicago and Washington, D.C. are not part of that region.

The debut American Northeast Cities guide was announced in Philadelphia on November 18, 2025.

== Boston ==
As of the 2025 Michelin Guide, there is one restaurant in Boston with a Michelin star rating, holding one star.

Key
| 1 Michelin star | One Michelin star |

Michelin-starred restaurants
| Name | Cuisine | Location | 2025 |
|---|---|---|---|
| 311 Omakase | Japanese | Boston – South End | 1 Michelin star |
| Reference | | | |

== Philadelphia ==
As of the 2025 Michelin Guide, there are three restaurants in Philadelphia with a Michelin star rating, all holding one star.

Key
| 1 Michelin star | One Michelin star |

Michelin-starred restaurants
| Name | Cuisine | Location | 2025 |
|---|---|---|---|
| Friday Saturday Sunday | Contemporary | Philadelphia – Center City | 1 Michelin star |
| Her Place Supper Club | French | Philadelphia – Center City | 1 Michelin star |
| Provenance | French | Philadelphia – Center City | 1 Michelin star |
| Reference | | | |

== See also ==
- List of restaurants in Boston
- List of restaurants in New York City
- List of restaurants in Philadelphia
