= Michael Solomonov =

American and Israeli chef and restaurateur (born 1978)

Michael Solomonov מייקל סולומונוב
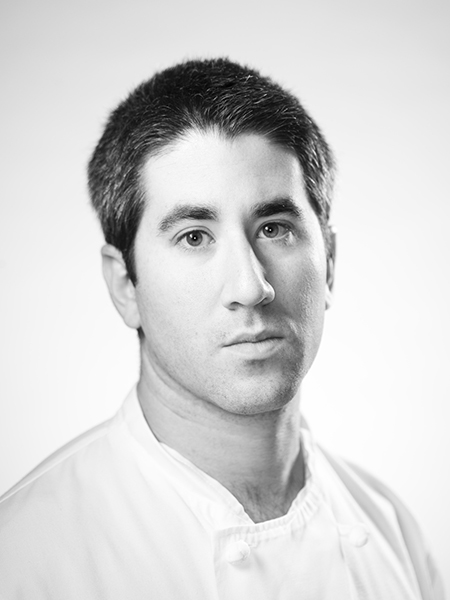
- Michael Solomonov in 2006
- Born: 1978 (age 47–48); Ganei Yehuda, Israel
- Education: Florida Culinary Institute
- Culinary career
- Cooking style: Israeli, Jewish
- Current restaurants
- Zahav; Federal Donuts; Abe Fisher; Dizengoff; Goldie; K'Far; Merkaz; Laser Wolf; Jaffa Bar; Aviv
- Awards
- James Beard Foundation Award – Mid-Atlantic Chef 2011
- Website: http://www.cooknsolo.com/

Michael Solomonov (Hebrew: מייקל סולומונוב; born 1978) is an American and Israeli chef and restauranteur owner active primarily in Philadelphia. His first restaurant Zahav, founded in 2008, has received national recognition including the James Beard Foundation "Outstanding Restaurant" in 2019.

== Early life ==
Solomonov was born in moshav Ganei Yehuda, Israel, to a family of Bulgarian-Jewish descent. He was raised in Pittsburgh, where he attended Taylor Allderdice High School. At the age of 18, he returned to Israel with no Hebrew language skills, taking the only job he could get – working in a bakery – and his culinary career was born.

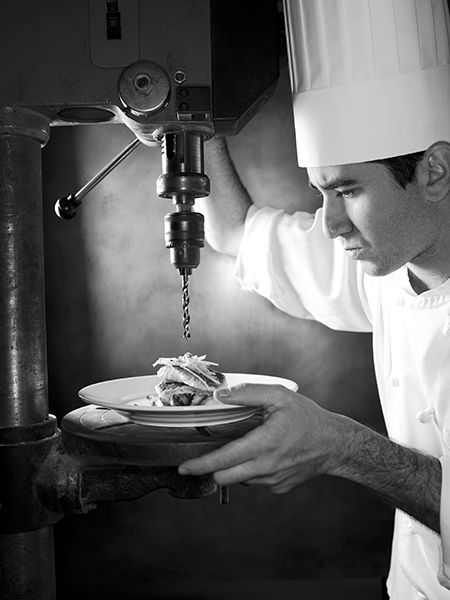
Michael Solomonov posing for Philadelphia Magazine in 2006

== Career ==
At the start of his career, Solomonov moved back to the United States to attend culinary school at the Florida Culinary Institute in West Palm Beach. He then moved to Philadelphia, Pennsylvania to cook Italian cuisine at Chef Marc Vetri's upscale Italian restaurants. Afterwards, Solomonov took a job as a chef at Marigold Kitchen, owned by businessman Steve Cook. Cook and Solomonov then opened the upscale Mexican restaurant Xochitl and later co-founded the restaurant group CooknSolo.

In 2003, while patrolling the Israeli border with Lebanon near Metulla, his brother David was ambushed and shot to death by Hezbollah snipers on the Lebanese side on Yom Kippur. It was only three days before David’s release date from the Israeli army, after three years of mandatory military service. David was not supposed to be on duty that day, but he volunteered to replace a fellow soldier who wanted to go to synagogue for Yom Kippur; he was 21 years old. David's death was one of the main factors that influenced him to change his focus to Israeli and Jewish cuisine. With the support of an investment banker turned chef Steve Cook, Solomonov opened Zahav in 2008.

With his business partner Steven Cook, Solomonov is co-owner of several Philadelphia restaurants: Dizengoff, vegan falafel restaurant Goldie, Laser Wolf, Abe Fisher, Percy Street Barbecue, and Federal Donuts, a fried chicken and donut chain. Having participated in the South Beach Food & Wine Festival in 2013, Solomonov was able to bring Percy Street Barbecue to South Florida. Bill Addison, writing for Eater Philadelphia, called Chef Solomonov "the Genius of Modern Jewish Cooking" after eating at Abe Fisher, Dizengoff, and Zahav.

Solomonov also spent a period of time consulting for David Magerman's, now closed, and Citron and Rose, a certified Kosher meat restaurant on the Main Line in Bala Cynwyd, Pennsylvania.

In 2015, Cook and Solomonov published a cookbook based on their restaurant Zahav. Zahav: A World of Israeli Cuisine was nominated for a James Beard Foundation Book Award in the International cookbook category. Its recipe for hummus was chosen as "2015 dish of the year" by Bon Appétit.

In 2025, Solomonov and his partner Steve Cook launched Aviv, an Israeli fusion restaurant, in Miami Beach, Florida. They also launched their Zahav hummus into national retail stores, including Whole Foods and Target.

== Awards ==
- "Best Chef: Mid-Atlantic" (2011) by the James Beard Foundation
- "Cookbook of the Year" for Zahav: A World of Israeli Cooking (2016) by the James Beard Foundation
- "Outstanding Chef" (2017) by the James Beard Foundation
- "Outstanding Restaurant" for Zahav (2019) by the James Beard Foundation
- "The Restaurant List" for Laser Wolf (2021), one of 50 restaurants included by The New York Times
