= Vietnam Restaurant =

Restaurant in Philadelphia, Pennsylvania, U.S.

- Interactive map of Vietnam Restaurant

Restaurant information
- Established: 1984
- Owner: Benny Lai
- Head chef: Benny Lai
- Food type: Vietnamese
- Location: 221 North 11th Street, Philadelphia, Philadelphia, Pennsylvania, 19107, United States
- Coordinates: 39°57′23″N 75°09′26″W
- Seating capacity: 80 guests
- Other locations: 2
- Website: eatatvietnam.com

Vietnam Restaurant is a restaurant in Philadelphia, Pennsylvania, United States. Established in 1984, the restaurant was named an "America's Classic" by the James Beard Foundation in 2024.

== See also ==
- List of James Beard America's Classics
- List of restaurants in Philadelphia
