= Machine Shop (bakery) =

Bakery in Philadelphia, Pennsylvania, U.S.

- Interactive map of Machine Shop

Restaurant information
- Location: 1901 S 9th St, Philadelphia, Pennsylvania, 19148, United States
- Coordinates: 39.9249°N 75.1601°W
- Website: machineshopphilly.com

Machine Shop Boulangerie, or simply Machine Shop, is a bakery in Philadelphia, Pennsylvania, United States.

== Description ==
The French bakery operates on the first floor of the Bok Building in South Philadelphia.

== History ==
The bakery operates as a pop-up restaurant, before moving into a brick and mortar shop in 2022.

== Reception ==
In 2024, the business was included in The New York Times list of the 22 best bakeries in the U.S.

== See also ==
- List of bakeries
- List of restaurants in Philadelphia
