= Mish Mish (restaurant) =

- Interactive map of Mish Mish

Restaurant information
- Established: February 18, 2022
- Owner: Alex Tewfik
- Head chef: Zev Flores
- Food type: Mediterranean
- Location: 1046 Tasker Street, Philadelphia, Philadelphia County, Pennsylvania, 19148, United States of America
- Coordinates: 39.929654°N 75.163015°W
- Seating capacity: 32
- Reservations: https://widgets.resy.com/#/venues/58359
- Website: mishmishphilly.com

Mish Mish is a Mediterranean restaurant along the border between the Passyunk Square and East Passyunk Crossing neighborhoods in Philadelphia, Pennsylvania, United States.

It serves what has been described "Modern Mediterranean" cuisine, including Levantine cuisine. The restaurant was founded by the former food editor of Philadelphia Magazine, Alex Tewfik, in 2022, opening on February 18. The restaurant's name is Arabic for "apricot" (hence the over-sized apricot hanging above its front door).

== Awards and accolades ==
- 2022: Best New Restaurants, The Infatuation, Philadelphia
- 2023: Listed in the Michelin Green Guide for Philadelphia
- 2025: Number 33 on Philly Mag's "50 Best Restaurants in Philadelphia"
- 2025: On June 16, 2025, the New York Times named Mish Mish as one of three restaurants (along with River Twice and Gabriella's Vietnam) in the Passyunk Square neighborhood on its overall list of "The Best Restaurants in Philadelphia Right Now".
