= Honeysuckle Provisions =

Restaurant in Philadelphia, Pennsylvania, U.S.

- Interactive map of Honeysuckle Provisions

Restaurant information
- Location: 310 South 48th Street, Philadelphia, Pennsylvania, 19143, United States
- Coordinates: 39°57′11″N 75°13′06″W

Honeysuckle Provisions was a restaurant in Philadelphia, Pennsylvania. It was named one of twelve best new restaurants in the United States by Eater in 2023.

It closed in October 2024, with the owners planning to open a new restaurant at a different location.

== See also ==
- List of restaurants in Philadelphia
