= Dalessandro's Steaks =

Restaurant in Philadelphia, Pennsylvania, U.S.

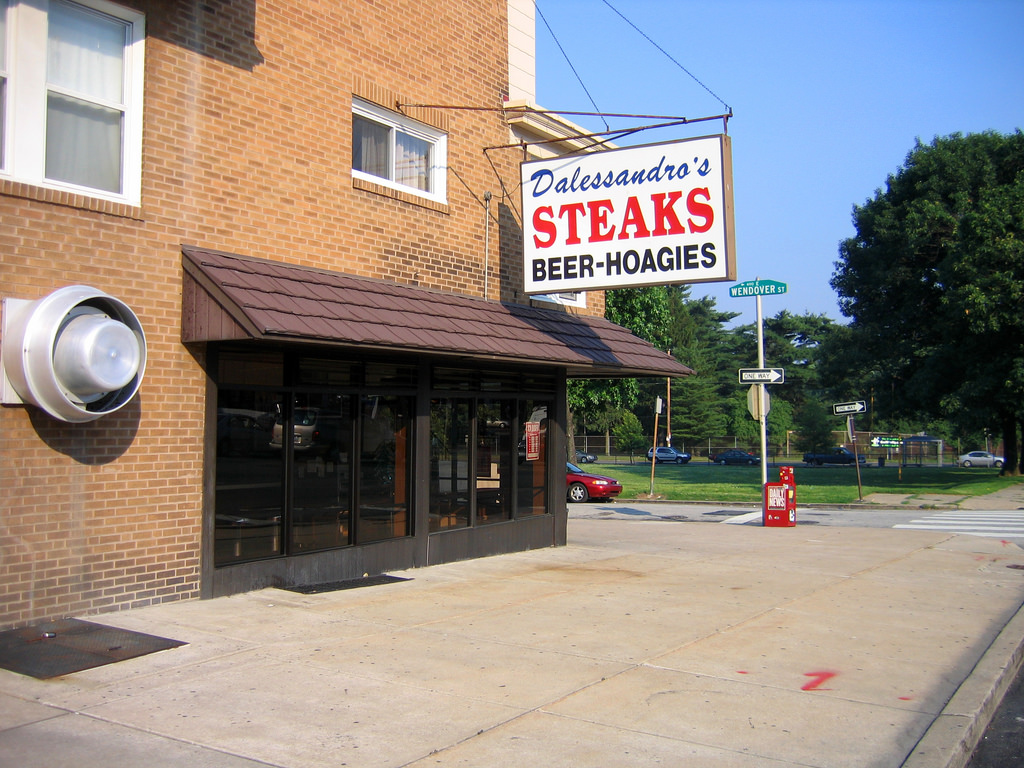
- Dalessandro's Steaks' store front
- Interactive map of Dalessandro's Steaks

Restaurant information
- Established: 1960; 66 years ago
- Owners: Steve Kotridis; Margie Kotridis
- Previous owner: William Dalessandro
- Food type: Cheesesteaks and other sandwiches
- Dress code: Casual
- Location: 600 Wendover St, Philadelphia, Philadelphia, Pennsylvania, 19128
- Coordinates: 40°1′46.3″N 75°12′21.6″W
- Website: www.dalessandros.com

Dalessandro's Steaks & Hoagies is a cheesesteak restaurant that was founded in 1960 in Roxborough, Philadelphia, Pennsylvania, United States. In 2011, when referring to Dalessandro's, The New York Times declared that "Philly food could be summed up by those cheese steaks".

== History ==
Italian American William Dalessandro opened Dalessandro's in 1960 on Ridge Avenue in Roxborough. In 1961, the restaurant moved to its current location at Henry Avenue and Wendover Street. In 2009, former food cart operator Steve Kotridis and his wife, Margie, bought the business from the Dalessandro family.

In June 2016, the restaurant received national publicity when Tonight Show host Jimmy Fallon, a known Dalessandro's fan, served future Philadelphia 76ers #1 draft pick Ben Simmons a Dalessandro's cheesesteak on the show.

== Reception ==
In 2014, Niki Achitoff-Gray and Ed Levine of Serious Eats applauded Dalessandro's meat as the "real prize".

In 2016, the restaurant finished runner-up to Jim's Steaks’ South Street location in Philadelphia Business Journal's poll for best cheesesteak in the region.

In July 2017, U.S. News & World Report named Dalessandro's as having one of the top five cheesesteaks in Philadelphia.

== Gallery ==
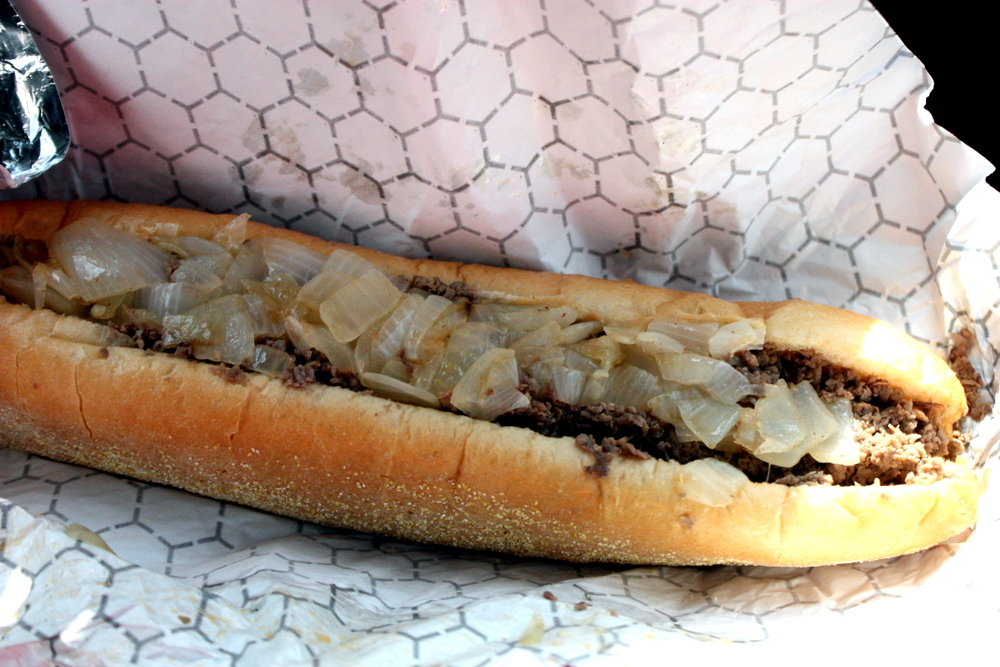
A Dalessandro's cheesesteak sandwich

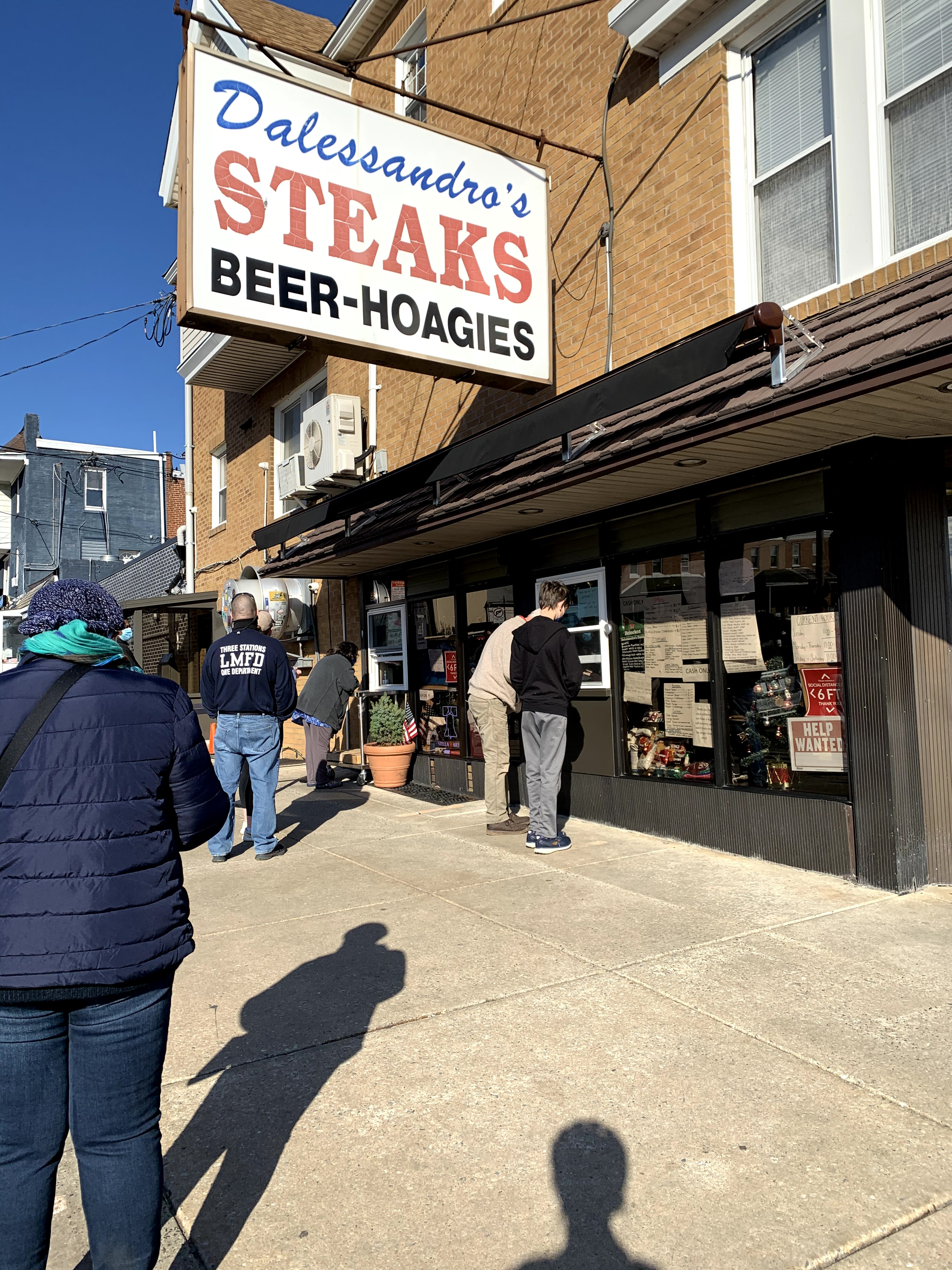
Dalessandro's Steaks order window during the COVID-19 pandemic

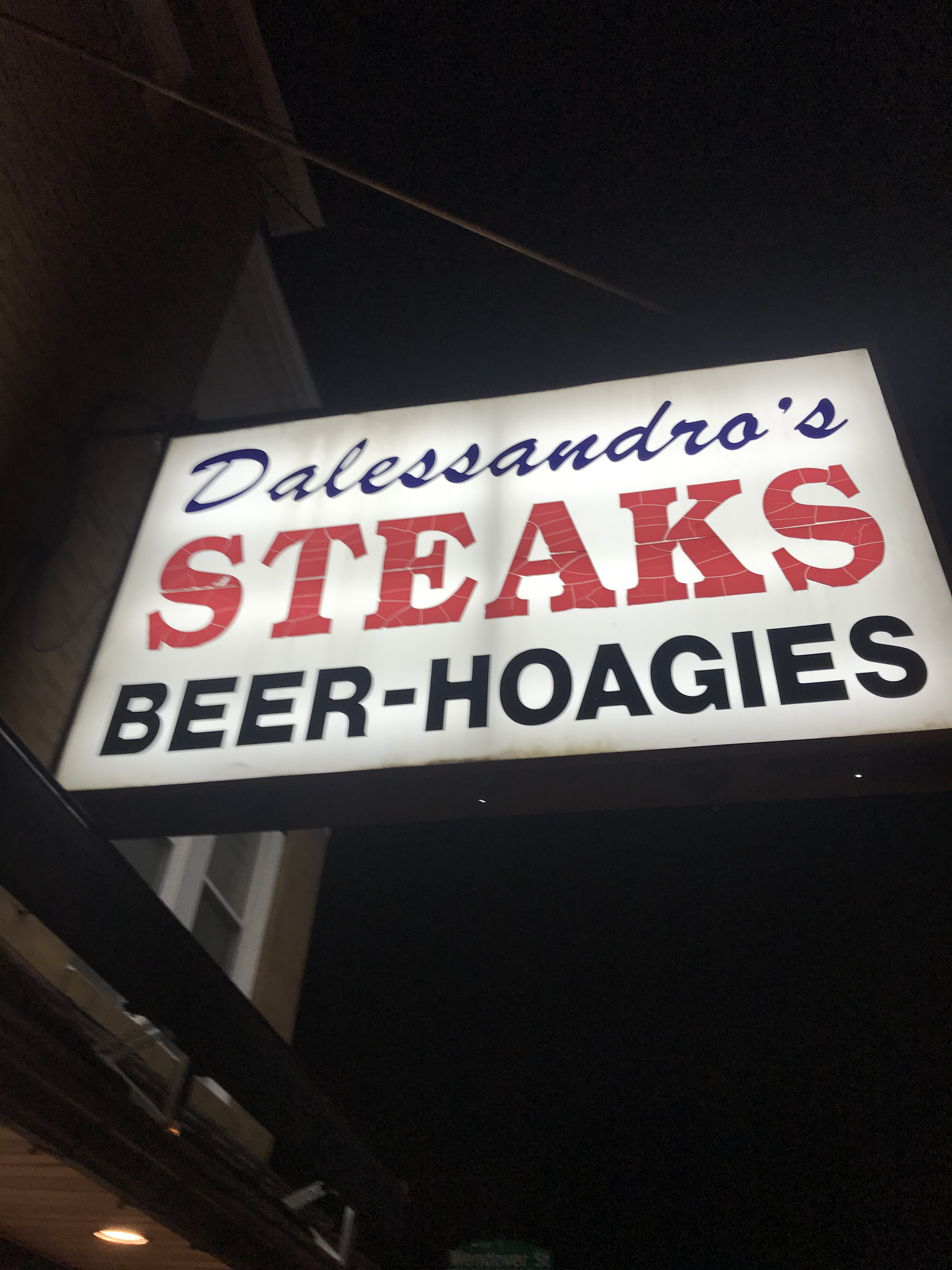
Dalessandro's Steaks sign photographed at night

== See also ==
- List of submarine sandwich restaurants
- List of Michelin Bib Gourmand restaurants in the United States
