= Vedge =

Vegan restaurant in Philadelphia, Pennsylvania, US

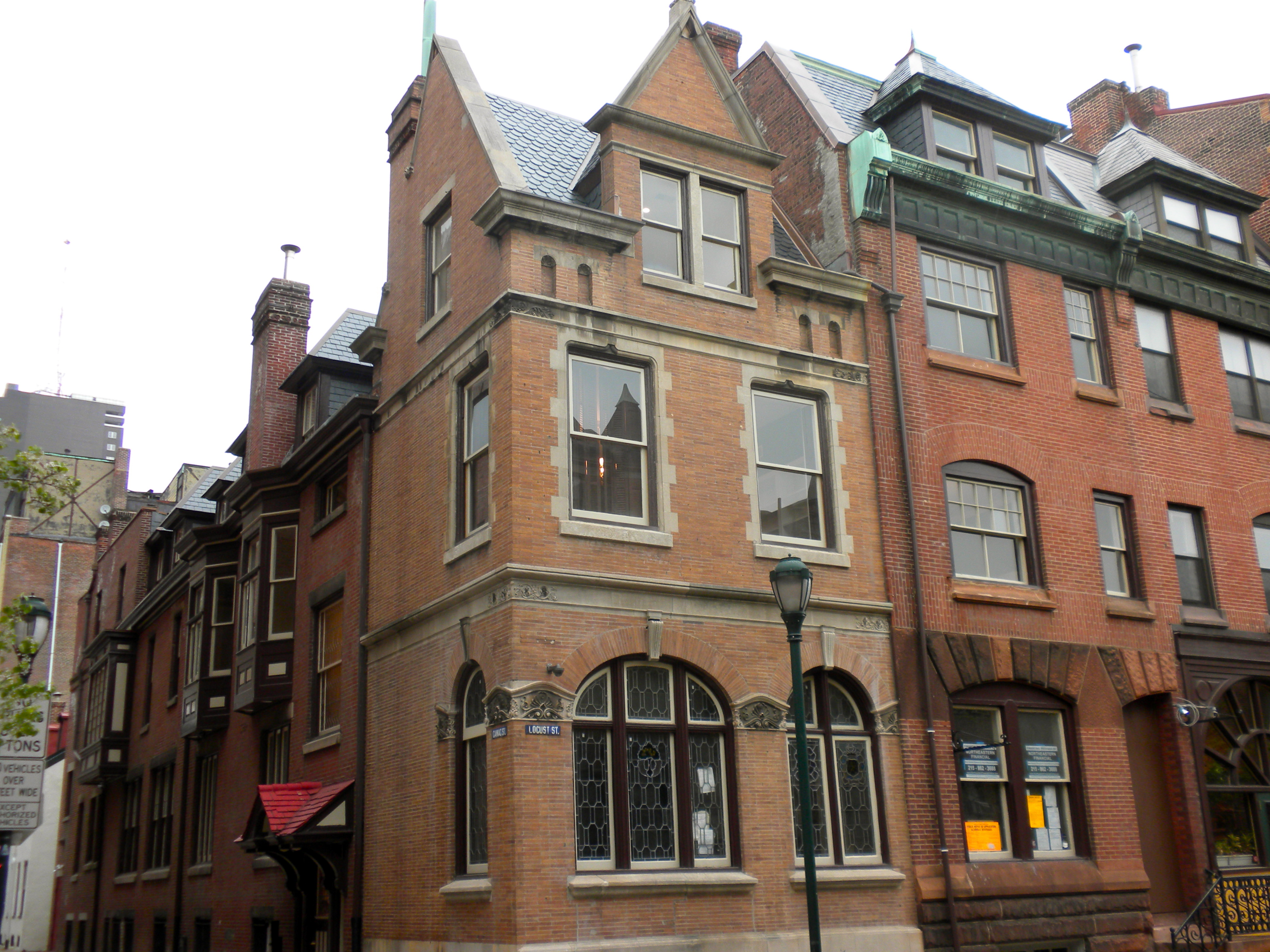
- Vedge is housed in the Princeton Club.
- Interactive map of Vedge

Restaurant information
- Established: 2011
- Owners: Kate Jacoby, Rich Landau
- Food type: vegan
- Location: 1221 Locust St, Philadelphia, Pennsylvania, 19107, United States
- Coordinates: 39.9479°N 75.1613°W
- Website: vedgerestaurant.com

Vedge is a fine-dining vegan restaurant located in the Washington Square West neighborhood of Philadelphia, Pennsylvania. In 2018, Food & Wine named them one of the 40 most important restaurants of the previous 40 years.

== History ==
Vedge was opened in 2011 by Kate Jacoby and Rich Landau, both of whom are natives of Philadelphia and James Beard Award nominees. The restaurant is housed in the Princeton Club, a building on the National Register of Historic Places in the Midtown Village/Gayborhood area of Philadelphia.

== Food ==
Philadelphia magazine called the food "deceptively vegan" and Financial Times, "unexpectedly bold." VisitPhilly.com describes the food as "moving away from the 'protein at the center of the plate' model" and instead focusing on vegetables.

The word "vegan" does not appear on the menu, which chef Richard Landau called "a conscious decision," saying he wanted Vedge to be judged against the best restaurants in Philadelphia rather than against other vegetarian restaurants. Vedge has their seitan custom-formulated by a local artisan producer. Bitters and shrubs are house-made. Bon Appetit called the dessert selections "seriously interesting." The Philadelphia Inquirer called their wine offerings a "standout global list."

== Reception ==
Bon Appétit said "Vedge may be a 'vegan' restaurant to some, but to us it's just a great place to eat, full stop." The New York Times Robert Draper called the experience an "epic vegan meal—a phrase I never expected to write in my lifetime." Food & Wine described their flavors as "incredible". Shape named them one of the top 10 upscale vegan restaurants in the United States. Food Network named them one of the top 20 vegan restaurants in the United States.

In 2019, Big 7 Travel named Vedge one of 50 best vegan-friendly restaurants in the world.

In 2018, Food & Wine included them in a list of the 40 most important restaurants of the past 40 years and said they had pioneered and invigorated modern vegan dining, and USA Today named them one of the 10 best vegan restaurants in the country.

In 2017, Tasting Table named them one of the 8 best vegan restaurants in the U.S., The Daily Meal named them one of the best vegan restaurants in the country, and they were Zagat's highest-rated restaurant in Philadelphia.

In 2016, Wine Enthusiast named them one of the 100 best wine restaurants in the U.S. and called them "perhaps the country's best vegan restaurant."

In 2015, Vedge was named one of the six best fine-dining vegan restaurants in the U.S. by PETA and BuzzFeed named them one of 24 "bucket list" vegan restaurants.

In 2014, the restaurant was one of five in Philadelphia profiled by London Times food critic Giles Coren on BBC America's Million Dollar Critic and Relish named them one of the 15 best vegan and vegetarian restaurants in the U.S.

In 2013, Gentlemen's Quarterly named them one of the 12 outstanding restaurants of the year and Travel + Leisure named them one of the best vegetarian restaurants in the U.S.

In 2023, the Financial Times named Vedge to its list of the best vegan restaurants in the world.

=== Criticism ===
Edward Behr of the Financial Times said the cooking did not "show a strong thread of style."

== See also ==
- List of vegetarian and vegan restaurants
