= Yoav Cohen =

Israeli windsurfer

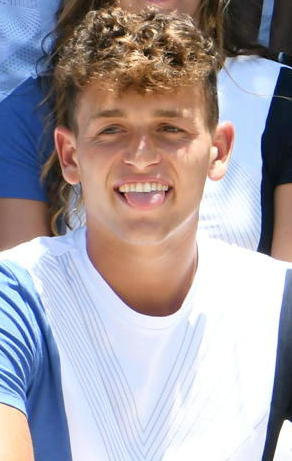

Personal information
- Nationality: Israeli
- Born: יואב כהן; 30 August 1999 (age 27) Ganei Yehuda, Israel

Sailing career
- Sport: Sailing
- Club: Sdot Yam Sailing Club
- Class: RS:X

Achievements and titles
- Olympic finals: 4th (2021)
- World finals: 5th (2021)
- Regional finals: (gold) (2020)
Medal record
Men's Windsurfing
Representing Israel
European Championships
Gold medal – first place	2020 Vilamoura	RS:X
- Updated on 13 August 2021

Yoav Cohen (Hebrew: יואב כהן; born 30 August 1999) is an Israeli windsurfer. In 2020 he won the RS:X European Championships, and In 2021 he represented Israel at the 2020 Summer Olympics and finished 4th in Men's RS:X.

== Biography ==
His parents are Hananel and Isabel. Cohen was born in Ganei Yehuda, Israel, where until he was two years old his family lived in a trailer. He and his family then lived in kibbutz Kadima, and then in Caesarea, Israel.

His sailing club is Sdot Yam Sailing Club.

== Events ==
=== Olympics ===
In 2021, Cohen represented Israel at the 2020 Summer Olympics and finished 4th in Men's RS:X event.

=== Worlds ===
In 2013, at age 13, Cohen won the Under 15 Techno 293 World Championships in Sopot, Poland.

Cohen was the 2017 youth world champion, after winning the 47th Youth Sailing World Championships in Sanya, China.

He finished 5th at the 2021 RS:X World Championships in Cádiz, Spain.

=== Others ===
He won the 2018 Medemblik Regatta (formerly Delta Lloyd Regatta) in Medemblik, the Netherlands.

Cohen won the gold medal at the 2020 RS:X European Championships in Vilamoura, Portugal.

== See also ==
- List of European Championships medalists in sailing
- List of Jews in sports
