= Federal Donuts =

Fast food chain

Federal Donuts & Chicken

Restaurant information
- Established: 2011
- Food type: Fast food; Doughnuts
- Location: Philadelphia
- Website: www.federaldonuts.com

Federal Donuts is an American fast food chain serving donuts, coffee, and fried chicken. The chain is based in Philadelphia, and is owned by Michael Solomonov.

== History ==
The founders were inspired to open the restaurant by Philadelphia-based Cafe Soho, which serves Korean fried chicken. The first location was opened in Pennsport in 2011, and As of 2018, the company has six locations, in addition to stands in Citizens Bank Park. A Miami branch opened in 2017 and closed in 2018.

In 2024, the chain relocated its flagship location from 1219 South 2nd Street to 22 Wolf Street in South Philadelphia (next to 2300 Arena).

== Menu ==
Locations serve donuts, chicken, and coffee. Founder Tom Henneman has referred to these three items as "...the three comforts". The restaurant introduced a breakfast sandwich in 2019. In 2022, the restaurant switched from serving bone-in chicken to boneless chicken tenders in its fried-chicken combo.

The restaurant has collaborated on foods with other Philadelphia-based companies, including Pizza Brain and Little Baby's Ice Cream.
