= Friday Saturday Sunday =

Restaurant in Philadelphia, Pennsylvania, U.S.

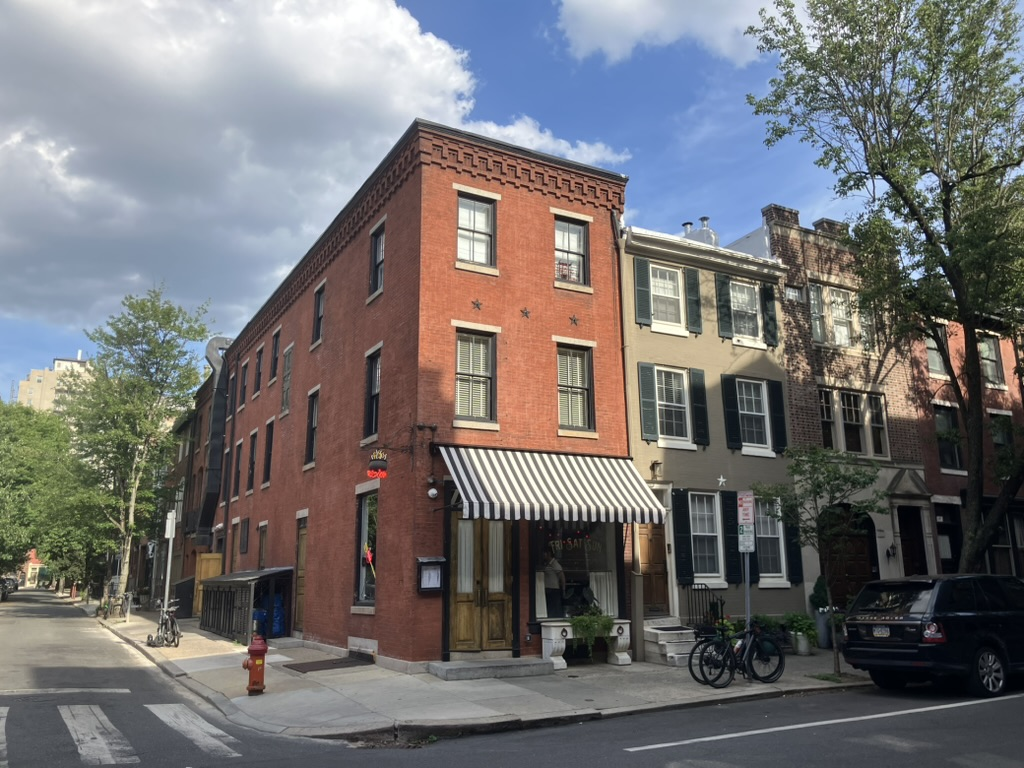
- Friday Saturday Sunday's exterior in June, 2026
- Interactive map of Friday Saturday Sunday

Restaurant information
- Established: April 1973; 53 years ago
- Owners: Chad Williams; Hanna Williams
- Previous owner: Weaver Lilley
- Head chef: Chad Williams
- Food type: Eclectic American
- Rating: (Michelin Guide)
- Location: 261 S 21st Street, Philadelphia, Pennsylvania, 19103, United States
- Coordinates: 39°56′56″N 75°10′34″W
- Seating capacity: 53
- Reservations: Recommended
- Website: www.fridaysaturdaysunday.com

Friday Saturday Sunday is a restaurant in Rittenhouse Square, Philadelphia. In 2023, the business won in the Outstanding Restaurant category of the James Beard Foundation Awards.

The New York Times included the restaurant on its list of the best restaurants in Philadelphia in 2023. In November 2025, it was one of the first three restaurants in Philadelphia to earn a Michelin star.

== See also ==
- List of Michelin-starred restaurants in American Northeast Cities
- List of restaurants in Philadelphia
