= Steve's Prince of Steaks =

Restaurant in Pennsylvania, United States

Coordinates: 40.045621°N 75.060919°W

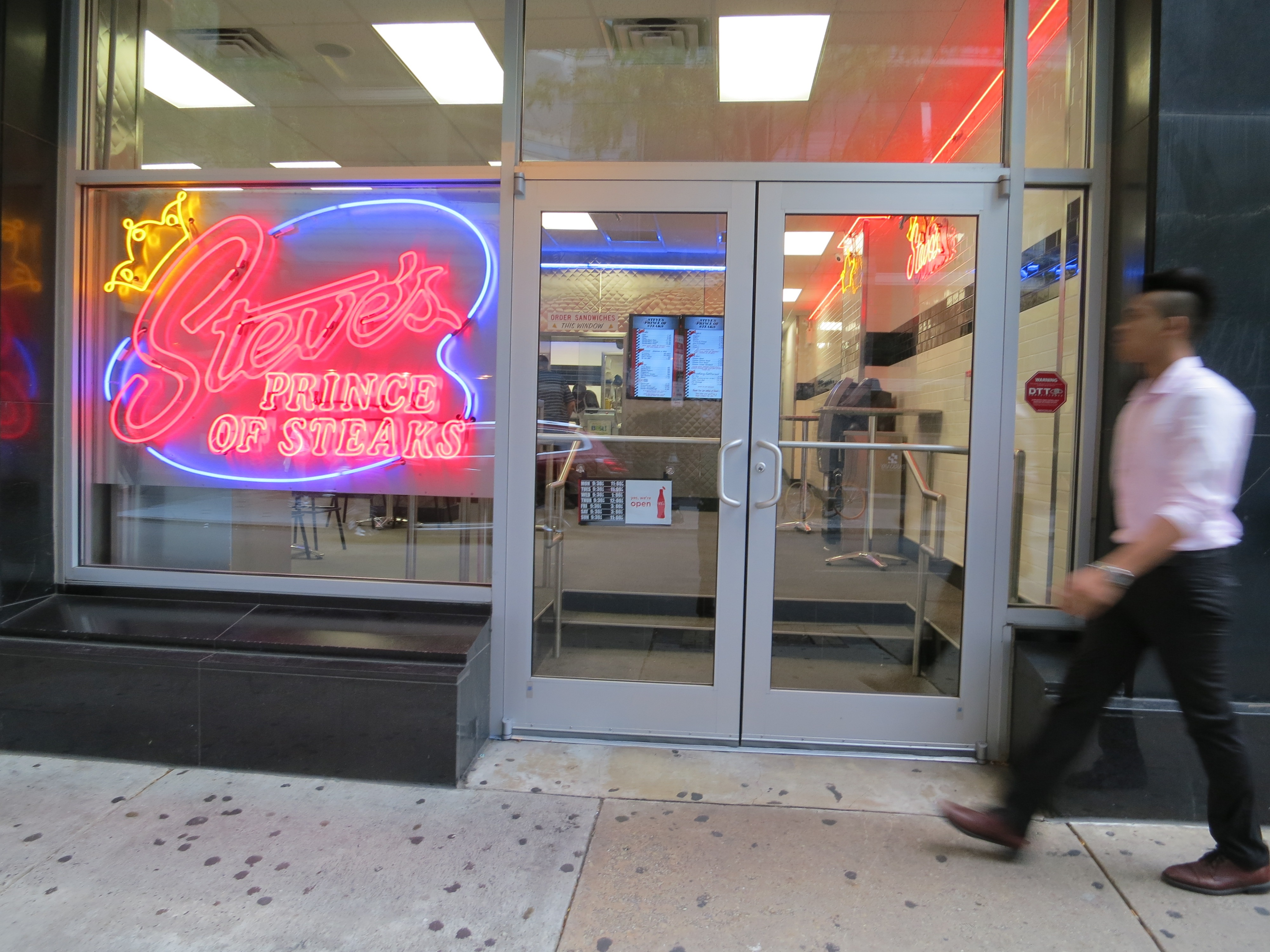
- The former Steve's Prince Of Steaks in Center City Philadelphia.
- Interactive map of Steve's Prince of Steaks

Restaurant information
- Established: 1980; 46 years ago
- Owner: Steve Iliescu
- Food type: Cheesesteaks and other sandwiches
- Dress code: Casual
- Location: 7200 Bustleton Ave (flagship location), Philadelphia, United States, Pennsylvania, 19149
- Website: www.stevesprinceofsteaks.com

Steve's Prince of Steaks is a cheesesteak eatery that was founded in 1980 on Bustleton Ave in the Oxford Circle section of Northeast Philadelphia. The eatery has since expanded to three additional locations and is popular among locals. The eatery is known for its melted American cheese and does not chop the meat.

== History ==
Steve's Prince of Steaks was established in 1980 by Steven Iliescu. In 2015, the Steve's along with Amoroso's Bakery broke the world record for longest cheesesteak creating a sandwich measuring approximately 480 ft (146.3 m), overtaking the previous world record set in 2011 of 426 ft (129.8 m).

In 2013, Steve's expanded to Center City, Philadelphia.

== Ratings ==
The eatery is a popular favorite among Philadelphia residents and has received mostly positive reviews from food critics. Philadelphia Magazine awarded Steve's Prince of Steaks best cheesesteak in Philadelphia in 1992 and 2007. Liz Clayton of Serious Eats described the Steve's cheesesteaks as "a relationship that works". Philadelphia Magazine food critic Arthur Etchells, on the other hand, described the cheesesteak at the Center City location to be "nearly flat" and "overcooked".

Los Angeles Dodgers pitcher David Price tweeted that the cheesesteak eatery "changed his life".

== See also ==
- List of submarine sandwich restaurants
