= Jim's South Street =

Restaurant in Philadelphia, Pennsylvania, United States

Coordinates: 39.94156°N 75.14926°W

Jim's South St.

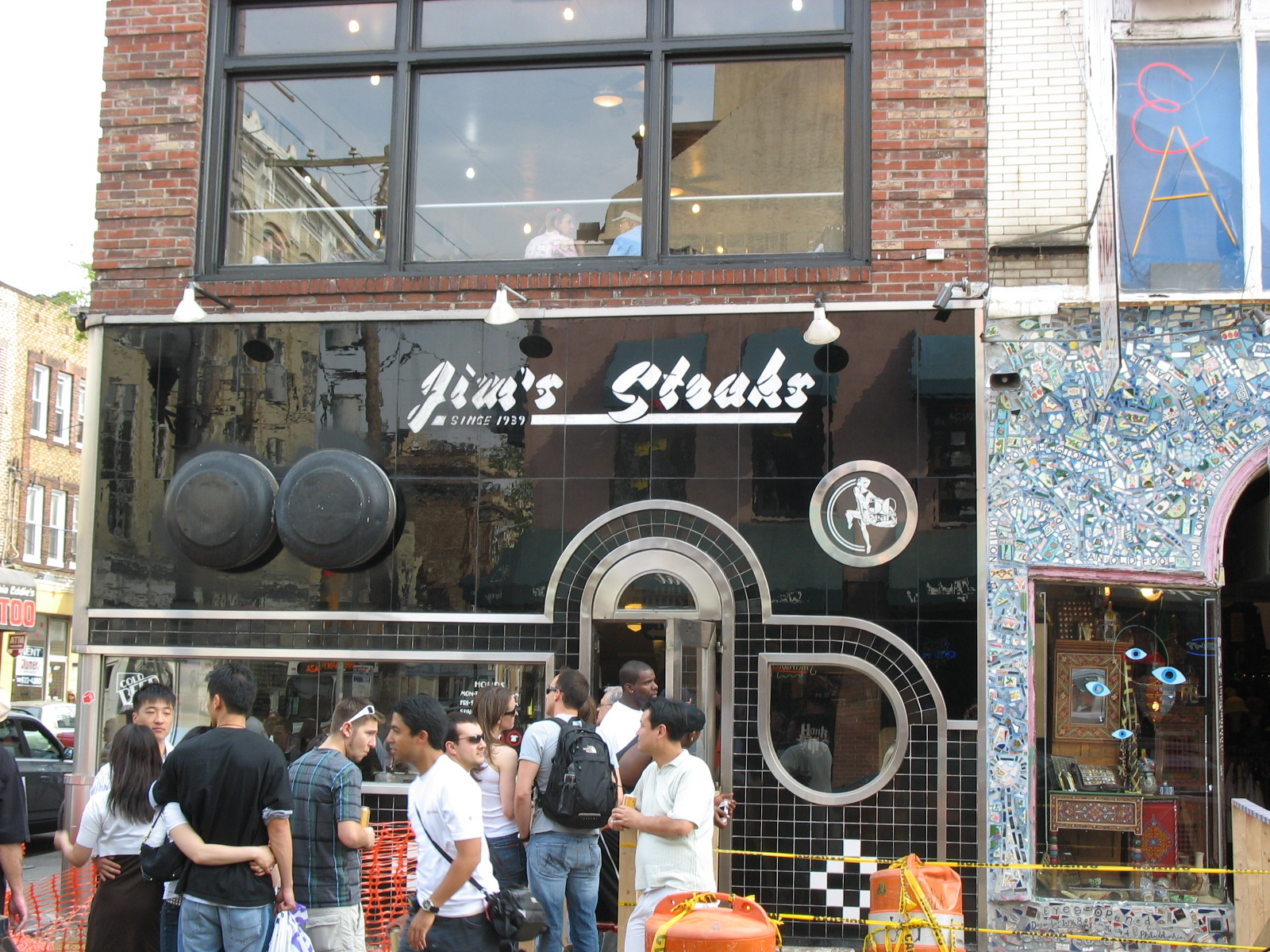
- Jim's South St's logo
- Interactive map of Jim's South St.

Restaurant information
- Established: July 5, 1976; 50 years ago
- Owner: Ken Silver
- Previous owners: William Proetto; Abner Silver
- Food type: North American cuisine
- Location: 400 South St, Philadelphia, Pennsylvania, 19147, United States
- Website: jimssouthstreet.com

Jim's South St., formerly a part of the Jim's Steaks franchise, is a Philadelphia restaurant located on South Street specializing in cheesesteaks. The original restaurant chain known as Jim's Steaks was founded in West Philadelphia in 1939, however in 2011 ownership of the location on South Street changed and was later renamed to Jim's South St.

== Founding ==
In the 1930s, "Jim and Millie" offered sandwiches from their house in West Philadelphia. In 1939, they converted the house into what would become Jim's Steaks. William Proetto and his brother, Tom, purchased the West Philadelphia location in 1966. In 1976, Proetto and Abner Silver opened its second location on South Street.

== History ==
Abner Silver took sole ownership of Jim's Steaks on South Street in 2011 after Proetto death. Abner Silver's owned the South Street location until his death from complications of Alzheimer's disease in 2015. Ownership of Jim's Steak on South Street was passed to his son, Kenneth Silver. The name of the South Street location was later renamed to Jim's South Street.

In 2014, while in town for the opening of Ride Along, Kevin Hart and Ice Cube gave away cheesesteaks at Jim's South Street.

In 2016, NJ.com named Jim's South Street as one of the 10 Philadelphia cheesesteak shops that are worth a visit. Jim's was selected based on winning a series of polls of the readers of the Philadelphia Business Journal.

Ken Silver feared the COVID-19 pandemic would change the cheesesteak business forever. After reopening after a 2-month lockdown, crowds were smaller, but better than what Silver expected.

In the morning of July 29, 2022, a fire, caused by downed wires, was reported at Jim's South Street. Firefighters were met with smoke and backup was called. Silver said the fire was most likely caused by a malfunctioning HVAC system. Silver plans to rebuild Jim's saying "I owe it to my father’s legacy. I owe it to the street and I owe it to Philadelphia. We are too important a business to go away and I truly view it that way." Reconstruction of this location was originally planned for completion in 2023, but was then delayed into 2024 due to the complexity of also expanding next door, into space inside 402 South Street. Jim's Steaks reopened to the public on the week of April 28, 2024.

== See also ==
- List of submarine sandwich restaurants
