= Provenance (restaurant) =

Restaurant in Philadelphia, Pennsylvania, U.S.

- Interactive map of Provenance

Restaurant information
- Established: August 7, 2024; 2 years ago
- Owner: Nicholas Bazik
- Head chef: Nicholas Bazik
- Food type: French; Korean
- Rating: (Michelin Guide)
- Location: 408 S 2nd Street, Philadelphia, Pennsylvania, 19147, United States
- Coordinates: 39°56′34″N 75°08′44″W
- Seating capacity: 25
- Reservations: Recommended
- Website: provenancephl.com

Provenance is a Michelin-starred restaurant in Society Hill, Philadelphia, Pennsylvania, United States.

The seating capacity is 25 people.

== See also ==
- List of Michelin-starred restaurants in American Northeast Cities
- List of restaurants in Philadelphia
