= River Twice =

Modern American Restaurant in Philadelphia, Pennsylvania, U.S.

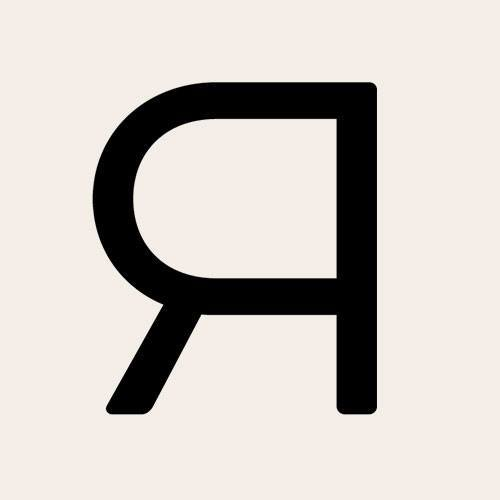
- Interactive map of River Twice

Restaurant information
- Location: 1601 E. Passyunk Ave., Philadelphia, Pennsylvania, 19148, United States
- Coordinates: 39°55′47″N 75°09′48″W

River Twice is a restaurant in Philadelphia, Pennsylvania, United States.

== Awards and accolades ==
On June 16, 2025, the New York Times named River Twice as one of three restaurants (along with Mish Mish and Gabriella's Vietnam) in the Passyunk Square neighborhood on its overall list of "The Best Restaurants in Philadelphia Right Now".
