= Jim's Steaks =

Restaurant in Philadelphia, Pennsylvania, United States

Restaurant information
- Established: 1939; 87 years ago
- Owner: Proetto family (two locations)
- Previous owners: Jim and Millie Pearlingi
- Food type: North American cuisine
- Location: 431 North 62nd Street, West Philadelphia, Pennsylvania, 19151, United States
- Other locations: 469 Baltimore Pike Springfield, Pennsylvania, 19064
- Website: www.jimssteaks.com

Jim's Steaks is a Philadelphia restaurant specializing in cheesesteaks, founded in 1939 on North 62nd Street in Haddington, West Philadelphia. Jim's Steaks currently has two locations, the original in West Philadelphia and another in Springfield, Pennsylvania. Jim's Steaks owned the restaurant on South Street until 2011.

== History ==
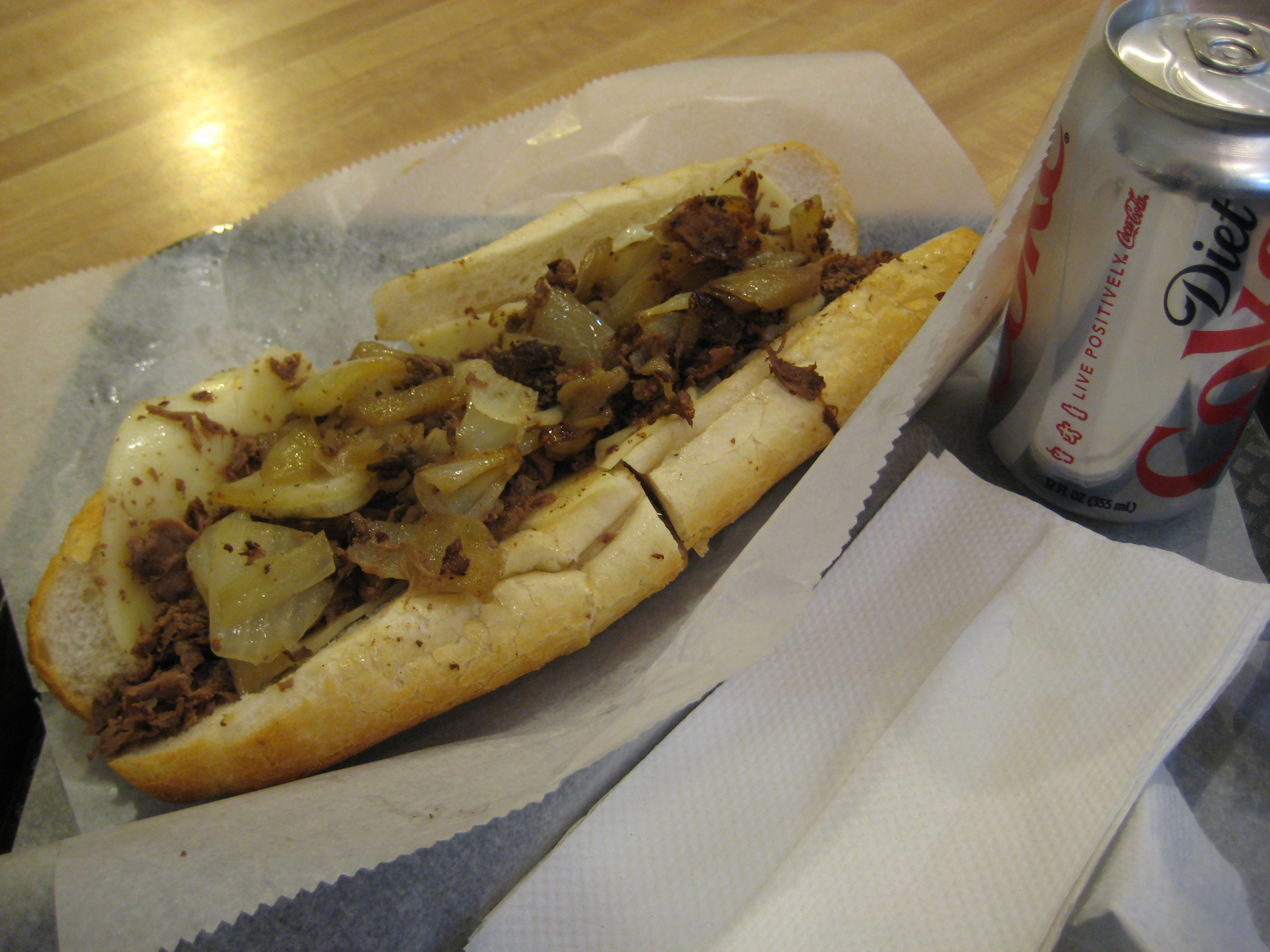
A cheesesteak from Jim's Steaks

In the 1930s, "Jim and Millie" Pearlingi offered sandwiches from their house in West Philadelphia. In 1939, they converted the house into what became Jim's Steaks. In 1966, William Proetto and his brother, Tom, purchased the restaurant. In 1976, Proetto and Abner Silver opened a second location on South Street. In 1996, a third location was opened in Northeast Philadelphia, but was shut down in July 2017 due to health code violations. A fourth location was opened in 1999 in Springfield, Pennsylvania.

In 2011, Silver took sole ownership the South Street location after Proetto's death. The name of Jim's Steaks on South Street was later changed to Jim's South Street. Jim's Steaks currently operates two locations. The location in Springfield is open while the original West Philadelphia location is temporarily closed for renovations.

== Description ==
Philadelphia magazine's food blog Foobooz listed the Springfield location as one of the "31 Cheesesteaks to Eat Before You Die", describing the restaurant as "black-and-white tile, polished stainless, beef steaming on the grill".

== See also ==
- List of submarine sandwich restaurants
