= Pizza Brain =

American museum and pizzeria

Pizza Brain Museum of Pizza Culture
- Company type: Private
- Industry: Retail
- Founded: Philadelphia, Pennsylvania (2011)
- Founder: Brian Dwyer; Joseph Hunter; Michael Carter; Ryan Anderson
- Headquarters: Philadelphia, Pennsylvania, United States
- Products: Pizza
- Parent: Brian Dwyer, Michael Carter
- Website: www.pizzabrain.org

Pizza Brain was a pizza culture museum and pizzeria based in Pennsylvania. It was home to the world's largest collection of pizza memorabilia and collectibles. Pizza Brain’s headquarters was in the Kensington neighborhood of Philadelphia. In 2024, Pizza Brain closed.

== History ==
In May 2010, Kensington-based artist Brian Dwyer, along with Christopher Powell, organized "Give Pizza Chance"—Philadelphia's first pizza-based art show—in which pizza was served as the muse for more than 25 artists who displayed their work at a local gallery.

In October 2010, Dwyer met Carter at Circle of Hope's (a local church) annual mapping meeting. Dwyer shared his enthusiasm for collecting pizza-related objects with Carter. Carter's background led him to suggest the idea of presenting the items in a museum format.

In late Fall 2010, Joe Hunter, a pizza chef from South Carolina, joined Carter and Dwyer. By January 2011, a master carpenter, Ryan Anderson, helped to identify a pair of buildings in the Fishtown section of Philadelphia in which to locate their project.

Hunter started working on Pizza Brain’s pizzas and flavor profiles. Carter provided curatorial direction to Dwyer’s collection and developed the business’ model, determining its long-term focus on social media. Anderson made use of reclaimed and found materials in his design. Together, they curated the world's largest collection of pizza related items, earning them a Guinness World Record by Summer 2011.

On September 7, 2012, Pizza Brain opened its doors to the public and became known as the "world's first pizza museum".

In May 2024, Pizza Brain announced closure of the famed museum and restaurant amidst an unresolved dispute with its landlord over deteriorated property conditions. The subsequent decline in foot traffic in combination with other location constraints proved insurmountable to remain open.,

== Guinness World Record ==
In preparation for the opening of Pizza Brain, Carter and Dwyer submitted their collection to be adjudicated by Guinness World Record. On July 31, 2011, Guinness World Records certified the collection releasing certificates under both Pizza Brain's and Dwyer's name as "the world's largest collection of pizza-related items"; they cited 561 different items, from all over the world, collected since 2010.

== Pre-open press ==
A number of additional articles followed the creation of the Museum of Pizza Culture as it gained notoriety, including articles from Zagat, The Huffington Post, The Philadelphia Inquirer, Fox News, Food Network Magazine, Metro, Laughing Squid, and the magazine for Australia's national airline Qantas.

NPR's All Things Considered also covered the story, as well as TV outlets like NBC 10, and Good Morning Sacramento.

In September 2012, The New York Times, Associated Press, Condé Nast Traveler, USA Today, TIME, BBC Travel and The Guardian all profiled Pizza Brain during its opening month, garnering further national and international attention.

On September 26, 2012, CBS This Morning aired a nationally televised news feature on the museum/restaurant, resulting in Pizza Brain being selected as a topic of discussion on Jeopardy!'s Twitter account.

== Pizza awards & accolades post open ==
Pizza Brain earned its first foodie award before it opened. Though he is not a pizza maker, the Guinness record and enthusiasm for its grand opening led to partner Dwyer being the honorific title of "Phoodie of the Year" from Philebrity.com.

Post-opening, under the direction of head chef Joe Hunter, Pizza Brain has established itself as one of Philadelphia's best pizza shops, including earning 3 "Best of Philly" Awards from Philadelphia Magazine. It has received local, national, and international recognition.

Notable awards, reviews, and lists include: 3 Philadelphia Magazine "Best of Philly" awards, Business Insider's Best Pizza in Every State, Zagat's 10 Killer Slices of Pizza in Philly, Nylon Magazine's 15 Best Pizza Slices in America, The Daily Meal's 10 Best Pepperoni Pizzas In America, Food Network's 50 Top Pizza Deliveries from Coast to Coast, The Daily Meal's 101 Best Pizzas in America for 2017, The Daily Meal's 101 Best Pizzas in America for 2018, The Daily Meal's The 101 Best Pizzas in America 2019, and The Infatuation's The Best Pizza Places In Philadelphia.

== See also ==
- List of pizza chains of the United States
