= Bella Vista, Philadelphia =

Neighborhood in Philadelphia, US

Bella Vista
- Neighborhood of Philadelphia
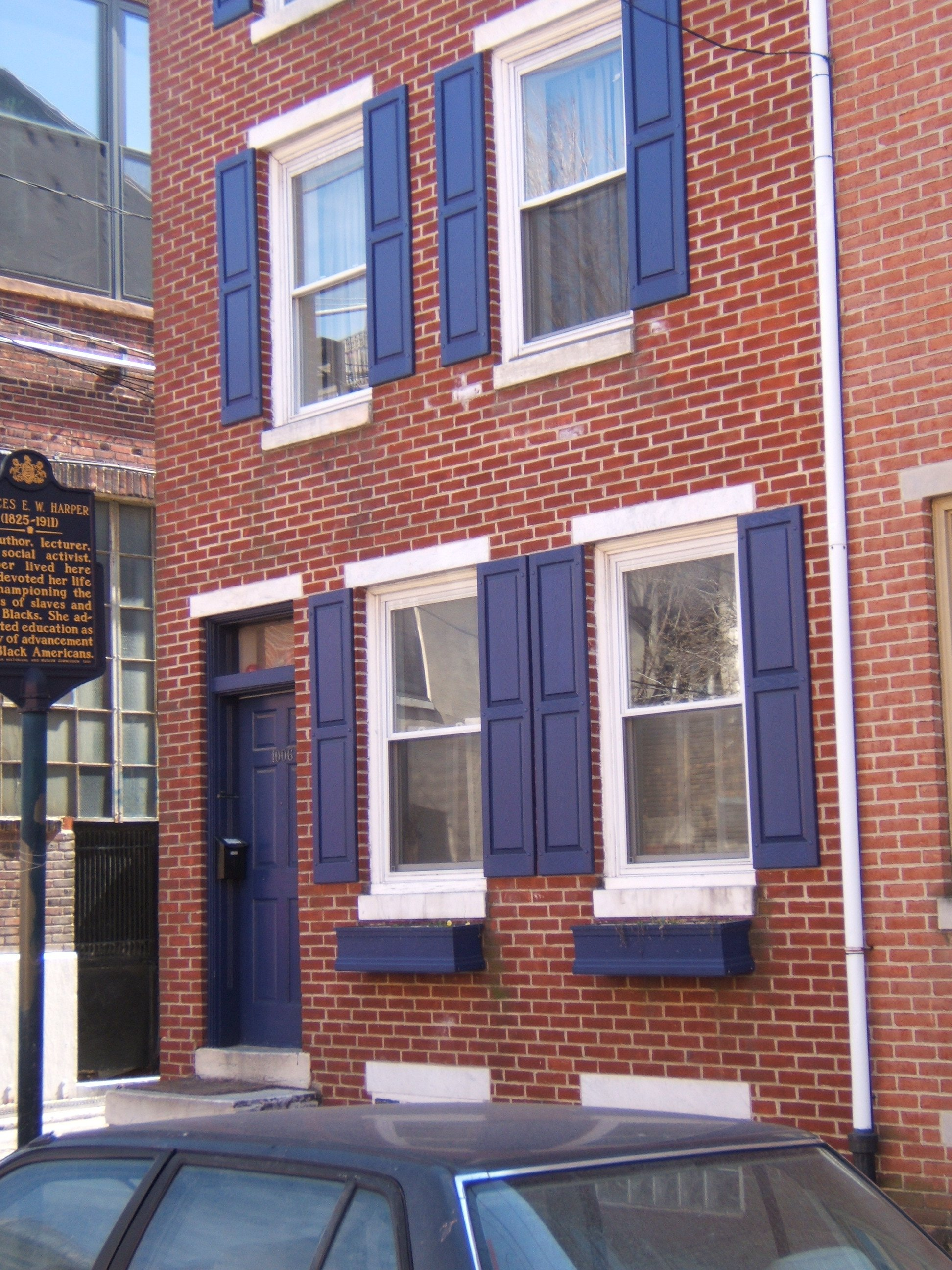
- Frances Ellen Watkins Harper House in the Bella Vista section of South Philadelphia

- Location within Philadelphia
- Country: United States
- State: Pennsylvania
- County: Philadelphia
- City: Philadelphia

Population (2010)
  - Total: 5,898
- ZIP code: 19147
- Area codes: 215, 267, 445

Bella Vista, Italian for "beautiful sight", is a neighborhood in the South Philadelphia section of Philadelphia, Pennsylvania, United States.

It is bounded by 6th Street, 11th Street, South Street and Washington Avenue. It currently has a population of 5,898.

== History ==
Prior to the Act of Consolidation of 1854, Bella Vista was part of the Moyamensing. It was sparsely settled until the 1840s and 1850s when it became an impoverished area on the outskirts of the industrializing city. The New York Tribune noted in 1848 that the districts of Moyamensing and nearby Southwark were composed of "the most graceless vagabonds and unmitigated ruffians" as well as "loafers" who were members of various gangs. In addition to Irish immigrants, it was also once home to a large portion of the city's population of African descent, many of whom were former slaves from the South. In 1852, the Institute for Colored Youth, a school (and later college) for people of African descent, was established at 10th and Bainbridge.

During the late 1800s, Italian immigrants began settling the area in large numbers, which reshaped the neighborhood's character. One of the earliest immigrants, Antonio Palumbo, opened a boardinghouse (Palumbo's) on the corner of 9th and Catharine in 1884 that became the social center of the neighborhood's growing Italian community.

The planned construction of the South Street Expressway in the 1960s led to a drop in property values in the neighborhood. Many of the neighborhood's residents subsequently moved to other areas of South Philly. As they did in adjacent Queen Village, developers and city planners attempted to rebrand the neighborhood and began referring to it as "Bella Vista" in the early 1970s.

The city eventually scrapped plans for the second cross-town expressway. In the late 1970s, the neighborhood began to gentrify due to its proximity to Center City. In 1982, it was featured as a case study in Michael Lang's Gentrification Amid Urban Decline: Strategies for America's Older Cities. During the same era, the neighborhood also experienced an influx of Vietnamese and Mexican immigrants, especially near Washington Ave. While much of the Italian-American community has moved deeper into South Philadelphia, i.e. further south of Bella Vista into neighborhoods such as Marconi Plaza, many Italian shops and restaurants still remain clustered along the Italian Market on 9th Street.

The Samuel S. Fleisher Art Memorial, Institute for Colored Youth, Frances Ellen Watkins Harper House, George W. Nebinger School, and Washington Avenue Historic District are listed on the National Register of Historic Places.

=== Historical markers ===
Bronze plaques installed in Bella Vista by the Pennsylvania Historical and Museum Commission that commemorate individuals, events, and landmarks.

Frank Gasparro (1909-2001) - Designer of the reverse side of the Lincoln Penny and, with Gilroy Roberts, the Kennedy half-dollar. Born and educated in classical art in Philadelphia, Gasparro was first employed as a junior engraver by the U.S. Mint in 1942. By 1965, he was appointed by President Lyndon Johnson as the 10th Chief Engraver. Designed numerous coins and medals, including the Eisenhower and Susan B. Anthony dollars. (727 Carpenter St. - 2002)

Frances E.W. Harper (1825-1911) - An author, lecturer, and social activist, Harper lived here and devoted her life to championing the rights of slaves and free Blacks. She advocated education as a way of advancement for Black Americans. (1006 Bainbridge St. - 1992)

House of Industry - Founded 1846, this was Pennsylvania's first such institution. Irish Catholics, other immigrants, and native-born were its constituency. Services to the needy included training programs for persons seeking work, designed to encourage their ultimate independence. (714 Catharine St. - 1991)

Institute for Colored Youth - Begun as a farm school, in 1852 it became one of the first schools to train Blacks for skilled trades and teaching. It gained recognition here under Fanny J. Coppin, principal, 1869–1902. Relocated, it later became Cheyney University. (915 Bainbridge St. - 1992)

St Mary Magdalen De Pazzi Parish - Founded in 1852 as the first Italian national parish in the U.S. by St. John N. Neumann, Bishop of Philadelphia. New churches were dedicated here in 1854 and 1891. The Delaware Valley's largest Italian community became centered in this neighborhood. (714 Montrose St. - 1994)

Joe Venuti (1903-1978) - "Father of Jazz Violin." Classically trained as a child, Venuti went to grade school here. He introduced new string techniques; worked with his close friend, guitarist Eddie Lang, 1921–33. Led own band, 1935–43; was on screen & radio. Major comeback in 1968. (northeast corner S. 8th & Fitzwater Sts. - 1997)

Giannini Family - Acclaimed operatic family. Father, tenor Ferruccio (1868-1948), sang on first disc, 1896. Daughter Dusolina (1900–86) was a Metropolitan Opera soprano. Son Vittorio (1903–66) was a composer and taught at Curtis Institute and Juilliard. Resided here. (735 Christian St. - 2005)

Christian Street Hospital - First Civil War U.S. Army Hospital, founded May, 1861. Here Drs. Mitchell, Keen, Morehouse, and others used electric current, drugs, and other experiments in pioneering treatment of nerve and related disorders. Closed 1865. (924 Christian St. - 2005)

Samuel S. Fleisher Art Memorial - Founded in 1898 as the Graphic Sketch Club; oldest free community art school in the United States. Nearly 5,000 students study art here annually. Alumni include Frank Gasparro, former chief engraver for U.S. Mint, and Louis Kahn, renowned architect. (719 Catharine St. - 2005)

South 9th Street Curb Market - One of several curb markets established in the early 20th century to counter high prices and food shortages during WWI. The 9th St. Market has survived despite anti-immigrant sentiments and criticisms regarding sanitary conditions and traffic congestion. Neighborhood businesses offered fresh produce and a variety of ethnic specialty foods. It has evolved from a local community market to become a popular Philadelphia icon. (northeast corner of 9th & Christian Sts. - 2007)

Engine Company No. 11 - One of 22 fire companies established under the Philadelphia Fire Department in 1871. In 1919, it became a segregated African American unit whose members distinguished themselves through professional service. Desegregated in 1952. (1016 South St. at Alder - 2005)

Octavius V. Catto (1839-1871) - An early graduate of the Institute for Colored Youth, Catto, who lived here, was an educator, Union army major, and political organizer. In 1871, he was assassinated by rioters while urging blacks to vote. His death was widely mourned. (812 South St. - 1992)

Robert M. Adger (1837-1910) - Businessman, activist, bibliophile lived here. Director, Philadelphia Building & Loan Assn., pioneering black firm. Amassed and donated a major collection of rare books, pamphlets on blacks, antislavery. Founded Afro-American Historical Society. (823 South St. at Darien St. - 1993)

Eddie Lang - "Father of Jazz Guitar." He was born Salvatore Massaro in 1902 and lived in this area as a boy. An accomplished soloist, Lang worked with Joe Venuti, Paul Whiteman, the Dorseys, and others. He was Bing Crosby's accompanist when death cut short Lang's career in 1933. (S. 7th St. just N. of Clymer St. - 1995)

Mario Lanza (1921-1959) - The beloved tenor was born here as Alfredo Cocozza. Here as a boy, he learned the arias of many operas and went on to become a radio, concert and record artist. After signing with M-G-M in 1947, Lanza made seven films; had the title role in "The Great Caruso," 1951. (634-636 Christian St. - 1993)

Henry L. Phillips (1847-1935) - Baptized a Catholic, reared a Moravian, and ordained an Episcopal priest, Phillips transformed the Church of the Crucifixion into a Black cultural center, known for its social outreach. He was a founder of the American Negro Historical Society. (620 S. 8th St. - 1993)

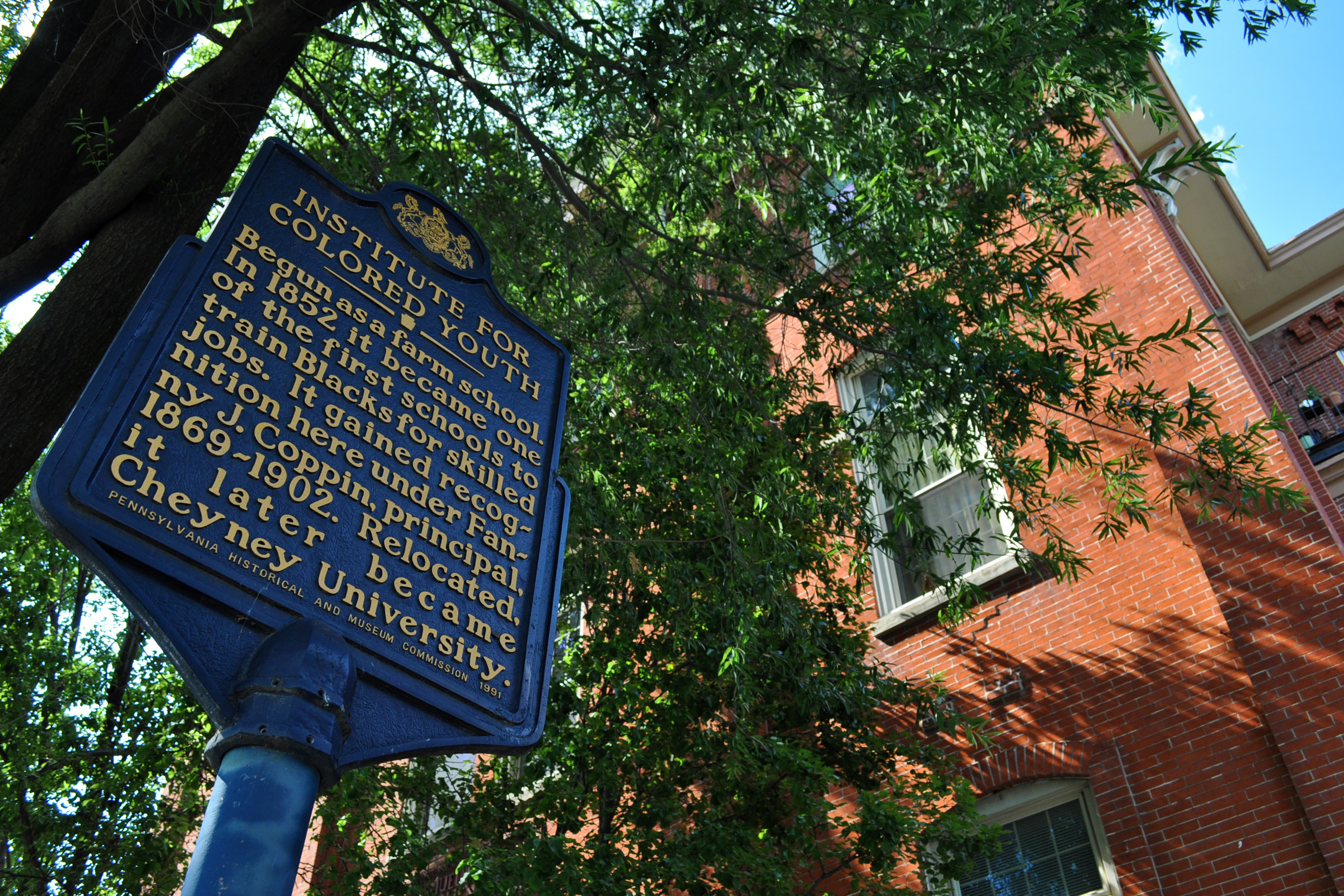
Institute for Colored Youth Building Historical Marker

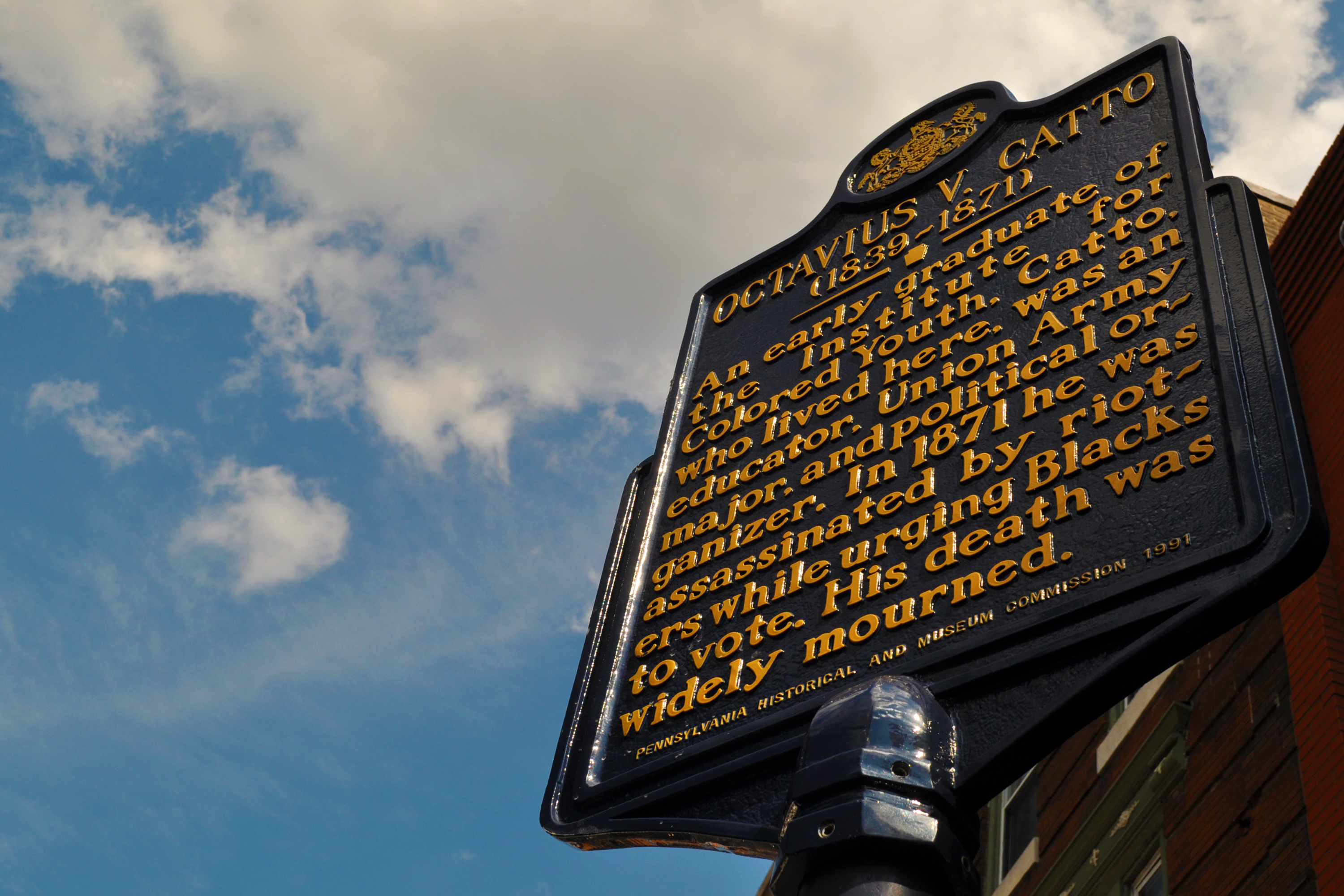
Octavius V Catto Home Historical Marker

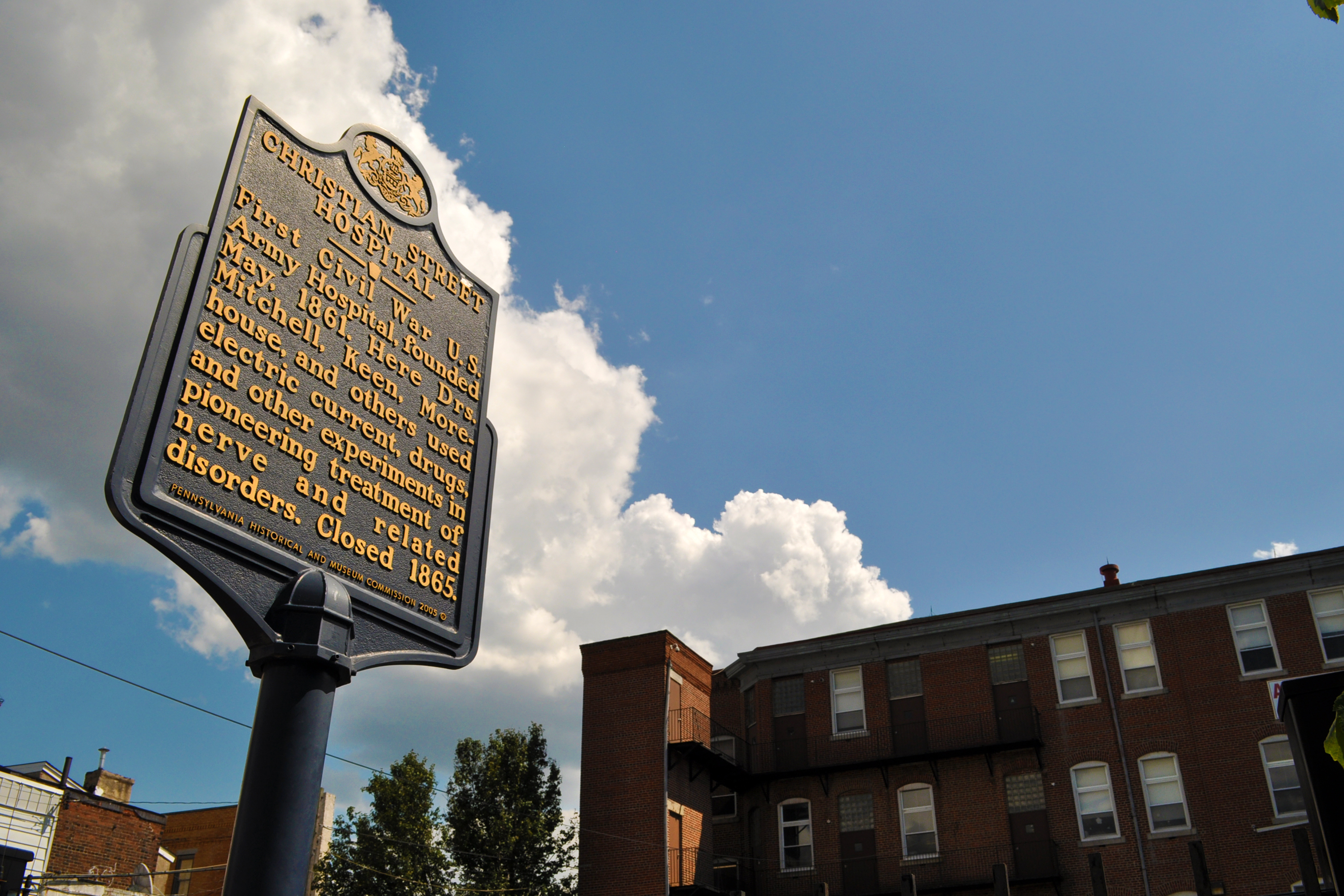
Christian Street Hospital Historical Marker

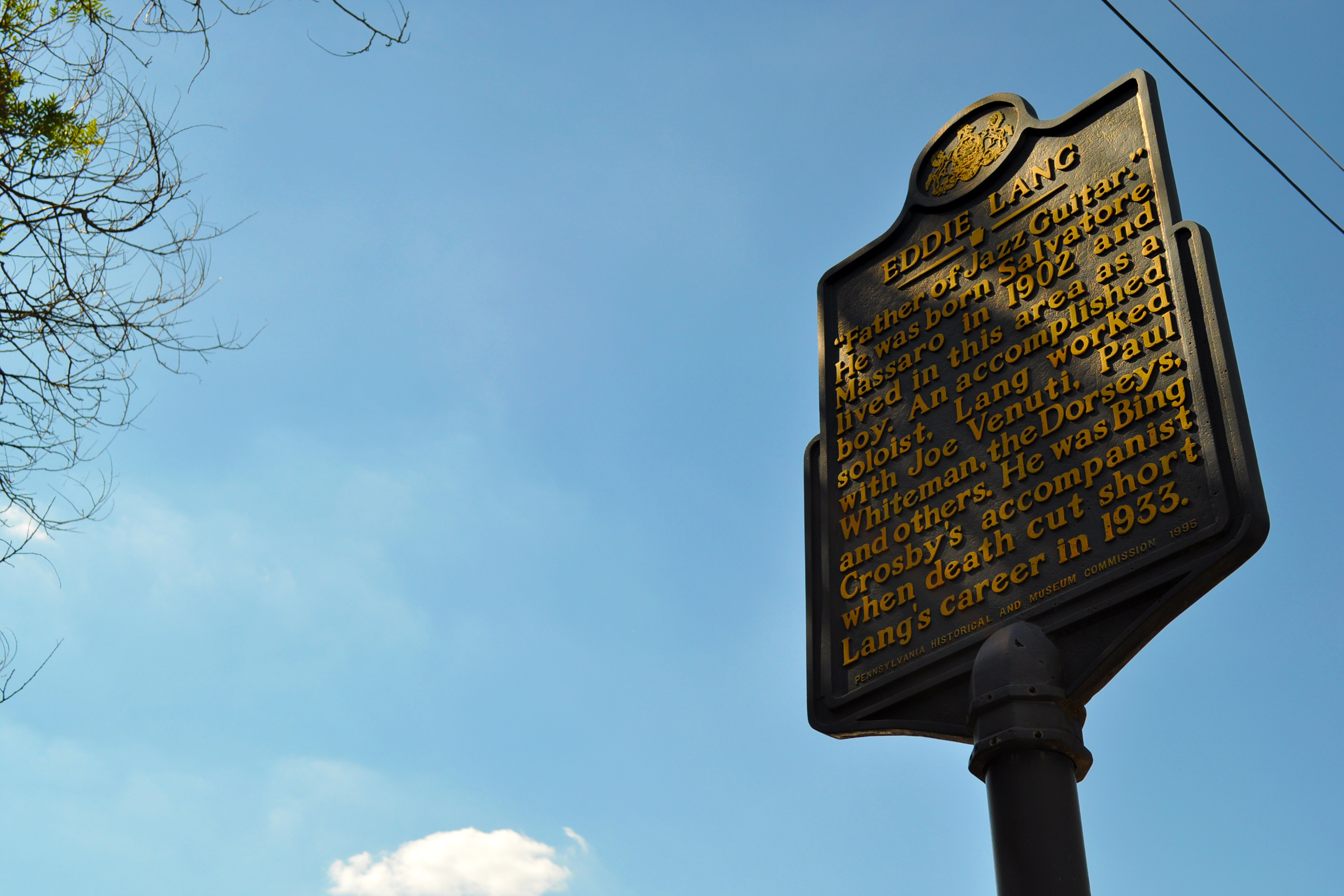
Eddie Lang Historical Marker

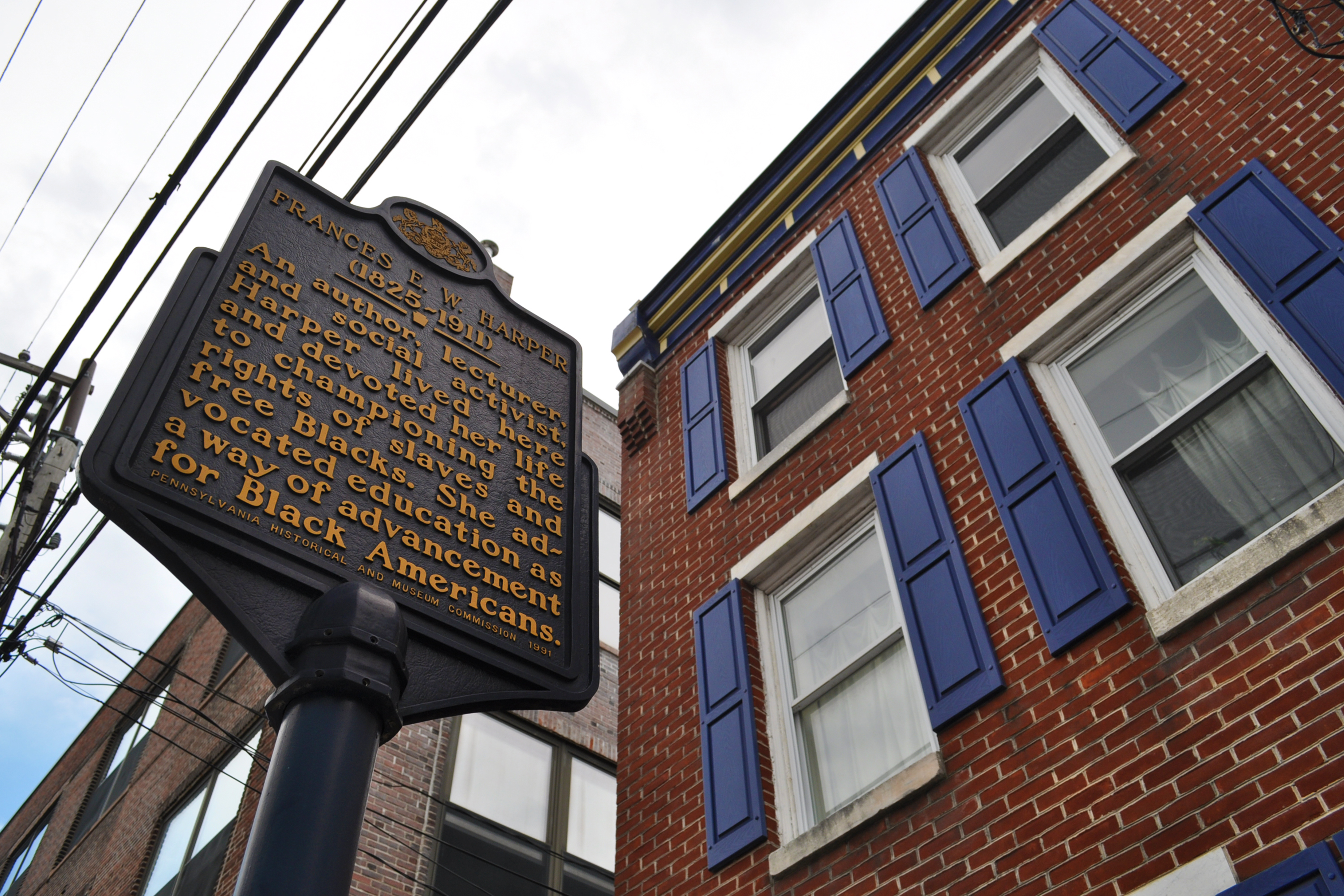
Frances Ellen Watkins Harper Historical Marker

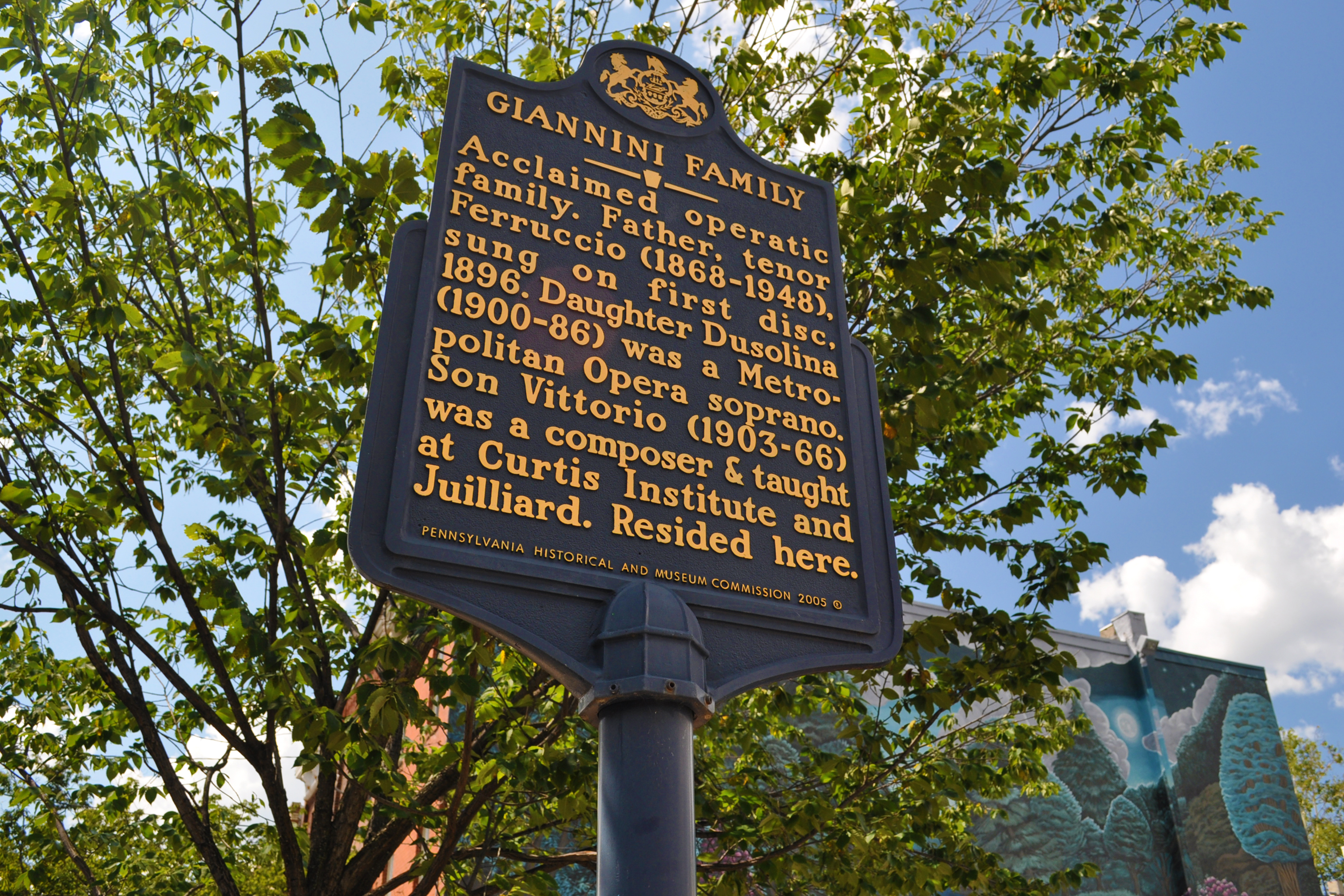
Giannini Family Historical Marker

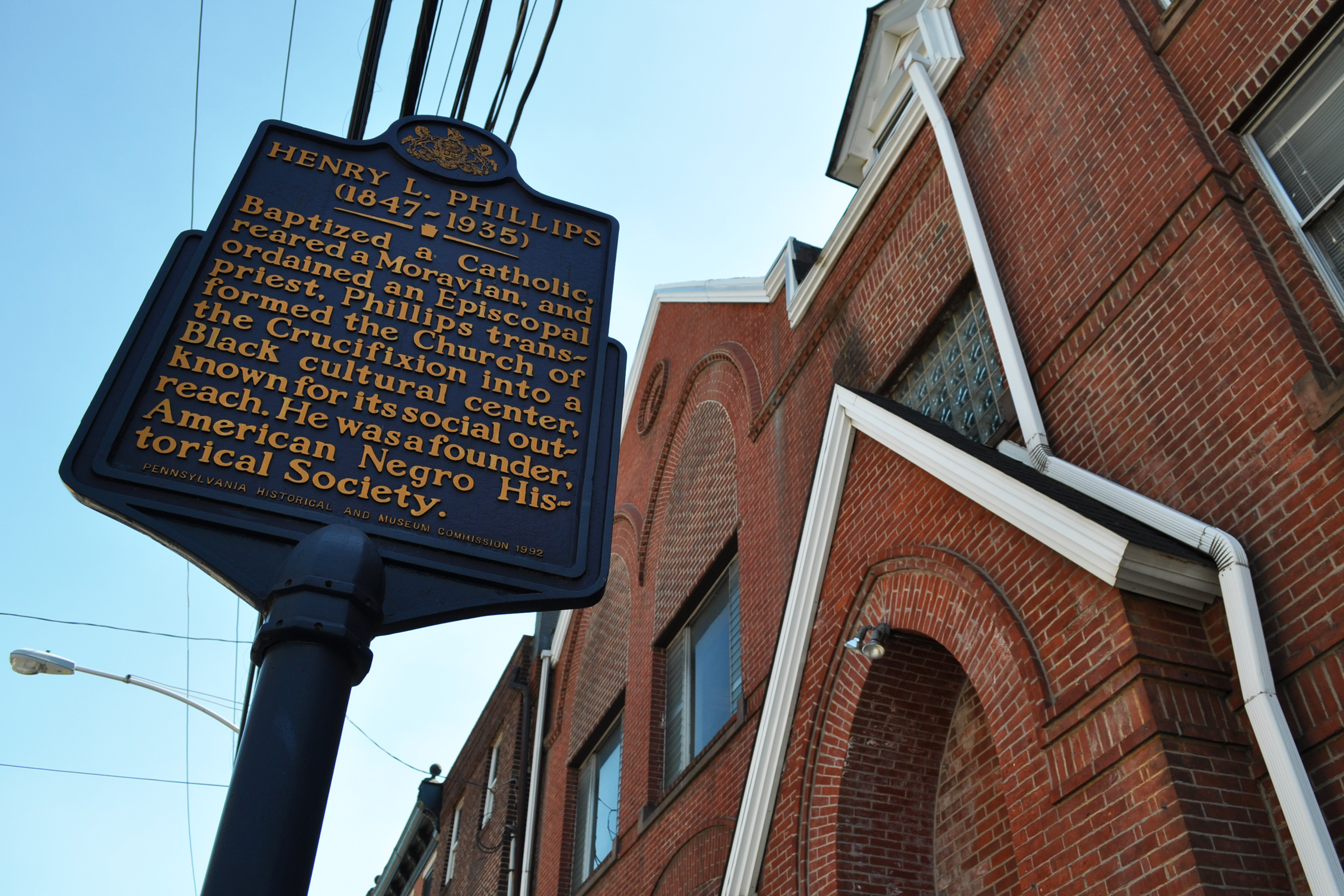
Henry L Phillips Historical Marker

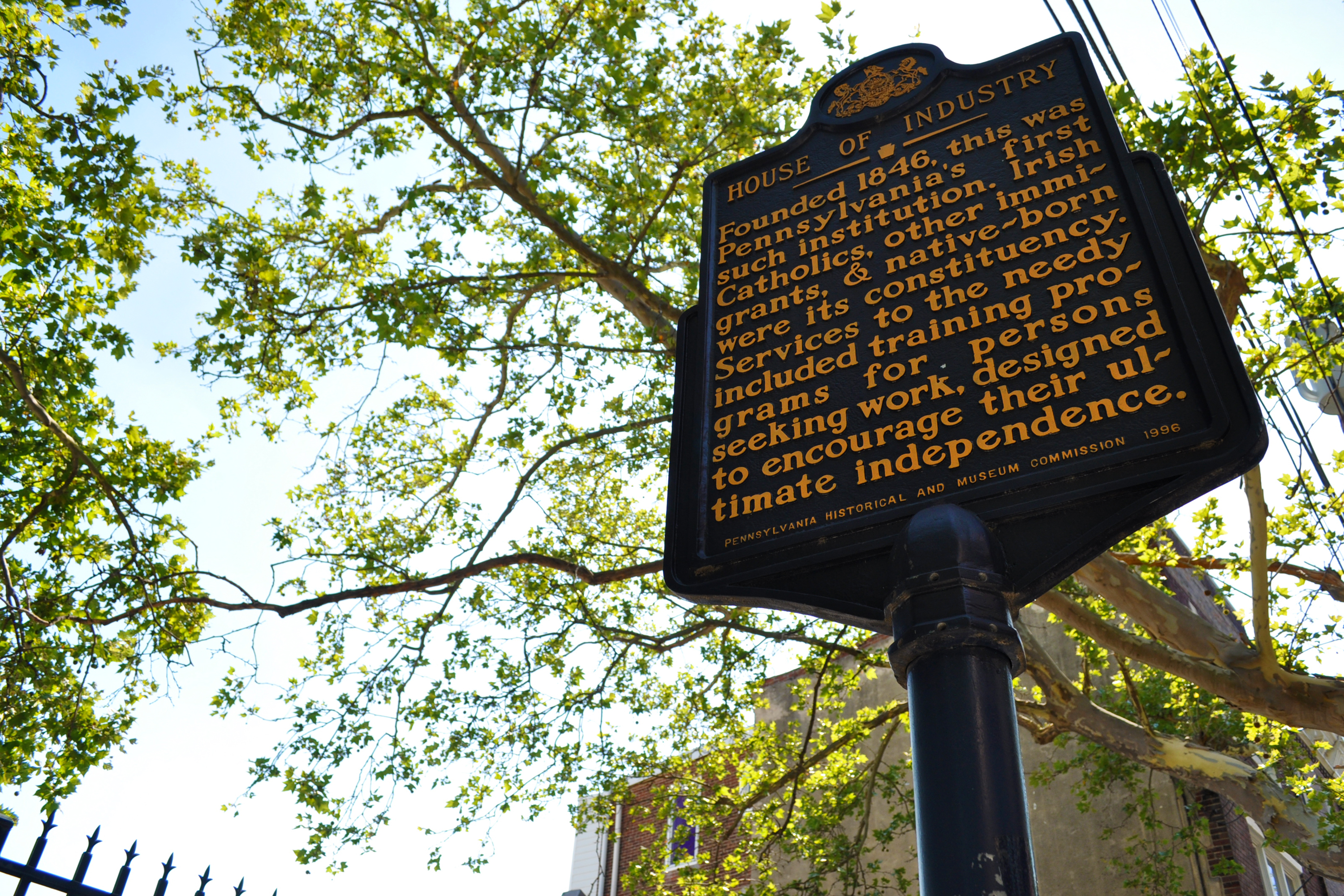
House of Industry Historical Marker

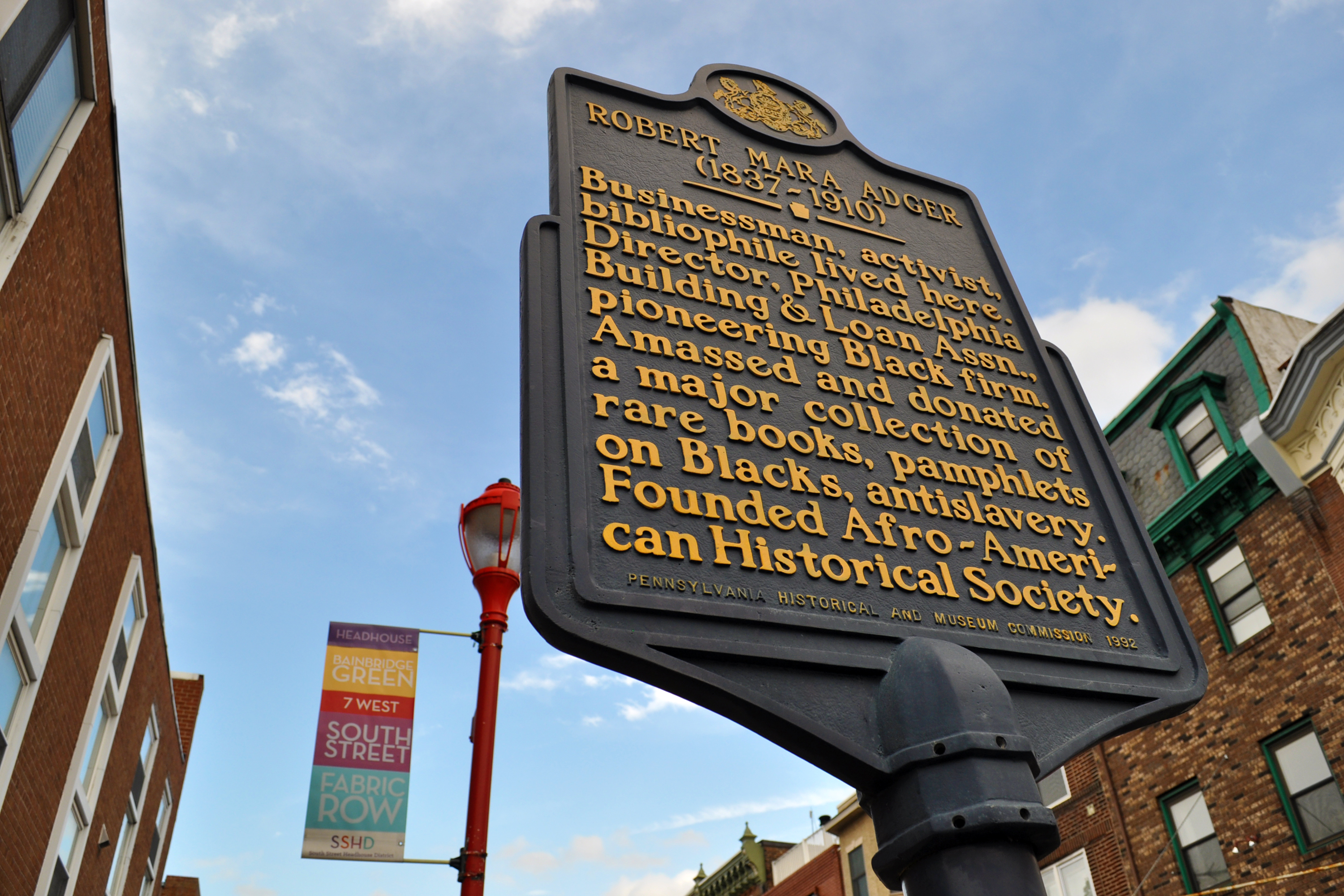
Robert Mara Adger Historical Marker

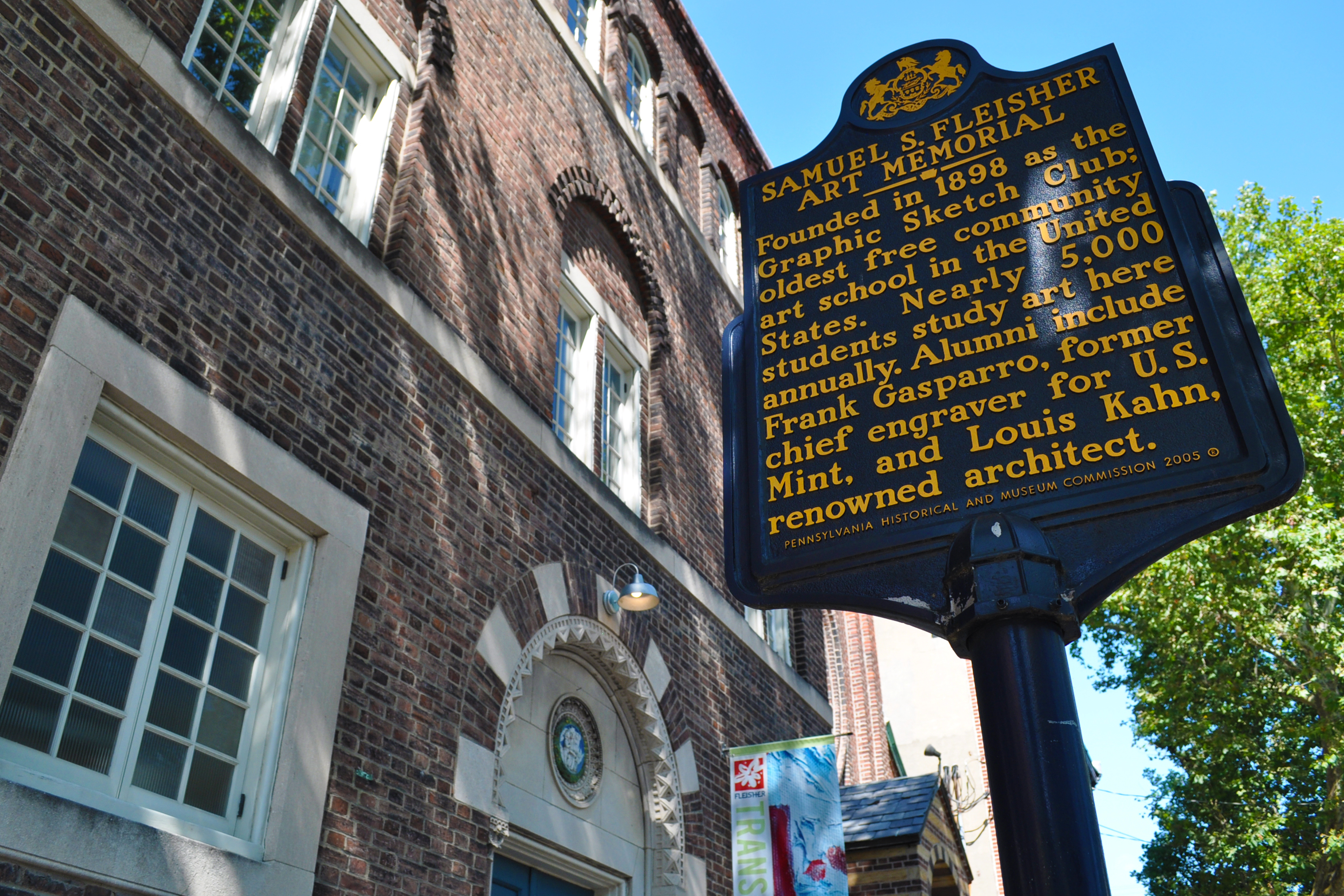
Samuel S Fleisher Art Memorial Historical Marker

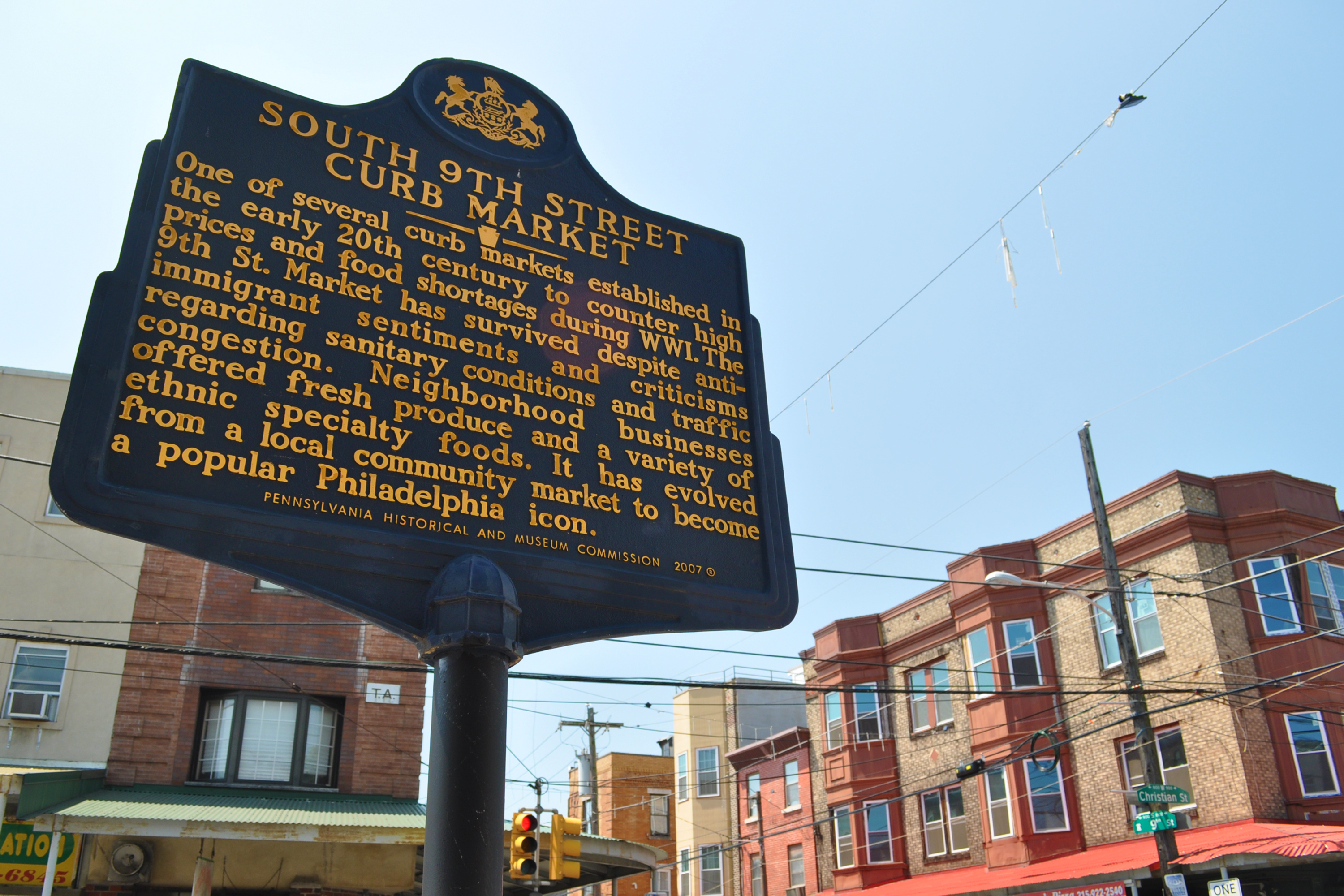
South 9th Street Curb Market Historical Marker

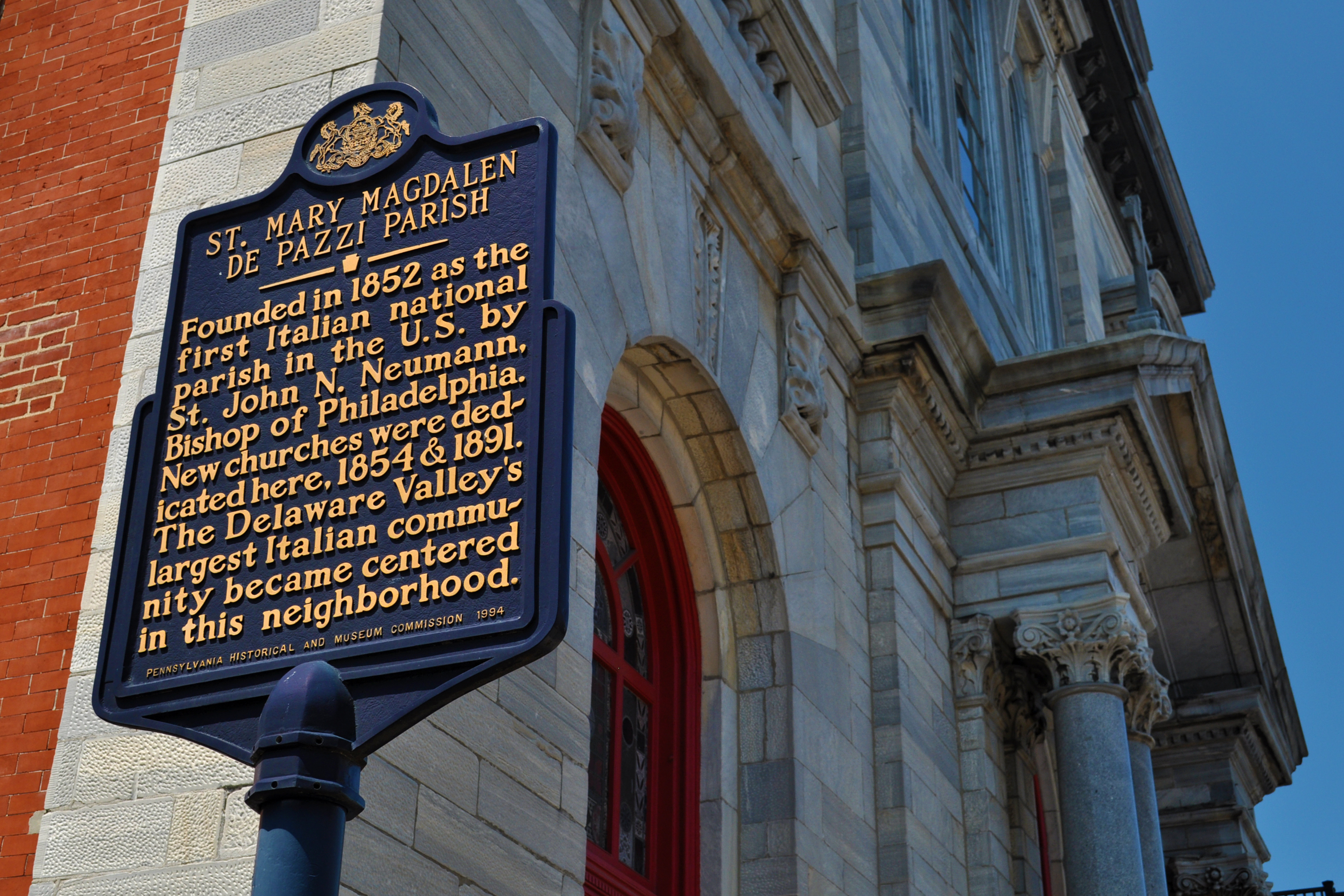
St Mary Magdalen De Pazzi Parish Historical Marker

== Present day ==
Commercial activity within Bella Vista is focused around the 9th Street Market and South Street Headhouse District.

Bella Vista was voted 2016 best neighborhood to live in Philadelphia by Niche.com and is undergoing a new residential construction housing boom to meet demand; in some cases adaptively reusing, in other cases replacing existing structures by destroying historic and culturally significant buildings including the Christian Street Baptist Church.

The neighborhood is served by the Bella Vista Neighbors Association (BVNA), as the primary Registered Community Organization (RCO) in Bella Vista. BVNA holds zoning hearings, safety awareness, cleanup and beautification, coordinates delivery of city services, provides a public forum, and holds social events.

The neighborhood is served by Police Service Area 1 (PSA1) of the 3rd District, operating out of the South Street Mini Station, as well as the main municipal building at 11th and Wharton Streets.

== Culture ==
Annual festivals in the neighborhood include the Italian Market Festival.

The Fleisher Art Memorial and Philadelphia's Magic Gardens are two large non-profit cultural institutions located within Bella Vista, along with the DaVinci Art Alliance, Jed Williams Gallery, and others.

Prior to Halloween, La Calaca Flaca and Fleischer Art Memorial organize and present a Día de los Muertos Altar Celebration and Procession. The first event took place in 2013.

== Education ==
The School District of Philadelphia operates the neighborhood's public schools. Bella Vista contains portions of the catchment area served by Fanny Jackson Coppin School (formerly Andrew Jackson Elementary School), William M. Meredith School, and George W. Nebinger School. As of 2017 all three K-8 schools are at or nearing capacity and are highly in demand.

All residents of Bella Vista are zoned to Furness High School.

The Free Library of Philadelphia operates the Charles Santore Branch, serving Bella Vista. Before 2004 Santore was known as the Southwark Branch.

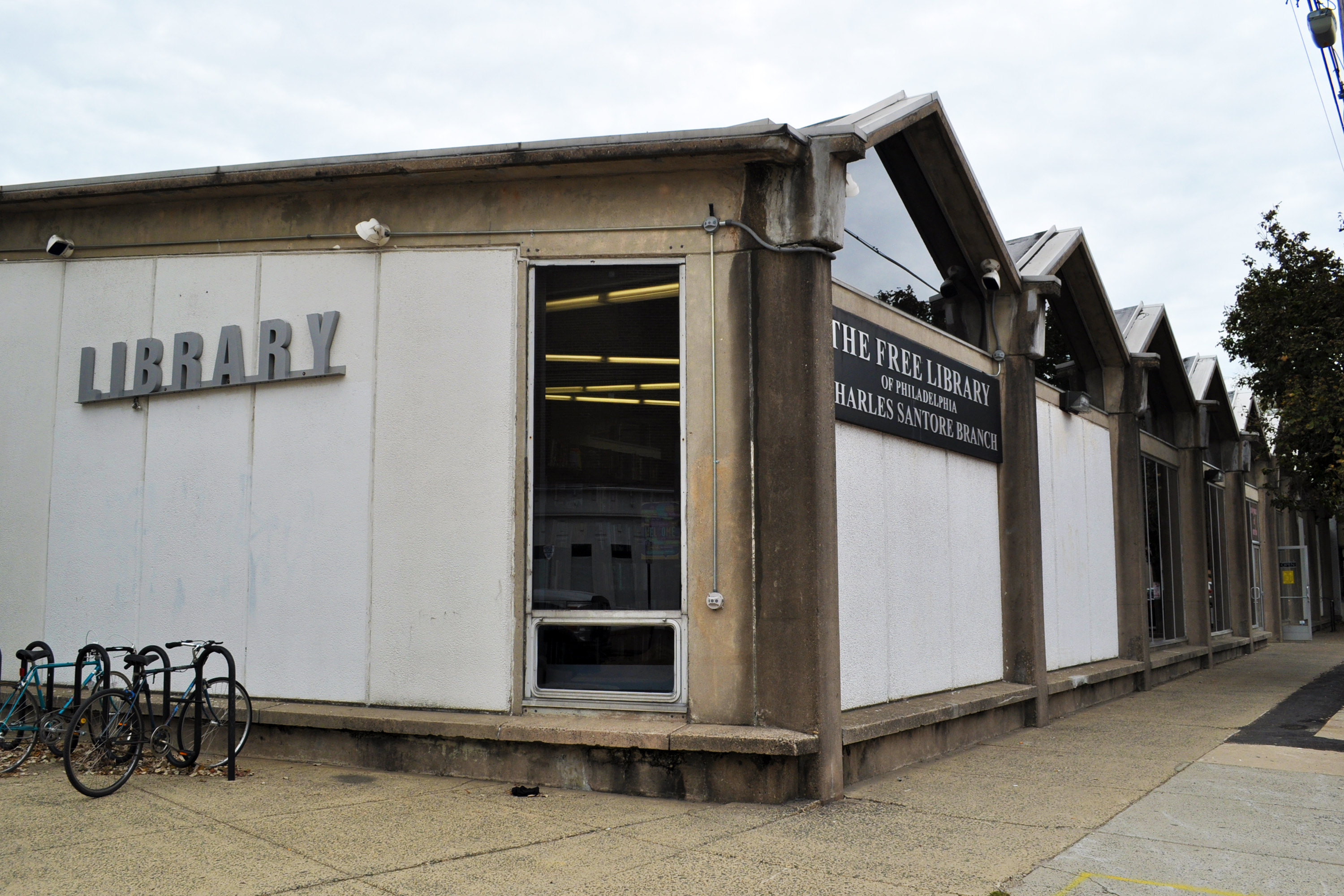
Santore Branch

== Public parks ==
Bella Vista is home to Cianfrani Park, located at 8th and Fitzwater Streets; Bardascino Park, 10th and Carpenter Streets on the former site of Touro Hall and Community Hospital; Palumbo Park, www.palumbopark.org, 700 block of Catherine Street; the Palumbo Recreation Center, 10th and Fitzwater Streets, and adjacent to Starr Garden, 6th and Lombard Streets.

Each park is supported through the volunteer efforts of its own Friends of Parks group, which helps maintain and raise funds to support the maintenance of the park and its trees and plants. The volunteer groups also produce public events in the parks such as summer concert series, yoga, and outdoor movies. Bardascino Park hosts a neighborhood bocce league.

Bella Vista features a permanent community garden at 10th and Kimball Streets.
