= The Philadelphia Negro =

1899 work by W. E. B. Du Bois

The Philadelphia Negro: A Social Study
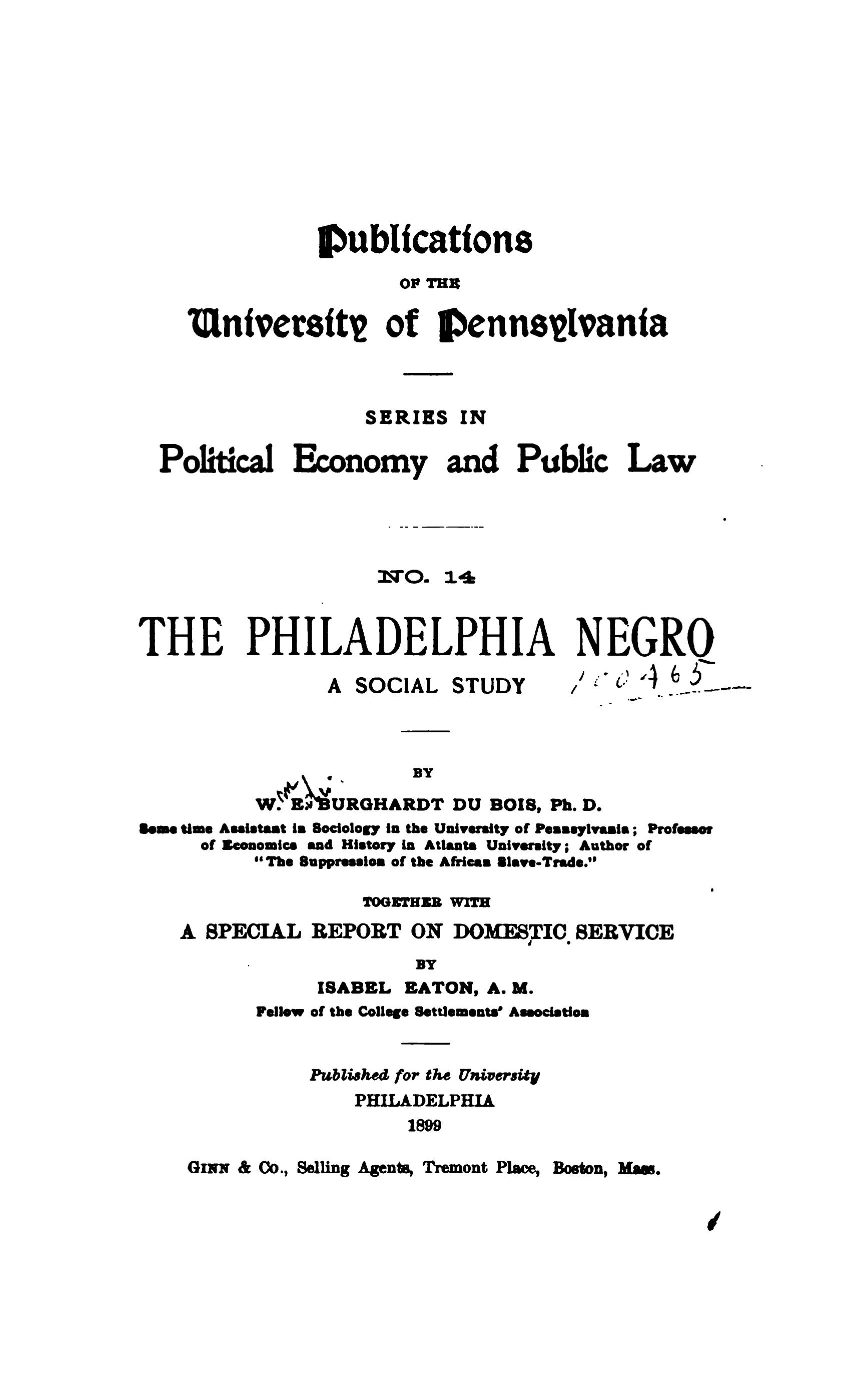
- Cover page of an 1899 printing
- Author: W. E. B. DuBois
- Language: English
- Publisher: University of Pennsylvania Press
- Publication date: 1899
- Publication place: United States
- Media type: Print (hardback)
- Pages: 520
- LC Class: PF158.9.N3 D8 1899

The Philadelphia Negro is a sociological and epidemiological study of African Americans in Philadelphia that was written by W. E. B. Du Bois, commissioned by the University of Pennsylvania and published in 1899 with the intent of identifying social problems present in the African American community.

It was the first sociological case study of a black community in the United States and one of the earliest examples of sociology as a statistically based social science. The study challenged notions that Black Americans experienced poverty, illness, and deprivation because of their biological character.

Du Bois gathered information for the study in the period between August 1896 and December 1897. Du Bois carefully mapped every black residence, church, and business in the city's Seventh Ward, recording occupational and family structure. Du Bois's Philadelphia research was pivotal in his reformulation of the concept of race. He deduced that, "the Negro problem looked at in one way is but the old world questions of ignorance, poverty, crime, and the dislike of the stranger." He supported these claims with examples and survey analysis breakdowns throughout the journal.

== Problem identification ==
During the 1890s, the Negro population in Philadelphia was afflicted with many of the problems seen across the U.S. in areas of low socioeconomic status. Crime, poverty and drug addiction were among the many issues that the Philadelphia Negro population dealt with that added to the apparent social blight of the community.

== Survey conduct ==
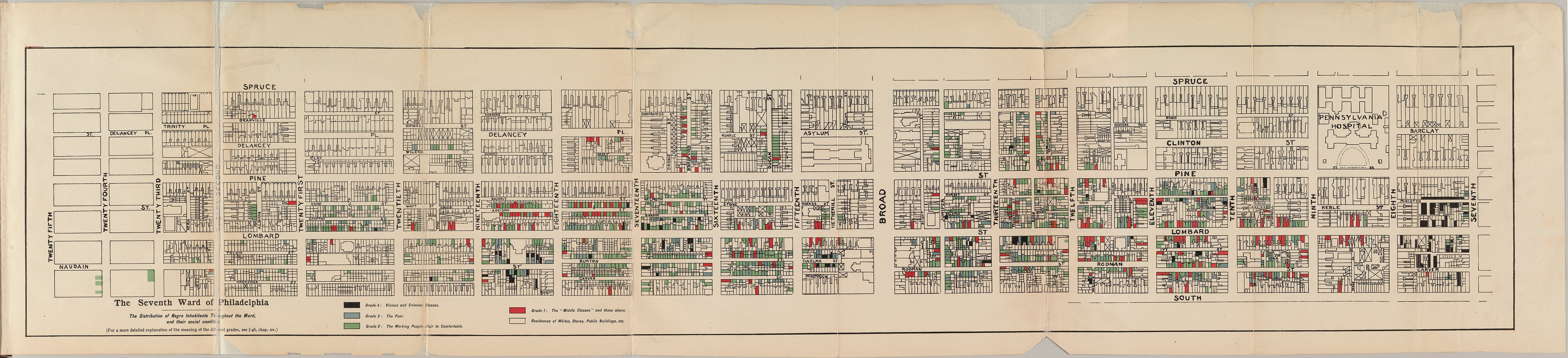
Distribution of African American inhabitants of the 7th Ward, from The Philadelphia Negro

In order to collect survey data, Du Bois and his wife moved into the 7th ward of Philadelphia; he then distributed the survey in impoverished quarters on Saint Mary Street, from 1896 to 1897. With his only appointed assistant, Isabel Eaton, Du Bois employed "archival research, descriptive statistics, and questionnaires." These surveys entailed questions about occupations, health, education, and religious, social, and family life. While conducting a door-to-door examination of the ward, Du Bois and Eaton were able to collect more than 5,000 personal interviews. This survey data included the vital statistics of Black individuals within the city, information about their places of birth, occupation, health, ages, sex, etc.

The sample size for Du Bois's study was limited in that it was a neighborhood study of the central Seventh Ward, which encompassed the area from Spruce to South Street and from Seventh Street to the Schuylkill River. There was significant diversity within this neighborhood. Its western fringe was occupied by affluent whites, its center filled with one of the nation's densest concentrations of Black elites, and its eastern front inhabited by numerous poor from both races. The eastern side was also notorious as the city's Black ghetto.

== Findings of the study ==
The findings of Philadelphia research revealed a community of diversity and advancement; yet it simultaneously reaffirmed the reality of poverty, crime, and illiteracy. Addressing this contradiction, Du Bois explained that Black members of the community possessed their own internal class structure, and therefore should not be judged solely by the "submerged tenth," the ten percent of the population who were beneath the surface of socioeconomic viability. Likewise, the "Negro problem" was ostensibly "not one problem, but rather a plexus of social problems," and had less correlation to a black "social pathology" than to whites' enforcement of racial discrimination and a provision of unequal opportunity.

Du Bois emphasized socio-economic and historical causes of the "Negro problem," notably the exclusion of Black residents from the city's premier industrial jobs, the prevalence of Black single-family homes, and the continued legacy of slavery and unequal race relations. Such biased provision was evident in housing. Du Bois found that African Americans had to pay "abnormally high rents for the poorest accommodations, and race-prejudice accentuates this difficulty, out of which many evils grow."

== Possible solutions ==
Du Bois ended his study with a section entitled "The Meaning of All of This." In this section, he explained the overarching dilemma of African Americans as viewed through the eyes of the majority of Americans. By changing how Blacks were perceived in America, from inferior to equally capable, he theorized that many of the problems seen in the Black community would subside. Du Bois stated that if change were expected to occur in Philadelphia's Black communities, both the Black and White communities would need to work in tandem. He assigned responsibilities for Blacks and Whites in this section.

== Contemporary recognition ==
In spring 2008, Philadelphia's Mural Arts Program, in partnership with The Ward project, memorialized the history of The Philadelphia Negro with the mural Mapping Courage on the side of Engine Company 11's building at South 6th Street and South Street. The company was one of the original twenty-two fire companies established by Philadelphia's first paid municipal fire department in 1871. Until the Philadelphia Fire Department officially desegregated in 1952, Engine 11 was Philadelphia's de facto African American firehouse. The company's original building at 1016 South Street still stands and belongs to the Waters Memorial African Methodist Church.

== See also ==
- History of African Americans in Philadelphia
