= Frances Ellen Watkins Harper House =

Historic house in Pennsylvania, United States

- U.S. National Register of Historic Places
- U.S. National Historic Landmark
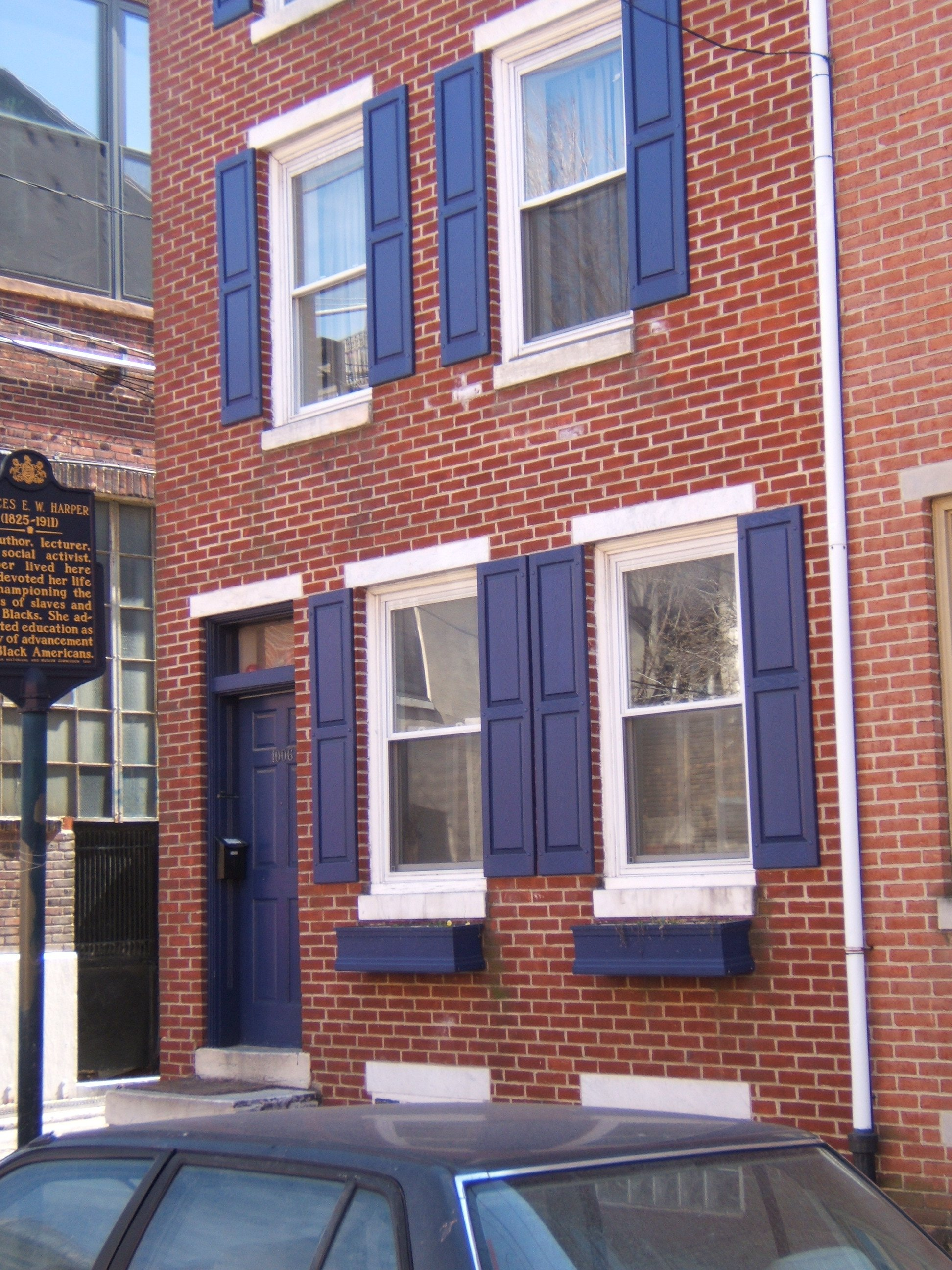
- Harper House in 2009

- Location within Philadelphia Location within Pennsylvania Location within the United States
- Location: 1006 Bainbridge St., Philadelphia, Pennsylvania
- Coordinates: 39°56′30″N 75°9′34″W
- Area: less than one acre
- Built: 1870
- NRHP reference No.: 76001663

Significant dates
- Added to NRHP: December 8, 1976
- Designated NHL: December 8, 1976

The Frances Ellen Watkins Harper House is a historic row house at 1006 Bainbridge Street in Philadelphia, Pennsylvania, USA. Of uncertain construction date, it was the home of Frances Ellen Watkins Harper (1825-1911) from 1870 until her death. Harper was a prominent African-American abolitionist, women's rights and civil rights activist, and author. It was designated a National Historic Landmark in 1976.

== Description and history ==
The Frances Ellen Watkins Harper House stands in the Bella Vista neighborhood of South Philadelphia, at the southwest corner of Bainbridge and Alder Streets. It is the end unit of three rowhouses between Alder and Warnock Streets. It is a three-story masonry structure with no discernible architecture style. Its front is finished in brick, and the side wall facing Alder is stuccoed. The main facade is two bays wide, except the ground floor, where the main entrance is set in the leftmost of three bays. The ground floor brickwork shows evidence (supported by building documentation) of having been refaced after a commercial storefront had been installed.

City building records do not give an indication of when this rowhouse was built. Map and title research indicates that it was here that Frances Harper lived from 1870 until her death in 1911. Harper's life spanned a great variety of activist causes, from abolition prior to the American Civil War to the quest for women's suffrage and African American civil rights in the wake of post-Reconstruction Jim Crow laws. She was a widely printed writer on these subjects, and traveled throughout the North before the Civil War, and in the South as well afterward, speaking on behalf of all of these causes. She also wrote fictional works depicting the conditions of African Americans in the South.

== See also ==
- List of National Historic Landmarks in Philadelphia
- National Register of Historic Places listings in South Philadelphia
