= Isabel Eaton =

American sociologist, social worker, teacher

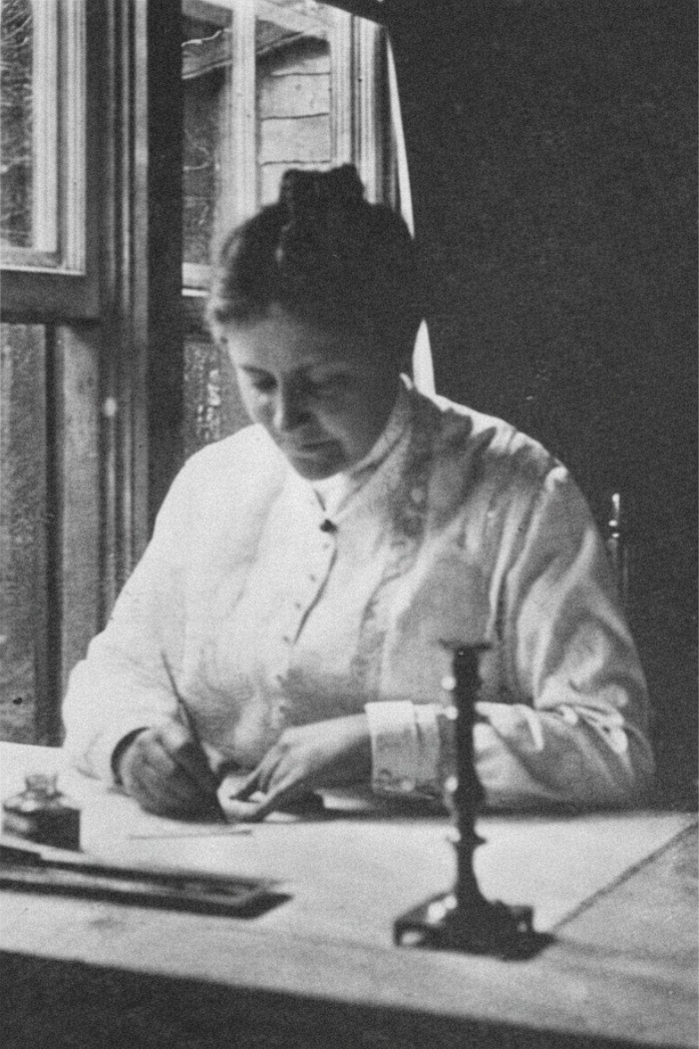
- Born: November 22, 1863; Cape Elizabeth, Maine
- Died: May 16, 1937 (aged 73); Staffordville, Connecticut
- Education: Smith College; Columbia University
- Notable work: The Philadelphia Negro: A Social Study (1899) with W. E. B. Du Bois
- Movement: Settlement movement

Isabel Eaton (22 November 1863 – 16 May 1937) was an American sociologist, researcher, social worker, and teacher, who acted as research assistant to W. E. B. Du Bois on The Philadelphia Negro: A Social Study (1899), the first sociological case study of a Black community in the United States.

== Early life and education ==
Isabel Eaton was in Cape Elizabeth, Maine, and came from an established New England family, related to that of Daniel Webster. Her father was associated with General O. O. Howard.

Eaton graduated from Smith College in 1888, and earned her Master of Arts at Columbia University in 1898. While a graduate student, Eaton collaborated with sociologist Dr. W. E. B. Du Bois, and also authored a paper for Hull House on the wages of cloak makers in Chicago.

== Work with W. E. B. Du Bois ==
Eaton worked with W. E. B. Du Bois as a research assistant and field researcher in the compiling and writing of The Philadelphia Negro, "one of the first works to combine the use of urban ethnography, social history, and descriptive statistics", known today as "a classic work in the social science literature". She was supported by a fellowship from the College Settlements Association.

Du Bois' collaboration with a single white woman, it has been written, was

in complete contravention to the tenor and racist attitudes of the time. Eaton supplied her own 80 page report on Negro Domestic Service as an appendix.

Eaton's report on "Negro Domestic Service in the Seventh Ward, Philadelphia," was based on an eight months' investigation conducted between 1896 and 1897, including home visits. Her work has since been described as "a trailblazing documentation of the social and economic conditions of the single most prominent occupation among blacks in nineteenth-century urban America", although her "contribution to sociology and history... was largely ignored in reviews at the time The Philadelphia Negro was published and in critical assessments in the years since". It has been pointed out that despite Eaton authoring "almost one-fifth of The Philadelphia Negro... none of the analyses of The Philadelphia Negro written by men acknowledge her substantial input." However, Eaton and Du Bois retained a lifelong friendship and lengthy correspondence beyond the study, and Eaton's MA was earned on the basis of her contributions, guided by Du Bois. She was, though, unable to find work in sociology after its publication.

== Settlement work and Ethical Culture ==
Eaton worked at Hull House, Chicago and on the East side in New York. In 1903 she became executive secretary of the Society for Ethical Culture in New York City and held this position for seven years. She was associated in the forming of the National Association for the Advancement of Colored People (NAACP).

In 1910, Eaton went to Robert Gould Shaw House, Boston, which had been founded two years earlier. According to The Crisis, her work there was "pioneer work and especially difficult because of the unrighteous attitude of all other Boston settlements toward colored people". Eaton was there for four years as headworker (1910–1914) before resigning due to ill health. Work at the settlement focused on neighborhood work, and activities including "gym, chaircaning, sewing, embroidery, English literature, brasswork, nursing, cooking, violin, pyrography, elocution, dancing, pottery, ironwork, music, Boy Scouts, Girl Scouts, Highland Tents, Nurses' Club, Choral Club, Progressive Club, Shaw Guards, Checker Club, Young Ladies Imperial Club, and the Kindergarten".

== Later years and death ==
Eaton spent her final years in Staffordville, Connecticut, where she died on 16 May 1937, aged 73.
