= Touro Hall =

Former Jewish community center and school in South Philadelphia

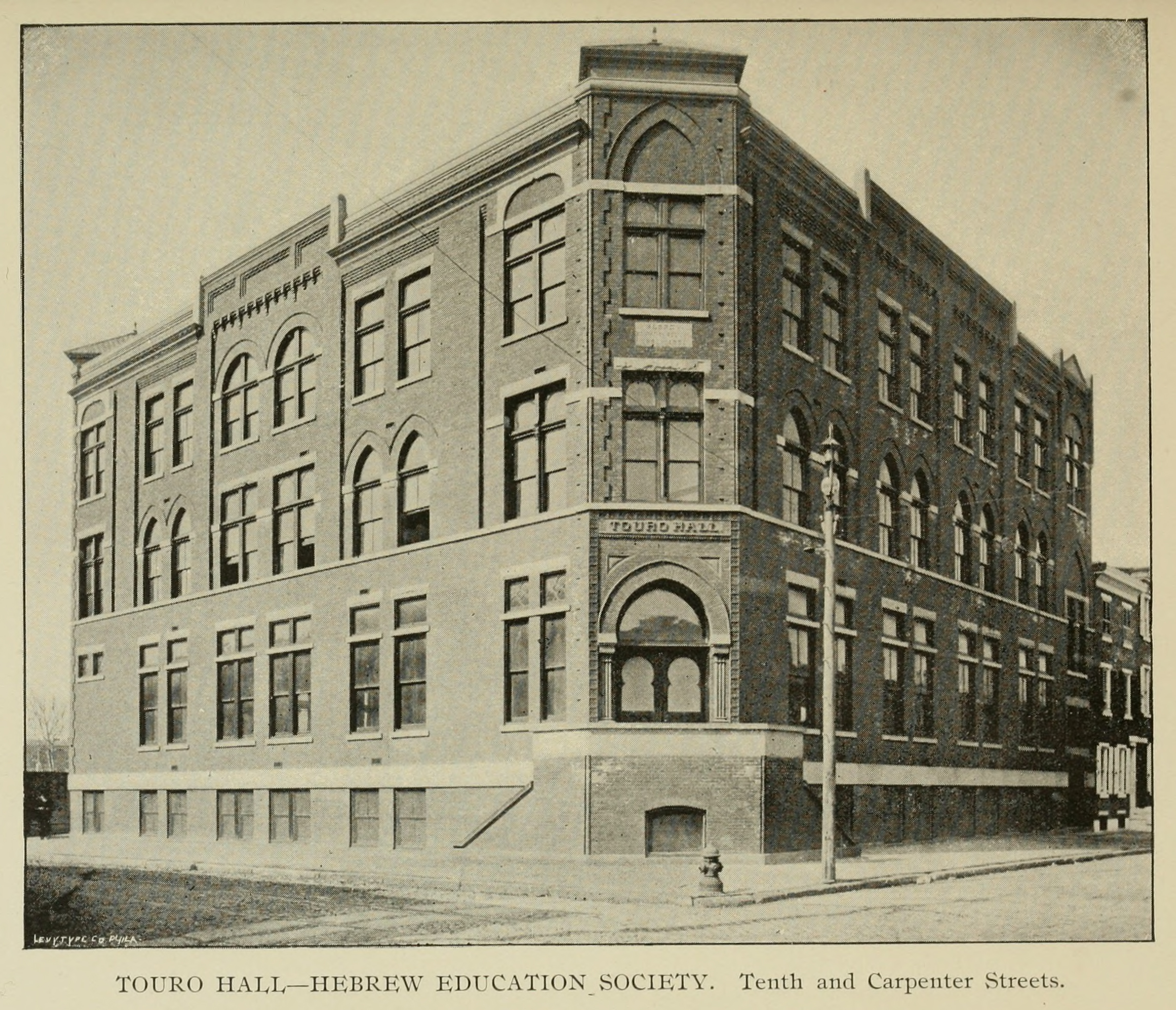
- Touro Hall, 10th and Carpenter Streets, Philadelphia PA (1899)
- Interactive map of the Touro Hall area
- Alternative names: Community Hospital

General information
- Location: 1000 South 10th Street (10th and Carpenter Streets), Philadelphia, Pennsylvania 19147, United States
- Coordinates: 39.937948°N 75.159818°W
- Current tenants: Bardascino Park (1978–present)
- Construction started: September 22, 1891 (Corner stone of Touro Hall laid)
- Inaugurated: November 27, 1891
- Demolished: 1977
- Cost: $52,000 (1891)

Dimensions
- Other dimensions: 77' on Carpenter Street, 87.1-1/8' on Tenth Street, and 89.7' on Paschal (now Kimball) Street

Technical details
- Structural system: Red brick trimmed with granite

Design and construction
- Architect: William H. Decker
- Main contractor: Philip H. Somerset

Touro Hall was a building at 10th and Carpenter Streets in the Bella Vista neighborhood of South Philadelphia. It was named for Judah Touro, a public-spirited citizen of New Orleans and well-known philanthropist, who bequeathed $20,000 to the Hebrew Education Society of Philadelphia in 1854. The building was constructed to provide Jewish education and social resources for the neighborhood's growing Jewish immigrant community.

Touro Hall was built and opened in 1891 by the Hebrew Education Society, and featured a bathing pool and library. It was home to Hebrew School No. 2, and served as a center for Jewish life in South Philadelphia through the 1920s. Fabiani Italian Hospital was located in Touro Hall from the 1920s until its closure in 1968. The building was demolished in 1977, and replaced with Bardascino Park in 1978.

== Hebrew Education Society of Philadelphia ==
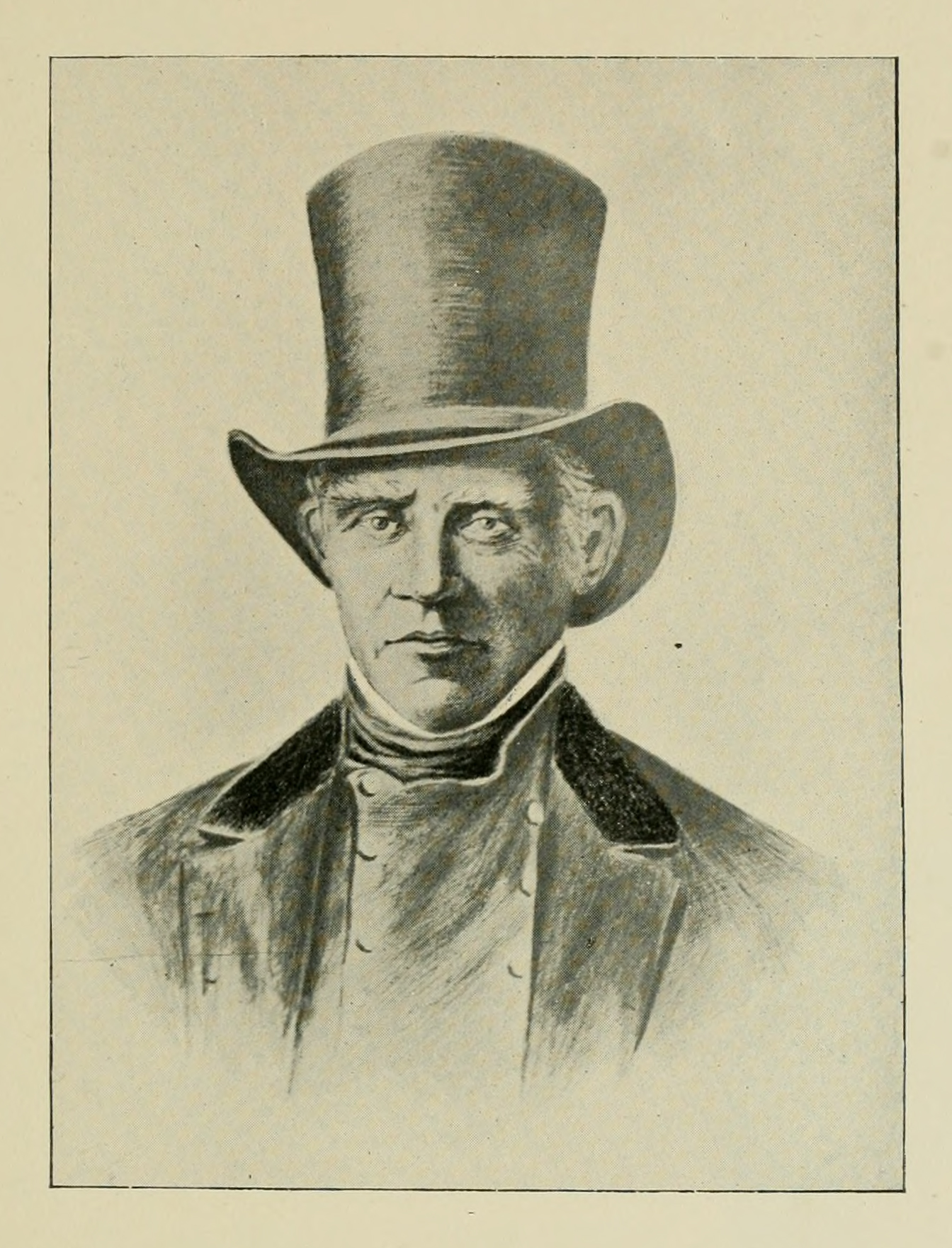
Judah Touro, Benefactor, Hebrew Education Society Touro Hall (1899)

Rabbi Isaac Leeser came to Philadelphia to serve at Mikveh Israel in 1829. In addition to leading the synagogue, he published a Jewish newspaper, authored Bible translations, prayer books, and education materials, and in 1848 directed the organization of the Hebrew Education Society of Philadelphia which was officially founded on March 19, 1848.

The Hebrew Education Society opened Hebrew School No. 2 in 1878, and Philadelphia Jewish philanthropist David Sulzberger was a significant donor and led the construction of Touro Hall in 1891. The Hebrew Education Society purchased the land at 10th and Carpenter in 1891 from Alexander Parker who had operated a botanical garden on the land. Construction began on April 11, 1891.

The corner was depicted in 1845 with a small building that had dated to approximately 1820.

== Jewish Community Center ==
Touro Hall served as one of the centers of Jewish life in South Philadelphia's neighborhoods between 1890 and the 1940s. Many Jewish organizations held activities at Touro Hall including the Southern Branch of the Young Men's and Young Women's Hebrew Association, an employment agency, assistance for recent immigrants, and multiple charitable efforts. The main hall had a seating capacity of 600 for which there was no charge for its use and no entrance fees were charged for entertainment. The 1900 American Jewish Yearbook listed the following programs hosted at Touro Hall, "Night School for instruction in English branches, dressmaking, millinery, garment-cutting, cigar-making, shorthand, and typewriting; free baths, a reading-room and a circulating library; meeting place of the Baron de Hirsch committee and office of its Employment Bureau ... class rooms of the Hebrew Sunday School and the Sewing School."

== Community Hospital ==
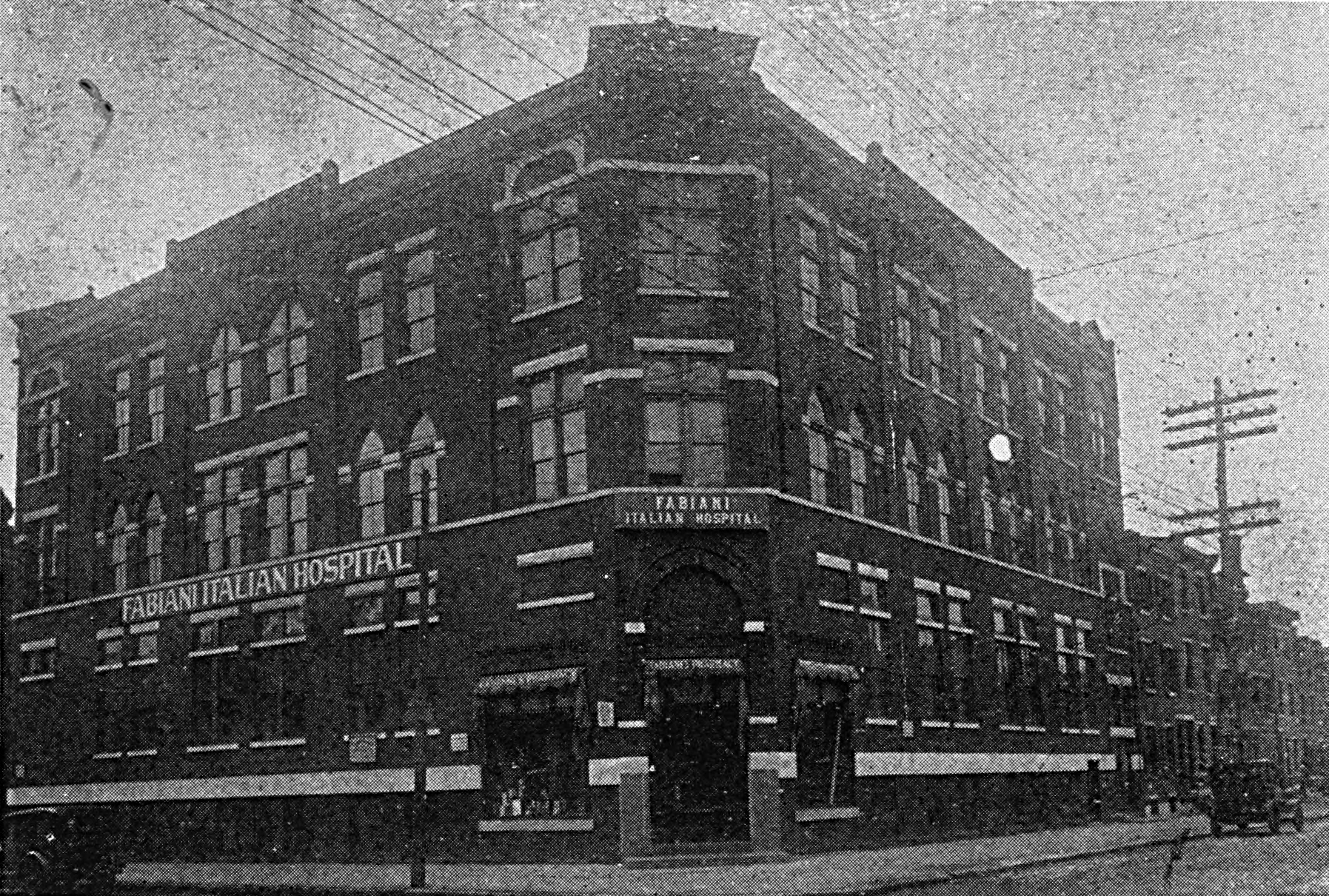
Fabiani Italian Hospital in 1930

Giuseppe Fabiani founded Fabiani Italian Hospital to serve the neighborhood's Italian community in 1904 in a building at 10th and Christian Streets. The hospital had moved to the southwest corner of 10th and Carpenter Streets and into Touro Hall by 1927.

The name changed to Philadelphia Italian Hospital in 1936, and to Community Hospital in 1942. Community Hospital closed in 1968 and the building was demolished in 1977.

== Bardascino Park ==
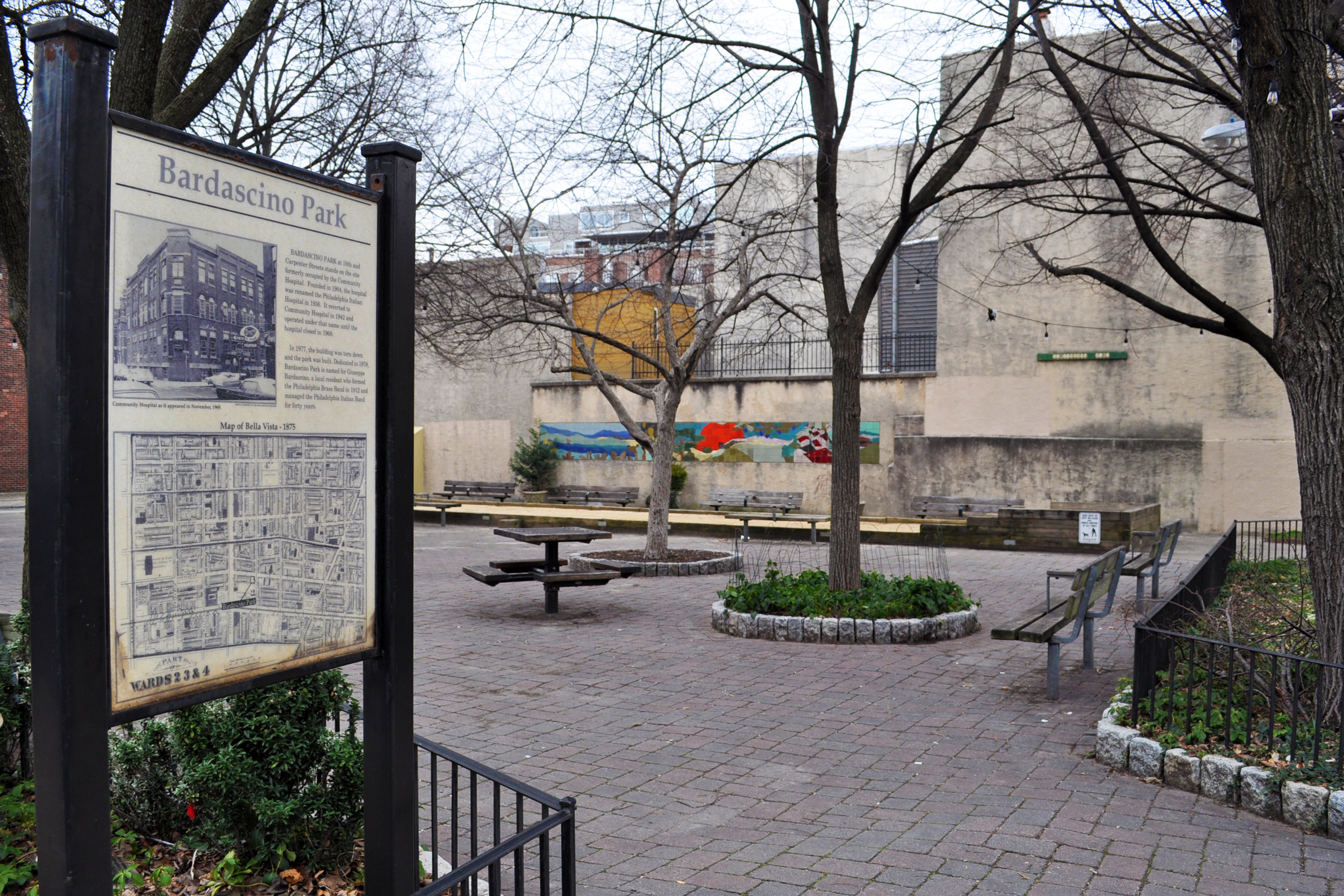
Bardascino Park in January 2020

The City of Philadelphia created Bardascino Park on the former Touro Hall site in 1978, named for Giuseppe Bardascino, longtime maestro of the Philadelphia Brass Band, and manager of the Philadelphia Italian Band who was a longtime resident of the neighborhood.

The Friends of Bardascino Park formed in 1991 to beautify the park. In 1999 the group became a part of the Parks Revitalization Project, a collaborative partnership between the City of Philadelphia's Department of Recreation and the Pennsylvania Horticultural Society's Philadelphia Green initiative.

The group has secured multiple community partnerships and grants, renovated the park in 2003 and 2004, and has continued to maintain it. Friends of Bardascino Park updated the park's sign at 10th and Carpenter Streets with more detailed history and maps in December 2020.

The park has an active bocce court and the park's summer bocce league was started in 1997 by area resident Chris Archer. The bocce league has a permit to play Monday through Wednesday from 6 to 8:30 p.m. and Sunday from 4 to 8 p.m. By 2024, the Bardascino Park bocce league had grown to 42 teams with a 16-team final tournament.
