= Engine Company No. 11 =

Fire-engine company in Philadelphia, Pennsylvania, United States

Coordinates: 39°56′34″N 75°09′33″W

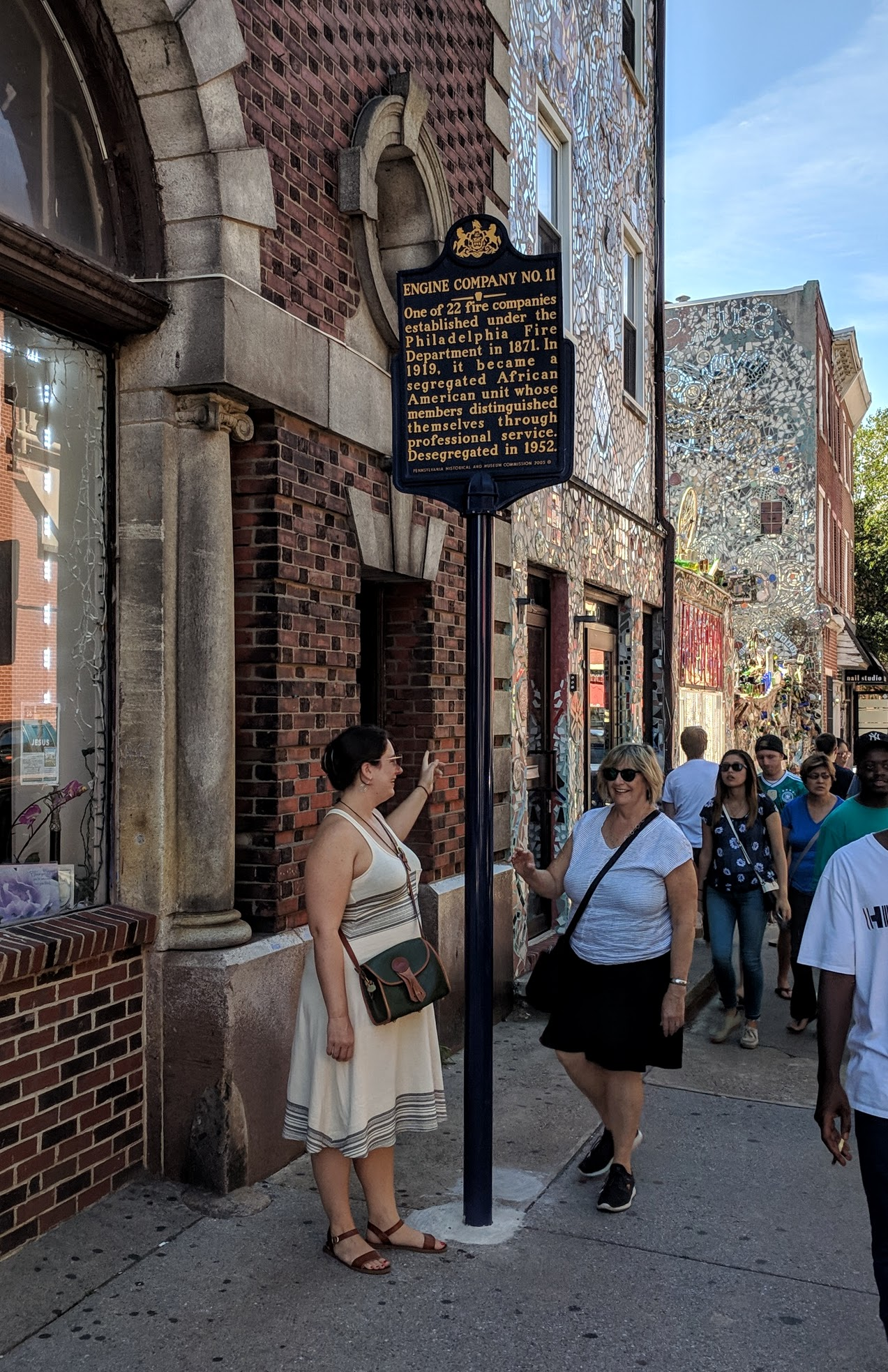
Philadelphia's monument to Engine Company No. 11, "One of 22 fire companies established under the Philadelphia Fire Department in 1871. In 1919, it became a segregated African American unit whose members distinguished themselves through professional service. Desegregated in 1952." At Philadelphia's Magic Gardens, South St. and S. Alder St.

Engine Company No. 11 was a fire-engine company in Philadelphia, Pennsylvania, United States. Established in 1871, it was Philadelphia's only all-black segregated company from 1919, and was desegregated in 1952. In 1871, Philadelphia established its professional fire department, creating 22 fire companies, replacing about 90 volunteer companies. In 1886 Issac Jacobs was hired as the first African-American firefighter and was assigned to Engine Company No. 11. Jacobs was restricted to caring for the horses and performing other menial duties, not allowed to fight fires as his title suggested. Following Jacob's resignation from the position in 1891, Stephen Presco, another African American male, was hired. Unlike Jacobs, Presco was allowed to take part in firefighting activities like his white counterparts, and was killed in the line of duty.

The many men who worked there were referred to as "leather lungs" and were often given the hardest and most dangerous tasks. Due to overstaffing in Engine Company No. 11 as well as surrounding companies in 1952 it was desegregated and prompted the growth of six new mixed fire departments in the area.

In 1976 Engine Company No. 11 was relocated to 601-09 South Street, and the former building now houses Willie G. Williams Community Center. The Community Center’s OpportUNITY program works to help ex-convicts re-enter society through vocational training programs and employment in construction.
