= Pre-2016 statewide opinion polling for the 2016 United States presidential election =

Statewide polls for the 2016 United States presidential election are as follows. The polls listed here, by state, are from 2013 to December 31, 2015, and provide early data on opinion polling between a possible Republican candidate against a possible Democratic candidate.

Note some states did not conduct polling before December 31, 2015.

== Alaska ==
3 electoral votes
(Republican in 2008) 59%–38%
(Republican in 2012) 55%–41%

Poll source	Date administered	Democrat	%	Republican	%	Lead margin	Sample size	Margin of error
Public Policy Polling	September 18–21, 2014	Hillary Clinton	39%	Jeb Bush	44%	5	880	± 3.3%
Public Policy Polling	September 18–21, 2014	Hillary Clinton	36%	Chris Christie	46%	10	880	± 3.3%
Public Policy Polling	September 18–21, 2014	Hillary Clinton	39%	Ted Cruz	46%	7	880	± 3.3%
Public Policy Polling	September 18–21, 2014	Hillary Clinton	40%	Mike Huckabee	44%	4	880	± 3.3%
Public Policy Polling	September 18–21, 2014	Hillary Clinton	44%	Sarah Palin	38%	6	880	± 3.3%
Public Policy Polling	September 18–21, 2014	Hillary Clinton	40%	Rand Paul	45%	5	880	± 3.3%
Public Policy Polling	July 31 – August 3, 2014	Hillary Clinton	38%	Jeb Bush	47%	9	673	± 3.8%
Public Policy Polling	July 31 – August 3, 2014	Hillary Clinton	34%	Chris Christie	45%	11	673	± 3.8%
Public Policy Polling	July 31 – August 3, 2014	Hillary Clinton	39%	Mike Huckabee	47%	8	673	± 3.8%
Public Policy Polling	July 31 – August 3, 2014	Hillary Clinton	46%	Sarah Palin	40%	6	673	± 3.8%
Public Policy Polling	July 31 – August 3, 2014	Hillary Clinton	36%	Rand Paul	50%	14	673	± 3.8%
Public Policy Polling	May 8–11, 2014	Hillary Clinton	41%	Jeb Bush	47%	6	582	± 4.1%
Public Policy Polling	May 8–11, 2014	Hillary Clinton	41%	Chris Christie	44%	3	582	± 4.1%
Public Policy Polling	May 8–11, 2014	Hillary Clinton	42%	Mike Huckabee	43%	1	582	± 4.1%
Public Policy Polling	May 8–11, 2014	Hillary Clinton	44%	Sarah Palin	41%	3	582	± 4.1%
Public Policy Polling	May 8–11, 2014	Hillary Clinton	40%	Rand Paul	46%	6	582	± 4.1%
Public Policy Polling	January 30 – February 1, 2014	Hillary Clinton	39%	Jeb Bush	47%	8	850	± 3.4%
Public Policy Polling	January 30 – February 1, 2014	Hillary Clinton	39%	Chris Christie	43%	4	850	± 3.4%
Public Policy Polling	January 30 – February 1, 2014	Hillary Clinton	41%	Mike Huckabee	45%	4	850	± 3.4%
Public Policy Polling	January 30 – February 1, 2014	Hillary Clinton	44%	Sarah Palin	43%	1	850	± 3.4%
Public Policy Polling	January 30 – February 1, 2014	Hillary Clinton	41%	Rand Paul	47%	6	850	± 3.4%
Public Policy Polling	July 25–28, 2013	Hillary Clinton	42%	Jeb Bush	49%	7	890	± 3.3%
Public Policy Polling	July 25–28, 2013	Hillary Clinton	38%	Chris Christie	46%	8	890	± 3.3%
Public Policy Polling	July 25–28, 2013	Hillary Clinton	49%	Sarah Palin	40%	9	890	± 3.3%
Public Policy Polling	July 25–28, 2013	Hillary Clinton	43%	Rand Paul	49%	6	890	± 3.3%
Public Policy Polling	July 25–28, 2013	Hillary Clinton	42%	Marco Rubio	45%	3	890	± 3.3%
Public Policy Polling	July 25–28, 2013	Hillary Clinton	46%	Paul Ryan	47%	1	890	± 3.3%
Public Policy Polling	February 4–5, 2013	Hillary Clinton	42%	Chris Christie	43%	1	1,129	± 2.9%
Public Policy Polling	February 4–5, 2013	Hillary Clinton	53%	Sarah Palin	37%	16	1,129	± 2.9%
Public Policy Polling	February 4–5, 2013	Hillary Clinton	44%	Marco Rubio	43%	1	1,129	± 2.9%

== Arizona ==
11 electoral votes
(Republican in 2008) 53%–45%
(Republican in 2012) 53%–44%

Poll source	Date administered	Democrat	%	Republican	%	Lead margin	Sample size	Margin of error
Strategies 360	December 4–9, 2015	Hillary Clinton	42%	Donald Trump	44%	2	504	± 4.4%
Strategies 360	December 4–9, 2015	Hillary Clinton	37%	Marco Rubio	53%	16	504	± 4.4%
Strategies 360	December 4–9, 2015	Hillary Clinton	40%	Ted Cruz	50%	10	504	± 4.4%
Public Policy Polling	May 1–3, 2015	Hillary Clinton	41%	Jeb Bush	41%	Tied	600	± 4%
Public Policy Polling	May 1–3, 2015	Hillary Clinton	42%	Ben Carson	42%	Tied	600	± 4%
Public Policy Polling	May 1–3, 2015	Hillary Clinton	39%	Chris Christie	46%	7	600	± 4%
Public Policy Polling	May 1–3, 2015	Hillary Clinton	43%	Ted Cruz	44%	1	600	± 4%
Public Policy Polling	May 1–3, 2015	Hillary Clinton	41%	Mike Huckabee	44%	3	600	± 4%
Public Policy Polling	May 1–3, 2015	Hillary Clinton	40%	Rand Paul	45%	5	600	± 4%
Public Policy Polling	May 1–3, 2015	Hillary Clinton	44%	Rick Perry	41%	3	600	± 4%
Public Policy Polling	May 1–3, 2015	Hillary Clinton	41%	Marco Rubio	43%	2	600	± 4%
Public Policy Polling	May 1–3, 2015	Hillary Clinton	43%	Scott Walker	44%	1	600	± 4%
Public Policy Polling	May 1–3, 2015	Lincoln Chafee	26%	Scott Walker	41%	15	600	± 4%
Public Policy Polling	May 1–3, 2015	Martin O'Malley	25%	Scott Walker	43%	18	600	± 4%
Public Policy Polling	May 1–3, 2015	Bernie Sanders	28%	Scott Walker	43%	15	600	± 4%
Public Policy Polling	May 1–3, 2015	Jim Webb	26%	Scott Walker	44%	18	600	± 4%
Public Policy Polling	February 28 – March 2, 2014	Hillary Clinton	46%	Jan Brewer	39%	7	870	± 3.3%
Public Policy Polling	February 28 – March 2, 2014	Hillary Clinton	44%	Jeb Bush	45%	1	870	± 3.3%
Public Policy Polling	February 28 – March 2, 2014	Hillary Clinton	44%	Chris Christie	41%	3	870	± 3.3%
Public Policy Polling	February 28 – March 2, 2014	Hillary Clinton	47%	Mike Huckabee	41%	6	870	± 3.3%
Public Policy Polling	February 28 – March 2, 2014	Hillary Clinton	46%	Rand Paul	43%	3	870	± 3.3%

== Arkansas ==
6 electoral votes
(Republican in 2008) 59%–39%
(Republican in 2012) 61%–37%

Poll source	Date administered	Democrat	%	Republican	%	Lead margin	Sample size	Margin of error
Gravis Marketing	October 21–27, 2014	Hillary Clinton	38%	Donald Trump	47%	9	568	± 4.1%
Gravis Marketing	September 8–11, 2014	Hillary Clinton	42%	Jeb Bush	49%	7	902	± 4%
Gravis Marketing	September 8–11, 2014	Hillary Clinton	42%	Rand Paul	48%	6	902	± 4%
Public Policy Polling	September 18–24, 2014	Hillary Clinton	42%	Jeb Bush	46%	4	1453	2.6%
Public Policy Polling	September 18–24, 2014	Hillary Clinton	42%	Chris Christie	41%	1	1453	2.6%
Public Policy Polling	September 18–24, 2014	Hillary Clinton	43%	Ted Cruz	44%	1	1453	2.6%
Public Policy Polling	September 18–24, 2014	Hillary Clinton	41%	Mike Huckabee	53%	12	1453	2.6%
Public Policy Polling	September 18–24, 2014	Hillary Clinton	43%	Rand Paul	45%	2	1453	2.6%
Public Policy Polling	August 1–3, 2014	Hillary Clinton	41%	Jeb Bush	46%	5	1,066	± 3%
Public Policy Polling	August 1–3, 2014	Hillary Clinton	41%	Chris Christie	42%	1	1,066	± 3%
Public Policy Polling	August 1–3, 2014	Hillary Clinton	42%	Ted Cruz	46%	4	1,066	± 3%
Public Policy Polling	August 1–3, 2014	Hillary Clinton	39%	Mike Huckabee	55%	16	1,066	± 3%
Public Policy Polling	August 1–3, 2014	Hillary Clinton	42%	Rand Paul	45%	3	1,066	± 3%
Public Policy Polling	April 25–27, 2014	Hillary Clinton	46%	Jeb Bush	41%	5	840	± 3.4%
Public Policy Polling	April 25–27, 2014	Hillary Clinton	47%	Chris Christie	38%	9	840	± 3.4%
Public Policy Polling	April 25–27, 2014	Hillary Clinton	44%	Mike Huckabee	47%	3	840	± 3.4%
Public Policy Polling	April 25–27, 2014	Hillary Clinton	48%	Rand Paul	42%	6	840	± 3.4%

== California ==
55 electoral votes
(Democratic in 2008) 61%–37%
(Democratic in 2012) 60%–37%

Poll source	Date administered	Democrat	%	Republican	%	Lead margin	Sample size	Margin of error
Field Poll	April 23 – May 16, 2015	Hillary Clinton	52%	Jeb Bush	31%	21	435	± 5.0%
Field Poll	April 23 – May 16, 2015	Hillary Clinton	53%	Marco Rubio	32%	21	435	± 5.0%
Field Poll	April 23 – May 16, 2015	Hillary Clinton	54%	Scott Walker	30%	24	435	± 5.0%
Emerson College	April 2–8, 2015	Hillary Clinton	53%	Jeb Bush	47%	6	881	± 3.2%
Emerson College	April 2–8, 2015	Hillary Clinton	56%	Ted Cruz	45%	9	881	± 3.2%
Emerson College	April 2–8, 2015	Hillary Clinton	53%	Scott Walker	47%	6	881	± 3.2%
Gravis Marketing	July 22–24, 2014	Hillary Clinton	49%	Rand Paul	40%	9	580	± 4%

== Colorado ==
9 electoral votes
(Democratic in 2008) 54%–45%
(Democratic in 2012) 51%–46%

Poll source	Date administered	Democrat	%	Republican	%	Lead margin	Sample size	Margin of error
Quinnipiac University	November 11–15, 2015	Hillary Clinton	38%	Ben Carson	52%	14	1,262	± 2.8%
Quinnipiac University	November 11–15, 2015	Hillary Clinton	37%	Donald Trump	48%	11	1,262	± 2.8%
Quinnipiac University	November 11–15, 2015	Hillary Clinton	36%	Marco Rubio	52%	16	1,262	± 2.8%
Quinnipiac University	November 11–15, 2015	Hillary Clinton	38%	Ted Cruz	51%	13	1,262	± 2.8%
Quinnipiac University	November 11–15, 2015	Bernie Sanders	40%	Ben Carson	52%	12	1,262	± 2.8%
Quinnipiac University	November 11–15, 2015	Bernie Sanders	44%	Donald Trump	46%	2	1,262	± 2.8%
Quinnipiac University	November 11–15, 2015	Bernie Sanders	39%	Marco Rubio	52%	13	1,262	± 2.8%
Quinnipiac University	November 11–15, 2015	Bernie Sanders	42%	Ted Cruz	49%	7	1,262	± 2.8%
Quinnipiac University	July 9–20, 2015	Hillary Clinton	36%	Jeb Bush	41%	5	1231	± 2.8%
Quinnipiac University	July 9–20, 2015	Hillary Clinton	38%	Scott Walker	47%	9	1231	± 2.8%
Quinnipiac University	July 9–20, 2015	Hillary Clinton	38%	Marco Rubio	46%	8	1231	± 2.8%
Quinnipiac University	July 9–20, 2015	Joe Biden	36%	Jeb Bush	45%	9	1231	± 2.8%
Quinnipiac University	July 9–20, 2015	Joe Biden	36%	Scott Walker	48%	12	1231	± 2.8%
Quinnipiac University	July 9–20, 2015	Joe Biden	35%	Marco Rubio	49%	14	1231	± 2.8%
Quinnipiac University	July 9–20, 2015	Bernie Sanders	37%	Jeb Bush	43%	6	1231	± 2.8%
Quinnipiac University	July 9–20, 2015	Bernie Sanders	36%	Scott Walker	44%	8	1231	± 2.8%
Quinnipiac University	July 9–20, 2015	Bernie Sanders	35%	Marco Rubio	46%	11	1231	± 2.8%
Quinnipiac University	March 29 – April 7, 2015	Hillary Clinton	41%	Jeb Bush	38%	3	894	± 3.3%
Quinnipiac University	March 29 – April 7, 2015	Hillary Clinton	41%	Chris Christie	39%	2	894	± 3.3%
Quinnipiac University	March 29 – April 7, 2015	Hillary Clinton	42%	Ted Cruz	41%	1	894	± 3.3%
Quinnipiac University	March 29 – April 7, 2015	Hillary Clinton	41%	Mike Huckabee	41%	Tied	894	± 3.3%
Quinnipiac University	March 29 – April 7, 2015	Hillary Clinton	41%	Rand Paul	44%	3	894	± 3.3%
Quinnipiac University	March 29 – April 7, 2015	Hillary Clinton	40%	Marco Rubio	41%	1	894	± 3.3%
Quinnipiac University	March 29 – April 7, 2015	Hillary Clinton	41%	Scott Walker	42%	1	894	± 3.3%
Quinnipiac University	February 5–15, 2015	Hillary Clinton	44%	Jeb Bush	36%	8	1,049	± 3%
Quinnipiac University	February 5–15, 2015	Hillary Clinton	43%	Chris Christie	34%	9	1,049	± 3%
Quinnipiac University	February 5–15, 2015	Hillary Clinton	44%	Mike Huckabee	39%	5	1,049	± 3%
Quinnipiac University	February 5–15, 2015	Hillary Clinton	43%	Rand Paul	41%	2	1,049	± 3%
Quinnipiac University	February 5–15, 2015	Hillary Clinton	42%	Scott Walker	40%	2	1,049	± 3%
Public Policy Polling	July 17–20, 2014	Hillary Clinton	41%	Jeb Bush	40%	1	653	± 3.8%
Public Policy Polling	July 17–20, 2014	Hillary Clinton	45%	Chris Christie	39%	6	653	± 3.8%
Public Policy Polling	July 17–20, 2014	Hillary Clinton	44%	Ted Cruz	43%	1	653	± 3.8%
Public Policy Polling	July 17–20, 2014	Hillary Clinton	45%	Mike Huckabee	43%	2	653	± 3.8%
Public Policy Polling	July 17–20, 2014	Hillary Clinton	44%	Rand Paul	45%	1	653	± 3.8%
Quinnipiac University	July 10–14, 2014	Hillary Clinton	44%	Jeb Bush	40%	4	1,147	± 2.9%
Quinnipiac University	July 10–14, 2014	Hillary Clinton	42%	Chris Christie	40%	2	1,147	± 2.9%
Quinnipiac University	July 10–14, 2014	Hillary Clinton	44%	Mike Huckabee	41%	3	1,147	± 2.9%
Quinnipiac University	July 10–14, 2014	Hillary Clinton	43%	Rand Paul	46%	3	1,147	± 2.9%
Quinnipiac University	April 15–21, 2014	Hillary Clinton	45%	Jeb Bush	40%	5	1,298	± 2.7%
Quinnipiac University	April 15–21, 2014	Hillary Clinton	42%	Chris Christie	42%	Tied	1,298	± 2.7%
Quinnipiac University	April 15–21, 2014	Hillary Clinton	45%	Mike Huckabee	44%	1	1,298	± 2.7%
Quinnipiac University	April 15–21, 2014	Hillary Clinton	43%	Rand Paul	48%	5	1,298	± 2.7%
Public Policy Polling	March 13–16, 2014	Hillary Clinton	48%	Jeb Bush	39%	9	568	± 4.1%
Public Policy Polling	March 13–16, 2014	Hillary Clinton	45%	Chris Christie	38%	7	568	± 4.1%
Public Policy Polling	March 13–16, 2014	Hillary Clinton	49%	Ted Cruz	40%	9	568	± 4.1%
Public Policy Polling	March 13–16, 2014	Hillary Clinton	48%	Mike Huckabee	41%	7	568	± 4.1%
Public Policy Polling	March 13–16, 2014	Hillary Clinton	47%	Rand Paul	44%	3	568	± 4.1%
Quinnipiac University	January 29 – February 2, 2014	Hillary Clinton	43%	Chris Christie	42%	1	1,139	± 2.9%
Quinnipiac University	January 29 – February 2, 2014	Hillary Clinton	44%	Ted Cruz	43%	1	1,139	± 2.9%
Quinnipiac University	January 29 – February 2, 2014	Hillary Clinton	43%	Rand Paul	47%	4	1,139	± 2.9%
Quinnipiac University	January 29 – February 2, 2014	Hillary Clinton	43%	Paul Ryan	48%	5	1,139	± 2.9%
Public Policy Polling	December 3–4, 2013	Hillary Clinton	47%	Jeb Bush	43%	4	928	±3.2%
Public Policy Polling	December 3–4, 2013	Hillary Clinton	39%	Chris Christie	46%	7	928	±3.2%
Public Policy Polling	December 3–4, 2013	Hillary Clinton	48%	Ted Cruz	45%	3	928	±3.2%
Public Policy Polling	December 3–4, 2013	Hillary Clinton	45%	Rand Paul	47%	2	928	±3.2%
Quinnipiac University	November 15–18, 2013	Hillary Clinton	38%	Chris Christie	46%	8	1,206	± 2.8%
Quinnipiac University	November 15–18, 2013	Hillary Clinton	44%	Ted Cruz	44%	Tied	1,206	± 2.8%
Quinnipiac University	November 15–18, 2013	Hillary Clinton	44%	Rand Paul	47%	3	1,206	± 2.8%
Quinnipiac University	November 15–18, 2013	Hillary Clinton	43%	Paul Ryan	45%	2	1,206	± 2.8%
Quinnipiac University	August 15–21, 2013	Hillary Clinton	42%	Chris Christie	43%	1	1,184	± 2.9%
Quinnipiac University	August 15–21, 2013	Hillary Clinton	45%	Ted Cruz	42%	3	1,184	± 2.9%
Quinnipiac University	August 15–21, 2013	Joe Biden	33%	Chris Christie	50%	17	1,184	± 2.9%
Quinnipiac University	August 15–21, 2013	Joe Biden	39%	Ted Cruz	45%	6	1,184	± 2.9%
Quinnipiac University	June 5–10, 2013	Hillary Clinton	41%	Chris Christie	44%	3	1,065	± 3%
Quinnipiac University	June 5–10, 2013	Hillary Clinton	45%	Marco Rubio	46%	1	1,065	± 3%
Quinnipiac University	June 5–10, 2013	Joe Biden	32%	Chris Christie	48%	16	1,065	± 3%
Quinnipiac University	June 5–10, 2013	Joe Biden	35%	Marco Rubio	48%	13	1,065	± 3%
Public Policy Polling	April 11–14, 2013	Hillary Clinton	48%	Rand Paul	45%	3	500	±4.4%
Public Policy Polling	April 11–14, 2013	Hillary Clinton	48%	Marco Rubio	44%	4	500	±4.4%
Public Policy Polling	April 11–14, 2013	John Hickenlooper	47%	Rand Paul	45%	2	500	±4.4%
Public Policy Polling	April 11–14, 2013	John Hickenlooper	47%	Marco Rubio	45%	2	500	±4.4%

== Connecticut ==
7 electoral votes
(Democratic in 2008) 61%–38%
(Democratic in 2012) 58%–41%

Poll source	Date administered	Democrat	%	Republican	%	Lead margin	Sample size	Margin of error
Quinnipiac University	October 7–11, 2015	Hillary Clinton	44%	Ben Carson	42%	2	1,735	± 2.4%
Quinnipiac University	October 7–11, 2015	Hillary Clinton	45%	Carly Fiorina	40%	5	1,735	± 2.4%
Quinnipiac University	October 7–11, 2015	Hillary Clinton	47%	Donald Trump	40%	7	1,735	± 2.4%
Quinnipiac University	October 7–11, 2015	Joe Biden	51%	Ben Carson	39%	12	1,735	± 2.4%
Quinnipiac University	October 7–11, 2015	Joe Biden	53%	Carly Fiorina	36%	17	1,735	± 2.4%
Quinnipiac University	October 7–11, 2015	Joe Biden	55%	Donald Trump	37%	18	1,735	± 2.4%
Quinnipiac University	October 7–11, 2015	Bernie Sanders	44%	Ben Carson	41%	3	1,735	± 2.4%
Quinnipiac University	October 7–11, 2015	Bernie Sanders	44%	Carly Fiorina	39%	5	1,735	± 2.4%
Quinnipiac University	October 7–11, 2015	Bernie Sanders	49%	Donald Trump	40%	9	1,735	± 2.4%
Quinnipiac University	March 6–9, 2015	Hillary Clinton	52%	Jeb Bush	34%	18	1,235	± 2.8%
Quinnipiac University	March 6–9, 2015	Hillary Clinton	52%	Chris Christie	34%	18	1,235	± 2.8%
Quinnipiac University	March 6–9, 2015	Hillary Clinton	55%	Ted Cruz	30%	25	1,235	± 2.8%
Quinnipiac University	March 6–9, 2015	Hillary Clinton	56%	Mike Huckabee	31%	25	1,235	± 2.8%
Quinnipiac University	March 6–9, 2015	Hillary Clinton	54%	Rand Paul	32%	22	1,235	± 2.8%
Quinnipiac University	March 6–9, 2015	Hillary Clinton	53%	Marco Rubio	34%	19	1,235	± 2.8%
Quinnipiac University	March 6–9, 2015	Hillary Clinton	53%	Scott Walker	33%	20	1,235	± 2.8%
Public Policy Polling	October 2–5, 2014	Hillary Clinton	50%	Jeb Bush	37%	13	861	± 3.3%
Public Policy Polling	October 2–5, 2014	Hillary Clinton	49%	Chris Christie	39%	10	861	± 3.3%
Public Policy Polling	October 2–5, 2014	Hillary Clinton	54%	Ted Cruz	32%	22	861	± 3.3%
Public Policy Polling	October 2–5, 2014	Hillary Clinton	53%	Mike Huckabee	34%	19	861	± 3.3%
Public Policy Polling	October 2–5, 2014	Hillary Clinton	54%	Rand Paul	35%	19	861	± 3.3%
Gravis Marketing	August 4–7, 2014	Hillary Clinton	45%	Ben Carson	36%	9	440	± 5%
Gravis Marketing	August 4–7, 2014	Hillary Clinton	48%	Rand Paul	33%	15	440	± 5%

== Florida ==
29 electoral votes
(Democratic in 2008) 51%–48%
(Democratic in 2012) 50%–49%

== Georgia ==
16 electoral votes
(Republican in 2008) 52%–47%
(Republican in 2012) 53%–45%

Poll source	Date administered	Democrat	%	Republican	%	Lead margin	Sample size	Margin of error
Public Policy Polling	October 2–5, 2014	Hillary Clinton	44%	Jeb Bush	45%	1	895	± 3.3%
Public Policy Polling	October 2–5, 2014	Hillary Clinton	48%	Herman Cain	45%	3	895	± 3.3%
Public Policy Polling	October 2–5, 2014	Hillary Clinton	46%	Chris Christie	41%	5	895	± 3.3%
Public Policy Polling	October 2–5, 2014	Hillary Clinton	47%	Ted Cruz	41%	6	895	± 3.3%
Public Policy Polling	October 2–5, 2014	Hillary Clinton	49%	Newt Gingrich	43%	6	895	± 3.3%
Public Policy Polling	October 2–5, 2014	Hillary Clinton	48%	Mike Huckabee	45%	3	895	± 3.3%
Public Policy Polling	October 2–5, 2014	Hillary Clinton	47%	Rand Paul	44%	3	895	± 3.3%
Public Policy Polling	August 2–5, 2013	Hillary Clinton	45%	Jeb Bush	45%	Tied	520	± 4.3%
Public Policy Polling	August 2–5, 2013	Hillary Clinton	42%	Chris Christie	44%	2	520	± 4.3%
Public Policy Polling	August 2–5, 2013	Hillary Clinton	47%	Newt Gingrich	43%	4	520	± 4.3%
Public Policy Polling	August 2–5, 2013	Hillary Clinton	51%	Sarah Palin	38%	13	520	± 4.3%
Public Policy Polling	August 2–5, 2013	Hillary Clinton	48%	Rand Paul	43%	5	520	± 4.3%
Public Policy Polling	August 2–5, 2013	Hillary Clinton	47%	Paul Ryan	44%	3	520	± 4.3%
Public Policy Polling	February 15–18, 2013	Hillary Clinton	51%	Newt Gingrich	44%	7	602	± 4%
Public Policy Polling	February 15–18, 2013	Hillary Clinton	49%	Marco Rubio	46%	3	602	± 4%
Public Policy Polling	February 15–18, 2013	Hillary Clinton	50%	Paul Ryan	45%	5	602	± 4%

== Idaho ==
4 electoral votes
(Republican in 2008) 61%–36%
(Republican in 2012) 64%–32%

Poll source	Date administered	Democrat	%	Republican	%	Lead margin	Sample size	Margin of error
Public Policy Polling	October 9–12, 2014	Hillary Clinton	33%	Jeb Bush	50%	17	522	± 4.3%
Public Policy Polling	October 9–12, 2014	Hillary Clinton	33%	Chris Christie	44%	11	522	± 4.3%
Public Policy Polling	October 9–12, 2014	Hillary Clinton	34%	Ted Cruz	50%	16	522	± 4.3%
Public Policy Polling	October 9–12, 2014	Hillary Clinton	34%	Mike Huckabee	52%	18	522	± 4.3%
Public Policy Polling	October 9–12, 2014	Hillary Clinton	33%	Rand Paul	52%	19	522	± 4.3%

== Illinois ==
20 electoral votes
(Democratic in 2008) 62%–37%
(Democratic in 2012) 58%–41%

Poll source	Date administered	Democrat	%	Republican	%	Lead margin	Sample size	Margin of error
Public Policy Polling	July 20–21, 2015	Hillary Clinton	48%	Jeb Bush	39%	9	931	± 3.2%
Public Policy Polling	July 20–21, 2015	Hillary Clinton	49%	Ben Carson	37%	12	931	± 3.2%
Public Policy Polling	July 20–21, 2015	Hillary Clinton	49%	Chris Christie	35%	14	931	± 3.2%
Public Policy Polling	July 20–21, 2015	Hillary Clinton	51%	Ted Cruz	35%	16	931	± 3.2%
Public Policy Polling	July 20–21, 2015	Hillary Clinton	49%	Carly Fiorina	34%	15	931	± 3.2%
Public Policy Polling	July 20–21, 2015	Hillary Clinton	51%	Mike Huckabee	35%	16	931	± 3.2%
Public Policy Polling	July 20–21, 2015	Hillary Clinton	47%	Rand Paul	37%	10	931	± 3.2%
Public Policy Polling	July 20–21, 2015	Hillary Clinton	49%	Marco Rubio	37%	12	931	± 3.2%
Public Policy Polling	July 20–21, 2015	Hillary Clinton	51%	Donald Trump	33%	18	931	± 3.2%
Public Policy Polling	July 20–21, 2015	Hillary Clinton	50%	Scott Walker	39%	11	931	± 3.2%
Public Policy Polling	July 20–21, 2015	Bernie Sanders	42%	Jeb Bush	37%	5	931	± 3.2%
Public Policy Polling	July 20–21, 2015	Bernie Sanders	40%	Marco Rubio	34%	6	931	± 3.2%
Public Policy Polling	July 20–21, 2015	Bernie Sanders	48%	Donald Trump	32%	16	931	± 3.2%
Public Policy Polling	July 20–21, 2015	Bernie Sanders	40%	Scott Walker	36%	4	931	± 3.2%

== Iowa ==
6 electoral votes
(Democratic in 2008) 54%–44%
(Democratic in 2012) 52%–46%

Poll source	Date administered	Democrat	%	Republican	%	Lead margin	Sample size	Margin of error
Public Policy Poling	December 10–13, 2015	Hillary Clinton	46%	Jeb Bush	41%	5	1,426	± 2.6%
Public Policy Poling	December 10–13, 2015	Hillary Clinton	45%	Ben Carson	45%	Tied	1,426	± 2.6%
Public Policy Poling	December 10–13, 2015	Hillary Clinton	44%	Ted Cruz	47%	3	1,426	± 2.6%
Public Policy Poling	December 10–13, 2015	Hillary Clinton	45%	Carly Fiorina	42%	3	1,426	± 2.6%
Public Policy Poling	December 10–13, 2015	Hillary Clinton	41%	Marco Rubio	48%	7	1,426	± 2.6%
Public Policy Poling	December 10–13, 2015	Hillary Clinton	45%	Donald Trump	43%	2	1,426	± 2.6%
Public Policy Poling	December 10–13, 2015	Bernie Sanders	44%	Jeb Bush	40%	4	1,426	± 2.6%
Public Policy Poling	December 10–13, 2015	Bernie Sanders	43%	Ben Carson	42%	1	1,426	± 2.6%
Public Policy Poling	December 10–13, 2015	Bernie Sanders	44%	Ted Cruz	43%	1	1,426	± 2.6%
Public Policy Poling	December 10–13, 2015	Bernie Sanders	45%	Carly Fiorina	39%	6	1,426	± 2.6%
Public Policy Poling	December 10–13, 2015	Bernie Sanders	42%	Marco Rubio	44%	2	1,426	± 2.6%
Public Policy Poling	December 10–13, 2015	Bernie Sanders	46%	Donald Trump	43%	3	1,426	± 2.6%
Public Policy Poling	October 30 – November 1, 2015	Hillary Clinton	45%	Jeb Bush	40%	5	1,668	± 2.4%
Public Policy Poling	October 30 – November 1, 2015	Hillary Clinton	43%	Ben Carson	47%	4	1,668	± 2.4%
Public Policy Poling	October 30 – November 1, 2015	Hillary Clinton	46%	Ted Cruz	44%	2	1,668	± 2.4%
Public Policy Poling	October 30 – November 1, 2015	Hillary Clinton	44%	Carly Fiorina	43%	1	1,668	± 2.4%
Public Policy Poling	October 30 – November 1, 2015	Hillary Clinton	46%	Mike Huckabee	44%	2	1,668	± 2.4%
Public Policy Poling	October 30 – November 1, 2015	Hillary Clinton	43%	John Kasich	36%	7	1,668	± 2.4%
Public Policy Poling	October 30 – November 1, 2015	Hillary Clinton	43%	Marco Rubio	45%	2	1,668	± 2.4%
Public Policy Poling	October 30 – November 1, 2015	Hillary Clinton	44%	Donald Trump	44%	Tied	1,668	± 2.4%
Public Policy Poling	October 30 – November 1, 2015	Bernie Sanders	41%	Jeb Bush	41%	Tied	1,668	± 2.4%
Public Policy Poling	October 30 – November 1, 2015	Bernie Sanders	37%	Ben Carson	47%	10	1,668	± 2.4%
Public Policy Poling	October 30 – November 1, 2015	Bernie Sanders	42%	Ted Cruz	43%	1	1,668	± 2.4%
Public Policy Poling	October 30 – November 1, 2015	Bernie Sanders	38%	Marco Rubio	45%	7	1,668	± 2.4%
Public Policy Poling	October 30 – November 1, 2015	Bernie Sanders	43%	Donald Trump	44%	1	1,668	± 2.4%
NBC News/Wall Street Journal/Marist	September 23–30, 2015	Hillary Clinton	40%	Jeb Bush	50%	10	1,061	± 3.0%
NBC News/Wall Street Journal/Marist	September 23–30, 2015	Hillary Clinton	41%	Donald Trump	48%	7	1,061	± 3.0%
NBC News/Wall Street Journal/Marist	September 23–30, 2015	Hillary Clinton	38%	Carly Fiorina	52%	14	1,061	± 3.0%
NBC News/Wall Street Journal/Marist	September 23–30, 2015	Bernie Sanders	44%	Jeb Bush	46%	2	1,061	± 3.0%
NBC News/Wall Street Journal/Marist	September 23–30, 2015	Bernie Sanders	48%	Donald Trump	43%	5	1,061	± 3.0%
NBC News/Wall Street Journal/Marist	September 23–30, 2015	Bernie Sanders	42%	Carly Fiorina	45%	3	1,061	± 3.0%
Public Policy Poling	September 18–20, 2015	Hillary Clinton	41%	Jeb Bush	42%	1	1,374	
Public Policy Poling	September 18–20, 2015	Hillary Clinton	37%	Ben Carson	52%	15	1,374	
Public Policy Poling	September 18–20, 2015	Hillary Clinton	43%	Ted Cruz	43%	Tied	1,374	
Public Policy Poling	September 18–20, 2015	Hillary Clinton	39%	Carly Fiorina	47%	8	1,374	
Public Policy Poling	September 18–20, 2015	Hillary Clinton	43%	Mike Huckabee	44%	1	1,374	
Public Policy Poling	September 18–20, 2015	Hillary Clinton	41%	John Kasich	39%	2	1,374	
Public Policy Poling	September 18–20, 2015	Hillary Clinton	41%	Marco Rubio	45%	4	1,374	
Public Policy Poling	September 18–20, 2015	Hillary Clinton	43%	Donald Trump	44%	1	1,374	
Public Policy Poling	September 18–20, 2015	Hillary Clinton	43%	Scott Walker	44%	1	1,374	
Public Policy Poling	September 18–20, 2015	Joe Biden	44%	Jeb Bush	40%	4	1,374	
Public Policy Poling	September 18–20, 2015	Joe Biden	38%	Ben Carson	47%	9	1,374	
Public Policy Poling	September 18–20, 2015	Joe Biden	46%	Donald Trump	44%	2	1,374	
Public Policy Poling	September 18–20, 2015	Bernie Sanders	42%	Jeb Bush	40%	2	1,374	
Public Policy Poling	September 18–20, 2015	Bernie Sanders	34%	Ben Carson	48%	14	1,374	
Public Policy Poling	September 18–20, 2015	Bernie Sanders	44%	Donald Trump	44%	Tied	1,374	
NBC News/Marist	August 26 – September 2, 2015	Hillary Clinton	39%	Jeb Bush	50%	11	998	± 3.1%
NBC News/Marist	August 26 – September 2, 2015	Hillary Clinton	43%	Donald Trump	48%	5	998	± 3.1%
NBC News/Marist	August 26 – September 2, 2015	Joe Biden	44%	Jeb Bush	46%	2	998	± 3.1%
NBC News/Marist	August 26 – September 2, 2015	Joe Biden	49%	Donald Trump	45%	4	998	± 3.1%
Public Policy Poling	August 7–9, 2015	Hillary Clinton	44%	Jeb Bush	40%	4	1,500	± 2.5%
Public Policy Poling	August 7–9, 2015	Hillary Clinton	40%	Ben Carson	44%	4	1,500	± 2.5%
Public Policy Poling	August 7–9, 2015	Hillary Clinton	41%	Chris Christie	39%	2	1,500	± 2.5%
Public Policy Poling	August 7–9, 2015	Hillary Clinton	44%	Ted Cruz	42%	2	1,500	± 2.5%
Public Policy Poling	August 7–9, 2015	Hillary Clinton	42%	Carly Fiorina	40%	2	1,500	± 2.5%
Public Policy Poling	August 7–9, 2015	Hillary Clinton	43%	Mike Huckabee	44%	1	1,500	± 2.5%
Public Policy Poling	August 7–9, 2015	Hillary Clinton	41%	John Kasich	39%	2	1,500	± 2.5%
Public Policy Poling	August 7–9, 2015	Hillary Clinton	43%	Rand Paul	40%	3	1,500	± 2.5%
Public Policy Poling	August 7–9, 2015	Hillary Clinton	42%	Marco Rubio	43%	1	1,500	± 2.5%
Public Policy Poling	August 7–9, 2015	Hillary Clinton	43%	Donald Trump	40%	3	1,500	± 2.5%
Public Policy Poling	August 7–9, 2015	Hillary Clinton	43%	Scott Walker	44%	1	1,500	± 2.5%
Public Policy Poling	August 7–9, 2015	Bernie Sanders	41%	Jeb Bush	40%	1	1,500	± 2.5%
Public Policy Poling	August 7–9, 2015	Bernie Sanders	38%	Marco Rubio	39%	1	1,500	± 2.5%
Public Policy Poling	August 7–9, 2015	Bernie Sanders	44%	Donald Trump	40%	4	1,500	± 2.5%
Public Policy Poling	August 7–9, 2015	Bernie Sanders	40%	Scott Walker	40%	Tied	1,500	± 2.5%
Quinnipiac University	July 9–20, 2015	Hillary Clinton	36%	Jeb Bush	42%	6	1,236	± 2.8%
Quinnipiac University	July 9–20, 2015	Hillary Clinton	37%	Scott Walker	45%	8	1,236	± 2.8%
Quinnipiac University	July 9–20, 2015	Hillary Clinton	36%	Marco Rubio	44%	8	1,236	± 2.8%
Quinnipiac University	July 9–20, 2015	Joe Biden	37%	Jeb Bush	44%	7	1,236	± 2.8%
Quinnipiac University	July 9–20, 2015	Joe Biden	36%	Scott Walker	47%	11	1,236	± 2.8%
Quinnipiac University	July 9–20, 2015	Joe Biden	37%	Marco Rubio	45%	8	1,236	± 2.8%
Quinnipiac University	July 9–20, 2015	Bernie Sanders	38%	Jeb Bush	42%	4	1,236	± 2.8%
Quinnipiac University	July 9–20, 2015	Bernie Sanders	36%	Scott Walker	44%	8	1,236	± 2.8%
Quinnipiac University	July 9–20, 2015	Bernie Sanders	36%	Marco Rubio	43%	7	1,236	± 2.8%
Public Policy Polling	April 23–26, 2015	Hillary Clinton	45%	Jeb Bush	42%	3	1,219	± 2.8%
Public Policy Polling	April 23–26, 2015	Hillary Clinton	48%	Ben Carson	41%	7	1,219	± 2.8%
Public Policy Polling	April 23–26, 2015	Hillary Clinton	45%	Chris Christie	40%	5	1,219	± 2.8%
Public Policy Polling	April 23–26, 2015	Hillary Clinton	49%	Ted Cruz	42%	7	1,219	± 2.8%
Public Policy Polling	April 23–26, 2015	Hillary Clinton	46%	Mike Huckabee	44%	2	1,219	± 2.8%
Public Policy Polling	April 23–26, 2015	Hillary Clinton	45%	Rand Paul	43%	2	1,219	± 2.8%
Public Policy Polling	April 23–26, 2015	Hillary Clinton	48%	Rick Perry	41%	7	1,219	± 2.8%
Public Policy Polling	April 23–26, 2015	Hillary Clinton	46%	Marco Rubio	44%	2	1,219	± 2.8%
Public Policy Polling	April 23–26, 2015	Hillary Clinton	48%	Scott Walker	41%	7	1,219	± 2.8%
Public Policy Polling	April 23–26, 2015	Lincoln Chafee	29%	Scott Walker	39%	10	1,219	± 2.8%
Public Policy Polling	April 23–26, 2015	Martin O'Malley	32%	Scott Walker	38%	6	1,219	± 2.8%
Public Policy Polling	April 23–26, 2015	Bernie Sanders	34%	Scott Walker	39%	5	1,219	± 2.8%
Public Policy Polling	April 23–26, 2015	Jim Webb	32%	Scott Walker	39%	7	1,219	± 2.8%
Gravis Marketing	April 13, 2015	Hillary Clinton	43%	Jeb Bush	40%	3	1,259	± 3%
Gravis Marketing	April 13, 2015	Hillary Clinton	45%	Ben Carson	37%	8	1,259	± 3%
Gravis Marketing	April 13, 2015	Hillary Clinton	42%	Chris Christie	39%	3	1,259	± 3%
Gravis Marketing	April 13, 2015	Hillary Clinton	47%	Ted Cruz	40%	7	1,259	± 3%
Gravis Marketing	April 13, 2015	Hillary Clinton	44%	Carly Fiorina	37%	7	1,259	± 3%
Gravis Marketing	April 13, 2015	Hillary Clinton	44%	Mike Huckabee	43%	1	1,259	± 3%
Gravis Marketing	April 13, 2015	Hillary Clinton	44%	Rand Paul	43%	1	1,259	± 3%
Gravis Marketing	April 13, 2015	Hillary Clinton	40%	Condoleezza Rice	43%	3	1,259	± 3%
Gravis Marketing	April 13, 2015	Hillary Clinton	45%	Marco Rubio	42%	3	1,259	± 3%
Gravis Marketing	April 13, 2015	Hillary Clinton	46%	Scott Walker	41%	5	1,259	± 3%
Quinnipiac University	March 29 – April 7, 2015	Hillary Clinton	41%	Jeb Bush	40%	1	948	± 3.2%
Quinnipiac University	March 29 – April 7, 2015	Hillary Clinton	41%	Chris Christie	39%	2	948	± 3.2%
Quinnipiac University	March 29 – April 7, 2015	Hillary Clinton	43%	Ted Cruz	40%	3	948	± 3.2%
Quinnipiac University	March 29 – April 7, 2015	Hillary Clinton	42%	Mike Huckabee	42%	Tied	948	± 3.2%
Quinnipiac University	March 29 – April 7, 2015	Hillary Clinton	42%	Rand Paul	43%	1	948	± 3.2%
Quinnipiac University	March 29 – April 7, 2015	Hillary Clinton	43%	Marco Rubio	40%	3	948	± 3.2%
Quinnipiac University	March 29 – April 7, 2015	Hillary Clinton	44%	Scott Walker	40%	4	948	± 3.2%
Quinnipiac University	February 5–15, 2015	Hillary Clinton	45%	Jeb Bush	35%	10	1,089	± 3%
Quinnipiac University	February 5–15, 2015	Hillary Clinton	44%	Chris Christie	34%	10	1,089	± 3%
Quinnipiac University	February 5–15, 2015	Hillary Clinton	45%	Mike Huckabee	38%	7	1,089	± 3%
Quinnipiac University	February 5–15, 2015	Hillary Clinton	45%	Rand Paul	37%	8	1,089	± 3%
Quinnipiac University	February 5–15, 2015	Hillary Clinton	45%	Scott Walker	35%	10	1,089	± 3%
Gravis Marketing	February 12–13, 2015	Hillary Clinton	43%	Jeb Bush	37%	6	343	± 4%
Gravis Marketing	February 12–13, 2015	Hillary Clinton	45%	Chris Christie	35%	10	343	± 4%
Gravis Marketing	February 12–13, 2015	Hillary Clinton	45%	Mike Huckabee	40%	5	343	± 4%
Gravis Marketing	February 12–13, 2015	Hillary Clinton	44%	Rand Paul	39%	5	343	± 4%
Gravis Marketing	February 12–13, 2015	Hillary Clinton	47%	Scott Walker	41%	6	343	± 4%
NBC News/Marist	February 3–10, 2015	Hillary Clinton	48%	Jeb Bush	40%	8	891	± 3.3%
NBC News/Marist	February 3–10, 2015	Hillary Clinton	49%	Scott Walker	38%	11	891	± 3.3%
Ipsos/Reuters	October 23–29, 2014	Hillary Clinton	44%	Jeb Bush	36%	8	1,129	± 3.3%
Ipsos/Reuters	October 23–29, 2014	Hillary Clinton	40%	Chris Christie	37%	3	1,129	± 3.3%
Ipsos/Reuters	October 23–29, 2014	Hillary Clinton	43%	Rand Paul	36%	7	1,129	± 3.3%
Ipsos/Reuters	October 23–29, 2014	Hillary Clinton	42%	Paul Ryan	41%	1	1,129	± 3.3%
Ipsos/Reuters	October 23–29, 2014	Joe Biden	33%	Jeb Bush	40%	7	1,129	± 3.3%
Ipsos/Reuters	October 23–29, 2014	Joe Biden	30%	Chris Christie	41%	11	1,129	± 3.3%
Ipsos/Reuters	October 23–29, 2014	Joe Biden	33%	Rand Paul	39%	6	1,129	± 3.3%
Ipsos/Reuters	October 23–29, 2014	Joe Biden	32%	Paul Ryan	45%	13	1,129	± 3.3%
Ipsos/Reuters	October 23–29, 2014	Andrew Cuomo	30%	Jeb Bush	36%	6	1,129	± 3.3%
Ipsos/Reuters	October 23–29, 2014	Andrew Cuomo	24%	Chris Christie	39%	15	1,129	± 3.3%
Ipsos/Reuters	October 23–29, 2014	Andrew Cuomo	30%	Rand Paul	37%	7	1,129	± 3.3%
Ipsos/Reuters	October 23–29, 2014	Andrew Cuomo	27%	Paul Ryan	41%	14	1,129	± 3.3%
Gravis Marketing	October 20–21, 2014	Hillary Clinton	42.6%	Jeb Bush	43.5%	0.9	964	± 3%
Gravis Marketing	October 20–21, 2014	Hillary Clinton	45%	Paul Ryan	44%	1	964	± 3%
Gravis Marketing	September 29–30, 2014	Hillary Clinton	41%	Jeb Bush	41%	Tied	522	± 4%
Gravis Marketing	September 29–30, 2014	Hillary Clinton	44%	Paul Ryan	44%	Tied	522	± 4%
Public Policy Polling	September 25–28, 2014	Hillary Clinton	43%	Jeb Bush	43%	Tied	1,192	± 2.8%
Public Policy Polling	September 25–28, 2014	Hillary Clinton	45%	Chris Christie	41%	4	1,192	± 2.8%
Public Policy Polling	September 25–28, 2014	Hillary Clinton	47%	Ted Cruz	39%	8	1,192	± 2.8%
Public Policy Polling	September 25–28, 2014	Hillary Clinton	46%	Mike Huckabee	42%	4	1,192	± 2.8%
Public Policy Polling	September 25–28, 2014	Hillary Clinton	47%	Rand Paul	42%	5	1,192	± 2.8%
NBC News/Marist	July 7–13, 2014	Hillary Clinton	46%	Jeb Bush	42%	4	753	± 3.6%
NBC News/Marist	July 7–13, 2014	Hillary Clinton	44%	Chris Christie	43%	1	753	± 3.6%
NBC News/Marist	July 7–13, 2014	Hillary Clinton	49%	Ted Cruz	37%	12	832	± 3.4%
NBC News/Marist	July 7–13, 2014	Hillary Clinton	45%	Rand Paul	45%	Tied	753	± 3.6%
NBC News/Marist	July 7–13, 2014	Hillary Clinton	49%	Marco Rubio	40%	9	832	± 3.4%
NBC News/Marist	July 7–13, 2014	Hillary Clinton	50%	Scott Walker	37%	13	832	± 3.4%
Quinnipiac University	June 12–16, 2014	Hillary Clinton	49%	Jeb Bush	36%	13	1,277	± 2.7%
Quinnipiac University	June 12–16, 2014	Hillary Clinton	44%	Chris Christie	36%	8	1,277	± 2.7%
Quinnipiac University	June 12–16, 2014	Hillary Clinton	46%	Mike Huckabee	39%	7	1,277	± 2.7%
Quinnipiac University	June 12–16, 2014	Hillary Clinton	46%	Rand Paul	40%	6	1,277	± 2.7%
Quinnipiac University	June 12–16, 2014	Hillary Clinton	47%	Paul Ryan	41%	6	1,277	± 2.7%
Loras College	June 4–5, 2014	Hillary Clinton	48.7%	Jeb Bush	38.2%	5	600	± 4.0%
Loras College	June 4–5, 2014	Hillary Clinton	47.5%	Chris Christie	39%	8.5	600	± 4.0%
Loras College	June 4–5, 2014	Hillary Clinton	49.7%	Mike Huckabee	39.8%	9.9	600	± 4.0%
Loras College	June 4–5, 2014	Hillary Clinton	52%	Rand Paul	37.5%	14.5	600	± 4.0%
Loras College	June 4–5, 2014	Hillary Clinton	50%	Paul Ryan	38.7%	11.3	600	± 4.0%
Public Policy Polling	May 15–19, 2014	Hillary Clinton	44%	Jeb Bush	39%	5	914	± 3.2%
Public Policy Polling	May 15–19, 2014	Hillary Clinton	45%	Chris Christie	39%	6	914	± 3.2%
Public Policy Polling	May 15–19, 2014	Hillary Clinton	47%	Ted Cruz	40%	7	914	± 3.2%
Public Policy Polling	May 15–19, 2014	Hillary Clinton	46%	Mike Huckabee	42%	4	914	± 3.2%
Public Policy Polling	May 15–19, 2014	Hillary Clinton	46%	Rand Paul	42%	4	914	± 3.2%
Quinnipiac University	March 5–10, 2014	Hillary Clinton	51%	Jeb Bush	37%	14	1,411	± 2.6%
Quinnipiac University	March 5–10, 2014	Hillary Clinton	48%	Chris Christie	35%	13	1,411	± 2.6%
Quinnipiac University	March 5–10, 2014	Hillary Clinton	51%	Ted Cruz	35%	16	1,411	± 2.6%
Quinnipiac University	March 5–10, 2014	Hillary Clinton	49%	Rand Paul	39%	10	1,411	± 2.6%
Public Policy Polling	February 20–23, 2014	Hillary Clinton	45%	Jeb Bush	41%	4	869	± 3.3%
Public Policy Polling	February 20–23, 2014	Hillary Clinton	46%	Mike Huckabee	42%	4	869	± 3.3%
Public Policy Polling	February 20–23, 2014	Hillary Clinton	47%	Rand Paul	42%	5	869	± 3.3%
Public Policy Polling	February 20–23, 2014	Hillary Clinton	45%	Chris Christie	39%	6	869	± 3.3%
Quinnipiac University	December 10–15, 2013	Hillary Clinton	40%	Chris Christie	45%	5	1,617	± 2.4%
Quinnipiac University	December 10–15, 2013	Hillary Clinton	45%	Rand Paul	41%	4	1,617	± 2.4%
Quinnipiac University	December 10–15, 2013	Hillary Clinton	47%	Jeb Bush	40%	7	1,617	± 2.4%
Quinnipiac University	December 10–15, 2013	Hillary Clinton	48%	Ted Cruz	41%	7	1,617	± 2.4%
Harper Polling	November 23–24, 2013	Hillary Clinton	38.12%	Chris Christie	43.35%	5.23	985	± 3.12%
Harper Polling	November 23–24, 2013	Hillary Clinton	46.40%	Paul Ryan	42.57%	3.83	985	± 3.12%
Harper Polling	November 23–24, 2013	Hillary Clinton	45.21%	Marco Rubio	40.79%	4.42	985	± 3.12%
Harper Polling	November 23–24, 2013	Hillary Clinton	46.82%	Rand Paul	41.06%	5.76	985	± 3.12%
Harper Polling	November 23–24, 2013	Hillary Clinton	47.37%	Ted Cruz	40.45%	6.92	985	± 3.12%
Quinnipiac University	July 15–17, 2013	Hillary Clinton	41%	Chris Christie	41%	Tied	1,256	± 2.8%
Quinnipiac University	July 15–17, 2013	Hillary Clinton	46%	Scott Walker	39%	7	1,256	± 2.8%
Quinnipiac University	July 15–17, 2013	Joe Biden	32%	Chris Christie	49%	17	1,256	± 2.8%
Quinnipiac University	July 15–17, 2013	Joe Biden	39%	Scott Walker	42%	3	1,256	± 2.8%
Public Policy Polling	July 5–7, 2013	Hillary Clinton	43%	Chris Christie	36%	7	668	± 3.8%
Public Policy Polling	July 5–7, 2013	Hillary Clinton	49%	Paul Ryan	40%	9	668	± 3.8%
Public Policy Polling	July 5–7, 2013	Hillary Clinton	48%	Rand Paul	37%	11	668	± 3.8%
Public Policy Polling	July 5–7, 2013	Hillary Clinton	47%	Marco Rubio	35%	12	668	± 3.8%
Public Policy Polling	July 5–7, 2013	Hillary Clinton	50%	Jeb Bush	36%	14	668	± 3.8%
Quinnipiac University	May 15–21, 2013	Hillary Clinton	46%	Rand Paul	42%	4	1,411	± 2.6%
Quinnipiac University	May 15–21, 2013	Hillary Clinton	48%	Marco Rubio	37%	11	1,411	± 2.6%
Quinnipiac University	May 15–21, 2013	Joe Biden	39%	Rand Paul	44%	5	1,411	± 2.6%
Quinnipiac University	May 15–21, 2013	Joe Biden	39%	Marco Rubio	40%	1	1,411	± 2.6%
Public Policy Polling	January 31–February 3, 2013	Hillary Clinton	46%	Chris Christie	41%	5	800	± 3.5%
Public Policy Polling	January 31–February 3, 2013	Hillary Clinton	49%	Jeb Bush	43%	6	800	± 3.5%
Public Policy Polling	January 31–February 3, 2013	Hillary Clinton	50%	Paul Ryan	44%	6	800	± 3.5%
Public Policy Polling	January 31–February 3, 2013	Hillary Clinton	49%	Marco Rubio	41%	8	800	± 3.5%
Public Policy Polling	January 31–February 3, 2013	Joe Biden	44%	Chris Christie	44%	Tied	800	± 3.5%
Public Policy Polling	January 31–February 3, 2013	Joe Biden	48%	Jeb Bush	45%	3	800	± 3.5%
Public Policy Polling	January 31–February 3, 2013	Joe Biden	49%	Paul Ryan	45%	4	800	± 3.5%
Public Policy Polling	January 31–February 3, 2013	Joe Biden	48%	Marco Rubio	43%	5	800	± 3.5%

Three-way race

Poll Source	Date administered	Democrat	%	Republican	%	Independent/ Third-party candidate	%	Lead margin	Sample size	Margin of error
Public Policy Poling	December 10–13, 2015	Hillary Clinton	41%	Ted Cruz	33%	Donald Trump	20%	8	1,426	± 2.6%
Public Policy Poling	December 10–13, 2015	Hillary Clinton	39%	Marco Rubio	33%	Donald Trump	23%	6	1,426	± 2.6%
Public Policy Poling	October 30 – November 1, 2015	Hillary Clinton	41%	Donald Trump	40%	Jim Webb	9%	1	1,668	± 2.4%
Public Policy Polling	September 18–20, 2015	Hillary Clinton	38%	Jeb Bush	26%	Donald Trump	27%	11	1,374	
Public Policy Polling	August 7–9, 2015	Hillary Clinton	39%	Jeb Bush	30%	Donald Trump	21%	9	1,500	2.5%

== Kansas ==
6 electoral votes
(Republican in 2008) 56%–42%
(Republican in 2012) 60%–38%

Poll source	Date administered	Democrat	%	Republican	%	Lead margin	Sample size	Margin of error
Gravis Marketing	October 20–21, 2014	Hillary Clinton	38%	Jeb Bush	49%	11	1,124	± 3%
Gravis Marketing	October 20–21, 2014	Hillary Clinton	37%	Rand Paul	50%	13	1,124	± 3%
Public Policy Polling	October 9–12, 2014	Hillary Clinton	37%	Jeb Bush	48%	11	1,081	± 3%
Public Policy Polling	October 9–12, 2014	Hillary Clinton	38%	Chris Christie	42%	4	1,081	± 3%
Public Policy Polling	October 9–12, 2014	Hillary Clinton	41%	Ted Cruz	44%	3	1,081	± 3%
Public Policy Polling	October 9–12, 2014	Hillary Clinton	41%	Mike Huckabee	47%	6	1,081	± 3%
Public Policy Polling	October 9–12, 2014	Hillary Clinton	40%	Rand Paul	45%	5	1,081	± 3%
Gravis Marketing	September 30 – October 1, 2014	Hillary Clinton	38%	Jeb Bush	49%	11	850	± 3%
Gravis Marketing	September 30 – October 1, 2014	Hillary Clinton	38%	Rand Paul	48%	10	850	± 3%
Public Policy Polling	September 11–14, 2014	Hillary Clinton	40%	Jeb Bush	46%	6	1,328	± 2.7%
Public Policy Polling	September 11–14, 2014	Hillary Clinton	40%	Chris Christie	42%	2	1,328	± 2.7%
Public Policy Polling	September 11–14, 2014	Hillary Clinton	44%	Ted Cruz	41%	3	1,328	± 2.7%
Public Policy Polling	September 11–14, 2014	Hillary Clinton	42%	Mike Huckabee	45%	3	1,328	± 2.7%
Public Policy Polling	September 11–14, 2014	Hillary Clinton	41%	Rand Paul	43%	2	1,328	± 2.7%
Public Policy Polling	August 14–17, 2014	Hillary Clinton	39%	Jeb Bush	45%	6	903	± 3.3%
Public Policy Polling	August 14–17, 2014	Hillary Clinton	38%	Chris Christie	42%	4	903	± 3.3%
Public Policy Polling	August 14–17, 2014	Hillary Clinton	42%	Ted Cruz	43%	1	903	± 3.3%
Public Policy Polling	August 14–17, 2014	Hillary Clinton	41%	Mike Huckabee	46%	5	903	± 3.3%
Public Policy Polling	August 14–17, 2014	Hillary Clinton	41%	Rand Paul	45%	4	903	± 3.3%
Public Policy Polling	February 18–20, 2014	Hillary Clinton	41%	Jeb Bush	50%	9	693	± 3.7%
Public Policy Polling	February 18–20, 2014	Hillary Clinton	39%	Chris Christie	46%	7	693	± 3.7%
Public Policy Polling	February 18–20, 2014	Hillary Clinton	42%	Mike Huckabee	49%	7	693	± 3.7%
Public Policy Polling	February 18–20, 2014	Hillary Clinton	41%	Rand Paul	48%	7	693	± 3.7%
Public Policy Polling	February 21–24, 2013	Hillary Clinton	42%	Marco Rubio	47%	5	1,229	±2.8%
Public Policy Polling	February 21–24, 2013	Hillary Clinton	43%	Paul Ryan	50%	7	1,229	±2.8%

== Kentucky ==
8 electoral votes
(Republican in 2008) 57%–41%
(Republican in 2012) 60%–38%

Poll source	Date administered	Democrat	%	Republican	%	Lead margin	Sample size	Margin of error
Public Policy Polling	June 18–21, 2015	Hillary Clinton	40%	Jeb Bush	48%	8	1,108	± 2.9%
Public Policy Polling	June 18–21, 2015	Hillary Clinton	40%	Ben Carson	49%	9	1,108	± 2.9%
Public Policy Polling	June 18–21, 2015	Hillary Clinton	42%	Ted Cruz	48%	6	1,108	± 2.9%
Public Policy Polling	June 18–21, 2015	Hillary Clinton	40%	Carly Fiorina	45%	5	1,108	± 2.9%
Public Policy Polling	June 18–21, 2015	Hillary Clinton	39%	Mike Huckabee	49%	10	1,108	± 2.9%
Public Policy Polling	June 18–21, 2015	Hillary Clinton	40%	Rand Paul	50%	10	1,108	± 2.9%
Public Policy Polling	June 18–21, 2015	Hillary Clinton	41%	Marco Rubio	46%	5	1,108	± 2.9%
Public Policy Polling	June 18–21, 2015	Hillary Clinton	45%	Donald Trump	42%	3	1,108	± 2.9%
Public Policy Polling	June 18–21, 2015	Hillary Clinton	41%	Scott Walker	46%	5	1,108	± 2.9%
Public Policy Polling	June 18–21, 2015	Lincoln Chafee	23%	Scott Walker	41%	18	1,108	± 2.9%
Public Policy Polling	June 18–21, 2015	Martin O'Malley	22%	Scott Walker	40%	18	1,108	± 2.9%
Public Policy Polling	June 18–21, 2015	Bernie Sanders	29%	Scott Walker	42%	13	1,108	± 2.9%
Public Policy Polling	June 18–21, 2015	Jim Webb	22%	Scott Walker	42%	20	1,108	± 2.9%
Gravis Marketing	October 11–12, 2014	Hillary Clinton	45%	Rand Paul	48%	3	1,020	± 3%
Gravis Marketing	October 11–12, 2014	Elizabeth Warren	36%	Rand Paul	49%	13	1,020	± 3%
Public Policy Polling	August 7–10, 2014	Hillary Clinton	43%	Jeb Bush	48%	5	991	± 3.1%
Public Policy Polling	August 7–10, 2014	Hillary Clinton	44%	Chris Christie	41%	3	991	± 3.1%
Public Policy Polling	August 7–10, 2014	Hillary Clinton	46%	Ted Cruz	41%	5	991	± 3.1%
Public Policy Polling	August 7–10, 2014	Hillary Clinton	44%	Mike Huckabee	47%	3	991	± 3.1%
Public Policy Polling	August 7–10, 2014	Hillary Clinton	43%	Rand Paul	49%	6	991	± 3.1%
Gravis Marketing	July 17–20, 2014	Hillary Clinton	44%	Rand Paul	50%	6	1,054	± 3%
Gravis Marketing	July 17–20, 2014	Elizabeth Warren	34%	Rand Paul	52%	18	1,054	± 3%
SurveyUSA	May 14–16, 2014	Hillary Clinton	44%	Rand Paul	48%	4	1,782	± 2.4%
Public Policy Polling	December 12–15, 2013	Hillary Clinton	42%	Jeb Bush	46%	4	1,509	± 2.5%
Public Policy Polling	December 12–15, 2013	Hillary Clinton	40%	Chris Christie	44%	4	1,509	± 2.5%
Public Policy Polling	December 12–15, 2013	Hillary Clinton	44%	Ted Cruz	41%	3	1,509	± 2.5%
Public Policy Polling	December 12–15, 2013	Hillary Clinton	43%	Rand Paul	49%	6	1,509	± 2.5%
Public Policy Polling	April 5–7, 2013	Hillary Clinton	45%	Rand Paul	45%	Tied	1,052	± 3%
Public Policy Polling	April 5–7, 2013	Hillary Clinton	46%	Marco Rubio	40%	6	1,052	± 3%

== Louisiana ==
8 electoral votes
(Republican in 2008) 59%–40%
(Republican in 2012) 58%–41%

Poll source	Date administered	Democrat	%	Republican	%	Lead margin	Sample size	Margin of error
WWL-TV/Clarus	September 20–23, 2015	Hillary Clinton	45%	Bobby Jindal	42%	3	800	± 3.46%
WWL-TV/Clarus	September 20–23, 2015	Hillary Clinton	38%	Jeb Bush	56%	18	800	± 3.46%
WWL-TV/Clarus	September 20–23, 2015	Hillary Clinton	39%	Donald Trump	47%	8	800	± 3.46%
Public Policy Polling	September 25–28, 2014	Hillary Clinton	41%	Jeb Bush	49%	8	1,141	± 2.9%
Public Policy Polling	September 25–28, 2014	Hillary Clinton	44%	Chris Christie	42%	2	1,141	± 2.9%
Public Policy Polling	September 25–28, 2014	Hillary Clinton	44%	Ted Cruz	47%	3	1,141	± 2.9%
Public Policy Polling	September 25–28, 2014	Hillary Clinton	43%	Mike Huckabee	50%	7	1,141	± 2.9%
Public Policy Polling	September 25–28, 2014	Hillary Clinton	46%	Bobby Jindal	45%	1	1,141	± 2.9%
Public Policy Polling	September 25–28, 2014	Hillary Clinton	43%	Rand Paul	47%	4	1,141	± 2.9%
Gravis Marketing	September 5–9, 2014	Hillary Clinton	43%	Jeb Bush	48%	5	426	± 5%
Gravis Marketing	September 5–9, 2014	Hillary Clinton	44%	Rand Paul	45%	1	426	± 5%
Public Policy Polling	June 26–29, 2014	Hillary Clinton	45%	Jeb Bush	46%	1	664	± 3.8%
Public Policy Polling	June 26–29, 2014	Hillary Clinton	46%	Chris Christie	42%	4	664	± 3.8%
Public Policy Polling	June 26–29, 2014	Hillary Clinton	46%	Ted Cruz	45%	1	664	± 3.8%
Public Policy Polling	June 26–29, 2014	Hillary Clinton	45%	Mike Huckabee	46%	1	664	± 3.8%
Public Policy Polling	June 26–29, 2014	Hillary Clinton	48%	Bobby Jindal	44%	4	664	± 3.8%
Public Policy Polling	June 26–29, 2014	Hillary Clinton	46%	Rand Paul	46%	Tied	664	± 3.8%
Magellan Strategies	March 24–26, 2014	Hillary Clinton	40.4%	Bobby Jindal	45%	4.6	600	± 4.1%
Public Policy Polling	February 6–9, 2014	Hillary Clinton	43%	Jeb Bush	50%	7	635	± 3.9%
Public Policy Polling	February 6–9, 2014	Hillary Clinton	43%	Chris Christie	44%	1	635	± 3.9%
Public Policy Polling	February 6–9, 2014	Hillary Clinton	44%	Mike Huckabee	49%	5	635	± 3.9%
Public Policy Polling	February 6–9, 2014	Hillary Clinton	45%	Bobby Jindal	47%	2	635	± 3.9%
Public Policy Polling	February 6–9, 2014	Hillary Clinton	43%	Rand Paul	47%	4	635	± 3.9%
Public Policy Polling	August 16–19, 2013	Hillary Clinton	44%	Jeb Bush	44%	Tied	721	± 3.7%
Public Policy Polling	August 16–19, 2013	Hillary Clinton	42%	Chris Christie	41%	1	721	± 3.7%
Public Policy Polling	August 16–19, 2013	Hillary Clinton	47%	Bobby Jindal	40%	7	721	± 3.7%
Public Policy Polling	August 16–19, 2013	Hillary Clinton	44%	Rand Paul	45%	1	721	± 3.7%
Public Policy Polling	August 16–19, 2013	Hillary Clinton	44%	Paul Ryan	46%	2	721	± 3.7%
Harper Polling	August 14–15, 2013	Hillary Clinton	44%	Bobby Jindal	42%	2	596	± 4.01%
Public Policy Polling	February 8–12, 2013	Hillary Clinton	48%	Bobby Jindal	45%	3	603	± 4%
Public Policy Polling	February 8–12, 2013	Hillary Clinton	46%	Marco Rubio	43%	3	603	± 4%
Public Policy Polling	February 8–12, 2013	Hillary Clinton	46%	Paul Ryan	46%	Tied	603	± 4%

== Maine ==
4 electoral votes
(Democratic in 2008) 58%–40%
(Democratic in 2012) 56%–41%

Poll source	Date administered	Democrat	%	Republican	%	Lead margin	Sample size	Margin of error
Public Policy Polling	November 8–11, 2013	Hillary Clinton	55%	Jeb Bush	32%	23	964	±3.2%
Public Policy Polling	November 8–11, 2013	Hillary Clinton	47%	Chris Christie	39%	8	964	±3.2%
Public Policy Polling	November 8–11, 2013	Hillary Clinton	57%	Ted Cruz	30%	27	964	±3.2%
Public Policy Polling	November 8–11, 2013	Hillary Clinton	57%	Rand Paul	32%	25	964	±3.2%

== Maryland ==
10 electoral votes
(Democratic in 2008) 62%–36%
(Democratic in 2012) 62%–36%

Poll source	Date administered	Democrat	%	Republican	%	Lead margin	Sample size	Margin of error
Gravis Marketing	October 6–9, 2014	Hillary Clinton	52%	Jeb Bush	35%	17	784	± 3.5%
Gravis Marketing	October 6–9, 2014	Hillary Clinton	51%	Rand Paul	34%	17	784	± 3.5%
Gravis Marketing	October 6–9, 2014	Hillary Clinton	51%	Paul Ryan	36%	15	784	± 3.5%

== Massachusetts ==
11 electoral votes
(Democratic in 2008) 62%–36%
(Democratic in 2012) 61%–38%

Poll source	Date administered	Democrat	%	Republican	%	Lead margin	Sample size	Margin of error
Western New England University	October 1–8, 2015	Hillary Clinton	64%	Donald Trump	27%	37	425	± 5%
Western New England University	October 1–8, 2015	Hillary Clinton	58%	Jeb Bush	31%	27	425	± 5%
Western New England University	October 1–8, 2015	Hillary Clinton	61%	Carly Fiorina	29%	32	425	± 5%
Western New England University	October 1–8, 2015	Bernie Sanders	63%	Donald Trump	28%	35	425	± 5%
Western New England University	October 1–8, 2015	Bernie Sanders	57%	Jeb Bush	30%	27	425	± 5%
Western New England University	October 1–8, 2015	Hillary Clinton	59%	Carly Fiorina	29%	30	425	± 5%
Emerson College	March 14–19, 2015	Hillary Clinton	59%	Jeb Bush	38%	21	797	± 3.4%
Emerson College	March 14–19, 2015	Hillary Clinton	60%	Rand Paul	36%	24	797	± 3.4%
Emerson College	March 14–19, 2015	Hillary Clinton	58%	Scott Walker	38%	20	797	± 3.4%

== Michigan ==
16 electoral votes
(Democratic in 2008) 57%–41%
(Democratic in 2012) 54%–45%

Poll source	Date administered	Democrat	%	Republican	%	Lead margin	Sample size	Margin of error
FOX 2 Detroit/Mitchell Research	September 27, 2015	Hillary Clinton	40%	Marco Rubio	43%	3%	1,483	± 2.5%
FOX 2 Detroit/Mitchell Research	September 27, 2015	Hillary Clinton	42%	Donald Trump	42%	Tied	1,483	± 2.5%
FOX 2 Detroit/Mitchell Research	September 27, 2015	Hillary Clinton	42%	Jeb Bush	37%	5	1,483	± 2.5%
FOX 2 Detroit/Mitchell Research	August 10, 2015	Hillary Clinton	39%	Donald Trump	40%	1%	1,310	± 2.7%
FOX 2 Detroit/Mitchell Research	August 10, 2015	Hillary Clinton	40%	Jeb Bush	41%	1%	1,310	± 2.7%
FOX 2 Detroit/Mitchell Research	August 10, 2015	Hillary Clinton	36%	Marco Rubio	45%	9%	1,310	± 2.7%
Public Policy Polling	June 25–28, 2015	Hillary Clinton	47%	Jeb Bush	38%	9	1,072	± 3.0%
Public Policy Polling	June 25–28, 2015	Hillary Clinton	49%	Ben Carson	41%	8	1,072	± 3.0%
Public Policy Polling	June 25–28, 2015	Hillary Clinton	44%	Chris Christie	38%	6	1,072	± 3.0%
Public Policy Polling	June 25–28, 2015	Hillary Clinton	49%	Ted Cruz	39%	10	1,072	± 3.0%
Public Policy Polling	June 25–28, 2015	Hillary Clinton	46%	Carly Fiorina	38%	8	1,072	± 3.0%
Public Policy Polling	June 25–28, 2015	Hillary Clinton	47%	Mike Huckabee	42%	5	1,072	± 3.0%
Public Policy Polling	June 25–28, 2015	Hillary Clinton	45%	Rand Paul	42%	3	1,072	± 3.0%
Public Policy Polling	June 25–28, 2015	Hillary Clinton	46%	Marco Rubio	40%	6	1,072	± 3.0%
Public Policy Polling	June 25–28, 2015	Hillary Clinton	49%	Donald Trump	39%	10	1,072	± 3.0%
Public Policy Polling	June 25–28, 2015	Hillary Clinton	46%	Scott Walker	42%	4	1,072	± 3.0%
Public Policy Polling	June 25–28, 2015	Lincoln Chafee	31%	Scott Walker	36%	5	1,072	± 3.0%
Public Policy Polling	June 25–28, 2015	Martin O'Malley	32%	Scott Walker	37%	5	1,072	± 3.0%
Public Policy Polling	June 25–28, 2015	Bernie Sanders	35%	Scott Walker	39%	4	1,072	± 3.0%
Public Policy Polling	June 25–28, 2015	Jim Webb	31%	Scott Walker	38%	7	1,072	± 3.0%
Public Policy Polling	September 4–7, 2014	Hillary Clinton	49%	Jeb Bush	38%	11	687	± 3.7%
Public Policy Polling	September 4–7, 2014	Hillary Clinton	48%	Chris Christie	36%	12	687	± 3.7%
Public Policy Polling	September 4–7, 2014	Hillary Clinton	51%	Ted Cruz	37%	14	687	± 3.7%
Public Policy Polling	September 4–7, 2014	Hillary Clinton	50%	Mike Huckabee	38%	12	687	± 3.7%
Public Policy Polling	September 4–7, 2014	Hillary Clinton	49%	Rand Paul	39%	10	687	± 3.7%
Public Policy Polling	June 26–29, 2014	Hillary Clinton	47%	Jeb Bush	37%	10	578	± 4.1%
Public Policy Polling	June 26–29, 2014	Hillary Clinton	48%	Chris Christie	35%	13	578	± 4.1%
Public Policy Polling	June 26–29, 2014	Hillary Clinton	50%	Ted Cruz	34%	16	578	± 4.1%
Public Policy Polling	June 26–29, 2014	Hillary Clinton	48%	Mike Huckabee	36%	12	578	± 4.1%
Public Policy Polling	June 26–29, 2014	Hillary Clinton	47%	Rand Paul	37%	10	578	± 4.1%
Public Policy Polling	April 3–6, 2014	Hillary Clinton	49%	Jeb Bush	38%	11	825	± 3.4%
Public Policy Polling	April 3–6, 2014	Hillary Clinton	46%	Chris Christie	37%	9	825	± 3.4%
Public Policy Polling	April 3–6, 2014	Hillary Clinton	50%	Mike Huckabee	38%	12	825	± 3.4%
Public Policy Polling	April 3–6, 2014	Hillary Clinton	48%	Rand Paul	39%	9	825	± 3.4%
Marketing Resource Group	March 24–28, 2014	Hillary Clinton	44%	Chris Christie	38%	6	600	± 4.1%
EPIC-MRA	February 5–11, 2014	Hillary Clinton	43%	Chris Christie	39%	4	600	± 4%
Harper Polling	January 7–8, 2014	Hillary Clinton	40%	Chris Christie	38%	2	1,004	± 3%
Harper Polling	January 7–8, 2014	Hillary Clinton	46%	Ted Cruz	36%	10	1,004	± 3%
Harper Polling	January 7–8, 2014	Hillary Clinton	45%	Rand Paul	40%	5	1,004	± 3%
Harper Polling	January 7–8, 2014	Hillary Clinton	44%	Paul Ryan	41%	3	1,004	± 3%
Public Policy Polling	December 5–8, 2013	Hillary Clinton	46%	Jeb Bush	42%	4	1,034	± 3%
Public Policy Polling	December 5–8, 2013	Hillary Clinton	43%	Chris Christie	40%	3	1,034	± 3%
Public Policy Polling	December 5–8, 2013	Hillary Clinton	49%	Ted Cruz	38%	11	1,034	± 3%
Public Policy Polling	December 5–8, 2013	Hillary Clinton	48%	Rand Paul	39%	9	1,034	± 3%
Public Policy Polling	May 30 – June 2, 2013	Hillary Clinton	51%	Jeb Bush	37%	14	697	± 3.7%
Public Policy Polling	May 30 – June 2, 2013	Hillary Clinton	44%	Chris Christie	38%	6	697	± 3.7%
Public Policy Polling	May 30 – June 2, 2013	Hillary Clinton	55%	Rand Paul	35%	20	697	± 3.7%
Public Policy Polling	May 30 – June 2, 2013	Hillary Clinton	53%	Marco Rubio	36%	17	697	± 3.7%
Public Policy Polling	March 2–4, 2013	Hillary Clinton	51%	Marco Rubio	37%	14	702	± 3.7%
Public Policy Polling	March 2–4, 2013	Hillary Clinton	52%	Paul Ryan	41%	11	702	± 3.7%

== Minnesota ==
10 electoral votes
(Democratic in 2008) 54%–44%
(Democratic in 2012) 53%–45%

Poll source	Date administered	Democrat	%	Republican	%	Lead margin	Sample size	Margin of error
SurveyUSA/KSTP-TV Minneapolis	October 29 – November 2, 2015	Hillary Clinton	42%	Donald Trump	45%	3	516	± 4.4%
SurveyUSA/KSTP-TV Minneapolis	October 29 – November 2, 2015	Hillary Clinton	41%	Ben Carson	50%	9	516	± 4.4%
SurveyUSA/KSTP-TV Minneapolis	October 29 – November 2, 2015	Hillary Clinton	41%	Marco Rubio	47%	6	516	± 4.4%
SurveyUSA/KSTP-TV Minneapolis	October 29 – November 2, 2015	Hillary Clinton	43%	Jeb Bush	44%	1	516	± 4.4%
SurveyUSA/KSTP-TV Minneapolis	October 29 – November 2, 2015	Hillary Clinton	46%	Ted Cruz	41%	5	516	± 4.4%
SurveyUSA/KSTP-TV Minneapolis	October 29 – November 2, 2015	Hillary Clinton	41%	Carly Fiorina	45%	4	516	± 4.4%
Public Policy Polling	July 30 – August 2, 2015	Hillary Clinton	44%	Jeb Bush	42%	2	1015	± 3.1%
Public Policy Polling	July 30 – August 2, 2015	Hillary Clinton	44%	Ben Carson	39%	5	1015	± 3.1%
Public Policy Polling	July 30 – August 2, 2015	Hillary Clinton	43%	Chris Christie	38%	5	1015	± 3.1%
Public Policy Polling	July 30 – August 2, 2015	Hillary Clinton	44%	Ted Cruz	39%	5	1015	± 3.1%
Public Policy Polling	July 30 – August 2, 2015	Hillary Clinton	44%	Carly Fiorina	33%	11	1015	± 3.1%
Public Policy Polling	July 30 – August 2, 2015	Hillary Clinton	44%	Mike Huckabee	42%	2	1015	± 3.1%
Public Policy Polling	July 30 – August 2, 2015	Hillary Clinton	43%	Rand Paul	42%	1	1015	± 3.1%
Public Policy Polling	July 30 – August 2, 2015	Hillary Clinton	42%	Marco Rubio	40%	2	1015	± 3.1%
Public Policy Polling	July 30 – August 2, 2015	Hillary Clinton	44%	Donald Trump	39%	5	1015	± 3.1%
Public Policy Polling	July 30 – August 2, 2015	Hillary Clinton	46%	Scott Walker	42%	4	1015	± 3.1%
Public Policy Polling	July 30 – August 2, 2015	Bernie Sanders	40%	Jeb Bush	41%	1	1015	± 3.1%
Public Policy Polling	July 30 – August 2, 2015	Bernie Sanders	39%	Marco Rubio	37%	2	1015	± 3.1%
Public Policy Polling	July 30 – August 2, 2015	Bernie Sanders	45%	Donald Trump	37%	8	1015	± 3.1%
Public Policy Polling	July 30 – August 2, 2015	Bernie Sanders	41%	Scott Walker	40%	1	1015	± 3.1%
Public Policy Polling	June 12–15, 2014	Hillary Clinton	52%	Michele Bachmann	35%	17	633	± 3.9%
Public Policy Polling	June 12–15, 2014	Hillary Clinton	49%	Jeb Bush	39%	10	633	± 3.9%
Public Policy Polling	June 12–15, 2014	Hillary Clinton	47%	Chris Christie	37%	10	633	± 3.9%
Public Policy Polling	June 12–15, 2014	Hillary Clinton	51%	Ted Cruz	35%	16	633	± 3.9%
Public Policy Polling	June 12–15, 2014	Hillary Clinton	50%	Mike Huckabee	40%	10	633	± 3.9%
Public Policy Polling	June 12–15, 2014	Hillary Clinton	49%	Rand Paul	38%	11	633	± 3.9%
Public Policy Polling	June 12–15, 2014	Hillary Clinton	48%	Tim Pawlenty	42%	6	633	± 3.9%
Public Policy Polling	January 18–20, 2013	Hillary Clinton	44%	Chris Christie	38%	6	1,065	± 3%
Public Policy Polling	January 18–20, 2013	Amy Klobuchar	42%	Chris Christie	39%	3	1,065	± 3%
Public Policy Polling	January 18–20, 2013	Hillary Clinton	50%	Marco Rubio	37%	13	1,065	± 3%
Public Policy Polling	January 18–20, 2013	Amy Klobuchar	48%	Marco Rubio	36%	12	1,065	± 3%

Three-way race

Poll source	Date administered	Democrat	%	Republican	%	Independent/ Third-party candidate	%	Lead margin	Sample size	Margin of error
Public Policy Polling	July 30 – August 2, 2015	Hillary Clinton	41%	Jeb Bush	26%	Donald Trump	25%	15	1015	3.1%

== Mississippi ==
6 electoral votes
(Republican in 2008) 56%–43%
(Republican in 2012) 55%–44%

Poll source	Date administered	Democrat	%	Republican	%	Lead margin	Sample size	Margin of error
Public Policy Polling	July 10–13, 2014	Hillary Clinton	42%	Jeb Bush	47%	5	691	± 3.7%
Public Policy Polling	July 10–13, 2014	Hillary Clinton	42%	Chris Christie	45%	3	691	± 3.7%
Public Policy Polling	July 10–13, 2014	Hillary Clinton	44%	Ted Cruz	44%	Tied	691	± 3.7%
Public Policy Polling	July 10–13, 2014	Hillary Clinton	42%	Mike Huckabee	49%	7	691	± 3.7%
Public Policy Polling	July 10–13, 2014	Hillary Clinton	43%	Rand Paul	45%	2	691	± 3.7%
Public Policy Polling	November 15–17, 2013	Hillary Clinton	42%	Jeb Bush	50%	8	502	± 4.4%
Public Policy Polling	November 15–17, 2013	Hillary Clinton	40%	Chris Christie	49%	9	502	± 4.4%
Public Policy Polling	November 15–17, 2013	Hillary Clinton	45%	Ted Cruz	47%	2	502	± 4.4%
Public Policy Polling	November 15–17, 2013	Hillary Clinton	44%	Rand Paul	46%	2	502	± 4.4%

== Missouri ==
10 electoral votes
(Republican in 2008) 49.4%–49.2%
(Republican in 2012) 53%–44%

Poll source	Date administered	Democrat	%	Republican	%	Lead margin	Sample size	Margin of error
Public Policy Polling	August 7–9, 2015	Hillary Clinton	40%	Jeb Bush	47%	7	859	3.3
Public Policy Polling	August 7–9, 2015	Hillary Clinton	38%	Ben Carson	52%	14	859	3.3
Public Policy Polling	August 7–9, 2015	Hillary Clinton	37%	Chris Christie	46%	9	859	3.3
Public Policy Polling	August 7–9, 2015	Hillary Clinton	38%	Ted Cruz	50%	12	859	3.3
Public Policy Polling	August 7–9, 2015	Hillary Clinton	37%	Carly Fiorina	47%	10	859	3.3
Public Policy Polling	August 7–9, 2015	Hillary Clinton	38%	Mike Huckabee	51%	13	859	3.3
Public Policy Polling	August 7–9, 2015	Hillary Clinton	36%	John Kasich	49%	13	859	3.3
Public Policy Polling	August 7–9, 2015	Hillary Clinton	37%	Rand Paul	49%	12	859	3.3
Public Policy Polling	August 7–9, 2015	Hillary Clinton	36%	Marco Rubio	51%	15	859	3.3
Public Policy Polling	August 7–9, 2015	Hillary Clinton	39%	Donald Trump	48%	9	859	3.3
Public Policy Polling	August 7–9, 2015	Hillary Clinton	37%	Scott Walker	50%	13	859	3.3
Public Policy Polling	August 7–9, 2015	Bernie Sanders	34%	Jeb Bush	47%	13	859	3.3
Public Policy Polling	August 7–9, 2015	Bernie Sanders	33%	Marco Rubio	48%	15	859	3.3
Public Policy Polling	August 7–9, 2015	Bernie Sanders	39%	Donald Trump	48%	9	859	3.3

Three-way race

Poll source	Date administered	Democrat	%	Republican	%	Independent/ Third-party candidate	%	Lead margin	Sample size	Margin of error
Public Policy Polling	August 7–9, 2015	Hillary Clinton	34%	Jeb Bush	29%	Donald Trump	30%	4	859	3.3

== Montana ==
3 electoral votes
(Republican in 2008) 49%–47%
(Republican in 2012) 55%–42%

Poll source	Date administered	Democrat	%	Republican	%	Lead margin	Sample size	Margin of error
Montana State University Billings	November 16–23, 2015	Hillary Clinton	30%	Donald Trump	51.4%	21.4	435	± 4.8%
Montana State University Billings	November 16–23, 2015	Hillary Clinton	28.8%	Ben Carson	60.5%	31.7	435	± 4.8%
Montana State University Billings	November 16–23, 2015	Hillary Clinton	28.8%	Marco Rubio	57.2%	28.4	435	± 4.8%
Montana State University Billings	November 16–23, 2015	Hillary Clinton	30.6%	Ted Cruz	55.9%	25.3	435	± 4.8%
Montana State University Billings	November 16–23, 2015	Bernie Sanders	40.1%	Donald Trump	46.2%	6.1	435	± 4.8%
Montana State University Billings	November 16–23, 2015	Bernie Sanders	30.8%	Ben Carson	53.7%	22.9	435	± 4.8%
Montana State University Billings	November 16–23, 2015	Bernie Sanders	33.3%	Marco Rubio	47.9%	14.6	435	± 4.8%
Montana State University Billings	November 16–23, 2015	Bernie Sanders	35.8%	Ted Cruz	46%	10.2	435	± 4.8%
Gravis Marketing	February 24–25, 2015	Hillary Clinton	35.4%	Jeb Bush	48.5%	13.1	1,035	± 3%
Gravis Marketing	February 24–25, 2015	Hillary Clinton	33.3%	Chris Christie	49.5%	16.2	1,035	± 3%
Gravis Marketing	February 24–25, 2015	Hillary Clinton	33%	Mike Huckabee	50%	17	1,035	± 3%
Gravis Marketing	February 24–25, 2015	Hillary Clinton	38%	Rand Paul	48%	10	1,035	± 3%
Gravis Marketing	February 24–25, 2015	Hillary Clinton	37%	Scott Walker	49%	12	1,035	± 3%
Gravis Marketing	November 24–25, 2014	Hillary Clinton	38%	Jeb Bush	50%	12	836	± 3%
Gravis Marketing	November 24–25, 2014	Hillary Clinton	39%	Ted Cruz	52%	13	836	± 3%
Gravis Marketing	November 24–25, 2014	Hillary Clinton	37%	Nikki Haley	45%	8	836	± 3%
Gravis Marketing	November 24–25, 2014	Hillary Clinton	37%	Rand Paul	55%	18	836	± 3%
Gravis Marketing	November 24–25, 2014	Hillary Clinton	38%	Paul Ryan	54%	16	836	± 3%
Gravis Marketing	October 23–24, 2014	Hillary Clinton	38%	Jeb Bush	43%	5	604	± 4%
Gravis Marketing	October 23–24, 2014	Hillary Clinton	39%	Rand Paul	48%	9	604	± 4%
Gravis Marketing	October 23–24, 2014	Hillary Clinton	39%	Paul Ryan	46%	7	604	± 4%
Gravis Marketing	September 29–30, 2014	Hillary Clinton	36%	Jeb Bush	45%	9	535	± 4%
Gravis Marketing	September 29–30, 2014	Hillary Clinton	38%	Rand Paul	46%	8	535	± 4%
Gravis Marketing	September 29–30, 2014	Hillary Clinton	37%	Paul Ryan	51%	14	535	± 4%
Gravis Marketing	July 20–22, 2014	Hillary Clinton	39%	Jeb Bush	49%	10	741	± 4%
Public Policy Polling	November 15–17, 2013	Hillary Clinton	38%	Jeb Bush	49%	11	952	± 3.2%
Public Policy Polling	November 15–17, 2013	Hillary Clinton	34%	Chris Christie	51%	17	952	± 3.2%
Public Policy Polling	November 15–17, 2013	Hillary Clinton	39%	Ted Cruz	50%	11	952	± 3.2%
Public Policy Polling	November 15–17, 2013	Hillary Clinton	39%	Rand Paul	52%	13	952	± 3.2%
Public Policy Polling	November 15–17, 2013	Brian Schweitzer	41%	Jeb Bush	46%	5	952	± 3.2%
Public Policy Polling	November 15–17, 2013	Brian Schweitzer	39%	Chris Christie	47%	8	952	± 3.2%
Public Policy Polling	November 15–17, 2013	Brian Schweitzer	43%	Ted Cruz	46%	3	952	± 3.2%
Public Policy Polling	November 15–17, 2013	Brian Schweitzer	42%	Rand Paul	50%	8	952	± 3.2%
Public Policy Polling	June 21–23, 2013	Hillary Clinton	45%	Jeb Bush	45%	Tied	807	± 3.4%
Public Policy Polling	June 21–23, 2013	Hillary Clinton	40%	Chris Christie	45%	5	807	± 3.4%
Public Policy Polling	June 21–23, 2013	Brian Schweitzer	48%	Jeb Bush	41%	7	807	± 3.4%
Public Policy Polling	June 21–23, 2013	Brian Schweitzer	42%	Chris Christie	41%	1	807	± 3.4%
Public Policy Polling	February 15–17, 2013	Hillary Clinton	42%	Marco Rubio	50%	8	1,011	± 3.1%
Public Policy Polling	February 15–17, 2013	Hillary Clinton	44%	Paul Ryan	51%	7	1,011	± 3.1%
Public Policy Polling	February 15–17, 2013	Brian Schweitzer	46%	Marco Rubio	46%	Tied	1,011	± 3.1%
Public Policy Polling	February 15–17, 2013	Brian Schweitzer	45%	Paul Ryan	49%	4	1,011	± 3.1%

== Nevada ==
6 electoral votes
(Democratic in 2008) 55%–43%
(Democratic in 2012) 52%–46%

Poll source	Date administered	Democrat	%	Republican	%	Lead margin	Sample size	Margin of error
Morning Consult	November 10–16, 2015	Hillary Clinton	41%	Donald Trump	44%	3	628 RV	± 4%
Morning Consult	November 10–16, 2015	Hillary Clinton	44%	Jeb Bush	38%	6	628 RV	± 4%
Morning Consult	November 10–16, 2015	Hillary Clinton	44%	Ben Carson	41%	3	628 RV	± 4%
Morning Consult	November 10–16, 2015	Hillary Clinton	42%	Marco Rubio	42%	Tie	628 RV	± 4%
Public Policy Polling	July 13–14, 2015	Hillary Clinton	48%	Marco Rubio	43%	5	677	± 3.8%
Public Policy Polling	July 13–14, 2015	Hillary Clinton	48%	Donald Trump	42%	6	677	± 3.8%
Public Policy Polling	July 13–14, 2015	Hillary Clinton	48%	Scott Walker	41%	7	677	± 3.8%
Public Policy Polling	July 13–14, 2015	Hillary Clinton	49%	Jeb Bush	37%	12	677	± 3.8%
Gravis Marketing	March 27, 2015	Hillary Clinton	48%	Jeb Bush	38%	10	850	± 3%
Gravis Marketing	March 27, 2015	Hillary Clinton	48%	Chris Christie	38%	10	850	± 3%
Gravis Marketing	March 27, 2015	Hillary Clinton	50%	Rand Paul	42%	8	850	± 3%
Gravis Marketing	March 27, 2015	Hillary Clinton	49%	Scott Walker	41%	8	850	± 3%
Gravis Marketing	February 21–22, 2015	Hillary Clinton	50%	Jeb Bush	37%	13	955	± 3%
Gravis Marketing	February 21–22, 2015	Hillary Clinton	47%	Chris Christie	38%	9	955	± 3%
Gravis Marketing	February 21–22, 2015	Hillary Clinton	49%	Rand Paul	42%	7	955	± 3%
Gravis Marketing	February 21–22, 2015	Hillary Clinton	43%	Brian Sandoval	46%	3	955	± 3%
Gravis Marketing	February 21–22, 2015	Hillary Clinton	49%	Scott Walker	43%	6	955	± 3%
Harper Polling	July 26–29, 2014	Hillary Clinton	46%	Jeb Bush	41%	5	602	± 3.99%
Harper Polling	July 26–29, 2014	Hillary Clinton	48%	Susana Martínez	35%	13	602	± 3.99%
Harper Polling	July 26–29, 2014	Hillary Clinton	47%	Rand Paul	44%	3	602	± 3.99%

== New Hampshire ==
4 electoral votes
(Democratic in 2008) 54%–45%
(Democratic in 2012) 52%–46%

Poll source	Date administered	Democrat	%	Republican	%	Lead margin	Sample size	Margin of error
Public Policy Polling	November 30 – December 2, 2015	Hillary Clinton	43%	Jeb Bush	41%	2	990	± 3.1%
Public Policy Polling	November 30 – December 2, 2015	Hillary Clinton	45%	Ben Carson	43%	2	990	± 3.1%
Public Policy Polling	November 30 – December 2, 2015	Hillary Clinton	47%	Ted Cruz	39%	8	990	± 3.1%
Public Policy Polling	November 30 – December 2, 2015	Hillary Clinton	45%	Carly Fiorina	44%	1	990	± 3.1%
Public Policy Polling	November 30 – December 2, 2015	Hillary Clinton	44%	Marco Rubio	43%	1	990	± 3.1%
Public Policy Polling	November 30 – December 2, 2015	Hillary Clinton	47%	Donald Trump	41%	6	990	± 3.1%
Public Policy Polling	November 30 – December 2, 2015	Bernie Sanders	47%	Jeb Bush	38%	9	990	± 3.1%
Public Policy Polling	November 30 – December 2, 2015	Bernie Sanders	46%	Ben Carson	41%	5	990	± 3.1%
Public Policy Polling	November 30 – December 2, 2015	Bernie Sanders	48%	Ted Cruz	38%	10	990	± 3.1%
Public Policy Polling	November 30 – December 2, 2015	Bernie Sanders	48%	Carly Fiorina	40%	8	990	± 3.1%
Public Policy Polling	November 30 – December 2, 2015	Bernie Sanders	45%	Marco Rubio	41%	4	990	± 3.1%
Public Policy Polling	November 30 – December 2, 2015	Bernie Sanders	49%	Donald Trump	40%	9	990	± 3.1%
Fox News	November 15–17, 2015	Hillary Clinton	47%	Donald Trump	40%	7	804	± 3.5%
Fox News	November 15–17, 2015	Hillary Clinton	44%	Ted Cruz	41%	3	804	± 3.5%
Fox News	November 15–17, 2015	Hillary Clinton	44%	Chris Christie	43%	1	804	± 3.5%
Fox News	November 15–17, 2015	Hillary Clinton	43%	Carly Fiorina	43%	Tied	804	± 3.5%
Fox News	November 15–17, 2015	Hillary Clinton	43%	Ben Carson	45%	2	804	± 3.5%
Fox News	November 15–17, 2015	Hillary Clinton	42%	Jeb Bush	45%	3	804	± 3.5%
Fox News	November 15–17, 2015	Hillary Clinton	40%	John Kasich	43%	3	804	± 3.5%
Fox News	November 15–17, 2015	Hillary Clinton	40%	Marco Rubio	47%	7	804	± 3.5%
Public Policy Polling	October 16–18, 2015	Hillary Clinton	45%	Jeb Bush	41%	4	880	± 3.3%
Public Policy Polling	October 16–18, 2015	Hillary Clinton	48%	Ben Carson	42%	6	880	± 3.3%
Public Policy Polling	October 16–18, 2015	Hillary Clinton	45%	Chris Christie	44%	1	880	± 3.3%
Public Policy Polling	October 16–18, 2015	Hillary Clinton	50%	Ted Cruz	38%	13	880	± 3.3%
Public Policy Polling	October 16–18, 2015	Hillary Clinton	46%	Carly Fiorina	42%	4	880	± 3.3%
Public Policy Polling	October 16–18, 2015	Hillary Clinton	51%	Mike Huckabee	35%	16	880	± 3.3%
Public Policy Polling	October 16–18, 2015	Hillary Clinton	44%	John Kasich	44%	Tied	880	± 3.3%
Public Policy Polling	October 16–18, 2015	Hillary Clinton	48%	Marco Rubio	42%	6	880	± 3.3%
Public Policy Polling	October 16–18, 2015	Hillary Clinton	47%	Donald Trump	41%	6	880	± 3.3%
Public Policy Polling	October 16–18, 2015	Joe Biden	48%	Ben Carson	39%	9	880	± 3.3%
Public Policy Polling	October 16–18, 2015	Joe Biden	47%	Marco Rubio	40%	7	880	± 3.3%
Public Policy Polling	October 16–18, 2015	Joe Biden	51%	Donald Trump	40%	11	880	± 3.3%
Public Policy Polling	October 16–18, 2015	Bernie Sanders	47%	Ben Carson	39%	8	880	± 3.3%
Public Policy Polling	October 16–18, 2015	Bernie Sanders	45%	Marco Rubio	41%	4	880	± 3.3%
Public Policy Polling	October 16–18, 2015	Bernie Sanders	49%	Donald Trump	40%	9	880	± 3.3%
NBC News/Wall Street Journal	September 23–30, 2015	Hillary Clinton	42%	Jeb Bush	49%	7	1,044	± 3.0%
NBC News/Wall Street Journal	September 23–30, 2015	Hillary Clinton	48%	Donald Trump	45%	3	1,044	± 3.0%
NBC News/Wall Street Journal	September 23–30, 2015	Hillary Clinton	42%	Carly Fiorina	50%	8	1,044	± 3.0%
NBC News/Wall Street Journal	September 23–30, 2015	Bernie Sanders	46%	Jeb Bush	46%	Tied	1,044	± 3.0%
NBC News/Wall Street Journal	September 23–30, 2015	Bernie Sanders	52%	Donald Trump	42%	10	1,044	± 3.0%
NBC News/Wall Street Journal	September 23–30, 2015	Bernie Sanders	47%	Carly Fiorina	45%	2	1,044	± 3.0%
CNN/WMUR	September 17–23, 2015	Hillary Clinton	50%	Donald Trump	42%	8	820	± 3.6%
CNN/WMUR	September 17–23, 2015	Bernie Sanders	57%	Donald Trump	37%	20	820	± 3.6%
CNN/WMUR	September 17–23, 2015	Joe Biden	56%	Donald Trump	37%	19	820	± 3.6%
NBC News/Marist	August 26 – September 2, 2015	Hillary Clinton	43%	Jeb Bush	48%	5	966	± 3.2%
NBC News/Marist	August 26 – September 2, 2015	Hillary Clinton	46%	Donald Trump	45%	1	966	± 3.2%
NBC News/Marist	August 26 – September 2, 2015	Joe Biden	45%	Jeb Bush	46%	1	966	± 3.2%
NBC News/Marist	August 26 – September 2, 2015	Joe Biden	50%	Donald Trump	41%	9	966	± 3.2%
Public Policy Polling	August 21–24, 2015	Hillary Clinton	46%	Jeb Bush	39%	7	841	± 3.4%
Public Policy Polling	August 21–24, 2015	Bernie Sanders	46%	Jeb Bush	38%	8	841	± 3.4%
Public Policy Polling	August 21–24, 2015	Hillary Clinton	48%	Ben Carson	40%	8	841	± 3.4%
Public Policy Polling	August 21–24, 2015	Hillary Clinton	46%	Chris Christie	38%	8	841	± 3.4%
Public Policy Polling	August 21–24, 2015	Hillary Clinton	49%	Ted Cruz	38%	11	841	± 3.4%
Public Policy Polling	August 21–24, 2015	Hillary Clinton	45%	Carly Fiorina	42%	3	841	± 3.4%
Public Policy Polling	August 21–24, 2015	Hillary Clinton	49%	Mike Huckabee	36%	13	841	± 3.4%
Public Policy Polling	August 21–24, 2015	Hillary Clinton	41%	John Kasich	43%	2	841	± 3.4%
Public Policy Polling	August 21–24, 2015	Hillary Clinton	47%	Rand Paul	37%	10	841	± 3.4%
Public Policy Polling	August 21–24, 2015	Hillary Clinton	47%	Marco Rubio	39%	8	841	± 3.4%
Public Policy Polling	August 21–24, 2015	Bernie Sanders	48%	Marco Rubio	35%	13	841	± 3.4%
Public Policy Polling	August 21–24, 2015	Hillary Clinton	46%	Donald Trump	44%	2	841	± 3.4%
Public Policy Polling	August 21–24, 2015	Bernie Sanders	50%	Donald Trump	41%	9	841	± 3.4%
Public Policy Polling	August 21–24, 2015	Hillary Clinton	47%	Scott Walker	39%	8	841	± 3.4%
Public Policy Polling	August 21–24, 2015	Bernie Sanders	47%	Scott Walker	39%	8	841	± 3.4%
University of New Hampshire/WMUR	July 22–30, 2015	Hillary Clinton	45%	Jeb Bush	46%	1	722	± 3.8%
University of New Hampshire/WMUR	July 22–30, 2015	Hillary Clinton	43%	Rand Paul	45%	2	722	± 3.8%
University of New Hampshire/WMUR	July 22–30, 2015	Hillary Clinton	43%	Scott Walker	45%	2	722	± 3.8%
University of New Hampshire/WMUR	July 22–30, 2015	Hillary Clinton	44%	Marco Rubio	43%	1	722	± 3.8%
University of New Hampshire/WMUR	July 22–30, 2015	Hillary Clinton	50%	Donald Trump	40%	10	722	± 3.8%
Purple Insights	May 2–6, 2015	Hillary Clinton	44%	Jeb Bush	42%	2	952	± 4.4%
Purple Insights	May 2–6, 2015	Hillary Clinton	46%	Rand Paul	43%	3	952	± 4.4%
Purple Insights	May 2–6, 2015	Hillary Clinton	44%	Marco Rubio	42%	2	952	± 4.4%
Purple Insights	May 2–6, 2015	Hillary Clinton	46%	Scott Walker	40%	6	952	± 4.4%
University of New Hampshire/WMUR	April 24 – May 1, 2015	Hillary Clinton	41%	Jeb Bush	47%	6	627	± 3.9%
University of New Hampshire/WMUR	April 24 – May 1, 2015	Hillary Clinton	46%	Ted Cruz	45%	1	627	± 3.9%
University of New Hampshire/WMUR	April 24 – May 1, 2015	Hillary Clinton	43%	Rand Paul	47%	4	627	± 3.9%
University of New Hampshire/WMUR	April 24 – May 1, 2015	Hillary Clinton	42%	Marco Rubio	47%	5	627	± 3.9%
University of New Hampshire/WMUR	April 24 – May 1, 2015	Hillary Clinton	44%	Scott Walker	44%	Tied	627	± 3.9%
Dartmouth College	April 27–30, 2015	Hillary Clinton	34.1%	Jeb Bush	36.9%	2.8	355	± 5.2%
Dartmouth College	April 27–30, 2015	Hillary Clinton	36.5%	Chris Christie	34.4%	2.1	355	± 5.2%
Dartmouth College	April 27–30, 2015	Hillary Clinton	36.9%	Ted Cruz	28.7%	8.2	355	± 5.2%
Dartmouth College	April 27–30, 2015	Hillary Clinton	38.1%	Mike Huckabee	31.1%	7	355	± 5.2%
Dartmouth College	April 27–30, 2015	Hillary Clinton	36.1%	Rand Paul	33.3%	2.8	355	± 5.2%
Dartmouth College	April 27–30, 2015	Hillary Clinton	34.5%	Marco Rubio	34.4%	0.1	355	± 5.2%
Dartmouth College	April 27–30, 2015	Hillary Clinton	34.8%	Scott Walker	38.7%	3.9	355	± 5.2%
Gravis Marketing	April 21–22, 2015	Hillary Clinton	42%	Jeb Bush	42%	Tied	1,117	± 3%
Gravis Marketing	April 21–22, 2015	Hillary Clinton	43%	Chris Christie	41%	2	1,117	± 3%
Gravis Marketing	April 21–22, 2015	Hillary Clinton	47%	Ted Cruz	44%	3	1,117	± 3%
Gravis Marketing	April 21–22, 2015	Hillary Clinton	44%	Rand Paul	45%	1	1,117	± 3%
Gravis Marketing	April 21–22, 2015	Hillary Clinton	45%	Marco Rubio	44%	1	1,117	± 3%
Gravis Marketing	April 21–22, 2015	Hillary Clinton	44%	Scott Walker	47%	3	1,117	± 3%
Public Policy Polling	April 9–13, 2015	Hillary Clinton	49%	Jeb Bush	36%	13	747	± 3.6%
Public Policy Polling	April 9–13, 2015	Hillary Clinton	51%	Ben Carson	38%	13	747	± 3.6%
Public Policy Polling	April 9–13, 2015	Hillary Clinton	51%	Chris Christie	36%	15	747	± 3.6%
Public Policy Polling	April 9–13, 2015	Hillary Clinton	52%	Ted Cruz	37%	15	747	± 3.6%
Public Policy Polling	April 9–13, 2015	Hillary Clinton	51%	Mike Huckabee	38%	13	747	± 3.6%
Public Policy Polling	April 9–13, 2015	Hillary Clinton	49%	Rand Paul	40%	9	747	± 3.6%
Public Policy Polling	April 9–13, 2015	Hillary Clinton	51%	Rick Perry	38%	13	747	± 3.6%
Public Policy Polling	April 9–13, 2015	Hillary Clinton	50%	Marco Rubio	38%	12	747	± 3.6%
Public Policy Polling	April 9–13, 2015	Hillary Clinton	49%	Scott Walker	40%	9	747	± 3.6%
Public Policy Polling	April 9–13, 2015	Joe Biden	44%	Scott Walker	40%	4	747	± 3.6%
Public Policy Polling	April 9–13, 2015	Elizabeth Warren	45%	Scott Walker	40%	5	747	± 3.6%
Gravis Marketing	March 18–19, 2015	Hillary Clinton	43%	Jeb Bush	40%	3	?	± ?
Gravis Marketing	March 18–19, 2015	Hillary Clinton	45%	Rand Paul	42%	3	?	± ?
Gravis Marketing	March 18–19, 2015	Hillary Clinton	46%	Scott Walker	43%	3	?	± ?
NBC News/Marist	February 3–10, 2015	Hillary Clinton	48%	Jeb Bush	42%	6	887	± 3.3%
NBC News/Marist	February 3–10, 2015	Hillary Clinton	49%	Scott Walker	42%	7	887	± 3.3%
Purple Insights	January 31 – February 5, 2015	Hillary Clinton	50%	Jeb Bush	36%	14	503	± 4.4%
Purple Insights	January 31 – February 5, 2015	Hillary Clinton	48%	Rand Paul	41%	7	503	± 4.4%
Purple Insights	January 31 – February 5, 2015	Hillary Clinton	50%	Scott Walker	37%	13	503	± 4.4%
University of New Hampshire/WMUR	January 22 – February 3, 2015	Hillary Clinton	51%	Jeb Bush	39%	12	776	± 3.5%
University of New Hampshire/WMUR	January 22 – February 3, 2015	Hillary Clinton	50%	Rand Paul	40%	10	776	± 3.5%
Purple Insights	November 12–18, 2014	Hillary Clinton	47%	Jeb Bush	39%	8	500	± 4.4%
Purple Insights	November 12–18, 2014	Hillary Clinton	48%	Rand Paul	41%	7	500	± 4.4%
Purple Insights	November 12–18, 2014	Hillary Clinton	46%	Mitt Romney	45%	1	500	± 4.4%
NBC News/Marist	July 7–13, 2014	Hillary Clinton	47%	Jeb Bush	42%	5	1,342	± 2.7%
NBC News/Marist	July 7–13, 2014	Hillary Clinton	47%	Chris Christie	42%	5	1,342	± 2.7%
NBC News/Marist	July 7–13, 2014	Hillary Clinton	51%	Ted Cruz	38%	13	1,342	± 2.7%
NBC News/Marist	July 7–13, 2014	Hillary Clinton	46%	Rand Paul	43%	3	1,342	± 2.7%
NBC News/Marist	July 7–13, 2014	Hillary Clinton	47%	Marco Rubio	42%	5	1,342	± 2.7%
NBC News/Marist	July 7–13, 2014	Hillary Clinton	48%	Scott Walker	39%	9	1,342	± 2.7%
Dartmouth College	April 21–25, 2014	Hillary Clinton	42.1%	Jeb Bush	32.2%	9.9	412	± 4.8%
Dartmouth College	April 21–25, 2014	Hillary Clinton	36.5%	Chris Christie	34.4%	2.1	412	± 4.8%
Dartmouth College	April 21–25, 2014	Hillary Clinton	38.3%	Mike Huckabee	36.2%	2.1	412	± 4.8%
Dartmouth College	April 21–25, 2014	Hillary Clinton	35.8%	Rand Paul	38.4%	2.6	412	± 4.8%
Purple Strategies	January 21–23, 2014	Hillary Clinton	46%	Jeb Bush	42%	4	1,052	± 3%
Purple Strategies	January 21–23, 2014	Hillary Clinton	46%	Chris Christie	44%	2	1,052	± 3%
Purple Strategies	January 21–23, 2014	Elizabeth Warren	35%	Jeb Bush	46%	11	1,052	± 3%
Purple Strategies	January 21–23, 2014	Elizabeth Warren	33%	Chris Christie	45%	12	1,052	± 3%
Public Policy Polling	January 9–12, 2014	Hillary Clinton	49%	Jeb Bush	38%	11	1,354	± 2.7%
Public Policy Polling	January 9–12, 2014	Hillary Clinton	43%	Chris Christie	39%	4	1,354	± 2.7%
Public Policy Polling	January 9–12, 2014	Hillary Clinton	51%	Ted Cruz	32%	19	1,354	± 2.7%
Public Policy Polling	January 9–12, 2014	Hillary Clinton	50%	Rand Paul	37%	13	1,354	± 2.7%
Public Policy Polling	September 13–16, 2013	Hillary Clinton	50%	Kelly Ayotte	42%	8	1,038	± 3%
Public Policy Polling	September 13–16, 2013	Hillary Clinton	49%	Jeb Bush	40%	9	1,038	± 3%
Public Policy Polling	September 13–16, 2013	Hillary Clinton	43%	Chris Christie	39%	4	1,038	± 3%
Public Policy Polling	September 13–16, 2013	Hillary Clinton	50%	Ted Cruz	38%	12	1,038	± 3%
Public Policy Polling	September 13–16, 2013	Hillary Clinton	51%	Rand Paul	41%	10	1,038	± 3%
Public Policy Polling	September 13–16, 2013	Hillary Clinton	50%	Paul Ryan	41%	9	1,038	± 3%
Dartmouth College	April 22–25, 2013	Hillary Clinton	37.1%	Chris Christie	32.3%	4.8	433	± 4.7%
Dartmouth College	April 22–25, 2013	Hillary Clinton	44.3%	Marco Rubio	33.2%	11.1	433	± 4.7%
Public Policy Polling	April 19–21, 2013	Hillary Clinton	52%	Rand Paul	41%	11	933	± 3.2%
Public Policy Polling	April 19–21, 2013	Hillary Clinton	52%	Marco Rubio	38%	14	933	± 3.2%

Three-way race

Poll source	Date administered	Democrat	%	Republican	%	Independent/ Third-party candidate	%	Lead margin	Sample size	Margin of error
Public Policy Polling	August 21–24, 2015	Hillary Clinton	43%	Jeb Bush	22%	Donald Trump	28%	15	957	3.2%

== New Jersey ==
14 electoral votes
(Democratic in 2008) 57%–42%
(Democratic in 2012) 58%–41%

Poll source	Date administered	Democrat	%	Republican	%	Lead margin	Sample size	Margin of error
Quinnipiac University	April 9–14, 2015	Hillary Clinton	53%	Jeb Bush	33%	20	1,428	± 2.6%
Quinnipiac University	April 9–14, 2015	Hillary Clinton	51%	Chris Christie	36%	15	1,428	± 2.6%
Quinnipiac University	April 9–14, 2015	Hillary Clinton	58%	Ted Cruz	30%	28	1,428	± 2.6%
Quinnipiac University	April 9–14, 2015	Hillary Clinton	56%	Mike Huckabee	30%	26	1,428	± 2.6%
Quinnipiac University	April 9–14, 2015	Hillary Clinton	54%	Rand Paul	34%	20	1,428	± 2.6%
Quinnipiac University	April 9–14, 2015	Hillary Clinton	54%	Marco Rubio	34%	20	1,428	± 2.6%
Quinnipiac University	April 9–14, 2015	Hillary Clinton	54%	Scott Walker	32%	22	1,428	± 2.6%
Rutgers-Eagleton	February 3–10, 2015	Hillary Clinton	58%	Jeb Bush	32%	26	694	± 4.2%
Rutgers-Eagleton	February 3–10, 2015	Hillary Clinton	58%	Chris Christie	35%	23	694	± 4.2%
Rutgers-Eagleton	February 3–10, 2015	Hillary Clinton	60%	Scott Walker	29%	31	694	± 4.2%
Quinnipiac University	January 15–19, 2015	Hillary Clinton	53%	Jeb Bush	37%	16	1,211	± 2.8%
Quinnipiac University	January 15–19, 2015	Hillary Clinton	52%	Chris Christie	39%	13	1,211	± 2.8%
Quinnipiac University	January 15–19, 2015	Hillary Clinton	56%	Mike Huckabee	33%	23	1,211	± 2.8%
Quinnipiac University	January 15–19, 2015	Hillary Clinton	54%	Rand Paul	35%	19	1,211	± 2.8%
Quinnipiac University	January 15–19, 2015	Hillary Clinton	53%	Mitt Romney	38%	15	1,211	± 2.8%
Rutgers-Eagleton	December 3–10, 2014	Hillary Clinton	49%	Chris Christie	39%	10	646	± 3.9%
Quinnipiac University	December 3–8, 2014	Hillary Clinton	53%	Jeb Bush	31%	22	1,340	± 2.7%
Quinnipiac University	December 3–8, 2014	Hillary Clinton	50%	Chris Christie	39%	11	1,340	± 2.7%
Quinnipiac University	December 3–8, 2014	Hillary Clinton	55%	Rand Paul	31%	24	1,340	± 2.7%
Quinnipiac University	December 3–8, 2014	Hillary Clinton	52%	Mitt Romney	35%	17	1,340	± 2.7%
Quinnipiac University	September 25–29, 2014	Hillary Clinton	53%	Jeb Bush	32%	21	1,475	± 2.6%
Quinnipiac University	September 25–29, 2014	Hillary Clinton	50%	Chris Christie	40%	10	1,475	± 2.6%
Quinnipiac University	September 25–29, 2014	Hillary Clinton	55%	Rand Paul	31%	24	1,475	± 2.6%
Fairleigh Dickinson University	September 1–7, 2014	Hillary Clinton	51%	Jeb Bush	32%	19	721	± 3.7%
Fairleigh Dickinson University	September 1–7, 2014	Hillary Clinton	45%	Chris Christie	42%	3	721	± 3.7%
Fairleigh Dickinson University	September 1–7, 2014	Hillary Clinton	48%	Rand Paul	33%	15	721	± 3.7%
Rutgers-Eagleton	July 28 – August 5, 2014	Hillary Clinton	51%	Chris Christie	40%	11	750	± 4%
Quinnipiac University	July 31 – August 4, 2014	Hillary Clinton	54%	Jeb Bush	34%	20	1,148	± 2.9%
Quinnipiac University	July 31 – August 4, 2014	Hillary Clinton	50%	Chris Christie	42%	8	1,148	± 2.9%
Quinnipiac University	July 31 – August 4, 2014	Hillary Clinton	57%	Mike Huckabee	34%	23	1,148	± 2.9%
Quinnipiac University	July 31 – August 4, 2014	Hillary Clinton	55%	Rand Paul	35%	20	1,148	± 2.9%
Roanoke/Rutgers-Eagleton/Siena College	February 22–28, 2014	Hillary Clinton	51%	Chris Christie	41%	10	842	± 3.6%
Roanoke/Rutgers-Eagleton/Siena College	February 22–28, 2014	Hillary Clinton	58%	Rand Paul	29%	29	842	± 3.6%
Roanoke/Rutgers-Eagleton/Siena College	February 22–28, 2014	Hillary Clinton	58%	Paul Ryan	33%	25	842	± 3.6%
Rutgers-Eagleton	January 22, 2014	Hillary Clinton	55%	Chris Christie	34%	21	?	± ?
Monmouth University	December 4–8, 2013	Hillary Clinton	43%	Chris Christie	46%	3	698/802	± 3.5%
Monmouth University	December 4–8, 2013	Andrew Cuomo	33%	Chris Christie	52%	19	698/802	± 3.5%
Quinnipiac University	September 23–29, 2013	Hillary Clinton	49%	Chris Christie	36%	13	1,497	± 2.5%
Quinnipiac University	September 23–29, 2013	Hillary Clinton	53%	Rand Paul	36%	17	1,497	± 2.5%
Quinnipiac University	September 23–29, 2013	Hillary Clinton	54%	Ted Cruz	31%	23	1,497	± 2.5%
Pulse Opinion Research	September 19, 2013	Hillary Clinton	48%	Chris Christie	43%	5	1,000	± ?
NBC News/Marist	April 28 – May 2, 2013	Hillary Clinton	52%	Chris Christie	41%	11	1,095	± 3%
NBC News/Marist	April 28 – May 2, 2013	Joe Biden	40%	Chris Christie	51%	11	1,095	± 3%
Quinnipiac University	February 13–17, 2013	Hillary Clinton	49%	Chris Christie	45%	4	1,149	± 2.9%
Quinnipiac University	February 13–17, 2013	Andrew Cuomo	36%	Chris Christie	54%	18	1,149	± 2.9%
Public Policy Polling	November 26–28, 2012	Hillary Clinton	52%	Chris Christie	40%	12	600	± 4%
Public Policy Polling	November 26–28, 2012	Joe Biden	41%	Chris Christie	47%	6	600	± 4%
Public Policy Polling	November 26–28, 2012	Andrew Cuomo	35%	Chris Christie	50%	15	600	± 4%

== New Mexico ==
5 electoral votes
(Democratic in 2008) 57%–42%
(Democratic in 2012) 53%–43%

Poll source	Date administered	Democrat	%	Republican	%	Lead margin	Sample size	Margin of error
Gravis Marketing	September 27 – October 1, 2014	Hillary Clinton	50%	Jeb Bush	36%	14	727	± 4%
Gravis Marketing	September 27 – October 1, 2014	Hillary Clinton	49%	Rand Paul	36%	13	727	± 4%
Public Policy Polling	March 20–23, 2014	Hillary Clinton	53%	Jeb Bush	37%	16	674	± 3.8%
Public Policy Polling	March 20–23, 2014	Hillary Clinton	53%	Chris Christie	35%	18	674	± 3.8%
Public Policy Polling	March 20–23, 2014	Hillary Clinton	54%	Ted Cruz	37%	17	674	± 3.8%
Public Policy Polling	March 20–23, 2014	Hillary Clinton	55%	Mike Huckabee	34%	21	674	± 3.8%
Public Policy Polling	March 20–23, 2014	Hillary Clinton	53%	Susana Martinez	39%	14	674	± 3.8%
Public Policy Polling	March 20–23, 2014	Hillary Clinton	51%	Rand Paul	36%	15	674	± 3.8%

== New York ==
29 electoral votes
(Democratic in 2008) 63%–36%
(Democratic in 2012) 63%–35%

Poll source	Date administered	Democrat	%	Republican	%	Lead margin	Sample size	Margin of error
Siena College	September 14–17, 2015	Hillary Clinton	53%	Jeb Bush	36%	17	817	± 4%
Siena College	September 14–17, 2015	Hillary Clinton	52%	Ben Carson	40%	12	817	± 4%
Siena College	September 14–17, 2015	Hillary Clinton	55%	Donald Trump	36%	19	817	± 4%
Siena College	September 14–17, 2015	Joe Biden	59%	Jeb Bush	30%	29	817	± 4%
Siena College	September 14–17, 2015	Joe Biden	55%	Ben Carson	35%	20	817	± 4%
Siena College	September 14–17, 2015	Joe Biden	60%	Donald Trump	33%	27	817	± 4%
Siena College	September 14–17, 2015	Bernie Sanders	52%	Jeb Bush	33%	19	817	± 4%
Siena College	September 14–17, 2015	Bernie Sanders	46%	Ben Carson	39%	7	817	± 4%
Siena College	September 14–17, 2015	Bernie Sanders	52%	Donald Trump	38%	14	817	± 4%
Siena College	March 11–16, 2015	Hillary Clinton	55%	Jeb Bush	32%	23	785	± 4%
Siena College	March 11–16, 2015	Hillary Clinton	54%	Chris Christie	34%	20	785	± 4%
Siena College	March 11–16, 2015	Hillary Clinton	59%	Ted Cruz	26%	33	785	± 4%
Siena College	March 11–16, 2015	Hillary Clinton	58%	Rand Paul	29%	29	785	± 4%
Siena College	March 11–16, 2015	Hillary Clinton	59%	Marco Rubio	30%	29	785	± 4%
Quinnipiac University	March 11–16, 2015	Hillary Clinton	58%	Jeb Bush	30%	28	1,228	± 2.8%
Quinnipiac University	March 11–16, 2015	Hillary Clinton	54%	Chris Christie	34%	20	1,228	± 2.8%
Quinnipiac University	March 11–16, 2015	Hillary Clinton	60%	Ted Cruz	27%	33	1,228	± 2.8%
Quinnipiac University	March 11–16, 2015	Hillary Clinton	58%	Mike Huckabee	29%	29	1,228	± 2.8%
Quinnipiac University	March 11–16, 2015	Hillary Clinton	55%	George Pataki	34%	21	1,228	± 2.8%
Quinnipiac University	March 11–16, 2015	Hillary Clinton	59%	Rand Paul	31%	28	1,228	± 2.8%
Quinnipiac University	March 11–16, 2015	Hillary Clinton	58%	Marco Rubio	31%	27	1,228	± 2.8%
Quinnipiac University	March 11–16, 2015	Hillary Clinton	58%	Scott Walker	31%	27	1,228	± 2.8%
Quinnipiac University	August 14–17, 2014	Hillary Clinton	60%	Jeb Bush	29%	31	1,034	± 3.1%
Quinnipiac University	August 14–17, 2014	Hillary Clinton	54%	Chris Christie	34%	20	1,034	± 3.1%
Quinnipiac University	August 14–17, 2014	Hillary Clinton	61%	Rand Paul	30%	31	1,034	± 3.1%
Quinnipiac University	August 14–17, 2014	Andrew Cuomo	53%	Jeb Bush	30%	23	1,034	± 3.1%
Quinnipiac University	August 14–17, 2014	Andrew Cuomo	47%	Chris Christie	37%	10	1,034	± 3.1%
Quinnipiac University	August 14–17, 2014	Andrew Cuomo	55%	Rand Paul	31%	24	1,034	± 3.1%
Roanoke/Rutgers-Eagleton/Siena College	February 22–28, 2014	Hillary Clinton	64%	Chris Christie	28%	36	814	± 3.4%
Roanoke/Rutgers-Eagleton/Siena College	February 22–28, 2014	Hillary Clinton	67%	Rand Paul	24%	43	814	± 3.4%
Roanoke/Rutgers-Eagleton/Siena College	February 22–28, 2014	Hillary Clinton	64%	Paul Ryan	27%	37	814	± 3.4%
Quinnipiac University	February 6–10, 2014	Hillary Clinton	58%	Chris Christie	31%	27	1,488	± 2.5%
Quinnipiac University	February 6–10, 2014	Andrew Cuomo	50%	Chris Christie	34%	16	1,488	± 2.5%
Siena College	January 12–16, 2014	Hillary Clinton	60%	Chris Christie	32%	28	808	± 3.4%
Siena College	January 12–16, 2014	Andrew Cuomo	55%	Chris Christie	35%	20	808	± 3.4%
Marist	November 18–20, 2013	Hillary Clinton	57%	Chris Christie	39%	18	675	± 3.8%
Marist	November 18–20, 2013	Andrew Cuomo	51%	Chris Christie	44%	7	675	± 3.8%
Siena College	November 8–11, 2013	Hillary Clinton	56%	Chris Christie	40%	16	806	± 3.5%
Siena College	November 8–11, 2013	Andrew Cuomo	42%	Chris Christie	47%	5	806	± 3.5%
Quinnipiac University	March 11–17, 2013	Hillary Clinton	59%	Chris Christie	32%	27	1,165	± 2.9%
Quinnipiac University	March 11–17, 2013	Andrew Cuomo	46%	Chris Christie	38%	8	1,165	± 2.9%

== North Carolina ==
15 electoral votes
(Democratic in 2008) 50%–49%
(Republican in 2012) 50%–48%

Poll source	Date administered	Democrat	%	Republican	%	Lead margin	Sample size	Margin of error
Public Policy Polling	December 5–7, 2015	Hillary Clinton	43%	Jeb Bush	43%	Tied	1,214	2.8%
Public Policy Polling	December 5–7, 2015	Hillary Clinton	41%	Ben Carson	47%	6	1,214	2.8%
Public Policy Polling	December 5–7, 2015	Hillary Clinton	43%	Ted Cruz	47%	4	1,214	2.8%
Public Policy Polling	December 5–7, 2015	Hillary Clinton	42%	Carly Fiorina	44%	2	1,214	2.8%
Public Policy Polling	December 5–7, 2015	Hillary Clinton	42%	Marco Rubio	46%	4	1,214	2.8%
Public Policy Polling	December 5–7, 2015	Hillary Clinton	43%	Donald Trump	47%	4	1,214	2.8%
Public Policy Polling	December 5–7, 2015	Bernie Sanders	39%	Jeb Bush	42%	3	1,214	2.8%
Public Policy Polling	December 5–7, 2015	Bernie Sanders	37%	Ben Carson	46%	9	1,214	2.8%
Public Policy Polling	December 5–7, 2015	Bernie Sanders	42%	Ted Cruz	44%	2	1,214	2.8%
Public Policy Polling	December 5–7, 2015	Bernie Sanders	40%	Carly Fiorina	40%	Tied	1,214	2.8%
Public Policy Polling	December 5–7, 2015	Bernie Sanders	39%	Marco Rubio	44%	5	1,214	2.8%
Public Policy Polling	December 5–7, 2015	Bernie Sanders	44%	Donald Trump	46%	2	1,214	2.8%
Public Policy Polling	October 23–25, 2015	Hillary Clinton	46%	Jeb Bush	43%	3	893	3.3%
Public Policy Polling	October 23–25, 2015	Hillary Clinton	43%	Ben Carson	49%	6	893	3.3%
Public Policy Polling	October 23–25, 2015	Hillary Clinton	45%	Ted Cruz	46%	1	893	3.3%
Public Policy Polling	October 23–25, 2015	Hillary Clinton	43%	Carly Fiorina	45%	2	893	3.3%
Public Policy Polling	October 23–25, 2015	Hillary Clinton	44%	Mike Huckabee	48%	4	893	3.3%
Public Policy Polling	October 23–25, 2015	Hillary Clinton	46%	John Kasich	43%	2	893	3.3%
Public Policy Polling	October 23–25, 2015	Hillary Clinton	42%	Marco Rubio	48%	6	893	3.3%
Public Policy Polling	October 23–25, 2015	Hillary Clinton	42%	Donald Trump	48%	6	893	3.3%
Public Policy Polling	October 23–25, 2015	Bernie Sanders	40%	Jeb Bush	46%	6	893	3.3%
Public Policy Polling	October 23–25, 2015	Bernie Sanders	37%	Ben Carson	48%	11	893	3.3%
Public Policy Polling	October 23–25, 2015	Bernie Sanders	41%	Ted Cruz	45%	4	893	3.3%
Public Policy Polling	October 23–25, 2015	Bernie Sanders	41%	Donald Trump	48%	7	893	3.3%
Public Policy Polling	September 24–27, 2015	Hillary Clinton	41%	Jeb Bush	46%	5	1,268	2.8%
Public Policy Polling	September 24–27, 2015	Hillary Clinton	41%	Ben Carson	51%	10	1,268	2.8%
Public Policy Polling	September 24–27, 2015	Hillary Clinton	43%	Ted Cruz	46%	3	1,268	2.8%
Public Policy Polling	September 24–27, 2015	Hillary Clinton	41%	Carly Fiorina	48%	7	1,268	2.8%
Public Policy Polling	September 24–27, 2015	Hillary Clinton	41%	Mike Huckabee	48%	7	1,268	2.8%
Public Policy Polling	September 24–27, 2015	Hillary Clinton	40%	John Kasich	44%	4	1,268	2.8%
Public Policy Polling	September 24–27, 2015	Hillary Clinton	40%	Marco Rubio	50%	10	1,268	2.8%
Public Policy Polling	September 24–27, 2015	Hillary Clinton	42%	Donald Trump	47%	5	1,268	2.8%
Public Policy Polling	September 24–27, 2015	Joe Biden	47%	Jeb Bush	42%	5	1,268	2.8%
Public Policy Polling	September 24–27, 2015	Joe Biden	44%	Ben Carson	47%	3	1,268	2.8%
Public Policy Polling	September 24–27, 2015	Joe Biden	44%	Carly Fiorina	45%	1	1,268	2.8%
Public Policy Polling	September 24–27, 2015	Joe Biden	45%	Donald Trump	45%	Tied	1,268	2.8%
Public Policy Polling	September 24–27, 2015	Bernie Sanders	39%	Jeb Bush	45%	6	1,268	2.8%
Public Policy Polling	September 24–27, 2015	Bernie Sanders	35%	Ben Carson	48%	13	1,268	2.8%
Public Policy Polling	September 24–27, 2015	Bernie Sanders	37%	Carly Fiorina	46%	9	1,268	2.8%
Public Policy Polling	September 24–27, 2015	Bernie Sanders	43%	Donald Trump	46%	3	1,268	2.8%
Elon University	September 17–23, 2015	Hillary Clinton	43%	Jeb Bush	46%	3	1,075	2.99%
Elon University	September 17–23, 2015	Hillary Clinton	41%	Ben Carson	52%	11	1,075	2.99%
Elon University	September 17–23, 2015	Hillary Clinton	47%	Donald Trump	40%	7	1,075	2.99%
Public Policy Polling	August 12–16, 2015	Hillary Clinton	42%	Jeb Bush	42%	Tied	957	3.2%
Public Policy Polling	August 12–16, 2015	Hillary Clinton	40%	Ben Carson	47%	7	957	3.2%
Public Policy Polling	August 12–16, 2015	Hillary Clinton	40%	Chris Christie	39%	1	957	3.2%
Public Policy Polling	August 12–16, 2015	Hillary Clinton	43%	Ted Cruz	45%	2	957	3.2%
Public Policy Polling	August 12–16, 2015	Hillary Clinton	41%	Carly Fiorina	42%	1	957	3.2%
Public Policy Polling	August 12–16, 2015	Hillary Clinton	44%	Mike Huckabee	46%	2	957	3.2%
Public Policy Polling	August 12–16, 2015	Hillary Clinton	40%	John Kasich	41%	1	957	3.2%
Public Policy Polling	August 12–16, 2015	Hillary Clinton	44%	Rand Paul	40%	4	957	3.2%
Public Policy Polling	August 12–16, 2015	Hillary Clinton	41%	Marco Rubio	45%	4	957	3.2%
Public Policy Polling	August 12–16, 2015	Hillary Clinton	42%	Donald Trump	45%	3	957	3.2%
Public Policy Polling	August 12–16, 2015	Hillary Clinton	41%	Scott Walker	44%	3	957	3.2%
Public Policy Polling	August 12–16, 2015	Bernie Sanders	40%	Jeb Bush	43%	3	957	3.2%
Public Policy Polling	August 12–16, 2015	Bernie Sanders	36%	Marco Rubio	42%	6	957	3.2%
Public Policy Polling	August 12–16, 2015	Bernie Sanders	40%	Donald Trump	43%	3	957	3.2%
Public Policy Polling	August 12–16, 2015	Bernie Sanders	37%	Scott Walker	41%	4	957	3.2%
Public Policy Polling	July 2–6, 2015	Hillary Clinton	45%	Jeb Bush	43%	2	529	± 4.3%
Public Policy Polling	July 2–6, 2015	Hillary Clinton	44%	Ben Carson	47%	3	529	± 4.3%
Public Policy Polling	July 2–6, 2015	Hillary Clinton	46%	Chris Christie	43%	3	529	± 4.3%
Public Policy Polling	July 2–6, 2015	Hillary Clinton	47%	Ted Cruz	46%	1	529	± 4.3%
Public Policy Polling	July 2–6, 2015	Hillary Clinton	45%	Carly Fiorina	45%	Tied	529	± 4.3%
Public Policy Polling	July 2–6, 2015	Hillary Clinton	45%	Mike Huckabee	49%	4	529	± 4.3%
Public Policy Polling	July 2–6, 2015	Hillary Clinton	45%	Rand Paul	46%	1	529	± 4.3%
Public Policy Polling	July 2–6, 2015	Hillary Clinton	46%	Marco Rubio	47%	1	529	± 4.3%
Public Policy Polling	July 2–6, 2015	Hillary Clinton	47%	Donald Trump	44%	3	529	± 4.3%
Public Policy Polling	July 2–6, 2015	Hillary Clinton	43%	Scott Walker	47%	4	529	± 4.3%
Public Policy Polling	July 2–6, 2015	Lincoln Chafee	29%	Scott Walker	43%	14	529	± 4.3%
Public Policy Polling	July 2–6, 2015	Martin O'Malley	29%	Scott Walker	45%	16	529	± 4.3%
Public Policy Polling	July 2–6, 2015	Bernie Sanders	35%	Scott Walker	43%	8	529	± 4.3%
Public Policy Polling	July 2–6, 2015	Jim Webb	31%	Scott Walker	44%	13	529	± 4.3%
Public Policy Polling	May 28–31, 2015	Hillary Clinton	47%	Jeb Bush	40%	7	561	± 4.1%
Public Policy Polling	May 28–31, 2015	Hillary Clinton	46%	Ben Carson	44%	2	561	± 4.1%
Public Policy Polling	May 28–31, 2015	Hillary Clinton	43%	Chris Christie	40%	3	561	± 4.1%
Public Policy Polling	May 28–31, 2015	Hillary Clinton	49%	Ted Cruz	42%	7	561	± 4.1%
Public Policy Polling	May 28–31, 2015	Hillary Clinton	46%	Carly Fiorina	40%	6	561	± 4.1%
Public Policy Polling	May 28–31, 2015	Hillary Clinton	46%	Mike Huckabee	42%	4	561	± 4.1%
Public Policy Polling	May 28–31, 2015	Hillary Clinton	44%	Rand Paul	44%	Tied	561	± 4.1%
Public Policy Polling	May 28–31, 2015	Hillary Clinton	46%	Marco Rubio	44%	1	561	± 4.1%
Public Policy Polling	May 28–31, 2015	Hillary Clinton	45%	Scott Walker	45%	Tied	561	± 4.1%
Public Policy Polling	May 28–31, 2015	Lincoln Chafee	29%	Scott Walker	42%	13	561	± 4.1%
Public Policy Polling	May 28–31, 2015	Martin O'Malley	28%	Scott Walker	44%	16	561	± 4.1%
Public Policy Polling	May 28–31, 2015	Bernie Sanders	33%	Scott Walker	43%	10	561	± 4.1%
Public Policy Polling	May 28–31, 2015	Jim Webb	31%	Scott Walker	42%	11	561	± 4.1%
SurveyUSA	April 22–27, 2015	Hillary Clinton	45%	Jeb Bush	43%	2	1,070	± 3.1%
SurveyUSA	April 22–27, 2015	Hillary Clinton	47%	Ted Cruz	42%	5	1,070	± 3.1%
SurveyUSA	April 22–27, 2015	Hillary Clinton	47%	Rand Paul	43%	4	1,070	± 3.1%
SurveyUSA	April 22–27, 2015	Hillary Clinton	46%	Marco Rubio	41%	5	1,070	± 3.1%
SurveyUSA	April 22–27, 2015	Hillary Clinton	48%	Scott Walker	39%	9	1,070	± 3.1%
Elon University	April 20–24, 2015	Hillary Clinton	47.4%	Jeb Bush	44%	3.4	677	± 3.77%
Public Policy Polling	April 2–5, 2015	Hillary Clinton	45%	Jeb Bush	44%	1	751	± 3.6%
Public Policy Polling	April 2–5, 2015	Hillary Clinton	45%	Ben Carson	44%	1	751	± 3.6%
Public Policy Polling	April 2–5, 2015	Hillary Clinton	43%	Chris Christie	41%		751	± 3.6%
Public Policy Polling	April 2–5, 2015	Hillary Clinton	45%	Ted Cruz	45%	Tied	751	± 3.6%
Public Policy Polling	April 2–5, 2015	Hillary Clinton	43%	Mike Huckabee	48%	5	751	± 3.6%
Public Policy Polling	April 2–5, 2015	Hillary Clinton	45%	Rand Paul	45%	Tied	751	± 3.6%
Public Policy Polling	April 2–5, 2015	Hillary Clinton	44%	Rick Perry	45%	1	751	± 3.6%
Public Policy Polling	April 2–5, 2015	Hillary Clinton	45%	Marco Rubio	45%	Tied	751	± 3.6%
Public Policy Polling	April 2–5, 2015	Hillary Clinton	43%	Scott Walker	46%	3	751	± 3.6%
Public Policy Polling	April 2–5, 2015	Joe Biden	39%	Scott Walker	48%	9	751	± 3.6%
Public Policy Polling	April 2–5, 2015	Elizabeth Warren	36%	Scott Walker	46%	10	751	± 3.6%
Public Policy Polling	February 24–26, 2015	Hillary Clinton	46%	Jeb Bush	42%	4	849	3.4%
Public Policy Polling	February 24–26, 2015	Hillary Clinton	45%	Ben Carson	46%	1	849	3.4%
Public Policy Polling	February 24–26, 2015	Hillary Clinton	45%	Chris Christie	42%	3	849	3.4%
Public Policy Polling	February 24–26, 2015	Hillary Clinton	47%	Ted Cruz	43%	4	849	3.4%
Public Policy Polling	February 24–26, 2015	Hillary Clinton	46%	Mike Huckabee	40%	6	849	3.4%
Public Policy Polling	February 24–26, 2015	Hillary Clinton	46%	Rand Paul	43%	3	849	3.4%
Public Policy Polling	February 24–26, 2015	Hillary Clinton	47%	Rick Perry	44%	3	849	3.4%
Public Policy Polling	February 24–26, 2015	Hillary Clinton	46%	Marco Rubio	42%	4	849	3.4%
Public Policy Polling	February 24–26, 2015	Hillary Clinton	45%	Scott Walker	43%	2	849	3.4%
Public Policy Polling	February 24–26, 2015	Joe Biden	40%	Jeb Bush	47%	7	849	3.4%
Public Policy Polling	February 24–26, 2015	Elizabeth Warren	38%	Jeb Bush	44%	8	849	3.4%
Elon University	February 16–20, 2015	Hillary Clinton	45.7%	Jeb Bush	40.2%	5.5	773	± 3.52%
Public Policy Polling	January 29–31, 2015	Hillary Clinton	44%	Jeb Bush	44%	Tied	845	± 3.4%
Public Policy Polling	January 29–31, 2015	Hillary Clinton	45%	Ben Carson	45%	Tied	845	± 3.4%
Public Policy Polling	January 29–31, 2015	Hillary Clinton	44%	Mitt Romney	45%	1	845	± 3.4%
Public Policy Polling	January 29–31, 2015	Hillary Clinton	46%	Scott Walker	44%	2	845	± 3.4%
Public Policy Polling	January 29–31, 2015	Joe Biden	41%	Mitt Romney	48%	7	845	± 3.4%
Public Policy Polling	January 29–31, 2015	Elizabeth Warren	39%	Mitt Romney	47%	8	845	± 3.4%
Meeting Street Research	January 21–22, 2015	Hillary Clinton	46%	Jeb Bush	41%	5	500	± 4.38%
Meeting Street Research	January 21–22, 2015	Hillary Clinton	47%	Mitt Romney	42%	5	500	± 4.38%
Public Policy Polling	December 4–7, 2014	Hillary Clinton	46%	Jeb Bush	46%	Tied	823	± 3.4%
Public Policy Polling	December 4–7, 2014	Hillary Clinton	44%	Ben Carson	44%	Tied	823	± 3.4%
Public Policy Polling	December 4–7, 2014	Hillary Clinton	44%	Chris Christie	42%	2	823	± 3.4%
Public Policy Polling	December 4–7, 2014	Hillary Clinton	46%	Mike Huckabee	44%	2	823	± 3.4%
Public Policy Polling	December 4–7, 2014	Joe Biden	42%	Jeb Bush	47%	5	823	± 3.4%
Public Policy Polling	December 4–7, 2014	Joe Biden	40%	Ben Carson	45%	5	823	± 3.4%
Public Policy Polling	December 4–7, 2014	Elizabeth Warren	39%	Jeb Bush	46%	7	823	± 3.4%
Public Policy Polling	December 4–7, 2014	Elizabeth Warren	37%	Ben Carson	44%	7	823	± 3.4%
Gravis Marketing	October 29–30, 2014	Hillary Clinton	45%	Rand Paul	47%	2	1,006	± 3%
Gravis Marketing	October 29–30, 2014	Elizabeth Warren	34%	Rand Paul	47%	13	1,006	± 3%
Gravis Marketing	October 16–18, 2014	Hillary Clinton	42%	Rand Paul	48%	6	1,022	± 3%
Gravis Marketing	October 16–18, 2014	Elizabeth Warren	32%	Rand Paul	48%	16	1,022	± 3%
Gravis Marketing	September 22–23, 2014	Hillary Clinton	44%	Rand Paul	45%	1	860	± 3%
Gravis Marketing	September 22–23, 2014	Elizabeth Warren	33%	Rand Paul	46%	13	860	± 3%
Public Policy Polling	September 11–14, 2014	Hillary Clinton	43%	Jeb Bush	45%	2	1,266	± 2.8%
Public Policy Polling	September 11–14, 2014	Hillary Clinton	45%	Chris Christie	38%	7	1,266	± 2.8%
Public Policy Polling	September 11–14, 2014	Hillary Clinton	48%	Ted Cruz	40%	8	1,266	± 2.8%
Public Policy Polling	September 11–14, 2014	Hillary Clinton	45%	Mike Huckabee	46%	1	1,266	± 2.8%
Public Policy Polling	September 11–14, 2014	Hillary Clinton	46%	Rand Paul	41%	5	1,266	± 2.8%
Public Policy Polling	August 14–17, 2014	Hillary Clinton	46%	Jeb Bush	42%	4	856	± 3.4%
Public Policy Polling	August 14–17, 2014	Hillary Clinton	45%	Chris Christie	38%	7	856	± 3.4%
Public Policy Polling	August 14–17, 2014	Hillary Clinton	47%	Ted Cruz	41%	6	856	± 3.4%
Public Policy Polling	August 14–17, 2014	Hillary Clinton	45%	Mike Huckabee	44%	1	856	± 3.4%
Public Policy Polling	August 14–17, 2014	Hillary Clinton	47%	Rand Paul	42%	5	856	± 3.4%
Civitas Institute	July 28–29, 2014	Hillary Clinton	47%	Jeb Bush	48%	1	600	± 4%
Civitas Institute	July 28–29, 2014	Hillary Clinton	46%	Chris Christie	47%	1	600	± 4%
Civitas Institute	July 28–29, 2014	Hillary Clinton	48%	Rand Paul	47%	4	600	± 4%
Civitas Institute	July 28–29, 2014	Joe Biden	44%	Jeb Bush	50%	6	600	± 4%
Civitas Institute	July 28–29, 2014	Joe Biden	42%	Chris Christie	49%	7	600	± 4%
Civitas Institute	July 28–29, 2014	Joe Biden	44%	Rand Paul	49%	5	600	± 4%
Gravis Marketing	July 22–27, 2014	Hillary Clinton	45%	Rand Paul	43%	2	1,380	± 3%
Gravis Marketing	July 22–27, 2014	Elizabeth Warren	35%	Rand Paul	44%	9	1,380	± 3%
Public Policy Polling	June 12–15, 2014	Hillary Clinton	45%	Jeb Bush	44%	1	1,076	± 3%
Public Policy Polling	June 12–15, 2014	Hillary Clinton	45%	Chris Christie	41%	4	1,076	± 3%
Public Policy Polling	June 12–15, 2014	Hillary Clinton	46%	Mike Huckabee	43%	3	1,076	± 3%
Public Policy Polling	June 12–15, 2014	Hillary Clinton	46%	Rand Paul	43%	3	1,076	± 3%
Public Policy Polling	May 9–11, 2014	Hillary Clinton	45%	Jeb Bush	42%	3	877	± 3.3%
Public Policy Polling	May 9–11, 2014	Hillary Clinton	44%	Chris Christie	40%	4	877	± 3.3%
Public Policy Polling	May 9–11, 2014	Hillary Clinton	47%	Mike Huckabee	43%	4	877	± 3.3%
Public Policy Polling	May 9–11, 2014	Hillary Clinton	45%	Rand Paul	44%	1	877	± 3.3%
Public Policy Polling	April 3–6, 2014	Hillary Clinton	45%	Jeb Bush	44%	1	740	± 3.6%
Public Policy Polling	April 3–6, 2014	Hillary Clinton	46%	Chris Christie	44%	2	740	± 3.6%
Public Policy Polling	April 3–6, 2014	Hillary Clinton	48%	Mike Huckabee	43%	5	740	± 3.6%
Public Policy Polling	April 3–6, 2014	Hillary Clinton	47%	Rand Paul	43%	4	740	± 3.6%
Public Policy Polling	March 6–9, 2014	Hillary Clinton	47%	Jeb Bush	46%	1	884	± 3.3%
Public Policy Polling	March 6–9, 2014	Hillary Clinton	46%	Chris Christie	42%	4	884	± 3.3%
Public Policy Polling	March 6–9, 2014	Hillary Clinton	49%	Mike Huckabee	42%	7	884	± 3.3%
Public Policy Polling	March 6–9, 2014	Hillary Clinton	49%	Rand Paul	43%	6	884	± 3.3%
Public Policy Polling	February 6–9, 2014	Hillary Clinton	47%	Jeb Bush	43%	4	708	± 3.7%
Public Policy Polling	February 6–9, 2014	Hillary Clinton	45%	Chris Christie	42%	3	708	± 3.7%
Public Policy Polling	February 6–9, 2014	Hillary Clinton	48%	Mike Huckabee	43%	5	708	± 3.7%
Public Policy Polling	February 6–9, 2014	Hillary Clinton	47%	Rand Paul	44%	3	708	± 3.7%
Public Policy Polling	January 9–12, 2014	Hillary Clinton	46%	Jeb Bush	44%	2	1,384	± 2.6%
Public Policy Polling	January 9–12, 2014	Hillary Clinton	42%	Chris Christie	43%	1	1,384	± 2.6%
Public Policy Polling	January 9–12, 2014	Hillary Clinton	47%	Ted Cruz	41%	6	1,384	± 2.6%
Public Policy Polling	January 9–12, 2014	Hillary Clinton	47%	Rand Paul	43%	4	1,384	± 2.6%
Public Policy Polling	December 5–8, 2013	Hillary Clinton	46%	Jeb Bush	45%	1	1,281	± 2.7%
Public Policy Polling	December 5–8, 2013	Hillary Clinton	42%	Chris Christie	45%	3	1,281	± 2.7%
Public Policy Polling	December 5–8, 2013	Hillary Clinton	49%	Ted Cruz	41%	8	1,281	± 2.7%
Public Policy Polling	December 5–8, 2013	Hillary Clinton	48%	Rand Paul	44%	4	1,281	± 2.7%
Public Policy Polling	November 8–11, 2013	Hillary Clinton	47%	Jeb Bush	43%	4	701	± 3.7%
Public Policy Polling	November 8–11, 2013	Hillary Clinton	43%	Chris Christie	46%	3	701	± 3.7%
Public Policy Polling	November 8–11, 2013	Hillary Clinton	51%	Ted Cruz	39%	12	701	± 3.7%
Public Policy Polling	November 8–11, 2013	Hillary Clinton	50%	Rand Paul	41%	9	701	± 3.7%
Public Policy Polling	April 11–14, 2013	Hillary Clinton	52%	Rand Paul	40%	12	601	± 4%
Public Policy Polling	April 11–14, 2013	Hillary Clinton	49%	Marco Rubio	42%	7	601	± 4%

Three-way race

Poll source	Date administered	Democrat	%	Republican	%	Independent/ Third-party candidate	%	Lead margin	Sample size	Margin of error
Public Policy Polling	October 23–25, 2015	Hillary Clinton	41%	Donald Trump	43%	Jim Webb	8%	2	893	3.3%
Public Policy Polling	August 12–16, 2015	Hillary Clinton	38%	Jeb Bush	28%	Donald Trump	27%	10	957	3.2%

== Ohio ==
18 electoral votes
(Democratic in 2008) 51%–47%
(Democratic in 2012) 51%–48%

Poll source	Date administered	Democrat	%	Republican	%	Lead margin	Sample size	Margin of error
Quinnipiac University	September 25 – October 5, 2015	Joe Biden	46%	Jeb Bush	37%	9	1180	2.9%
Quinnipiac University	September 25 – October 5, 2015	Joe Biden	42%	Ben Carson	46%	4	1180	2.9%
Quinnipiac University	September 25 – October 5, 2015	Joe Biden	44%	Carly Fiorna	42%	2	1180	2.9%
Quinnipiac University	September 25 – October 5, 2015	Joe Biden	46%	Marco Rubio	41%	5	1180	2.9%
Quinnipiac University	September 25 – October 5, 2015	Joe Biden	49%	Donald Trump	38%	11	1180	2.9%
Quinnipiac University	September 25 – October 5, 2015	Hillary Clinton	41%	Jeb Bush	43%	2	1180	2.9%
Quinnipiac University	September 25 – October 5, 2015	Hillary Clinton	40%	Ben Carson	49%	9	1180	2.9%
Quinnipiac University	September 25 – October 5, 2015	Hillary Clinton	41%	Carly Fiorna	43%	2	1180	2.9%
Quinnipiac University	September 25 – October 5, 2015	Hillary Clinton	41%	Marco Rubio	45%	4	1180	2.9%
Quinnipiac University	September 25 – October 5, 2015	Hillary Clinton	43%	Donald Trump	42%	1	1180	2.9%
Quinnipiac University	September 25 – October 5, 2015	Bernie Sanders	40%	Jeb Bush	42%	2	1180	2.9%
Quinnipiac University	September 25 – October 5, 2015	Bernie Sanders	36%	Ben Carson	48%	12	1180	2.9%
Quinnipiac University	September 25 – October 5, 2015	Bernie Sanders	39%	Carly Fiorna	43%	4	1180	2.9%
Quinnipiac University	September 25 – October 5, 2015	Bernie Sanders	40%	Marco Rubio	43%	3	1180	2.9%
Quinnipiac University	September 25 – October 5, 2015	Bernie Sanders	44%	Donald Trump	41%	3	1180	2.9%
Quinnipiac University	August 7–18, 2015	Hillary Clinton	43%	Donald Trump	38%	5	1,096	± 3%
Quinnipiac University	August 7–18, 2015	Hillary Clinton	41%	Jeb Bush	39%	2	1,096	± 3%
Quinnipiac University	August 7–18, 2015	Hillary Clinton	40%	Marco Rubio	42%	2	1,096	± 3%
Quinnipiac University	August 7–18, 2015	Joe Biden	48%	Donald Trump	38%	10	1,096	± 3%
Quinnipiac University	August 7–18, 2015	Joe Biden	42%	Jeb Bush	39%	3	1,096	± 3%
Quinnipiac University	August 7–18, 2015	Joe Biden	42%	Marco Rubio	41%	1	1,096	± 3%
Quinnipiac University	August 7–18, 2015	Bernie Sanders	42%	Donald Trump	40%	2	1,096	± 3%
Quinnipiac University	August 7–18, 2015	Bernie Sanders	36%	Jeb Bush	42%	6	1,096	± 3%
Quinnipiac University	August 7–18, 2015	Bernie Sanders	34%	Marco Rubio	42%	8	1,096	± 3%
Quinnipiac University	June 4–15, 2015	Hillary Clinton	42%	Jeb Bush	41%	1	1,191	± 2.8%
Quinnipiac University	June 4–15, 2015	Hillary Clinton	44%	Chris Christie	39%	5	1,191	± 2.8%
Quinnipiac University	June 4–15, 2015	Hillary Clinton	47%	Ted Cruz	39%	8	1,191	± 2.8%
Quinnipiac University	June 4–15, 2015	Hillary Clinton	46%	Mike Huckabee	41%	5	1,191	± 2.8%
Quinnipiac University	June 4–15, 2015	Hillary Clinton	40%	John Kasich	47%	7	1,191	± 2.8%
Quinnipiac University	June 4–15, 2015	Hillary Clinton	43%	Rand Paul	43%	Tied	1,191	± 2.8%
Quinnipiac University	June 4–15, 2015	Hillary Clinton	45%	Marco Rubio	42%	3	1,191	± 2.8%
Quinnipiac University	June 4–15, 2015	Hillary Clinton	44%	Scott Walker	40%	4	1,191	± 2.8%
Public Policy Polling	June 4–7, 2015	Hillary Clinton	45%	Jeb Bush	43%	2	859	± 3.3%
Public Policy Polling	June 4–7, 2015	Hillary Clinton	44%	Ben Carson	43%	1	859	± 3.3%
Public Policy Polling	June 4–7, 2015	Hillary Clinton	44%	Chris Christie	41%	3	859	± 3.3%
Public Policy Polling	June 4–7, 2015	Hillary Clinton	44%	Ted Cruz	43%	1	859	± 3.3%
Public Policy Polling	June 4–7, 2015	Hillary Clinton	45%	Mike Huckabee	42%	3	859	± 3.3%
Public Policy Polling	June 4–7, 2015	Hillary Clinton	40%	John Kasich	47%	7	859	± 3.3%
Public Policy Polling	June 4–7, 2015	Hillary Clinton	41%	Rand Paul	44%	3	859	± 3.3%
Public Policy Polling	June 4–7, 2015	Hillary Clinton	44%	Marco Rubio	44%	Tied	859	± 3.3%
Public Policy Polling	June 4–7, 2015	Hillary Clinton	44%	Scott Walker	43%	1	859	± 3.3%
Public Policy Polling	June 4–7, 2015	Michael Bloomberg	32%	Scott Walker	40%	8	859	± 3.3%
Public Policy Polling	June 4–7, 2015	Lincoln Chafee	24%	Scott Walker	39%	15	859	± 3.3%
Public Policy Polling	June 4–7, 2015	Martin O'Malley	26%	Scott Walker	41%	15	859	± 3.3%
Public Policy Polling	June 4–7, 2015	Bernie Sanders	30%	Scott Walker	40%	10	859	± 3.3%
Public Policy Polling	June 4–7, 2015	Jim Webb	25%	Scott Walker	41%	16	859	± 3.3%
Quinnipiac University	March 17–28, 2015	Hillary Clinton	47%	Jeb Bush	38%	9	1,077	± 3%
Quinnipiac University	March 17–28, 2015	Hillary Clinton	45%	Chris Christie	39%	6	1,077	± 3%
Quinnipiac University	March 17–28, 2015	Hillary Clinton	48%	Ted Cruz	38%	12	1,077	± 3%
Quinnipiac University	March 17–28, 2015	Hillary Clinton	49%	Mike Huckabee	39%	10	1,077	± 3%
Quinnipiac University	March 17–28, 2015	Hillary Clinton	46%	Rand Paul	41%	5	1,077	± 3%
Quinnipiac University	March 17–28, 2015	Hillary Clinton	47%	Marco Rubio	38%	9	1,077	± 3%
Quinnipiac University	March 17–28, 2015	Hillary Clinton	49%	Scott Walker	38%	11	1,077	± 3%
Public Policy Polling↑	March 2–3, 2015	Hillary Clinton	45%	Jeb Bush	40%	5	946	± ?
Public Policy Polling↑	March 2–3, 2015	Hillary Clinton	49%	Scott Walker	41%	8	946	± ?
Quinnipiac University	January 22 – February 1, 2015	Hillary Clinton	47%	Jeb Bush	36%	11	943	± 3.2%
Quinnipiac University	January 22 – February 1, 2015	Hillary Clinton	47%	Chris Christie	34%	13	943	± 3.2%
Quinnipiac University	January 22 – February 1, 2015	Hillary Clinton	49%	Mike Huckabee	34%	15	943	± 3.2%
Quinnipiac University	January 22 – February 1, 2015	Hillary Clinton	44%	John Kasich	43%	1	943	± 3.2%
Quinnipiac University	January 22 – February 1, 2015	Hillary Clinton	48%	Rand Paul	36%	12	943	± 3.2%
Fox News	October 28–30, 2014	Hillary Clinton	48%	Jeb Bush	38%	10	803	± 3%
Fox News	October 28–30, 2014	Hillary Clinton	46%	Chris Christie	39%	7	803	± 3%
Fox News	October 28–30, 2014	Hillary Clinton	47%	John Kasich	43%	4	803	± 3%
Fox News	October 28–30, 2014	Hillary Clinton	49%	Rand Paul	40%	9	803	± 3%
Fox News	October 28–30, 2014	Hillary Clinton	49%	Rick Perry	39%	10	803	± 3%
Quinnipiac	July 24–28, 2014	Hillary Clinton	48%	Jeb Bush	37%	11	1,366	± 2.7%
Quinnipiac	July 24–28, 2014	Hillary Clinton	46%	Chris Christie	37%	9	1,366	± 2.7%
Quinnipiac	July 24–28, 2014	Hillary Clinton	47%	John Kasich	40%	7	1,366	± 2.7%
Quinnipiac	July 24–28, 2014	Hillary Clinton	46%	Rand Paul	42%	4	1,366	± 2.7%
Quinnipiac	May 7–12, 2014	Hillary Clinton	48%	Jeb Bush	39%	9	1,174	± 2.9%
Quinnipiac	May 7–12, 2014	Hillary Clinton	46%	Chris Christie	38%	8	1,174	± 2.9%
Quinnipiac	May 7–12, 2014	Hillary Clinton	51%	Ted Cruz	37%	14	1,174	± 2.9%
Quinnipiac	May 7–12, 2014	Hillary Clinton	49%	Mike Huckabee	41%	8	1,174	± 2.9%
Quinnipiac	May 7–12, 2014	Hillary Clinton	47%	John Kasich	42%	5	1,174	± 2.9%
Quinnipiac	May 7–12, 2014	Hillary Clinton	49%	Rand Paul	41%	8	1,174	± 2.9%
Quinnipiac	May 7–12, 2014	Hillary Clinton	47%	Marco Rubio	40%	7	1,174	± 2.9%
Quinnipiac	May 7–12, 2014	Hillary Clinton	48%	Paul Ryan	41%	7	1,174	± 2.9%
Quinnipiac	February 12–17, 2014	Hillary Clinton	51%	Jeb Bush	36%	15	1,370	± 2.7%
Quinnipiac	February 12–17, 2014	Hillary Clinton	49%	Chris Christie	36%	13	1,370	± 2.7%
Quinnipiac	February 12–17, 2014	Hillary Clinton	51%	Ted Cruz	34%	17	1,370	± 2.7%
Quinnipiac	February 12–17, 2014	Hillary Clinton	51%	John Kasich	39%	12	1,370	± 2.7%
Quinnipiac	February 12–17, 2014	Hillary Clinton	51%	Rand Paul	38%	13	1,370	± 2.7%
Quinnipiac	February 12–17, 2014	Hillary Clinton	50%	Marco Rubio	36%	14	1,370	± 2.7%
Quinnipiac	February 12–17, 2014	Hillary Clinton	49%	Paul Ryan	40%	9	1,370	± 2.7%
Quinnipiac	November 19–24, 2013	Hillary Clinton	50%	Jeb Bush	37%	13	1,361	± 2.7%
Quinnipiac	November 19–24, 2013	Hillary Clinton	42%	Chris Christie	41%	1	1,361	± 2.7%
Quinnipiac	November 19–24, 2013	Hillary Clinton	50%	Ted Cruz	35%	15	1,361	± 2.7%
Quinnipiac	November 19–24, 2013	Hillary Clinton	49%	John Kasich	38%	11	1,361	± 2.7%
Quinnipiac	November 19–24, 2013	Hillary Clinton	50%	Rand Paul	40%	10	1,361	± 2.7%
Quinnipiac	November 19–24, 2013	Hillary Clinton	48%	Marco Rubio	39%	9	1,361	± 2.7%
Quinnipiac	November 19–24, 2013	Hillary Clinton	49%	Paul Ryan	41%	8	1,361	± 2.7%
Public Policy Polling	August 16–19, 2013	Hillary Clinton	50%	Jeb Bush	36%	14	551	± 4.2%
Public Policy Polling	August 16–19, 2013	Hillary Clinton	45%	Chris Christie	36%	9	551	± 4.2%
Public Policy Polling	August 16–19, 2013	Hillary Clinton	53%	John Kasich	35%	18	551	± 4.2%
Public Policy Polling	August 16–19, 2013	Hillary Clinton	51%	Rand Paul	36%	15	551	± 4.2%
Public Policy Polling	August 16–19, 2013	Hillary Clinton	52%	Paul Ryan	36%	16	551	± 4.2%
Quinnipiac	June 18–23, 2013	Hillary Clinton	42%	Chris Christie	42%	Tied	941	± 3.2%
Quinnipiac	June 18–23, 2013	Hillary Clinton	47%	Rand Paul	44%	3	941	± 3.2%
Quinnipiac	June 18–23, 2013	Joe Biden	32%	Chris Christie	50%	18	941	± 3.2%
Quinnipiac	June 18–23, 2013	Joe Biden	40%	Rand Paul	49%	9	941	± 3.2%

- ↑ Poll conducted for the Ohio Democratic Party

Three-way race

Poll source	Date administered	Democrat	%	Republican	%	Independent/ Third-party candidate	%	Lead margin	Sample size	Margin of error
Quinnipiac University	August 7–18, 2015	Hillary Clinton	37%	Jeb Bush	27%	Donald Trump	23%	10	1096	3%

== Oregon ==
7 electoral votes
(Democratic in 2008) 57%–40%
(Democratic in 2012) 54%–42%

Poll source	Date administered	Democrat	%	Republican	%	Lead margin	Sample size	Margin of error
Public Policy Polling	May 22–27, 2014	Hillary Clinton	51%	Jeb Bush	36%	15	956	± 3.2%
Public Policy Polling	May 22–27, 2014	Hillary Clinton	51%	Chris Christie	34%	17	956	± 3.2%
Public Policy Polling	May 22–27, 2014	Hillary Clinton	52%	Ted Cruz	37%	15	956	± 3.2%
Public Policy Polling	May 22–27, 2014	Hillary Clinton	51%	Mike Huckabee	39%	12	956	± 3.2%
Public Policy Polling	May 22–27, 2014	Hillary Clinton	51%	Rand Paul	39%	12	956	± 3.2%

== Pennsylvania ==
20 electoral votes
(Democratic in 2008) 54%–44%
(Democratic in 2012) 52%–47%

Poll source	Date administered	Democrat	%	Republican	%	Lead margin	Sample size	Margin of error
Public Policy Polling	October 8–11, 2015	Hillary Clinton	45%	Jeb Bush	40%	5	1,012	± 3.1%
Public Policy Polling	October 8–11, 2015	Hillary Clinton	43%	Ben Carson	47%	4	1,012	± 3.1%
Public Policy Polling	October 8–11, 2015	Hillary Clinton	46%	Ted Cruz	40%	6	1,012	± 3.1%
Public Policy Polling	October 8–11, 2015	Hillary Clinton	42%	Carly Fiorina	43%	1	1,012	± 3.1%
Public Policy Polling	October 8–11, 2015	Hillary Clinton	47%	Mike Huckabee	38%	9	1,012	± 3.1%
Public Policy Polling	October 8–11, 2015	Hillary Clinton	41%	John Kasich	39%	2	1,012	± 3.1%
Public Policy Polling	October 8–11, 2015	Hillary Clinton	42%	Marco Rubio	45%	3	1,012	± 3.1%
Public Policy Polling	October 8–11, 2015	Hillary Clinton	47%	Rick Santorum	39%	8	1,012	± 3.1%
Public Policy Polling	October 8–11, 2015	Hillary Clinton	43%	Donald Trump	45%	2	1,012	± 3.1%
Public Policy Polling	October 8–11, 2015	Joe Biden	46%	Ben Carson	44%	2	1,012	± 3.1%
Public Policy Polling	October 8–11, 2015	Joe Biden	46%	Carly Fiorina	40%	6	1,012	± 3.1%
Public Policy Polling	October 8–11, 2015	Joe Biden	45%	Marco Rubio	41%	4	1,012	± 3.1%
Public Policy Polling	October 8–11, 2015	Joe Biden	45%	Donald Trump	43%	2	1,012	± 3.1%
Public Policy Polling	October 8–11, 2015	Bernie Sanders	36%	Ben Carson	44%	8	1,012	± 3.1%
Public Policy Polling	October 8–11, 2015	Bernie Sanders	38%	Carly Fiorina	40%	2	1,012	± 3.1%
Public Policy Polling	October 8–11, 2015	Bernie Sanders	40%	Marco Rubio	41%	5	1,012	± 3.1%
Public Policy Polling	October 8–11, 2015	Bernie Sanders	42%	Donald Trump	46%	4	1,012	± 3.1%
Quinnipiac University	September 25 – October 5, 2015	Joe Biden	45%	Jeb Bush	42%	3	1049	3%
Quinnipiac University	September 25 – October 5, 2015	Joe Biden	42%	Ben Carson	47%	5	1049	3%
Quinnipiac University	September 25 – October 5, 2015	Joe Biden	44%	Carly Fiorna	43%	1	1049	3%
Quinnipiac University	September 25 – October 5, 2015	Joe Biden	45%	Marco Rubio	43%	2	1049	3%
Quinnipiac University	September 25 – October 5, 2015	Joe Biden	50%	Donald Trump	40%	10	1049	3%
Quinnipiac University	September 25 – October 5, 2015	Hillary Clinton	40%	Jeb Bush	46%	6	1049	3%
Quinnipiac University	September 25 – October 5, 2015	Hillary Clinton	40%	Ben Carson	49%	9	1049	3%
Quinnipiac University	September 25 – October 5, 2015	Hillary Clinton	41%	Carly Fiorna	45%	4	1049	3%
Quinnipiac University	September 25 – October 5, 2015	Hillary Clinton	42%	Marco Rubio	45%	3	1049	3%
Quinnipiac University	September 25 – October 5, 2015	Hillary Clinton	44%	Donald Trump	42%	2	1049	3%
Quinnipiac University	September 25 – October 5, 2015	Bernie Sanders	42%	Jeb Bush	44%	2	1049	3%
Quinnipiac University	September 25 – October 5, 2015	Bernie Sanders	37%	Ben Carson	47%	10	1049	3%
Quinnipiac University	September 25 – October 5, 2015	Bernie Sanders	40%	Carly Fiorna	44%	4	1049	3%
Quinnipiac University	September 25 – October 5, 2015	Bernie Sanders	39%	Marco Rubio	45%	6	1049	3%
Quinnipiac University	September 25 – October 5, 2015	Bernie Sanders	46%	Donald Trump	41%	5	1049	3%
Quinnipiac University	August 7–18, 2015	Hillary Clinton	45%	Donald Trump	40%	5	1,085	± 3%
Quinnipiac University	August 7–18, 2015	Hillary Clinton	40%	Jeb Bush	43%	3	1,085	± 3%
Quinnipiac University	August 7–18, 2015	Hillary Clinton	40%	Marco Rubio	47%	7	1,085	± 3%
Quinnipiac University	August 7–18, 2015	Joe Biden	48%	Donald Trump	40%	8	1,085	± 3%
Quinnipiac University	August 7–18, 2015	Joe Biden	42%	Jeb Bush	43%	1	1,085	± 3%
Quinnipiac University	August 7–18, 2015	Joe Biden	41%	Marco Rubio	44%	3	1,085	± 3%
Quinnipiac University	August 7–18, 2015	Bernie Sanders	44%	Donald Trump	41%	3	1,085	± 3%
Quinnipiac University	August 7–18, 2015	Bernie Sanders	36%	Jeb Bush	44%	8	1,085	± 3%
Quinnipiac University	August 7–18, 2015	Bernie Sanders	33%	Marco Rubio	45%	12	1,085	± 3%
Quinnipiac University	June 4–15, 2015	Hillary Clinton	45%	Jeb Bush	41%	4	970	± 3.2%
Quinnipiac University	June 4–15, 2015	Hillary Clinton	43%	Chris Christie	41%	2	970	± 3.2%
Quinnipiac University	June 4–15, 2015	Hillary Clinton	47%	Ted Cruz	40%	7	970	± 3.2%
Quinnipiac University	June 4–15, 2015	Hillary Clinton	46%	Mike Huckabee	39%	7	970	± 3.2%
Quinnipiac University	June 4–15, 2015	Hillary Clinton	45%	John Kasich	39%	6	970	± 3.2%
Quinnipiac University	June 4–15, 2015	Hillary Clinton	44%	Rand Paul	45%	1	970	± 3.2%
Quinnipiac University	June 4–15, 2015	Hillary Clinton	43%	Marco Rubio	44%	1	970	± 3.2%
Quinnipiac University	June 4–15, 2015	Hillary Clinton	46%	Scott Walker	41%	5	970	± 3.2%
Public Policy Polling	May 21–24, 2015	Hillary Clinton	49%	Jeb Bush	38%	11	799	± 3.5%
Public Policy Polling	May 21–24, 2015	Hillary Clinton	48%	Ben Carson	42%	6	799	± 3.5%
Public Policy Polling	May 21–24, 2015	Hillary Clinton	46%	Chris Christie	41%	5	799	± 3.5%
Public Policy Polling	May 21–24, 2015	Hillary Clinton	49%	Ted Cruz	41%	8	799	± 3.5%
Public Policy Polling	May 21–24, 2015	Hillary Clinton	47%	Mike Huckabee	42%	5	799	± 3.5%
Public Policy Polling	May 21–24, 2015	Hillary Clinton	46%	Rand Paul	43%	3	799	± 3.5%
Public Policy Polling	May 21–24, 2015	Hillary Clinton	46%	Marco Rubio	45%	1	799	± 3.5%
Public Policy Polling	May 21–24, 2015	Hillary Clinton	49%	Rick Santorum	42%	7	799	± 3.5%
Public Policy Polling	May 21–24, 2015	Hillary Clinton	45%	Scott Walker	41%	4	799	± 3.5%
Public Policy Polling	May 21–24, 2015	Lincoln Chafee	27%	Scott Walker	36%	9	799	± 3.5%
Public Policy Polling	May 21–24, 2015	Martin O'Malley	30%	Scott Walker	38%	8	799	± 3.5%
Public Policy Polling	May 21–24, 2015	Bernie Sanders	32%	Scott Walker	37%	5	799	± 3.5%
Public Policy Polling	May 21–24, 2015	Jim Webb	29%	Scott Walker	36%	8	799	± 3.5%
Quinnipiac University	March 17–28, 2015	Hillary Clinton	46%	Jeb Bush	40%	6	1,036	± 3%
Quinnipiac University	March 17–28, 2015	Hillary Clinton	45%	Chris Christie	40%	5	1,036	± 3%
Quinnipiac University	March 17–28, 2015	Hillary Clinton	48%	Ted Cruz	39%	9	1,036	± 3%
Quinnipiac University	March 17–28, 2015	Hillary Clinton	47%	Mike Huckabee	41%	6	1,036	± 3%
Quinnipiac University	March 17–28, 2015	Hillary Clinton	44%	Rand Paul	45%	1	1,036	± 3%
Quinnipiac University	March 17–28, 2015	Hillary Clinton	46%	Marco Rubio	42%	4	1,036	± 3%
Quinnipiac University	March 17–28, 2015	Hillary Clinton	46%	Scott Walker	41%	5	1,036	± 3%
Muhlenberg College	January 28 – February 11, 2015	Hillary Clinton	48%	Jeb Bush	32%	16	351	± 7%
Muhlenberg College	January 28 – February 11, 2015	Hillary Clinton	50%	Chris Christie	31%	19	351	± 7%
Muhlenberg College	January 28 – February 11, 2015	Hillary Clinton	?%	Mitt Romney	?%	?	351	± 7%
Quinnipiac University	January 22 – February 1, 2015	Hillary Clinton	50%	Jeb Bush	35%	15	881	± 3.3%
Quinnipiac University	January 22 – February 1, 2015	Hillary Clinton	50%	Chris Christie	39%	11	881	± 3.3%
Quinnipiac University	January 22 – February 1, 2015	Hillary Clinton	54%	Mike Huckabee	34%	20	881	± 3.3%
Quinnipiac University	January 22 – February 1, 2015	Hillary Clinton	53%	Rand Paul	34%	19	881	± 3.3%
Quinnipiac University	January 22 – February 1, 2015	Hillary Clinton	54%	Rick Santorum	34%	20	881	± 3.3%
Public Policy Polling	January 15–18, 2015	Hillary Clinton	49%	Jeb Bush	38%	11	1,042	± 3%
Public Policy Polling	January 15–18, 2015	Hillary Clinton	51%	Ben Carson	37%	14	1,042	± 3%
Public Policy Polling	January 15–18, 2015	Hillary Clinton	49%	Chris Christie	39%	10	1,042	± 3%
Public Policy Polling	January 15–18, 2015	Hillary Clinton	51%	Mike Huckabee	39%	12	1,042	± 3%
Public Policy Polling	January 15–18, 2015	Hillary Clinton	50%	Rand Paul	39%	11	1,042	± 3%
Public Policy Polling	January 15–18, 2015	Hillary Clinton	50%	Mitt Romney	40%	10	1,042	± 3%
Public Policy Polling	January 15–18, 2015	Hillary Clinton	52%	Rick Santorum	36%	16	1,042	± 3%
Public Policy Polling	January 15–18, 2015	Joe Biden	41%	Mitt Romney	43%	2	1,042	± 3%
Public Policy Polling	January 15–18, 2015	Elizabeth Warren	36%	Mitt Romney	44%	8	1,042	± 3%
Public Policy Polling	May 30 – June 1, 2014	Hillary Clinton	51%	Jeb Bush	37%	14	835	± 3.4%
Public Policy Polling	May 30 – June 1, 2014	Hillary Clinton	49%	Chris Christie	39%	10	835	± 3.4%
Public Policy Polling	May 30 – June 1, 2014	Hillary Clinton	53%	Ted Cruz	34%	19	835	± 3.4%
Public Policy Polling	May 30 – June 1, 2014	Hillary Clinton	52%	Mike Huckabee	37%	15	835	± 3.4%
Public Policy Polling	May 30 – June 1, 2014	Hillary Clinton	52%	Rand Paul	38%	14	835	± 3.4%
Public Policy Polling	May 30 – June 1, 2014	Hillary Clinton	51%	Rick Santorum	40%	11	835	± 3.4%
Quinnipiac	May 29 – June 2, 2014	Hillary Clinton	51%	Jeb Bush	35%	16	1,308	± 2.7%
Quinnipiac	May 29 – June 2, 2014	Hillary Clinton	45%	Chris Christie	41%	4	1,308	± 2.7%
Quinnipiac	May 29 – June 2, 2014	Hillary Clinton	51%	Mike Huckabee	36%	15	1,308	± 2.7%
Quinnipiac	May 29 – June 2, 2014	Hillary Clinton	51%	Rand Paul	37%	14	1,308	± 2.7%
Quinnipiac	May 29 – June 2, 2014	Hillary Clinton	50%	Paul Ryan	38%	12	1,308	± 2.7%
Quinnipiac	February 19–24, 2014	Hillary Clinton	53%	Jeb Bush	36%	17	1,405	± 2.6%
Quinnipiac	February 19–24, 2014	Hillary Clinton	46%	Chris Christie	41%	5	1,405	± 2.6%
Quinnipiac	February 19–24, 2014	Hillary Clinton	54%	Ted Cruz	34%	20	1,405	± 2.6%
Quinnipiac	February 19–24, 2014	Hillary Clinton	53%	Rand Paul	38%	15	1,405	± 2.6%
Quinnipiac	February 19–24, 2014	Hillary Clinton	53%	Rick Santorum	37%	16	1,405	± 2.6%
Quinnipiac	December 11–16, 2013	Hillary Clinton	52%	Jeb Bush	36%	16	1,061	± 3%
Quinnipiac	December 11–16, 2013	Hillary Clinton	44%	Chris Christie	43%	1	1,061	± 3%
Quinnipiac	December 11–16, 2013	Hillary Clinton	54%	Ted Cruz	36%	18	1,061	± 3%
Quinnipiac	December 11–16, 2013	Hillary Clinton	52%	Rand Paul	40%	12	1,061	± 3%
Quinnipiac	December 11–16, 2013	Hillary Clinton	51%	Rick Santorum	38%	13	1,061	± 3%
Public Policy Polling	November 22–25, 2013	Hillary Clinton	48%	Jeb Bush	44%	4	693	± 3.7%
Public Policy Polling	November 22–25, 2013	Hillary Clinton	44%	Chris Christie	48%	4	693	± 3.7%
Public Policy Polling	November 22–25, 2013	Hillary Clinton	53%	Ted Cruz	41%	12	693	± 3.7%
Public Policy Polling	November 22–25, 2013	Hillary Clinton	51%	Rand Paul	43%	8	693	± 3.7%
Public Policy Polling	November 22–25, 2013	Hillary Clinton	51%	Rick Santorum	42%	9	693	± 3.7%
Quinnipiac	May 30 – June 4, 2013	Hillary Clinton	52%	Rand Paul	37%	15	1,032	± 3.1%
Quinnipiac	May 30 – June 4, 2013	Hillary Clinton	53%	Rick Santorum	36%	17	1,032	± 3.1%
Quinnipiac	May 30 – June 4, 2013	Joe Biden	45%	Rand Paul	41%	4	1,032	± 3.1%
Quinnipiac	May 30 – June 4, 2013	Joe Biden	46%	Rick Santorum	39%	7	1,032	± 3.1%
Public Policy Polling	March 8–10, 2013	Hillary Clinton	52%	Marco Rubio	37%	15	504	± 4.4%
Public Policy Polling	March 8–10, 2013	Hillary Clinton	52%	Paul Ryan	40%	12	504	± 4.4%
Public Policy Polling	March 8–10, 2013	Hillary Clinton	55%	Rick Santorum	38%	17	504	± 4.4%
Quinnipiac	March 6–11, 2013	Hillary Clinton	47%	Chris Christie	42%	5	1,116	± 2.9%
Quinnipiac	March 6–11, 2013	Hillary Clinton	54%	Marco Rubio	36%	18	1,116	± 2.9%
Quinnipiac	March 6–11, 2013	Hillary Clinton	55%	Paul Ryan	38%	17	1,116	± 2.9%
Quinnipiac	March 6–11, 2013	Joe Biden	38%	Chris Christie	51%	13	1,116	± 2.9%
Quinnipiac	March 6–11, 2013	Joe Biden	45%	Marco Rubio	41%	4	1,116	± 2.9%
Quinnipiac	March 6–11, 2013	Joe Biden	44%	Paul Ryan	47%	13	1,116	± 2.9%
Quinnipiac	March 6–11, 2013	Andrew Cuomo	32%	Chris Christie	53%	21	1,116	± 2.9%
Quinnipiac	March 6–11, 2013	Andrew Cuomo	42%	Marco Rubio	38%	4	1,116	± 2.9%
Quinnipiac	March 6–11, 2013	Andrew Cuomo	44%	Paul Ryan	41%	3	1,116	± 2.9%

Three-way race

Poll Source	Date administered	Democrat	%	Republican	%	Independent/ Third-party candidate	%	Lead margin	Sample size	Margin of error
Quinnipiac University	August 7–18, 2015	Hillary Clinton	37%	Jeb Bush	29%	Donald Trump	24%	8	1,085	3%

== South Carolina ==
9 electoral votes
(Republican in 2008) 54%–45%
(Republican in 2012) 55%–44%

Poll source	Date administered	Democrat	%	Republican	%	Lead margin	Sample size	Margin of error
Public Policy Polling	November 7–8, 2015	Hillary Clinton	41%	Jeb Bush	47%	6	1,290	± 2.7%
Public Policy Polling	November 7–8, 2015	Hillary Clinton	39%	Ben Carson	51%	12	1,290	± 2.7%
Public Policy Polling	November 7–8, 2015	Hillary Clinton	43%	Ted Cruz	46%	3	1,290	± 2.7%
Public Policy Polling	November 7–8, 2015	Hillary Clinton	41%	Carly Fiorina	45%	4	1,290	± 2.7%
Public Policy Polling	November 7–8, 2015	Hillary Clinton	43%	Mike Huckabee	47%	4	1,290	± 2.7%
Public Policy Polling	November 7–8, 2015	Hillary Clinton	41%	John Kasich	43%	2	1,290	± 2.7%
Public Policy Polling	November 7–8, 2015	Hillary Clinton	42%	Marco Rubio	47%	5	1,290	± 2.7%
Public Policy Polling	November 7–8, 2015	Hillary Clinton	42%	Donald Trump	47%	5	1,290	± 2.7%
Public Policy Polling	November 7–8, 2015	Bernie Sanders	35%	Jeb Bush	48%	13	1,290	± 2.7%
Public Policy Polling	November 7–8, 2015	Bernie Sanders	33%	Ben Carson	51%	18	1,290	± 2.7%
Public Policy Polling	November 7–8, 2015	Bernie Sanders	35%	Ted Cruz	45%	10	1,290	± 2.7%
Public Policy Polling	November 7–8, 2015	Bernie Sanders	33%	Marco Rubio	46%	13	1,290	± 2.7%
Public Policy Polling	November 7–8, 2015	Bernie Sanders	38%	Donald Trump	48%	10	1,290	± 2.7%
Public Policy Polling	September 3–6, 2015	Hillary Clinton	37%	Jeb Bush	47%	10	1,115	
Public Policy Polling	September 3–6, 2015	Hillary Clinton	36%	Ben Carson	54%	18	1,115	
Public Policy Polling	September 3–6, 2015	Hillary Clinton	39%	Ted Cruz	48%	9	1,115	
Public Policy Polling	September 3–6, 2015	Hillary Clinton	38%	Carly Fiorina	48%	10	1,115	
Public Policy Polling	September 3–6, 2015	Hillary Clinton	39%	Lindsey Graham	38%	1	1,115	
Public Policy Polling	September 3–6, 2015	Hillary Clinton	39%	Mike Huckabee	49%	10	1,115	
Public Policy Polling	September 3–6, 2015	Hillary Clinton	38%	John Kasich	42%	4	1,115	
Public Policy Polling	September 3–6, 2015	Hillary Clinton	40%	Marco Rubio	46%	6	1,115	
Public Policy Polling	September 3–6, 2015	Hillary Clinton	39%	Donald Trump	50%	11	1,115	
Public Policy Polling	September 3–6, 2015	Hillary Clinton	39%	Scott Walker	48%	9	1,115	
Public Policy Polling	September 3–6, 2015	Bernie Sanders	32%	Jeb Bush	48%	16	1,115	
Public Policy Polling	September 3–6, 2015	Bernie Sanders	27%	Ben Carson	51%	24	1,115	
Public Policy Polling	September 3–6, 2015	Bernie Sanders	28%	Carly Fiorina	45%	17	1,115	
Public Policy Polling	September 3–6, 2015	Bernie Sanders	33%	Lindsey Graham	39%	6	1,115	
Public Policy Polling	September 3–6, 2015	Bernie Sanders	35%	Donald Trump	51%	16	1,115	
Public Policy Polling	September 3–6, 2015	Bernie Sanders	30%	Scott Walker	46%	16	1,115	
Public Policy Polling	September 3–6, 2015	Joe Biden	39%	Donald Trump	51%	12	1,115	
Public Policy Polling	February 12–15, 2015	Hillary Clinton	42%	Jeb Bush	49%	7	868	± 3.3%
Public Policy Polling	February 12–15, 2015	Hillary Clinton	41%	Ben Carson	48%	7	868	± 3.3%
Public Policy Polling	February 12–15, 2015	Hillary Clinton	41%	Chris Christie	43%	2	868	± 3.3%
Public Policy Polling	February 12–15, 2015	Hillary Clinton	43%	Ted Cruz	46%	3	868	± 3.3%
Public Policy Polling	February 12–15, 2015	Hillary Clinton	43%	Lindsey Graham	45%	2	868	± 3.3%
Public Policy Polling	February 12–15, 2015	Hillary Clinton	41%	Mike Huckabee	49%	8	868	± 3.3%
Public Policy Polling	February 12–15, 2015	Hillary Clinton	43%	Rand Paul	45%	2	868	± 3.3%
Public Policy Polling	February 12–15, 2015	Hillary Clinton	43%	Rick Perry	48%	5	868	± 3.3%
Public Policy Polling	February 12–15, 2015	Hillary Clinton	42%	Scott Walker	46%	4	868	± 3.3%
Public Policy Polling	February 12–15, 2015	Joe Biden	36%	Jeb Bush	53%	17	868	± 3.3%
Public Policy Polling	February 12–15, 2015	Elizabeth Warren	34%	Jeb Bush	50%	16	868	± 3.3%
NBC News/Marist	February 3–10, 2015	Hillary Clinton	45%	Jeb Bush	48%	3	877	± 3.3%
NBC News/Marist	February 3–10, 2015	Hillary Clinton	46%	Scott Walker	46%	Tied	877	± 3.3%
Harper Polling	October 27–28, 2013	Hillary Clinton	38%	Chris Christie	43%	5	676	± 3.77%
Harper Polling	October 27–28, 2013	Hillary Clinton	42%	Ted Cruz	41%	1	676	± 3.77%
Harper Polling	October 27–28, 2013	Hillary Clinton	40%	Marco Rubio	47%	7	676	± 3.77%

Three-way race

Poll source	Date administered	Democrat	%	Republican	%	Independent/ Third-party candidate	%	Lead margin	Sample size	Margin of error
Public Policy Polling	September 3–6, 2015	Hillary Clinton	34%	Jeb Bush	25%	Donald Trump	33%	1	1,115	

== Texas ==
38 electoral votes
(Republican in 2008) 55%–44%
(Republican in 2012) 57%–41%

Poll source	Date administered	Democrat	%	Republican	%	Lead margin	Sample size	Margin of error
The Texas Lyceum	Sept 8–21, 2015	Hillary Clinton	37%	Donald Trump	39%	2	633 LV	± 3.9%
The Texas Lyceum	Sept 8–21, 2015	Hillary Clinton	27%	Jeb Bush	35%	8	633 LV	± 3.9%
The Texas Lyceum	Sept 8–21, 2015	Hillary Clinton	32%	Ted Cruz	39%	7	633 LV	± 3.9%
The Texas Lyceum	Sept 8–21, 2015	Hillary Clinton	34%	Marco Rubio	27%	7	633 LV	± 3.9%
The Texas Lyceum	Sept 8–21, 2015	Hillary Clinton	31%	Scott Walker	33%	2	633 LV	± 3.9%
The Texas Lyceum	Sept 8–21, 2015	Hillary Clinton	38%	Rick Perry	34%	4	633 LV	± 3.9%
The Texas Lyceum	Sept 8–21, 2015	Hillary Clinton	38%	Donald Trump	33%	5	801 RV	± 3.35%
The Texas Lyceum	Sept 8–21, 2015	Hillary Clinton	27%	Jeb Bush	32%	5	801 RV	± 3.35%
The Texas Lyceum	Sept 8–21, 2015	Hillary Clinton	31%	Ted Cruz	32%	1	801 RV	± 3.35%
The Texas Lyceum	Sept 8–21, 2015	Hillary Clinton	32%	Marco Rubio	22%	10	801 RV	± 3.35%
The Texas Lyceum	Sept 8–21, 2015	Hillary Clinton	31%	Scott Walker	29%	2	801 RV	± 3.35%
The Texas Lyceum	Sept 8–21, 2015	Hillary Clinton	37%	Rick Perry	31%	6	801 RV	± 3.35%
Public Policy Polling	April 10–13, 2014	Hillary Clinton	42%	Jeb Bush	50%	8	559	± 4.1%
Public Policy Polling	April 10–13, 2014	Hillary Clinton	42%	Chris Christie	44%	2	559	± 4.1%
Public Policy Polling	April 10–13, 2014	Hillary Clinton	43%	Ted Cruz	50%	7	559	± 4.1%
Public Policy Polling	April 10–13, 2014	Hillary Clinton	42%	Mike Huckabee	50%	8	559	± 4.1%
Public Policy Polling	April 10–13, 2014	Hillary Clinton	40%	Rand Paul	50%	10	559	± 4.1%
Public Policy Polling	April 10–13, 2014	Hillary Clinton	44%	Rick Perry	49%	5	559	± 4.1%
Public Policy Polling	November 1–4, 2013	Hillary Clinton	42%	Jeb Bush	49%	7	500	± 4.4%
Public Policy Polling	November 1–4, 2013	Hillary Clinton	39%	Chris Christie	44%	5	500	± 4.4%
Public Policy Polling	November 1–4, 2013	Hillary Clinton	45%	Ted Cruz	48%	3	500	± 4.4%
Public Policy Polling	November 1–4, 2013	Hillary Clinton	44%	Rand Paul	48%	4	500	± 4.4%
Public Policy Polling	November 1–4, 2013	Hillary Clinton	47%	Rick Perry	45%	2	500	± 4.4%
Public Policy Polling	June 28 – July 1, 2013	Hillary Clinton	43%	Jeb Bush	46%	3	500	± 4.4%
Public Policy Polling	June 28 – July 1, 2013	Hillary Clinton	38%	Chris Christie	47%	9	500	± 4.4%
Public Policy Polling	June 28 – July 1, 2013	Hillary Clinton	44%	Ted Cruz	49%	5	500	± 4.4%
Public Policy Polling	June 28 – July 1, 2013	Hillary Clinton	48%	Rick Perry	44%	4	500	± 4.4%
Public Policy Polling	January 24–27, 2013	Hillary Clinton	45%	Chris Christie	43%	2	500	±4.4%
Public Policy Polling	January 24–27, 2013	Hillary Clinton	50%	Rick Perry	42%	8	500	±4.4%
Public Policy Polling	January 24–27, 2013	Hillary Clinton	46%	Marco Rubio	45%	1	500	±4.4%

== Utah ==
6 electoral votes
(Republican in 2008) 62%–34%
(Republican in 2012) 73%–25%

Poll source	Date administered	Democrat	%	Republican	%	Lead margin	Sample size	Margin of error
Dan Jones & Associates	December 8–14, 2015	Hillary Clinton	28%	Donald Trump	33%	5	622	± 3.93%
Dan Jones & Associates	December 8–14, 2015	Hillary Clinton	21%	Marco Rubio	48%	27	622	± 3.93%
Dan Jones & Associates	December 8–14, 2015	Hillary Clinton	22%	Jeb Bush	47%	25	622	± 3.93%
Dan Jones & Associates	December 8–14, 2015	Hillary Clinton	23%	Ben Carson	52%	29	622	± 3.93%

== Virginia ==
13 electoral votes
(Democratic in 2008) 53%–46%
(Democratic in 2012) 51%–47%

Poll source	Date administered	Democrat	%	Republican	%	Lead margin	Sample size	Margin of error
Roanoke College	November 9–13, 2015	Hillary Clinton	50%	Donald Trump	36%	14	601	± 4%
Roanoke College	November 9–13, 2015	Hillary Clinton	46%	Jeb Bush	39%	7	601	± 4%
Roanoke College	November 9–13, 2015	Hillary Clinton	46%	Carly Fiorina	39%	7	601	± 4%
Roanoke College	November 9–13, 2015	Hillary Clinton	45%	Marco Rubio	41%	4	601	± 4%
Roanoke College	November 9–13, 2015	Hillary Clinton	44%	Ben Carson	44%	Tied	601	± 4%
Roanoke College	November 9–13, 2015	Hillary Clinton	47%	Ted Cruz	39%	8	601	± 4%
Christopher Newport University	September 29 – October 8, 2015	Hillary Clinton	47%	Donald Trump	40%	7	1,067	± 3.2%
Christopher Newport University	September 29 – October 8, 2015	Hillary Clinton	43%	Ben Carson	49%	6	1,067	± 3.2%
Christopher Newport University	September 29 – October 8, 2015	Hillary Clinton	43%	Carly Fiorina	47%	4	1,067	± 3.2%
Christopher Newport University	September 29 – October 8, 2015	Hillary Clinton	43%	Jeb Bush	46%	3	1,067	± 3.2%
Christopher Newport University	September 29 – October 8, 2015	Hillary Clinton	45%	Marco Rubio	45%	Tied	1,067	± 3.2%
Christopher Newport University	September 29 – October 8, 2015	Hillary Clinton	49%	Ted Cruz	41%	8	1,067	± 3.2%
Christopher Newport University	September 29 – October 8, 2015	Hillary Clinton	42%	Chris Christie	47%	5	1,067	± 3.2%
Christopher Newport University	September 29 – October 8, 2015	Bernie Sanders	49%	Donald Trump	37%	12	1,067	± 3.2%
Christopher Newport University	September 29 – October 8, 2015	Bernie Sanders	39%	Ben Carson	49%	10	1,067	± 3.2%
Christopher Newport University	September 29 – October 8, 2015	Bernie Sanders	39%	Carly Fiorina	44%	5	1,067	± 3.2%
Christopher Newport University	September 29 – October 8, 2015	Bernie Sanders	41%	Jeb Bush	46%	5	1,067	± 3.2%
Christopher Newport University	September 29 – October 8, 2015	Bernie Sanders	43%	Marco Rubio	42%	1	1,067	± 3.2%
Christopher Newport University	September 29 – October 8, 2015	Bernie Sanders	47%	Ted Cruz	37%	10	1,067	± 3.2%
Christopher Newport University	September 29 – October 8, 2015	Bernie Sanders	41%	Chris Christie	44%	3	1,067	± 3.2%
Christopher Newport University	September 29 – October 8, 2015	Joe Biden	54%	Donald Trump	37%	17	1,067	± 3.2%
Christopher Newport University	September 29 – October 8, 2015	Joe Biden	48%	Ben Carson	44%	4	1,067	± 3.2%
Christopher Newport University	September 29 – October 8, 2015	Joe Biden	48%	Carly Fiorina	42%	6	1,067	± 3.2%
Christopher Newport University	September 29 – October 8, 2015	Joe Biden	47%	Jeb Bush	42%	5	1,067	± 3.2%
Christopher Newport University	September 29 – October 8, 2015	Joe Biden	50%	Marco Rubio	40%	10	1,067	± 3.2%
Christopher Newport University	September 29 – October 8, 2015	Joe Biden	53%	Ted Cruz	36%	17	1,067	± 3.2%
Christopher Newport University	September 29 – October 8, 2015	Joe Biden	48%	Chris Christie	41%	7	1,067	± 3.2%
Roanoke College	August 10–20, 2015	Hillary Clinton	43%	Donald Trump	32%	11	535	± 4.24%
Roanoke College	August 10–20, 2015	Hillary Clinton	42%	Jeb Bush	40%	2	535	± 4.24%
Roanoke College	August 10–20, 2015	Hillary Clinton	42%	Scott Walker	38%	4	535	± 4.24%
Roanoke College	August 10–20, 2015	Hillary Clinton	42%	Marco Rubio	40%	2	535	± 4.24%
Quinnipiac University	July 9–20, 2015	Hillary Clinton	39%	Jeb Bush	42%	3	1,209	± 2.8%
Quinnipiac University	July 9–20, 2015	Hillary Clinton	40%	Scott Walker	43%	3	1,209	± 2.8%
Quinnipiac University	July 9–20, 2015	Hillary Clinton	41%	Marco Rubio	43%	2	1,209	± 2.8%
Quinnipiac University	July 9–20, 2015	Joe Biden	40%	Jeb Bush	45%	5	1,209	± 2.8%
Quinnipiac University	July 9–20, 2015	Joe Biden	41%	Scott Walker	45%	4	1,209	± 2.8%
Quinnipiac University	July 9–20, 2015	Joe Biden	41%	Marco Rubio	45%	4	1,209	± 2.8%
Quinnipiac University	July 9–20, 2015	Bernie Sanders	36%	Jeb Bush	46%	10	1,209	± 2.8%
Quinnipiac University	July 9–20, 2015	Bernie Sanders	36%	Scott Walker	44%	8	1,209	± 2.8%
Quinnipiac University	July 9–20, 2015	Bernie Sanders	37%	Marco Rubio	44%	7	1,209	± 2.8%
Public Policy Polling	July 13–15, 2015	Hillary Clinton	46%	Jeb Bush	38%	8	1,170	± 2.9%
Public Policy Polling	July 13–15, 2015	Hillary Clinton	47%	Ben Carson	43%	4	1,170	± 2.9%
Public Policy Polling	July 13–15, 2015	Hillary Clinton	45%	Chris Christie	39%	6	1,170	± 2.9%
Public Policy Polling	July 13–15, 2015	Hillary Clinton	48%	Ted Cruz	41%	7	1,170	± 2.9%
Public Policy Polling	July 13–15, 2015	Hillary Clinton	46%	Carly Fiorina	39%	7	1,170	± 2.9%
Public Policy Polling	July 13–15, 2015	Hillary Clinton	47%	Jim Gilmore	35%	12	1,170	± 2.9%
Public Policy Polling	July 13–15, 2015	Hillary Clinton	49%	Mike Huckabee	39%	10	1,170	± 2.9%
Public Policy Polling	July 13–15, 2015	Hillary Clinton	47%	Rand Paul	42%	5	1,170	± 2.9%
Public Policy Polling	July 13–15, 2015	Hillary Clinton	47%	Marco Rubio	43%	4	1,170	± 2.9%
Public Policy Polling	July 13–15, 2015	Hillary Clinton	49%	Donald Trump	39%	10	1,170	± 2.9%
Public Policy Polling	July 13–15, 2015	Hillary Clinton	47%	Scott Walker	42%	5	1,170	± 2.9%
Public Policy Polling	July 13–15, 2015	Bernie Sanders	39%	Jeb Bush	40%	1	1,170	± 2.9%
Public Policy Polling	July 13–15, 2015	Bernie Sanders	38%	Marco Rubio	40%	2	1,170	± 2.9%
Public Policy Polling	July 13–15, 2015	Bernie Sanders	43%	Donald Trump	39%	4	1,170	± 2.9%
Public Policy Polling	July 13–15, 2015	Bernie Sanders	38%	Scott Walker	39%	1	1,170	± 2.9%
Public Policy Polling	July 13–15, 2015	Jim Webb	40%	Scott Walker	37%	3	1,170	± 2.9%
Christopher Newport University	April 13–24, 2015	Hillary Clinton	46%	Jeb Bush	48%	2	658	± 4.6%
Christopher Newport University	April 13–24, 2015	Hillary Clinton	47%	Chris Christie	45%	2	658	± 4.6%
Christopher Newport University	April 13–24, 2015	Hillary Clinton	49%	Ted Cruz	44%	5	658	± 4.6%
Christopher Newport University	April 13–24, 2015	Hillary Clinton	49%	Mike Huckabee	46%	3	658	± 4.6%
Christopher Newport University	April 13–24, 2015	Hillary Clinton	49%	Rand Paul	47%	2	658	± 4.6%
Christopher Newport University	April 13–24, 2015	Hillary Clinton	49%	Marco Rubio	45%	4	658	± 4.6%
Christopher Newport University	April 13–24, 2015	Hillary Clinton	48%	Scott Walker	43%	5	658	± 4.6%
Quinnipiac University	March 29–April 7, 2015	Hillary Clinton	47%	Jeb Bush	40%	7	961	± 3.2%
Quinnipiac University	March 29–April 7, 2015	Hillary Clinton	46%	Chris Christie	40%	6	961	± 3.2%
Quinnipiac University	March 29–April 7, 2015	Hillary Clinton	49%	Ted Cruz	39%	10	961	± 3.2%
Quinnipiac University	March 29–April 7, 2015	Hillary Clinton	48%	Mike Huckabee	40%	8	961	± 3.2%
Quinnipiac University	March 29–April 7, 2015	Hillary Clinton	47%	Rand Paul	43%	4	961	± 3.2%
Quinnipiac University	March 29–April 7, 2015	Hillary Clinton	48%	Marco Rubio	40%	8	961	± 3.2%
Quinnipiac University	March 29–April 7, 2015	Hillary Clinton	47%	Scott Walker	40%	7	961	± 3.2%
Quinnipiac University	February 5–15, 2015	Hillary Clinton	42%	Jeb Bush	42%	Tied	1,074	± 3%
Quinnipiac University	February 5–15, 2015	Hillary Clinton	44%	Chris Christie	39%	5	1,074	± 3%
Quinnipiac University	February 5–15, 2015	Hillary Clinton	44%	Mike Huckabee	41%	3	1,074	± 3%
Quinnipiac University	February 5–15, 2015	Hillary Clinton	44%	Rand Paul	42%	2	1,074	± 3%
Quinnipiac University	February 5–15, 2015	Hillary Clinton	45%	Scott Walker	40%	5	1,074	± 3%
Christopher Newport University	January 30 – February 10, 2015	Hillary Clinton	48%	Jeb Bush	43%	5	794	± 3.6%
Christopher Newport University	January 30 – February 10, 2015	Hillary Clinton	49%	Chris Christie	42%	7	794	± 3.6%
Christopher Newport University	January 30 – February 10, 2015	Hillary Clinton	52%	Mike Huckabee	42%	10	794	± 3.6%
Christopher Newport University	January 30 – February 10, 2015	Hillary Clinton	52%	Rand Paul	42%	10	794	± 3.6%
Christopher Newport University	January 30 – February 10, 2015	Hillary Clinton	51%	Marco Rubio	42%	9	794	± 3.6%
Christopher Newport University	January 30 – February 10, 2015	Hillary Clinton	52%	Paul Ryan	42%	10	794	± 3.6%
Roanoke College	September 13–19, 2014	Hillary Clinton	47%	Chris Christie	37%	10	630	± 3.9%
Roanoke College	September 13–19, 2014	Hillary Clinton	51%	Rand Paul	35%	16	630	± 3.9%
Roanoke College	September 13–19, 2014	Hillary Clinton	50%	Paul Ryan	37%	13	630	± 3.9%
Roanoke College	July 14–19, 2014	Hillary Clinton	44%	Chris Christie	34%	10	566	± 4.2%
Roanoke College	July 14–19, 2014	Hillary Clinton	47%	Rand Paul	37%	10	566	± 4.2%
Roanoke College	July 14–19, 2014	Hillary Clinton	47%	Paul Ryan	38%	9	566	± 4.2%
Quinnipiac	March 19–24, 2014	Hillary Clinton	47%	Jeb Bush	39%	8	1,288	± 2.7%
Quinnipiac	March 19–24, 2014	Hillary Clinton	45%	Chris Christie	41%	4	1,288	± 2.7%
Quinnipiac	March 19–24, 2014	Hillary Clinton	49%	Mike Huckabee	41%	8	1,288	± 2.7%
Quinnipiac	March 19–24, 2014	Hillary Clinton	48%	Rand Paul	42%	6	1,288	± 2.7%
Roanoke College	February 22–28, 2014	Hillary Clinton	48%	Chris Christie	40%	8	707	± 3.9%
Roanoke College	February 22–28, 2014	Hillary Clinton	52%	Rand Paul	38%	14	707	± 3.9%
Roanoke College	February 22–28, 2014	Hillary Clinton	51%	Paul Ryan	40%	11	707	± 3.9%
Christopher Newport University	February 23–28, 2014	Hillary Clinton	51%	Jeb Bush	38%	13	901	± 3.3%
Christopher Newport University	February 23–28, 2014	Hillary Clinton	43%	Chris Christie	41%	2	901	± 3.3%
Christopher Newport University	February 23–28, 2014	Hillary Clinton	47%	Ted Cruz	37%	10	901	± 3.3%
Christopher Newport University	February 23–28, 2014	Hillary Clinton	52%	Mike Huckabee	37%	15	901	± 3.3%
Christopher Newport University	February 23–28, 2014	Hillary Clinton	47%	Rand Paul	40%	7	901	± 3.3%
Christopher Newport University	February 23–28, 2014	Hillary Clinton	48%	Marco Rubio	40%	8	901	± 3.3%
Christopher Newport University	February 23–28, 2014	Hillary Clinton	52%	Paul Ryan	37%	15	901	± 3.3%
Christopher Newport University	February 23–28, 2014	Hillary Clinton	46%	Scott Walker	35%	11	901	± 3.3%
Harper Polling	September 15–16, 2013	Hillary Clinton	41%	Chris Christie	41%	Tied	779	± 3.51%
Harper Polling	September 15–16, 2013	Hillary Clinton	50%	Rand Paul	41%	7	779	± 3.51%
Harper Polling	September 15–16, 2013	Hillary Clinton	47%	Marco Rubio	40%	7	779	± 3.51%
Purple Strategies	September 6–10, 2013	Hillary Clinton	42%	Chris Christie	40%	2	800	± 3.5%
Purple Strategies	September 6–10, 2013	Hillary Clinton	48%	Rand Paul	41%	7	800	± 3.5%
Quinnipiac	August 14–19, 2013	Hillary Clinton	46%	Chris Christie	37%	9	1,374	± 2.6%
Quinnipiac	August 14–19, 2013	Hillary Clinton	53%	Ted Cruz	34%	17	1,374	± 2.6%
Quinnipiac	August 14–19, 2013	Joe Biden	37%	Chris Christie	44%	7	1,374	± 2.6%
Quinnipiac	August 14–19, 2013	Joe Biden	47%	Ted Cruz	37%	10	1,374	± 2.6%
Quinnipiac	July 11–15, 2013	Hillary Clinton	45%	Chris Christie	40%	5	1,030	±3.1%
Quinnipiac	July 11–15, 2013	Hillary Clinton	51%	Rand Paul	37%	14	1,030	±3.1%
Quinnipiac	July 11–15, 2013	Joe Biden	38%	Chris Christie	46%	8	1,030	±3.1%
Quinnipiac	July 11–15, 2013	Joe Biden	47%	Rand Paul	40%	7	1,030	±3.1%
Public Policy Polling	July 11–14, 2013	Hillary Clinton	42%	Chris Christie	41%	1	601	±4%
Public Policy Polling	July 11–14, 2013	Hillary Clinton	47%	Jeb Bush	42%	5	601	±4%
Public Policy Polling	July 11–14, 2013	Hillary Clinton	49%	Bob McDonnell	39%	10	601	±4%
Public Policy Polling	July 11–14, 2013	Hillary Clinton	51%	Rand Paul	39%	12	601	±4%
Public Policy Polling	July 11–14, 2013	Hillary Clinton	49%	Marco Rubio	37%	12	601	±4%
Public Policy Polling	May 24–26, 2013	Hillary Clinton	48%	Bob McDonnell	42%	6	672	± 3.8%
Public Policy Polling	May 24–26, 2013	Hillary Clinton	46%	Marco Rubio	42%	4	672	± 3.8%
Quinnipiac	May 8–13, 2013	Hillary Clinton	51%	Marco Rubio	38%	13	1,286	±2.7%
Quinnipiac	May 8–13, 2013	Hillary Clinton	50%	Paul Ryan	40%	10	1,286	±2.7%
Quinnipiac	May 8–13, 2013	Mark Warner	51%	Marco Rubio	33%	18	1,286	±2.7%
Quinnipiac	May 8–13, 2013	Mark Warner	50%	Paul Ryan	37%	13	1,286	±2.7%
NBC News/Marist	April 28 – May 2, 2012	Hillary Clinton	52%	Bob McDonnell	41%	11	1,095	±3%
NBC News/Marist	April 28 – May 2, 2012	Joe Biden	42%	Bob McDonnell	49%	7	1,095	±3%
Public Policy Polling	April 26–29, 2012	Mark Warner	50%	Bob McDonnell	37%	13	680	±3.8%

Three-way race

Poll Source	Date administered	Democrat	%	Republican	%	Independent/ Third-party candidate	%	Lead margin	Sample size	Margin of error
University of Mary Washington	November 4–9, 2015	Hillary Clinton	42%	Donald Trump	36%	Jim Webb	16%	6	1,006	±3.5%
University of Mary Washington	November 4–9, 2015	Hillary Clinton	39%	Ben Carson	44%	Jim Webb	12%	5	1,006	±3.5%
University of Mary Washington	November 4–9, 2015	Bernie Sanders	33%	Donald Trump	38%	Jim Webb	20%	5	1,006	±3.5%
University of Mary Washington	November 4–9, 2015	Bernie Sanders	33%	Ben Carson	42%	Jim Webb	17%	9	1,006	±3.5%
University of Mary Washington	November 4–9, 2015	Hillary Clinton	42%	Jeb Bush	24%	Donald Trump	27%	15	1,006	±3.5%

== Washington ==
12 electoral votes
(Democratic in 2008) 57%–40%
(Democratic in 2012) 56%–41%

Poll source	Date administered	Democrat	%	Republican	%	Lead margin	Sample size	Margin of error
Gravis Marketing	May 18–19, 2015	Hillary Clinton	45%	Jeb Bush	37%	8	1,032	±3%
Gravis Marketing	May 18–19, 2015	Hillary Clinton	47%	Rand Paul	42%	5	1,032	±3%
Gravis Marketing	May 18–19, 2015	Hillary Clinton	46%	Scott Walker	40%	6	1,032	±3%
Gravis Marketing	May 18–19, 2015	Hillary Clinton	46%	Chris Christie	37%	9	1,032	±3%
Gravis Marketing	May 18–19, 2015	Hillary Clinton	47%	Mike Huckabee	40%	7	1,032	±3%
Gravis Marketing	May 18–19, 2015	Hillary Clinton	45%	Marco Rubio	42%	3	1,032	±3%
Gravis Marketing	May 18–19, 2015	Hillary Clinton	48%	Ted Cruz	40%	8	1,032	±3%
Public Policy Polling	May 14–17, 2015	Hillary Clinton	48%	Jeb Bush	37%	11	879	±3.3%
Public Policy Polling	May 14–17, 2015	Hillary Clinton	49%	Ben Carson	39%	10	879	±3.3%
Public Policy Polling	May 14–17, 2015	Hillary Clinton	49%	Chris Christie	34%	15	879	±3.3%
Public Policy Polling	May 14–17, 2015	Hillary Clinton	50%	Ted Cruz	38%	12	879	±3.3%
Public Policy Polling	May 14–17, 2015	Hillary Clinton	50%	Mike Huckabee	37%	10	879	±3.3%
Public Policy Polling	May 14–17, 2015	Hillary Clinton	50%	Rand Paul	38%	12	879	±3.3%
Public Policy Polling	May 14–17, 2015	Hillary Clinton	50%	Rick Perry	37%	13	879	±3.3%
Public Policy Polling	May 14–17, 2015	Hillary Clinton	49%	Marco Rubio	39%	10	879	±3.3%
Public Policy Polling	May 14–17, 2015	Hillary Clinton	49%	Scott Walker	38%	10	879	±3.3%
Public Policy Polling	May 14–17, 2015	Lincoln Chafee	29%	Scott Walker	35%	6	879	±3.3%
Public Policy Polling	May 14–17, 2015	Martin O'Malley	31%	Scott Walker	34%	3	879	±3.3%
Public Policy Polling	May 14–17, 2015	Bernie Sanders	35%	Scott Walker	35%	Tied	879	±3.3%
Public Policy Polling	May 14–17, 2015	Jim Webb	32%	Scott Walker	33%	1	879	±3.3%

== West Virginia ==
5 electoral votes
(Republican in 2008) 56%–43%
(Republican in 2012) 62%–36%

Poll source	Date administered	Democrat	%	Republican	%	Lead margin	Sample size	Margin of error
Orion Strategies	August 24–25, 2015	Hillary Clinton	30%	Donald Trump	53%	23	406	±4.9%
Public Policy Polling	September 19–22, 2013	Hillary Clinton	38%	Jeb Bush	52%	14	1,110	±2.9%
Public Policy Polling	September 19–22, 2013	Hillary Clinton	38%	Chris Christie	47%	9	1,110	±2.9%
Public Policy Polling	September 19–22, 2013	Hillary Clinton	41%	Ted Cruz	44%	3	1,110	±2.9%
Public Policy Polling	September 19–22, 2013	Hillary Clinton	39%	Rand Paul	49%	10	1,110	±2.9%
Public Policy Polling	September 19–22, 2013	Hillary Clinton	38%	Paul Ryan	50%	12	1,110	±2.9%

== Wisconsin ==
10 electoral votes
(Democratic in 2008) 56%–42%
(Democratic in 2012) 53%–46%

Poll source	Date administered	Democrat	%	Republican	%	Lead margin	Sample size	Margin of error
Let America Work	November 16–18, 2015	Hillary Clinton	42%	Marco Rubio	47%	5	900	± 3.3%
Marquette University	November 12–15, 2015	Hillary Clinton	44%	Ben Carson	45%	1	803	± 4.2%
Marquette University	November 12–15, 2015	Hillary Clinton	44%	Marco Rubio	45%	1	803	± 4.2%
Marquette University	November 12–15, 2015	Hillary Clinton	48%	Donald Trump	38%	10	803	± 4.2%
Marquette University	November 12–15, 2015	Bernie Sanders	47%	Ben Carson	41%	6	803	± 4.2%
Marquette University	November 12–15, 2015	Bernie Sanders	46%	Marco Rubio	42%	4	803	± 4.2%
Marquette University	November 12–15, 2015	Bernie Sanders	52%	Donald Trump	35%	17	803	± 4.2%
Marquette University	September 24–28, 2015	Hillary Clinton	50%	Jeb Bush	38%	12	803	± 4.1%
Marquette University	September 24–28, 2015	Hillary Clinton	48%	Marco Rubio	40%	8	803	± 4.1%
Marquette University	September 24–28, 2015	Hillary Clinton	50%	Donald Trump	36%	14	803	± 4.1%
Marquette University	September 24–28, 2015	Bernie Sanders	49%	Jeb Bush	39%	10	803	± 4.1%
Marquette University	September 24–28, 2015	Bernie Sanders	49%	Marco Rubio	36%	13	803	± 4.1%
Marquette University	September 24–28, 2015	Bernie Sanders	53%	Donald Trump	34%	19	803	± 4.1%
Marquette University	August 13–16, 2015	Hillary Clinton	47%	Jeb Bush	42%	5	802	± 3.5%
Marquette University	August 13–16, 2015	Hillary Clinton	50%	Ted Cruz	38%	12	802	± 3.5%
Marquette University	August 13–16, 2015	Hillary Clinton	51%	Donald Trump	35%	16	802	± 3.5%
Marquette University	August 13–16, 2015	Hillary Clinton	52%	Scott Walker	42%	10	802	± 3.5%
The Wisconsin Survey	April 8–17, 2015	Hillary Clinton	44%	Scott Walker	42%	2	600	± 4%
Marquette University	April 7–10, 2015	Hillary Clinton	48.8%	Jeb Bush	37.9%	10.9	803	± 3.5%
Marquette University	April 7–10, 2015	Hillary Clinton	52.1%	Ted Cruz	36.4%	15.7	803	± 3.5%
Marquette University	April 7–10, 2015	Hillary Clinton	49%	Rand Paul	41%	8	803	± 3.5%
Marquette University	April 7–10, 2015	Hillary Clinton	49.5%	Marco Rubio	37.7%	11.8	803	± 3.5%
Marquette University	April 7–10, 2015	Hillary Clinton	51.5%	Scott Walker	39.8%	11.7	803	± 3.5%
Public Policy Polling	March 6–8, 2015	Hillary Clinton	49%	Jeb Bush	39%	10	1,071	± 3%
Public Policy Polling	March 6–8, 2015	Hillary Clinton	49%	Ben Carson	38%	11	1,071	± 3%
Public Policy Polling	March 6–8, 2015	Hillary Clinton	48%	Chris Christie	39%	9	1,071	± 3%
Public Policy Polling	March 6–8, 2015	Hillary Clinton	49%	Ted Cruz	39%	10	1,071	± 3%
Public Policy Polling	March 6–8, 2015	Hillary Clinton	47%	Mike Huckabee	40%	7	1,071	± 3%
Public Policy Polling	March 6–8, 2015	Hillary Clinton	48%	Rand Paul	42%	6	1,071	± 3%
Public Policy Polling	March 6–8, 2015	Hillary Clinton	48%	Rick Perry	40%	8	1,071	± 3%
Public Policy Polling	March 6–8, 2015	Hillary Clinton	48%	Marco Rubio	40%	8	1,071	± 3%
Public Policy Polling	March 6–8, 2015	Hillary Clinton	52%	Scott Walker	43%	9	1,071	± 3%
Public Policy Polling	March 6–8, 2015	Joe Biden	48%	Scott Walker	45%	3	1,071	± 3%
Public Policy Polling	March 6–8, 2015	Elizabeth Warren	48%	Scott Walker	45%	3	1,071	± 3%
Gravis Marketing	October 3–4, 2014	Hillary Clinton	44%	Paul Ryan	51%	7	837	± 3%
Gravis Marketing	September 22–23, 2014	Hillary Clinton	47%	Paul Ryan	46%	1	908	± 3%
Gravis Marketing	July 31 – August 2, 2014	Hillary Clinton	47%	Paul Ryan	48%	1	1,346	± 3%
Public Policy Polling	April 17–20, 2014	Hillary Clinton	50%	Jeb Bush	39%	11	1,144	± 2.9%
Public Policy Polling	April 17–20, 2014	Hillary Clinton	49%	Chris Christie	36%	13	1,144	± 2.9%
Public Policy Polling	April 17–20, 2014	Hillary Clinton	50%	Mike Huckabee	38%	12	1,144	± 2.9%
Public Policy Polling	April 17–20, 2014	Hillary Clinton	50%	Rand Paul	39%	11	1,144	± 2.9%
Public Policy Polling	April 17–20, 2014	Hillary Clinton	50%	Paul Ryan	45%	5	1,144	± 2.9%
Public Policy Polling	April 17–20, 2014	Hillary Clinton	51%	Scott Walker	44%	7	1,144	± 2.9%
Marquette University	October 21–24, 2013	Hillary Clinton	50%	Chris Christie	40.3%	9.7	800	± 3.5%
Marquette University	October 21–24, 2013	Hillary Clinton	55.3%	Ted Cruz	33.4%	21.9	800	± 3.5%
Marquette University	October 21–24, 2013	Hillary Clinton	50.7%	Paul Ryan	43%	7.7	800	± 3.5%
Marquette University	October 21–24, 2013	Hillary Clinton	53.3%	Scott Walker	40.6%	12.7	800	± 3.5%
Public Policy Polling	September 13–16, 2013	Hillary Clinton	46%	Jeb Bush	42%	4	1,180	±2.9%
Public Policy Polling	September 13–16, 2013	Hillary Clinton	43%	Chris Christie	40%	3	1,180	±2.9%
Public Policy Polling	September 13–16, 2013	Hillary Clinton	48%	Ted Cruz	37%	11	1,180	±2.9%
Public Policy Polling	September 13–16, 2013	Hillary Clinton	47%	Rand Paul	42%	5	1,180	±2.9%
Public Policy Polling	September 13–16, 2013	Hillary Clinton	46%	Paul Ryan	46%	Tied	1,180	±2.9%
Public Policy Polling	September 13–16, 2013	Hillary Clinton	49%	Scott Walker	44%	5	1,180	±2.9%
Marquette University	May 6–9, 2013	Hillary Clinton	46.5%	Chris Christie	40%	6.5	717	±3.7%
Marquette University	May 6–9, 2013	Hillary Clinton	50.8%	Rand Paul	37.2%	13.6	717	±3.7%
Marquette University	May 6–9, 2013	Hillary Clinton	51.1%	Marco Rubio	34.9%	16.2	717	±3.7%
Marquette University	May 6–9, 2013	Hillary Clinton	48.5%	Paul Ryan	43.5%	5	717	±3.7%
Marquette University	May 6–9, 2013	Hillary Clinton	50.2%	Scott Walker	41.7%	8.5	717	±3.7%
Public Policy Polling	February 21–24, 2013	Hillary Clinton	52%	Marco Rubio	38%	14	1,799	±2.3%
Public Policy Polling	February 21–24, 2013	Hillary Clinton	51%	Paul Ryan	43%	8	1,799	±2.3%
Public Policy Polling	February 21–24, 2013	Hillary Clinton	54%	Scott Walker	41%	13	1,799	±2.3%

== Wyoming ==
3 electoral votes
(Republican in 2008) 65%–33%
(Republican in 2012) 69%–28%

Poll source	Date administered	Democrat	%	Republican	%	Lead margin	Sample size	Margin of error
Public Policy Polling	July 19–21, 2013	Hillary Clinton	31%	Jeb Bush	58%	27	1,203	±2.8%
Public Policy Polling	July 19–21, 2013	Hillary Clinton	28%	Chris Christie	56%	28	1,203	±2.8%
Public Policy Polling	July 19–21, 2013	Hillary Clinton	32%	Rand Paul	58%	26	1,203	±2.8%
Public Policy Polling	July 19–21, 2013	Hillary Clinton	32%	Marco Rubio	56%	24	1,203	±2.8%
Public Policy Polling	July 19–21, 2013	Hillary Clinton	32%	Paul Ryan	59%	27	1,203	±2.8%

== See also ==
- Statewide opinion polling for the 2016 United States presidential election
