= South Philadelphia High School =

Location
- 2101 South Broad Street; Philadelphia, Pennsylvania 19146; United States; 39.9236°N 75.1684°W

Information
- Former name: Southern Manual Training High School for Boys
- Type: Public secondary
- Established: 1907
- School district: The School District of Philadelphia
- Principal: Kimlime Chek-Taylor
- Teaching staff: 51.58 (FTE)
- Grades: 9–12
- Enrollment: 684 (2024–2025)
- Student to teacher ratio: 13.26
- Colors: Red and Black
- Mascot: Ram
- Website: https://sphs.philasd.org/
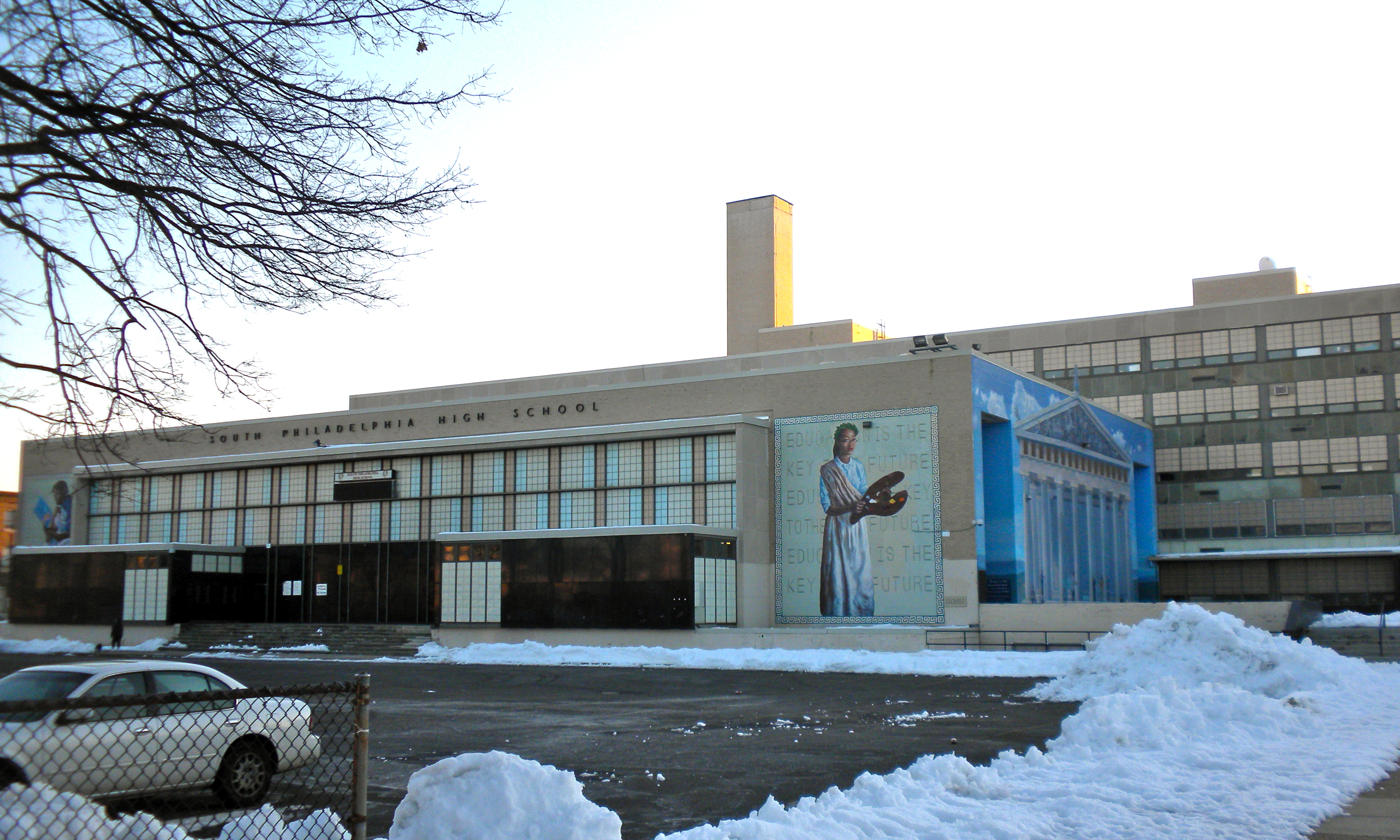
- South Philadelphia High School from Broad Street, February 2010

South Philadelphia High School is a public secondary high school located in the Lower Moyamensing neighborhood of South Philadelphia, at the intersection of Broad Street and Snyder Avenue.

The school serves grades 9 through 12 and is part of the School District of Philadelphia.

The school serves portions of South Philadelphia (including Southwark), and it previously served the Rittenhouse Square and Logan Square sections of Center City.

== History ==
Originally built in 1907 as the Southern Manual Training High School for boys. The Philadelphia School District administrators opened the School merely as a three-year training facility for immigrant children, mostly Jewish and Italian, and children who lacked intellectual skills who "could only work with their hands". But Israel Goldstein, a student and the first alumni scholarship winner in 1911, showed school administrators that there was more promise for academics. He graduated the school at age 14 and then graduated the University of Pennsylvania at the age of 17. Goldstein became a rabbi, an author, a spiritual leader, and founder of Brandeis University in Waltham. Massachusetts. He became a leader of the Zionist movement in America and founder of the National Conference of Christians and Jews. Due in part to young Israel Goldstein as an example of student possibilities, the 3-year training facility became a full four-year co-ed high school.

In the late 1960s, the student population of the high school changed from predominantly poor Jewish and Italian immigrant and first-generation children to increasing low-middle income African-American and immigrant Asian-American children. The number of student enrollment from 1960 to 2009 declined from over 1,000 to less than 500 students. There had always been a significant Black presence at South Philadelphia High School. In the 1960s, each fall and spring, fights broke out between larger groups of Italian-Americans and smaller groups of African-American students, which either led to or were initiated by neighborhood violence which included students from Bishop Neumann Catholic High School. Stabbings, shootings, and even homicides were connected to this violence. The school is effectively surrounded by an Italian-American community.

In the 2000s the school had an Asian American population that made up around 20% of the school and an African-American population of 65–70%, The Asian American population consisted of new immigrants along with an earlier Vietnamese-American and Cambodian-American refugee population that had arrived in the 1980s and 1990s. Tammy Kim of Hyphen said "the school, despite its otherwise nefarious reputation, has become well known for its English as a second language program.". White students now make up 6% of the student body. While vibrant Italian-American and Irish-American communities remain vital components of the new multicultural South Philadelphia, these groups now compose 19.6% and 10.4% in zip codes of 19145 through 19148.

In December 2009, Asian students accused the school district of mishandling racial attacks that targeted Asian students. On December 4, 2009, 26 Asian students were attacked by a group of mostly African American students. Thirteen were hospitalized for their injuries. Officials involved in resolving the incident, including Superintendent Arlene Ackerman and retired U.S. District Court Judge James T. Giles, were accused of indifference to the violence suffered by Asian students, mishandling key evidence and eyewitness accounts in recent related attacks, and falsely accusing and punishing Asians for inciting the attacks. Their actions prompted national outrage and boycotts from Asian organizations.

Bok Technical High School was scheduled to merge with South Philadelphia High in 2013.

In 2015 Kevin McCorry of WHYY-FM stated that the atmosphere of the school was more racially integrated and less tense.

=== Professional boxing shows ===
The school was the site of three professional boxing shows in 2009, including one starring Gabriel Rosado in which Carol Polis, considered to be the first woman judge in the sport's history, judged.

== Transportation ==
SEPTA serves the school with Routes 2, 4, 37, 79, and the Broad Street Line. Students living at least 1.5 miles (2.4 km) away are given a free SEPTA transit pass which is issued every week in order to get to school.

== Feeder patterns ==
Feeder K-8 schools include:

- F. Amadee Bregy School
- George W. Childs School
- D. Newlin Fell School
- Delaplaine McDaniel School
- Southwark School
- Edwin M. Stanton School

Feeder elementary schools include Abram Jenks (which first feeds into Fell), and Francis Scott Key (which first feeds into Southwark school).

In previous eras Albert M. Greenfield School (K-8) in Rittenhouse Square fed into South Philly High. Previously feeder middle schools included Norris S. Barratt Middle School.

== Demographics ==
As of 2010, about 1,000 students attend the school. 70% were black, 18% were Asian, and about 11% were non-Hispanic White or Hispanic. As of 2010 the second floor housed immigrant students. An update: during the school year 2014–2015, the school district successfully integrated the immigrant students with the general student body while maintaining the Bilingual Newcomer (including an Asian American Studies) supports.The immigrant students are no longer separated/segregated on the second floor.

== Academics ==
By September 1998 the school established a bilingual English-Chinese program to serve Chinese immigrant students, and that month it began hiring teachers fluent in both languages to teach core subjects.

== Architecture ==
The original school building was constructed 1907 in a Norman Romanesque style designed by Board of Education Architect Lloyd Titus. The main building had an exterior grey stone façade, with two additions added.

Student capacity was three hundred fifty boy students. It expanded in 1914 for more boy students and a duplicate structure built for a new Girls' School with a passage connecting the two buildings that was referred to as "The Tunnel". In 1941 an open field located seven blocks south at 10th and Bigler streets was purchased by a student fund raising and added to the school property as an athletic field to enhance the athletic program. The field was completely renovated in 2008 by the School District of Philadelphia as a supercomplex for larger District-wide events. The original School of 1907 was demolished in 1955.

A new rectangular-shaped building was constructed and opened in 1956 on half of the site. The single building was built as a co-ed facility. The frontage included a new grand sized patio plaza entrance, large asphalted school yard and significant green space enclosed with a regal looking four foot black iron railing tipped in gold painted points. The modern architecture style utilized interior walls of cinder block, cement flooring and staircases, with a facade of light colored tan brick and large galvanized steel metal framed classroom windows. It contained four stories of 190 classrooms with modern infrastructure, a large gymnasium, auditorium and lunchroom with 1,500 seats.

In 2013 South Philadelphia High School in partnership with the Lower Moyamensing Civic Association gathered resources for a new sustainable master plan on urban crowdsourcing platform Projexity. The master plan anticipates the creation of rooftop agriculture, outdoor classrooms, porous pavement, solar panels, and many more improvements.

In 2018, in partnership with the Mural Arts Program, Artist Ben Volta worked with students and the local community to create the mural that covers the front walls of the school. Called Parts Per Million, it refers to the way that carbon dioxide is measured in the atmosphere, using it as a metaphor for change through collective action.

== Student organizations ==
After an incident occurred in October 2008 when 30 black students chased and attacked five Asian students, a Chinese student named Wei Chen (simplified Chinese: 陈 威; traditional Chinese: 陳 威; pinyin: Chén Wēi), who originated from Fujian Province, founded the Chinese-American Student Association in order to help orient new immigrants into the school and to keep records of assaults against Chinese students. Chen later organized protests after a 2009 attack on Asian students.

== Notable alumni ==
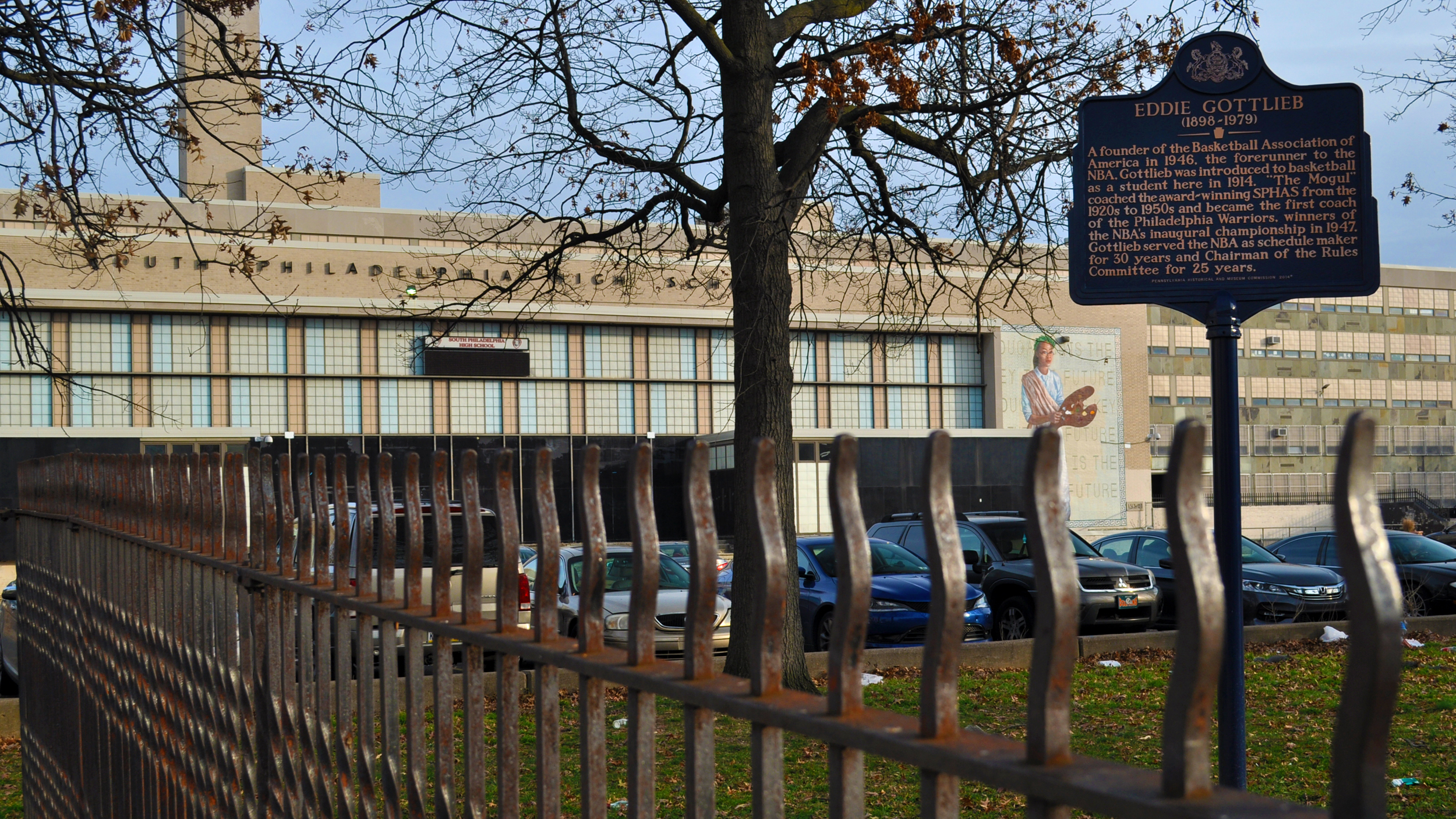
Historical marker for alumnus Eddie Gottlieb, a seven-time ABL-winning basketball coach

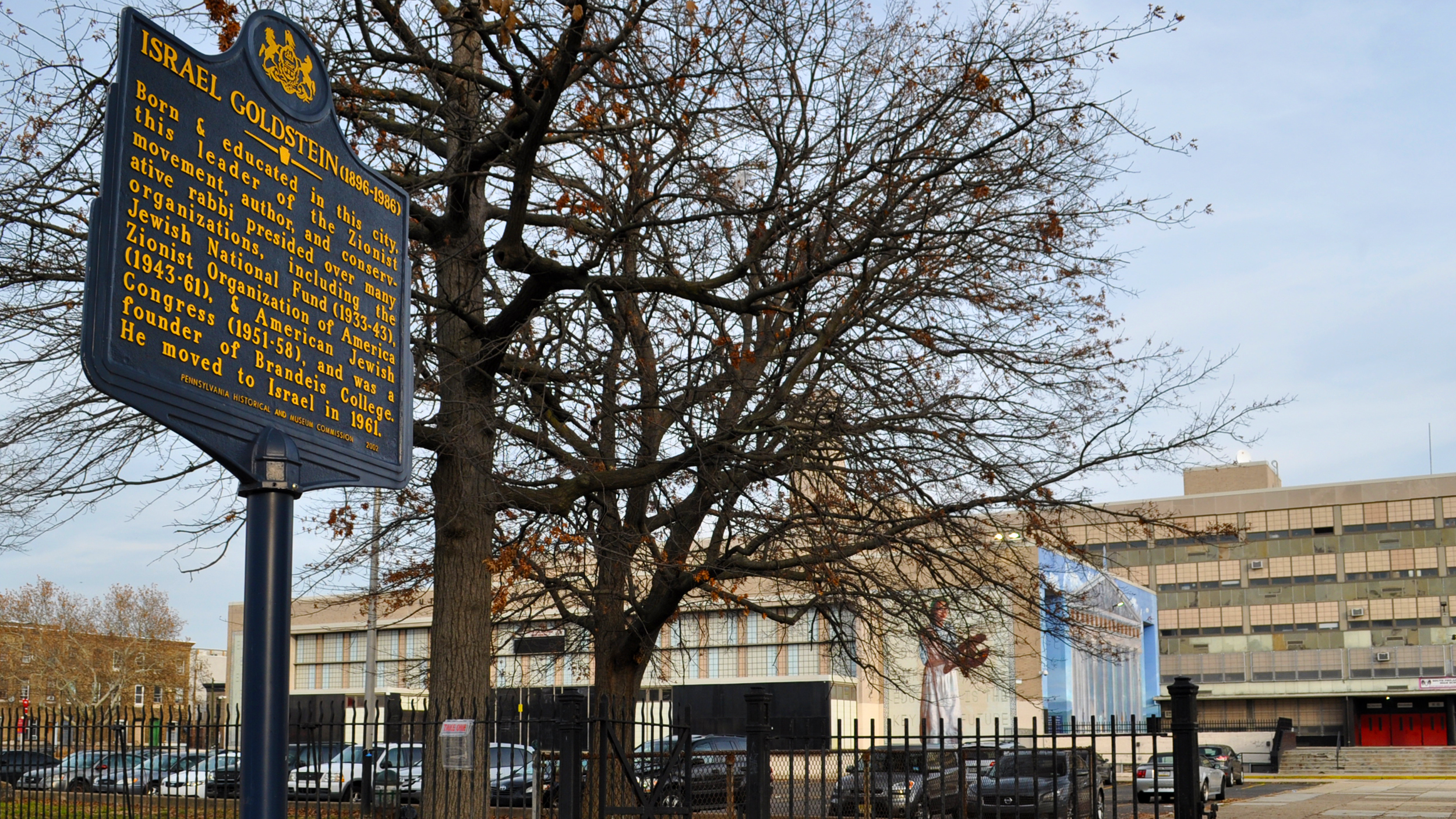
Historical marker for alumnus Israel Goldstein, a Zionist leader and founder of Brandeis University

- Al Alberts (1946), (1946) singer and composer
- Marian Anderson (1919), (1919) opera and spiritual singer, graduated from
- Nate Blackwell (1983), former professional basketball player, San Antonio Spurs
- Louis Bordo (1939), Olympic gymnast
- Al Brancato (1939), former professional baseball player, Philadelphia Athletics
- Stan Brown (1947), former professional basketball player, Philadelphia Sphas and Philadelphia Warriors
- Chubby Checker (1958), singer and songwriter, popularized the Twist dance craze of late 1950s and early 1960s
- Angelo DiGeorge (1939), Renowned pediatric endocrinologist
- Fred Diodati (1950), Lead singer of The Four Aces
- Eddie Feinberg, former professional baseball player, Philadelphia Phillies
- Lois Fernandez African-rights activist and founder of the Odunde Festival.
- Louis Fischer (1914), Journalist.
- Eddie Fisher, Popular 1950s singer.
- Frank Forbes (1910), Baseball player, founder of the Negro National League.
- Frank Gasparro (1927), Chief Engraver of the United States Mint.
- Harry Gold (1929), Atomic spy
- Israel Goldstein (1911), Rabbi, author and Zionist leader, founder of Brandeis University.
- Harry Gorodetzer, cellist for the Philadelphia Orchestra for 50 seasons
- Edward Gottlieb (1916), NBA team coach, manager and owner.
- Charlie Gracie (1954), Rock pioneer and singer
- Frank Guarrera (1942), Opera singer
- Rodney Harvey (did not graduate), actor (The Outsiders, My Own Private Idaho).
- Edward Heffron attended So Philly High, WW 2 Easy Co 506th, 101st Airborne, Band of Brothers HBO mini series
- Harry E. Kalodner (1912), United States federal judge
- Red Klotz (1940), NBA basketball player and coach.
- Irving S. Kosloff (1930), NBA team owner.
- Samuel Noah Kramer (1915), Assyriologist and Sumerian historian.
- Mario Lanza (1940) Opera singer, actor
- Joseph Anthony "Uncle Joe" Ligambi, retired boss of the Philadelphia crime family
- John Liney, American cartoonist
- Harry Litwack (1925), College men's basketball coach
- Walter Lively (1949), activist & Black Liberationist.
- Howard Hamilton Mackey (1901–1987), American architect, educator; class of 1920
- Hal Marnie (1937), Major League Baseball player
- John Mercanti (1962), Chief Engraver of the United States Mint
- Robert K. Merton, sociologist
- Vincent Persichetti (1933), Composer, pianist and teacher at the Juilliard School
- Carmen Piccone (1947), Head football coach for the Southern Illinois Salukis
- Peter Mark Richman (1945), Film and on television actor
- Amber Rose (2001), model
- Petey Rosenberg (1937), Basketball Association of America(BAA) player
- John Sandusky (1945), National Football League player (Cleveland Browns, Green Bay Packers) and coach (Baltimore Colts, Philadelphia Eagles, Miami Dolphins)
- Lionel Simmons (1986), NBA player
- Joe Scarpa (1965), Notorious Cheapskate (World Wide Wrestling Federation as "Chief Jay Strongbow").
- Joseph Stefano (1940), Screenwriter (Psycho, Outer Limits)
- H. Patrick Swygert, 1960, University president (University at Albany, SUNY, Howard University), executive vice president (Temple University) and professor (Temple University Beasley School of Law)
- Martin Weinberg 1955, Senior research sociologist at The Kinsey Institute and university professor (Northwestern University, Rutgers University).
- Stanley Weintraub, 1946, Professor, historian, and biographer

== See also ==
- South Philadelphia
