= Lois Fernandez =

American activist (1936–2017)

- Born: 1936; Philadelphia, Pennsylvania
- Died: August 13, 2017 (aged 80–81); Philadelphia, Pennsylvania
- Movement: Odunde Festival

Lois Fernandez (1936 – August 13, 2017) was a political and cultural activist, best known for founding the Odunde Festival in Philadelphia, Pennsylvania. The festival celebrates African and African-American heritage. It has continued for more than forty years, expanding from one block long to a dozen, and drawing as many as 500,000 people to South Philadelphia.

Fernandez' contributions were publicly applauded in the 2000 Congressional record: proceedings and debates of the Congress by the Hon. Robert A. Brady. She was publicly recognized during Women's History Month, March 2009, by the General Assembly of Pennsylvania. Her memoir Recollections (part one) was published in 2016.

== Life ==
Lois Fernandez was one of 10 children. Her mother was the first black woman to serve as a Democratic party committeewoman in Philadelphia. Her family was high Episcopalian. Lois attended South Philadelphia High School for Girls.

Her first paying job was as a clerk typist at the Philadelphia Quartermaster Depot. The Black Power movement was becoming influential, and Fernandez was an active worker for civil rights and social justice. One outward indicator of her pride in being African was that she cut her hair and let it grow out naturally in an Afro. It was a radical choice at that time, causing her to be ostracized by some of her co-workers.

Fernandez lived in the South Street area of Philadelphia, one of the oldest communities of free African-Americans in the United States, dating back to the 17th century. W. E. B. Du Bois described the area of the Seventh Ward in his ground-breaking sociological work, The Philadelphia Negro (1890), recognizing its distinct black identity. In 1963, Fernandez bought her own house on Fernon Street.

In 1966, Lois Fernandez, her sister Sylvia Green, her cousin Gerri Fernandez, and her friend Ruth Arthur opened a boutique, the Uhuru Hut, at 500 South 23rd Street. They felt that a store focused on Afrocentric clothes, jewelry and fine art would complement consciousness raising and increased black cultural awareness. At the same time, she and Ruth Arthur began to think about possibilities for some sort of neighborhood gathering in the area.

In 1967, Lois Fernandez bore a son as a single mother. She brought forward a lawsuit in federal court and was ultimately successful in having the designation “illegitimate” removed from Pennsylvania birth certificates.

By the 1970s, Fernandez was employed by the Department of Public Welfare. She worked with street gangs in South Philadelphia to decrease violence in the community. Throughout her career she held various positions with the Philadelphia Department of Human Services, including social worker, foster care placement officer, gang prevention worker and parent counselor.

She believed in lifelong learning, and earned an associate degree in applied science from the Community College of Philadelphia, and a master's in urban education from Antioch University. She also earned parent education certification at St. Louis University, certification for AIDS training from the AIDS Activities Coordinating Office, and certification in arts management from the University of Massachusetts. She became an adjunct faculty member at Lincoln University in their master's degree program in human services.

In the 1990s, she noticed the need for senior housing in her neighborhood. She worked with city and state officials and developers to rally support and raise funding. Osun Village, a four-story complex for low-income seniors, opened in South Philadelphia on December 13, 2010. Anna C. Verna, president of the City Council credited Fernandez, stating "This would never, never have become reality without the constant, constant persistence of Lois Fernandez."

Fernandez struggled with ill health during her life. She suffered from rheumatic fever as a child. Later in life she fought rheumatoid arthritis and breast cancer. After hip and knee replacements she had to use a motorized scooter for mobility.

== Forming Odunde ==
External videos
- “Odunde 1995”, Arthur Hall Collection Videos

Fernandez had met Nigerian practitioners of the Yoruba religion as early as 1963. In January 1972, Fernandez traveled to Oshogbo, Nigeria, West Africa, where she was inspired by the Oshun Festival of the Yoruba people. She visited the Osun River with Nigerian artist Twins Seven-Seven as part of a local celebration honoring Oshun, and thought that something similar could be done with Philadelphia's rivers.

After returning to Philadelphia, Fernandez and her friend Ruth Arthur organized the first Odunde Festival. It took place in April 1975, as the "Oshun Festival". Their goal was to bring together the community and to foster awareness of and pride in black history and culture. The first procession started from Fernandez's house on Madison Square. The officiant was Obailumi Ogunsey, a Yoruba priest who Fernandez had met in 1963. Fernandez invited choreographer Arthur L. Hall and his dance troupe to participate.

Fernandez' idea for a community procession was initially met with expressions of disbelief. Some members of the black community were incredulous at the idea that the city would give a black parade permission to stop traffic. "Ain't gonna let nobody go across that bridge, shut off that bridge and let y'all walk to the river." Others were afraid of gang violence, but the actual event was both successful and peaceful.

"They came out and looked at us coming up their streets because we had the drummers. We were making noise... It wasn't a big crowd. I don't know, maybe it was, like total maybe 50 of us. But there we come in their neighborhood with our drums, with our African clothing on, singing. ..." Lois Fernandez

In 1975, their first year, they received $100 from the Philadelphia's Southwest Center City Community Council and raised some neighborhood donations. The second year, they were awarded a $5,000 grant by Councilman John Anderson. From then on, the festival expanded rapidly.

By Odunde's second decade, there was some opposition from people who found it too large and too loud. Fernandez strenuously and successfully opposed attempts to move the Odunde Festival from its original location. She emphasized the importance of keeping it in its neighborhood, close to its cultural roots. Its closest analog in the city was the Mummer's Parade which had formed out of white ethnic neighborhoods in the Seventh Ward around 1900. The local tradition of public parades also included Improved Benevolent and Protective Order of Elks of the World Lodge parades, and Catholic saint's parades. Fernandez identified gentrification as an impetus behind attempts to move the festival, and pointed out the racism of responding differently to white and black-based traditions. By creating Odunde and repeatedly emphasizing its place in a continuum of African-American history on South Street, Fernandez played an important role in the reappropriation of South Street and its signification as an important black cultural space. The Odunde Festival has provided an important source of visible continuity in the African and African-American community.

"The story of ODUNDE is part of a larger struggle for cultural resistance and survival that is in many ways the narrative of our time." Lois Fernandez, 1996

In 1983, South Philadelphia-based ODUNDE Inc. was formed to support local cultural activity. The name ODUNDE comes from a Yoruba language word meaning “Happy New Year”. Fernandez served for many years as president of ODUNDE Inc., while her daughter, Oshunbumi Fernandez served as executive director. During this time, Fernandez and ODUNDE worked with the Philadelphia Folklore Project to document and preserve African American art and culture from South Philadelphia.

"We believe that it is critical that we record the perspectives and wisdom of the activists and artists who have in different ways fought to preserve and sustain African American culture in the face of enormous obstacles and often at great cost."

In 1996, Lois Fernandez turned over the work of building an African-American cultural movement to her daughter Oshunbumi Fernandez. Oshunbumi Fernandez was a year old when her mother led the first ODUNDE festival.

== ODUNDE traditions ==
Held on the second Sunday in June, the celebration is now the largest African celebration on the east coast of the United States, and one of the "largest and longest-running African American street festivals" in the United States.

It begins with a procession, usually starting from Twenty-Third and South Streets, over the South Street Bridge to the Schuylkill. There fruit, flowers, honey and other offerings are thrown into the river to honor the Yoruba river orisha Oshun. Participants tend to wear white or dress in traditional African clothing. They are accompanied by drummers, dancers, and vendors. After ceremonies at the river, the procession returns to a festival area, reminiscent of a Nigerian market, for music and other entertainment. Entertainers often perform at both South Street and Grays Ferry Avenue, and have included international artists such as drummer Babatunde Olatunji.

== Autobiography ==
Lois Fernandez worked with folklorist Debora Kodish to publish a memoir of her early life in South Philadelphia in the 1930s, 1940s and 1950s: Recollections (part one) (2016). It was released in 2016 with signings at the Mayor's reception room in Philadelphia City Hall, and the African American Museum in Philadelphia.

== Death ==
Lois Fernandez died peacefully at home on August 13, 2017. Several hundred people attended her "home-going service" at the Universal Audenried Charter High School. They included musician Kenny Gamble, radio personality Patty Jackson, City Councilman Kenyatta Johnson and state Representatives Bob Brady and Jordan A. Harris.
