= Key Elementary School =

Key Elementary School may refer to:

- Francis Scott Key School in Philadelphia
- Francis Scott Key Elementary School in Washington, DC - District of Columbia Public Schools
- Francis Scott Key Elementary/Middle School in Baltimore, Maryland - Baltimore City Public Schools
- Francis Scott Key Elementary School in Arlington, Virginia - Arlington Public Schools
- Francis Scott Key Elementary School in District Heights, Maryland - Prince George's County Public Schools
- Francis Scott Key Elementary School in San Francisco - San Francisco Unified School District
