= Bok Tower =

Bok Tower may refer to:

- BOK Tower, skyscraper in Downtown Tulsa, Oklahoma, United States
- Bok Tower Gardens, Iron Mountain, north of Lake Wales, Florida, United States

== See also ==
- Edward W. Bok Technical High School, in Philadelphia, Pennsylvania, United States
