= Harry Gorodetzer =

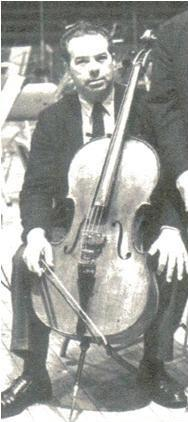
- During a rehearsal

Background information
- Born: Harry Gorodetzer
- Genre: Classical
- Occupation: Cellist
- Instrument: Cello
- Years active: 1936–1985

Harry Gorodetzer (1914–2002) was a cellist for the Philadelphia Orchestra for 50 seasons during a period in which the orchestra received world-wide acclaim for its "Philadelphia Sound". It was during this time that the orchestra also produced some of its most well-known recordings.

Gorodetzer was the last musician hired for the orchestra by conductor Leopold Stokowski. In 1936, while still a student at the Curtis Institute of Music, Gorodetzer auditioned for Stokowski, who would soon turn over his post as orchestra director to Eugene Ormandy. Ormandy was also present at the audition. Gorodetzer played again for Stokowski when Stokowski conducted the Philadelphia Orchestra's performance of the musical score of the 1940 Walt Disney movie Fantasia.

During his long career, Gorodetzer performed with many great musicians and was one of the orchestra's most social members during seminal visits around the world, including their historic 1973 tour of the People's Republic of China, where they were the first Western symphony orchestra to visit in decades.

== Personal ==
Gorodetzer's grandfather was a town musician in Ukraine, and his father conducted the Walnut Street Theater Orchestra for many years. As a child, Gorodetzer began to take violin lessons, but since his fingers were too big, he switched to the cello at the age of 12. After graduating from South Philadelphia High School, he enrolled in the Curtis Institute of Music. While he missed his first tour with the school orchestra because he was completing his studies, that was the only tour he missed until he retired from the Philadelphia Orchestra in 1985.

His brother, Sam, was also a graduate of Curtis and a member of the Philadelphia Orchestra, playing in their bass section. Gorodetzer is the grandfather of psychologist Scott Barry Kaufman.
