= Jihad Ward =

American football player (born 1994)

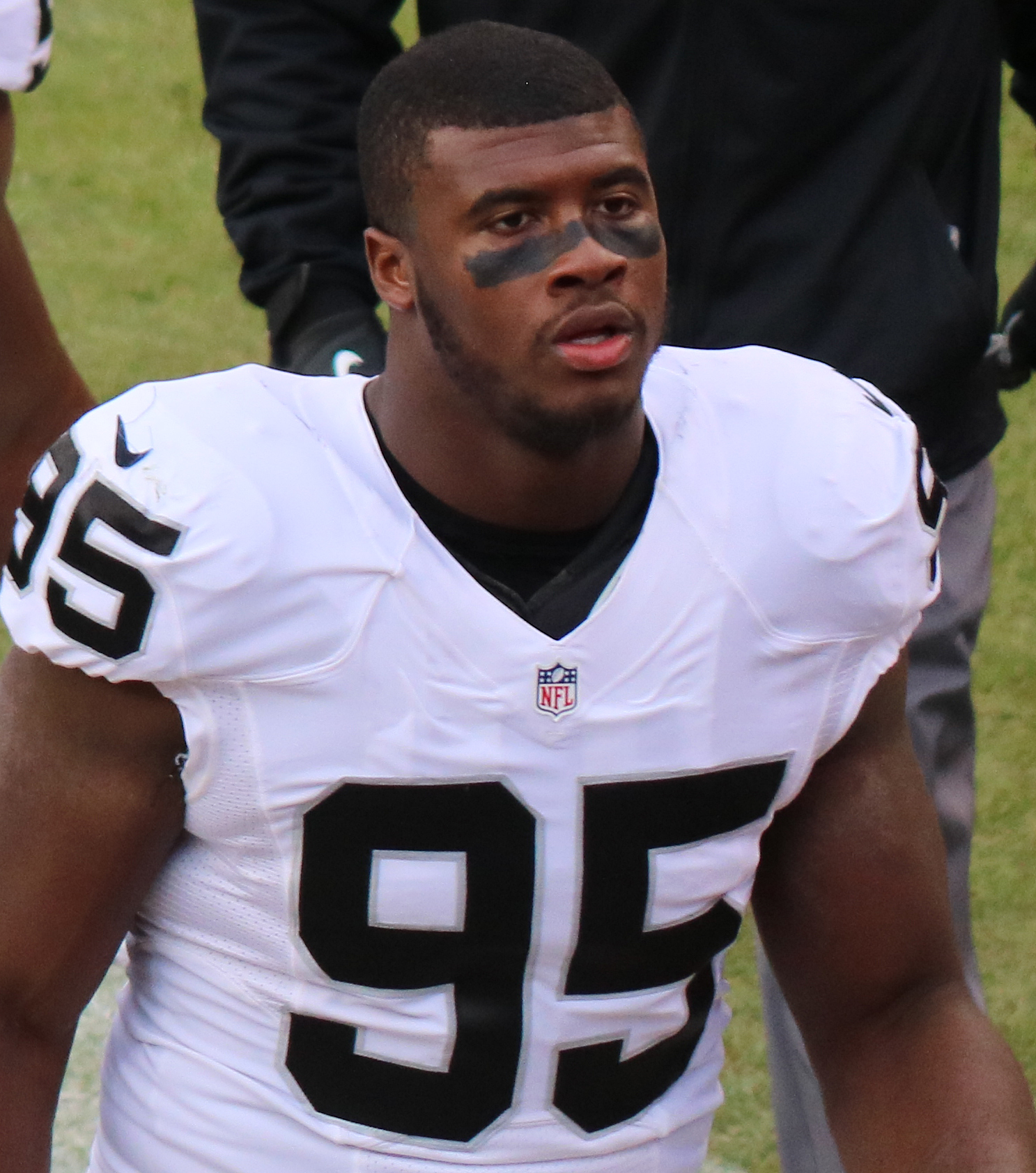
- Ward with the Oakland Raiders in 2016

No. 52 – Minnesota Vikings
- Position: Outside linebacker
- Roster status: Practice squad

Personal information
- Born: May 11, 1994 (age 32); Philadelphia, Pennsylvania, U.S.
- Listed height: 6 ft 5 in (1.96 m)
- Listed weight: 285 lb (129 kg)

Career information
- High school: Edward W. Bok Technical (Philadelphia)
- College: Globe Tech (2012–2013); Illinois (2014–2015)
- NFL draft: 2016: 2nd round, 44th overall pick

Career history
- Oakland Raiders (2016–2017); Dallas Cowboys (2018)*; Indianapolis Colts (2018–2019); Baltimore Ravens (2019–2020); Jacksonville Jaguars (2021); New York Giants (2022–2023); Minnesota Vikings (2024); Tennessee Titans (2025); Minnesota Vikings (2026)*; New York Giants (2026); Minnesota Vikings (2026–present)*
- * Offseason or practice squad member only

Career NFL statistics as of Week 7, 2026
- Total tackles: 200
- Sacks: 24.0
- Forced fumbles: 3
- Fumble recoveries: 5
- Pass deflections: 12
- Stats at Pro Football Reference

Jihad Ward (/dʒɪˈhɑːd/ jih-HAHD; born May 11, 1994) is an American professional football outside linebacker for the Minnesota Vikings for the National Football League (NFL). He played college football for the Illinois Fighting Illini and selected by the Oakland Raiders in the second round of the 2016 NFL draft. Ward has also played for the Indianapolis Colts, Baltimore Ravens, Jacksonville Jaguars, New York Giants, Minnesota Vikings, and Tennessee Titans.

== Early life ==
Ward attended Edward W. Bok Technical High School in Philadelphia, Pennsylvania. He didn't play football until his sophomore year. He began as a wide receiver and safety, before being converted into a stand up defensive end as a junior.

He received second-team All-City (2010) and first-team All-City (2011) honors. He also practiced basketball.

== College career ==
Ward attended Globe Institute of Technology for two years to improve his grades. In 2013, he played in 7 games, making 26 tackles (3 for loss) and 2 sacks.

In 2014, he transferred to the University of Illinois. He was named a starter at defensive end in the fourth game of the season. He posted 51 tackles, 3 sacks, 4 fumble recoveries (led the conference), 2 forced fumbles, and one pass defended.

As a senior, he started all 12 games, playing both at defensive end and defensive tackle. He registered 53 tackles, 1.5 sacks, 2 passes defensed, one forced fumble and one fumble recovery. Against the University of Iowa, he had a career-high 11 tackles, including nine solo.

In his last two years, he had 104 tackles, 5.5 sacks, four forced fumbles, and three passes defensed.

== Professional career ==
=== Pre-draft ===
Coming out of college, most analysts projected Ward to be a second or third round selection. Although analysts had said he has above average athletic ability for a man his size, can play both end spots in a 3–4 or 4–3, is large enough to play defensive tackle in 4–3, and could become a quality pass rusher in the NFL, he was also seen as a developmental project who needs improvement in his power, and has inconsistent balance in contact.

Ward was invited to the NFL Scouting Combine and also participated at Illinois' Pro Day and even improved on the majority of his combine numbers. Representatives and scouts from all 32 teams showed up at Illinois' Pro Day, which was run by head coach Lovie Smith. Defensive line coaches from the New England Patriots, Cincinnati Bengals, and the Houston Texans came especially to watch Ward perform.

Pre-draft measurables
Height	Weight	Arm length	Hand span	Wingspan	40-yard dash	10-yard split	20-yard split	20-yard shuttle	Three-cone drill	Vertical jump	Broad jump	Bench press
6 ft 5 1/8 in (1.96 m)	297 lb (135 kg)	33 7/8 in (0.86 m)	9 3/8 in (0.24 m)	6 ft 9 1/8 in (2.06 m)	5.09 s	1.80 s	2.96 s	4.63 s	7.38 s	28.0 in (0.71 m)	9 ft 3 in (2.82 m)	22 reps
All values from NFL Scouting Combine/Pro Day

=== Oakland Raiders ===
Ward was selected by the Oakland Raiders in the second round (44th overall) of the 2016 NFL draft, after dropping because he had a knee injury that was expected to require arthroscopic surgery. Ward didn't participate much in organized team activities during the offseason. Ward finished his rookie season with 30 tackles in 16 games, 13 of which were starts.

On July 6, 2017, it was revealed that he had surgery on his left foot after injuring it during a workout, putting him out of action until mid-August. The injury limited him during the season, playing in only five games and was declared inactive in ten contests.

=== Dallas Cowboys ===
On April 28, 2018, the Raiders traded Ward to the Dallas Cowboys in exchange for wide receiver Ryan Switzer. Cowboys defensive coordinator Rod Marinelli coached Ward in the 2016 Senior Bowl.

On September 1, 2018, the Cowboys waived Ward during final roster cuts.

=== Indianapolis Colts ===
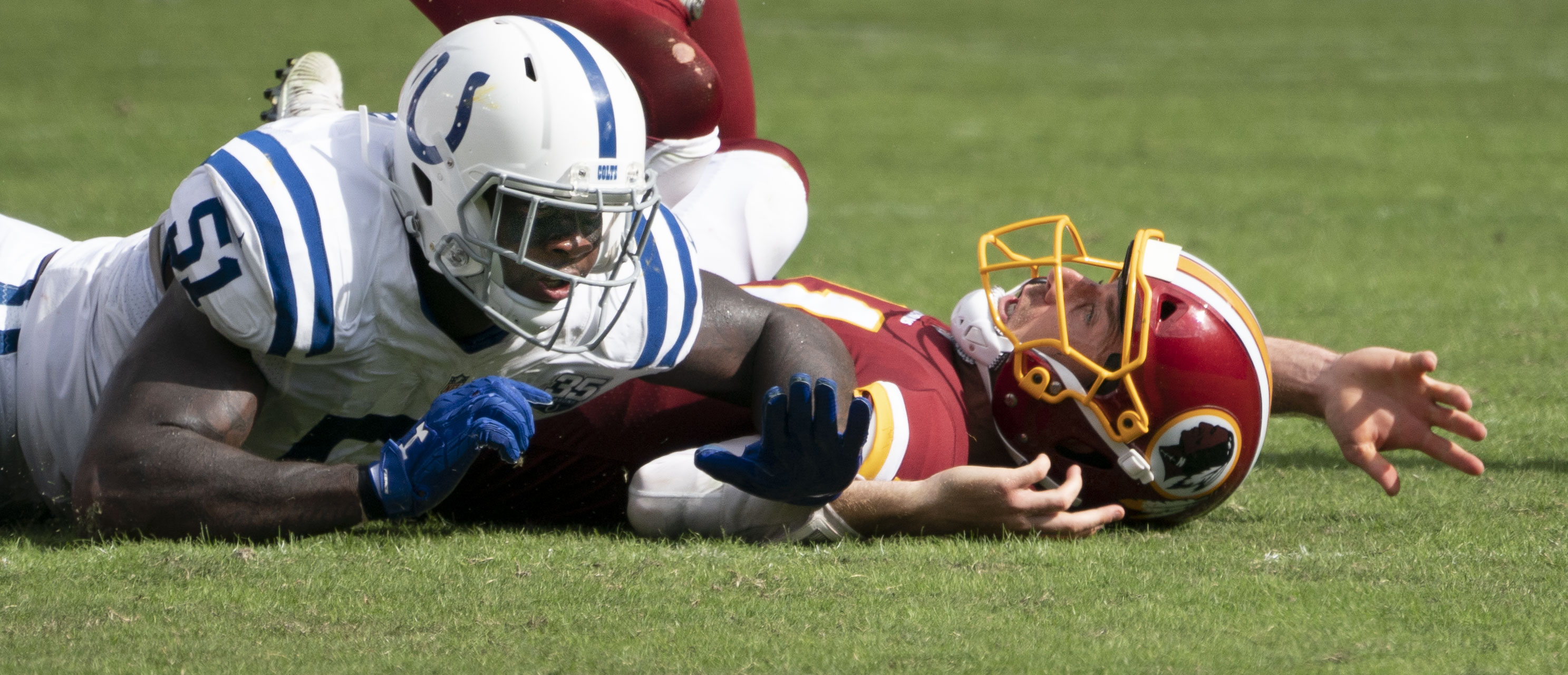
Jihad Ward in a game against the Washington Redskins in 2018

On September 3, 2018, the Indianapolis Colts signed Ward to their practice squad. The team promoted him to the active roster on September 13, 2018. He was placed on injured reserve on October 26, 2018, with an ankle injury. Despite only playing in six games in the 2018 season, he recorded three sacks.

On October 1, 2019, Ward was released by the Colts.

=== Baltimore Ravens ===
On October 7, 2019, Ward was signed by the Baltimore Ravens. In the 2019 season, he appeared in 14 games and had one sack.

On March 21, 2020, Ward re-signed with the Ravens. He was placed on the reserve/COVID-19 list by the team on November 26, 2020, and activated on December 5, 2020. He appeared in ten games in the 2020 season. He had three sacks, 16 total tackles, and two passes defended.

=== Jacksonville Jaguars ===
On March 17, 2021, Ward signed a one-year, $2.5 million contract with the Jacksonville Jaguars. Ward appeared in all 17 games and started one. He recorded two sacks and 32 total tackles (ten solo).

=== New York Giants (first stint) ===
On March 21, 2022, Ward signed with the New York Giants on a one-year contract. He played in 17 games with 11 starts, recording a career-high 43 tackles and three sacks.

Ward re-signed with the Giants on March 29, 2023. He played in all 17 games with nine starts. recording a career-high five sacks.

=== Minnesota Vikings (first stint) ===
On March 20, 2024, Ward signed with the Minnesota Vikings. He finished the 2024 season with one sack, ten tackles, one pass defended, and one fumble recovery.

=== Tennessee Titans ===
On July 24, 2025, Ward signed with the Tennessee Titans. He finished the 2025 season with five sacks, 31 total tackles (15 solo), and four passes defended.

=== Minnesota Vikings (second stint) ===
On September 9, 2026, Ward was signed to the Minnesota Vikings' practice squad.

=== New York Giants (second stint) ===
On September 30, 2026, Ward signed with the New York Giants off the Vikings practice squad. On October 20, 2026, the Giants released Ward.

=== Minnesota Vikings (third stint) ===
On October 23, 2026, Ward re-signed with the Minnesota Vikings practice squad.

== NFL career statistics ==
Legend
**Bold**	Career high

=== Regular season ===
Year	Team	Games		Tackles					Interceptions						Fumbles				
Year	Team	GP	GS	Cmb	Solo	Ast	Sck	TFL	Int	Yds	Avg	Lng	TD	PD	FF	Fum	FR	Yds	TD
2016	OAK	16	**13**	30	16	14	0.0	0	0	0	0.0	0	0	0	0	0	1	0	0
2017	OAK	5	1	2	1	1	1.0	1	0	0	0.0	0	0	0	0	0	0	0	0
2018	IND	6	0	4	4	0	3.0	3	0	0	0.0	0	0	0	0	0	0	0	0
2019	IND	3	0	0	0	0	0.0	0	0	0	0.0	0	0	1	0	0	0	0	0
2019	BAL	11	0	7	3	4	1.0	1	0	0	0.0	0	0	0	0	0	**2**	2	0
2020	BAL	10	0	16	7	9	3.0	4	0	0	0.0	0	0	2	0	0	0	0	0
2021	JAX	**17**	1	32	10	**22**	2.0	3	0	0	0.0	0	0	0	0	0	0	0	0
2022	NYG	**17**	11	**43**	**28**	15	3.0	**7**	0	0	0.0	0	0	**4**	**2**	0	0	0	0
2023	NYG	**17**	9	24	16	8	**5.0**	5	0	0	0.0	0	0	0	1	0	1	**7**	0
2024	MIN	**17**	2	10	5	5	1.0	1	0	0	0.0	0	0	1	0	0	1	2	0
2025	TEN	**17**	12	31	15	16	**5.0**	4	0	0	0.0	0	0	**4**	0	0	0	0	0
2026	NYG	2	0	1	1	0	0.0	0	0	0	0.0	0	0	0	0	0	0	0	0
Career		138	49	200	106	94	24.0	29	0	0	0.0	0	0	12	3	0	5	11	0

=== Postseason ===
Year	Team	Games		Tackles					Interceptions						Fumbles				
Year	Team	GP	GS	Cmb	Solo	Ast	Sck	TFL	Int	Yds	Avg	Lng	TD	PD	FF	Fum	FR	Yds	TD
2019	BAL	1	0	2	2	0	0.0	0	0	0	0.0	0	0	0	0	0	0	0	0
2020	BAL	**2**	0	**3**	**3**	0	0.0	**1**	0	0	0.0	0	0	0	0	0	0	0	0
2022	NYG	**2**	**1**	**3**	**3**	0	0.0	**1**	0	0	0.0	0	0	0	0	0	0	0	0
2024	MIN	1	**1**	2	0	**2**	0.0	0	0	0	0.0	0	0	0	0	0	0	0	0
Career		6	2	10	8	2	0.0	2	0	0	0.0	0	0	0	0	0	0	0	0

== Personal life ==
Ward is Muslim. He has said that his name, Jihad, which is popular where he was raised in Philadelphia, has been misunderstood due to the negative connotations associated with the term, which has been used to describe Islamic violence against non-Muslims.
