= Joe Powell (American football) =

American gridiron football player (born 1994)

Profile
- Position: Safety

Personal information
- Born: February 25, 1994 (age 32); Portsmouth, Virginia, U.S.
- Listed height: 6 ft 2 in (1.88 m)
- Listed weight: 205 lb (93 kg)

Career information
- High school: I. C. Norcom (Portsmouth, Virginia)
- College: Globe Tech (2013)
- NFL draft: 2014: undrafted

Career history
- Lehigh Valley Steelhawks (2015); Cleveland Gladiators (2016); New York Giants (2016)*; Buffalo Bills (2016)*; Atlanta Havoc (2018); Baltimore Brigade (2018); Birmingham Iron (2019); Baltimore Brigade (2019); St. Louis BattleHawks (2020); Hamilton Tiger-Cats (2020–2021)*; Arlington Renegades (2023); Carolina Cobras (2024); Arlington Renegades (2024–2025)
- * Offseason or practice squad member only

Awards and highlights
- XFL champion (2023); PIFL Defensive Rookie of the Year (2015); Second-team All-Arena (2018)

Career AFL statistics
- Total tackles: 41
- Pass deflections: 6
- Interceptions: 5
- Stats at ArenaFan.com
- Stats at Pro Football Reference

Joe Powell (born February 25, 1994) is an American professional gridiron football safety. He played college football at Globe Institute of Technology in Manhattan, New York City.

== Early life ==
Powell prepped at I. C. Norcom High School in Portsmouth, Virginia, where he played football and track & field.

== College career ==
Powell played one season of football at Globe Institute of Technology, totaling 53 tackles, 1.5 sacks and one interception in 2013.

== Professional career ==
Pre-draft measurables
| Height | Weight | Arm length | Hand span | 40-yard dash | 10-yard split | 20-yard split | 20-yard shuttle | Three-cone drill | Vertical jump | Broad jump | Bench press |
|---|---|---|---|---|---|---|---|---|---|---|---|
| 6 ft 0 1/8 in (1.83 m) | 191 lb (87 kg) | 30 1/2 in (0.77 m) | 8 7/8 in (0.23 m) | 4.80 s | 1.70 s | 2.83 s | 4.40 s | 7.31 s | 30.0 in (0.76 m) | 9 ft 11 in (3.02 m) | 12 reps |
All values from Pro Day

=== Lehigh Valley Steelhawks ===
Powell was signed by the Lehigh Valley Steelhawks of the Professional Indoor Football League (PIFL) in 2015. He earned PIFL Defensive Rookie of the Year honors after recording 52.5 tackles and 11 interceptions.

=== Cleveland Gladiators ===
Powell was assigned to the Cleveland Gladiators of the Arena Football League on August 11, 2015. He played for the team during the 2016 season.

Powell attended rookie minicamp with the Philadelphia Eagles on a tryout basis in May 2016.

=== New York Giants ===
Powell signed with the New York Giants on August 17, 2016. On August 30, he was waived by the Giants.

=== Buffalo Bills ===
On October 25, 2016, Powell was signed to the Buffalo Bills' practice squad. He signed a reserve/future contract with the Bills on January 2, 2017. On September 2, Powell was waived by the Bills.

=== Atlanta Havoc ===
Powell signed with the Atlanta Havoc on January 19, 2018.

=== First stint with Brigade ===
On March 22, 2018, Powell was assigned to the Baltimore Brigade.

=== Birmingham Iron ===
Powell signed with the Birmingham Iron of the Alliance of American Football (AAF) for the 2019 season.

=== Second stint with Brigade ===
After the AAF suspended football operations, Powell was assigned to the Baltimore Brigade on April 7, 2019.

=== St. Louis Battlehawks ===
In October 2019, Powell was drafted by the St. Louis BattleHawks of the XFL in the 2020 XFL draft. He scored the first special teams touchdown in the second generation of the XFL on February 23, 2020, scoring on a 90-yard kickoff return, which featured a reverse that he received from Keith Mumphery. He had his contract terminated when the league suspended operations on April 10.

=== Hamilton Tiger-Cats ===
On April 13, 2020, Powell signed with the Hamilton Tiger-Cats. He was released by the Tiger-Cats on April 22, 2021.

=== Arlington Renegades (first stint) ===
Powell was selected by the Arlington Renegades in the 2023 XFL draft. He was not part of the roster after the 2024 UFL dispersal draft on January 15, 2024.

=== Carolina Cobras ===
On January 16, 2024, Powell signed with the Carolina Cobras of the National Arena League (NAL).

=== Arlington Renegades (second stint) ===
On April 30, 2024, Powell re-signed with the Renegades. He re-signed with the team again on October 8.
