= Globe Institute of Technology =

Private college in New York, U.S.

- Motto: The College for You
- Type: Private Coeducational
- Active: 1985–September 15, 2016
- Location: 500 7th Avenue, New York, New York, U.S. 40.75313°N 73.98927°W
- Campus: Urban
- Colors: Blue, black, white
- Nickname: Knights
- Sporting affiliations: NJCAA
- Website: globe.edu

Globe Institute of Technology was a private for-profit college in New York City. It offered baccalaureate, associate, and certificate programs in business and information technology as well as a sports program. Globe Institute of Technology was accredited by the New York State Board of Regents prior to ceasing operations in 2016.

== Notable alumni ==
- Joe Powell, professional gridiron football player
- Jihad Ward, professional gridiron football player

== See also ==
- List of defunct colleges and universities in New York
