= Edward W. Bok Technical High School =

- Edward Bok Technical High School
- U.S. National Register of Historic Places
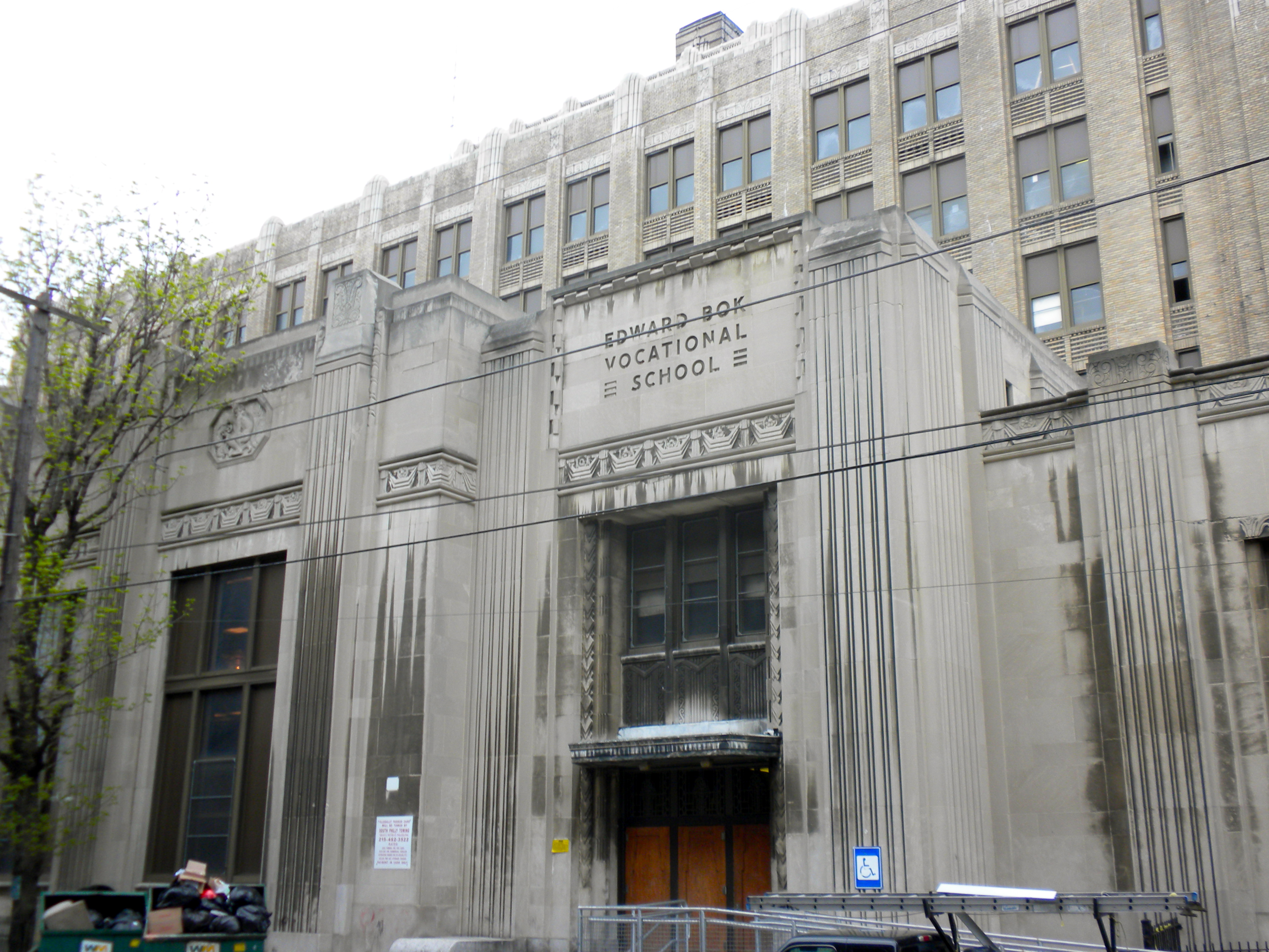

- Location within Philadelphia Location within Pennsylvania Location within the United States
- Location: 800 Mifflin Street, Philadelphia, Pennsylvania
- Coordinates: 39°55′33″N 75°9′37″W
- Area: 1 acre (0.40 ha)
- Built: 1938
- Architect: Irwin T. Catharine
- MPS: Philadelphia Public Schools TR
- NRHP reference No.: 86003264
- Added to NRHP: December 4, 1986

The Edward W. Bok Technical High School was a public high school in Philadelphia, Pennsylvania, designed by Irwin T. Catharine and named after literary figure Edward William Bok, editor of the Ladies' Home Journal. It was completed in February 1938 by the Public Works Administration (WPA) as a vocational high school at 8th & Mifflin Streets. As part of the Philadelphia Public Schools' Multiple Property Submission, the school was listed on the National Register of Historic Places in December, 1986. Bok High School was reorganized in 2006-2007 to prepare students for jobs in modern technology. After the 2012-2013 school year, the school was closed. In 2014, the school was renovated to become a home for over 200 businesses including restaurants, art studios, daycares, and hair salons.

== History ==
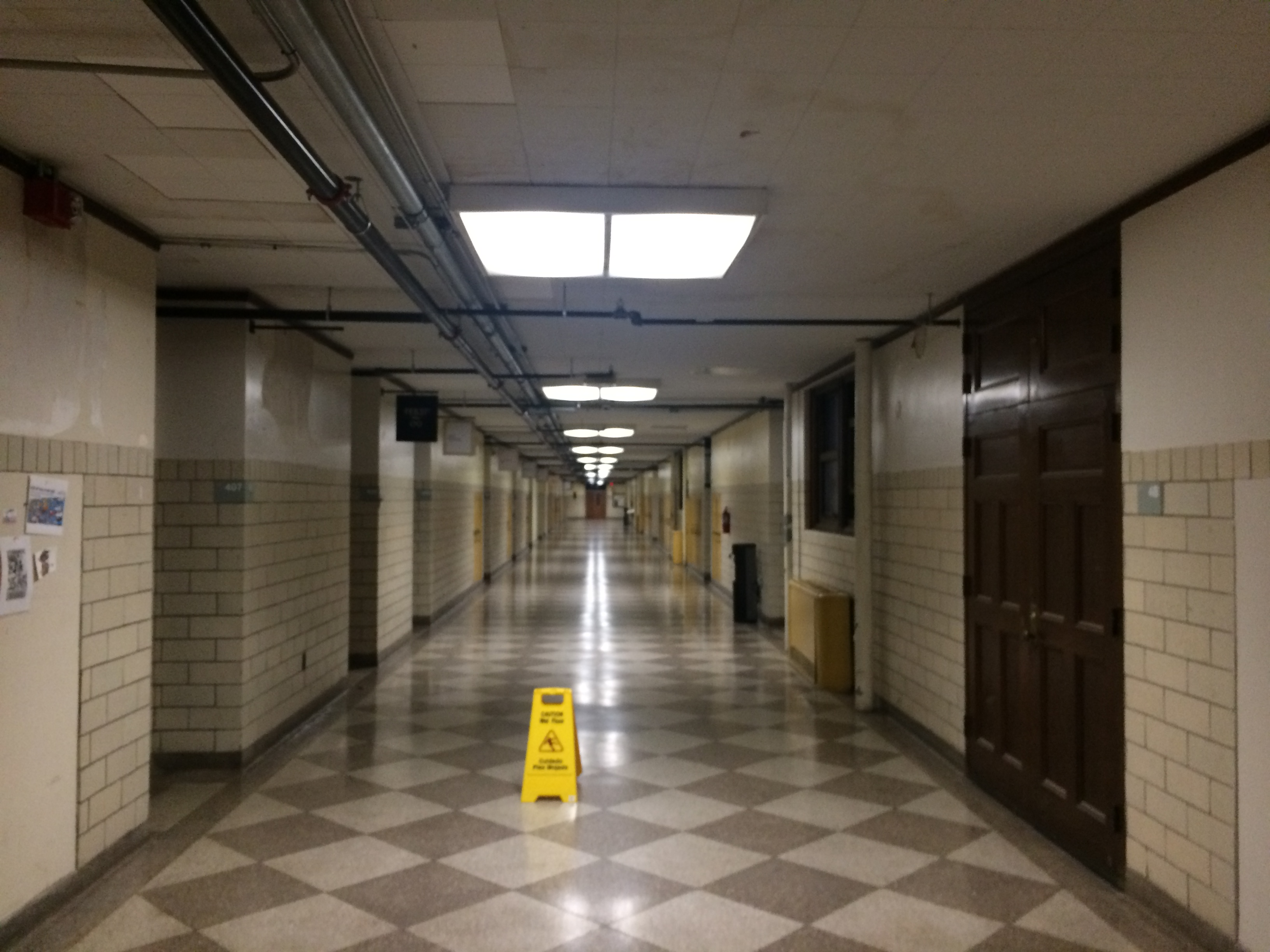
Corridor in Bok in 2019.

The building was constructed from 1935-1938 based on the designs of Philadelphia School Board architect Irwin Catharine. The main body of the school is built of limestone-trimmed yellow brick, with a limestone low-rise section abutting the higher brick section. Piers and pilasters emphasize verticality in the Art Deco design. Carved cartouches show people at work. Classrooms adjoin one of two central light courts. At the time of its construction, the building represented a new trend in vocational education. Rather than just teach carpentry skills, the school taught, and had dedicated space for, subjects such as brick laying, plastering, plumbing, machine building, tailoring, and hairdressing.

The school was named for Edward Bok (1863–1930), a Dutch born American editor and Pulitzer Prize-winning author, who edited the Ladies Home Journal for thirty years.

Following the school's 2013 closing, some of the classes moved into the South Philadelphia High School (SPHS or Southern) building, 5 blocks away, prior to the start of the 2013-14 school year. Bok was scheduled to merge with South Philadelphia High. The building itself remained open for maintenance & operational reasons for at least 1 additional heating season as the boilers supply heat to Southwark School across the street.

=== Redevelopment into the Bok Building ===
In Summer 2014, Bok was put up for auction by the School District and the Philadelphia Industrial Development Corporation (PIDC). Design and development firm, Scout Ltd., proposed to repurpose the space and was selected, in September 2014, with the task of transforming the vacant 340,000 sq. ft. building into a new destination for local makers, nonprofits, small businesses, and artists. The building's technical capacities aided in converting the space into commercial workshops and studios, which are now home to over 200 businesses—including a daycare, several cosmetic salons, education groups, a coffee shop and an award-winning rooftop bar—and attracting over 100,000 visitors annually.

== Academic programs ==
Programs were designed to develop students into well-rounded individuals. In addition to regular academic and vocational course offerings, there were specialized programs in Business Technology Computer Assisted Design (CAD), Construction Trades, Culinary Arts, Computer/Networking, Health Related Sciences, Process Technology and Welding. Auto mechanics was also an elective.

Bok offered men's and women's interscholastic sports including: football, baseball, basketball, soccer, softball, track and field, volleyball, badminton, cheerleading, drill, team, and weight training. After School Clubs provided special enrichment activities for students. Bok was the only community high school in the city housing programs such as Sunrise of Philadelphia, Inc. and Variety the Children's Charity

== Recognition ==
As of 2010, Bok had achieved Adequate Yearly Progress (AYP) for 5 years straight. It has since been determined that their principal, Arthur "Larry" Melton, altered test answers to obtain that distinction. Their scores predictably returned to pre-scandal levels once Melton was convicted of cheating on the PSSA (Pennsylvania System of School Assessment).

== Notable alumni ==
- Willie McClung (1930–2002), former NFL player
- Joseph Tarsia (1934–2022), recording engineer
- Sherman Hemsley (1938–2012), Actor
- Bunny Sigler (1941–2017), Philly Soul singer, songwriter and producer
- Jihad Ward (born 1994), NFL player
