= Willie McClung =

American gridiron football player (1930–2002)

No. 76, 78, 70, 65
- Positions: Offensive tackle, defensive tackle

Personal information
- Born: May 9, 1930; Marion, Arkansas, U.S.
- Died: July 28, 2002 (aged 72); Pittsburgh, Pennsylvania, U.S.
- Listed height: 6 ft 2 in (1.88 m)
- Listed weight: 250 lb (113 kg)

Career information
- High school: Edward W. Bok Technical (Philadelphia, Pennsylvania)
- College: Florida A&M
- NFL draft: 1955: undrafted

Career history
- Pittsburgh Steelers (1955–1957); Cleveland Browns (1958–1959); Detroit Lions (1960–1961); Hamilton Tiger-Cats (1962)

Career NFL statistics
- Games played: 74
- Games started: 55
- Fumble recoveries: 5
- Stats at Pro Football Reference

William Albert McClung (May 9, 1930 – July 28, 2002) was a professional American football offensive lineman in the National Football League. He played seven seasons for the Pittsburgh Steelers (1955–1957), the Cleveland Browns (1958–1959), the Detroit Lions (1960–1961) and the Hamilton Tiger Cats (1962).
