= 1910 Philadelphia general strike =

Philadelphia General Strike (1910)
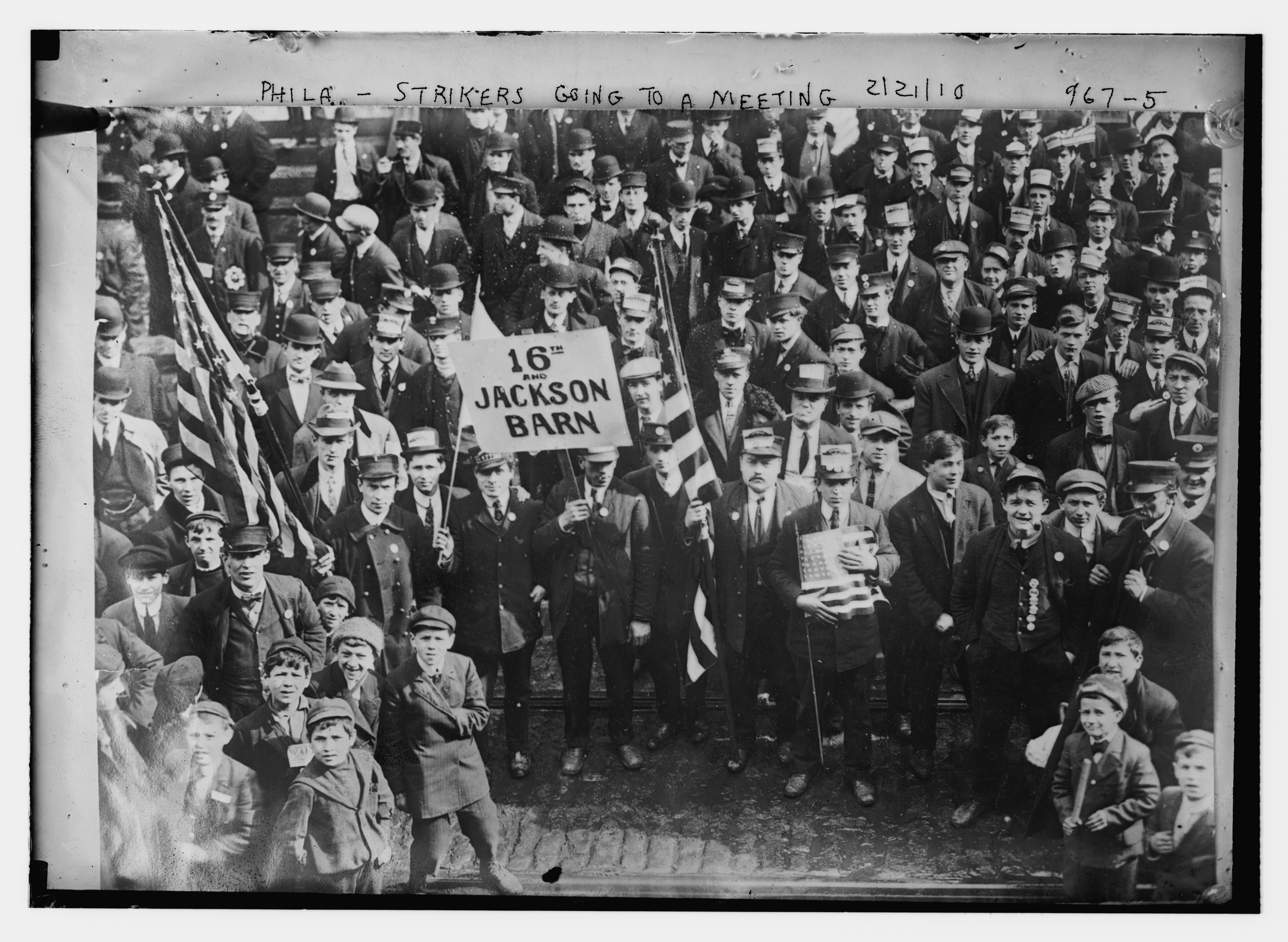
- Crowd of strikers protesting
- Date: February 19– April 19, 1910
- Location: Philadelphia, Pennsylvania
- Goals: Pay increases
- Result: Arrests of strikers; Trolley fare freeze; Wage increase

Number
| 60,000-75,000 | |

Casualties and losses
| 27 streetcar passengers, including 15 children killed by inexperienced replacement drivers | |

The General Strike of 1910 was a labor strike by trolley workers of the Philadelphia Rapid Transit Company that grew to a citywide riot and general strike in Philadelphia, Pennsylvania, United States.

== Background ==
=== 1909 strike ===
On May 29, 1909, a committee of the local AFL affiliate Amalgamated Association of Street and Electric Railway Employees of America approached officials of the Philadelphia Rapid Transit Company (PRT) with demands for an hourly wage of 25 cents for motormen and conductors, the right to buy their uniforms on the open market, limits of workdays to 9 or 10 hours and recognition of the Association. Officials at PRT refused to meet with the committee, triggering a strike.

PRT responded by bringing in strike breakers from New York City and Boston, notably strikebreakers working for Pearl Bergoff near the beginning of his career as "King of the Strikebreakers". Violence broke out, with trolley cars, tracks and wiring destroyed, police brutality and wholesale arrests of strikers. Given the population's general dislike of the company for poor service, mismanagement and backroom political dealings, the union felt safe issuing an ultimatum. John J. Murphy of the Central Labor Union issued the terms:

If the Philadelphia Rapid Transit Company does not meet the demands of the trolley workers by Thursday night (June 7), a strike of all organized labor bodies of Philadelphia affiliated with the Central Labor Union, representing 75,000 men, will be called for Friday morning. The present strike is only a beginning of the fight which will be waged by organized labor to emancipate the city of Philadelphia from the thraldom of capitalism.

State Senator James P. McNichol met with the union and Mayor Reyburn urged PRT to settle. On June 2, 1909, an agreement was announced. The workers received a wage increase from 21 to 22 cents per hour, a ten-hour work day, the right to buy uniforms from five clothiers and recognition of the union. The company, however, soon ignored one of the key terms of the deal by establishing a replacement union, refusing to meet with representatives of Amalgamated and giving choice jobs and promotions to members of PRT's union.

=== New negotiations ===
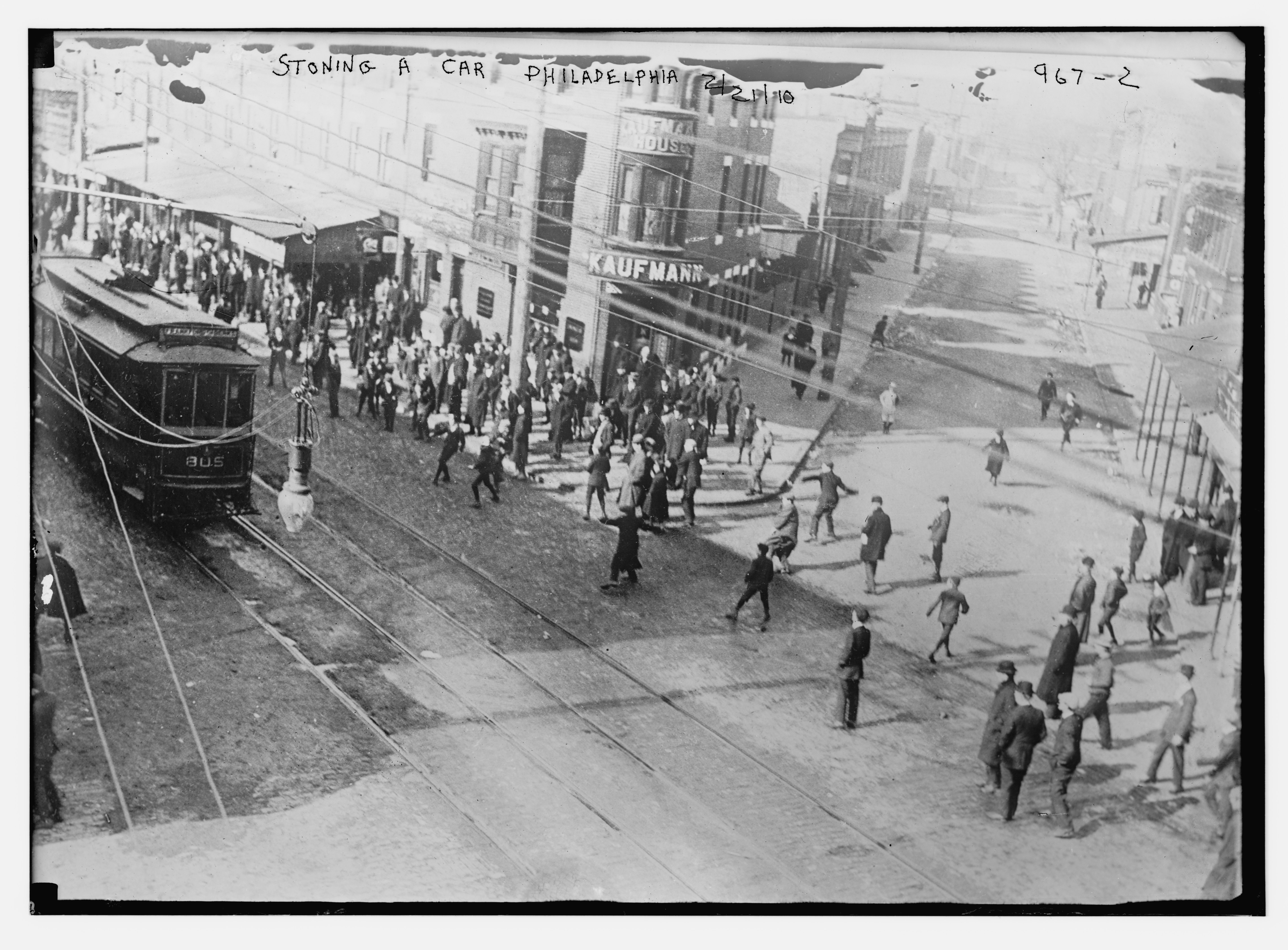
Protesters stoning a trolley car that is attempting to break the strike

In December 1909 the Amalgamated union made new demands for a wage increase to 25 cents an hour. PRT flatly refused and on January 1, 1910, without union discussion, announced a complicated "welfare plan" for the workers; keeping the 22 cents an hour pay rate and adding insurance and pension provisions. Two days later, the company fired seven workers for announcing they were joining Amalgamated and denouncing the welfare provisions as the company's attempt to undermine union demands. Amalgamated requested arbitration, which the company refused. A strike vote was called. With over 5,300 votes cast, the strike was approved with less than 5% voting against. The strike resolution charged PRT with creating "dissention and discord" by forming the company-controlled union, favoring employees antagonistic to Amalgamated, refusing to address grievances, attempting to prevent workers from joining Amalgamated, firing workers who joined and refusing arbitration. The resolution left the timing of the actual strike to Amalgamated's executive board. Local newspapers, citing the near unanimity of the vote and the union's obvious strength, urged PRT to give the situation urgent attention. PRT issued a statement saying "The strike vote will not change the attitude of the company the slightest." Mayor Reyburn endorsed the company's position, calling the union members "semi-public functionaries" who owe their service to the city.

Negotiations slowly got under way and labored on until mid-February. AFL President Samuel Gompers urged PRT to join the union in arbitration to reach a settlement. PRT dismissed the offer saying they had the situation under control and stating they intended to uphold the rights of workers to join or not join a union of their choosing and breaking off negotiations. On February 19, 1910, PRT fired 173 workers, all of them members of the union, "for the good of the service" and hired replacement workers from New York City. Immediately after the firings, the union leadership ordered the strike, taking their respective trolley cars off the streets effective at 1:00 that afternoon.

== The strike & riots ==
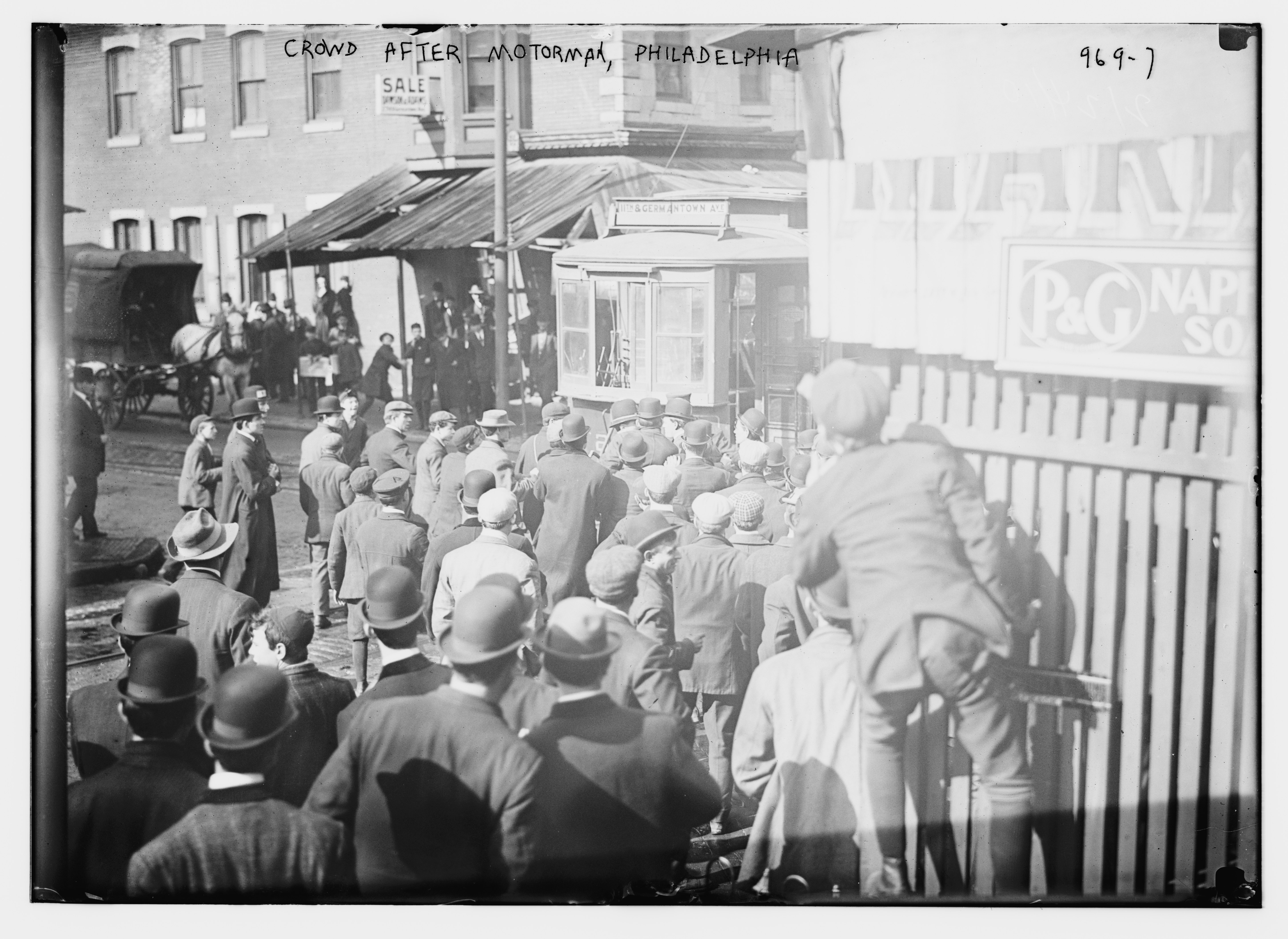
Strikers clamoring for motorman of trolley car who is attempting to break the strike

On the first day of the strike, Mayor Reyburn dispatched heavy police guard to the trolley barns. The union claimed 6,200 of the PRT's 7,000 employees walked out. PRT claimed 3,000 workers remained on the job.

It was reported worldwide that one volunteer motorman, "driving his car full-speed through the crowd with one hand on the controller and the other holding a revolver, was dragged from the platform when the car had been wrecked by a spiked switch, and killed".

Mobs pulled down the masonry of a school being built at 9th and Mifflin streets (Southwark School), using the stones to block the tracks and build makeshift bunkers. As a trolley with police guards approached, the crowd of 1,500 cheered, then smashed the car with rocks and clubs. Both police officers were knocked unconscious and an eight-year-old boy suffered a fatal blow to the head. Similar events occurred throughout the city, with tracks, lines and trolley cars destroyed.

At Smith's Hall, police commandeered heavy equipment to force their way in while the mob showered them with rocks, bricks and tools from a second-story window. When the battle was over, 12 were arrested and 20 people were hospitalized.

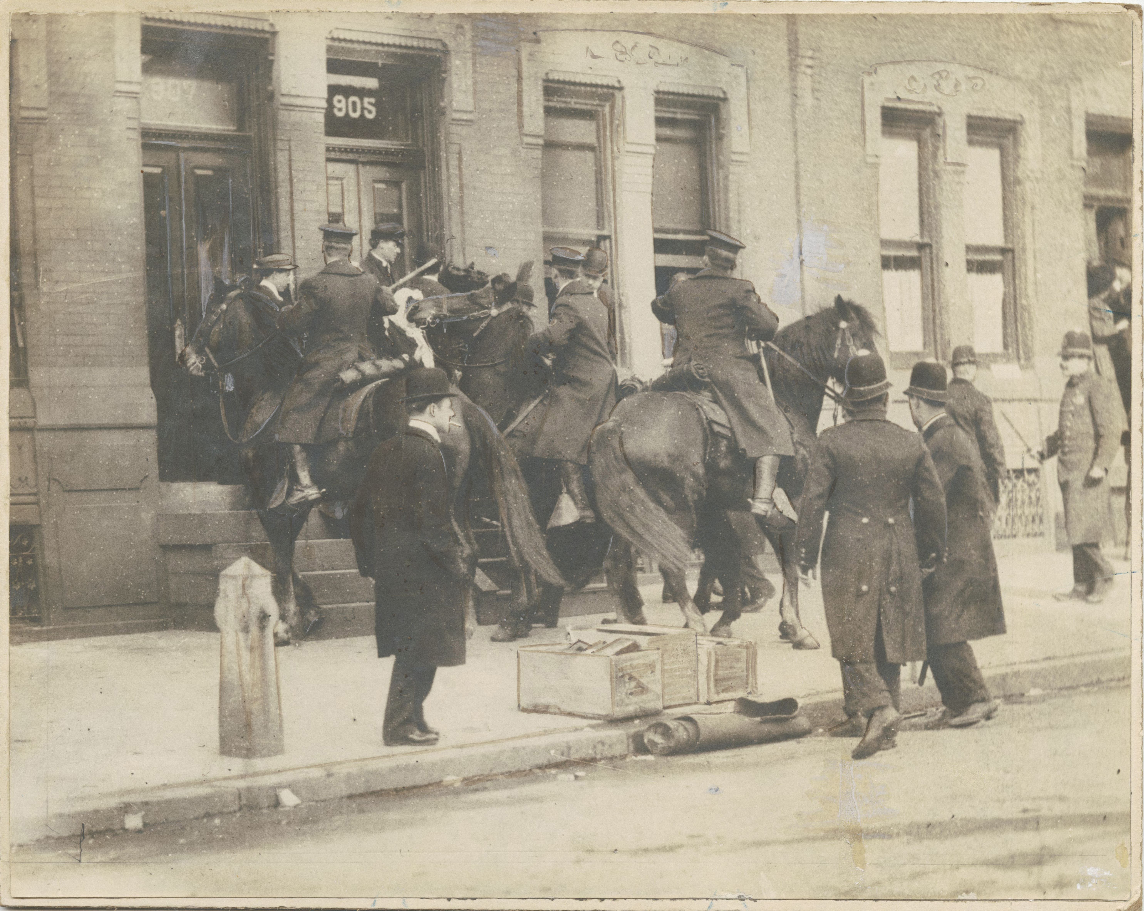
Policemen chase a demonstrator during the strike

A crowd of 2,000 seized a trolley that was blocked by several other cars they had destroyed. After the crew and police were driven off, the trolley was doused with fuel and set on fire. Meanwhile, a crowd of 5,000 had blockaded tracks in Center City. When a trolley approached the crew was seized, dragged into the street and beaten while the police watched helplessly. While one officer attempted to back the trolley out, the other fired warning shots into the air. The mob responded with a massive barrage of bricks and stones and the police fired randomly into the crowd. A bomb threat in Germantown was disregarded until dynamite was loaded onto the tracks by a mob of 2,000. In Kensington, Richmond and South Philadelphia, the mayor ordered police to act under provisions of the Riot Act. The mayor called for 3,000 citizens to serve police duty. Amalgamated offered 6,000 union men -- "bonafide citizens of Philadelphia (to) preserve peace and order"—an offer the mayor rejected. By 6 p.m. the next day, PRT had ordered all trolleys off the streets while promising service would be restored the following morning.

In stark contrast to the chaos throughout the city, the union leaders enjoyed a sort of victory parade, taxied through cheering crowds to a series of speeches at several locations.

=== General strike ===
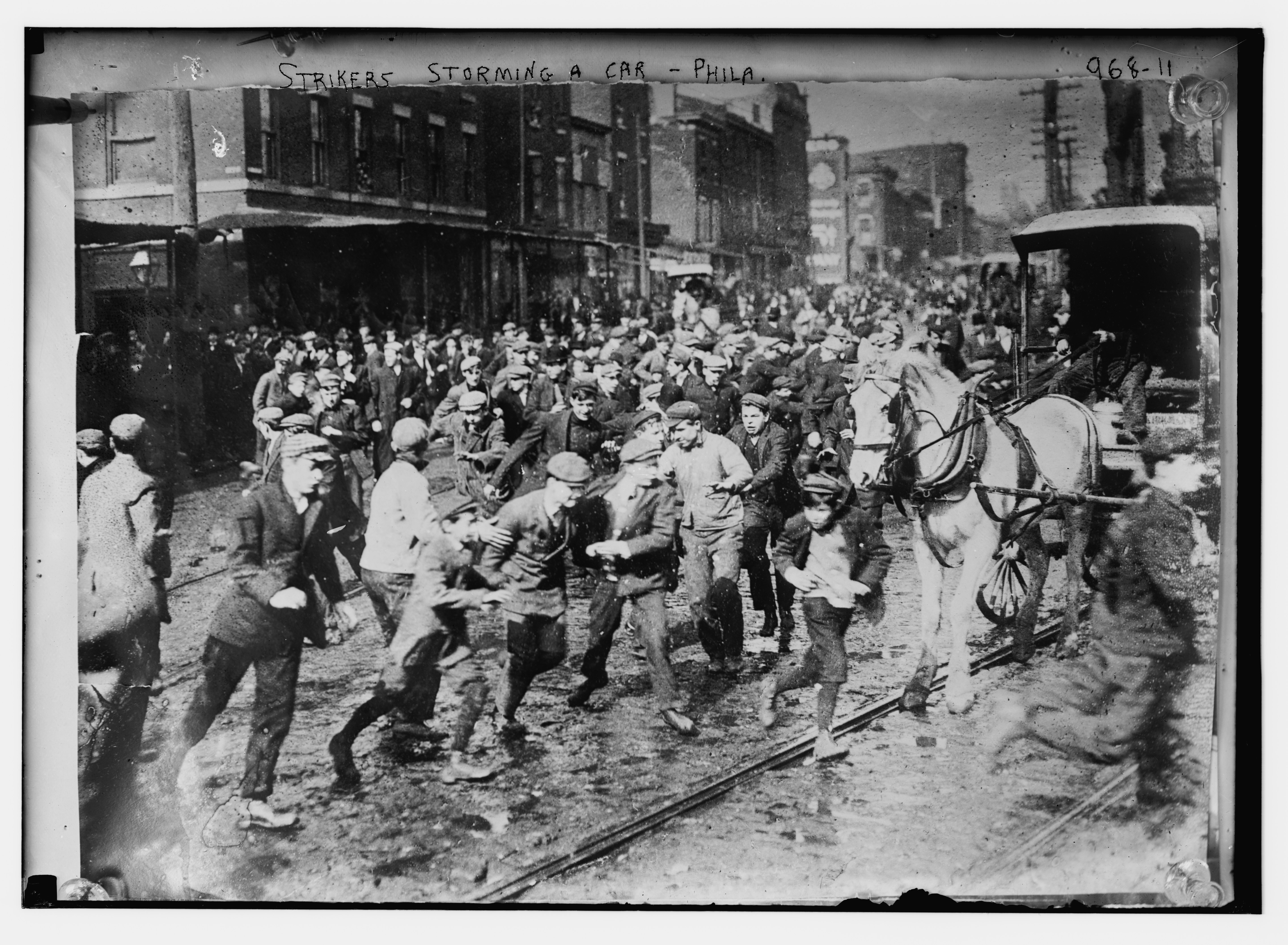
Strikers storming horse-drawn car.

With the union threatening a general strike to hobble the city if strike breakers were brought in, PRT brought in 600 strike breakers, while denying they had done so. Trolley workers in Trenton, sensing the moment, went on strike, shutting their transit company down with a strike that would later fuel the rise of the Central Labor Union.

The final straw for calling a general strike was the National Guard and the Pennsylvania Constabulary entering the city to provide protection for PRT's few remaining workers. Members of other unions throughout the city saw this as a clear signal that the city and state governments were uniting in favor of the companies against the unions. When the well-trained, heavily armed Constabulary failed to immediately restore order, there was talk of bringing in the United States Army or Navy.

With the general population, newspapers, retailers and religious groups uniting against PRT, a general strike was called. All unions in all industries were asked to walk out, in hopes of adding financial burden to the city and PRT.

As city commerce ground to a near halt, the general strike had wider impacts, leading to sympathy walkouts along the East Coast. The public was hungry for reform and vengeance on the hated industries who controlled transportation.

The union's "scorched earth, take no prisoners" approach eventually brought PRT to the negotiating table, ending the general strike while the trolley walk-out continued.

=== Women's auxiliary formed ===
In the face of a prolonged strike, PRT held to the common belief that workers could, in effect, be starved back to work. By the end of March, the general strike was called off. The wives, daughters and women friends of the striking car men set about organizing a woman's auxiliary of the car men's union to raise funds in support of the strike. The city's Director of Public Safety turned down their requests for parade permits. During the court hearing seeking to overturn the ruling, the auxiliary's organizer, when questioned about her politics, stated that she was not an anarchist, but a Socialist. She stated that there would be men in the parade, but only to hold babies and push strollers so that the women marchers would have their hands free to collect donations. The court ruled against the auxiliary and the refusal to issue the permit was not overturned.

The women's auxiliary went on to raise funds through a variety of sales, entertainment events and door-to-door solicitations, allowing the strikers to continue far longer than they could have afforded to otherwise.

== Aftermath ==
The trolley workers' strike presented a template for further action and served to empower similar unions to take to the streets. Eventually, the disgruntled riders managed to freeze trolley fares at 5 cents well beyond the fiscal pressures of most traction companies, ironically leading to severely under-funded transit systems and bankrupt rail lines.

== See also ==
- 1835 Philadelphia general strike
- Seattle General Strike
- List of US strikes by size
