= Francis Scott Key School =

- U.S. National Register of Historic Places
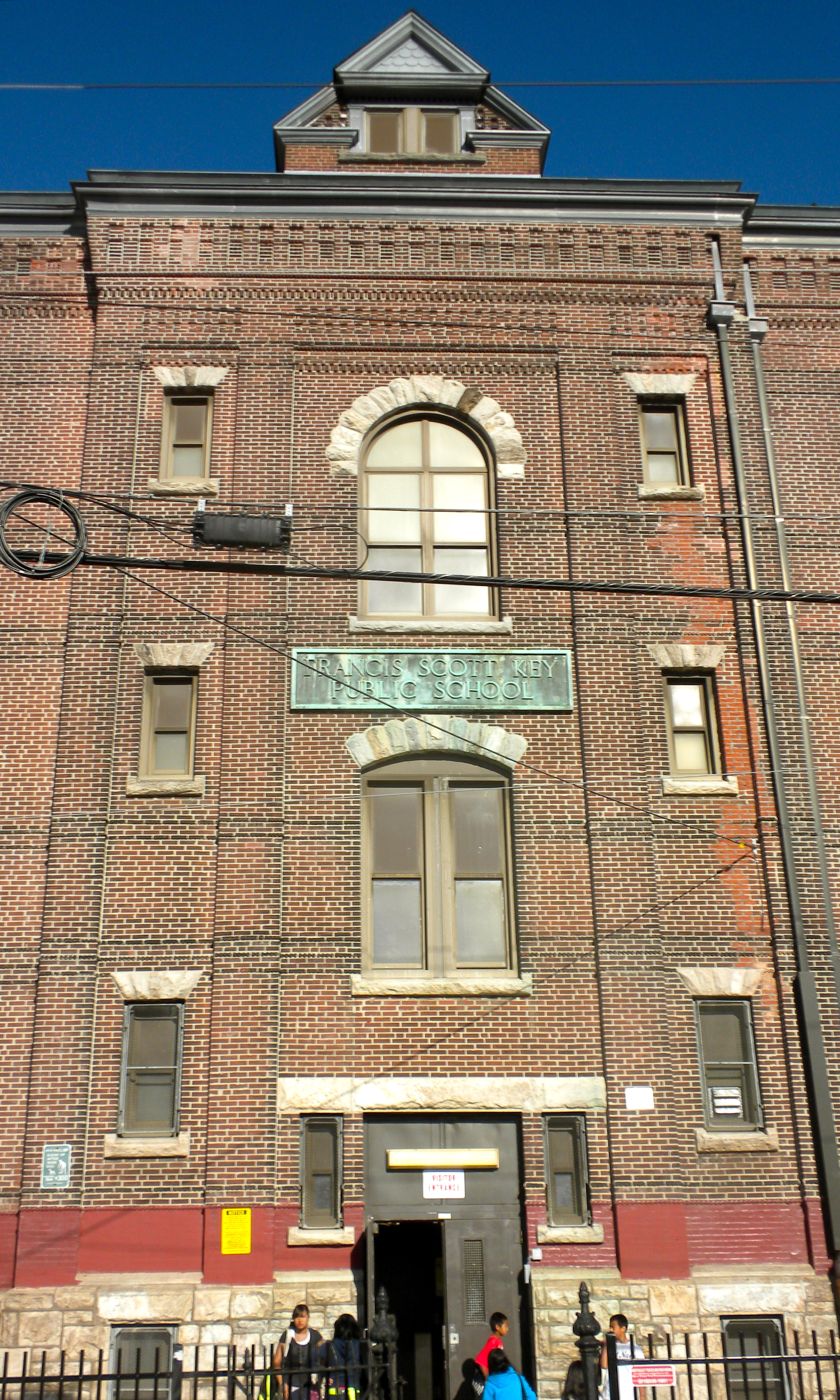
- Francis Scott Key School, May 2010

- Location within Philadelphia Location within Pennsylvania Location within the United States
- Location: 2226-2250 S. Eighth St., Philadelphia, Pennsylvania
- Coordinates: 39°55′16″N 75°09′37″W
- Area: 2 acres (0.81 ha)
- Built: 1889
- Built by: O`Neill, Charles, Jr.
- Architect: Anshutz, Joseph W.
- Architectural style: Late Victorian
- MPS: Philadelphia Public Schools TR
- NRHP reference No.: 86003296
- Added to NRHP: December 1, 1986

Francis Scott Key School is a public elementary school located in the Central South Philadelphia neighborhood of Philadelphia, Pennsylvania. It is a part of the School District of Philadelphia.

The historic school building was built in 1889, and is a three-story, eight-bay, brick building on a limestone base in the Late Victorian-style. It features a decorative brick corbel, small pedimented dormer, and three great flaring capped chimneys. It was named for American lawyer, author, and amateur poet Francis Scott Key (1779–1843).

It was added to the National Register of Historic Places in 1986.

Areas assigned to Key are assigned to Southwark School for grades 7–8. Students zoned to Southwark and to Key are also zoned to South Philadelphia High School.

== History ==
In 1988 over 75% of Key's students were under the poverty line.

Prior to 1989 Key was a K-8 school. In 1989 the district decided to move grades 6–8 to Southwark School in order to relieve overcrowding at area elementary schools, and in turn the high school program Southwark Motivation, on the third floor of Southwark, was to be moved to South Philadelphia High.

On June 10, 2015, an emergency notification was sent regarding asbestos found at Key. District spokesperson Fernando Gallard stated that the district had discovered the asbestos before the notification, sent by Philadelphia city controller Alan Butkovitz to officials, was sent out, and that the problem had been fixed.
