= Philadelphia Folklore Project =

American onprofit organization

- Formation: 1987
- Founder: Debora Kodish
- Founded at: Philadelphia, Pennsylvania
- Type: Nonprofit
- Tax ID no.: 23-2568080
- Purpose: Supporting the Arts
- Location: Philadelphia, Pennsylvania, United States
- Revenue: $375,853 (2020)
- Website: folkloreproject.org

The Philadelphia Folklore Project (PFP) is a non-profit organization advocating for and providing documentation, presentation, education, and collaborative research to folk and traditional arts across the Philadelphia region in service of social change. Founded in 1987 by folklorist Debora Kodish, PFP offers workshops and assistance to local artists and communities through organizing concerts, events, and exhibitions. Their driving philosophy is that "diversity and equity are central elements of thriving communities." One of a handful of independent folk and traditional arts nonprofits nationwide, the organization is widely regarded as a powerful instrument for socially conscious and anti-racist activism and serves as a model for sustaining living cultural heritage in the fields of applied folklore, ethnomusicology, and anthropology. It seeks to foster growth in communities through access to grant funding and artistic venues, but also material and social infrastructure in defense against gentrification and through cultivating positive inter-communal relationships.

PFP conducts field research into community-based arts, history, and culture, and maintains one of the largest archives on regional folklore in the city of Philadelphia, holding over 75,000 items and documents. The archive contains primary ethnographic sources and materials documenting community folklife, arts, culture, as well as the experiences and expressions of people in the Philadelphia region. Their archive also preserves PFP's administrative history, and materials from their exhibits, programs, documentary projects, and other initiatives.

== Artist Registry ==
The Philadelphia Folklore Project identifies and supports local folk artists and produces public programs advancing both them and folk traditions significant to Philadelphia communities. Created with the intention of better connecting local folk artists to their communities, PFP documents outstanding practitioners and practices through the maintenance of a database of artists and their work in the Philadelphia area. The database currently has over 100 artists in residency, helping to publicize their work and foster cultural growth in their communities.

Through years of advocacy and technical assistance, the Philadelphia Folklore Project has raised over $4 million for local artists and agencies. In many cases, this was the first outside funding to be invested in low-income communities of color.

== Films (Selection) ==
Over the course of its time, the Philadelphia Folklore Project has produced sixteen documentaries, many going on to win awards.

Eatala: A Life in Klezmer, a short documentary film produced by PFP in 2011, directed by Barry Dornfield and Debora Kodish, tells the story of the Hoffman family, and their continued tradition of playing Ukrainian-Jewish klezmer music in the city of Philadelphia. The film follows Elaine Hoffman Watts, Susan Watts, and their family legacy of playing Klezmer, having persisted for four generations and breaking through social barriers to help create a unique Philadelphia-style Jewish Klezmer sound.

Because of the War, is a film produced by PFP in 2016, documenting the story of members of the Liberian Women’s Chorus for Change and their experience of moving to Philadelphia after fleeing the Liberian Civil Wars (1989–2003). Through their use of traditional Liberian song and dance, the women portray their stories and work to inspire social change in their community.

La Ofrenda, is a documentary film produced by the Philadelphia Folklore Project that will be screening in 2021. Directed by Irving Viveros, La Ofrenda documents the altar-making practices within the Mexican community in the Philadelphia area, with artist César Viveros collecting the stories behind the altars of local community members.

== Podcasts ==
The organization has a podcast, Philly Folk, with the intent to dive into the history of the Philadelphia Folklore Project and how it operates today. The series curates a number of subjects, ranging from ongoing projects to broader topics and events with the intention of fostering social change through folklore.

In addition to its ongoing podcast, The Philadelphia Folklore Project has also released two limited series, La Ofrenda on 9th Street, and FolkAid: Healing and Healers.

== Programs ==
The Philadelphia Folklore Project regularly schedules and holds events meant to foster cultural awareness and education across a diverse set of communities in the region. It has advocated for and frequently raised money to help diverse and low-income communities, including co-founding the Folk Arts-Cultural Treasures Charter School alongside Asian Americans United. The project also hosts a number of classes, concerts, and workshops meant to connect community members with various folk arts and artists. In addition to these, PFP hosts communal seminars discussing issues facing many communities today, regarding topics such as cultural erasure, appropriation, and inclusion. The Philadelphia Folklore Project has released more than 50 publications and hosted over 280 events and 26 public ethnographic exhibitions. In response to a decline in funding for emerging local folk arts groups, PFP launched a new initiative: the Folk Arts and Social Change Residency. This initiative offers stipends to folk art groups as well as hands-on community-based folklife fieldwork in ethnography and how to use this to promote social change. These residencies document core communal values and traditions in an effort to create cross-generational cultural dialogue and education.
