= Southwark School =

- U.S. National Register of Historic Places
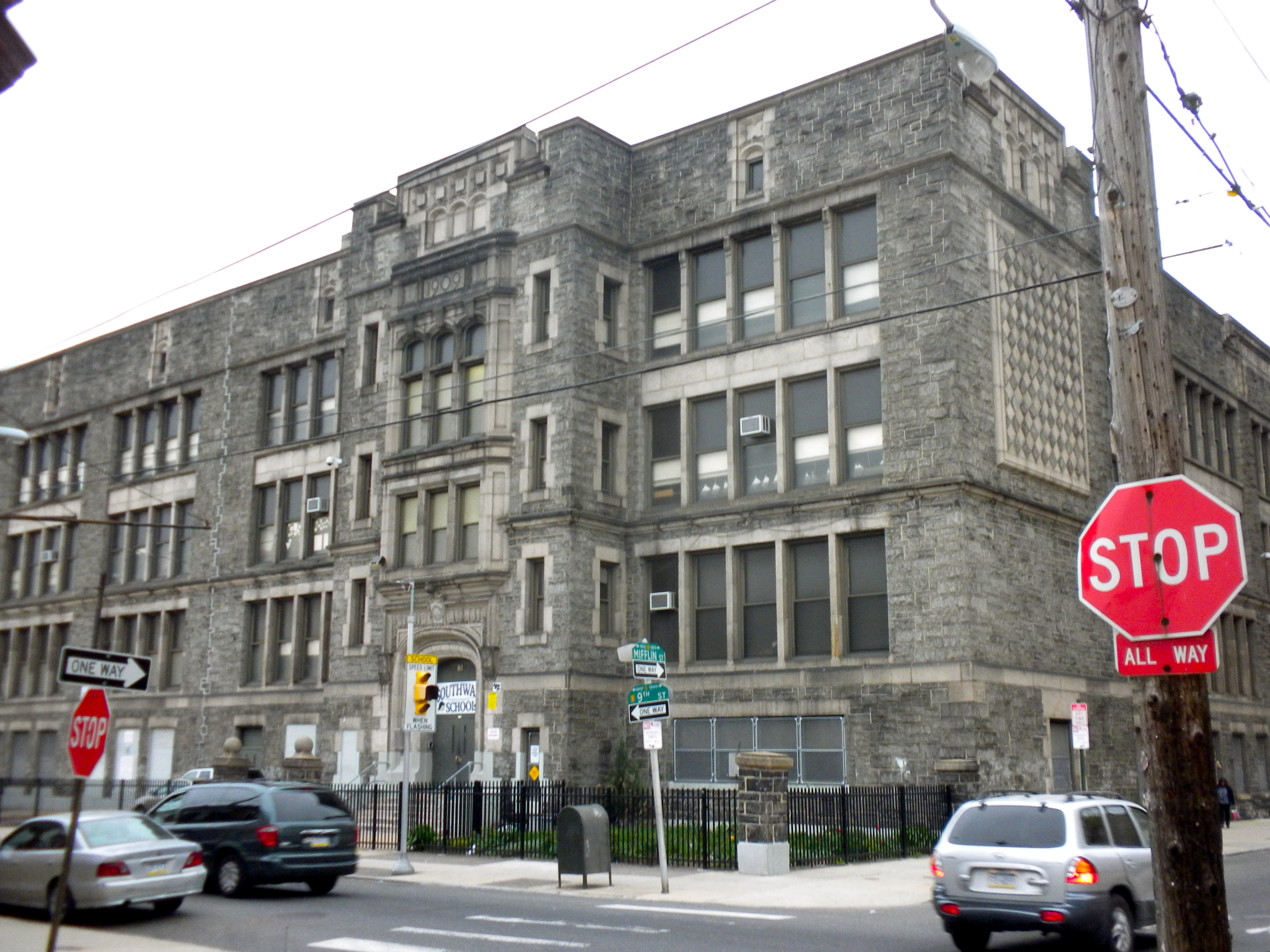
- Southwark School, April 2010

- Location within Philadelphia Location within Pennsylvania Location within the United States
- Location: 1835 S. 9th St., Philadelphia, Pennsylvania
- Coordinates: 39.9259°N 75.1604°W
- Area: 3 acres (1.2 ha)
- Built: 1909–1911
- Architect: Henry deCoursey Richards
- Architectural style: Jacobean
- MPS: Philadelphia Public Schools TR
- NRHP reference No.: 86003330
- Added to NRHP: December 1, 1986

Southwark School is a public K-8 school located in the Central South Philadelphia neighborhood of Philadelphia, Pennsylvania. It is a part of Philadelphia Public Schools.

Students zoned to Francis Scott Key School (K–6) are zoned to Southwark for grades 7–8. Students zoned to Southwark and to Key are also zoned to South Philadelphia High School.

== History ==
The historic school building was designed by Henry deCoursey Richards and built in 1909–1911 on the site of the old Philadelphia Quartz Mifflin Street plant. It is a three-story, granite-faced, reinforced concrete building in the Tudor Revival-style. It features a segmented, compound arched opening and parapet with stepped stone panels. The building was added to the National Register of Historic Places in 1986.

Construction of the school was interrupted by the general strike of 1910. Rioters pulled down portions of the construction and used the stones build bunkers and to block the trolley tracks. When trolleys driven by strikebreakers and guarded by armed police officers came down Mifflin Street, a mob of 1,500 citizens attacked with rocks and clubs. Both officers were knocked unconscious and an eight-year-old boy was struck in the head, killing him.

As of 1989 the Southwark Motivation, a high school program with 265 students, housed its classes on the third floor of Southwark School. Established by West Philadelphia High School teacher Rebecca Segal, it admitted students who perform at average levels and provided extra mathematics and English courses, required attendance of cultural events, used the same teachers all four years, and made parents sign contracts asking them to involve themselves in the education of their children. That year the district decided to move the program to South Philadelphia High School in order to use more space at the underutilized high school campus and to relieve overcrowding at South Philadelphia elementary schools. The third floor of Southwark would be used for grade 6-8 students who were attending Francis Scott Key School, and there would be space freed for a full-day kindergarten program. Several students and parents of Southwark Motivation criticized the plan.
