= Odunde Festival =

Street festival catering to African-American interests and the African Diaspora

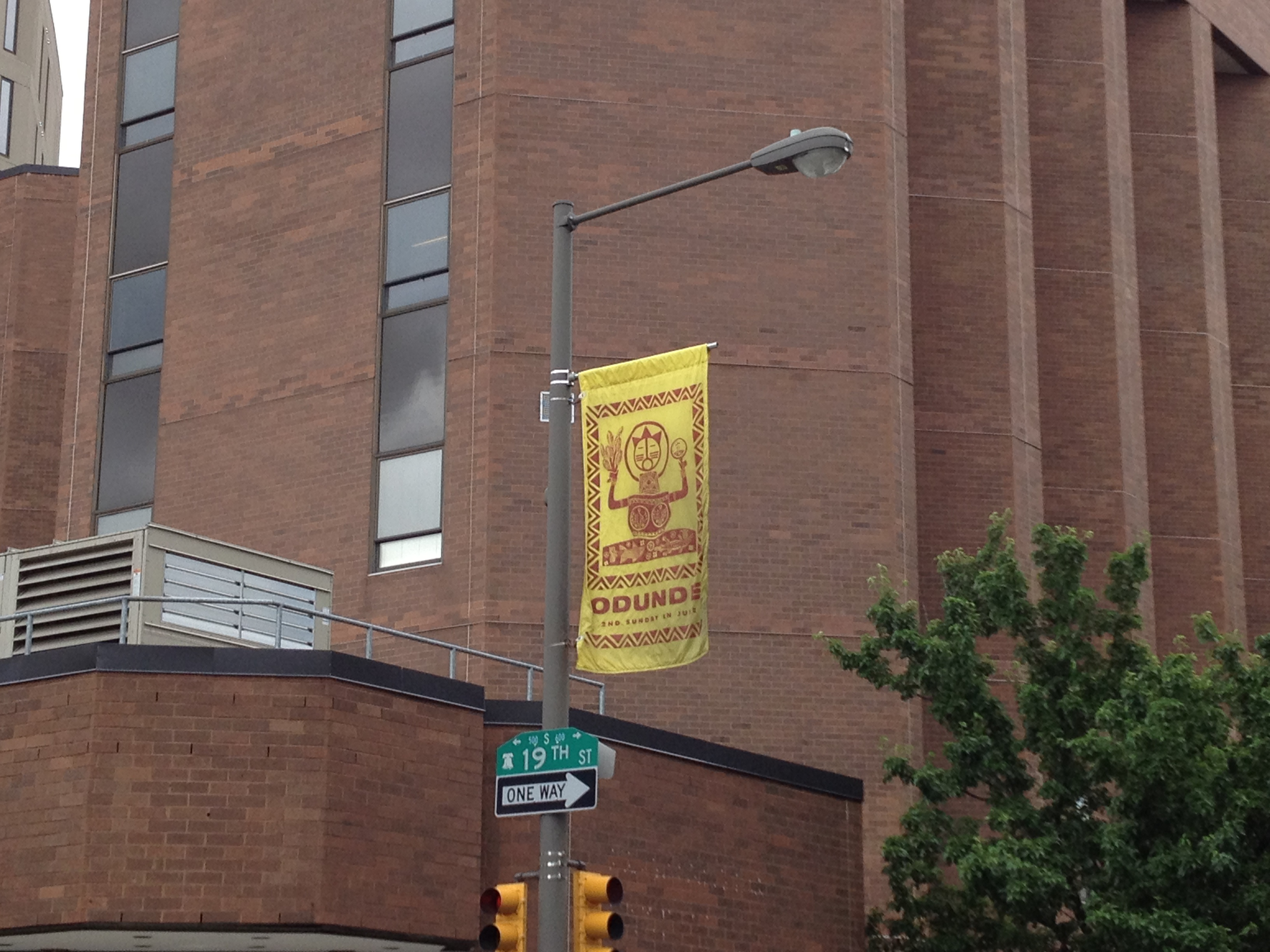
- Odunde Festival celebrated in Southwest Center City in Philadelphia
- Genre: Cultural and commercial festival
- Locations: Southwest Center City, Philadelphia, Pennsylvania
- Country: United States of America
- Inaugurated: 1975
- Most recent: 2026
- Attendance: 500,000
- Website: https://www.odundefestival.org/

The Odunde Festival is a one-day festival and street market catered to African-American interests and the African diaspora. It is derived from the tradition of the Yoruba people of Nigeria in celebration of the new year according to the Yoruba calendar or Kọ́jọ́dá, which usually falls on the first moon of June (Òkudù) on the Gregorian calendar. It is centered at the intersection of Grays Ferry Avenue and South Street in Southwest Center City, Philadelphia, Pennsylvania. It was co-founded by Ruth Arthur and Lois Fernandez.

== History ==
The Odunde festival started in Philadelphia in 1975. Lois Fernandez and her friend Ruth Arthur organized the first Odunde Festival. It took place in April 1975, as the "Oshun Festival". The goal was to bring together the community and to foster awareness of and pride in black history and culture. The festival began with $100 from neighborhood donations.

The festival is one of the largest African celebration on the east coast of the United States. It is held in the month of June. The Odunde festival brings in Africans from all parts of the world, including Africa, the Caribbean, and Brazil. According to WXPN, "... beginning with an all-inclusive spiritual procession to the Schuylkill River, the festival carries on from 10 a.m. to 8 p.m., filling the day with vibrant traditional clothing, African food, and art and craft vendors from around the world."

Ruth died at age 64 in 1997. While Lois died at age 81 in 2017.

There was no festival in 2020.

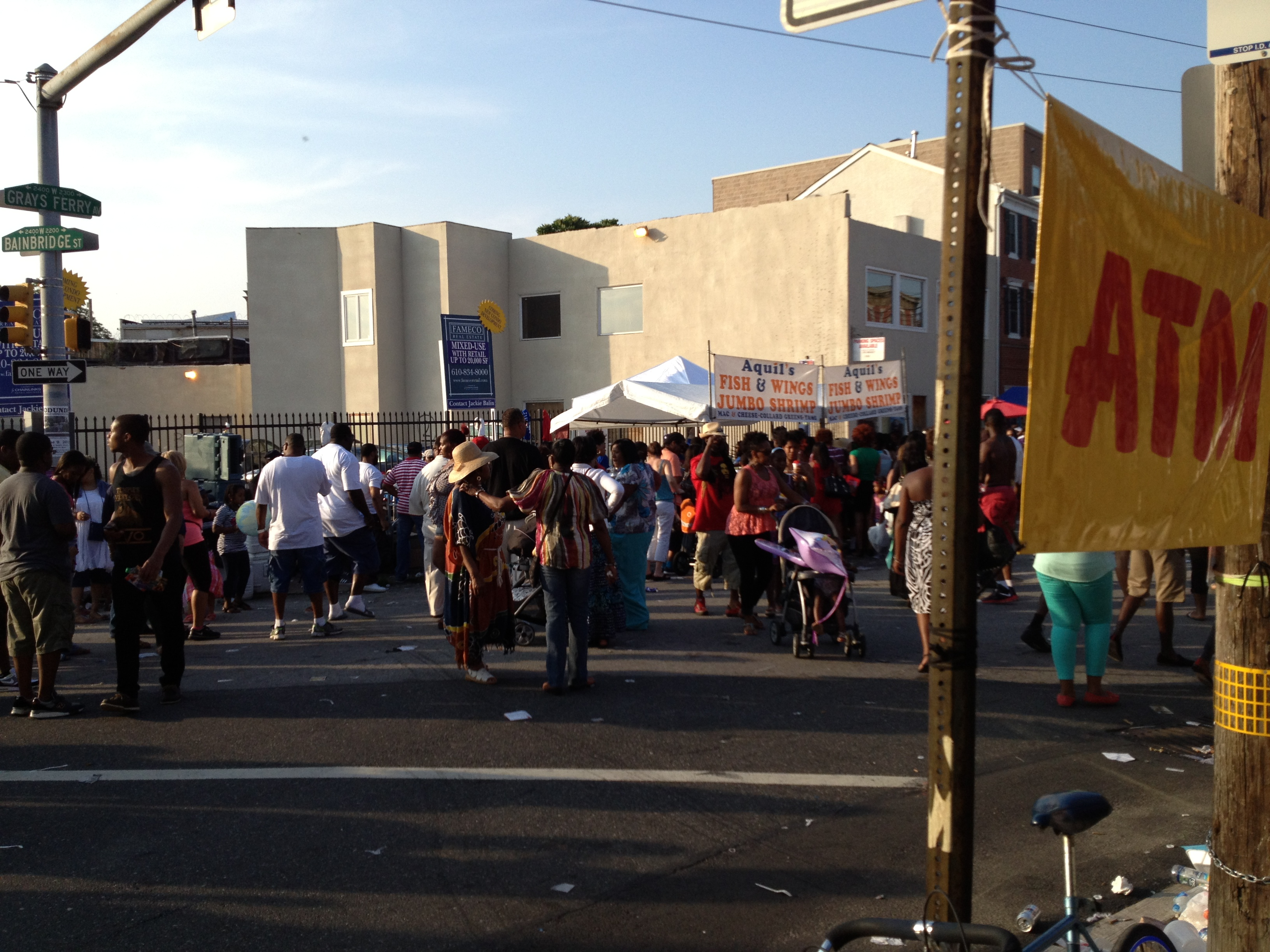
Odunde Festival 2013 on Grays Ferry Avenue

== See also ==
- African-American neighborhood
