= James R. Ludlow School =

- U.S. National Register of Historic Places
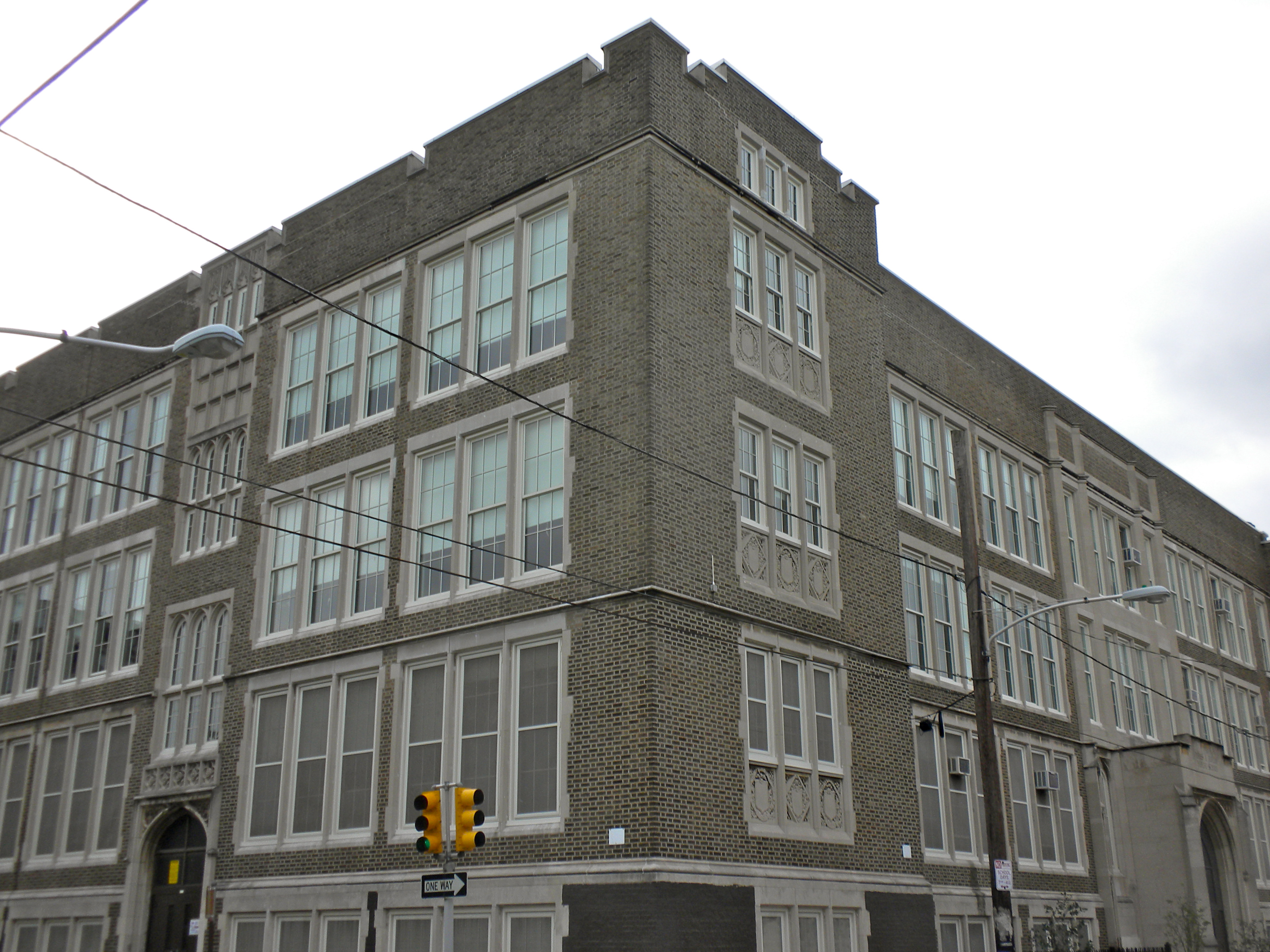
- James R. Ludlow School, August 2010

- Location within Philadelphia Location within Pennsylvania Location within the United States
- Location: 550 W. Master St., Philadelphia, Pennsylvania
- Coordinates: 39°58′21″N 75°08′45″W
- Area: 2 acres (0.81 ha)
- Built: 1926–1927
- Architect: Irwin T. Catharine
- Architectural style: Late Gothic Revival
- MPS: Philadelphia Public Schools TR
- NRHP reference No.: 88002296
- Added to NRHP: November 18, 1988

The James R. Ludlow School is a historic American K-8 elementary school in the Ludlow neighborhood of Philadelphia, Pennsylvania. It is in the School District of Philadelphia.

The building was added to the National Register of Historic Places in 1988. On January 22, 2025, Superintendent Tony Watlington, Sr., proposed a plan that would close Ludlow School and convey it to the City of Philadelphia as part of a plan to streamline the School District of Philadelphia's educational facilities. This plan was subsequently revised on April 20, 2026, to remove Ludlow from the list of school closures, although seventeen other schools remained on that list; this plan was then approved by the Board of Education on April 30 despite intense backlash.

== History and architectural features ==
The school building is a Gothic Revival structure that was designed by architect Irwin T. Catharine (1883–1944) and built between 1926 and 1927. It is a heavily constructed, three-story brick building, nine bays wide with projecting end bays, and was created in the Late Gothic Revival-style. Like many similarly-designed Gothic Revival schools in Philadelphia, it features rib vault, heavily tiled corridors, and a stone entrance pavilion with a Tudor-arched opening.

The school was named for the Honorable James Reilly Ludlow, or “Judge Ludlow” (1825-1886), president judge of the Court of Common Pleas, No. 3, in Philadelphia, Pennsylvania, and a graduate of the University of Pennsylvania.

Ludlow School is located near the National Shrine of St. John Neumann, and near Philadelphia’s up-and-coming Fishtown neighborhood. St. John Neumann was a Bishop of Philadelphia who largely organized and expanded Philadelphia's diocesan school system.
