= 2012 United States presidential election in New York =

- November 6, 2012
- Turnout: 59.2% (▼4.2 pp)

Nominee	Barack Obama	Mitt Romney
Party	Democratic	Republican
Alliance	Working Families	Conservative
Home state	Illinois	Massachusetts
Running mate	Joe Biden	Paul Ryan
Electoral vote	29	0
Popular vote	4,485,741	2,490,431
Percentage	63.35%	35.17%

Obama
40–50%
50–60%
60–70%
70–80%
80–90%
90–100%
Romney
40–50%
50–60%
60–70%
70–80%
80–90%
Tie
President before election
Barack Obama
Democratic
Elected President
Barack Obama
Democratic

The 2012 United States presidential election in New York took place on November 6, 2012, as part of the 2012 United States presidential election in which all 50 states plus the District of Columbia participated. Voters chose 29 electors to represent them in the Electoral College via a popular vote pitting incumbent Democratic President Barack Obama and his running mate, Vice President Joe Biden, against Republican challenger and former Massachusetts Governor Mitt Romney and his running mate, Congressman Paul Ryan.

Barack Obama carried the state of New York by a landslide margin, winning 63.35% of the vote to Mitt Romney's 35.17%. As in previous elections, the Democratic ticket easily won, for the most part due to racking up very large margins in New York City (which itself comprised over 40% of the state's population) and its metropolitan area. The city alone garnered Obama 1,995,241 votes (81.19% of its vote), and he carried all five boroughs, after losing Staten Island (Richmond County) in 2008. Putnam County, which McCain won in 2008, was the only county in the NYC metropolitan area that Obama lost to Romney. The rest of his votes mostly came from Albany, Buffalo, Ithaca, Rochester, Syracuse, and their respective metropolitan areas, giving him a solid 28.18% lead over Romney. Obama even won in many rural counties. The Republicans won only in some rural parts of upstate and western New York.

New York was 1 of only 6 states to swing in President Obama's favor from 2008 to 2012, giving him the largest percentage of the vote for any presidential candidate in the state since 1964 and the second largest Democratic vote share in the state in history (as well as third most in the state's entire history, behind Warren Harding in 1920 as well). Similar to New Jersey, some news outlets, such as The New York Times, have proposed that Obama's improved performance in these states – as opposed to worsened performances in areas like the Rust Belt – was due to his handling of Hurricane Sandy, which made landfall on October 29. Mayor of New York City Michael Bloomberg, a Republican-turned-Independent, endorsed Obama due to the federal government's handling of the hurricane.

As of the 2024 presidential election, this is the last time the Democratic nominee won the following counties: Cayuga, Cortland, Franklin, Madison, Niagara, Orange, Oswego, Otsego, Richmond (Staten Island), Seneca, St. Lawrence, Suffolk, Sullivan, Warren, and Washington. This is also the last presidential election in New York in which the Democratic nominee won more counties than the Republican nominee. In subsequent elections, despite Republicans winning more counties, they have been unable to break through the huge Democratic advantage in New York City and its suburbs, ensuring that the state has remained solidly blue.

== Primary elections ==
=== Democratic primary ===
Incumbent President Barack Obama ran uncontested in the Democratic primary, and it was therefore cancelled.

=== Republican primary ===
2012 New York Republican presidential primary
- April 24, 2012

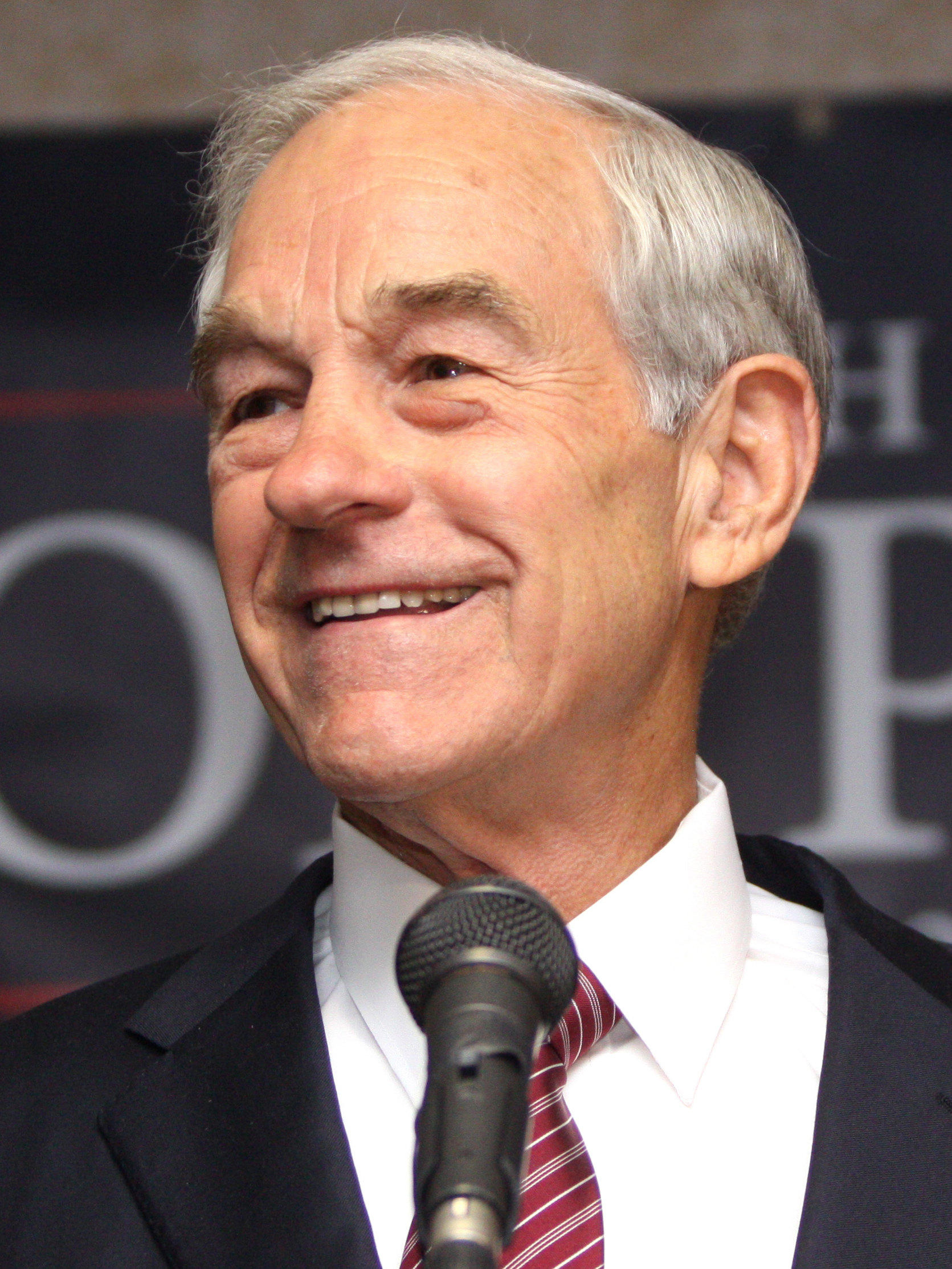

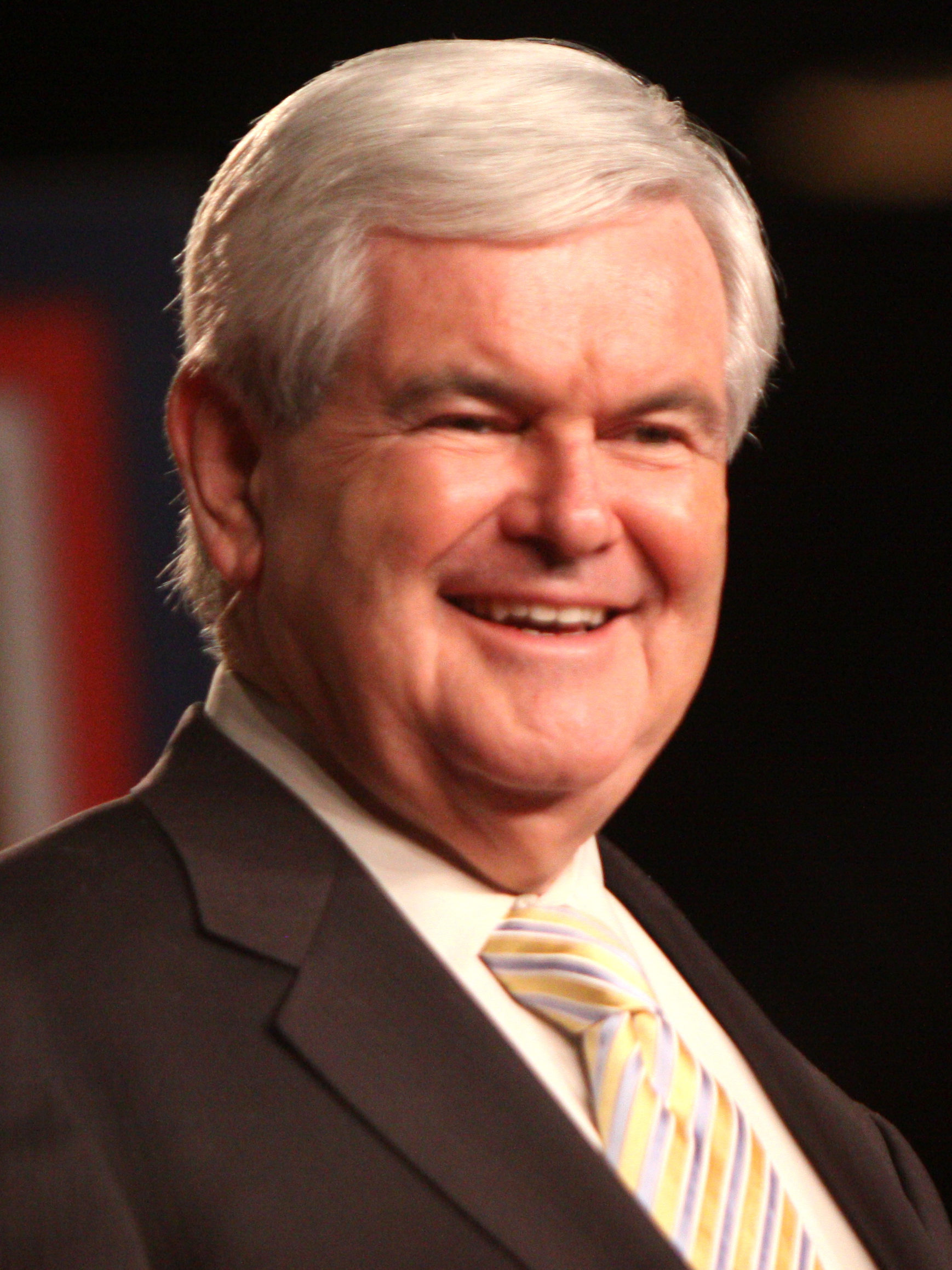

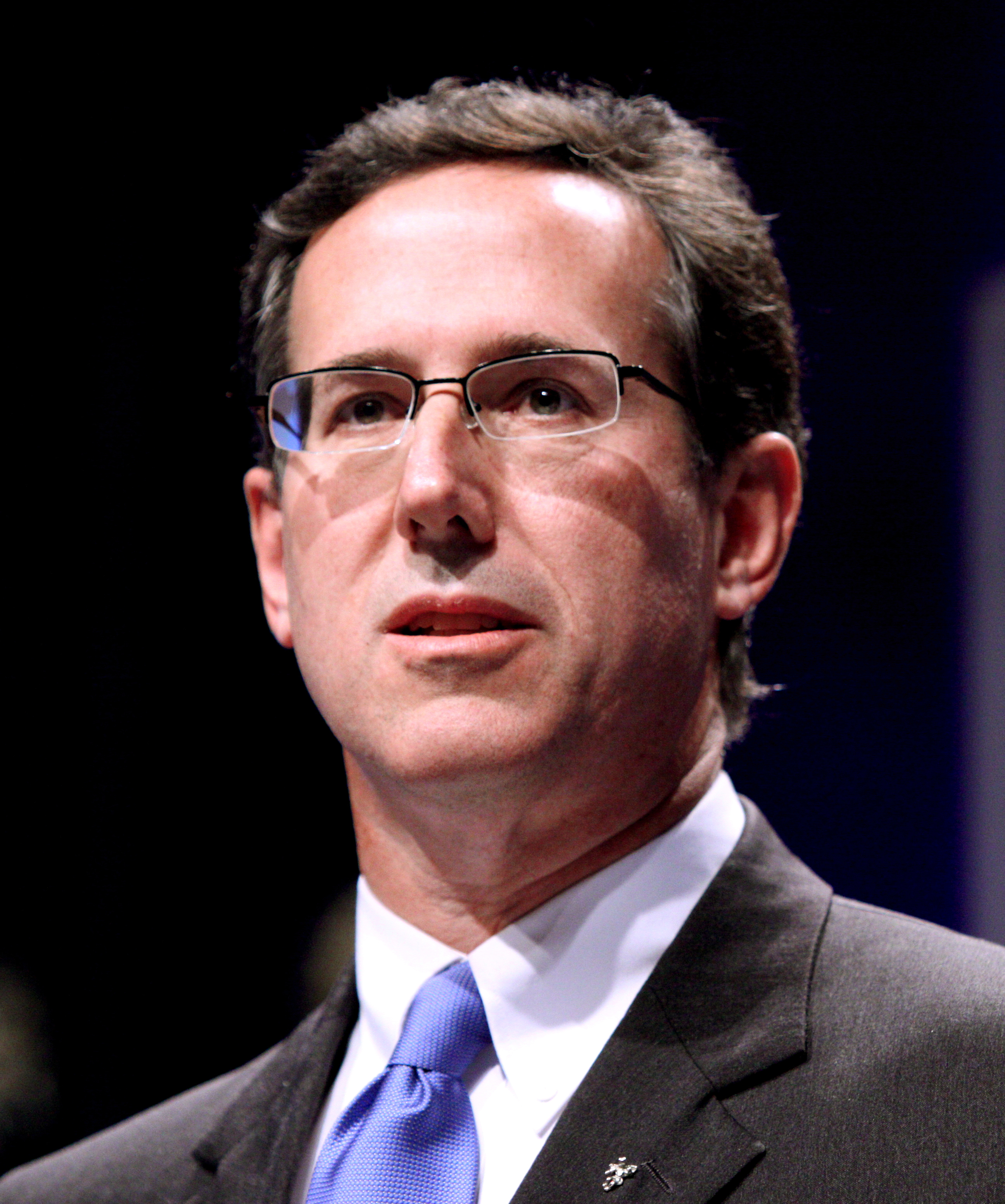
Candidate	Mitt Romney	Ron Paul
Home state	Massachusetts	Texas
Delegate count	92	0
Popular vote	118,912	27,699
Percentage	62.42%	14.54%
Candidate	Newt Gingrich	Rick Santorum
Home state	Georgia	Pennsylvania
Delegate count	0	0
Popular vote	23,990	18,997
Percentage	12.59%	9.97%
- County results Romney: 40–50% 50–60% 60–70% 70–80% (Note: Italicization indicates a withdrawn candidacy)

2012 New York Republican presidential primary
Candidate	Votes	Percentage	Projected delegate count		
Candidate	Votes	Percentage	AP	CNN	FOX
Mitt Romney	118,912	62.42%	92	92	
Ron Paul	27,699	14.54%	0	0	
Newt Gingrich	23,990	12.59%	1	0	
Rick Santorum (withdrawn)	18,997	9.97%	0	0	
Blank	810	0.43%	0	0	
Void	106	0.06%	0	0	
Scattering	1	0.00%	0	0	
Unprojected delegates:			2	3	95
Total:	190,515	100.00%	95	95	95

The 2012 New York Republican presidential primary took place on April 24, 2012.

By county, Romney won a plurality in every county, and a majority in all but six: Niagara, Cattaraugus, Wyoming, Orleans, Schuyler, Herkimer and Oswego.

Paul finished second in most counties. Santorum finished second in Otsego County. Gingrich finished second in two geographic areas: a cluster of counties in the Catskills and Hudson Valley (Orange, Rockland, Sullivan, and Westchester) and in most of the counties of Western New York (Allegany, Cattaraugus, Erie, Genesee, Niagara, and Wyoming), in addition to Herkimer and Oneida counties. Gingrich's relative strength in Western New York, as well as in Herkimer, can be attributed to the continued popularity and efforts of Carl Paladino, who carried those counties in the previous gubernatorial election and campaigned on Gingrich's behalf. The majority of New York politicians had endorsed Romney while the primary election was still competitive.

== General election ==
=== Predictions ===
Source	Ranking	As of
The Huffington Post	Safe D	November 6, 2012
CNN	Safe D	November 6, 2012
The New York Times	Safe D	November 6, 2012
The Washington Post'	Safe D	November 6, 2012
RealClearPolitics	Solid D	November 6, 2012
Sabato's Crystal Ball	Solid D	November 5, 2012
FiveThirtyEight	Solid D	November 6, 2012

=== Candidate ballot access ===
- Mitt Romney/Paul Ryan, Republican
- Barack Obama/Joe Biden, Democratic
- Gary Johnson/Jim Gray, Libertarian
- Jill Stein/Cheri Honkala, Green
- Virgil Goode/Jim Clymer, Constitution
- Peta Lindsay/Yari Osorio, Party for Socialism and Liberation

Write-in candidate access:

- Rocky Anderson/Luis J. Rodriguez, Justice

=== Results ===
2012 United States presidential election in New York
Party	Candidate	Running mate	Votes	Percentage	Electoral votes
Democratic	Barack Obama		4,337,622	61.25%	
Working Families	Barack Obama		148,119	2.09%	
Total	Barack Obama (incumbent)	Joe Biden (incumbent)	4,485,741	63.35%	29
Republican	Mitt Romney		2,228,060	31.46%	
Conservative	Mitt Romney		262,371	3.71%	
Total	Mitt Romney	Paul Ryan	2,490,431	35.17%	0
Libertarian	Gary Johnson	Jim Gray	47,256	0.67%	0
Green	Jill Stein	Cheri Honkala	39,982	0.56%	0
Write-ins	Write-ins		9,076	0.13%	0
Constitution	Virgil Goode	Jim Clymer	6,274	0.09%	0
Socialism and Liberation	Peta Lindsay	Yari Osorio	2,050	0.03%	0
Justice (write-in)	Rocky Anderson (write-in)	Luis J. Rodriguez	217	<0.01%	0
Freedom Socialist (write-in)	Stephen Durham	Christina López	34	<0.01%	0
America's (write-in)	Tom Hoefling	J. D. Ellis	34	<0.01%	0
Socialist Workers (write-in)	James Harris	Maura DeLuca	27	<0.01%	0
Socialist Equality (write-in)	Jerry White	Phyllis Scherrer	19	<0.01%	0
Twelve Visions (write-in)	Jill Reed	Tom Cary	12	<0.01%	0
American Third Position (write-in)	Merlin Miller	Virginia Abernethy	6	<0.01%	0
Totals			7,081,159	100.00%	29
Voter Turnout (Registered)					59.2%

==== New York City results ====
2012 presidential election in New York City		Manhattan	The Bronx	Brooklyn	Queens	Staten Island	Total	
Democratic- Working Families	Barack Obama	502,674	339,211	604,443	470,732	78,181	1,995,241	81.19%
Democratic- Working Families	Barack Obama	83.7%	91.45%	82.02%	79.08%	50.7%	1,995,241	81.19%
Republican- Conservative	Mitt Romney	89,559	29,967	124,551	118,589	74,223	436,889	17.78%
Republican- Conservative	Mitt Romney	14.92%	8.08%	16.9%	19.9%	48.14%	436,889	17.78%
Green	Jill Stein	3,241	648	3,616	2,121	457	10,083	0.4%
Green	Jill Stein	0.5%	0.1%	0.4%	0.35%	0.29%	10,083	0.4%
Libertarian	Gary Johnson	2,574	529	2,074	2,050	770	7,997	0.32%
Libertarian	Gary Johnson	0.69%	0.07%	0.3%	0.34%	0.49%	7,997	0.32%
Others	Others	2,243	583	2,298	1,753	549	7,426	0.29%
Others	Others	0.37%	0.16%	0.31%	0.29%	0.35%	7,426	0.29%
TOTAL		600,291	370,938	736,982	595,245	154,180	2,457,636	100.00%

==== By county ====
County	Barack Obama Democratic		Mitt Romney Republican		Various candidates Other parties		Margin		Total votes cast
County	#	%	#	%	#	%	#	%	Total votes cast
Albany	87,556	64.49%	45,064	33.19%	3,147	2.32%	42,492	31.30%	135,767
Allegany	6,139	36.21%	10,390	61.29%	424	2.50%	−4,251	−25.08%	16,953
Bronx	339,211	91.45%	29,967	8.08%	1,760	0.47%	309,244	83.37%	370,938
Broome	41,970	51.46%	37,641	46.15%	1,954	2.39%	4,329	5.31%	81,565
Cattaraugus	12,649	42.49%	16,569	55.66%	549	1.85%	−3,920	−13.17%	29,767
Cayuga	17,007	54.58%	13,454	43.18%	700	2.24%	3,553	11.40%	31,161
Chautauqua	23,812	45.05%	27,971	52.92%	1,069	2.03%	−4,159	−7.87%	52,852
Chemung	16,797	47.98%	17,612	50.31%	601	1.71%	−815	−2.33%	35,010
Chenango	9,116	47.20%	9,713	50.29%	485	2.51%	−597	−3.09%	19,314
Clinton	18,961	61.85%	11,115	36.26%	580	1.89%	7,846	25.59%	30,656
Columbia	16,221	55.69%	12,225	41.97%	683	2.34%	3,996	13.72%	29,129
Cortland	10,482	53.41%	8,695	44.31%	447	2.28%	1,787	9.10%	19,624
Delaware	8,304	44.55%	9,938	53.32%	396	2.13%	−1,634	−8.77%	18,638
Dutchess	65,312	52.80%	56,025	45.29%	2,368	1.91%	9,287	7.51%	123,705
Erie	237,356	57.31%	169,675	40.97%	7,164	1.72%	67,681	16.34%	414,195
Essex	9,784	58.53%	6,647	39.76%	286	1.71%	3,137	18.77%	16,717
Franklin	9,894	62.09%	5,740	36.02%	300	1.89%	4,154	26.07%	15,934
Fulton	8,607	43.47%	10,814	54.62%	378	1.91%	−2,207	−11.15%	19,799
Genesee	9,601	38.80%	14,607	59.03%	538	2.17%	−5,006	−20.23%	24,746
Greene	9,030	43.69%	11,174	54.06%	464	2.25%	−2,144	−10.37%	20,668
Hamilton	1,128	36.24%	1,932	62.06%	53	1.70%	−804	−25.82%	3,113
Herkimer	11,273	45.02%	13,282	53.04%	485	1.94%	−2,009	−8.02%	25,040
Jefferson	17,099	47.89%	18,122	50.75%	487	1.36%	−1,023	−2.86%	35,708
Kings	604,443	82.02%	124,551	16.90%	7,988	1.08%	479,892	65.12%	736,982
Lewis	4,724	44.90%	5,651	53.71%	147	1.39%	−927	−8.81%	10,522
Livingston	11,705	43.72%	14,448	53.97%	617	2.31%	−2,743	−10.25%	26,770
Madison	13,871	49.37%	13,622	48.49%	601	2.14%	249	0.88%	28,094
Monroe	193,501	57.97%	133,362	39.95%	6,950	2.08%	60,139	18.02%	333,813
Montgomery	8,493	46.70%	9,334	51.33%	359	1.97%	−841	−4.63%	18,186
Nassau	302,695	53.28%	259,308	45.64%	6,148	1.08%	43,387	7.64%	568,151
New York	502,674	83.74%	89,559	14.92%	8,058	1.34%	413,115	68.82%	600,291
Niagara	43,986	49.42%	43,240	48.58%	1,787	2.00%	746	0.84%	89,013
Oneida	40,468	46.68%	44,530	51.36%	1,702	1.96%	−4,062	−4.68%	86,700
Onondaga	122,254	59.72%	78,831	38.51%	3,632	1.77%	43,423	21.21%	204,717
Ontario	23,087	48.25%	23,820	49.78%	946	1.97%	−733	−1.53%	47,853
Orange	73,315	52.13%	65,367	46.48%	1,946	1.39%	7,948	5.65%	140,628
Orleans	5,787	39.35%	8,594	58.44%	325	2.21%	−2,807	−19.09%	14,706
Oswego	23,515	52.73%	19,980	44.81%	1,096	2.46%	3,535	7.92%	44,591
Otsego	12,117	50.20%	11,461	47.48%	561	2.32%	656	2.72%	24,139
Putnam	19,512	44.00%	24,083	54.31%	750	1.69%	−4,571	−10.31%	44,345
Queens	470,732	79.08%	118,589	19.92%	5,924	1.00%	352,143	59.16%	595,245
Rensselaer	37,408	54.96%	29,113	42.77%	1,540	2.27%	8,295	12.19%	68,061
Richmond	78,181	50.71%	74,223	48.14%	1,776	1.15%	3,958	2.57%	154,180
Rockland	65,793	52.78%	57,428	46.07%	1,424	1.15%	8,365	6.71%	124,645
Saratoga	52,957	50.19%	50,382	47.75%	2,171	2.06%	2,575	2.44%	105,510
Schenectady	36,844	56.74%	26,568	40.92%	1,521	2.34%	10,276	15.82%	64,933
Schoharie	5,427	41.09%	7,467	56.54%	313	2.37%	−2,040	−15.45%	13,207
Schuyler	3,674	45.10%	4,281	52.55%	191	2.35%	−607	−7.45%	8,146
Seneca	7,094	53.48%	5,889	44.39%	283	2.13%	1,205	9.09%	13,266
St. Lawrence	21,353	57.41%	15,138	40.70%	700	1.89%	6,215	16.71%	37,191
Steuben	15,787	40.97%	21,954	56.98%	790	2.05%	−6,167	−16.01%	38,531
Suffolk	304,079	51.17%	282,131	47.48%	8,056	1.35%	21,948	3.69%	594,266
Sullivan	15,268	53.73%	12,705	44.71%	442	1.56%	2,563	9.02%	28,415
Tioga	8,930	41.36%	12,117	56.13%	542	2.51%	−3,187	−14.77%	21,589
Tompkins	27,244	68.48%	11,107	27.92%	1,430	3.60%	16,137	40.56%	39,781
Ulster	47,752	59.97%	29,759	37.37%	2,115	2.66%	17,993	22.60%	79,626
Warren	14,806	50.06%	14,119	47.73%	653	2.21%	687	2.33%	29,578
Washington	11,523	49.89%	11,085	48.00%	487	2.11%	438	1.89%	23,095
Wayne	16,635	44.30%	20,060	53.43%	852	2.27%	−3,425	−9.13%	37,547
Westchester	240,785	61.99%	143,122	36.84%	4,540	1.17%	97,663	25.15%	388,447
Wyoming	5,661	34.66%	10,348	63.35%	326	1.99%	−4,687	−28.69%	16,335
Yates	4,488	47.53%	4,798	50.82%	156	1.65%	−310	−3.29%	9,442
Totals	4,485,877	63.35%	2,490,496	35.17%	105,163	1.49%	1,995,381	28.18%	7,081,536

See full list of sources See full list of sources

Counties that flipped from Democratic to Republican

- Chautauqua (county seat: Mayville)

Counties that flipped from Republican to Democratic

- Richmond (coterminous with Staten Island, a borough of New York City)

==== By congressional district ====
Obama swept 24 of the state's 27 congressional districts, including three held by Republicans.

District	Obama	Romney	Representative
1st	49.62%	49.08%	Tim Bishop
2nd	51.65%	47.23%	Peter T. King
3rd	50.76%	48.21%	Steve Israel
4th	56.31%	42.76%	Carolyn McCarthy
5th	90.6%	9.1%	Gregory Meeks
6th	67.8%	31.05%	Grace Meng
7th	88.35%	10.34%	Nydia Velázquez
8th	89.26%	10.14%	Hakeem Jeffries
9th	85.28%	13.84%	Yvette Clarke
10th	73.64%	25%	Jerry Nadler
11th	51.6%	47.32%	Michael Grimm
12th	76.92%	21.51%	Carolyn Maloney
13th	94.64%	4.56%	Charles B. Rangel
14th	80.67%	18.27%	Joe Crowley
15th	96.75%	3%	Jose Serrano
16th	73.69%	25.53%	Eliot Engel
17th	57.07%	41.84%	Nita Lowey
18th	51.43%	47.15%	Sean Patrick Maloney
19th	52.12%	45.85%	Chris Gibson
20th	59.2%	38.8%	Paul Tonko
21st	52.24%	46.07%	Bill Owens
22nd	48.76%	49.24%	Richard L. Hanna
23rd	48.38%	49.59%	Tom Reed
24th	57%	41.1%	Dan Maffei
25th	58.77%	39.41%	Louise Slaughter
26th	63.94%	34.31%	Brian Higgins
27th	42.89%	55.29%	Chris Collins

== Analysis ==
As expected, New York gave a landslide win to Obama, with 4,485,877 votes, or 63.35% of the popular vote, 28.18% lead ahead of Romney. It was one of only six states to swing in Obama's favor from 2008, when he won with a 26.85% margin. New York has voted solidly for the Democratic candidate in every election since Michael Dukakis in 1988, which marked the end of its status as a swing state. This was the greatest ever percentage of the vote won by a Democrat since Lyndon B. Johnson won 68.56% of the vote in his 1964 44-state landslide.

The politics of New York State are dominated by the heavily populated area of New York City, which Barack Obama won in a historic landslide, taking 81.19% of the vote and sweeping all 5 boroughs. Obama took 1,995,241 votes in New York City, to Mitt Romney's 436,889. No other presidential candidate of either party has ever received more than 80% of the vote in New York City, and this remains the only time since 2000 that a Democrat won Staten Island, as well as all five boroughs of New York City. This was not only due to its majority liberal and extremely diverse population. His performance in New York City likely contributed to his improvement from 2008, which was unusual compared to the rest of the country where he underperformed from 2008 (particularly in areas like the Midwest and Rust Belt).

He managed to flip Staten Island, which voted for John McCain in 2008, as well as improved his margins in all other boroughs except for Manhattan. This improved performance is likely attributable to Hurricane Sandy, which made landfall on October 29 and had devastating effects on the state, killing 44 people, destroying 250,000 vehicles and 300 homes, damaging 69,000 residential units, and flooding the New York City Subway, all tunnels within the city (except for the Lincoln Tunnel), and many suburban communities. Areas that weren't directly affected by the hurricane were indirectly effected by power outages and major disruption to data communication. Staten Island was hit hardest, with its geographical position combined with weather patterns, causing a 16 feet-high storm tide at its peak, flooding major residential areas. 23 of the 44 deaths from the hurricane were in Staten Island. The federal government's powerful and coordinated response to the hurricane was praised by those on both sides of the political aisle, garnering Mayor of New York City Michael Bloomberg's endorsement, as well as praise from Republican politicians like then New Jersey Governor Chris Christie. This – combined with the media's heavy criticism of Romney's support for a 40% budget cut to FEMA, which would grow to as much as 60% in the coming years – weakened Romney's performance amongst voters across city, including conservatives, especially in the borough of Staten Island.

The advantage from Hurricane Sandy was also reflected in polls. Prior to the storm, nine nationwide polls listed in Real Clear Politics' database found Romney and Obama each leading in four and one tied. Seven national polls taken after the storm had shown Obama leading in three, four being tied, and Romney leading in none. In particular, a poll by Politico and George Washington University found Obama's lead increasing in the Northeast from 8 to 20% before and after the storm.

Unlike many rural areas across the country, most notably in the Midwest, rural counties didn't swing especially hard against Obama this election. Most of the political landscape looked roughly the same, with the exception of Chautauqua County flipping red after supporting Obama by a narrow margin in 2008. However, Obama tied with Romney for white voters (who make up a majority of upstate's population but a minority in New York City) according to New York Times exit polls, a significant decline from 2008 when he won white voters 52 to 46. Discounting New York City's votes, Obama still would have carried New York State, albeit by a closer margin. Excluding New York City, Obama's vote total in the state was 2,490,636 to Romney's 2,053,607, giving Obama a 54.03%–44.54% win outside of NYC.

In terms of exit polls, Obama performed roughly as expected. He won both women and men 68 to 31 and 58 to 42, respectively, and won Black voters 94 to 5 and Hispanic voters 89 to 11. These ethnic groups collectively make up 54.6% of New York City's population, and thus hold great influence in state elections. Obama won all age groups, education levels, and income levels, though he did best amongst 18- to 29-year-olds (72 to 25), those with no college degree (66 to 34), and those with an income under $30,000 (81 to 17), respectively. Obama not only won liberals and registered Democrats, but he also won moderates and independents 63 to 36 and 50 to 44 respectively – these groups make up 42% and 23% of the electorate and were thus vital for Obama to win.

== See also ==
- United States presidential elections in New York
- 2012 Republican Party presidential debates and forums
- 2012 Republican Party presidential primaries
- Results of the 2012 Republican Party presidential primaries
- New York Republican Party
