= African American History, School District of Philadelphia =

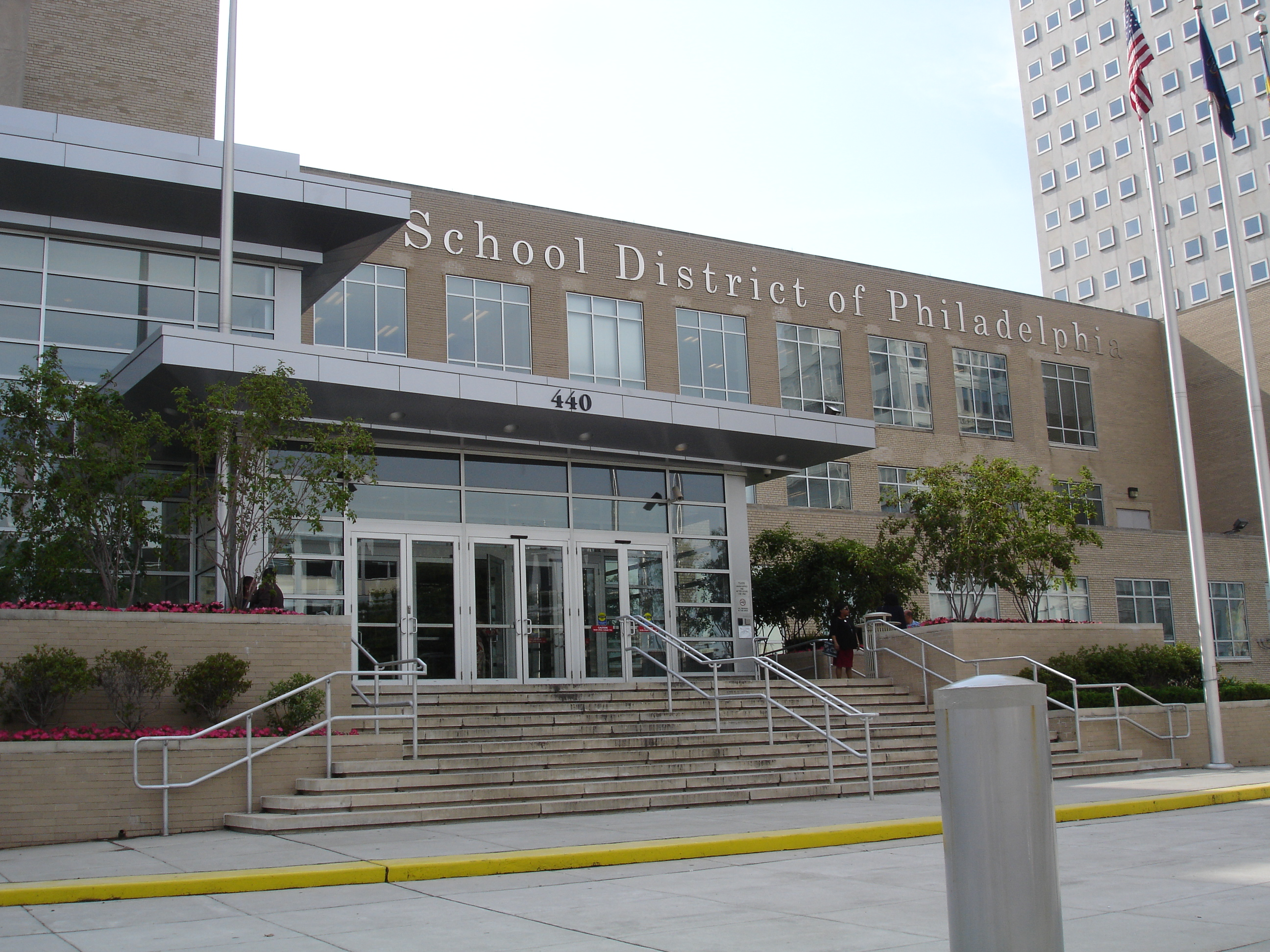
School District of Philadelphia Building

All students attending the School District of Philadelphia are required to take African American History to graduate. This requirement has been in place since 2005. It was the first major city to require African American History as a requirement for high school graduation.

== History ==
=== 1967 protests ===
In 1967, the School District of Philadelphia was segregated. The schools that African American students were attending had inadequate resources. From November 10, 1967, to November 22, 1967, students in Philadelphia protested in solidarity with African American students in the district for various demands. These demands encompassed having courses focused on African American history, having greater numbers of African American teachers and administrators, being able to wear traditional African clothing to school, and being exempt from saying the pledge of allegiance, overall the students had up to 25 demands. Black students associations were forming around the city. On November 17, 1967, a protest at the Board of Education building took place; Over 5,000 people had come to protest nonviolently. The Police Commissioner, Frank Rizzo, got a call from the Civil Disobedience Squad, previously the only force present at the rally, to help out. He brought 300 to 400 police officers. Unclear interactions occurred between the police officers and the protestors. At one point, Rizzo told the police officers to “get their black asses.” At the demonstration, 57 people were arrested and 15 of the protestors were hospitalized. Following the event, 800 African American community leaders called for a boycott on the schools. Another rally was held on November 22, 1967, calling for Rizzo to resign. A committee called the Ad Hoc Committee for the Infusion of African and Afro-American Heritage, resulted from the activism; it was able to make recommendations that would be used within the school district. It also helped to create culturally relevant curriculum. However, when Rizzo was later elected mayor, he tried to prevent African American studies from being in the curriculum in the school district.

=== Becoming a requirement ===
In 2005, the school district had 185,000 students. 65% of these students were African American students. Community members were calling for African American history to be a requirement for graduation at the public high schools in Philadelphia. The School Reform Commission of the school district voted unanimously for African American history to be a requirement. Starting in the fall of 2005, the course has been a requirement for all students in the district.

== Course outline ==
According to the School District of Philadelphia's website, the course outline is

- The Journey: Africana-American Studies in Philadelphia
- Teaching and Studying the Africana(a) Experience: Definitions and Categories
  - Africana Studies: A System for Studying African People, Places and Culture
  - Categories of Human Institutions
    - Social Structures
    - Governance
    - Ways of Knowing/System of Thought
    - Science and Technology
    - Movement and Memory
    - Cultural Meaning-Making Systems
  - Using the Conceptual Chart
    - Concept Chart and Organizer
  - Format of Lessons in Lessons in Africana Studies
  - Textbooks on African-American History: A Sketch Genealogy
  - Bibliography
- Dimensions of African Studies: Gender
  - Background

The textbook accompanying the class is The African American Odyssey written by Darline Hine. The course starts out teaching classical African civilizations, prior to colonialism and into colonialism, and includes units on civil rights and black nationalism. Additionally, slavery and the Civil War are studied. Economic development of African Americans throughout the 20th and 21st centuries are discussed, too. The course studies African American leaders throughout history that are often not given much emphasis in United States history courses. Many teachers teach the course using primary sources in addition to using the textbook.

== Response ==
The response to the course has been mixed. There are some proponents of the course who believe that this an opportunity to include African American history that is so often left out of traditional mainstream textbooks and US history courses. Some others are critical of having the course as a requirement, worrying that it will polarize students, since courses such as Asian American History and Mexican American History are not required.

Certain teachers have been more eager than others to teach it; while some are passionate about teaching it, others do not feel capable of teaching it, saying they do not have the knowledge base for it.

Some African American students have reported feeling that their self-esteem has been raised by the class. However, some students feel that the class has shortcomings; they say that it is pretty similar to a typical US history course, and that critical conversations about race are generally absent from class. The class does not always relate the topics of the course to issues related to race and racism that are present today. Some students praise the course because it adds representation in an otherwise fairly Euro-centric curriculum.
