= 1967 Philadelphia student demonstration =

- Date: November 17, 1967
- Location: Philadelphia, Pennsylvania, U.S. 39°57′32″N 75°10′32″W

Parties
Black students & protesters	Philadelphia Police Department

Lead figures
Student leaders, Al Hampton, Scarlett Harvey and Jenneifer Sporowal of the African American Student Society	Frank Rizzo

Number
approx. 3,500	approx. 400

Casualties
- Arrested: 57

The 1967 Philadelphia School Board Public Demonstration im Philadelphia was similar to the Chicago Public School Board Demonstration and the subsequent police riot, which took place on November 17, 1967, in Philadelphia, was just one in a series of marches organized in various cities across the United States with the assistance of the Student NonViolent Committee (SNCC).

The Student Action Committee (SAC) was in negotiations with the then school public Superintendent Mark Shedd and his adistant Julie Cromartie, some three years before the advent of the planned demonstration on the sunny morning of November 17, 1967, as the Philadelphia Public School Board Demonstration.

The Student Action Committee (SAC) in union with two major civil rights organizations, one headed by Bill Mathis, Chair of the Congress of Racial Equality (CORE) and the other, the Philadelphia Student NonViolent Coordinating Committee (SNCC) headed by Fred Mealy. Under black students of the Student Action Committee (SAC), Al Hampton, Scarlet Harvey, Jennefer Sprowalled, the entire demonstration and negotiations was arranged with Philadelphia Public School Representatives.

The citywide operation of the Student Action Committee group organizanizing black, white middle, high school and college and Catholic school students moved its forces to the Board of Education building on Benjamin Franklin Parkway. The students demanded an end to the tracking system holding Black students back from attending college and other opportunities, police out of public schools, up to date books, better school conditions, such as water fountain repairs and filtering and more Black school instructors. However, the protest was attacked by almost 400 Philadelphia Police Department (PPD) officers wielding clubs, led by Commissioner Frank Rizzo; the violent dispersal of the protest would lead to at least two civil lawsuits alleging the use of excessive force, one placed by the attacked students and the other placed by the attacked adults in the event.

The Philadeladelphia demonstration was part of a larger trend of student demonstrations and in the United States during the 1960s and early 1970s stemming from the closure of public schools to African American student attendance in at least one state in the southern United States of the latter 1950s.

Several small segregationist, separatist, White Nationalist groups had demonstrated at the Philadelphia School Board regularly in opposition to integration of the schools.

== Prelude ==
=== Student-led demands ===
Despite forming the majority of students in the public school system, there were few Black school officials. (Note: Two of the nine members of the governing Board of Education were Black: Henry H. Nichols and George Hutt. In addition, the Executive Deputy Superintendent was Black: Robert Poindexter.) A number of demands had been presented to school administrators attending meetings held at the Church and World Institute on North Broad Street. Lack of action after those discussions with the school board prompted the November demonstration. The student-run and organized Central Coordinating Committee (CCC) demanded better public schools for all students in Philadelphia, especially African-Americans, and an end to tracking and the forced vocational education system which affected African-American students at that time. The issue of ending vocational tracking and other situations drew supporters from all areas of the city of Philadelphia.

In addition, the students wanted to openly embrace their African roots by wearing appropriate clothing and natural hairstyles. Other demands included the removal of uniformed police officers from public schools, and the addition of African-American studies to the curriculum. Also, the draft and the need for counselors of the students' draft problems was held as a demand. Cecil B. Moore supported the students' demands during his unsuccessful 1967 campaign for Mayor of Philadelphia. Philadelphia public school Superintendent Marc Shedd had previously allowed Moore to campaign directly in local high schools; Moore regularly ridiculed Rizzo, a high school dropout: "You kids stay in school or you may wind up as police commissioner."

The CCC had been negotiating with Superintendent Shedd, who was known as a reformer, for at least a year before the demonstration. The CCC also met with white students and community organizers such as Walt Palmer to draft a student bill of rights; with a draft in hand, students made plans to present their bill of rights to the Board of Education on November 17, 1967. Shedd later met with student leaders and formed an impression that only three hundred students would show up.

=== Organizers ===
The demonstration was led and planned, organized, and operationalized, in part, by the CCC. The main in-high-school-local-teams planning the demonstration and engaged as the prime leadership was the African American Student Society (AASS) posted out of Gratz High School and Gillespie Junior High School, respectively. Germantown High School had a very active presentation and was a part of the AASS, which with student assistance, debated the difference between becoming a student union or a student association.

The Student Action Committee (SAC) was another organizing force behind the demonstrations. It was made up of high school students from various schools, public and religious, across Philadelphia. SAC met for at least three years before the demonstration, and published and distributed a student-run newsletter. SAC was active in a number of demonstrations in that period, such as the Philadelphia Post Office demonstration to demand hiring of African-Americans on an equal basis, the Girard College integration marches, various marches connected to the Civil Rights Movement as well as a number of anti-war marches.

Members of SAC were also active with the Student Nonviolent Coordinating Committee and the Congress of Racial Equality, which had offices in south and north Philadelphia, respectively.

=== Gratz and Bok ===
At lunchtime on October 26, 1967, approximately 300 students at Gratz High School walked out, carrying signs asking for greater Black representation on the School Board. A similar number of students also walked out at Bok Technical High School. District officials praised their actions as "real social studies in action".

A dozen students held a day-long demonstration at Bok Technical High School on November 10, 1967, demanding a course be offered in African-American history; in response, the school's administrators threatened to expel the students. Leaders in the African-American community picketed the high schools with predominantly Black enrollment (Note: These were South Philadelphia, William Penn, Gratz, Bartram, Bok, West Philadelphia, Benjamin Franklin, and Edison.) on November 16, encouraging students to attend a "Black Student Rally" to support the Bok students, who were rumored to have been suspended, at the Board of Education the next day. It was later clarified the twelve Bok students were told not to return to school until they brought a parent with them.

== Student strike and police response ==
=== Assembly and negotiation ===
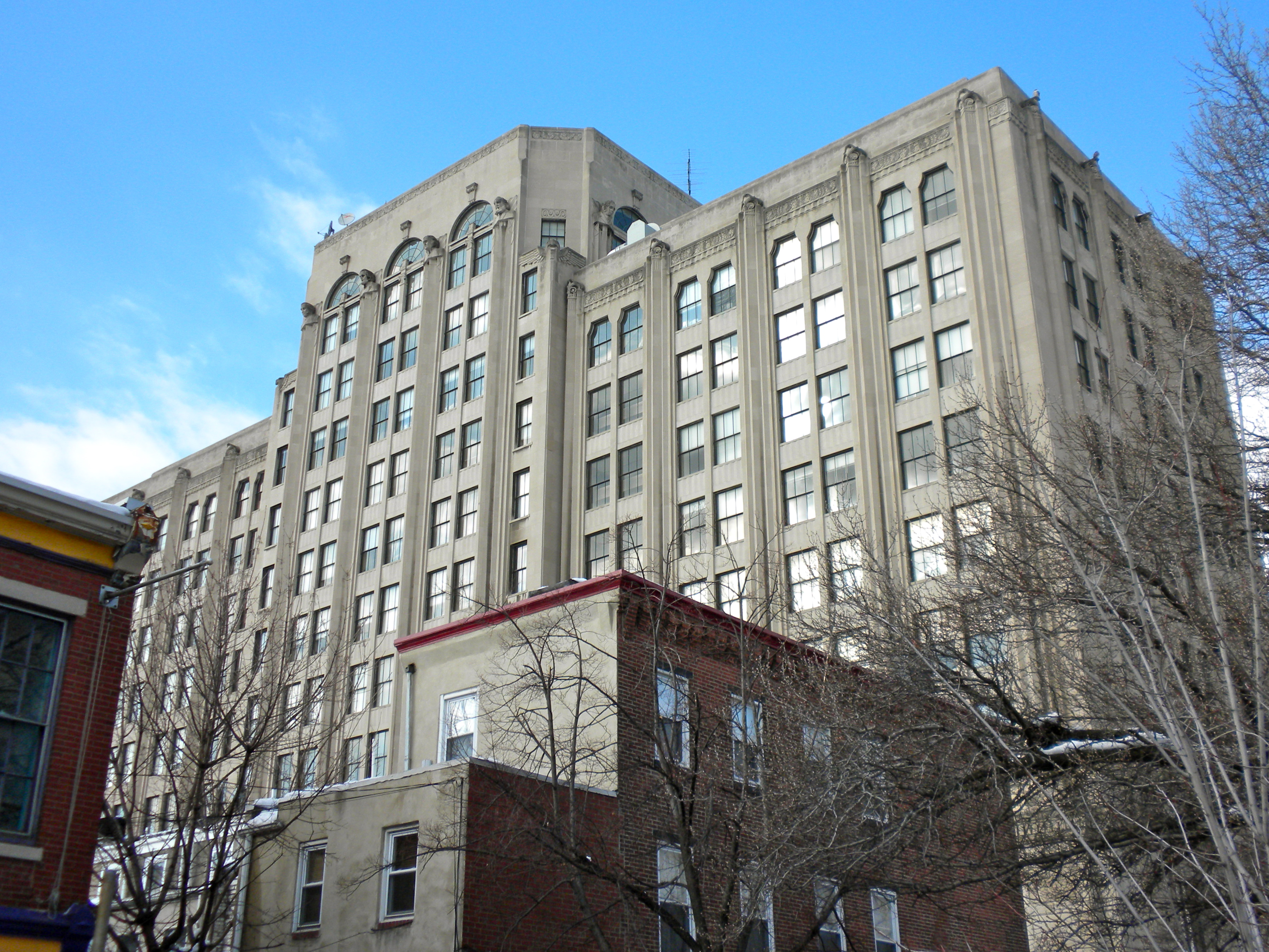
The Philadelphia Board of Education building in 2010

On November 17, 1967, by police count, 3,500 students in total did not attend classes and assembled around the Board of Education building at 21st and the Parkway. The demonstrators included youth groups, Catholic high school students, public junior high and high school students. School administrators had anticipated only 350 demonstrators. Student organizers disputed the police count, stating there were many more students present than the police projected, and, interestingly, most of the photos and video of the demonstration are missing from a number of archives. Up to 10,000 students were prevented from attending the demonstration by action of school administrators and police activity locking school doors, turning students away from the demonstration, and picking up and holding students through the afternoon. Superintendent Shedd had instructed principals to not encourage students to attend the rally, but the principals were also not to prevent students from attending.

Students began gathering at the Board of Education building starting at approximately 9 AM. A small group of students and adult community leaders were admitted to negotiate directly with Superintendent Shedd and the Board of Education, led by Board President Richardson Dilworth; eventually, the Board agreed to each demand and the news was shouted from a window to the crowd below. The mood was characterized by Palmer as one of "hope, energy, and possibility that must never be forgotten" and the Philadelphia Bulletin likened it to "a picnic". The crowd grew visibly and audibly with the arrival of approximately 900 students from Benjamin Franklin and William Penn high schools, who were chanting "Black Power!" repeatedly.

=== Rizzo arrives ===
At approximately 11 AM, a car was damaged when two students climbed onto its roof; the increased size and noise of the crowd intimidated PPD Lt. George Fencl, who was onsite leading a small squad of plainclothes officers in the Civil Disobedience Unit, and he requested police assistance at approximately 11:30. Acting PPD Commissioner Frank Rizzo, who was overseeing swearing-in ceremonies for 111 new officers at City Hall seven blocks away, responded by loading the new officers in buses and speeding to the scene. Rizzo, who assumed command just before 12 PM, arranged the police forces across Twenty-first from the crowd, which he later characterized as "a howling, undisciplied and disorganized mob".

According to the police, the demonstrators began throwing rocks and bottles at the police, an assertion which was disputed by students, school administrators, and bystanders at the scene. In the opinion written dismissing a subsequent lawsuit, a panel of three judges stated those witnesses "were inside the building without a full view of the noise and conditions" of the crowd and gave greater weight to the testimony of Commissioner Rizzo and others who said missiles had been thrown at the police. Shedd sent Fred Holliday, a Black school administrator, to ask the police to distance themselves from the crowd. Holliday was thrown to the ground by a police officer, tearing his coat; (Note: Rizzo reportedly said, when Holliday showed him the damage, "I have a tailor in South Philadelphia. I'll give you his name.") later, Board Vice President Henry Nichols convinced Rizzo to surrender his club.

=== Melee ===
Commissioner Rizzo later testified that two policemen, who were arresting a prisoner, had been knocked to the ground, prompting him to order more than 100 officers to their rescue at approximately 12:30 PM. Witnesses said Rizzo told his officers to "Get their Black asses!" Although Rizzo denied saying that phrase, local news anchor Larry Kane showed him film proving he had; Kane later recalled that Rizzo "said, 'Oh, my goodness, did I do that?' He was embarrassed. He was very rarely embarrassed."

They just beat the s— out of those kids who offered no resistance. It was a real stampede. I had seen police brutality before but never at this level. I saw two cops holding a kid while the third hit him over the head. I saw a cop break his billy stick over a kid's shoulder. They were really pounding the s— out of them. It was totally unnecessary and really bloody. Rizzo just couldn't keep his finger off the trigger. He started a police riot. There's absolutely no doubt about it.

— Richard de Lone, assistant to Shedd

Regardless of the actual precipitating event, the encounter quickly turned violent. The police started by beating a female student and an Episcopal priest who was trying to protect protesters. Students provided virtually no resistance to the police and fled down Twenty-first and Twenty-second streets. Contemporary news coverage characterized the protesters as violent and unruly, concentrating on the actions of those who broke windows and terrorized Center City pedestrians during their flight from police. Twenty-two people were seriously injured and fifty-seven were arrested. The court later found that "law enforcement officials of Philadelphia, having properly cleared the streets of a mob, may have applied the Pennsylvania criminal statutes ... overbroadly and indiscriminately in a situation where citizens were exercising their First Amendment rights in the Philadelphia community.

== Aftermath ==
=== Frank Rizzo ===
Reaction to the demonstration was split. Some criticized the brutal response of police officers against unarmed student, while others praised Rizzo's action to suppress the demonstration. Rizzo was supported by Mayor James Tate, who called him "the best law-enforcement officer in the land." The North City Congress, a social service organization, produced a report on November 29, 1967, entitled, "A Comparison of Police Action in Kensington Riots of 1966 and at the School Board Demonstration, November, 1967" noted the discrepancies in the actions of the Philadelphia Police Department, in the decision to attack the students at the Philadelphia school board demonstration as opposed to a riot which had occurred in a white community.

Rizzo defended his actions in a 1971 interview: "Look, I thought we handled ourselves well. We broke it up before it got out of hand. It might have been much worse if we had just stood by. I believe it is easier to blow out a match than extinguish a forest fire." He also blamed Superintendent Shedd for not requesting an injunction to prevent protests. Spencer Coxe, head of the local American Civil Liberties Union, countered that Rizzo was the direct cause of the violence: "There was a lot of noise, the crowd was very large. But when Rizzo took charge, there was a dramatic change in police behavior. ... after he arrived, they acted, I think, with great brutality. ... The police took their cue from the commissioner and their character changed in response to his wishes." Board President Dilworth also blamed Rizzo for acting precipitously: "Things were under control until Commissioner Rizzo, without our request, saw fit to loose a couple of hundred men, swinging clubs and beating children."

At least two court cases were filed against the Philadelphia Police Department for their role in the riot: Heard et al. v Rizzo et al. and Traylor et al. v. Rizzo et al., but the suits were dismissed by a three-member panel of the United States District Court for the Eastern District of Pennsylvania before the activists and protesters had a chance to present their case; upon subsequent appeal, the Supreme Court would not grant a hearing.

Rizzo was later elected Mayor of Philadelphia in 1971; during his attempt to gain a third term, the same groups that organized the November 17th Demonstration defeated his bid for office and an accompanying change in the City Charter which would have allowed a third term.

=== Mark Shedd ===
Mark Shedd made some initial reforms in the aftermath of the riot, including granting student demands for draft-counseling services, drafting a students’ bill of rights, and granting them a voice in curriculum and disciplinary procedures. However, his reforms were not well-received, and he was eventually forced to resign. During a private meeting on the afternoon of November 17, Shedd recalled that Rizzo warned him to ensure that students remained in school. "[Rizzo] was livid. His face and neck were red. He said directly to me, 'Get those f—ing black kids back to school This is my town. No softie from the outside is going to come in and screw it up. If you don't keep those kids in school, I'm going to run your ass out of Philadelphia if it's the last thing I do.'"

=== School reform ===
All of the demands of the students were won during the November 17 negotiations at the School Board. Many demands were placed in action, and enforced after the march and demonstration. The school board released a booklet on student rights in 1968. Although the demands were won in 1967, African American History did not become a graduation requirement for high school students in the School District of Philadelphia until 2005; it was the first school district in the United States with that requirement.

In "Discipline, Contradiction, and the Mis-Education of Philadelphia: The African and African-American Curriculum in Philadelphia High Schools and the Challenge of Junior ROTC, 1967-2005", Wes Enzinna's History Honors Thesis pointed out the strategy of authorities in opposing the demonstration was to increase the ability of those authorities to move youth into the military. The struggle continues, as at least one of the military academies have closed since 1990.

== See also ==
- Community Organizing
