= Philadelphia Student Union =

The Philadelphia Student Union (PSU) is a community organizing and leadership development non-profit organization in Philadelphia. Its stated mission is to build the power of young people to demand a high-quality education in the Philadelphia public school system. The organization claims to address problems of school funding, teacher quality, school climate, and other barriers to education for Philadelphia students, with students themselves as active leaders.

The Philadelphia Student Union was founded in 1995. The organization has helped to launch high school students' unions in six other cities, including the Chicago Students Union, Newark Students Union, and Providence Student Union. The organization has been recognized with various awards and honors including a number of Philadelphia Public School Notebook Student Journalism Awards, a Philadelphia Human Values Award, and the Philadelphia Education Fund's EDDY Award. The organization has also been the subject of extensive academic research.

== Media coverage of the Philadelphia Student Union ==
Earliest media coverage of the Philadelphia Student Union appears to date from 1996. The Philadelphia Student Union achieved prominence in 2001 when the members of the organization organized civil disobedience that "blocked access to the school district headquarters on a day when the administration was negotiating with EdisonLearning... which had signed a $2.7 million contract with the state and was set to take over the running of a considerable proportion of the district’s schools." This occurred during a controversy over whether EdisonLearning should be given control of the School District of Philadelphia.

In 2002, the Philadelphia Student Union received some media attention for their successful campaign to get the School District of Philadelphia to create Student Success Centers. PSU based this campaign on a survey of students throughout Philadelphia that "found 68% of them do not receive help with personal problems from anyone at school." Student Success Centers were implemented in 10 schools in 2003 and 2004.

The organization received media coverage in 2003 for a "nearly weeklong, 110-mile march" that a number of high school students completed from Philadelphia to Pennsylvania Capitol in Harrisburg, for "increased state funding to public schools".

In 2010, the Philadelphia Student Union's Campaign for Nonviolent Schools received media attention for "a 650-person youth-led march down Broad Street" in Philadelphia. In August 2012, the School Reform Commission announced that the Campaign had been successful in implementing changes in the Student Code of Conduct (the discipline code for the District) that limited which offenses could be met with suspension or expulsion. The Philadelphia Student Union was also cited as instrumental in the efforts to secure a new building for West Philadelphia High School.

On May 17, 2013, the Philadelphia Student Union organized a student walkout, #Walkout215, which was covered extensively in national news outlets. Reports stated that "thousands of students... from at least 27 schools" in the district walked out of class to protest a proposed austerity budget. A video of PSU members speaking at #Walkout215 was promoted on the front page of Upworthy. PSU member and Benjamin Franklin High School (Philadelphia) student Sharron Snyder appeared on MSNBC's Melissa Harris-Perry and Marc Lamont Hill's HuffPost Live in the weeks following the walkout. The Philadelphia Student Union was also featured on Melissa Harris-Perry in October 2013, when PSU member and Masterman High School student Nuwar Ahmed was interviewed on how "students raise their voices and take the lead, using activism to activate for education reform."

The Philadelphia Student Union also received widespread media attention in October 2014 for their action disrupting a screening of the film Won't Back Down, which they called "a propaganda film", at the School District of Philadelphia headquarters. The Philadelphia Inquirer reported that School Reform Commission member Sylvia Simms made controversial comments to students at the screening.

On July 15, 2015, the Philadelphia Public School Notebook reported that the Philadelphia Student Union had been evicted from its offices in the University City neighborhood of West Philadelphia, and was searching for a new home.

== List of schools with current or former Philadelphia Student Union chapters ==
1. Benjamin Franklin High School (Philadelphia)
2. Bartram High School
3. Bodine High School for International Affairs
4. Central High School (Philadelphia)
5. Furness High School
6. Masterman High School
7. Overbrook High School (Philadelphia)
8. Philadelphia High School for Girls
9. Science Leadership Academy
10. Simon Gratz High School
11. Sayre High School
12. South Philadelphia High School
13. West Philadelphia High School

== Notable alumni of the Philadelphia Student Union ==
- Peta Lindsay
