= Tony Watlington =

African American educator

Superintendent of the School District of Philadelphia
- Incumbent
- Assumed office June 16, 2022
- Preceded by: William R. Hite Jr.

Personal details
- Born: Fort Dix, New Jersey

Tony B. Watlington is an American educator and the superintendent of the School District of Philadelphia, the 8th largest school district in the United States, with more than 200,000 students. He previously served as the superintendent of the Rowan-Salisbury School System in North Carolina. He assumed his role with the School District of Philadelphia on June 16, 2022.

== Early life and education ==
Waltington was born the youngest of seven children in Fort Dix, New Jersey. He attended school in Harnett County, North Carolina. He received his undergraduate degree in history education from North Carolina A&T State University and his doctorate from the University of North Carolina at Chapel Hill.

== Career ==
He started his career as a bus driver and became a teacher. He then became an administrator in Guilford County Schools.

He was appointed as chief of Guilford County Schools until January 2021 when he was appointed superintendent of Rowan-Salisbury Schools.

He became a finalist for the School District of Philadelphia's superintendent search in 2022, and it was announced on April 1, 2022, that he had been offered and accepted the position.

Educational offices
Preceded by William R. Hite, Jr.	School District of Philadelphia Superintendent; 2022–	Incumbent
