= Peta Lindsay =

American politician (born 1984)

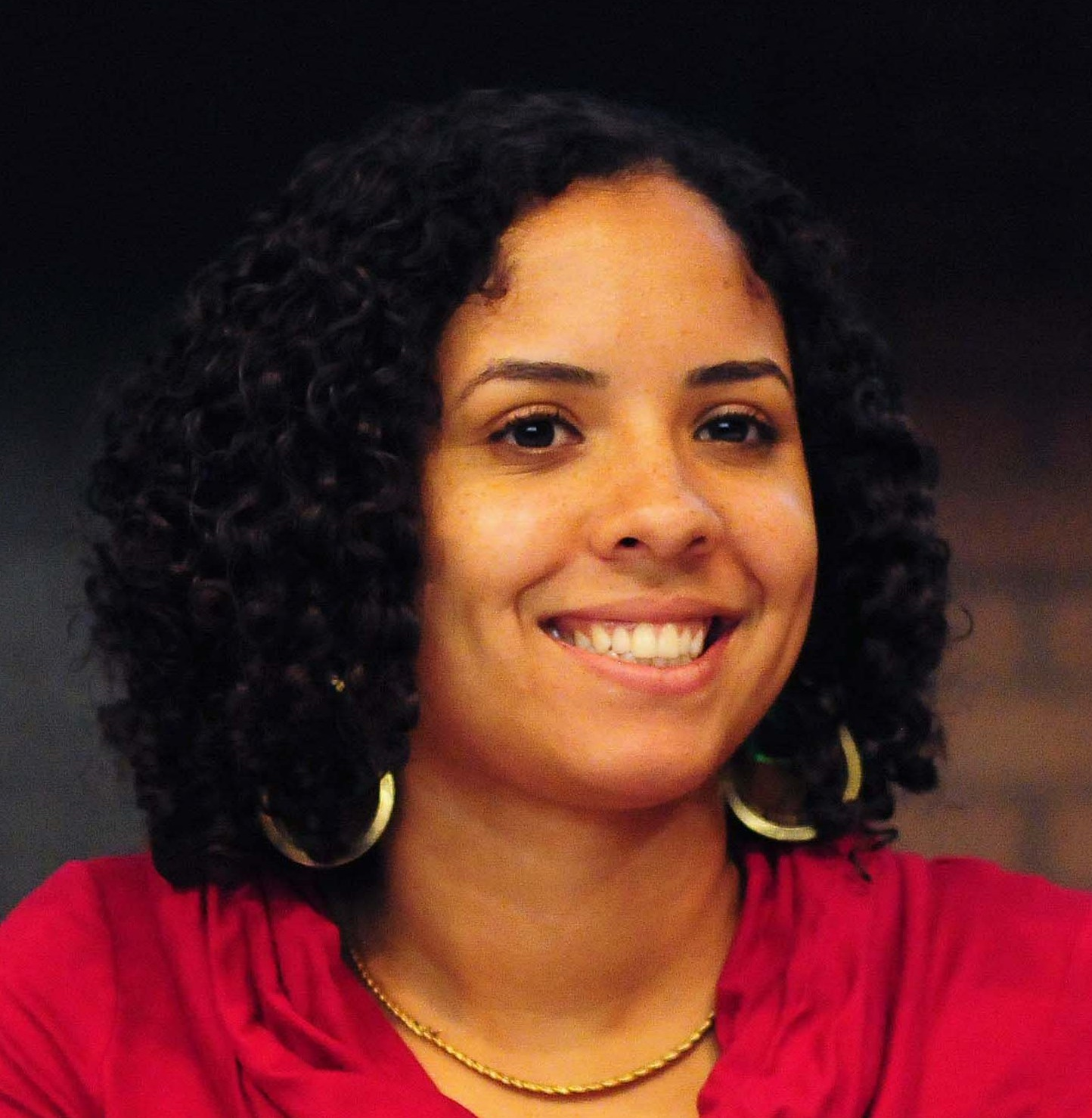

Personal details
- Born: Peta Millner Lindsay; May 7, 1984 (age 42) Bland County, Virginia, United States
- Party: Party for Socialism and Liberation
- Education: Howard University
- Website: Meet Peta Lindsay

Peta Millner Lindsay (born May 7, 1984) is an American anti-war activist. She was a presidential nominee of the Party for Socialism and Liberation in the 2012 U.S. presidential election.

== Early life and education ==
Peta Millner Lindsay was born on May 7, 1984 in Bland County, Virginia, before growing up in Philadelphia, Pennsylvania and Washington, D.C.. She became an activist as a middle school student with the Philadelphia Student Union, a non-profit organization of students demanding a high-quality education. Soon thereafter she became active with the A.N.S.W.E.R. (Act Now to Stop War and End Racism) coalition. On September 24, 2001, Lindsay spoke at ANSWER's first press conference as a high school student. In 2002, she traveled to Cuba with Interreligious Foundation for Community Organization.

Lindsay attended Howard University and continued as a leader with the ANSWER coalition, including as a lead organizer of the January 2003 protest against the upcoming Iraq War. She was recognized by The Washington Post in March 2003 for her anti-war activism in a piece entitled "Student Leader Sees Through Bush Propaganda". In October 2003, Lindsay said of the Iraq War, "The US government has no right to try and recolonize Iraq".

She is the founder and executive director of the Ida B. Wells Education Project, a collective of teachers and educators organizing for racial justice in classroom settings. She is currently a high school teacher in Los Angeles.

== 2012 Presidential race ==
In November 2011, Lindsay was named the Party for Socialism and Liberation's candidate for president along with Yari Osorio for vice president, despite being ineligible to become president due to her age, under Article II, Section 1, Clause 5 of the U.S. Constitution; she would need to be at least 35 in order to take office.

Lindsay and/or a stand-in was on the ballot in 13 states (Arkansas, Colorado, Florida, Iowa, Louisiana, Minnesota, New Jersey, New York, Rhode Island, Utah, Vermont, Washington, and Wisconsin). The campaign received 7,791 votes.
