= School District of Philadelphia =

Public school system of Philadelphia, Pennsylvania

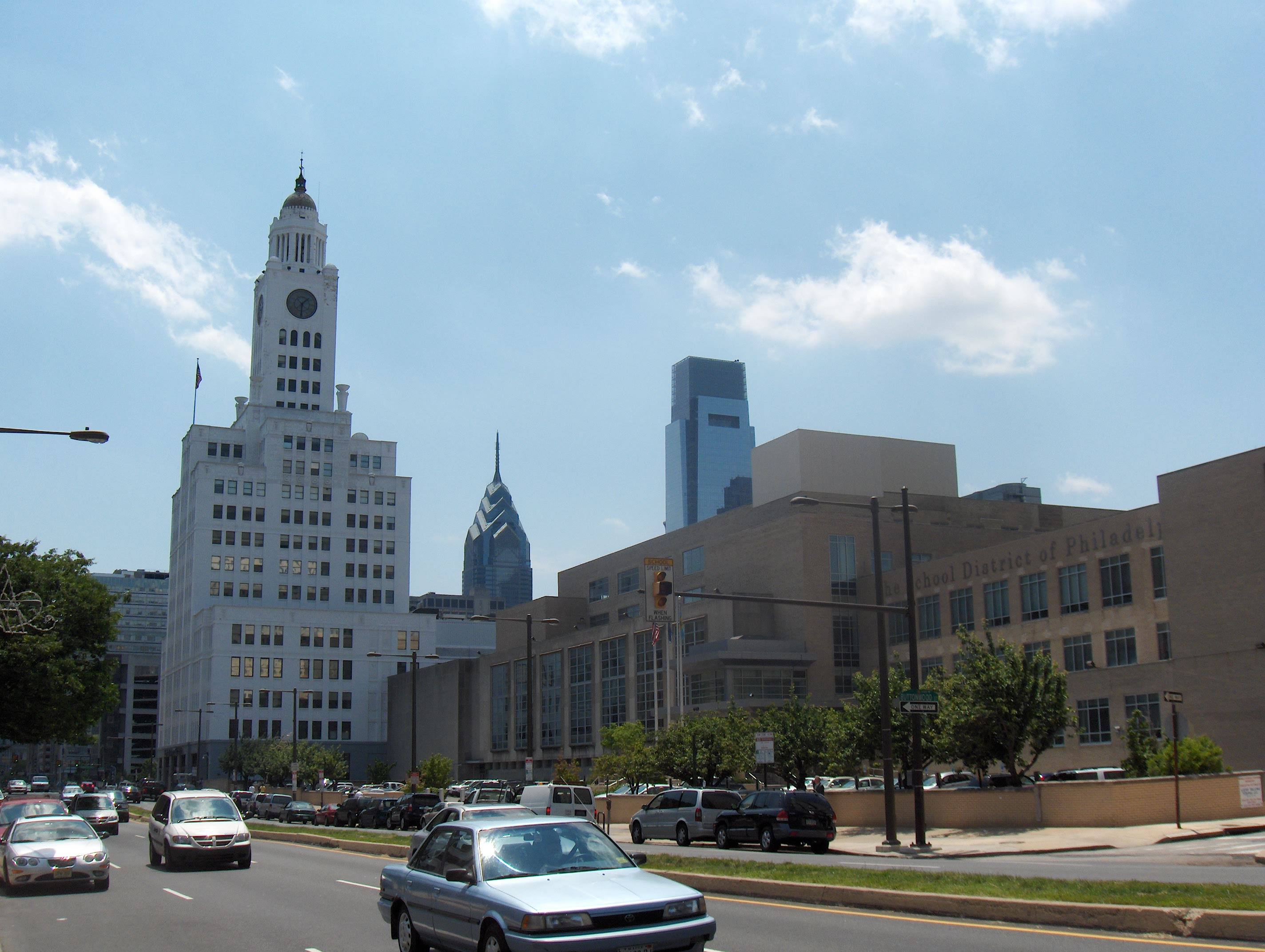
- The Philadelphia Board of Education Building, the district's headquarters, at 440 North Broad Street (in the right foreground)

Location
- 440 North Broad Street; Philadelphia, Pennsylvania 19130 United States
- Coordinates: 39°57′39″N 75°09′46″W

District information
- Type: Public
- Grades: Pre-K–12
- Established: 1818; 208 years ago
- President: Reginald L. Streater, Esq.,
- Superintendent: Tony Watlington
- School board: Board of Education
- Schools: 217 district schools; 83 charter schools; 29 alternative schools (2023)
- Budget: $4.3 billion (FY23)
- NCES District ID: 4218990

Students and staff
- Students: 197,288 (2022-2023)
- Staff: 22,590 (excludes charter schools) (April 1, 2023)

Other information
- Teachers' union: Philadelphia Federation of Teachers (PFT)
- Administrators' union: Commonwealth Association of School Administrators (CASA)
- Website: www.philasd.org

The School District of Philadelphia (SDP) is a school district that includes all school district-operated public schools in Philadelphia. Established in 1818, it is the largest school district in Pennsylvania and the eighth-largest school district in the nation, serving over 197,000 students as of 2022.

The school board was created in 1850 to oversee the schools of Philadelphia. The Act of Assembly of April 5, 1867, designated that the Controllers of the Public Schools of Philadelphia were to be appointed by the judges of the Court of Common Pleas. There was one Controller to be appointed from each ward. This was done to eliminate politics from the management of the schools.

Eventually, the management of the school district was given to a school board appointed by the mayor. This continued until 2001 when the district was taken over by the state, and the governor was given the power to appoint a majority of the five members of the new School Reform Commission. In July 2018, the School Reform Commission (SRC) was disbanded and control of the district was returned to the city and its newly selected Philadelphia School Board.

== Schools ==
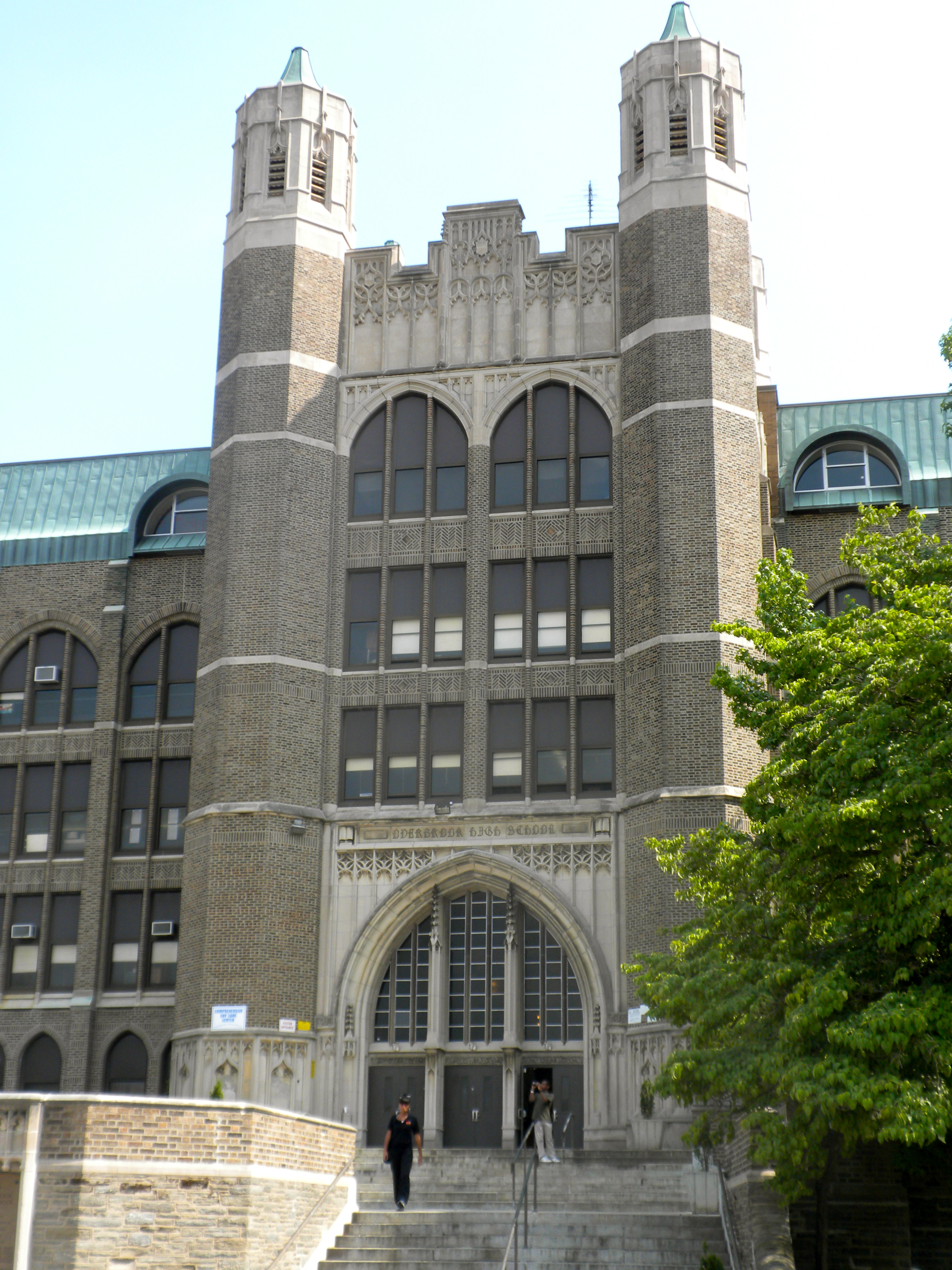
Overbrook High School in the Overbrook section of West Philadelphia

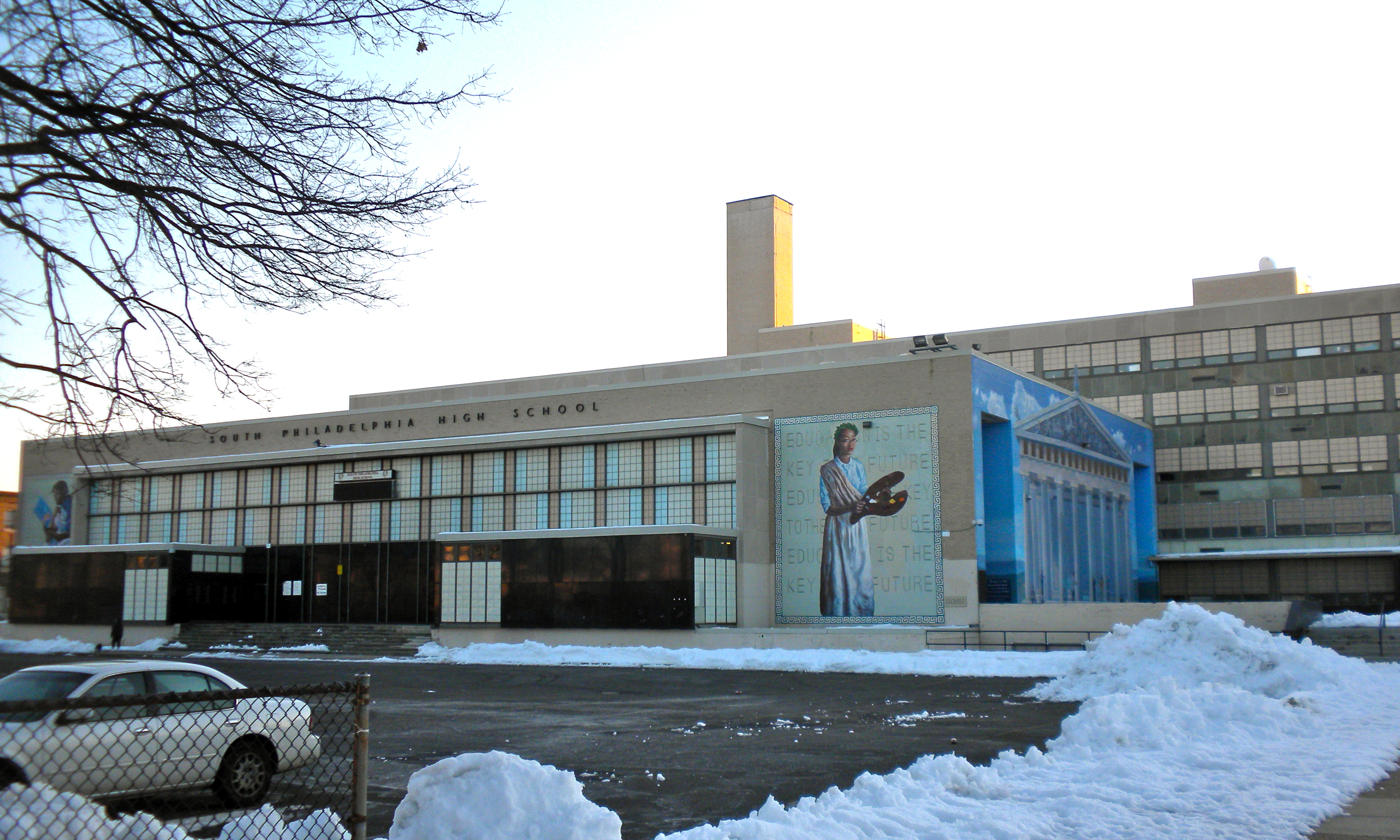
South Philadelphia High School at 2101 South Broad Street in South Philadelphia

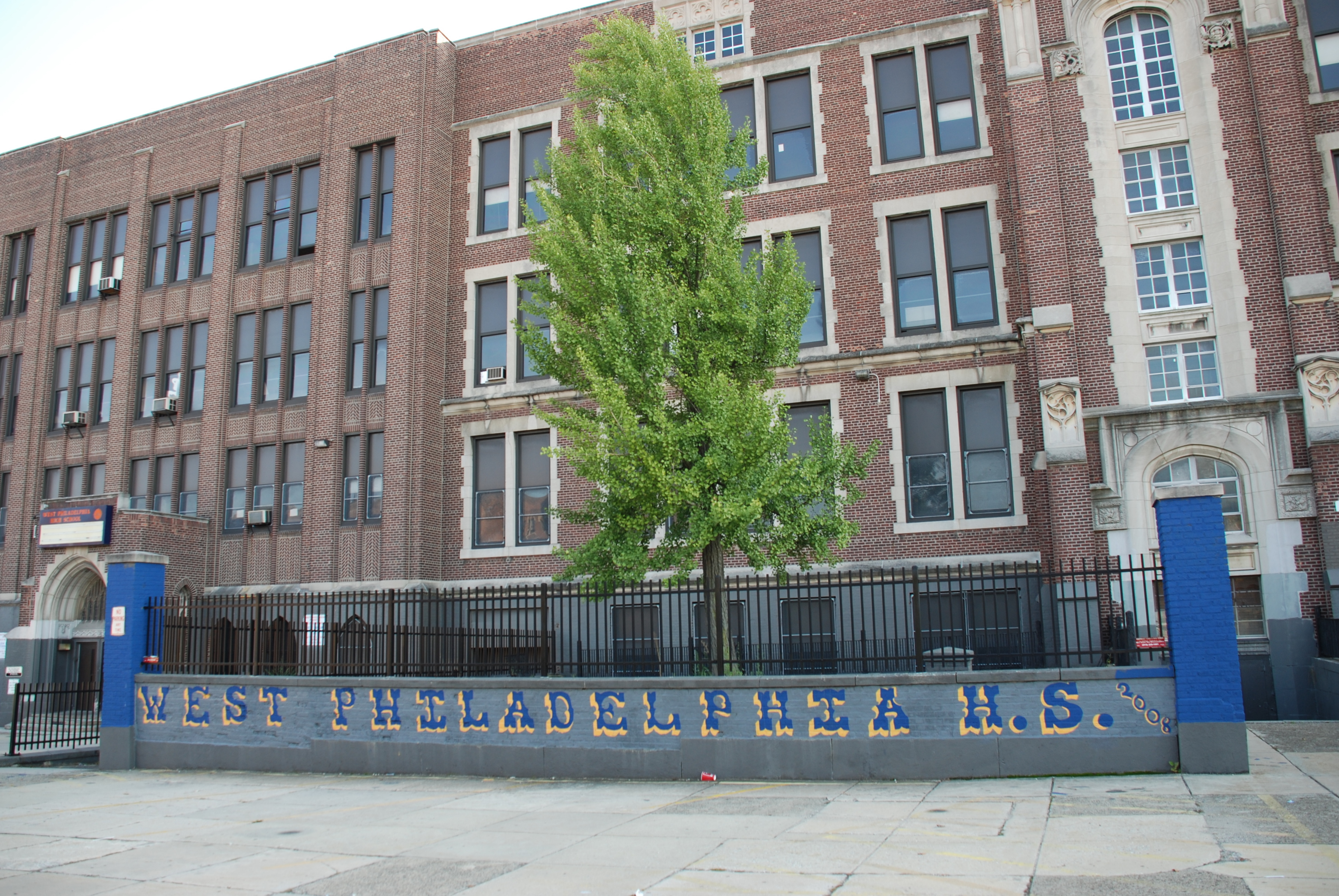
West Philadelphia High School at 49th and Chestnut streets in West Philadelphia

The School District of Philadelphia operates 151 elementary and K-8 schools, 16 middle schools, and 57 high schools.

The remaining 83 public schools are independently operated charter schools. Charter schools are authorized by the School District of Philadelphia, and are accountable to it.

== Demographics ==
Enrollment in Philadelphia's district schools was 203,225 students as of September 2019.

As of the 2014–2015 school year, there were 107 languages other than English spoken at home by district students. The largest group of students with families using languages other than English at home was the Spanish speakers, with 6,260 students, making up 52% of the school district's other than English at home population. The other languages, in descending order, were Mandarin Chinese, Arabic, Vietnamese, Khmer, various English and Haitian Creole, French-Base Creole and Pidgins, Russian, French, Portuguese, Nepali, Cantonese Chinese, Pashto, Malayalam, Ukrainian, Albanian, Bengali, and 82 other languages.

Enrollment in the city's charter schools was 60,774 students (December 2013).

== Organization ==
The School District of Philadelphia is the sole school district in Philadelphia, the nation's sixth-largest city as of 2020 census.

Prior to August 2012, the district was organized into academic division (AD) offices, each with its own assistant superintendent. As a part of the Chief Academic Office Reorganization/Transition Proposal, the AD structure was abolished. Schools are organized into Principal Learning Teams (PLTs), each with its own peer-selected coordinator and all schools now report to the Chief Academic Office through the Office of School Performance Management.

== Governance ==
The School District of Philadelphia is governed by a nine-member board of education. All members are appointed by the Mayor of Philadelphia and approved by Philadelphia City Council. The board of education was re-established in July 2018 after seventeen years of governance by a School Reform Commission.

== History ==
=== Twentieth century ===
In 1967, high school students demonstrated in front of the board of education building, demanding better treatment, especially for African-American students, and better funding. The demonstrators were met with force by the Philadelphia Police Department, and the resulting riot left 22 injured and 57 arrested.

The state takeover of the district had its roots in the chronic low test scores of district students and a history of inequitable financing which left the district with substantial and perpetual deficits. In 1975, Pennsylvania provided 55 percent of school funding statewide; in 2001 it provided less than 36 percent. An analysis determined that increased district spending was limited by a state system which relies heavily on property taxes for local school funding. As a result, wealthier school districts with proportionately more property owners and more expensive real estate have more funds for schools. The result is great disparities in school system expenditures per student.

In 2000, the Philadelphia school district spent $6,969 a year per student. Seventy percent of Philadelphia's students are at or near the poverty line. This contrasts with expenditures per student in wealthier suburban school districts, such as Jenkintown School District ($12,076), Radnor Township School District ($13,288), and Upper Merion School District ($13,139).

In February 1998, then-superintendent David Hornbeck threatened to close the city's schools if the state did not provide the funds needed to balance his proposed budget.

State lawmakers responded to the threat with fast-moving legislation, Act 46, on April 21, approving a school funding package that included a takeover plan. The legislature's plan was a reaction to Hornbeck's threatening to shut down the schools because of a financial crisis.

"Holding students and their parents and teachers hostage in an effort to gain additional funding is certainly bold but not very wise", commented Representative Dwight Evans, Democratic chair of the House Appropriations Committee and prime architect of the takeover bill.

Two lawsuits were filed by the city and the Philadelphia School District in 1997 and 1998 to address what they considered inadequate funding levels. The first, filed by the school district, the city and community leaders, contended that Pennsylvania did not provide a "thorough and efficient" education; it was dismissed outright by the state court. The second case, a civil rights suit filed in Federal District Court, by the district, the city, and other interested parties, contended that the state's funding practices discriminated against school districts with large numbers of non-white students; the School District of Philadelphia was a key complainant in this case. The city agreed to put this case on hold when Mayor Street negotiated the "friendly" state takeover of the district, with the promise of additional funding from the state.

=== Twenty-first century ===
In June 2000, under increasing pressure to find a solution to the fiscal and academic problems facing the district, school superintendent David W. Hornbeck ended his six-year tenure. Hornbeck said he did not have the financial support of state and city officials to continue his school reform program (and a year later launched a statewide advocacy organization, Good Schools Pennsylvania, to mobilize citizens in support of improved state funding for public education). He called improving public education "one of the great civil rights battles of this generation." The board of education then implemented a new management structure, replacing the superintendent's position with two new positions, a chief academic officer, Deidre Fambry, and a chief executive officer.

In 2001, the district had a projected deficit of $216.7 million in its current $1.7 billion budget. There was a crisis in making the school payroll and paying $30 million in vendor bills. In recognition of the assistance, Mayor Street agreed to postpone for three months a 1998 federal lawsuit brought by the city claiming racial discrimination in the way the state funds the Philadelphia school district. In a study released in July by the Harvard Civil Rights Project, Pennsylvania was ranked as having the sixth most segregated schools in the United States. Under the legislation enacted in 1998, in 2001 Governor Mark Schweiker took control of the schools. The state takeover of what was then the fifth largest school district in the United States was seen as the most radical reform ever undertaken in a large urban school district. This move was opposed by Mayor John F. Street and many members of the city of Philadelphia. The negotiations dragged on because of the state's insistence that the city pay its fair share, while the city fought to retain some control over the governance. Also at stake was the control of patronage jobs controlled by the mayor in the district's central administration.

In the end, the city put up an additional $45 million for the schools instead of the $15 million initially offered and the state provided an additional $75 million. In return, the mayor gets to appoint two commission members rather than just one under the governor's initial plan.

The schools were clearly failing, but the state and the city could not agree on reform and local governance issues. As negotiation continued, a coalition of labor unions and community groups called the "Coalition to Keep Our Public Schools Public", filed a lawsuit to stop the state from signing a contract for Edison Schools to manage city schools. The state backed off on a hostile takeover and negotiated with the city. One of the chief concerns was the complete privatization of the school district.

The reform plan was opposed by the Philadelphia Federation of Teachers. Protestors like J. Whyatt Mondesire of the NAACP vowed "... to shut down the streets", in protest. Members of the NAACP and a group of black ministers blocked an intersection in front of City Hall during rush-hour traffic. The day before, several hundred students walked out of classes. And earlier a crowd consisting mostly of unionized district employees marched on City Hall, where they disrupted the Christmas tree-lighting ceremony and drowned out the choir with their chants.

On December 21, 2001, Secretary Charles Zogby of the Pennsylvania Department of Education signed a Declaration of Distress for the district. This triggered the state takeover of the school district from the City of Philadelphia. The state of Pennsylvania formed the School Reform Commission to oversee the troubled public school system.

This action was the result of a months long negotiation under the legislation enacted by the Pennsylvania General Assembly in April 1998. The takeover plan had six main elements: putting the district under the control of a School Reform Commission; hire a CEO; enable the CEO to reform the teaching staff by hiring non-certified staff, reconstitute troubled schools by reassigning or firing staff; allow the commission to hire for-profit firms to manage some schools; convert some schools to charter schools; and reallocate and redistribute school district resources.

At the time of the takeover, it was expected that Edison Schools, Inc. would be one of the prime beneficiaries of the partial privatization. It had been involved in developing the plan for privatization commissioned by then governor Tom Ridge. Edison was not given as many schools as it had hoped, primarily because of conflict of interest concerns Youth organizers from the Philadelphia Student Union staged protests, and engaged in civil disobedience to prevent the school district from handing over control of the central administration to Edison. Youth leaders were ultimately successful in preventing a takeover of the central office, and also prevented the take-over of any high schools by for-profit companies. As of 2007 the company had not delivered the promised improvements.

After the state takeover, the district adopted what is known as the "diverse provider" model, turning over the management of some of the lowest-achieving schools to for-profit and nonprofit organizations and two local universities and providing additional resources to the private managers. The most controversial of the 2001 reforms the partnership program saw "educational management organizations" (EMOs) Edison Schools, Foundations Inc., Victory Schools, Universal Companies, Temple University, and University of Pennsylvania brought in to manage some of the district's lowest-performing schools.

To date, the schools managed by private providers were doing neither better nor worse than district-wide achievement trends. District-managed schools given additional resources but no specific intervention were likewise doing about as well as other schools in the district. In contrast, district-managed schools given additional resources and a "restructuring" intervention showed larger achievement gains in mathematics.

==== 2013 hunger strike ====
In June 2013, the school district cut over three thousand employees. Two thousand and two of them were aides that ensured the safety of the students during the school day. This budget cut angered parents, students, and employees. Governor Corbett had until the end of the month to approve the budget, so many took to protesting outside his office. UNITE HERE, the union which represented the laid off workers, helped organize a hunger strike. On June 17, two parents and two cafeteria workers began a hunger strike and the protest was named "Fast for Safe Schools". The protesters received a lot of support from the community as well as politicians. On June 28 fifteen politicians fasted for twenty-four hours to show their support. On the same day members of the community delivered a petition with more than one thousand signatures to Governor Corbett. Governor Corbett did finally add $140 million to the budget even though it was less than what was requested by the community. The community celebrated this victory that they achieved through nonviolent protest. However, by the time school was starting in August, the safety staff had not been hired back. On August 14, over one hundred community members resumed the hunger strike for a twenty four-hour period. As a result, most of the staff was rehired.

=== 2025 investigation by the Committee on Education and Workforce ===
On November 24th, Dr. Tony Watlington (supervisor of the SDP) received a notice of investigation of violations of obligation under Title VI and proliferation of antisemitism by the House Education and Workforce Committee. In 2024, the school district was found by OCR to have violated Title VI. In November, formal complaints by parents and additional investigation showed a proliferation of antisemitic incidents in violation of the OCR injunction that prompted a Federal investigation into the school district.

== Policies ==
Beginning in 2001 the district required all schools to enact school uniforms or strict dress codes. Some schools had already adopted uniforms prior to 2001.

=== Learning networks ===
Each school in the School District of Philadelphia is part of a learning network that is led by an Assistant Superintendent, to whom school principals report. SDP learning networks include geography-based learning networks that are numbered (13 during the 2023-2024 school year). SDP learning networks also include the Acceleration Network for schools receiving additional intervention support to improve academics, the Innovation Network that includes criteria-based schools, and the Opportunity Network that includes alternative and contract-based schools that offer targeted programming to smaller groups of high need students.

SDP leadership also includes Associate Superintendents of School Performance, who support either Elementary or Secondary schools.

This leadership structure aligns to the School District of Philadelphia's five year strategic plan. "Accelerate Philly: 2023-2028 Strategic Plan" focuses on "Centering schools and school leadership teams as the units of change", according to its Theory of Action. Beginning with the 2024–25 school year, networks returned to 15 and being geographically-bound (with the exception of Network 15, comprising high schools).

=== Staff hiring and performance measure ===
Under the strategic plan, the district allows principals to hire teachers and staff and create incentives for high-performing teachers and schools, such as tenure. The district also created tracking tools, and performance indicators, to gauge the progress of schools and how schools affect student achievement. The district increased the staff and accessibility of its call centers to provide services and allow parents and the community to report directly to the headquarters.

=== Parent and community engagement ===
The district's many parent and community engagement policies are combined in a central office called the Office of Parent Family, Community, Engagement, and Faith-Based Partnerships. Between 2004 and 2009, outside funding for parent engagement was provided by the William Penn Foundation for the Parent Leadership Academy (PLA) and The PA Department of Education for the Parent Volunteers Program (PVP). The district has implemented various different programs to engage families in the education of their children. In collaboration with the PA Parent Information Resource Center (PIRC), the district designated October as Parent Appreciation Month beginning in 2006. Parent Appreciation Month activities included Parent Appreciation Day, Superintendent's Closet Fashion Shows, Take a Parent to Work Day, and Superintendent's Home Visits. Parent Assistance Desks (PADs) offered a way for parents to feel welcomed upon entering schools by having a parent from the community sit in an office or at a desk at the front door to provide needed resources and information. The Title I Parents 'R' Equal Partners (PREP) Program helped PREPare parents for effective partnerships with principals and administrators by conducting monthly workshops and training. In 2009, The Superintendent's Roundtable discussions were held to hear (firsthand) from many parents who felt that their children were not receiving the quality education they deserved. In 2010, School Advisory Councils (SACs) were modeled after the PA Governor's Institute of Parental Involvement to invite parents, family, and community members to share decision-making with school-based staff.

The Parent University of Philadelphia offered a variety of free courses to parents, such as basic computer skills, lessons on the legal rights of parents, English as a second language, and other evidence-based knowledge and skills enhancement courses. Parent University was funded heavily by a Federal Stimulus grant. The district also set up citywide resource centers where parents can get resources to seek help from the district on issues that could not be resolved at the school, such as bullying problems or complaints. The number of Parent Ombudsmen, school-based staff who work directly with a parent, was increased to serve 173 schools. Many of the programs have received local and national attention for pioneering the field of parent engagement.

== Art in the public schools ==
The school district has an art collection that contains about 1,125 paintings, photos, sculptures and other pieces that are displayed in schools or are stored in an undisclosed facility. The estimated worth was $30 million in 2003, but district spokesperson Fernando Gallard estimates the collection is worth $2 million in 2013. Much of this art disappeared when Paul Vallas was Superintendent of the Philadelphia School District.
