= David Kennedy =

David Kennedy may refer to:

== Arts and entertainment ==
- David Kennedy (actor) (born 1964), British actor
- David Kennedy (born 1988), British musician performing as Pearson Sound
- David Kennedy (film producer) (1941–2015), American film producer
- David Kennedy (singer) (1825–1886), Scottish minister and tenor
- David J. Kennedy (painter) (1816/17–1898), Philadelphia painter
- David Michael Kennedy (born 1950), American fine art photographer

== Politicians and government ==
- David Kennedy (Australian politician) (born 1940), politician and member of the Australian House of Representatives
- David B. Kennedy (1933–2019), member of the Wyoming House of Representatives
- David Kennedy (economist) (born 1969), British civil servant, formerly chief executive of the Committee on Climate Change
- David J. Kennedy (politician) (1907–1995), Maine politician and pharmacist
- David M. Kennedy (politician) (1905–1996), American businessman, economist and United States Secretary of the Treasury
- David T. Kennedy (1934–2014), American politician, mayor of Miami

== Science and academics ==
- David Kennedy (astronomer) (1864–1936), first New Zealand born Marist priest, noted astronomer and educator
- David Kennedy (jurist) (born 1954), American legal academic, vice president of international affairs at Brown University
- David L. Kennedy (born 1948), Scottish Roman archaeologist and historian at the University of Western Australia and the University of Oxford
- David M. Kennedy (historian) (born 1941), Pulitzer Prize-winning historian and professor at Stanford
- David M. Kennedy (criminologist) (born 1958), American criminologist, author of Don't Shoot

== Sports ==
- David Kennedy (hurler) (born 1976), Irish hurler
- David Kennedy (racing driver) (born 1953), Irish racing driver
- Dave Kennedy (footballer) (born 1949), English footballer
- David Kennedy (cricketer) (1890–1916), Scottish cricketer and soldier

== Other ==
- David Anthony Kennedy (1955–1984), son of Robert F. Kennedy and member of Kennedy family
- David Kennedy (advertising) (1939–2021), American advertising executive, co-founder of the Wieden+Kennedy agency
- David Kennedy, 1st Earl of Cassilis (aft. 1463–1513), Scottish peer
- David Kennedy, 10th Earl of Cassilis (bef. 1734–1792), Scottish peer
- David S. Kennedy (1791–1853), Scottish-American merchant and banker
