= Schuylkill Crossing Swing Bridge =

Multiuse bridge in Philadelphia, Pennsylvania

- The rehabilitated bridge in November 2026
- Coordinates: 39.9406°N 75.2050°W
- Crosses: Schuylkill River
- Locale: Philadelphia, Pennsylvania
- Other name(s): Philadelphia, Wilmington and Baltimore Railroad Bridge No. 1, Grays Ferry Railroad Bridge, PRR South Philadelphia Branch Bridge
- Owner: City of Philadelphia

Characteristics
- Design: Through truss swing bridge
- Material: Steel
- Total length: 387.5 feet (118.1 m)
- Longest span: 226.6 feet (69.1 m)
- No. of spans: 3
- Clearance below: 26 feet, 1 inch above mean high tide

History
- Constructed by: American Bridge Company
- Construction start: 1901
- Opened: 1902
- Rebuilt: 2026
- Replaces: Newkirk Viaduct

Location
- Interactive map of Schuylkill Crossing Swing Bridge

Schuylkill Crossing Swing Bridge is a pedestrian and bike swing bridge that carries the Schuylkill River Trail over the Schuylkill River between the Kingsessing and Grays Ferry neighborhoods of Philadelphia, Pennsylvania.

Part of a long succession of ferry and bridge crossings at this location, the bridge was built in 1901-02 as Philadelphia, Wilmington and Baltimore Railroad Bridge No. 1, by American Bridge Company for the Philadelphia, Wilmington and Baltimore Railroad. Over the decades, ownership of the bridge passed to PW&B successor railroads: the Philadelphia, Baltimore & Washington Railroad, Penn Central, and Conrail, which formally placed it out of operation in 1976.

The conversion of the railroad bridge for trail use began in 2017, when Conrail conveyed the bridge to the city of Philadelphia. The bridge's truss and superstructure were demolished the following year, with the pilings spared to serve as a foundation for a new swing span that was completed in November 2026.

== History ==
=== Background ===
The bridge's location has been a major crossing point since the establishment of a ferry here as early as 1673 and certainly by 1696. In 1777, British troops built a pontoon bridge here during their occupation of Philadelphia, and the newly independent Americans subsequently kept it up, replacing parts as necessary after floods. In 1838, the PW&B built the first permanent bridge here to complete the first direct rail link from Philadelphia to Wilmington, Delaware, and Baltimore, Maryland. Called the Newkirk Viaduct, it was a covered wooden bridge that carried a road as well as one track. The bridge did not initially allow locomotives to pass so the cars were (at least until 1844) pulled by horses over the river and northward along three miles of track to the terminus of the PW&B. A new draw span was constructed in 1891—ten years after the Pennsylvania Railroad had taken control of the PW&B—but maintenance remained difficult.

=== Railroad bridge ===
In 1901, when the city of Philadelphia opened an adjacent highway bridge, it absolved the PW&B of the responsibility of carrying road traffic across the Schuylkill. The railroad promptly began building a rail-only bridge.

PW&B Bridge No. 1 was the first swing bridge at this location. A cylindrical stone pier was built in mid-stream for the main span to pivot on, and a wooden pile fender was constructed to keep boats from colliding with the bridge. To avoid interfering with river traffic during construction, the American Bridge Company built the 226-foot-7-inch (69.1 m) swing span in its open position. This main span sat between two 97-foot-9 3/8-inch (29.8 m) approach spans. "The mechanism, located on the swing span and driven by steam, is typical of movable bridge construction at the turn of the twentieth century," wrote historian Justin Spivey.

The bridge was completed and opened in 1902. Maximum speed over the bridge was 15 miles per hour (24 km/h).

On April 14, 1945, the funeral train carrying the body of President Franklin D. Roosevelt passed over the bridge, where mourners gathered to watch its passage.

Over the decades, ownership of the bridge passed to PW&B successor railroads: the Philadelphia, Baltimore & Washington Railroad in 1902, then Penn Central in 1968.

In 1976, Conrail acquired Penn Central's former Pennsylvania Railroad properties. It promptly declared the bridge out of service, and left it permanently open.

Spivey wrote for the Historic American Engineering Record that an unknown party purchased the bridge in 1987; it is unclear how this squares with Conrail's later transfer of the bridge to the city of Philadelphia.

=== Conversion to trail ===
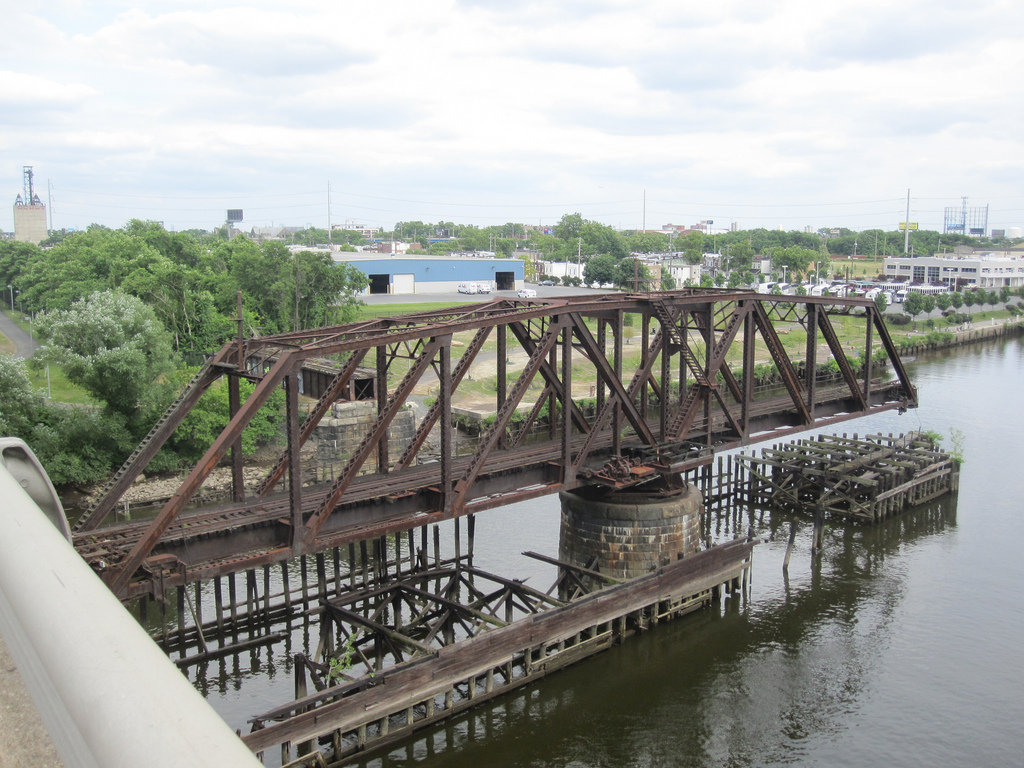
The bridge before rehabilitation, 2011

In November 2009, proposals to restore the bridge as a river crossing led to an initial "stakeholder meeting". That led the Schuylkill River Development Corporation (SRDC) and its design consultant, Amman & Whitney, to explore options such as installing a prefabricated truss, building a cable-stayed structure, or rehabilitating the existing railroad truss.

In 2012, Philadelphia mayor Michael Nutter proposed to return the bridge to service as a part of the Schuylkill River Trail, a multi-use trail. Under his proposal, the bridge would be raised some 33 feet (10 m) so that boats — in particular, a towboat used to bring oil barges to the Trigen power plant upstream — could pass without swinging it open.

In May 2016, councilmember Kenyatta Johnson introduced a bill in Philadelphia City Council to allow the city to acquire the bridge and some surrounding land from Conrail.

In 2017, the city launched its $13 million ($16.8 million today) project to replace the truss with a bike-trail structure to be named "Conrail Crossing". Project roles were set: SRDC would manage planning and design, which would be executed by architecture and engineering firm Amman & Whitney and transportation engineers Hardesty & Hanover. Construction would be managed by the municipal goverment's StreetsDOT Construction Unit with construction management and inspection services provided by Urban Engineers, Gresham Consulting, and Michael Baker International. The actual construction would be handled by A.P. Construction and its subcontractors. The project was funded by the Federal Highway Administration and Pennsylvania Department of Transportation.

The proposal to raise the bridge was abandoned in favor of simply replacing the heavy-duty railroad truss with a lighter truss for the trail. The project also included new machinery, approach-span floor beams, concrete decks, railings, lighting, and fender system. The new bridge was to open in 2018.

In November 2017, Conrail transferred ownership of the bridge to the city government. On August 23, 2018, the bridge's truss and superstructure were demolished, leaving the pilings as a foundation for the planned bike-pedestrian bridge.

But construction proceeded slowly. The anticipated completion of the bridge shifted to 2019. Keisha McCarty-Skelton, a spokesperson for the city government's Department of Streets, told the Philadelphia Inquirer that the delays were caused by “typical construction issues,” truss design and fabrication issues, and pandemic-related supply chain delays that “affected procurement of project materials such as truss steel and movable bridge steel machinery.” In 2020, a barge collided with the bridge, causing a legal fight over liability. Later, several parts fabricated for the bridge in Coatesville, Pennsylvania, were damaged by wind in a storm. In June 2023, completion of the bridge was expected in summer 2024. In October 2024, completion was expected in mid-2025. In July 2025, the last of the new bridge's truss sections was set into place; the final work of joining the sections and pouring the concrete deck was expected to be done late in the year. By year's end, the expected opening date was "winter 2025/2026".

The 415-foot bridge was reopened as Schuylkill Crossing Swing Bridge on November 13, 2026, after five years of planning and eight of construction. It is the country's only operational swing bridge dedicated to trail use.

== See also ==
- List of bridges documented by the Historic American Engineering Record in Pennsylvania
- List of crossings of the Schuylkill River
