= Grays Ferry, Philadelphia =

Neighborhood in Philadelphia, US

Grays Ferry
- Neighborhood of Philadelphia
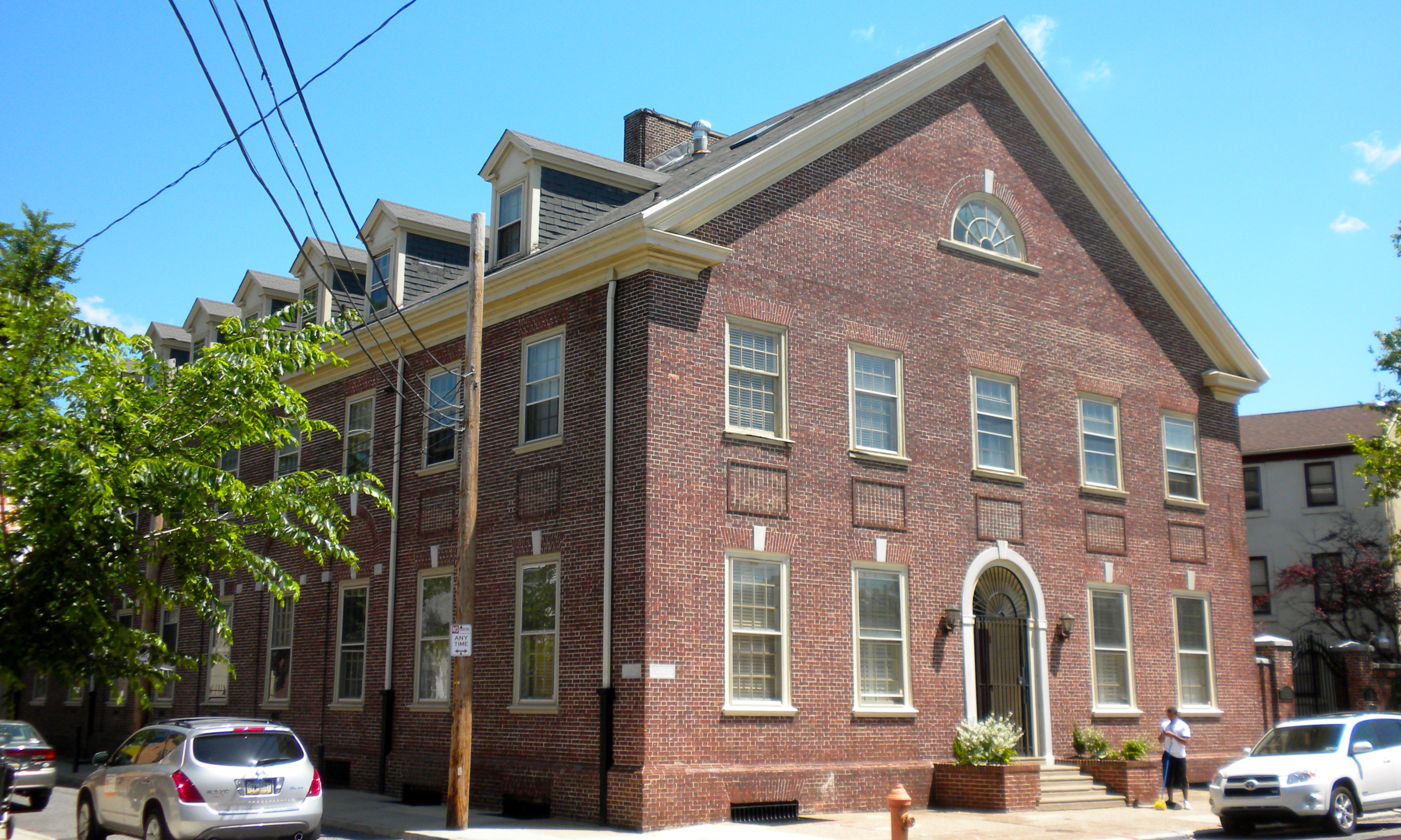
- Grays Road Recreation Center

- Location within Philadelphia
- Country: United States
- State: Pennsylvania
- County: Philadelphia
- City: Philadelphia
- Area codes: 215, 267 and 445

Grays Ferry, also known as Gray's Ferry, is a neighborhood in South Philadelphia, Pennsylvania, United States, bounded (roughly) by 25th Street on the east, the Schuylkill River on the west, Vare Avenue on the south, and Grays Ferry Avenue on the north. The section of this neighborhood west of 34th Street is also known as Forgotten Bottom.

Grays Ferry shares borders with Southwest Center City to the north, Point Breeze to the east, and Girard Estate to the south. Grays Ferry is across from where Mill Creek debouches at about 43rd street.

Grays Ferry was historically one of the largest enclaves of Irish Americans in the city, and while there are still many Irish left, it is now home to a majority African American population.

== History ==
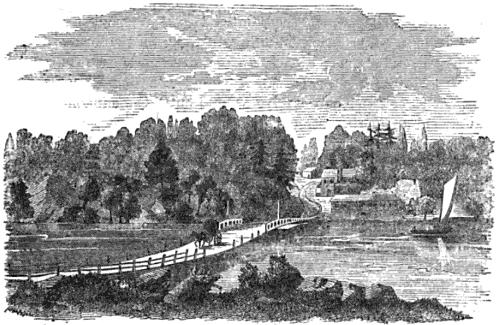
The Floating Bridge across the Schuylkill River at Gray's Ferry was originally built by the British during their 1777-78 occupation of Philadelphia, and it remained the primary entrance to Philadelphia from the south until 1838, when it was replaced by a permanent bridge.

The area developed near an important crossing of the Schuylkill River. In the 18th century, Gray's Ferry was the southernmost of three ferries that crossed the Schuylkill River to Philadelphia. The neighborhood's namesake ferry originally belonged to a Benjamin Chambers in the 17th century. By 1747 George Gray had taken over the ferry, and established the nearby Gray's Inn and Gray's Garden, which were popular in the 1790s. The river is now spanned by the Grays Ferry Bridge and several rail bridges.

Before the Act of Consolidation in 1854, this neighborhood was part of Moyamensing Township. Moyamensing was chartered by the Dutch governor Alexander d'Hinoyossa, and in 1684, William Penn confirmed the title.

This neighborhood was once the site of the Schuylkill Arsenal.

The James Alcorn School, Charles Y. Audenried Junior High School, Grays Road Recreation Center, James McCann Foundation, University Avenue Bridge, and Anthony Wayne School are listed on the National Register of Historic Places.

== Demographics ==
- Black, 56%; White, 39%; Other, 5%.
- More than 30% of the residents are under 18.
- Currently the neighborhood, which represents less than 1% of the city's population, houses more than 10% of the city's Section 8 residents.

== Education ==
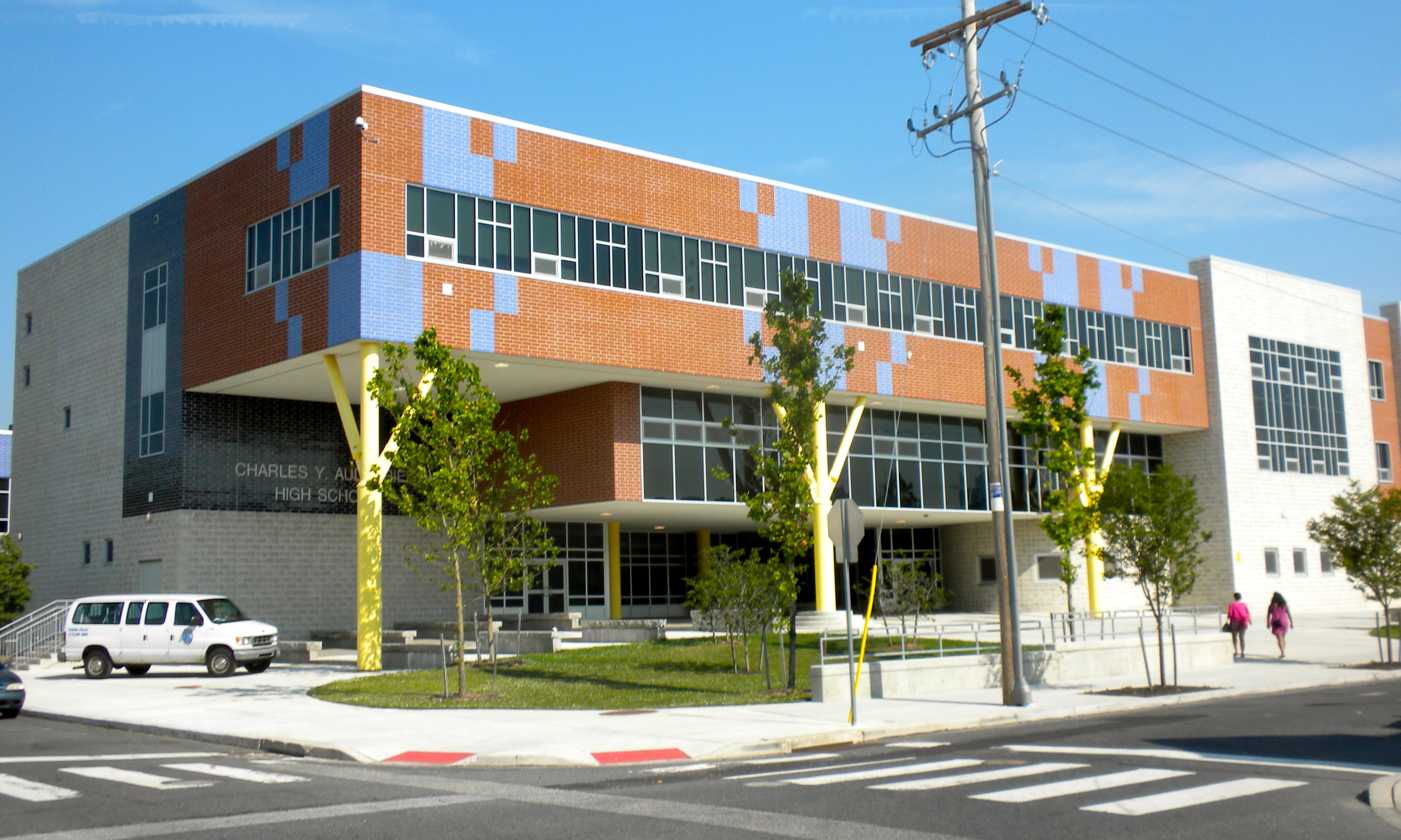
Audenried High School

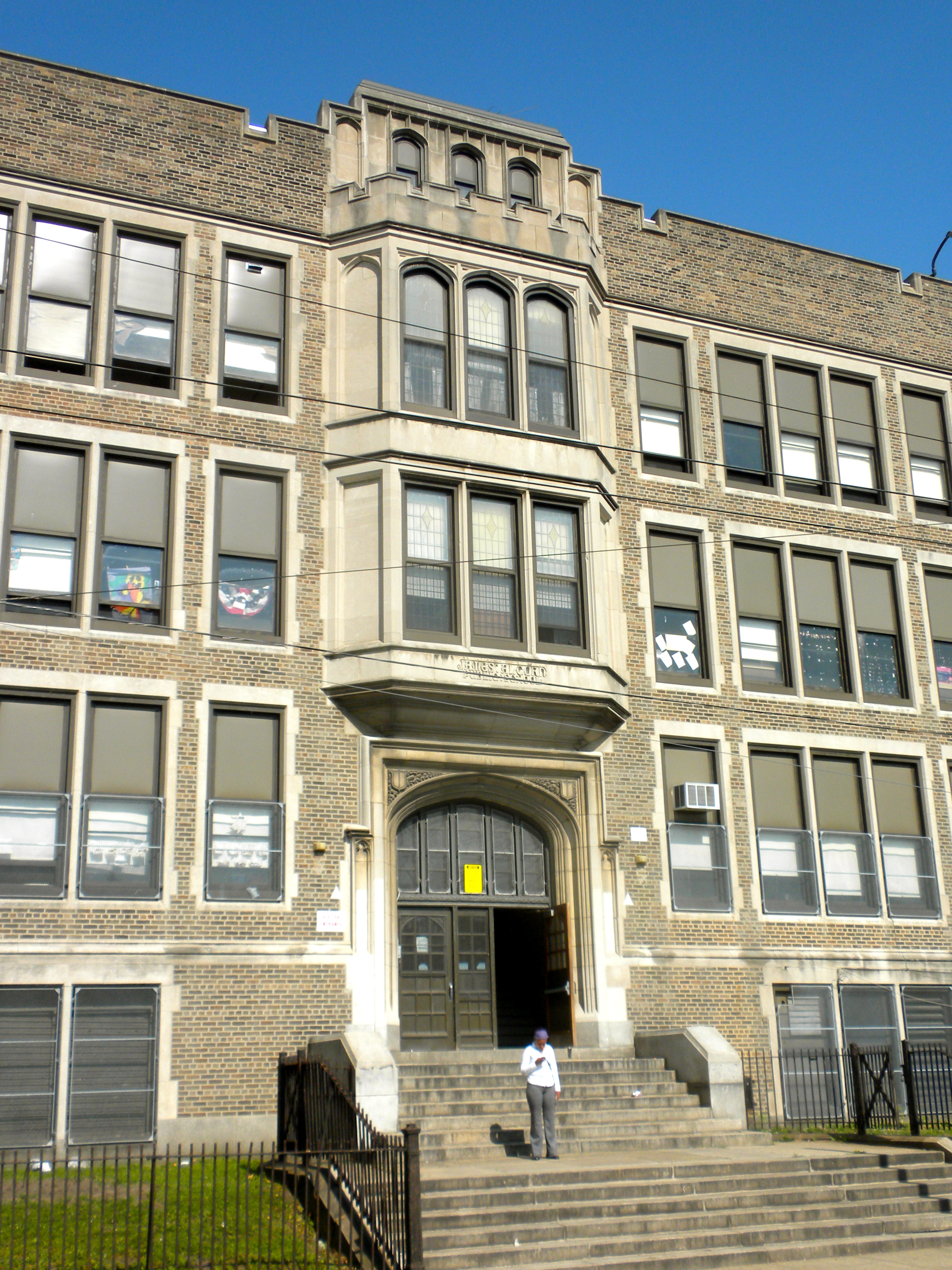
James Alcorn School elementary

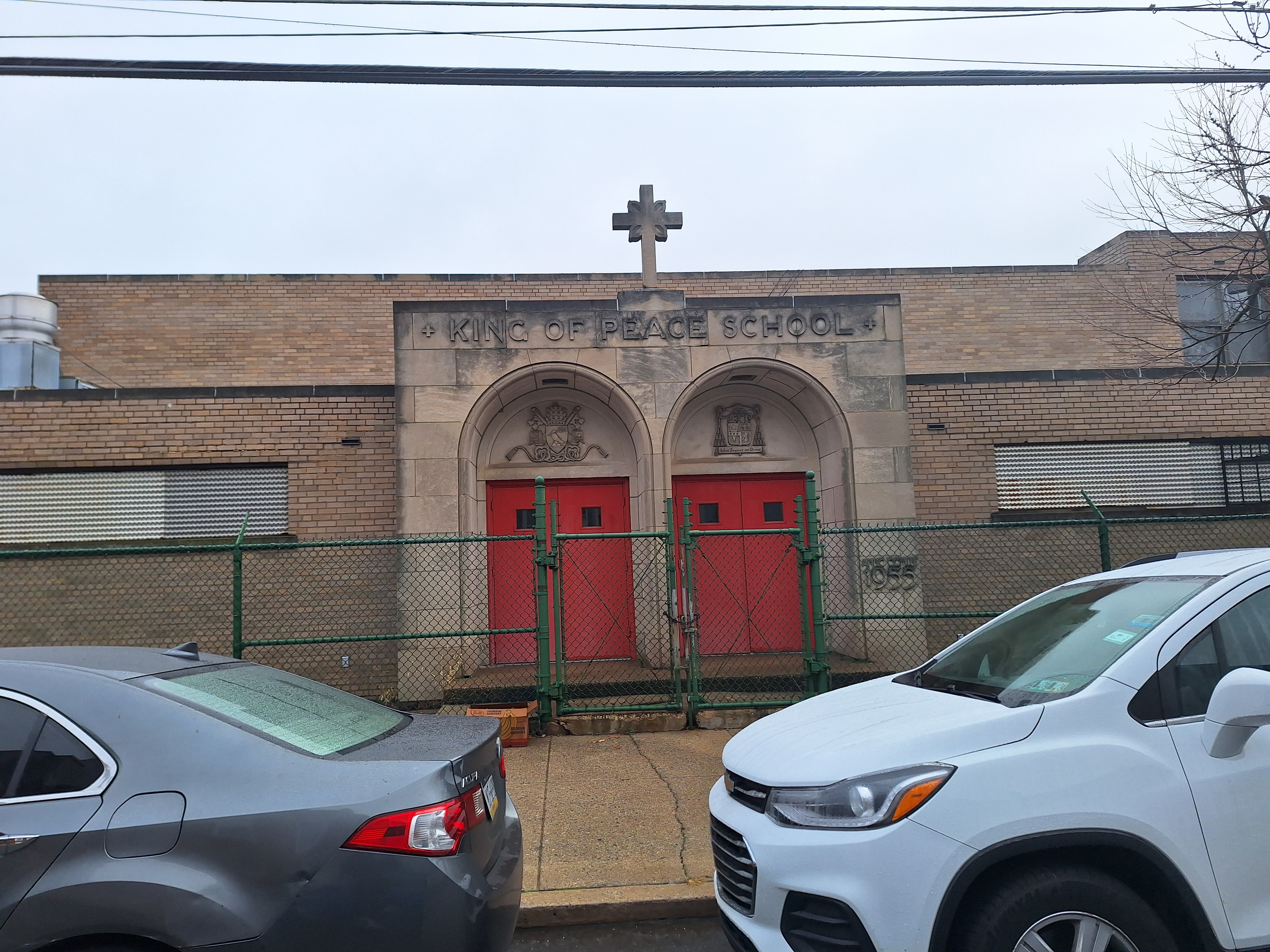
Alcorn's middle school building (formerly King of Peace School)

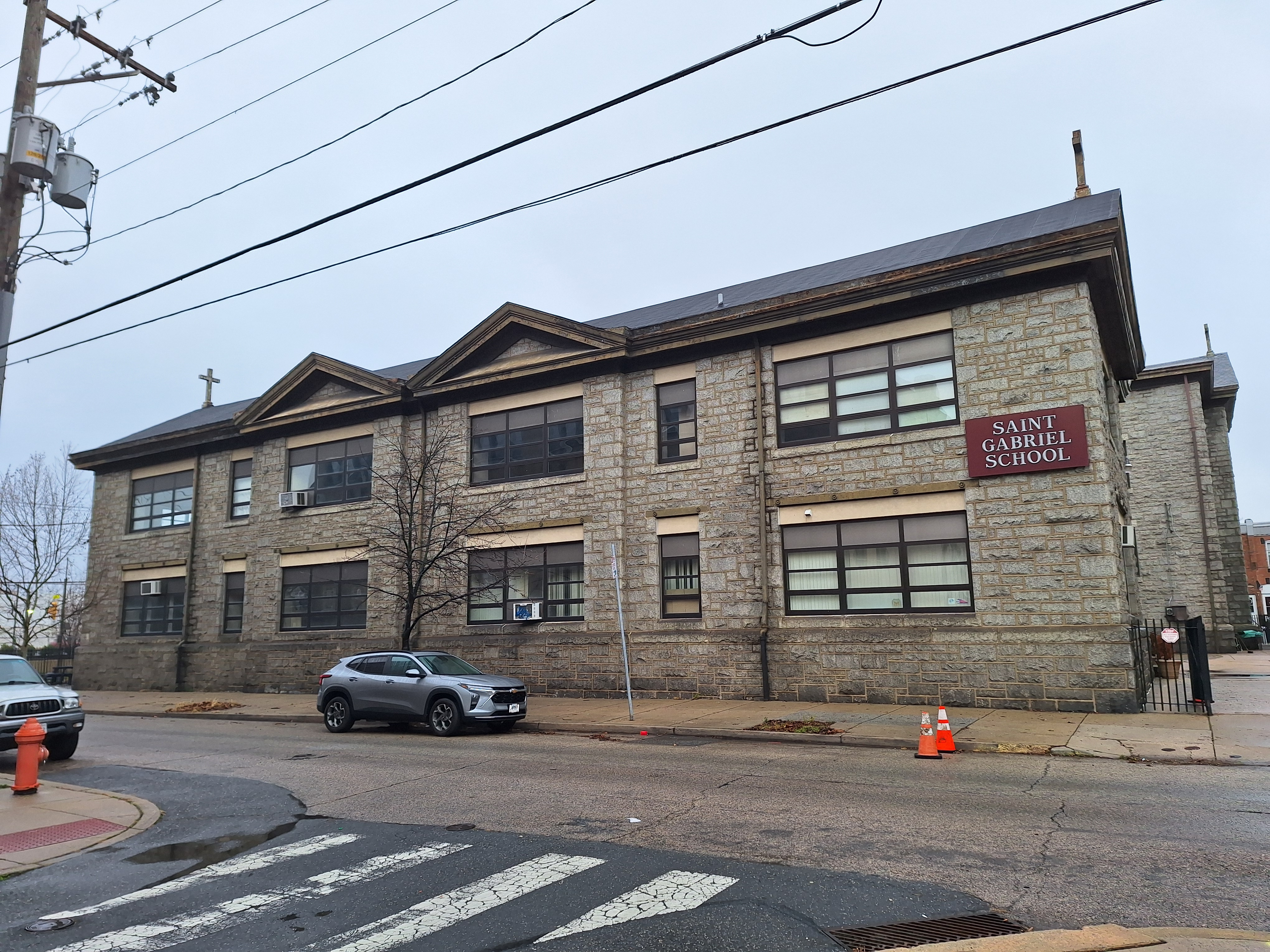
St. Gabriel School

Residents are in the School District of Philadelphia. Most of Grays Ferry is zoned to Alcorn K-8 and Audenried High School. Some parts are zoned to Delaplaine McDaniel School (K-8) and South Philadelphia High School. Some parts in the southeast are zoned to Stephen Girard Elementary, E. H. Vare Middle, and Audenried High.

Anthony Wayne School is a former school in Grays Ferry.

The Roman Catholic Archdiocese of Philadelphia operated King of Peace School until its 1999 closure; it and another school consolidated with St. Gabriel School to form Our Lady of the Angels School (at St. Gabriel). In 2012 the former King of Peace building began to be uses for Alcorn's middle school classes. The Diocese formerly operated St. Gabriel School until it became an Independence Mission School in 2012 (an action which at the time prevented its closure), and then closed completely in 2021. St. Thomas Aquinas School was to take the majority of St. Gabriel students.

== Tasker Homes and Greater Grays Ferry Estates ==
The Tasker Homes (also known as the Tasker Housing Project) were located southwest of 30th & Tasker Streets and were visible from the Schuylkill Expressway. Constructed beginning in 1939 on land that had previously been a trash dump, the development included more than 1,000 units of low‑rent public housing financed through federal programs and operated by the Philadelphia Housing Authority (PHA). Many of the buildings fell into disrepair by the late 20th century.

In 2004, Tasker Homes was demolished and replaced with the Greater Grays Ferry Estates, a mixed-income development featuring townhome-style housing, senior housing, rental units, and homeownership options. The redevelopment was part of Mayor John Street’s citywide Neighborhood Transformation Initiative (NTI), a program aimed at eliminating blighted housing and encouraging investment. While city planners praised the project, some local groups raised concerns about the scale and effects of demolition and redevelopment in Grays Ferry.

== Racial tension ==
Grays Ferry has experienced periods of racial tension and violence, particularly during the 20th century. Historical accounts describe a race riot in the Grays Ferry area in 1918, in which clashes between black and white residents resulted in multiple deaths and widespread property damage.

Tensions resurfaced in the 1990s following several high-profile incidents. In February 1997, a black family, including resident Annette Williams, was attacked by a group of white men, leading to arrests and public attention. Weeks later, Christopher Brinkman, a white teenager, was fatally shot during a robbery in the neighborhood. These incidents contributed to heightened tensions within the community. Community groups organized a march through Grays Ferry in April 1997 to protest racial violence. The Nation of Islam initially planned to participate; however, a compromise brokered by Mayor Ed Rendell led to a church rally focused on reconciliation, where Louis Farrakhan and Rendell both spoke. During the march, many white residents turned their backs as demonstrators passed, reflecting divisions within the community.

In 1998 there were two separate community organizations that were dominated by each race: Grays Ferry West among black people and Grays Ferry Community Council among white people.

As the housing market has boomed in Philadelphia, the neighborhood has begun to see some resurgence. Where the former housing projects intersect with the neighborhood, a group of neighbors have started turning an empty lot into a new park at 30th and Oakford, and the area is beginning to see a trickle of young professionals overflowing from the nearby Graduate Hospital area.

== See also ==
- Rambo's Rock
- Odunde Festival
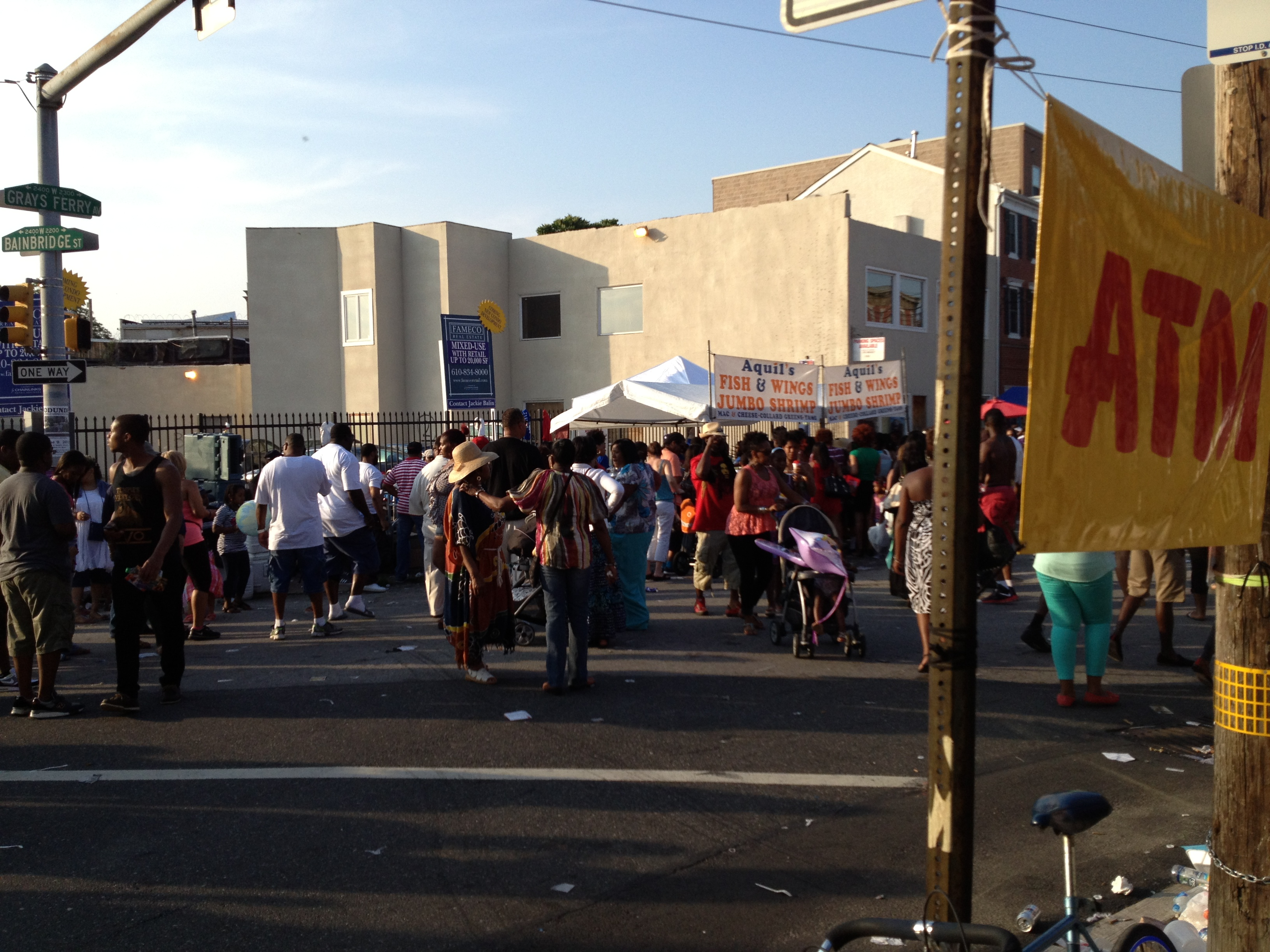
Odunde Festival 2013 on Grays Ferry Avenue
