= Universal Audenried Charter High School =

Coordinates: 39.9337°N 75.1987°W

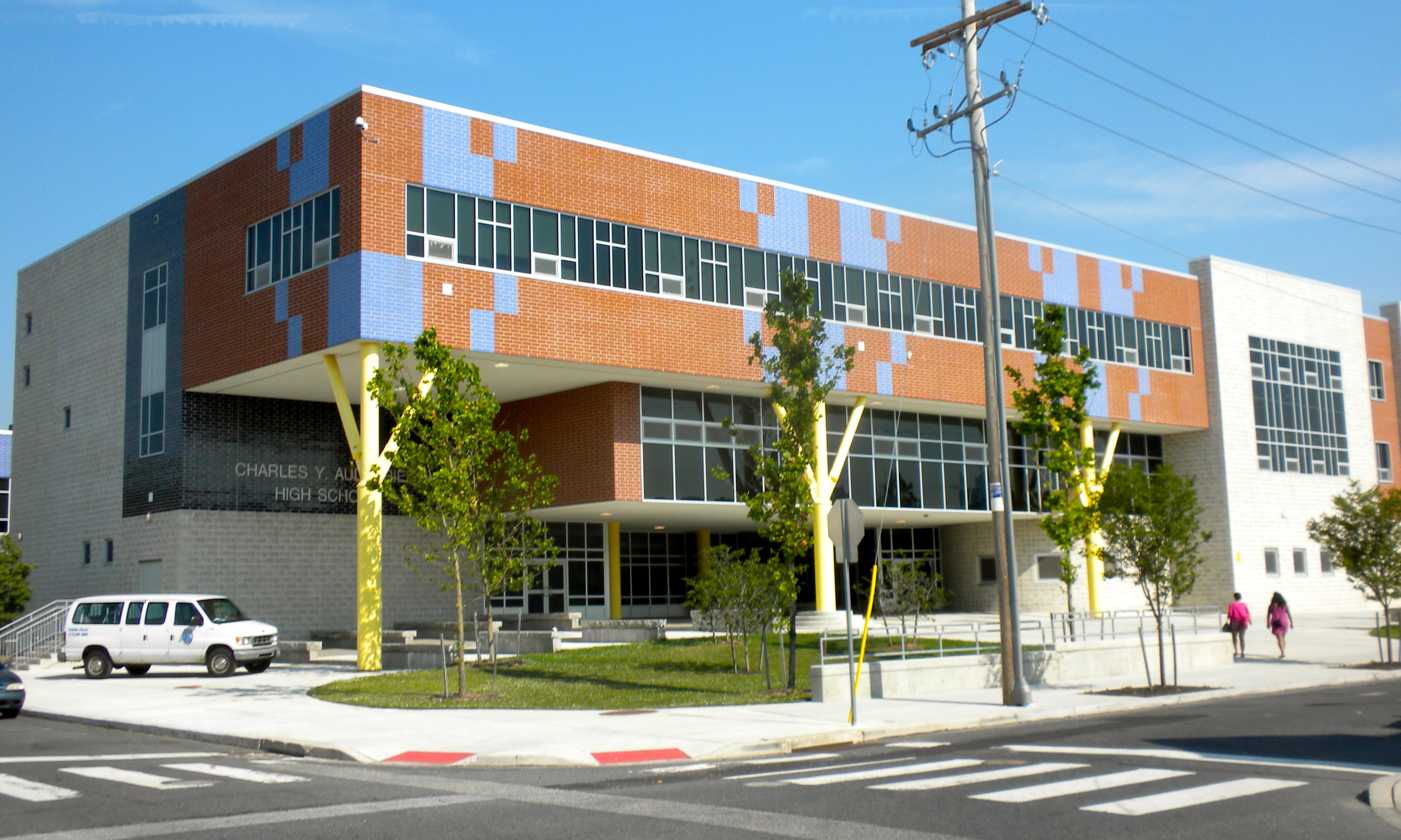
- Charles Y. Audenried High School, May 2010

Location
- 3301 Tasker Street; Philadelphia, Pennsylvania 19145; United States

Information
- Type: Public high school
- School district: Universal Companies
- Principal: Blanchard Diavua
- Staff: 39.00 (FTE)
- Grades: 9-12
- Enrollment: 608 (2017–18)
- Student to teacher ratio: 15.59
- Color
- Mascot: Rocket
- Website: www.universalfamilyofschools.org/universal-audenried

Universal Audenried Charter High School, formerly Charles Y. Audenried High School, is a high school servicing the Grays Ferry area of Philadelphia. The school was originally located at the Charles Y. Audenried Junior High School but was rebuilt in 2008. It was previously directly operated by the School District of Philadelphia. It is still a part of the district's system, and some South Philadelphia residences are assigned to Audenried.

In 2011 the School Reform Commission awarded Universal Companies the contract to operate Audenried. Several members of the community, including teachers, and students, were saying that the decision was unfair since Audenried was improving and that previous data from 2005, before the school moved into a new building, were used; more recent state test data were not available.

== Feeder patterns ==
Students zoned to the following schools are assigned to Audenried:

- Universal Alcorn Charter Elementary School (Grays Ferry) - K–8 school
- Marian Anderson Neighborhood Academy (formerly called Chester A. Arthur School) - K–8 school
- Universal Vare Charter School (formerly Edwin Vare Middle School)
- Stephen Girard Elementary School
