= Charles Y. Audenried Junior High School =

- U.S. National Register of Historic Places
- Location within Philadelphia Location within Pennsylvania Location within the United States
- Location: 1601 S. 33rd St., Philadelphia, Pennsylvania, U.S.
- Coordinates: 39°56′1″N 75°11′58″W
- Area: 4.4 acres (1.8 ha)
- Built: 1930–1931
- Architect: Irwin T. Catharine
- Architectural style: Colonial Revival
- MPS: Philadelphia Public Schools TR
- NRHP reference No.: 88002239
- Added to NRHP: November 18, 1988

Charles Y. Audenried Junior High School was a historic school building located in the Grays Ferry neighborhood of Philadelphia, Pennsylvania.

== History and features ==
Designed by Irwin T. Catharine and built in 1930-1931, it was a three-story, fifteen-bay, brick building that was erected on a raised basement in the Colonial Revival-style. It featured two projecting entrances with stone surrounds, a central entrance with four Doric order columns, projecting brick pilasters, and a brick parapet. The listed building has been demolished and replaced with the modern Universal Audenried Charter High School.

It was added to the National Register of Historic Places in 1988.

== Gallery ==
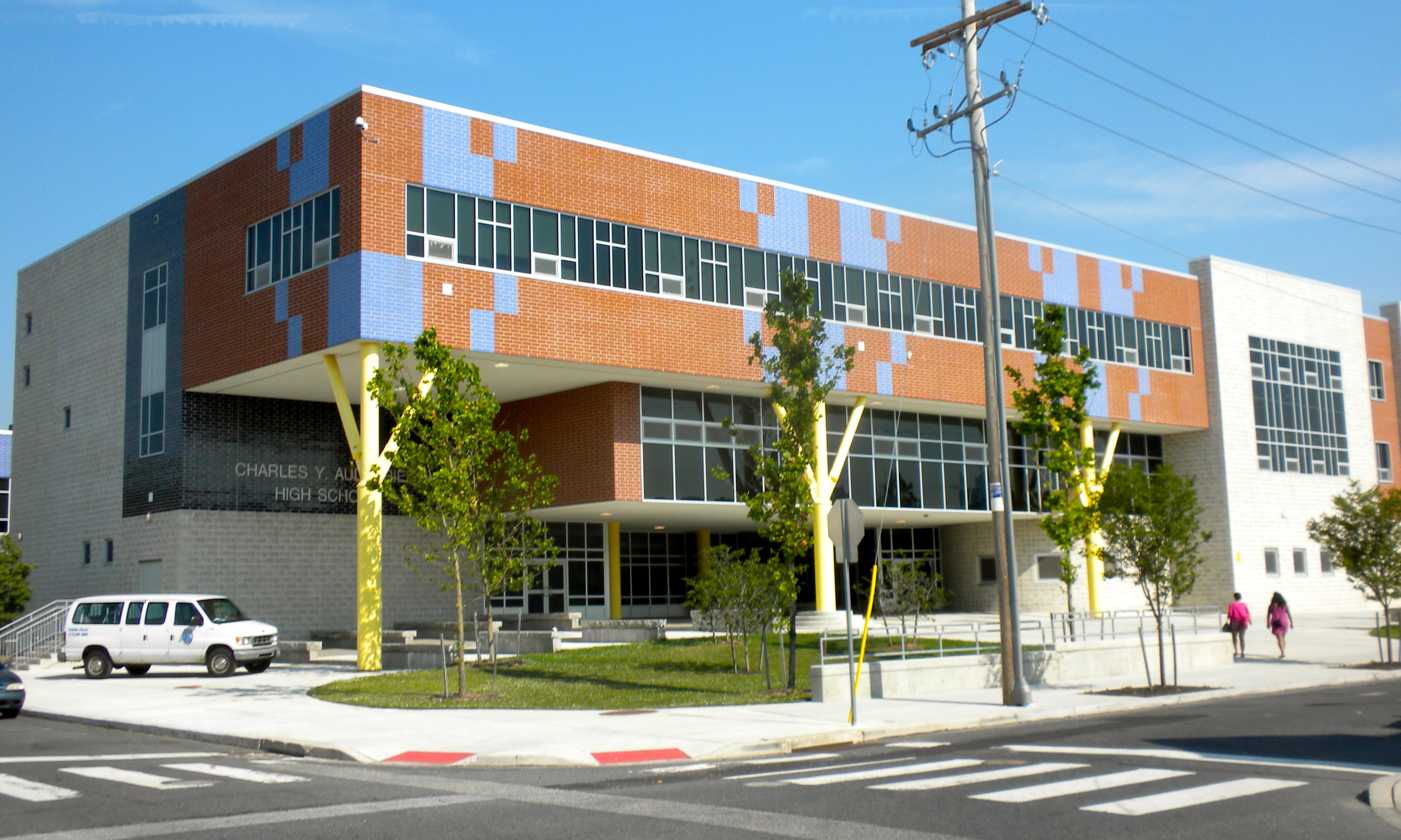
Charles Y. Audenried High School, in May 2010. The high school replaced the junior high school of the same name on the same site in 2008.
