= Grays Road Recreation Center =

- U.S. National Register of Historic Places
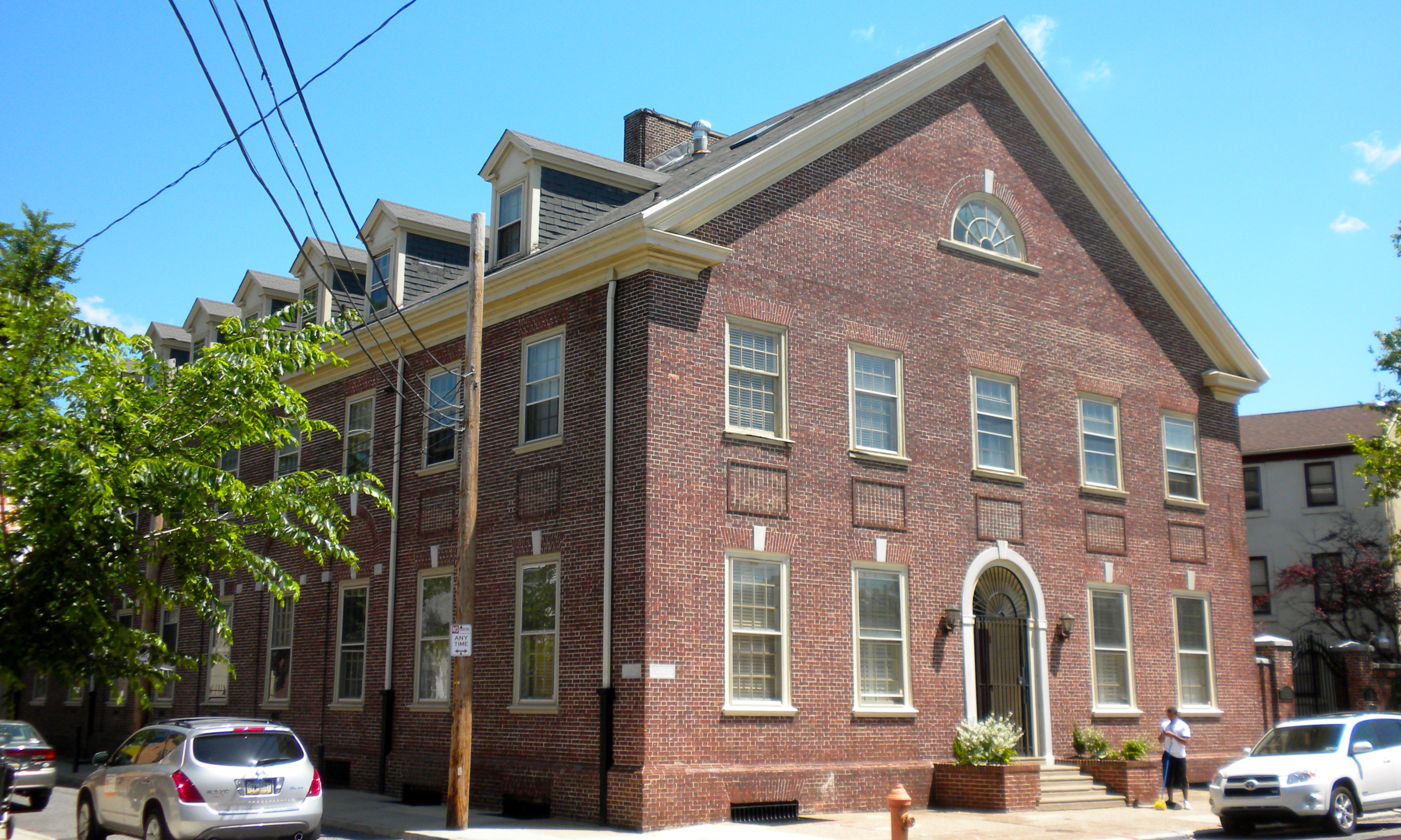
- Grays Road Recreation Center, May 2010

- Location within Philadelphia Location within Pennsylvania Location within the United States
- Location: 2501 Christian St., Philadelphia, Pennsylvania
- Coordinates: 39°56′32″N 75°11′6″W
- Area: 0.2 acres (0.081 ha)
- Built: 1926-1927
- Architect: Windrim, John T.
- Architectural style: Colonial Revival
- NRHP reference No.: 88000448
- Added to NRHP: April 21, 1988

Grays Road Recreation Center is an historic recreation center, which is located in the Grays Ferry neighborhood of Philadelphia, Pennsylvania.

It was added to the National Register of Historic Places in 1988.

== History and architectural features ==
Designed by John T. Windrim and built between 1926 and 1927, it is a two-and-one-half-story, five-bay by nine-bay, red-brick building in the Colonial Revival style.

It has a gable roof with dormers, centrally placed arched entryway with stone surround, and two internal brick chimneys. The interior features a two-story auditorium, measuring fifty feet by thirty feet.

The building was funded by the Richard Smith Family Trust.
