= Grays Ferry Bridge =

Vehicle and railroad bridges in Philadelphia, Pennsylvania

Grays Ferry Avenue Bridge
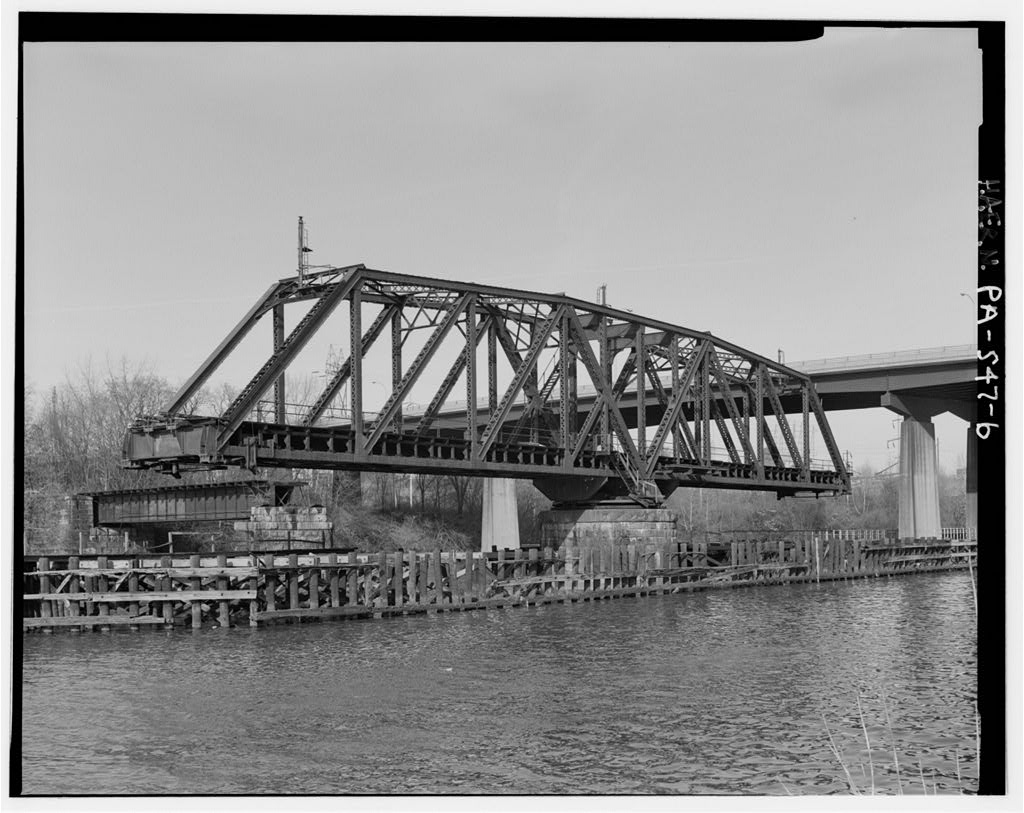
- This 1999 photo looks northwest at the Philadelphia, Wilmington & Baltimore Railroad Bridge No. 1. and, behind it, the Grays Ferry Avenue Bridge.
- Coordinates: 39.9411°N 75.205°W
- Carries: Grays Ferry Avenue
- Crosses: Schuylkill River, Northeast Corridor
- Locale: Philadelphia, Pennsylvania
- Owner: State Highway Agency
- Maintained by: State Highway Agency
- Preceded by: University Avenue Bridge
- Followed by: Philadelphia, Wilmington and Baltimore Railroad Bridge No. 1

Characteristics
- Design: Stringer/multi-beam or girder
- Material: Steel continuous
- Total length: 1,482 feet (452 m)

History
- Construction start: 1976
- Opened: 1976
- Replaces: 1901 Grays Ferry Bridge

Statistics
- Daily traffic: 9,625 (in 2011)

Location
- Interactive map of Grays Ferry Avenue Bridge

Grays Ferry Bridge (previously spelled as Gray's Ferry Bridge) has been the formal or informal name of several floating bridges and four permanent ones that have carried highway and rail traffic over the Schuylkill River in Philadelphia just below the debouchment of Mill Creek. The bridge today is a four-lane divided highway bridge, built in 1976, that carries Grays Ferry Avenue from the Grays Ferry neighborhood on the east bank, over the river and the Northeast Corridor railroad tracks, to the Southwest Philadelphia neighborhood of Kingsessing.

In 1902, rail traffic was shifted to the adjacent Philadelphia, Wilmington and Baltimore Railroad Bridge No. 1, whose truss was demolished in 2018 and replaced in 2026 by a new truss for use by cyclists and pedestrians traveling the Schuylkill River Trail.

== Ferry ==
Before bridges crossed the Schuylkill, three ferries provided the main connections between Philadelphia and points west and south. Two of them crossed the river in or near the city limits:

- Upper, or Sculls, Ferry, near the present-day Spring Garden Street Bridge.
- Middle Ferry, near today's Market Street Bridge.

The third, dubbed Lower Ferry, crossed south of the city proper and just south of the mouth of Mill Creek. It was likely established in 1673 or shortly thereafter by Benjamin Chambers, who was licensed to operate the ferry after Swedish settlers complained that they were blocked from passage on the Middle Ferry.

In 1696, the colonial government directed that two roads be laid out from either end of the Lower Ferry, also called Chambers' Ferry: one from the east landing north to Philadelphia, and the other westward toward Darby, Pennsylvania. The ferry thereby came to connect Philadelphia to the Darby Road (now Woodland Avenue at 47th Street), which was part of the King's Highway, the main land route to Delaware, Baltimore, and the southern colonies. It remained virtually the only conduit to the city from points south until 1781, when the construction of a federal road connected the ferry environs to Market Street in what would become West Philadelphia.

It was still marked as "Lower Ferry" on a 1753 map, but it would soon take the name of its new proprietors, the brothers Robert and George Gray. George (1725–1800) owned large tracts of land near the ferry's eastern landing (in today's Grays Ferry neighborhood of South Philadelphia) and in 1787 would become a signatory to Pennsylvania's ratification of the U.S. Constitution.

== Floating bridges ==
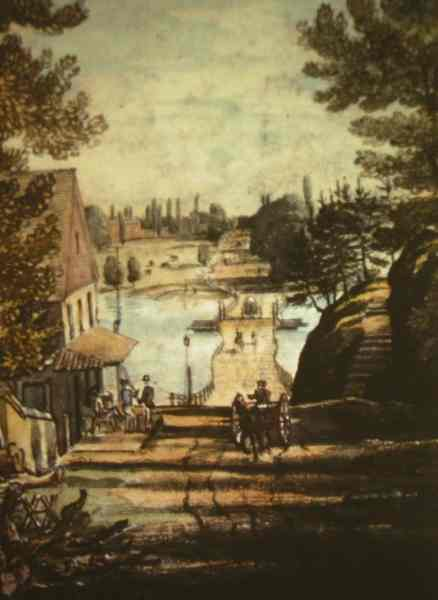
From 1777 and through at least 1839, a series of floating bridges offered passage at Gray's, or Lower, Ferry. 1816 painting by Joshua Rowley Watson

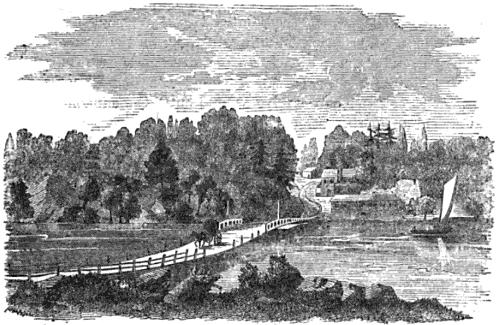
1856 drawing of the floating bridges that were replaced in 1838.

The first bridge across the Schuylkill River was a pontoon bridge built in 1777 by British troops occupying the city. Its construction was anticipated on the American side by General John Armstrong, Sr. of the Pennsylvania militia, who wrote on October 8, "I think they will also throw a bridge of some sort over Grey's Ferry, not only to maintain a communication with but secure a retreat to their shipping."

Armstrong was right. The bridge's preparation and construction were described by Captain John Montresor, the engineer on the staff of General William Howe:

- October 17, 1777 — This day principally employed in my department in transporting the materials for the Bridge of Schuylkill at Gray's Ferry together with its boats.
- 18th — The utmost preparation making to forward the Bridge at Gray's Ferry across Schuylkill.
- 20th — At half past 10 this morning the engineers finished the floating Bridge across Schuylkill of 400 feet.

But this bridge remained in place only two days, as British commanders decided that the extra fording capacity was better used farther north. Montresor wrote, "22nd — At 3 o' clock p.m., the works for the tete du pont at Gray's Ferry ordered to be stopt and the Detacht. to return and the bridge to be taken up and carried to Middle Ferry." (He and his men completed this bridge on October 24, only to see it wash away four days later by "the N.E. Stormy High tide and rapid stream and Ebb tide together." A replacement floating-log bridge at Middle Ferry was passable by November 10 and completed on November 11.)

Back at Lower Ferry, a new floating bridge was once again in place by December 10, according to diary entries by British Army officer John André, who would go on to be the Army's chief of intelligence. On December 22, a large British force moved westward across the bridge and camped three miles from Darby. On December 28, the bridge was pulled up, perhaps to protect it from winter ice, as the Army moved north to cross back into the city at the Middle Ferry bridge.

The British rebuilt the bridge at Gray's Ferry in the spring of 1778, and left it intact when they withdrew from the city that June. On August 7, 1778, the Supreme Executive Council of the Commonwealth of Pennsylvania wrote to the Pennsylvania General Assembly, saying, "In the course of the war it has been found useful to lay a bridge across the Schuylkill at this city. Another bridge over that river was erected by General Washington at Providence [near Valley Forge] in this county. And a third built by the enemy [the Gray's Ferry bridge] remains entire. It is worthy of consideration how these truly convenient structures may be rendered lastingly useful. The terms on which they may be passed ought to be settled." Later that year, the deal was set: the U.S. government would pay 800 pounds annually for the maintenance of the bridge.

Ice smashed the bridge to pieces in 1780, leading the Council to pay Major Benjamin Eyre 7,500 pounds to rebuild it. The rebuilt bridge featured a deck over planks attached to the logs, with anchors in mid-stream to steady it and railings for safety. Flexible, it rose and fell with the tide. Heavy wagons often depressed the deck a few inches below the water. A 1796 traveler wrote, "Although this bridge floated when not charged, or charged but lightly, the weight of our waggon depressed it several inches below the surface, the horses splashing through the water so that a foot passenger passing at the same time would have been exposed to serious inconvenience." The bridge had a draw that could be lifted with ropes to allow boats to pass by. The whole span could be unmoored and allowed to float downstream in times of ice or heavy weather, then restored to service.

The advantages of a permanent bridge were clear, but none would be built for several decades. In 1806, a "Gray's Ferry Bridge Company" was chartered, but it bore no fruit.

In 1828, Martin Kochersperger noted that 304 vessels passed through the bridge in the month of March: 37 schooners, 106 sloops and shallops, 28 oyster boats, 98 curial boats, 16 fishing boats, seven pleasure boats, and 12 rafts.

In 1834, a Philadelphia guidebook offered this description, "Gray's Ferry — renowned as the junketing place of our forefathers where our grandfathers and grandmothers danced and sung where the scenery has a right pleasant smack of the antique about it and where the floating bridge still swings as it did in the days of the revolution."

=== Notable crossings ===
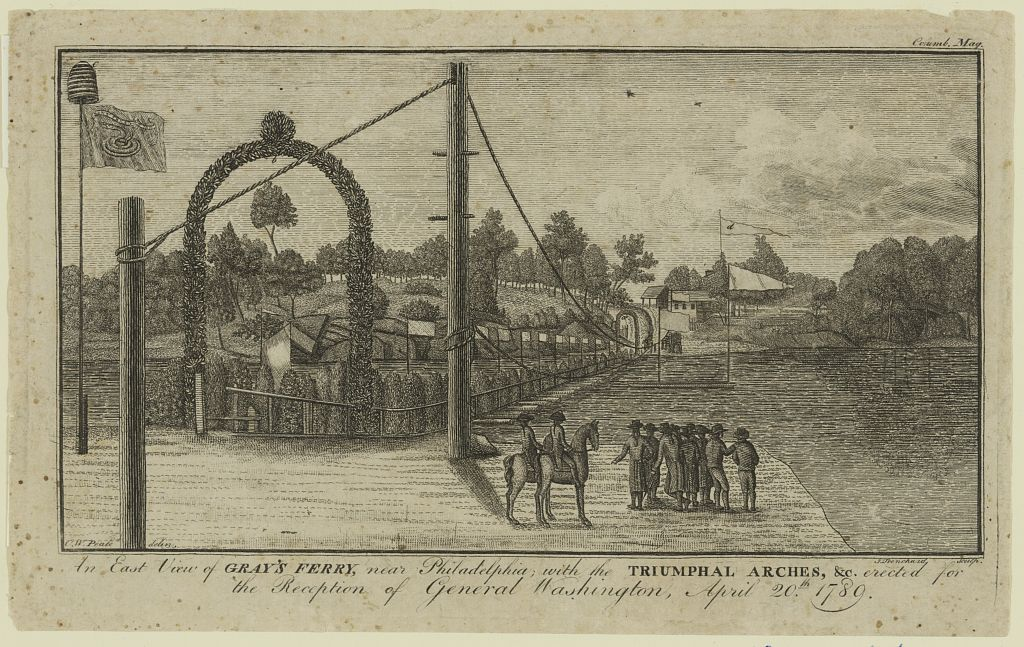
The pontoon bridge at Gray's Ferry was decorated for the arrival of President-elect George Washington in Philadelphia on April 20, 1789. A rope line indicates the continuing use of a ferryboat alongside the bridge.

During the 1787 Constitutional Convention, many delegates eager to escape the hot and humid city crossed the bridge on day trips to visit Gray's Ferry Tavern or Bartram's Garden a bit farther south.

George Washington, who is likely to have used the ferry or its successor bridges whenever he traveled from his home in Mount Vernon, Virginia, to Philadelphia and points north, is known to have crossed the floating bridge at Gray's Ferry on at least two occasions. On May 13, 1787, Washington wrote about his arrival in Philadelphia for the convention to revise the Articles of Confederation: "At Grays Ferry the City light horse commanded by Colo. Miles met me, and escorted me in by the Artillery Officers who stood arranged & saluted me as I passed." On April 20, 1789, when Washington traveled to New York City, then the national capital, to become the first president of the United States, the bridge was decorated for the latter occasion by the Grays, who enlisted the aid of Philadelphia artist Charles Willson Peale, with laurel arches and the flags of the states and the new country.

== Permanent bridges ==
=== Newkirk Viaduct (1838-1902) ===
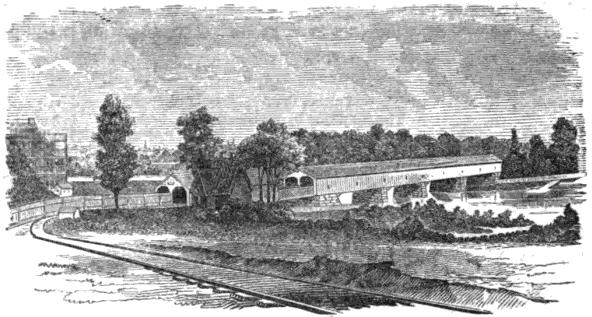
An 1856 drawing of the 1838 railroad-and-highway Newkirk Viaduct

In 1831, the Pennsylvania legislature chartered a new company to build a rail line from Philadelphia to the Delaware state line. A survey of routes was begun in July 1835, and the following year, company officials settled a debate over just how and where to cross the Schuylkill: a permanent bridge at Gray's Ferry. The firm, by now renamed The Philadelphia, Wilmington and Baltimore Railroad Company, bought the necessary land on December 31, 1836.

Over the next two years, the railroad built an 800-foot covered truss bridge supported by five piers; its fifth span, as counted from the east, could be pulled into its sixth span to allow boats to pass. A single track ran along the bridge's southern side, separated by a fence from a roadway that ran along its northern side. The cost, including construction and land acquisition, came to nearly $200,000. The railroad named the bridge for its president, Matthew Newkirk (1794–1868), a Philadelphia business and civic leader, and erected an obelisk, the Newkirk Viaduct Monument, along its western approach.

Construction on the rest of the 17 miles of track proceeded, and when the bridge opened in 1838, it was the final link in the first direct rail service between Philadelphia and Wilmington. It did not initially allow locomotives to pass, nor were locomotives particularly welcomed on city streets, so the cars were pulled by horses over the river and northward along three miles of track to the terminus of the PW&B. That was the Southern and Western Railroad Station, a grand six-track station and PW&B office building erected in 1840 at Broad Street and Washington Avenue (the former Prime Avenue).

The new bridge was less than a year old when it was severely damaged. On January 26, 1839, historian Daniel Bowen wrote that a "great ice freshet ... swept away one of the piers and two of its sections. The floating bridge at Gray's Ferry was also carried away by the violence of the same flood. We are happy to learn that all the damages occurring from that rapid rise of the Schuylkill are in rapid progress of repair and that both the bridges are now passable." (It is not clear when the floating bridge finally ceased to exist.) The damage was repaired within weeks for less than $15,000.

A toll was charged for road traffic until 1847, when Philadelphia County paid the PW&B $50,000 to eliminate the tolls. The deal also bound the railroad to rebuild the bridge if necessary.

In June 1846, the Viaduct was chosen as the route for the telegraph line that completing the first telecommunications link from New York to Washington; operators complained of interruptions whenever the draw was opened. In 1852, the bridge was strengthened to handle more weight, and steam power at last replaced horses.

On November 11, 1854, a passing steamboat damaged the bridge. A temporary platform was quickly erected to carry traffic, and a large work crew set about making repairs.

During the Civil War, the PW&B's Philadelphia terminal became the great embarkation and debarkation point for Philadelphia men going to and returning from war in the southern states. On December 23, 1863, a fire — perhaps started by a locomotive's sparks — damaged an eastern span of the bridge, and firefighters intentionally destroyed the draw section to protect the western part. The bridge was rebuilt as a Town lattice truss that was left uncovered. In 1865, the bridge was cited by the U.S. Supreme Court in Gilman v. Philadelphia, which upheld the power of Congress to regulate interstate commerce, including navigable streams in a particular state.

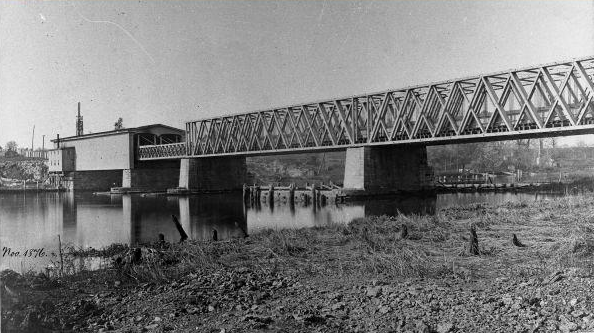
1876 photo looks northwest at the Newkirk Viaduct.

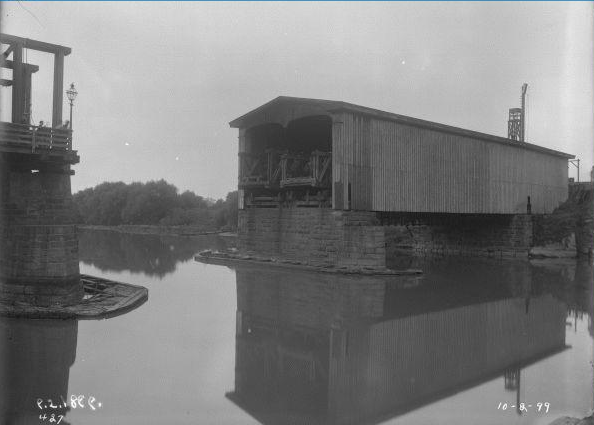
1899 photo looks southwest at the western end of the Newkirk Viaduct with the draw span retracted.

By 1889, the Newkirk Viaduct was a four-span, 503-foot bridge, including a 92-foot Howe truss span with a 144-foot cover.

The several acres around the Viaduct's western end had become a hub of railroad activity. The area had had an enginehouse since the Viaduct opened; by 1876, a bigger, eight-stall roundhouse had been erected. By 1877, passenger trains stopped at the Gray's Ferry station, on 49th Street between Grays and Paschall Streets. Here, northbound express trains from Washington, Baltimore, or Wilmington and heading farther north would be switched from PW&B tracks to the Junction Railroad and on to the PRR's Philadelphia depot, allowing their passengers to continue their journey without switching trains.

In 1873, the route south of the bridge was shifted somewhat away from the riverbank as far as Chester, a shift that drew the tracks away from marshy ground and eliminated several drawbridges from the route. The first train ran over this Darby Improvement route on May 12.

The Viaduct's importance as a rail bridge waned after 1880-81, when the Pennsylvania Railroad took control of the PW&B. The PRR, whose passenger trains ran through West Philadelphia, used the Viaduct only to run freight to the Delaware River docks via Washington Street, while the Baltimore & Ohio, which had previously run trains over the bridge, was forced to build its own bridge one-third of a mile to the south.

A new draw span was constructed in 1891, but maintenance remained difficult for the rest of the decade. Moreover, the city of Philadelphia itched for a broader bridge to carry trolley and other street traffic between the rapidly developing neighborhoods of Grays Ferry and Kingsessing.

=== Grays Ferry Bridge (1901-76) ===
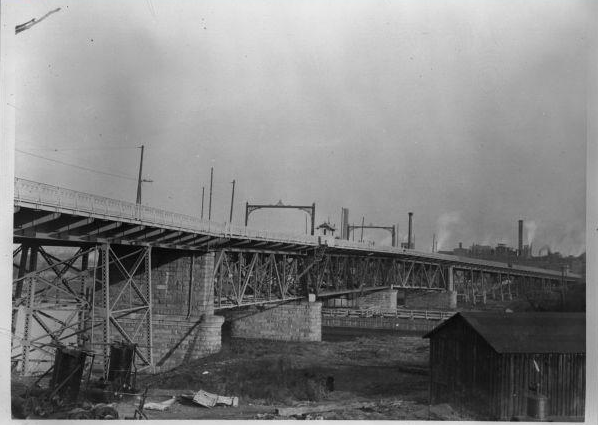
The 1901 Grays Ferry Bridge replaced the non-railroad functions of the Newkirk Viaduct. It carried automotive traffic and streetcars.

By the end of the 19th century, the narrow Newkirk Viaduct was a roadway bottleneck. "Much of the traffic that would naturally cross the river at Gray's Ferry has been diverted to the South Street bridge because of the congested conditions that exist from morning until night at the railroad crossing," wrote the Philadelphia Record in 1900. "The steep incline at the western end of the old bridge has always been an obstacle to heavily-laden wagons, and at times during the day the crush of teams is actually dangerous." In December 1896, the city of Philadelphia appropriated $400,000 to build the new Grays Ferry Bridge (it ultimately cost about $475,000). The appropriation was authorized by ordinance the following April.

The stonework was completed in December 1898 by Jutte and Foley Company of Pittsburgh for $250,000. The five river piers were excavated to bedrock, as were most of the bridge's abutments and pedestals. The masonry was "rockfaced ashlar, with coping and bridge seats of Port Deposit granite."

The metal superstructure, plus a timber fender on the eastern side of the west draw channel and a cluster of wooden pilings at the north end of the west draw pier, were built by the Phoenix Bridge Company, which completed its work on March 1, 1901, under a $145,959.98 contract. The pavement, railings, and "other appurtenances" were completed May 20, by the Alcatraz Paving Company for $66,870.

The bridge was 1,190 feet long, including 1,660 feet of metal superstructure, with a 36-foot-wide roadway and two 10-foot-wide sidewalks. It also held two trolley tracks belonging to the Union Traction Company, "connecting the Spruce and Pine streets division with the Darby lines on Woodland Avenue at Gray's Ferry road." The west end was far higher than the old Newkirk Viaduct, for it crossed over the 14-track PW&B railyard. River traffic was accommodated by a 223-foot, 6-inch swing span that allowed 75 feet of open water to each side of its central pier. The span could open in just one minute, thanks to electric motors powered by cables under the river (a backup system required 12 men to crank for 10 minutes against "a moderate wind"), although its 22-foot clearance allowed police and fireboats to pass without opening.

The bridge opened on March 9, 1901, releasing the railroad from the obligation to maintain the highway portion of its Newkirk Viaduct, and the PW&B promptly closed the road. Under the deal, the railroad gave back the $55,000 it had received for perpetual maintenance under the agreement of 1847, and $20,000 for city-funded improvements to the Viaduct over the years.

By January 1, 1902, the draw had been opened 2,653 times for the passage of 4,969 ships and boats.

A 1902 U.S. Geologic Survey report called the area "Grays Ferry" without the apostrophe.

By 1972, the aging bridge had seen several deadly accidents in which vehicles had "crashed through the rail," Leopold Neiman, the city's chief bridge engineer, told the Philadelphia Inquirer. "The bridge is seriously deteriorated, badly corroded and its alignment is very hazardous for modern traffic." It was to be demolished in December 1972, as soon as the state of Pennsylvania could process contracts awarded to-Buckley and Co., and traffic diverted to the 34th Street bridge while a replacement was constructed.

=== PW&B No. 1 (1902-2018) ===
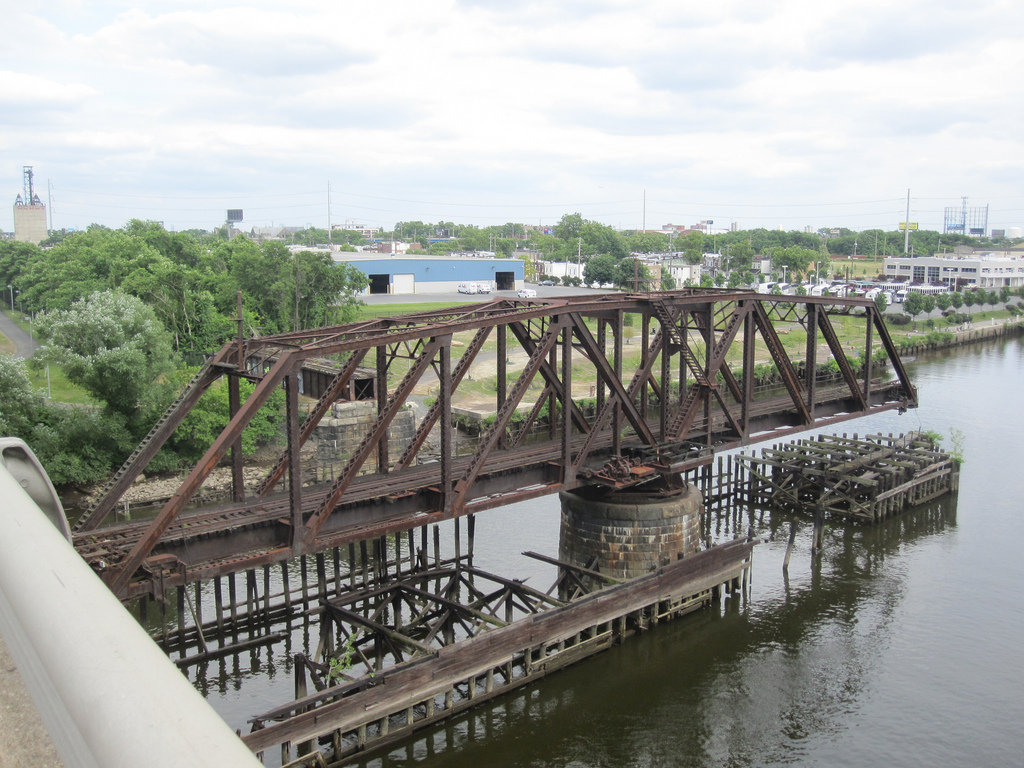
PW&B Bridge No. 1, shown here in 2011, replaced the Newkirk Viaduct for rail traffic in 1902.

The railroad promptly began construction of a one-track bridge, completed in October 1902. This bridge has a 226-foot-7-inch (69.1 m) swing span pivoting on a cylindrical stone pier at mid-stream, flanked by a 97-foot-9 3/8-inch (29.8 m) approach span on either side. A wooden pile fender protects the pivot pier and the opened swing span from collisions with boat traffic on the river.

On April 14, 1945, the funeral train carrying the body of President Franklin D. Roosevelt passed over the bridge, where mourners gathered to watch its passage.

In 1976, Conrail abandoned the bridge shortly after it acquired the Pennsylvania Railroad properties and left it permanently open. An unknown party purchased the bridge in 1987. For decades, the bridge and the fender pilings sat unused and deteriorating.

In 2012, Philadelphia Mayor Michael Nutter proposed to return the bridge to service as a part of the Schuylkill River Trail, a bike trail. In 2017, Conrail and CSX transferred ownership of the bridge to the City of Philadelphia, which plans a $13 million project to replace the truss with a bike-trail structure.

On August 23, 2018, the bridge's truss and superstructure were demolished, leaving the pilings as a foundation for the planned bike-pedestrian bridge. Construction was delayed several times, and the 415-foot bridge was opened on 13 November 2026, 14 years after its proposal and eight years since construction began. It is the country's only operational swing bridge dedicated to trail use.

=== Grays Ferry Avenue Bridge (1976-present) ===
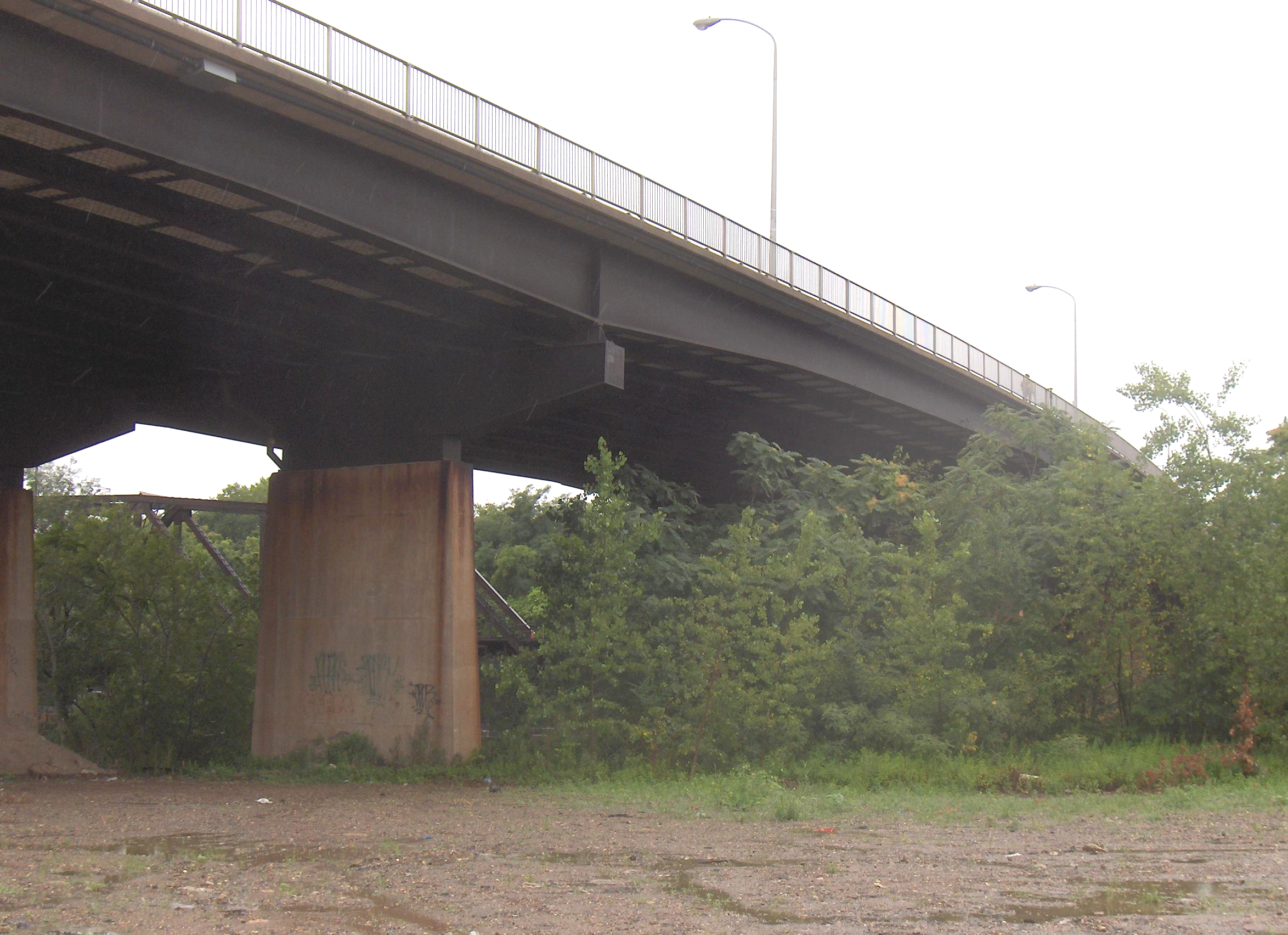
The Grays Ferry Avenue Bridge in July 2010

In 1972, the city's streets department announced plans to demolish the four-lane 1901 road bridge and replace it with a modern six-lane structure. The $10.6 million bridge, to be erected between the old road bridge and the PW&B railroad bridge, was to be completed in 1975. Built by the Pennsylvania State Highway Agency, the new Grays Ferry Bridge actually opened in 1976.

The 1,482-foot (452 m) bridge carries Grays Ferry Avenue across the river and the Northeast Corridor main line. Built of steel girders, it has four traffic lanes and two pedestrian sidewalks. There are also "painted, unbuffered bike lanes, but high prevailing speeds on the immediately adjacent motor vehicle lanes and significant debris in the bike lanes make the bike lanes uncomfortable for many bicyclists," said a 2012 City of Philadelphia report.

In 2007, PennDOT recorded average daily traffic volume of around 30,000 motor vehicles.

In late 2018, PennDOT launched a two-year, $13.3 million project to rehab the bridge. The work was designed by Modjeski and Masters of Philadelphia, carried out by Buckley & Company of Philadelphia, and managed by TRC Solutions of Lancaster, Pennsylvania. The work included "extensive rehabilitation work began on the bridge, including "repairing the structure and substructure of the bridge, replacing expansion joints, resurfacing the bridge deck, and milling and paving the approaches on Grays Ferry Avenue from 48th Street to 35th Street." A 10-foot, barrier‐separated lane for cyclists and pedestrians was created on the eastbound side of the bridge.

== See also ==
- List of bridges documented by the Historic American Engineering Record in Pennsylvania
- List of crossings of the Schuylkill River
- The Woodlands Cemetery
