= Anthony Wayne School =

- U.S. National Register of Historic Places
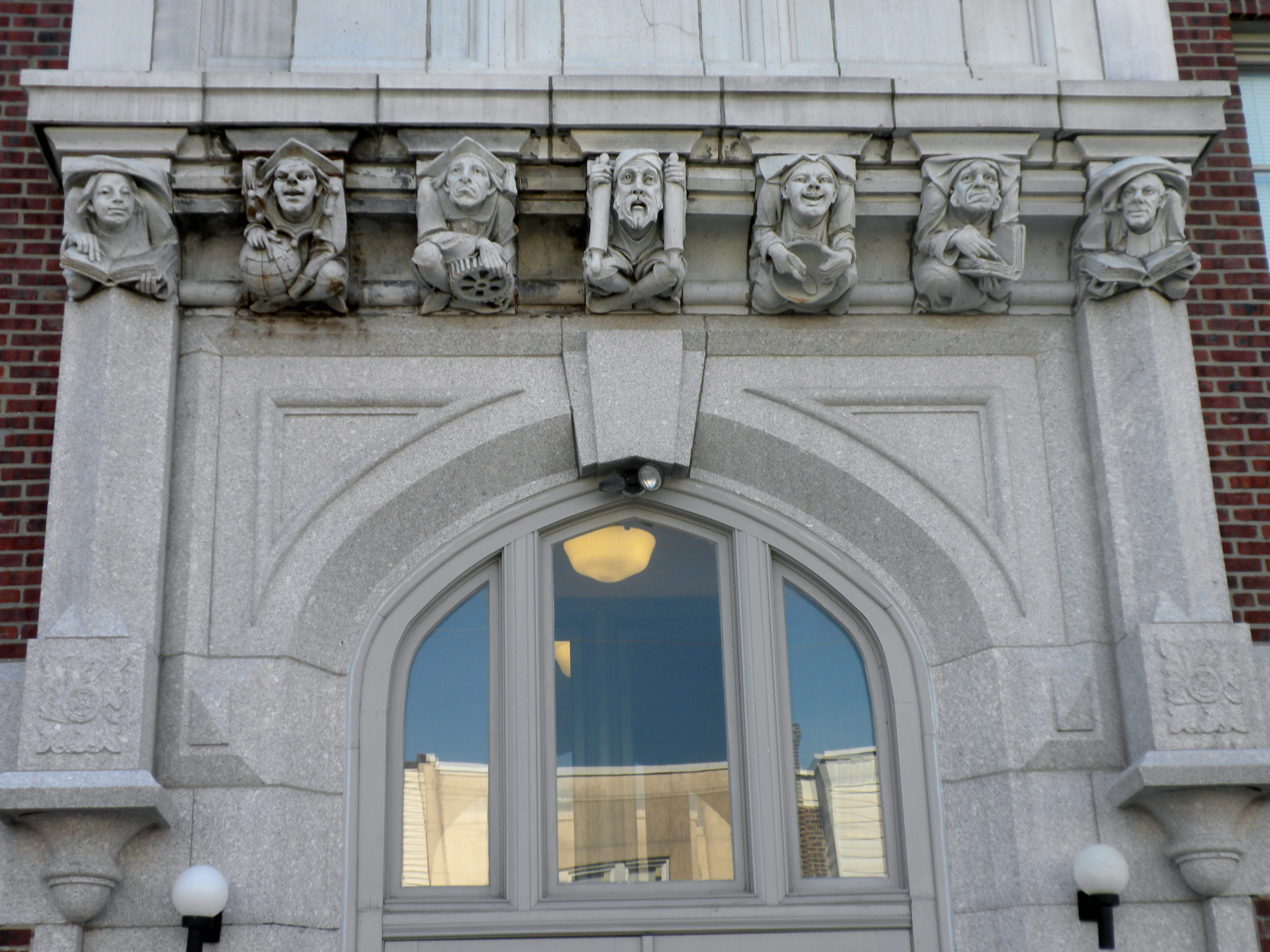
- Anthony Wayne School entrance, May 2010

- Location within Philadelphia Location within Pennsylvania Location within the United States
- Location: 1701 S. 28th St., Philadelphia, Pennsylvania, United States
- Coordinates: 39°55′53″N 75°11′28″W
- Area: 1 acre (0.40 ha)
- Built: 1908–1909
- Architect: Henry deCoursey Richards
- Architectural style: Late Gothic Revival, Academic Gothic
- MPS: Philadelphia Public Schools TR
- NRHP reference No.: 86003344
- Added to NRHP: December 1, 1986

The Anthony Wayne School is a historic former school building located in the Grays Ferry neighborhood of Philadelphia, Pennsylvania, United States. It was designed by Henry deCoursey Richards and built between 1908 and 1909.

Named for United States Army general and statesman Anthony Wayne (1745–1786), the building was added to the National Register of Historic Places in 1986.

== History and features ==
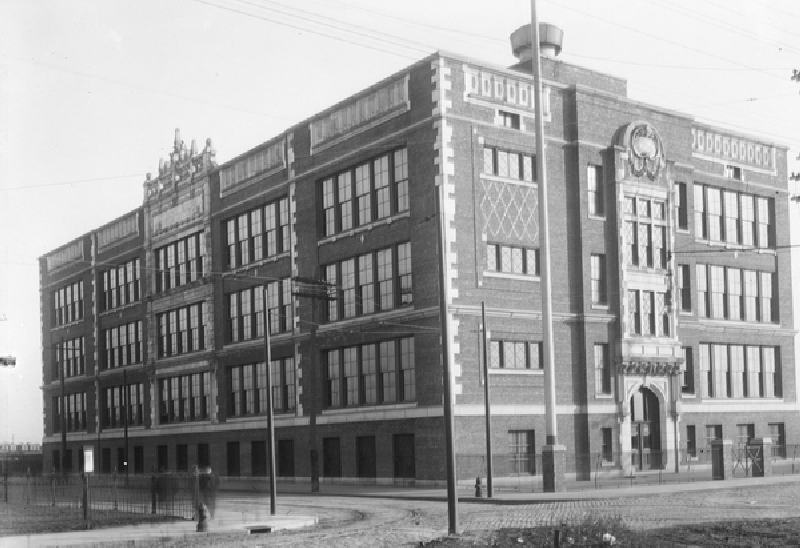
Anthony Wayne School in 1914 (photograph by Franklin D. Edmunds)

Designed by Henry deCoursey Richards, the Anthony Wayne School was built between 1908 and 1909.

A four-story, five-bay, reinforced concrete building, clad in brick and designed in the Late Gothic Revival-style, it features a projecting entrance with terra cotta ornament, a projecting multi-story terra cotta bay, terra cotta decorative panels and a parapet. The school was named for United States Army general and statesman Anthony Wayne (1745–1786).

The school district stopped maintaining the building in 1976. The School District of Philadelphia closed the building in 1981, and in 1987 Geriatric & Medical Centers (Geri-Med) purchased the building with plans to make a nursing home. However by 1993 the project had not started and the condition of the facility had deteriorated. According to Geri-Med, by 1994, the municipal government had not yet issued the necessary permits.

The building was added to the National Register of Historic Places in 1986.

In 1995 there was a proposal to demolish the school.

It is now used as senior housing. Redevelopment began in 2003, and there were a total of 39 units made. That phase ended in 2005. New construction made up the other phases, with the last completed in 2018. Kenyatta Adams, a member of the Philadelphia City Council, assisted with the project.
