= David J. Kennedy (painter) =

American painter

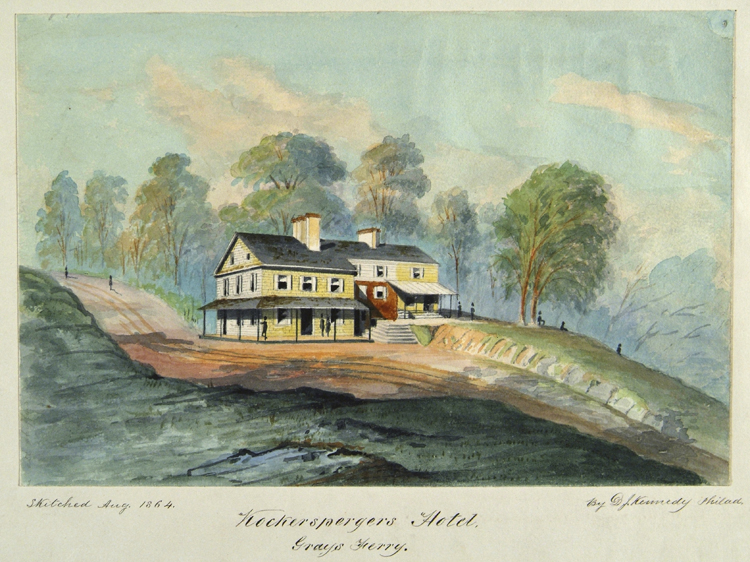
The inn at Gray's Ferry, as painted by David J. Kennedy in August 1864.

David Johnston Kennedy (1816-1898) was a railroad agent and amateur painter who produced more than 1,000 watercolors of Philadelphia. His works are valued by historians as images of a past era.

Born in Port Mullin, Scotland, Kennedy worked various jobs, including as a stonecutter, and took a few painting lessons. In 1833, his family emigrated to Ontario, Canada. Two years later, he moved to Philadelphia, and stayed briefly with his married sister. In 1836, he moved again to Nashville, Tennessee, where he worked for a dry goods store and practiced painting, mostly miniatures, in his spare time. But he soon fell ill, and returned to Philadelphia, and then to Canada in 1837. After recovering, he moved back to Philadelphia, where he married Morgianna Corbin, the granddaughter of noted physician Benjamin Say. His wife's connections found him a job as a clerk in the new office of the Philadelphia and Reading Railroad at Broad and Cherry Streets. He worked for the Reading for more than two decades, rising to be a purchasing and general agent. Failing eyesight forced him to retire in 1861, but he continued to paint until his death.

During his half-century of painting, he captured grand houses, railroads, street scenes, and other buildings in and around Philadelphia; of particular note are the pictures he did of the 1876 Centennial Exhibition. The paintings are appreciated for their detail, for the notes he often left on them, and for "recording an environment that was very rapidly changing during the decades he was observing it."

Many of his paintings are held by Philadelphia-area historical societies. The largest collection, held by the Historical Society of Pennsylvania, consists of 40 boxes, two folders of indices and inventories, eight volumes and one oversized folio. Overall, it covers 66 linear feet.
