= Universal Alcorn Charter Elementary School =

- James Alcorn School
- U.S. National Register of Historic Places
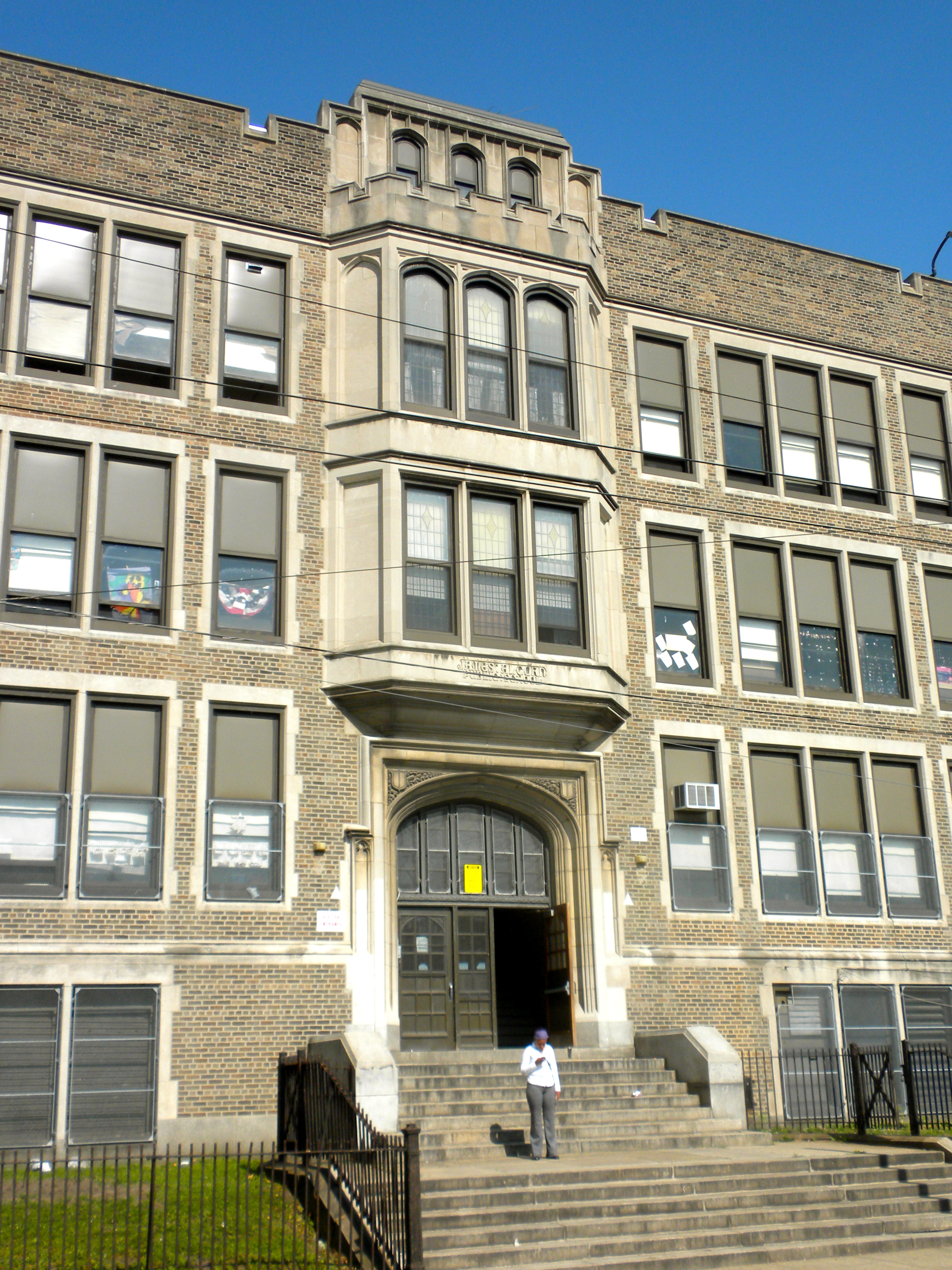
- James Alcorn School, May 2010

- Location within Philadelphia Location within Pennsylvania Location within the United States
- Location: 3200 Dickinson St., Philadelphia, Pennsylvania
- Coordinates: 39°56′06″N 75°11′51″W
- Area: 3.5 acres (1.4 ha)
- Built: 1931–1932
- Architect: Irwin T. Catharine
- Architectural style: Late Gothic Revival
- MPS: Philadelphia Public Schools TR
- NRHP reference No.: 88002225
- Added to NRHP: November 18, 1988

The Universal Alcorn Charter Elementary School is an American charter school that is located in the Grays Ferry neighborhood of Philadelphia, Pennsylvania.

The building was added to the National Register of Historic Places in 1988.

Beginning in 2012 the elementary levels remained at the original building while middle school classes began to be taught in the former King of Peace Catholic School.

== History and architectural features ==
Originally known as the James Alcorn School, this building was designed by Irwin T. Catharine and built between 1931 and 1932. It is a three-story, nine-bay, yellow brick building that sits on a raised basement. Created in the Late Gothic Revival style, it features two projecting entrances with stone surrounds, a central entrance with arched opening, a two-story projecting bay window, and a crenellated parapet.
