= Mill Creek (Philadelphia) =

Creek in Philadelphia, Pennsylvania

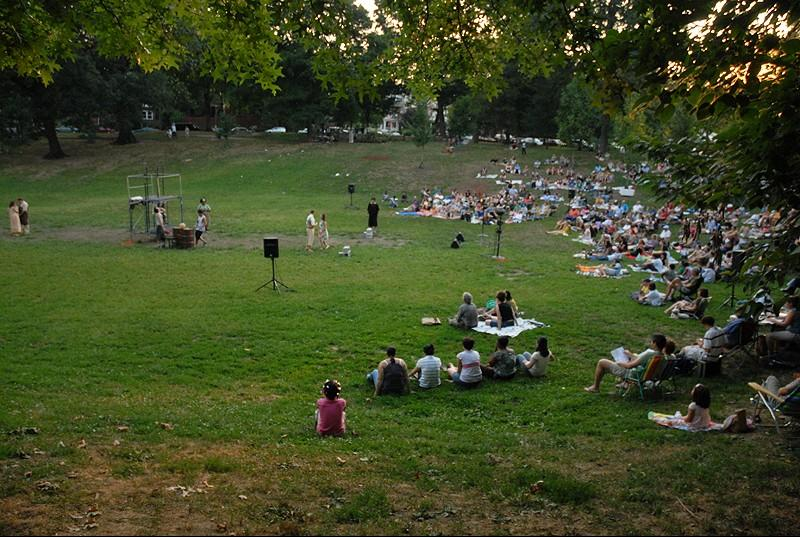
- The bowl in Clark Park was once a mill pond fed by Mill Creek

Location
- Country: United States
- State: Pennsylvania

Physical characteristics
- Source: Narbeth
  - location: Montgomery County, Pennsylvania
- Mouth
  - location: Schuylkill River
  - coordinates: 39.943047°N 75.2056826°W
- Basin size: about 5,000 acres (20 km^{2})
- Discharge
  - location: Schuylkill River

Mill Creek rises in Montgomery County, Pennsylvania; runs southeasterly to West Philadelphia, where it enters 19th-century sewer pipes; and debouches roughly five miles later in the Schuylkill River near The Woodlands Cemetery. It starts near Narberth, where its source is buried, then runs free for a mile or so before entering Philadelphia at the Overbrook station.

The creek, which drains about 5,000 acres (20 km^{2}), gave its name to two neighborhoods in Philadelphia under which it flows.

== Development ==
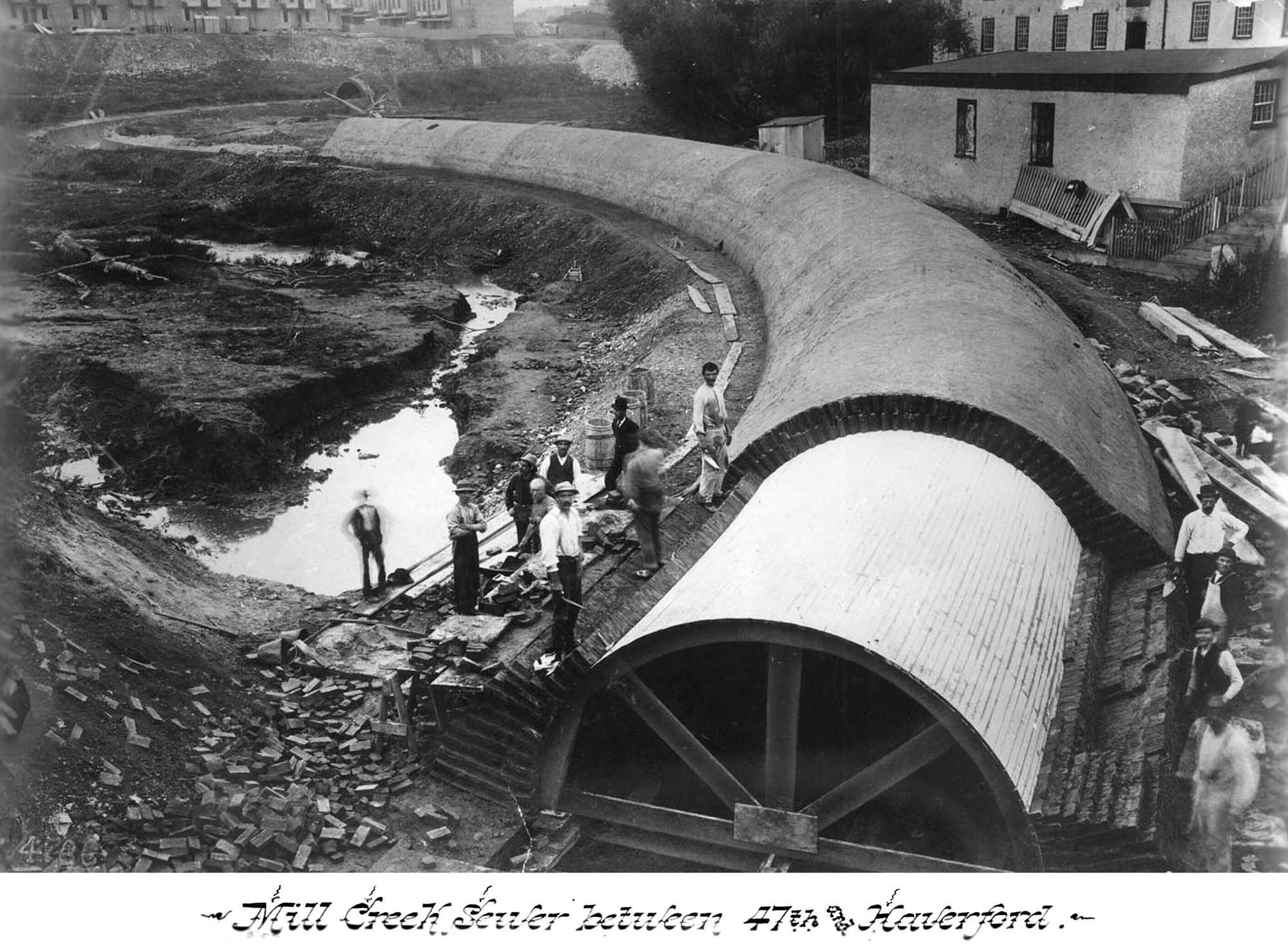
Mill Creek Sewer, ca. 1883, at 47th Street and Haverford Avenue in West Philadelphia, which encapsulated and buried Mill Creek in a 21-foot (6.4 m) sewer pipe, which ran from 1869 to 1894

The creek, called Nanganesey by the Lenape Native Americans in their patent to white settlers, was renamed Quarn Creek by the Swedish settlers. It later took the names Monson's Great Mill Fall, Mill Creek, and Little Mill Creek after the factories it powered at Grays Ferry.

Originally, Mill Creek was fast-flowing (10 miles per hour) and could discharge 300,000 cubic feet per minute into the Schuylkill. It was known to flood, destroying crops and creating seas of mud.

In 1834, merchant and banker John Buckman built a 90-foot dam across Mill Creek just south of Market Street at current-day 46th Street. The dam diverted some of the water into a 12-foot-wide mill race that ran parallel to the creek for about 1,100 feet and into a 30-by-60-foot "forebay." The water flowed under Market Street and over waterwheels that powered Buckman's mill.

As urban development began in West Philadelphia, the city covered several stream beds with cisterns and a layer of fill deep enough to level the land so that it could be platted into a regular street grid.

In 1866, a land survey determined that Mill Creek should be drained. The covering of Mill Creek began in 1869, encapsulating the watercourse in a 20-foot-diameter (6.1 m) drainpipe said to be the largest sewer pipe in the world at the time. By 1872, the creek was buried south to Baltimore Avenue. Its burial was completed around 1895, allowing the grid of rowhouse development to continue toward the city's western edge at Cobbs Creek.

Natural erosion, abetted by spotty maintenance of the cistern, has caused occasional collapses of the buildings above. In the 1930s, several homes collapsed on Walnut Street between 43rd and 44th Streets after the creek undermined them. There have been road collapses on 43rd Street, south of Walnut. In 1955, the block of Sansom Street between 43rd and 44th Streets collapsed and was condemned. The creek undermines the roadbed where the Route 34 and Route 13 trolleys cross 43rd Street.

A prominent feature of Clark Park is its "bowl," once a mill pond fed by the creek.

Montgomery County has begun an effort to restore the creek's watershed through its Mill Creek Stream Restoration.

== See also ==
- List of rivers of Pennsylvania
