= Gray's Ferry Tavern =

Coordinates: 39.942°N 75.207°W

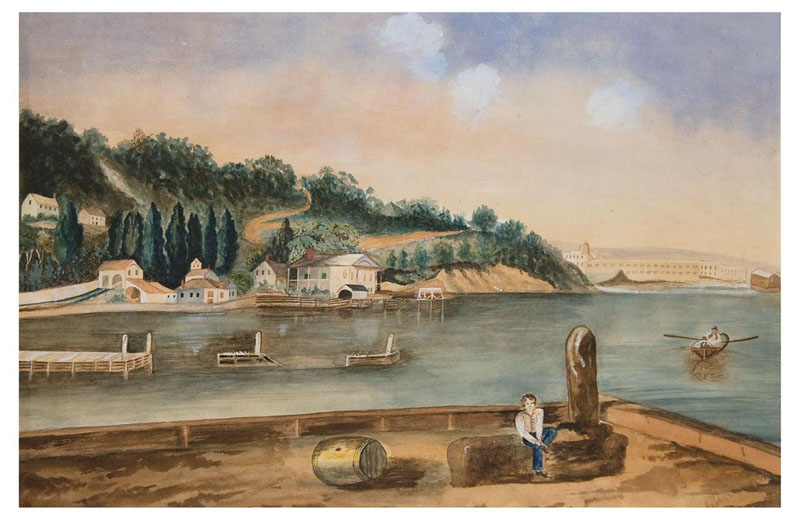
"Schuylkill River at Gray’s Ferry", by P. Clark, ca. 1835. Shows the inn and garden on the west bank of the river.

Gray's Ferry Tavern (also known as Lower Ferry House, Gray's Tavern, Gray's Inn, Gray's Ferry Inn, Gray's Garden, Sans Souci, and Kochersperger's Hotel) was a restaurant and inn that operated in the 18th and 19th centuries in present-day Philadelphia, Pennsylvania. Set on the west bank of the Schuylkill River at the primary crossing for travel to and from points south of Philadelphia, the tavern hosted George Washington and many other famous people of its day.

== History ==
=== Gray family (1740–1795) ===
The inn was established in the mid-1700s by a George Gray, who had purchased 199 acres of land on both sides of the river in what was then Blockley Township (present-day West Philadelphia) and Moyamensing (present-day South Philadelphia). The land lay near the "Lower Ferry", one of three across the Schuylkill and the primary link between Philadelphia and points south. Gray took over operation of the ferry, which came to be known as Gray's Ferry.

In 1740, Gray retired, leaving the business to his sons, George Gray and Robert Gray. The sons expanded the operations; the inn became known as "Lower Ferry House" or "Gray's Tavern."

In June 1775, George Washington was the guest of honor at a dinner at the tavern shortly after he was appointed commander-in-chief of the Continental Army by the Second Continental Congress. He was joined by John Adams, Benjamin Franklin, Thomas Jefferson, John Langdon, and Benjamin Rush.

During the American Revolutionary War, British soldiers took over the inn and surrounding property and erected a series of pontoon bridges. The buildings were all but destroyed when they were forced out, but the pontoon bridge survived and was kept in use. Gray rebuilt the house and gardens and returned to business.

In the early 1780s, several acres of the landscape around the tavern were reshaped by Samuel Vaughan, a London merchant who owned plantations in Jamaica and who possessed a zeal for designing gardens. Vaughan planted trees and other plants and added winding walkways through groves and arbors and water features. "The place was a veritable fairy scene, with bowers, grottoes, waterfalls, bridges, islands, and a most attractive Inn, with tables set upon the greensward," according to a 1922 history journal. In effect, Vaughan created "American's first public pleasure park." The gardens turned the tavern from merely a travelers' waypoint into a resort spot, easily reached from the city for meals and day trips.

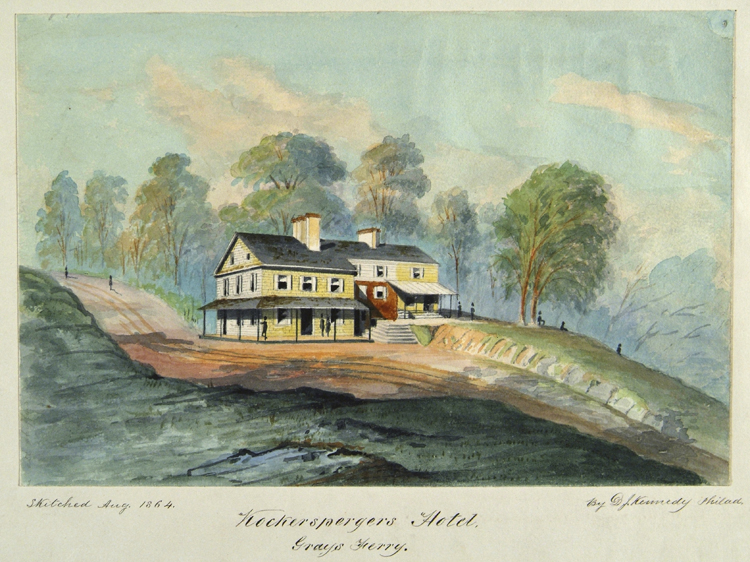
The inn at Gray's Ferry, as painted by David J. Kennedy in August 1864. The piazza was added around 1795.

In 1787, delegates to the Constitutional Convention eager to escape hot and humid Philadelphia came to the tavern. In his diaries, Washington noted visits on May 18, June 26, July 17, and September 2. At dawn on July 14, James Madison, Manasseh Cutler, and Alexander Hamilton and several others rode out from Philadelphia, ate breakfast on the tavern's "high porch overlooking the river", and returned for the day's deliberations.

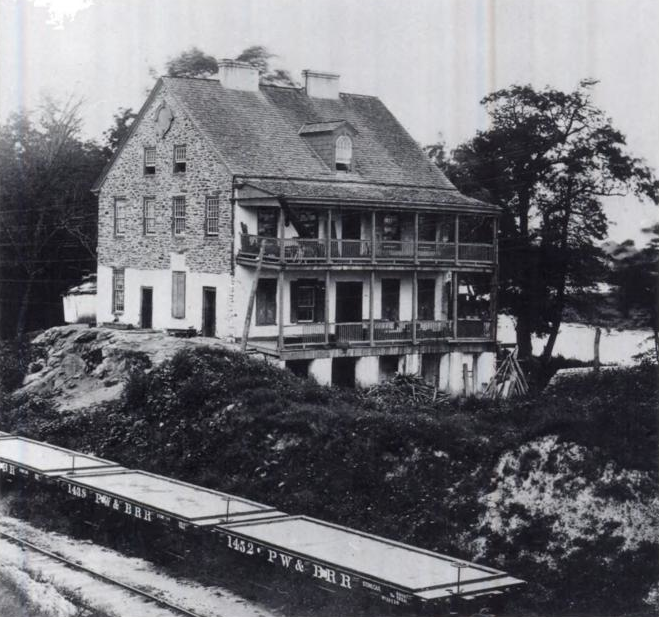
The innkeeper's house at Gray's Ferry Inn, ca. 1870s. In the foreground are flatcars belonging to the Philadelphia, Wilmington and Baltimore Railroad.

In 1793, Dolley Todd — the future Dolley Madison — and her children took refuge at the inn during an epidemic of yellow fever. The disease killed her husband, who declined to leave Philadelphia; the following year, she married James Madison.

=== Subsequent owners (1795–1800s) ===
From 1795 to 1803, the inn was run by George Weed. Weed was the assistant quartermaster of the Second Troop of Philadelphia City Cavalry, a volunteer military unit established in 1794 on the model of the First Troop Philadelphia City Cavalry, and the inn (known to some as Weed's Tavern) became a frequent meeting place for the unit's leaders.

"The decline of Gray's resort began with the opening, in 1803, of the permanent bridge at Market Street, and after the completion of the famous plowed railway sidings, fell from its high estate," wrote local artist Frank Taylor around 1913.

After Weed, the inn passed quickly through several hands: in 1803, to Isaac Tucker; in 1804, to James Coyles, who had run an establishment called the "Indian Queen" on Philadelphia's Fourth Street.

In 1805, the inn passed to Curtis Grubb, a fourth-generation member of the Grubb Family Iron Dynasty. Curtis was the son of Peter Grubb III Jr. and grandson of Colonel Curtis Grubb, both Revolutionary War officers and iron magnates. Peter had been friends with George Gray since at least the time of the Revolutionary War.

At some point, the younger Curtis married Maria Eva Kochersperger, the second daughter of Johann Martin Kochersperger, a native of Rittershoffen, Alsace (at the time part of France), who had immigrated around 1770 to Strasburg Township, Lancaster County, near Philadelphia. Johann served as an enlisted soldier in the Revolutionary War; afterward, he moved first to Northern Liberties and then "acquired a vast tract of land near Gray's Ferry on Darby Road."

In 1825, the inn was taken over by Maria's older brother, Martin Henry I Kochersperger. Martin renamed the establishment Sans Souci; it was also known as Kochersperger’s Hotel. Martin was the uncle of Elizabeth Deshong Kochersperger, who in 1838 gave birth to John Wanamaker, the future department-store tycoon. He was also the grandfather of Lieutenant Colonel Charles Kochersperger, who commanded the Union Army's 71st Pennsylvania Infantry regiment at the 1864 Battle of the Wilderness.

In 1848, the inn was kept by a Mr. Olwine.

By 1856, a guidebook noted that "Gray's Garden has become a memory."
