= David Kennedy (cricketer) =

Scottish cricketer

Personal information
- Born: 10 July 1890; Uddingston, Lanarkshire, Scotland
- Died: 1 July 1916 (aged 25); Leipzig Salient, Authuille, France
- Batting: Right-handed
- Role: Wicketkeeper

Domestic team information
- Years: Team
- 1914: Scotland

Career statistics
Competition	First-class
Matches	1
Runs scored	11
Batting average	5.50
100s/50s	–/–
Top score	10
Catches/stumpings	–/–
- Source: Cricinfo, 26 July 2020

David Kennedy (10 July 1890 – 1 July 1916) was a Scottish first-class cricketer and soldier. He was a right-handed batsman and wicketkeeper. He was killed in the Battle of the Somme.

== Life and career ==
Kennedy was born in July 1890 in Uddingston. Educated at Uddingston Grammar School and Jordanhill Teacher Training College, he became a schoolteacher at Townhead School after graduating from the latter.

Kennedy made his debut in first-class cricket representing Scotland against Ireland at Observatory Lane on 16 July 1914. He scored 11 runs during the match. At the outbreak of the First World War in August 1914, Kennedy enlisted in the Glasgow Commercials of the Highland Light Infantry and soon rose to the rank of sergeant. Shortly afterwards he was sent to the frontline in France, he was killed on 1 July 1916 at the Leipzig Salient on the first day on the Somme. He was buried at Lonsdale Cemetery, Authuille.
