= University Avenue Bridge =

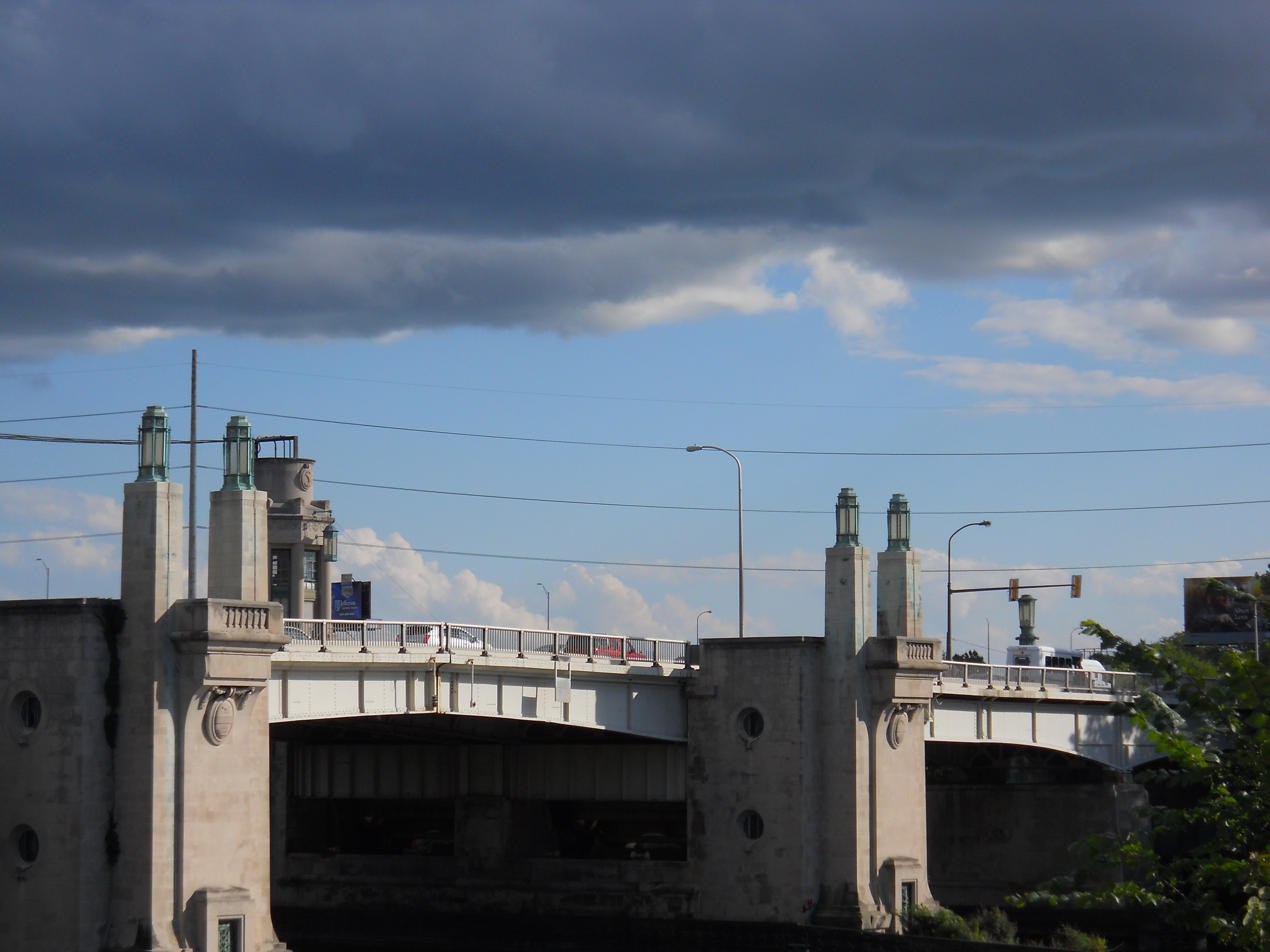
- Coordinates: 39°56′30″N 75°11′52″W
- Carries: University Avenue
- Crosses: Schuylkill River
- Locale: Philadelphia, Pennsylvania
- Official name: University Avenue Bridge
- Owner: Pennsylvania Department of Transportation, 1961, formerly City of Philadelphia
- Maintained by: PennDOT

Characteristics
- Design: Beaux-Arts Double leaf bascule bridge
- Material: Steel, limestone, concrete, bronze
- Total length: 536 feet (163 m)
- Width: 100 feet (30 m)
- No. of spans: 4
- Piers in water: 4
- Clearance below: 30 feet (9.1 m)

History
- Designer: Paul Philippe Cret, architect, and Stephen H. Noyes, engineer
- Constructed by: Dravo Contracting Company
- Construction start: 1925; 101 years ago
- Construction end: 1930; 96 years ago
- Opened: 1930; 96 years ago
- University Avenue Bridge
- U.S. National Register of Historic Places
- Location within Pennsylvania
- Location: Philadelphia, Pennsylvania
- Coordinates: 39°56′30″N 75°11′52″W
- Built: 1927–1933
- Architect: Paul Philippe Cret
- Architectural style: Beaux Arts
- NRHP reference No.: 94000515
- Added to NRHP: May 26, 1994

Location
- Interactive map of University Avenue Bridge

The University Avenue Bridge is a double-leaf bascule bridge crossing the Schuylkill River in Philadelphia, Pennsylvania. The four-lane bridge links University Avenue in West Philadelphia with South 34th Street in the Grays Ferry section of South Philadelphia. It measures 536 feet (163 m) long, 100 feet (30 m) wide, and clears the water by 30 feet (9.1 m).

Built in 1930, the bridge was placed on the National Register of Historic Places on May 26, 1994.

== Gallery ==
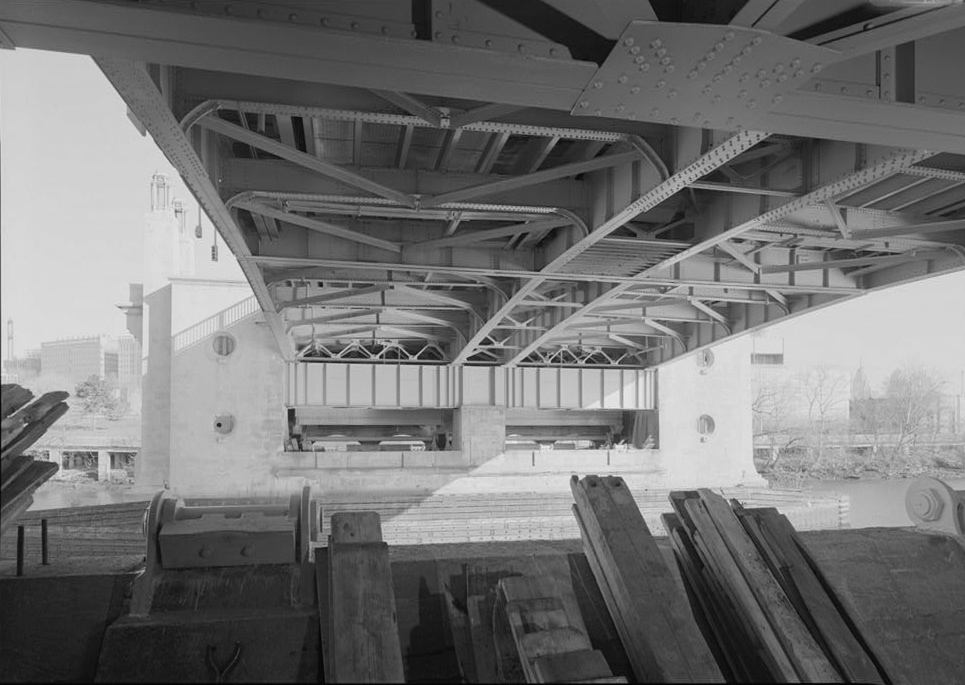
Beneath the bridge

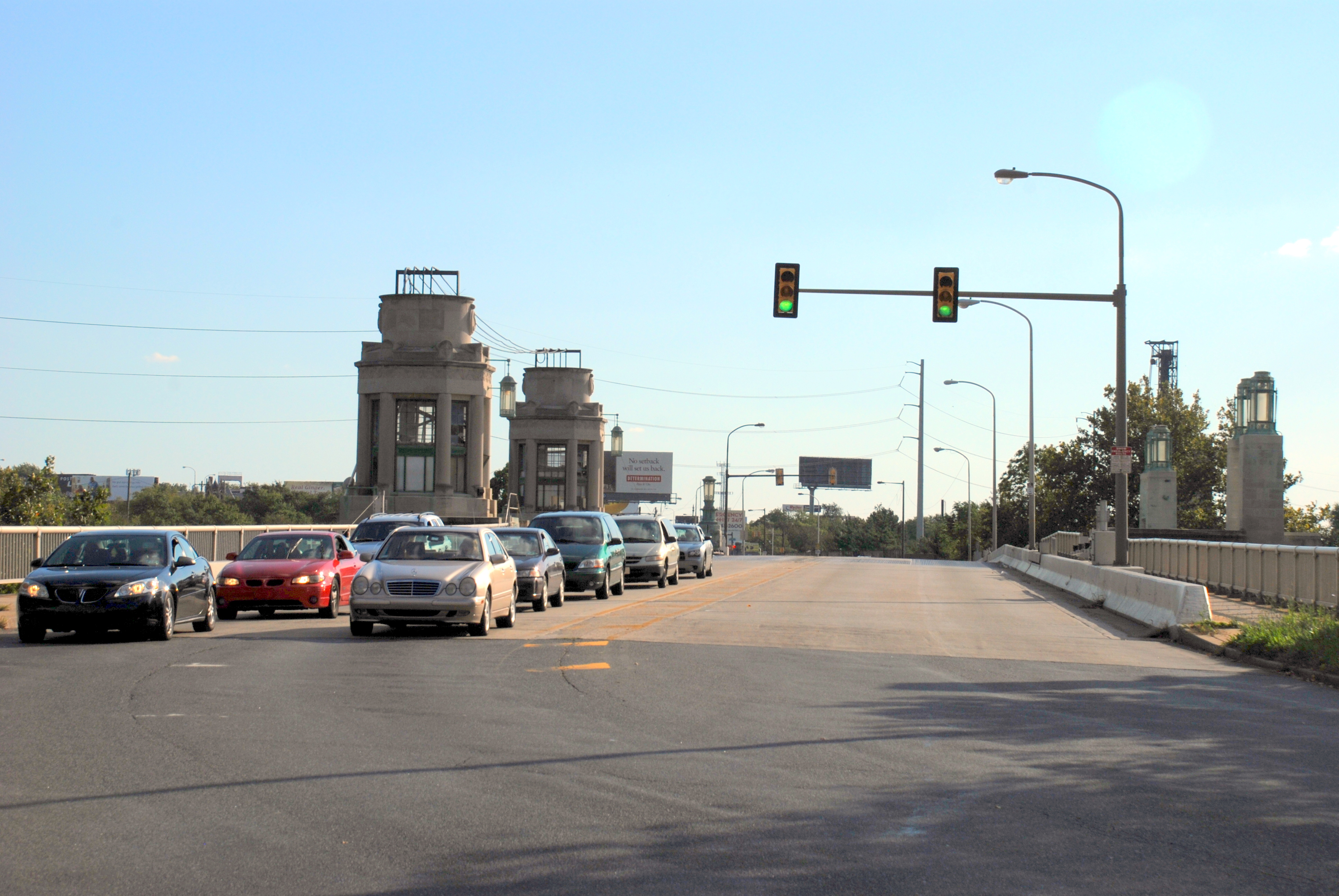
Bridge surface

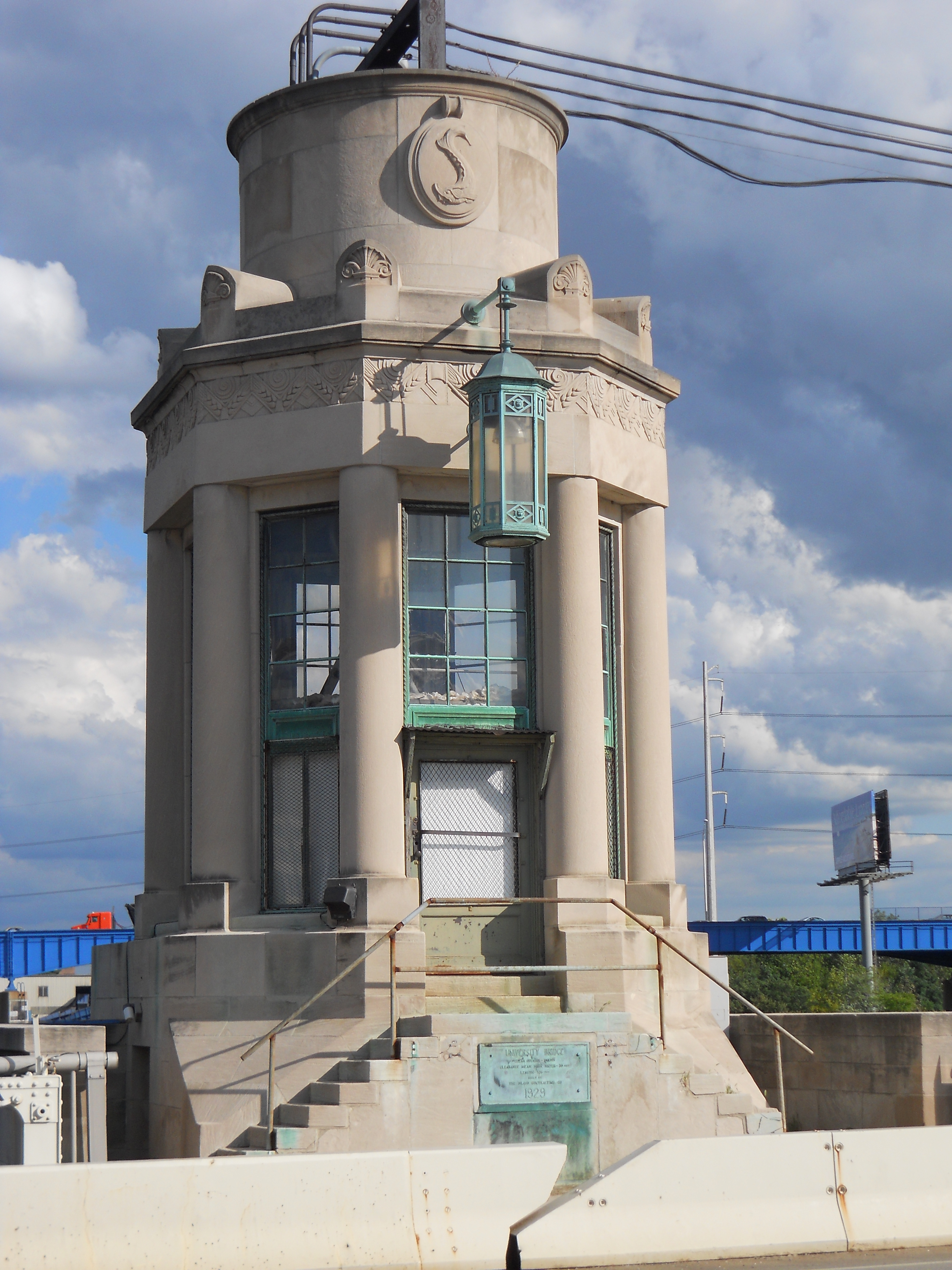

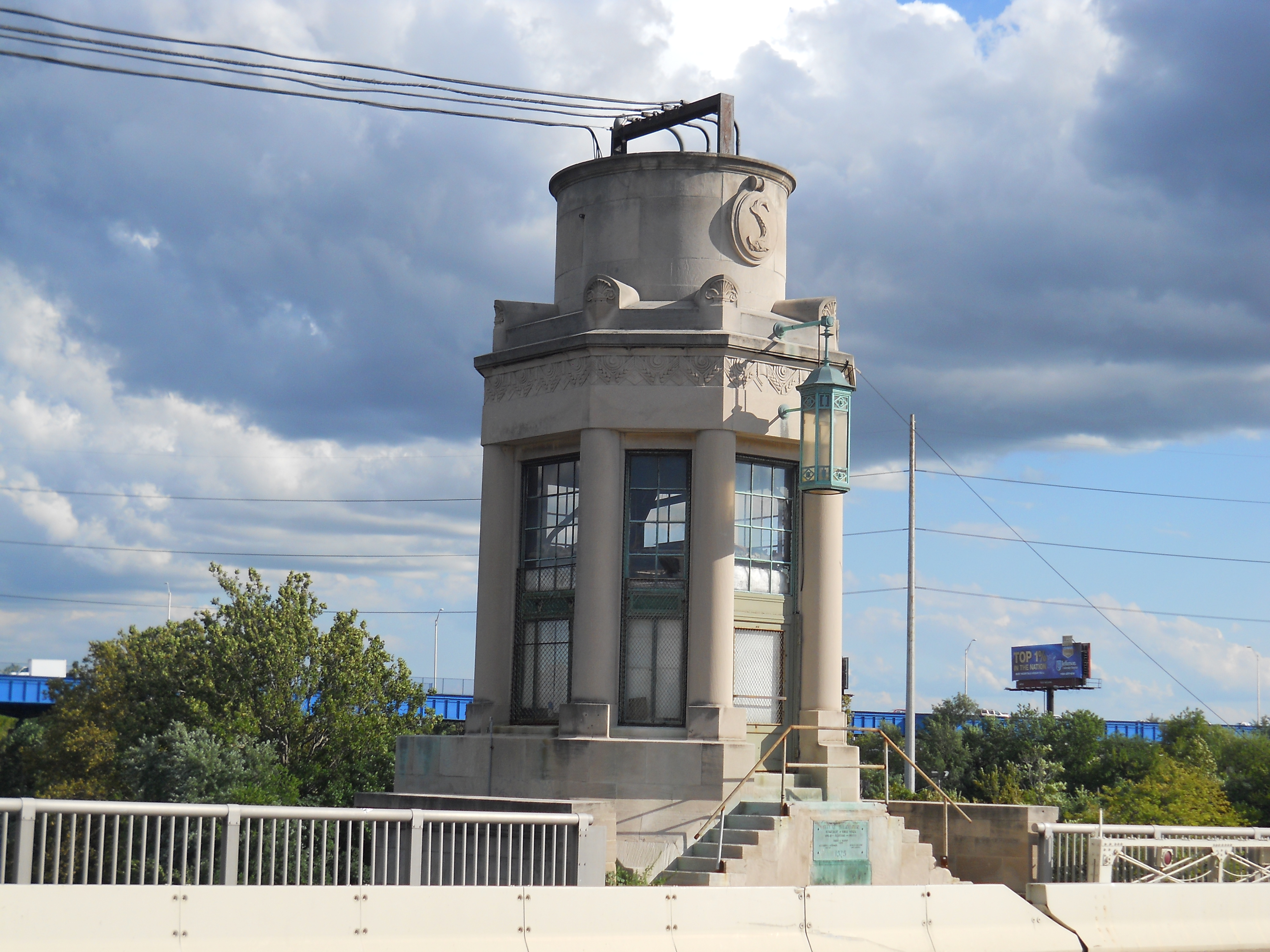

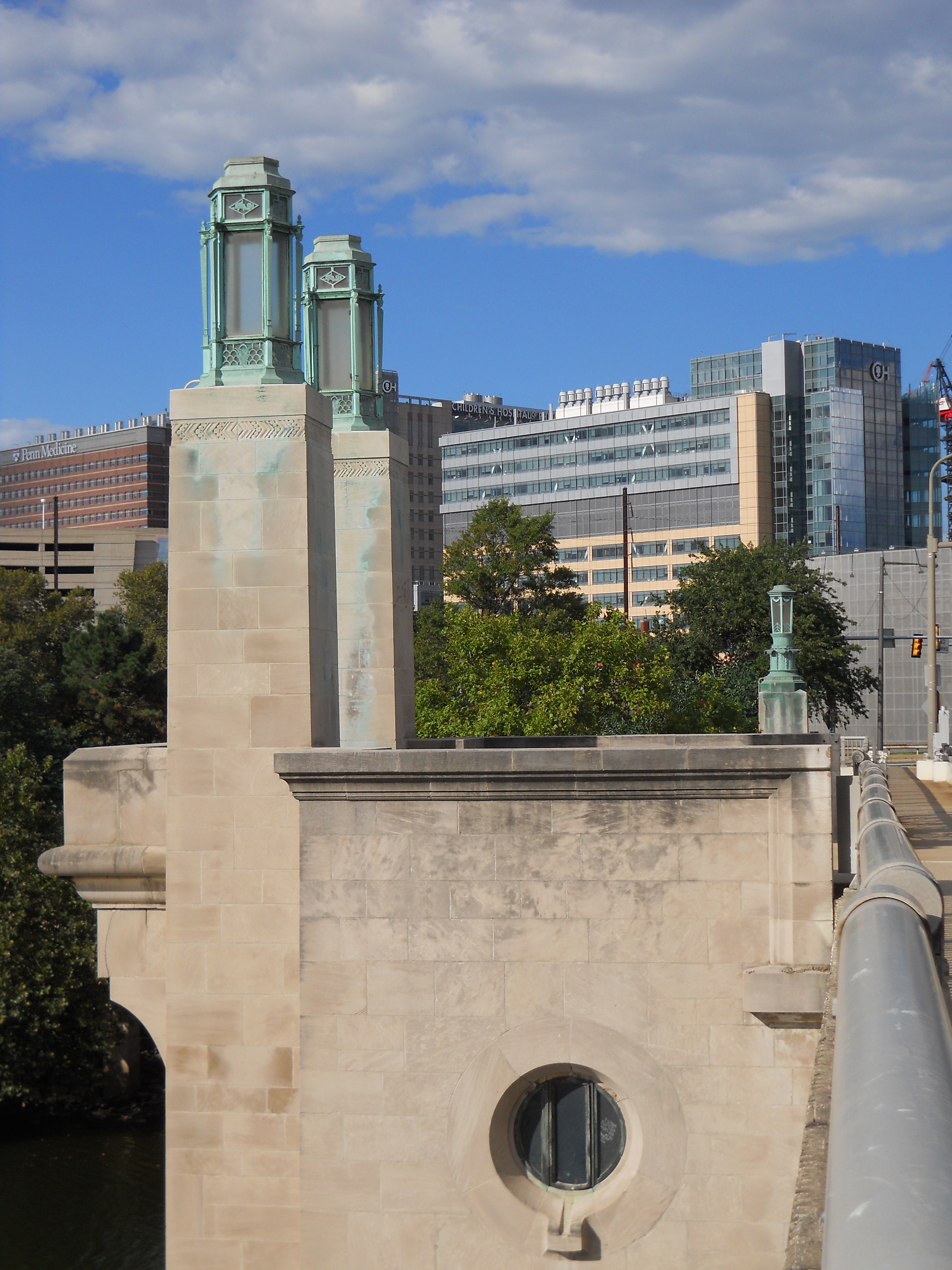

== See also ==
- List of bridges documented by the Historic American Engineering Record in Pennsylvania
- List of crossings of the Schuylkill River
