= Thornbury Township, Pennsylvania =

Thornbury Township is the name of some places in the U.S. state of Pennsylvania:

- Thornbury Township, Chester County, Pennsylvania
- Thornbury Township, Delaware County, Pennsylvania
