= Leslie Pinckney Hill =

American educator, writer and community leader (1880–1960)

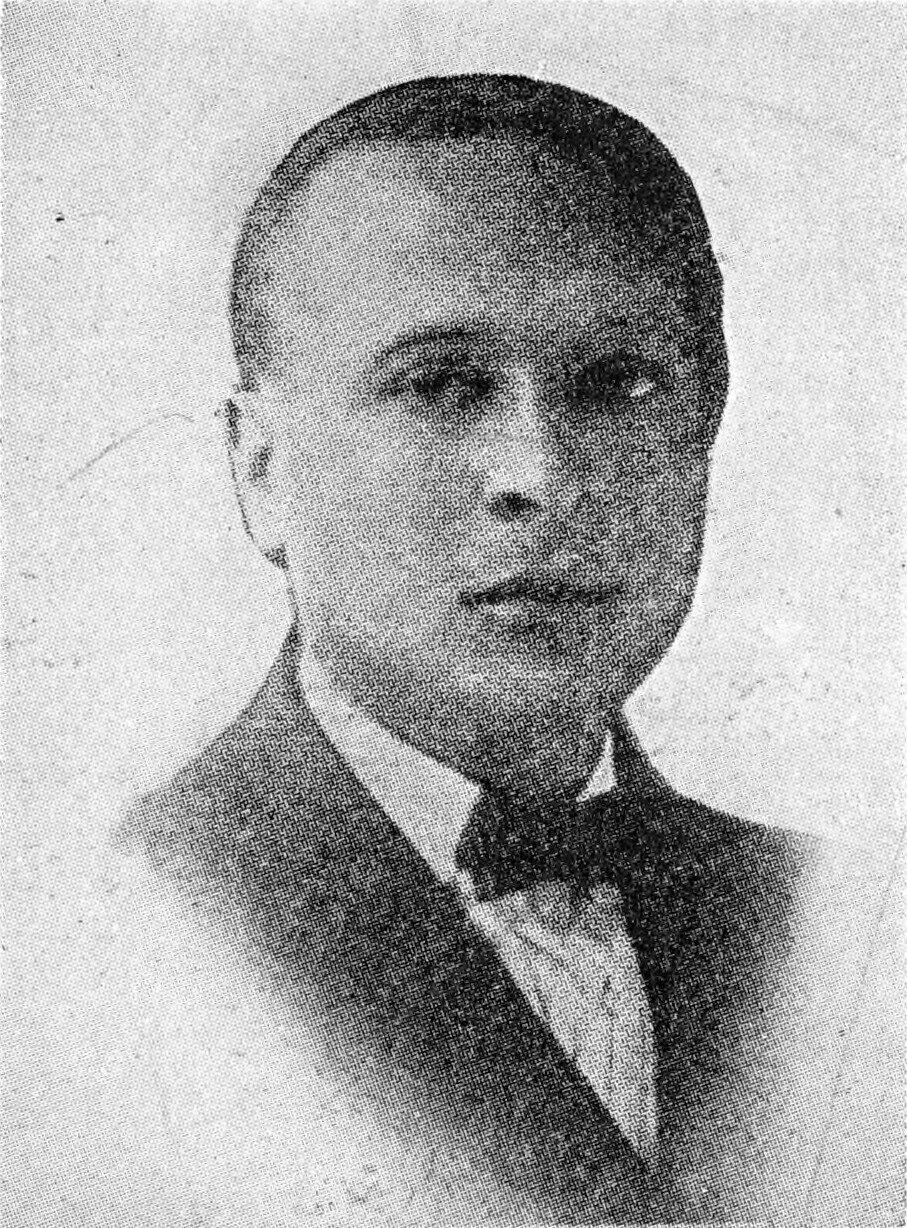
- Born: May 14, 1880; Lynchburg, Virginia, US
- Died: February 15, 1960 (aged 79); Philadelphia, Pennsylvania, US
- Education: Harvard University (BA, MA)
- Occupations: Educator, writer and community leader
- Known for: First president of Cheyney University of Pennsylvania

Leslie Pinckney Hill (14 May 1880 – 15 February 1960) was an American educator, writer, and community leader. From 1913 to 1951, he served as principal of the Institute for Colored Youth in Philadelphia and oversaw the institution's move to Cheyney, Pennsylvania, and its establishment as Cheyney State Teachers College. He also served as the college's first president.

== Life and career ==
The son of a former slave, Hill was born in Lynchburg, Virginia. He attended primary school locally, and played the trumpet. His family moved to East Orange, New Jersey, where he attended high school. Excelling at his studies, he skipped his junior year, and was accepted to Harvard University his senior year. He entered Harvard in 1899, supplementing his scholarship by working as a waiter. There he attended the classes of William James and was active in debating. He was elected to Phi Beta Kappa and graduated with honors in 1903. He stayed at Harvard another year for a master's degree in education.

Hill taught at Tuskegee Institute from 1904 to 1907, and was principal of the Manassas Industrial Institute from 1907 to 1913. In 1913 he became principal at the Cheyney, Philadelphia Institute for Colored Youth, overseeing changes in name and status and staying there until 1951 and its establishment as Cheyney State Teachers College. Hill also wrote poems and essays and published a play about Toussaint L'Ouverture in 1928. In 1944, he founded Camp Hope, a camp for underprivileged children in Delaware County. Hill was a part of the Harlem Renaissance. Other notable accomplishments include his founding of the now Charles A Melton Arts & Education Center in 1918. He died from a stroke in Philadelphia in 1960.

== Works ==
- Leslie Pinckney Hill (July 1915). "Negro Ideals: Their Effect and Their Embarrassments". The Journal of Race Development. 6 (1): 91–103. doi:10.2307/29738105. ISSN 1068-3380. JSTOR 29738105. OCLC 7831142104.
- 'Introduction', in Alice Moore Dunbar-Nelson, ed., The Dunbar speaker and entertainer, containing the best prose and poetic selections by and about the Negro race, with programs arranged for special entertainments, 1920
- The wings of oppression, 1921
- Toussaint L'Ouverture: a dramatic history, 1928
- Jethro; A Biblical Drama, 1931
