= Thornton, Pennsylvania =

Coordinates: 39°54′26″N 75°31′54″W

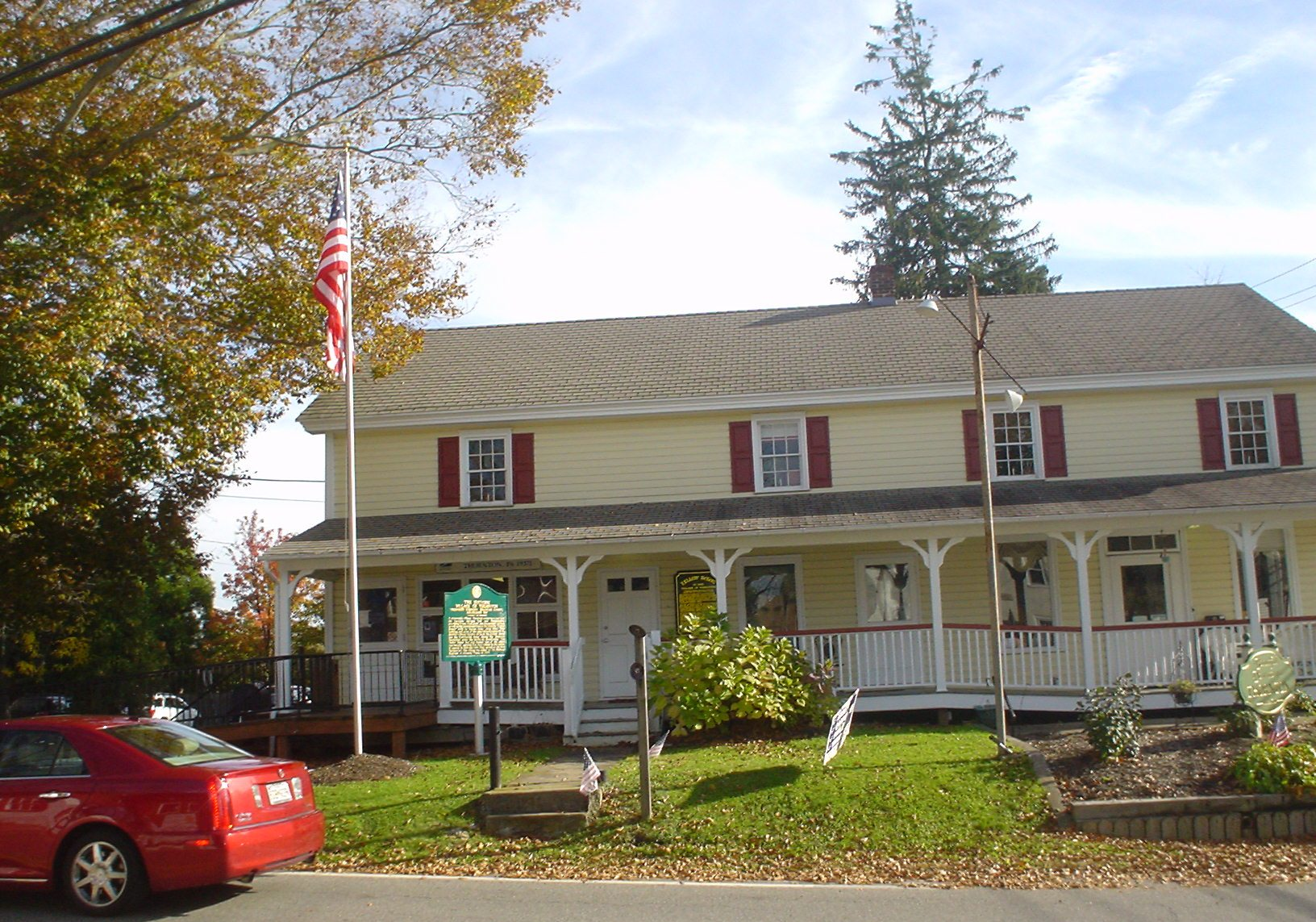
- Thornton Village Historic District in Thornton, Pennsylvania

- Location within Pennsylvania
- Country: United States
- State: Pennsylvania
- County: Delaware
- Township: Concord
- Time zone: UTC-5 (EST)
  - Summer (DST): UTC-4 (EDT)
- ZIP Code: 19373
- Area codes: 610 and 484

Thornton is an unincorporated community spanning Thornbury Township, Concord Township and Middletown Township in Delaware County, Pennsylvania, United States.

The George W. Hill Correctional Facility, located in the townships of Thornbury and Concord, has a Thornton postal address.

== History ==
In 1750, Thornton was known as Yellow House after the Inn and tavern opened in 1750.

The community includes the Thornton Village Historic District, which includes buildings dating from 1750 to 1855. The District was added to the National Register of Historic Places in 2006.
