= George W. Cheyney =

American businessman and politician (1854–1903)

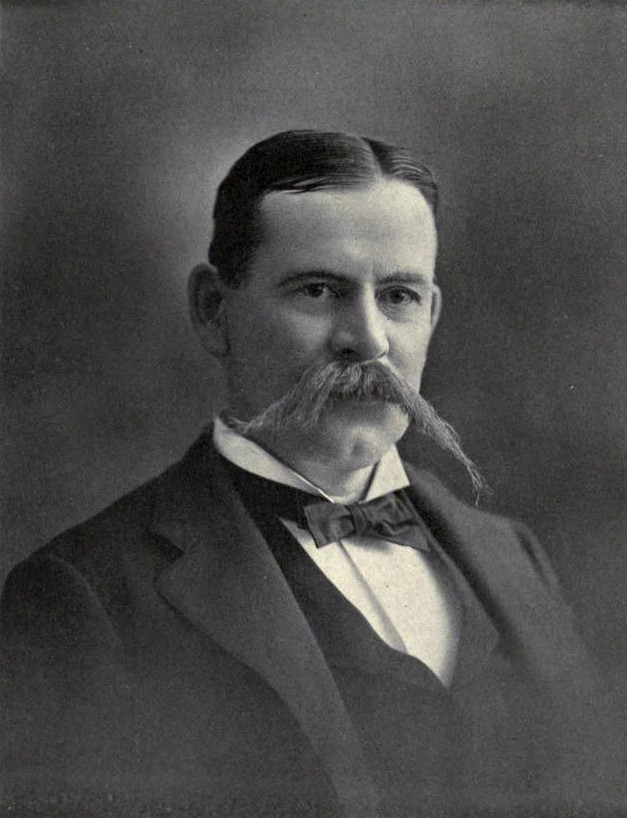
George W. Cheyney

George Washington Cheyney (September 1, 1854 – August 14, 1903) was an American businessman and politician. While living in Tombstone, Arizona Territory he served four years as the territory's Superintendent of Public Instruction and was twice elected to the territorial legislature. In his later years he was postmaster for Tucson, Arizona before being elected a probate judge.

== Life and career ==
Cheyney was born to Waldron J. and Frances (Potts) Cheyney on September 1, 1854 in Philadelphia, Pennsylvania. One of eight children, his father was a businessman who had served as a captain during the American Civil War and his mother was from an old Quaker family. His family is descended from Squire Thomas Cheyney who informed General George Washington during the Battle of Brandywine that the British were flanking him to the north. Squire Cheyney was later appointed to the Pennsylvania Ratifying Convention to ratify the United States Constitution. George W. Cheyney is the brother of Edward Potts Cheyney and John K. Cheyney. While growing up, Cheyney was educated in local public schools. He moved to New York City in 1871 where he worked for an optician. Cheyney returned to Philadelphia in 1877.

In 1879, Cheyney went to Atchison, Kansas before continuing on to Leadville, Colorado. He moved to Tombstone, Arizona Territory in 1881. There he became superintendent for the Tombstone Mill & Mining Company. Cheyney married Annie Neal of Atchison, Kansas on September 20, 1882. The union produced six daughters: Bernice, Frances, Mary, Ruth, Edith, and Eleanor.

Socially, Cheyney became a Mason in Tombstone. He was also a member of the Ancient Order of United Workmen and Knights Templar. Politically, Cheyney was active in Republican politics. He was a member of the Cochise county and territorial central committees. Cheyney was elected to represent Cochise county in the Council (upper house) during the 15th Arizona Territorial Legislature. During the session, he fulfilled two campaign promises by voting to block any new subdividing of counties and for moving the territorial capital from Prescott to Phoenix.

Cheyney was sworn in as Superintendent of Public Instruction on April 11, 1889, having been appointed to the office three days earlier. He was appointed to a second two-year term in 1891. In 1890, Cheyney was the Republican challenger to Arizona's territorial delegate to Congress, Mark Smith. While his vote to move the territorial capital to Phoenix was considered hostile by the residents of Prescott, Cheyney's supporters used his vote as an example of his loyalty to the people he represented. They also argued that a Republican delegate would have more influence with the Harrison administration. Despite these arguments, he lost the election to Smith. Cheyney was a delegate to Arizona's 1891 constitutional convention. His second term in the territorial legislature came during the 1893 session. Cheyney resigned as superintendent to serve in the legislature.

In June 1898, Cheyney was appointed postmaster for Tucson. He arrived in Tucson to assume his new duties at the end of the month. In 1902, Cheyney was elected probate judge for Pima County and took office on January 1, 1903. In his final weeks, he traveled to San Francisco, California to seek medical treatment from George E. Goodfellow. Cheyney died as a result of edema on August 14, 1903. He was buried in Philadelphia, Pennsylvania.
