= George Gray (Pennsylvania politician) =

American politician

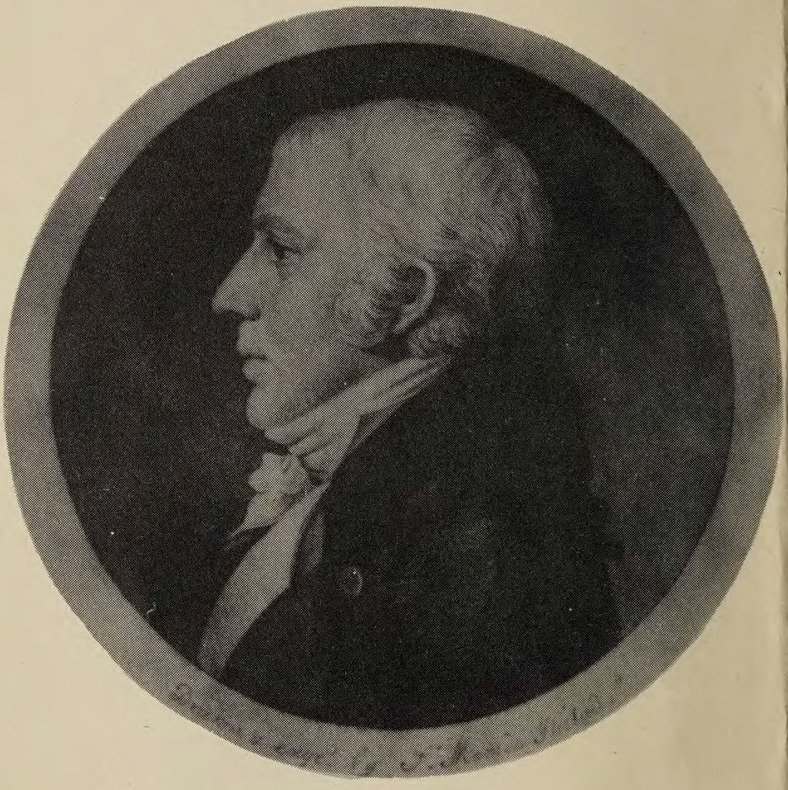
- Born: 26 October 1725; Germantown
- Died: 23 January 1800
- Occupation: Politician
- Spouse: Martha Ibbetson Gray

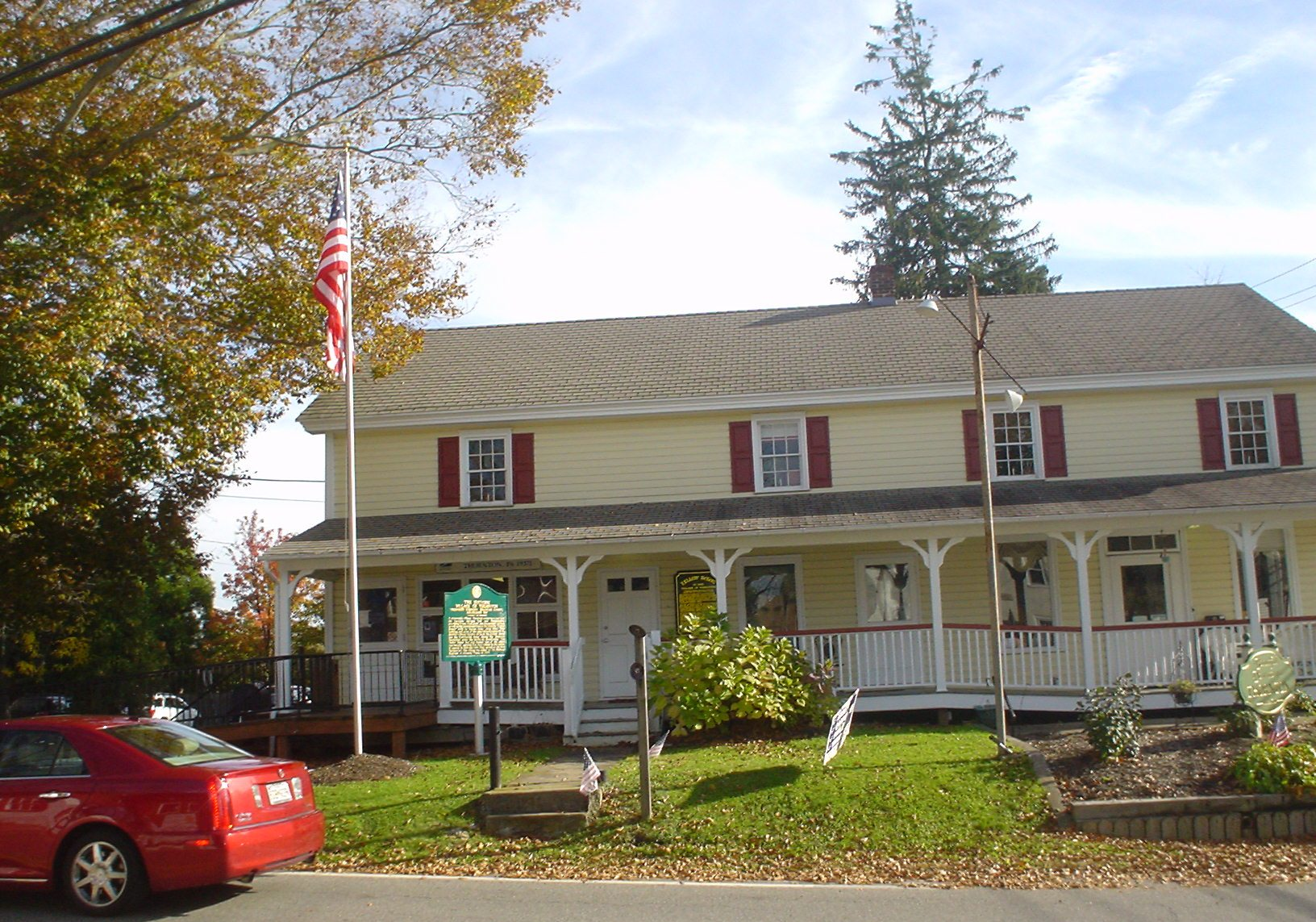
Yellow House, George Gray's summer residence in Thornton, Pennsylvania

George Gray (1725–1800) served as a member of the Pennsylvania Provincial Assembly and as its Speaker in 1783.

His father, also named George Gray, had purchased 199 acres of land on both sides of the Schuylkill River in what was then Blockley Township (present-day West Philadelphia) and Moyamensing (present-day South Philadelphia). The elder Gray founded Gray's Ferry Tavern and Inn on the western bank of the river and took over operation of Gray's Ferry. In 1740, the father retired, leaving the businesses to his sons, Robert and 15-year-old George.

In 1748, the younger George Gray became a lieutenant in Company Nine of the Associators, a volunteer militia.

In 1772, Gray was elected to the Colonial Assembly, and served through its transition to becoming the State Assembly in 1776. He was elected 34th Speaker of the Assembly on October 30, 1783. His term saw the establishment of Harrisburg, now the state capital.

While Speaker of the Assembly, Gray served, ex officio, as a trustee of the University of the State of Pennsylvania (now the University of Pennsylvania).

He was the author of "Treason Resolutions", ordering paper currency, for which he was turned out of the Quaker Meeting.

He was on the Committee of Safety when appointed chairman of the Board of War.

In 1784, Gray was elected a member of the American Philosophical Society.

Gray was a signatory to ratification of the United States Constitution by the Commonwealth of Pennsylvania in 1787.

Gray had a summer residence in Thornton, Pennsylvania, known as "Yellow House". It is part of the Thornton Village Historic District which was added to the National Register of Historic Places in 2006.

== Personal life ==
Gray married Martha Ibbetson (or Ibison) on November 25, 1752.
