= Edward Potts Cheyney =

American historian and economist

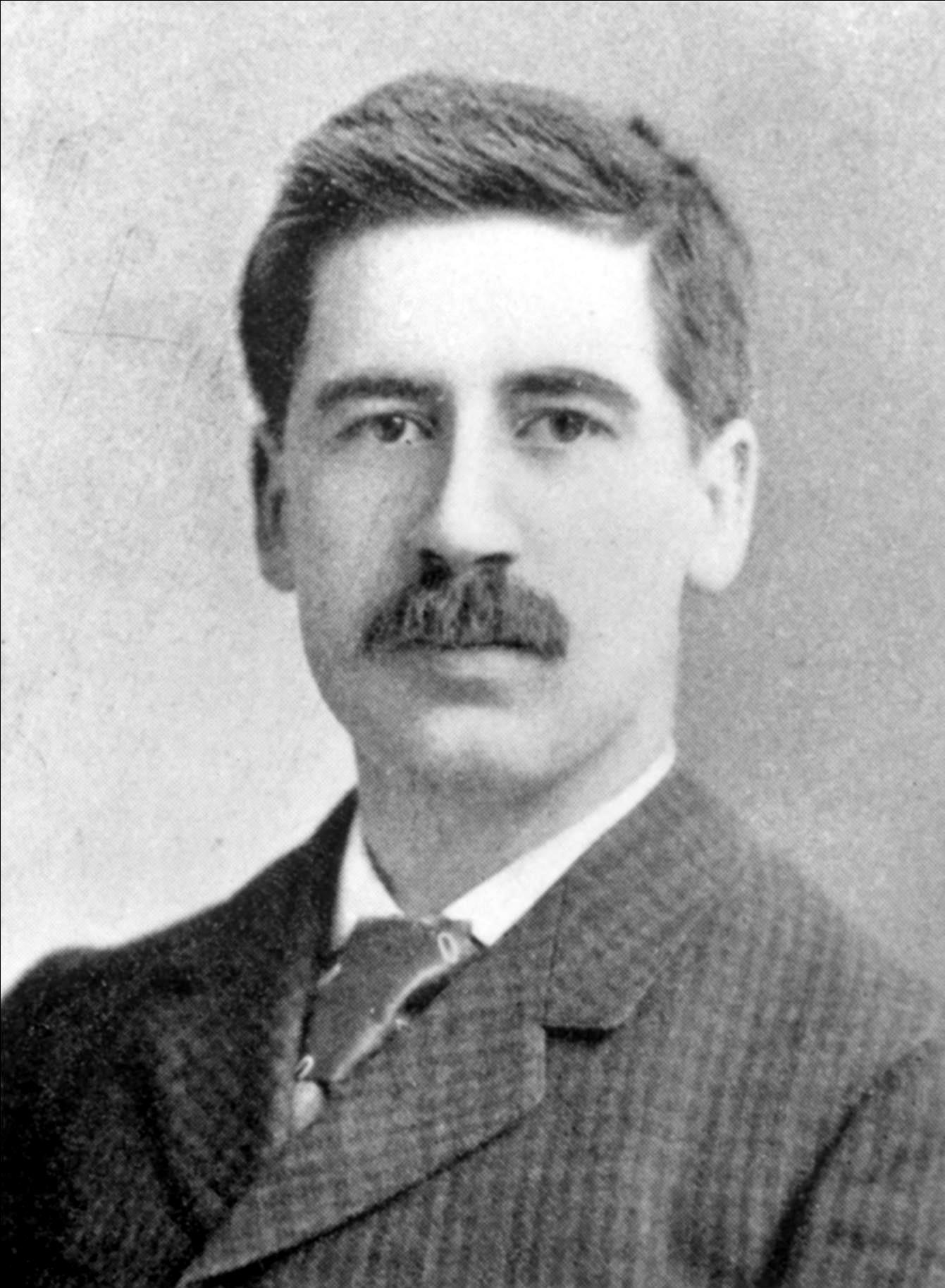
Cheyney as a young professor at the University of Pennsylvania

Edward Potts Cheyney, A.M., LL.D. (January 17, 1861 – February 1, 1947) was an American historical and economic writer, born at Wallingford, Pennsylvania. He graduated from the University of Pennsylvania in 1883. He visited German universities and studied at the British Museum. He was elected as a member of the American Philosophical Society in 1904. He was editor of the American Historical Review and 1923 president of the American Historical Society. The University of Pennsylvania conferred the degree of LL.D. on him in 1911. He taught at the University of Pennsylvania from 1890 until 1934.

His writings were employed as college textbooks. They include:

- Social Changes in England in the Sixteenth Century (1896)
- Social and Industrial History of England (1901)
- Short History of England (1904)
- European Background of American History (1904)
- Readings in English History (1908)
- A History of England, from the Defeat of the Armada to the Death of Elizabeth (two volumes; volume i, 1914)

== Personal life ==
E.P. Cheyney was the son of Waldron J. Cheyney, Jr. and Frances "Fannie" Potts. George W. Cheyney and John K. Cheyney are two of his siblings. Both families were Quakers. His family is descended from Squire Thomas Cheyney who informed General George Washington during the Battle of Brandywine that the British were flanking him to the north. Squire Cheyney was later appointed to the Pennsylvania Ratifying Convention to ratify the United States Constitution. Dr. E.P. Cheyney gave a talk to the Historical Society of Pennsylvania about the genealogy of Squire Thomas Cheyney in 1936.

On June 10, 1886 he married Gertrude Levis Squires. They had three children, Alice Squires, Ernest Waldron, and Edward Ralph Cheyney. She died in 1918. He died on February 1, 1947.
