= John K. Cheyney =

American businessman

John King Cheyney (April 1, 1858 – March 19, 1939) was a Sponge Company & Sponge Exchange founder, a local politician and a sponge industry promoter in Tarpon Springs, Florida. A memorial on Dodecanese Boulevard commemorates his life. He is listed as a Great Floridian.

== Biography ==
He was born in Philadelphia, Pennsylvania to Waldron Joseph Cheyney and Frances Potts on April 1, 1858. George W. Cheyney and Edward Potts Cheyney were two of his brothers. He married Mabel Starr in 1897. He died in Tarpon Springs, Florida on March 19, 1939.

== Legacy ==
The John K. Cheyney House (1890) at 30 West Tarpon was home for the Philadelphia banker who financed establishment of the sponge industry in Tarpon Springs, bringing Greeks from the Dodecanese Islands. His efforts as a land developer seeking establish Tarpon as a sponging center failed for nine years until the Spanish–American War caused boats from Key West to shelter in the area. In 1896 the first Greek, John Cocoris, arrived and he brought his brothers in 1901.
