= Cheyney University =

Public historically black university in Cheyney, Pennsylvania, US

Coordinates: 39.932°N 75.529°W

Cheyney University of Pennsylvania
- Former names: African Institute; Institute for Colored Youth; Cheyney State Normal School; Cheyney Training School for Teachers; Cheyney State Teachers College; Cheyney State College
- Motto: Building Tomorrow, Today
- Type: Public historically black university
- Established: 1837; 189 years ago
- Parent institution: Pennsylvania State System of Higher Education
- Academic affiliations: Space-grant
- Chancellor: Christopher M. Fiorentino
- President: Aaron A. Walton
- Provost: Denise Pearson
- Undergraduates: 851 (fall 2025)
- Location: Cheyney, Pennsylvania, United States
- Campus: 275 acres (1.11 km^{2}); Rural
- Colors: Blue and white
- Nickname: Wolves
- Sporting affiliations: Independent
- Website: cheyney.edu
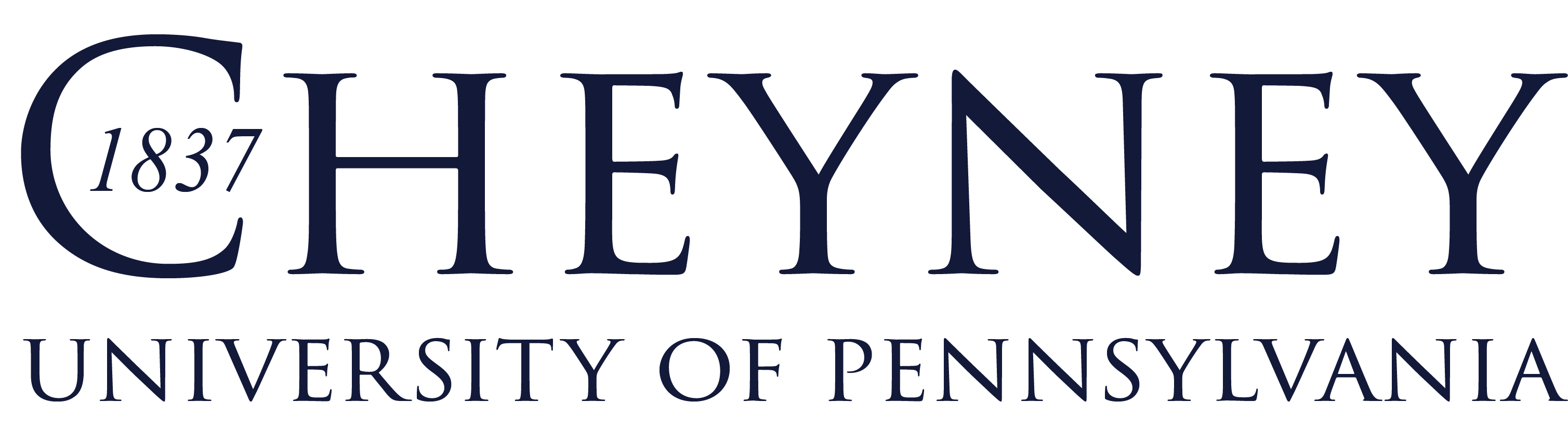

Cheyney University of Pennsylvania (CU) is a public historically black university in Cheyney, Pennsylvania, United States. Founded in 1837 as the Institute for Colored Youth, it is the oldest of all historically black colleges and universities (HBCUs) in the United States. It is a member of the Pennsylvania State System of Higher Education and the Thurgood Marshall College Fund. The university offers bachelor's degrees and is accredited by the Middle States Commission on Higher Education.

== History ==
Cheyney University's antecedent was established within the City of Philadelphia as the African Institute in February 1837 and renamed the Institute for Colored Youth (ICY) in April 1837. The African Institute was founded by Richard Humphreys, a Quaker philanthropist who bequeathed $10,000 (equivalent to $322,500 in 2025), one-tenth of his estate, to design and establish a school to educate people of African descent and prepare them as teachers.

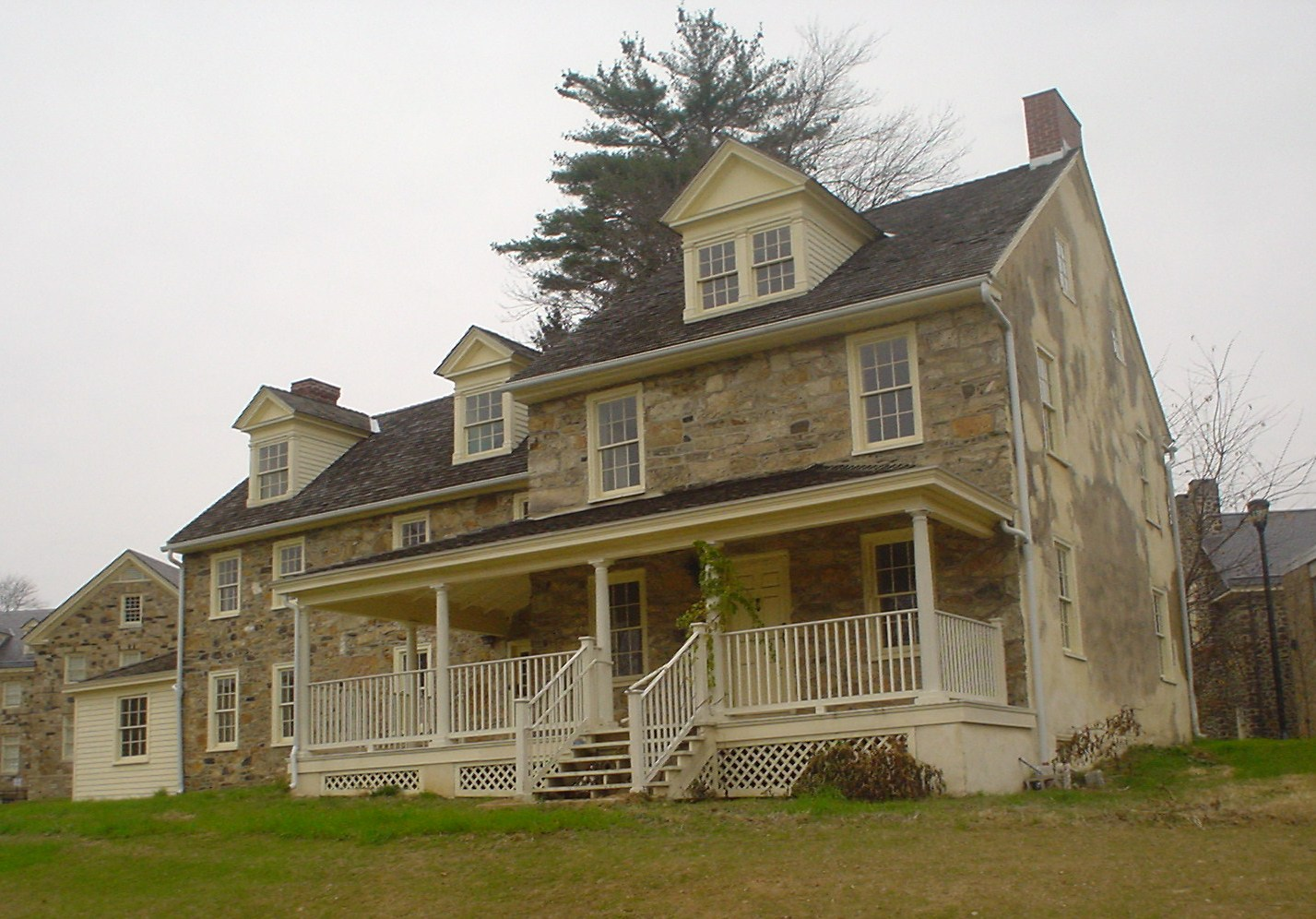
Melrose Cottage, built in 1805

Born on a plantation on Tortola, an island in the British West Indies, Humphreys came to Philadelphia in 1764. Many Quakers were abolitionists, and he became concerned about the struggles of free people of color to make a living and gain education in a discriminatory society. News of a race riot against free African-Americans in Cincinnati, Ohio, in 1829 inspired Humphreys to bequeath money in his will for higher education for free blacks. He charged thirteen fellow Quakers to design an institution "to instruct the descendants of the African Race in school learning, in the various branches of the mechanic Arts, trades and Agriculture, in order to prepare and fit and qualify them to act as teachers ..."

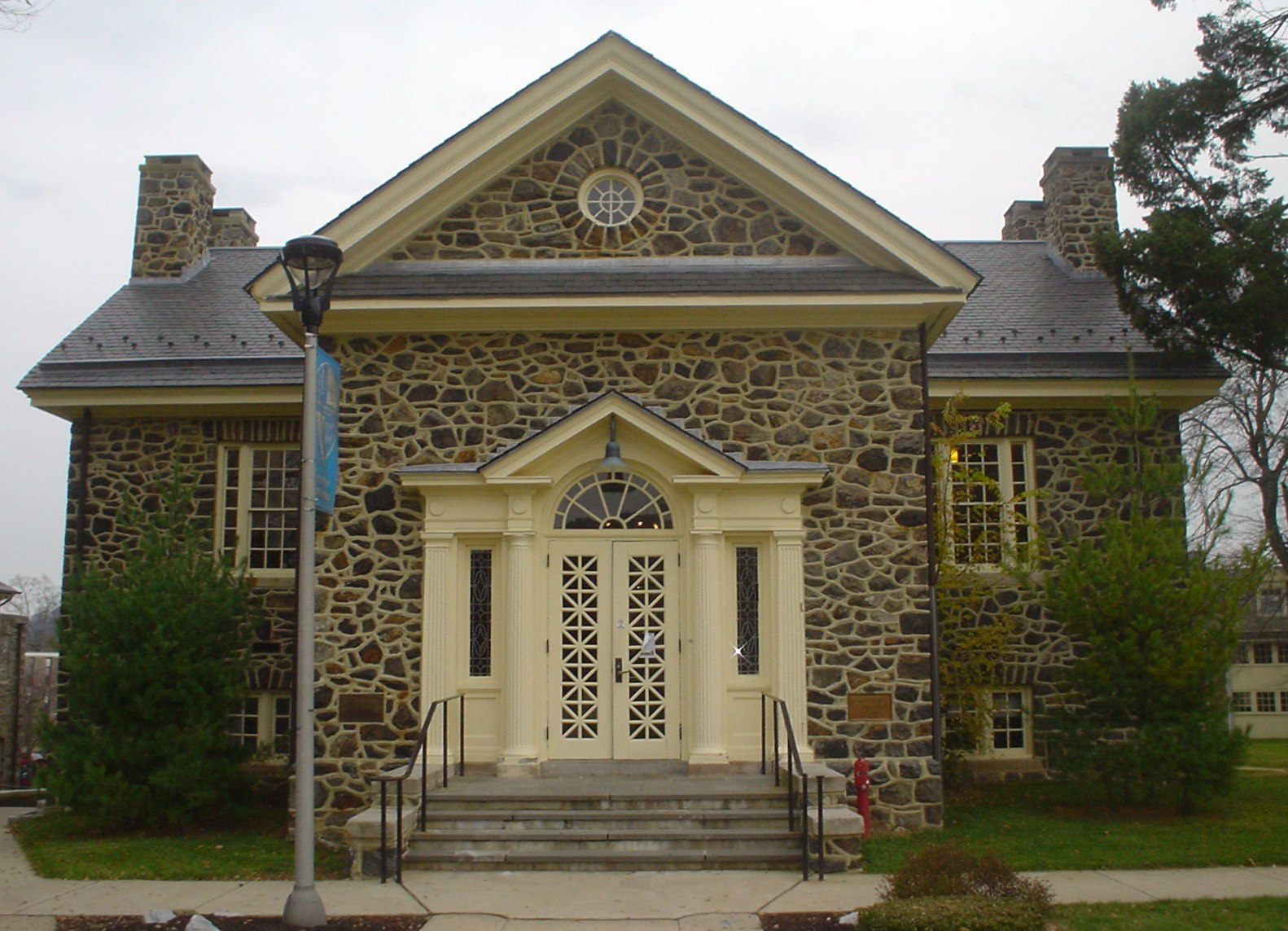
Library

Founded as the African Institute, the school was soon renamed the Institute for Colored Youth. In its early years, it provided training in trades and agriculture, as those were the predominant skills needed in the general economy. In 1902, the prominent Cheney family donated land that allowed the institute to relocate to George Cheyney's farm, a 275-acre property 25 miles (40 km) west of Philadelphia, straddling the Delaware County/Chester County line. The name "Cheyney" became associated with the school in 1913. The school's official name changed several times during the 20th century. In 1983, Cheyney was taken into the State System of Higher Education as Cheyney University of Pennsylvania.

The university has traditionally offered opportunities to many students from Philadelphia's inner city schools. Its alumni have close ties in the city and state. It became part of a 1980 civil rights lawsuit against the state government; it alleged that the state had unlawfully underfunded the historically black university. The suit was settled 19 years later in 1999. This was five years after the U.S. Department of Education's Office of Civil Rights began investigating states "that once practiced segregation in higher education and were never officially found to have eliminated it." In the settlement, the state agreed to provide $35 million to Cheyney over a five-year period, particularly for construction of needed buildings and academic development. By comparison, the university had an annual budget of about $23 million at the time.

In November 2015, the Middle States Commission on Higher Education placed Cheyney University on probation. Three years later, the commission placed the university on "show cause" status which required the university to show cause by November 21, 2019, for showing compliance with the commission's standards or accreditation would not be renewed. The accreditation concerns were driven by the university's financial woes, a concern the university sought to address in part with increased fundraising.

On November 21, 2019, the Middle States Commission on Higher Education reaffirmed Cheyney's accreditation as "...the institution is now in compliance with Standard VI (Planning, Resources, and Institutional Improvement) and Requirement of Affiliation 11." Four years later, in 2023, the commission again placed Cheyney on probation and warned that accreditation was in jeopardy because of insufficient evidence that it was complying with a number of standards. The warning was lifted the following year.

=== Presidents ===
- Aaron A. Walton, 13th president (May 2017–present)
- Frank Pogue, 12th president (October 2014–May 2017)
- Phyllis Worthy Dawkins, acting president (2014)
- Michelle R. Howard-Vital, 11th president (2007–2014)
- Wallace C. Arnold, 10th president (2004–2007)
- W. Clinton Pettus, 9th president (1996–2004)
- Donald Leopold Mullett, interim president (1995–1996)
- H. Douglas Covington, 8th president (1992–1995)
- Valarie Swain-Cade McCoullum (interim), 7th president (1991–1992)
- LeVerne McCummings, 6th president (1985–1991)
- Wade Wilson, president (1968–1981)
- Leroy Banks Allen (1965–1968)
- James Henry Duckery (1951–1965)
- Leslie Pinckney Hill, founder and president of then Cheyney State Teachers College (1913–1951)

=== Principals ===
- Hugh M. Browne, 4th principal (1902–1913)
- Fanny Jackson Coppin, 3rd principal (1869–1902)
- Ebenezer Bassett, 2nd principal (1857–1869)
- Charles L. Reason, 1st principal of the Institute for Colored Youth (1852–1856)

== Campus ==
The university is partially in Thornbury Township, Chester County, and partially in Thornbury Township, Delaware County.

== Athletics ==
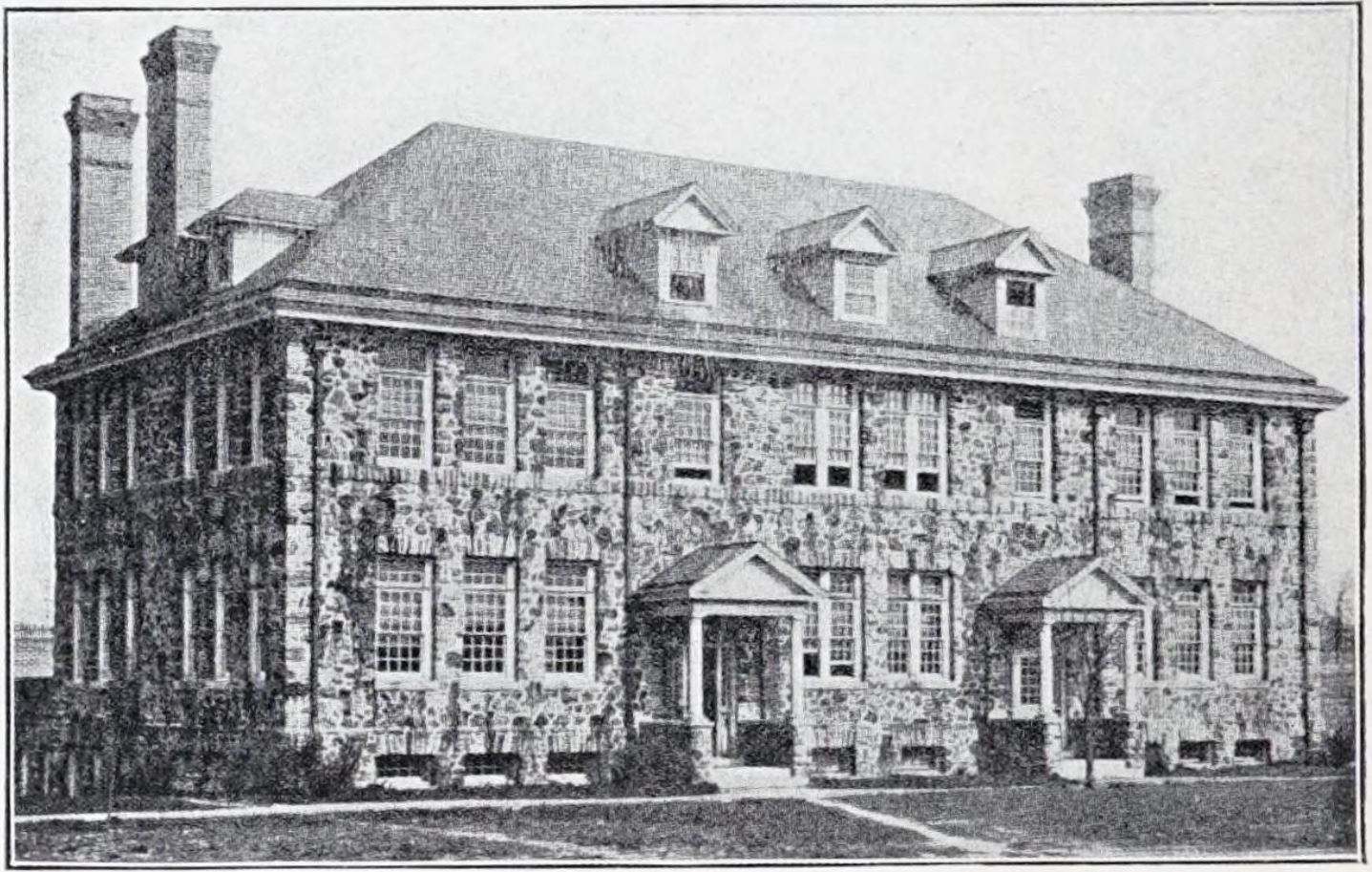
Humphreys Hall

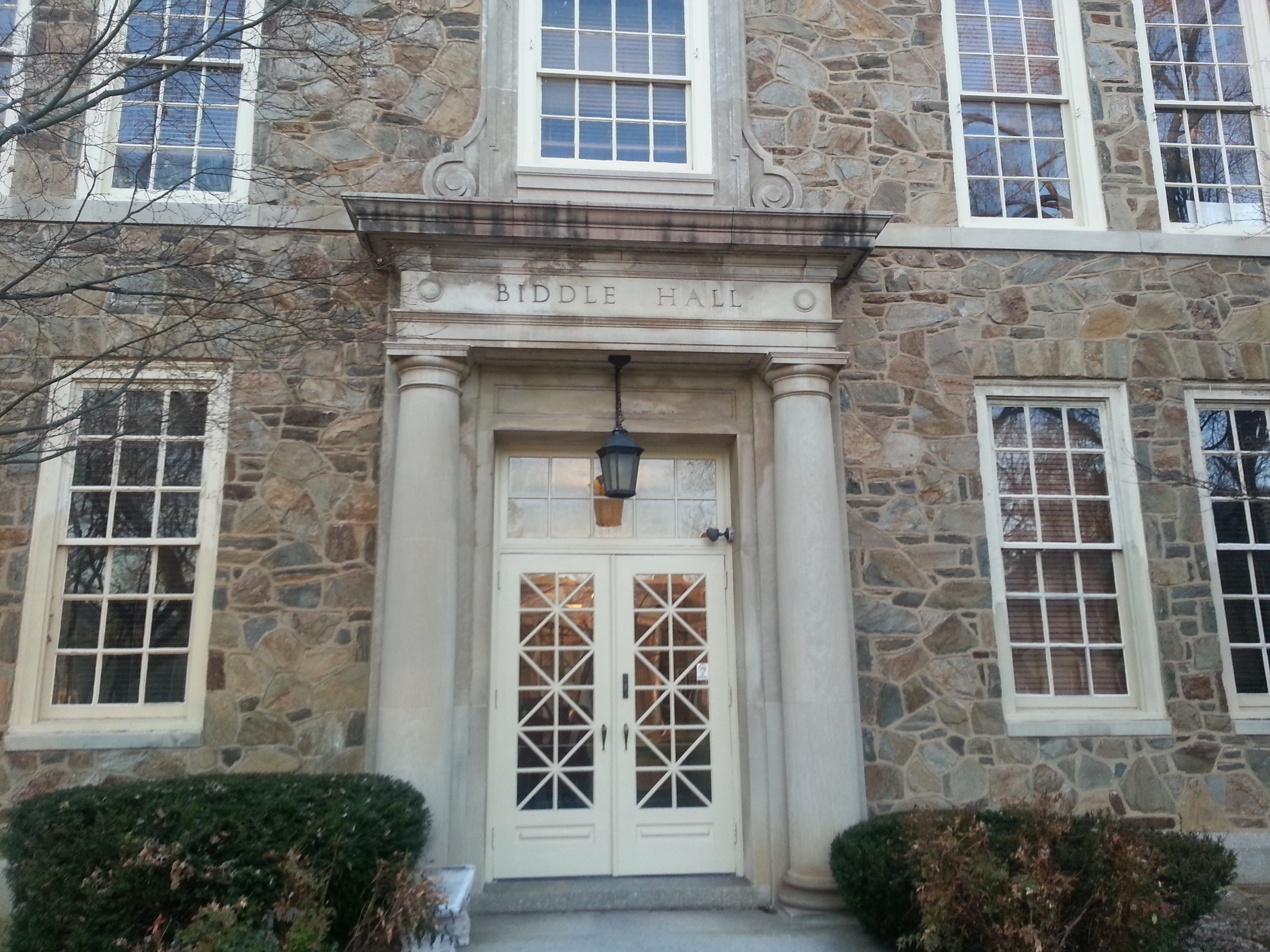
Biddle Hall

Cheyney University has one of the most storied basketball programs in NCAA Division II history. The men's basketball program is 7th all-time in NCAA win percentage, including 16 PSAC conference championships, four Final Fours, and one National Championship (1978). The women's basketball team in 1982 competed in the championship game of the inaugural NCAA Division I tournament despite being a Division II school.

In 2009, Cheyney University hired the first ever NCAA men's and women's basketball coaches who are brother and sister. The men's coach was Dominique Stephens, a North Carolina Central University graduate and member of the NCAA Division II Basketball Championship team, and the women's coach was Marilyn Stephens, the Temple University Hall of Famer.

During the 2007–2008 through 2010–2011 academic years, the university violated NCAA rules in the certification of initial, transfer and continuing eligibility involving all sports programs. During the four-year period, numerous student-athletes competed while ineligible due to improper certification. In amateurism certification alone, 109 student-athletes practiced, competed and received travel expenses and/or athletically related financial aid before the university received their amateurism certification status from the NCAA Eligibility Center. The committee also concluded that a former compliance director failed to monitor when she did not follow proper procedures in the certification of student-athletes’ eligibility. The entire athletics program was on probation until August 2019. In spring 2018, the team withdrew from Division II and played the following season as an independent, citing financial problems.

== Student life ==
Undergraduate demographics as of fall 2023
Race and ethnicity	Total
Black	86%
Two or more races	7%
Hispanic	3%
Unknown	2%
Asian	1%
White	1%
Economic diversity
Low-income (Note: The percentage of students who received an income-based federal Pell grant intended for low-income students.)	55%
Affluent (Note: The percentage of students who are a part of the American middle class at the bare minimum.)	45%

All nine National Pan-Hellenic Council (NPHC) organizations are present on Cheyney University's campus.

== See also ==
- Lincoln University, Pennsylvania's other historically black university
