= William J. Barnard Residence =

Historic house in Pennsylvania, United States

- U.S. National Register of Historic Places
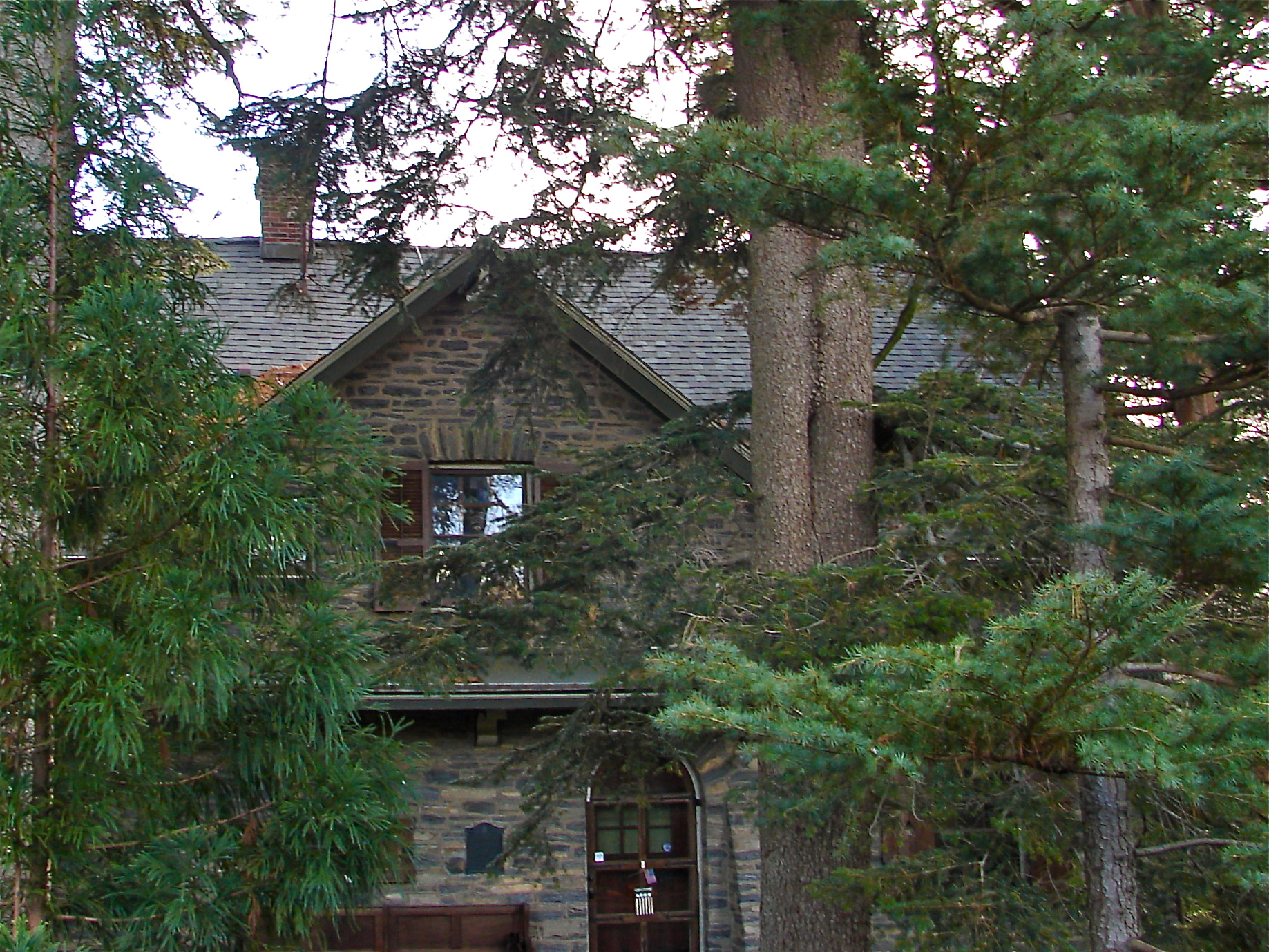
- William J. Barnard Residence, December 2010

- Location within Pennsylvania Location within the United States
- Location: 920 E. Street Rd., Thornbury Township, Pennsylvania
- Coordinates: 39°55′59″N 75°32′46″W
- Area: 4.4 acres (1.8 ha)
- Built: 1900, 1907
- Architect: Jackson, W.E.
- NRHP reference No.: 82003779
- Added to NRHP: July 21, 1982

The William J. Barnard Residence, also known as Green Shadows and the Thornbury Lodge, is an historic home that is located in Thornbury Township, Chester County, Pennsylvania, United States.

It was listed on the National Register of Historic Places in 1982.

== History and architectural features ==
Designed by W.E. Jackson in 1900, this historic building was completed in 1907. Jackson was a student of Wilson Eyre, a noted Philadelphia architect. This building is a two-story, banked stone dwelling that is faced in rubble "Brandywine Granite." It features a steeply pitched slate gable roof with cross gable. Also located on the property is a contributing former stable that was converted to a residence known as Green Echo.
