= John Cocoris =

Greek businessman

John Cocoris

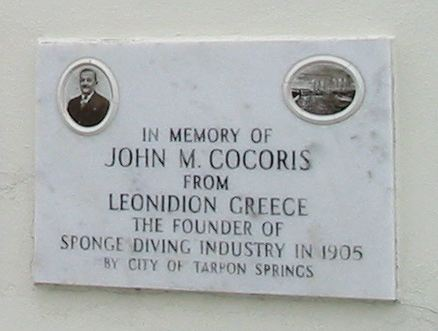
Plaque in Tarpon Springs, Florida, commemorating Cocoris.

John Michael Cocoris (Greek: Γιάννης Μιχάλης Κόκκορης; September 17, 1877 – 1944) was a Greek businessman.

Born in Leonidio, he came to New York City in 1895 to work in the sponge trade. In 1896, he worked with John K. Cheyney in Tarpon Springs, Florida. In 1905, he introduced sponge diving to the area and recruited Greek sponge divers from the Dodecanese Islands. By the 1930s, the sponge industry of Tarpon Springs was very productive, generating millions of dollars a year.

He died in 1944 in Duval County, Florida.

== See also ==
- Greek American
