= Thornbury Township, Delaware County, Pennsylvania =

Township in Pennsylvania, US

- Township
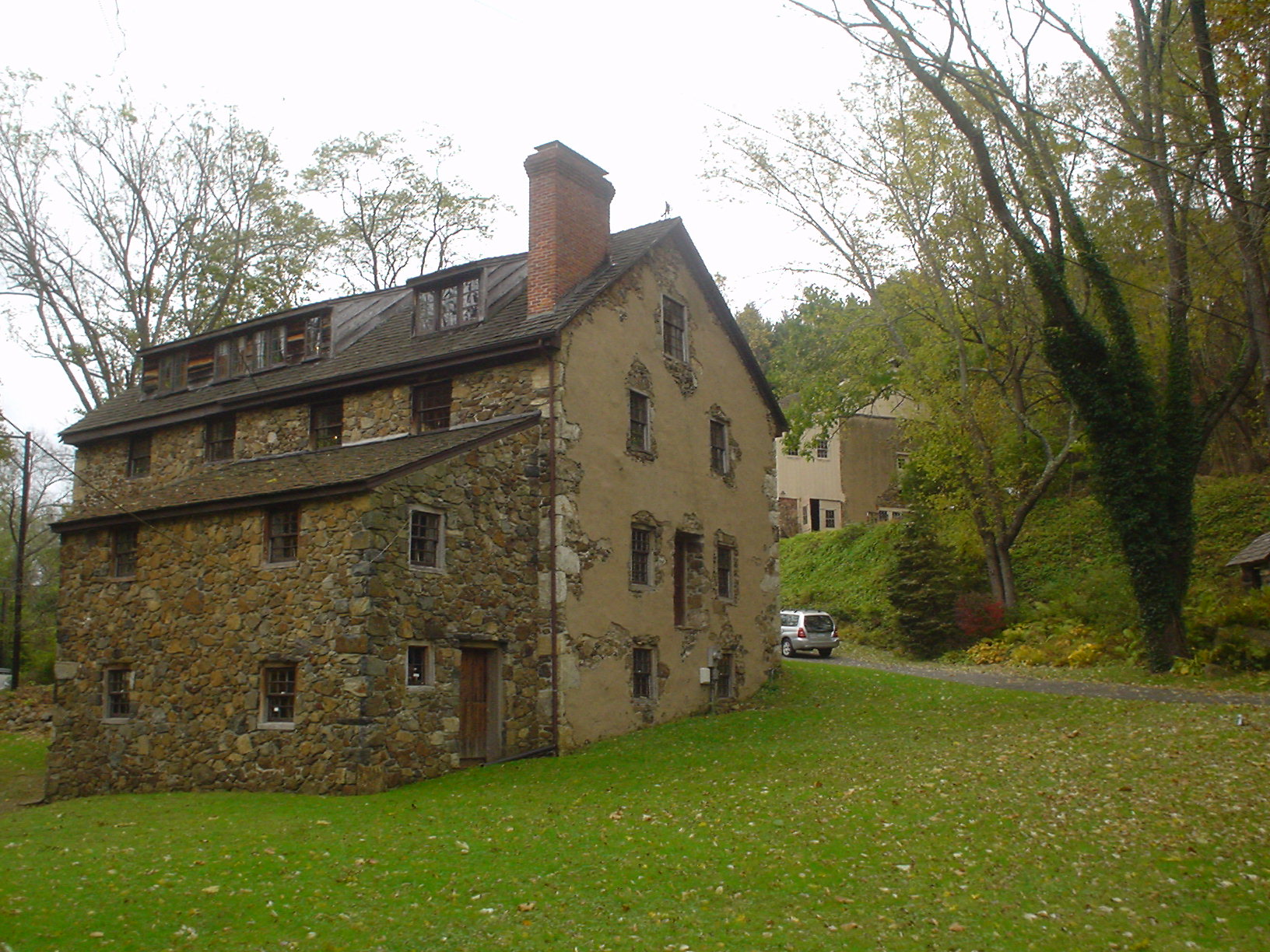
- Locksley Mill in Thornbury Township

- Location in Delaware County and the U.S. state of Pennsylvania
- Coordinates: 39°55′37″N 75°29′55″W
- Country: United States
- State: Pennsylvania
- County: Delaware
- Established: 1685

Area
  - Total: 9.27 sq mi (24.00 km^{2})
  - Land: 9.24 sq mi (23.92 km^{2})
  - Water: 0.031 sq mi (0.08 km^{2})
- Elevation: 335 ft (102 m)

Population (2010)
  - Total: 8,028
  - Estimate (2016): 7,670
  - Density: 830.5/sq mi (320.64/km^{2})
- Time zone: UTC-5 (EST)
  - Summer (DST): UTC-4 (EDT)
- Area code: 610
- FIPS code: 42-045-76576
- Website: www.thornbury.org

Thornbury Township is a township in Delaware County, Pennsylvania, United States. As of the 2010 U.S. census, the population was 8,028, up from 7,093 at the 2000 census. It is adjacent to, and was once joined with, Thornbury Township in Chester County. It includes part of the census designated place of Cheyney University.

== Geography ==
Thornbury Township is in western Delaware County. It is bordered by Thornbury Township, Chester County to the north and northwest, Edgmont Township to the east, Middletown Township to the southeast, Concord Township, and Chester Heights to the south and Chadds Ford Township to the southwest. According to the U.S. Census Bureau, the township has a total area of 9.3 square miles (24.0 km^{2}), of which 9.2 square miles (23.9 km^{2}) is land and 0.04 square miles (0.1 km^{2}), or 0.34%, is water.

Waterways in Thornbury Township include Brinton Lake and Chester Creek.

== Demographics ==
Historical population
Census	Pop.	Note	%±
1930	1,504		—
1940	1,466		−2.5%
1950	2,101		43.3%
1960	2,035		−3.1%
1970	3,284		61.4%
1980	3,653		11.2%
1990	5,056		38.4%
2000	7,093		40.3%
2010	8,028		13.2%
2020	6,904		−14.0%
U.S. Decennial Census

As of 2010 census, the racial makeup of the township was 72.4% White, 20.6% African American, 0.2% Native American, 4.1% Asian, 1.1% from other races, and 1.6% from two or more races. Hispanic or Latino of any race were 2.4% of the population .

As of the census of 2000, there were 7,093 people, 1,360 households, and 1,153 families residing in the township. The population density was 769.1 inhabitants per square mile (297.0/km^{2}). There were 1,387 housing units at an average density of 150.4 per square mile (58.1/km^{2}). The racial makeup of the township was 64.68% White, 31.09% African American, 0.11% Native American, 1.27% Asian, 0.06% Pacific Islander, 2.10% from other races, and 0.69% from two or more races. Hispanic or Latino of any race were 2.72% of the population.

There were 1,360 households, out of which 44.5% had children under the age of 18 living with them, 77.9% were married couples living together, 4.9% had a female householder with no husband present, and 15.2% were non-families. 12.1% of all households were made up of individuals, and 5.8% had someone living alone who was 65 years of age or older. The average household size was 3.03 and the average family size was 3.33.

In the township, the population was spread out, with 27.7% under the age of 18, 20.5% from 18 to 24, 27.5% from 25 to 44, 18.0% from 45 to 64, and 6.2% who were 65 years of age or older. The median age was 27 years. For every 100 females, there were 172.9 males. For every 100 females age 18 and over, there were 160.5 males.

The median income for a household in the township was $82,441, and the median income for a family was $91,179. Males had a median income of $65,671 versus $36,750 for females. The per capita income for the township was $21,987. About 0.9% of families and 14.2% of the population were below the poverty line, including 0.8% of those under age 18 and 2.0% of those age 65 or over.

== History ==
Thornbury Township lies in the drainage area of the Delaware River, named in honor of Thomas West, governor of the colony of Virginia. The river and its bay were explored by Henry Hudson in 1609, and over the next several decades the region was variously claimed by the Swedes, the Dutch, and the English. Its original human inhabitants were the Lenni-Lenape tribe of American Indians.

Once the Dutch were defeated, King Charles II of England made his grant to William Penn in order to found the colony which came to be named Pennsylvania. The land within the present boundaries of Thornbury Township was taken up by "first purchasers" from William Penn. The original grant documents were copper-plate prints on parchment; some still survive and show a price of 100 English pounds for 5,000 acres (2,000 ha).

The Court of Equity in Chester recognized a separate Thornbury Township in 1687, and appointed township officers. At the time, the area was in Chester County, one of the original counties chartered by William Penn; Delaware County had not yet been formed. Thornbury was named after the English birthplace of the wife of George Pearce, who in 1685 had been granted title to 490 acres (200 ha) in the township.

The Battle of Brandywine, the only major battle of the American Revolution fought in Pennsylvania, was within sight and sound of the western part of the township; follow-up military operations took place in the township (see below).

In 1769, the Pennsylvania Assembly authorized the division of Chester County and the creation of Delaware County. In plotting the boundary between the two, Thornbury Township was divided. Border landowners were asked if they wished to remain in Chester County or be in Delaware County. The line thus drawn was quite irregular, and as a result, the northern boundary of the Delaware County township (like the southern boundary of its Chester County counterpart) is distinctly jagged (see map).

Thornbury Township was enlarged by annexing the northern portion of Aston Township in 1837; that township was dissolved. The boundaries of Thornbury have remained unchanged since. The township is the location of "Thornbury" house, home of Revolutionary War figure Persifor Frazer. After the Battle of Brandywine, his wife Mary stood down a British raiding party in a celebrated incident. The house and barn survived the war, but are now in ruins.

Chester Creek Historic District, John Cheney Log Tenant House and Farm, Melrose, and Thornton Village Historic District are listed on the National Register of Historic Places.

In September 2000, the Delaware Nation of Oklahoma received 11.5 acres of land in Thornbury Township.

== Government and infrastructure ==
The George W. Hill Correctional Facility (Delaware County Prison) is partially located in the township. Another section is in Concord Township.

The U.S. Postal Service operates the Cheyney, Glen Mils, and Thornton post offices.

== Education ==
Cheyney University of Pennsylvania is partially located in Thornbury Township, Delaware County, and partially in Thornbury Township, Chester County.

West Chester Area School District serves the township. Three elementary schools serve sections of the township: Penn Wood, Sarah Starkweather, and Westtown-Thornbury. All residents are zoned to Stetson Middle School and Bayard Rustin High School.

The area library is the Rachel Kohl Library.

== Transportation ==
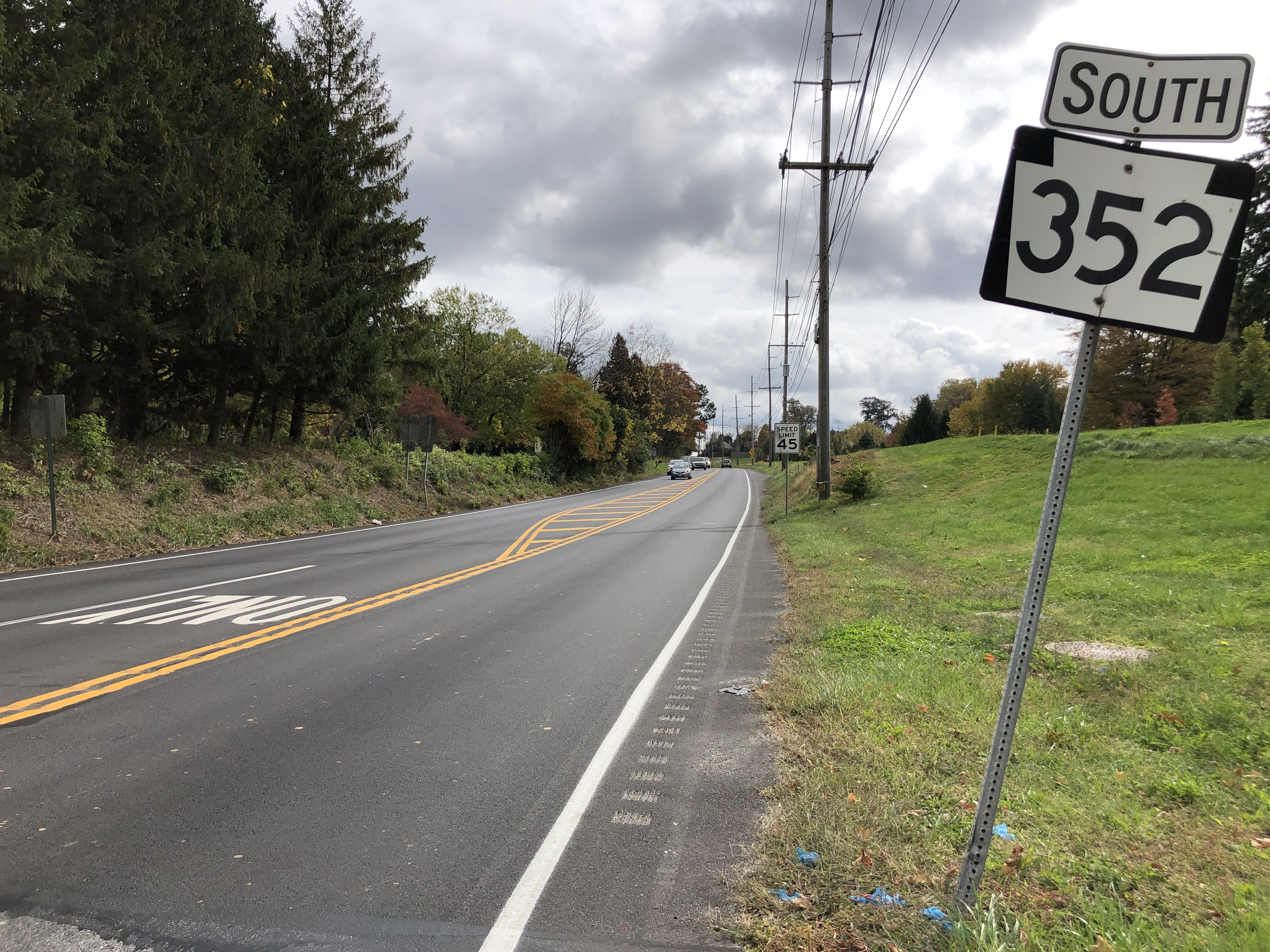
PA 352 southbound in Thornbury Township

As of 2020, there were 50.44 miles (81.18 km) of public roads in Thornbury Township, of which 20.93 miles (33.68 km) were maintained by Pennsylvania Department of Transportation (PennDOT) and 29.51 miles (47.49 km) were maintained by the township.

Thornbury Township is bordered by Pennsylvania Route 926 to the northwest. Pennsylvania Route 352 cuts through the northeast section of Thornbury Township.

== Notable people ==
- Persifor Frazer
- Joseph Hemphill

== Community ==
Glen Mills Schools, a residential facility for male juvenile delinquents, is in Thornbury Township.
