= Douglas Covington =

American educator (1935–2012)

Harold Douglas Covington (1935-2012) served as chancellor or president of several universities in the United States including 10 years at Radford University, where he was the first African-American president of a predominantly white state-owned university in Virginia.

Born in Winston-Salem, North Carolina, he moved with his family to Ohio, where he graduated from historically Black, Central State University in Wilberforce, Ohio, and earned master's and doctoral degrees at Ohio State University in 1958 and 1966.

He served as chancellor of Winston-Salem State University 1977-84 and as president of Alabama A&M University 1984–87, and Cheyney University in Pennsylvania, 1992–95. He also was a vice president at Tuskegee Institute.

He was the fifth president of Radford, serving from 1995 to 2005, and was a tenured professor of psychology and education. After retirement, he briefly served as interim president of Emory & Henry College in Emory, Virginia.

In 2008, Radford named a new performing arts building the Douglas and Beatrice Covington Center for the Visual and Performing Arts. The H. Douglas & Beatrice M. Covington Endowed Scholarship in the Performing Arts is also named after the couple.

At Winston-Salem State University, Covington Hall, a co-ed living and learning community building, is named after him. He was WSSU's chancellor from 1977 to 1984, and is credited with raising funds for student scholarships and strengthening the nursing program.

The Ohio State library holds his thesis and dissertation:

"A comparative study of students' acquisition of information presented in comic form and that presented in prose," 1958, M.A. thesis.

"A comparative study of children's perceptions of parental acceptance and their educational success," 1966, Ph.D. dissertation.

A collection of his speeches and other papers is preserved at Radford University's McConnell Library.

Buried at Roselawn Memorial Gardens Christiansburg, Montgomery County, Virginia, USA
