= Chester Creek Historic District =

Historic district in Pennsylvania, United States

- U.S. National Register of Historic Places
- U.S. Historic district
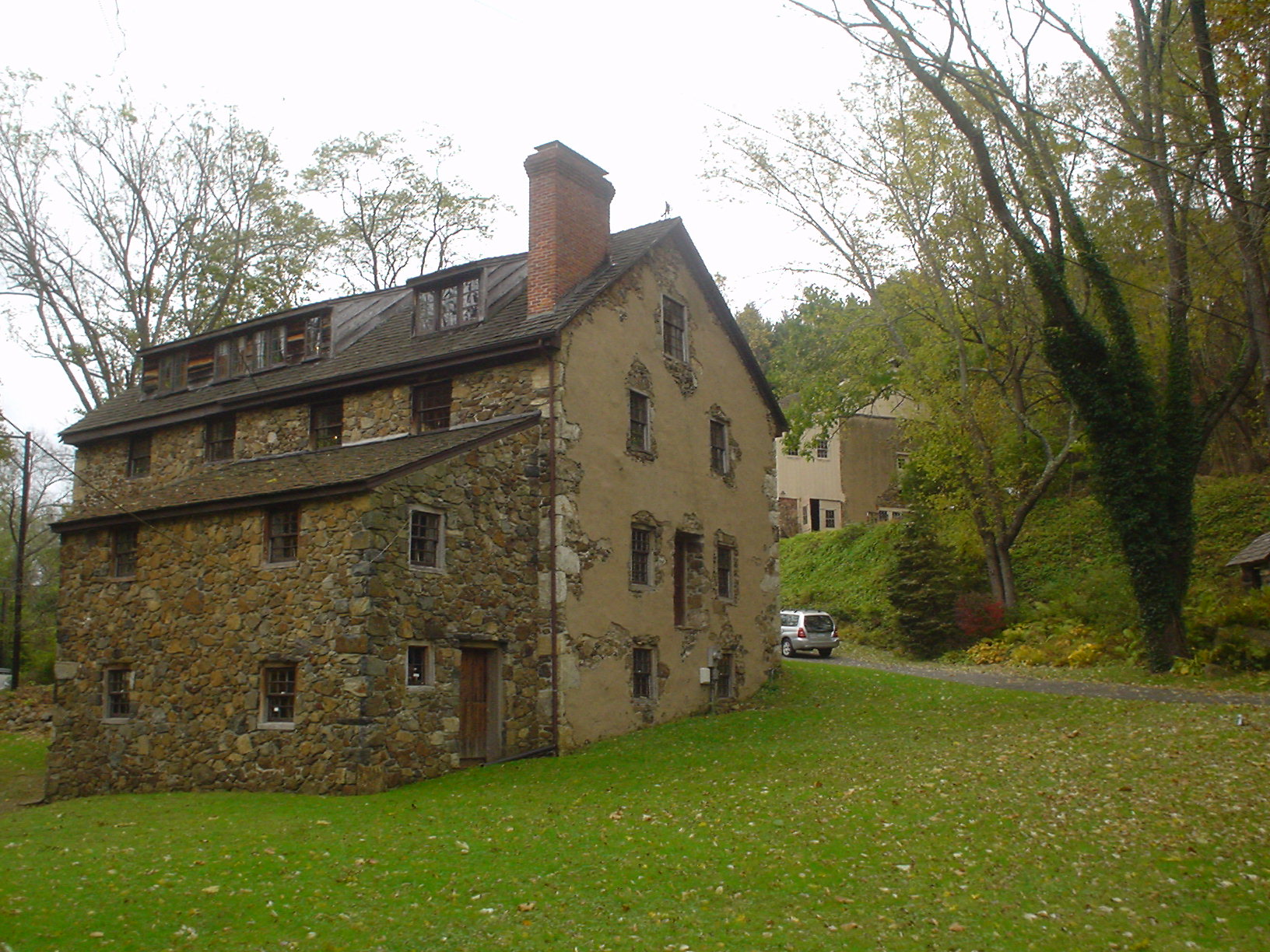
- Chester Creek Historic District, November 2009

- Location within Pennsylvania Location within the United States
- Location: N, E, and S of Glen Mills along the W branch of Chester Creek, Thornbury Township, Pennsylvania
- Coordinates: 39°55′23″N 75°29′27″W
- Area: 512 acres (207 ha)
- Architect: Multiple
- Architectural style: Early Republic, Late Victorian
- NRHP reference No.: 72001120
- Added to NRHP: March 24, 1972

Chester Creek Historic District is a national historic district located along the west branch of Chester Creek at Thornbury Township, Delaware County, Pennsylvania. The district includes 52 contributing buildings and 5 structures associated with the early settlement and industrial development of the Chester Creek valley. Notable buildings and structures include the Yarnall Bank House, Locksley Mill and Manor House (1704), John Edwards House, Glen Mills Station (1882), Station House and Store (c. 1882), Willcox Mills (c. 1850), Workers' Cottages (c. 1830-1880), Daniel Broomall House, and the Hemphill House.

It was added to the National Register of Historic Places in 1972.
