= Martha Ibbetson Gray =

Caregiver during the American Revolutionary War

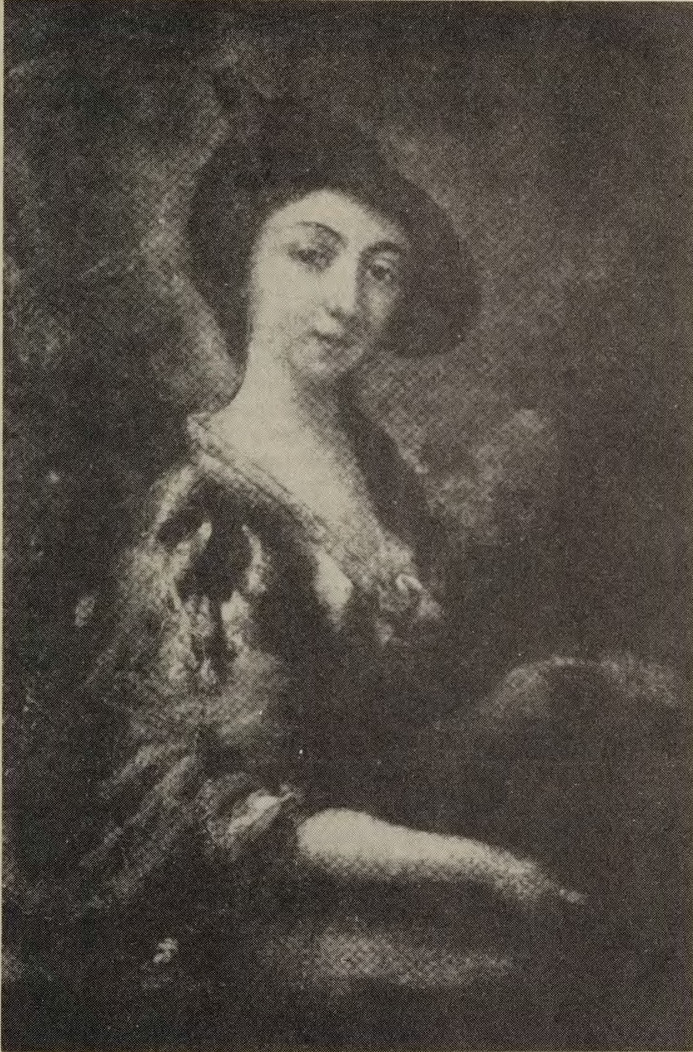
- Born: January 28, 1734; London
- Died: June 27, 1781
- Spouse: George Gray

Martha Ibbetson Gray (January 28, 1734 – June 27, 1781) was an American woman known for her care of wounded soldiers at the Walnut Street Prison during the American Revolutionary War.

Martha Ibbetson was born on January 28, 1734 in London into a Moravian family. She was the daughter of Robert Ibbetson and Margaret Coultas Ibbetson. She received some training under an apothecary surgeon in England. In 1749, the Ibbetson family emigrated to the Pennsylvania Colony. In 1752 she married George Gray, a wealthy politician who advocated for the revolutionary cause. They were married in Whitby Hall, the Philadelphia estate built by her material grandfather, James Coultas. They had thirteen children, two of which died in infancy.

During the Revolutionary War, British forces imprisoned captured American troops in the Walnut Street Prison in Philadelphia. Gray provided medical care and food to these prisoners at her own expense. At one point, she was accused of being a spy and banished from Philadelphia, but she successfully appealed that decision to William Howe, 5th Viscount Howe.

Martha Ibbetson Gray died on 27 June 1781.
