= George W. Hill Correctional Facility =

Prison in Delaware County, Pennsylvania, United States

Coordinates: 39.90289°N 75.51417°W

- Interactive map of George W. Hill Correctional Facility
- Location: 500 Cheyney Road, Thornton, Pennsylvania, U.S.
- Status: Open
- Capacity: 1883
- Opened: 1998
- Former name: Broadmeadows; Delaware County Prison
- Managed by: Delaware County
- Warden: Laura Williams

George W. Hill Correctional Facility is a county jail and prison located in Delaware County, Pennsylvania, in the townships of Thornbury and Concord. It has a Thornton postal address, and is within the Philadelphia metropolitan area.

Founded in 1998, the jail was previously managed and operated by Boca Raton, Florida's GEO Group until 2009 and was run by West Caldwell, New Jersey based company, Community Education Centers (CEC). In April 2017, GEO Group completed an acquisition of CEC, regaining management of the prison. Currently, the facility is managed by Delaware County, which took back control of the jail as of April 6, 2022 and generally houses inmates with sentences of two years less one day each or state sentences of five years less one day each. The facility was Pennsylvania's last privately operated county jail.

The jail occupies fewer than 144 acres (58 ha) of land on a more than 414-acre (168 ha) plot of county property.

== Controversy ==
Between 2005 and 2008, at least eight people died when GEO Group-operated the facility. Several of those deaths resulted in lawsuits by family members who said the facility did not provide adequate medical care or proper supervision for offenders. On December 31, 2008, GEO pulled out of operations at this facility, "citing underperformance and frequent litigations" as the reasons. According to the Delaware County Medical Examiner's office six suicides have occurred at George W. Hill since CEC took over operations of the facility in 2009.

The prison was reacquired by GEO Group in April 2017, after GEO group completed an acquisition of Community Education Centers.

== See also ==
- List of Pennsylvania state prisons
