= John Cheyney Log Tenant House and Farm =

Historic house in Pennsylvania, United States

- U.S. National Register of Historic Places
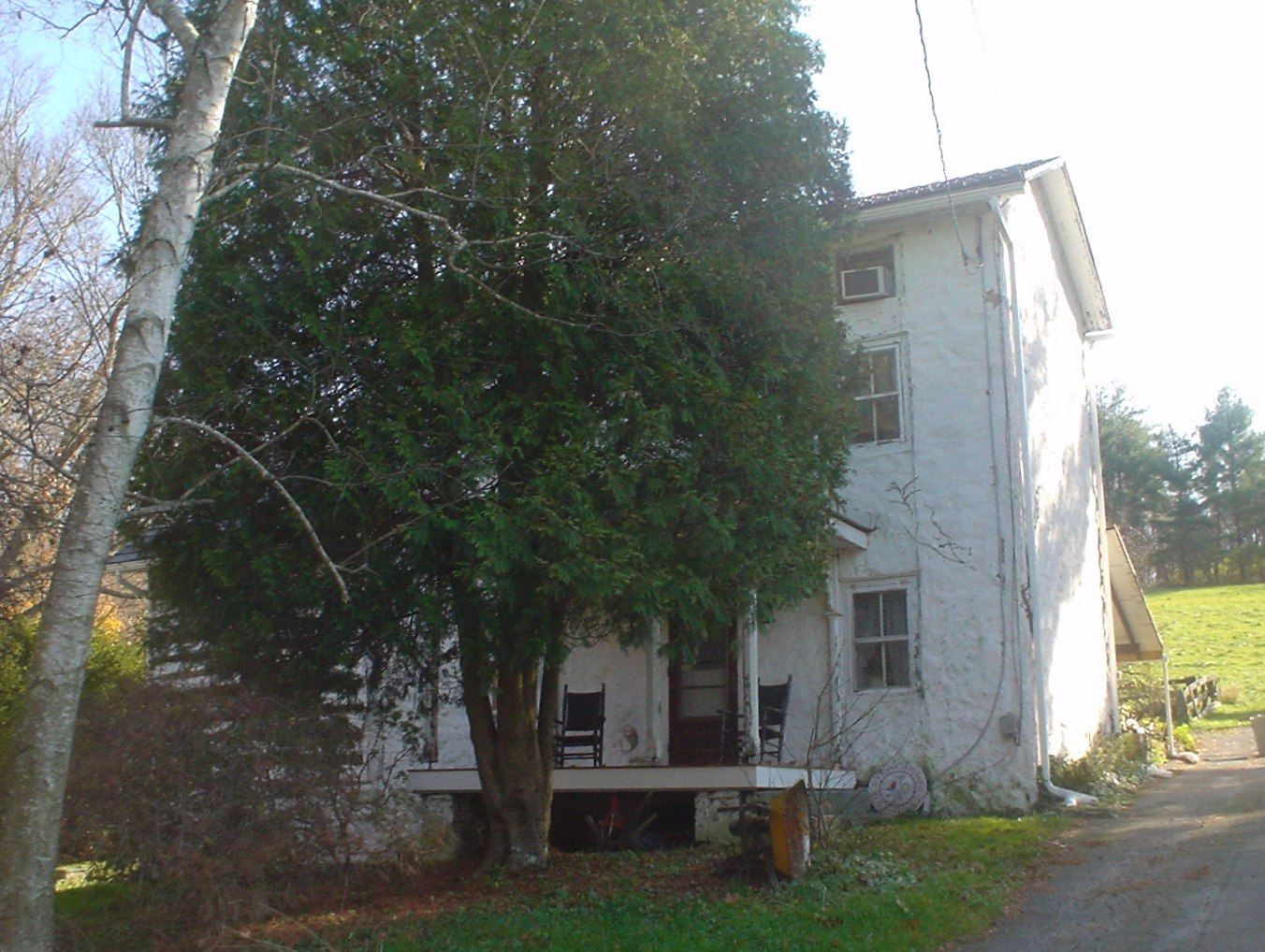
- John Cheyney Log Tenant House, November 2009

- Location within Pennsylvania Location within the United States
- Location: Station Rd., Cheyney, Pennsylvania
- Coordinates: 39°55′50″N 75°30′52″W
- Area: 16 acres (6.5 ha)
- Built: c. 1760 - c. 1870
- NRHP reference No.: 78002390
- Added to NRHP: November 21, 1978

The John Cheyney Log Tenant House and Farm, also known as the Thomas Huston Farm, is an historic home and associated buildings that are located in Cheyney, Delaware County, Pennsylvania, United States.

This complex was added to the National Register of Historic Places in 1978.

== History and architectural features ==
The John Cheyney Log Tenant House and Farm encompasses four contributing buildings, which date roughly from 1760 to 1870, including a part log, part stucco over stone, vernacular residence, a stone and frame barn, a "garage" containing a forge and farm kitchen, and a stone spring house. The residence, or tenant house, consists of a 1 1/2-story log section that was built circa 1800 and is connected to a three-story, stucco over stone section that was built between 1815 and 1848.
