= Melrose (Cheyney, Pennsylvania) =

Historic house in Pennsylvania, United States

- U.S. National Register of Historic Places
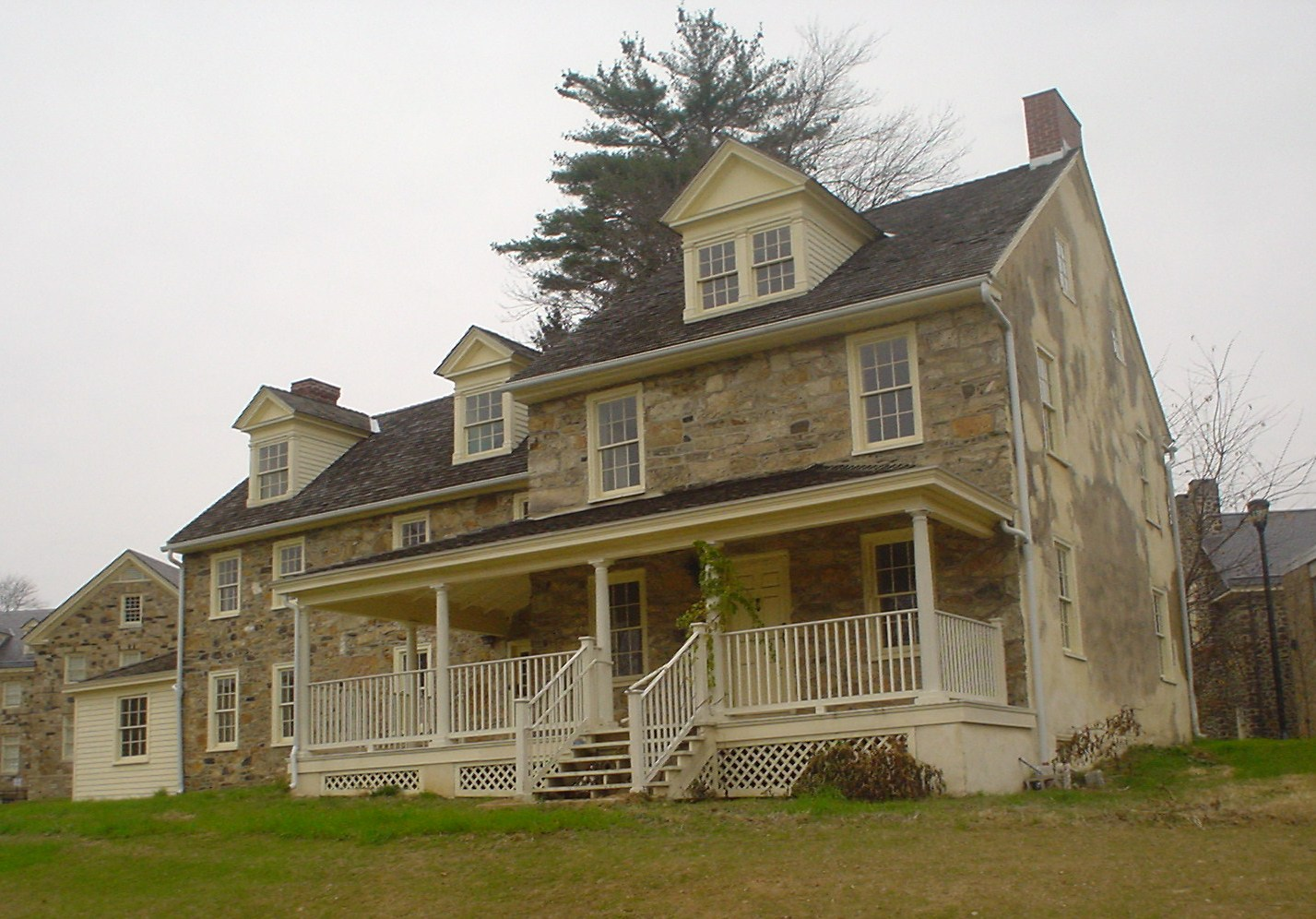
- "Melrose," November 2009

- Location within Pennsylvania Location within the United States
- Location: Hill Drive, Cheyney, Pennsylvania
- Coordinates: 39°55′56″N 75°31′38″W
- Area: 0.4 acres (0.16 ha)
- Built: 1785
- Architect: Jacob Vernon
- NRHP reference No.: 86001780
- Added to NRHP: September 4, 1986

"Melrose", also known as the Old President's House, is an historic home that is located on the campus of Cheyney University of Pennsylvania in Cheyney, Delaware County, Pennsylvania.

The house was added to the National Register of Historic Places in 1986.

== History and architectural features ==
This historic structure is a 2 1/2-story, vernacular, stone residence. It has three sections: the original section that was built before 1785, a three-bay addition that was built in 1807, and a two-bay addition that was built circa 1850. The 122-acre farm for which the house served as the main residence, became the basis for the Cheyney University of Pennsylvania campus. The house served as the President's House from 1903 to 1968.
