= Thornton Village Historic District =

Historic district in Pennsylvania, United States

- U.S. National Register of Historic Places
- U.S. Historic district
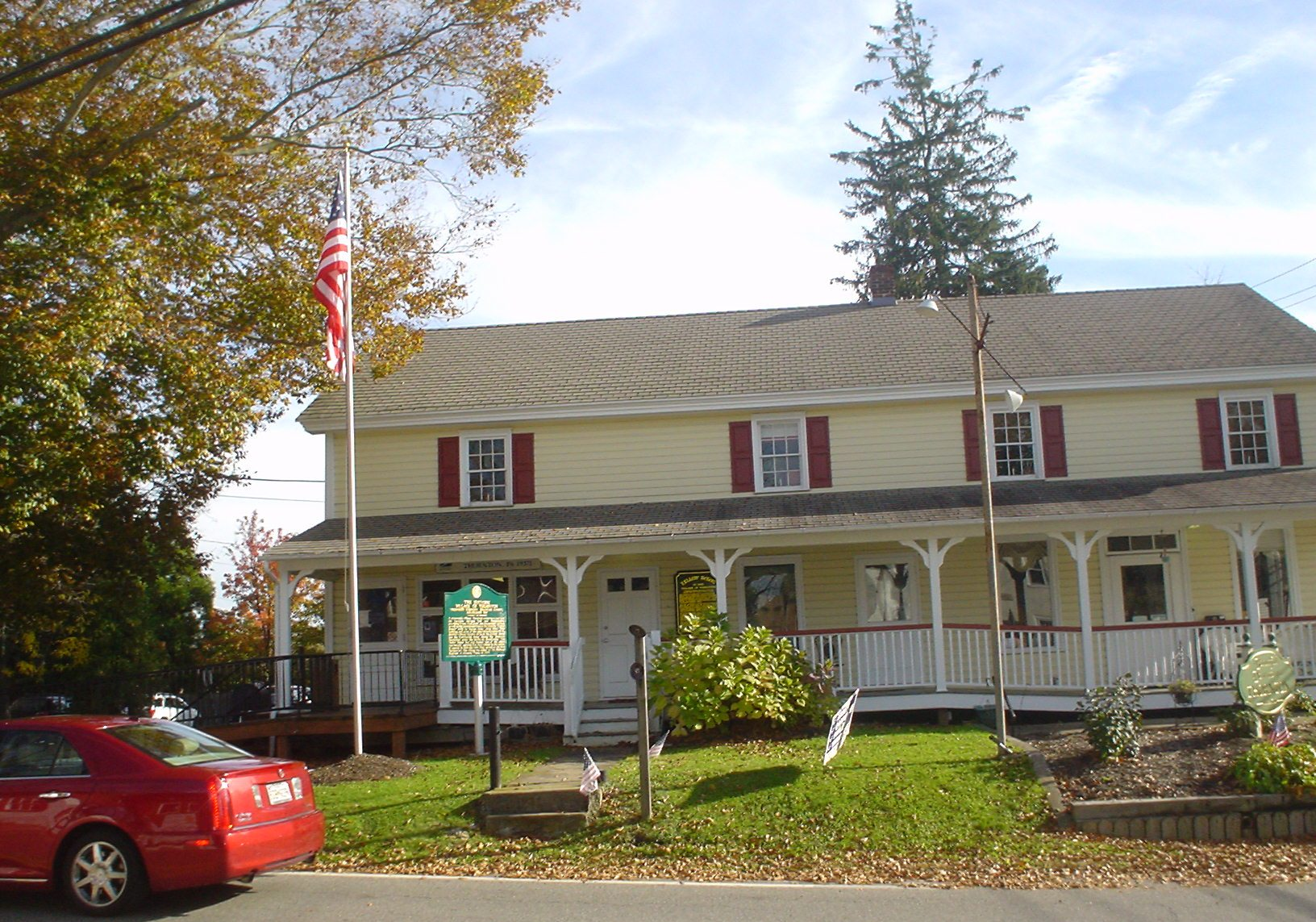
- Yellow House, October 2009

- Location within Pennsylvania Location within the United States
- Location: Centered on Thornton and Glen Mills Rds., Thornbury Township, Pennsylvania
- Coordinates: 39°54′36″N 75°31′54″W
- Area: 12 acres (4.9 ha)
- Built: c. 1750, c. 1777
- Architectural style: Colonial, Federal, et al.
- NRHP reference No.: 06000745
- Added to NRHP: November 14, 2006

The Thornton Village Historic District is a national historic district that is located in Thornbury Township, Delaware County, Pennsylvania. Situated in the crossroads at the intersection of Glen Mills and Thornton Roads in the village of Thornton, this district includes thirteen contributing buildings that were built between 1750 and 1855, some of which were created in the Federal style.

Among its structures, most of which face Glen Mills Road, are the Yellow House, one commercial building, seven residences, a converted blacksmith shop, a converted barn, three stables or carriage houses, and two frame sheds.

It was added to the National Register of Historic Places in 2006.

== Yellow House ==
Over the years, the Yellow House has served as tavern, post office, general store, grocery, textile factory, and hair salon.

The Yellow House opened as an inn and tavern about 1750; the surrounding village was known by the same name until it changed to Thornton. The Yellow House was originally owned by George Pearce. One of the important clients of the Yellow House Inn was George Gray, owner of Gray's Ferry over the Schuylkill River in Philadelphia. As the American Revolution proceeded, Gray moved his family away from Philadelphia to avoid the impending British Army occupation. Yet Gray's family could hear cannons during the Battle of Brandywine on September 11, 1777, and fleeing Continental Army troops came down the road right in front of the Yellow House. Gray's wife treated wounded soldiers in the Yellow House and later a group of Virginia soldiers signed a note of appreciation for her efforts.

In 1800, Thomas Charlton set up a hand loom in the Yellow House to make linen.

John King established the Thornton Post Office in the Yellow House in 1829. One of the first in its county not located on a post road, the Thornton Post Office is thought to be the oldest U.S. post office still in its original building.

In 1845, the Yellow House was purchased by William D. Pennell at a bankruptcy auction.

== Isaac Pyle House ==
The Isaac Pyle House, a stone example of the Penn Plan, was built circa 1777.

== Caleb Hoopes House ==
The Caleb Hoopes House is a two-story, four-bay building that was built circa 1790.

== Blacksmith House ==
Built by Joseph Moore around 1805, this two-story, four-bay building reflects a style often referred to as "Pennsylvania Farmhouse".

== Beebe House ==
George Beebe replaced his log cabin with this house, built circa 1851 to a similar plan as the Blacksmith House.

== William D. Pennell House ==
This Gothic Revival-style house was built circa 1850.
