= Cheyney, Pennsylvania =

Unincorporated community in Pennsylvania, US

Cheyney, Pennsylvania Cheyney University, Pennsylvania
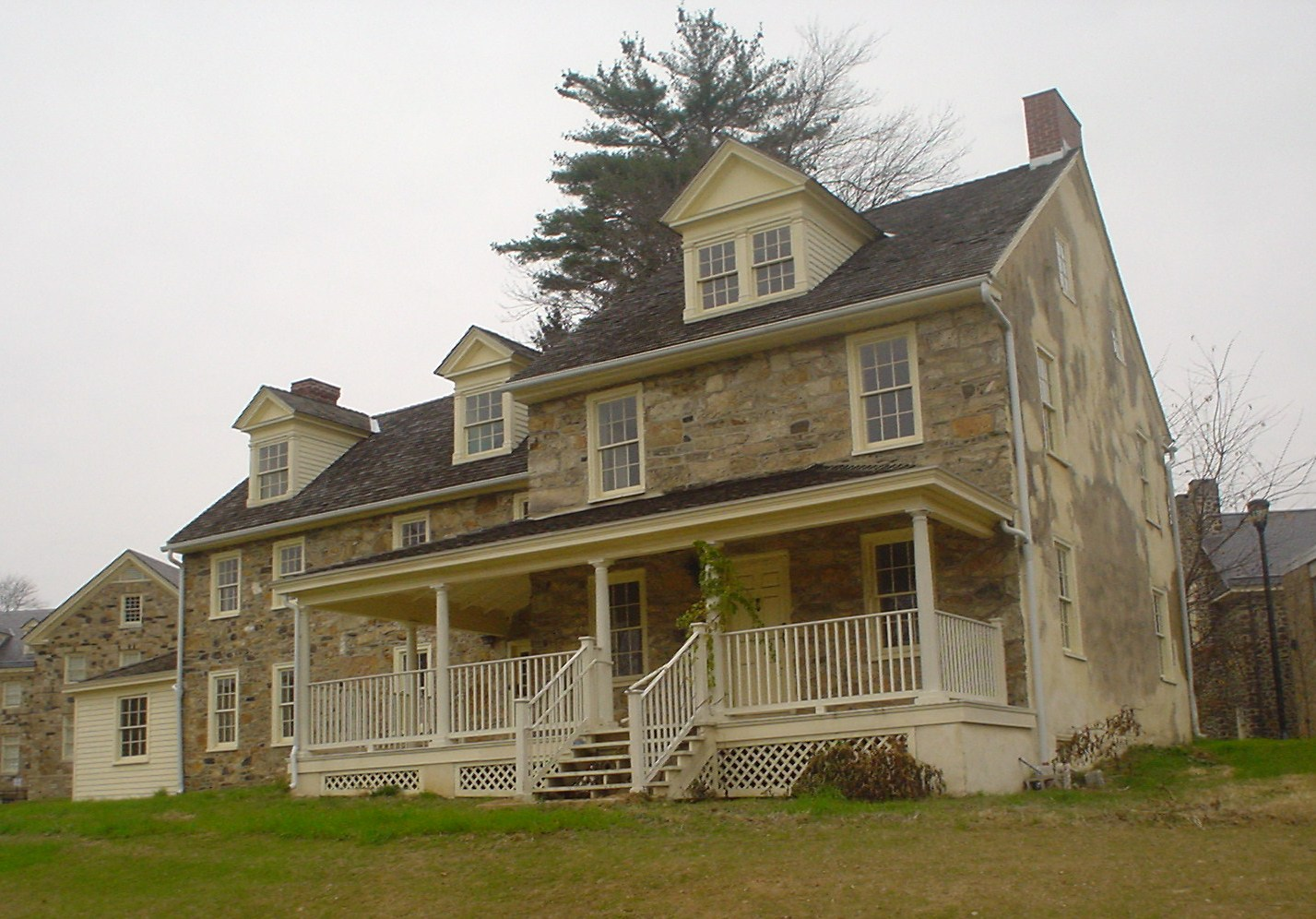
- Melrose at Cheyney University

- Location in Chester County and the U.S. state of Pennsylvania.
- Coordinates: 39°55′42″N 75°31′22″W
- Country: United States
- State: Pennsylvania
- County: Chester
- Townships: Thornbury (Chester)
- Elevation: 259 ft (79 m)

Population (2020)
  - Total: 565
- Time zone: UTC-5 (EST)
  - Summer (DST): UTC-4 (EDT)
- ZIP code: 19319
- Area codes: 610 and 484

Cheyney is an unincorporated community that sits astride Chester and Delaware counties in the U.S. state of Pennsylvania. It corresponds to the census-designated place known as Cheyney University, which had a population of 988 at the 2010 census, and 565 at the 2020 census. It is the home of Cheyney University of Pennsylvania. The university derives its name from George Cheyney's Farm, which became the current campus of Cheyney University in 1902. George Cheyney's Farm and the surrounding area was part of the original land grant given to William Penn in 1681.

Originally, Cheyney was located at the intersection of what is now Creek and Cheyney Roads. The original "Cheyney's Shops" dated from the mid 18th century and were located on the north west and north east corners of the intersection of Creek and Cheyney Roads. The original Cheyney Post Office was located there as well as the general store, hotel, blacksmith shop and wheelsmith's shop. There are old maps that show "Cheyney" to be located at the intersection of Creek (sometimes Tanguy) and Cheyney Roads. All the newer maps show the location of "Cheyney" to be on Station Road.

The Cheyney Family originally owned nearly 10,000 acres.

William Cheyney was the first postmaster in 1835. When the railroad came through Cheyney, the post office was moved to Station Road. The original station was located in a brick structure (now a private residence) that still stands on Station Road just east of Cheyney Road. The current station building is home to the Cheyney Post Office. The last remaining portion of the Cheyney's Shops are on the north east corner of Creek and Cheyney Roads. Cheyney University tore down all the original buildings located on the north west corner in the late 1960s or early 1970s. This group of buildings consisted of a hotel, general store/post office and blacksmith's shop as well as a large bank barn. A stone wheelwright's shop and two other related original buildings are located on the opposite corner and still survive today. These structures were purchased in 1847 from the Cheyney Family by William Maison. The wheelwright shop operated until 1918 when Samuel W. Maison, son of William Maison, died. In 1934 Mary Elizabeth Maison, daughter of William Maison, sold the structures and property.

Cheyney straddles the border between Thornbury Township in Chester County and Thornbury Township in Delaware County. These townships were originally one township, which was bisected when Delaware County split from Chester County in 1789. Both township offices are located along Cheyney Road next to the university.

The John Cheyney Log Tenant House and Farm and Melrose are listed on the National Register of Historic Places.
