= Thornbury Township, Chester County, Pennsylvania =

Township in Pennsylvania, US

Thornbury
- Township
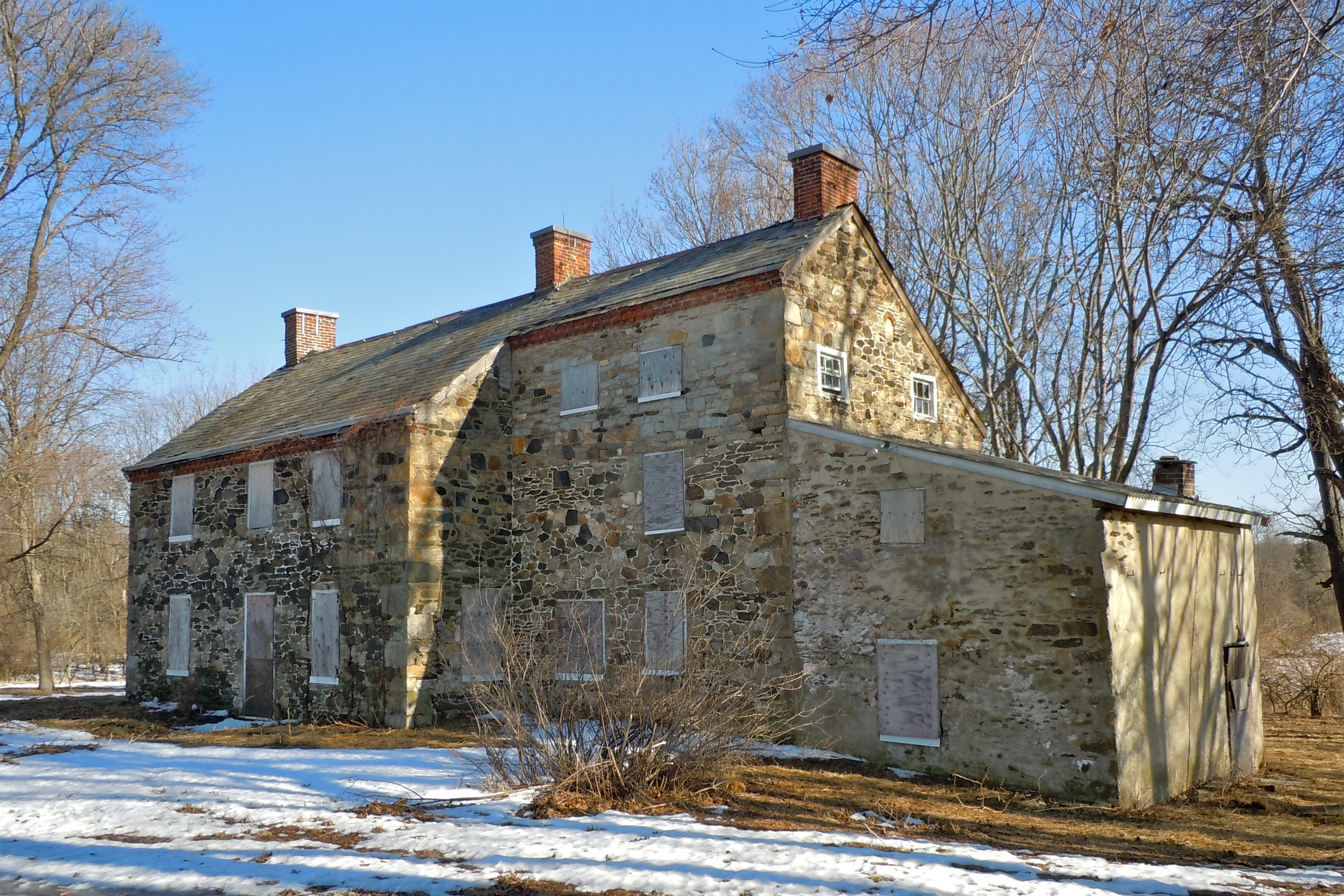
- Squire Cheyney Farm, a historic site in the township

- Location of Thornbury Township in Chester County and of Chester County in Pennsylvania

- Location of Pennsylvania in the United States

- Location of Thornbury Township in Pennsylvania
- Coordinates: 39°55′50″N 75°32′43″W
- Country: United States
- State: Pennsylvania
- County: Chester

Area
  - Total: 3.86 sq mi (10.01 km^{2})
  - Land: 3.83 sq mi (9.93 km^{2})
  - Water: 0.031 sq mi (0.08 km^{2})
- Elevation: 249 ft (76 m)

Population (2010)
  - Total: 3,017
  - Estimate (2016): 3,146
  - Density: 820.7/sq mi (316.89/km^{2})
- Time zone: UTC-5 (EST)
  - Summer (DST): UTC-4 (EDT)
- Area code: 610
- FIPS code: 42-029-76568
- Website: www.thornburytwp.com

Thornbury Township is a township in Chester County, Pennsylvania, United States. The population was 3,017 at the 2010 census. It is adjacent to, and was once joined with, Thornbury Township, Delaware County.

== History ==
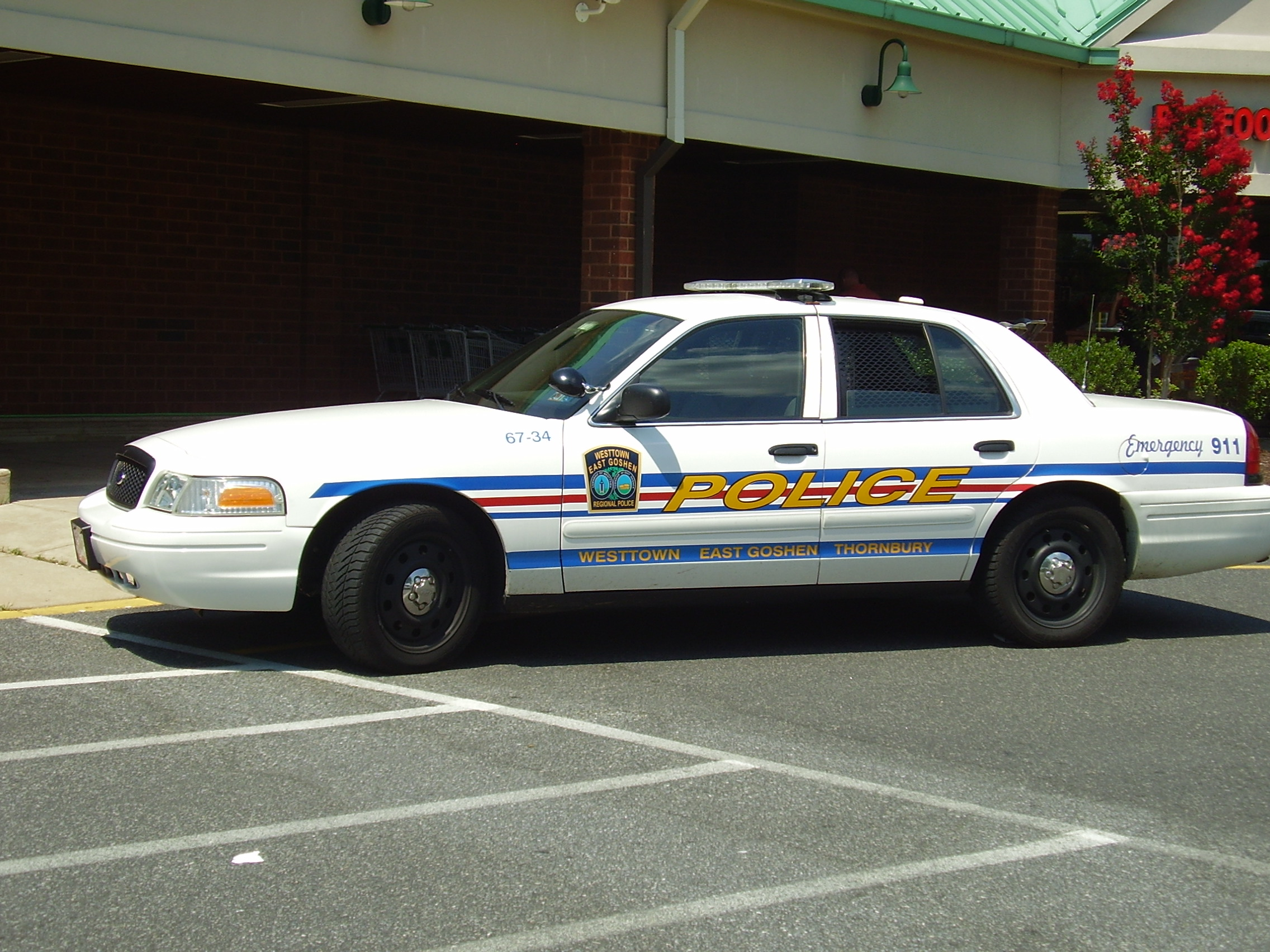
A Westtown-East Goshen Regional Police Department car, serving Thornbury, East Goshen, and Westtown townships

Thornbury Township was organized in 1687 with the appointment of Hugh Durborrow as constable and received its name from Thornbury, in Gloucestershire, England. At the time, no more than five or six families lived within the limits of the township. George Peirce, one of the earliest and most influential inhabitants of the township, was married to a native of Thornbury, England, and the township was purportedly named to compliment her. Thornbury, Birmingham and Westtown townships are the only townships within the present limits of Chester County which were organized before 1704.

The township was divided when Delaware County was separated from Chester County in 1798. As a result, there is a Thornbury Township in each county. Landowners were allowed to choose which county they wished to be in, causing the line between the two townships, and the two counties, to be very irregular.

The Battle of Brandywine, part of the American Revolutionary War took place partially in the town. It was one of Thornbury's citizens, Squire Thomas Cheyney, who informed George Washington, commander of the Continental Army, of the approach of the British troops.

The Squire Cheyney Farm and William J. Barnard Residence are listed on the National Register of Historic Places.

== Points of interest ==
Entries in the National Register of Historic Places

- Melrose Cottage (President's House) on the grounds of Cheyney University of Pennsylvania
- Thornbury Lodge (also known as the William J. Barnard Residence)
- Taylor Frazer Ruins

== Geography ==
According to the United States Census Bureau, the township has a total area of 3.9 square miles (10 km^{2}), all land. It contains part of the unincorporated community and census-designated place of Cheyney.

== Demographics ==
Historical population
Census	Pop.	Note	%±
1930	244		—
1940	233		−4.5%
1950	297		27.5%
1960	746		151.2%
1970	803		7.6%
1980	1,323		64.8%
1990	1,131		−14.5%
2000	2,678		136.8%
2010	3,017		12.7%
2020	3,177		5.3%

At the 2010 census, the township was 85.5% non-Hispanic White, 3.4% Black or African American, 0.1% Native American, 7.6% Asian, and 1.4% were two or more races. 1.9% of the population were of Hispanic or Latino ancestry.

As of the census of 2000, there were 2,678 people, 1,023 households, and 734 families residing in the township. The population density was 684.8 inhabitants per square mile (264.4/km^{2}). There were 1,095 housing units at an average density of 280.0 per square mile (108.1/km^{2}). The racial makeup of the township was 91.90% White, 2.58% African American, 4.56% Asian, 0.04% Pacific Islander, 0.22% from other races, and 0.71% from two or more races. Hispanic or Latino of any race were 0.78% of the population.

There were 1,023 households, out of which 33.6% had children under the age of 18 living with them, 65.6% were married couples living together, 4.2% had a female householder with no husband present, and 28.2% were non-families. 22.6% of all households were made up of individuals, and 3.0% had someone living alone who was 65 years of age or older. The average household size was 2.60 and the average family size was 3.10.

In the township the population was spread out, with 26.0% under the age of 18, 5.4% from 18 to 24, 34.8% from 25 to 44, 26.7% from 45 to 64, and 7.2% who were 65 years of age or older. The median age was 37 years. For every 100 females there were 95.6 males. For every 100 females age 18 and over, there were 95.6 males.

The median income for a household in the township was $84,225, and the median income for a family was $112,291. Males had a median income of $70,602 versus $42,371 for females. The per capita income for the township was $47,505. None of the families and 1.6% of the population were living below the poverty line, including no people under eighteen, and 2.0% of those over 64.

== Education ==
The West Chester Area School District operates public schools serving the township. Elementary schools serving sections include Penn Wood, Sarah Starkweather, and Westtown-Thornbury. All residents are zoned to Stetson Middle School and West Chester Rustin High School.

== Transportation ==
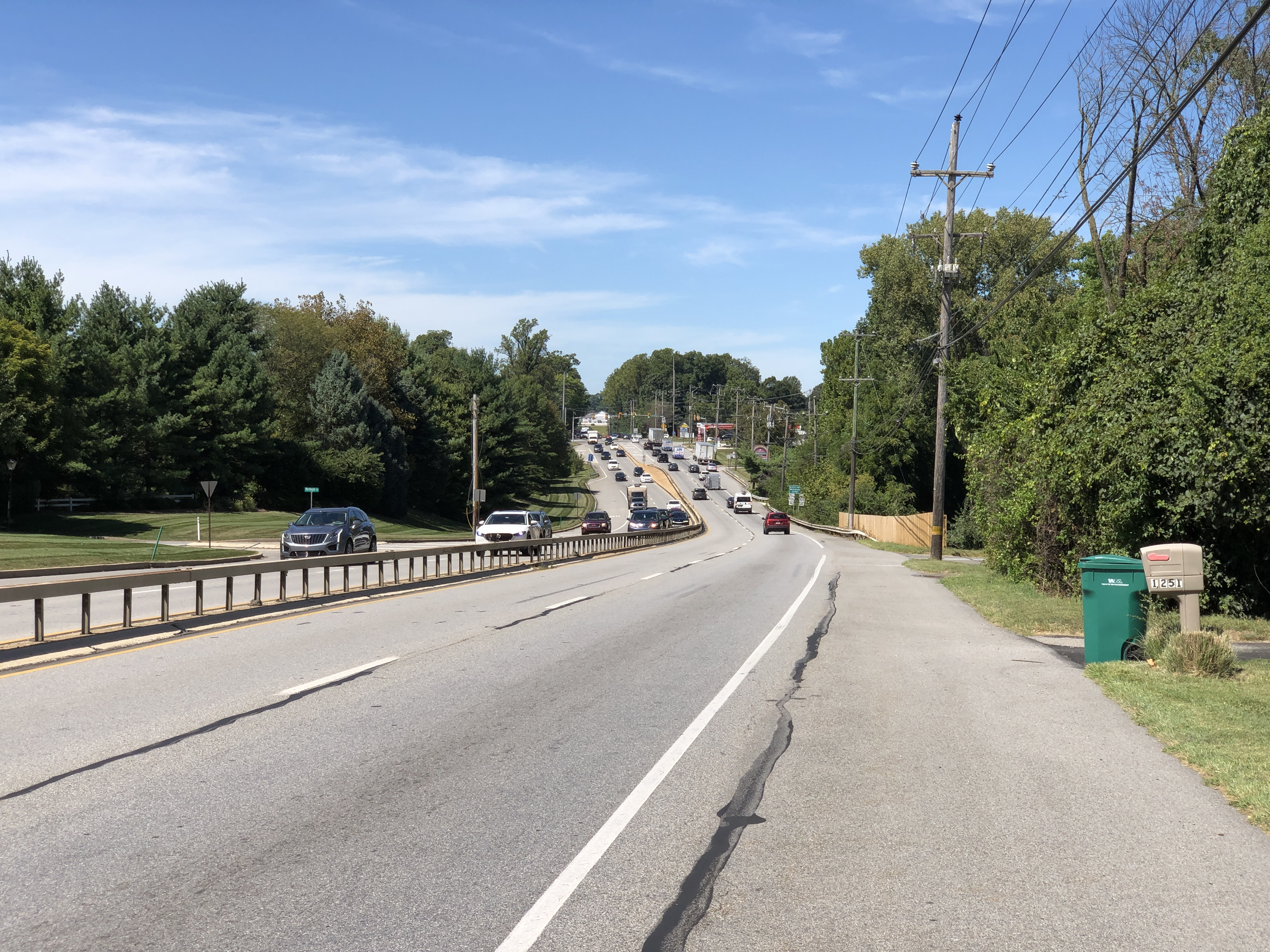
US 202 northbound/US 322 westbound in Thornbury Township

As of 2020, there were 24.18 miles (38.91 km) of public roads in Thornbury Township, of which 6.11 miles (9.83 km) were maintained by the Pennsylvania Department of Transportation (PennDOT) and 18.07 miles (29.08 km) were maintained by the township.

U.S. Route 202, U.S. Route 322 and Pennsylvania Route 926 are the numbered highways serving Thornbury Township. US 202/US 322 concurrently follow the Wilmington-West Chester Pike along a northwest-southeast alignment through the southwestern portion of the township. PA 926 follows Street Road along a southwest-northeast alignment along the northwest edge of the township.

== Notable people ==
- Daniel Garrison Brinton, historian and ethnologist
- Joseph Hemphill, former U.S. Congressman
- Francis James, former U.S. Congressman
