= Squire Cheyney Farm =

- U.S. National Register of Historic Places
- U.S. Historic district
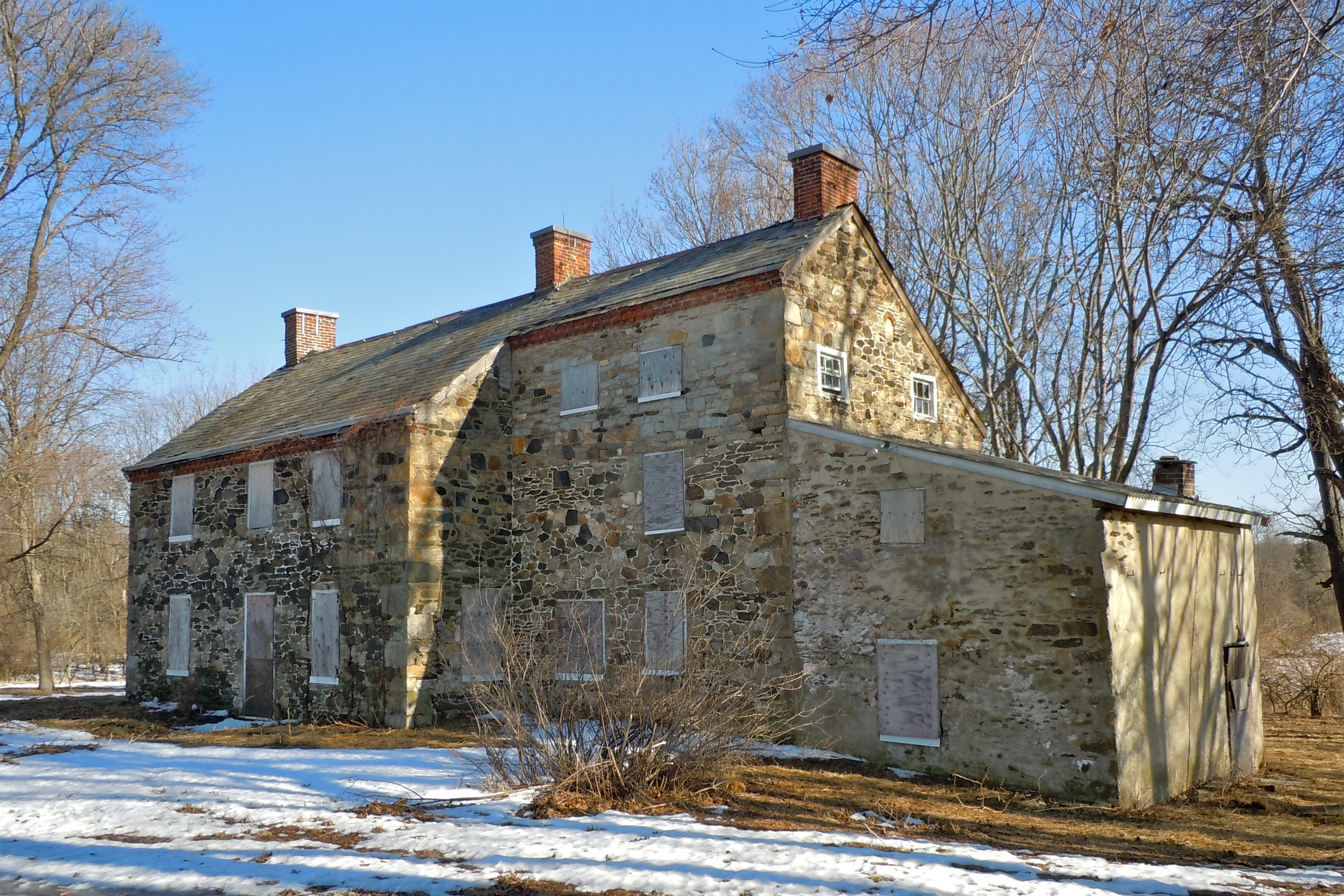
- Squire Cheyney Farmhouse, February 2011

- Location within Pennsylvania Location within the United States
- Location: 1255 Cheyney Thornton Rd., Thornbury Township, Pennsylvania
- Coordinates: 39°56′11″N 75°31′35″W
- Area: 44 acres (18 ha)
- Built: 1797, c. 1804, c. 1815, c. 1830, c. 1850
- Architectural style: 3 cell plan, PA barn
- NRHP reference No.: 09001214
- Added to NRHP: January 11, 2010

The Squire Cheyney Farm is an historic farm and national historic district that is located in Thornbury Township, Chester County, Pennsylvania, United States.

It was listed on the National Register of Historic Places in 2010.

== History and architectural features ==
This district encompasses two contributing buildings, three contributing sites, one contributing structure, and contributing object. They are the farmhouse, a barn (c. 1804, c. 1820, c. 1875, 1881, and c. 1910), the ruins of a granary, the remains of an ice house, a spring house (1799), a stone retaining wall, and a family cemetery (established c. 1803).

The house was built in four periods, with the oldest dating to circa 1797. The oldest section is a 2 1/2-story, three-bay, stuccoed stone structure with a gable roof. The additions were built c. 1815, 1830 and 1850, making it a seven-bay-wide dwelling. It is L-shaped and has a slate gable roof.

During the American Revolution, Thomas "Squire" Cheyney [II] informed General George Washington during the Battle of Brandywine that the British were flanking him to the north. Cheyney was later appointed to the Pennsylvania Ratifying Convention to ratify the United States Constitution.

The original two level rubble-stone bank barn was built by Squire Cheyney and his son William about 1804 in the English Lake District Barn style (Dornbusch Type E Barn). The stone on this portion of the barn is identical to that on the oldest portion of the existing farmhouse. The barn was enlarged by his son in 1820 to a Chester County Stone-Posted-Forebay Barn (Dornbusch Type J). A granary was subsequently added about 1850. About the same time a dormer was added to the forebay. The farm remained in the Cheney family until 1875 as a commercial dairy farm. In 1875 it was sold to the Thomas Dallett and continued as a commercial dairy farm. About this time the barn was extended to the west. Between 1875 and 1910 a frame outshed was added to the northwest portion of the barn. A stone silo was added in 1910. The granary was destroyed by fire about 1930. Of the granary and silo only the foundations remain. The farm remained in the Dallett family until its conversion to a public park and restoration of the farmhouse and barns for private use. The well house was built in the 1960s. The garage and east wing of the farmhouse were added as part of the 2014 renovation.

Squire Cheyney was born on the Cheyney farm in 1730, but not in the existing farmhouse. He was one of four brothers. The land that became Cheyney University of Pennsylvania was from the original 500 acre Cheyney farm, but was not part of Thomas Cheyney's 150 acres.

The Squire Thomas Cheyney Farm is not a national historic district; however, it is listed on the National Register of Historic Places. The English Lake District Barn fieldstone core building with rare interior granary and shutters was built c. 1799–1803 by Squire Thomas Cheyney and his son William Farmer Cheyney. The house is composed of a core house and two additions. The 2 1/2-story three-bay fieldstone core house, with late 19th-century pebble dash stucco on the east gable end wall only, was built by Squire Cheyney c. 1756–1757 not 1797. The 2 1/2-story, two-bay fieldstone addition was built by Squire Cheyney c. 1758–1760 not 1815. The fieldstone springhouse was built c. 1756–57 not 1799. Later an interior springhouse was constructed in the basement of the 1760 addition.

=== Present day ===
This site was listed on the National Register of Historic Places in 2010, was privately owned as of 2018. Featured on the 2019 Chester County Day, it is adjacent to the Squire Cheyney Farm Park and the springhouse is located on public property.

The Cheyney family cemetery where Thomas Cheyney was buried lies within the park. A walking trail through the park offers views of the Southern exposure of the house and barn (including the forebay), as well as historical information on Thomas Cheyney and his role in the Revolutionary War.
